= H. K. Narayana =

Musical artist (1934-2008)

H.K.Narayana
- Also known as: HKN
- Born: H. K. Narayana; 14 May 1934
- Origin: Holenarasipura, Hassan, Karnataka, India
- Died: 8 February 2008 (aged 73)
- Occupations: Music composer; music director; singer

H. K. Narayana was a singer and music composer from Karnataka, India. He played an important role in popularizing the genre of Sugama Sangeetha in Kannada. Nadavirada Baduke by Nissar Ahmed, Brundavanake Haalanu Maaralu by Kuvempu and Shubha Nudiye Shakunada Hakki by D. R. Bendre are some of his well-known numbers. He is popular through Navasuma and Geetaraadhana in Radio.

== Early life ==
Narayana was born in 1934 at Holenarasipura in Hassan district of Karnataka to Keshavayya and Sannamma. Influenced by his father, who was a musician himself, Narayana developed interest in music early in his life and started learning Violin at a young age of six. He later got his Carnatic classical vocal music lessons from the veteran musician R. K. Srikantan in Mysore. H.K. Narayana was known to be one of the favourite students of R. K. Srikantan. He later switched to Sugama Sangeetha, an area he was much passionate about.

== Family ==
Narayana's wife Kanta is a Kathak dancer. They have two daughters.

== Career ==
He got associated with the All India Radio early in his student life and gave many performances. He also later joined as a staff artist in AIR. H. K. Narayana known as HKN worked with All India Radio for almost four decades. He held many important roles and responsibilities in AIR as Junior composer, Senior composer, Music producer, 'A' Grade artiste of Sugama Sangeetha and Classical Music. M.D. Parthasarathy who worked as the Assistant Producer of Light Music at AIR, Bangalore is supposed to have played a key role in imparting the art of composing the melody and the background score to HKN. He retired from AIR in the year 1989.

HKN was part of the committee constituted in 2004 by N. Dharam Singh the then Chief minister of Karnataka Government to select and suggest a befitting tune for the rendition of the Karnataka state anthem in 2004. The committee composed of G. S. Shivarudrappa, Siddalingiah, Doddarange Gowda and Rajashekhar Mansur deliberated over the quality and dignity of rendition of the officially edited version of the poem and recommended that the music composed by Mysore Ananthaswamy was apt.

He has composed music for several music based plays including Shringaranayaka of Jayadeva, Chitrangada of Kuvempu, Gita Bharata of Rabindranath Tagore. He has composed music for more than 25 dance dramas abroad. He has also given several performances as a singer for Light Music, Classical Music and Bharatanatya in several part of India and in US, England, Singapore, Hongkong, Ceylon, Russia, Manila and other places. Though his major contributions as a musician are found in compositions of Kannada, one can definitely get a taste of HKN's musical compositions in other regional languages as well. He has composed music to three Malayalam songs in a programme organised by Akashavani in Calicut.

He has also worked with several other artistes to create several popular work of art in the field of music. He has sung for as many as 150 audio cassettes with noted classical musician Rajkumar Bharathi for Ramanamaharshi Gitagayana. He has composed music for more 35 audio cassettes sung by noted vocalist Vidyabhushana.

== Excellence ==
HKN was known for carefully crafting the tune of the song without compromising on the lyrical beauty of it. Listeners could enjoy the emotional core of the poem in his scores. His excellence in music composition reflects in the song Shubha nudiye shakunada hakki which creates a perfect ambience while still reinforcing the meaning. When the phrase Googeyondu Gukkenuthiththa is rendered he cleverly deviates from the scale introducing an odd note, which blends aptly with the meaning and the mood of the song. To compel the listener to concentrate on the lyric HKN often introduced a slight delay of the voice delivery with respect to the beat pattern in his compositions making room for emphasis on the meaning. He was supposedly influenced by the legendary singer Ghantasala. The voice modulation and 'Gamaka (music)' ('drag' and 'looping' of 'graces') reflects Ghantasala's influence on HKN. Composers recall HKN's seriousness and immense commitment towards his work. It is said that HKN'S handwritten scripts were a treat to see with his notations, neatly handwritten and highlighted in different coloured inks. This habit of making meticulous scripts came from the days of him being a Copyist with AIR, during the days when the Kannada typewriter was not in much use.

== Song compositions ==
Some of the popular compositions of HKN.

| Album | Lyrics | Genre | Singers |
|---|---|---|---|
| Baro Vasantha | Dr. N. S. Lakshminarayan Bhat | Light Music | Mysore Ananthaswamy, Shimoga Subbanna, Rathnamala Prakash, Sulochana & others |
| Aralu Mallige | Multiple Lyricists | Light Music | Indu Vishwanath, H.K. Narayana |
| Sanje Mallige | Multiple Lyricists | Light Music | Indu Vishwanath, H.K.Narayana |
| Bhakti Sowrabha | Dasara Padagalu | Devotional | Vidyabhushana |
| Krishnana Kandeera | Dasara Padagalu | Devotional | Vidyabhushana |
| Kodubega Divyamathi | Naraharitirtha, Purandara Dasa, Sripadaraja | Devotional | M. S. Sheela |
| Madhuri | Dr. N.S. Lakshminarayan Bhat | Light Music | Shimoga Subbanna, Rathnamala Prakash, Sulochana & others |

== Death ==
H. K. Narayana died on 8 February 2008 in Bangalore after a prolonged illness. He was 73. He is survived by wife Kanta Narayan and two daughters Manju and Chandrika.

== Awards ==
H. K. Narayana has got many awards to his credit.

- Karnataka Kalatilaka Award by Karnataka Sangeeta Nritya Academy
- Rajyotsava Award
- Chowdaiaha Award
- Santha Shishunala Sharifa Award
- Pampa Award
- Aryabhata Award
