= Balappa Hukkeri =

Indian singer

Balappa Hukkeri ಬಾಳಪ್ಪ ಹುಕ್ಕೇರಿ

Background information
- Born: 1911
- Origin: Murgod, Belagavi district, Karnataka
- Died: 1992 (aged 80–81)
- Genres: Bhavageete, Sugama Sangeetha, Folk
- Occupations: Singer, songwriter

Balappa Hukkeri (Kannada: ಬಾಳಪ್ಪ ಹುಕ್ಕೇರಿ) (1911–1992) was a singer of folk songs and Bhavageetes in Kannada language and a freedom fighter in his early years. He is mainly credited for popularizing Sugama Sangeetha in North Karnataka, just like P. Kalinga Rao who popularized the art form in South Karnataka. Several prestigious awards have been conferred to him including Sangeet Natak Academy award and "Karnataka Sangeeta Nataka Academy Award". Balappa was fondly called as ‛Saavira Haadugala Saradara’ (Eng: 'The champion/custodian of thousand songs').

== Early life ==
Balappa was born in Murgod, a small village in savadatti of Belagavi district. He was named after his musician uncle. Balappa was drawn to theater at an early age due to family influence and started participating in local drama companies as an actor-singer. Even though he started training in Hindustani music by Shivalingiah Gavai, his interests were inclined towards lighter form of the music such as theater songs, Marathi abhangs, vachanas and folk songs.

== Singing career ==
In his thirties, Balappa participated in Indian freedom movement. He was going from village to village singing patriotic songs for which he was arrested and jailed for six months. He gave away family's gold and silver to the National security fund during India's war with China. He also worked as a field worker in the Department of Agriculture, travelling from village to village, singing songs on farming methods and family planning. During this time Balappa was drawn towards the writing of Navodaya writers in Kannada such as D.R. Bendre, Betageri Krishnasharma and Anandakanda and started singing Bhavageetes based on their poems.

Balappa's singing style was unique mainly because of the way he wove both the elements of classical and folk traditions into it. He used to travel to remote villages in Karnataka and Maharashtra to collect folk songs. He never wrote down folk songs and knew hundreds of them by rote. During his singing career Balappa never used anything but a Tabla and Harmonium for accompaniment.

== Awards and honours ==
- Sangeet Natak Academy award – 1980
