= N.S. Prasad =

Indian mandolinist (1960-2026)

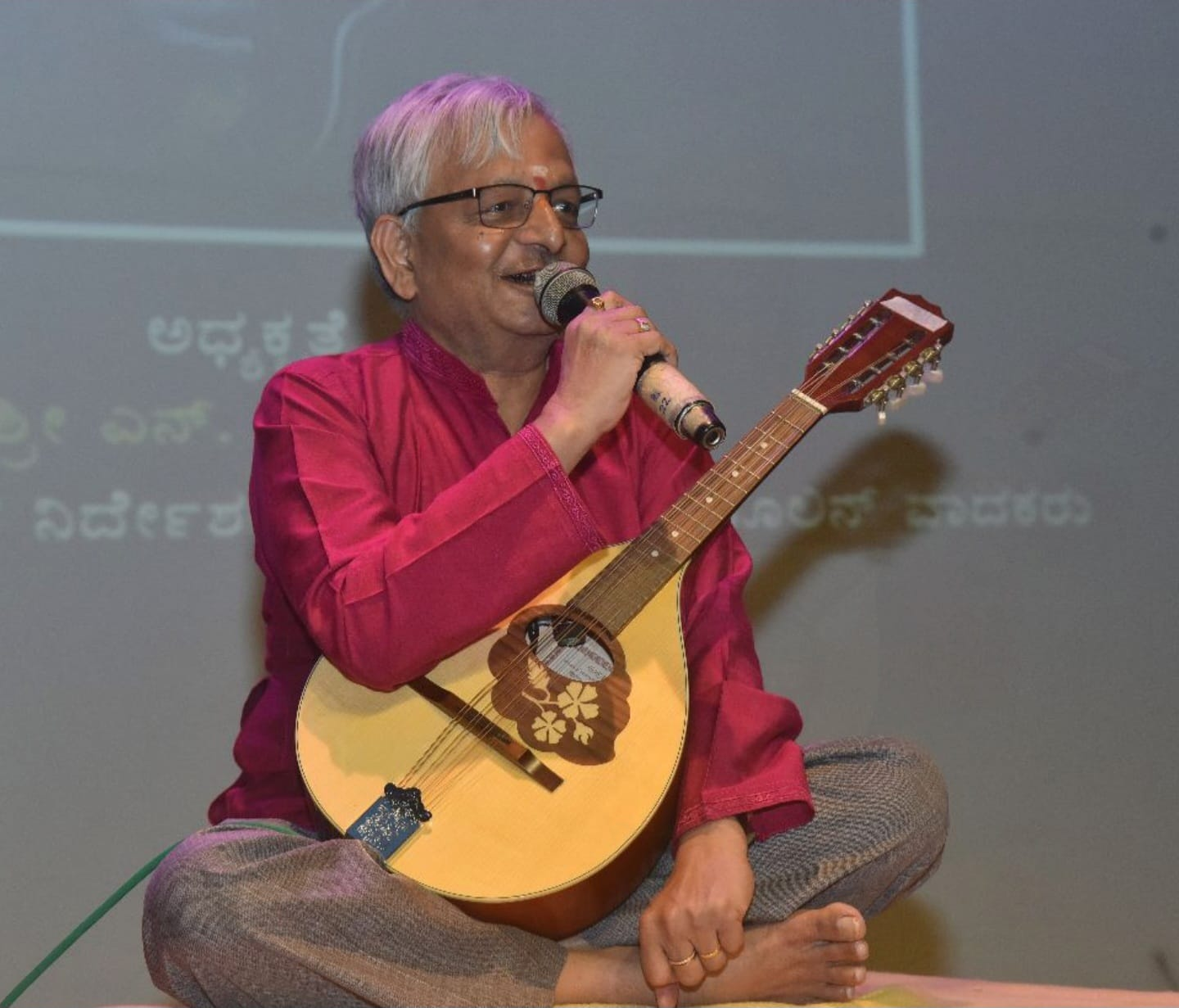
- N.S. Prasad

Background information
- Born: N.S. Prasad; March 15, 1960; Mysore, Karnataka, India
- Died: July 25, 2026 (aged 66)
- Genres: Carnatic music, Fusion music, Film score
- Occupations: Musician, Composer
- Instrument: Mandolin
- Years active: 1970s–2026
- Website: mandolinprasad.in

N.S. Prasad (15 March 1960 - 25 June 2026), professionally known as Mandolin Prasad, was an Indian mandolin player and composer primarily active in the Kannada film industry and Sugama Sangeetha. He was a recipient of the Karnataka Kalashri (2009), the state of Karnataka's highest honor for music and dance, awarded by the Karnataka Sangeetha Nrithya Academy.

== Early life ==
Prasad was born in Mysore, India. He received a Bachelor of Science degree from Mysore University. His musical training began on the veena under Vidwan V. Desikachar before he transitioned to the mandolin, training under H.S. Satyanarayana.

== Career ==
Prasad was a graded artist for All India Radio (AIR).

=== Film and Composition ===
Prasad composed the musical score for the 2005 Kannada film Mithayi Mane, directed by Aarathi. The film won the Karnataka State Film Award for Best Children Film.

=== Sugama Sangeetha and Style ===
Prasad is recognized for adapting the mandolin, traditionally a Western or Carnatic instrument, to the nuances of Sugama Sangeetha (Kannada light classical music). He has been a frequent collaborator with the "Mysore school" of composers, focusing on the melodic interpretation of Bhaavageethe (expressionist poetry). His technique often incorporates gamakas (ornamentations) characteristic of Indian classical music, allowing the mandolin to emulate the vocal delivery required for Kannada literary works.

He served as a music arranger for the composer C. Ashwath for three decades, contributing to the scores of films such as Chinnari Mutha, Kotreshi Kanasu, Mysore Mallige, and Nagamandala.

=== Performance ===
As an accompanist, he has performed with Sugama Sangeetha artists including Mysore Ananthaswamy, Shimoga Subbanna, and Ratnamala Prakash. He frequently collaborates with his brother, flautist N.S. Muralidhar.

== Discography ==
Albums

Prasad has released several albums featuring both solo mandolin and fusion compositions:

- Sur Madhur (Solo)
- Kalasangama (Fusion)
- Ayyanaiyyane (with Unni Menon)
- Ellelli Nodali (Instrumental)

Films

- Mithayi Mane (2005)
- Nanna Kanasina Hoove (2006)

== Awards ==
- 2008: "Best String Player" awarded by the Bangalore Music Academy.
- 2009: Karnataka Kalashri, awarded by the Karnataka Sangeetha Nrithya Academy (Government of Karnataka).
- 2020: Mirchi Music Awards (Special Jury Award - South).
