= Rathnamala Prakash =

Indian singer (born 1955)

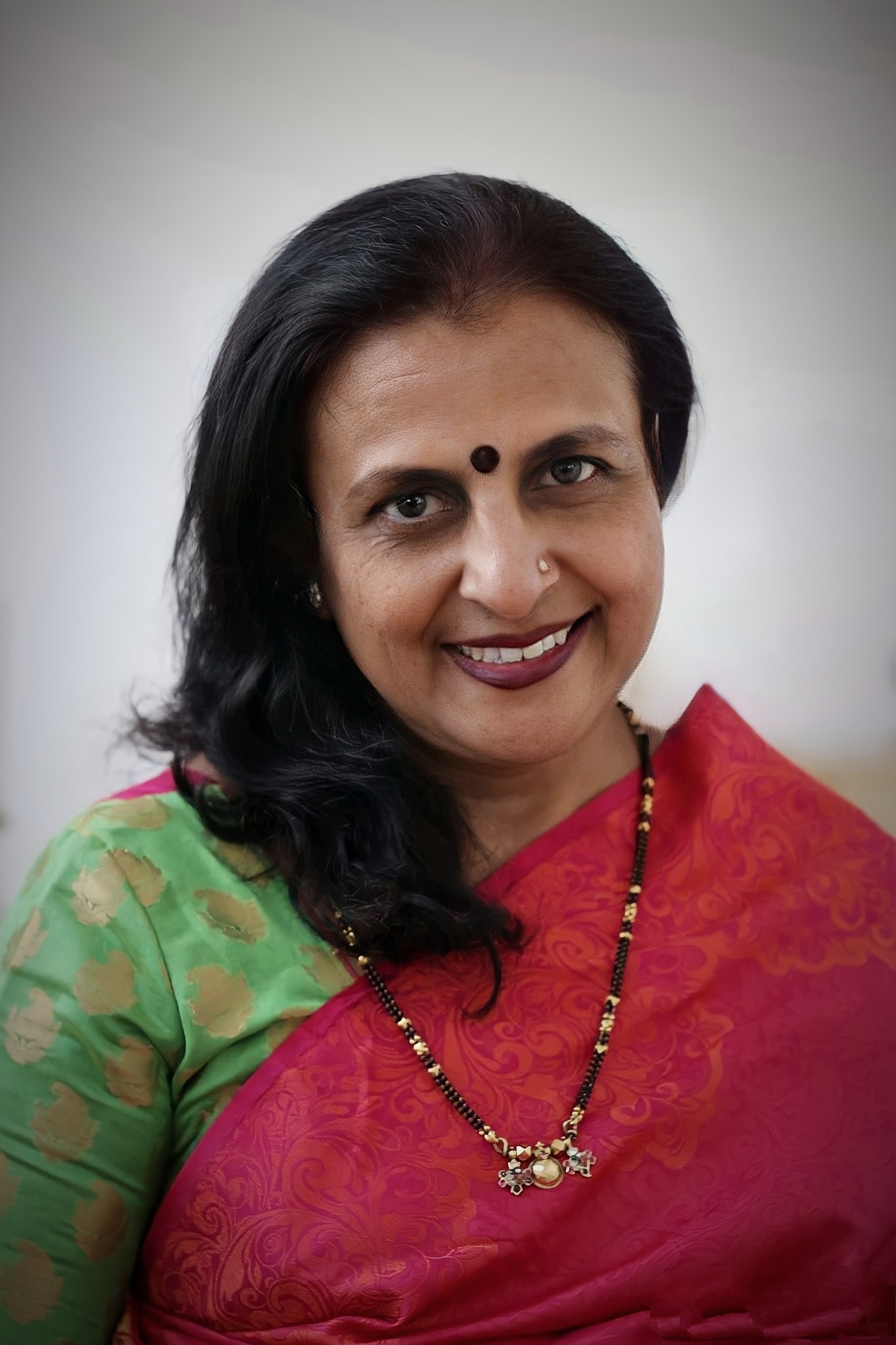

Background information
- Also known as: Haadu hakki, voice of Karnataka, Rathnakka
- Born: 19 August 1952 (age 74); Karnataka State, India
- Genres: Sugama sangeetha, filmi
- Occupation: Playback singer

Ratnamala Prakash (born 19 August 1952) is an Indian singer who sings in Kannada language. Along with playback signing, she is known for her songs in Sugama Sangeetha, a light musical genre in Kannada. Her father R. K. Srikantan was a Carnatic classical musician. In 2016, Rathnamala was awarded the Sangeet Natak Academy Award for her contribution to the field of Sugama Sangeetha.

== Career ==
Apart from numerous Bhaavageethas she has sung many film songs. Ratnamala's first film song is Tangaaliyante baalalli bande a duet with Dr.Rajkumar from the super hit movie Guri. Then she sang many songs for L. Vaidyanathan, C. Ashwath, M. Ranga Rao, Vijaya bhaskar, Rajan–Nagendra, Hamsalekha and others. Ratnmala prakash has sung many songs, including Santhasa araluva samaya a duet with SPB from the movie Elu suttina kote, Meru giriyane neeli kadalaane a duet with K. J. Yesudas from the movie SP Sangliyana Part 2, "Raayaru bandaru maavana manege" and "yava mohana murali kareyitho" from the movie Mysoru mallige, "Gediyabeku magala", "Hudugi hoo hudugi" from the movie Naga mandala.

== Discography ==
Film songs recorded by Rathnamala Prakash.

Song	Film	Year	Music	Lyrics	Co-singer	Actress
Jwalamukhiya Hage	Mohini 9886788888	2006	Hamsalekha	Hamsalekha	Shankar Mahadevan	Sadha
Shrungarada Kavyavo	Yare Nee Abhimani	2000	Hamsalekha	Hamsalekha	S. P. B.	Ramya Krishnan
Baare Baare Rukkamma	Gadibidi Krishna	1998	Hamsalekha	Hamsalekha	Rajesh Krishnan	Indraja
Hudugi Hoo Hudugi, Gediyabeku Magala	Nagamandala	1997	C. Ashwath	Gopal Yagnik	Solo (1st two)	Vijayalakshmi, B. Jayashree
Teru hoitaithavva	Kotreshi Kanasu	1995	C. Ashwath	H. S. Venkateshamurthy	Manjula Gururaj, Master Sharma	
O Gulabiye	Om	1995	Hamsalekha	Hamsalekha	Dr. Rajkumar	Prema
Rayaru bandaru	Mysore Mallige	1992	C. Ashwath	K. S. Narasimhaswamy	Solo	Sudha Rani
Aaha Aaha Yarivalu, Lo Lo Lo Ee Pathi	Bhale Keshava	1992	Manoranjan Prabhakar	M. N. Vysa Rao	S. P. B, Solo (2nd One)	Shivaranjini, Anjali
Nannake Nakkaga	Bombay Dada	1991	Shankar–Ganesh	Sriranga	S. P. B.	Shanthamma, Madhuri
Beku Beku	Nanagu Hendthi Beku	1991	Manoranjan Prabhakar	Hamsalekha	Vinod Raj	
Thanuvalla Thanu Odayanu, Nammadesha Bharatha, Bettadha Melondu, Shiva Mantravenage, Saavillada Kedillada, Chilipili Endhoduva, Maraviddu Phalavenu	Shivayogi Akkamahadevi	1991	Mysore Ananthaswamy	(1st two); Basavaraja Maharushi, Vachana	Solo	Usha
Devaritta Varave Hennu	Chapala Chennigaraya	1990	Rajan–Nagendra		S. P. B.	Kalpana
Meru Giriyane	S. P. Sangliyana Part 2	1990	Hamsalekha	Hamsalekha	K. J. Yesudas	Bhavya
Santasa Araluva Samaya	Elu Suttina Kote	1987	L. Vaidyanath		S. P. B.	Gautami
Ullavara Manege	Kendada Male	1987	L. Vaidyanath		Ramprasad	Chandralekha, Shanthamma
Mallige Hoovinantha, Mutthonda Thande	Ondu Muttina Kathe	1987	L. Vaidyanathan	Chi. Udaya Shankar	Dr. Rajkumar	Archana
Mahodyayanithyaya	Sampradaya	1987	P. Vajrappa	K. Prabhakara Shashtry	P. B. Srinivas, Chorus	Bharathi Vishnuvardhan, Hema Choudhary
Thangaliyante Balalli Bande	Guri	1986	Rajan–Nagendra	Chi. Udaya Shankar	Dr. Rajkumar	Archana
Utthada Holava Kande	Shankha Nada	1986	C. Ashwath	Dodda Rangegowda	Solo	Abhinaya

== Awards ==
National Awards:

1. 2016 - Sangeet Natak Academy Award for Other Major Traditions of Music-Sugama Sangeetha.

State Awards:

1. 2016 - Santa Shishunala Sharif Award by The Kannada and Culture Department, Government of Karnataka.
2. 1991 - Karnataka Rajyotsava Award by Karnataka Government.
3. 1990 - Karnataka Kalashree Award by Karnataka Sangeetha Nrithya Academy.

Other awards:

1. 2017 - Alwa's Nudisiri Award
2. 2014 - Vocational Excellence Award by Rotary Club
3. 2012 - Artist of The Year award by Bala Samaja
4. K. S. Narasimhaswamy Pratishtana Award
5. Excellent Achievement in Sugama Sangeetha by D. Subbaramaiah Trust
6. 2010 - Krishna Hanagal Award by Hanagal Foundation
