= P. Kalinga Rao =

Indian singer (1914–1981)

Background information
- Born: Pandeshwara Kalinga Rao; 1914; Aroor, Udupi
- Origin: Udupi district, Karnataka, India
- Died: 21 September 1981 (aged 66–67)
- Genres: Bhavageete, Sugama Sangeetha (film songs)
- Occupations: Singer, composer

Pandeshwara Kalinga Rao (1914 – 21 September 1981) was an Indian Bhavageete and Sugama Sangeetha singer and composer in the Kannada language.

== Biography ==
Kalinga Rao was married to Meenakshamma (d. 2015). They had four children together: Prema, Vasanth, Sharath and Santosh. Rao was a primary school drop-out. But his knowledge of six languages was near scholarly.

== Pioneer of light music ==
He popularised the Kannada Bhavageete, a form of music that derives lyrics from popular poetry and devotional works.

Rao is widely regarded as the pioneer of the Kannada Sugama Sangeeta genre. He was active for three decades from 1950 and thankfully almost all of his tunes were recorded either by the gramophone companies or All India Radio. Kalinga Rao began his musical life in the era of the 78 rpm gramophone record, and the three-minute discs took his music to audiences all over Karnataka. He was also a rage on radio, and started a musical counter culture that could take on expensively produced film songs.

Poets Kuvempu, Bendre, and K S Narasimha Swamy were writing inspired lyrics that would soon turn into classics, and Kalinga Rao was instrumental in composing tunes for them. He also sang Purandaradasa and folk songs, emerging as a complete practitioner of Kannada music. Kalinga Rao used the medium of music more as a promoter of poems of great Kannada poets such as Kuvempu, D. R. Bendre and Gopalakrishna Adiga than as a performer unlike professional musicians. It was not the music, but the words of these poets which sought importance in his compositions.

== Distinctive composition ==
Kalinga Rao had learnt Carnatic and Hindustani classical music, but chose to experiment and arrive at a style that struck a balance between classical music and film music. Aesthetically, the genre he created drew from both worlds: raga nuances from the former, and the freedom to break from raga grammar from the latter. He also brought in Western orchestra colour, just like the movie composers, but was sparing in their use. Kalinga Rao mastered a mellow, understated, and chorus-easy style. He was the Chief Composer at the Gubbi Veeranna Drama Company. He acted and composed the music for Kannada cinema "Vasantha Sena".

== Influence ==
Kalinga Rao's composer-singer tradition was carried forward by Mysore Ananthaswamy, C. Ashwath and Shivamogga Subbanna, and grew into a movement in the 1990s, giving rise to annual conferences and schools teaching sugama sangeeta. Mysore Ananthaswamy leaned towards the filigree of the ghazal style and excelled at tweaking Western styles for Kannada songs. C. Ashwath evolved a style that dramatised a folksy style. His signature composition Udayavagali Namma Cheluva Kannada Nadu which inspired the Kannada unification movement was a landmark in the Kannada light music tradition.

== Commemoration ==
A compilation of his works was released in the form of a CD titled Barayya Beladingale in 2010 with the help of some Government officials and talented artistes like D Srinivas, Rajesh, Suma Rani, Nelson, Venu, Arun Kumar, Varadaraj, Caleb and V Umesh. Kalinga Rao's original recordings used a piano, strings, clarinet, trumpets, and a tight rhythm section which often incorporates folk sounds. The magic of his music isn't completely lost in the digital format, although listeners who have heard him on spool and vinyl records may miss the warmth of his era.

Department of Kannada and Culture organised a programme to mark the birth centenary of P Kalinga at Ravindra Kalakshetra on 6 September 2014. The Chief Minister of the state of Karnataka Siddaramaiah inaugurated the day-long event. A photo exhibition was organised to introduce the legendary singer to the present generation. Beladingala Hakki, a 240-page book on Kalinga Rao, a CD on his recordings of Rangageethegalu (theatre songs), and the radio play for which he composed music was released on the occasion.

A Kannada monograph P Kalinga Rao, edited by B S Keshava Rao and Jayashri Aravind and published by the Kannada and Culture department, brings to light many interesting events from his life, including one where a government official demands certificates of his music qualifications for the grant of an artist pension. Kalinga Rao angrily rejects the pension, but chief minister Devaraj Urs steps in to help him in his needy days.

== Popular songs ==
List of some of his popular songs.

Songs	Lyrics	Singers	Music	Genre
Thoogiro Chinnava	Traditional	P Kalinga Rao, Mohanakumari & Party	P Kalinga Rao	Lullaby
Yaakaluve Ele Ranga	Traditional	P Kalinga Rao, Mohanakumari & Party	P Kalinga Rao	Lullaby
Adu Betta Idu Betta	Traditional	P Kalinga Rao, Mohanakumari & Party	P Kalinga Rao	Indian folk music
Baarayya Beladingale	Traditional	P Kalinga Rao, Mohanakumari & Party	P Kalinga Rao	Indian folk music
Attillada Manege	Traditional	P Kalinga Rao, Mohanakumari & Party	P Kalinga Rao	Indian folk music
Moodal Kunigal Kere	Traditional	P Kalinga Rao, Mohanakumari & Party	P Kalinga Rao	Indian folk music
Betta Bittiliyuttha	Traditional	P Kalinga Rao, Mohanakumari & Party	P Kalinga Rao	Indian folk music
Yaaru Hithavaru Ninage	Purandara Dasa	P Kalinga Rao, Mohanakumari & Party	P Kalinga Rao	Devotional
Maadu Sikkadalla	Purandara Dasa	P Kalinga Rao, Mohanakumari & Party	P Kalinga Rao	Devotional
Nageyu Barutide	Purandara Dasa	P Kalinga Rao, Mohanakumari & Party	P Kalinga Rao	Devotional
Helkolok Ondooru	G. P. Rajarathnam	P Kalinga Rao, Mohanakumari & Party	P Kalinga Rao	Kannada poetry
Holiya Hunnime	RC Bhoosanuramath	P Kalinga Rao	BV Srinivas	Kannada poetry
Brammaninge	G. P. Rajarathnam	P Kalinga Rao, Mohanakumari & Party	P Kalinga Rao	Kannada poetry
Baagilolu Kaimugidu	Kuvempu	P Kalinga Rao, Mohanakumari & Party	P Kalinga Rao	Kannada poetry
Anantadim	Kuvempu	P Kalinga Rao	BV Srinivas	Kannada poetry
Mugila Maarige Ragarathiya	D. R. Bendre	P Kalinga Rao	BV Srinivas	Kannada poetry
Aluva kadaloLu Telibarutalide	Gopalkrishna Adiga	P Kalinga Rao	BV Srinivas	Kannada poetry
Anthintha Hennu Neenalla	K. S. Narasimhaswamy	P Kalinga Rao	G. K. Venkatesh	Kannada poetry
Yerisi Haarisi Kannadada	B. M. Srikantaiah	P Kalinga Rao, Mohanakumari & Party	P Kalinga Rao	Patriotic
Ilidu Baa Taayi	Da Ra Bendre	P Kalinga Rao	BV Srinivas	Patriotic
Udayavaagali Namma	Huilgol Narayana Rao	P Kalinga Rao, Mohanakumari & Party	P Kalinga Rao	Patriotic

== Music Direction for Movies ==
Year	Film	Language	Director	Banner	Notes
1947	Krishnaleela	Kannada	C. V. Raju		
1948	Bhakta Ramadas	Kannada	Kemparaj Urs		
1949	Kalaavida	Kannada	Krishnan Suryanarayan	Sohanlal Viswakalasthan Ltd	
1950	Sasidharan	Malayalam	T. Janaki Ram		
1953	Muyarchi	Tamil	Joseph Pallippad	C. C. Productions	with S. G. K. Pillai
1959	Abba Aa Hudugi	Kannada	H. L. N. Simha	Sri Jamuna Productions	
1966	Mahaashilpi	Kannada	S. V. Doraiswamy		

== Playback for Movies ==
Year	Film	Language	Song	Music director	Co-singer
1950	Chechi	Malayalam	Aasha Thakarukayo	G. K. Venkatesh	Kaviyoor C. K. Revamma
1950	Chechi	Malayalam	Oru Vichaaram	G. K. Venkatesh	Mohana Kumari
1950	Chechi	Malayalam	Chirakaala Manobhaavam	G. K. Venkatesh	Mohana Kumari
1950	Chechi	Malayalam	Chudu Chintha Than	G. K. Venkatesh	Mohana Kumari
1959	Abba Aa Hudugi	Kannada	Ba Chinna Mohana Nodenna	P. Kalinga Rao	Mohana Kumari & Sohana Kumari
1959	Manaiviye Manithanin Manickam	Tamil	Ennai Ariyamale Enadhullam	S. Hanumantha Rao	K. Jamuna Rani
1961	Kittur Chennamma	Kannada	Thayi Deviyanu Kaane	T. G. Lingappa	
1964	Thumbida Koda	Kannada	Anthintha Hennu	G. K. Venkatesh	

== Death ==
Kalinga Rao died on 21 September 1981.
