= Sugama Sangeetha =

Indian song genre

Sugama Sangeetha, a variety of Bhavageethe, is an Indian musical genre in which poetry in the Kannada language is set to music. It gained recognition with the work of P. Kalinga Rao in the mid -20th century. Mysore Ananthaswamy and C. Aswath developed the form further in the 1960s and 1970s.

== Origin and development ==
It is unclear when exactly Bhavageethe started but in 1920s and 30s there were many attempts to set tunes to poetry. By the 1950s it started taking a more defined shape and a highly talented musician – P. Kalinga Rao – was instrumental in spreading this art form. He set tunes to the poems of many famous Navodaya poets, and gave performances on All India Radio as well as public gatherings. The art form started gaining popularity through his rendering of Udayavaagali Namma Cheluvu Kannada Naadu, Yaaru Hitavaru Ninage, Anathadim Digantadim, Baarayya Beladingale, Brahma Ninge Jodistheeni etc., He laid the foundation of Sugama Sangeetha and hence is considered to be the father of this form.

The 60s and 70s saw many emerging musicians contributing to this field. H.R.Leelavathi, Padmacharan, H. K. Narayana in South Karnataka and Balappa Hukkeri in North Karnataka played a significant role in popularising the art across Karnataka. They also contributed to the field through their own compositions.

The next major personality in the field was Mysore Ananthaswamy. Till then, though there were a lot of compositions, they remained as more or less a subset of classical music from the musical perspective. It was Ananthaswamy who could think out of the box. He not only crossed the barrier of classical music, but was instrumental in adding its own subtleties to Bhaavageethe. With instrumentation also taking different shape by that time, he introduced a number of changes to orchestration. By that time, Bhavageethe was quite popular and businessmen began to publish it in cassette form. With that, 'Nithyotsava' became the first Bhavageethe album to be released. There were a lot of popular albums to his credit. 'Nithyotsava', 'Bhava Sangama', 'Minchu', 'Rathnana Padagalu' to mention a few.

Another young and dynamic talent emerged in the 70s: C. Aswath. Highly talented and a great visionary, his way of blending the lyrical and musical dynamics was hard to match. His way of rendering a song, with emphasis on lyrical dynamics and word power was distinctive. He also brought about a number of changes to the art. Dramatic elements, virtual picturization and other innovations could be observed in abundance in his compositions. He was instrumental in making Shishunala Sharif's poems popular across Karnataka. His popular albums are 'Mysooru Mallige', 'Shishunala Sharif Sahebara Geethegalu', 'Chaitra', 'Kannadave Satya' etc.,

P.Kalinga Rao, Mysore Ananthaswamy and C.Aswath are considered to be the trinity of Sugama Sangeetha. The mid 70s to mid 90s were probably the golden age since, in this period, the major exponents Ananthaswamy and Aswath were at the peak of their careers. The art form had matured enough to be considered an independent genre, and it started adding its own theories through experiments, while commercialisation due to increasing popularity and subsequent dilution of the art had not yet started.

== Notable contributors ==
Many musicians have been successful in popularising Sugama Sangeetha through their compositions or singing, including:

=== Composers ===
P.Kalinga Rao, Mysore Ananthaswamy, C.Aswath, H. K. Narayana, Padmacharan, H.R.Leelavathi, Baalappa Hukkeri, Madikeri Nagendra, Raju Ananthaswamy, N.S.Prasad, B.K.Chandrashekar, B.V.Srinivas, Sunitha Ananthaswamy, Jayashree Arvind, Praveen D Rao, Pravin Godkhindi, M.D.Pallavi, Archana Udupa, Chidambara Kalamanji, Mahesh Mahadev, Upasana Mohan, Vasantha Kanakapur, Gartikere Raganna, Manjula Gururaj, Shamala Jagirdhar.

=== Singers ===
P. Kalinga Rao, Mysore Ananthaswamy, C.Aswath, Baalappa Hukkerimy, Bhimsen Joshi, Sulochana, Madikeri Nagendra, Rathnamala Prakash, Manjula Gururaj, M.K.Jayashree, H. K. Narayana, Shimoga Subbanna, Smt. Shamala Jagirdar, B. K. Sumitra, Kasturi Shankar, Raju Ananthaswamy, B.R. Chaya, Sunitha Ananthaswamy, Yashwanth Halibandi, Nagara Srinivasa Udupa, Sangeetha Katti, M.D.Pallavi, Archana Udupa, Puttur Narasimha Nayak, Rajkumar, S.Janaki, S.P.Balasubramania, Priyadarshini, Anitha Ananthaswamy, Mahesh Mahadev, Aparna Narendra, Malathi Sharma, Ameerbai Karnataki, Sangeetha Katti, Rohini Mohan.

=== Arrangers ===
N.S.Prasad, S.P.Venkatesh, L. Vaidyanathan, N.S.Murali, Praveen D Rao, Pravin Godkhindi, Anoor Anantha Krishna Sharma, Bali.

=== Instrumentalists ===
N.S.Prasad (Mandolin), Praveen Duth Stephen (Keyboard), Saadhu Kokila (Keyboard), Shabbir Ahmed (Keyboard), Krishna Udupa (Keyboard), Bali (Rhythmic Instruments), Venugopal Raju (Tabla), Praveen D Rao (Tabla and Harmonium), Srinivas Achar (Classical and 12 string Guitar), Arun Kumar (Rhythmic Instruments), Pramath Kiran (Rhythmic Instruments), N.S.Murali (Flute), Pravin Godkhindi (Flute), B.K.Chandrashekar (Violin)

== Current situation and future of Sugama Sangeetha ==
Post Ananthaswamy and Aswath era (2000s), there are very few notable and dedicated contributors to the field. Though there were some exceptions like 'Kannadave Satya' event, Sugama Sangeetha could not get a wide base of audience. Another reason could be, the dip in standard of Kannada poetry at the same time. Even today, a full-fledged Sugama Sangeetha concert without the compositions of Kalinga Rao, Mysore Ananthaswamy and C.Aswath is hard to imagine.

Karnataka Sugama Sangeetha Pariashath's 11th annual Sugama Sangeeth conference Geethotsava – 2014 took place on 7–9 February on National College ground, Basavanagudi, Bangalore.

== See also ==
- Music of India
