= Anoor Anantha Krishna Sharma =

Anoor Anantha Krishna Sharma ಆನೂರು ಅನಂತ ಕೃಷ್ಣ ಶರ್ಮ
- Also known as: Shivu
- Born: 29 March 1965 (age 61); Bangalore, Karnataka
- Origin: India
- Genre: Carnatic music
- Occupation: Musician
- Instrument: Mridangam
- Labels: President, Karnataka Sangeetha Nruthya Academy, Govt of Karnataka
- Website: www.anoormusic.com

Anoor Anantha Krishna Sharma (Kannada: ಆನೂರು ಅನಂತ ಕೃಷ್ಣ ಶರ್ಮ, born 1965) is a mridangist from India.

== Early life and background ==
Anoor Anantha Krishna Sharma (popularly known as Shivu) who hails from a family of musicians was born to Vidwan Anoor R Ramakrishna and Smt. Sree Lakshmi. His father Anoor Ramakrishna was a violinist, and a teacher in the Dept. of Music of Bangalore University.

== Career ==
As an artist, Anantha Krishna Sharma started performing professionally at the age of fifteen. He has accompanied many artistes such as Gayathri Venkata Raghavan, T. M. Krishna, H S Prashanth, Sriram Parasuram, Charulatha Ramanujam, M.S. Sheela, T. S. Satyavathi, Jayanthi Kumaresh and C. Honnappa Bhagavathar and others.

Anantha Krishna Sharma has travelled across the globe as an accompanying artiste and for conducting workshops. few notable performances:

- AKKA conference, USA
- Group Jugalbandi with Pranesh and Praveen Gotkhindi called "Ganga Kaveri", USA.
- Played Mridangam for Raghu Dixit Productions
- Composed rhythmic patterns for an ensemble of Sri Ayyanar College of Music, "LayaLahari".
- Composed and directed a "Folk Ensemble" containing only folk instruments with varied folk patterns knit together.
- Composed music for Sanskrit Verses on Hindu GOD's. Produced & Released by "Roots Music" for 53 albums.
- Composed music for a traditional Kathak performance by Nirupama and Rajendra
- Composed and directed a unique rhythmic programme in which utensils from kitchen, furniture and miscellaneous items found at home were used to create a percussion ensemble.

== Recognition ==
- "Sangeet Natak Akademi Award" in 2025 given by the Government of India.
- "Karnataka Kalashri" award in 2018 by Government of Karnataka
- Served as the president of the Karnataka Sangeetha Nruthya Academy, Govt of Karnataka.
- "Chowdaiah Award" in 2025 by Academy of Music, Chowdaiah Memorial Hall
- "Best Mridangam Artist" in 1981 by Gayana Samaja
- "Laya Kala Prathibhamani" Title and Vidwan H. Puttachar Memorial award by Percussive Arts Centre in 2000
- "Best Mridangam Artist" in 1996 from Madras Music Academy
- "Ganakala Shri" in 2005 by Karnataka Ganakala Parishat
- Felicitated by "Hamsadhwani Creations" in 2009
- "Asthana Vidwan" of Sri Kanchi Mutt in 2010 by Sri Kanchi Mutt

== Disciples ==
Anoor Anantha Krishna Sharma has trained percussion artistes like Arun Kumar, G. Guruprasanna.
