= HKN =

HKN may refer to:

== Transportation ==
- Haranya Kheri railway station, in India
- Hawksburn railway station, in Melbourne, Australia
- Hoskins Airport, in Papua New Guinea
- Hucknall station, in England
- Hankou railway station, China Railway telegraph code HKN

== Other uses ==
- HKN, Inc., an American oil and gas company
- Eta Kappa Nu, an engineering honour society of the IEEE
- H. K. Narayana (born 1934), Indian composer
