= Elisabeth Petitpierre =

Swiss physician and missionary in India and Cameroon (1893–1983)

- Born: April 22, 1893; Saint-Aubin-Sauges, Switzerland
- Died: October 9, 1983 (aged 90); Bevaix, Switzerland
- Education: University of Lausanne (MD, 1923); London School of Hygiene and Tropical Medicine
- Occupations: Physician, missionary
- Known for: Director of missionary hospitals in India and Cameroon

Elisabeth Petitpierre (22 April 1893 – 9 October 1983) was a Swiss physician and missionary who worked in India and Cameroun for the Basel Mission. She was one of the first Swiss women to direct a hospital in India, serving as head of the Basel Mission Hospital in Betageri, Karnataka from 1929 to 1954.

== Early life and family ==
Elisabeth Petitpierre was born on 22 April 1893 in Saint-Aubin, Neuchâtel, the youngest of five children in a family closely connected to the local Protestant church. Her father, Fritz Petitpierre, specialized in the absinthe trade, was associated with the Pernod family in Couvet, and served as a member of the local Protestant parish council. Her mother, Marie née Biolley, was the daughter of engineer François Alexis Biolley and sister of Henri Biolley. Marie had joined the Salvation Army, which had opened ministry to women since 1907.

One of Elisabeth's sisters, Marie Petitpierre (1885–1969), also dedicated her life to the Salvation Army, becoming principal of the Swiss officers' school in Bern with the rank of Colonel.

Elisabeth remained unmarried and had no children.

== Education and early career ==
After attending primary and secondary schools in Saint-Aubin, Petitpierre continued her studies at the higher school for young women in Neuchâtel. She then worked as an auxiliary nurse at the Hôpital Pourtalès in Neuchâtel, obtained her federal Matura, and in 1917 began medical studies at the University of Lausanne, completing her degree in 1923. Following hospital internships in Lausanne and Zurich, she entered the London School of Hygiene and Tropical Medicine.

== Missionary work ==
Responding to an invitation from Eva Lombard, Petitpierre joined the Basel Mission in 1927. She arrived in India the same year and remained in Udupi, Karnataka for two years, replacing Eva Lombard as head of the local missionary hospital. In 1929, she moved to Betageri, Karnataka, where she took charge of the Basel Mission hospital that had been established in 1902, treating numerous cases of plague and cholera.

The hospital staff included members from both Switzerland and the local Indian region. Under Petitpierre's leadership, the Betageri hospital expanded considerably, growing from a medium-sized structure to a major regional institution that continues to operate today as the CSI Basel Mission Hospital. She remained in this position until 1954, making her tenure one of the longest of any Swiss woman directing a hospital in India.

Petitpierre viewed missionary medicine as a vehicle for progress serving the emancipation of Indian women. Her letters, some of which were published, sent regularly to her family in Switzerland not only testified to her conviction of the superiority of Christianity and Western medicine over local culture, but also demonstrated genuine curiosity about Indian society, a resolutely pragmatic perspective on the difficulties encountered in India, and an ability to find necessary compromises to resolve them.

In 1954, Petitpierre left India for a mission to Cameroon, where she worked in a leprosy treatment center.

She retired to Switzerland in 1961.

== Works ==
- De quelques cas d'hétérotopies épithéliales de caractère bénin, doctoral thesis, University of Lausanne, 1923
- Allez et guérissez! Lettres d'une docteur missionnaire, 1931
- "D'Oudipi à Bethghéri et de Bethgéri à Oudipi. Quelques comparaisons", in: Bulletin de l'association en faveur des hôpitaux missionnaires aux Indes, 6, 1938
- Médecin et missionnaire en Inde: extraits de lettres, 1929–1954, 1981
