= Rohini Mohan =

Dr. Rohini Mohan
- Born: 15 October 1961 (age 64); Mysuru
- Genres: Sugama Sangeetha, Folk, Film
- Occupation: Musician
- Instrument: Vocalist
- Years active: 1979 till date

Dr. Rohini Mohan (Kannada: ರೋಹಿಣಿ ಮೋಹನ್) is a sugama sangeetha singer from Karnataka. She is known for her bhava-filled renditions. Rashtrakavi Kuvempu was so impressed by her singing that he asked her to record his compositions without orchestra. She is known for her lectures and writings on various aspects of sugama sangeetha.

== Early life ==
She was born on October 15, 1961, to M.S. Nagaraj (retired magistrate) and Anasuya Nagara in Mysore. Mohan began to sing as a child and participated in Makkala Karyakrama (children's programme) for All India Radio at age six. She was successful in interschool and inter-college competition and won best graduating student award most of the years. She studied Carnatic music under Smt. Lakshmi and sugama sangeetha under Smt. H. R. Leelavathy for over 12 years. She studied Hindustani classical music under Smt. Kushala Jagannath. She is an A-grade artist of AIR.

She graduated from Mysore Medical College. Mohan married businessman Sri. M. S. Ram Mohan. Her daughter Ms. Surabhi Mohan is an engineer and singer and her son Mr. Sourabha Ram Mohan, is a C.A.

== Performance ==
She performed under important banners in Karnataka. She has performed in Bombay, Delhi and Coimbatore. She also was invited to perform in Australia, where she sang selected verses of Mankutimmana Kagga.

During 1979-80 she was sponsored by the Department of Information and Broadcasting. She has given programs across Karnataka educating people on family planning. She is an A-grade artist of AIR.

=== International ===
She has performed in:

- Vishwakannada sammelana held in Manchester, UK - 1988
- AKKA sammelana, Baltimore - 2006
- Kaveri Kannada sangha, Tanzania - 2013
- Kannada sangha in Singapore - 2014
- Samskruthi Indo-Japan cultural exchange, Tokyo - 2015.

== Recognition ==
- Karnataka kalashree
- Aryabhata prashasti
- Nadaprabhu Kempegowda prashasti

== Other activities ==
She was a member of Sangeetha Nrithya Academy from 2001 - 2004. She was the founder and director of Bhavana Sugama sangeetha academy. She was a co-trustee of Indu-Rohini Sugama sangeetha trust.

=== Literary contribution ===
She conducted workshop, seminars, and lectures on various aspects of sugama sangeetha. She wrote articles on artists in the field. She sang for Shivaram Karanth's musical drama Kissa goutami, Geeta Ramayana, Veera viragini Akka mahadevi and Prema kashmira. She composed music for her CD Sahane vajrada kavacha. Her albums include Kanasu, Beldingalu (compilation of Rashtrakavi Kuvempu's songs) Jeevana-kale, Milana, Bhava sourabha and Bhava-Bhakti.
