= Eva Lombard =

Swiss physician and missionary who worked in India (1890-1978)

- Born: Evangéline Louise Lombard; February 2, 1890; Eaux-Vives, Geneva, Switzerland
- Died: January 8, 1978 (aged 87); Thônex, Geneva, Switzerland
- Education: University of Geneva (MD, 1918); London School of Hygiene & Tropical Medicine (1920-1921)
- Occupations: Physician, missionary
- Known for: Director of hospital in Udupi, India

Evangéline "Eva" Lombard (2 February 1890 – 8 January 1978) was a Swiss physician and missionary who worked in India for the Basel Mission. She was one of the first Swiss women to direct a hospital in India and served as director of a women's and children's hospital in Udupi, Karnataka, from 1923 to 1954.

== Early life and education ==
Eva Lombard was born in Les Eaux-Vives, Geneva, to Victor Jacques Lombard, a banker who had abandoned his career to work as a chaplain in Genevan penitentiary establishments (notably the prisons of Saint-Antoine and l'Evêché), and Elisabeth née Toméï, from Riga, who taught reading and writing to female prisoners. She grew up with her older sister, Bénédictine Rita Lombard, in a family involved in banking activities and imbued with evangelical Christianity. Her grandfather, Alexandre Lombard, had played a major role in maintaining Sunday as a day of rest.

After completing her schooling in Geneva and obtaining a federal matura at Calvin College, Eva Lombard began medical studies at the University of Geneva in 1912, which she completed with a doctorate in 1918. She was active in Christian student societies and participated in meetings in Constantinople in 1911 and Mohonk Mountain House (New York) in 1913 as a delegate of the World Student Christian Federation. Eva Lombard remained unmarried and childless.

== Medical training and mission work ==
Wishing to engage in mission work as a physician, she went to London to attend courses at the London School of Hygiene & Tropical Medicine (1920-1921). Eva Lombard shared the conviction of her father, who was persuaded he had experienced a miraculous healing in 1889 and was convinced of the divine capacity to act on human bodies.

From 1921 to 1954, Lombard worked in Kanara (State of Karnataka), on the western coast of India, first under the auspices of the Evangelical Canarese Mission – a Swiss Romand organization that had taken over the activities of the Basel Mission in India after the First World War – then, from 1927, under the Basel Mission itself.

In June 1923, after familiarizing herself with hospital management in Mysore and the Kannada language, she inaugurated a new hospital for women and children in Udupi, of which she became director, financed largely by a donation from her mother. The hospital evolved from a small six-bed structure to an important regional institution, having 200 beds at the beginning of the 21st century and renamed Lombard Memorial Hospital. Eva Lombard worked from 1957 to 1960 in another hospital in the region, at Mandagadde, before retiring until her death at the Abbey of Presinge near Geneva (a rest home belonging to the deaconesses of Bern).

With Elisabeth Petitpierre, Eva Lombard was one of the first Swiss female missionaries to have directed a hospital in India for many years.

== Writings and advocacy ==
The letters regularly sent to her family testify to the difficulties encountered and her progressive discovery of local society. A selection of her first missives, with a choice of photographs, was published in German translation in 1924 under the auspices of the Evangelical Canarese Mission, which was then concerned with finding support in the German-speaking part of the Swiss Confederation. Through her lectures given in Switzerland, notably to the Swiss Association of University Women, on her activity and on the situation of women in India, Eva Lombard can be considered as the representative of a feminism imbued with both Protestant values and colonial thought patterns.

== Bibliography ==
- Lombard, Eva: Etude sur un cas d'hydrocéphalie interne chronique, doctoral thesis, University of Geneva, 1918.
- Lombard, Eva: Excursion médicale au pays de Mysore, 1922.
- Lombard, Eva: Briefe einer Missionsärztin, 1924.
- Lombard, Eva: "Le travail médical parmi les femmes au sud de l'Inde", in: Annuaire des femmes suisses, 1929, pp. 44-55.
- Lombard, Eva: Quelques Conseils d'Hygiène à celles qui partent en Mission, 1939.
- Lombard, Eva; Salins, K.A.: Silver Jubilee of the Basel Mission Hospital, Udipi, 1923-1948, 1949.
