= T. S. Sathyavathi =

Indian musicologist

- Born: 30 June 1954 (age 72); Bangalore, Karnataka, India
- Occupations: Musicologist, Sanskrit Professor, Performer and Composer
- Writing career
- Genres: Carnatic classical Music, Literature
- Subjects: Sanskrit, Kannada, Telugu, Tamil
- Website: www.tssathyavathi.com//

T. S. Sathyavathi (born 30 June 1954) is an Indian musicologist, performer and scholar from Bengaluru, Karnataka.

== Biography ==
Sathyavathi was born on 30 June 1954 in Bangalore, Karnataka to T. S. Srinivasa Murthy and Shrirangalakshmi. As a child, she sang before the Maharani of Mysore at the age of two.

== Career ==
Sathyavathi started her Carnatic classical music training under her elder sister Vasantha Madhavi and received her expertise under R. K. Srikantan in Carnatic classical vocal music. She first performed when she was 16 years old. With an interest in research-based study of music, she developed her skills under the guidance of Sangeetha Kalarathna B. V. K. Sastry in musicology and Sangeetha Kalarathna K Venkataraman in Mridangam.

Performer

Sathyavathi gave her first performance at the age of 16, in Karnataka Ganakala Parishat, Bengaluru. She has performed at major venues and sabha-s both in India and abroad. Her performances at SAARC Summit in 1985; Madras Music Academy,

Academic

Sathyavathi served as Professor in Sanskrit until 2014, at VVS first grade college for women, Basaveshwarnagar, Bangalore. She has been a major resource person and has delivered lectures at various prestigious platforms including multiple national and international conferences. As an active academician, she was an advisory at multiple education platforms.

== Awards ==
- Karnataka Kalashree , Govt. of Karnataka
- Musicologist Award, Madras Music Academy, Chennai
- Asthana Vidushi Avani Shankar Mutt, Bangalore
- Jnanasamudra, Mudra, Chennai
- Natyaveda, Mallige Kannada Samgha, USA
