= Abba Aa Hudugi =

1959 film

- Film VCD cover
- Directed by: H. L. N. Simha
- Written by: H. L. N. Simha
- Produced by: H. L. N. Simha
- Starring: Rajkumar; Mynavathi; Pandari Bai
- Cinematography: B. Dorairaj
- Edited by: R. Ramamurthy
- Music by: P. Kalinga Rao
- Distributed by: Sri Jamuna Productions
- Release date: 1959
- Running time: 134 minutes
- Country: India
- Language: Kannada

Abba Aa Hudugi ( transl. Wow, that girl) is a 1959 Indian Kannada-language film written, directed and produced by H. L. N. Sinha based on his own play of the same name. It stars Rajashankar in his debut role, Rajkumar in an extended cameo along with Narasimharaju, Mynavathi and Pandari Bai. It is considered a landmark film in Kannada cinema. Critics have noted that the theme of the movie is loosely based on William Shakespeare 's The Taming of the Shrew. The film was dubbed in Tamil with the title Mangaikku Maangalyame Pradhaanam and was released in 1960. Dialogues were written by S. A. Subbaraman. This film also marked the debut Kannada film for Malayalam actress Sukumari.

== Plot ==
Mynavathi is the arrogant girl, who looks down on men. Rajashankar, plays the protagonist, who marries her, teaches her manners and educates her to behave well. Dr. Rajkumar, who costars, marries the younger sister of Mynavathi. The movie became a trend-setter. P. Kalinga Rao's song "Ba Chinna Mohana Nodenna" became a chart-buster.

== Cast ==
- Rajkumar as Suresh
- Rajashankar as Sarvottama
- Mynavathi as Sharmishtha
- Pandari Bai as Jyoti
- M. V. Rajamma
- Narasimharaju as Shobh
- B. R. Panthulu
- Dikki Madhava Rao
- H. L. N. Simha
- Advani Lakshmi Devi
- Leelavathi in a guest appearance
- Ramadevi
- Sukumari as dancer

== Soundtrack ==
Music by P. Kalinga Rao. Lyrics were written by H. L. N. Simha. Playback singers are P. B. Sreenivas, P. Kalinga Rao, Jikki, S. Janaki, T. S. Bagavathi, Swarnalatha, Mohana Kumari & Sohana Kumari.

#	Title	Singer	Lyrics	Duration (mm:ss)
1	"Hrudaya Deviye Ninna"	P. B. Sreenivas & S. Janaki	H. L. N. Simha	02:55
2	"Baarena Manohara"	Jikki	H. L. N. Simha	02:08
3	"Asheya Gopura Nirmisikondu"	P. B. Sreenivas & S. Janaki	H. L. N. Simha	03:15
4	"Kanna Mucchale Aaduva"	Jikki, T. S. Bagavathi & Swarnalatha	H. L. N. Simha	02:27
5	"Anandadaayakavu Priyakarana Olavu"	S. Janaki	H. L. N. Simha	03:20
6	"Oh Soma Soma"		H. L. N. Simha	02:48
7	"Ba Chinna Mohana Nodenna"	P. Kalinga Rao, Mohana Kumari & Sohana Kumari	H. L. N. Simha	03:27
8	"Andhakara"	T. S. Bagavathi		02:41

Tamil

For the Tamil-dubbed version Mangaikku Maangalyame Pradhaanam, the music was composed by Jeevan. Lyrics were by Puratchidasan & Solai Rasu. Playback singers are P. B. Sreenivas, A. M. Rajah, Jikki, A. P. Komala & K. Rani.

#	Title	Singer	Lyrics	Duration (mm:ss)
1	"Idhaya Deviye Kannae"	P. B. Sreenivas & A. P. Komala	Solai Rasu	02:55
2	""			02:08
3	"Kaadhalil Inbathil Moozhgi"	P. B. Sreenivas & K. Rani		03:15
4	""			02:27
5	""			03:20
6	""			02:48
7	"Malligai Poochendu Paar Athaan"	A. M. Rajah & Jikki	Puratchidasan	03:27
8	""			02:41
