= Kaadu Kudure =

- Directed by: Chandrashekhara Kambara
- Written by: Chandrashekhara Kambara
- Produced by: Narayan Swamy sushellamma NARASEEM BENGLUR, P. P. Rathod; B. Krishnappa
- Starring: Maanu; Sundarashree; Maithili; Malathi Rao
- Cinematography: Sundarnath Suvarna
- Edited by: J. Stanley
- Music by: Chandrashekhara Kambara
- Production company: Wheel Productions
- Release date: 1979
- Running time: 107 minutes
- Country: India
- Language: Kannada

Kaadu Kudure is a 1979 Indian Kannada-language drama film directed, written and composed by Chandrashekhara Kambara and produced by Wheel Productions. The story is based on Kambara's own play Kaadu Kudure. The film's cast came mainly from a theater background including Maanu, Sundarashri, Maithili and Malathi Rao.

Acclaimed singer Shimoga Subbanna's singing of the title song earned him National Film Award for the year 1979.

== Cast ==
- Maanu
- Sundarashree
- Maithili
- Swarnamma
- Malathi Rao
- Krishna
- Annaji
- Kaminidharan
- Narayan swamy s
- Ramachandra

== Soundtrack ==
The music was composed by Chandrashekhara Kambara. The title song earned the singer the National Film Award for the year 1979.

Track listing
No.	Title	Lyrics	Singer(s)	Length
1.	"Iva Yava Oorina"	Chandrashekhara Kambara	P. Susheela
2.	"Kaadu Kaadendare Kaadu"	Bengaloori	S. P. Balasubrahmanyam
3.	"Kaadu Kudure Odibandittha"	Chandrashekhara Kambara	Shimoga Subbanna & Kalpana Shirur

== Awards ==
- National Film Award for Best Male Playback Singer - Shimoga Subbanna for "Kaadu Kudure Odibandittha"
