= Manaiviye Manithanin Manickam =

- Film poster
- Directed by: K. Vembu
- Screenplay by: Makkalanban (dialogues)
- Story by: Kovai Rajagopal
- Produced by: K. Madhanagopal Naidu
- Starring: K. Balaji; Pandari Bai; Vijayakumari
- Cinematography: Rajagopal
- Edited by: P. N. Rao
- Music by: S. Hanumantha Rao
- Production company: K.M.D.V.N. Pictures
- Release date: 31 July 1959
- Country: India
- Language: Tamil

Manaiviye Manithanin Manickam (transl. Wife is the ruby of a man) is a 1959 Indian Tamil-language drama film directed by K. Vembu. The film stars K. Balaji, Pandari Bai and Vijayakumari. It was released on 31 July 1959.

== Plot ==
Lakshmi is a young woman living happily with her husband and child. Her life runs into adversity when her husband starts an affair with another woman. He neglects Lakshmi and their child and also squanders the family wealth on the other woman. Her husband's father who was living with them, leaves the house unable to bear his son's follies. Lakshmi tolerates her husband but she is kidnapped by another person. Then her husband realises his irrational behaviour and fights with the person to rescue his wife. He finally realises that a wife is the ruby of a man.

== Cast ==
Male cast

- K. Balaji
- K. A. Thangavelu
- V. Nagayya
- M. R. Santhanam

Female cast

- Pandari Bai
- Vijayakumari
- M. Saroja

Supporting cast

- Thai Nagesh

== Production ==
Nagesh featured in a minor role and he was credited in the titles as Thai Nagesh.

== Soundtrack ==
Music was composed by S. Hanumantha Rao.

Song	Singer/s	Lyricist	Length
"Thathi Thathi Tavazhum"	Seerkazhi Govindarajan & P. Susheela	Kannadasan	03:23
"Kaathirupom Kaipidipom"	Thiruchi Loganathan & A. G. Rathnamala	Era. Pazhanichami	
"Un Thiruvilaiyadal"	Thiruchi Loganathan	V. A. Gopalakrishnan	02:38
"Fraudu Fraudu Fradu"	T. A. Mothi	Kovai Rajagopal	01:38
"Annam Aval Nadai"	C. S. Jayaraman	S. D. S. Yogi	
"Pongi Varum Nilavenave"	K. Jamuna Rani	Puratchidasan	
"Ennai Ariyamale Enadhullam"	P. Kalinga Rao & K. Jamuna Rani	Adhimoolam	03:53
"Podhai Tharum Sugathile"	C. S. Jayaraman	Kannadasan	01:30
"Vetri Vandha Podhum"	C. S. Jayaraman	Kannadasan	
"Kannil Pirandhu Vandha"	C. S. Jayaraman	Kannadasan	
"Anbu Mugam Kaattinaan"	A. P. Komala	Kovai Rajagopal	
"Buddharaiyum Muhamadhaiyum"	Thiruchi Loganathan	Salem Ramasami Pavalar	
"Yengudhu Manasu Asai Machan"	Jikki & Group	A. Maruthakasi	09:12
"Jeeviya Vilakke Nee"	T. A. Mothi & P. Leela		03:23

== Reception ==
Kanthan of Kalki said the film was a headache. The film did not do well at the box office.
