= Mithayi Mane =

2005 film directed by Aarathi

- Directed by: Aarathi
- Screenplay by: Yashaswini
- Produced by: Chandrasekar Desigoudar
- Starring: Aditi
- Cinematography: Santosh Rai Pathaje
- Edited by: B S Kemparaj
- Music by: N.S. Prasad
- Production company: Shore Birds Entertainment
- Release date: 27 January 2006
- Country: India
- Language: Kannada

Mithayi Mane (released in film festivals under the translated title Candy House) is a 2005 Kannada-language film directed by Aarathi (whose daughter wrote the screenplay). The title was inspired by the Brothers Grimm fairy tale, Hansel and Gretel. The film explores the theme of how children would find fulfillment in a candy house they came across in a forest. Actually, the sweetness and fulfillment is illusory; the reality is that there is a witch living inside who uses the appearance of the house to catch children, so she can cook them and eat them.

The film was released in film festivals in 2005 and theatrically released in 2006.

== Plot ==
Mithai Mane is the story of an 11-year-old girl named Ganga, who leaves from a poor village to work as a maid for a well-off family in the city. Her situation is compared throughout the movie to the plight of Gretel (held prisoner in the witch's cottage), and her story is interwoven with a voice-over narration of the Hansel and Gretel story. One of Ganga's tasks is to bring the household children's lunch boxes to their private school. At the school she is befriended by Swathi, a schoolgirl who wants to help her. As their friendship grows, Ganga becomes more aware of her surroundings. Child labor is at the heart of this film, but it is treated with gentle irony and there is no assignment of blame. The well-to-do family is self-absorbed and insensitive, not cruel and exploitative. The audience, however, has seen the plight of the villagers and the contrast with the opulence of the city-dwellers is obvious. The most powerful image is the open-eyed honesty that Ganga brings with her from the village. These qualities will eventually force her to leave the sugar-coated house in the city where everything is a little too sweet.

== Cast ==
- Aditi as Ganga alias Putti
- Dharmendra Urs
- Surabhi J. Herur as Ganga's mother
- Hanumantha Raju
- Ragashree Prasad
- Akshara
- Deeksha Naik
- Panchami
- Lakshmi Nada Gowda
- Padma Shimoga
- Shailashree
- Suchitha Anthunadhan
- Pallavi
- Raghavendra

== Reception ==
R. G. Vijayasarathy Rediff.com wrote that "Mitaayi Mane is certainly a film to be watched not only by the elite but also by people who understand good cinema". A critic from Sify wrote, "When 60 to 115 million children in India are trapped in child labour, the effort of the ‘Shore Birds Entertainment’ is commendable".

== Awards ==
Mithayi Mane won the Best Children's Film award for 2004–05 issued by the Government of Karnataka, and Aditi won the Best Child Actor award for her role in the film. Aditi also won an International award "the Golden Cairo Award" in her debut for the film Mithayi Mane.
