= Arun Date =

Indian singer

Arun Date (4 May 1934 – 6 May 2018) was a well known Marathi singer of Bhavageete.

== Career ==
Originally a textile engineer from VJTI, Mumbai, Arun left his high-profile job after 28 years of service in order to pursue a career in singing. His song "Shukratara Mandavara" was adjudged as song of the month by Mumbai Radio Station in 1962. It was composed by Shriniwas Khale who taught him the song and it became a super-hit. After his initial success he continued to perform, singing Marathi songs of the "Bhavgeet" genre (sentimental songs) like "Shatada Prem Karave", "Ya Janmavar", "Bhatukalichya Khela Madhali" and many others that became achieved great popularity in Maharashtra. Arun was the first recipient of the Gajananrao Vatave Puraskar..

== Personal life ==
Arun Date's brother, Ravi Date, is a well-known tabla player.
