= R. K. Srikantan =

Indian Carnatic classical vocalist (1920–2014)

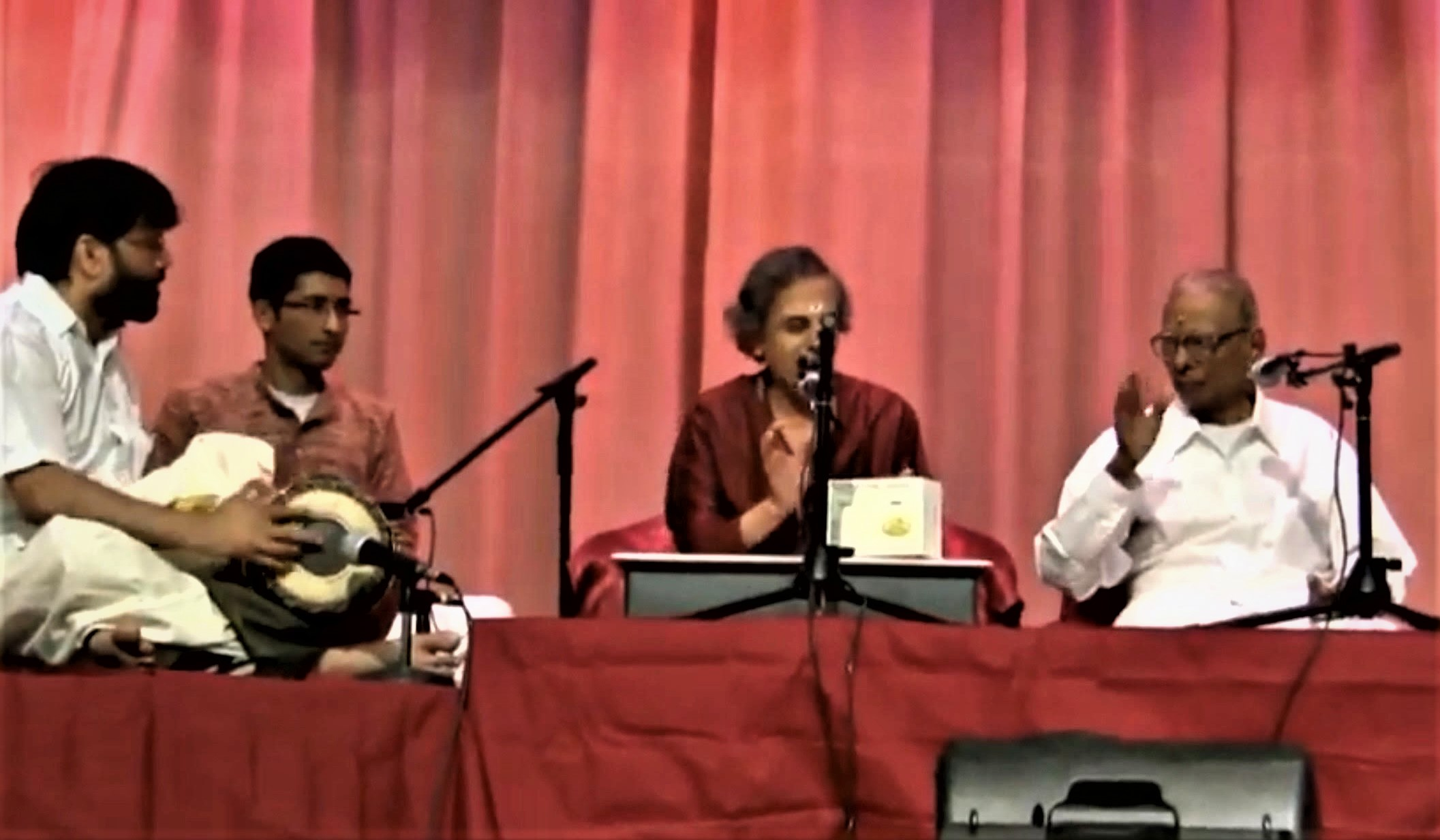
- Srikantan at Carnatic concert with T. S. Nandakumar and group in 2011
- Born: Rudrapatna Krishnasastri Srikantan; 14 January 1920; Rudrapatna, Hassan district, Karnataka
- Died: 17 February 2014 (aged 94)
- Occupation: vocalist
- Children: Rathnamala Prakash, R. S. Ramakanth, R. S. Kumar

Rudrapatna Krishnashastri Srikantan (14 January 1920 – 17 February 2014), known as R. K. Srikantan, was a vocalist of the South Indian Carnatic musical tradition. He was awarded the Madras Music Academy's Sangeetha Kalanidhi in 1995.

== Early life ==
Srikantan was born to a Sankethi Brahmin family in Rudrapatna, Hassan district of Karnataka, on Makara Sankranti day, 14 January 1920. His father R Krishnashastri was an orator, singer of Gamaka (storytelling), playwright, poet, and harikatha vidwan. His grandfather, Narayanaswamy of Bettadapura, also known as Veena Narayanaswamy, was a veena instrumentalist and a contemporary of Veene Sheshanna and Veene Subbanna.

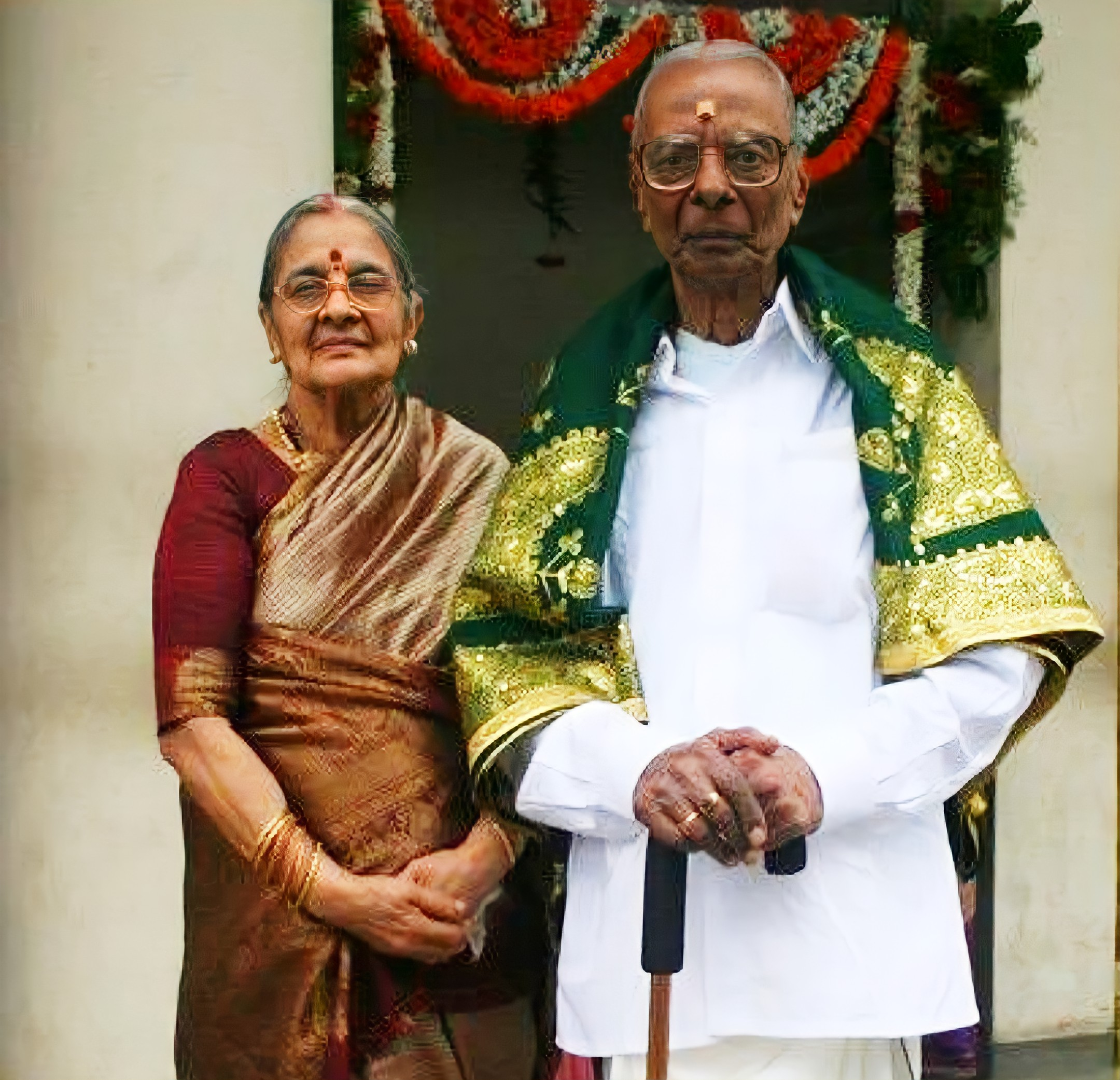
Srikantan with his wife, Maithreyi

== Education ==
Srikantan went to Sadvidya Pathashala and Banumaiah High School in Mysore. Later, he obtained his BA degree from the Maharaja College, Mysore.

== Training ==
His father, Krishnashastri, was Srikantan's first tutor. He moved to Mysore after his wife's death. Later, Srikantan was mentored by his brother R. K. Venkatarama Shastri, a violin player who often accompanied M S Subbulakshmi. Srikantan also received training from veteran musicians like Veene Subbanna and Chowdiah.

== Excellence ==
Srikantan was an avid attendee at all concerts in Mysore during the era of the Wodeyars. Srikantan during those days was highly influenced by the Nadaswaram vidwans of his time. He was also highly influenced by maestros of the likes of Semmangudi Srinivasa Iyer, Ariyakudi Ramanuja Iyengar, Musiri Subramania Iyer, G N Balasubramaniam and Maharajapuram Viswanatha Iyer.

Srikantan's singing is characterised by sahitya shuddham (correct pronunciation and diction) and shruti shuddham (refinement of pitch).

== Awards ==
Among the award received by Srikantan are:

- Central Sangeet Natak Akademi Award by the Government of India in 1979.
- State Sangeet Natak Akademi Award by the Government of Karnataka in 1981.
- Sangeetha Kalanidhi Title from the Madras Music Academy in 1995.
- Kanaka-Purandara Award by the Government of Karnataka.
- Padma Bhushan Award by Government of India in 2011.
- Sangeet Natak Akademi Tagore Ratna in 2012.
- Sangeetha Prabhakara Award in 2013
- Nada Vidya Bharati Award in 2012 by Visakha Music and Dance Academy.
- Sathguru Thyagaraja Hamsadhwani Award in 2011
- Gana Bhaskara Title by Annavasathi Sangha, Bangalore in 1947.
- Best Teacher Title by the Bangalore city corporation in 1973.
- Ganakala Praveen Title by the Guru Seva Mandali, Bangalore in 1976.
- Karanataka Sangeeta Ratna under the joint auspices of Sri. Parthasarathy Sabha, Forum of music lovers and Saraswati Gana Sabha, Bangalore in 1978.
- Gayakachoodamani Title by the Tulaseevana Sangeetha Parishath, Trivendrum, in 1983.
- T.T.K. Memorial Award by the Music Academy, Madras in 1983 as the best Musician.
- Haridasa Award by the Purandara Pratishthana, Bangalore in 1991.
- Palant Subramanya Pillai Award by Percussive Art Centre, B'lore in 1992.
- Chowdaiah National Level Award by Academy of Music, 1994.
- Saptagiri Sangeetha Vidwanmani by Thyagaraja Trust, Tirupathi, 1994.
- Karnataka Rajya Sangeetha Vidwan Title by Government of Karnataka in the year 1994.

== Teaching ==
Srikantan rendered teaching programs on the radio (On Amruthavarshini 100.1 FM).

== Death ==
Srikantan died on 17 February 2014 after a brief illness.

== Disciples ==
Some of Srikantan's disciples include his son R S Ramakanth, B. K. Anantha Ram (Flutist), M. S. Sheela, T. S. Satyavati, R. A. Ramamani, M. T. Selvanarayana, Amith Nadig, Vid. Kadaba Lakshmikanth and H. K. Narayana.

His daughter Rathnamala Prakash is also his disciple, who achieved fame and success in Sugama Sangeetha or light music.
