= Archana Udupa =

Indian singer

- Born: 3 February 1979 (age 46); Nagara, Shivamogga, Karnataka
- Genres: Devotional, classical and film songs
- Occupation: Singer

Archana Udupa (born 3 February 1979) is an Indian singer. She sings devotional, classical and film songs. She is graded artist of All India Radio and Doordarshan. She won Zee TV TVS Sa Re Ga Ma Pa contest of singing in 1998. Archana Udupa is the first person of south Indian origin to win Hindi film song singing contest. As of now she has sung in more than 1000 cassettes and CDs (Albums).

She won the Karnataka State Film Award for Best Female Playback Singer for her song in the film Bhageerathi in 2012. She also judged for famous singing reality show Kannada Kogile for two seasons along with Chandan Shetty and Sadhu Kokila. She married Sriranga, a lawyer and son of musician Shimoga Subbanna, in 2002.

== Awards ==
2023 - Silver Screen Woman Achiever Award - For outstanding contribution to film industry

2011 - Best Female Playback Singer, Karnataka State Film Award
