= Bhavageete =

Indian form of poetry and music

Bhaavageete or Bhavageeth (literally 'emotion poetry') is a form of poetry and pop music in India. Most of the poetry sung in this genre pertains to subjects like love, nature, and philosophy, and the genre itself is not much different from ghazals, though ghazals are bound to a peculiar metre. This genre is quite popular in Karnataka, Andhra Pradesh and Maharashtra. This genre may be called by different names in other languages. In Telugu, they are known as Bhava Geethaalu. Cherukuri Ramarao is one of the popular writers of Bhava Geethaalu in Telugu.

== Kannada Bhavageete ==
Kannada Bhavageete (Kannada: ಭಾವಗೀತೆ) draws from modern Kannada poetry.

Notable modern Kannada poets whose works have been set to music include Kuvempu, D. R. Bendre, Gopalakrishna Adiga, K.S. Narasimhaswamy, G.S. Shivarudrappa, K. S. Nissar Ahmed, Raju Ananthaswami.

In 1988, as part of Sugama Sangeetha troupe, Sunitha Ananthaswamy toured the United States and gave 28 concerts for the Kannada diaspora, along with her brother Raju and famous father Mysore Ananthaswamy.

=== Popular Bhavageetes in Kannada ===
- Tanuvu ninnadu, manavu ninnadu - Kuvempu
- Anandamaya ee jagahrudaya - Kuvempu
- Oh nanna chetana - Kuvempu
- Ealladaru Iru - Kuvempu
- Baa Chakori - Kuvempu
- Yaava Mohana Murali Kareyitu - Gopalakrishna Adiga
- Ede tumbi haadidenu andu naanu baavartha - G.S. Shivarudrappa
- Ondu munjaavinali - Chennaveera Kanavi
- Ee dinantha samayadali - K. S. Nissar Ahmed
- Jogada siri belakinalli - K. S. Nissar Ahmed
- Kaanada kadalige - G. S. Shivarudrappa
- Rayaru bandaru mavana manege - K. S. Narasimhaswamy
- Deepavu ninnade gaaliyu ninnade - K. S. Narasimhaswamy
- Amma naanu devaraane - H. S. Venkateshamurthy
- Baa illi sambhavisu - Kuvempu
- Ello hudukide illada devara - G. S. Shivarudrappa
- Naakutanti - aavu eevina - D. R. Bendre
- Ilidu baa taayi - D. R. Bendre
- Nee hinge nodabeda - D.R. Bendre
- Mugila Maarige Raaga Ratiya - D.R. Bendre
- Ee Banu Ee Chukki - H. S. Venkateshamurthy
- Aa Bettadalli Beladingalalli - Siddalingaiah
- Elli Jaaritho Manavu - N. S. Lakshminarayan Bhat
- Ninna Kangala Koladi - M.N.Vyaasa Rao

== Marathi Bhavageet ==
Marathi Bhavageet (Marathi:भावगीत) draws from Marathi language poetry.

Notable composers/performers/singers include Hridaynath Mangeshkar, Lata Mangeshkar, Asha Bhosle, Sudhir Phadke, Arun Date, and Suman Kalyanpur.

Poets include Suresh Bhat (who made Marathi ghazals popular) and Shanta Shelke.

=== Popular Marathi Bhavageet ===
- Shukratara - Arun Date
- Ya Janmavar - Arun Date
- Swargangechya Kathavarti - Arun Date
- Bhatukalichya Khelamadhali - Arun Date
- Hee Waat Door Jate - Asha Bhosle
- Chandane Shimpit Jaashi - Asha Bhosle
- Toch Chandrama Nabhaat - Sudhir Phadke
- Mawalatya Dinakara - Lata Mangeshkar
- Asa Bebhan Ha Wara - Lata Mangeshkar
- Tinhi Sanja SakheF Milalaya - Lata Mangeshkar
- Pratima Uri Dharuni - Lata Mangeshkar
- Airanichya Deva Tula - Lata Mangeshkar
- Rimjhim Jharati Shravan Dhara - Suman Kalyanpur
- Shabda Shabda Japuni Thewa - Suman Kalyanpur
- Omkar Pradhan Roop Ganeshache - Suman Kalyanpur
- Keshava Madhava - Suman Kalyanpur
- Ketakichya Bani Tithe - Suman Kalyanpur
- Jithe Sagara Dharani Milate - Suman Kalyanpur
- Naavika Re Wara Wahe Re - Suman Kalyanpur
- Nakalat Saare Ghadale - Suman Kalyanpur
- Waat ithe Swapnatil - Suman Kalyanpur

== See also ==
- Natya Sangeet
