= Betageri Krishnasharma =

Indian writer

Dr. Betageri Krishnasharma
- Born: 16 April 1900; Betageri, Gokak, Belgaum district, Karnataka, British Raj
- Died: 30 October 1982 (aged 82)
- Education: Class 7
- Occupations: Writer, editor, and journalist
- Relatives: Shrinivas Rao(Father); Radhabai(Mother)
- Writing career
- Pen name: Anandakanda
- Language: Kannada
- Genres: Poetry, Short stories, Novel, Drama, Metaphor, Criticism, Research, Folklore, Autobiography and Press editing
- Notable awards: Karnataka Sahitya Academy Award
- Website: www.betagerianandakanda.org/index.php

Betageri Krishnasharma (16 April 1900 – 30 October 1982), popularly known by his pen name Anandakanda was a writer, editor and journalist from Karnataka. His writings included different genres such as poetry, short stories, novels, dramas, metaphors, criticism, research, folklore and autobiographies.

He called for the Unification of Karnataka.

== Literary works ==
=== Novels ===
- Ashanti Parva (Historical Novel based on Vijayanagara Empire)
- Magala Maduve
- Mallikarjuna (Historical Novel based on Vijayanagara Empire)
- Rajayogi (Historical Novel based on Vijayanagara Empire)
- Sudarshana

=== Collection of stories ===
- Badatanada Baalu Namma Baduku
- Janapada Jeevana
- Matanaduva Kallu
- Samsar Chitra (of total 7)

=== Review works ===
- Karnataka Janajeevana
- Namma Samskriti Parampare
- Sahityavu Sagiruva Daari
- Sahitya Vihara

=== Poems ===
- Bhakthi Kusumavali (1918)
- Kannada Nudi
- Naavu
- Odeda Kannadi

=== Collection of poems ===
- Arunodaya
- Gandhi Geetasapthaka
- Kaara Hunnime
- Nalwadugalu
- Odanadi
- Rameyumeyara Samvada
- Rashtriya Padhyamale
- Rashtriya Padyavali
- Virahini (1935) (of total 13)

=== Collection of Vachanas ===
- Samajika Samvachanagalu (1981)

== Awards and honours ==
- Karnataka Sahitya Academy Award
- Honorary Doctorate from Karnatak University
- Presided the chair of Karnataka Janapada Sammelana

== Recognition ==
- Kannada Pustaka Pradhikara has published a book on Dr. Betageri Krishnasharma that has been authored by Dr. Nijalingappa Mattihal
- Novelist Dr. Raghavendra Patil has authored a biography book named Anandakanda:Betageri Krishna Sharma that has been published by Sahitya Akademi, New Delhi
