= Betageri =

- Village
- Country: India
- State: Karnataka
- District: Belagavi
- Talukas: Gokak

Government
  - Type: Panchayat raj

Languages
  - Official: Kannada
- Time zone: UTC+5:30 (IST)
- Postal code: 591 233
- ISO 3166 code: IN-KA

Betageri is a village in Belagavi district in the north west part of Karnataka state, India. The Kannada poet Betageri Krishnasharma was born here. Before the integration of Karnataka the whole of Belagavi district and other some districts of the north west were part of Bombay Karnataka.
