= Raju Ananthaswamy =

Music director

- Born: 19 April 1973
- Died: 17 January 2009 (aged 35); Bengaluru, Karnataka, India
- Occupations: Singer, composer, music director, & actor
- Father: Mysore Ananthaswamy

Raju Ananthaswamy (1973–2009) was a music composer and director. He worked on Sugama Sangeetha for more than 15 years. He was the son of vocalist Mysore Ananthaswamy. He died in 2009, at the age of 35 years.

== Personal life ==
Raju Ananthaswamy began playing music in his father's troupe at a young age. He had his initial Tabala lessons from Vid. Gunda Shastry of Hanumantanagar, Bengaluru. In addition to tabla, he could play a variety of other musical instruments including guitar, mandolin and keyboard.

Raju's compositions and singing style was greatly influenced by his father, late Mysore Ananthaswamy . His songs, Krishna Yenabaarade, Madhava, Beldingal raathrili, Tunge Dadadalli, Heege ondu Raathri are among his more important compositions. He was well known for his songs "Yaava mohana murali kareyitu" from America America and "Hottare yedbittu" from the movie, Rishi.

Raju was an artiste in All India Radio and regularly appeared on Radio City, Doordarshan, Udaya TV, Zee Kannada and ETV TV channels. He performed with his troupe all year round. He used to set aside his weekends to teach Sugama Sangeetha to several students. Though Raju had set to tune more than 200 poems, he enjoyed singing his father's compositions, which he also aspired to preserve and promote, during his performances. He was able to pass these on to the younger generation as well as his many students, through his Sugama Sangeetha schools in Mysore and Bangalore.

=== Notable performances ===
- Hampi Utsava
- SAARC Summit Cultural Evening
- Vasanta Habba
- All India Lawyers Meet *Dasara Utsava
- International Trade Fair in Delhi
- Berkely Film Awards

=== Albums ===
- Tribute to My Father
- Ananta Namana
- Hoovu
- Deepotsava
- Savitha
- Hale Beru Hosa Chiguru
- Hari ninna murali
- Madhava
- Bere Madhuveke
- Rathnana Padagalu
- Hari Ninna Murali
- Oh Mani Oh Doctor
- Yava Mohana murali kareyitu

=== Concert tours ===
- Australia – 2004
- Abu Dhabi and Dubai – 1994
- Malaysia – 2004
- New Zealand – 2004
- Singapore – 2001 & 2004
- UK – April 2008
- US – 1988 & 1998

=== Original score for TV serials ===
- Rajini
- Dum dum digadiga
- Yello jogappaninnaramane
- Manthana
- Geethadarshana
- Nela mugilu
- Mussanje katha prasanga
- Movie-Galige Asst. Music Director

=== Filmography as actor ===
- Dhad Dhad (2003)
- Abhi (2003)
- Chigurida Kanasu (2003)...Seetharam
- Abbabba Entha Huduga (2004)
- Kalasipalya (2004)...Kencha's friend
- Kanchana Ganga (2004)
- Thunta (2005)
- Amrithadhare (2005)
- Mata (2006)
- Jackpot (2006)...Kyata

== Death ==
Raju Ananthaswamy developed kidney complications and was admitted to Sagar Apollo Hospital, his condition deteriorated rapidly and his death was attributed to kidney failure on 17 January 2009. He was survived by his mother Shanta Ananthaswamy and three sisters. He was later buried in Padavaralli.
