= M. S. Sheela =

M.S.Sheela
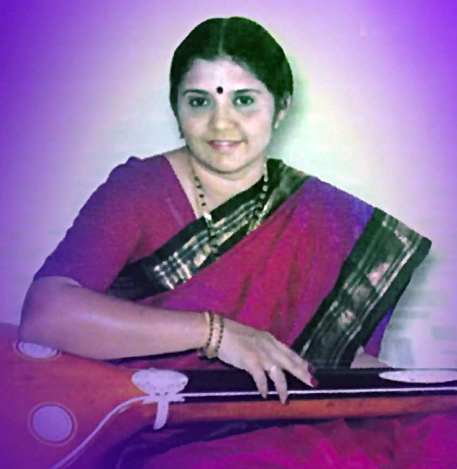

Background information
- Origin: India
- Genre: Indian classical music
- Occupation: Classical vocalist
- Website: www.mssheela.com

M S Sheela is a Carnatic classical, light music and devotional singer. She is a AIR and Doordarshan artist in both classical and light music. She was awarded Sangeeta Nataka Academy award by the president of India in the year 2019.

== Biography ==
M. S. Sheela got her initial musical guidance from her mother M. N. Rathna, a musician. later continued learning Carnatic music under R. K. Srikantan.

== Singing career ==
M S Sheela has sung for albums like 'Srividyadarshana' (compositions of Jayachamarajendra Wadiyar), 'Ninada' (compositions of Veene Sheshanna) and ′Sadashiva Madhurya′ (compositions of Mysore Sadashiv Rao) series produced by All India Radio, Bangalore.

== Contributions to Indian Classical Music ==
Sheela and her husband through Hamsadhwani creations organise many music workshops, programmes by youth and seasoned musicians. An annual Hamsadhwani festival is also observed by Hamsadhwani creations. They also felicitate great achievers of the field through ′Hamsadhwani Puraskara′.

== Awards and honours ==
- Sangita Kala Acharya from Madras Music Academy in 2019.
- Rajyotsava Prashasti from Government of Karnataka.
- Ganakalashree by Ganakala Parishat
- Chowdaiah Award by The Academy of Music
