= H. S. Venkateshamurthy =

Indian poet and playwright (1944–2025)

H. S. Venkatesha Murthy
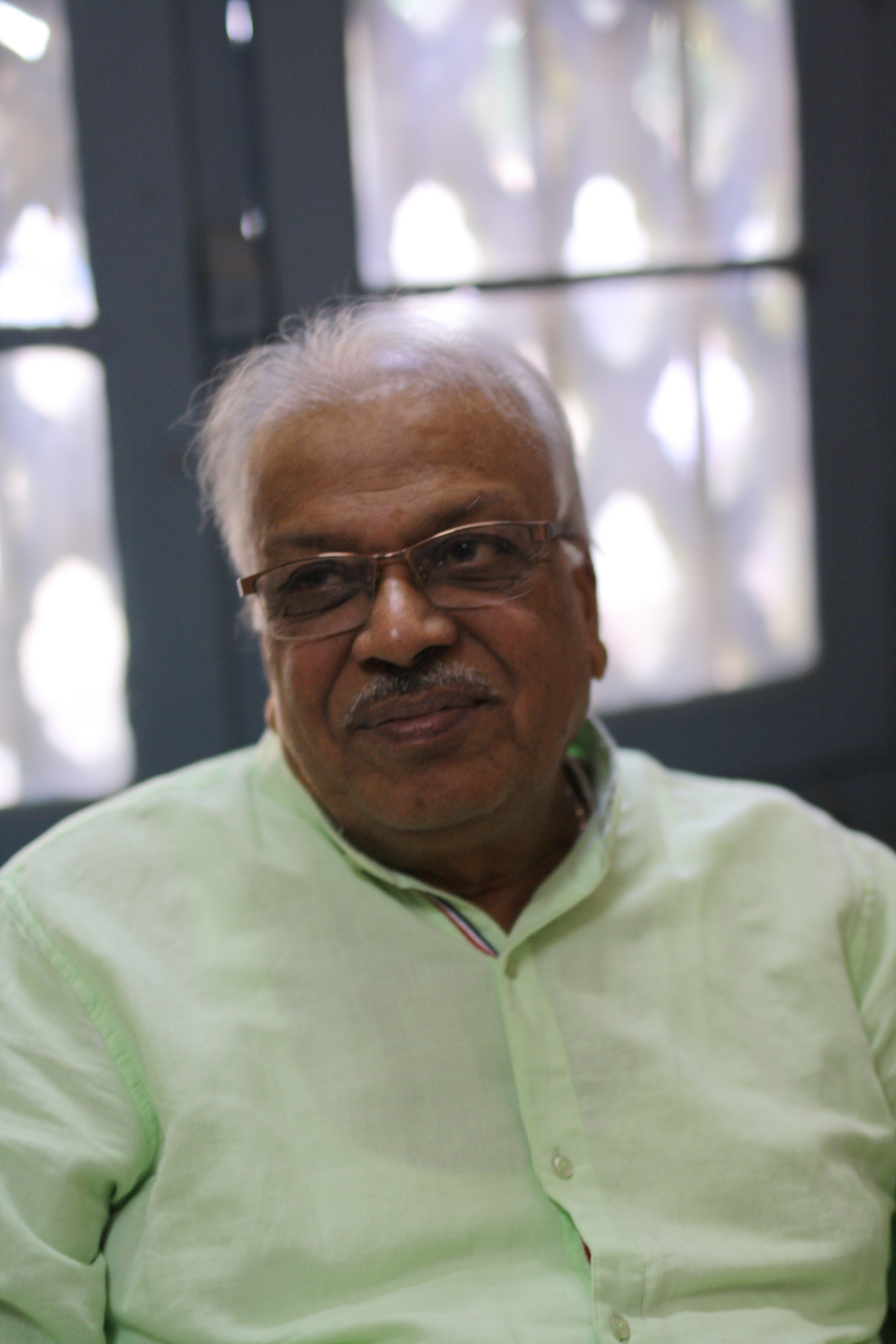
- Born: 23 June 1944; Hodigere, Chitradurga, Kingdom of Mysore, India
- Died: 30 May 2025 (aged 80); Bengaluru, Karnataka, India
- Education: Central College, Bangalore
- Occupations: Poet, playwright
- Awards: Karnataka Sahitya Academy Award (1993); Rajyotsava Award (2003); Sahitya Akademi Translation Prize (1991)

Hodigere Shanbhog Venkateshamurthy (23 June 1944 – 30 May 2025), often referred to by his initials, HSV, was an Indian poet, playwright, critic and literary scholar who wrote in Kannada. He also wrote lyrics for Kannada films, occasionally serving as screenwriter and writing dialogues.

Murthy was born to Nagarathnamma and Narayana Bhatta in the remote village of Hodigere in the erstwhile Kingdom of Mysore, then as part of Chitradurga district (in present-day Davanagere district). After attending school in his native village, he studied in Holalkere followed by collegiate training at Chitradurga. He completed his master's degree in Kannada at Central College Bangalore. He worked as lecturer and professor for more than three decades at St. Joseph's College of Commerce, Bangalore, and remained in Bangalore after retirement. He received his Doctorate of Literature for his research on Kannadadalli Kathana Kavanagalu.

== Literary career ==
Murthy was a pre-navya writer and Bhavageete poet. As of 2020, he published more than 100 books in Kannada. His play Hoovi was recognized by the ICSE educational board in India as a textbook for students of class nine and ten.

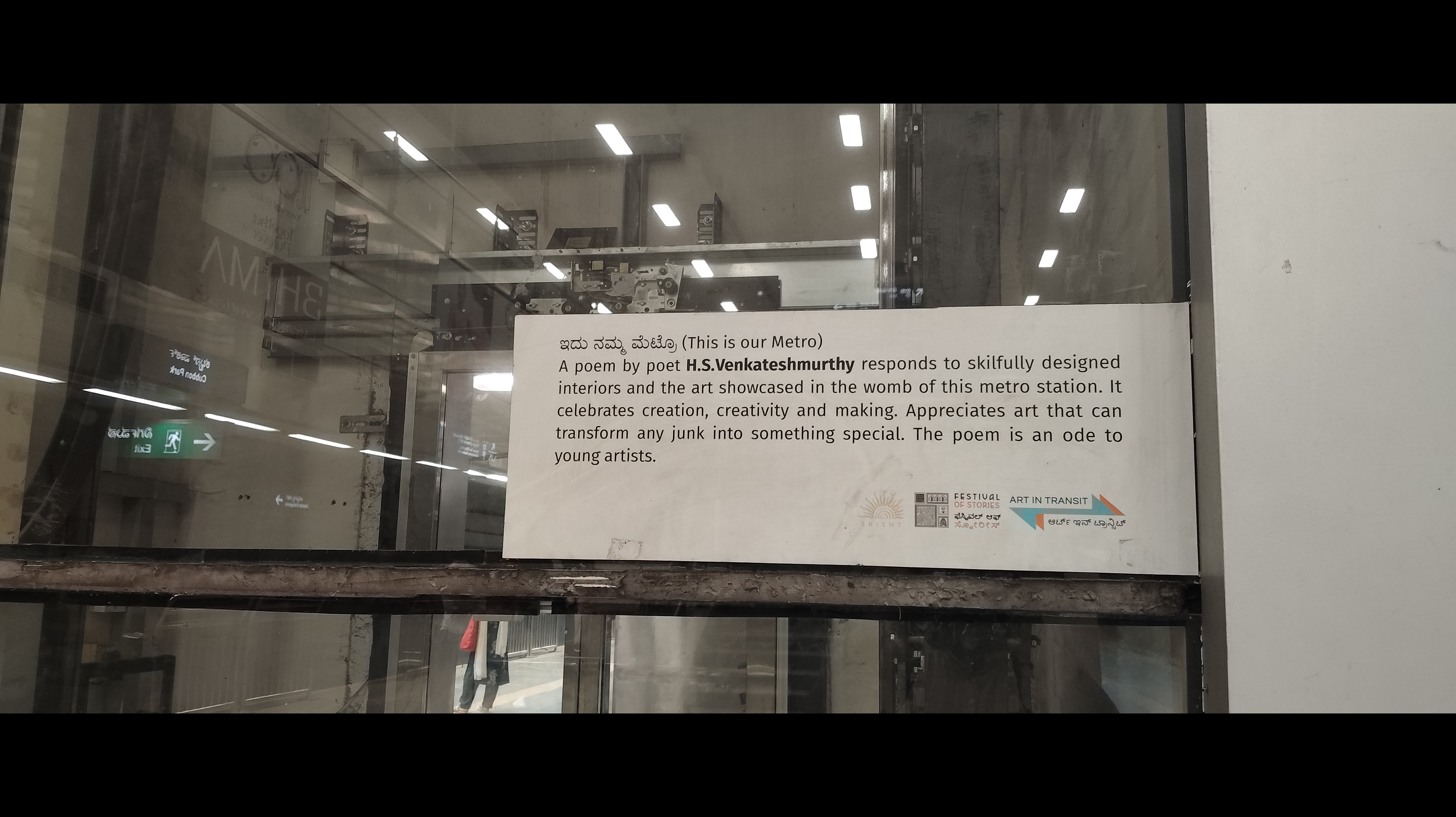
text mentioning Dr HS Venkatesha Murthy poem at cubbon park metro station Bengaluru

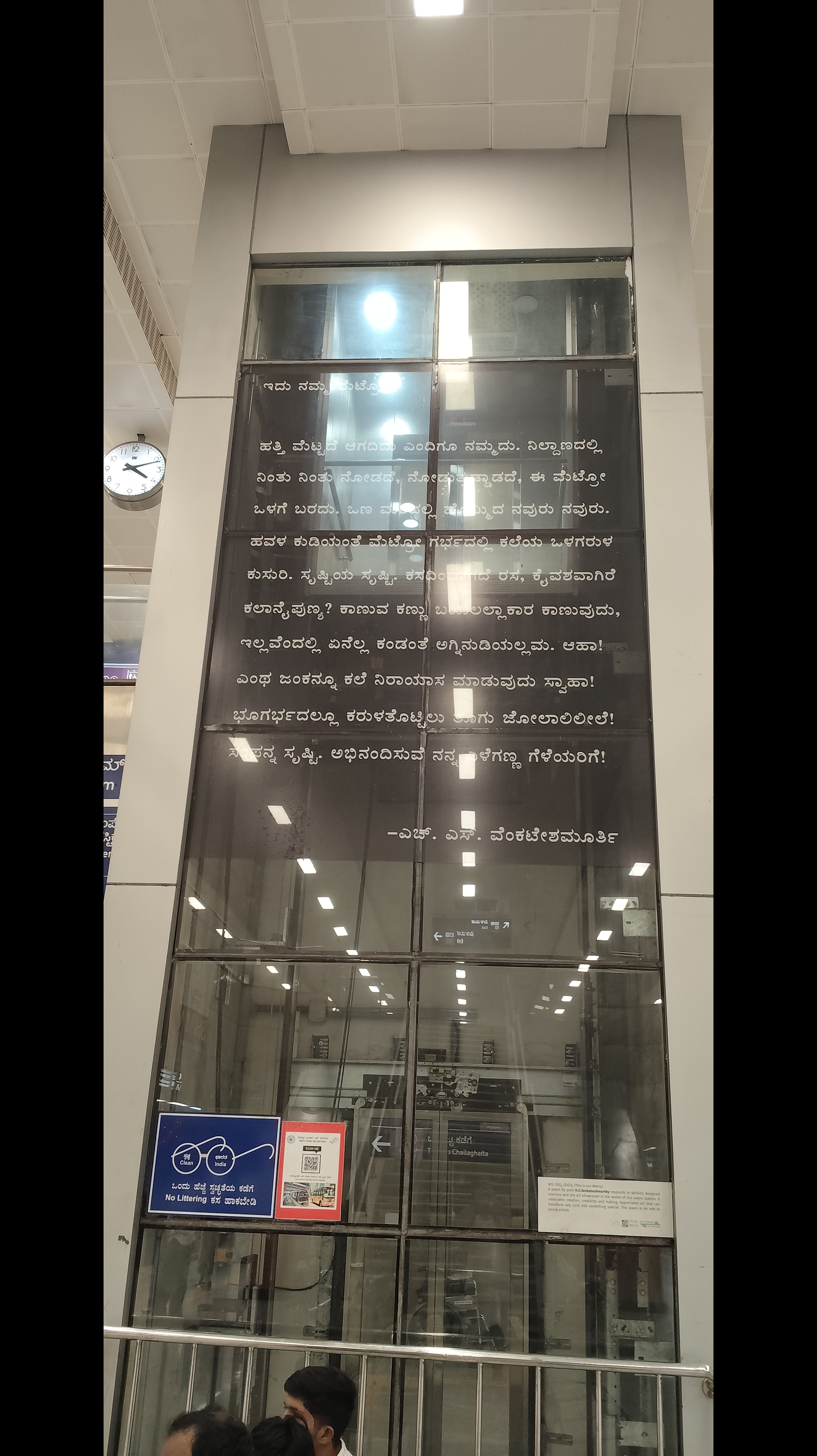
poem on Bengaluru metro rail by Dr HS Venkatesha Murthy at cubbon park metro station

== Death ==
Venkateshamurthy died at a private hospital in Kengeri, Bengaluru, on 30 May 2025, at the age of 80.

== Contributions to film ==
- Balondu Bhavageethe: "Kamana Billina Mele" (song)
- Chinnari Mutta: Story, dialogue and all songs
- Kotreshi Kanasu: All songs
- America America: "Banalli odo megha " (song)
- Kraurya: Dialogue
- Mythri: Song
- Kirik Party: "Thoogu Manchadalli Koothu" (song)
- Sapta Saagaradaache Ello – Side B: "Irabeku Iruvanthe Toredu Saavira Chinte" (song)

== Contributions to television ==
- Mukta: Title song
- Maha Parva: Title
- Magalu Janaki: Title song

== Awards ==
- Bala Puraskar Award from Central Sahitya Academy, India (2013)
- V.M. Inamdar Memorial Award for his book Kumaravyasa Kathanthara
- Filmfare Award for Best Lyricist – Kannada at the 66th Filmfare Awards South for his work on Hasiru Ribbon
