= N. S. Lakshminarayan Bhat =

Indian poet (1936–2021)

N. S. Lakshminarayana Bhatta
- Born: 29 October 1936; Shivamogga, India
- Died: 6 March 2021 (aged 84); Bangalore, Karnataka, India
- Occupations: Professor; poet; translator
- Writing career
- Language: Kannada

Nailady Shivarama Lakshminarayan Bhatta (29 October 1936 – 6 March 2021) was a Kannada poet from Shivamogga district. He was awarded the Karnataka Sahitya Academy award in 1974.

== Career ==
As academic

After completing a M.A., from Maharaja's College in Mysore and a PhD at Bangalore University, he served briefly as a teacher of Kannada literature at Acharya Pata Shala (APS College) in Bangalore before joining Bangalore University. There he served as a professor and chairman of the department for more than 20 years serving as the dean (1990) of the Arts College prior to his retirement from the University.

As poet

His very early work Horalu Daariyalli Kaavya (Poetry on a fun road), in the early 1970s earned him the Sahitya Academy award and announced him to the literary world as a poet of much skill. Bhatta has translated 50 sonnets of William Shakespeare, the poetry of TS Eliot and works of poet Yeats into Kannada language. The Masti Award was given to poet N.S. Lakshminarayana Bhatta in 2007. He has been recognized for his contribution to modern Kannada poetry and literary criticism with numerous awards and honors. His effort related to popularizing the works of the bard Shishunala Sharif led to a renaissance in the Kannada Bhavageetha movement, earning Dr. Bhatta the moniker of "Sharif Bhatta".

His work "Readings in Kannada" on making Kannada more accessible to the masses has been among the popular books ever written in that realm and sold over 200,000 copies over several editions. He has been honored with numerous awards including the Central Sahitya Academy Award as well as 'Being Different' award from PGDILS 1 AMONG BILLIONS FOUNDATION BANGALORE in 2015 and The Anakru Prashasthi.

His latest work, Samagra Kannada Sahitya Charitre (A Comprehensive History of Kannada Literature) was published in 2014.

== His Works ==
He has authored numerous stories and poetry collections, as well as translated the works of William Shakespeare and T.S. Eliot, among other eminent writers. His oeuvre includes ‘Horalu Dariyalli Kavya’, ‘Nandana’, ‘Chinnada Hakki’, and ‘Horalu Salina Mara’, in addition to his compilation of poems titled ‘Samagra Kavya Samputa - 2’, among others.

== Death ==
Bhatta died on 6 March 2021 in Bengaluru due to age related ailments. He was 84.
