= Shimoga Subbanna =

Indian playback singer (1938–2022)

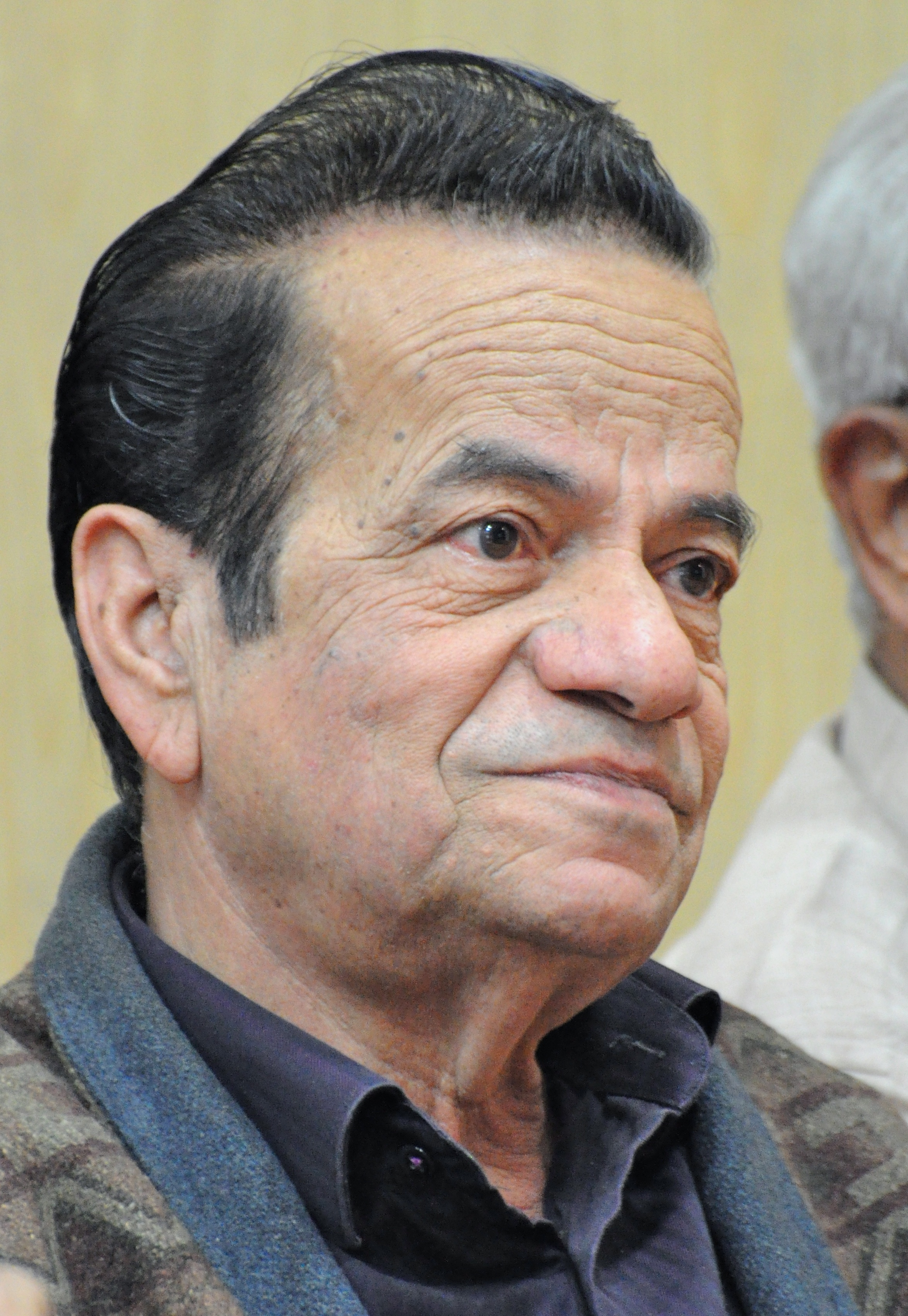
- Shimoga Subbanna in 2012

Background information
- Born: G. Subramanya; 14 December 1938; Nagara, Kingdom of Mysore, British India
- Died: 11 August 2022 (aged 83) Bengaluru, Karnataka, India
- Genres: Carnatic music
- Occupation: Playback singer

Shimoga Subbanna or Shivamogga Subbanna (born as G. Subramanya, 14 December 1938 – 11 August 2022) was an Indian Sugama Sangeetha (Light Music) playback singer in the Kannada language. He received a national award for singing for the song Kaadu Kudure Odi Banditta in the film Kaadu Kudure. He was the first Kannadiga to win National Award for playback singing. Apart from being an exemplary singer and musician, he was also an advocate and a notary public.

== Awards and honors ==
Subbanna received several awards and honors for his contributions to Sugama Sangeetha, some of which are listed below:

- National Film Award for Best Male Playback Singer in 1978
- Sant Shishunal Shariff Award in 2000
- Kannada Kampu award in 2006
- Honorary doctorate from Kuvempu University in 2008
- Sundarashri Award in 2009

== Death ==
He died on 11 August 2022, at the age of 83, after suffering from a cardiac arrest.
