= D. R. Bendre =

Indian English a poet

Dattatreya Ramachandra Bendre
- Born: 31 January 1896; Dharwad, Bombay Presidency, India (now in Karnataka)
- Died: 26 October 1981 (aged 85); Mumbai, Maharashtra, India
- Occupations: Poet; teacher
- Writing career
- Period: 20th century
- Genre: Poetry
- Notable works: Sakheegeeta, Naadaleele, Kannada Meghadoota, Gangaavatarana, Arulu-Maralu, Naaku Tanti
- Notable awards: Sahitya Akademi Award (1958); Padma Shri (1968); Jnanpith Award (1973)
- Movement: Navodaya

Dattātreya Rāmachandra Bēndre (31 January 1896 – 26 October 1981), popularly known as Da Rā Bēndre, is generally considered the greatest Kannada lyric poet of the 20th century and one of the greatest poets in the history of Kannada literature. A pioneering poet of Kannada's Navōdaya movement and a leading figure in the linguistic renaissance of Kannada in the region of North Karnataka (then part of the Bombay Presidency), Bendre forged a new path in Kannada literature and modern Kannada poetry through his original use of desi Kannada, particularly Dharwad Kannada – the form of Kannada spoken in the North Karnataka region of Dharwad. The richness, originality, and euphony of his poetry, his preternatural feel for the Kannada language, and his charismatic personality would result in him being hailed as a Varakavi (lit. 'boon-gifted poet-seer') by the Kannada people. In a poetic journey spanning almost 70 years (~ 1914 – 1981), Bendre engaged continuously in what he called Kāvyōdyōga or 'The High Yoga of Poetry'.

Bust of D. R. Bendre at Dr. Rajkumar Children Park (Jinke Park), Bengaluru (2026)

His library is said to have held books on 102 subjects, including Quantum Physics, Mathematics, and Physiology. From very early on, Bendre published his poetry as Ambikātanayadatta (lit. 'Datta, son of Ambika'). Often mistaken for a pseudonym or pen name (in the western sense), Bendre described Ambikatanayadatta as the "universal inner voice" within him that dictated what he, Bendre, then presented in Kannada to the world.

In 1973, Bendre was awarded the Jnanapitha, India's highest literary award, for his 1964 poetry collection, Naaku Tanti (ನಾಕು ತಂತಿ) (lit. 'Four strings'). Recognized as Karnataka's Kavikula Tilaka ("Crown-jewel among Kannada Poets") by Udupi's Adamaru Matha, he would also be called a Kāvya Gāruḍiga (~ poet-sorcerer) for his ability to create magical poetry. He was awarded the Padma Shri in 1968 and made a fellow of the Sahitya Akademi in 1969.

== Biography ==
=== Early years ===
Dattatreya Ramachandra Bendre was born into a Chitpavan Brahmin family in Dharwad, Karnataka. He was the eldest son of Ramachandrabhatta and Parvatibai (nee Ambavva). The Bendres, also known as Thosars for some time, originally belonged to Kumbaru, a village in the Colaba district of Maharashtra, but a series of migrations which took them to Kalasi, Nasik and Tasgaon where they finally settled down, along with their patrons, the Lagu family in Shirahatti, a town that was formerly part of the princely state of Sangli and is now a part of Gadag district, Karnataka.

Bendre's paternal grandfather, Appashastri (called Appabhatta) (1840–1914), was a Dashagranthi ("Master of ten volumes of sacred lore") who composed several kirtans in Marathi. He was also a Vedic scholar who wrote a treatise on the Arya metre, titled Chhandodaharana. Appabhatta took Sanyasa deeksha in his old age, Later he died in Shirahatti still his Samadhi is in killa oni ( Fort area) of Shirahatti. Bendre's father, Ramachandra Bendre (?–1907), was a Sanskrit scholar who died of scrofula when Bendre was only 12 years old. Bendre's mother Parvatibai (name before marriage was Ambavva), who died in 1924, was Ramachandra Bendre's second wife. She was the youngest child of her mother, Godubai.

Bendre's maternal grandmother, Godubai, was related to the Dixit family of Naragund on her father's side and the Natu family of Mulagund on her husband's side. Extraordinarily strong-willed, she confronted being cast out by her in-laws following her husband's death (in 1887–88) by moving, on her own, to Dharwad with her newborn child (Bendre's mother, Ambavva) and her two older daughters. Over there, she set up a khanavali (eatery) to support herself and her three daughters. Later in life, given her son-in-law Ramachandra Bendre's ill-health and early death, she became a substantial provider (along with Ramachandra Bendre's brother) for her daughter's family of four sons also. Consequently, Bendre would grow up under the aegis of his mother and grandmother. In his autobiographical essay titled 'The High Yoga of Poetry', Bendre says that "deprived by fate of my father's and his family's closeness, it was by direct observance of my mother's and grandmother's conduct that I realised my manhood." In a poem he wrote in his seventies, Bendre would pay tribute to Godubai's courage by remembering her as someone who has "fed him [on] tiger's milk".

The oldest of four boys, Bendre completed his primary and high school education in Dharwad. Matriculating in 1913, he joined Fergusson College, Pune, and graduated in 1918 with a BA in Sanskrit and English. While in Pune, he lived with Bandopant Bendre, his father's younger brother. With no children of his own, Bandopant would, until the end of his life, act as a great support to his older brother's wife and children. Upon finishing his BA, Bendre returned immediately to Dharwad, where he became a teacher at the Victoria High School, thereby transforming into "Bendre Maastaru" (ಬೇಂದ್ರೆ ಮಾಸ್ತರ), a title he held for the rest of his life.

=== College years ===
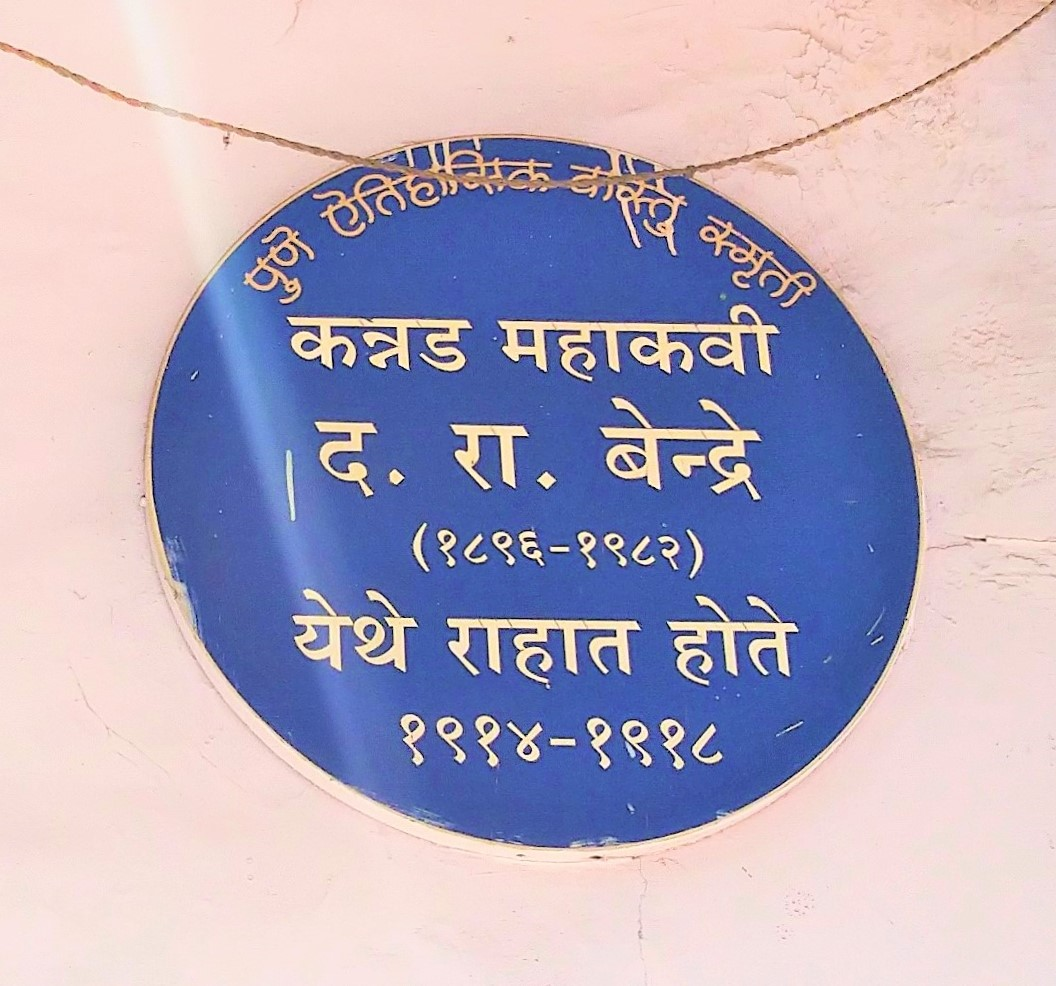
Blue plaque in Marathi at D. R. Bendre's residence in Pune where he lived from 1914 to 1918.

Bendre left for Pune in 1913 to attend Fergusson College. Joining him was Shridhar Khanolkar, a classmate from his very first day of primary school. A poet himself, Khanolkar too would return to Dharwad after his BA and work alongside Bendre at Victoria High School. Bendre would "with affection" dedicate his 1938 poetry collection ಉಯ್ಯಾಲೆ (Uyyaale) to Khanolkar's friendship and encouragement and their warm relationship would last until Khanolkar's death in 1965.

During his years in Pune, Bendre came in contact with Professor B. V. Patwardhan. Patwardhan had taught at the Basel Mission High School in Dharwad and was an influential person in Pune's literary circles. Through Patwardhan's cousin, K. R. Paranjape, Bendre would come to know Ram Ganesh Gadkari (Govindagraja), a pioneering poet of modern Marathi literature. While in college, Bendre would also become very involved in the 'Sharada Mandal', a group built by Prabhakar Hari Khadlikar and his friends. The Mandal was dedicated to the promotion of national identity and the mother tongue. This 'Sharada Mandal' would serve as a model for (and sow the seed of) the famous "ಗೆಳೆಯರ ಗುಂಪು (Geleyara Gumpu)", the "literary circle" that Bendre would put together in the years following his return to Dharwad.

=== Young Poet ===
Bendre's first published poem was "Tutoori" (Trumpet). This poem was probably inspired by the Marathi poet's Keshavasuta's "Tutaari" – but there are important differences between the two. Bendre's poem is a lot shorter and lacks the revolutionary ardour of Keshavasuta's poem. It is possible that Bendre felt a kinship with Keshavasuta based on their common admiration for Keats. Govindagraja too might have exercised an influence on Bendre: the similarity in theme between 'Raatrige (To the Night) and 'Manatali Divasa Ratra' makes this a plausible supposition. However, in the total context of Bendre's poetry, the influence of modern Marathi poetry is limited. Bendre himself was of the opinion that the influence of Marathi poetry on modern Kannada poetry was negligible. Indeed, Bendre had his own views about "influence". In his opinion, "it is not imitation of theme or style that elevates a poet or his poetry. [He] must constantly meditate on the lives of great souls". Drawn deeply to Sri Aurobindo's idea of 'Fourfold Beauty', Bendre would come to see the world and the universe in terms of the number four. (His naming his poetry collection Four Strings is evidence of this.) This "idea of four" included what Bendre called his "guruchatururmukha" or "the four faces of the guru". For Bendre, these four gurus were the Irish mystic and poet, A.E., the Lebanese poet-philosopher, Khalil Gibran, "Gurudeva" Rabindranath Tagore, and the Indian revolutionary and seer, Sri Aurobindo. According to Bendre, A.E. showed him a new way of experiencing nature while Gibran deepened his awareness of the metaphorical depth of the avatara concept. Tagore, who was an earlier and much wider influence than either A.E. or Gibran, helped Bendre develop a strong sense of community besides "teaching [him] to love [his] mother" through the exquisite poems of 'The Crescent Moon' collection. In an early poem of praise titled "Gurudeva", Bendre calls Tagore 'the world's eye'. But Sri Aurobindo's was the greatest and longest-lasting influence. In his early years, his introduction to Sri Aurobindo was through the articles in "Arya" regarding "The Future Poetry". These articles would inspire Bendre to work towards the creation of a mantra-like poetry himself. In later years, his visit to the Pondicherry Ashram for a darshana of Sri Aurobindo and The Mother would make a profound impression and influence the trajectory of his post-1956 poetry.

=== Public Recognition, Publication, and Elevation to "Varakavi" Status ===
Unlike poets like Tagore and Yeats and certainly unlike Keats, Shelley, and Rimbaud, Bendre's recognition as a poet came rather late, when he was in his early 30s. Though he began writing poetry in his late teens, published his first poem when he was twenty, and his first book (titled Krishṇakumaari, a mid-length narrative poem) came out in 1922, it was only after the public reading of his poem "Hakki Haarutide Nodidiraa" at the Belagavi Sahitya Sammelana in 1929 that he became famous, almost overnight. Like Masti Venkatesh Iyengar would say later, "...it is impossible now to describe the ecstasy [the poem's] listeners felt that day. [While] that one reading was hardly sufficient to understand the various meanings the poem suggested, it was enough to astonish the thousand-strong audience. It was clear to everyone of standing in the "poetry world" that here was a new poet whose poetic shakti (~power) was his very own." This performance would be followed by the release of Bendre's poetry collection Gari in 1932. Like Shankar Mokashi Punekar says in his wonderful essay about Bendre's poetry, to read the poems in the Gari collection is to see "how much further along Bendre has cartwheeled in the ten years since [the publication of] Krishṇakumaari".

This profound change in Bendre's poetry was not lost on critics. Despite their unfamiliarity with the Dharwad dialect that Bendre had used in Gari (and which he would soon come to master completely), critics like V. Seetharamaiah and Ti. Nam. Sri praised the collection, with Ti. Nam. Sri even going so far as to say that some poems in it were "deserving of a place in world literature". The publication of Gari would cause the floodgates to open, as it were, and the river of lyric poetry that rushed forth – in the form of the collections Moorthi mattu Kaamakastoori (1934), Sakheegeeta (1937), Uyyaale (1938), and Naadaleele (1938) – would overwhelm the Kannada literary world with its newness, innovation, and originality. At the same time, it would appeal to the common people through its inherent naada (~ euphony) and musicality. Writing the foreword to Naadaleele, Masti, whose keen critical sense had taken note of Bendre's work as early as 1926 and been stirred to actively support it after the Belagavi performance of 1929, would note that Bendre's poetry "[is] not simply promising but [has] achieved fulfillment".

In an essay written examining Bendre's "poetics", Shankar Mokashi offers an excellent presentation of the idea of a varakavi. He says, "...[t]his is an important description of an important experience! The simultaneous blossoming of [the] necessary words and rhyme with the blossoming of an idea [in the poet's mind] is the experience of very very few poets. ... But that this is part of creation in poetry is evidenced by the poetry of Valmiki, Shelley and supported by the theory of "expressionism" put forth by the Italian philosopher, Croce. We can also look to understand this [inner experience] through a number of Bendre's poems and the experience of other poets. Basically, what we are saying is that no sooner does a feeling and a word enter the poet's mind than a rhyme, a rhythm, and a euphony descend simultaneously. ... This is a very piquant matter. This experience is at the root of the distinction made between the narakavi and the varakavi (the earthbound-poet and the heaven-touched poet) in our ancient poetics. In a varakavi, feeling-euphony-word descend in effortless simultaneity and take on form singly-doubly-triply."

=== The Evolution of Bendre's Poetry ===
According to G.S Amur, the evolution of Bendre's poetry can be seen as having happened over three phases. Amur calls the first phase the "early experimental phase" and avers that it spanned from about 1917 to 1923. The second phase is what he calls "the first flowering", which began in 1923 and continued until 1956. The third phase, per Amur, began in 1956 and lasted until Bendre's death in 1981. Amur calls this phase "the second flowering". Given Bendre's voracious interest in everything under the sun, it is not surprising that these phases present themselves as a mix of continuity and change.

The elements of growth and change in Bendre's poetry can be seen understood in terms of theme, form, and imagery. The early phase, despite being one of experimentation, nonetheless referenced several of Bendre's central poetic concerns and can be thought of as having laid the ground for the poetry that was to come. For instance, there is an "aspirational" quality to the poems of this phase: several poems are suffused with an idealism that desires a regional and national awakening as well as a poetic inspiration. The form and language of Bendre's earliest poems (including Krishṇakumaari) are reasonably conventional. However, the poems of Gari show the first signs of Bendre's experiments with Dharwad's "earthy" vulgate as well as his preoccupation with naada or euphony. The themes that dominate the poetry of this first flowering are too varied to count and span the human experience. Nothing is excluded; all life is a leele (divine play) in which "nothing is fruitless". Or, as Mokashi Punekar says, Bendre "was a true bhaavageetakaara (lyric poem creator)" – in the sense that everything was 'material' for a bhaavageeta or a lyric poem. This phase involved endless experimentation and resulted in some of the finest lyric poetry produced in modern Kannada literature. The poetry of the final phase may be called "the visionary phase". In this phase, we see Bendre looking to explore the roots of language (or vak) and its four degrees (or manifestations) as described in Indic poetics – vaikari, madhyama, pashyanti, and parā – and to create new poetic forms capable of articulating his vision. In a bid to achieve the quality of the mantra, Bendre experimented with a variety of metres including Vedic metres.

=== Ambikatanayadatta ===
The phenomenon of Ambikatanayadatta is an especially interesting one, but one that has been seldom discussed in critical appraisals regarding Bendre and his poetry. In his autobiographical essay, Bendre says that " this name [Ambikatanayadatta] is not some sobriquet meant to conceal the name 'Bendre'. In a poem with that name, you can find clues that illuminate [the phenomenon's] piquancy. Right by this poem's side is the poem 'ನಾನು (I)'." Like the last two lines of the poem "ನಾನು (I)" say: ""The Nārayaṇa of the lotus-heart has himself turned into the mortal Datta / as Ambikātanaya he mirrors in Kannada the universe's inner voice." Bendre's mother's name was Ambika (known affectionately as Ambavva) and "Ambika_tanaya_datta" means "Datta, Son of Ambika".

Perhaps the only critic who has seriously attempted to understand the phenomenon of Ambikatanayadatta is Shankar Mokashi Punekar. In one of his essays following Bendre's death, he writes: "Has Bendre gone heavenwards? Yes. But it is impossible for 'Ambikatanayadatta' to ever leave this earth, this language, this town of Sadhanakeri. To paraphrase Bendre, his poems are living and breathing examples of recipients of the 'Ambikatanayadatta' touch. Occasionally, this touch used to happen in [Bendre's] dreams. In his poems, [Bendre] has put such lines [that came to him in dreams] within quotation marks. Once in a while, when a couple of stanzas came after much effort, the 'Ambikatanayadatta' that flashed [within] would come and, relieving Bendre of his burden, move forward with sure-footed swiftness." In the concluding part of the same essay, Punekar says that "Bendre's mother tongue was Marathi. However, his Marathi poems do not even "reach the knee-height" of his Kannada poems. But the Marathi people must not consider these words an 'insult'. [Because] while Bendre's mother tongue was Marathi, Ambikatanayadatta's mother tongue was Kannada. He was a Kannadiga. [This cannot be explained] Only those who get what I mean will get it."

Punekar's description fits well with Bendre's own estimation of Ambikatanayadatta and his conviction that it was "the universal inner voice" within him. For example, in his foreword to Gari, his very first collection of poems, he says: "I have talked so far of my poems. This is simply a matter of habit. In truth these are not my poems; they are Kannada's poems. The Kannada-language's incorporeal voice is actualizing itself through a thousand throats. That my throat is one among this thousand is itself my blessing. That I am one among the group of poets singing in the dawn of Kannada's renaissance is itself my source of pride. For if it were not so, why should anybody care about my poems? To say 'my poems' or 'his poems' is fallacious; for Kannada to lay claim to these poems is the truth." Later, many years after he had earned the varakavi honorific and was secure in his position as the doyen of modern Kannada poetry, he would say in the foreword to Naaku Tanti: "...to all those sahrudayas who have continued to welcome the poems of 'Ambikatanayadatta,' 'Bendre' conveys his gratitude: that his scribesmanship is not simply a waste, that his happy, wanton singing is not completely fruitless." In addition to these writings, stories of Bendre going up on stage and conveying "Bendre's salutations to the great poet Ambikatanayadatta" are also in circulation.

=== Marriage and Family life ===
Bendre married Lakshmibai (nee Rangoobai) (1906–1966) in 1919 in Ranebennuru. He was 23 at the time and Lakshmibai was 13. They would go on to have nine children and stay married for 47 years until Lakshmibai's death in 1966.

To Bendre, marriage was its own form of sadhana. With Bendre unemployed for long durations between 1924 and 1942, the burden of managing the family and finances fell on Lakshmibai who bore them stoically. The primary reason for this "jangama life", as Bendre called it, was his imprisonment (in 1932) by the British government on charges of sedition. The excuse given was that his poem "Narabali" (Human Sacrifice) was a poem that could possibly incite violence. Despite having to stay in jail for only three months (and having to spend another nine months under house arrest), the British government's injunction that "nobody [was] allowed to employ Bendre for up to eight years after his release" meant giving up the hope of any permanent job during that period. All these misfortunes meant that Lakshmibai was taxed with keeping the family fed and clothed on the little money that Bendre was able to bring home. It is worth mentioning that Masti was a great help to Bendre in these years, both as a friend and financially. He appointed Bendre the (unofficial) editor of his magazine, Jeevana, and paid him a monthly sum to help him tide through those years. Bendre would always remain grateful for Masti's generosity and come to think of and refer to him as aṇṇa (big brother).

Although she had been educated only up to the fourth grade, Bendre involved Lakshmibai in his poetry and she was always the first one to listen to Bendre's poems. In 1937, Bendre wrote his famous Sakheegeeta, a descriptive account of his married life up to that point. In it, he refers to his wife Lakshmibai as his sakhee, a first in Kannada literature (and possibly Indian literature). In the foreword to the poem, Bendre says that he has "let spread the happy-sad vine of the ordinary married life upon the trellis of [his] personal experience." Written in a metre of his own invention, the poem is especially striking for its (rooted) universality and for its prolific use of non-Sanskritized Kannada.

The Bendres' married life was a difficult one. They were unfortunate enough to lose six of their nine children. One of them, Ramachandra, a budding poet himself, died of an infection at 20, on the cusp of manhood and just when he was beginning to be the dependable support his parents were looking for. The elegy Bendre composed for Rama (as he was known) is considered one of the greatest poems of its kind in Kannada. Another poem, "ನೀ ಹೀಂಗ ನೋಡಬ್ಯಾಡ ನನ್ನ (Don't Look at Me This Way)", written as a lament at the loss of his daughter Lalitha, is one of 20th-century Kannada literature's most popular as well as critically acclaimed song-poems.

Lakshmibai's constitution was not strong and she suffered periodically from illnesses. According to her younger son (of the two who survived), Dr. Vamana Bendre, the loss of Ramachandra plunged her into a despondence she was never quite able to overcome. With Bendre's job never being well-paying, Lakshmibai stoically endured a life of hardship. Her memory, though, has been immortalized in a number of Bendre's 'love poems'. In an especially touching gesture, Bendre dedicated his dazzling Kannada translation of Kalidasa's Meghadoota to Lakshmibai, calling her his "Lakshmi of good fortune" and asking that she "accept this garland made of pearls picked from Kalidasa's sea" and "become a partner in his prosperity".

In some ways, despite the western cultural mores that underpin the statement, it would not be wrong to say that Bendre, through his art, brought to life Eliot's assertion that ''the more perfect the artist, the more completely separate in him will be the man who suffers and the mind which creates; the more perfectly will the mind digest and transmute the passions which are its material". There is no doubt that while Bendre the man suffered, the creative mind (Ambikatanayadatta?) digested and transmuted Bendre's suffering into some of the finest lyric poetry in modern Kannada. Or to say it using Bendre's own words, "rasika, let my troubles stay my own / I will give you just their song! / And if that melts your sugar-heart / send drops of sweetness back along!"

Lakshmibai finally died on 17 August 1966, after another illness. Deeply saddened by Lakshmibai's death (at a time when things were finally beginning to look up financially), Bendre found solace in the company of Swami Nityananda of Vajreshvari. He would, some years later, address his departed sakhee in his Matte Shravana Bantu collection (1973), where he returned to the metre of Sakheegeeta to narrate the story of his boyhood and youth up until he married his sakhee.

Dr. Vamana Bendre (1935–2017), Panduranga Bendre (1929–2004), and Mangala (b. 1939) were the only children of Bendre's who lived to be adults. Upon Bendre's death in 1981, Dr. Vamana Bendre took over as his 'literary executor' and edited the 18-volume Audumbaragaathe, a compilation of all of Bendre's poetry and prose writings. With his siblings Panduranga Bendre and Mangala and his colleague K.S. Sharma, Dr. Vamana Bendre was also responsible for the creation of the Ambikatanayadatta Vedike, a platform to promote Bendre's work. With the help of a grant from the Karnataka government, a portion of Bendre's 'Shrimaata' home was used to build the 'Bendre Bhavana' as a memorial to the Ambikatanayadatta, the poet.

=== Bendre and Dharwad ===
According to Bendre himself, his relationship with Dharwad was an umbilical one. His affection for Dharwad and its people and the inspiration he drew from it has been compared to the inspiration Lake District provided Wordsworth. Closer home, it has been compared to the Adikavi Pampa's affection for his beloved Banavasi (which, says Pampa in one verse, he wishes to be reborn in, if only as a little bee.) With his firm belief in the "mother principle", Bendre would address the land of Dharwad as Dharawada taayi or 'Mother Dharawada' and ask her, when he had to go away for a period on work, to await his coming like she would her child's. Having grown up in different homes in Dharwad, he would settle in a house (gifted to him by his uncle, Bandopant Bendre) in the Sadhanakeri area of Dharwad and make the area famous through his famous song-poem "Baaro Saadhanakerige".

Here is an account by Keerthinath Kurtakoti, who along with Shankar Mokashi and G.S Amur is considered one of the three finest critics of Bendre's poetry, of Bendre's relationship with Dharwad and its people. "It was when I was ... filming a documentary of Bendre that this idea of the relationship Bendre had with Dharwad struck me of a sudden. [That is] the style of Dharwad's development is the style of Bendre's poetry. Dharwad's culture is a mixture of folk-culture and city-culture. Bendre had once heard someone say that Dharwad's natural beauty – in particular, its rains and its lush greenness – was capable of making anybody who lived there a poet. In the foreword he wrote to Chennaveera Kanavi's Nela-Mugilu poetry collection, Bendre would answer this by saying that "despite Dandeli's thick forests having more rain and greenness than Dharwad, not a single poet has come out of the region". Now it might seem astonishing that a poet who has immortalized Dharwad's scenic beauty in his poetry has such little faith in the inspiring power of the region's natural beauty. But it is only the Dharwad people's "divine vigour" that Bendre has faith in. He has, with his own eyes, seen how Dharwad has put back and rebuilt the Kannada [language and culture] that at the beginning of this century was lying waste. He has himself participated in this rebuilding." ... Every inch of the Dharwad land has revealed its history to Bendre. For him, both the classical and the modern have to present themselves through Dharwad [alone]."

=== Post-retirement years, old age, and death ===
Upon his retirement from D.A.V College, Solapur, in 1956, Bendre returned to Sadhanakeri. Fortunately for him, no sooner did he return than he was made the adviser to the Dharwad branch of Akashvani. This was, in large part, thanks to the generosity and foresight of P.M. Lad, the then Secretary to the Government of India in the Ministry of Information and Broadcasting. During his stint there, Bendre wrote a great deal for A.I.R, including a number of radio plays, of which only a few have been published so far. Meanwhile, his association with a publisher friend, Bhalachandra Ghanekar, led to the publication of five new books of poetry. These books were soon combined into a single-volume and published in 1957 under the title Aralu-Maralu. The collection would win the Sahitya Academy award in 1958.

In 1965, Bendre, who also wrote poetry and prose in Marathi, received the Kelkar Prize for Samvada, a selection of his Marathi prose writing. In 1966, Bendre turned 70. The event was marked by a grand celebration in Shirahatti, his ancestral hometown.

This period also saw Bendre receive with a number of well-deserved honours. The University of Mysore gave him an Honorary Doctorate in 1966 and Karnatak University followed suit in 1968. 1968 was also the year that he received the Padma Shri from the Government of India. Elected a Fellow of the Sahitya Akademi in 1969, he was awarded India's highest literary award, the Jnanapitha, in 1974. Kashi Vidyapitha presented him with his third Honorary Doctorate in 1976.

Through all of this, Bendre's 'High Yoga of Poetry' brought out eleven collections of poetry between 1957 and 1978.

Towards the end of his life, Bendre became deeply absorbed in numbers. Interested from early on itself in numbers and their representation, the theory of Sankhya, and the Katapayadi system, they now became his central concern. In fact, he was known to waylay hapless travellers and hold forth for hours about this or that new idea regarding numbers that had come to him. When Dom Moraes visited Bendre in 1976, he found him completely immersed in numbers. He was still a Gārudiga, but the Gārudi had been replaced by a calculator. "Only great poets", wrote Moraes, "have such interests and ideas as Dr. Bendre."

Bendre died in Mumbai's Harkishandas hospital on 26 October 1981, aged 85. He was cremated that very evening in accordance with Hinduism's last rites. His ashes were later taken to Dharwad where a procession gathered to mourn and celebrate Karnataka's and Dharwad's favourite poet.

== Critical reception, influence, and legacy ==
Bendre is widely recognized the greatest and most influential Kannada poet of the 20th century, by his peers of the Navodaya period, younger contemporaries, and the later poets of the Navya, Bandaya, Dalit, and other movements. While he has been criticized by some for the lack of "social concern" in his poetry and others have called the poetry of the post-Naaku Tanti period incomprehensible and "meaningless wordplay", there is near-unanimous agreement about the originality and inventiveness of his poetry, his position as the trailblazer of modern Kannada poetry, and his remarkable use of the Kannada language. The well-known critic, L. S. Seshagiri Rao, has written that it is "doubtful that anybody in Kannada's literary history has explored the Kannada language as comprehensively as Bendre". In an essay written a few years before Bendre's death, Gopalkrishna Adiga, often called the leader of Kannada's Navya movement, would say that, "After Pampa and Naranappa, nobody has grasped the very quick of the Kannada language and, strumming the language's life-chord itself, written poetry the way [our] Bendre has." He would add in the same essay that, no matter what differences of opinion one might have with Bendre, "he is the guru of every poet writing [in Kannada] now. ... There is no poet who has not, either directly or indirectly, come within the sphere of his influence. That he showed the way [forward] not just to imitators but to poets possessed of great talent themselves or that he nourished their poetry [with his own] is a matter of importance. Bendre is the most important poet-creator of this century. Every poet writing now is a child, grandchild, or great-grandchild of Bendre's poetry. ... Not only has Bendre's poetry become a part of our culture, it has become one with our essence."

V. K. Gokak, a younger contemporary of Bendre's, one of the members of Bendre's "Geleyara Gumpu", and himself a Jnanapitha awardee, confesses in his book, Bendre: Poet and Seer, that it was Bendre's acquaintance that ensured "[Gokak's] muse did not perish in the deserts of Indo-Anglian verse" and goes on to say that "Bendre's poetry has ushered in a tradition of its own in modern Kannada literature ... [his] poetic style has an intricate pattern of its own ... [his] is an epic style harnessed to [sic] lyric uses ... every great modern writer illustrates [the synthesis of India and Europe, ancient and modern culture, science and art] in his own way ... and this is what Bendre does [which puts him] among the best writers that the modern world has produced."

Interestingly, Bendre's poetry was responsible for the critical development of three of Kannada's best-known thinkers, viz. Keertinath Kurtakoti, Shankar Mokashi, and G.S Amur. Each of these younger-by-a-generation contemporaries of his used his poetry as the whetstone to sharpen their critical acumen on. In doing so, each of them made a notable contribution to modern Kannada criticism. In particular, their insights about Bendre include Mokashi's statement that "of those [Kannada] poets to whose study one may capably and successfully devote a whole lifetime, Shri Bendre is the most modern ... his is a poetry that may be thought of as 'out-topping knowledge'".

Meanwhile, G.S Amur writes in his Sahitya Akademi award-winning book, Bhuvanada Bhaagya, that "no matter what criteria we use to measure Bendre's poetry – vision, richness of language, the ability to create images, the successful use of metre, the variety of poetic style, it is evident that his poetry stands shoulder to shoulder with the poetry of any epic poet who has [ever] lived." In the book he wrote for the Sahitya Akademi, Amur concludes by saying that "the bhaavageeta was [Bendre's] chief mode of expression but in his hands it assumed many forms, from a folk lyric to Mantra [sic] and expressed itself in a variety of a rhythms and an amazing range of symbolic imagery. He was undoubtedly the greatest lyrical poetic genius of the century."

Written as early as 1962, Kurtakoti's essay, on the other hand, offers us an understanding of the influence that Bendre's poetry would have on 20th century Kannada poetry and beyond. Kurtakoti says that "from every point of view, Bendre is the leading poet of the age. Later critics can discuss the merits of Bendre's own poetry and the style of its beauty in more detail. For the time being, all we can is this: that Bendre's poetry is rich in a way that does justice to the Kannada language's natural rhythms, to the present-day's sensibilities, and to the inner-essence of the Kannada literary tradition. In this fashion, his Kannada poetic creation has given new life to the Kannada poetic tradition. When Bendre first began to write poetry, there was nothing before him [to model his poetry on]. But the poets of the future will have Bendre's poetry [to refer to] ... this alone tells us clearly of the importance of Bendre's poetry."

Bendre himself was not unaware of the depth, range, and brilliance of his poetry. In his foreword to Naaku Tanti, he speaks about "the poetry of wordly effort and the poetry of yogic effort" and says that "we must not by holding on tight to the ignorance and egotism of ordinariness give it up to the curse of petrification" before adding that "complexity and incomprehension are the result of one's natural sensibilities. It is only through comprehensive learning that old bonds can be shaken off, and new relationships created." In another essay of his, he says "The process of understanding literature is a living, breathing process. It may take centuries even. Understanding me is left to the future". Having said this, he quotes Bhavabhuti's famous "time is endless and the world is large" statement in the foreword to his 1972 collection Vinaya and goes on to say that the statement is the maxim a poet has to live by until his readers garner the necessary "cultural capital" that is needed to understand his work. "A critical examination of the work of a born poet can only be done by a born [literary] critic."

Bendre's legacy as a popular poet remains secure, mostly on account of the immense popularity of Kannada's bhaavageete tradition and his play with the Kannada language's sound. His poetry, including his post-Naaku Tanti work, also continues to attract new writers and critics. Like Shankar Mokashi once said of Ambikatanayadatta, "[he] will live on forever in Shri Bendre's work. He will remain a favoured son of the world. As Shri Bendre himself once said about poetry: 'Oh vision seen by the men of god!' To have known such a man of god is our good fortune; to attempt to understand him is futile: like Gommata, 'ಅತ್ಯತಿಷ್ಠತ್ ದಶಾಂಗುಲಂ' (अत्यतिष्ठत् दशाङ्गुलं) – he stands ten angulas above us all."

== In popular culture ==
In 1972, film director and playwright Girish Karnad directed a Kannada documentary film, Da Ra Bendre, for the Government of Karnataka. The script was written by Keertinath Kurtakoti. Bendre is also the primary character of the semi-fictional novel Dharawadada Dattu Master by N. K. Kulkarni.

== Awards and honours ==
- President of the 27th Kannada Sahitya Sammelana (held in Shimoga in 1943)
- Sahitya Academy award – 1958
- Kelkar Prize – 1965
- Padma Shri award – 1968
- Fellowship of the Sahitya Academy – 1968
- Jnanpitha Award – 1973 (For the collection of poems Naaku Tanti)

== Bibliography ==
Poetry collections

- Krishṇakumaari (1922)
- Gari (1932)
- Moorthi mattu Kaamakastoori (1934)
- Sakheegeeta (1937)
- Uyyaale (1938)
- Naadaleele (1938)
- Meghadoota (1943))
- Haaḍu Paaḍu (1946)
- Gangaavataraṇa (1951)
- Sooryapaana (1956)
- Hrudaya Samudra (1956)
- Muktakanṭha (1956)
- Chaityaalaya (1957)
- Jeevalahari (1957)
- Araḷu Maraḷu (1957)
- Namana (1958)
- Sanchaya (1959)
- Uttaraayaṇa (1960)
- Mugila Mallige (1961)
- YakshaYakshi (1962)
- Naaku Tanti (1964)
- Maryaade (1966)
- Shrimaata (1968)
- Idu Nabhōvaaṇi (1970)
- Matte Shraavaṇa Bantu (1973)
- Chaturōkti (1978)
- Paraaki (1982)
- Kavyavaikhari (1982)
- Taa Lekkaniki Taa Dauti (1983)
- Baalabodhe (1983)
- Pratibimbagaḷu (1987)
- Shatamaana (1990)
- Bhoo Daivategaḷu

Plays

- Tirukara Pidugu (1930)
- Uddhaara (1930)
- Nageya Hoge (1931)
- Hucchataagalu (1935)
- Hosa Samsara mattu Itara Ekaankagalu (1950)
- Ambikatanayadatta Nataka Samputa (1982)

Story collections

- Niraabharanasundari (1940)

Works of Criticism

- Saahitya mattu Vimarshe (1937)
- Saahityasamshodhana (1940)
- Vichaaramanjari (1945)
- Kavi Lakshmishana Jaimini Bhaaratakke Munnudi (1954)
- Maharashtra Saahitya (1959)
- Kannada Saahityadalli Naalku Nayakaratnagalu (1968)
- Maatella Jyotu (1972)
- Saahityada Viratsvaroopa (1974)
- Kumaaravyasa (1979)
- Matadharma mattu Aadhunika Maanava (1979)

Edited works

- Nannadu Ee Kannada Nadu (1928)
- Hakki Haaruthide (1930)
- Chandrahaasa (1948)
- Hosagannada Kaavyashree (1957)
- Kanakadasa Chaturshatamaanotsava Samsmarana – Samputa (1965)

Translations

- Vittala Sampradaaya (1984)
- Hosagannada Kaavyashree (1957)
- Shantala (1972)
- Upanishadrahasya, by R.D. Ranade (1923)
- Bhaaratiya Navajanma (1936, "The Indian Renaissance" by Sri Aurobindo)
- Sri Aravindara Yoga Ashrama mattu Tatvopadesha (1947)
- Kabira Vachanaavali (1968)
- Bhagnamoorthi (1972)
- Guru Govindasingh
- Noorondu Kavanagalu (from Tagore's poems ed. by Humayun Kabir)

Works in other languages

- A Theory of Immortality (1977)

== See also ==
Kuvempu

D. V. Gundappa
