= Mysore Ananthaswamy =

- Born: 25 October 1936
- Died: January 9, 1995 (aged 58) Bengaluru
- Genres: Sugama Sangeetha
- Occupations: Singer, Music composer
- Instruments: Harmonium, Mandolin

Mysore Ananthaswamy was one of the pioneers of Kannada Bhavageethe in Karnataka. He was a very popular composer and singer of Kannada Sugama Sangeetha. He composed music for several poems and bhavageethe written by well-known Kannada poets like Kuvempu, K. S. Nissar Ahmed, N S Lakshminarayana Bhatta and others. Some of his songs includes 'Jogada Siri Belakinali', Jaya Bharata Jananiya Tanujate, O Nanna Chetana, Tanuvu Ninnade Manavu Ninnade, Ede Tumbi Haadidenu etc....
At a young age, Ananthaswamy played Mandolin that he purchased for 25 rupees. Later, he switched to Harmonium due to difficulty in fine tuning the Mandolin.

Ananthaswamy composed music to the state anthem of Karnataka, Jaya Bharata Jananiya Tanujate in 1960. He once sang his composition in front of Kuvempu who is the writer of the anthem at Maharaja College in Mysore. A note in Ananthaswamy's diary says Kuvempu was delighted by his tune and approved his tune, adding a suggestion that it should be sung in a group. Several committees have recommended the tune composed by Ananthaswamy to be recognized as the official tune of the Karnataka state anthem.

== Discography ==
This is a partial list of notable compositions by Mysore Ananthaswamy

- Jaya Bharata Jananiya Tanujate
- Jogada Siri Belakinali
- Ede Tumbi Haadidenu
- O Nanna Chetana

== Awards and honors ==
He was awarded with Karnataka Sangeeta Nritya Academy award and Rajyotsava Award.

== Death ==
Mysore Ananthaswamy died of cancer on 9 January 1995 in Bengaluru. He was survived by his Wife Shanta Ananthaswamy, son Raju Ananthaswamy and three daughters.

== See also ==
- Kuvempu
- K S Narasimha Swamy
- K. S. Nisar Ahamed
- H. S. Venkateshamurthy
- Raju Ananthaswamy
