= Shashidhar Adapa =

Indian production designer (born 1955)

Shashidhara MG
- Born: Shashidhar Adapa B. 1 September 1955 (age 71); Mangalore, Mysore State, India
- Occupations: Production designer Set designer Proprietor of Prathiroopi

Shashidhar Adapa (born 1 September 1955) is an Indian production designer, set designer and puppet designer, known predominantly for his work in Kannada cinema. In 1984, he formed Prathiroopi, a television, film, and stage set design company.

In his career spanning over 30 years, Adapa has worked with theatre personalities such as B. V. Karanth, Shankar Nag, M. S. Sathyu, C. G. Krishnaswamy, B. Jayashree, Prakash Belawadi, and filmmakers T. S. Nagabharana, Girish Karnad, Girish Kasaravalli, T. N. Seetharam, Mani Ratnam and Yogaraj Bhat. He has worked in over 45 Kannada films, in addition to Tamil, Hindi and French films. He is a four-time recipient of Karnataka State Film Award for Best Art Direction and in 2004, was awarded the Chaman Lal Memorial Award for his "outstanding contribution to stagecraft".

== Career ==
Adapa began his career in the early 1980s as a set designer for stage plays. In 1984, he founded 'Prathiroopi', an outfit that has since, designed production sets for theatre, television soaps, films and stage events predominantly mainly in Karnataka.

Adapa also had led teams of artistes in major events that feature showcasing the art, culture and history of Karnataka. It involved designing the sets that hosted the annual Hampi Utsav, in the Hampi region of Karnataka.

=== Republic Day tableaux ===
Adapa led the team that designed Karnataka's tableau vivant at India's Republic Day parade, in 2015. The tableau of the famed toys of Channapatna were showcased. It was fabricated on a multi-layered platform fitted on a tractor trailer. A total of 42 toys including 30 giant sized ones and four fitted with battery for rotation formed part of the tableau. For 2016, he designed a tableau on the theme of Kodagu district, the country's major coffee producing region, depicting the various stages of coffee-making, from harvest to filter coffee. For 2017, he led a team that designed a tableau based on the folklore theme, showcasing five major arts — dance of the Goravas, Veeragase, Kamsale, Dollu Kunitha and Somana Kunita

=== Films ===
Having worked in films since the 1980s, Adapa is a frequent collaborator of filmmakers T. S. Nagabharana, Girish Kasaravalli, T. N. Seetharam. His work in Kannada films include Sankranthi (1989), Chinnari Mutha (1993), Nagamandala (1997), Kanooru Heggadithi (1999), Deveeri (1999), Singaaravva (2003), Gaalipata (2008) and Kendasampige (2015). His work in Hindi and Tamil films include Talaash: The Answer Lies Within (2012) and Kadal (2013). He has also worked in French films Passeur d'enfants à Pondichéry (2000) and Hypochondriac.

== Filmography ==
=== Kannada ===
- Sankranthi (1989)
- Santha Shishunala Sharifa (1990)
- Bhujangayyana Dashavathara (1991)
- Chinnari Mutha (1993)
- Chukki Chandrama (1993)
- Kotreshi Kanasu (1994)
- Nagamandala (1997)
- Kanooru Heggadithi (1999)
- Deveeri (1999)
- Singaaravva (2003)
- Mani (2003)
- Thutturi (2006)
- Aa Dinagalu (2007)
- Gaalipata (2008)
- Nooru Janmaku (2010)
- Thamassu (2010)
- Pancharangi (2010)
- Jackie (2010)
- Aidondla Aidu (2011)
- Koormavatara (2013)
- Kaddipudi (2013)
- Kendasampige (2015)
- Parapancha (2015)
- Doddmane Hudga (2016)
- Idolle Ramayana (2016)
- Allama (2017)
- Uppina Kagada (2017)
- Yajamana (2019)

=== Hindi ===
- Agni Varsha (2002)
- Bas Yun Hi (2003)
- Freaky Chakra (2003)
- Ek Alag Mausam (2003)
- Talaash: The Answer Lies Within (2012)

=== Tamil ===
- Kadal (2013)

=== French ===
- Passeur d'enfants à Pondichéry (2000)
- Hypochondriac

== Awards ==
Karnataka State Film Award for Best Art Direction

- 1996–97: Nagamandala
- 1999–2000: Kanooru Heggadithi
- 2002–03: Singaaravva
- 2016: Uppina Kagada

Other awards

- 2004: Chaman Lal Memorial Award for his outstanding contribution to stagecraft
- 2010: Innovative Film Award for Best Art Direction
- 2013: Rajyotsava Prashasti from the government of Karnataka
