= G. S. Bhaskar =

Indian cinematographer

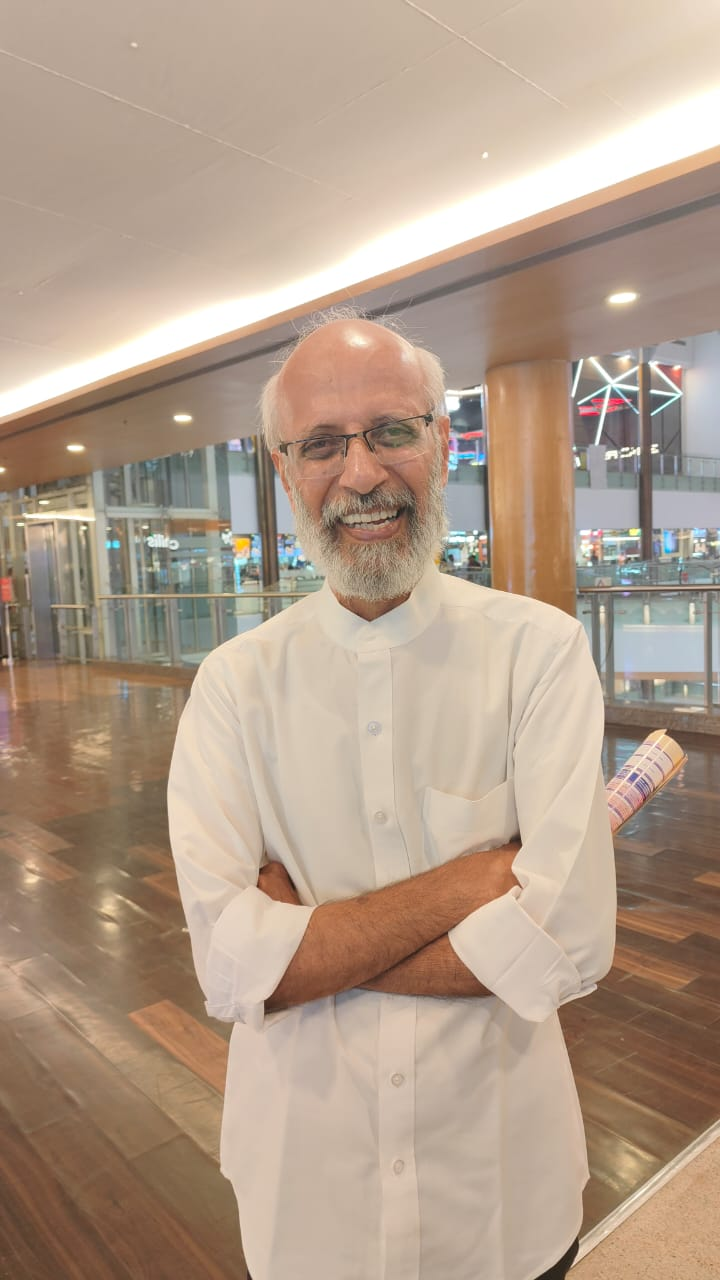
- Born: 2 March 1955 (age 71); Bangalore, Karnataka, India
- Occupation: Cinematographer
- Awards: Karnataka State Film Award for Best Cinematographer

Gauribidanur Suryanarayan Bhaskar (born 2 March 1955) familiarly known as G.S. Bhaskar is an Indian cinematographer. His work is predominantly seen in films belonging to the Indian languages, Kannada and Hindi. He is a member of the Indian Society of Cinematographers. Known for his prominent work as a second camera assistant in the magnum opus Gandhi (1980). Karnataka State Film Award for Best Cinematographer has been bestowed upon him thrice for Nagamandala (1997), Koormavatara (2011) and Mohandas (2019).

Bhaskar has also served as a member of the Jury on Indian National Film Awards.

== Early life ==
G.S Bhaskar was born in Bangalore on 2 March 1955 to G. Suryanarayana Rao and Lakshmidevi. He is the youngest of 4 children. He studied at National High School and National College, Bangalore and obtained his bachelor's degree from Bangalore University.

== Career ==
G.S. Bhaskar began his career as second camera assistant in Sir Richard Attenborough's magnum opus, Gandhi (1980).

It was under the guidance of the well-known Indian film director, Girish Kasaravalli that G S Bhaskar took up film studies at the prestigious Indian film institute, the Pune-based Film and Television Institute of India familiarly known as FTII in 1976.

While studying at FTII he was mentored by the legendary cinematographer, Subrata Mitra It was his classmate, Asvani Kaul who introduced G S Bhaskar to Apurba Kishore Bir, an alumnus of FTII (1971) whom he assisted on several promotional films before joining him as a member of the camera team on GANDHI. He continued to assist A K Bir on three more feature films namely, Pankaj Parashar’s Ab Ayega Mazaa (1982), Sagar Sarhadi’s Tere Sheher Mein (1983) and Prasad Productions’ Mera Ghar Mere Bachche (1984). After his apprenticeship with A K Bir in Mumbai G S Bhaskar came back to Bangalore and joined Girish Kasaravalli as associate director on the national award-winning film Tabarana Kathe (1987). The duo successfully collaborated again on the award-winning documentary, Bharavaseya Hongirana produced by Karnataka government. He filmed a film on conservation titled ‘Afforestation’ (1987) for B S Achar, the well-known photo-journalist and also served as cinematographer for a series of short films on Adult Literacy directed by the pioneer of the ‘New Wave’ in Kannada cinema. Having been one of the early entrants in the field of professional Videography and Digital Cinema he contributed enormously through his creative involvement in the making of innumerable promotional films, documentaries and TVCs.

G S Bhaskar made his debut as cinematographer with Girish Kasaravalli’s maiden telefilm, Bannada Vesha (1988) produced by Doordarshan Kendra. Since then he has continued to serve the cause of meaningful cinema in Kannada as well as Hindi. He has worked as the cinematographer with many renowned filmmakers including M. S. Sathyu, Sai Paranjpye and Nagesh Kukunoor.

He is one of the pioneers of the format of tele-serials in Kannada and worked as the Director of Photography on the much-acclaimed tele-serial, Dodmane (1988) telecast on Doordarshan, Bangalore. His work as the Director of Photography was instrumental in making the tele-serial Guddada Bhootha. A household name and a rage in coastal Karnataka in the early 1990s. Guestline Days by Mohena Singh was another tele serial on which he served as Director of Photography.

== Filmography ==
- Bannada Vesha (1988) (Hindi)
- Ab Ayega Mazaa (1984) (Hindi)
- Meraa Ghar Mere Bachche (1985) (Hindi)
- Disha (1990) (Hindi)
- Kubi Matthu Iyala (1992)
- Galige (1994)
- Nagamandala (1997)
- Saaz (1998) (Hindi)
- Hyderabad Blues 2 (2004) (English)
- Accident (2008)
- Ijjodu (2010)
- Koormavatara (2011)
- ...Re (2016)
- Alama (2017)
- Mookajjiya Kanasugalu (2019)
- Abracadabra (Yet to be released)

== Awards ==
- Best cinematographer 1996–97 Karnataka State Film Awards for the film Nagamandala
- Best cinematographer 2011 Karnataka State Film Awards for the film Koormavatara
- Best cinematographer 2019 Karnataka State Film Awards for the film Mohandas
