= Shama Zaidi =

Indian screenwriter (born 1938)

Shama Zehra Zaidi
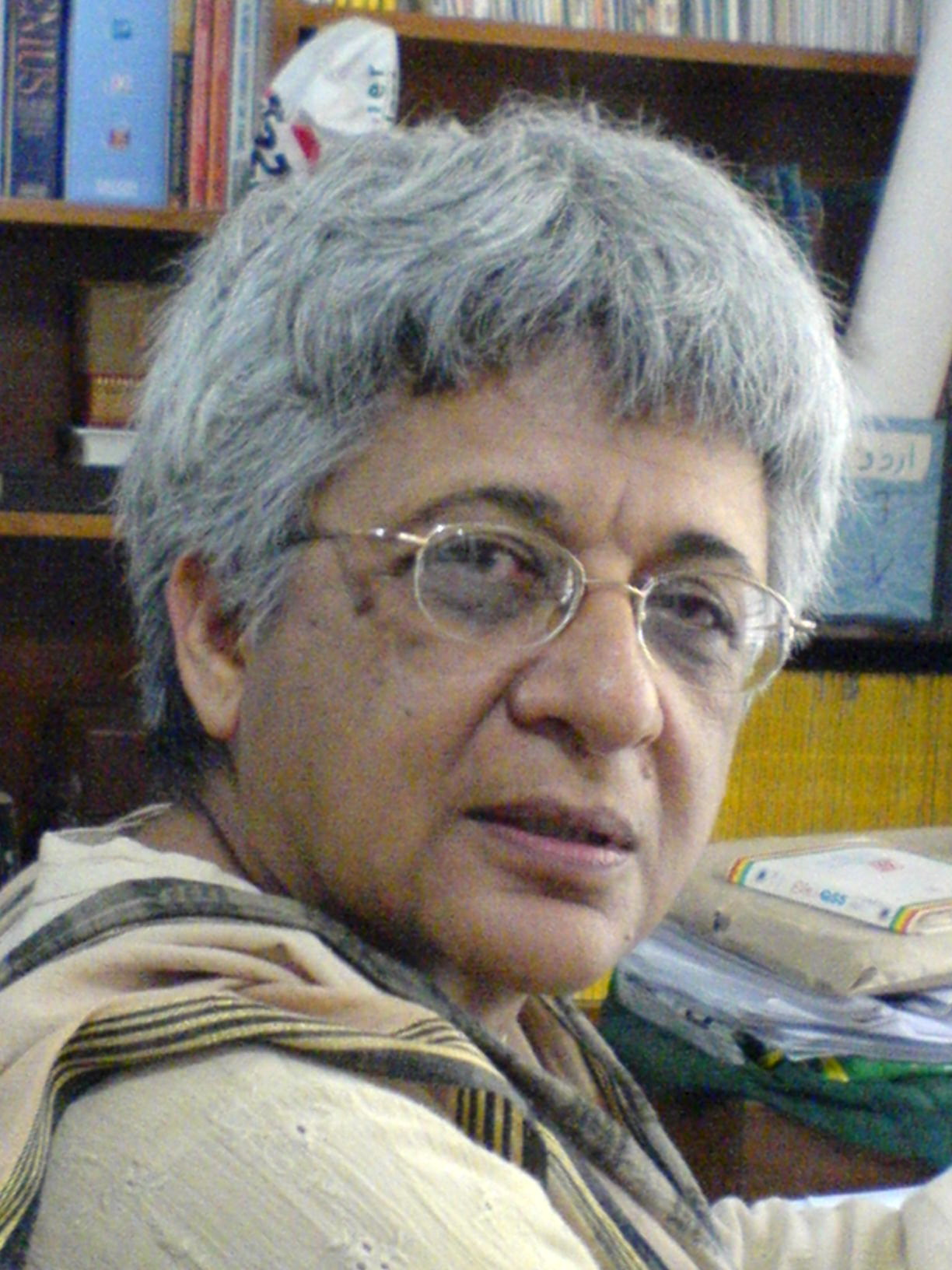
- Born: 25 September 1938 (age 88); Rampur, Rampur State, British India
- Occupations: Screenwriter; costume designer
- Spouse: M. S. Sathyu

Shama Zaidi (born 25 September 1938) is an Indian screenplay writer, costume designer, art director, theatre person, art critic, and documentary film maker. She is married to director M. S. Sathyu. Shama Zaidi was honored with a Lifetime Achievement Award at ICA - International Cultural Artifact Film Festival in 2021.

== Background ==
Shama Zaidi is the daughter of Bashir Hussain Zaidi, a politician and educationist, and his wife Qudsia Zaidi. Her mother was an associate of Habib Tanvir, the communist ideologue and theatre personality. Shama was the only daughter of the couple and she has two brothers. Both her parents were closely associated with the "progressive" communist movement in India, and Shama grew up in a strongly left-wing environment. She was educated at Woodstock School, Mussoorie, and then at Miranda House, New Delhi. She has a bachelor's degree in English from Delhi University, and a diploma in stage design from the Slade School of Art, London. She is praised for her screenwriting in the TV serial "Bharat Ek Khoj".

== Career ==
=== Journalism ===
- Art critic for The Statesman, The Patriot and Shankar's Weekly, New Delhi.
- Written numerous articles on film, theatre, and television for Cinema Vision, Cinema in India, etc., and other journals and newspapers.

=== Theatre ===
Zaidi became interested in costume design while in school at Woodstock, Mussoorie, which had extensive theatre activities. Also due to the influence of her mother Qudsia Zaidi, who started the Hindustani Theatre in the late 1950s with Habib Tanvir and other friends. In her college days at Miranda House she started helping out with the stage productions there, apart from taking an active interest in Hindustani Theatre.

After her B.A., Shama went to Slade School of Art, London, for a one-year course in stage and costume design. She then worked in Germany at the Frankfurt Municipal Theatre as an apprentice and for some time as an observer in the Berliner Ensemble. (Apprentice in stage, film and TV design to Herr Hein Heckroth, Frankfurt am Main, West Germany. Herr Heckroth was the designer of Red Shoes Hoffman's Tales, etc.)

She returned to Delhi in 1961 and designed costumes for Hindustani Theatre before shifting to Bombay in 1965 where she worked as Writer, Designer, Performer and Director for Indian People's Theatre Association (IPTA), Mumbai. Since 1980 she has designed more for films and television than theatre.

She worked as a writer, director, costume designer or art director for the following stage productions –

==== Stage productions ====
- Chou En-lai, a historical costume pageant at Lodi Gardens, New Delhi

==== Hindustani Theatre ====
- Shakuntala (1958) – Costume Design
- Mitti ki Gaadi (1958)- Costume Design & Artiste
- Khalid Ki Khala (1958)- Costume Design & Artiste
- Mudrarakshas (1962) – Direction & Costume Design
- Sufaid Kundali (1963) – Costume Design & Artiste
- Mera Naam Trufaldeen (1964)- Adaptation & Costume Design

==== Indian People's Theatre Association, Mumbai ====
She had been associated with the IPTA's Inter collegiate Drama Competition since 1972 as a jury member.

- Translated/adapted over a dozen plays into Hindustani from various languages.

== Filmography ==
She has written scripts/dialogues for documentaries and feature films with Satyajit Ray, Shyam Benegal, M. S. Sathyu and others. She has also worked as Costume Designer and Art Director.

- Charandas Chor (1975) (The Thief Charandas)

Direction Shyam Benegal; Screenplay Shama Zaidi Based on Habib Tanvir's retelling of a famous Rajasthani folk tale. Songs were by Habib Tanvir and most of the dialogues were improvised by the folk artistes.

- Garm Hava (Hot Winds) 1974 / Colour / 136min / Urdu Direction M S Sathyu; Screenplay Shama Zaidi & Kaifi Azmi; Costume Design Shama Zaidi

Based on a short story by Ismat Chugtai, which she expanded into a film treatment. Filmfare Award for Best Screenplay (shared with Kaifi Azmi).

- Manthan (The Churning) 1976 / Colour / 134min / Hindi

Direction Shyam Benegal; Art direction Shama Zaidi

- Shatranj Ke Khilari शतरंज के खिलाड़ी (Chess Players) 1977 / Hindi

Direction Satyajit Ray; Costume Design Shama Zaidi Also assisted Ray with research on the background material and translated dialogues with Javed Siddiqi for the Indian characters in Urdu.

- Kanneshwara Rama (The Legendary Outlaw) 1977 / Colour / 137min / Kannada & Hindi

Direction M S Sathyu; Script Shama Zaidi Based on the exploits of a legendary dacoit of the Malnad region in Karnataka.

- Bhumika (The Role) 1977 / Colour / 142min / Hindi

Direction Shyam Benegal; Art direction Shama Zaidi Based on the biography of Hansa Wadkar, a star of the Marathi folk theatre and cinema of the 1940s.

- Umrao Jaan (The Courtesan) Colour / Hindi

Direction Muzaffar Ali; Script Shama Zaidi & Javed Siddiqi Based on a 19th-century Urdu novel.

- Chakra (The Wheel) 1980 / Colour / 140min / Hindi

Direction Robin (Rabindra) Dharmraja; Script & Dialogues Shama Zaidi & Javed Siddiqi Based on the novel by Jaywant Dalvi.

- Bara/Sookha (Famine) 1981 / Colour / 140min / Kannada & Hindi

Direction M S Sathyu; Screenplay & Dialogues Shama Zaidi & Javed Siddiqi Based on a short novel by U R Ananthamurthy.

- Aarohan (The Ascent) 1982

Direction Shyam Benegal; Script Shama Zaidi Based on a famous land dispute case.

- Mandi (The Marketplace) 1983 / Colour / 160min / Hindi

Direction Shyam Benegal; Script & Screenplay Shama Zaidi, Shyam Benegal & Satyadev Dubey

- Kahan Kahan Se Guzar Gaya (The Paths I Have Trod) 1985 / Colour / Hindi

Direction M S Sathyu; Original Screenplay Shama Zaidi

- Susman (The Essence) 1986 / Colour / 140min / Hindi

Direction Shyam Benegal; Screenplay Shama Zaidi Original screenplay on the Ikat handloom weavers of Andhra.

- Trikaal (Past, Present, Future) 1986

Direction Shyam Benegal; Screenplay Shama Zaidi & Shyam Benegal Based on an idea by Shyam Benegal.

- Antarnaad (The Inner Voice) 1993

Direction Shyam Benegal; Screenplay Shama Zaidi & Sunil Shanbag An original screenplay based on the Swadhyaya socio-religious movement founded by Pandurang Shastri Athavale.

- Suraj Ka Satvan Ghoda (The Seventh Horse of the Sun) 1994

Direction Shyam Benegal; Screenplay Shama Zaidi A puzzle screenplay based on the novel by Dharamvir Bharati.

- Galige 1994

Direction M. S. Sathyu; Screenplay S. Ramaswamy, Shama Zaidi & Satish Sehgal

- Mammo 1995

Direction Shyam Benegal; Screenplay Shama Zaidi & Khalid Mohamed

- The Making of the Mahatma 1996

Direction Shyam Benegal; Script Shama Zaidi, Shyam Benegal & Fatima Meer An Indo-South African co production on Mahatma Gandhi's life in South Africa.

- Sardari Begum 1997 / Colour / 123min / Urdu

Direction Shyam Benegal; Screenplay Shama Zaidi & Khalid Mohamed

- Nishant

Art direction Shama Zaidi

- Mrigtrishna

Costume Design Shama Zaidi

- Haribhari 2000 / Colour / Hindi

Direction Shyam Benegal; Script & Dialogues Shama Zaidi A film on women's empowerment made for the Ministry of Family Welfare.

- Zubeidaa 2001/ Colour / Hindi

Direction Shyam Benegal; Additional screenplay and dialogues Shama Zaidi

- Netaji Subhas Chandra Bose: The Forgotten Hero 2002-04/ Colour/Hindi-English

Direction Shyam Benegal; Script and Dialogues Shama Zaidi & Atul Tiwari A film on the last years of Subhas Chandra Bose for Sahara Entertainment

- Chamki Chameli 2005-2006/ Colour/ Hindi

Direction Shyam Benegal; Screenplay and dialogues Shama Zaidi & Atul Tiwari A film inspired by the 19th-century novella "Carmen" by Prosper Mérimée

- Mujib: The Making of a Nation 2019-22/ Colour/Bengali

Direction Shyam Benegal; Script and Dialogues Shama Zaidi & Atul Tiwari A film on the life of Bangabandhu
