= 1996–97 Karnataka State Film Awards =

Annual Indian film awards ceremony

The Karnataka State Film Awards 1996–97, presented by the Government of Karnataka, honoured the best of Kannada Cinema released in the year 1996.

== Lifetime achievement award ==
Name of Award	Awardee(s)	Awarded As
• Dr. Rajkumar Award • Puttanna Kanagal Award	• M. N. Basavarajaiah • S. V. Rajendra Singh Babu	• Studio Owner • Director

== Jury ==
A committee headed by G. V. Iyer was appointed to evaluate the awards.

== Film awards ==
Name of Award	Film	Producer	Director
First Best Film	America America	G. Nandakumar	Nagathihalli Chandrashekar
Second Best Film	Nagamandala	Srihari L. Khoday	T. S. Nagabharana
Third Best Film	Nagareeka	Saraswathi Gopal Jois	Y. Nanjundappa
Best Film Of Social Concern	Karadipura	Rajalakshmi Ramachandrappa	Baraguru Ramachandrappa
Best Children Film	Vyuha		
Best Regional Film	Bogsane (Konkani language)		

== Other awards ==
Name of Award	Film	Awardee(s)
Best Direction	America America	Nagathihalli Chandrashekar
Best Actor	America America	Ramesh Aravind
Best Actress	Janumada Jodi	Shilpa
Best Supporting Actor	Nagamandala	Mandya Ramesh
Best Supporting Actress	Nagamandala	B. Jayashree
Best Child Actor	Nammoora Mandara Hoove	Vinayak Joshi
Best Music Direction	Janumada Jodi	V. Manohar
Best Male Playback Singer	Janumada Jodi ("Kolumande Jangama Devaru")	L. N. Shastry
Best Female Playback Singer	Nammoora Mandara Hoove (All Songs)	K. S. Chitra
Best Cinematography	Nagamandala	G. S. Bhaskar
Best Editing	Amrutha Varshini	B. S. Kemparaju
Best Lyrics	Janumada Jodi ("Kolumande Jangama Devaru")	Doddarange Gowda
Best Sound Recording	Amrutha Varshini	Mahendar
Best Art Direction	Nagamandala	Shashidhar Adapa
Best Story Writer	America America	Nagathihalli Chandrashekar
Best Screenplay	Amrutha Varshini	Dinesh Baboo
Best Dialogue Writer	Janumada Jodi	Baraguru Ramachandrappa
Jury's Special Award	Janumada Jodi (For Film)	Producer: Parvathamma Rajkumar; Director: T. S. Nagabharana
