= Naga Kiran =

Indian actor (born 1983)

- Born: 12 November 1983 (age 42); Somarpet, Kodagu
- Occupation: Actor
- Notable work: Vasanthakala, Pallavi Illada Charana, Anu
- Spouse: Akshata (m. 2015)

Naga Kiran is an Indian actor, known for his work in Kannada-language films.

== Career ==
Naga Kiran is from Somarpet, Kodaguand, and he started his career with modelling under model trainer Prasad Bidapa. After moving on to acting, he started taking roles. His first movie was the Telugu-language film Something Special, which also starred Sherlyn Chopra and Sunaina, though the movie did not do well at the box office.

His next roles were in Kannada-language movies such as Marujanma (based on reincarnation), Vasanthakala, Pallavi Illada Charana, Anu (also starring Pooja Gandhi), Mast Maja Madi, Male Barali Manju Irali, Ijjodu, Parie, and Lahari. He received critical acclaim for his role in Ijjodu, which was directed by M.S. Sathyu. Movies such as Mast Maja Madi and Male Barali Manju Irali did well at the box office.

== Filmography ==
- Note: all work is in Kannada, unless otherwise noted.

Year	Title	Role	Notes
2006	Something Special		Telugu film
2008	Marujanma		
2008	Mast Maja Maadi	Shyam	
2008	Vasanthakala	Abhi	
2008	Pallavi Illada Charana		
2009	Male Barali Manju Irali	Prem	
2009	Anu	Anand	
2009	Jaaji Mallige	Dr. Prashanth	
2010	Ijjodu		
2011	Noorondu Bagilu		
2012	Parie	Chandru	
2015	Lahari		
2015	Nigraha Dala		
2015	Angel		
2015	Thaliru Thorana		
2018	Adarsha	Adarsh	

=== Television ===
Year	Title	Role	Channel	Notes
2016	Mahanadi	Vikrama Simha	Zee Kannada	Serial debut
2017	Sanju Mattu Naanu	Bharat	Colors Kannada	Guest appearance
