= Sudhir Attavar =

Indian film director

Sudheer Attavar
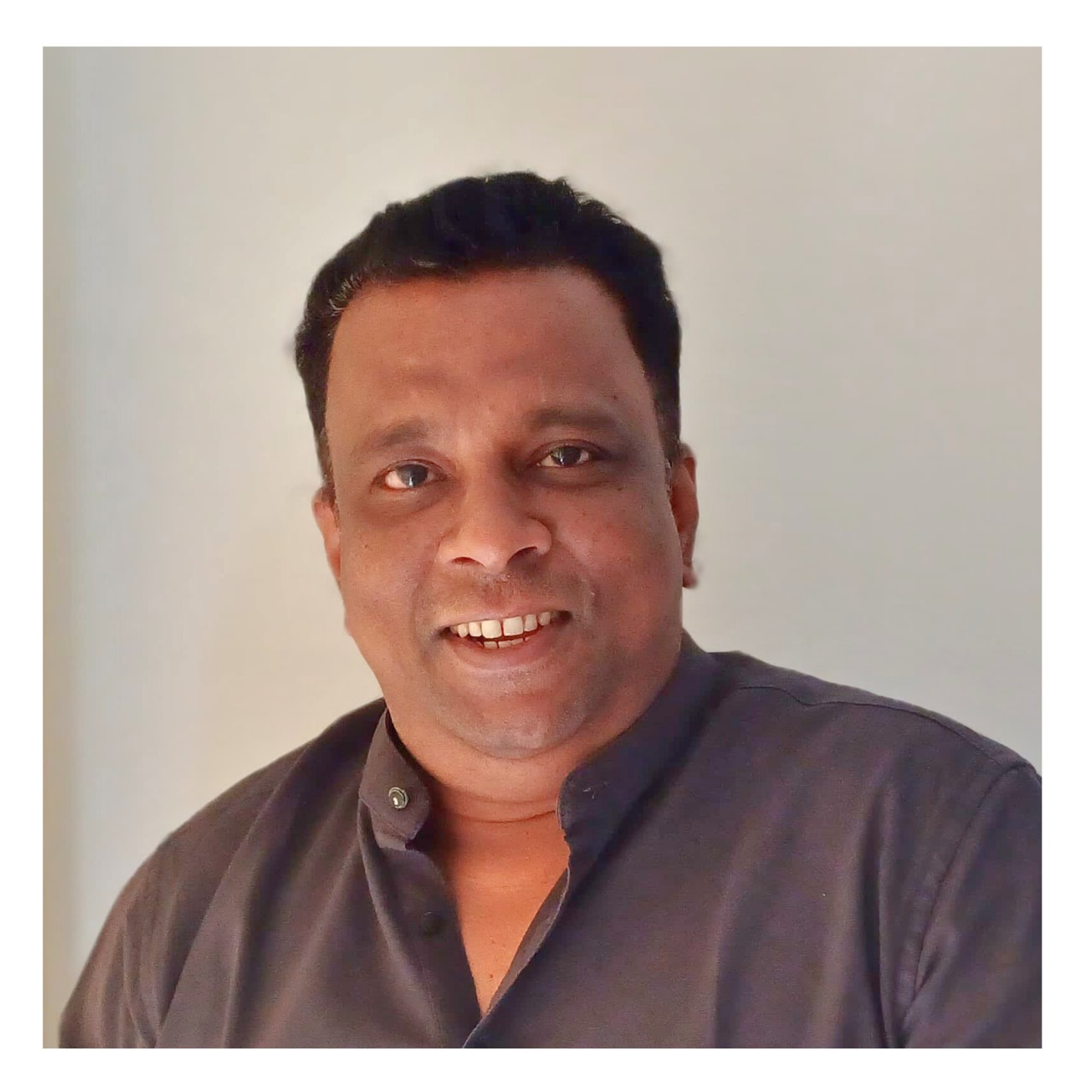
- Born: Mangalore, Karnataka
- Education: BE ITS (ex)
- Occupations: Film Director, Lyricist
- Spouse: Rajashree Sudheer
- Children: Shlaghya Kamalini

Sudheer Attavar is an Indian film director-lyricist and Sahitya Academy awarded author who predominantly works in South Indian films. His Kannada film Mrityorma, produced by Trivikrama Sapalya, won a special jury award in Jaipur International Film Festival. He is the director of Parie, a 2012 Kannada-language film with three Padma Shri awardees; M S Sathyu, Usha Uthup and Nemai Ghosh. His film MADI received Global Best Social Awareness Film Award in 7th Rajasthan International Film Festival and Best Director Award in 2021. He received Sahitya Akademi Award for Gul E Bakavali. This play was represented in the 8th World Theatre Olympics. He is the producer of the film Munnudi which received a National Award. Kabir Bedi made his Kannada film debut in Kari Haida KORAGAJJA, film directed by Sudheer Attavar and produced by Trivikram Sapalya. His film career started as a lyricist. His debut film was IJJODU by BIG Pictures and later wrote more than 50 film songs in Kannada & Tulu. He started Success Films International, a production house with editor Vidyadhar Shetty.

Sudheer Attavar received the Best Director award from Governor of Maharashtra Ramesh Bais for his film Mrityorma at 6th Moon White Films International Film Festival. Presented by Bhajan Samrat Anup Jalota, the Kannada film Mrityorma directed by Sudheer Attavar bagged 4 awards including Best Film and Best Director at the closing ceremony award night of the Festival. The film was nominated for awards in a total of 5 categories

Sudheer Attavar has spoken out against the negative reviews immediately after the release of a movie. In a recent interaction with the media, Attavar demanded that negative reviews be released only after 8-10 days of the film release. The director blamed the negative publicity for the failure of films at the box office.

== Awards ==
- 2024-Special Jury Award in Jaipur International Film Festival for Mrityorma
- 2023-Best Director & Best Film in 6th Moon White Films International Film Festival (MWFIFF) for Mrityorma
- 2021-Best Director in 7th Rajasthan International Film Festival for MADI
- 2021- Global Best Social Awareness Award in 7th Rajasthan International Film Festival (RIFF)
- 2016- Karnataka Sahitya Academy Award "Bakavaliya Hoo" (Gul eh Bakavali)
- 2010- Rising Star Award by Big FM 92.7 for Best Lyrics
- 2009- Radio Mirchy Award Best Upcoming Lyricist in year
- 2009- Radio Mirchy Award Best song Marali Mareyagi
- 2009- Radio Mirchy Critics Award for Best Song Marali Mareyagi
- 2001- National Award for Best Social Awareness MUNNUDI

== Films ==
- Parie ( Kannada, 2012)
- Madi( Kannada, 2018)
- Mrithyorma (Kannada 2022)
- Navri (2023)
- Kari Haida KORAGAJJA (Kannada, 2023)
- Koragajja (film)

== Songs ==
No.	Title	Lyrics	Singer(s)	Length
1.	"Mugilina Maathu"	Sudheer Attavar	Udit Narayan, Sadhana Sargam	4:27
2.	"Mirugutide Yedeyolage"	Sudheer Attavar	Shaan, Gayatri Iyer	5:17
3.	"Kandikeri Hudugaranna"	Sudheer Attavar	Priya Himesh	5:08
4.	"Mukha vittu naa"	Sudheer Attavar	M. D. Pallavi	5:14
5.	"Kaadige Kanna Kanmani"	Sudheer Attavar	Benny Dayal & Chaitra	5:07
6.	"Jhoom Jhoom Zara"	Sudheer Attavar	Usha Uthup	5:44
7.	"Marali Mareyagi"	Sudheer Attavar	Sadhana Sargam	5:04
8.	"Bisilu Taagi"	Sudheer Attavar	Benny Dayal	5:05
9.	"Rithm ide Lifini"	Sudheer Attavar	Karthik	5:03
10.	"Ello Jinugiruva Neeru"	Sudheer Attavar	Shreya Ghoshal	5:10
11.	"Ele mele Ele Bisilu"	Sudheer Attavar	M. D. Pallavi	5:16
12.	"Aatmeeya manase"	Sudheer Attavar	Shankar Mahadevan	5:09
13.	"Pacche Kuralda"	Sudheer Attavar	Javed Ali	5:10
