= Karnikotsava =

Karnikotsava or prophecy is an ancient tradition followed by the Kuruba Gowda community of Karnataka. It is organised every year during the Mailara Jaatre in Bellary district of Karnataka. It is usually conducted in the month of February. The designated "Gorava," standing on top of a ten-foot bow, prophesies what to expect in the coming year and lets himself down from that height to be caught by the devotees below. The Gorava, a follower of Mylara Lingeshwara, wearing a traditional overcoat of wool and headgear, traditionally fasts for the 11 days of the fair before prophesying on the penultimate day.
