= Chandrashekhara Kambara =

Indian poet and playwright (born 1937)

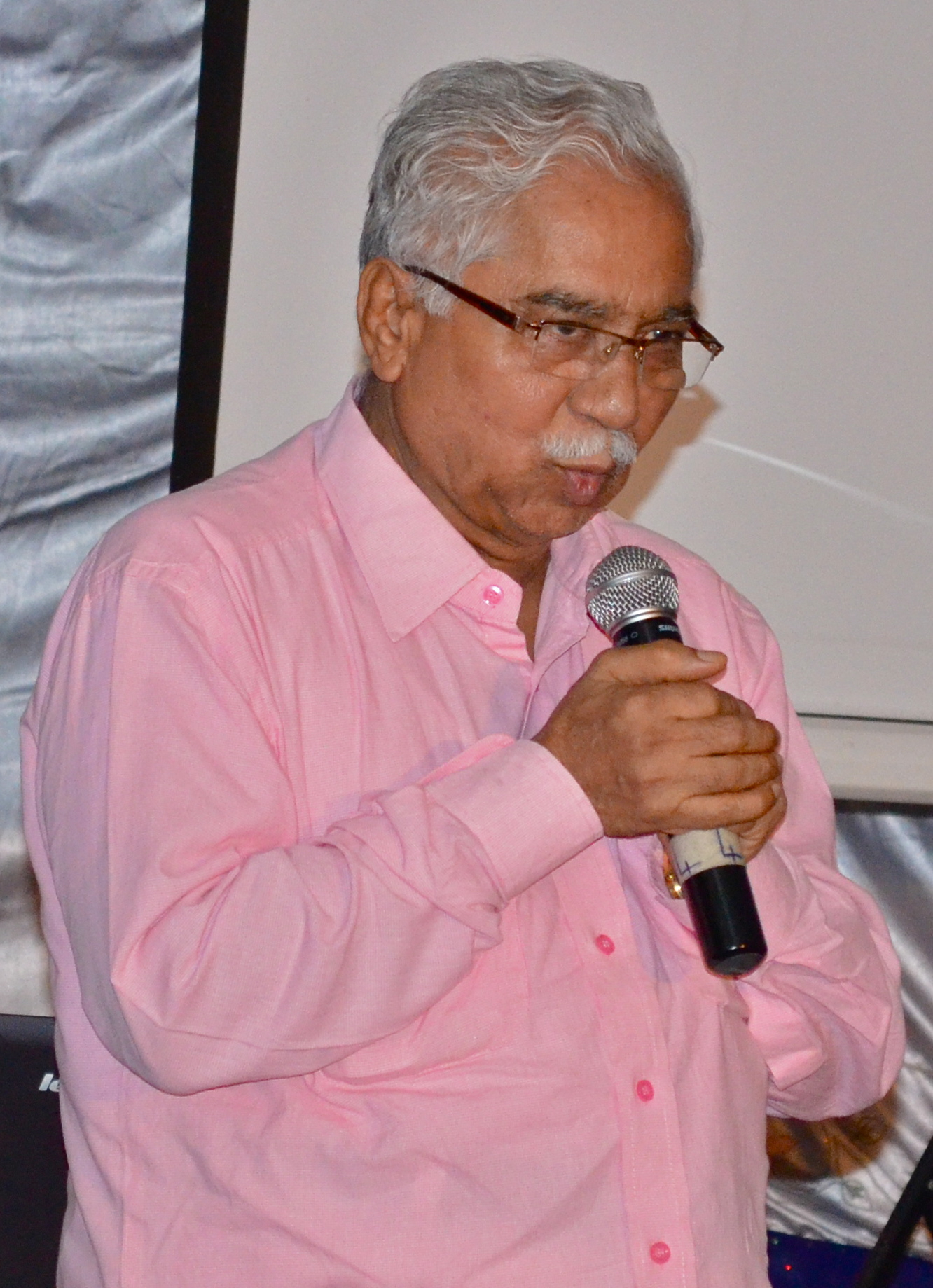
- Kambara during a talk about "Kannada in Technology" in Bangalore, 2013
- Born: 2 January 1937 (age 89); Ghodageri, Belagavi, Bombay Presidency, British India (Present day Karnataka, India)
- Education: PhD from Karnataka University, Dharwad
- Occupations: Poet: Playwright; Professor
- Spouse: Satyabhama
- Children: 4
- Writing career
- Period: 1937–present
- Genre: Fiction
- Notable awards: Jnanpith Award; Sahitya Akademi Award; Padma Shri; Pampa Award; Padma Bhushan

Chandrashekhara Basavanneppa Kambara (born 2 January 1937) is a prominent Indian poet, playwright, folklorist, film director in Kannada language and the founder-vice-chancellor of Kannada University in Hampi also president of the Sahitya Akademi, country's premier literary institution, after Vinayak Krishna Gokak (1983) and U.R. Ananthamurthy (1993). He is known for effective adaptation of the North Karnataka dialect of the Kannada language in his plays, and poems, in a similar style as in the works of D.R. Bendre.

Kambara's plays mainly revolve around folk or mythology interlinked with contemporary issues, inculcating modern lifestyle with his hard-hitting poems. He has become a pioneer of such literature. His contribution as a playwright is significant not only to Kannada theatre but also to the Indian theatre in general as he achieved a blend of the folk and the modern theatrical forms.

He has been conferred with many prestigious awards including the Padma Bhushan in 2021, Jnanpith Award in 2011 for the year 2010, Sahitya Akademi Award, the Padma Shri by Government of India, Kabir Samman, Kalidas Samman and Pampa Award. After his retirement, Kambara was nominated as the Member of Karnataka Legislative Council, to which he made significant contributions through his interventions.

== Early life ==
Chandrashekhara Kambara was born in kannada-speaking family in Ghodageri, a village in Belgaum district of Bombay Presidency (today in Karnataka). He was the third son in the family, with brothers Parasappa and Yallappa who still reside in the small house belonging to the Kambara family in the village. From an early age, Kambara was interested in folk arts, local culture and ritual. His favorite Kannada writers include Kumara Vyasa, Basava, Kuvempu and Gopalakrishna Adiga and among English writers, it is W. B. Yeats, William Shakespeare and Federico García Lorca.

Popularly known as Shivapur Kambar Master in his native district, Kambara had his schooling in Gokak and returned to Belagavi for higher education at Lingaraj College. Owing to poverty, he had to drop out of school but Jagadguru Siddaram Swamiji of Savalagi Matha blessed Kambara and took care of all his primary and high school educational expenses which is why Kambara honours the seer in many of his writings. After his post-graduation, he did his PhD thesis on Uttara Karnatakada Janapad Rangbhumi ("The Folk Theatre of North Karnataka") from Karnataka University, Dharwad.

== Career ==
After a brief stint in teaching in the University of Chicago, he taught in Bangalore University for over two decades and was a Fulbright scholar.

He has been elected as the chairman of Sahitya Academy on 12 February 2018.

He served as the chairman of National School of Drama Society, New Delhi from 1996 to 2000 and as the president of Karnataka Nataka Academy from 1980 to 1983. He started using north Karnataka dialect of Kannada in his poems and plays which is not very common in Kannada literature.

Kambara is the founder vice-chancellor of the Kannada University at Hampi. His vision of Kannada literature and Karnataka culture is reflected in the way he showed commitment to build it, such as the architecture, the choice of the subjects that cover the diverse variety of culture and society of Karnataka, selection of place, faculty or academic activities, the scholars whom he drafted from different parts of the state and the Nadoja honorary award instead of the honorary doctorate which he introduced.

As the first vice-chancellor of the University, Kambara served two terms of three years each, during which he could shape it in a unique manner, compared to other traditional universities. All the constructions during his tenure as the vice-chancellor are on hillocks, with huge stone structures resembling the Vijayanagara period architecture. He also created a separate publication unit for publishing the results of research and project works going on in Kannada University.

He is a strong supporter of imparting school education with Kannada language as the medium of instruction. His justification for this stance is that only mother tongue can provide an "experience," which is an integral part of learning and learning through any other language only gives people "information," which makes them less competent. This concurs with UNESCO's recommendation that "providing education in a child's mother tongue is a critical issue."

== Works ==
Kambara has to his credit 25 plays, 11 anthologies of poems, 5 novels, 16 research works and several scholarly write-ups on folk theatre, literature and education. Some of his popular plays include "Jokumaraswamy", "Jayasidnayaka", "Kadu Kudure", "Nayi Kathe", "Mahamayi", "Harakeya Kuri" and others. He was conferred with the Sahitya Akademi Award in 1991 for another popular play Sirisampige.

He was a pioneer in introducing Bailahongal's famous Sangya Balya (bayalata) and Jokumaraswamy, a traditional ritual of his native district, to the literary world which have seen thousands of performances, not only in Kannada, but several other Indian languages as well. His most recent novel, Shikhar Soorya, is rated among the best Kannada novels.

Many of his works have been translated to English and several other Indian languages. The play Jokumaraswamy has been translated to English (Seagull Books, Calcutta in 1989), Marathi (Abholi Prakashan, Solhapur in 2000), Hindi (Vidya Prakashan Mandir, New Delhi in 1985), Telugu (Mudrika Printers, Kurnool in 1993), Tamil, Punjabi and Malayalam among others. The Sahitya Akademi Award-winning play Sirisampige has been translated to English (Seagull Books) and to Tamil, Hindi, Marathi and Rajasthani by the Sahitya Akademi, New Delhi. His novel "Singarevva Mattu Aramane" translated as Kulothe Chingaramma, to Malayalam by C Raghavan, is one of his works that has become popular in Kerala.

Apart from his literary career, Kambara has been associated with direction of feature films. His directorial work in many movies on the plays scripted by him; he has directed films such as Karimayi, Sangeeta and Kadu Kudare. Jeeke Maastara Pranaya Prasanga. Two of his plays which have been made into television series. His contributions include many documentaries for the Government of Karnataka and Government of India. His "Kaadu Kudure" entered into the Indian Panorama and won the National Award. His film "Sangeeta" won the Best Feature Film State Award in the year 1981. He has also adopted his play G.K. Maastarara Pranaya Prasanga for television.

Besides his voluminous works, Kambar has presented papers on Indian Folklore and theatre in the University of Chicago, American Oriental Centre, New York, International Theatre Institute – Berlin, Moscow, and Jade: Akita Japan and many universities and cultural organizations in India. The Folklore Dictionary he compiled for Kannada Sahitya Parishad is a monumental work.

== Themes ==
In his lengthy narrative poem Helatena Kela ("Listen, I will tell you") in the early 1960s, Kambara introduced some of the recurring themes which he would often return to in his later works. Themes of tradition and modernity, crises of feudalism, native identities, colonialism, march of history, sex, loss of faith, the death of God and several related themes explored later in his plays, novels and poetry had found metaphorical expression in the narrative poem. The eponymous, long narrative poem has the musicality and rhythm of the Lavani form and uses rich earthy imagery.

Shivapura is an imaginary utopian village which continues to be a character, a metaphor and the locale in most of his works. It forms the locus of his poems and tales. In his characterisation, Lord Shiva and Parvati visit the place and bless the villagers. Even Rama, when he was going to Sri Lanka in search of Sita, visits the village en route.

== Filmography ==
- Karimaayi (1975) (director)
- Kaadu Kudure (1979) (director)
- Sangeeta (1980) (director)
- G.K. Maastarara Pranaya Prasanga (1986) (television)
- Rishyashringa (1970)
- Huliya Neralu (1980)
- Singaaravva (1982) (writer)
- Harakeya Kuri (1983) (writer)

== Awards and honours ==
=== Central awards ===
- Viswambhara Dr C Narayana Reddy National Literary Award (2019)
- Padma Bhushan (2021)
- Sangeet Natak Akademi Fellowship (2011)
- Jnanpith Award (2010)
- Padma Shri (2001)
- Sahitya Akademi Award (1991)
- Sangeet Natak Akademi Award (1983)

=== State awards ===
- Kadammanitta Ramakrishnan Award (Kerala, 2018)
- Sangeet Natak Akademi Fellowship (Akademy Ratna Award, 2011)
- Devaraj Urs Award (Karnataka, 2007)
- Joshua Sahitya Puraskaram (Andhra Pradesh, 2005)
- Nadoja Award (2004)
- Pampa Award (2004)
- Sant Kabir Award (2002)
- Masti Award (Karnataka, 1997)
- Janapada and Yakshagana Academy Award (1993)
- Karnataka Sahitya Academy (1989)
- Rajyotsava Award (Karnataka, 1988)
- Nandikar Award (Calcutta, 1987)
- Karnataka Natak Academy (1987)
- Kumaran Ashan Award (Kerala, 1982)
- Kannada Sahitya Parishat (1975)

Five of his books have been awarded by the Karnataka Sahitya Academy. His well-known play Jokumaraswamy has won the "Kamaladevi Chattopadhyaya Award" of Natya Sangh as the "Best Play of the Year" in India in the year 1975. Another popular play Jaisidanayaka won the Vardhamaana Prashasti as the "Best Book of the Year" – 1975 in Karnataka.

His Saavirada Neralu won the "Ashan Award" (Kerala) as the best collection of poems in 1982. He won the K.V. Shankare Gowda Award for Theatre in 1990. He is the recipient of the Sangeet Natak Akademi Award, New Delhi, for playwrighting in the year 1983 and the Sahitya Akademi Award, New Delhi, for the play Siri Sampige in 1991.

Kambara received the eighth Jnanpith Award for the Kannada language, the highest literary honour conferred in India, in September 2011 for the year 2010. The prestigious award which was instituted in 1961, carries a cheque for ₹ 750,000, a citation and a bronze replica of goddess Vagdevi. The Chief Minister of Karnataka, D. V. Sadananda Gowda was among the many dignitaries who wished him well on the occasion of receiving this award. At a felicitation ceremony held a week after winning the award, the Government of Karnataka announced that it will reprint all works of Kambara, including his plays and make them available at all government school libraries. His works will also be translated to different languages. A drama festival featuring his plays will be staged to honour the laureate.

== List of works ==
His contribution to Kannada literature in the field of poetry, plays, novels and stories, and on his research and political perceptions are listed below.

=== Poetry ===
- Mugulu (1958)
- Helatena Kela (1964)
- Takararinavaru (1971) [Karnataka Sahitya Akademi Award for Poetry]
- Saavirada Neralu (1979) [Ashan Award – 1982, Kerala]
- Aayda Kavanagalu (1980)
- Belli Meenu (1989)
- Akkakku Haadugale (1993)
- Eevaregina Helatena Kela (1993)
- Chakori (1996) [Translated into English, 1999]
- Rocks of Hampi (Collection of Poems Translated into English by O. L. Nagabhushana Swamy, 2004)
- Ayda Kavitegalu (Akshara Prakashana, 2007)
- Ellide Shivapura (2009)
- Samagra Kavya (2018)

=== Plays ===
- Bembattida Kannu – 1961
- Narcissus – 1969
- Rishyashringa (Filmed) – 1970
- Jokumaraswamy – 1972
- Chalesha — 1973 (translated to Hindi by Dakshina Bharath Hindi Prachar Sabha, Madras in 1973)
- Sangya Balya Anabeko Naadolaga – 1975
- Kittiya Kathe – 1974
- Jasisidanayaka – 1975 (Translated to Hindi by Saraswathi Vihar, New Delhi in 1984 and English. State Academy of Literature Award and "Vardhamana Prashasti" as the Best Book of the Year in Kannada)
- Alibaba – 1980 (translated and published in Indian Literature, Sahitya Academy)
- Kaadu Kudure – 1979 (Filmed and received National Award)
- Naayi Kathe – 1980 (Filmed as Sangeeta and received 5 Karnataka State Film Awards)
- Kharokhara – 1977
- Mathanthara – 1978
- Harakeya Kuri – 1983 (Filmed and received National Award, translated into Hindi by Gyan Bharathi, New Delhi in 1989)
- Kambara Avara Natakagalu – 1984
- Sambashiva Prahasana – 1987 (Translated into Hindi, English by Seagull Books, Calcutta in 1991 and Tamil)
- Siri Sampige (Sahitya Akademi Award, 1991)
- Huliya Neralu (Filmed) – 1980
- Tirukana Kanasu – 1989
- Pushpa Rani – 1990
- Boleshankara – 1991
- Mahamayi – 1999 (Translated into English by NSD, New Delhi in 2000 and Hindi)
- Nela Sampige – 2004 (Collection of Plays published by Kannada Pustaka Pradhikara, Government of Karnataka)
- Jakkana – 2008
- Shivaratri – 2011
- Maarikadu

=== Novels ===
- Anna Tangi – 1956
- Karimaayi – 1975 (Filmed)
- G.K. Maastarara Pranaya Prasanga – 1986 (filmed for Doordarshan, translated to Hindi by Vidya Prakashan Mandir, New Delhi)
- Singarevva Mattu Aramane – 1982 (State Academy of Literature Award, translated to English by Katha Books, New Delhi in 2002, Hindi by Radhakrishna Prakashan, New Delhi in 1984 and to Malayalam by DC Books, Kottayam in 1999 as Kulothe Chingaramma) (Filmed by T. S. Nagabharana)
- Shikhara Soorya – 2007 (published by Akshara Prakashana and second edition by Ankita Pustaka)
- Shivana Dangura - 2015

=== Research and critical perceptions ===
- Uttara Karnataka Janapada Rangabhumi – 1980
- Sangya Balya – 1966
- Bannisi Hadavva Nana Balaga – 1968
- Bayalaatagalu – 1973
- Matado Lingave – 1973
- Namma Janapada – 1980
- Bandire Nanna Jayolage – 1981
- Kannada Folklore Dictionary (2 volumes) – 1985
- Bedara Huduga Mattu Gilli – 1989 (State Academy of Literature Award)
- Lakshapathi Rajana Kathe – 1986
- Kasigondu Seru – 1989
- Nelada Mareya Nidhana – 1993
- Brihaddesiya Chintana – 2001
- An Anthology of Modern India Plays for the National School of Drama – 2000
- Desheeya Chintana – 2004 (collection of articles on culture and literature. Published by Ankita Pustaka)
- Tudi Irada Daari - 2009
- Marave Marmarave – 2007
- Idu Desi – 2010
- Smit - 1968

== See also ==
- Kannada language
- Kannada literature
- Kannada poetry
