= Parie =

- Directed by: Sudheer Attavar
- Written by: Sampanna Mutalik
- Produced by: M C Gowda; Ramakrishna Bhat; Nithyanand N; Mogan Babu; Divija K
- Starring: Rakesh Adiga; Naga Kiran; Nivedhitha
- Cinematography: Ananth Urs
- Edited by: Vidyadhar Shetty
- Music by: Veer Samarth
- Release date: 27 April 2012
- Country: India
- Language: Kannada

Parie is a 2012 Indian Kannada-language romance film starring Rakesh Adiga and Nivedhitha. The film is directed by Sudheer Attavar and Veer Samarth is the music director. In total, there are seven producers for this movie. Veterans M. S. Sathyu and Nimay Ghosh were hired for art direction and cinematography respectively. The film made its theatrical release on 27 April 2012.

== Cast ==
- Rakesh Adiga as Bharadhwaj
- Nivedhitha as Parie
- Usha Uthup
- Naga Kiran as Chandru
- Harshika Poonacha as Sumedha
- Vikram Udayakumar
- Sharath Lohitashwa
- Srinivas Prabhu
- Hemangini Ka as in a cameo appearance

== Soundtrack ==
Parie

Soundtrack album by Veer Samarth
- Released: 2012
- Recorded: 2012
- Genre: Feature film soundtrack
- Length: 29:07
- Language: Kannada

Official audio
- Parie - Full Album on YouTube

No.	Title	Lyrics	Singer(s)	Length
1.	"Mugilina Maathu"	Sudheer Attavar	Udit Narayan, Sadhana Sargam	4:27
2.	"Mirugutide Yedeyolage"	Sudheer Attavar	Shaan, Gayatri Iyer	5:17
3.	"Kandikeri Hudugaranna"	Sudheer Attavar	Priya Himesh	5:08
4.	"Ninna Premada Pariya"	K S Narasimha swamy	S. P. Balasubrahmanyam	4:19
5.	"Ashada Kaledaithe"	Sudheer Attavar	B. K. Sumitra, Manikka Vinayagam, Mysore Janni, Samanvitha	4:52
6.	"Jhoom Jhoom Zara"	Sudheer Attavar	Usha Uthup	5:44
Total length:				29:07

== Release and reception ==
The film, for the first time in the Kannada film industry, had a special pre-release premiere show held in Mumbai on 15 April 2012. Arranged and hosted by M. S. Sathyu and the director Sudhir Attavar, the venue was at Cinemax Multiplex in Andheri.

=== Critical reception ===
The Times of India scored the film at 4 out of 5 stars and says "While Rakesh tops the list with a brilliant performance, Nivedita is lively as the girl next door. Harshika, though impressive, doesn’t fit into the role. Nagakiran, Satya and Srinivas Prabhu have done justice. Music by Veera Samarth has some catchy tunes, especially the number ‘Mugilina maatu…’ News18 India wrote "For the mood of the film Ananth Urs camera whirrs to showcase the developments. The costumes for this film are pretty good. Rediff.com wrote "Harshika Poonacha looks very glamorous but too young for the role, though she has acquitted herself commendably. Nagkiran doesn't have much of a role. Srinivasa Prabhu shines as Parie's father.". S Viswanath from Deccan Herald wrote "Mainly drawing its sustenance from the tragic and troublesome romance played out against the backdrop of illicit liquor trade Parie’s family are in, the film turns out into potent potion of heady cocktail giving one heavy, head-banging hangover. "
