= Nadig =

Nadig is a surname. Notable people with the surname include:

- Friederike Nadig (1897–1970), German politician
- Kruttika Nadig, Indian chess player
- Marie-Theres Nadig (born 1954), Swiss alpine skier
- Sumatheendra R. Nadig (born 1935), Indian poet
