= Shimoga Venkatesh =

Indian actor (died 2007)

- Died: 4 February 2007 (aged 61); Shimoga, Karnataka, India
- Other name: Shivamogga Venkatesh
- Occupation: Actor

Shimoga Venkatesh (died 4 February 2007) was an Indian actor. He was best known for his work on stage appearing in plays in Kannada during the modern theatre movement 1970s and 1980s. He was involved with theatre groups such as Benaka, Rangasampada and Nataranga of Bangalore. Venkatesh also appeared in films and television.

== Biography ==
Venkatesh was involved in the modern theatre movement in his home State of Karnataka starting the 1970s. He appeared in Bhutto, Hamlet, Kattale Belaku, Nammolagobba Najookaiah, Aaspota, Tughlaq, Mooru Kaasina Aata, Mṛcchakatika, Macbeth, Hayavadana, Oedipus Rex and Uttama Prabhutwa Lolalotte among others. He frequently collaborated with theatre personalities such as T. N. Seetharam, T. S. Nagabharana, Girish Karnad and M. S. Sathyu.

On screen, he starred as a character actor, and appeared in films such as Bili Hendthi (1975), Chomana Dudi (1975), Kanneshwara Rama (1977), Kittu Puttu (1977), Accident (1985), Chapala Chennigaraya (1990), S. P. Bhargavi (1991) and Mysore Mallige (1992). On telelvision, he appeared in Namma Nammalli, Bhagya, Sankranti, Aaghagata, Silli Lalli and Pa Pa Pandu.

== Filmography ==
=== Films ===
- Bili Hendthi (1975)
- Chomana Dudi (1975)
- Kanneshwara Rama (1977)
- Kittu Puttu (1977)
- Accident (1985)
- Balondu Bhavageethe (1988)
- Chapala Chennigaraya (1990)
- Kalyana Mantapa (1991)
- S. P. Bhargavi (1991)
- Gandharva (1992)
- Midida Shruthi (1992)
- Mysore Mallige (1992)
- Undu Hoda Kondu Hoda (1992)
- Bahaddur Hennu (1993)
- Sangharsha (1993)
- Kotreshi Kanasu (1995)
- Munnudi (2000)
- Odu (2003)
- Sacchi (2003)

=== Television ===
- Aaghaata
- Namma Nammalli
- Bhagya
- Sankranti
- Silli Lalli
- Pa Pa Pandu
