= Anu (film) =

- Theatrical film poster
- Directed by: Shivaganapathi
- Story by: Ravi Babu
- Based on: Anasuya (Telugu)(2007) by Ravi Babu
- Produced by: Balu
- Starring: Pooja Gandhi; Rashmi; Balu; Nag Kiran
- Cinematography: Niranjan Babu
- Edited by: Kemparaju, Akshay P Rao
- Music by: Shekar Chandra
- Release date: 9 January 2009
- Country: India
- Language: Kannada

Anu is a 2009 Kannada-language Indian thriller film starring Pooja Gandhi in the lead role. It was directed by Shivaganapathi and produced by Balu. The music was composed by music director Shekar Chandra. It is a remake of the 2007 Telugu film Anasuya, which was directed by Ravi Babu, with Bhoomika Chawla in the lead. The film was released on 9 January 2009.

== Plot ==
Anu is an orphan and a post graduate in criminal psychology. She joins a TV channel as a reporter. She is entrusted with the task of cracking the secrets behind a series of mysterious serial killings involving the collecting of body organs. The killer always leaves a rose at the crime scene as his signature. While the police attempt to keep the matter silent, Anasuya takes up the task of investigating these murders.

In this process, she meets a police task force officer, Anand who is involved with the investigation. One night, she finds a shady figure lurking in the shadows of her house. When her watchman is alerted, the figure disappears. She hurriedly reaches for Joseph, only to find him murdered in the same fashion as the other murders.

From here, Anu tries to find out the murderer and his reasons behind the unexplained murders. After her own investigations, she narrows down the suspect to Govind, a hospital attendant. She is surprised to find him physically challenged when he is brought to the police station for interrogation. She detests his disability and terms it as a sham, but the police don't quite convinced with her claims. Govind attempts to murder Anu in order to clear the hurdle in his scheme of things. In this process, the police surround him, but he escapes after murdering a couple of policemen.

In another such attempt by him, Anu accidentally murders a person while in her self-defense. Unfortunately for her, she gets framed and is arrested. Anand, with whom she considers as a good friend after some verbal fights initially, gets her released on a bond. Again, when there is another attempt to kill her, the police trap him, but, the sequence of events suggest that he committed suicide. When Anu finds him again, everyone dismisses her talk and wonder if she is in a mental trauma.

While she gets fired from her television employer, she does not even find comfort with Anand, who does not believe her. She decides to resolve the mystery and her investigations lead her to a village where Jyothi, a medical college student went into Coma as a result of being unable to bear the mental trauma given / being given to her by Govind, her professor, who fell in love with her on the first day of her entry into the college and believed that they should be married because of their previous birth, It was nothing but the professor's obsessiveness for Jyothi which led him to stalk her.

Her investigation reveals that Jyothi's body organs, according to her will, were donated to those in need. Govind, with a resolve to retrieve all these organs back to her body that he steals from the morgue. After realizing the intentions of Govind, now turned a complete psycho, Anu does a check on the remainder of the organs that were of Jyothi. To her shock, she realizes that Lakshmi's eyes were out of Jyothi's donation.

When Lakshmi is abducted by Govind, Anu finds his location by tracking his phone number. After the ensuing struggle and fightback, with assistance from Anand, Anu kills Govind by putting that place ablazed and closes the case. She is appreciated by her colleagues for her bravery at the end of the movie.

== Cast ==
- Pooja Gandhi as Anu
- Balu as Manja
- Rashmi
- Naga Kiran as Anand
- Ramesh Bhat
- Achyuth Kumar

== Soundtrack ==
The music was composed by Shekar Chandra. The song "Aakasam Merisenu" from the original was reused.

- "Ee Bandha"
- "Rangasaani"

== Reception ==
=== Critical response ===
R G Vijayasarathy of Rediff.com scored the film at 3 out of 5 stars and says "Anu can be enjoyed by the audience, who love thrillers. For Pooja Gandhi, this is certainly a big break. It is time that she chooses films where she can further demonstrate her talent". Bangalore Mirror wrote "Baalu is good as the psychotic killer but shows he is an average actor when he plays the professor. However, for Pooja Gandhi, this turns out to be her career best. A must watch for being unusual and Pooja’s acting".

== Box office ==
Anu performed fairly well at the Sandalwood box office.
