= Guddada Bhootha =

- Genre: Mystery; Thriller
- Written by: Sadananda Suvarna
- Directed by: Sadananda Suvarna
- Creative director: Girish Kasaravalli
- Starring: Prakash Raj
- Country of origin: India
- Original languages: Kannada; Tulu
- No. of seasons: 1
- No. of episodes: 13

Production
- Producer: Sadananda Suvarna
- Cinematography: G.S. Bhaskar
- Editors: M.N. Swami; G.S. Bhaskar

Original release
- Network: DD National (Karnataka Regional Service) or DD1 and Zee Kannada

Guddada Bhootha (1991) is a thriller, Indian Kannada language television mini-series which has a suspense storyline based on a Tulu drama shows the country life of Tulu Nadu region of India. The art and technical direction of the series was done by popular Kannada filmmaker Girish Kasaravalli. It had Prakash Raj as the lead actor. The serial consists of 13 episodes and it was re-telecasted in Zee Kannada in the year 2014. The series was applauded for its advanced technical values during that time.

== Cast ==
- Prakash Raj as Shrinivas
- Kanaka as Rathna
  - Dubbing for Kanaka by Vaishali Kasaravalli
- Udyavara Madhava Acharya, Giriappa, Rathna's father
- Balakrishna Bhat as Angara
- Santhosh Nandanavanam as Ramakrishna, Angara's son.
- Ramdas as Bhojanna

== Production ==
Suvarna initially wanted to make a full-length feature film on the story however the idea was dropped and was made into series. The haunted house featured in the series was shot at journalist Vaddarse Raghurama Shetty's relative's house situated in Saibrakatté, Udupi.

== Soundtrack ==
The lyrics of the title song "Dennana Dennana" were written by the director. The words "Dennana Dennana" in the song were borrowed from the Tulu epic poem of Siri Paadhdhana recited during Bhoota Kola. The song was modified by adding melodic touch which gave it an enduring and goofy feel.

It was sung by B. R. Chaya and Sadananda Suvarna.

The song became popular and was reused in the 2015 film Rangitaranga whose content was similar to the series.

== Home media ==
DVDs of the series were released by the company Total Kannada.
