= Udyavara Madhava Acharya =

Kannada theatre artist and author (1941–2020)

- Born: 25 March 1941; Udupi District, Madras Presidency, British India
- Died: 7 December 2020 (aged 79); Udupi, Karnataka, India
- Occupations: Short story writer, poet, theatre director
- Writing career
- Language: Kannada
- Notable awards: Karnataka Sahitya Academy Award; Rajyotsava Award

Udyavara Madhava Acharya (25 March 1941 – 7 December 2020) was an Indian orator, short story writer, poet, and theatre artist. He is credited with modernisation of the traditional theatre form of Yakshagana. Some of his noted works include Baagida Mara (transl. Bent Tree), Rangasthalada Kanavarikegalu (transl. Theater dreams), and Nenapadalu Shakunthale (transl. I remembered Shakunthala). He was a recipient of the Karnataka state Rajyotsava Award in 1999 and the Karnataka Sahitya Academy Award in 1970.

== Early life ==
Acharya was born on 25 March 1941, in Udupi district, Madras Presidency, British India (now the southern Indian state of Karnataka). His father D. Lakshmi Narayana Acharya was a Sanskrit lecturer in the Madras Presidency. His father was the author of the Sanskrit book, Rasavilasa. His mother, U. Lalita Lakshmi specialised in local arts and was an influence on his uptake of performing arts. During his childhood, Acharya was exposed to arts from the region including Yakshagana, Kola, Nagamandala, and Dhakkebali. After completing his primary education in Kalyanpura, Udupi, he completed his Bachelor of Arts from MGM college in Udupi, and went on to get a Master's degree in Economics from Bangalore University.

== Career ==
Acharya started his career as a professor of economics at Bhandarkar's college in Kundapur between 1965 and 1969, and later at the Poornaprajna college in Udupi, between 1969 and 1996. He would go onto retire as a Principal from the BB College in Kundapur.

He rose to prominence as an author of short stories and dramas in the 1970s when he started Samuha (transl. commonplace) as a theatre group that specialised in dramas and Kannada and Tulu language ballets. The group was noted for staging classical literary works with a combination of folk arts including Yakshagana, Bharatanatyam, and classical music. Along with his theatre groups Sahana and Saketa Kalavidaru, he is credited with modernisation of the South-Indian dance drama form Yakshagana. Some of his experimental and acclaimed theatre works included Shabari (based on Shabari from the Indian epic Ramayana) and Matte Raman Kathe (transl. The story of Rama again). He had directed the dance dramas Urvashi (based on the Apsara Urvashi) and Nenapadalu Shakunthale (transl. I remembered Shakunthala). Specifically, he was noted for his contemporary approach to Yakshagana, drawing the focus to a group formation rather than a solo performance. Though not trained in classical dances, he was noted to have incorporated free style dance forms into his choreography. In addition to performing in India, his theatre group had also performed in the United States.

As a poet he had also written anthologies, with Rangasthalada Kanavarikegalu (transl. Theater dreams), Hu Midi Haadu (transl. Flower songs), and Radhe Emba Gathe (transl. A song called Radha) being popular. His book Paachaya was a recommended course book at the Mangalore University, in the undergraduate arts program. He had also acted in the Kannada television serial Guddada Bhootha. He was also an artist with Akashvani (All India Radio) in Mangalore.

He was the recipient of the Karnataka state Rajyotsava Award in 1999. His short story Baagida Mara (transl. Bent Tree) won the Karnataka Sahitya Academy Award in 1970. He was also a member of the Karnataka Janapada Academy and was a recipient of the Rangavisharada award from Rangabhoomi, Udupi. He led the 4th Kannada Sahitya Sammelana which was held in Udupi.

== Personal life ==
Acharya was married and had three daughters and a son. He died on 7 December 2020 at the Kasturba Medical Hospital, aged 79.

== Literary works ==
Short story collections

- Baagida Mara (Karnataka Sahitya Academy Award, 1970)
- Bhaagadoddammana Kathe
- Nenapemba Navilugari
- Belakinedege
- Nidu Patheyavanu
- Silu Bidirina Sillu
- Hadi: Hattu sanna kathegalu

Essay collections

- Ranga Prabandhagalu
- Nrithya prabandhagalu
- Yaksha Prabandhagalu
- Sahithya Spandana (essays on different literary figures including Pu. Ti. Na, Kuvempu, Karanth, Sediyapu)

Collections of poems

- Rangasthalada Kanavarikegalu
- Hu Midi Hadu (for children)
- Radhe Emba Gathe

Dramas

- Iddakkidanthe Nataka
- Edeyolagana Dipa (a detective story)
- Gode
- Krishnana Solu
- Rani Abbakka Devi (written for Akashavani, Mangalore)

Dance drama scripts

- Kuvara Bhasmasura
- Panchali
- Bhishma Sathyavrithanadaddu
- Stri Shakthi
- Gandhari
- Usha Parinaya
- Stabdha
- Ganga Lahari
- Soundharya Lahari
- Ambe
- Shakuntha Kujana
- Seetheya Svagatha
- Dakshayini
- Hamsanaada

== See also ==
- Kannada literature
