= Jibita o Mrita =

Short story by Rabindranath Tagore

"Jibita o Mrita" (Bengali: জীবিত ও মৃত; English: The Living and The Dead) is a Bengali-language short story written by Rabindranath Tagore in 1892. It is a remarkable short story by Tagore.

== Plot ==
Kadambini is a widow with no child. She has a great bond with her brother-in-law's son. One night, suddenly she dies. The four Brahmins take her for ritual cremation. But she regains her life back and walks out. She does not go to her home as she thinks herself a ghost. With the help of a man, she comes to her friend Jogamaya's home. But she leads an uneasy life and so she has to leave the company of Jogamaya. She returns at her own in-laws home. But the family members do not take her as a living being. At last, after committing suicide, she proved that she was alive.

== Analysis ==
The story combines the two unique forms of literature: the supernatural tale and the ironic parable. But it is not a perfect supernatural story. The existence of Kadambini is supernatural. It depicts the idea of being stuck between life and death. In short, it deals with the mystery of death. The punch line of the story is "Kadambini moriya praman korilo, she more nai" (By dying, Kadambini proved that she did not die).

== Screen adaptation ==
Year	Title	Language	Ref.
1995	Kadambini	Hindi	
