= Mailara Jaatre =

Fair in Karnataka, India

The Mylar Jaatre' is the biggest fair in the Indian state of Karnataka and one of the biggest in South India. More than 10 lakh devotees from across the State and neighbouring States congregate at Mylara, a pilgrim centre for the annual Karnikotsava (prophecy). The fair is celebrated annually at the temple dedicated to Shiva in his form as Mailareshwara, the patron deity of the Kuruba Gowda community. Mylara is situated in the south-western corner of Hadagali taluk. It is believed that every year at Bharat Hunnime (the full moon in February), Elukoti with his wife Gangamalavva riding on a white horse visit this place. People experience thunder and lightning upon arrival of the God. This God is believed to be fond of his bhaktas and would be pleased with naivedya made of banana, sugar, ghee, and milk mixed together.

It is believed that an avatar of Shiva gave Elu Koti (7 crore) rupees to Venkateshwara for his marriage, but never returned. Shiva became furious and people calmed him by calling him Elukoti.
