= Vasanthakala =

2008 film by Vaddanahalli Srinivas

- Directed by: Vaddanahalli Srinivas
- Written by: Vaddanahalli Srinivas
- Produced by: M Krishna
- Starring: Naga Kiran; Hariprriya
- Cinematography: Venus Murthy
- Edited by: K Eshwar
- Music by: V. Manohar
- Production company: Parvathi Parameshwara Combines
- Release date: June 27, 2008
- Running time: 140 minutes
- Country: India
- Language: Kannada

Vasanthakala is a 2008 Indian Kannada-language romantic action film written and directed by Vaddanahalli Srinivas making his debut. The film is produced by M Krishna under the banner Parvathi Parameshwara Combines. It features Naga Kiran and Hariprriya in the lead roles. The supporting cast includes Sudhakar, Rangayana Raghu, Sharan and Umashree. The score and soundtrack for the film is by V. Manohar and the cinematography is by Venus Murthy.

== Cast ==
- Naga Kiran as Abhi
- Hariprriya as Meghana
- Sudhakar as Harsha
- Rangayana Raghu
- Sharan
- Umashree
- Padma Vasanthi
- Latha

== Soundtrack ==
Vasanthakala

Soundtrack album by V. Manohar
- Genre: Feature film soundtrack
- Language: Kannada
- Label: Annapurneshwari Audio
- Producer: M Krishna

The film's background score and the soundtracks are composed by V. Manohar. The music rights were acquired by Annapurneshwari Audio.

Tracklist
No.	Title	Lyrics	Singer(s)	Length
1.	"Hodallella"	V. Manohar	Vidhu Prathap
2.	"Modala Baari"	Kaviraj	Hemanth (singer)
3.	"Pucca Local Seizer"	Vaddanahalli Srinivas	Vidhu Prathap
4.	"Unlimited"	V. Manohar	Sangeetha Katti, Fayaz Khan
5.	"One & Only Iva Ekangi"	Vaddanahalli Srinivas	Ramesh Chandra
6.	Untitled	Kaviraj	Ajay Warrior, Nanditha

== Reception ==
=== Critical response ===
A critic from Sify.com wrote "Debutant director Srinivasa Vaddanahalli has not worked on the script keeping the current trends in mind. There are many such subjects of love sacrifice and he has not able to catch the novelty in scenes. The only saving grace is good acting attempt by Haripriya and Nagkiran".
