= Nagamandala =

- Directed by: T. S. Nagabharana
- Written by: Girish Karnad
- Produced by: Srihari L. Khoday
- Starring: Prakash Raj; Vijayalakshmi; Mandya Ramesh; B. Jayashree; Vanitha Vasu
- Cinematography: G.S. Bhaskar
- Music by: C. Ashwath
- Release date: 1997
- Country: India
- Language: Kannada

Nagamandala (lit. 'Nāga Mandala'; transl. Serpent Ritual) is a 1997 Indian Kannada-language drama film, directed by T. S. Nagabharana and written by Girish Karnad. Produced by Srihari L. Khoday with music by C. Aswath, it is an adaptation of a 1988 play by Karnad with the same name which is based on a local folk tale and ritual. It stars Prakash Raj and Vijayalakshmi in the lead roles. The film depicts a romantic plot between a woman and a snake in the disguise of her uncaring husband.

The film, upon release, went on to win many prestigious awards for its content and screen adaptation. The soundtrack, consisting of 15 tracks, tuned by C. Ashwath became very popular for the folksy touch. Vijayalakshmi won Filmfare Award for Best Actress – Kannada for her performance in this film.

Karnad's play has been compared with Vijaydan Detha's 1970s Rajasthani folkloric short story Duvidha which has a similar plotline and has also been cited as a source for this film. Detha's story was adapted into a 1973 film with the same name, which was later remade into the 2005 film Paheli (reportedly also inspired by this film).

It was selected for the Indian Panorama section at the 28th International Film Festival of India in 1997.

== Plot ==
The movie begins with Kurudamma (blind woman) and her son Kappanna visiting her nephew for a Devi festival. There she sees her beautiful daughter Rani. Her nephew asks her to find a suitable match for Rani. Kurudamma feels Appanna as a perfect match for Rani and pesters him regularly for consenting to marry Rani. Finally Appanna gives in and marries Rani.

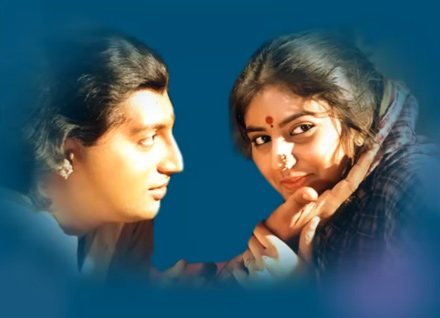
A still from the film. Prakash Raj (left) and Vijayalakshmi (right)

On their first night at Rani's maternal home, a timid Rani is taken aback by lusty & overbearing husband, she sleeps in a corner of the room. They return to Appanna's village where Rani confides her fear to Kurudamma who convinces Rani to win him over by teasing & playfulness. However, that night she is again overcome by fear and locks herself in the pooja room. Appanna scolds her and leaves the house and heads to Chelvi, a prostitute's house.

Next day, Kurudamma comes there and realizes that Rani is locked. She gives Rani a small root & asks her to mix it with milk and give it to Appanna so that the couple can consummate their marriage. Next day she does so but Appanna falls unconscious only to regain consciousness after a minute and leaves the house as usual. Again Kurudamma comes there and learns of Rani's failure and gives her a bigger root this time.

Rani tries to drug the milk, but it catches fire and Appanna arrives home at the same time and goes to bathe as usual. A terrified Rani pours it under a tree which drains into an anthill under the tree. On seeing this, Rani is further scared and returns home. Apparently the snake would have consumed the milk and it comes to her bed that night. The snake then assumes the form of Appanna. It then talks her out and consoles her. It sleeps her on his lap and wins over her affection. The next morning the snake is gone & the real Appanna comes in and is surprised to see a cheerful Rani and scolds her. Rani is perplexed by this. At night, a melancholic Rani is waiting near the door for Appanna and the snake again arrives in Appanna's form. They consummate their union that night. Next morning, the snake is gone as usual & Appanna arrives only to see a half naked Rani lying in bed with all the clothes & flowers lying around, as if after the marriage night. A suspicious Appanna tells about this in his gym. His teacher volunteers to keep a watch at Appanna's house that night and is killed by the snake which used to take the form of Appanna while he was doing so.

The next day Appanna and his friends are shocked to see their teacher dead. Next morning after the gym session Appanna arrives home and sees Rani lying half naked in bed. This continues for a few days. One night he decides to keep watch of the door himself. That night the snake waits for him to leave. A frustrated Appanna upon waiting too long leaves to Chelvi's house. Meanwhile, Rani realizes that she is pregnant. The snake comes back to Rani in Appanna's form and learns of her pregnancy and asks her to keep it a secret and not talk about it in the morning.

After a couple of days, Kurudamma and Kappanna learns of the pregnancy and rush to the gym to congratulate Appanna. A furious Appanna beats Rani asking her who the father is, also denies having slept with Rani. The elders pacify him and decides to call for a panchayat session that evening to investigate. During the panchayat investigation, some people in the crowd demand a severe test - 'Naga divya' - holding a snake in the hand and swearing by the truth. Rani agrees to it and picks up a snake in the anthill.This snake happens to be the very snake which impregnated Rani. Thus Rani escapes unhurt and the village adores her.

Meanwhile, Appanna is frustrated and goes away from Chelvi.That night the snake appears as Appanna and is confronted by Rani in her house. Meanwhile, the real Appanna arrives there unseen by Rani. The snake realizes this and sends Rani to fetch milk. It takes its form and slithers away through the window. Appanna sees this and realizes that the snake had taken his form and was sleeping with Rani all these days. He goes to the anthill where the snake appears in Appanna's form and a fight ensues. When the snake is about to kill Appanna, the former realizes that Rani's love has eliminated all the poison in him and spares the latter. Appanna however beats the snake and throws him into the fire. The snake assumes his real form and dies.

After a few months, Appanna is a changed man who loves his wife. He is shown taking his heavily pregnant wife to a fair.

== Cast ==
- Prakash Raj as Appanna; and Naga, a cobra who can assume the form of a human being
- Vijayalakshmi as Rani, Appanna's wife
- Mandya Ramesh as Kappanna
- B. Jayashree as Kurudavva
- Vanitha Vasu as Chelvi

== Themes ==
Nagamandala is a movie based on folk tales spread in North Karnataka, India. The movie portrays lifestyle, food habits, and routine habits of medieval period in Karnataka. Snakes are considered sacred and are feared and worshipped. North Karnataka dialect is used for conversation. Supernatural elements play a central part in the film.

The film uses a magical folktale to reveal the complexity of human life. In particular, the film focuses on the folktale in the Indian context to reveal the social and individual relations. Some of the most complex issues dealt in the movie reflect the prevailing social stigmas of those times.

The film deals with intimate relationships between a man and a woman, and an Indian woman's desperation to win the affections of her husband in spite of the husband's open infidelity. It also touches on the imposition to prove fidelity on married women while their husbands are not questioned about their extramarital affairs, and the village judicial system.

== Soundtrack ==
The music of the film was composed by C. Ashwath. All the 16 songs composed for this film have been written by Gopal Vajpeyi ( credited as Gopal Yagnik). The songs are rendered by popular Sugama Sangeetha singers.

Kannada Track listing
No.	Title	Lyrics	Singer(s)	Length
1.	"Ee Hasiru Siriyali"	Gopal Yagnik	Sangeetha Katti
2.	"Kambada Myalina Bombeye"	Gopal Yagnik	Sangeetha Katti
3.	"Hudugi Hoo Hudugi"	Gopal Yagnik	Rathnamala Prakash
4.	"Intha Cheluvige"	Gopal Yagnik	Shivanand Patil
5.	"Gediya Beku Magala"	Gopal Yagnik	Rathnamala Prakash
6.	"Chikkiyanthaki"	Gopal Yagnik	Shivanand Patil
7.	"Gavvana Devvada"	Gopal Yagnik	C. Ashwath
8.	"Maguve Nanna Naguve"	Gopal Yagnik	C. Ashwath
9.	"Jodu Haasige"	Gopal Yagnik	C. Ashwath
10.	"Odedoda Manasu Koodi"	Gopal Yagnik	C. Ashwath
11.	"Koncha Kodari Gamana"	Gopal Yagnik	Chorus
12.	"Enidu Hosa Hurupu"	Gopal Yagnik	Chorus
13.	"Mayada Manada Bhara"	Gopal Yagnik	Chorus
14.	"Danidana Nanna Dori"	Gopal Yagnik	Chorus
15.	"Ekanthadolu Koothu"	Gopal Yagnik	Chorus
16.	"Sathyulla Sheelavathige"	Gopal Yagnik	Chorus

In Telugu it released as Naga Vamsam. All lyrics were written by Bharathi Babu.

Telugu Track Listing
No.	Title	Singer(s)	Length
1.	"E Kaluvaku"	Mano Radhika
2.	"Vinavamma Jabilamma"	S.P. Sailaja
3.	"Sambarala Pongule"	S.P. Sailaja
4.	"Andaala Naaraja"	S.P. Sailaja
5.	"Ennallikennalu"	S.P. Sailaja
6.	"Cheekati Jaadala"	Mano
7.	"Thanu Maimarachindeya"	Mano
8.	"Emito Ee Vintha"	Mano
9.	"Inave Bamma Mata"	Lalitha Sagari
10.	"Malli Sirimalli"	Lalitha Sagari
11.	"Bandi Ayinava"	Mano, Lalitha Sagari

== Awards ==
Karnataka State Film Awards

- Second Best Film — Srihari L. Khoday
- Best Supporting Actor — Mandya Ramesh
- Best Supporting Actress — B. Jayashree
- Best Art Direction — Shashidhar Adapa
- Best Cinematographer — G.S. Bhaskar

Udaya Cine Awards

- Best Film — Srihari L. Khoday
- Best Direction — T. S. Nagabharana
- Best Supporting Actor — Mandya Ramesh
- Best Supporting Actress — B. Jayashri
- Best Female Playback Singer — Sangeetha Katti

Aryabhata Film Awards

- First Best Film — Srihari L. Khoday
- Best Actor — Prakash Raj
- Best Actress — Vijayalakshmi
- Best Supporting Actress — B. Jayashree
- Best Director — T. S. Nagabharana
- Best Cameraman — G.S. Bhaskar
- Best Upcoming Actor — Mandya Ramesh

Other awards

- Selected for Indian Panorama at the 1997 International Film Festival of India
- Filmfare Award for Best Director – Kannada — T. S. Nagabharana
- Cine Express Best Director Award — T. S. Nagabharana
- Film Fans Association Award

== External sources ==
- Nagamandala at IMDb
- Performance of the play Nagamandala, India International Centre, 2007
