= Male Barali Manju Irali =

2009 film by Vijayalakshmi Singh

- Directed by: Vijayalakshmi Singh
- Written by: B. A. Madhu
- Produced by: Jai Jagadish
- Starring: Srinagar Kitty; Parvathy Thiruvothu; Naga Kiran
- Cinematography: Ajay Vincent
- Edited by: B S Kemparaju
- Music by: Mano Murthy
- Production company: Dakshat Combines
- Release date: 31 July 2009
- Running time: 146 minutes
- Country: India
- Language: Kannada

Male Barali Manju Irali (transl. Let the Rain Come, and the Mist Remain) is a 2009 Kannada-language drama film directed by Vijayalakshmi Singh. It stars Srinagar Kitty, Parvathy Thiruvothu, and Naga Kiran in the lead roles. The movie draws inspiration from the 1995 Sydney Pollack film Sabrina (1995 film) starring Harrison Ford, Julia Ormond, and Greg Kinnear. The film opened to positive reviews in July 2009.

== Cast ==
- Srinagar Kitty as Vishwas
- Parvathy Thiruvothu as Sneha
- Naga Kiran as Prem
- Haripriya as Nayana
- Hema Chaudhary
- Jai Jagadish
- Mukhyamantri Chandru
- Umashree
- Sharan
- Sadhu Kokila

== Production ==
Filming began during August 2008 and the film was shot for several months at a cost of 2.5 crore rupees. It was the first ever Kannada film to have been launched in the Kodagu district, which also served as the film's backdrop throughout the shoot. The shoot of the film was completed during May 2009, with Parvathy revealed to have helped work on the script of the film.

== Soundtrack ==
Male Barali Manju Irali

Soundtrack album by Mano Murthy
- Released: May 10, 2009
- Genre: Feature film soundtrack
- Length: 31:11
- Label: Anand Audio
- Producer: Mano Murthy

Mano Murthy chronology
Olave Jeevana Lekkachaara (2009)	Male Barali Manju Irali (2009)	Manasaare (2009)

No.	Title	Singer(s)	Length
1.	"Ondu Ninna"	Shreya Ghoshal	4:52
2.	"Gelathi Neenu Iruvaga"	Sonu Nigam, Shreya Ghoshal	4:36
3.	"Yenu Agide Ninage"	Tippu, Supriya Lohith	4:19
4.	"Vidayada Veleyalli"	KK	4:42
5.	"Ondusala Ondondu Sala"	Kunal Ganjawala	4:42
6.	"Vijayambike"	Manasi Prasad	1:30
7.	"Male Barali Manju Irali"	Alok, Inchara Rao	2:22
8.	"Jaga Jagiso"	Keshava Prasad, Mahalakshmi Iyer	4:16
Total length:			31:11

== Reception ==
=== Critical response ===
R. G. Vijayasarathy of Rediff.com scored the film at 4 out of 5 stars, stating: "When most of the big Kannada stars are focusing on remakes, it is nice to see an original film like this made with lesser known stars. The success of the film will prove that the future of the Kannada film industry lies in original creation and not in copying. Male Barali Manju Irali is a film that you should not miss". A critic from The New Indian Express wrote "Over all "Male Barali Manju Irali" is an enjoyable fare, which could be appreciated for its narrative, direction and high voltage performances". A critic from Bangalore Mirror wrote "Considerable care has been taken by the director to present an authentic setting for the emotional scenes which is ably aided by good camerawork. But unnecessary songs and some boring scenes keeps [sic] the film at a dull pace. Only Parvathy['s] performance can bring in the crowds for this film".
