= Singaravva =

- Directed by: T. S. Nagabharana
- Written by: Chandrashekhara Kambara
- Screenplay by: Kotiganahalli Ramaiah; T. S. Nagabharana
- Based on: Singaravva Mattu Aramane by Chandrashekhara Kambara
- Produced by: Sandesh Nagaraj
- Starring: Prema; Avinash
- Cinematography: B. C. Gowrishankar
- Edited by: P. R. Soundar Raj
- Music by: C. Aswath
- Release date: 18 April 2003
- Running time: 142 minutes
- Country: India
- Language: Kannada

Singaravva is 2003 Indian Kannada language film directed by T. S. Nagabharana, based on the novel Singaravva Mattu Aramane by Chandrashekhara Kambara, and starring Prema and Avinash.

At the 50th National Film Awards, the film was awarded the Best Feature Film in Kannada.

== Cast ==
- Prema as Singaaravva a.k.a. Singari
- Avinash
- Akhila
- Shivadhwaj
- Sharath Lohitashwa
- Enagi Nataraj
- Laxmidevi Enagi
- Rangayana Raghu

== Reception ==
Leslie Felperin of Variety wrote that " Less song-led than Bollywood pics, this regional production focuses more on story. Perf[ormance]s are broad, typical of Indian cinema, with lively lensing from B.C. Gowrishankar".

== Awards ==
- National Film Awards-2002 - Best Feature Film in Kannada
- Karnataka State Film Awards 2002-03 - Best Art Director – Shashidhar Adapa
