= Koragajja =

Indian upcoming film

- Directed by: Sudheer Attavar
- Written by: Sudheer Attavar
- Produced by: Trivikram Sapalya
- Starring: Kabir Bedi; Bhavya; Shruthi
- Music by: Gopi Sundar
- Production companies: Trivikram Cinemas; Success Films
- Country: India
- Language: Kannada

Koragajja is an upcoming Indian multilingual period action-drama film directed by Karnataka Sahitya Academy Award-winner Sudheer Attavar. The film is produced by Trivikram sapalya under the baner of Trivikram Cinemas, and Success Films. The film stars Kabir Bedi, Bhavya, Sandip Soparkar, and Shruthi as lead characters. The music composer of the film is Gopi Sundar.

== Plot ==
The story, set around 800 years ago, is based on an in-depth study of how Taniya, a tribal youth from the 12th century, attained divinity and became Koragajja.

== Cast ==
- Kabir Bedi as Udyavara Arasu
- Bhavya as Panjandai
- Sandip Soparrkar
- Shruthi as Bhairakke

== Music ==
Gopi Sundar is the music director of Koragajja under Zee Music.

No.	Title	Singer(s)	Length
1.	"Gaali Gandha / Gana Gunjar"	Armaan Malik, Shreya Ghoshal
2.	"Tellanti Tellanti / Gilori Gilori"	Swaroop Khan, Anila Rajeev, Sharon Prabhakar
