= Daughters of This Century =

1995 Indian film by Tapan Sinha

- Poster of the film
- Directed by: Tapan Sinha
- Starring: Shabana Azmi; Jaya Bachchan; Madhuri Dixit; Pallavi Joshi; Deepa Sahi; Nandita Das; Sulabha Deshpande; Gyanesh Mukherjee; Debashree Roy; Mamata Shankar; Pankaj Kapoor; Milind Gunaji; Kaushik Sen; Jeet
- Cinematography: Soumendu Roy
- Edited by: Subodh Roy
- Production company: Shunya Media
- Release date: 1995
- Running time: 180 minutes
- Country: India
- Language: Hindi

Daughters of This Century is a 1995 Indian Hindi anthology film directed by Tapan Sinha. The film is composed of six segments. The fourth is based on the Bengali novel Ei Daho (1961) by Gour Kishore Ghosh, and each of the rest is based on a Bengali short story — Jibita o Mrita (1904) by Rabindranath Tagore, Abhagir Swarga (1918) by Sarat Chandra Chattopadhyay, Satgharia (1976) by Prafulla Roy, Kaanch (1984) by Dibyendu Palit and the last one by Tarasankar Bandyopadhyay. Each segment runs for 30 minutes. The film delves into the plight of Indian women in the 20th century. It stars Shabana Azmi, Jaya Bachchan, Madhuri Dixit, Pallavi Joshi, Deepa Sahi, Nandita Das, Sulabha Deshpande, Gyanesh Mukherjee, Debashree Roy, Mamata Shankar, Pankaj Kapoor, Milind Gunaji, Kaushik Sen and Jeet.

Despite an ensemble cast, the film was a critical and commercial failure. Most of the critics stated that Sinha failed to weave a strong screenplay. The performance of the cast was well-appreciated. It was screened at 28th International Film Festival of India held in Thiruvananthapuram, in 1997. At the Cairo International Film Festival in 2001, the film was screened without the last segment featuring Madhuri Dixit, because of time-constraint, and was nominated for Golden Pyramid Award.

== Plot ==
| No. | Title | Based on |
|---|---|---|
| 1 | "Kadambini" | Jibita o Mrita by Rabindranath Tagore |
Kadambini, the widowed sister-in-law of Shardashankar, the landlord of Ranihat is very affectionate towards his son Manik. After her sudden demise caused cardiac arrest, she is taken away by four brahmins, for cremation. While the men leave to procure firewood for her crematory rituals, she recovers. Anyway, she believes herself to be a preta and, instead of returning to her own house, goes to her childhood friend Yogmaya's place at Nishchindapur. After Kadambini's stay for months long, Yogmaya's husband Sripati assumes that she has probably escaped the torment caused by her family members. He goes to Ranihat to meet Shardashankar. When he returns he tells his wife to her discontent that she has mistaken another woman for Kadambini as he has been informed that Kadambini has passed away. When Kadambini comes to know that she is the reason for the verbal dispute between Yogmaya and Sripati, she leaves and returns Ranihat to meet Manik. Despite Kadambini's assertion that she is alive, and not a spectre, her family members are terrified and Shardashankar requests her to leave. Kadambini, finally, jumps into the pool to prove that she was not dead.
| 2 | "Abhaagi" | Abhagir Swarga (1918) by Sarat Chandra Chattopadhyay |
Abhaagi, an impoverished dalit woman long-abandoned by her husband Rasik Dule, is on her deathbed. She asks her son Kangali to call Rasik as she intends to receive his blessing before she dies. After Rasik comes, she receives his blessing and passes away. When Rasik attempts to cut a tree to cremate his deceased wife, he is interrupted and beaten by a footman of the landlord. Kangali visits the landlord's gomastha to seek permission to cut the tree, but is refused. He then visits Thakurdas Mukhujje to seek some pyres but is refused again. A weeping Kangali, finally, buries Abhaagi's corpse in the bank of the river.
| 3 | "Champia" | Satgharia (1976) by Prafulla Roy |
Champia, a forty year-old dalit woman comes to Surathpura to get hired as a farm labourer. If she can secure her job, Natowar who is a labourer under a contractor in Bhakilganj, will marry her. Earlier, she came to Surathpura for six times. Each time, she successfully secured her job and married a man to settle there. Anyway, all her earlier six marriages ended. At present, she meets Gaibinath who also expects to be hired by some farmer. Unfortunately, both of them are rejected. Having failed to secure her job, Champiya is rejected by Natowar also. She then marries Gaibinath and returns to Manpathal, her native village.
| 4 | "Charu" | Ei Daho (1961) by Gour Kishore Ghosh |
Golak is a painter who is in love with Charu, his maid who does not believe in love shown by men as she believes that men are predominantly lecherous by nature. Golak proposes Charu to marry him. She takes time to introspect over his proposal. Manorama, Golak's former love interest visits him and proposes to marry him. When Charu arrives, she spots Golak and Manorama making love to each other. This shatters her faith and she leaves after stating that she does not intend to continue her job at his place any longer. Golak is, afterwards, summoned to the police station to learn that Charu has killed herself. Out of his guilty conscience, he consumes chloroform to kill himself.
| 5 | "Hemlata" | Kaanch (1984) by Dibyendu Palit |
Hemlata lives with her daughter Rama and her son-in-law Vinod. She has sold her own house on the insistence of her sons Habu, Labu and Pulu. Now she has an impermanent address. Previously, she stayed at Habu's place, and then at Labu's place. Once, after a house party at Rama's place is over, Hemlata erroneously shatters a bottle of Chivas Regal, which infuriates Vinod. When Vinod and Rama have a squabble over this issue, Hemlata decides to leave for Labu's place. Next morning, Rama informs Hemlata that Labu would come in the afternoon to escort her away. Hemlata says that she would prefer leave immediately with Rama's personal driver Vishwanath, to which Rama agrees. She further asks Rama if she has properly disposed of the broken glass. Rama tells her not to bother about this indicating that she has disposed of the broken glass. While leaving, she halts for a moment as she is pricked by a broken bit of glass. When Rama enquires, she tells nothing but that she should have been more careful while disposing of the broken bits of the glass.

== Cast ==
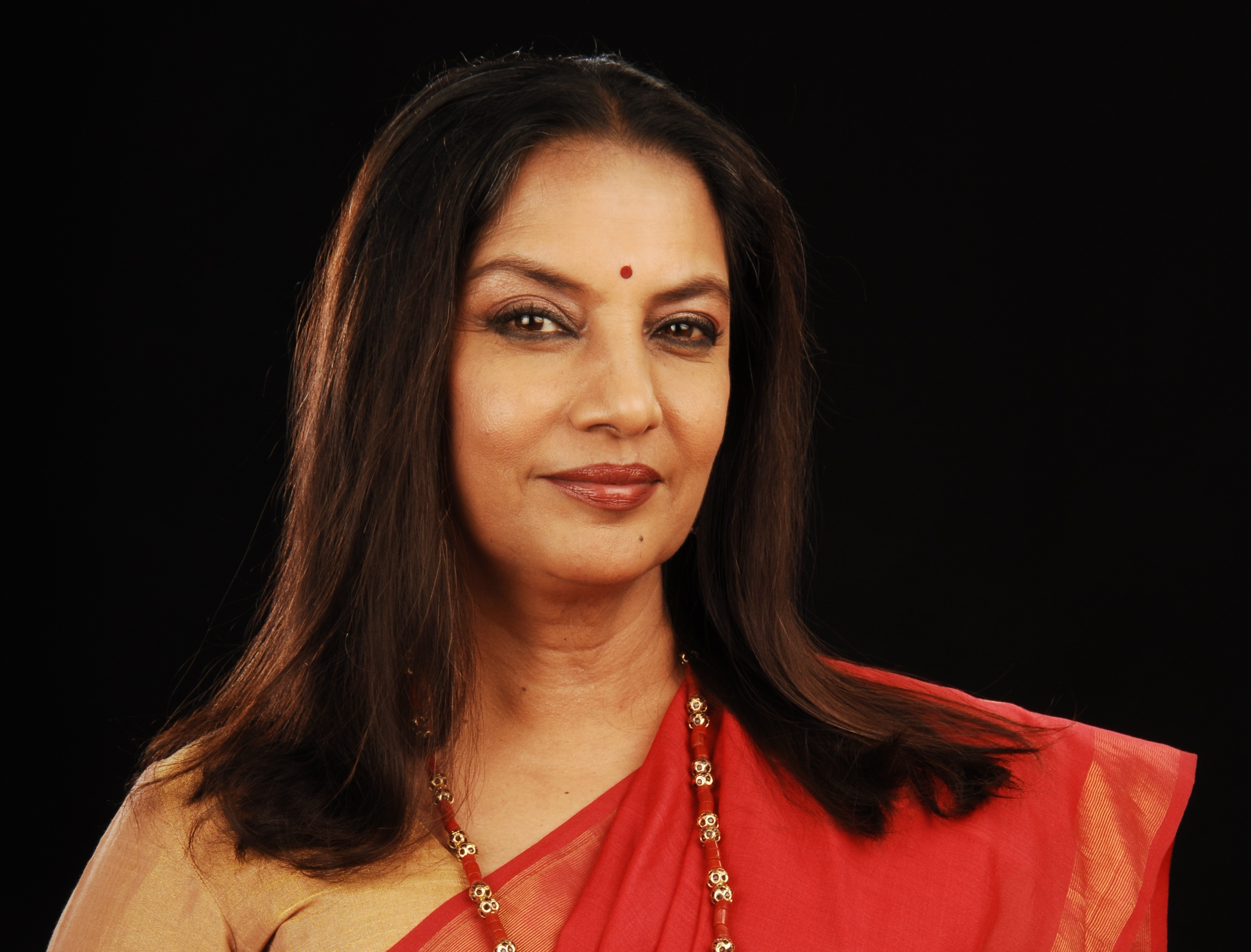
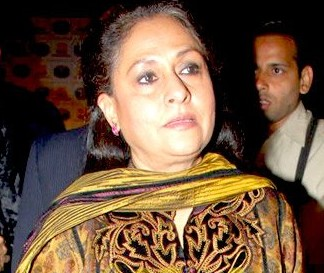
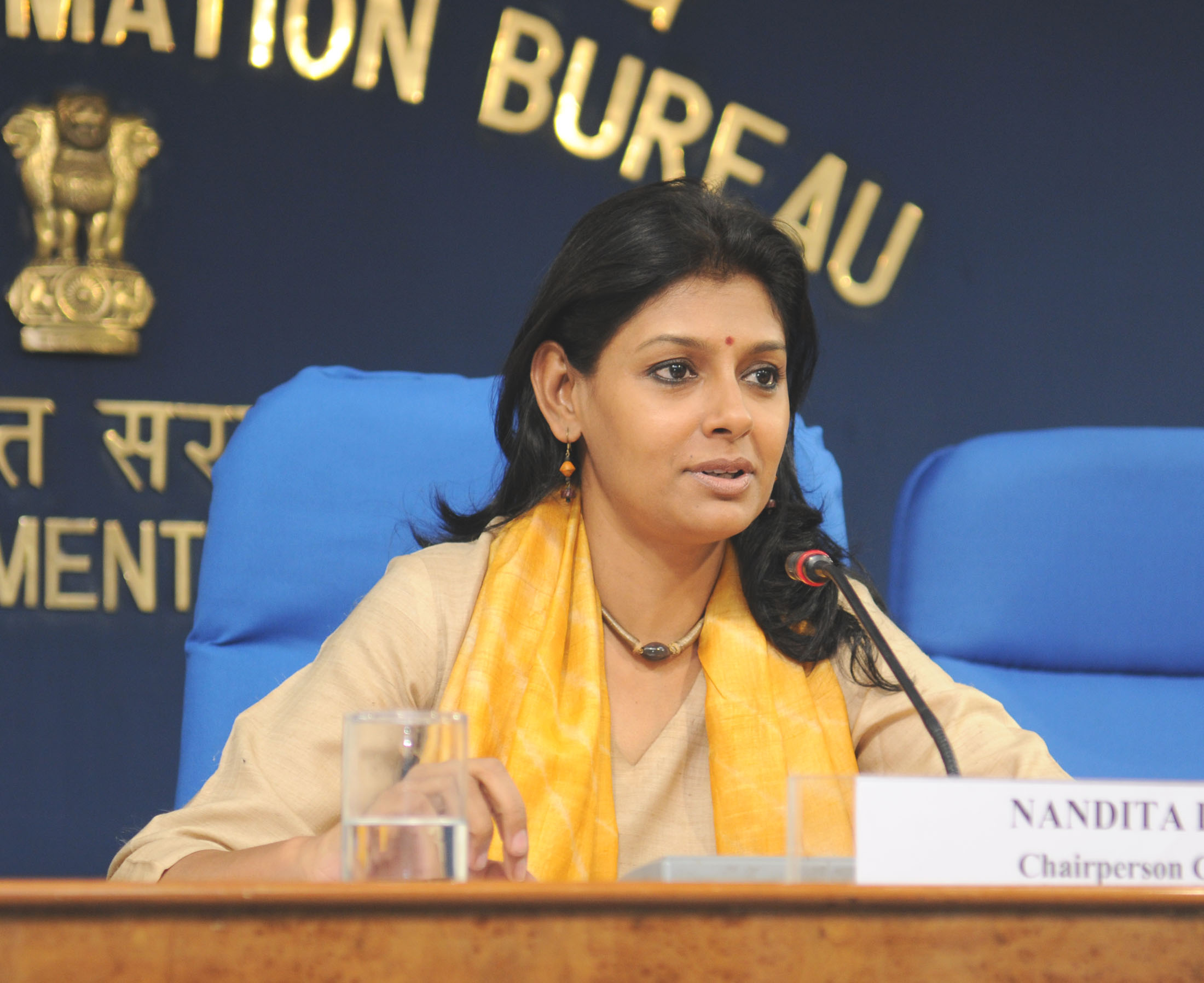
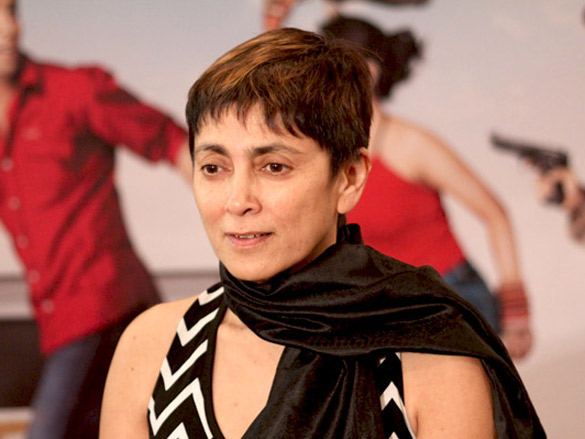
Clockwise: Shabana Azmi portrays Kadambini who recovers from death but is regarded a spectre by her family members. Jaya Bachchan portrays Abhaagi who longs to visit heaven after she dies. Deepa Sahi portrays Champiya who longs for marital security. Nandita Das portrays Charu who kills herself to evade the pain caused by infidelity of her love interest.
- Shabana Azmi as Kadambini
- Jaya Bachchan as Abhaagi
- Madhuri Dixit
- Pallavi Joshi
- Deepa Sahi as Champia
- Nandita Das as Charu
- Sulabha Deshpande as Hemlata
- Gyanesh Mukherjee (Note: Gyanesh Mukherjee features in Champia.)
- Debashree Roy as Manorama, the former love-interest of Golak/ Rama, Hemlata's daughter (Note: Debashree Roy features in Charu and Hemlata segments.)
- Mamata Shankar
- Pankaj Kapoor
- Milind Gunaji as Golak
- Amit Banerjee
- Kaushik Sen
- Jeet (Note: Jeet features in Kadambini and Champia segments.) (Cameo)
- Sudip Mukherjee
- Prem Prakash Modi
- Arjun Chakraborty as Vinod, Rama's husband and Hemlata's son-in-law (Note: Arjun Chakraborty features in Kadambini and Hemlata segments.)
- Papiya Sen as Yogmaya
- Rita Koiral
- Amit Banerjee
- Joy Badlani

== Reception ==
The film received positive reviews for the performance of the cast, but negative reviews followed for Sinha's weak screenplay. Outlook wrote, "All the characters ignite sparks through their bright performances but fail to start the fire. In the end, the viewer feels let down by Sinha". Monish Kumar Das of Upperstall.com describes the film to be "a strong statement depicting the neglect and abuse Indian women have faced throughout the 20th century."

== Accolades ==
| Year | Title | Category | Result | Ref. |
|---|---|---|---|---|
| 2001 | Golden Pyramid Award | Best film | Nominated | |

== Bibliography ==
- Sahara India (1996). Rashtriya Sahara. Sahara India Mass Communication.
- Jane Sloan (26 March 2007). Reel Women: An International Directory of Contemporary Feature Films about Women. Bloomsbury Publishing PLC. ISBN 978-1-4616-7082-7.
- Bibekananda Roy (2005). Conscience of the Race. Publications Division Ministry of Information & Broadcasting. ISBN 9788123026619.
- Shri Krishnan Rai, Anugamini Rai (5 October 2015). Adaptations: Some Journeys from Words to Visuals. Cambridge Scholars Publishing. ISBN 978-1-4438-8409-9.
