= Kanneshwara Rama =

- Theatrical release poster
- Directed by: M. S. Sathyu
- Written by: S. K. Nadig
- Based on: Kannayya Rama by S. K. Nadig
- Produced by: Moola Brothers
- Starring: Anant Nag; Shabana Azmi; Amol Palekar
- Cinematography: Ishan Arya; Ashok Gunjal
- Edited by: S. Chakravarthy
- Music by: B. V. Karanth
- Production company: Sharadha Movie Productions
- Release date: 1977
- Running time: 118 minutes
- Country: India
- Language: Kannada

Kanneshwara Rama (transl. The Legendary Outlaw) is a 1977 Kannada-language political film directed by M. S. Sathyu. The film features an ensemble cast including Anant Nag, Shabana Azmi, Amol Palekar, B. V. Karanth and Shimoga Venkatesh. The film is based on the novel Kannayya Rama written by S. K. Nadig. The film is set in the 1920s during which a rebellious youth, Kanneshwara Rama, who opposes the unjust orders given by the village head and becomes outlawed from the village.

The film was produced by the Moola Brothers under the production company Sharadha Movie Productions. The film is based on the novel Kannayya Rama written by S. K. Nadig. The screenplay of the film was also written by S. K. Nadig. The cinematography of the film was done by Ishan Arya and Ashok Gunjal, while the editing was handled by S. Chakravarthy. The music for the film was composed by B. V. Karanth, while the lyrics were written by N. Kulkarni. This film features the debut of Shabana Azmi in Kannada cinema. The film is Sathyu's second feature film after the 1973 film Garm Hava.

Kanneshwara Rama premiered at the International Film Festival of India. The film was theatrically released on 30 March 1989 and was a critical and box office success, completing a 100-day run in theatres. It was screened in many national and international film festivals, including the Bengaluru International Film Festival in 2017. The film has drawn comparisons to Garm Hava.

== Plot ==
Present day

The film starts with Kanneshwara Rama, a long-sought-after fugitive who has been caught by the police. He is being paraded through the streets of Shimoga before being taken to the state capital for his execution. On the way, Rama sees many people in the crowd who have figured in his life at one point or another and starts thinking about those events.

Flashback

Back in his old days, Rama was a hot-headed peasant who fumed at the slightest attempt at intimidation. He despised meekness and that is one of the reasons for his contempt towards his docile wife. Rama defied the village head, resulting in a midnight scuffle in which he ended up killing the person. He is caught and sent to jail.

In prison, Rama meets Mahatma Gandhi’s followers who are political prisoners. Under the cover of a nationalistic disturbance, he escapes from the place and joins a group of bandits. The leader of the group is Junja, who zealously guards his gang's hoard of gold, watched over by Malli, his mistress. Junja gets fond of Rama, something that is resented by some members of the gang, except Chennira who becomes his ally.

Junja is mortally wounded in an encounter with the police and names Rama as his successor. Malli quietly decamps with the hoarded treasure in the dark of night. Rama becomes notorious as an outrageously bold dacoit. He helps the poor, providing a dowry for girls of marriageable age and breaking the hold of feudal landlords in the area. He becomes a hero in the eyes of the people, attaining a status akin to Robinhood.

He raids a landlord's safe and accidentally finds refuge in Malli's house. She is now a high-priced prostitute and they become lovers. However, Rama finds an opportunity to steal her jewels and does not hesitate.

Rama's daring exploits, his growing popularity, and his successes begin to worry the government. The tension with the police reaches its peak when he rescues a group of nationalists from the police, takes the policemen captive, and humiliates the British Captain. He is both amused and impressed by Gandhi's policy of non-violence, but what catches his attention is their building of a cause and the symbolic flag, an idea that started to germinate in his mind.

Some members of Rama's gang are disloyal to him. He out-maneuvers them in their break-away attempt to rob an armed treasury and forgives the culprits, against Chennira's advice. However, Rama begins to wonder whether any group can be loyal to an individual for long. He feels that the guiding principle should be an idea, symbolized by a flag and a base, both of which are necessary. He frees a village from the bondage of a religious order, adopts it, and places his flag on an old fort that guards it. Rama becomes a legend, carving out an independent principality of his own. Rama becomes a legend in his own lifetime. Ballad singers compose songs praising his courage and the police are afraid of him.

The British Government is alarmed. The District Collector sends a large force to capture Rama at any cost. The Police Superintendent first tries to cajole Malli into giving him away but she refuses to do their bidding. He then threatens the people in the village and takes some hostages. The police offensive against Rama is intensified. At an encounter, most of his gang is killed, including the trusted Chennira. Rama runs to his villagers for refuge but they are too scared to help him. Enraged, he sets the village on fire. Even Malli is not able to deter him. The Police Superintendent tries to make Malli help him again. At first, she refuses but when the relatives of the hostages plead with her, she agrees.

Present day

Rama is now alone and helpless. He abandons his weapons at the altar of a temple and visits Malli at night. A trap is set around her house and as soon as Malli sends a signal, the police surround the area. Malli defends her actions by saying that his vindictiveness drove her to it. He says he had only come to give her his treasures so that they could be given to the villagers as compensation. Malli now regrets her betrayal but it is too late.

== Cast ==
- Anant Nag as Kanneshwara Rama
- Shabana Azmi as Malli
- Amol Palekar as Dacoit Chenneera
- B. V. Karanth as Junja
- Shimoga Venkatesh as Narayanappa
- C. R. Simha as Police officer at Jail
- Tom Alter as British Police officer (Voice dubbed by C.R.Simha)
- Dheerendra Gopal
- Malathi
- Ashok Mandanna
- Shantaram
- Honnayya
- David Horsebaro
- Neelamma
- Ananthalakshmi
- Yashoda Ramaswamy
- Lakshmi Nataraj
- S. Ramaswamy

== Soundtrack ==
The music was composed by B. V. Karanth.

Track listing
No.	Title	Lyrics	Singer(s)	Length
1.	"Naraveera Kanneshwara Rama"	N. Kulkarni	P. B. Srinivas
2.	"Thandenondu Kalavina Mala"	N. Kulkarni	P. B. Srinivas
