= Galige =

Gallige
- Poster
- Directed by: M. S. Sathyu
- Written by: S. Ramaswamy (dialogue); Shama Zaidi (Hindi dialogue); Satish Sehgal (Punjabi dialogue)
- Screenplay by: M. S. Sathyu
- Story by: M. S. Sathyu
- Produced by: NFDC; Doordarshan
- Starring: Shailaja; Amit Rai
- Cinematography: G.S. Bhaskar
- Edited by: Sudhanshu Chakraborty
- Music by: Songs: Mysore Ananthaswamy; Score: Rajeev Taranath
- Release date: 1994
- Running time: 151 minutes
- Country: India
- Language: Kannada

Galige (transl. Twenty-four minutes) is a 1994 Indian Kannada-language drama film directed by M. S. Sathyu and starring Shailaja and Amit Rai. The film takes place during the Khalistan movement in the 1940s.

The film was screened at the Indian Panorama section of the International Film Festival of India in 1996 and the National Gallery of Modern Art, Bangalore on 28 November 2018.

== Plot ==
The film takes place during the 1940s and follows Nithya, a girl from Bangalore, who meets an elderly couple from Northern Karnataka that claim to be her grandparents. Another sub-plot involves a reformed terrorist from the Khalistan movement, who eventually gets into a relationship with Nithya.

== Cast ==
- Shailaja as Nithya
- Amit Rai as Shashwat
- Dandup Sengpo as Toshiro Hosakawa
- G. M. Sadar Joshi
- Manjula Rao
- Venkat Rao
- Shyam Arora
- Mohini Mathur
- Avinash Deshpande
- Adil Rana
- Preet Oberoi

== Reception ==
S. R. Ashok Kumar of The Hindu wrote that "In certain scenes Sailaja's performance is good. The cinematography by G. S. Bhaskar is above average and the music by Late Mysore Ananthaswamy is pleasant". Trisha Gupta of Bangalore Mirror wrote that "All the threads of Galige don’t necessarily come together. The music can feel tacked-on, as can some of the attempts at comedy, and the Punjab segment has the rushed quality of nightmare. The film’s uneven tapestry benefits from being woven of low-intensity conversations, like the Bangalore in which it unfolds".
