= Kubi Matthu Iyala =

- Directed by: Sadanand Suvarna
- Written by: Poornachandra Tejaswi
- Screenplay by: Girish Kasaravalli
- Based on: Kubi Matthu Iyala by Poornachandra Tejaswi
- Produced by: Sadanand Suvarna
- Starring: Charuhasan; Raghubir Yadav; Lalithanjali
- Cinematography: G.S. Bhaskar
- Edited by: M. N. Swamy
- Music by: L. Vaidyanathan
- Production company: Suvarnagiri Films
- Release date: 1992
- Running time: 122 minutes
- Country: India
- Language: Kannada

Kubi Matthu Iyala is a 1992 Indian Kannada-language comedy drama film directed and produced by Sadanand Suvarna and written by Poornachandra Tejaswi based on his own story. The film featured Charuhasan, Raghubir Yadav, Lalithanjali and Vaishali Kasaravalli in the lead roles along with a large number of theater artistes in key supporting roles. The film's music was composed by L. Vaidyanathan and cinematography is G.S. Bhaskar.

The plot revolves around a remote village which is filled with superstitious beliefs and a doctor stationed in the village tries to wipe out all the superstition among the villagers.

The film featured in various film festivals both domestically and internationally. The film also won many awards including Karnataka State and Filmfare Awards.

== Cast ==
- Charuhasan ad Dr Kuberappa or Kubi
- Raghubir Yadav
- Lalithanjali as Iyala
- Vaishali Kasaravalli
- A. B. Jayaram
- Rudramurthy
- Savanth
- Seetharamachar
- Ashwath Narayana
- A. R. Chandrashekar
- Balakrishna Rai
- B. S. Achar
- Umesh Kasaravalli
- Chidananda

== Music ==
The score for the film was composed by L. Vaidyanathan and the film had no soundtrack.

== Awards and accolades ==
1989–90 Karnataka State Film Awards

- Best Film — Sadanand Suvarna
- Best Story — Poornachandra Tejaswi

40th Filmfare Awards South

- Best Actor — Charuhasan

2012
Screened at the Mangalore International Film Festival.
