= Gorava =

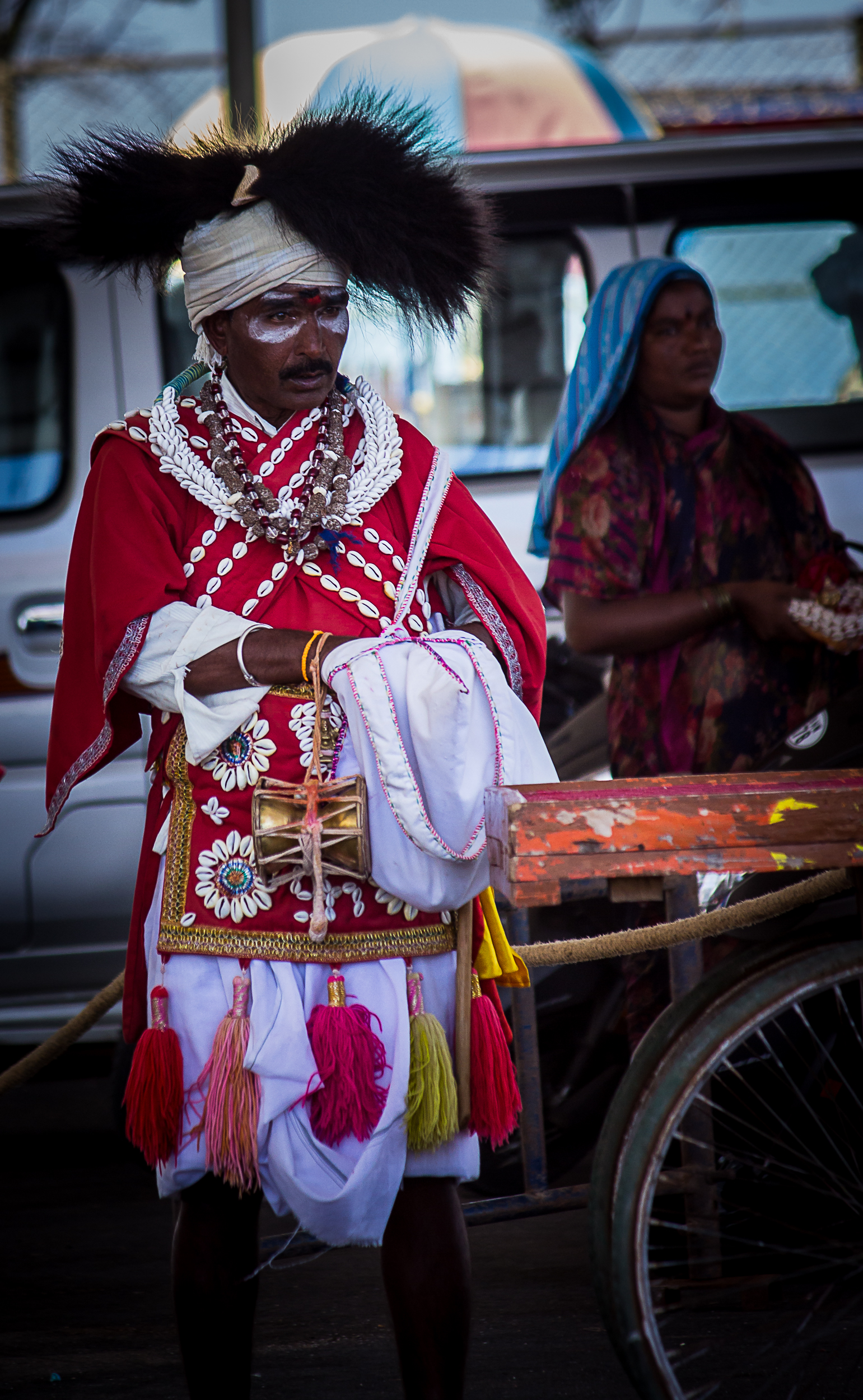
Man in the traditional overcoat and headgear

The term gorava refers to men and women devotees of God Mylara Lingeshwara who have taken a special vow and dress in the traditional overcoat and headgear, and beat a damroo shouting "Elukoti.. Elukoti. Elukoti.", meaning seven crores - the number of Goravas Mailara, armed with a bow and arrows, took to battle against a demon, Mallasura and his brother. They also dance in ritualistic warrior-like dance called the Goravara Kunitha, which involves use of a small damaru in one hand and a flute in other. Goravas wear a headgear made of bear hair.

It is customary in most villages of Karnataka to bring young children in front of the Goravas to get their blessing and to allay the fears of children.
