= 28th International Film Festival of India =

Indian film festival in 1997

- Awarded for: Best of World cinema
- Presented by: Directorate of Film Festivals
- Presented on: 10–20 January 1997
- Official website: www.iffigoa.org

The 28th International Film Festival of India was held from 10 to 20 January 1997 in Thiruvananthapuram as a non-competitive event.

The festival was inaugurated at the Kanakakkunnu Palace by Kerala Chief Minister E. K. Nayanar. American biopic Michael Collins was chosen as the opening film. The festival paid a tribute to the deceased Italian actor Marcello Mastroianni by screening his last film Three Lives and Only One Death. The Mike Leigh drama Secrets & Lies closed the festival.

== Official selections ==
=== Opening film ===
- Michael Collins

=== Closing film ===
- Secrets & Lies

=== Indian Panorama ===
The Directorate of Film Festivals invited criticism after its rejection of Hindi films Daayraa and Maachis, and Bengali film, Yugant to be screened in the Indian Panorama section. Among others, the following films were subsequently screened:

Title	Director	Language
Daughters of This Century	Tapan Sinha	Hindi
Fire	Deepa Mehta	Hindi
Lal Darja	Buddhadeb Dasgupta	Bengali
Kraurya	Girish Kasaravalli	Kannada
