= Bara (1982 film) =

- DVD cover of Kannada version
- Directed by: M. S. Sathyu
- Story by: U. R. Ananthamurthy
- Produced by: M. S. Sathyu
- Starring: Anant Nag; C. R. Simha; Loveleen Madhu; Pankaj Dheer; Veeraj Byakod; M. V. Narayana Rao
- Cinematography: Ashok Gunjal
- Edited by: Chakravarthy
- Music by: Mysore Ananthaswamy; Siddalingaiah
- Production company: M. S. Sathyu Productions
- Release dates: October 1982; (Kannada); 1983 (Hindi)
- Running time: 117 minutes
- Country: India
- Languages: Kannada; Hindi

Bara ( transl. Drought) is a film directed and produced by M. S. Sathyu. It is based on the novel of same name by U. R. Ananthamurthy. Simultaneously shot in Kannada and Hindi, the film starred Anant Nag, C. R. Simha and Loveleen Madhu in lead roles. The film won many laurels upon release including the National Film Award for Best Feature Film in Kannada for its script of an incisive analysis of the socio-political situation in a drought affected district. The film went on floors in 1980 and made its theatrical release in 1982.

The Hindi version of the film Sookha was released in 1983. However, unlike the Kannada version, the film could not get a theatrical release, and was shown on Doordarshan. At the 31st National Film Awards, it won the award for Best Feature Film on National Integration.

== Cast ==
- Anant Nag as Collector Satish Chandra
- C. R. Simha as Bhimoji
- Uma Shivakumar as Bhimoji's wife
- Loveleen Madhu as Satish Chandra's wife
- Veeraj Byakod as Satish Chandra's son
- Shivaram
- Nitin Sethi
- M. V. Narayana Rao
- Pankaj Dheer
- Vaijanath Biradar

== Soundtrack ==
The music was composed by Mysore Ananthaswamy and Siddalingaiah with lyrics by K. S. Nissar Ahmed and Siddalingaiah.

Track listing
No.	Title	Music	Singer(s)	Length
1.	"Ninna Anuragave"	Mysore Ananthaswamy	Jayashree
2.	"Ondanondu Ooru"	Siddalingaiah	Janardhan

== Awards ==
=== Bara ===
- National Film Award for Best Feature Film in Kannada - 1981
- Karnataka State Film Award for Best Film - 1981-82

Filmfare Awards Kannada

- Best Film - Bara (1982)
- Best Director - M. S. Sathyu (1982)
- Best Actor - Anant Nag (1982)

=== Sookha ===
31st National Film Awards

- Best Feature Film on National Integration.

Also at the 31st Filmfare Awards, it was awarded Filmfare Critics Award for Best Movie.
