= Karnataka State Film Award for Best Art Direction =

Indian film award

- State award for contributions to Kannada cinema
- Awarded for: Award for Creating the Sets
- Sponsored by: Government of Karnataka
- Rewards: Silver Medal; ₹ 20,000
- First award: 1993-94
- Final award: 2021
- Most recent winner: Ravi S

Highlights
- Total awarded: 24
- First winner: B. Nagaraj Rao

Karnataka State Film Award for Art Direction is a state film award of the Indian state of Karnataka given during the annual Karnataka State Film Awards. The award honors Kannada-language films.

== Superlative winners ==
• Shashidhar Adapa • Ismail	4 Awards

== Award winners ==
The following is a complete list of award winners and the films for which they won.

Year	Winner	Film
2021	Ravi. S	Bhajarangi 2
2020	Gunasekhar	Bicchugatti
2019	Hosmane Murthy	Mohandas
2018	Shiva Kumar J	K.G.F: Chapter 1
2017	Ravi Santhehaklu	Hebbuli
2016	Shashidhar Adapa	Uppina Kagada
2015	Avinash Narasimharaju	Last Bus
2014	Chandrakanth	143 Nooranalvathamooru
2013	Ravi Santhehaklu	Bhajarangi
2012	Bheemeshappa	Karanika Shishu
2011	Eshwari Kumar	Saarathi
2010-11	Ismail	Sanju Weds Geetha
2009-10	S. A. Venugopal	Aptharakshaka
2008-09	K. Raju	Neenyare
2007-08	G. Murthy	Karunaadu
2006-07	B. Vittal	Kallarali Hoovagi
2005-06	Ismail	Aham Premasmi
2005-06	Shivakumar	Aham Premasmi
2004-05	Dinesh Mangalore	Rakshasa
2003-04	G. Murthy	Chandra Chakori
2002-03	Shashidhar Adapa	Singaaravva
2001-02	Arun Sagar	Sri Manjunatha
2000-01	No award	
1999-2000	Shashidhar Adapa	Kaanuru Heggadathi
1998-99	M. Ismail	Swasthik
1997-98	Ramesh Desai	Thaayi Saheba
1996-97	Shashidhar Adapa	Nagamandala
1995-96	Nazeer	Sipayi
1995-96	Ismail	Sipayi
1994-95	Ramesh Desai	Gangavva Gangamaayi
1994-95	Nanjundaswamy	Gangavva Gangamaayi
1993-94	B. Nagaraj Rao	Kollura Sri Mookambika

== See also ==
- Cinema of Karnataka
- List of Kannada-language films
