= Ijjodu =

- Directed by: M. S. Sathyu
- Screenplay by: M. S. Sathyu
- Story by: Anand
- Produced by: Reliance Big Pictures
- Starring: Aniruddha Jatkar; Meera Jasmine
- Cinematography: G.S. Bhaskar
- Edited by: Sudhanshu Chakravarthy
- Music by: Manikanth Kadri
- Production companies: Reliance Big Pictures; M. S. Sathyu Productions
- Release dates: June 2009 (Ahmedabad International Film Festival); 30 April 2010
- Country: India
- Language: Kannada

Ijjodu (English: The Incompatible) is a 2009 Indian Kannada drama film written and directed by M. S. Sathyu, and stars Anirudh and Meera Jasmine and Anirudh in the lead roles. The film is a story of a young photo journalist's brief encounter with a girl who was made a ‘Basavi’ at the altar of the village deity, to save people who were hit by a devastating epidemic. ‘Basavi’ is a cult very similar to that of the ‘Devdasi’. At present the ‘Devdasies’ have become regular sex workers because of the social stigma and more so for making a living. Many of them are HIV+.

The film premiered at the Ahmedabad International Festival in 2009. It was released theatrically on 30 April 2010, following which it was screened at the Minsk International Film Festival in Belarus, in November.

== Plot ==
The movie is based on story "Nanu Konda Hudugi" ("The Girl I Killed") by famous Kannada writer Ajjampur Sitaram ('Ananda'). The story starts with Ananda, the protagonist specializes in photographing ancient monuments and writing about various rituals and customs that have gone unquestioned. During one of his sojourns in some remote area in Karnataka he comes across the strange case of a village girl ‘Chenni’ by name, daughter of the village Patel and gets obsessed by her very unusual life. In trying to explore more information about her he discovers that she is a victim of a blind faith. Being a ‘Basavi’ she has to treat any guest to her house as the arrival of God himself. Thus she offers him all the comforts of life and serves him in every possible way. This comes as a big shock to Ananda who belongs to an urban milieu. In spite of her seductive ways he resists from exploiting her. He is warned by a mad soldier, a victim of the most unpredictable happenings during a war not to have anything to do with this unfortunate girl and not to stay in that cursed house. The soldier was taken for dead in a bitter battle. His young and lonely wife remarries. But after many months on an obscure day the soldier returns to find his wife pregnant and married to another man. He loses his mental equilibrium and roams about the village in his desert camouflage. He keeps warning people who come to stay in the Patel's house. He is critical of the foolish Patel who sacrificed his only daughter at the altar of the village Deity. Epidemics and wars are similar in nature. In an epidemic a few die and many survive. The epidemic passes. In a war two neighbors fight some die serving the country, some enemies also die for the sake of their home land. War comes to an end and people live in peace. Ananda does not take the mad soldier's warning seriously. He wants him not to have anything to do with this unfortunate girl.

Ananda in his quest wants to stay on and know more about this mysterious girl. When Chenni comes to him in the night and reveals what she is, he is very shocked. He tries to enlighten her saying that her faith is all rubbish. It is just a myth. He says that God cannot be offered what is not pure and touched. He made her to understand that, whatever she has been doing all these years is no different from what a sex worker does. True she may not be doing it for a living but what she has been doing in her blind faith is no different. Then what is the answer. He says that she should lead a normal life. Get married and face life like any other person. But who will come forward in all the villages around to marry her knowing her past. Chenni is prepared to go with Ananda if he can accept her. But Ananda is not bold enough to take the plunge. He succeeded in getting her out of her blind faith but is unable to give her an alternative. Next morning Chenni is missing. A search is on for her. Ultimately she is found dead on the steps of a temple pond. The entire village community looks at Ananda as the guilty one, forgetting their own guilt of keeping Chenni an out cast. The mad soldier seems to be the only person who has been sympathetic to Chenni. Unfortunately it is too late. The police arrive and declare that the whole episode as a case of suicide and there is no foul play. But to Ananda it is he who is the cause for Chenni's death. He accepts his guilt. He was not daring enough to give her a new life.

== Cast ==
- Anirudh as Ananda
- Meera Jasmine as Chenni
- Ramakrishna
- Arundhati
- Sathya
- Naga Kiran
- Arundhathi Jhatkar
- Mandya Ramesh
- Srivathsa
- H. G. Dattatreya
- Venkat Rao
- Ameer Pasha
- Babu

== Reception ==
=== Critical response ===
A critic from The New Indian Express wrote "Manikanth Kadri scores well in the background music department. Cameraman G.S. Bhaskar has done a top class job. "Ijjodu" is for the discerning audience who look out for stories dealing with reality and contemporary issues". A critic from The Times of India scored the film at 3.5 out of 5 stars and says "It is a brilliant piece of work by Anirudh. Meera Jasmine is superb. Sathya is the cream of the team. G S G.S. Bhaskar's camera work is pleasing, while music by Manikant Kadri is average". A critic from Bangalore Mirror wrote "While Anirudh delivers a brilliant performance, Meera Jasmine lacks homework in donning the role of a devadasi. However, Sathya portrayed as soldier Balarama steals the show with his superb performance. The mellifluous music by Manikanth Kadri along with the splendid camera work by G.S. Bhaskar casts a spell". Sugata Srinivasaraju from Outlook wrote "Running parallel to this is the story of another woman, Kempi, who, when war-widowed, takes a bold decision to remarry a person younger to her. While Chenni leads a choiceless life, Kempi exercising her choice is a ready contrast".
