= Goravara Kunitha =

Goravara Kunitha is a traditional dance of Kurubas of Karnataka. Kuruba are devotees of lord Mailara Linga, men belonging to this community take Deekshe or the process of initiation to follow the tradition of Gorava. The Deekshe is usually performed before marriage. They dedicate their rest of lives for lord Mailara Linga and the folk form Goravara Kunitha.

== Deekshe ==
Deekshe to the boys belonging to Kuruba community is given on a preordained date in the presence of Lord Mailara Linga. The guru or head of the Gorava clan blesses and accepts the boy into the sect. A woolen blanket is presented to the person upon his undertaking the Deekshe. Accessories such as Gante (jingle), Jolge (bag), Bandara (holy Turmaric powder), Betha (wooden stick), Dhone (bowl), Damaru (small drum), and Pillangovi (flute) are worshipped and presented to him. These accessories are crucial for him to carry on his life as a Gorava. He is made to wear a red shirt and Kavade sara (cowries necklace) and then takes an oath to serve the Gorava and Kuruba faith.

== Presentation ==
Goravara Kunitha is a traditional dance with religious implication that is performed at festivals, local fairs and also upon invitation in the houses of devotees of lord Mailara Linga. at housewarming ceremonies, devotees invite Goravas to their new homes and is called as mane seve or ogu seve. In private ceremonies like housewarming, a black wollen blanket is spread and a small bowl is kept with milk in it and sometimes bananas and Kajayas are also kept. the offering is worshipped and then the goravayyas break into dance around it. They perform rhythmically accompanied by the sound of their anklets and the intoxicating beat of Damaru. During the performance they sing praises of lord Mailara Linga and repeat Paraks. As they dance they sit and eat the offerings laid out to them. They lie flat on their stomachs and eat the offering without touching it with their hands.

== Public appearances ==
In public appearances the unruly behaviour exhibited in private appearances is avoided. they perform usually in groups of 10-12 people, they stand in a straight line, the senior most Gorava of the group begins the performance by playing his Pilangovi and then beats the Damaru. The rest of the team join him. They move around in circles brandishing their flute and Damaru. They dance making big eyes and raised eyebrows to create scare among the viewers. They recite the stories of Mailara Linga and sometimes Manteswami and Mahadeshwara. These stories are of epic proportions recited continuously and can go on for days.

== Costumes ==
Goravas have unique costumes. The costume is the main attraction of this folk form. A white or yellow Panche/Kache and white full arm Juba are the basic clothing. the head is covered with a rumala, usually a white sari or Panche. The headgear is make of bearskin and placed on the Rumala. In the right hand Nagabetha(wooden stick) is held and in the left Pilangovi (flute). The forehead is smeared with Vibhuthi and the eyes are marked with white and red circles to create a scary look.
