= National High School (Bengaluru) =

The National High School is one of the oldest schools in Bangalore. The school was founded in 1917, by Annie Besant. It is one of the oldest landmarks of the Basavanagudi area. The alumni of this school include Anil Kumble, Vishnuvardhan and EAS Prasanna.
