= Sumatheendra R. Nadig =

Indian Kannada writer

Sumatheendra R Nadig
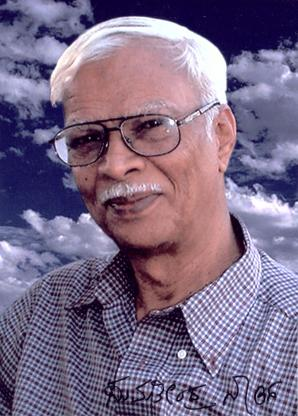
- Born: 4 May 1935; Kalasa, a village in Chickamagalur District, Karnataka, British Raj
- Died: 7 August 2018 (aged 83); Bengaluru, India
- Occupations: Professor, writer
- Writing career
- Movement: Navya

Sumathendra Raghavendra Nadig (4 May 1935 – 7 August 2018) was an Indian professor and writer in Kannada. Nadig came upon the literary scene as a prominent modern poet in the 1960s. He was a close associate of Gopalakrishna Adiga, the leader of the modernist movement.

Nadig's "Dampatya Gita" has been translated into English, Hindi, Bengali and other Indian languages. His other major poem, "Panchabhut", is considered to be an important and original contribution to modern Indian literature. His poetic achievement has been acknowledged by poets including Gopalakrishna Adiga, Pu. Ti. Narasimhachar, Ayyappa Panikar, Sitanshu Yashaschandra, Manohar Rai Sardesai, and G. S. Shivrudrappa; writers including S. L. Bhyrappa and U. R. Anantha Murthy; and scholars including Kapila Vatsyayan and Sibnarayan Ray.

Nadig had two master's degrees in English, one from Mysore University and the other from Temple University (US). He also received a PhD in Kannada from Bangalore University and an honorary doctorate, "Shabda Marthand", from Gurukul Kangri University, Hardwar.

He had received many awards, including the Karnataka Rajyothsava Prashsti, Dinakara Pratisthana Prashasti, V. M. Inamdar Prashsti, and M.V.Si. Puraskara.

He was the Chairman of National Book Trust from 1996 to 1999.

He was well known for his critical studies of Bendre, K.S. Narasimha Swamy and Adiga, and short stories and nursery rhymes, and translations from Bengali to Kannada, and from Kannada to English. He knew Kannada, English, Hindi, Marathi, Konkani, and Bengali.

== Personal life ==
Sumatheendra Nadig was married to Malathi and had three children. He died on 7 August 2018, at the age of 83.

== Awards ==
- Bala Sahitya Puraskara by Sahitya Akademi in 2016
- Kempe Gowda Award, Bruhat Bengaluru Mahanagara Palike, July 2007
- Sri Krishna Prashasti, conferred by Sri Sri Pejawara
- Viswesha Tirtha Swamiji, June 2007
- Vijayeendra Puraskara, conferred by Sri Sri
- Sushameendra Teertha Swamiji, July 2007
- Niranjana Prashasti, 2006
- Aryabhata Award, 2005
- Visweswariah Sahitya Prashasti, 2005
- M.Vi.See, Sahitya Puraskar, 2004
- Sahitya Siri Award, Chickmagalur Jilla Sahitya Parishat, 2002
- UGC Emeritus Fellow, March 2000 – 2002
- Chairman, National Book Trust, India, October 1996 – October 1999
- Award for Translation–Karnataka Sahitya Akademi, 1999
- Awarded 'Vidya Marthanda' honorary degree: Gurukul
- Kangri University, 1997, Haridwar, delivered the convocation address
- V.M. Inamdar Vimarsha Prashasti, 1995
- Rajyotsava Award – Govt. of Karnataka, 1995
- Award for translation – Karnataka Sahitya Akademi, 1994
- Sahitya Akademi Travel Grant, 1991
- Dinakar Pratishthana Award, 1990
- U.G.C. Short Term Research Grant, 1998
- Award for Translation–Karnataka Sahitya Akademi, 1997
- Best Fiction Award – ‘Sudha’ Novel Competition, 1997

== Academic and professional experience ==
- Visiting Professor, Viswa-Bharati, Shantiniketan, October–December 1997
- Visiting Fellow, Jadhavpur University, Calcutta, November 1991 – March 1992
- Reader in English, Bangalore University, 1989–95
- Senior Executive, Bappco Publication, Bangalore 1975–80
- Part-time faculty of the Department of English, Temple University, Philadelphia, 1972–74
- Instructor in English, Haverford College, Haverford, 1973
- Professor and Head of the Department of English, St. Xavier's College, Mapusa, Goa, 1965–197
- Visiting Professor, Bombay University Post-Graduate Centre, Panjim, Goa, 1965–1971.
- Lecturer in English at Margo, Bombay and Belgaum, 1957–65.

== Literary works ==
=== Poetry ===
- Jada Mattu Chetana, 2005
- Pancha Bhootagalu, 2000
- Samagra Kavya, 1998
- Nataraja Kanda Kamanabillu, 1994
- Kuhoo Gita, 1992.
- Tamashe Padyagalu, 1992, 1998
- Dampatya Gita, 1987 (translated into Sanskrit, English, Bengali, Urdu, Tamil, Telugu, Assamese, Malayalam, Punjabi, and Marathi)
- Bhava Loka, 1983
- Udghatane, 1978
- Kappu Devate, 1970
- Nimma Premakumariya Jataka, 1964

=== Criticism ===
- Mounadaacheya Maatu, 2007
- Nalkaneya Sahitya Charitre, 2005
- Mattondu Sahitya Charitre, 2002, 2004
- Bendreyavara Kavyada Vibhinna Nelegalu, 1989, 1998
- Adigaru Mattu Navyakavya, 1968, 75, 98, 2006 (reserved)
- Innondu Sahitya Charitre, 1999
- Heegondu Sahitya Charitre, 1995
- Vimarsheya Dariyalli, 1994
- Kavya Endarenu, 1994

=== Children's books ===
- Dakkanakka Dakkana, 2005
- Dhruva Mattu Prahlada, 2003
- Didilak Didilak, 2002
- Goobeya Kathe, 2000, 2003
- Ili Maduve, 1999
- Galipata, 1999, 2004
- Sahasa (a novel), serialised in 1978, in book form 1979, 1998
- Hannondu Hamsagalu (a play), 1987

=== Short stories ===
- Sthithaprajna, 1996
- Aayda Kathegalu, 1992 (textbook for B.A., BSc and B.Com. students of Bangalore University 1992–1993)
- Gili Mattu Dumbi, 1985
- Karkotaka, 1975, 1998

Some of his stories have been translated into Bengali, Malayalam, Tamil, Telugu, Marathi, Hindi, Urdu, Oriya and English.

=== Translations ===
From English to Kannada:

- Radhanath Ray, 1991 – Sahitya Akademi
- Sindhi Sahitya Charitre, 1981 – Sahitya Akademi
- Dickens 'Hard Times', 1981 (with Venugopala Soraba)
- Aristophane's 'Birds', 1990
- Ruskin's 'Unto The Last', 1979
- Strindberg's 'Miss Julie', 1979
- Ionesco's 'Bokka Taleya Nartaki', 1974

From Bengali to Kannada:

- Tagore's 'Tin Sangi', 1998
- Nirendranath Chakravarthi's 'Ulang Raja', 1996
- Poems from Bengal, 2002

=== Books published in English ===
- Selected poems of Gopalaksirhna Adiga; Sahitya Akademi, 2005
- Veerappa Moily's novel 'On to the Great Beyond', 2003
- The Buddha Smile with P. Sreenivas Rao
- A House of Thousand Doors
- Poems of G. S. Shivarudrappa
- 20th Century Kannada Poetry with an introduction by Nissim Ezekiel
- Selected Kannada Short Stories and Jnanapeeth Laureatres of Karnataka (with L. S. Seshagiri Rao)
- Roots and Wings (Poems of P. Sreenivasa Rao), 2007
- Complete works of P. Sreenivasa Rao, 2002
- Critical Studies of S. L. Bhyrappa's Works, 2002

== See also ==
- Kannada
- Kannada literature
