= M. S. Sathyu =

Indian film director (born 1930)

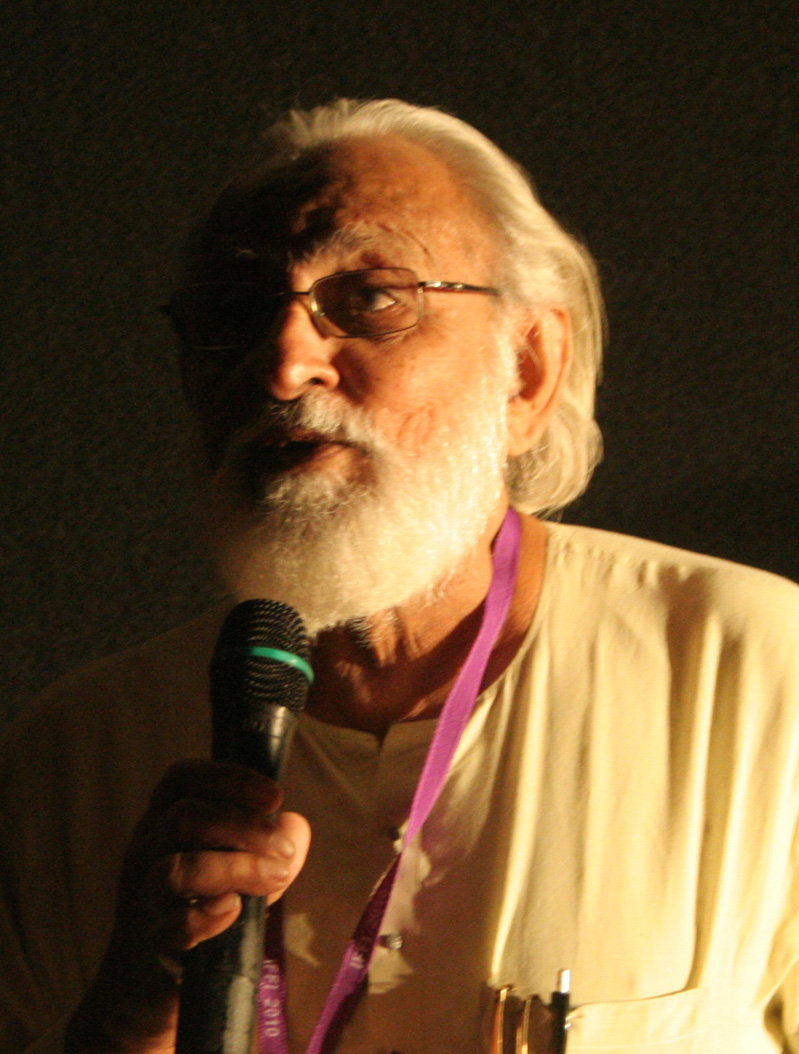
- Sathyu in 2010
- Born: 6 July 1930 (age 96); Mysore, Kingdom of Mysore, British India
- Occupations: Film director Stage Designer; Art Director
- Known for: Garm Hava and Bara
- Spouse: Shama Zaidi

Mysore Shrinivas Sathyu (born 6 July 1930) is a film director, stage designer and art director from India. He is best known for his directorial Garm Hava (1973), which was based on the partition of India. He was awarded Padma Shri in 1975.

== Early and personal life ==
Born into a Kannada family, Sathyu grew up in Mysore. He pursued his higher education at Mysore and later Bangalore. In 1952, he quit college while working on his Bachelor of Science degree. Sathyu is married to Shama Zaidi, a north Indian Shia Muslim. They have two daughters.

== Career ==
Sathyu freelanced as an animator in 1952–53. After being unemployed for nearly four years, he got his first salaried job as assistant director to filmmaker Chetan Anand. He worked in theatre as a designer and director, including designing sets and lights for productions of Hindustani Theatre, Okhla Theatre of Habib Tanvir, Kannada Bharati and other groups of Delhi. In films, he has worked as an art director, cameraman, screenwriter, producer and director. His first film as an independent art director was Haqeeqat, a film by Chetan Anand, which won him recognition and the 1965 Filmfare Award for Best Art Direction. His filmography includes over 15 documentaries and 8 feature films in Hindi, Urdu and Kannada.

His best known work, Garm Hava (Scorching Winds, 1973), is one of the last cinema productions featuring 1950s Marxist cultural activists, including Balraj Sahni and Kaifi Azmi. Garm Hava won several Indian national awards in 1974, including a National Integration Award. It was screened in the competitive section at Cannes Film Festival and was also the Indian entry at the Oscars. It won the Filmfare award for best screenplay.

M. S. Sathyu currently is associated mainly with television and stage. In 2013, Sathyu featured in the popular Google Reunion ad, where he played the role of Yusuf, an elderly Pakistani man who is reunited with his childhood pre-partition friend from India, Baldev (Vishwa Mohan Badola). The commercial went viral on social media. Sathyu is one of the patrons of Indian People's Theatre Association (IPTA). He directed the musical play Gul-e Bakavali written by Sudheer Attavar and represented the 8th World Theatre Olympics in 2018. He also directed plays like Dara Shikoh, Amrita, Bakri, Kuri, Akhri Shama and many more. In 2014, his debut film Garm Hava was re-released after restoration.

== Awards ==
- 1965: Filmfare Best Art Direction Award – Haqeeqat (for black-and-white film category)
- 1974: Cannes Film Festival: Golden Palm – Garm Hava (Nominated)
- 1974: National Film Award: Nargis Dutt Award for Best Feature Film on National Integration – Garam Hawa
- 1975: Padma Shri
- 1981-82: Karnataka State Film Award for First Best Film for "Bara"
- 1981-82: Karnataka State Film Award for Best Director for "Bara"
- 1982: Filmfare Award for Best Film – Kannada for "Bara"
- 1982: Filmfare Award for Best Director – Kannada for "Bara"
- 1984: National Film Award: Nargis Dutt Award for Best Feature Film on National Integration – Sookha
- 1984: Filmfare Critics Award for Best Movie Hindi – Sookha
- 1994: Sangeet Natak Akademi Award – Stagecraft
- 2014: Sangeet Natak Akademi Fellowship – Theatre

== Production ==
=== Theatre plays ===
- Gul E Bakavali – musical Play written by Sudheer Attavar
- Dara Shikoh – written by Danish Iqbal
- Mudrarkshas
- Aakhri Shama
- Rashmon
- Bakri ("Kuri" in Kannada)
- Girija Ke sapne
- Mote Ram Ke Sathyagrah
- Emil's Enemies
- Amrita

=== Films ===
Feature Films

- Ek Tha Chotu Ek Tha Motu
- Garm Hawa (Hot Wind), 1973
- Chithegu Chinthe, 1978 – Screened at 7th IFFI
- Kanneshwara Rama (The Legendary Outlaw)
- Kahan Kahan Se Guzar Gaya, 1981
- Bara (Famine), 1982 – based on a short story by U.R. Anantha Murthy
- Sookha, 1983 – Hindi version of the Kannada movie Bara
- Galige, 1994, Kannada
- Kotta, 1999, Kannada
- Ijjodu, 2009, Kannada

Short films and Documentaries

- Irshad
- Black Mountain
- Ghalib
- Islam in India

=== Television ===
TV serials

- Pratidhwani, 1985
- Choli Daaman, 1987–88
- Kayar (Coir), 1992
- Antim Raja (The Last Raja of Coorg), 1986

Tele-films

- Aangan
- Ek Hadsa Char Pehlu
- Thangam

Television and YouTube Advertisements

- Reunion, an advertisement for Google Search
