= Sudha Belawadi =

Indian film and television actress

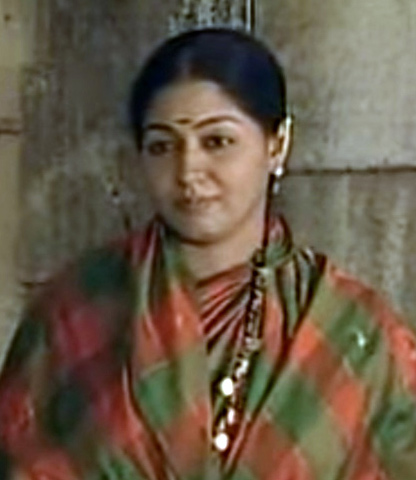
- Sudha Belawadi in 2003 telefilm, ′Subbanna′
- Born: 28 February 1970 (age 56); Bengaluru, Karnataka, India
- Occupation: Actress
- Spouse: M. G. Sathya Rao
- Children: 2, including Samyukta Hornad
- Mother: Bhargavi Narayan
- Relatives: Prakash Belawadi (brother)

Sudha Belawadi (born 28 February 1970) is an Indian actress known for her work in Kannada cinema and television. She is also a theatre artist in Karnataka, India. Some of her notable films include Mathadana (2001), Mungaru Male (2006), Moggina Manasu (2008), Kaadu (1973).

== Career ==
Belawadi acted as a child in films such as Bhootayyana Maga Ayyu (1974). She continued acting as an adult and has been a part of more than 70 films, many drama (theatre) plays, and soaps/serials Manthana, Manvanthara, Mahaparva.

Belawadi received a major break in films when she played the mother of Ganesh's character in Mungaru Male (2006). She noted: "Playing Ganesh's mom in the film was one of the most memorable roles because it was written so well."

== Personal life ==
Belawadi is the daughter of Bhargavi Narayan, an actress, and Belavadi Nanjundaiah Narayana (a.k.a. Makeup Nani), a Kannada film actor, and a makeup artist. Her siblings are Sujatha, Prakash and Pradeep. Prakash is a theatre, film, television and media personality, and a National Film Award recipient, for his directorial Stumble in 2002.

Belawadi is married to M. G. Sathya Rao and their children are Shantanu and Samyukta Hornad. Samyukta is also an actress.

== Filmography ==
=== Films ===
- All films are in Kannada, unless otherwise noted.

Year	Title	Role	Notes
1973	Kaadu		
1974	Bhootayyana Maga Ayyu		Credited as Baby Sudha
1976	Pallavi		
1979	Muyyi		
1997	Thaayi Saheba	Chandri	
1998	Shanti Shanti Shanti	Bank Manager	
2001	Mathadana	Sunanda	
2003	Paris Pranaya	Pavani	
2004	Abbabba Entha Huduga		
2004	Joke Falls		
2006	Mungaru Male	Kamala	
2007	Meera Madhava Raghava		
2007	Krishna	Pooja's mother	
2007	Yuga		
2008	Gaalipata	Ganesh's mother	
2008	Minchina Ota		
2008	Moggina Manasu	Chanchala's mother	
2008	Dheemaku		
2009	Gulama	Vanajakshi	
2009	Jhossh	Meena's mother	
2009	Auto		
2009	Kaaranji		
2009	Prem Kahani		
2009	Bhagyada Balegaara		
2009	Gilli	Guru's mother	
2009	Mooru Guttu Ondu Sullu Ondu Nija		
2009	Parichaya	Girija	
2009	Kallara Santhe		
2010	Swayamvara		
2010	Sri Moksha		
2010	Thamassu	Salma	
2010	Shourya		
2010	Kari Chirathe		
2010	Pancharangi	Vaishali	
2010	Jothegara	Vishwas' mother	
2010	Rame Gowda vs Krishna Reddy		
2011	Karthik		
2011	Dhool		
2011	Hudugaru	Lakshmi	
2011	Mr. Duplicate	Souparnika	
2011	Panchamrutha		
2011	Lifeu Ishtene		
2011	Putra		
2012	Dev Son of Mudde Gowda		
2012	Romeo	Vijayamma	
2012	Godfather	Sujatha	
2013	Hejjegalu		
2013	Nenapinangala		
2013	Bachchan	Bharath's mother	
2013	Googly	Kausalya	
2013	Neralu		
2013	Barfi	Santosh' mother	
2013	Raja Huli	Kaveri's mother	
2013	Ambara		
2014	Parinaya		
2014	Oggarane	—N/a	Dubbing artist
2014	24 Carat		
2014	Rose		
2015	Abhinetri		
2015	Vaastu Prakaara		
2015	Rana Vikrama	Vikram's mother	
2015	Ekka Saka		Tulu film
2015	Goolihatti		
2015	Buguri	Krishna's mother	
2015	First Rank Raju	Raju's mother	
2015	Cigarette		
2016	Nan Love Track		
2016	Jessie	Nandini's mother	
2016	U Turn		
2016	Nanna Ninna Prema Kathe		
2016	Puta Thirugisi Nodi	Veena	
2016	Just Aakasmika		
2016	Idolle Ramayana	Bhujanga's wife	
2017	Smile Please	Ranganayaki	
2017	Ondanondu Dina	Pallavi	Short film
2017	Kaafi Thota		
2017	Athiratha	Akash's mother	
2018	Swartharatna		
2019	Aduva Gombe		
2019	Londonalli Lambodhara	Lambodhara's mother	
2019	Ayushman Bhava		Cameo appearance
2019	Nam Gani B.Com Pass		
2019	Kannad Gothilla		
2020	Ramana Savari		
2020	Matte Udbhava		
2020	Act 1978	Sabiha Bhanu	
2020	Arishadvarga		
2022	Saara Vajra	Halima	
2022	Petromax	L. Shanthakumari	
2022	Chase		
2022	Gaalipata 2	Kumuda	
2022	Lucky Man	Arjun's mother	
2022	MRP	Sheelavantha's mother	
2022	Hadinelentu	Arathi	
2022	Champion		
2022	Ninga		
2022	Made in Bengaluru		
2023	Prajarajya		
2023	Kaasina Sara		
2023	Mandala: The UFO Incident	Yashoda	
2023	Kousalya Supraja Rama	Kousalya	
2023	Aachar & Co	Savitri Aachar	
2023	Baang	Suchitra Kamath	
2023	Sneharshi		
2024	Bachelor Party	Ashwath Narayan's wife	
2024	Abbabba	Akhila's mother	
2024	For Regn	Akshay's mother	
2024	Matinee		
2024	Hagga		
2024	Max	Arjun's mother	
2025	Shanubhogara Magalu		
2025	Doora Theera Yaana		
2025	Son of Muthanna		
2025	Kunte Bille		
2025	Gatha Vaibhava		

=== Television ===
Year	Title	Role	Notes	Ref.
2002	Manvanthara			
2015	Shrirasthu Shubhamasthu	Kala		
2018–	Magalu Janaki			
2021–2023	Lakshana	Shakuntala Devi		

== See also ==
- List of people from Karnataka
