= Jodi (1999 film) =

- Poster
- Directed by: Praveenkanth
- Written by: Praveenkanth
- Produced by: Sunanda Murali Manohar
- Starring: Prashanth; Simran
- Cinematography: Arthur A. Wilson
- Edited by: M. N. Raja
- Music by: A. R. Rahman
- Production company: Soni Orient
- Release date: 9 September 1999
- Running time: 161 minutes
- Country: India
- Language: Tamil

Jodi (transl. Couple) is a 1999 Indian Tamil-language romantic comedy drama film written and directed by Praveenkanth and produced by Sunanda Murali Manohar. The film stars Prashanth and Simran. Vijayakumar, Nassar and Srividya play supporting roles. The soundtrack is composed by A. R. Rahman, featuring music reused from his own earlier soundtrack for the Hindi film Doli Saja Ke Rakhna, except for the song Oru Poiyavathu. Due to Rahman's unavailability, Praveen signed Sabesh–Murali to quickly compose the background score.

Jodi released on 9 September 1999 and became commercially successful. It was remade in Kannada in 2006 as Sajni.

== Plot ==
Kannan is a young music shop employee. He dreams of a girl who wears gold anklets and decides to find her. One day, he sees the feet of a running girl, and realises that she is the girl he has been dreaming of and follows her. Soon after, he goes to a music college to repair music instruments. Gayathri, a student of that college, is the girl which Kannan found as his dream girl. She and her friends approach and request him to not repair the music instruments, as they are very old and unfit to use for the music contest. Kannan uses the opportunity to become close to her but Gayathri is angered by his behaviour. He accompanies Gayathri to Bangalore for the music contest, where Gayathri sees him getting money from a rival music band. On the day of the contest, Gayathri and her team are shocked to learn that the song which they have composed was stolen by the other troupe. She assumes that Kannan has stolen and sold their work for money despite Kannan's protest that he is innocent. He lends her one of the love poems he had written for her, and she sings it in the contest and wins the prize. Gayathri understands that Kannan has no role in the stealing of the song and he got money from the troop for fixing their repaired music instruments. She realises her mistake and rushes to apologize and accept his love, and soon, they start dating. Kannan gets news that his father was injured and rushes home.

Kannan's father Rudramurthy works at a registrar office where he witnesses many marriages take place without the consent of couple's parents. He is against such marriages and prevents one such marriage by advising the girl who had come to marry her lover and sending her home, which led to an attack by the groom and his friends. Kannan understood that he is going to have a tough time with his love and his father who hates love marriages. Gayathri, on other hand, has a family with a father who is very depressed by an incident which took place in his life. Gayathri's friend and her lover commit suicide due to pressure put up by the parents against their love. This upsets Gayathri and she is scared on how to marry Kannan. Both of them plan to visit the family of the other, impress them, and get permission for their marriage.

Gayathri sets out to Kannan's home as the lost daughter of troublesome neighbour of Kannan and Kannan sets to Gayathri's home only to earn a name of vagabond from her family. They try their level best to get into the home of other's families and succeed to some extent. Gayathri manages to win the heart of Rudramurthy when she stops his daughter, who was about to run away from her home with her lover. This makes Rudramurthy accept her as his daughter-in-law. On the other hand, Kannan visits his home with much depression reason being failing to accomplish his mission. Kannan finds the reason for Gayathri's father Vengudu's condition as one incident. Vengudu is a music critic and his criticism plays a vital role in one's music career. Vengudu once made a bad criticism about a male vocalist in front of the audience and also in the next day newspaper which led the vocalist to commit suicide. The wife of the vocalist shouts at him and curses him for bring her a fate. From then he stopped his critic job and has been living with remorse. Kannan attempts to solve his problem by visiting the vocalist's house and explains the current condition of Vengudu. He requests them forgive him and visit his home to which the lady accepts. On the day of the visit the lady proposes marriage alliance of her son Sivabalan, who met Gayathri on the music contest at Bangalore with Vengudu's daughter Gayathri, to which Vengudu accepts. On hearing about her marriage, Gayathri screams that she will not let this happen and goes to convince her father. On seeing her father, he falls at her feet and she is tongue tied as she finds her father has changed a lot and her marriage would bring him complete relief from his guilt.

However, on the day of the marriage, Sivabalan sings the love song written by Kannan for Gayathri, which she sang in the music contest. On hearing this song, Gayathri runs to Kannan and hugs him. Sivabalan explains to Vengudu that Kannan and Gayathri love each other very much, and tells him not to separate them. Vengudu accepts them as he does not want to commit another mistake and spend his life in guilt. Kannan and Gayathri are united together in the end.

== Cast ==
- Prashanth as Kannan
- Simran as Gayathri
- Vijayakumar as Vengudu
- Nassar as Rudramurthy
- Janagaraj as Nachimuthu
- Ramesh Khanna as Gayathri's brother-in-law
- Srividya as Sadagoppan's wife
- Ambika as Sneha Varatharajan
- Sumithra as Gayathri's mother
- Dhamu as Kannan's friend
- Dinanthorum Nagaraj as Kannan's friend
- Sakthi Chidambaram as Kannan's friend
- S. N. Lakshmi as Kannan's grandmother
- Shanthi Williams as Kannan's mother
- Lavanya as Uma
- Janaki Sabesh as Prospective bride's mother
- Priyanka as Autorickshaw call girl
- Pandu as House owner
- Madhan Bob as Music store owner
- Ramji as Siva
- Sukran as Autorickshaw driver
- Manager Cheena as Marriage broker
- Laxmi Rattan as Prospective bride's father

Guest appearances

- Ramesh Aravind as Sivabalan
- Isha Koppikar as Prospective bride
- Nizhalgal Ravi as Sadagoppan
- Praveenkanth as Eloping youngster
- Vairamuthu as himself
- Gangai Amaren as himself

Uncredited role

- Trisha as Anuradha, Gayathri's friend

== Production ==
Sunanda Murali Manohar was keen to film Tamil versions of A. R. Rahman's songs from the Hindi film Doli Saja Ke Rakhna (1998) as a music album, and discussed making the project with director Praveenkanth, cinematographer Jeeva and choreographer Raju Sundaram. Praveenkanth, reverted to his original name, after being known as Praveen Gandhi in his debut film Ratchagan (1997).

Praveen first approached Vijay to play the lead role, but his refusal meant that Prashanth, who had appeared in Manohar's earlier productions Jeans (1998) and Kaadhal Kavidhai (1998), was selected. Aishwarya Rai was offered the female lead role after the success of her previous Tamil film, Jeans, but her busy schedule in Hindi films and her decision to prioritise her work in Kandukondain Kandukondain (2000), resulted in Simran eventually being cast in the role. Aishwarya had then agreed to appear in a guest appearance in the film, but her unavailability led to Isha Koppikar eventually doing the part. Trisha, winner of the Miss Chennai 1999 beauty pageant, made an appearance in a role as a friend of Simran's character.

The film shared a similar storyline to the Suriya and Jyothika starrer Poovellam Kettuppar, released earlier in the same year, which incidentally had Vijayakumar and Nassar playing similar roles of leader of feuding families. The song "Velli Malare" shot at Lalitha Mahal, Mysore.

== Soundtrack ==
The director approached A. R. Rahman to compose music for the film, but Rahman's tight schedules made him decline the offer. The director went ahead with using five of Rahman's earlier tunes from Doli Saja Ke Rakhna, with two new songs "Oru Poiyavadhu" and "Mel Nattu Isai" added. Due to Rahman's unavailability, the director brought the duo Sabesh–Murali to complete the background score soon. Lyrics were penned by Vairamuthu. Rahman penned the opening lyrics to "Oru Poiyavadhu".

S.No	Song	Singer(s)	Duration	Notes
1	"Kai Thatti Thatti"	Srinivas, Timmy	4:08	reused "Taram Pum Taram Pum" from Doli Saja Ke Rakhna
2	"Kadhal Kaditham"	S. Janaki, Unni Menon	4:59	reused "Kissa Hum Likhenge" from Doli Saja Ke Rakhna
3	"Anjathe Jeeva"	Sirkazhi G. Sivachidambaram, Swarnalatha	5:29	reused "Chal Kheva Re Kheva" from Doli Saja Ke Rakhna
4	"Vanna Poongavai"	Mahalakshmi Iyer, Srinivas	6:05	reused "Jhoola Bahon Ka Aaj Bhi" from Doli Saja Ke Rakhna
5	"Velli Malarae"	S. P. Balasubrahmanyam, Mahalakshmi Iyer	6:32	reused "Bole Sajni Mori Sajni" from Doli Saja Ke Rakhna
6	"Velli Malarae"	Instrumental	6:32	
7	"Oru Poiyavadhu"	Srinivas, Sujatha Mohan	6:00	
8	"Oru Poiyavadhu"	Hariharan	7:06	
9	"Mel Nattu Isai"	K. S. Chithra	1:09	

== Release and reception ==
Jodi was released on 9 September 1999. K. P. S. of Kalki wrote the script crawls like a snail till the break and picks up after the break at jet speed. He added that although it is a new film, it gives one a feeling as if they have seen everything somewhere. D. S. Ramanujam of The Hindu wrote, "Director Pravin Gandhi works diligently with his screenplay based on his story to present an enjoyable entertainer in Soni Orient's presentation, Jodi". K. N. Vijiyan of New Straits Times wrote, "See [Jodi] for the songs, Prasanth, Simran and of course the humour. This is an above average movie for the whole family". Reviewing the Telugu dubbed version, Gopalrao Griddaluru of Zamin Ryot wrote that the second half of the film is suspenseful with good twists and hits the hearts of the audience.

== Other versions ==
Jodi was dubbed in Telugu under the same name later that year. The film was remade into Kannada as Sajni (2007) by the same producer featuring her niece Sharmiela Mandre. A Hindi version of Jodi was planned by the director with different songs and small changes in the storyline, but the project never took off.

== Legacy ==
The film's success prompted director Praveen Kanth to collaborate with Prashanth and Simran again in a project called Star, but Simran soon dropped out and the film failed to replicate the success of Jodi. Furthermore, Simran and Prashanth were later paired together in Saran's Parthen Rasithen (2000), after being dubbed as a "hit pair".
