= Sivamani =

Sivamani may refer to:

- Sivamani (percussionist) (born 1959), Indian percussionist also known as Drums Sivamani
- Sivamani (film), 2003 Indian Telugu-language romantic action film

== See also ==
- Shivamani, 2009 Indian Kannada-language film
