= Hum Kisise Kum Nahin =

Hum Kisise Kum Nahin may refer to:

- Hum Kisise Kum Naheen, 1977 film
- Hum Kisise Kum Nahin, 2002 film
