= Swayamvara (2010 film) =

- VCD cover
- Directed by: R Anantharaju
- Produced by: M Chandru
- Starring: Diganth; Srinagara Kitty; Sharmiela Mandre
- Cinematography: H C Venu
- Edited by: Deepu S Kumar
- Music by: Manikanth Kadri
- Release date: 19 March 2010
- Country: India
- Language: Kannada

Swayamvara is a 2010 Indian Kannada-language film directed by R Anantharaju, starring Diganth, Srinagara Kitty and Sharmiela Mandre in lead roles. Actor M.Chandru who produced this movie was known as "Swayamvara" Chandru for a brief period until producing Kaddipudi after which he was known as "Kaddipudi" Chandru. The movie is a remake of 2004 Hindi movie Mujhse Shaadi Karogi which was based on the 2001 Tamil movie Kabadi Kabadi which in turn was inspired by the 2000 English movie Meet the Parents.

== Cast ==
- Diganth as Vijay
- Srinagara Kitty as Ajay
- Sharmiela Mandre as Anu
- Rangayana Raghu as Col Kenchappa
- Sudha Belawadi
- M. N. Lakshmi Devi
- Ramesh Bhat
- M. S. Umesh
- Tennis Krishna
- Harish Rai

== Music ==
Swayamvara

Soundtrack album by Manikanth Kadri
- Released: 2010
- Recorded: 2010
- Genre: Feature film soundtrack
- Length: 21:32
- Language: Kannada

Official audio
- Swayamvara - Full Album on YouTube

Track listing
No.	Title	Singer(s)	Length
1.	"Milky Baby"	Anitha Karthikeyan, Balu Thangachan, Sindhuja Rajaram	4:14
2.	"Shuruvaayithu"	Rajesh Krishnan	4:48
3.	"Kaadige Kanna"	Benny Dayal, Chaitra H. G.	4:32
4.	"Ambaari"	Manikanth Kadri, Rakesh Raghuram, Chaitra H. G.	4:35
5.	"Anusha"	Gurukiran, Manikanth Kadri, Maya	4:03
Total length:			21:32

== Reception ==
The critical reception of the film was mixed. A critic from The New Indian Express wrote "Almost all the character artists have performed well in the film. H.C. Venu has done a good job behind camera. "Swayamvara" is an average fare and is worth just a one-time watch". B S Srivani from Deccan Herald wrote "Kitti is up to the task. Sharmila is restrained and oozing glamour wherever required. Having perfected the art of grating on the nerves in other films, the dimpled actor manages to pull off inane jokes easily. ‘Swayamvara’ is a nice title for a less-than-nice film". Shruti Indira Lakshminarayana from Rediff.com scored the film at 2.5 out of 5 stars and says "Dialogues don't have much punch, and despite all the songs being original scores and big names like Yograj Bhatt, Nagendra Prasad, Sudhir Athawar, Arjun and Tushar Ranganath writing the lyrics, Manikanth Kadri's music is not catchy. The film also seems a tad too lengthy". A critic from Bangalore Mirror wrote "All the actors churn out decent performances. Rangayana Raghu whose character is at the receiving end of Kitty’s mis-directed efforts to woo Sharmila is fun to watch. Sharmila oozes glamour and her eye candy image is worth the trip to the cinema hall".
