= Nikita Aria =

Indian presenter

- Born: Nikita Aria Palekar; Bombay, India
- Other name: Supriya
- Occupations: TV presenter, Creative Director, actress, model, anchor, veejay, dancer
- Years active: 1995–2009

Nikita Aria Palekar also known as Supriya, is an Indian television presenter, creative director, model, actress, Veejay, western jazz, ballet, contemporary and classical dancer. She hosted several TV shows & live events, modeled in commercials and acted in prime time TV soaps, corporate and feature films in various languages.

== Television shows (TV presenter) ==
Year	Show	Notes
1995	Thirai Isai	GEC / STARVijay TV - Popular music videos
1996	Miss India South	From Auditions to Finals
1996	Matravai	The Breakfast show
1997-1999	Cine Diary	Glance of Feature films in production
2000-2003	Tillana Tillana	Popular Talent Dance competition
2001	Pop Time	Top Official Pop Hits, Hosted and Directed by herself
2004-2007	Namma Neram	Spoof of superhit comedies
2005	College Gallata	Non-stop fun with college students
2005	Start Camera Action	Behind the scenes
2006	Comedy Time	Comedy show
2006	Comedy countdown	Weekly countdown of top comedy clips from films
2007	"Ooh La La" Grande Finale	Talent hunt show judged by Oscar, BAFTA and Grammy winner A.R. Rahman
2007	Masthana Masthana	Celebrity Dance competition

== Television Soaps ==
Year	Show	Notes
1997-1999	Jannal	Directed by K. Balachander
1997	Dream girl	Zee TV
1997	Malini	Mystery drama
1998	Pudhayal	
1999	Nirangal	Sun TV (India)
2005	Vikramadithyan	Directed by Sripriya
2005	Manaivi	Directed by CJ Bhaskar
2005	Selvangal	
2006	Penn	Directed by CJ Bhaskar
2006	Selvi	Radaan mediaworks
2006	Krishna Cottage	Indian remake of "Friends", Directed by Prabhu Nepal
2006	Lakshmi	
2006-2007	Kolangal	
2007	Anjali	Directed by CJ Bhaskar

== Filmography ==
Year	Film	Notes
1998	Swarnamukhi	Special appearance
1998	Kaadhal Kavidhai	Filmed in London, produced by Sunanda Murali Manohar, Ashok Amritraj, Directed by national award winner Agathiyan
2000	Hey Ram	Guest Appearance Directed by Kamal Haasan
2001	Majanu	Directed by Dwarakish
2006	Rendu	Special appearance, Produced & Directed by Khushbu Sundar, Sundar C

== See also ==
- List of Indian film actresses
