= Last Bus =

Last Bus and very similar titles may refer to one of several articles as noted below:

- Last Bus (2016 film), an Indian thriller directed by S D Arvind
- The Last Bus (2021 film), a British drama directed by Gillies MacKinnon
- The Last Bus (TV series), a British science fiction adventure created by Paul Neafcy

== See also ==
- Last Bus to Woodstock
