= Sajni (film) =

- VCD cover
- Directed by: Murugesh
- Screenplay by: Murugesh
- Story by: Praveen Kanth
- Based on: Jodi (Tamil)
- Produced by: Sonali Nikhil; Sunanda Murali Manohar
- Starring: Dhyan; Sharmila Mandre; Anant Nag
- Cinematography: M. M. Rangaswamy; Ian Howes
- Edited by: V. T. Vijayan
- Music by: Songs: A. R. Rahman (Compositions reused from Jodi); Background score: Sabesh–Murali
- Production company: Metro Film Corporation Ltd
- Release date: 23 February 2007
- Running time: 146 minutes
- Country: India
- Language: Kannada

Sajni, (also spelled as Sajani or Sajini), is a 2007 Indian Kannada-language film directed by Murugesh. The film stars Dhyan, Sharmila Mandre and Anant Nag in lead roles. lead actress Sharmila Mandre makes her Kannada debut through this film. The film is produced by Sonali Nikhil and Sunanda Murali Manohar. The film is the Kannada remake of Tamil film Jodi which was released in 1999. For the first time in Kannada cinema, the film featured a soundtrack composed by A. R. Rahman with all compositions re-used from Rahman's Tamil film Jodi which in turn had re-used some of the tracks from Rahman's Hindi movie Doli Saja Ke Rakhna. The film was released statewide on 23 February 2007.

== Cast ==
- Dhyan as Vikram
- Sharmila Mandre as Sajni
- Anant Nag as Ananth Murthy
- Avinash as Vikram's father
- Bhavya as Ananth Murthy's sister
- Amulya as Vikram's sister
- Shivaram as Grandfather
- M. S. Umesh as Secretary
- Master Anand
- Himanshu Malik as Singer Kailash
- Chaya Singh in a cameo appearance

== Soundtrack ==
Sajni

Soundtrack album by A. R. Rahman
- Released: 25 December 2006
- Recorded: 1998–2006
- Studio: Panchathan Record Inn and AM Studios
- Genre: Film soundtrack
- Length: 39:44
- Label: Metro Audio
- Producer: A. R. Rahman

A. R. Rahman chronology
Guru (2006)	Sajni (2006)	Provoked (2007)

The official soundtrack contains seven songs re-used from A. R. Rahman's Jodi soundtrack, which itself reused five of its songs from his earlier Bollywood film Doli Saja Ke Rakhna. The background score of the film was composed by Sabesh–Murali due to Rahman's unavailability.

No.	Title	Lyrics	Singer(s)	Length
1.	"Chandramukhiye"	Kaviraj	Naresh Iyer, Madhushree, Roop Kumar Rathod	6:32
2.	"Lovely London"	Belluru Ramamoorthy	Shweta Mohan	4:53
3.	"Turu Tunthuru"	Kaviraj	Shreya Ghoshal	4:09
4.	"Ondu Sulladaru"	J.M. Prahlad	Srinivas, Sujatha Mohan	5:57
5.	"Jaana O Jaana"	V. Manohar	Srinivas	5:57
6.	"Ondu Sulladaru" (Solo)	J.M. Prahlad	Srinivas	5:57
7.	"Chandramukhiye" (Instrumental)			6:28
Total length:				39:44

== Reception ==
R. G. Vijayasarathy of IANS wrote, "Sajini is good in its second half. It is a family entertainer which could be seen once". A critic from Rediff.com gave the film 2 out of 5, writing "Though Sajini has all the ingredients of a good family entertainer, it doesn't rise above mediocrity." Sify wrote "This remake of the Tamil film 'Jodi' is interesting because of its content, performance of lead actors, super songs by A.R.Rehman and pleasing cinematography".
