= Provoked (film) =

- Directed by: Jag Mundhra
- Written by: Carl Austin; Rahila Gupta
- Produced by: Sunanda Murali Manohar
- Starring: Aishwarya Rai; Robbie Coltrane; Miranda Richardson; Naveen Andrews
- Cinematography: Madhu Ambat
- Edited by: Sanjeev Mirajkar
- Music by: A. R. Rahman
- Distributed by: Private Moments Ltd
- Release dates: 14 June 2006 (International Indian Film Academy Festival); 6 April 2007 (United Kingdom)
- Country: United Kingdom
- Language: English
- Budget: ₹120 million (INR)
- Box office: ₹240,000,000(INR) or US$3,078,709 (INT)

Provoked is a 2006 British biographical drama film, directed by Jag Mundhra. It stars Aishwarya Rai, Naveen Andrews, Miranda Richardson, Robbie Coltrane, Nandita Das and Steve McFadden. The film is loosely based on the true story of Kiranjit Ahluwalia, who unintentionally killed her abusive husband.

Cinematography for the film was handled by Madhu Ambat. The film's score and soundtrack was composed by A. R. Rahman, and the theme song for the film, Alive, was composed by Rahman and sung by Karen David, who has a small cameo in the film. Shot in London, the film was released theatrically in April 2007.

== Plot ==
Kiranjit Ahluwalia (Aishwarya Rai), a Punjabi woman, marries Deepak Ahluwalia (Naveen Andrews) in an arranged marriage and moves to Southall, UK with him to be closer to his family. Initially he seems caring and affectionate towards her but soon enough the true colors of her husband begin to show as Deepak gradually reveals a darker, threatening, and even sociopathic side of himself. After enduring ten years of abuse and having two children with him, Kiranjit, unable to bear the brutality and repeated rapes at the hands of her husband any longer, sets fire to his feet while he is sleeping, unintentionally killing him. Charged with murder, her case comes to the notice of a group of South Asian social workers running an under funded organization called the Southall Black Sisters.

Kiranjit is sentenced to life imprisonment with possibility of parole in 12 years. She befriends her cellmate, a White woman named Veronica Scott (Miranda Richardson), who teaches her English. Veronica is also friends with several girls in the prison and stands up for Kiranjit against the local prison bully, Doreen (Lorraine Bruce). Veronica enlists her brother, Edward Foster (Robbie Coltrane), a highly respected Queen's Counsel, to aide in Kiranjit's appeal. Edward, in turn, realizes Kiranjit's importance to his sister and the importance of her case. His sister's request has additional meaning given that Veronica would not let him help her with her own appeal due to their on-off relationship since childhood.

Before Kiranjit's appeal hearing the Southall Black Sisters bring her plight to the attention of the media by organizing rallies to gather public support for her freedom. She is ultimately freed by the judicial system in a landmark case called R v Ahluwalia, redefining provocation in cases of battered women in the UK.

== Cast ==
- Aishwarya Rai as Kiranjit Ahluwalia
- Miranda Richardson as Veronica Scott
- Robbie Coltrane as Edward Foster
- Naveen Andrews as Deepak Ahluwalia
- Ray Panthaki as Ravi
- Nandita Das as Radha Dalal
- Raji James as Anil
- Karen David as Asha
- Claire Louise Amias as Young Nurse
- Lorraine Bruce as Doreen
- Maxine Finch as Lula
- Nicholas Irons as PC O'Connell
- Wendy Albiston as Guard Miller
- Judith Jacob as Guard Taylor
- Deborah Moore as Jackie
- Guy Siner as Prosecutor
- Rebecca Pidgeon as Miriam Taylor, Defence lawyer
- Steve McFadden as DS Ron Meyers
- Shaheen Khan as Jamila
- Rahul Nath as Doctor

== Release ==
This film was screened in the Marché du Film Cannes Film Market during the Cannes Film Festival in May 2006. Aishwarya Rai was present with director Jag Mundhra to promote the film through press conferences and parties. In June, the film opened the 2006 International Indian Film Academy Film Festival in Dubai. The screening was attended by Bollywood personalities including Amitabh Bachchan and Shabana Azmi, as well as by international media.

== Reception ==
On Rotten Tomatoes the film has a rating of 29 percent out of 100. View London gave it two stars out of five, saying: "Provoked is just about worth seeing for its important subject matter and for Aishwarya Rai's performance but it's a real struggle at times, due to the astonishingly inept direction." The BBC website, giving it three stars, claimed that "Provoked avoids sentimentality and illustrates how one woman's bravery helped fuel a nationwide crusade and irrevocably altered British laws on domestic violence".

Derek Elley of Variety stated: "With Rai dignified in a largely reactive role, it's the playing by thesps like Richardson and Das, both excellent, that broadens the pic's emotional palette. Main weakness is that, in the flashbacks, Deepak's role has little backgrounding, and his violent outbursts are given no psychological underpinnings. Picture is more a quality meller, with clearly defined heroes and villains, than a slice of social realism. But for viewers prepared to go with the flow, it works at a gut, movie-movie level". The Times, which gave a three-star rating, noted that "The key to the picture is its resonant message: everyone should see it to be reminded that domestic violence will never be acceptable, and that the law will now not tolerate it. Mundra thankfully gets Aishwarya Rai to drop her annoying Bollywood mannerisms and surrounds her with sturdy, mainly British, supporting actors. The result is that the actress finally delivers a performance which is not only moving but worthy of the fiery material". The UK's Film4 rated it four stars, calling it "A bold story, told with sensitivity and compassion."

Rediff gave the film three stars: "Provoked is an important story which definitely needs to be told. What is disheartening is the way it is. Sure, the treatment is realistic, production values are good, and the acting is mostly commendable - but the screenplay (Carl Austin, Rahila Gupta) is shockingly superficial. [...] Aishwarya Rai, on her part, is sincerity personified. No make-up, pretty clothes or even a smile adorn her naturally gorgeous disposition. But those eyes play their part. With changing circumstances her big blue-green brimming eyes look shocked, grieved, frightened, confused and relieved. Her effort to speak in fluent Punjabi is truly impressive." CNN-IBN's Rajeev Masand gave a 'Good' verdict and stated that "In all honesty, Provoked wouldn't work if it wasn't for two performances that uplift the film considerably. It's a sensitive film about domestic abuse. The real star of Provoked is Aishwarya Rai who delivers a performance that is appropriately restrained. [...] I'll say here, she surprises you with what she strums up. It's a performance that penetrates into your consciousness because she plays it with a slow-burning passion rather than an all-out flourish. This is easily one of her better acting jobs."

Daily News and Analysis, which also gave a three-star rating, said: "With a story like this it would have been very easy to go overboard, it is to director Jag Mundhra's credit that he keeps a tight leash on the melodrama aspect of the story. Aishwarya Rai plays the battered wife in what is undoubtedly one of her best performances to date. Starting as the young, coy and simpering wife, Kiranjit, who is abused to such an extent that she sets her husband Deepak (Naveen Andrews) on fire after a particularly brutal beating one night, Rai convincingly goes through the various stages of shock, bewilderment, remorse and finally vindication." The Times of India stated that "It's Aishwarya's film from the word go. The story is powerful, yes, but the passion and the pain finds articulation through Aishwarya's sensitive rendition of the protagonist. From the very first shot, the actor grabs the role by its horns and shakes it around to sculpt a moving portrayal of a battered woman who happens to chance upon a rare source of inner strength to fight against domestic terror and terrifying traditions that demand silence from a wife, come what may." Critic Subhash K Jha wrote "Provoked answers the complicated question of domestic disharmony with a deft and direct approach to the question of a woman's place in the man's scream [sic] of things. Full credit to Aishwarya Rai for plunging deep into a part that she plays straight from her heart. There're moments in the narrative where Rai melts your heart like an ice-cream cone left out in the sun for too long."

The Indian Express gave four stars, stating: "It's a film of substance. A film based on real life. A film that would move many. A film that would make a difference in many a lives. Aishwarya has done a good job. She has definitely brought forth the trauma and torture borne by the character. And the absence of her overdone make-up and glamorous good-looks has made her look more attractive (!) and fit into the role well."

After seeing the film, Patel is said to have told the Observer newspaper: "I cringe a bit because I was so closely involved. Sometimes I think people should rise to the challenge of reflecting real life better. My view is that the reality is far more interesting."

Rahila Gupta, who co-wrote Circle of Light and the Provoked script, stated: "It's a shame that film is an artistic form in which you have to make a fair amount of compromises to make it happen." She criticised the film's characterisation as "one dimensional" and the portrayal of Kiranjit Ahluwalia's husband as an alcoholic.

In the film Kiranjit Ahluwalia is portrayed as a middle-class homemaker instead of a factory worker as she was in reality, Pragna Patel and Rahila Gupta's characters are merged to create one person (played by the Indian actress Nandita Das), and Americanised legal terminology is used rather than the actual British. The director Jagmohan 'Jag' Mundhra, in his defence, said: "Even if you tell a true story, a true story is never really a true story. How do you define the truth? None of us were really there and obviously the recollections of people who were there have changed now. Ultimately I do have to tell an engaging story. If I can't tell an engaging story no matter what cause is at stake, nobody will see it."

== Box office ==
The film did well at the UK box-office, being described as "a winner" by ApunKaChoice.com.

== Music ==
Provoked

Soundtrack album by A. R. Rahman
- Released: 1 March 2007
- Recorded: Panchathan Record Inn and AM Studios

A. R. Rahman chronology
Sajni (2006)	Provoked (2007)	Sivaji (2007)

The score and theme song of the film were composed by Academy Award-winning Indian composer A. R. Rahman. The theme song, Alive, composed by Rahman, was written and performed by Karen David. The other tracks were by Karen David; according to her blog, these songs were co-written with Rahman, but Rahman has confirmed that he composed only a single track for the film. Another version of Alive was recorded by Shreya Ghoshal but was not featured in the movie or officially released. The Hindi version of Alive was named Zindagi and was written by Mayur Puri.

Track	Duration	Notes
Alive	4:20	(performed by Karen David)
Zindagi	4:20	(written by Mayur Puri)
Carry Me Home	3:52	
Save You	4:29	
Shillong	4:52	
