= Mumtaz (film) =

Kannada movie

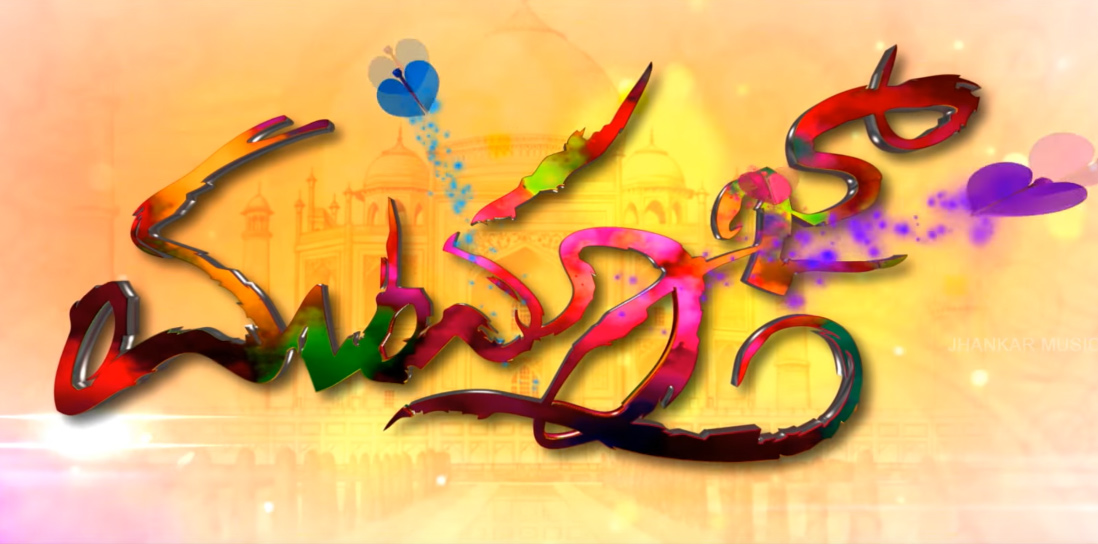
- Film poster
- Directed by: Raghava Murali
- Produced by: Narasimha Murthy
- Starring: Dharma Keerthiraj; Sharmila Mandre
- Edited by: Vinod Manohar
- Music by: KB Praveen
- Release date: 30 October 2015
- Country: India
- Language: Kannada

Mumtaz is a 2015 Indian Kannada-language film directed by Raghava Murali, starring Dharma Keerthiraj and Sharmila Mandre in lead roles.

== Cast ==
- Dharma Keerthiraj as Ranjith
- Sharmila Mandre as Anjali
- Keerthiraj
- Chikkanna
- M. S. Umesh
- Rockline Sudhakar
- Darshan (cameo appearance)
- Shille Manjunath

== Music ==
Mumtaz

Soundtrack album by KB Praveen
- Released: 2015
- Recorded: 2015
- Genre: Feature film soundtrack
- Length: 23:06
- Language: Kannada

Official audio
- Mumtaz - Full Album on YouTube

Track listing
No.	Title	Singer(s)	Length
1.	"Ninna Daarili"	KB Praveen	3:42
2.	"Jagave Barali"	Naveed Muntasir	4:19
3.	"Lovvigu Baatligu"	Shashank Sheshagiri	4:11
4.	"Kannolagondu"	Anuradha Bhat	3:55
5.	"Kannedure Kaleduhode"	Hemanth Kumar	4:40
6.	"Preethiya Tottilu"	KB Praveen	1:16
7.	"Janumavelu"	Archana Ravi	1:23
Total length:			23:06

== Reception ==
=== Critical response ===
A Sharadhaa of The New Indian Express wrote "The 19-year-old music director Praveen is promising but has a long way to go. Of course, age is on his side. Chikkanna adds comedy in a subtle way. Better go mum and ignore the ‘taz’". Shashiprasad SM of Deccan Chronicle scored the film at 1 out of 5 stars and says "cameo appearance by Darshan fails to give a boost to the super-slow love story. Will the hero finally express his love before it’s too late? If still willing to watch, then go before Mumtaz disappears from your nearby screens. However, this one could help those who are suffering from sleep disorders, as it proposes a sound sleep without fail". The Times of India scored the film at 2 out of 5 stars and says "Watch this film if you're a sucker for age-old romantic tales where lovers play hide and seek because of the script, making one wonder whether they realize they are looking for each other despite being in front of each other. Contrieved much?"
