= Naanum Single Thaan =

2021 Indian film

- Film poster
- Directed by: R. Gopi
- Produced by: Jayakumar; Punnagai Poo Gheetha; Sharmiela Mandre
- Starring: Attakathi Dinesh; Deepti Sati; Rajendran
- Cinematography: David Anandaraj
- Edited by: Aadhi
- Music by: Hitesh Manjunath
- Production company: Three is a Company
- Release date: 12 February 2021
- Running time: 123 minutes
- Country: India
- Language: Tamil

Naanum Single Thaan (transl. I am also Single) is a 2021 Indian Tamil-language romantic comedy film directed by R. Gopi, starring Dinesh and Deepti Sati. It was produced by Jayakumar and Punnagai Poo Gheetha and co-produced by Sharmiela Mandre. It was released on 12 February 2021.

== Plot ==
Udhay is a tattoo artist who has ‘Virgin Boy’ and the names of Trisha and Nayanthara tattooed on his body. After several failed attempts at wooing women, this gang of ‘Single 90s kids’ come across Swetha. What follows is two hours of Udhay, and his friends, stalking her and forcing her to ‘love’ him, and insufferable sermons about this toxic hero helping the heroine "understand his feelings."

== Cast ==
- Dinesh as Udhay
- Deepti Sati as Swetha
- Rajendran as Mr Love
- Lakshmi Priya as Priya
- Manobala as Udhay's father
- Rama as Udhay's mother
- Kathir
- Vikash Sampath
- Selva

== Production ==
Director Gopi wrote the film's script with Vignesh Shivan and Nayanthara in mind for the lead role, but the pair turned down the offer. Dinesh was thus signed on to play a Nayanthara fan in the film. After a guest appearance in Solo (2017), Deepti Sati made her first lead appearance in Tamil cinema. Rajendran was cast as a 'love guru', while Manobala also starred in the film. The film was produced by Punnagai Poo Gheetha and Jayakumar.

The film was predominantly shot in London during mid-2019, while remaining portions were completed in Chennai.

== Soundtrack ==
Soundtrack was composed by Hitesh Manjunath.

- Desi Lady – Lady Kash, Saisharan
- Idhuvarai – Chinmayi, Nivas
- Maamazhai – Armaan Malik

== Release ==
The film was released across theatres in Tamil Nadu on 12 February 2021, coinciding with Valentine's Day weekend. The film received predominantly negative reviews from critics, with a reviewer from Cinema Express noting "Naanum Single Thaan neither has good comedy nor good acting. All it has is an illogical love story at the heart of it. It’s a carelessly crafted story that normalises an emotionally unhealthy equation." A reviewer from the Times of India wrote "Even if we are just a month into the new year, one can safely predict that Naanum Single Thaan is certain to figure in the list of terrible films of 2021".
