= Dhan Dhana Dhan =

- Directed by: Ramnath
- Produced by: Santhosh Singh; Wasim. D
- Starring: Prem; Sharmila Mandre
- Music by: Sai Karthik
- Release date: 24 June 2011
- Country: India
- Language: Kannada

Dhan Dhana Dhan is a 2011 Indian Kannada film in the romance genre starring Prem and Sharmila Mandre. The film is directed by Ramnath Rigvedi. K. Sai Karthik is the music director of the film. Santhosh Singh has jointly produced the film with Wasim. D. This film is a remake of Hum Kisise Kum Naheen.

== Cast ==
- Prem as Prem
- Sharmila Mandre as Charmi
- Ravishankar Gowda
- Adi Lokesh

== Soundtrack ==
Sai Karthik has set the tunes to the lyrics of Kaviraj and Ramanarayan

No.	Title	Performer(s)	Length
1.	"Kaavana"	Santhosh
2.	"Ninna Kanda"	Sai Karthik, Suvarna Rathod
3.	"Full Bottlu"	L. N. Shastry, Santhosh
4.	"Dhan Dhana Dhan"	Shaan, Anuradha Bhat
5.	"Kavana"	Santhosh, Anuradha Bhat

== Reception ==
=== Critical response ===
B S Srivani from Deccan Herald wrote "Adi Lokesh fails to bring out the vulnerability of a don in love, unlike Sanjay Dutt. Prem never settles down, while Sharmila looks pretty but little else. Ravishankar’s loud outburst can only sustain interest to a point. Dhan Dhana Dhan won’t be missed at all. What a pity!". Shruti Indira Lakshminarayana from Rediff.com scored the film at 1.5 out of 5 stars and says "Director Ramanath Rigvedi, who had a winner in Budhhivanta, falls flat this time. Dhan Dhana Dhan is a failed attempt as a family entertainer. Look elsewhere for movie, masti and magic!" A critic from News18 India wrote "How Prem uses his intelligence to thwart off the attempts of the doctor and the mafia forms the climax of the story. "Dhan Dhana Dhan" is a tedious watch, better avoid it".
