= Gaalipata 2 =

2022 film directed by Yogaraj Bhat

- Promotional poster
- Directed by: Yogaraj Bhat
- Written by: Yogaraj Bhat
- Produced by: M. Ramesh Reddy
- Starring: Ganesh; Anant Nag; Diganth; Pawan Kumar; Vaibhavi Shandilya; Samyuktha; Sharmiela Mandre
- Cinematography: Santhosh Rai Pathaje
- Edited by: Deepu S. Kumar
- Music by: Arjun Janya
- Production company: Suraj Production
- Distributed by: KVN Productions
- Release date: 12 August 2022
- Running time: 151 minutes
- Country: India
- Language: Kannada
- Box office: ₹35 crore

Gaalipata 2 is a 2022 Indian Kannada-language romantic comedy film written and directed by Yogaraj Bhat. Despite the title, the film is not a sequel to 2008 film Gaalipata and is a namesake sequel. It features an ensemble cast consisting of Ganesh, Anant Nag, Diganth, Pawan Kumar, Vaibhavi Shandilya, Samyuktha, and Sharmiela Mandre.

Ganesh and Bhat were collaborating for the fourth time with this film, while it was the fifth film for Diganth with the director. Director Pawan Kumar of Lucia fame, who had worked with Bhat earlier as a screenwriter and an actor in Manasaare (2009) and Pancharangi (2010), also faced the camera. It was released in theaters on 12 August 2022. Subsequently, it was released for OTT on 5 October 2022, through ZEE5.

== Premise ==
Gani, 'Mugilpete' Diganth, and Bhushan are college friends, who return to Neer Kote, Malnad, to visit their ailing Kannada teacher Kishore Meshtru. Kishore seeks the trio's help to search for his long lost son Revanth aka Appu. How the trio help Meshtru in finding Appu forms the crux of the plot.

== Cast ==
- Ganesh as Gani
- Anant Nag as Kishore aka Meshtru
- Diganth as Mugilpete Diganth
- Pawan Kumar as Bhushan
- Sharmiela Mandre as Sharmila
- Vaibhavi Shandilya as Swetha
- Samyuktha as Anupama
- Rangayana Raghu as Bhairegowda, Gani's father
- Sudha Belawadi as Kumuda, Gani's mother
- Prakash Thuminad as Ramanna
- Srinath as Neerkote College Principal
- Padmaja Rao as Padmaja, Kumuda's friend
- Nishvika Naidu as Nishvika (Cameo)
- Vijay Suriya as Revantha aka Appu (Cameo)
- Vihaan Ganesh as Young Appu and Revantha's son (Cameo)
- Bullet Prakash (Cameo)
- Jayant Kaikini (Cameo)

== Production ==
The film was produced by Ramesh Reddy of Suraj Production. The cinematography was done by Santhosh Rai Pathaje, and the music was composed by Arjun Janya. The team started shooting on 2 December 2019, and completed a major chunk of the shooting in and around Kudremukh over almost 30 days. Further production schedules were delayed due to COVID-19. The filming was completed in October 2021.

== Soundtrack ==
All music is composed by Arjun Janya.

Track listing
No.	Title	Lyrics	Singer(s)	Length
1.	"Gaalipata 2 Title track"	Yograj Bhat	Tippu	3:37
2.	"Nanaadada Matellava"	Jayant Kaikini	Sonu Nigam	3:59
3.	"Neenu Bagehariyada hadu"	Jayant Kaikini	Nihal Tauro	4:24
4.	"Exam Song"	Yograj Bhat	Vijay Prakash, Arjun Janya, Yograj Bhat	3:24
5.	"Devle Devle"	Yogaraj Bhat	Vijay Prakash	4:11
6.	"Prayashaha"	Yogaraj Bhat	Sonu Nigam	4:36
7.	"Thatherike Thayerike"	Yogaraj Bhat	Naveen Sajju	2:38
Total length:				26:54

== Release ==
=== Theatrical ===
The film was theatrically released on 12 August 2022.

=== Home media ===
The satellite and digital streaming rights of the film were acquired by Zee Kannada and ZEE5.

== Reception ==
=== Box-office ===
The film did a pre-release business of around ₹8 crores by the sale of digital, satellite and audio rights. The first day gross was reported to be between ₹15 crores to ₹20 crores. The movie collected around ₹10 crore on Day 2. The movie collected ₹5 crore each on Day 3 & Day 4 - taking the total gross to ₹35 crore. However, the trade estimated ₹25 crores to be the 5-day gross with the final collections to be ₹33.20 crores at the end of 2 weeks.
