= Prakash Belawadi =

Indian film director and actor (born 1961)

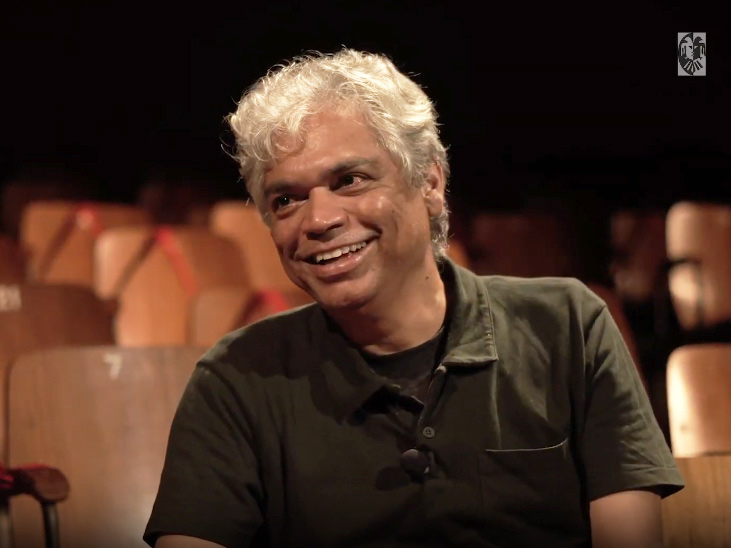
- Belawadi during the making of theatrical play of Parva in 2021
- Born: 1961 (age 64–65); Bangalore, Mysore State, India
- Education: UVCE, Bengaluru
- Occupations: Actor; filmmaker; screenwriter; activist; journalist
- Years active: 1972–present
- Organisation: Loksatta
- Notable work: Madras Cafe; Airlift; The Tashkent Files; The Kashmir Files
- Spouse: Chandrika Belawadi
- Children: 2
- Mother: Bhargavi Narayan
- Relatives: Sudha Belawadi (sister); Samyukta Hornad (niece)

Prakash Belawadi is an Indian actor, director and screenwriter, who works predominantly in English, Kannada and Hindi theatre, films and television. He is also a theatre teacher, activist and a journalist. He hails from Bengaluru. He has participated in many seminars, conferences and festivals in India and abroad. He is a motivational speaker at events and TEDx conferences. He is also a mentor with the founding team of BISFF (Bengaluru International Short Film Festival) since 2010.

Belawadi prefers stage acting to film acting.

== Early life ==
Belawadi was born into a family of theatre artists in Bangalore, in the erstwhile Mysore State (now Karnataka). His father, Belawadi Nanjundaiah Narayan (1929–2003) popularly known as Makeup Nani, was a personality in Kannada theatre, who also appeared in films, and worked as a make-up artist. His mother, Bhargavi Narayan, was a renowned film and theatre artiste. His siblings Sujata, Sudha and Pradeep, and nieces and nephews are also variously connected with theatre, music, television and cinema. He completed his elementary education at Mahila Seva Samaja, higher school education in National High School, following which he completed his pre-university course at National College, Bangaluru. He obtained a degree in mechanical engineering from University of Visvesvaraya College of Engineering in 1983.

== Awards ==
- Prakash Belawadi's debut film Stumble, which he wrote and directed, won the National Award for Best Film in the English language, 2003.
- He was conferred ‘Pratibha Bhushan’ in 2003 by the Government of Karnataka for his contribution to culture.
- He was recipient of Karnataka Nataka Academy Award (2011–12) for his contribution to English and Kannada-language theatre. and
- He was awarded the ‘Pride of Karnataka’ by Bangalore Round Table (2015).
- He was the ‘Varshada Kannadiga’ (2015) in the field of entertainment, conferred by News 18 Kannada.
- He was given Helpmann Award, Australia (2019) for Best Actor, Male in the play 'Counting and Cracking', Belvoir St. Theatre, Sydney".

== International ==
Belawadi as mentioned earlier has participated in many seminars, conferences and festivals in India and abroad, including the Beyond Bollywood conference at the Gothenburg International Film Festival, 2010 the Performing Arts Market conference in Seoul, 2011 the 50th Theatertreffen – annual theatre festival meet at Berlin, 2013 and the seminar and exhibition, ‘Nature – A Good Idea’ at Trollhättan, Sweden in 2014. He has been faculty for film courses in Sweden and Istanbul, Turkey.

== Partial filmography ==
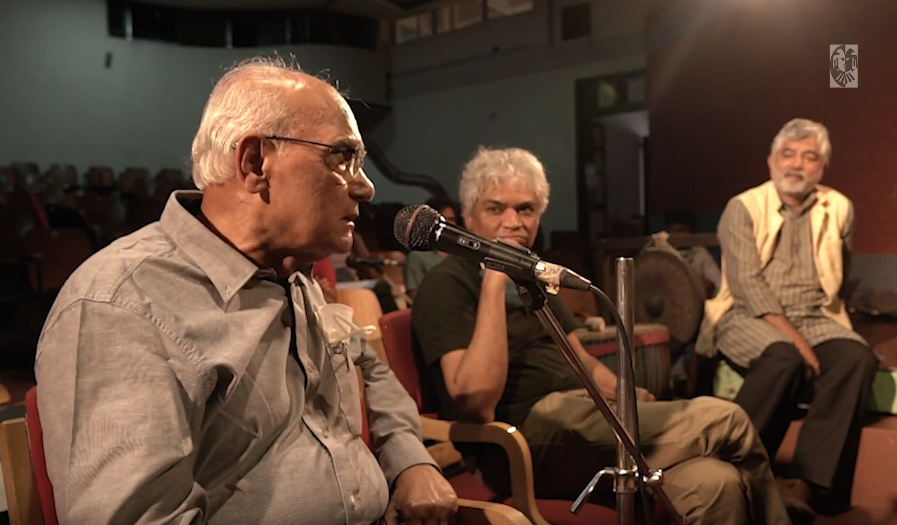
S. L. Bhyrappa (left) and Prakash Belavadi (middle) discussing about the making of theatrical play on novel Parva

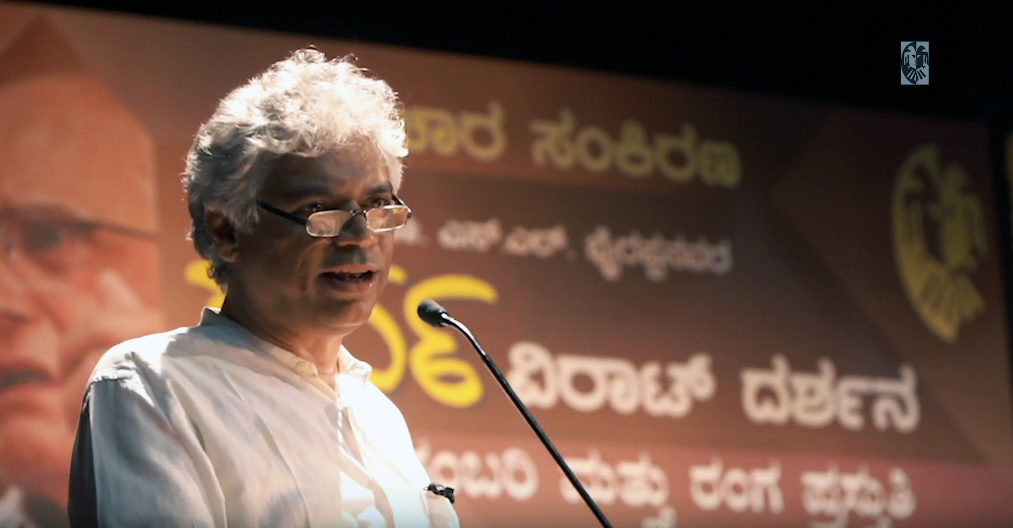
Prakash Belavadi, addressing the audience

=== Films ===
Year	Title	Role	Language	Notes
1973	Abachurina Postofficu		Kannada	Child actor
1978	Muyyi		Kannada	Child actor
1999	Kanooru Heggadithi	Obe Gowda	Kannada	
2001	Mathadana		Kannada	
2013	Madras Cafe	Bala	Hindi	
2014	Youngistaan	Murli Mukundan	Hindi	
2015	Benkipatna	Limba Rama	Kannada	
2015	Uttama Villain	Dr. D. S.	Tamil	
2015	Aatagara	Dr. Chetan Bhagawat	Kannada	
2015	Fading Red	ACP Ravikumar	Kannada	Short film
2015	Kendasampige	DCP Suryakanth	Kannada	
2015	Talvar	Ramshankar Pillai	Hindi	
2016	Wazir	DCP	Hindi	
2016	Last Bus	Sandy	Kannada	
2016	Airlift	George Kutty	Hindi	
2016	Kiragoorina Gayyaligalu	A Government Officer	Kannada	
2016	Ishtakamya	Vikranth	Kannada	
2016	Te3n	Kumar	Hindi	
2017	Take Off	Rajan Menon	Malayalam	
2017	Aake	PK	Kannada	
2017	Meri Pyaari Bindu	Bindu's father	Hindi	
2017	Solo	Vishnu	Malayalam	Bilingual film
2017	Solo	Vishnu	Tamil	Bilingual film
2017	Dayavittu Gamanisi		Kannada	
2017	Aval	Joshua	Tamil	Bilingual film
2017	The House Next Door	Joshua	Hindi	Bilingual film
2017	Mufti	Social worker	Kannada	
2018	Brihaspathi		Kannada	
2018	Sanju	Kamal Kishore "KK" Arora	Hindi	
2019	The Accidental Prime Minister	M. K. Narayanan	Hindi	
2019	Thackeray	George Fernandes	Hindi	
2019	The Least of These: The Graham Staines Story	Kedar Mishra	English	
2019	Natasaarvabhowma	Shruthi's uncle	Kannada	
2019	The Tashkent Files	GK Ananthasuresh	Hindi	
2019	Saaho	Shinde	Telugu	Bilingual film
2019	Saaho	Shinde	Hindi	Bilingual film
2019	Katha Sangama	Sathya Murthy	Kannada	
2020	Shakuntala Devi	Bishaw Mitra Mani	Hindi	
2020	Soorarai Pottru	Prakash Babu	Tamil	
2020	Yuvarathnaa	Shatrughan Salimath	Kannada	
2021	100	Sadanand	Kannada	
2022	One Cut Two Cut	Pruthiraj	Kannada	
2022	The Kashmir Files	Dr. Mahesh Kumar	Hindi	
2022	India Lockdown	M. Nageshwar Rao	Hindi	
2022	Hope	Vijayasimha	Kannada	
2022	Head Bush		Kannada	
2023	Pathaan	Dr. Sahani	Hindi	
2023	Mysore Masala: The UFO Incident	Dr. Satyaprakash	Kannada	
2023	Pentagon		Kannada	Anthology film; segment Kamaturam Na Bhayam Na Lajja
2023	Savitri	Dr. Jayaprakash	Kannada	
2024	O2	Dr. Mrutyunjay	Kannada	
2024	The Judgement		Kannada	
2024	Sarfira		Hindi	
2024	My Hero		Kannada	
2024	Baby John	DGP Yashraj Mukherjee	Hindi	
2025	Fateh	Aayappa	Hindi	
2025	Thandel	Jailer	Telugu	
2025	Yuddhakaanda Chapter 2	Robert D'Souza	Kannada	
2026	Parasakthi	Chief Minister of Madras State	Tamil	
2026	Patriot		Malayalam	

=== Television ===
Year	Name	Role	Language	Network	Notes
2018	Smoke	Bhau	Hindi	Eros Now	
2020	High	Dr. Shridhar Roy	Hindi	MX Player	
2021	Mumbai Diaries 26/11	Dr. Mani Subramaniam	Hindi	Amazon Prime Video	recurring role
2022	Humble Politician Nograj	Krishna Gundu Bala (KGB)	Kannada	Voot Select	Main cast
2026	Space Gen: Chandrayaan	Sudarshan Ramaiah	Hindi	JioHotstar	

=== As writer and director ===
Year	Title	Credited as		Language	Notes	Ref.
Year	Title	Writer	Director	Language	Notes	Ref.
2001	Garva	Yes	Yes	Kannada	Television serial	
2003	Stumble	Yes	Yes	English	Included in Doordarshan's Best of Indian Cinema series	
2023	Mandala: The UFO Incident	Screenplay	No	Kannada		

== Activism ==
Belawadi is one of the founding members of Citizens for Bengaluru, an active platform for people to engage with the city government to make it accountable to citizens. Belawadi curates ‘Rotary Avani’, an annual ecology festival in Bengaluru between 22 April, International Mother Earth Day and 5 June, World Environment Day, to create awareness about the environment, in The Five Elements – Earth, Water, Fire, Air and Sky, so that people, together with government, industry, business and citizens can participate in initiatives to improve urban ecological health.
