= M. S. Umesh =

Indian actor (1945–2025)

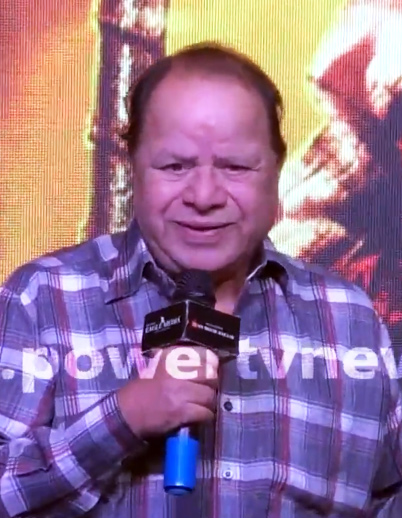
- Umesh in 2023
- Born: 24 April 1945; Mysore, Kingdom of Mysore, India
- Died: 30 November 2025 (aged 80); Bengaluru, Karnataka, India
- Occupations: Actor; producer; director
- Years active: 1960–2023

Mysore Srikantayya Umesh (24 April 1945 – 30 November 2025), popularly known as M. S. Umesh or simply Umesh, was an Indian actor in Kannada cinema who had a career spanning over six decades. After having featured in several stage shows as an actor in his childhood, he was hired for the lead character in the film Makkala Rajya (1960). Thereafter, he acted in over 350 feature films. A brother of actor M.S. Sathya, Umesh was renowned for his unique dialogue delivery, facial expressions and comedic timing. He was also the music director of the television serial Jeevanada Jenahanigalu, produced by Sundar Raj.

== Background ==
Umesh was born on 24 April 1945 to A. L. Srikantayya and Nanjamma. His basic schooling was in Mysore where he was drawn towards theatre and stage performances. At the age of 4, he joined the popular theatre troupe run by K. Hirannaiah. Soon he joined the more famous Gubbi Veeranna's company and performed various roles as a child artist. It was in one such stage plays that the then assistant director Puttanna Kanagal noticed him and recommended his name for B. R. Panthulu's next film.

Umesh's first appearance as an actor on the silver screen was with Makkala Rajya in 1960 directed by veteran actor-director B. R. Panthulu for his Padmini films banner. This was also the second film produced by M. V. Rajamma. This film also featured veteran Tamil actor Sivaji Ganesan in a cameo role.

== Career ==
After the superhit debut film, Umesh who was 15, could no longer feature in child roles nor in adult roles, either. He moved back to stage shows and took up jobs which included some back stage labour works. He struggled to find himself a good role in drama plays too. It was then that Puttanna Kanagal again came to his rescue and cast him in his anthology film Katha Sangama (1977). His portrayal as "Thimmarayi" in the Munithaayi episode featuring Rajinikanth and Aarathi fetched him multiple laurels including the Karnataka State Film Award for Best Supporting Actor. Starting from here, Umesh was cast in a series of films from the 1980s to the 2000s. Some of his best remembered films include Nagara Hole (1978), Guru Shishyaru (1981), Anupama (1981), Kaamana Billu (1983), Apoorva Sangama (1984), Shruthi Seridaaga (1987), Shravana Banthu (1984), Malaya Marutha (1986), Golmaal Radhakrishna (1990), Neenu Nakkare Haalu Sakkare (1993), Venkata in Sankata (2007) to name a few.

Umesh's comedy role as "Sithapathi" in the 1990 comedy film, Golmaal Radhakrishna starring Ananth Nag in the lead is considered one of the best comedy roles in Kannada cinema. His catchy dialogue "Apaartha Madkondbitro Eno" is widely acclaimed among the masses. His role as an old toothless widow grandmother in Ramesh Aravind's directorial Venkata in Sankata was also widely appreciated.

== Death ==
Umesh died from liver cancer in a Bengaluru hospital on 30 November 2025, at the age of 80.

== Selected filmography ==
- Makkala Rajya (1960)
- Katha Sangama (1976)...Thimmaraya
- Nagarahole (1977)
- Bhagyavantharu (1977)
- Pavana Ganga (1977)...Stage actor (uncredited)
- Savalige Saval (1978)
- Vasantha Lakshmi (1978)
- Thappida Thala (1978)
- Kiladi Jodi (1978)
- Putani Agent 123 (1979)
- I Love You (1979)
- Mutthu Ondu Mutthu (1979)
- Madhu Chandra (1979)...Hanuma
- Prema Anuraga (1980)
- Haavina Hede (1981)
- Guru Shishyaru (1981)
- Bhoomige Banda Bhagavantha (1981)
- Bangarada Mane (1981)
- Anupama (1981)
- Antha (1981)
- Suvarna Sethuve (1982)
- Prema Mathsara (1982)
- Nanna Devaru (1982)
- Haalu Jenu (1982)
- Simha Garjane (1983)
- Kalluveene Nudiyithu (1983)
- Kaamana Billu (1983)
- Ibbani Karagithu (1983)
- Hasida Hebbuli (1983)
- Gandharva Giri (1983)
- Eradu Nakshatragalu (1983)
- Bhakta Prahlada (1983)
- Avala Neralu (1983)
- Pralayanthaka (1984)
- Prachanda Kulla (1984)
- Gandu Bherunda (1984)
- Shravana Banthu (1984)
- Benki Birugali (1984)
- Apoorva Sangama (1984)
- Nanna Prathigne (1985)...Chenna
- Malaya Marutha (1986)
- Shruthi Seridaaga (1987)
- Challenge Gopalakrishna (1990)
- Golmaal Radhakrishna (1990)...Sithapathi
- Rani Maharani (1990)
- Raja Kempu Roja (1990)
- Policena Hendthi (1990)
- Neenu Nakkare Haalu Sakkare (1991)
- Golmaal Part 2 (1991)...Sithapathi
- Gauri Ganesha (1991)
- Kollur Kala (1991)
- Hatyakanda (1991)
- Banni Ondsala Nodi (1992)
- Ksheera Sagara (1992)
- Gruhalakshmi (1992)
- Megha Mandara (1992)
- Sahasi (1992)
- Kaliyuga Seethe (1992)
- Prema Sangama (1992)
- Tharle Nan Maga (1992)
- Sapthapadi (1992)...Krishna Murthy
- Ondu Cinema Kathe (1992)
- Belliyappa Bangarappa (1992)
- Mallige Hoove (1992)
- Undu Hoda Kondu Hoda (1992)...Katra
- Aakasmika (1993)...Sridhar
- Server Somanna (1993)
- Kalyana Rekhe (1993)
- Time Bomb (1994)
- Gold Medal (1994)...'Buddhivanta'
- Megha Maale (1994)
- Hello Sister (1995)
- Himapatha (1995)
- Geluvina Saradara (1996)
- Hello Yama (1998)
- Nannaseya Hoove (1999)
- Hagalu Vesha (2000)
- Sundara Purusha (2000)
- Astra (2000)
- Balagalittu Olage Baa (2002)
- Santhosha (2004)
- Jokefalls (2004)
- Pandu Ranga Vittala (2005)
- Seven O' Clock (2006)
- Shubham (2006)
- Savira Mettilu (2006)
- Sajni (2007)
- Ganesha Matthe Banda (2008)
- Mussanjemaatu (2008)
- Venkata in Sankata (2009)
- Crazy Kutumba (2010)
- Aithalakkadi (2010)
- Jackie (2010)
- Mathond Madhuvena (2011)
- Gun (2011)
- Rambo (2012)
- Lucky (2012)
- Chandra (2013)
- Chella Pilli (2013)
- Navarangi (2014)
- Gandhiji Kanasu (2014)
- Pungi Daasa (2014)
- Siddhartha (2015)
- Ond Chance Kodi (2015)
- Charlie (2015)
- Mumtaz (2015)
- CBI Sathya (2016)
- Mahaveera Machideva (2016)
- Thale Bachkolli Powder Hakkolli (2016)
- Badmaash (2016)
- No Entry (2016)
- John Jani Janardhan (2016)
- Sri Omkara Ayyappane (2016)
- Once More Kaurava (2017)
- Bhootayyana Mommaga Ayyu (2018)
- Kumari 21F (2018)
- Paradesi C/o London (2018)
- Daredevil Musthafa (2023)

== Awards ==
- 1975 – Karnataka State Film Award for Best Supporting Actor – Katha Sangama
- 2013 – Karnataka Nataka Akademy Award – for his contribution to the professional theatre.
