= Mirattal =

2012 Indian film by R. Madhesh

- Theatrical release poster
- Directed by: R. Madhesh
- Screenplay by: R. Madhesh
- Story by: Kona Venkat (unc.); Gopimohan (unc.)
- Based on: Dhee
- Produced by: Sunanda Murali Manohar
- Starring: Vinay; Sharmila Mandre
- Cinematography: D. Kannan
- Edited by: Vivek Harshan
- Music by: Pravin Mani
- Production company: Majestic Multimedia Limited
- Release date: 2 August 2012
- Running time: 137 minutes
- Country: India
- Language: Tamil

Mirattal (transl. Threatening) is a 2012 Indian Tamil-language action comedy film directed by R. Madhesh starring Vinay, Sharmila Mandre and Prabhu in the lead roles, Pradeep Rawat, Pandiarajan, and Santhanam in supporting roles, and Rishi in a cameo. A remake of the Telugu film Dhee, it was released on 2 August 2012.

== Plot ==
Babloo is a happy-go-lucky person who gets sent by his father to Shankar Dhadha, a big don in the city. Shankar has a vengeance on Soori. Babloo meets Deepika, Shankar's sister, and love blossoms between them. One day, they get married in a temple, and some goons sent by Soori attack Babloo and Deepika. Babloo fights them, and Shankar comes there. Comedy takes place as Deepika's engagement occurs, when suddenly, some goons kidnap her. Shankar and Babloo kill the goons and Soori and rescue Deepika.

== Cast ==
- Vinay as Ashok (Babloo)
- Sharmila Mandre as Deepika
- Prabhu as Shankar Dhadha
- Rishi as Gautham (cameo)
- Pradeep Rawat as Soori
- Pandiarajan as Narayanan; Babloo's father
- Santhanam as Chari iyengar
- Mansoor Ali Khan as Shankar's father
- Ganja Karuppu as Kathi
- Uma as Rajalakshmi;Babloo's mother
- Yuvarani as Shankar's wife
- Viju Kailas as Ghani
- Bosskey as Councillor
- Master Bharath as James Cameron
- Jangiri Madhumitha
- Mahanadi Shankar
- Munnar Ramesh as Shankar Dhadha's henchman
- Bagla
- Imman Annachi as Police officer

== Production ==
Sharmila Mandre was signed on as the lead actress and made her debut in Tamil cinema. In September 2010, filming of the songs were held across regions in England with scenes filmed near castles in Richmond and Windsor in London. The team also shot at Bath, becoming the first Indian film to do so. Other locations in England where the songs where filmed include Eastbourne near Brighton, Oxfordshire and Surrey. The film's title was changed from Thillu Mullu to Mirattal in late 2011.

== Soundtrack ==
The soundtrack was composed by Pravin Mani.

Track listing
No.	Title	Singer(s)	Length
1.	"Radio Radio"	Shankar Mahadevan, Suchitra
2.	"Kalla Paravai"	Rahul Nambiar, SuVi
3.	"Whistle Poodu"	Benny Dayal & SuVi
4.	"Muga Moodi"	Aalap Raju, Shweta Mohan
5.	"Zumba"	Sunitha Sarathy
6.	"Thillu Mullu"	Pravin Mani, Benny Dayal

== Reception ==
Vivek Ramz of In.com rated the film 2.5 out of 5, and added that it "lacks in the action department but makes up for it by scoring on the entertainment front". Malathi Rangarajan of The Hindu wrote, "'Hundred per cent Thillu Mullu' is the tagline – 'and zero per cent logic' would have described Mirattal better." Pavithra Srinivasan of Rediff.com wrote, "It's almost as though director Madhesh felt compelled to direct the movie and did so, bored out of wits. Watch at your own risk". Malini Mannath of The New Indian Express wrote that "with no punch, novelty or excitement in the screenplay, the film is an average entertainer, at the most". The Times of India wrote, "Go in with minimum expectations and you will not be disappointed".
