= Mandala: The UFO Incident =

2023 film directed by Ajay Sarpeshkar

- Theatrical release poster
- Directed by: Ajay Sarpeshkar
- Screenplay by: Prakash Belawadi; Ajay Sarpeshkar
- Story by: Ajay Sarpeshkar
- Starring: Anant Nag; Prakash Belawadi; Kiran Srinivas; Sharmiela Mandre; Samyukta Hornad; Sudha Belawadi
- Cinematography: Manohar Joshi
- Edited by: Ramisetty Pavan
- Music by: Score: Jesse Clinton; Song; Raghu Dixit
- Production company: Ajay Sarpeshkar Films
- Release date: March 10, 2023
- Country: India
- Language: Kannada

Mandala: The UFO Incident (previously titled as Mysore Masala: The UFO Incident) is a 2023 Indian Kannada-language science fiction action film directed by Ajay Sarpeshkar. The film stars Anant Nag, Prakash Belawadi, Kiran Srinivas, Sharmiela Mandre, and Samyukta Hornad with Mandeep Roy, Sudha Belawadi, Neenasam Ashwath and Kiran Naik in supporting roles. The film explores science fiction as a tangent to the Roswell incident, and in an Indian context touching upon heritage and its conservation.

Being the final posthumous film of Mandeep Roy, the film was dedicated in his honour.

== Plot ==
Maya Melukote is an aerospace engineer who works for the Bharat Space Research Agency (BSRA) under Dr. Sathya Prakash. She secretly works on a mission without the knowledge of her coworkers tracing the existence of alien life. After Prakash finds out, he fires her from her job. She still continues her research and is soon abducted right in front of her boyfriend Arjun Aralikatte (who is from Houston) by a UFO when she nears Chamundi Hills, a place where aliens were reportedly clash landed prior to India's independence.

Arjun calls Prakash, who repeatedly denies Arjun's claim that she was abducted by a UFO. The case of Maya's disappearance is later handled over to the police led by DCP Radhika with Arjun as the main suspect.

Arjun, now embroiled in a police case, which further gets complicated since he is an American national decides to tell the media about the interesting story regarding Maya's disappearance. Reporter Tanvi Singh tells him about journalist Ram Murthy aka 'Nutcase' Murthy' and Arjun seeks refuge in Murthy's house. Murthy was known for reopening old cases and was well aware of the Roswell incident and other similar disappearance cases similar to Maya's.

Radhika offers Arjun a trip back to America, but he denies the offer since he wants to find Maya and is confident that he saw her disappear via a UFO.

While at first it was thought that Maya was abducted by a UFO, it is later indirectly revealed that she is safe and likely that Dr. Sathya Prakash abducted her along with his team as he didn't want her to have access to top-secret information.

Arjun is later abducted by a UFO, which is also likely to be by Prakash. At the end of the film, his real name is revealed to be Nikhil "Nik" Prasad and that he went to India from America as part of a covert operation. The full name of Mandala: The UFO Incident (relating to Maya's disappearance) is revealed to be Bherunda Mandala.

== Cast ==
- Anant Nag as Ram Murthy
- Prakash Belawadi as Dr. Sathya Prakash
- Kiran Srinivas as Arjun Aralikatte
- Sharmiela Mandre as Maya Melukote
- Samyukta Hornad as DCP Radhika
- Mandeep Roy as Head Constable Raju (Note: His full name was revealed to be Rajanna.)
- Sudha Belawadi as Yashodha, Murthy's wife
- Dimpy Fadhya as Tanvi Singh
- Naresh Narasimhan as Commissioner Narasimha Rao (Note: Although the character was unnamed in the end credits, the name was revealed in the film.)
- Neenasam Ashwath as Inspector Ashok Galagali (Note: Despite his character's first name being revealed, he is listed in the credits by its last name.)
- Spoorthi Gumaste as Reporter Anjali
- Kiran Naik as Constable Hanumanthu (Note: Nicknamed "Kum-Ka" (based on Kumbhakarna) by Raju due to his frequent naps.)
- Samanvita Shetty as Namitha
- Gundanna as 'Rocket' Thatha

== Production ==
The film, initially titled Mysore Masala, was later renamed to Mandala. Anant Nag, the veteran actor of India known for his contributions to the Kannada film industry, was signed on to play a crucial role of an eccentric journalist. Prakash Belawadi plays the role of Dr. Satyaprakash, the head of a space research agency. Sharmiela Mandre, Samyukta Hornad and Kiran Srinivas play roles that are urban and savvy. Production management was handled by Cinematrix, a Bangalore based company headed by Pradeep Belawadi.

=== Post-production ===
Post-production efforts were spread across multiple cities. Mumbai for sound design by Nithin Lukose, Los Angeles for music by Jesse Clinton, Singapore for visual effects by Oliver Elvis, supported by CG artefact design by Manojna Bellur and editing by 24Post studio.

The film had a presence at the ComicCon 2018 event at Bengaluru. At the event, the team mentioned having designed and built their own VFX elements such as a spaceship, rocket launch metrics, alien scripts, etc. for the film.

The title of the film was changed to Mandala. This change was announced on all of the film's social media channels on Jan 9th 2022. The Director/Producer mentioned that the change reflected what the film had become.

== Soundtrack ==
The soundtrack consists of a song composed by Raghu Dixit and a score by Jesse Clinton.

Track listing
No.	Title	Lyrics	Singer(s)	Length
1.	"Neenillade"	Vasuki Vaibhav	Raghu Dixit	5:44
Total length:				5:44

== Reception ==
Harish Basavarajah of The Times of India rated the film 3/5 stars and concluded, "Although the climax of the movie is a bit confusing, it is a thriller and is worth watching". Prathibha Joy of OTTplay rated the film 3.5/5 and wrote, "Give Mandala… a watch this week, just don’t go in expecting Hollywood level production quality and visuals. Ajay has tried his best and his best is not bad". Shashiprasad S M of The South First gave the film the same rating and wrote, "Mandala: The UFO Incident is tailor-made for those who love sci-fi movies and that they love anything to do with extra-terrestrials — UFOs and aliens".
