= Dhaam Dhoom =

2008 Indian film by Jeeva

- Directed by: Jeeva; G. K. Manikandan; Anees Tanveer (unc.); P. C. Sreeram (unc.)
- Written by: S. Ramakrishnan (dialogue)
- Screenplay by: Jeeva; S. Ramakrishnan
- Story by: Robert King; Jeeva
- Based on: Red Corner by Jon Avnet; Robert King
- Produced by: Dr. Murali Manohar; Sunanda Murali Manohar; Jayakumar
- Starring: Ravi Mohan; Jayaram; Kangana Ranaut; Lakshmi Rai
- Cinematography: Jeeva; B. Rajasekar; P. C. Sreeram (unc.)
- Edited by: V. T. Vijayan
- Music by: Harris Jayaraj
- Production companies: Mediaone Global Entertainment; Metro Films Pvt.Ltd
- Distributed by: Ayngaran International
- Release date: 29 August 2008
- Running time: 142 minutes
- Country: India
- Language: Tamil

Dhaam Dhoom is a 2008 Indian Tamil-language action thriller film based on the 1997 American film Red Corner. Written, filmed and directed by Jeeva shortly before his death and produced by Sunanda Murali Manohar, it stars Ravi Mohan (credited as Jayam Ravi), Jayaram, Kangana Ranaut and Lakshmi Rai. The film revolves around an Indian doctor who goes to Russia for a conference and gets convicted for a murder he did not commit. How he manages to exonerate himself with the help of an Indian lawyer forms the crux of the story.

Dhaam Dhoom was released worldwide on 29 August 2008. It was the posthumous film that Jeeva undertook before his death which occurred halfway through the production. The film, released as a tribute to Jeeva, was completed by his assistant G. K. Manikandan, and his wife Anees, and was overseen by cinematographer P. C. Sriram.

== Plot ==
Gautham Subramaniam is a doctor from an Indian family who lives in Chennai. Since his father and mother are doctors, he wanted to become a doctor. Gautham gets an opportunity from the Government of India to go to Russia to represent India in a week long medical conference, along with five other young doctors. Gautham is delighted to receive this offer and packs his bags to fly to Russia. Meanwhile, his beloved is introduced on the frame, which happens to be Shenba (Kangana Ranaut). She happens to be from the same village in which Gautham's sister Sarasu resides with her husband (Chetan). So, the two meet and fall in love but keep it a secret. However, Sarasu's husband finds their love when he sees Gautham pinching Shenba's waist so hard that she screams. Despite initial frictions between her father (Mahadevan) and uncle (Bose Venkat) with Gautham, they eventually agree to get the pair married. Gautham's parents agree to the marriage, and as a happy man, Gautham is ready to marry Shenba after his return to India from his Russia trip.

Finally, the journey to Russia happens. Gautham reaches Moscow and completes his immigration procedures. Incidentally, Gautham meets Anna (Maria Kozhevnikova), and unknowingly, Anna drops her jacket, which is seen by Gautham. He has no time to return the jacket and exits from the Moscow airport accompanied by his medical team. Gautham is flabbergasted by the roads and buildings of the city and is surprised to see the city of Moscow from his hotel view. Gautham learns that the only hiccup with Russians is that the people are ignorant about the English language and the whole conversation with them must be made in Russian.

Soon after, Gautham discovers Anna and takes the prospect to return her coat. get together well and part ways. Meanwhile, Gautham's medical conference takes place successfully, and in order to celebrate its success, the whole team heads to a nightclub. Gautham bumps into Anna in the nightclub, and the two have an enjoyable time in the club. Anna, due to heavy consumption of liquor, intoxicates, and Gautham has no other choice but to accompany her to her room. When the two reach Anna's apartment, they settle down and sleep. Gautham is brutally dragged onto the floor by a Russian police officer the next morning, and the reason is that Anna is murdered on her sofa.

Consequently, Gautham's situation changes; he gets abused, accused, and imprisoned by the Russian police. The language, people, and surroundings are totally new and confusing to him. Fortunately, Aarthi Chinnappa (Lakshmi Rai) is appointed as a defendant lawyer to Gautham. The Indian consulate sends Raghavan Nambiar (Jayaram) to Gautham's rescue. When Gautham tries to run away from the Russian police, he gets drowned in a lake, and Aarthi finds him at the shore. Aarthi kisses Gautham to rescue him, and she realises that she has fallen in love with Gautham, but she suppresses her feelings when she learns about Shenba. Gautham escapes from the police and is running around St. Petersburg with Aarthi, trying to figure out who murdered Anna and why he was caught up in the scandal. Whilst fleeing from the police, Gautham gets shot by the mob and manages to escape narrowly. After taking care of his wounds, Aarthi and Gautham decide to seek down those who misled them. The eventual villainous figure is revealed to be Raghavan.

Before a shoot out, Raghavan reveals that Anna was a drug trafficker from Chennai to Russia, and by dropping her coat, consisting of drugs, off at the airport, she manages to evade being caught. Soon after, Anna had changed her ways and was ready to tell the police about Raghavan's drug dealing, but before that happened, Raghavan, along with the mob, had her killed off. In the final scene, Raghavan is killed by the police, and Gautham is set free to reunite with Shenba for their wedding.

== Cast ==
- Ravi Mohan as Dr. Gautham Subramaniam
- Jayaram as Raghavan Nambiar
- Kangana Ranaut as Shenba (Voice dubbed by Chinmayi)
- Lakshmi Rai as Adv. Aarthi Chinappa
- Maria Kozhevnikova as Anna
- Nizhagal Ravi as Dr. Subramaniam, Gautham's father
- Pithamagan Mahadevan as Shenba's father
- Bose Venkat as Shenba's uncle
- Chetan as Sarasu's husband
- Srinath as Chinnavar (Chinnathu)
- Anu Hasan as Sarasu, Gautham's sister
- Janaki Sabesh as Gautham's mother
- Vatsala as Gautham's grandmother
- Theni Kunjarammal as a villager
- Kadhal Arun Kumar as a villager
- Sai Pallavi as Shenba's relative (uncredited role)

== Production ==
Initially Reema Sen was cast as the lead actress but opted out due to creative differences with director Jeeva; Hindi actress Kangana Ranaut replaced her, making her debut in Tamil as Jeeva was impressed with her performance in the 2006 films Woh Lamhe... and Gangster: A Love Story. The first schedule was shot in February 2007, in and around Pollachi. The crew later shot in Russia. During filming in Saint Petersburgh, on 26 June 2007, Jeeva died after suffering a cardiac arrest. In early July 2007, it was announced that P. C. Sreeram would complete the project with Jeeva's widow Anees. Finally, Anees announced that the film would be completed by her and Jeeva's assistant G. K. Manikandan, whilst Sreeram would supervise their efforts.

== Soundtrack ==
The film has six songs composed by Harris Jayaraj with the lyrics primarily penned by Na. Muthukumar and Pa. Vijay.

Track-List
| No. | Title | Lyrics | Singer(s) | Length |
|---|---|---|---|---|
| 1. | "Thikku Thikku" | Pa. Vijay | Benny Dayal, Sayanora Philip | 5:25 |
| 2. | "Yaaro Manathile" | Pa. Vijay | Bombay Jayashree, Krish | 5:09 |
| 3. | "Anbe En Anbe" | Na. Muthukumar | Harish Raghavendra | 4:49 |
| 4. | "Pudhu Pudhu" | Pa. Vijay | Benny Dayal, Suchitra, Mizta G (Guna) | 4:22 |
| 5. | "Uyyaalalo Uyyaalalo" | Pa. Vijay | Kailash Kher, Sujatha | 4:42 |
| 6. | "Azhiyilae" | Na. Muthukumar | Haricharan | 2:39 |
| Total length: | | | | 27:06 |

Telugu track list
| No. | Title | Lyrics | Singer(s) | Length |
|---|---|---|---|---|
| 1. | "Sala Sala Kaaguthundi" | Vennelakanti | Benny Dayal, Sayanora Philip, Rakhi, Praveen | 5:21 |
| 2. | "Yedo Chelimila" | Rakhi | Rakhi, Iswaraya Bharani | 5:01 |
| 3. | "Choopey Nee Choopeye" | Vennelakanti | Harish Raghavendra | 5:01 |
| 4. | "Chiru Chiru Aasalu" | Harish Naaga | Mani, Praveen, Power Vijay | 4:21 |
| 5. | "Nee Menu Mandara" | Rakhi | Rakhi | 2:20 |
| Total length: | | | | 22:04 |

== Release ==
=== Reception ===
Pavithra Srinivasan of Rediff.com rated the film 3/5 stars and wrote, "With logic, good performances and sound music, Dhaam Dhoom is definitely worth a watch". Sify wrote, "The biggest weakness of the film is its screenplay On the whole film lacks a tempo and the second half is far too drawn out".

=== Box office ===
The film opened in Chennai strongly, with advance bookings full for the opening weekend at Inox and Sathyam Cinemas, while at Mayajaal, there were 22 shows daily of the film, leading to a successful opening of 92% full attendance.

Overseas, in the United Kingdom box office, the film opened at number 22, earning £21,634 during the first weekend, after opening across four Cineworld screens. After the second week the cumulative gross increased to £37,050, retaining the number of screens, but slipping to 34th in the weekly rankings.
