= Aake (film) =

2017 film directed by K. M. Chaitanya

- Official poster
- Directed by: K. M. Chaitanya
- Written by: Sunanda Murali Manohar; Carl Austin; Rohit Padaki (dialogues)
- Story by: Ashwin Saravanan
- Based on: Maya by Ashwin Saravanan
- Produced by: Sunanda Murali Manohar; Kalai; Surya
- Starring: Chiranjeevi Sarja; Sharmiela Mandre
- Edited by: Haridoss KGF
- Music by: Gurukiran
- Production company: Nakshatra Production
- Distributed by: Eros International; Mysore Talkies
- Release date: 30 June 2017
- Running time: 132 minutes
- Country: India
- Language: Kannada

Aake is a 2017 Indian Kannada language neo noir horror film directed by K. M. Chaitanya. It features Chiranjeevi Sarja and Sharmiela Mandre in the lead. Achyuth Kumar and Prakash Belawadi play the supporting roles. The screenplay was written by Sunanda and Carl Austin. The movie is an official remake of the 2015 Tamil movie Maya.

== Plot ==
The film runs on two seemingly separate plots simultaneously. In one, a single mother in Bengaluru is trying to make a living out of her floundering acting career. In the second, an artist is in London assigned to draw illustrations for a book about a ghost that haunts a locked out mental asylum.

It is only towards the end that the two plots merge and the audience gets to understand the suspense and the missing blocks.

== Cast ==
- Chiranjeevi Sarja as Arjun/Shiva
- Sharmiela Mandre as Sharmila
- Achyuth Kumar as Madan
- Prakash Belawadi as PK
- Sneha Acharya as Swathi
- Balaji Manohar

== Production ==
The project marks the Hindi production and distribution company Eros International's entry into Kannada cinema. The film is produced by Nakshatra Productions, United Kingdom for KS films.The original score and soundtrack for the film was composed by Gurukiran in London. The cinematography was done by UK based Ian Howes.

The film is a British production, made with technicians from United Kingdom and Karnataka.

It is the second collaboration of executive producer Yogish Dwarakish, director Chaitanya, and hero Chiranjeevi trio after Aatagara. The movie marked the entry of Eros International in Kannada film industry. This was also the last Kannada movie to be released before the implementation of GST.

== Soundtrack ==
Aake

Soundtrack album by Gurukiran
- Released: 2017
- Genre: Feature film soundtrack
- Language: Kannada
- Producer: Gurukiran

Gurukiran chronology
Chowka (2016)	Aake (2017)

The music was composed by Gurukiran.

Track listing
No.	Title	Singer(s)	Length
1.	"Aake"	Chandan Shetty	5:00

== Reception ==
The movie received positive reviews. A critic from The Times of India gave the movie 3.5 stars and praised its script saying "The biggest victory for Aake is the script, which lingers on in one's mind, in which you try to join the dots even much after the film's ended. A critic from Deccan Chronicle gave the movie 3 stars. Praising its technical brilliance, it said "Aake has an imaginary and suspense elements to builds the tension till her real face is revealed. It is the making and the technical work capturing the London's nearby creepy forest area in the dark which makes it an interesting watch". A critic from The News Minute wrote, "What works for Aake is that the fundamentals are all done right. So, the camera stays close-in and tightly focused, keeping an almost claustrophobic view on the film’s protagonists and antagonists. This helps ratchet the tension higher, as you’re constantly wondering what's lingering just outside the frame.The film’s soundscape is also sharply focused for the most part, staying away from the kind of cacophonous excess that turns many horror films into unintentional comedies.".
