= M. D. Pallavi =

Singer and actor from Karnataka, India

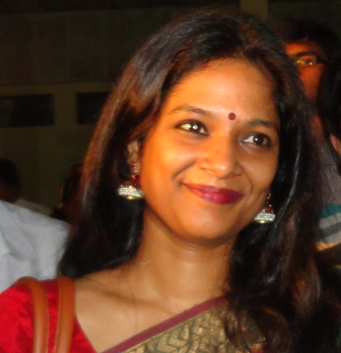

Background information
- Born: December 31, 1982 (age 43)
- Genre: Sugama Sangeetha
- Occupation: Singer
- Years active: 2000–present

M. D. Pallavi, also known by her married name Pallavi Arun, is a singer from Karnataka, India. She is a Kannada Sugama Sangeetha Singer, (Playback singer), and Television actor. She is married to Arun, a Percussionist (drums). She is a recipient of the 2018 Ustad Bismillah Khan Yuwa Puraskar awarded by Sangeet Nataka Akademi. She won the Karnataka State Film Awards for Best Playback Singer in 2006 and 2007 for her song "Nodayya Kvaate Lingave" sung in the 2007 film Duniya.

== Personal life ==
Pallavi comes from a family of artists. Her great grandfather, A.N. Subbarao, was a painter and started the Kalamandir School of Fine Arts in Bangalore, first fine arts school in India. her grandfather was A S Murthy he was known as Radio Eranna

== Music ==
M. D. Pallavi started training in Hindustani classical music, and has a degree in Hindustani Music from University of Benares. She received her training in Sugama Sengeetha from Mysore Ananthaswamy. Pallavi has received Hindustani Vocal training in Bangalore under Ram Rao Naik and Rajbhau Sontakke, a doyen of the Gwalior Gharana.

== Acting ==
=== Television and film ===
Pallavi made her debut in television with the television show Mayamruga. She has also acted in the popular Kannada television show Garva. She won the Aryabhatta "Best Actress" award. She was also a member of cast in the Indian English language film Stumble, released in 2003. This film won the National Award in the Best English Film category for the year 2002. She also acted with Umashree in National Award winning Kannada movie Gulabi Talkies.

== Playback songs ==
This is a partial list of notable films where M. D. Pallavi has sung

- All films are in Kannada, unless otherwise noted

Year	Film
2000	Shrirasthu Shubhamasthu
2003	Singaravva
2007	Duniya
2009	Venkata in Sankata
2009	Eddelu Manjunatha
2009	Junglee
2010	Crazy Kutumba
2010	Holi
2010	Nooru Janmaku
2010	Banni
2010	Dildar
2010	Ijjodu
