= Venkata in Sankata =

Venkata In Sankata
- VCD cover
- Directed by: Ramesh Arvind
- Written by: Madhu Thotapalli
- Produced by: Naren A Manglani; Ashok V Mittal; Prakash N Amarnani
- Starring: Ramesh Aravind; Sharmiela Mandre; Anusha; Devadas Kapikad
- Cinematography: PKH Das; G. S. Bhaskar
- Edited by: P. R. Soundar Rajan
- Music by: Ricky Kej
- Production company: Sinema House
- Release date: 20 February 2009
- Running time: 139 minutes
- Country: India
- Language: Kannada

Venkata In Sankata is a 2009 Indian Kannada-language comedy film directed by Ramesh Aravind. The story is written by Telugu film writer, Madhu Thotapalli. This is the fourth directorial venture of actor Ramesh Aravind.

Besides Ramesh playing the title role of a traffic cop, the film cast includes Sharmiela Mandre, Anusha, Meghana Mudiyan, and Tulu theatre artist Devadas Kapikad amongst others. The film made its theatrical release on 20 February 2009 and received favorable reviews from the critics.

== Plot ==
The film is about a traffic constable Venkata (Ramesh) who dreams big of becoming a commissioner. Situations provoke him to become a target for all the troubles that happen around him. Later he is sent as an undercover cop to a college. His duty is to bust the terrorists who are stealing chemicals from that college to prepare bombs. How he comes out of the trouble and reaches his aim forms the rest of the plot told in a hilarious manner.

== Cast ==
- Ramesh Aravind as Venkata
- Devadas Kapikad as Rajaram Laddoo
- Sharmiela Mandre
- Meghana Mudiyam as Meghana
- Anusha as asha
- M. S. Umesh as "Gundamma"
- Mukhyamantri Chandru
- H. G. Dattatreya
- Rajendra Karanth as Iqbal
- Umashree
- Bank Janardhan
- Karibasavaiah
- Kashi
- Dingri Nagaraj
- Rajinikanth S. as Punga
- Yogish
- Ajay
- Arjun

== Soundtrack ==
Venkata In Sankata

Soundtrack album by Ricky Kej
- Released: January 2009
- Genre: Feature film soundtrack
- Label: Anand Audio

Ricky Kej chronology
Accident (2008)	Venkata In Sankata (2009)	Crazy Kutumba (2010)

The music was composed by Ricky Kej for Anand Audio company. The audio was launched and released to the market on 20 January 2009.

Track listing
No.	Title	Lyrics	Singer(s)	Length
1.	"Venkata"	Avinash Chebbi	Avinash Chebbi
2.	"Yedeya Olage"	Kaviraj	M. D. Pallavi Arun
3.	"Koogi Kuniyona"	Kaviraj	Avinash Chebbi, Chaitra H. G.
4.	"Nodutha"	Jayanth Kaikini	Naresh Iyer, Chaitra H. G.
5.	"Venkata (English)"	Avinash Chebbi, Devan	Avinash Chebbi

== Reception ==
Upon release, the film met with positive critical reviews for its comical content and character portrayals. The Times of India reviewed with four out of five stars lauding the film to be a "brilliant family entertainer with an excellent script, neat narration and slick placement of sequences". Rediff.com reviewed that the film is "worth a watch" giving it a 3 1/2 out of 5 star rating. Bangalore Mirror wrote "Then there are the made-to-make you-laugh characters like the gluttonous old woman played by Umesh, a fake godman, a group of naughty students and fumbling lecturers who in perfect sync with the story. The highlights of the film are the quirky dialogues and the swift narrative".
