= Powder (2024 film) =

- Theatrical release poster
- Directed by: Janardhan Chikkanna
- Written by: Deepak Venkateshan
- Produced by: Karthik Gowda; Yogi G. Raj; Vijay Subramaniam; Arunabh Kumar
- Starring: Diganth Manchale; Dhanya Ramkumar; Sharmiela Mandre; Anirudh Acharya; Rangayana Raghu; Ravishankar Gowda; Gopalkrishna Deshpande
- Cinematography: Shanthi Sagar H. G. Advaitha Gurumurthy
- Edited by: N. Hari Krishna
- Music by: Vasuki Vaibhav
- Production companies: KRG Studios; The Viral Fever (TVF)
- Release date: 23 August 2024
- Country: India
- Language: Kannada

Powder is a 2024 Indian Kannada-language youthful dark comedy film, directed by Janardhan Chikkanna and produced by KRG Studios in collaboration with TVF Motion Pictures. The story and screenplay is written by Deepak Venkateshan. The film features Diganth Manchale, Dhanya Ramkumar, Sharmiela Mandre, Anirudh Acharya, Rangayana Raghu, Ravishankar Gowda, Gopalkrishna Deshpande and others.

The film was initially schedule to release on 12 July 2024, but it didn't! but the film was released theatrically on 23 August 2024.

== Plot ==
Powder is a story about get-rich-quick plans, the goons who are in desperate search for their missing consignment and the mastermind who wants to stamp their authority and restore order, all resulting in a comedy of errors.

== Cast ==
- Diganth Manchale as Surya
- Dhanya Ramkumar as Nithya
- Sharmiela Mandre as Mallika
- Anirudh Acharya as Karan
- Rangayana Raghu as Annachi
- Ravishankar Gowda as Pavan
- Gopalkrishna Deshpande as Suleiman
- Nagabhushana as Dr. WHO
- Finley Whisby as Michael Octave
- Chu Khoy Sheng

== Production ==
The muhurtha of the film took place in Bangalore on 6 September 2023. The shooting commenced in Mysuru on 30 October 2023 and wrapped up the first schedule within 30 days. The second and final schedule of the film was wrapped up at Bangalore on 14 March 2024.

== Music ==
The first single "Mission Gama Gama" was released on 5 July 2024. Vasuki Vaibhav has composed and sung the song, collaborating with MC Bijju who has rapped and penned the rap portion. The second song was released on 26 July 2024.

== Release ==
The film was originally scheduled for release on 5 April 2024. However, due to production delays the theatrical release has been postponsed to 15 August 2024. Later, the production company announced that the release date is postponed to 23 August 2024.

== Reception ==
Shashiprasad SM of the Times Now rated the film three out of five stars and wrote, "Powder has enough to spread the fragrance of madness mixed with pure fun and entertainment. However, It only works for those who occasionally enjoy a bit of silliness and mindless comedy with logic taking a back seat." Jagadish Angadi of Deccan Herald gave it three out of five stars and wrote, "Although the film defies logic and reasoning, it is certainly a delightful weekend family entertainer."

Vivek M.V. of The Hindu wrote that "Powder starring Diganth in the lead and directed by Janardhan Chikkanna, is helped by its eccentric characters even if the story isn’t remarkable". Y. Maheswara Reddy of Bangalore Mirror wrote that "The movie would have been better had the director reduced the runtime by 10 or 15 minutes."
