= Last Bus (2016 film) =

- Directed by: S D Arvind
- Produced by: G. N. C. Reddy; B. Krishnappa; S. D. Arvind; Prashanth Kallur; Gururaj Kulkarni (Nadagouda)
- Starring: Avinash Narasimharaju; Meghashree Bhagavatar; Samarth Narasimharaju; Prakash Belawadi
- Cinematography: Ananth Arasu
- Edited by: Sri Crazymindz
- Music by: S D Arvind
- Production companies: Goals and Dreams / G9 Communications, media and entertainment
- Release date: 15 January 2016
- Country: India
- Language: Kannada

Last Bus (ಲಾಸ್ಟ್ ಬಸ್ pronounced lāst bas) is a 2016 Indian Kannada-language psychological thriller film written, co-produced and directed by S D Arvind who is also the music composer. It stars Avinash Narasimharaju, Meghashree Bhagavatar, Manasa Joshi and Samarth Narasimharaju in the lead roles. The movie is dubbed in to Telugu as ‘Adivilo Last Bus’ in the same year.

The song "Doori Doori" featured in the BBC Asian Network radio centre which was facilitated by Narayan Konda. After receiving rave reviews, the film is set to be dubbed in French language and released across France. This is the first Kannada film to be dubbed in French. Last Bus Successfully completed 100 Days in Kailash Main theatre & other few theatres on 22.04.2016. The film was dubbed in Telugu as Adavilo Last Bus.

The film met with critical praise upon release and won Karnataka State Film Award for Best Art Direction for Avinash Narasimharaju and Karnataka State Film Award for Best Cinematographer for Ananth Arasu. The film was dubbed in Hindi by same name.

== Plot ==
Prithvi is walking down a very scenic road after giving up on trekking. He wants to get back to his home in Bangalore via another village called Theerthalli, while his friends continue their trekking. A local person says buses are rare. Trains and airports are not present in nearby villages. Prithvi waits there until a local bus picks him up. This is the last bus from that place for the day. The bus is going to a place called Hansa instead of Bangalore or Theerthalli. The conductor tells Prithvi that he can change buses at Hansa and then reach Bangalore. There are a few passengers present in the bus. The Next passenger to be picked up is a sobbing lady called Mamtha. Her father drops her at the bus stop. She is trying to get to a court where a case is going on for custody of her daughter from her separated husband. Another lady Rita is running away from home to meet her boyfriend Santhosh and live / elope with him against the wishes of her family to Mumbai. She is the next passenger to get in the bus. The bus continues the journey. The next person to be picked up is a local lady called Seetha. Sometimes referred to as Seethaka The bus driver named Tanka likes Seetha, but Seetha hints that she does not share the same feeling. Next person to be picked up is a student called Sudhakara. He is trying to get to Chikkmangalore to attend an exam the next day. The Journey onward to Hansa is through a dense and remote forest. The driver stops at a place to pray to a local deity for a safe journey onward and offers a bottle of Alcohol. This is a regular practice. A clean shaven skin head Hindu priest named Sahasra Sagara meets the driver and reprimands him for being late. The priest is the next passenger to get in the bus. he prays in Malayalam in the move.

As the bus progress further, three local hunters hop on to the bus. Prithvi starts chatting with them. The three hunters reveal that the forest is dense and terrifying. They mention that it is difficult and dangerous to travel in this forest in broad daylight and being in the forest during night is totally out of question. This is because they have experienced strange events in the forest and as a practice they do not talk about it. Prithvi is puzzled and cannot understand how a scenic forest can be terrifying. All the passengers enjoy the journey and the pleasant nature

A huge tree is shown falling and blocking the road for the bus. The driver, conductor, hunters and some passengers see this as a bad omen and says they should return home and not continue the journey. Prithvi feels it is just a regular event and brushes off the advice to turn back as superstitious beliefs. He wants to continue the journey. Rita, Sudhakara, Seetha and Mamtha wants to reach their destination and so want to continue their journey. The group splits into two section, one section with the conductor named Seena abandons the bus and starts walking back to their home. Another section led by Prithvi decides to continue the journey through an alternate route. Tanka the bus driver and the priest Sahasra are against taking alternate road. This is because the alternate road is not in good condition, it goes through dense forest that is considered haunted and life-threatening. The driver Tanka eventually agree after Seetha requests him to help a crying Mamtha reach the court in time to get custody of her daughter. The Gpriest man Sahasra reluctantly agrees to go with the bus. The bus with these passengers continues the journey through an alternate road. Suddenly the driver loses control and bangs on a tree and stops. Driver Tanka is nowhere to be seen, the passengers start searching for him. They start hearing his screams for help, Mamtha and Sudhakara are terrified and opts to stay back with the bus while Rita, Prithvi, Sahasra and Seetha go to save Tanka, they reach an old, dilapidated grand mansion and hears Tanka's scream from inside. Sahasra the priest warns the group not to enter the house as its evil and says they should turn back. Prithvi rebukes the priest and says they should help Tanka. Upon entering the house, they find Tanka tied up to a pillar with dry creepers and roots in an unconscious state. The group frees him. Tanka regains consciousness and tells them that he has no clue how he got here and that he never cried for help.

Back at the bus, Mamtha and Sudhakara start to worry about other people, the bus starts shaking and a well-dressed white bearded man comes out of the bus. The bearded man stares at Mamtha and Sudhakara and displays his dagger. Mamtha and Sudhakara are terrified and runs away from there. Mamtha and Sudhakara reach the Mansion where others are there and narrate the story. All of them explore the house and go through strange feelings in the house. Each of them sees the happy side of their desires. The priest Sahasra discovers six to ten graves with date of death engraved in it. The date is exactly 100 years earlier than the present date in the movie. Bus Driver Tanka gets stuck in quick sand and is screaming for help. The passengers are now trapped in the house and are unable to find their way out of the house. All doors are jammed shut. Tanka drowns in quick sand in front of their eyes. rest of them sees this from the window of the house they are trapped in

A women dressed in black dress walks on small dam declaring that its full moon and it has been 100 years since she tasted blood and today is the day that she will see six souls in pain. A TV channel crew is shown as shooting this scene of the women. The women is the Heroine named Mallika. The TV crew has set up a tent near the old mansion and the water falls. The TV crew is led by Actor Prakash Belawadi called Sandy in the movie. Sandy is the director of the reality show. He plays an eccentric role and is chasing success at any cost. The TV crew has Geeta the Channel manager. Steve the camera Man, Mahesh as a technician and Shweta as a member. It is revealed that this TV crew had set up traps for the people in the bus with help from bus driver Tanka. The intention is to record the events in the house and broadcast it in a reality show. The passengers of the bus trapped in the mansion are unaware of this. Tanka comes back to the TV crew's team after finishing his role. All of them discuss who should be chosen as the winner of the show. The TV crew manager promises that all of them will be happy when they get a payment of 1 lakh in the morning for being trapped and filmed in the mansion. The well-dressed white bearded man comes to the tent of the TV crew and collects fee for his role, as soon as the manager Geeta pays him, another member of the TV crew brings the well-dressed white bearded man for payment. The TV crew manager is puzzled as how can the same person appear twice. Prakash goes to the vanity van of the heroine Mallika and tried / tries to exploit her, he is shown as beaten up, wounded and unconscious.

Meanwhile, the people trapped in the mansion experience super natural events and struggle to live through it. They try to light fire, but do not have a match stick, the priest Sahasra tries to ignite a pile of wood through magic but fails, but all of sudden the pile catches fire without human intervention. Prithvi breaks an old wooden cradle to use as firewood, but the broken wood pieces re-attach and attack them and Sudhakara is wounded. Seetha hallucinates about a woman named Maayi and gets pricked by thorns in her hands. Sudhakara jumps in a well but Prithvi saves him, they all get possessed by turns and sings the Doori Doori song in turns. The lyrics of the song tells the story of a woman who was wronged and killed there. There is a painting of 6 people in the house with their backs, but after some time each of the faces start appearing and they resemble the 6 people stuck in the house. There is another painting in the house of the well-dressed white bearded man. This painting was placed by the TV crew to spook the participants. Back at the recording station, Prakash scolds the technician Mahesh for not placing a camera or a trap near the graves discovered by priestSahasra and asks him to place one immediately. While the technician nears the grave an unseen force kills him from behind. The camera man Steve recording the events from the tent sees this on TV and gets scared and leaves the tent. The remaining crew want to stop the show and leave but the heroine Mallika appears as a possessed person and stops them. She then clicks on the mouse connected to the computer, the entire tent experiences a huge blast and is shown burning. The people stuck in the mansions are physically hurt by now, they are tired and have lived through the night without food or water. The night is over and the day starts to dawn. The main door opens and all of them leave the house slowly one after the other after being mentally tortured throughout the night. Prithvi mentions that she destroyed all the traditional believes as he leaves. Sandy regains consciousness and channel Manager Geeta also gets up from a river bank. Tanka also survives the blast and gets up.

At Past, Maayi also known as Mayamma is a laborer in a village. Her Marriage happens in childhood. She is married to the young master of the house and becomes the governing lady. She gives birth to a young girl called Mallava. One day when the child goes out to play in the garden, a huge vulture flies away with the child. Her family is non supportive and makes her feel that they wanted only her child and not her. Her family torments her, tortures her before murdering her. Mayamma becomes angry and becomes a spirit. She kills all her family members on the same day.

== Cast ==
- Avinash Diwakar as Prithvi / Pruthvi
- Samarth Narasimharaju as student named Sudhakara
- Meghashree Bhagavatar as Seetha also known as Seethakka
- Manasa Joshi as Mamatha
- Deepa Gowda as Rita
- Prakash Belawadi as Sandy the reality show Director
- Rajesh P. I. as the God man Sahasra Sagara
- Raakaa Shankar Shetty as Bus Driver Tanka
- Lokeshachaar as Bus Conductor
- Sneha Nagaraj as Reality show heroine Mallika
- SrieeVihaa

== Soundtrack ==
Last Bus

Soundtrack album by S. D. Arvind
- Genre: Feature film soundtrack

S D Arvind has composed the film's background score and the soundtrack.

=== Track listing ===
| No. | Title | Lyrics | Singer(s) | Length |
|---|---|---|---|---|
| 1. | "Doori Doori" | Dr. K. Y. Narayanaswamy | Chintan Vikas, Sujatha Iyer |
| 2. | "Ready to Go" | Dr. K. Y. Narayanaswamy | Vikas Navale, S. P. Mahesha, Sujatha Iyer, Meghana Ommen |
| 3. | "Kandiddu Ulidilla" | Dr. K. Y. Narayanaswamy | Murali Ramanathan |
| 4. | "Doori (Theatrical)" | Dr. K. Y. Narayanaswamy | Chintan Vikas, Sujatha Iyer |
| 5. | "Doori (Lullaby)" | Dr. K. Y. Narayanaswamy | Latha Jahangirdar |
| 6. | "In Search of Mystic Land – Devaramane" | | Instrumental |
| 7. | "The Haunted House" | | Instrumental |
| 8. | "Last Bus Mashup" | | DJ Neal Nash |
| 9. | "The Road Less Travelled (Theme)" | | Instrumental |

== Reception ==
=== Critical response ===
Sunayana Suresh of The Times of India scored the film at 3.5 out of 5 stars and says "If over-the-top comedy or action and ready-to-eat masala films aren't your staple diet and you yearn for films that challenge you as a viewer, this one deserves a watch." Vijaya Karnataka scored the film at 3.5 out of 5 stars and says "KYN songs written with lines that have no face for darkness, no light for back, Graphic creations are enjoyable, except for falling trees. One of the most recent experimental films is the Last Bus."

== External sources ==
- Last Bus at IMDb
- Last Bus Film website
- Last Bus on Facebook
