= Stumble (film) =

- Directed by: Prakash Belawadi
- Screenplay by: Prakash Belawadi
- Story by: Prakash Belawadi
- Produced by: Krishna Chidambara; Nagaraj Rao; S. J. Krishna Kumar
- Starring: Anant Nag; Suhasini Maniratnam
- Cinematography: Clay Kelton
- Edited by: Jesu Dominic; Shyam Nanjundiah
- Music by: Praveen D. Rao
- Production company: 2Streams Media
- Release date: 21 February 2003
- Running time: 140 minutes
- Country: India
- Language: English

Stumble is a 2003 Indian English-language film written and directed by Prakash Belawadi in his debut. It stars Anant Nag and Suhasini Maniratnam in the lead roles. Mukhyamantri Chandru, Ashok Mandanna and Priya Ganapathy feature in supporting roles. Set in Bangalore, the film explores the impact of corruption in the information technology world, the stock market and mutual funds scams and dot-com bubble on ordinary people.

Praveen D. Rao scored music for the film while Clay Kelton served as the cinematographer. The film opened to mixed reviews from critics upon theatrical release. At the 50th National Film Awards, the film was awarded the National Film Award for Best Feature Film in English.

== Cast ==
- Anant Nag as Anand Rao
- Suhasini Maniratnam as Nandini
- Mukhyamantri Chandru as Diwakar
- Ashok Mandanna as Darshan Khosla
- Priya Ganapathy as Indu
- M. D. Pallavi as Madhu (credited as Pallavi Dattu)
- Sihi Kahi Chandru
- Clay Kelton
- Russel Byrne
- Ajit Bhide as Prashant Hegde
- Veena Appiah
- Ajith Hande as Uday
- Aporup Acharya
- Anil Abraham
- Balaji Manohar as Aditya
- Mohammed Amanulla as Vasu
- Bhargavi Narayan
- M. P. Venkata Rao
- Poornima Vyasulu as Khosla's mother
- K. S. L. Swamy
- S. Dattakumar
- Goa Dattu
- Allen Mendonca
- Suhas Yelluru

== Reception ==
Critics mostly gave mixed reviews to the film. Pradeep Sebastian of Deccan Herald opined that despite the film playing "like a cross between a television serial drama and a somber Kannada art film, it isn't pointlessly wacky or irritatingly smart-alecky like most Indian English films". However, he complained that the film picks up pace only towards the end and that "for most of its running time it lacks drama, it lacks tension. It fails to grip." He concluded praising the film for its "evocative cinematography, deft characterization and convincing ensemble acting." The reviewer for Hindustan Times, Manjulaa S. Negi opined that the film was a "forthright tale about naive individuals who still believe. They are the idealists whose dreams are shattered rather rudely and there is no recourse really, but to try and get back to their earlier lives with a bit more understanding and a lot more wiseness." She felt that despite the subject's shortcomings, "it holds", while adding that the direction and sound departments needed improvement. She concluded writing that the film's content was "powerful enough" for one-time watch at least.

Deepa Gumaste of Rediff.com commended the film for its "realistic depiction of educated urban youth and their aspirations" and the performances of the leading actors including Anant Nag, Suhasini Maniratnam, M. D. Pallavi and Balaji Manohar. However, she blamed the director for being "over simplistic and loses his way with some characters". She added that the storytelling required to be more "restrained". The reviewer for Viggy.com called it "a brilliant 'made in Bangalore' English film for Bangaloreans, by Bangaloreans and of Bangaloreans." They echoed Gumaste's view on the performances of the leading characters. The reviewer added, "Music by Praveen D. Rao is real good. Catchy dialogs of Prakash are very effective."

== Screening ==
- It was screened at Mumbai International Film Festival
