= Sharmiela Mandre =

Indian actress (born 1987)

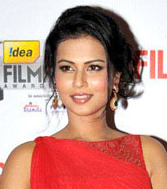
- Mandre in 2013
- Born: 28 October 1987 (age 38); Bangalore, Karnataka, India
- Other name: Sharmila Mandre
- Education: Sophia High School, Bangalore
- Occupation: Actress
- Years active: 2006–present
- Relatives: Sunanda Murali Manohar (aunt)

Sharmiela Mandre (born 28 October 1987) is an Indian actress and producer who primarily works in Kannada films. She made her acting debut with Sajni (2006) and then received success with Krishna, the same year. Mandre turned producer with the Tamil film Evanukku Engeyo Matcham Irukku (2018).

Post her debut, she received praises for the Kannada films Venkata in Sankata (2009) and Swayamvara (2010). She made her Tamil debut with Mirattal (2012) and Telugu debut with Kevvu Keka (2013). For the latter, she received SIIMA Award for Best Female Debut – Telugu nomination. Mandre's other notable work include Aake (2017), Gaalipata 2 (2022) and Powder (2024).

== Early life and background ==
Mandre was born on 28 October 1987 in Bangalore, Karnataka. Her father Dayananda Mandre is a businessman and a car-racing enthusiast. Her grandfather Ramananda Narayanrao Mandre was a film producer, distributor and the founder of Sangam Talkies, Bangalore. Mandre's paternal aunt Sunanda Murali Manohar, was a film producer. She completed her schooling from Sophia High School, Bangalore.

== Career ==
=== Debut and early success (2007-2011) ===
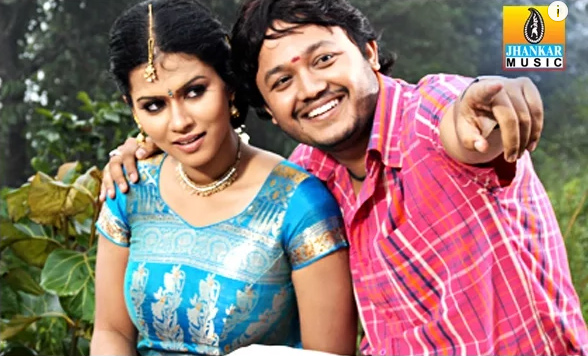
Sharmila Mandre (left), Ganesh (right) in 2007 Kannada film Krishna

Mandre made her film debut with Sajni in 2007, which was produced by her aunt Sunanda Murali Manohar. She portrayed a college student opposite Dhyan. Rediff.com noted, "Newcomer Sharmila rocks and has a bright future ahead for her." She had her first commercial success with the film Krishna opposite Ganesh. Rediff.com mentioned, "Sharmila, in her second film, proves that she is talented." Ee Bandhana was her final release of the year. In 2008, she appeared opposite Darshan in Navagraha and played a special role in Mast Maja Maadi.

She had two releases in 2009. She first appeared opposite Sriimurali in Shivamani. She then appeared in Venkata in Sankata alongside Devadas Kapikad and Ramesh Aravind. Rediff.com stated, "Sharmila Mandre manages to look pleasing on screen." In 2010, she first appeared opposite Diganth in Swayamvara. Deccan Herald said, "Sharmila is restrained and oozing glamour wherever required." She then appeared in Kari Chirathe opposite Duniya Vijay. In 2011, she appeared opposite Prem Kumar in Dhan Dhana Dhan.

=== Career expansion (2012-2017) ===
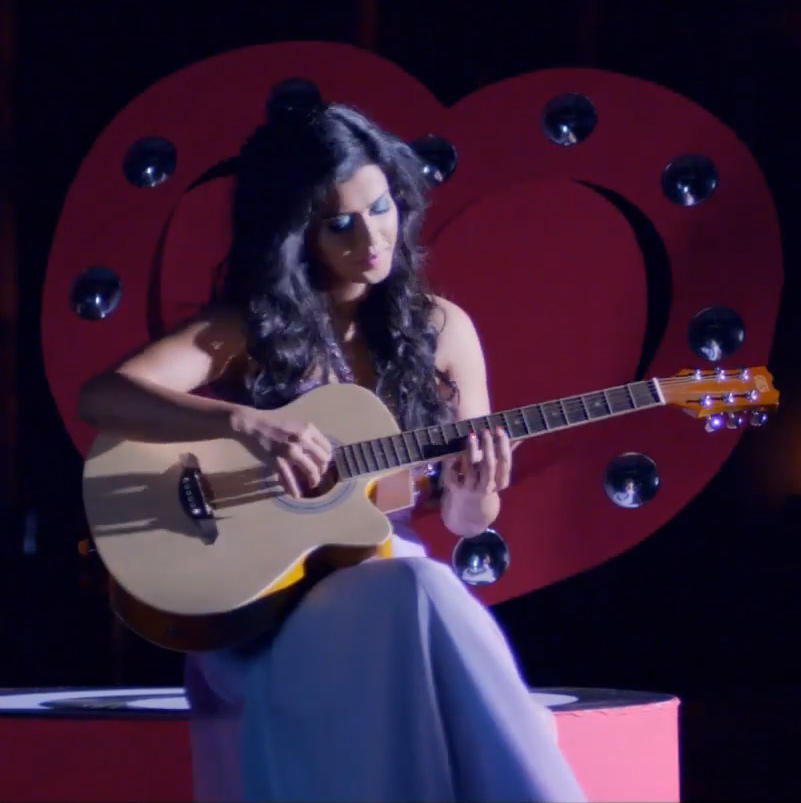
Sharmila Mandre in 2015 Kannada film Mumtaz

Mandre made her Tamil film debut with Mirattal, a remake of the Telugu film Dhee. She appeared opposite Vinay. In 2013, she made her Telugu film debut with Kevvu Keka opposite Allari Naresh. Times of India said, "Sharmeila Mandre's role makes for an enjoyable character." She received SIIMA Award for Best Female Debut – Telugu nomination for her performance.

Mandre appeared opposite Tarun Chandra in Goa. Times of India noted, "Sharmiela Mandre steals the show with a graceful performance." In December 2014, it was announced that she was selected to play the protagonist in the Khalid Mohammed's directorial Katha, a remake of 1983 film of the same name, reprising Deepti Naval's role. But the film got scrapped. In 2015, she portrayed the titular role in Mumtaz, opposite Dharma Keerthiraj. It was a commercial success. The New Indian Express wrote, "Sharmiela Mandre looks pretty but does not bring any depth."

Mandre had two releases in 2017. She appeared opposite Chiranjeevi Sarja in Aake, a remake of Tamil film Maya (2015), playing a single mother. Deccan Chronicle noted, "Sharmiela Mandre 'scares' with her top-notch acting and the rest revolves around her." While, The News Minute stated, "Sharmiela Mandre is shining on screen." In the same year, she also portrayed a journalist in Shivarajkumar's Leader. She learned belly dancing for her role in the film.

=== Hiatus and recent work (2018-present) ===
Mandre took a hiatus of 4 years, from acting due to her production work. She made her screen comeback with Gaalipata 2 in 2022. She portrayed a teacher opposite Pawan Kumar. The Hindu mentioned, "Sharmila Mandre justify her character." The film was a commercial success. In 2023, Mandre played an aerospace engineer in Mandala: The UFO Incident. The New Indian Express noted, "Sharmiela Mandre is convincing as the aerospace engineer, and she has accordingly worked on her looks and body language."

In 2024, Mandre played an assassin alongside Diganth in Powder. The Hindu found her to be striking with her action moves. Mandre next has her production Dasara with Sathish Ninasam in her kitty.

== Personal life ==
Mandre changed her name from Sharmila Mandre to Sharmiela Mandre in 2013, adding an extra "e" to her name. She termed it as a personal choice.

In 2020, Mandre suffered injuries after the car that she was travelling crashed against a pillar in Bengaluru.

== Other work and media image ==
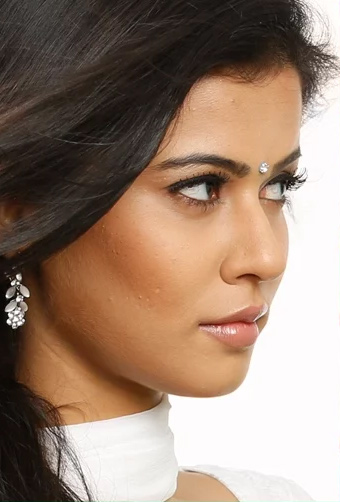
Mandre during a photoshoot

Mandre started her own production house named Sharmiela Mandre Productions, in 2018. She has produced Tamil films Evanukku Engeyo Matcham Irukku (2018) and Naanum Single Thaan under her production house. She will next produce the upcoming films, which include the Tamil films Sandakkari and Kaadhal Konjam Thookala, and the Kannada film Dasara, in which she stars too.

Mandre ranked 10th in 2012 and 8th in 2014 in Bangalore Times' 25 Most Desirable Women List. In its 30 Most Desirable Women List of 2020, she ranked 20th.

== Filmography ==
Key
†	Denotes films that have not been released yet

=== As actor ===
- All films are in Kannada, unless otherwise noted.

Year	Title	Role	Notes	Ref.
2007	Sajni	Sajni		
2007	Krishna	Anjali		
2007	Ee Bandhana	Shruthi		
2008	Navagraha	Kiran		
2008	Mast Maja Maadi	Herself	Special appearance	
2009	Shivamani	Shruthi		
2009	Venkata in Sankata	Reporter		
2010	Swayamvara	Anusha		
2010	Kari Chirathe	Shruthi		
2011	Dhan Dhana Dhan	Charmi		
2012	Mirattal	Deepika	Tamil film	
2013	Kevvu Keka	Mahalakshmi	Telugu film	
2014	Goa			
2015	Mumtaz	Anjali / Mumtaz		
2017	Aake	Sharmila Desai / Maya		
2017	Mass Leader	Sharmiela		
2022	Gaalipata 2	Sharmila		
2023	Mandala: The UFO Incident	Maya Melukote		
2024	Powder	Makeup Mallika		
2025	The Devil	Sushila		
TBA	Adhirshtasaali†	TBA	Tamil film; completed	
TBA	Dasara†	Anika	Post-production	

=== As producer ===
Year	Title	Language	Notes	Ref.
2018	Evanukku Engeyo Matcham Irukku	Tamil		
2021	Naanum Single Thaan	Tamil	co-producer	
2023	Sila Nodigalil	Tamil	creative producer	
2026	Sandakkari	Tamil	co-producer	
TBA	Dasara†	Kannada		
TBA	Kaadhal Konjam Thookala†	Tamil		

== Awards and nominations ==
Year	Award	Category	Film	Result	Ref.
2011	South Scope Style Awards	Most Stylish Actress - Kannada	Swayamvara	Won	
2014	South Indian International Movie Awards	Best Female Debut – Telugu	Kevvu Keka	Nominated	
2022	South Indian International Movie Awards	Best Actress – Kannada	Gaalipata 2	Nominated	
2023	Chandanavana Film Critics Academy Awards	Best Actress	Gaalipata 2	Won	

== See also ==
- List of Kannada film actresses
