= Kaadhal Kavithai =

- Poster
- Directed by: Agathiyan
- Produced by: Sunanda Murali Manohar
- Starring: Prashanth; Isha Koppikar; Kasthuri
- Cinematography: Ravi Yadav
- Edited by: Lancy-Mohan
- Music by: Ilaiyaraaja
- Production company: Metro Film Corporation
- Release date: 25 December 1998
- Running time: 145 minutes
- Country: India
- Language: Tamil

Kaadhal Kavithai (transl. Poem of love) is a 1998 Indian Tamil-language romance film directed by Agathiyan and produced by Sunanda Murali Manohar. The film stars Prashanth, Isha Koppikar (in her Tamil debut) and Kasthuri, while Manivannan and Srividya play supporting characters. The film had music composed by Ilaiyaraaja, while duo Lancy-Mohan and Ravi Yadav handled the editing and cinematography respectively.

The storyline revolves around a classical dancer who, while touring Europe, visits Princess Diana's memorial at Althorp. Browsing through the various messages left by the public, she comes across a poetic, poignant epistle in Tamil that captivates her and impels her to scribble a response. While returning a few days later, she finds the author of that note has left another one, prompting her to begin to search for the author. After opening on 25 December 1998, the film went on to gain success critically and became a commercially successful venture.

== Plot ==
Vishwa spends his time hanging out with Anandham to avoid his mother, who always quarrels with his father. To find peace, he plays tricks on others. Among the victims is Jothi. The story moves to London, where Vishva visits Princess Diana's grave and leaves a beautiful poem behind. At the same time, Jothi too visits the grave and leaves a note after reading the poem. Then begins a warm relationship between Jothi and Vishwa without seeing each other. Whether the two are united form the rest of the story.

== Cast ==
- Prashanth as Vishwa
- Isha Koppikar as Jothi
- Kasthuri as Swapna
- Manivannan as Vishwa's father
- Rajiv as Jothi's father
- Ambika as Vishwa's mother
- Srividya as Jothi's mother
- Charle as Anandham
- Supriya Nikita Palekar as Shoba
- Thalaivasal Vijay as Pandiyan
- Karan in a special appearance
- Raju Sundaram as himself in a special appearance
- Roja as herself in a special appearance
- Saranya Nag as Jothi's friend (child artiste)

== Production ==
After the success of the 1998 film Jeans, its co-producer Ashok Amritraj agreed to work with actor Prashanth again in his next film and thus signed on to finance a film to be directed by Agathiyan. The film, initially untitled, began filming in Tamil Nadu in August 1998. Amritraj later sold the project, later titled Kaadhal Kavithai, to Sunanda Murali Manohar of Cee I TV Limited.

Isha Koppikar made her debut as an actor in Tamil cinema with this film. The team had earlier approached Aishwarya Rai to be a part of the film, though she did not accept the offer. Monal auditioned for the film, but did not make the final cast. Prakash Raj was originally chosen for an important role; however he was replaced by Thalaivasal Vijay while Indraja was originally offered Kasthuri's role which she refused due to the role being glamorous. Roja made a cameo appearance for a song which was originally offered to Simran. Raju Sundaram choreographed a belly dance song shot in Rajasthan featuring Kasthuri. Part of the film was shot in London, with locations including near the River Thames, the Houses of Parliament, Piccadilly Circus and Althorp, where the memorial to Diana, Princess of Wales was located.

== Soundtrack ==
The soundtrack was composed by Ilaiyaraaja, and became one of the most sold Tamil albums in 1998.

Song	Singer(s)	Duration
"Aalana Naal Mudhala"	Pushpavanam Kuppusamy, Sowmya Raoh	05:06
"Hey Konji Pesu"	Ilaiyaraaja, Sujatha	05:05
"Alai Meethu"	Bhavatharini	03:04
"Diana Diana"	Hariharan	05:11
"Kadhal Meethu"	Hariharan	05:08
"Manasa Thotta Kadhal"	Hariharan	04:37
"Thathom"	Ila Arun, Swarnalatha	04:59

== Release and reception ==
D. S. Ramanujam from The Hindu gave the film a positive review, praising the director's work. Kala Krishnan Ramesh from Deccan Herald mentioned that the film is "visually a delight, the songs and music are pleasant, especially when they harmonise with the locations, which they don't always." The reviewer adds that "Prashanth is alright though he seems a little narcissistic, you always feel that he's looking at a mirror someone's holding up. The heroine is new, and not unpleasant. Srividya is wasted, though brightening."

G. Ulaganathan from The New Indian Express wrote that both Prashanth and Koppikar performed well and "Prashanth, especially after his Jeans has matured as an actor". R. P. R. of Kalki praised the acting of Manivannan and Ambika and poetic dialogues and felt the characterisation of parents of both main leads were more memorable than the lead pair but questioned Agathiyan for reusing the plot of his Kadhal Kottai instead of coming up with something new while panning the acting of Prashanth and Kasthuri's character design and concluded saying certain special features from the film may not attract the attention of fans because it is a familiar story but if you think the story doesn't matter, there are many other aspects of the film to consider.

Prashanth, with Kaadhal Kavithai, capped off a hat-trick of hit films in 1998 after the successes of Shankar's Jeans and Ravichandran's Kannedhirey Thondrinal. Koppikar won plaudits from critics for her performance with Rediff.com stating that with her "strong screen presence, and acting skills that belie her newbie status, she could be the latest to storm the TN industry". The film won her further offers and actor Vijay signed her on for his film Nenjinile after seeing her performance in Kaadhal Kavithai. She went on to win the Filmfare Award for Best Female Debut – South.
