= Hum Kisise Kum Nahin (2002 film) =

2002 Indian film by David Dhawan

- Theatrical release poster
- Directed by: David Dhawan
- Written by: Rumi Jaffery; Robin Bhatt
- Produced by: Afzal Khan
- Starring: Amitabh Bachchan; Sanjay Dutt; Ajay Devgn; Aishwarya Rai
- Cinematography: Manmohan Singh
- Edited by: David Dhawan
- Music by: Anu Malik
- Distributed by: T-Series; Shaboo Arts
- Release date: 31 May 2002
- Running time: 162 minutes
- Country: India
- Language: Hindi
- Budget: ₹180 million
- Box office: ₹291.5 million

Hum Kisise Kum Nahin (transl. We Are Not Less Than Anyone) is a 2002 Indian Hindi-language action comedy film directed by David Dhawan and produced by Afzal Khan. The film stars Amitabh Bachchan, Sanjay Dutt, Ajay Devgn, and Aishwarya Rai. The plot is inspired by the Harold Ramis-directed gangster comedy, Analyze This.

The film was released on 31 May 2002 and despite its star cast, the film performed averagely at the box office. The film was remade in Kannada as Dhan Dhana Dhan (2011).

== Plot ==
The film opens with Munna Bhai (Sanjay Dutt), a dreaded Mumbai goon, on the chase to Pillai (Ashish Vidyarthi). Munna Bhai catches him, and Pillai tries to escape into Komal's (Aishwarya Rai) dancing class. Komal stops Munna from beating him up and makes him say sorry to Pillai. Munna instantly falls in love with her, without realizing that he is in love. Noticing that Munna Bhai seems to be ill, his sidekick takes him to Dr. Rastogi (Amitabh Bachchan), whose diagnosis is that Munna Bhai is suffering from the "love virus" which can only be cured with love. He advises Munna Bhai to try to woo the girl he is smitten by. What no one yet knows is that the girl in question is Rastogi's younger sister. Rastogi takes Komal abroad to get her married, unaware that she is in love with Raja (Ajay Devgn), the bowling instructor. Raja, in disguise, fools Rastogi and follows them abroad. Munna Bhai is then on gun-point by Pillai, and Raja saves him. Unaware of knowing they both love the same girl, Rastogi makes a torn between them, which ends up getting Raja beat up. Munna Bhai gets his gun out, but before Rastogi realizes what he has done, Komal jumps in to save Raja and is shot. Munna Bhai realizing his mistake, surrenders, and gives up the crime world, while Dr. Rastogi also realizes his mistake and lets Komal marry Raja.

== Cast ==
- Amitabh Bachchan as Dr. Avinash Rastogi
- Sanjay Dutt as Munna Bhai
- Ajay Devgan as Raja
- Aishwarya Rai as Komal Rastogi, Dr. Rastogi's younger sister.
- Satish Kaushik as Pappu Pager
- Anu Kapoor as Munnu Mobile
- Paresh Rawal as Commissioner Ranvir Singh
- Mukesh Rishi as Ajit Kapoor, Pillai's brother.
- Ashish Vidyarthi as Pillai Kapoor
- Avtar Gill as Inspector Sayaji Shinde
- Ram Mohan as Jhammu
- Navin Nischol as Dr. DD
- Supriya Karnik as Dr. DD's Wife
- Ali Asgar as Bablu
- Himani Shivpuri as Ramgopal's Wife
- Shashi Kiran as Sadanand
- Rajpal Yadav as Thief
- Vivek Vaswani as Doctor
- Viju Khote as Pandit Damu
- Razzak Khan as Jabbar Munna Bhai's Man
- Javed Khan
- Shahbaz Khan as Killer Chakradhari

== Reception ==
Taran Adarsh of IndiaFM gave the film three out of five stars, writing, "The result: Laughter. Fun. Paisa-vasool entertainment. The drama gets a little more amusing thanks to the great chemistry between Amitabh Bachchan and Sanjay Dutt. Dutt is superb as the don. This is amongst his finest performances. Ajay Devgan looks ill at ease in light scenes. Also, he looks pale at places. Aishwarya Rai looks gorgeous and delivers a freewheeling performance".

Syed Firdaus Ashraf of Rediff gave a negative review, writing, "The film fails to hold the attention, thanks mainly due to the implausible plot. The digs at the Mumbai police force, however, are entertaining. Among the performances, Amitabh Bachchan and Sanjay Dutt keep the viewers engaged in the beginning but they irritate post-intermission. Aishwarya Rai does not have too meaty a part. All she does is attend dance class and fret at the thought of Munnabhai wanting to marry her. Ajay Devgan is a disaster. His underwritten character fails to do him justice. Paresh Rawal in the role of a Police Commissioner is wasted too". The Hindu stated "If you can overlook the unreality of mainstream Hindi cinema and its elements (for instance the overly colourful sets and décor) this is a film you might just enjoy. Amitabh again proves that comedy is also his forte. Ajay looks good but is not as effective as Sunjay Dutt who makes a delightful don, clumsy and spirited, a role most well done. As for Aishwarya, she does not have much to do except look gorgeous".

Manish Gajjar from BBC said "Hum Kisise Kum Nahin might just end up to be the best of the lot as far as Bollywood comedies are concerned. In this flick, director David Dhawan gives his best to bring out the laughter as it progresses through the story. Amitabh Bachchan as Dr Rastogi he is once again at his comic best. The same applies to Sanjay Dutt, its very refreshing to see that side of him, compared with the macho image which he always portrays on screen. As for Aishwarya, she looks beautiful as ever and excels in the peppy song sequences. But its Ajay Devgan who surprises us with his versatile comic performance, which he enacts with great ease".

== Soundtrack ==
Hum Kisise Kum Nahin

Soundtrack album by Anu Malik
- Released: 2 March 2002
- Genre: Hindi Film Soundtrack
- Label: T-Series
- Producer: Anu Malik

The soundtrack features 7 songs composed by Anu Malik, with lyrics written by Anand Bakshi. The song "Music Part" was not included in the film, it was a bonus instrumental added to the soundtrack.dulhe raja song is very popular in audiences

Track #	Song	Singer(s)	Duration
1	"Yeh Kya Ho Raha Hai"	Alka Yagnik, Sonu Nigam, Anu Malik	8:20
2	"Dulhe Raja"	Alka Yagnik, Udit Narayan	7:23
3	"Munna Mobile"	Sonu Nigam, Anu Malik	6:21
4	"O Sapnon Ke Saudagar"	Anuradha Paudwal, Sonu Nigam	7:55
5	"Kya Kehna Mere Sher Ka"	Udit Narayan, Vinod Rathod	5:25
6	"Main Sohni Tu Mahiwal"	Anuradha Paudwal, Sonu Nigam, Vinod Rathod	8:29
7	"Dulhe Raja"	Udit Narayan	5:20
8	"Music Part"	Instrumental	3:10
