= Crazy Kutumba =

- Directed by: B Ramamurthy
- Written by: Atul Kale; Sudesh Manjrekar
- Produced by: Ravi Joshi
- Starring: Ramesh Aravind; Ananth Nag
- Cinematography: K. Mallikarjun; Ramesh Appi
- Edited by: Narahalli Jnanesh
- Music by: Ricky Kej; Mysore Ananthaswamy
- Production company: Luv Kush Productions
- Release date: 12 February 2010
- Running time: 125 minutes
- Country: India
- Language: Kannada

Crazy Kutumba (transl. Crazy family) is a 2010 Kannada comedy film directed by B. Ramamurthy and produced by Ravi Joshi for Luv Kush Productions banner. The story is a remake of Marathi film De Dhakka (2008) which was inspired from the Hollywood film, Little Miss Sunshine (2006).

The film stars Ramesh Aravind and Ananth Nag with Sanathini, Dhanya Rao, Jai Jagadish, Bank Janardhan and other theater artistes from North Karnataka region playing supporting roles.

== Cast ==
- Ramesh Aravind as Shankar Patil
- Ananth Nag as Mallanna
- Sanathini as Sumathi
- Chindodi Veershankar
- M. S. Umesh
- Rajinikanth
- Jai Jagadish
- Karibasavaiah
- Bank Janardhan
- G. Bharathkumar
- Baby Dhanya Rao as Gowri
- Shanoor Sana

== Plot ==
A family travels from a village to Bangalore, as one of its members is to participate in a dance contest. En route, the conflicts and travails of the family come to the fore in a humorous manner.

== Soundtrack ==
Crazy Kutumba

Soundtrack album by Ricky Kej
- Released: March 2008
- Genre: Feature film soundtrack
- Label: Anand Audio

Ricky Kej chronology
Venkata in Sankata (2009)	Crazy Kutumba (2008)

The music was composed by Ricky Kej for Junglee music company. One song "Amma Naanu" is composed by Mysore Ananthaswamy. The soundtrack includes popular folk poems written by acclaimed poets such as Kuvempu and K. S. Narasimhaswamy.

Track listing
No.	Title	Lyrics	Singer(s)	Length
1.	"Amma Naanu (originally composed by Mysore Ananthaswamy and rearranged by Ricky Kej)"	H. S. Venkateshmurthy	Shreya Ghoshal	05:40
2.	"Hendathi Obbalu"	K. S. Narasimhaswamy	Rajesh Krishnan	03:41
3.	"Nade Mundhe"	Kuvempu	Avinash Chebbi, Avinash Bharadwaj	04:36
4.	"Naanagiddare Shrimantha"	Jayanth Kaikini	Rajesh Krishnan	04:27
5.	"Banthu Banthu"	Avinash Chebbi	Avinash Chebbi	01:21
6.	"Chori Chori"	Avinash Chebbi	M. D. Pallavi Arun	01:50
7.	"Nee Badalaadare"	Avinash Chebbi	B. Jayashree, M. D. Pallavi Arun, Avinash Chebbi, Rajesh Krishnan, Badri Prasad, L. N. Shastry	03:59
8.	"Main Chulbuli Hoon"	Avinash Chebbi	Avinash Chebbi, Sinchan Dixit	01:30

== Reception ==
=== Critical response ===
Shruti Indira Lakshminarayana of Rediff.com scored the film at 3 out of 5 stars and says "As the characters are from Belgaum, they speak Kannada in the North Karnataka style that too very convincingly. Coming to humour, it is the scenes between Anath Nag and Ramesh that mostly invite laughter. The comedian in Rajinikanth (who plays kleptomaniac) impresses only at a few places. Also the film could have done without Sundari's character. A critic from The New Indian Express wrote "Veteran actor Anant Nag shines in the role of a drunkard father. Well-known comedians Umesh and Karibasavayya have played their parts with ease. The newcomers Sanathini, Natana Rajanikanth, who plays a kleptomaniac, Veera Shankar, Vijayakumar and child artist Dhanya really impress and surely can be groomed further for future roles". A critic from Deccan Herald wrote "Ramesh as the sixth-pass genius, husband, disgruntled son and doting father is good. His attempt at learning a different dialect is praiseworthy. Anant Nag, the grizzled, liquor guzzling patriarch caresses each word lovingly. Rajnikant and Vijaykumar provide most of the lighter moments in the film. Baby Nityashree’s innocent look blends in" A critic from Bangalore Mirror wrote "The dialect is from north Karnataka but it has been kept simple enough for comprehension. The comedy, except, for scenes involving Rajinikanth, is subdued. Thankfully Ricky Kej’s music is not loud and the songs blend with the film. Crazy Kutumba is a film parents would want to take their children to".
