= Sunanda Murali Manohar =

Indian-British film producer and entrepreneur

- Born: Sunanda Mandre; 10 September 1957
- Died: 30 December 2017 (aged 60)
- Spouse: J. Murali Manohar
- Relatives: Sharmila Mandre (niece); Ramananda Narayanrao Mandre (father)

Sunanda Murali Manohar (10 September 1957 – 30 December 2017) was an Indian-British film producer and entrepreneur, based in London, United Kingdom. She has produced, along with her husband, Dr. J. Murali Manohar (an ENT Surgeon), several Indian, American and British films, including Indian Summer (British 1987), Blood Stone (US 1988), Jungle Boy (US 2001), Tropical Heat (US 2002), Inferno (US 2006), Jeans (1998 film), Jeans (Tamil 1998), JODI (Tamil 1999), Minnale (Tamil 2001), Majnu (Tamil 2002), Arasatchi (Tamil 2003), Backwaters (English/UK 2004), Ramji Londonwale (Hindi 2005), Telling Lies (English/UK 2005), Provoked (English/UK 2006), Sajni (Kannada 2007), Dhaam Dhoom (Tamil 2008), Mirattal (2012), Chikku Bukku (Tamil 2010), and Kochadaiiyaan (2014).

In 2001, she launched "South for You", a south Indian Tamil Channel on Sky network in Great Britain, and was running it till 2011. When she sold it, the channel was taken over by UTV.

== Personal life ==
She is the daughter of Ramananda Narayanrao Mandre, a veteran in Production, Distribution and Exhibition of Hindi and Kannada films for more than 50 years, who built the first air-conditioned theater Sangam, in Bangalore and Mysore. Sharmila Mandre, a popular Kannada actor and producer, is her niece.

== Death ==
She died on 30 December 2017.

== Filmography ==
- Indian Summer (UK) English (1997)
- Bloodstone (US) English (1988)
- Tropical Heat (US) English 2001
- Jungle Boy (US) English (2001)
- Inferno (US) English (1994)
- Jeans (1998)
- Kaadhal Kavithai (1998)
- Jodi (1999)
- Minnale (2001)
- Majunu (2001)
- Arasatchi (2004)
- Ramji Londonwale (2005)
- Thambi (2006)
- Sajni (2006) (Kannada)
- Provoked (2007)
- Dhaam Dhoom (2008)
- Modhi Vilayadu (2009)
- Chikku Bukku (2010)
- Mirattal (2012)
- Kochadaiiyaan (2014)
- Aake (2017) (Kannada)
