= Shivamani =

2009 Indian Kannada-language film

- Directed by: S K Amarnath
- Produced by: Jagannath V Pai
- Starring: Sriimurali; Sharmiela Mandre
- Cinematography: Sri Venkat
- Edited by: Suresh Urs
- Music by: Veer Samarth
- Release date: 16 January 2009
- Country: India
- Language: Kannada

Shivamani is a 2009 Indian Kannada-language film directed by S K Amarnath, starring Sriimurali and Sharmiela Mandre in lead roles.

== Cast ==
- Sriimurali as Siva
- Sharmiela Mandre as Shruthi
- Ramesh Bhat
- Avinash as Subbanna
- Vinaya Prasad
- Shobaraj as Nakarar Narayana
- Kote Prabhakar
- Mahesh
- Besant Ravi

== Music ==
Shivamani

Soundtrack album by Veer Samarth
- Released: 2009
- Recorded: 2009
- Genre: Feature film soundtrack
- Length: 32:11
- Language: Kannada

Official audio
- Shivamani- Full Album on YouTube

Track listing
No.	Title	Singer(s)	Length
1.	"Mari Jinkemari"	Hemanth Kumar, Shamitha Malnad	4:22
2.	"Moda Modalu"	Karthik, Shreya Ghoshal	4:45
3.	"Nee Hinde Bandaga"	Hariharan, Sadhana Sargam	4:44
4.	"Rama Rama"	Sonu Kakkar	4:47
5.	"Shivamani"	Shankar Mahadevan	4:43
6.	"Shivamani Theme"	Veer Samarth	1:17
7.	"Vachana"	Veer Samarth	3:26
8.	"Yaarige Yaaruntu"	S. P. Balasubrahmanyam	5:27
Total length:			32:11

== Reception ==
=== Critical response ===
R G Vijayasarathy of Rediff.com scored the film at 1.5 out of 5 stars and says "The film is digitally graded and Venkat's cinematographic work is good. Debutant Veera Samarth has delivered two nice compositions including the popular Moda Modala Nota. Overall, however it's best to avoid this torture". The New Indian Express wrote "Meanwhile, Narayan’s henchman tries to rape a widow. This enrages Siva, prompting him to teach Narayana a lesson. And of course, Narayana does not keep quiet. He organises several goons to attack Siva. Finally, how Siva teaches Narayana a lesson is the climax. If you are interested in watching an out-and-out action film, you could consider booking your tickets for this one". Bangalore Mirror wrote "Except for pleasing images and some good music by Veer Samarth there is nothing in the film that you want to even remember".
