= Kari Chirathe =

Kari Chirathe (ಕರಿ ಚರಿತೆ)
- Directed by: K Madesh
- Produced by: Krishnayya
- Starring: Duniya Vijay; Sharmila Mandre; Yagna Shetty; Rangayana Raghu
- Cinematography: Veenus Murthy
- Edited by: Shashikumar
- Music by: Sadhu Kokila
- Release date: September 3, 2010
- Country: India
- Language: Kannada

Kari Chirathe (Kannada: ಕರಿ ಚರಿತೆ) is a 2010 Indian Kannada-language film directed by K Madesh, starring Duniya Vijay, Sharmila Mandre, Yagna Shetty and Rangayana Raghu in lead roles.

== Cast ==
- Duniya Vijay as Madha
- Sharmila Mandre
- Yagna Shetty as Bharti
- Rangayana Raghu
- Imran Khan
- Raghav Uday
- Anil Kumar
- Umesh Punga
- Jai Jagadish

== Music ==
Kari Chirathe

Soundtrack album by Sadhu Kokila
- Released: 2010
- Recorded: 2010
- Genre: Feature film soundtrack
- Length: 25:32
- Language: Kannada

Official audio
- Kari Chirathe - Full Album on YouTube

Track listing
No.	Title	Singer(s)	Length
1.	"Mathadu Mathadu Madeva"	Kailash Kher	5:10
2.	"My Name Is Kari Chirathe"	Tippu, Chaithra	5:06
3.	"Shivakasi Bombu Naanu"	Anoop Seelin, Megha	3:51
4.	"Idli Vade Thinnodakke"	Vijay, Sunitha S, Usha	4:45
5.	"Shivane Shivane"	Rajesh Krishnan	3:14
6.	"Gumthaane Gumthaane"	Hemanth Kumar, Usha	4:06
Total length:			25:32

== Reception ==
The film received mixed to negative reviews from critics. The Times of India gave the film 3 out of 5 stars. Sify, in their review, wrote- "Kari Chirathe adds to the list of so-called action potboilers which have hit the screens in almost all the languages in the country. The story lacks freshness". Shruti Indira Lakshminarayana of Rediff.com scored the film at 1.5 out of 5 stars and says "Yagna hopes to bring out her oomph factor. She had proved her mettle in Edelu Manjunatha and Sugreeva, but fails to impress this time. Sudha Belavadi, who has time and again come out with good performances, also falters. Kari Chirate could have been an ideal mass entertainer, but fails". Bangalore Mirror wrote "Sharmila is believable as a domicile unglamorous wife, yet delectable, particularly in songs. Rangayana Raghu softens his histrionics but gets the maximum applause from the crowd for his performance. The songs are pleasant to watch and with a commendable cinematography to boot, Kari Chirathe makes for a decent film".
