= List of films based on poems =

This is a list of films based on poems.

== A ==
Poem	Film(s)
The Actes and Deidis of the Illustre and Vallyeant Campioun Schir William Wallace (1488), Blind Harry	Braveheart (1995)
Aeneid (29–19 BC), Publius Vergilius Maro	The Avenger (1962)
"Annabel Lee" (1850), Edgar Allan Poe	The Avenging Conscience (1914)
Argonautica (3rd century BC), Apollonius Rhodius	Hercules (Italian: Le Fatiche di Ercole) (1958)
Argonautica (3rd century BC), Apollonius Rhodius	The Giants of Thessaly (1960)
Argonautica (3rd century BC), Apollonius Rhodius	Jason and the Argonauts (1963)
Aniara (Swedish: Aniara: en revy om människan i tid och rum) (1956), Harry Martinson	Aniara (2018)
"Ashik Kerib" (Russian: Ашик Кериб) (1837), Mikhail Lermontov	Ashik Kerib (1988)

== B ==
Poem	Film(s)
Ballad of Mulan (386–535 CE)	Mulan (1998)
Ballad of Mulan (386–535 CE)	Mulan (2020)
Banović Strahinja (Serbian Cyrillic: Бановић Страхиња)	The Falcon (1981)
Banović Strahinja (Serbian Cyrillic: Бановић Страхиња)	As Far as I Can Walk (2021)
Beowulf (c. 700–1000 AD)	Grendel Grendel Grendel (1981)
Beowulf (c. 700–1000 AD)	Beowulf (1999)
Beowulf (c. 700–1000 AD)	Beowulf & Grendel (2005)
Beowulf (c. 700–1000 AD)	Grendel (2007)
Beowulf (c. 700–1000 AD)	Beowulf (2007)
"Bright Star" (1838), John Keats	Bright Star (2009)

== C ==
Poem	Film(s)
"Casey at the Bat: A Ballad of the Republic, Sung in the Year 1888" (1888), Ernest Thayer	Casey at the Bat (1916)
"Casey at the Bat: A Ballad of the Republic, Sung in the Year 1888" (1888), Ernest Thayer	Casey at the Bat (1927)
"Casey at the Bat: A Ballad of the Republic, Sung in the Year 1888" (1888), Ernest Thayer	Make Mine Music (1946)
"The Charge of the Light Brigade" (1854), Alfred, Lord Tennyson	Balaclava (1928)
"The Charge of the Light Brigade" (1854), Alfred, Lord Tennyson	The Charge of the Light Brigade (1912)
"The Charge of the Light Brigade" (1854), Alfred, Lord Tennyson	The Charge of the Light Brigade (1936)
"The Charge of the Light Brigade" (1854), Alfred, Lord Tennyson	The Charge of the Light Brigade (1968)
"The City in the Sea" (1845), Edgar Allan Poe	City Under the Sea (1965)
Cilappatikāram (Tamil: சிலப்பதிகாரம், Malayalam: ചിലപ്പതികാരം, IPA: ʧiləppət̪ikɑːrəm, lit. "the Tale of an Anklet"), Ilango Adigal	Kannagi (1942)
Cilappatikāram (Tamil: சிலப்பதிகாரம், Malayalam: ചിലപ്പതികാരം, IPA: ʧiləppət̪ikɑːrəm, lit. "the Tale of an Anklet"), Ilango Adigal	Poompuhar (1962)
Cilappatikāram (Tamil: சிலப்பதிகாரம், Malayalam: ചിലപ്പതികാരം, IPA: ʧiləppət̪ikɑːrəm, lit. "the Tale of an Anklet"), Ilango Adigal	Kodungallooramma (1968)
Cilappatikāram (Tamil: சிலப்பதிகாரம், Malayalam: ചിലപ്പതികാരം, IPA: ʧiləppət̪ikɑːrəm, lit. "the Tale of an Anklet"), Ilango Adigal	Paththini (2016)
The Courtship of Miles Standish (1858), Henry Wadsworth Longfellow	The Courtship of Miles Standish (1923)

== D ==
Poem	Film(s)
De reditu suo (5th century), Rutilius Claudius Namatianus	The Voyage Home (Latin: De reditu; Italian: Il ritorno, lit. 'The Return') (2004)
Divine Comedy (Italian: Divina Commedia) (1321), Dante Alighieri	L'Inferno (1911)
Divine Comedy (Italian: Divina Commedia) (1321), Dante Alighieri	Dante's Inferno (1924)
Divine Comedy (Italian: Divina Commedia) (1321), Dante Alighieri	Dante's Inferno (1935)
Divine Comedy (Italian: Divina Commedia) (1321), Dante Alighieri	The Deep and Dreamless Sleep (2006)
Divine Comedy (Italian: Divina Commedia) (1321), Dante Alighieri	Dante's Inferno (2007)
Don Juan (1819–24), Lord Byron	Don Juan (1926)
"Dui Bigha Jomi", Rabindranath Tagore	Do Bigha Zamin (1953)

== E ==
Poem	Film(s)
Enoch Arden (1864), Alfred, Lord Tennyson	Enoch Arden (1914)
Enoch Arden (1864), Alfred, Lord Tennyson	The Bushwhackers (1925)
Enoch Arden (1864), Alfred, Lord Tennyson	Nirmon (1966)
Enoch Arden (1864), Alfred, Lord Tennyson	Taqdeer (1967)
Evangeline, A Tale of Acadie (1847), Henry Wadsworth Longfellow	Evangeline (1914)
Evangeline, A Tale of Acadie (1847), Henry Wadsworth Longfellow	Evangeline (1919)
Evangeline, A Tale of Acadie (1847), Henry Wadsworth Longfellow	Evangeline (1929)

== G ==
Poem	Film(s)
Gunga Din (1890), Rudyard Kipling	Gunga Din (1939)

== H ==
Poem	Film(s)
Hard Core Logo by Michael Turner	Hard Cord Logo (1996)
Heer Ranjha (Punjabi: ہیر رانجھا (Shahmukhi), ਹੀਰ ਰਾਂਝਾ (Gurmukhi)) (17th century), Waris Shah	Heer Ranjha (1932)
Heer Ranjha (Punjabi: ہیر رانجھا (Shahmukhi), ਹੀਰ ਰਾਂਝਾ (Gurmukhi)) (17th century), Waris Shah	Heer Sial (1938)
Heer Ranjha (Punjabi: ہیر رانجھا (Shahmukhi), ਹੀਰ ਰਾਂਝਾ (Gurmukhi)) (17th century), Waris Shah	Heer Raanjha (1970)
Heer Ranjha (Punjabi: ہیر رانجھا (Shahmukhi), ਹੀਰ ਰਾਂਝਾ (Gurmukhi)) (17th century), Waris Shah	Heer Ranjha (1992)
The Highwayman (1906), Alfred Noyes	The Highwayman (1951)
The Song of Hiawatha (1855), Henry Wadsworth Longfellow	Hiawatha (1913)
The Song of Hiawatha (1855), Henry Wadsworth Longfellow	Hiawatha (1952)
Howl (1956), Allen Ginsberg	Howl (2010)

== I ==
Poem	Film(s)
Iliad (c. 8th century BC), Homer	Helena (1924)
Iliad (c. 8th century BC), Homer	Helen of Troy (1956)
Iliad (c. 8th century BC), Homer	The Fury of Achilles (Italian: L'ira di Achille) (1962)
Iliad (c. 8th century BC), Homer	Hector the Mighty (Italian: Ettore lo fusto) (1972)
Iliad (c. 8th century BC), Homer	Troy (2004)
"Invitation to the Voyage" (French: L'Invitation au voyage) (1857), Charles Baudelaire	L'Invitation au voyage (1927)

== J ==
Poem	Film(s)
"Jabberwocky" (1871), Lewis Carroll	Jabberwocky (1977)
John the Valiant (Hungarian: János vitéz) (1844), Sándor Petőfi	Johnny Corncob (Hungarian: Kukorica Jancsi) (1973)
Jerusalem Delivered (Italian: La Gerusalemme liberata) (1581), Torquato Tasso	The Crusaders (1918)
Jerusalem Delivered (Italian: La Gerusalemme liberata) (1581), Torquato Tasso	The Mighty Crusaders (1957)

== K ==
Poem	Film(s)
Kaliyachan (1959), P. Kunhiraman Nair	Kaliyachan (2015)
Kein Hüsung (1858), Fritz Reuter	Kein Hüsung (1954)
Kumārasambhava (Sanskrit: कुमारसम्भवम्, "The Birth of Kumāra"), Kālidāsa	Kumara Sambhavam (1969)
Kundalakesi (Tamil: குண்டலகேசி Kuṇṭalakēci, lit. "woman with curly hair")	Manthiri Kumari (1950)

== L ==
Poem	Film(s)
Lady Clare (1842), Alfred, Lord Tennyson	The Lady Clare (1919)
The Lady of the Lake (1810), Sir Walter Scott	The Lady of the Lake (1928)
Lalla Rookh (1817), Thomas Moore	Lala Rookh (1958)
"The Law of the Yukon" (1907), Robert W. Service	The Law of the Yukon (1920)
The Light of Asia (1879), Edwin Arnold	Prem Sanyas (1925)
The Little Humpbacked Horse (Russian: Конёк-Горбуно́к, romanized: Konyok-Gorbunok) (1834), Pyotr Pavlovich Yershov	The Little Humpbacked Horse (1941)
The Little Humpbacked Horse (Russian: Конёк-Горбуно́к, romanized: Konyok-Gorbunok) (1834), Pyotr Pavlovich Yershov	The Little Humpbacked Horse (1947)
The Little Humpbacked Horse (Russian: Конёк-Горбуно́к, romanized: Konyok-Gorbunok) (1834), Pyotr Pavlovich Yershov	The Little Humpbacked Horse (1975)
The Little Humpbacked Horse (Russian: Конёк-Горбуно́к, romanized: Konyok-Gorbunok) (1834), Pyotr Pavlovich Yershov	Upon the Magic Roads (2021)
"Little Orphant Annie" (1885), James Whitcomb Riley	Little Orphant Annie (1918)
"Lützow's Wild Hunt" (German: Lützows wilde verwegene Jagd), Theodor Körner	Lützow's Wild Hunt (1927)

== M ==
Poem	Film(s)
The Man from Snowy River (1890), Banjo Paterson	The Man from Snowy River (1920)
The Man from Snowy River (1890), Banjo Paterson	The Man from Snowy River (1982)
The Man from Snowy River (1890), Banjo Paterson	The Man from Snowy River II (1988)
Martín Fierro (1872), José Hernández	Fierro (2007)
Mattie the Goose-boy (Hungarian: Lúdas Matyi) (1817), Mihály Fazekas	Mattie the Goose-boy (1950)
Mattie the Goose-boy (Hungarian: Lúdas Matyi) (1817), Mihály Fazekas	Mattie the Goose-boy (1977)
"Maud" (1855), Alfred, Lord Tennyson	Naked Hearts (1916)
Metamorphoses (8), Ovid	Metamorphoses (1978)
Metamorphoses (8), Ovid	Métamorphoses (2014)
The Monkey's Mask (1994), Dorothy Porter	The Monkey's Mask (2000)
"My Madonna" (1907), Robert W. Service	My Madonna (1915)
Mysooru Mallige (1942), K. S. Narasimhaswamy	Mysore Mallige (1992)

== N ==
Poem	Film(s)
Nibelungenlied (c. 1200)	Die Nibelungen (1924)
Nibelungenlied (c. 1200)	The Dragon's Blood (Italian: Sigfrido) (1957)
Nibelungenlied (c. 1200)	Die Nibelungen (1966–67)
Nibelungenlied (c. 1200)	Dark Kingdom: The Dragon King (2004)

== O ==
Poem	Film(s)
Odyssey (8th century BC), Homer	The Odyssey (Italian: L'Odissea) (1911)
Odyssey (8th century BC), Homer	Ulysses (1955)
Odyssey (8th century BC), Homer	The Odyssey (1987)
Odyssey (8th century BC), Homer	Nostos: The Return (Italian: Nostos: Il ritorno) (1989)
Odyssey (8th century BC), Homer	Ulysses' Gaze (Greek: Το βλέμμα του Οδυσσέα, To Vlemma tou Odyssea) (1995)
Odyssey (8th century BC), Homer	O Brother, Where Art Thou? (2000)
Odyssey (8th century BC), Homer	Odysseus and the Isle of the Mists (2007)
Odyssey (8th century BC), Homer	The Return (2024)
Odyssey (8th century BC), Homer	The Odyssey (2026)
The Old Swimmin' Hole (1883), James Whitcomb Riley	The Old Swimmin' Hole (1921)
Orlando Furioso (1516), Ludovico Ariosto	Hearts and Armour (Italian: I Paladini: Storia d'armi e d'amori) (1983)
Over the Hill to the Poorhouse (1872), Will Carleton	Over the Hill to the Poorhouse (1920)
Over the Hill to the Poorhouse (1872), Will Carleton	Over the Hill (1931)

== P ==
Poem	Film(s)
Padmavat (1540), Malik Muhammad Jayasi	Padmaavat (2018)
Pan Tadeusz (1834), Adam Mickiewicz	Pan Tadeusz (1928)
Pan Tadeusz (1834), Adam Mickiewicz	Pan Tadeusz (1999)
Paterson (1946–58), William Carlos Williams	Paterson (2016)
Perceval, the Story of the Grail (French: Perceval ou le Conte du Graal) (1182–90), Chrétien de Troyes	Perceval le Gallois (1978)
Phra Aphai Mani (Thai: พระอภัยมณี) (1870), Sunthorn Phu	The Adventure of Sudsakorn (1979)
Phra Aphai Mani (Thai: พระอภัยมณี) (1870), Sunthorn Phu	Legend of Sudsakorn (Thai: สุดสาคร) (2006)
"The Pied Piper of Hamelin" (1842), Robert Browning	The Pied Piper of Hamelin (1957)
Poema de Fernán González (1250–66)	The Castilian (1963)
Prithviraj Raso, Chand Bardai	Samrat Prithviraj (2022)
The Prophet (1923), Kahlil Gibran	The Prophet (2014)
Pumpkinhead, Ed Justin	Pumpkinhead (1988)

== R ==
Poem	Film(s)
Ramanan (Malayalam: രമണന്‍) (1936), Changampuzha Krishna Pillai	Ramanan (1967)
"The Raven" (1845), Edgar Allan Poe	The Raven (1963)
"A Revery in the Station House" (1916), Ella Wheeler Wilcox	The Beautiful Lie (1917)
The Rime of the Ancient Mariner (1798), Samuel Taylor Coleridge	The Ancient Mariner (1925)

== S ==
Poem	Film(s)
The Set-Up (1928), Joseph Moncure March	The Set-Up (1949)
Shahnameh (1010), Ferdowsi	Shirin Farhad (1931)
Shahnameh (1010), Ferdowsi	Shirin Farhad (1956)
Shahnameh (1010), Ferdowsi	Rustam Sohrab (1963)
Shahnameh (1010), Ferdowsi	Shirin Farhad Ki Toh Nikal Padi (2012)
"The Shooting of Dan McGrew" (1907), Robert W. Service	The Shooting of Dan McGrew (1915)
"The Shooting of Dan McGrew" (1907), Robert W. Service	The Shooting of Dan McGrew (1924)
"The Sick Stockrider" (1870), Adam Lindsay Gordon	The Sick Stockrider (1913)
Sir Gawain and the Green Knight (late 14th century), Gawain Poet (anonymous)	Gawain and the Green Knight (1973)
Sir Gawain and the Green Knight (late 14th century), Gawain Poet (anonymous)	Sword of the Valiant (1984)
Sir Gawain and the Green Knight (late 14th century), Gawain Poet (anonymous)	The Green Knight (2021)
'Song of Songs (Biblical Hebrew: שִׁיר הַשִּׁירִים, romanized: Šīr hašŠīrīm; Greek: Άσμα Ασμάτων; Latin: Canticum Canticorum)	The Song (2014)
"The Song of the Wage-Slave" (1907), Robert W. Service	The Song of the Wage Slave (1915)
The Songs of a Sentimental Bloke (1915), C. J. Dennis	The Sentimental Bloke (1919)
"The Spell of the Yukon" (1907), Robert W. Service	The Lure of Heart's Desire (1916)
"The Spell of the Yukon" (1907), Robert W. Service	The Spell of the Yukon (1916)
"Sweet and Low" (1849), Alfred, Lord Tennyson	Sweet and Low (1914)

== T ==
Poem	Film(s)
"The Tale of the Priest and of his Workman Balda" (Russian: Сказка о попе и о работнике его Балде) (1830), Alexander Pushkin	The Tale of the Priest and of His Workman Balda (1933–36)
The Tale of Tsar Saltan, of His Son the Renowned and Mighty Bogatyr Prince Gvidon Saltanovich, and of the Beautiful Princess-Swan (Russian: Сказка о царе Салтане, о сыне его славном и могучем богатыре князе Гвидоне Салтановиче и о прекрасной царевне Лебеди) (1831), Aleksandr Pushkin	The Tale of Tsar Saltan (1966)
The Tale of Tsar Saltan, of His Son the Renowned and Mighty Bogatyr Prince Gvidon Saltanovich, and of the Beautiful Princess-Swan (Russian: Сказка о царе Салтане, о сыне его славном и могучем богатыре князе Гвидоне Салтановиче и о прекрасной царевне Лебеди) (1831), Aleksandr Pushkin	The Tale of Tsar Saltan (1984)
Terje Vigen (1862), Henrik Ibsen	A Man There Was (Swedish: Terje Vigen) (1917)
Terje Vigen (1862), Henrik Ibsen	The Lake Calls (German: Das Meer ruft) (1933)
"Trees" (1913), Joyce Kilmer	Melody Time (1948)
Typhoid Sufferers (Serbo-Croatian: Tifusari) (1950), Jure Kaštelan	Typhoid Sufferers (1963)

== U ==
Poem	Film(s)
Under Milk Wood (1954), Dylan Thomas	Under Milk Wood (1972)
Under Milk Wood (1954), Dylan Thomas	Under Milk Wood (2015)

== V ==
Poem	Film(s)
Valayapathi (Tamil: வளையாபதி)	Valayapathi (1952)
The Vampire (1897), Rudyard Kipling	The Vampire (1913)
The Village Blacksmith (1840), Henry Wadsworth Longfellow	The Village Blacksmith (1917)
The Village Blacksmith (1840), Henry Wadsworth Longfellow	The Village Blacksmith (1922)
A Visit from St. Nicholas (1823), Clement Clarke Moore	The Night Before Christmas (1994)

== W ==
Poem	Film(s)
The White Cliffs (1940), Alice Duer Miller	The White Cliffs of Dover (1944)
A Bouquet of Folk Legends (Czech: Kytice z pověstí národních) (1853), Karel Jaromír Erben	Wild Flowers (Czech: Kytice) (2000)
The Wild Party (1926), Joseph Moncure March	The Wild Party (1975)
The Wind Will Carry Us (Persian: باد ما را خواهد برد, Bād mā rā khāhad bord) (1964), Forough Farrokhzad	The Wind Will Carry Us (1999)
Winter Days (冬の日, Fuyu no Hi) (1684), Matsuo Bashō	Winter Days (2003)
The Wreck of the Hesperus (1842), Henry Wadsworth Longfellow	The Wreck of the Hesperus (1927)
The Wreck of the Hesperus (1842), Henry Wadsworth Longfellow	The Wreck of the Hesperus (1948)

== See also ==
- Lists of film source material
- List of films based on Greco-Roman mythology
