= Jasmine in Karnataka =

Overview of the flower in the Indian state

Mysore jasmine
- Geographical indication
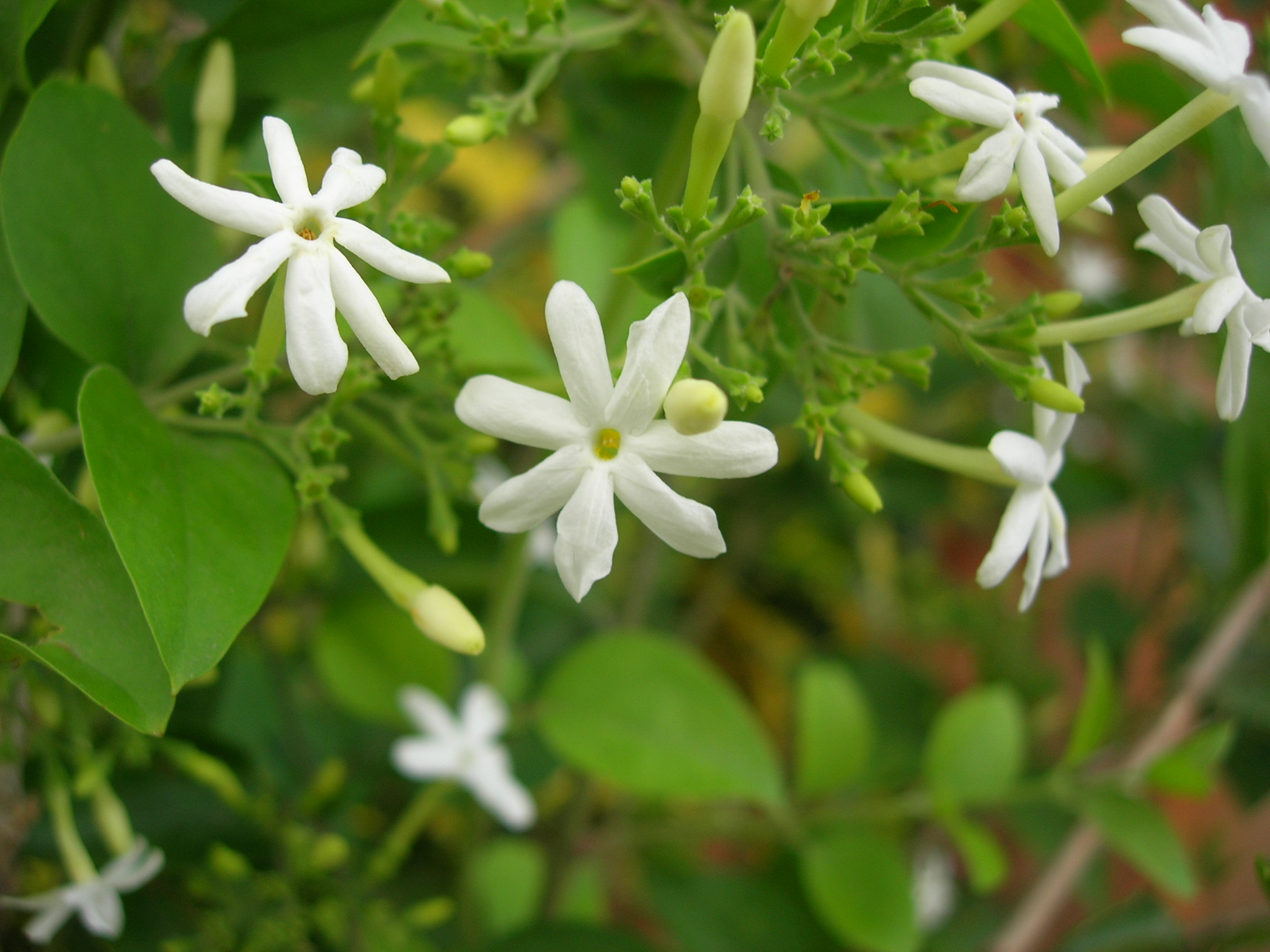
- Mysore Mallige (Jasminum trifoloiatum)
- Alternative names: Mysore Mallige
- Type: Jasminum grandiflorum
- Area: Mysore district
- Country: India
- Registered: 2005
- Official website: http://ipindia.nic.in

Udupi jasmine
- Geographical indication
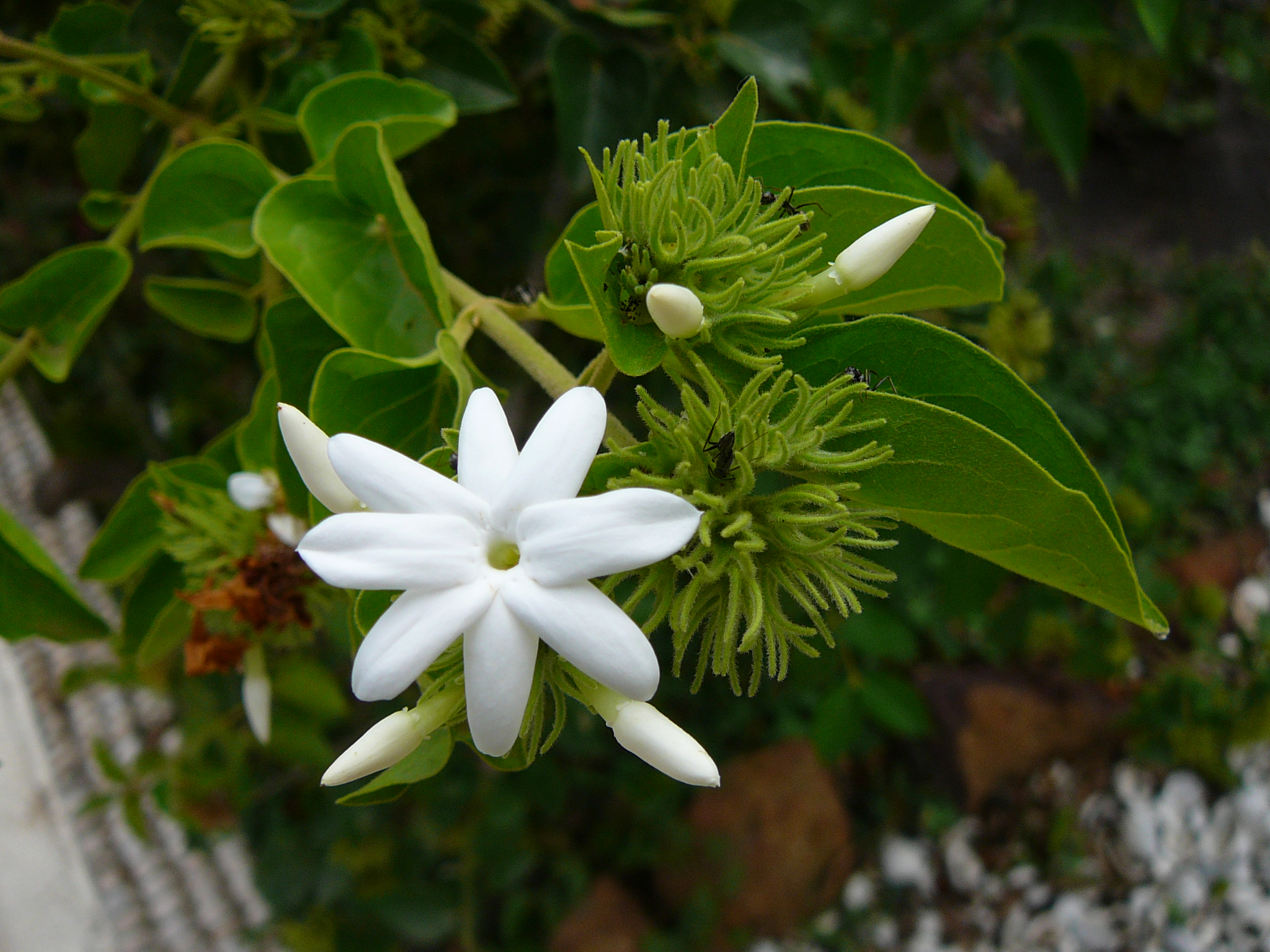
- Udupi Mallige (Jasminum grandiflorum)
- Alternative names: Udupi Mallige
- Type: Jasminum sambac
- Area: udupi district
- Country: India
- Registered: 2005
- Official website: http://ipindia.nic.in

Jasmine is considered the queen of flowers and is called the "Belle of India" or the "Queen of fragrance" as it is exquisitely scented to soothe and refresh. In different parts of India it is called by different names—Mogra, Motia, Chameli, Malli puvvu, Jaati, Mulla, Mallige, Juhi, Mogra or Moonlight in the grove. It is reported that there are 300 varieties of jasmine. It is also stated that jasmine crossed the seas—from Asia to Europe, landing first along the Mediterranean Sea, conquering Greece and Turkey, reaching Western Europe through Spain, then France and Italy and finally landing in England in the latter part of the 17th century. (By the 18th century, jasmine scented gloves became popular in Britain).

Several species of jasmine are grown in Karnataka. Mysore Mallige Botanical name: Jasminum trifoliatum L.) of the family Oleaceae is the most popular among the three varieties of Jasmine endemic to Karnataka; the other two varieties are Hadagali Mallige (Jasminum azoricum Vahl) and Bhatkal Mallige and Udupi Mallige (Jasminum sambac (L.) Aiton). Famed worldwide for their fragrance, all the three flower varieties have been patented and registered under Intellectual Property Right-Geographical Indications of India.

== Mysore Mallige (Jasminum sambac) ==
(Kannada: ಮೈಸೂರು ಮಲ್ಲಿಗೆ This is the most well-known variety, which derives its name since it is grown mostly around Mysore city and partly in Srirangapatna taluk in Mandya district in Karnataka state. The Jasmine's association with the city of Mysore, the royal city of palaces, patronized by the Wodeyar of the Kingdom of Mysore, because its fragrance is as powerful as the famous Dasara festival held every year in the city during October. Mallige grows in profusion in the open areas either in exclusive farmland, in front or at the backyard of houses.

Mysore Mallige, mostly grown in and around Mysore city is a viable crop for small farmers. Farmers reap two crops of this seasonal flower. Apart from the local market, the flower is in demand in parts of Kerala and Tamil Nadu.

=== Botanical description ===
The plant is a scandent, 2 to 3 m (6.6 to 9.8 ft) in height, branchless terete, or slightly compressed sometimes hollow, sparsely pubescent, leaves alternate, trifoliately compound; 1–2 cm (0.39–0.79 in) long, petiole is about 1 cm (0.39 in) long and it has small channel running in the middle, leaf blade ovate to ellipse, 4-8x2-3.5 cm thick, dark green in colour and nerves slightly raised beneath. Cymes, terminal, 1 to 5 flowered bracts subulate, 4–8 mm. Flowers are very fragrant. Pedicel 0.3–2 cm (0.12–0.79 in). Calyx glabrous or sparsely pubescent; lobes 8-9 linear, 5–7 mm. Corolla tube is slightly pinkish, 1.5 cm (0.59 in) long petals pure white, lobes oblong to sub orbicular, 5–9 mm broad,. Berry is purple black, globose, about 1 cm (0.39 in) in diameter.

The sandy loam soil with comparatively high pH prevailing in the region (Mysore and surrounding areas) makes a congenial ground for growing this crop. The dry and warm weather with low humidity is good for the crop. Flowering starts during March–April and continues up to June–July, April –May being the peak season

The essential oil content in the flowers ranges from 0.24 to 0.42 per cent.

=== Principal Aromatic constituents ===
The principal aromatic components are Indol, Jasmone, Benzyl Acetate, Benzyl Benzoate, Methyl Anthranilate, Linalool & Geraniol. Its modern-day applications are in perfumery, cosmetics, Incense, Aroma Therapy and Ayurveda. It is also used externally to soothe dry and sensitive skin.

== Hadagali Mallige (Jasminum azoricum) ==
Hadagali Mallige is known for its rich fragrance and shelf life. Locally known as "Vasane Mallige", (fragrant Jasmine), it is grown mainly in Hoovina Hadagali(Hadagali Flowers) (Especially in the regions of Thippapura, Thimlapur, Honnur Village, Now Formers Going Towards Other economy jowar, paddy, sugarcane) and surrounding areas in Vijayanagara district of Karnataka.

Espically during the period of the King Sri Krishnadevaraya the jasmine flowers were sent to Hampi (A UNESCO World Heritage site) through Tungabhadra River for the worship of lord Virupaksheshwara (the main deity of Vijayanagara Kingdom) from the jasmine farmers of Hadagali.

=== Botanical description ===
Plant is small shrub with little scandent nature. Leaves are simple, thick, margin folded upside, slightly pubescent. Flowers are borne in axillary chymes. Flower with long corolla tube around 1 cm (0.39 in) long. Petals 7, spreading, white in colour.

The sandy red soil prevailing in this region is ideal for cultivation of Hadgali Mallige. The dry weather and good water supply also adds to the congenial environment for the cultivation of this crop. It is propagated mainly through cuttings. Planted directly in the months of July–August on the onset of monsoon. The flowering season spreads up to six months.

Flowers are highly scented and possess good essential oil recovery (0.24 to 0.42%). The flowers are used for extraction of essential oil.

== Udupi Mallige (Jasminum sambac) ==
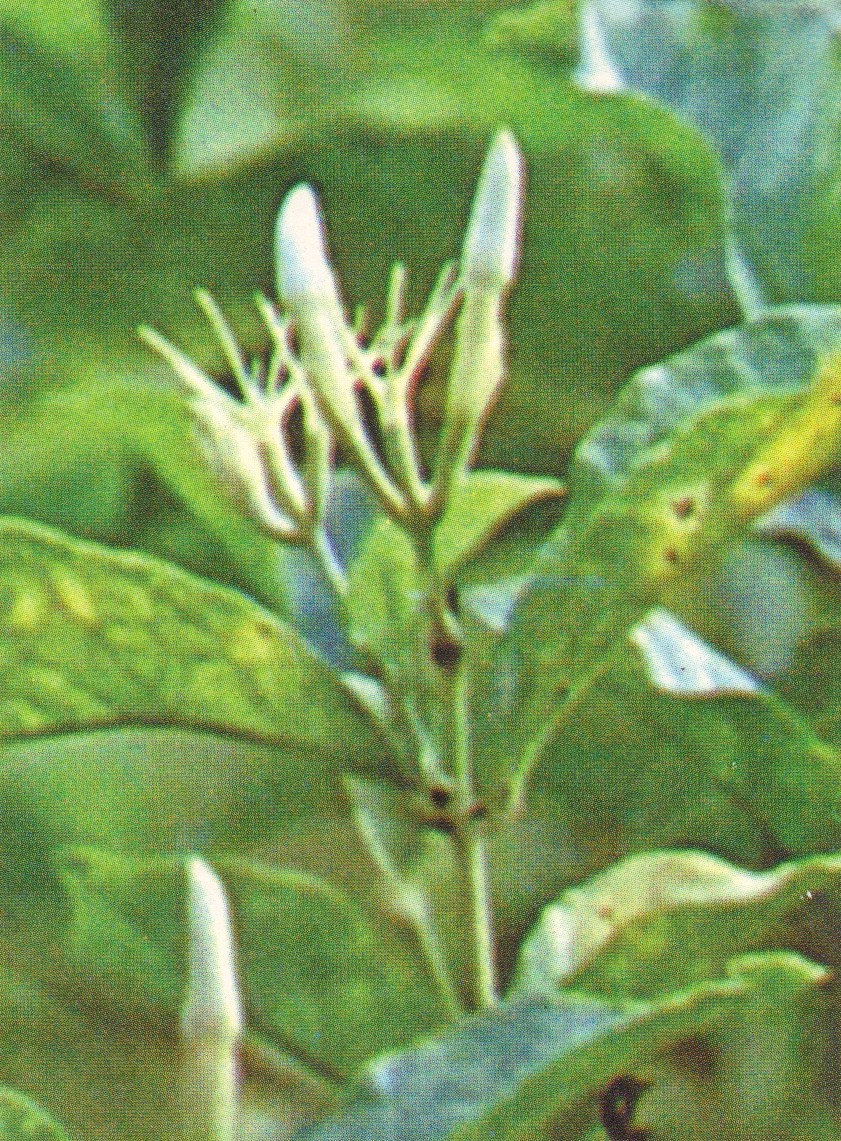
Bhatkal Mallige (Jasminum sambac)

The cultivation of Bhatkal Mallige is of relatively recent origin. Cultivation of this variety of jasmine started in Bhatkal and then Shankarapura in Udupi district about 100 years ago.

It is found extensively in Udupi, Mangaluru District and Uttara Kannada, and has been found more economically viable among all the three varieties. The flower is in high demand in places such as Mumbai, besides the coastal region.

=== Botanical description ===
Plant is a small and bushy with leaves of light green with yellowish shade, 5-7x2.5-3.5 cm, nerves slightly raised beneath, acute at both ends, entire, ovate-lanceolate. Flowers in cymose inflorescence and borne in the axils and also terminal. Calyx 6, petals 6–8, bracteate. Fruits are small, 0.4-0.5 mm in diameter.

The laterite soil condition of the region, high humidity and heavy rainfall (more than 2,500–3,000 mm or 98–118 in per annum) makes area suitable for growing this crop. Propagation is mainly by cuttings. Planting is done in the month August–September.

== Uses ==
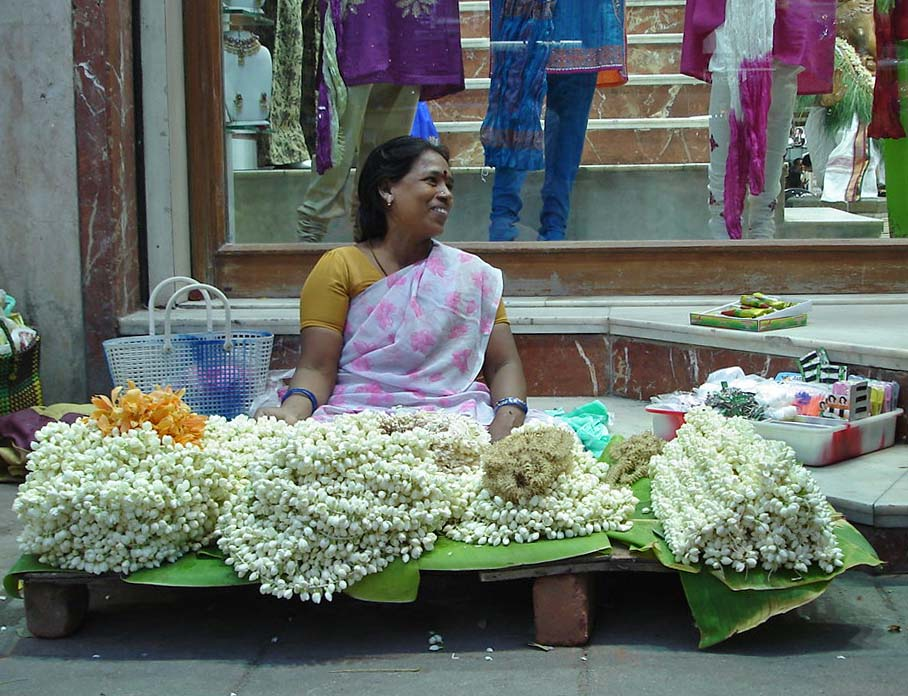
A street vendor sells jasmine garlands in Chennai, India

The flowers are used for garlands, especially at weddings and other auspicious occasions and for making garlands for worship of temples deities. Jasmine is widely cultivated for their flowers, enjoyed in the garden, as house plants, and as cut flowers. The flowers are worn by women in their hair in southern and southeast Asia. They are exported and thus highly remunerative to the farmers.

=== Scent industry ===
Jasmine of the family Oleaceae constitutes a group of plants, which are commercially grown for their fragrant flowers and essential oil production. Jasmine oil is said to blend with every floral scent and hence extensively used as an important perfumery item throughout the world. Indole is one of the constituent of perfumery importance present in buds. It is highly volatile. Fully opened, freshly collected flowers during early morning hours are used for extraction. On an average, the essential oil recovery ranges from 0.24 to 0.42% and the concrete yield is about 22 kg (49 lb) per hectare. Further on processing the concrete yields absolute to the extent of about 50% of the concrete production.

It is one of the key scents in some of the perfume in the world viz., the Chanel No. 5, created by Coco Chanel and the "Joy" perfume, created by the French designer Jean Patou. A single ounce, still known as the 'costliest perfume in the world", contains 10,600 jasmine flowers.

In scent industry the two main varieties used are the Jasminum grandiflorum and Jasminum sambac. .

=== Export promotion and development ===
Jasmine is part of floriculture or flower farming, which is a discipline of horticulture concerned with the cultivation of flowering and ornamental plants for gardens and for floristry, comprising the floral industry. The development plant breeding of new varieties is a major occupation of floriculturists. Floriculture crops include bedding plants, flowering plants, foliage plants or houseplants, cut cultivated greens, and cut flowers. As distinguished from nursery crops, floriculture crops are generally herbaceous. Bedding and garden plants consist of young flowering plants (annuals and perennials) and vegetable plants. Flowers are mainly for export and this business is growing in the world at around 6-10 per cent per annum. India’s share in the international market for these flowers is still negligible. However, Karnataka is in the limelight for floriculture right from the 18th century and is now the leader in floriculture, accounting for 75% of India's total flower production. The state has the highest area under modern cut flowers, and 40 flower growing and exporting units. The country's first and only flower auction centre is located in Karnataka. As per statistics for the year 2003–04, out of a total area of 18,182 ha (44,930 acres) under commercial flower crops, jasmine (the three varieties) accounts for 3,451 ha (about 19%) and the average yield of flowers is reported to be 6 tons/ha with a total production of 20,244 tons.

The floriculture fair is organized every year at Aalsmeer, which is Netherlands' flower district (attracts flower growers with their flowers, from all parts of the globe). Karnataka government is reported to be deputing a team of growers of Udupi Mallige, Hadagali Mallige and Mysore Mallige flower to the Netherlands to attend the international floricultural meet. The department's strategy is to create a platform at the fair where women (three from each region) would string the flowers, thereby attracting the attention of the foreign visitors'. The act of deftly stringing jasmines flowers is an art which has been mastered by women growers.

=== Jasmine absolute ===
Absolute is the solvent extracted product of Jasmine. It is rendered through the process explained by Mandy Aftel, quoted below. The solvent extracts are supplied from the Jasmine extraction units located in South India where several thousand acres of Jasmine farms exist in Karnataka and Tamil Nadu.

== Geographical Indication (GI) ==
A Geographical Indication or a GI is the protection given to a reputable product, either man-made or natural, if the applicant can conclusively prove that the unique character, reputation of the product is attributable to a specific quality attributable to only the geographical region where the product is produced and which may not be replicated to the same standard in any other region. As the French and the Scottish people would swear both these types of liquors are highly unique in their taste; the uniqueness being attributable to the soil, climate, cultivating practices of their respective geographical regions. The logic of protecting them as a GI is quite similar (but not same) to that of a trademark with the important distinction that GI protection is a community right i.e. it is given to all manufacturers/producers of a product in a certain designated area if their products meet the certifications standards laid down by a collective society. To get a GI protection reputation has to be proved before registration. GI is defined both in the TRIPS & in the Indian ‘The Geographical Indication of Goods (Registration and Protection) Act, 1999'.

The state of Karnataka, claimed the GI protection based on the special qualities of the Mallige flowers (jasmines) particular to the region – the "Mysore Mallige", the "Udupi Mallige" and "Hadagali Mallige"- as they fully met the criteria laid down under the Act. The criteria considered were the following.

- Unique quality – The unique factor is that the volatile oil (essential oil) content is comparatively lower in this variety.
- Attribution: The dry sandy soil prevailing in the region around Hadagali taluk is responsible for the particular aroma of this flower, while the dry climate (low/sparse rainfall) adds to the favourable environment for the crop.
- Reputation: The flower is in high demand in places such as Mumbai, besides the coastal region. It has an export potential as it is in demand in West Asia.

An expert committee headed by the Controller-General of Patents, Design and Trade Marks attached to the Union Ministry of Commerce and Industry, India, who also act as the Registrar of GI approved the GI patent to the three flowers, varieties of jasmine, in September 2007. An entry to the Geographical Indications Registry provides exclusive rights to the local community to cultivate the crop for 10 years. With this GI tag or patent nobody outside this specific geographical region will be allowed to sell under the same name. Besides the community ownership of the crop, the Horticulture Department offers technical assistance, brand development and market assistance to the growers of the crop registered under GI. With the GI tag the bond between Mysore city and the Mallige (jasmine) flower has now grown stronger.

“Flowers are placed on racks in a hermetically sealed container. A liquid solvent, usually hexane, is circulated over the flowers to dissolve the essential oils. This produces a solid waxy paste called a “concrete”. The concrete is then repeatedly treated with pure alcohol (ethanol) which dissolves the wax and yields the highly aromatic liquid known as an absolute. This method is also used for extracting resins and balsams and for rendering the animal essences, such as civet, musk, ambergris and castoreum”. (source: Mandy Aftel, Essence and Alchemy".

== Poems and films ==
The Jasmine flower with the name tag 'Mysore Mallige' has been extolled over the past century by poets, novelists and theatre artist of Karnataka. The Late K S Narasimhaswamy, well known as Mallige Kavi (poet), immortalized the name "Mysore Mallige". His poetry collection Mysooru Mallige (1942) is considered one of the best literary works in the Kannada language and has seen 27 reprints.

This collection of poems has inspired the movie made by T.S. Nagabharana and also a musical play by Kalagangothri "Mysooru Mallige". He has adopted popular singers P. Kalinga Rao, Mysore Ananthaswamy and C. Ashwath who have popularised poems of Narasimhaswamy both in the movies and the theatre.

== See also ==
- Jasmine
- Mysore Mallige (film)
