= The Old Swimmin' Hole =

The Old Swimmin' Hole may refer to:

- The Old Swimmin Hole - 1883 poem by James Whitcomb Riley on which the films were based
- The Old Swimmin' Hole (1921 film), an American comedy film directed by Joseph De Grasse
- The Old Swimmin' Hole (1940 film), an American drama film directed by Robert F. McGowan
