= Typhoid Sufferers =

Typhoid Sufferers or Tifusari may refer to:

- Typhoid Sufferers (poem), 1950 poem by Jure Kaštelan
- Typhoid Sufferers (film), 1963 short film by Vatroslav Mimica

== See also ==
- Typhoid
