= The Lady Clare =

The Lady Clare may refer to:

- The Lady Clare (1919 film), a 1919 British silent film.
- Lady Clare, an 1842 poem by Alfred Tennyson.
- "Lady Clara Vere de Vere", another 1842 poem by Alfred Tennyson.
