= 40th Filmfare Awards South =

Award ceremony for South Indian films

- Date: 13 October 1993
- Site: Madras, Tamil Nadu, India
- Hosted by: Priya Raman
- Produced by: Kalpateak

The 40th Filmfare Awards South Ceremony honouring the winners of the best of South Indian cinema in 1992 was held on 13 October 1993 at Kamaraj Hall, Madras.

== Awards ==
=== Main awards ===
==== Kannada cinema ====
| Best Film | Best Director |
|---|---|
| Mysore Mallige | T. S. Nagabharana - Mysore Mallige |
| Best Actor | Best Actress |
| Charuhasan- Kubi Matthu Iyala | Sudha Rani - Mysore Mallige |
Best Music Director
C. Ashwath - Mysore Mallige

==== Malayalam cinema ====
| Best Film | Best Director |
|---|---|
| Sargam | Sibi Malayil - Sadayam |
| Best Actor | Best Actress |
| Murali - Aadhaaram | Geetha - Aadhaaram |
Best Music Director
Bombay Ravi - Sargam

==== Tamil cinema ====
| Best Film | Best Director |
|---|---|
| Roja | K. Balachander -Vaaname Ellai |
| Best Actor | Best Actress |
| Kamal Haasan - Thevar Magan | Revathi -Thevar Magan |
Best Music Director
A. R. Rahman - Roja

==== Telugu cinema ====
| Best Film | Best Director |
|---|---|
| Gharana Mogudu | K. Vishwanath - Aapadbandhavudu |
| Best Actor | Best Actress |
| Chiranjeevi- Aapadbandhavudu | Revathi- Ankuram |
Best Music Director
K. V. Mahadevan- Swati Kiranam

=== Special Awards ===
Lifetime Achievement
- L. V. Prasad (Producer/Director)

== Awards Presentation ==
- Srihari Khoday (Best Film Kannada) Received Award from Parthiban
- Sibi Malayil (Best Film Malayalam) Received Award from Rehman
- Devi Varaprasad (Best Film Telugu) Received Award from Priya Raman
- Pushpa Kandasamy (Best Film Tamil) Received Award from Lavanya
- T. S. Nagabharana (Best Director Kannada) Received Award from Seetha
- Sibi Malayi (Best Director Malayalam) Received Award from Suresh Krishna
- K. Vishwanath (Best Director Telugu) Received Award from Khushbu
- K. Balachander (Best Director Tamil) Received Award from Sarika
- C. Ashwath (Best Music Director Kannada) Received Award from Seema
- Bombay Ravi (Best Music Director Malayalam) Received Award from Sridhar
- K. V. Mahadevan (Best Music Director Malayalam) Received Award from Rupini
- A. R. Rahman (Best Music Director Tamil) Received Award from Nafisa Ali
- Sudha Rani (Best Actress Kannada) Received Award from S.P. Muthuraman
- Geetha (Best Actress Malayalam) Received Award from A. Nageswara Rao
- Revathy (Best Actress Telugu) Received Award from Reena Roy
- Revathy (Best Actress Tamil) Received Award from Pehlaj Nihalani
- Charuhasan (Best Actor Kannada) Received Award from Heera
- Murali (Best Actor Malayalam) Received Award from Chunky Pandey
- Chiranjeevi (Best Actor Telugu) Received Award from Mammootty
- Kamal Haasan (Best Actor Tamil) Received Award from Dimple Kapadia
- Sai Prasad Receives L. V. Prasad Award (Lifetime Achievement Award) from Vyjayantimala
