= Zlatko Crnković (actor) =

Croatian actor (1936–2012)

- Born: 27 May 1936; Kastav, Kingdom of Yugoslavia
- Died: 14 February 2012 (aged 75); Zagreb, Croatia
- Occupation: Actor
- Years active: 1957–2005

Zlatko Crnković (27 May 1936 – 14 February 2012) was a Croatian actor.

He received the Vladimir Nazor Award for lifetime achievement in theatre in 2008.

He died after a cardiac arrest on 14 February 2012 aged 76.

== Filmography ==
=== Television roles ===
- Bitange i princeze as judge (2005)
- Olujne tišine as Aleksandar pl. Radočaj (1997)
- Putovanje u Vučjak as Šipušić (1986)
- Nikola Tesla as Ben Johnson (1977)
- U registraturi as župnik (1974)
- Kuda idu divlje svinje as Veno (1971)

=== Movie roles ===
- Tu as Josip (2003)
- Duga ponoć (2003)
- Kuća duhova as Illustrissimus (1998)
- Čudnovate zgode šegrta Hlapića as storyteller (1997)
- Proljeće Ivana B. (1995)
- Gospa as Zoran Ranković (1994)
- Kamenita vrata (1992)
- Luka (1992)
- Vila Orhideja as uncle (1988)
- Olujna noć (1987)
- Nitko se neće smijati as Hofman (1985)
- Horvatov izbor (1985)
- Heda Gabler (1985)
- Pod starim krovovima (1984)
- Ifigenija u Aulidi (1983)
- Ustrijelite Kastora (1982)
- Obiteljski album (1981)
- Poglavlje iz života Augusta Šenoe (1981)
- Obustava u strojnoj (1980)
- Dekreti (1980)
- Ljubica (1979)
- Istarska rapsodija (1978)
- Car se zabavlja (1975)
- Timon (1973)
- Okreni leđa vjetru (1972)
- Kainov znak (1970)
- Ožiljak (1969)
- Mirotvorci (1966)
- Mokra koža (1966)
- Tifusari (narration, 1963)
- Nevesinjska puška (1963)
- Opasni put as Willy (1963)
- Martin u oblacima as inspector (1961)
- Siva bilježnica (1961)
- Pustolov pred vratima (1961)
- Kota 905 (1960)
- Vlak bez voznog reda (1959)
- Naši se putovi razilaze (1957)
