= Mysore Mallige (film) =

Mysoora Mallige
- Directed by: T. S. Nagabharana
- Written by: T. S. Nagabharana; C. Ashwath; Basavaraj
- Produced by: Srihari Khoday
- Starring: Girish Karnad; Sudharani; H. G. Dattatreya; Anand Subramanian
- Cinematography: B. C. Gowrishankar
- Edited by: Suresh Urs
- Music by: C. Ashwath
- Production company: Yajaman Enterprises
- Release date: 1992
- Running time: 146 minutes
- Country: India
- Language: Kannada

Mysoora Mallige (transl. Jasmine of Mysuru) is a 1992 Indian Kannada-language drama film directed and co-written by T. S. Nagabharana and produced by Srihari Khoday. The story is based on a 1942 work of the same title by the poet K. S. Narasimhaswamy. The film was an attempt to create a story based on the poetry.

The film's cast consisted mainly of actors from a theatrical background including Girish Karnad, Sudharani, Anand, Sundar Raj and H. G. Dattatreya.

The film was well received upon release. It went on to win National Film Award for Best Feature Film in Kannada and the lyrical works by Narasimha Swamy fetched him the National Film Award for Best Lyrics. The film also received multiple Karnataka State Film Awards including Best Film, Best Actress and other technical categories.

On the occasion of 101st birth anniversary of K. S. Narasimha Swamy, a leading Kannada daily reported that this movie was the inspiration for the 1994 Hindi movie 1942: A Love Story.

== Plot ==
Mysoora Mallige is woven from the lyrical poems of K. S. Narasimha Swamy, one of the modern Kannada poets inspired to sing by the love of his land.

Padma is a village girl who is in love with the poet Manju, a fervent patriot. Her father is a village accountant, an instrument of the village's feudal structure, and he opposes Manju's activities. He tries to arrange his daughter's marriage to a man of his own views, but Padma and Manju are united, with the help of Chennaiah, a bangle seller.

In an attempt to save Chennaiah, who becomes involved with nationalists, Manju is wounded and given up for lost. The poet's works are later published by his wife (Padma). Ultimately in the book release function Padma and Manju both united happily.

== Cast ==
- Girish Karnad as Padma's father
- Sudharani as Padma
- Anand as Manju
- Sundar Raj
- H. G. Dattatreya
- Shankar Rao
- Kasaragodu Chinna
- Kishori Ballal
- Pankaja
- Sripathi Ballal
- Shimoga Venkatesh

== Production ==
Mysore Mallige was first of its kind film in Kannada where a film is adapted from a poetry collection by K. S. Narasimha Swamy. Nagabharana, along with C Ashwath, H S Venkateshmurthy, M N Vyasa Rao, Narahalli Balasubramanya and B R Lakshman Rao, worked on the film’s script for about three years, developing the characters derived from the poems.

== Soundtrack ==
The music of the film was composed by C. Ashwath. All the 9 songs composed for this film have been from the literary work collection of poet K. S. Narasimha Swamy.

Track listing
No.	Title	Lyrics	Singer(s)	Length
1.	"Hakkiya Haadige"	K. S. Narasimha Swamy	S. Janaki, S. P. Balasubrahmanyam, B. R. Chaya
2.	"Katthale Thumbida"	K. S. Narasimha Swamy	S. P. Balasubrahmanyam
3.	"Ondiralu Kanasali"	K. S. Narasimha Swamy	S. P. Balasubrahmanyam, S. Janaki
4.	"Deepavu Ninnade"	K. S. Narasimha Swamy	S. Janaki
5.	"Sirigereya Neeralli"	K. S. Narasimha Swamy	S. P. Balasubrahmanyam
6.	"Ninna Premada Pariya"	K. S. Narasimha Swamy	S. P. Balasubrahmanyam
7.	"Balegara Chennayya"	K. S. Narasimha Swamy	S. P. Balasubrahmanyam
8.	"Aakashakke"	K. S. Narasimha Swamy	S. P. Balasubrahmanyam
9.	"Rayaru Bandaru"	K. S. Narasimha Swamy	Rathnamala Prakash

== Awards ==
The film has won the following awards since its release.

39th National Film Awards

- National Film Award for Best Feature Film in Kannada
- Silver Lotus Award – Best Lyricist — K. S. Narasimhaswamy

1991–92 Karnataka State Film Awards

- Second Best Film
- Best Actress — Sudharani
- Best Cinematographer — B. C. Gowrishankar
- Best Sound Recording — Aravinda Kiggal and K. S. Krishnamurthy
- Best Editor — Suresh Urs

40th Filmfare Awards South

- Best Film – Kannada
- Best Director – Kannada — T. S. Nagabharana
- Best Actress – Kannada — Sudharani
- Best Music Director – Kannada — C. Ashwath

This film screened at IFFI 1992 Panorama section.
