= Kuchh Na Kaho =

Song by R. D. Burman (composer) Kumar Sanu (singer)

from the album 1942: A Love Story
- Released: 1994
- Recorded: 1994
- Genre: Romantic Song
- Label: His Master's Voice
- Songwriter(s): R. D. Burman (music); Javed Akhtar (lyrics)

"Kuchh Na Kaho" is a romantic Hindi song from the film 1942: A Love Story. The song was composed by R. D. Burman with lyrics by Javed Akhtar and vocals by Kumar Sanu. It was the swan song of R. D. Burman, released three months after his death (January 1994). It is composed in the Dadra taal. Ronu Majumdar played the flute. Along with Ek Ladki Ko Dekha from the same movie, the song represented Kumar Sanu's peak as a singer. He also said on interview, this song "kuch na kaho" is used as treatment for cerebral palsy patients.

The song had another version, recorded by Lata Mangeshkar after RD Burman's death. This sad version was not well received by some critics. Noted film critic Raju Bharatan, who also wrote a biography of Lata Mangeshkar, remarked "we tuneful watchers agonized at the way Lata played such vocal havoc with Kuchh na kaho". Kavita Krishnamurthy had earlier recorded the sad version of the song on 15 July 1993, but her rendition was not released.
