= Babies switched at birth =

Babies who are erroneously switched at birth

Babies are occasionally switched at birth or soon thereafter, leading to the babies being unknowingly raised by parents who are not their biological parents. The occurrence has historically rarely been discovered in real life, but since the availability of genealogical testing of DNA has been discovered more frequently, and likely went undiscovered more often in the past. The phenomenon has been common as a plot device in fiction since the 18th century. The exchange may be accidental, or (particularly in fiction) purposeful. The babies may be referred to as changelings.

== Real-world cases ==
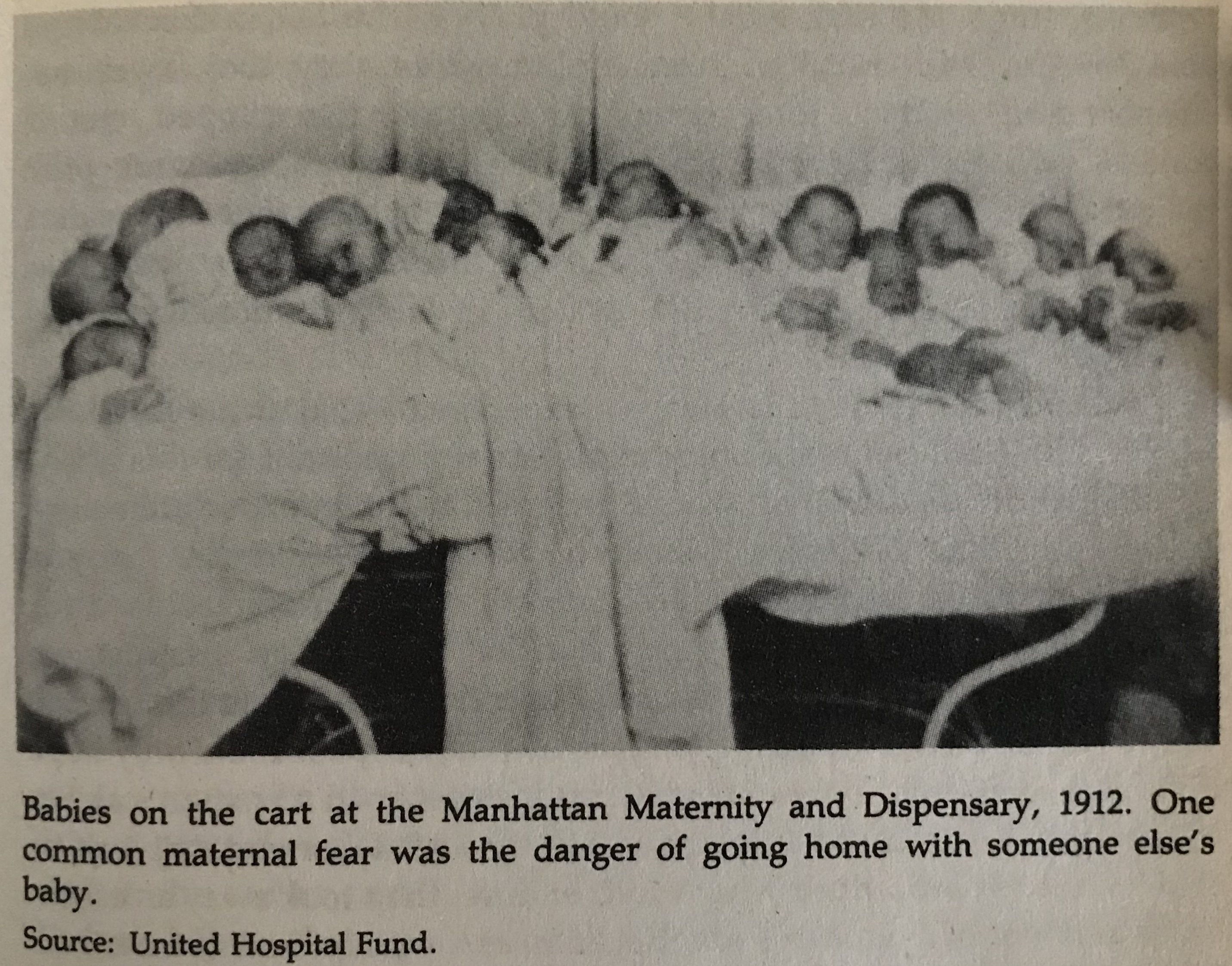
Babies on a cart at Manhattan Maternity and Dispensary in 1912

In real life, such a switch occurs rarely. Since many cases of babies switched at birth are likely undocumented or unknown, the following is presumably not an exhaustive list. The below is ordered by birth year, if known.

=== 20th century ===
- In 1913, a baby subsequently named Jim Collins was born to Sam and Ida Benson and a baby subsequently named Phillip Benson was born to John Josef Collins and his wife. They were switched at Fordham Hospital in New York City in the early days of hospital births.
- In 1931, at the Leiden University Medical Center, female babies Agnes van Vegten and Lenie van Duyn were switched. Suspicions did not arise until two decades later, when the girls met at a wedding and wondered about their mutual likeness to each other's families.
- In 1941, in a Michigan hospital, Tom Johnson and Herbert Benjamin Reibman were accidentally switched. The switch was discovered in 2019 after genetic testing.
- In 1942, in a West Virginia hospital, John William Carr III and Jackie Lee Spencer were accidentally switched. The switch was discovered after DNA testing. In 2020, the men filed a lawsuit over the switch.
- In 1942, in a Pennsylvania hospital, Sandra Baronick Pyne and Sandra Monaco Smith were accidentally switched. The switch was discovered in 2018 after genetic testing.
- In 1942, at Bureå hospital in northern Sweden, two boys were accidentally switched, and then switched back after a legal process in 1945 (the case is known as Bureåfallet in Swedish). This is described in the novel Kapten Nemos bibliotek (1991) by Per Olov Enquist, who was a cousin of one of the boys.
- In 1945, Denice Juneski and Linda Jourdeans were accidentally switched in a St. Paul Minnesota hospital. The switch was discovered in 2018 after genetic testing.
- In 1951, at a hospital in Prairie du Chien, Wisconsin, the babies of Mary Miller and Kay McDonald were accidentally switched. Mary Miller immediately suspected that a switch had occurred, as the baby she received weighed a full two pounds less than at the hospital. Mary Miller knew Kay McDonald, and assumed that it was their baby she had taken home. However, discouragement from her husband kept Mary Miller from actively pursuing her suspicion for 43 years, when she revealed to the now grown girls, Sue McDonald and Martha Miller, what she suspected of their births. Genetic tests later confirmed that a switch did in fact occur. The story was featured on an episode of the radio show This American Life.
- In 1953, at Pioneer Memorial Hospital in Heppner, Oregon, two babies were switched. In May 2009, the women discovered they were switched. DeeAnn Angell of Fossil and Kay Rene Reed of Condon learned about the mistake from an 86-year-old woman who was a former neighbor. The former neighbor said that one of the girls' mothers, Marjorie Angell, insisted back in 1953 that she had been given the wrong baby after nurses returned from bathing them. But her concerns were ignored. With both sets of parents dead, the Reed and Angell siblings compared notes and family stories, learning that rumors of a mix-up had been around for years. Kay Rene Reed decided to get their DNA tested, and that confirmed the mistake. They both say they just have to move forward with their lives now, and they celebrated their latest birthday together.
- In October 1954 a blood test revealed that babies, John Bowers and Kenneth Read has been accidentally swapped at birth in Forest Gate Hospital, East London, England. Initially the mothers, Vera Bowers and Sheila Read agreed to keep the babies given to them, but after a few days, reconsidered and swapped their children for a twenty-four hour trial period. Both mothers then agreed to take their birth babies, the children swapping names in the process. The two couples involved initially planned to stay in contact but gradually drifted apart before Sheila divorced and moved with her son to Cumbria in the north of England. The mothers and their sons were reunited thirty years later.
- In March 1953, at San-Ikukai Hospital in Tokyo's Sumida Ward, hospital staff mistook a baby boy for another baby boy born 13 minutes later. This story was referred to as the tale of the Japanese "prince and pauper." Sixty years later, a 60-year-old Japanese truck driver discovered he was switched at birth after being born to a rich family. The man was raised by a single mother in a 100-square-foot apartment. The boy who was raised in his place by the rich family became the president of a real estate company.
- In the mid 1950s, Richard Beauvais and Eddy Ambrose were born hours apart in a small, municipally-run rural hospital in Arborg, Manitoba, and then sent home with the wrong parents. In 2021, members of their family did DNA testing and discovered the switch. Their story was featured in The New York Times in 2023.
- In 2001, it was reported that a 35-year-old woman from the Canary Islands had discovered that she was one of a set of identical twins and that she had been accidentally switched at birth with another girl. She grew up as an only child, until a friend of her twin mistook her for being that twin. But the person was shocked by the striking similarity in appearance and summoned them together. They took a DNA test, which proved they were identical twins. The twin who had grown up thinking that another girl was her twin said that the girl she thought was her twin looked nothing like her. Since the women were born in a state hospital, they sued the government for damages.
- In 1969, Mary Ann Saenz High and Cynthia Rector were accidentally switched at a Texas hospital. The switch was discovered by DNA testing in 2018. A lawsuit was later filed by the women.
- In 1992, it was discovered that Canadians Brent Tremblay and Marcus Holmes had been switched at birth 21 years earlier. The error was discovered when Brent and his identical twin George Holmes met each other at Carleton University in Ottawa. The Children's Aid Society of Ontario later settled with the families involved.
- In 1975, at least two known cases occurred in Norway House, Manitoba of babies being switched at birth at the Norway House Hospital: Luke Monias and Norman Barkman, and Leon Swanson and David Tait Jr. Both pairs of boys were from the same small communities, and had been lifelong friends of their switch-mates before learning of the switches only in the mid-2010s.
- In 1978, Kimberly Mays and Arlena Twigg were switched at birth as a result of a medical error in a hospital in Wauchula, Florida; the events surrounding their case were subsequently dramatized as the TV movie Switched at Birth.
- The Mixed-Up Brothers of Bogotá refers to two sets of identical twins that got separated at birth in 1988 and were raised as fraternal twins. The twins reunited in 2015.
- The sons of two South African women, Margaret Clinton-Parker and Sandra Dawkins, were accidentally switched at birth in 1989; the women sued in the High Court of South Africa in Johannesburg in 1995, demanding damages of ZAR120,000 each from the government of the province of Gauteng for the error. Later that year, they were awarded damages to cover medical expenses and the future projected costs of visiting their biological children. Each family kept the child they had been living and raised them as their own even after learning of the switch. That was until one of the boys, Robin, at the age of 15, decided to leave Sandy Dawkins to go and live with his biological mother Margaret Clinton-Parker. The boys spent the remainder of their childhood living as brothers.
- In 1998, it was discovered that Callie Johnson and Rebecca Chittum had been switched at birth in 1995 in Charlottesville, Virginia. The switch was discovered when a DNA test of Callie Johnson to determine paternity for child support found that she was not biologically related to either her purported father, Carlton Conley, or her purported mother, Paula Johnson. In a tragic coincidence, Callie's biological parents Kevin Chittum and Whitney Rogers died in a car accident the day after Paula Johnson learned of the results of the DNA test. Five others also died in the car accident, but Rebecca Chittum, Johnson's three-year-old biological daughter whom the deceased couple had been raising as their child, was at home with her supposed grandparents at the time of the accident. Over the next decade, Paula Johnson repeatedly grappled with Rebecca's purported grandparents for custody and visitation rights, until a judge determined that the two girls were old enough to express their own wishes with regard to seeing their biological relatives. In 2001, Carlton Conley married the sister of his biological daughter Rebecca's deceased adoptive father Kevin Chittum. Rebecca Chittum lived with the couple as of 2008 but had limited contact with her biological mother, while Callie lived with Paula Johnson and occasionally visited her biological relatives.
- On January 1, 1998, two newborn girls were switched at the hospital of Mazara del Vallo, Italy. Three years later, leaving kinderschool, a teacher mistakenly handed one of the girls to her birth mother, as the woman bore an incredible likeness to the girl. After this episode, many doubts arose and DNA tests established unequivocally that there had been a cradle swapping. The tribunal decided to give back the girls to their birth parents, but the families remained friends and decided to create an "extended family" with "two mothers, two fathers and eight grandparents". The story inspired the film Il 7 e l'8 (The 7 and the 8), and the TV-movie Sorelle per sempre (Sisters Forever).

=== 21st century ===
- On December 9, 2006, two newborn girls were switched in a hospital in the Czech town of Třebíč. The families did not find out until September 2007, when a couple of friends of one of the fathers made fun of him for not being the biological father of the baby. DNA tests proved that the girl was indeed switched. After days of investigation, the other family was found. The babies were gradually introduced to their biological parents and returned to their birth homes.
- On October 10, 2011, it was discovered that two Russian newborn girls were switched 12 years beforehand in a town in the Ural Mountains. The truth emerged after the ex-husband of one of the mothers refused to pay alimony for the child on the basis that she looked nothing like him. DNA tests proved that the child was neither's biological daughter. The other family was discovered across town with the biological daughter. The children stayed with their adoptive parents, and both families are demanding 5 million rubles in damage.
- On March 11, 2015, two newborn boys were switched in a hospital in the Indian state of Assam. The mother of one of the children became suspicious after a week, at which point she contacted the hospital. The hospital initially blamed the mother's concerns on her mental health issues. The child's father, through a right to information request, found the couple with whom their child was switched, and a DNA test was carried out. Each set of parents wanted to keep the child they took home from the hospital.
- Moses Cushworth, the son of UK citizen Rich Cushworth and his Salvadoran wife Mercedes "Mercy" Casanalles, was switched with another baby at a Salvadoran hospital in May 2015. Getting Moses out of El Salvador became a nine-month process requiring the help of UK Ambassador Bernhard Garside in obtaining a passport for the boy, due to the problems with the birth certificate.
- In 2021, a baby switching instance occurred in the province of Rizal, Philippines. The couple Aprhil and Marvin Sifiata took home the wrong baby of Margareth Traballo and Kim Jasper Mulleno, and vice versa. Originally, the DNA tests were negative. Several weeks later, with the help of newsmagazine program Kapuso Mo, Jessica Soho, the DNA tests became positive and both babies are with their respective biological parents.
- In 2022, a baby switching instance occurred in the Union territory of Jammu Kashmir, India. In June 2025, an inquiry was initiated at SMGS Hospital in Jammu following allegations that two female infants born in September 2022 had been inadvertently exchanged at birth. The issue came to light after both families conducted DNA tests, which indicated that the children had been switched.

== Anti-switch techniques ==
Some hospitals take fingerprints, foot prints, or palm prints of newborns to prevent babies from being mixed up. Nurses also double check with the mother, checking the identity of that person as well, in order to prevent errors. Many hospitals also have policies in which a medical record number is assigned to an infant at birth, and bands with this number as well as the last name of the mother of the infant, the sex of the infant, and the date and time of birth are placed on the infant and the mother immediately after parturition before the mother and child are separated. A band may also be placed on the father (or other person chosen by the mother) at the time of birth.

== As a literary plot device ==
The plot device of babies who are switched at birth, or in their cradles, has been a common one in fiction since the 18th century. It is one of the several identifiable characteristics of melodrama that are plot devices dealing with situations that are highly improbable in real life.

The use of this common theme has continued ever since. The device was used a number of times by W. S. Gilbert, including in the Gilbert and Sullivan comic operas H.M.S. Pinafore and The Gondoliers. In both cases, well-born babies were switched with commoners. In the original version of the French fairy tale Beauty and the Beast (1740) by Gabrielle-Suzanne de Villeneuve, Beauty is a princess whose fairy aunt switched her at birth with a merchant's dead daughter to protect her from an evil fairy who had attempted to kill her and had also turned the Prince into a Beast. In Alfred, Lord Tennyson's poem Lady Clare, the eponymous noblewoman learns that her old nurse, Alice, is her birth mother, who switched her at birth with the real Lady Clare who had died infancy. Mark Twain later used this plot device in The Tragedy of Pudd'nhead Wilson (1893), where two babies, one white and one black, are switched at birth, resulting in both passing for races that they are not. It is one of the themes that television films regularly exploited in the 1970s and 1980s.

In the 1944 English film Don't Take It To Heart, a ghost haunting the castle of an Irish nobleman is revealed to be the biological son of a commoner who was switched with the 12th Earl's real son, a fact he learned only on the night of his death, when his wife had him walled up in the crypt.

In the 1984 film Once Upon a Time in America, a criminal gang switches the newborn boy of a police chief to extort him into not breaking a labor strike. While they offer to reveal who the real chief's son is, they have actually lost the information.

In the 1990 novel Good Omens, the baby Antichrist is supposed to be switched with the son of the American ambassador to Britain, but due to a mix-up with a third baby, he actually grows up with ordinary middle-class parents in a small village, free of the interference of Heaven and Hell.

Possibly the most complex storyline involving the switched-at-birth plot device ran simultaneously on All My Children and One Life to Live, from March 2004 to February 2005. Involved were All My Children's Bianca Montgomery and Babe Chandler, and One Life to Live's Kelly Cramer Buchanan, as well as many other characters.

In the manga/anime Kakkou no Iinazuke, Nagi Umino, whose biological parents are hotel tycoons; and Erika Amano, whose biological parents are owners of a local diner, are actually accidentally switched at birth. When they become older, their parents agree to have the two engaged.

In an Indian film named Ala Vaikunthapurramuloo, an employee switches his son Raj with his rich employer's son Bantu at birth. Knowing this after 25 years, the grownup Bantu joins the company without revealing his real identity to his biological parents to solve their problems and ends up taking the ownership of the company.

== See also ==
- Kaspar Hauser, whom some hypothesize to have been the real child of Karl, Grand Duke of Baden, switched at birth with a dead child
- Changeling, the offspring of a magical creature swapped with a human child and left in its place
