= C. Ashwath =

Indian composer and singer (1939-2009)

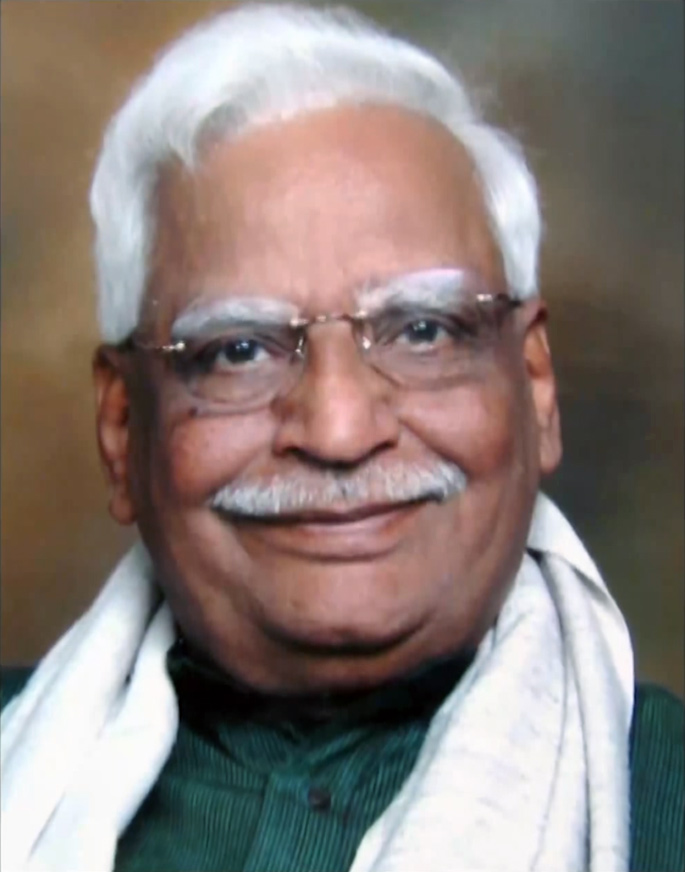
- C. Ashwath

Background information
- Born: Ashwatha Narayana; 29 December 1939
- Origin: Channarayapatna
- Died: 29 December 2009 (aged 70) Bengaluru
- Genres: Bhavageete, Janapada Geete (Traditional Indian light and folk music)
- Occupations: lyricist, Singer, composer
- Years active: 1969–2009

Channarayapatna Ashwath (Kannada: ಸಿ. ಅಶ್ವತ್ಥ್, lit. 'C. Ashwath'; 29 December 1939 – 29 December 2009) was an Indian music composer and exponent of Bhavageete ("expressive poetry") in the Kannada language. He was also a singer, and sang many of his own compositions. He was credited with singing Bhavageete songs in a manner that made them accessible to the common man.

== Early life and education ==
He was born on 29 December 1939, in Channarayapatna near Devanahalli. He was born into a family rich in traditional and cultural influences. He grew up in the Chamarajpete area of Bangalore. After completing his higher education in Acharaya Pathashala School of NR Colony, he graduated in Science from National College, Basavanagudi and later worked in Indian Telephone Industries for 27 years before retiring as an Executive Engineer in 1992. He started his musical career as a disciple of Devagiri Shankara Joshi in Hindustani music.

== Movies ==
The first film he independently scored music was Kakana Kote. Later followed Chinnari Mutha, Santha Shishunala Sharief, Mysoora Mallige, Kotreshi Kanasu, Nagamandala and few other films in Kannada.

Some of his notable compositions include the composition of music for Mysooru Mallige – a classic work of noted poet K.S. Narasimhaswamy and his compositions of Kannada saint Santa Shishunala Sharifa's works.

L. Vaidyanathan met C. Ashwath during the recording of the film Kakana Kote in 1976. This meeting led them on to a strong relationship of almost three decades. L. Vaidyanathan provided the orchestra for many of Ashwath's compositions, but it was with the film Yene Barali Preeti Irali that the Ashwath-Vaidi duo became collaborators of great music.

- Anupama (Olume Poojegende, Bartaale Bartaale, etc.)
- Aalemane (Nammoora Mandaara Hoove)
- Kaanchana Mruga (ee savidina endendu)
- Baadada Hoo (Hoova Nodu Aaaha Entha)
- Bhoolokadalli Yamaraaja (Endoo kaanada belaka kande)
- Narada Vijaya (Idu entha lokavayya)

== Discography ==
=== Films ===
Year	Film title	Notes
1977	Kakana Kote	Arrangement by L. Vaidyanathan
1977	Anuroopa	Guest composer along with Rajeev Taranath
1978	Lakshmi	Unreleased film
1978	Spandana	Arrangement by L. Vaidyanathan; Won Karnataka State Film Award for Best Music Director
1979	Bhoolokadalli Yamaraja	
1979	Doddamane Estate	
1979	Ene Barali Preethi Irali	Credited as "Ashwath - Vaidi"
1980	Anurakthe	Credited as "Ashwath - Vaidi"
1980	Narada Vijaya	Credited as "Ashwath - Vaidi"
1981	Aalemane	Credited as "Ashwath - Vaidi"
1981	Anupama	Credited as "Ashwath - Vaidi"
1981	Kanchana Mruga	Credited as "Ashwath - Vaidi"
1982	Baadada Hoo	Credited as "Ashwath - Vaidi"
1983	Simhasana	Credited as "Ashwath - Vaidi"
1986	Shanka Naada	Arrangement by Guna Singh
1988	Aasphota	
1990	Santha Shishunala Sharifa	
1991	Mysore Mallige	Won Filmfare Award for Best Music Director – Kannada
1993	Chinnari Mutha	Won Karnataka State Film Award for Best Music Director
1994	Kotreshi Kanasu	
1997	Nagamandala	
1998	Mayamruga	Titletrack of Kannada language teleserial directed by T. N. Seetharam
2001	Mathadana	
2003	Singaaravva	
2006	Desi	
2009	Hongirana	

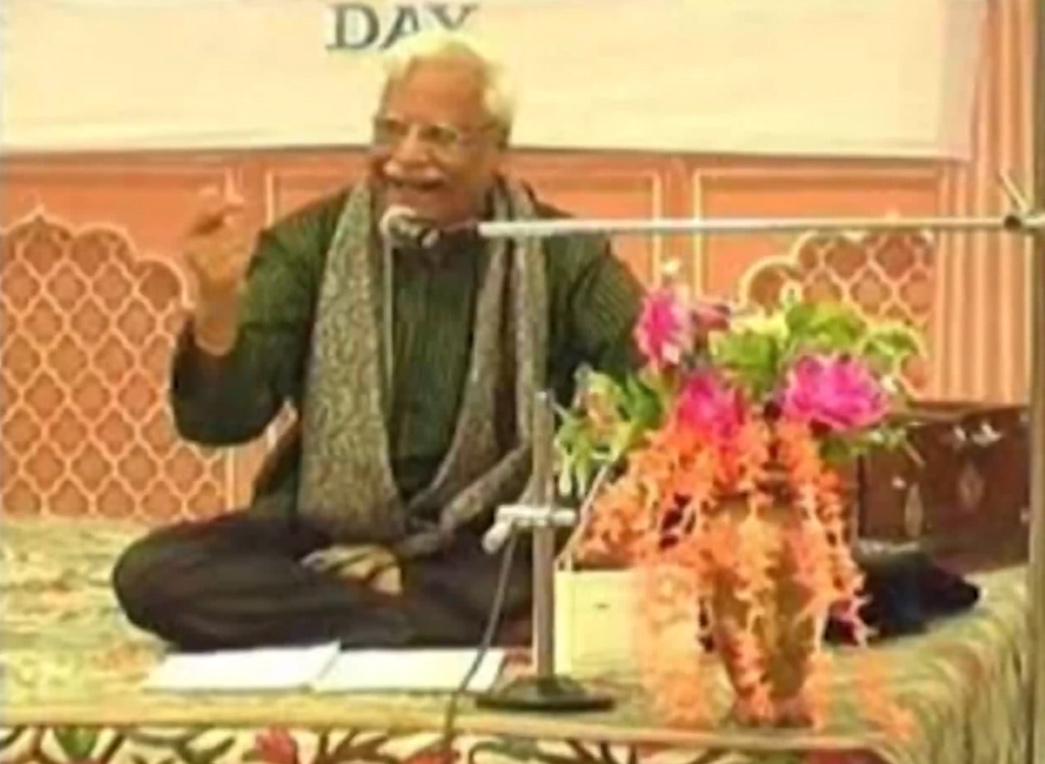
C. Ashwath singing on stage

== Style ==
A pioneer of Kannada "Sugama Sangeetha" (light music), he had over 75 albums to his credit.

C. Ashwath is a household name in Karnataka. He is, perhaps the only music director in Karnataka, to have carved a niche of his own in all three fields that demand music as an element of expression: Theatre, Sugama Sangeetha and movies.

Ashwath has also brought out an album titled "Nesara Noodu" which consists of 21 drama songs of his direction.

In the 1990s, Rajkumar had sung Kuvempu's 'Elladaroo Iru Entadaroo Iru' under the music direction of C.Ashwath, which became very popular.

== Performance ==
The Kannadave Sathya live concert, which was held in Palace Grounds, Bengaluru on 23 April 2005, headed by Ashwath, was the great success which witnessed around a lakh audience for the show. This was the first time a Kannada Musical event was taken place here, while many western and other Indian language programs taken place in the past.

== Death ==
He died on 29 December 2009 on his 70th birthday, following complications from renal and liver failure. His friends and well wishers had planned to celebrate his birthday in a special way, and Swamiji of Suttur Mutt and Virendra Hegde were to facilitate him, followed by singing his popular songs.

== Awards ==
- 1986: Rajyotsava Award by Government of Karnataka
- 2003: Kavyaganga Award by Attimabbe Foundation
