= The Old Swimmin' Hole (1921 film) =

1921 film

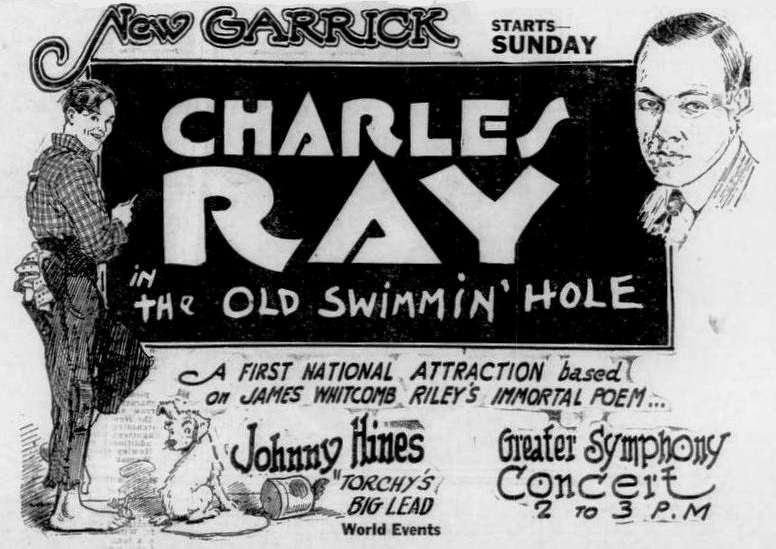
- Advertisement for the film
- Directed by: Joe De Grasse
- Written by: Bernard McConville
- Based on: The Old Swimmin' Hole by James Whitcomb Riley
- Produced by: Charles Ray; Arthur S. Kane
- Starring: Charles Ray; Laura La Plante
- Cinematography: George Rizard
- Edited by: Harry L. Decker
- Production company: First National Pictures
- Distributed by: First National Pictures
- Release date: February 27, 1921 (U.S.)
- Running time: 60 minutes
- Country: United States
- Language: Silent (English intertitles)

The Old Swimmin' Hole (1921)

The Old Swimmin' Hole is a 1921 American silent comedy film directed by Joe De Grasse based on the poem The Old Swimmin' Hole by James Whitcomb Riley. A reviewer for Exhibitors Herald summarized, "The theme of the picture is a light one—just the pleasant little love story of a country schoolboy and girl in the era of the youth of Tom Sawyer."

The film's lack of intertitles has been described as innovative. "This marks an advance in film making," the same reviewer claimed. "Their absence is not realized for some time after the feature has proceeded, a certain indication that it has been skillfully welded together without them and their place supplied by good acting."

== Plot ==
Ezra Hull is a country kid who would rather fish than go swimming with the gang. Shy wallflower Esther has a crush on him, but Ezra is completely bewitched by the more glamorous Myrtle. Trying to impress his friends, Ezra steals apples from an orchard. He stuffs a bunch of them underneath his shirt but during his flight from the orchard, he runs into the local pastor, then narrowly escapes the owner of the orchard. Ezra heads over to Myrtle’s house, where he performs every trick he knows – dancing, acrobatics, balancing on the fence of her home – to try to get her attention. She pretends to be interested, then turns him away.

The next morning, Ezra tries to get out of going to school by pretending to be sick. When his mother produces the dreaded bottle of medicine, Ezra suddenly feels much better. In class, Ezra spends more time passing notes to Myrtle than he does reading his lessons. He passes her a note asking her to be his sweetheart; she replies with a firm “no,” although she continues to play the coquette to get candy hearts from him. At recess, Ezra once again tries to dazzle Myrtle with his physical prowess, only to find Myrtle is more interested in Skinny, the leader of the boys.

Ezra makes a trade with one of the other kids and receives a white mouse, which he tries to hide under his shirt when the bell rings, calling the students back inside. In class, Ezra is ordered to perform a poem for the deportation lesson, and he stumbles with the words. Esther secretly tries to coach him. The mouse escapes from Ezra’s shirt and Ezra’s dog, who has been hanging around the schoolroom door, bursts inside to chase the mouse, creating chaos in the classroom. Skinny announces it was Ezra’s dog who disrupted the class, and the infuriated professor gives Ezra a note to take to his mother, saying he cannot return to school without a note from her. Ezra's parents order him to take his baby brother out in the stroller.

During the stroll, Ezra crosses paths with Skinny. Boiling mad over Skinny’s betrayal in the classroom and his flirting with Myrtle, Ezra challenges him to a fight. Despite lots of tough talk and menacing posturing, the boys never manage to actually hit each other, although Ezra notes in his diary that he “just licked Skinny.” Skinny joins the gang at the old swimming hole while Ezra goes to the market on an errand to buy flour for his mother. While there, he “accidentally” knocks a watermelon off the rack and hides it in baby’s stroller. Ezra rushes to the swimming hole to show off the purloined prize, but he slips and the melon splits open. A big mud fight breaks out and Ezra enthusiastically joins in.

During the battle, the bag of flour gets destroyed and the baby is doused in mud. Ezra’s mother, irritated by his tardiness, shows up at the swimming hole with a switch in hand. Desperate to avoid her wrath, Ezra dives under the water and the boys cover for him, telling his mother Ezra is not there. But when Ezra emerges from the pool, the boys have playfully stolen his clothes, forcing him to cover himself with the baby’s blanket as he takes the baby back home. That night, the boys meet up in their secret “pirate cave” hideaway; meanwhile, Ezra is being roundly scolded by his father, who is so upset he doesn’t notice he has left his pipe on a table in Ezra’s bedroom.

Two of the boys call for Ezra outside his window and toss his clothes back to him. Ezra quickly dresses, ties the sheets of his bed into a makeshift rope and gets ready to make his escape. Just as he is about to leave, Ezra notices his father’s pipe and stuffs it in his pocket. In the secret hideout, Ezra finds the boys smoking cornsilk. Ezra scoffs and lights his father’s pipe instead, puffing away with confidence and wowing the boys with his smoking skills. After a while, the tobacco begins to overwhelm Ezra and he excuses himself to go home, handing off the pipe to Skinny. A bit of fresh air refreshes Ezra, who walks home feeling quite proud of himself for having successfully smoked the pipe.

The next day brings a long-awaited picnic, and Ezra dresses up in his best clothes, sneaks out of the house and follows his friends to the creek. Once again, Ezra tries to win over the fickle Myrtle by taking her out in his skiff, which he has christened “Myrtl.” Jealous Skinny shows up and challenges Ezra to another fight, which never gets started because Ezra slips on the slippery bank and falls in the creek. Myrtle jeers and runs off with Skinny. Soaked and sore, Ezra writes in his diary that he is through with “wimmin,” but it seems like he may change his mind when a sympathetic Esther shows up with her picnic basket and shares her lunch with him.

== Cast ==
- Charles Ray as Ezra Hull
- Laura La Plante as Myrtle
- James Gordon as Mr. Hull
- Blanche Rose as Mrs. Hull
- Marjorie Prevost as Esther
- Lincoln Stedman as Skinny
- Lon Poff as Professor Payne
