= Typhoid Sufferers (film) =

1963 Yugoslav animated short film

- Directed by: Vatroslav Mimica
- Screenplay by: Vatroslav Mimica
- Based on: Typhoid Sufferers by Jure Kaštelan
- Starring: Zlatko Crnković (narration)
- Cinematography: Aleksandar Marks
- Music by: Branko Sakač
- Animation by: Vladimir Jutriša
- Production company: Zagreb Film
- Release date: 1963
- Running time: 13 minutes
- Country: Yugoslavia
- Language: Serbo-Croatian

Typhoid Sufferers (Serbo-Croatian: Tifusari) is a 1963 Yugoslav experimental animated short directed by Vatroslav Mimica based on Jure Kaštelan's poem of the same title.

== Content ==
The film is an animation of woodcut-style drawings that depict hallucinations of typhoid-affected partisans marching through snow-covered wastelands. The animation is followed by Zlatko Crnković's narration of Jure Kaštelan's poem.

== Credits ==
Six stills from the film

- Vatroslav Mimica: director, screenplay writer
- Jure Kaštelan: writer (poem)
- Zlatko Crnković: narrator
- Aleksandar Marks: cinematography
- Branko Sakač: composer
- Vladimir Jutriša: animator

== See also ==
- Typhoid Sufferers (poem)
