= Typhoid Sufferers (poem) =

1950 poem by Jure Kaštelan

- by Jure Kaštelan
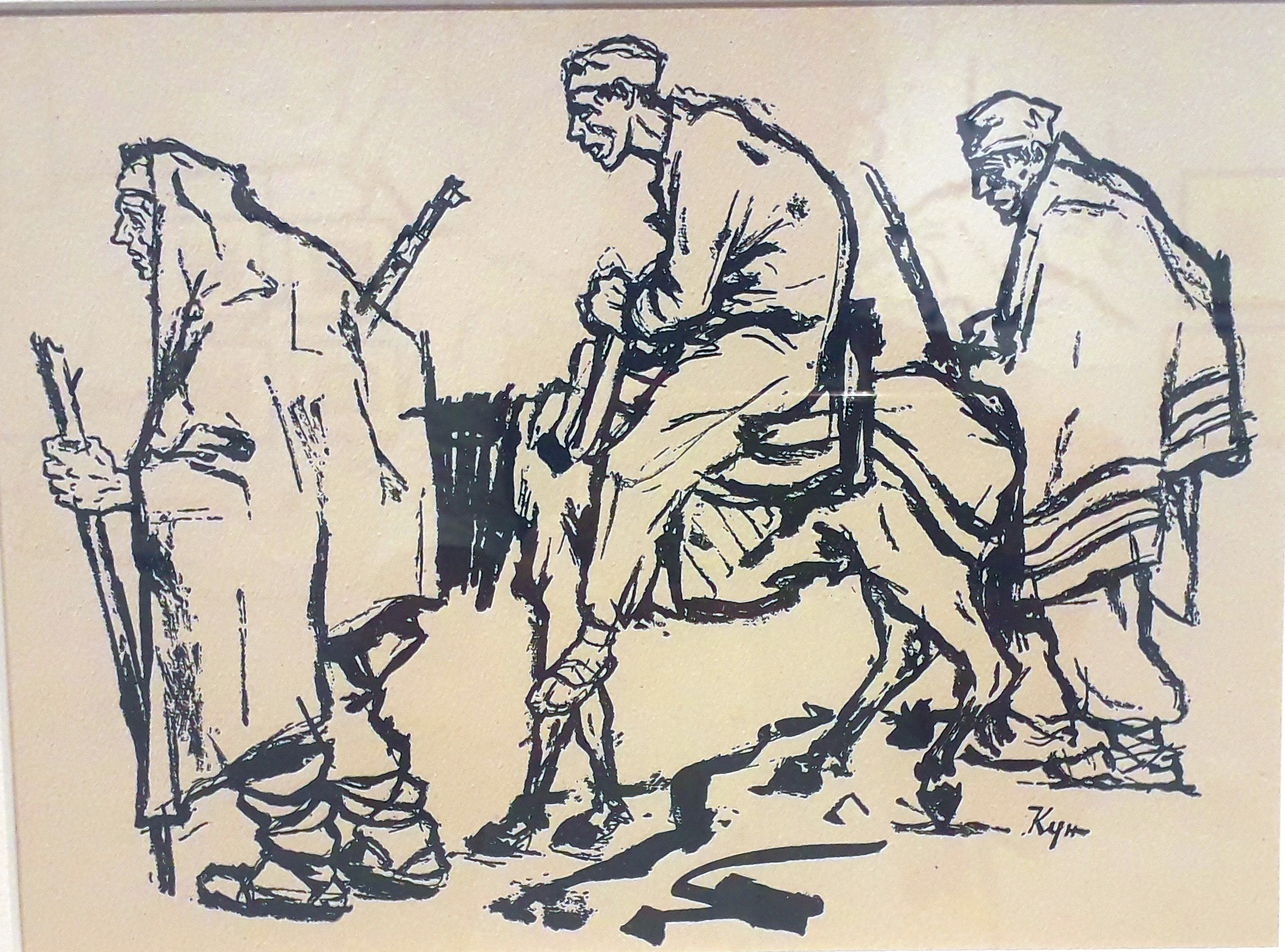
- Typhoid Sufferers by Đorđe Andrejević Kun
- Original title: Tifusari
- First published in: The Cock on the Roof
- Country: Yugoslavia
- Language: Serbo-Croatian
- Subjects: war; disease; death
- Publication date: 1950

Typhoid Sufferers^{[a]} (Serbo-Croatian: Tifusari) is a poem by Croatian writer Jure Kaštelan. The poem depicts hallucinations of typhoid-affected Yugoslav partisans marching through snow-covered wastelands during World War II.

It was first published in Kaštelan's 1950 book of poems The Cock on the Roof (Pijetao na krovu). In 1963 the poem was adapted into a short animated film of the same title directed by Vatroslav Mimica.

== Poem ==
Typhoid Sufferers

1
I count the tracks on candid snow. Death upon death.
Death are all my tracks.

Death upon death. Death upon death.
Death are all my tracks.

Every step goes onward to its tomb.

Every step goes onward to its tomb
as springs do to their sea.

Every step goes onward to its tomb.

2
Will the wide sky ever pass this path,
eye full of joy?
Will the wellsprings and flutes burst,
will the mornings chirp in spring?

Will the footsteps stay on ground,
pressed in with blood, and protest
or snows will cover in dead silence
words, traces and roads?

3
Blizzard. The wind is howling
There's not a wolf, nor a man.
- Fire! Fire! -
the bones are screaming.
- Stars! Stars! -
the eyes are searching.

The dark womb
will eat my fingers and mind...

Blizzard. The wind is howling.
There's not a wolf, nor a man.
- Dear men, brothers, men...
Weary steps
are deaf in silence.
I'm hearing words
in my fever.

- Comrade...
- Comrade...

I grab the cold hand.

I march
voiceless in a row.

4
Night does not speak.
Silence without spectres.
Voicelessly,
without a sound
a dead man
speaks through me.

Cetina, my beautiful village,
why are you so beautiful when I can't see you.

Night does not speak.
That's my mother's hand above my dream
above her son
and her dark, dark hair
like a dream rises from my forehead.

Night does not speak.
Behind the mount death is forging knives
and the black hole
is opening its mouth:
it's spitting fires and gallows.

Cetina, my beautiful village.

Night does not speak.
Without morning and without wings
one last word
and the last farewell
the death has given to me.

5
Whence this day, fiery dove on the palm,
whence this voice, on which shore does it grow
all dawn-born? Hear the night when fires alight in the wood.

Whence this voice, on which shore does it grow?
In each track, on each step: freedom, freedom,
freedom out of the wound, freedom out of blood does grow.

In each track, on each step: freedom, freedom:
when songs are dying, you that are all love,
as a wild rose on the wayside, as spread wings.

You that are all love, when songs are dying,
will you dying give off a living love-light
steel-rendering, death-defying?

Will you dying give off a living love-light
which is born anew in every single heart,
will you sing dawn-voiced in the night?

If I fall in the dark, carry my greetings to the living,
carry from tomb to heart, carry through darkness
the song that dies not: freedom, freedom.

6
The fever rises. I grab the hand.
Forehead of a comrade burns together with mine.
In a crazy blaze when mind is getting darkened
love speaks with an even stronger vengeance.

The row is marching. Great woods
are rising in fever, flourishing in sun.
I hear lively conversations in the dark,
with lively eyes I see the new days coming.

I see lakes quiet and transparent,
willow from the childhood bent over river,
and new words never heard before,
people from the land, known and far.

My country, you see me naked,
lousy, all covered in wounds,
powerless, hunched, I barely walk -
and that is why you're even more part of me.

From forehead to forehead, the fire is burning.
Lips of a blaze and hunger yearn for a drop of water.
Darkness covers its eyes, closer we get to the dawn,
the night becomes longer.

Step by step. Death swallows
a man and a horse. No dawn for me,
but in death we're still partisans
and our dead fight even stronger.

Tifusari

1
Brojim stope na bijelu snijegu. Smrt do smrti.
Smrt su stope moje.

Smrt do smrti. Smrt do smrti.
Smrt su stope moje.

Svaka ide svome grobu.

Svaka ide svome grobu
ko izvori svome moru.

Svaka ide svome grobu.

2
Hoće li ikad ovom stazom proći
nebo široko, oko puno sreće?
Da li će briznuti frule i izvori
i cvrkutati jutra u proljeće?

Hoće li stope ostati na zemlji
i prkositi krvlju utisnute
ili će snjegovi u mrkloj tišini
zamesti riječi, tragove i pute?

3
Vijavica. Vjetar vije.
Čovjeka ni vuka nije.
– Ognja, ognja –
kosti vrište.
– Zvijezde, zvijezde –
oko ište.

Žvale mračne, večerat će
moje prste i možđane…

Vijavica. Vjetar vije.
Čovjeka ni vuka nije.
– Ljudi mili, braćo, ljudi…
U tišini gluvi korak
izmoreni.
Slušam riječi
u ognjici.

– Druže…
– Druže…

Rukom hvatam ladnu ruku.

Idem nijem
u koloni.

4
Ne zbori noć.
Tišina bez utvara.
Nijemo
bez glasa
u meni
mrtvac progovara.

Oj, Cetino, moje selo ravno
kud si ravno kad si vodoplavno

Ne zbori noć.
To majka ruke nad mojim snom
nad svojim sinom savija
i njena crna, crna kosa
ko san na mojem čelu klija.

Ne zbori noć.
Za gorom smrt noževe kuje
i jama – mješina
nozdrve nadima:
požare i vješala bljuje.

Oj Cetino, moje selo ravno

Ne zbori noć.
Bez jutra i bez krila
još zadnju riječ
i zadnji pozdrav
smrt mi je ostavila.

5
Otkuda ovaj dan, ognjeni golub na dlanu,
otkuda ovaj glas, na kojoj obali raste
sav od svitanja? Čuj noć kad vatre u šumi planu.

Otkuda ovaj glas, na kojoj obali raste?
U svakoj stopi, na svakom koraku: sloboda, sloboda,
sloboda iz rane, iz krvi sloboda izraste.

U svakoj stopi, na svakom koraku; sloboda, sloboda.
Kad pjesme umiru, ti što si ljubav sama,
ko divlja ruža na putu, ko raširena krila.

Kad pjesme umiru, ti što si ljubav sama,
hoćeš li umirući živu ljubav dati
što prkosi smrti i čelik prelama?

Hoćeš li umirući živu ljubav dati
što u svakom srcu iznova se rađa,
hoćeš li glasom zore u noći zapjevati?

Ako panem u mraku, prenesi živima pozdrav,
prenesi od groba do srca, pronesi kroz tminu
pjesmu što ne gine; sloboda, sloboda.

6
Ognjica raste. Rukom ruku hvatam.
Uz čelo druga moje čelo gori.
U požaru ludom kad se pamet mrači
osvetom još jačom, ljubav progovori.

Kolona ide. U groznici rastu
goleme šume suncem rascvjetane.
U mraku čujem žive razgovore,
Očima živih gledam nove dane.

Gledam jezera prozirna i mirna,
vrbu djetinjstva svinutu nad rijekom
i nove riječi nikad nečuvene,
ljude u kraju znanom i dalekom.

Rođena zemljo, nisam te dočeko,
nego u gunju, ušljiv, sav od rana,
nemoćan, zguren, jedva korak vučem –
i zato si jače u me urezana.

Od čela do čela samo vatra gori.
Glad i oganj žedne usne pruža
za kapljom vode. Tmina oči steže,
i što smo bliže zori noć postaje duža.

Korak po korak. Smrt u jarak baci
čovjeka i konja. Za me nema zore,
ali i u smrti mi smo partizani
I naši mrtvi još se jače bore.

== Notes ==
^{1}Sometimes translated as Typhus Victims

== See also ==
- Typhoid Sufferers (film)
