= Mysooru Mallige =

Poetry by K. S. Narasimhaswamy

Mysooru Mallige (transl. Jasmine of Mysuru) is a literary work of Kannada poet K. S. Narasimhaswamy. The collection of poems inspired a movie made by T.S. Nagabharana and also a musical play by Kalagangothri. The book was first released in 1942 at Maharaja College. Due to its popularity, the book was often presented in marriages and it has been re-printed several times.

It was adapted into the 1992 Kannada movie Mysore Mallige which was reported to be an inspiration for the 1994 Hindi movie 1942: A Love Story.

== Contents ==
It is the narration style, centered on the observations of a theater director, B.V. Rajaram. By according flexibility to the character of "Balegaara Channayya" (fictitious character of a bangle seller in rural parts, who converses with the granddaughter of the poet and looks critically at the socio-economic changes in the post-Independence era), he succeeds in communicating effectively.

== Film adaptation ==
While T. S. Nagabharana directed Mysooru Mallige based on the poems of Narasimhaswamy and portrayed rural life and the pre-Independence movement, Rajaram dared to explore various stages in the poet's life, beginning from adolescence to old age in a vivid manner and unveil life in its entirety to the viewers.

== Theatrical adaptation ==
Rajendra Karanth aptly adapted the poetry to the theatre and made it more contemporary. He adapted songs by P. Kalinga Rao, Mysore Ananthaswamy and C. Ashwath, who have popularised the poems of Narasimhaswamy. However, by using popular songs, S. R. Ramakrishna lost the opportunity to experiment with the (Ranga-Geethegalu) songs meant specifically for theatre production. But poems such as "Balegara Channayya, Bagilige Bandihanu", "Hattu Varshada Hinde" and "Nee Baruva Dariyali" enthralled theatre lovers.

== Audio cassette of Mysore Mallige (Sugama Sangeeta) ==
The unique aspect of the cassette is the narration before the commencement of the songs by Kannada poet Dr. N. S. Lakshmi Narayana Bhatta. The narration makes some of the rare revelations like the one about the Kannada poet Da Ra Bendre's acknowledgement of K. S. Narasimhaswamy's prowess. Dr. N. S. Lakshmi Narayana Bhatta in his narration compares Mysore Mallige songs to the "beauty of Apsara".

== Poems ==
- Ninna Hesaru
- Rayaru Bandaru
- Akki Aarisuvaaga
- Ondirulu Kanasinale
- Ninna Olumeindale
- Baare Nanna Sharade
- Modala Dina Mauna
- Balegaara Cheennaya
- Ninna Premada Pariya
- Taura Sukadolagenna
- Nagu

== See also ==
- Mysore Mallige (film)
- List of Kannada-language poets
