= Jure Kaštelan =

Croatian poet and writer

Juraj "Jure" Kaštelan (Croatian pronunciation: [jǔːre kaʃtělan]; 18 December 1919 – 24 February 1990) was a Croatian poet and writer.

== Education and career ==
Juraj "Jure" Kaštelan was born on 18 December 1919 in Zakučac in Dalmatia. He attended primary school in Split and then matriculated to the Zagreb Faculty of Arts, but the war interrupted his studies. In 1942 he joined the National Liberation Struggle and worked with the Partisan press. After the war, he completed his degree in Slavic languages and worked as a reporter for the newspaper Vjesnik, as an editor for a publishing company called "Nopok," and then as the assistant Chair of the department of Yugoslav literature at the Faculty of Arts in Zagreb. From 1956–1958 he taught Serbo-Croatian language at the Sorbonne. In 1957 he defended his dissertation on the poetry of Antun Gustav Matoš. Afterwards he lectured on theory of literature at the Zagreb Faculty of Arts.

In 1965 he was awarded the Vladimir Nazor Award for Literature, and in 1979 he became a member of the Yugoslav Academy of Sciences and Arts. He died in 1990.

== Writing ==
Kaštelan is one of the most important Croatian poets of the twentieth century. His first poems were published in 1936 and 1937 (hrvatska suvremena knjizevnost 61-3); His first book, Crveni konj (The Red Horse) was published in 1940 in Zagreb, but it was quickly banned and destroyed by the police. This collection espoused revolutionary sentiments that were pervasive among young Croatian poets before the war. Kaštelan believed that poets were not exempt from participating in the struggle towards a better life; when the war began, he joined the Partisan Movement (Columbia).

Unsurprisingly, much of Kaštelan’s early work addressed topics related to the war. Before the war began, he felt torn between his childhood memories and beauty that he wanted to remember, but he began to be pulled away by ideas of revolution and war and their uncertainty and unpredictability.

During the war he wrote about the revolution and partisan struggles, “blending the personal with the general." “His cycle Tifusari (Typhus Victims), together with Goran Kovačić’s Jama (The Pit) and Popovič’s Oci (Eyes), is no doubt artistically the most dramatic saga of suffering, death, yearning after life in Yugoslav Partisan Poetry." In particular, “out of the senseless cruelty of foreign occupation and internecine strife there came such negative existential statements as the powerful and famous poem ‘Jadikovka kamena’ (1951; Lament of a Stone). On the other hand, even in the midst of wartime ferocity, Kaštelan found within the Partisan Resistance movement a spirit of comradeship that brought a glimmer of light into the darkness of his despair and that has inspired many of his best poems” (Columbia). Thus, his poetry contains a mixture of both optimistic and pessimistic messages. For example, in the first poem of the cycle “Tifusari” (Typhoid Sufferers) he reassures the typhus victims that, though they are suffering, they will soon be in Heaven, whereas those who survive the war may never see their hopes of revolution fulfilled, i.e. they will remain trapped and enslaved.

Besides the war, some other themes in Kaštelan’s poetry include reflections on his childhood and homeland, and his later works focused on the problems of modern man and the “contemplation of human existence." “Some critics have seen in Kaštelan’s work the influence of folk poetry and surrealism, as well as that of such writers as Dragutin Tadijanović, Miroslav Krleža, Federico García Lorca, and Walt Whitman” (Columbia). However, his poetry has a unique style. Moreover, he is responsible for bringing elements of Modernism and Yugoslav Surrealism to Croatian poetry.

Though Kaštelan is best known for his poetry, he also wrote a play (Pijesak i pjena, Sand and Foam; 1958), a collection of short stories (Čudo i smrt, Wonder and Death), numerous essays, articles, commentaries, and criticisms of contemporary Croatian poets. In addition, he edited works by a number of his contemporaries.

== Works ==
=== Poetry ===
- 1940 Crvenji konj (The Red Horse)
- 1950 Pjetao na krovu (The Cock on the Roof)
- 1955 Biti ili ne (To Be or Not to Be)
- 1956 Zvjezdana noć (Starry Night)
- 1957 Malo kamena i puno snova (A Bit of Stone and a Lot of Dreams)
- 1964 Izbor pjesama (Selected Poems)

=== Nonfiction ===
- 1957 Lirika Antuna Gustava Matoša (The Lyrics of Antun Gustav Matoš)

=== Plays ===
- 1958 Pijesak i pjena (Sand and Foam)

=== Short stories ===
- 1961 Čudo i smrt (Wonder and Death)
