= Lady Clare =

Poem by Alfred Tennyson

- by Alfred Tennyson
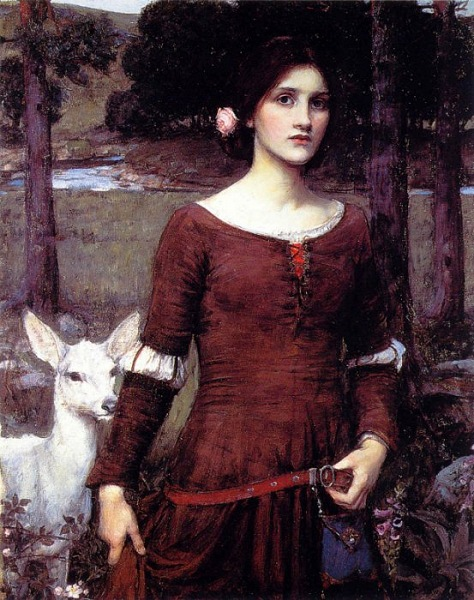
- The Lady Clare by J. W. Waterhouse (1900)
- Genre: Romanticism
- Meter: Iambic tetrameter
- Rhyme scheme: ABAB
- Publication date: 1842; 1851
- Lines: 88

Full text
- Lady Clare at Wikisource

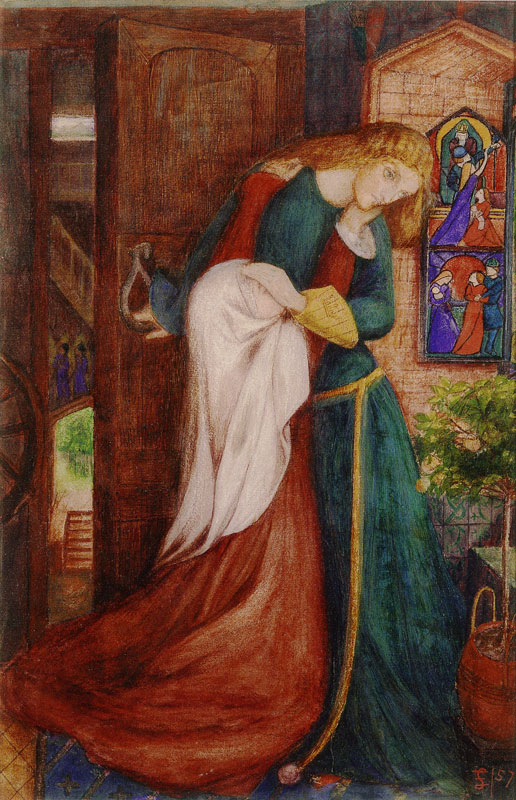
Lady Clare (watercolour) by Elizabeth Siddal (c. 1854–1857)

Lady Clare is a narrative poem by Alfred, Lord Tennyson, first published in 1842. It tells of Lady Clare, a young noblewoman engaged to be married to Lord Ronald, who is her cousin and heir to her father's lands. When Lady Clare tells her nurse, Alice, the news, the old woman reveals she is the maiden's true mother, who switched her at birth with the real Lady Clare who died in infancy. Stunned by the revelation, Lady Clare resolves to tell Lord Ronald the truth in spite of Alice's objections.

== Plot synopsis ==
Lady Clare is an earl's daughter engaged to be married to her cousin Lord Ronald, who is also heir to her father's lands. Lord Ronald gives Lady Clare a white doe, which she accepts as proof of his love for her, and their wedding is scheduled to take place the following day.

Lady Clare later informs her old nurse, Alice, the news of her upcoming wedding. Alice is happy for Lady Clare, only for the old woman to reveal that she is the young maiden's biological mother and that the real Lady Clare actually died in infancy; not wanting to deprive her master of his only child, Alice swapped her own daughter with Lady Clare, claiming the dead baby as hers.

Stunned by the revelation and believing she had deprived Lord Ronald of his birthright, Lady Clare resolves to tell him the truth in spite of her birth mother's objections. Lady Clare casts off her jewellery and fine gowns and walks out of her home dressed as a commoner, followed closely by her white doe.

When Lord Ronald sees her and asks for an explanation, Lady Clare tells him the truth and asks him to call off their engagement and cancel their wedding. However, Lord Ronald tells his fiancée that he will always love her and that they will still get married, thus making her Lady Clare by marriage.

== Textual history ==
Lady Clare was first published in 1842. After 1851 no alterations were made.

This poem was suggested by Susan Ferrier's 1824 historical novel The Inheritance. A comparison with the plot of Ferrier's novel will show how Tennyson adapted the tale to his ballad:

Thomas St. Clair, youngest son of the Earl of Rossville, marries a Miss Sarah Black, a girl of humble and obscure birth. He dies, leaving a widow and as is supposed a daughter, Gertrude, who claim the protection of Lord Rossville, as the child is heiress presumptive to the earldom. On Lord Rossville's death she accordingly becomes Countess of Rossville. She has two lovers, both distant connections, Colonel Delmour and Edward Lyndsay. At last it is discovered that she was not the daughter of Thomas St. Clair and her supposed mother, but of one Marion La Motte and Jacob Leviston, and that Mrs. St. Clair had adopted her when a baby and passed her off as her own child, that she might succeed to the title. Meanwhile Delmour by the death of his elder brother succeeds to the title and estates forfeited by the detected foundling, but instead of acting as Tennyson's Lord Ronald does, he repudiates her and marries a duchess. But her other lover Lyndsay is true to her and marries her. Delmour not long afterwards dies without issue, and Lyndsay succeeds to the title, Gertrude then becoming after all Countess of Rossville.

In details Tennyson follows the novel sometimes very closely. Thus the "single rose", the poor dress, and the bitter exclamation about her being "a beggar born", are drawn from the novel.

The 1842 and all editions up to and including 1850 begin with the following stanza and omit stanza 2:—

Lord Ronald courted Lady Clare,
I trow they did not part in scorn;
Lord Ronald, her cousin, courted her
And they will wed the morrow morn.

== Bibliography ==
- Collins, John Churton, ed. (1900). The Early Poems of Alfred, Lord Tennyson. London: Methuen & Co. pp. 253–256.
- Tennyson, Hallam (1897). Alfred Lord Tennyson: A Memoir by his Son. Vol. 2. London: Macmillan and Co., Limited. p. 377–378.
