= The Old Swimmin' Hole (poem) =

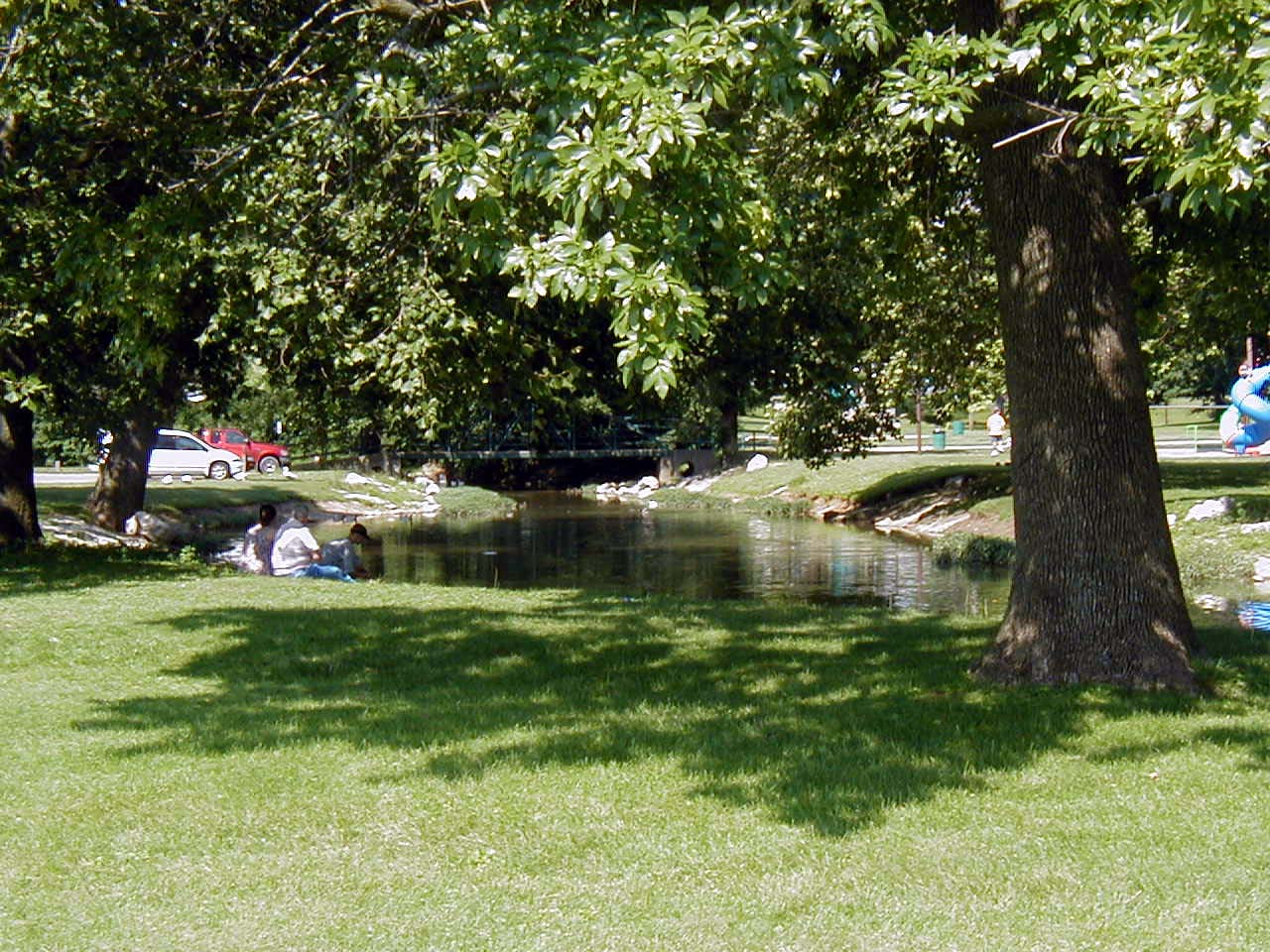
"The Old Swimmin' Hole" that appears in Riley's poems is now a large park on the east side of Greenfield.

The Old Swimmin' Hole was a poem written by James Whitcomb Riley under the pen name "Benjamin F. Johnson of Boone County". The poem was first published in 1883 as part of a book entitled The Old Swimmin' Hole and 'Leven More Poems. The poem is one of Riley's most famous and is written in eye dialect. It tells of events in Riley's youth as he reminisces about the Brandywine Creek, where he played with his friends during his boyhood. The poem was included in several other releases of Riley's works and has sold millions of copies.
