= K. S. Narasimhaswamy =

Indian poet (1915–2003)

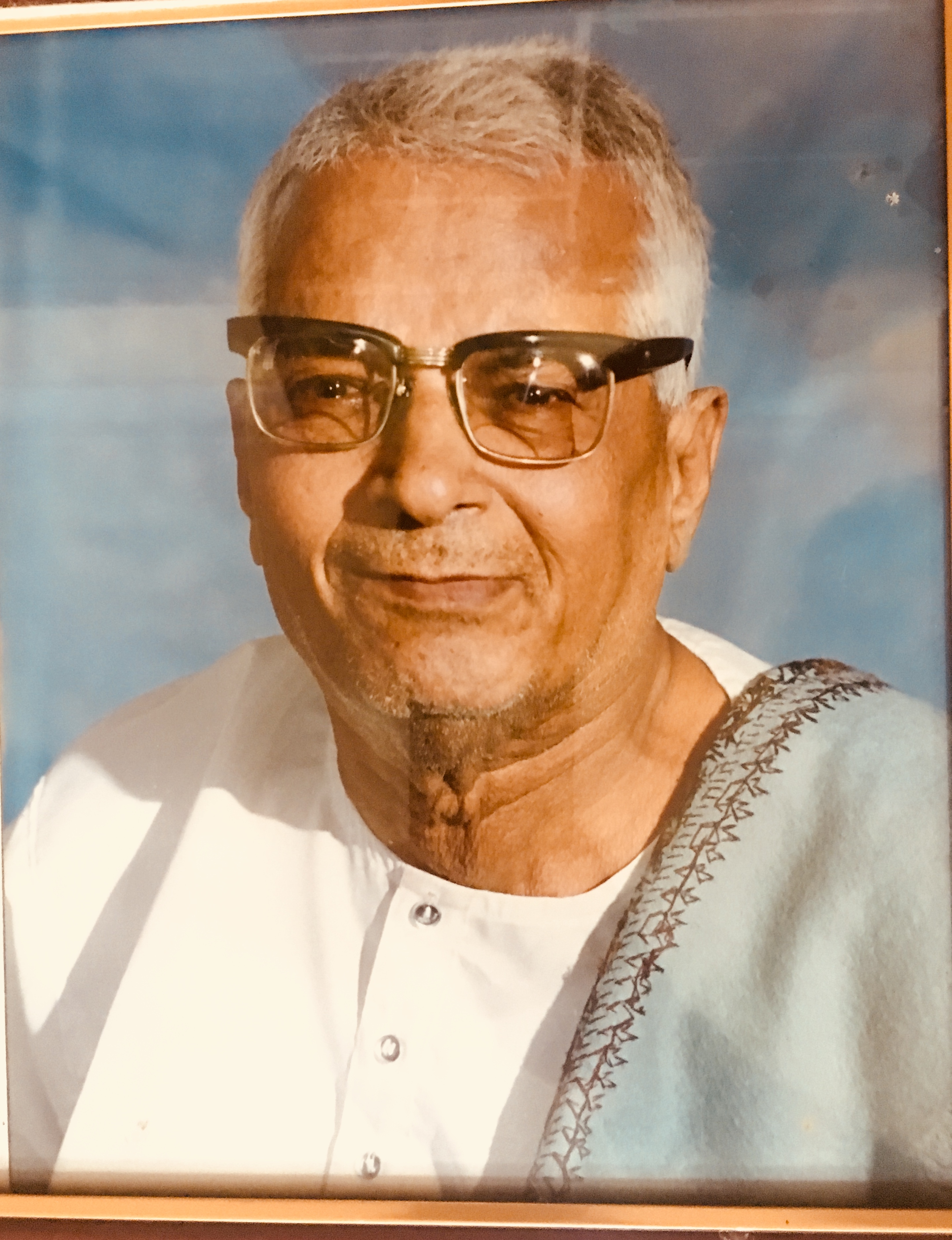
- Born: 26 January 1915; Kikkeri, Mysore district, Kingdom of Mysore, British India (now Mandya district, Karnataka, India)
- Died: 27 December 2003 (aged 88); Bangalore, India
- Occupation: Poet
- Writing career
- Period: Navodaya, Romantic movement
- Notable awards: National Film Award for Best Lyrics –1991; Pampa Award – 1995

Kikkeri Subbarao Narasimhaswamy (26 January 1915 – 27 December 2003) was an Indian poet who wrote in Kannada language. His most popular collection of poems, Mysooru Mallige, has seen more than thirty-two reprints and is sometimes given to newly married couples in Karnataka. Narasimhaswamy is a recipient of the Sahitya Akademi Award, Kannada sahitya Academy Award, and the Asian Prize for literature.

== Early life ==
Narasimhaswamy was born in Kikkeri in Mandya district. He abandoned studies after his father, who wanted him to become an engineer, died, and took up a job of a clerk in a municipal office in Mysore. However, in 1934, he joined the Central College in Bangalore, where he obtained a Bachelor of Arts degree. He was transferred to Bangalore in 1954 and retired as a superintendent in the Karnataka Housing Board in the 1970s. He married Venkamma in Tiptur in 1936. He often portrayed his wife as the inspiration for his poems which mainly deal with romance in married life.

== Works ==
Narasimhaswamy's first work as a writer that was published was Mysooru Mallige, a collection of poems, in 1942. It celebrated the blossoming of love between a newly married couple. He was influenced by English Romanticism, in particular, B. M. Srikantaiah's English Geethegalu (1926), a translation of English poems of the genre.

Narasimhaswamy's romantic love poems, inspired by Robert Burns (whose work he translated to Kannada as Robert Burnsna Premageetegalu) were unique to the language at the time when most Kannada poetry dealt with nature and the natural world.

== Publications ==
=== Poetry collections ===
- Mysooru Mallige (1942)
- Ungura (1942)
- Airaavatha (1945)
- Deepada Malli (1947)
- Iruvanthige (1952)
- Shilaalathe (1958)
- Maneyinda Manege (1960)
- Tereda Baagilu (1976)
- Navapallava (1983)
- Malligeya Maale (1986, 2004)
- Dundu Mallige (1993)
- Navila Dani (1999)
- Sanje Haadu (2000)
- Kaimarada Nelalalli (2001)
- Ede Thumba Nakshtra (2002)
- Mounadali Maatha Hudukutha (2003)
- Deepa Saalina Naduve (2003)
- Haadu-Hase (A Collection of songs) (2003)
- Ikkala
- Dandu Mallige

=== Translations ===
- Media (1966)
- Robert Burns Kaviya kelavu Premageetegalu (1997)
- Kelavu Chinee Kavanagalu (1997)

=== Prose ===
- Maariya Kallu (1942)
- Upavana (1958)
- Damayanthi (1960)
- Sirimallige (1990)

== Media gallery ==
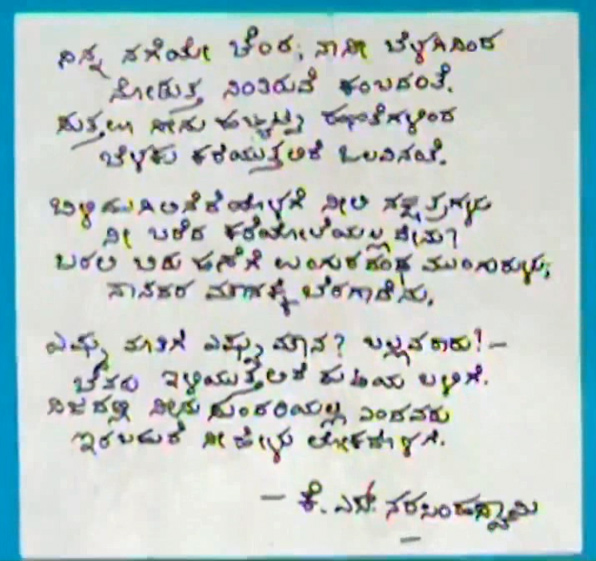
′Malligeya Maale′, a poem hand-written by Narasimhaswamy

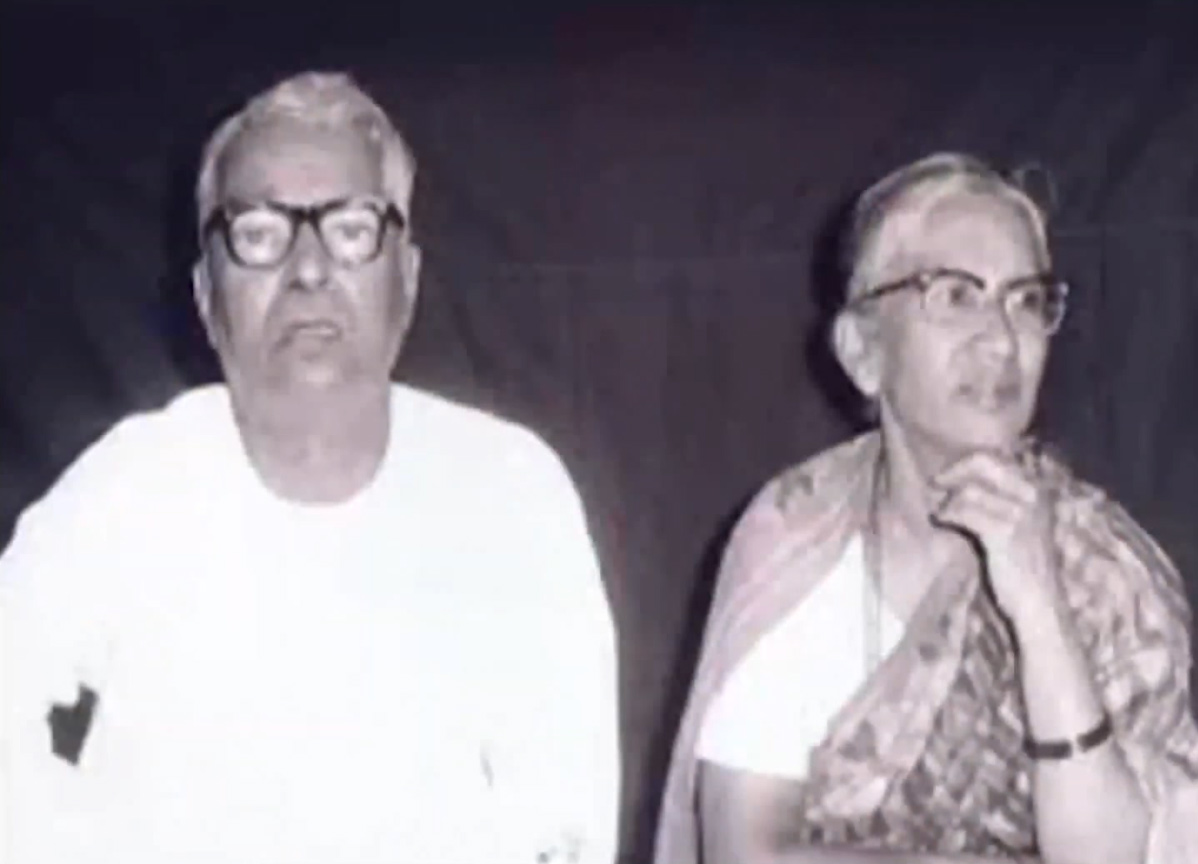
Narasimhaswamy with wife Venkamma

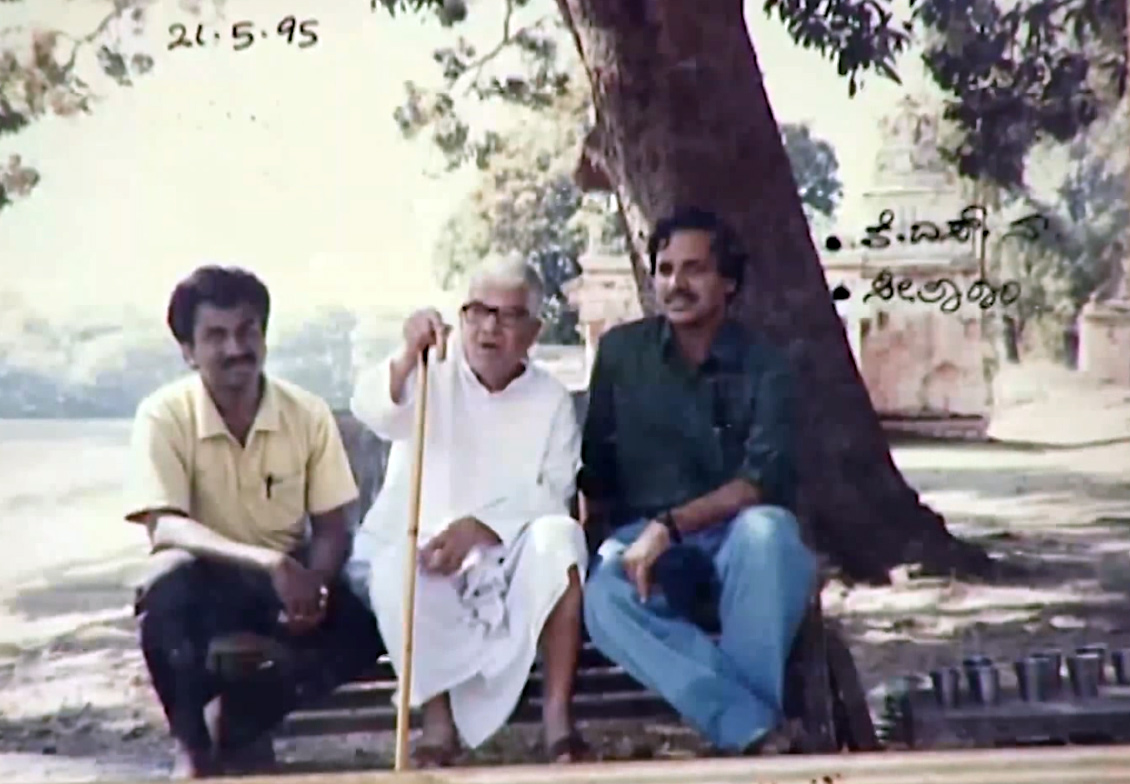
P.Sheshadri (left), Narasimhaswamy (center) and T. N. Seetharam (right), during the making of Mayamruga

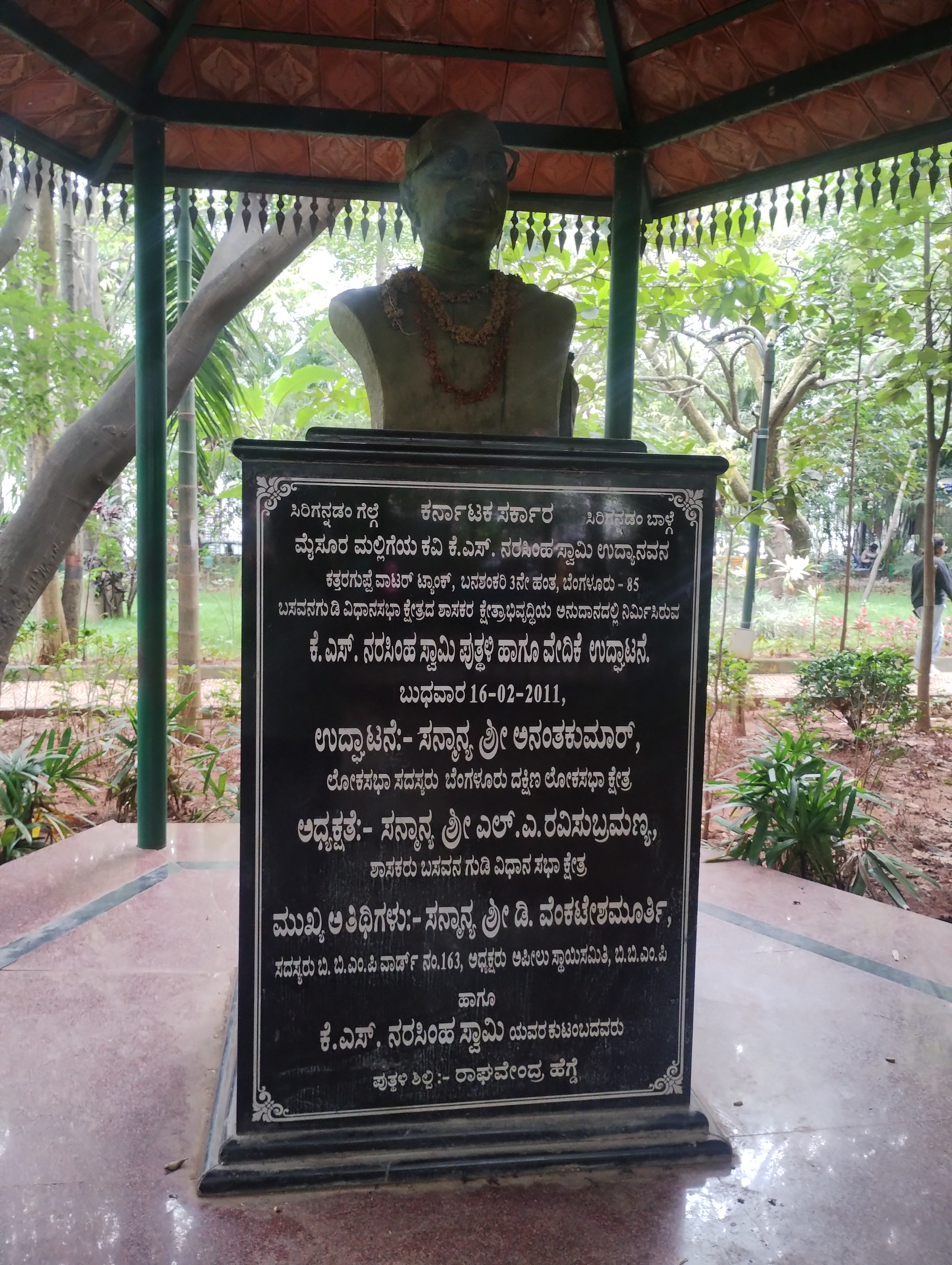
Statue of the poet in K. S. Narasimha Swamy Park, Banashankari 3rd stage, Bengaluru (2025)

== See also ==
- Kannada poetry
