= Abbas filmography =

List of films by Indian actor Abbss

- Film: 52
- Television series: 2
- Music videos: 1

Abbas is an Indian actor known for his works in Tamil and Telugu films. He also acted in Malayalam, Kannada and Hindi cinema as well. He made his acting debut in Kadhal Desam (1996), with Vineeth and Tabu, which became a great success. He made his Telugu debut with — Priya O Priya (1997), followed by Rajahamsa (1998), which were successful. After a series of failures, Abbas appeared alongside Karthik in Pooveli (1998), which later became a blockbuster. In 1999, he debuted in Malayalam cinema with Kannezhuthi Pottum Thottu, which became a super-hit.

He then co-starred with Venkatesh and Soundarya in Telugu romantic-drama Raja (1999), which became a blockbuster. Abbas played role of Rajinikanth's son-in-law in Padayappa (1999), which became highest grossing Tamil film of the year. His next venture was Suyamvaram (1999), which holds the Guinness World Record for casting the most stars in a film and also for being the quickest ever feature-length film made, with filming being completed in 23 hours and 58 minutes. Then he co-starred with Sathyaraj in Malabar Police (1999), which became one of the biggest blockbuster hits of 1999.

In 2000, Abbas starred in Rajiv Menon's multi-starred Kandukondain Kandukondain, alongside Mammootty, Ajith Kumar, Aishwarya Rai Bachchan and Tabu. The film became a success at the box office and casting was praised. In 2001, Abbas co-starred with Madhavan and Reema Sen in Minnale (2001), which became another biggest hit of his career. This was second collaboration of Abbas and Madhavan after Shanti Shanti Shanti (1998). Abbas appeared in multi-starer Aanandham, which was second collaboration of Abbas and Mammootty. The film met with positive reviews and became one of the "blockbusters" of the year and became most successful film of his career. For the next decades Abbas appeared in multi starrer films — Nee Premakai (2002), Pammal K. Sambandam (2002), Adi Thadi (2004) and Anasuya (2009). In 2010, Abbas starred in Kannda film — Appu and Pappu which became a surprise success.

== Filmography ==
Year	Title	Role	Language	Notes
1996	Kadhal Desam	Arun	Tamil	
1997	V.I.P.	Santhosh	Tamil	
1997	Priya O Priya	Vamsi	Telugu	
1997	Poochudava	Kannan	Tamil	
1998	Ini Ellam Sugame	Aravind	Tamil	
1998	Shanti Shanti Shanti	Raju	Kannada	
1998	Jolly	Gauri Shankar	Tamil	
1998	Rajahamsa	Raju	Telugu	
1998	Aasai Thambi	Vijay	Tamil	
1998	Pooveli	Arun	Tamil	
1999	Raja	Sanjay	Telugu	Special appearance
1999	Padayappa	Chandraprakash	Tamil	
1999	Alludugaaru Vachcharu	Madhu	Telugu	
1999	Suyamvaram	Indiran	Tamil	
1999	Malabar Police	Raja	Tamil	
1999	Kannezhuthi Pottum Thottu	Moosakutty	Malayalam	
1999	Anaganaga Oka Ammai	Sathya	Telugu	
1999	Krishna Babu	Vijay Babu	Telugu	
2000	Hey Ram	Munavar	Tamil; Hindi	
2000	Kandukondain Kandukondain	Srikanth	Tamil	
2000	Dreams	Shiva	Malayalam	
2000	Madhuri	Anand	Telugu	
2001	Minnale	Rajiv Samuel	Tamil	
2001	Vinnukum Mannukum	Himself	Tamil	Cameo appearance
2001	Aanandham	Kannan	Tamil	
2002	Pammal K. Sambandam	Anand	Tamil	
2002	Nee Premakai	Prabhu	Telugu	
2002	Ansh	Rajnath Guru	Hindi	
2002	Kadhal Virus	Rajiv	Tamil	
2003	Kadhaludan	Durai	Tamil	
2003	Banda Paramasivam	Madhavan	Tamil	
2003	Parasuram	Shiva	Tamil	
2003	Zinda Dil	Vijay	Hindi	
2003	Three Roses	Himself	Tamil	Cameo appearance
2003	Sindhamal Sitharamal	Saravanan	Tamil	
2004	Greetings	Swaminathan	Malayalam	
2004	Swetha Naagu	Praveen	Telugu; Kannada	
2004	Shock	Ajay	Tamil	
2004	Adi Thadi	Arjun	Tamil	
2004	Manasthan	Selvarasu	Tamil	
2004	Azhagiya Theeye	Himself	Tamil	Cameo appearances
2004	Adhu	Raj	Tamil	Cameo appearances
2005	Kalyana Kurimanam	Vishnu	Malayalam	
2005	Political Rowdy	Karthik	Telugu	
2005	Dil Ke Peeche Peeche	Arjun	Hindi	
2005	Kadha	Gautham	Malayalam	
2005	Vanakkam Thalaiva	Mano	Tamil	
2006	Unarchigal	Balaji	Tamil	
2006	Thiruttu Payale	Ramesh	Tamil	
2006	47A Besant Nagar Varai	Ramakrishnan	Tamil	
2007	Mouryan	Shivashangaran	Malayalam	
2007	Chandrahas	Firoj	Telugu	
2007	Anasuya	Anand	Telugu	
2008	Sadhu Miranda	Ram Mohan	Tamil	
2008	Idi Sangathi	Sathyamurthy	Telugu	
2009	Bank	Abbas	Telugu	
2009	Guru En Aalu	Krishna	Tamil	
2010	Appu and Pappu	Ramesh	Kannada	
2010	Ramdev	Ram	Telugu	
2011	Ko	Himself	Tamil	Cameo appearance
2011	Maaro	Raj Mohan	Telugu	
2014	Savaari 2	Dinakar Shetty	Kannada	
2014	Ala Jarigindi Oka Roju	Rahul	Telugu	
2014	Ramanujan	Prasanta Chandra Mahalanobis	English; Tamil	
2015	Pachakkallam	Venkitesh	Malayalam	
2026	Happy Raj	Rajiv	Tamil	Return to Tamil Cinema after 12 years
2026	Half	Selli	Malayalam	

=== Music videos ===
Year	Album	Language	Notes
1997	Yeh Hai Prem	Hindi	Trilogy

=== Television ===
List of television shows and roles
Year	Title	Role	Language	Notes
2012	Dharmayutham	Rammohan	Tamil	
2013–2014	Vaidehi		Tamil	
2026	Exam	Jayachandran	Tamil	
