= List of songs recorded by Srinivas =

Srinivas (7 November 1959) is an Indian playback singer and music composer. Best known for his work in Tamil films and all the other South Indian and Hindi language films, Srinivas has recorded over 3000 songs. He has also recorded songs for many non-film albums, tele-series, devotionals and classical collaborations.

Srinivas debuted into playback singer through the song "Sorgam Enbathu Namakku" from the film Nammavar (1994) and shot to fame with the song "Maana Madurai" from the film Minsara Kanavu (1997) which was composed by A. R. Rahman. Apart from Rahman, he recorded many hundreds of songs for composers such as Vidyasagar, Mani Sharma, Koti, Deva, Hamsalekha and others.

== Recorded film songs ==
This is only a partial list; Srinivas has sung over 3000 songs in Tamil, Hindi, Kannada, Telugu, Malayalam and Marathi.

=== Tamil film songs ===
==== 1990s ====
Year	Film	Song	Composer(s)	Writer(s)	Co-artist(s)
1994	Nammavar	"Sorgam Enbathu Namakku"	Mahesh Mahadevan	Vairamuthu	Swarnalatha
1995	Bombay	"Idhu Annai Bhoomi"	A. R. Rahman	Vairamuthu	Sujatha, Anuradha Sriram, Noel James, Sivanesan, Ganga Sitharasu, Renuka
1996	Indian	"Telephone Manipol"	A. R. Rahman	Vairamuthu	Hariharan, Harini
1996	Mr. Romeo	"Mellisaye"	A. R. Rahman	Vairamuthu	Swarnalatha, Unni Menon, Sujatha
1996	Mr. Romeo	"Yaar Adhu"	A. R. Rahman	Vaali	Noel James, Anto, Chandran
1997	Minsara Kanavu	"Maana Madurai"	A. R. Rahman	Vairamuthu	K. S. Chithra, Unni Menon
1997	Nerukku Ner	"Akhila Akhila"	Deva	Vairamuthu	Annupamaa
1997	Ratchagan	"Kanava Illa Kaatraa"	A. R. Rahman	Vairamuthu	
1998	Uyirodu Uyiraga	"Poovukkellam Siragu"	Vidyasagar	Vairamuthu	KK, Harini
1998	Pooveli	"Vaazhkai"	Bharadwaj	Vairamuthu	
1998	Thalaimurai	"Enga Maharaani"	Ilaiyaraaja	Vasan	Ilaiyaraaja
1998	Uyire (D)	"Thayya Thayya (Remix)"	A. R. Rahman	Vairamuthu	Sukhwinder Singh, Hariharan
1998	Uyire (D)	"En Uyire"	A. R. Rahman	Vairamuthu	Sujatha
1998	Relax (D)	Paadiko Don't Care"	Sandeep Chowta	Vaali	
1999	Padayappa	"Minsara Poove"	A. R. Rahman	Vairamuthu	Nithyasree Mahadevan
1999	Anantha Poongatre	"Yakka Yakka"	Deva	Vairamuthu	Swarnalatha
1999	Kadhalar Dhinam	"Nenaichchapadi"	A. R. Rahman	Vaali	M. G. Sreekumar, Ganga Sitharasu, Kanchana
1999	Sangamam	"Mudhal Murai"	A. R. Rahman	Vairamuthu	Sujatha
1999	Rojavanam	"Maname Maname"	Bharadwaj	Palani Bharathi	
1999	Poovellam Kettuppar	"Sevvanam Vetkam"	Yuvan Shankar Raja	Palani Bharathi	
1999	Amarkkalam	"Kaalam Kalikaalam"	Bharadwaj	Vairamuthu	
1999	Jodi	"Oru Poiyavadhu"	A. R. Rahman	Vairamuthu	Sujatha
1999	Pooparika Varugirom	"Kannum Kannum"	Vidyasagar	Vaasan	Sujatha
1999	Pooparika Varugirom	"Ettil Azhagu"	Vidyasagar	Vaasan	
1999	Unakkaga Ellam Unakkaga	"Duniya Hey Duniya"	Yuvan Shankar Raja	Kalaikumar	Sandeep
1999	Hello	"Chella Chella"	Deva	Vairamuthu	Anuradha Sriram
1999	Mudhalvan	"Ulunthu Vithaikayile"	A. R. Rahman	Vairamuthu	Swarnalatha, Hariharan, Mahalakshmi Iyer
1999	Ooty	"Nee Armstrong"	Deva	Pulamaipithan	
1999	Taj Mahal	"Chotta Chotta"	A. R. Rahman	Vairamuthu	
1999	Taj Mahal	"Karisal Tharasil"	A. R. Rahman	Vairamuthu	M. G. Sreekumar, K. S. Chithra
1999	Sundari Neeyum Sundaran Naanum	"Manipura Manipura"	Deva	Kamakodiyan	Anuradha Sriram
1999	Aasaiyil Oru Kaditham	"Aasayil Oru Kaditham"	Deva	Vairamuthu	
1999	Aasaiyil Oru Kaditham	"Vanilave"	Deva	Vairamuthu	Sujatha
1999	Manam Virumbuthe Unnai	"Manasa Killi"	Ilaiyaraaja	Palani Bharathi	S. N. Surendar
1999	Paattali	"Ulaga Azhagiyaa"	S. A. Rajkumar	Kalidasan	Harini, Anuradha Sriram

==== 2000s ====
Year	Film	Song	Composer(s)	Writer(s)	Co-artist(s)
2000	Good Luck	"July Pathinaru Vanthal"	Manoj Bhatnagar	Vairamuthu	Sujatha, K. S. Chithra
2000	Alaipayuthey	"Endrendrum Punnagai"	A. R. Rahman	Vairamuthu	Clinton Cerejo, Shankar Mahadevan, A. R. Rahman
2000	Alaipayuthey	"Snehithane Snehithane"	A. R. Rahman	Vairamuthu	Sadhana Sargam
2000	Alaipayuthey	"Maangalyam Thanthunanenam"	A. R. Rahman	Traditional	Clinton Cerejo, A. R. Rahman
2000	James Pandu	"Un Azhagai"	S. A. Rajkumar	Viveka	Reshmi
2000	Athey Manithan	"Pugai Padam"	Adithyan	Piraisoodan	
2000	Athey Manithan	"Vandanam Vandanam"	Adithyan	Piraisoodan	
2000	Kandukondain Kandukondain	"Yengae Enathu Kavithai"	A. R. Rahman	Thamarai	K. S. Chithra, Unni Menon
2000	Unakkaga Mattum	"Kadhal Seiyya"	Bobby Shankar	Pulamaipithan	Unni Menon
2000	Unakkaga Mattum	"Pen Pookkalodu"	Bobby Shankar	Pulamaipithan	Dinesh
2000	Unakkaga Mattum	"Vizhiyodu"	Bobby Shankar	Pulamaipithan	Sujatha
2000	Parthen Rasithen	"Kedaikkala"	Bharadwaj	Vairamuthu	
2000	Puratchikkaaran	"Ottrai Parvaiyala"	Vidyasagar	Vairamuthu	Harini
2000	Sathyaseelan	"Happy Aa Jolly Aa"	Vandemataram Srinivas		Lalitha Sagari
2000	Thenali	"Porkalam Angae"	A. R. Rahman	Piraisoodan	Gopika Poornima
2000	Thenali	"Alangatti Mazhai"	A. R. Rahman	Kalaikumar	Kamal Haasan, Sujatha, Sharanya Srinivas, Siloni Rath
2000	Vanna Thamizh Pattu	"Vilayattu Vilayattu"	S. A. Rajkumar	Vaali	Sujatha, Anuradha Sriram
2000	Snegithiye	"Kannukkulle"	Vidyasagar / Raghunath Seth	Pa. Vijay	
2000	Nee Enthan Vaanam	"Nee Enthan Vaanam"	Sangeetha Rajan	Piraisoodan	
2000	Thenali	“Swaasame Swaasame	A. R. Rahman	Pa. Vijay	S. P. Balasubrahmanyam & Sadhana Sargam
2001	Badri	"Kadhal Solvadhu"	Ramana Gogula	Palani Bharathi	Sunitha Upadrashta
2001	‘’Star’’	“Manasukal Oru Puyal”	A. R. Rahman	Vairamuthu	S. P. Balasubrahmanyam & Sadhana Sargam
2001	Kadhal Galatta (D)	"Edho Edho Ennil"	Mani Sharma		Gopika Poornima
2001	Little John	"Lady Don't Treat Me"	Pravin Mani	Vairamuthu	Sujatha
2001	Little John	"Jagamengum"	Pravin Mani	Vairamuthu	
2001	Seerivarum Kaalai	"Nalla Pillaiyaa"	Sirpy	Pulamaipithan	
2001	Asathal	"Ithu Meiyya Poiyya"	Bharadwaj	Gangai Amaran	
2001	Middle Class Madhavan	"Hamma Hamma"	Dhina	Vaali	Harini
2001	Lovely	"I Na Sabai"	Deva	Pa. Vijay	Harini
2001	Maayan	"Koraiyum Theerkum"	Deva	Inquilab	
2001	Pandavar Bhoomi	"Malargal Padaitha"	Bharadwaj	Snehan	
2001	Mitta Miraasu	"Kichu Kichu"	Aslam Mustafa	Palani Bharathi	Jaya
2001	Mitta Miraasu	"Vannakiliye"	Aslam Mustafa	Palani Bharathi	Sujatha
2001	Paarthale Paravasam	"Azhage Sugama"	A. R. Rahman	Vairamuthu	Sadhana Sargam
2001	Paarthale Paravasam	"Anbe Sugama"	A. R. Rahman	Vairamuthu	Sadhana Sargam
2001	Shahjahan	"Manidha Manidha"	Mani Sharma	Vairamuthu	
2001	Kadal Pookkal	"Alai Alai Alaikadale"	Deva	Vairamuthu	Unni Menon, Swarnalatha
2002	Alli Arjuna	"Endhan Nenjil"	A. R. Rahman	Vairamuthu	S. Janaki
2002	Pammal K. Sambandam	"Gadothkaja"	Deva	Vaali	Mahalakshmi Iyer
2002	Saptham	"Un Pugaipadathai"	Gana-Lal		Sujatha
2002	Roja Kootam	"Apple Penne"	Bharadwaj	Vairamuthu	
2002	Junior Senior	"Pudhusai Pudhusai"	Yuvan Shankar Raja	Pa. Vijay	Tippu
2002	Thulluvadho Ilamai	"Vayadhu Vaa Vaa"	Yuvan Shankar Raja	Pa. Vijay	Harini
2002	Enge Enadhu Kavithai	"Aayiram Aandugal"	Bharadwaj	Snehan	Reshmi
2002	Thenkasi Pattanam	"Konjam Thenkasi"	Suresh Peters	Palani Bharathi	K. S. Chithra, Palghat Sreeram
2002	Panchatanthiram	"Vai Raja Vai"	Deva	Vairamuthu	Shalini Singh
2002	Yai! Nee Romba Azhaga Irukke!	"Ini Naanum Naanillai"	Srinivas	Palani Bharathi	Sujatha, Sunitha Sarathy
2002	Baba	"Baba Theme"	A. R. Rahman	Vaali	
2002	Thamizh	"Vikkuthe Vikkuthe"	Bharadwaj	Vaali	Sujatha Mohan
2002	Naina	"Kadhalanae Uyire"	Sabesh–Murali	Pa. Vijay	Anuradha Sriram
2002	Namma Veetu Kalyanam	"Andha Vaanam Vittu"	S. A. Rajkumar	Pa. Vijay	Swarnalatha
2002	Samasthanam	"Oru Kurinji Poo"	Deva	Pa. Vijay	Krishnaraj, Anuradha Sriram
2002	Jjunction	"Devathaiya"	Bharadwaj	Newton	Reshmi
2002	Five Star	"Thiru Thiruda"	Sriram Parasuram	Palani Bharathi	Sujatha
2002	I Love You Da	"Yetho Yetho Ennil"	Bharadwaj	Snehan	Josh Neelam
2002	Kadhal Virus	"Vaan Nila"	A. R. Rahman	Vaali	Karthik
2003	Kalatpadai	"Mazhaiyo Puyalo"	Bharadwaj	Kamakodiyan	Shalini Singh, Gopika Poornima
2003	Vaseegara	"Nenjam Oru Murai"	S. A. Rajkumar	Pa. Vijay	Mahalakshmi Iyer
2003	Pop Corn	"Naan Vachen Lesa"	Yuvan Shankar Raja	Vaali	Vasundhara Das
2003	Anbu Thollai	"Mundasukatti"	Soundaryan	Kamakodiyan	Srivardhini
2003	Kadhaludan	"Uchi Kilaiyile"	S. A. Rajkumar	Kalidasan	Sujatha, Rajakumaran
2003	Kadhaludan	"Ithuvarai Yarum"	S. A. Rajkumar	Kalidasan	Kalpana Raghavendar
2003	Military	"Ammamma"	Deva	Kalidasan	Sujatha
2003	Military	"Suriyane"	Deva	Na. Muthukumar	
2003	Military	"Therodum Veedhiyile"	Deva	Pa. Vijay	Anuradha Sriram
2003	Manasellam	"Ilaya Nadhi"	Ilaiyaraaja	Vaali	Sadhana Sargam
2003	Jay Jay	"Kadhal Mazhaiye"	Bharadwaj	Vairamuthu	
2003	Pavalakkodi	"Kannaal Parthathum"	Sirpy	Kabilan	
2003	Sena	"Ennodu Vantha"	D. Imman	Bharathiputhran	
2003	Punnagai Poove	"Oru Poonkili"	Yuvan Shankar Raja	Arivumathi	Prasanna
2003	Anbe Anbe	"Rettai Jadai Rakamma"	Bharadwaj	Kalaikumar	T. L. Maharajan, Manikka Vinayagam, Swarnalatha, Manorama
2004	Oru Murai Sollividu	"Enna Kichu Kichu"	Bharadwaj		Lavanya Sundararaman
2004	Senthalam Poove	"Kadhal Kadhal Ena"	Vimalraj		Swarnalatha
2004	Desam (D)	"Mazhai Mega Vanna"	A. R. Rahman	Vairamuthu	K. S. Chithra
2005	Aaru	"Nenjam Enum"	Devi Sri Prasad	Na. Muthukumar	Kalpana
2005	Ullam Ketkumae	"Ennai Panthada"	Harris Jayaraj	Thamarai	Srimathumitha
2005	Andha Naal Nyabagam	"Oru Siragu Nee"	Harris Jayaraj	Bharadwaj	
2005	Gurudeva	"Azhage Azhage"	Sabesh-Murali		
2006	Vettaiyaadu Vilaiyaadu	"Uyirile"	Vairamuthu	Mahalakshmi Iyer	
2008	Jodhaa Akbar (D)	Muzhumathy"	Vairamuthu	A. R. Rahman	
2009	Ananda Thandavam	"Poovinai"	Vairamuthu	G. V. Prakash Kumar	Shreya Ghoshal

==== 2010s ====
Year	Film	Song	Composer(s)	Writer(s)	Co-artist(s)
2010	Bale Pandiya	"Happy"	Devan Ekambaram	Vaali	Various
2011	Ayudha Porattam	"Iniyavale, Iniyavale"	Nandhan Raj	Thamizh Amudhan	
2013	Moodar Koodam	“Kannodu Kangal”	Natarajan Sankaran	Naveen	
2014	Kochadaiiyaan	"Idhayam"	A. R. Rahman	Vairamuthu	Chinmayi
2014	Naan Than Bala	"Uyire Unakkaga"	Venkat Krishi	Na. Muthukumar	Priyadarshini
2014	Lingaa	"En Manavaa"	A. R. Rahman	Vairamuthu	Aditi Paul
2015	Thilagar	"Aanai Koottam"	Kannan		
2021	Galatta Kalyaanam	"Idhudhaan En Kadhai"	A. R. Rahman	Kabilan	

== Telugu songs ==
=== 1990s ===
Year	Film	Song	Composer(s)	Writer(s)	Co-artist(s)
1993	Donga Donga	"Etilona Chepalanta"	A. R. Rahman		
1993	Gentleman	"Maavele Maavelee"	A. R. Rahman		
1994	Donga Rascal	"Oo Saaritu Raava"	Vidyasagar		K. S. Chithra
1994	Palnati Pourusham	"O Sikku Paapa"	A. R. Rahman		
1995	Bombay	"Poolakundhi"	A. R. Rahman		
1995	Bombay	"Idi Maathru Bhoomi"	A. R. Rahman		K. S. Chithra, Shankar Mahadevan
1995	Bombay	"Kulamela Mathamela"	A. R. Rahman		
1995	Vaddu Bava Thappu	"Hello Hello Sreevaaru"	Vidyasagar		K. S. Chithra
1996	Prema Desham	"Hello Doctor Heart"	A. R. Rahman		
1996	Mr. Romeo	"Evaridhee"	A. R. Rahman		
1997	Merupu Kalalu	"Ohh La La La"	A. R. Rahman		K. S. Chithra, Unni Menon
1997	Hello I Love You	"Dhaa Dhaa Dhaa"	Shashi Preetam		
1998	Aayanagaru	"Paluke Bangarameyenura"	Vidyasagar		Swarnalatha
1998	Jeans	"Priya Priya"	A. R. Rahman		
1998	Jeans	"Gundelloo"	A. R. Rahman		
1998	Pelli Peetalu	"Jill Jill Jill"(Duet)	S. V. Krishna Reddy		K. S. Chithra
1998	Pelli Peetalu	"Chita Pata"	S. V. Krishna Reddy		K. S. Chithra
1998	Prematho	"Ooristhu Ooguthuu"	A. R. Rahman		
1998	Aahaa	"Manasaina Naa Priya"	Vandemataram Srinivas		
1999	Jodi	"Nanu Preminchananu"	A. R. Rahman		Sujatha Mohan
1999	Oke Okkadu	"Eruvaaka Saaguthundaga"	A. R. Rahman		Swarnalatha
1999	Veedu Samanyudu Kaadhu	"Kommala Dhaagina"	Vidyasagar		Sujatha Mohan
1999	Kadhalar Dhinam - Telugu (D)	"Manasu Padi"	A. R. Rahman		M. G. Sreekumar

=== 2000s ===
Year	Film	Song	Composer(s)	Writer(s)	Co-artist(s)
2000	Madhuri	"Sannaga O Pilupu"	Murali		Sujatha Mohan
2000	Manoharam	"Bharatha Maata"	Mani Sharma		K. S. Chithra
2000	Nagulamma	"Jilibili Thara Prema"	Dhina		K. S. Chithra
2000	Premani Cheppara	"Adhe Vennela"	Rajesh Roshan		
2000	Premani Cheppara	"Nidhurinche Gundela"	Rajesh Roshan		
2000	Priyuralu Pilichindi	"Yemaaye Naa Kavitha"	A. R. Rahman		K. S. Chithra
2000	Sakhi	"Vasanthapu Puvvulam"	A. R. Rahman		
2000	Sakhi	"Snehituda"	A. R. Rahman		
2001	Cheli	"Varshinche Megham"	Harris Jayaraj		
2001	Prematho Raa	"Premincha"	Mani Sharma		
2001	Chiranjeevulu	"Anuraagam Anubandham"	A. B. Murali		K. S. Chithra
2001	Chiranjeevulu	"Palle Pachanee"	A. B. Murali		
2001	Chocolate	"Oh Priya Oh Priya"	Deva		
2001	Hanuman Junction	"Konaseemallo O Koyila"	Suresh Peters		K. S. Chithra
2001	Kushi	"Cheliyaa Cheliyaa"	Mani Sharma		
2002	Allari	"Nara Naram"	Paul J		
2002	Baba	"Baba Theme"	A. R. Rahman		
2002	Brahmachari	"Gadothkaja"	Deva		
2002	Brahmachari	"Sakalakala Vallabhuda"	Deva		
2002	I Love You Raa	"Oh Priya"	Bharadwaj		
2002	Kanulu Moosina Neevaye	"Aapalanna Aagena"	Chakri		
2002	Memu	"Nayanamutho Modalai"	Raghu Kaushik		
2002	Muddhu	"Mallello Mallello"	A B Murali		K. S. Chithra
2002	Nenu Ninnu Premisthunna	"Hai Rama"	Shashi Preetam		
2002	Panchatantram	"Meri Jaan Meri Jaan"	Deva		
2002	Premaku Swagatam	"Kohinooru Diamond"	S. V. Krishna Reddy		
2002	Ramana	"Raayanchala Raave"	Maharishi		
2002	Rendu Gundela Chappudu	"Neeetho Nuvu Poti"	Aakash		
2002	Roja Poolu	"Subbamma Subbamma"	Bharadwaj		
2004	Gharshana	"Ye Chilipi"	Harris Jayaraj		
2005	Ekkadikelthundho Manasu	"Paruvala Nee Paita"	Raj Deep		K. S. Chithra
2006	Raghavan	"Hrudayame"	Harris Jayaraj		
2006	Bommarillu	"Bommane Geesthe"	Devi Sri Prasad		
2006	Vesavi	"Urekene Manasane"	G. V. Prakash Kumar		
2006	Pournami	"Bhavamaiyna"	Devi Sri Prasad	Sirivennela Sitaramasastri	Jaidev, Punya Srinivas
2007	Tinnama Padukunnama Tellarinda	"Konchem Konge"	M. M. Srilekha		
2008	Jodhaa Akbar	"Aamani Ruthuvu"	A. R. Rahman		
2008	Aadi Vishnu	"Eedu Rangula"	M. M. Srilekha		
2009	Ananda Thandavam	"Poovunai"	G. V. Prakash Kumar		
2009	Sontha Ooru	"Kanula Vaakite"	Saketh		

=== 2010s ===
Year	Film	Song	Composer(s)	Writer(s)	Co-artist(s)
2010	Pappu	"Mellaga O"	Phani Kalyan		Radhika
2010	Maa Annayya Bangaram	"Inti Maharani"	S. A. Rajkumar		Srividhya, Manasa, Murali
2014	Lingaa (D)	"Chinna Chinna"	A. R. Rahman		Aditi Paul
2014	Premalayam (D)	"Chalunaya"	A. R. Rahman		Bela Shende
2015	Anekudu (D)	"Yegise Nadhi"	Harris Jayaraj		Shakthisree Gopalan

== Kannada songs ==
Year	Film	Song	Composer(s)	Writer(s)	Co-artist(s)
1997	Mangalasutra	Nanna Usire Jo Laali	Vidyasagar		Chithra
1998	Yaare Neenu Cheluve	Dayaana Dayaana	Hamsalekha	Hamsalekha	Anuradha Sriram
1998	Yaare Neenu Cheluve	Kushalave Kshemave	Hamsalekha	Hamsalekha	Anuradha Sriram
2000	Yare Nee Abhimani	"Yaare Nee Abhimani"	Hamsalekha	Hamsalekha	K. S. Chithra
2001	Hoo Anthiya Uhoo Anthiya	"Chandada Chandani"	Karthik Raja	Doddarangegowda	Sujatha Mohan
2003	Khushi	Dinavella Hasivilla	Gurukiran	V. Nagendra Prasad	K. S. Chithra
2004	Maurya	Usiraguve Hasiraguve"	Gurukiran	K. Kalyan	Shreya Ghoshal
2004	Malla	"Yammo Yammo"	V. Ravichandran		Anuradha Sriram
2005	Nammanna	Olave Kale	Gurukiran	Kaviraj	K. S. Chithra
2006	Neelakanta	Hennige Seere Yaake Anda	V. Ravichandran		Suma Shastry
2007	Bhoopathi	"Chandrana Thangi"	V. Harikrishna	V. Nagendra Prasad	K. S. Chithra
2007	Santha	"Naguvirali (Male)"	Gurukiran	V. Manohar	
2007	No 73, Shanthi Nivasa	Hrudaya Hrudaya	Bharadwaj	V. Nagendra Prasad	
2008	Chaitrada Chandrama	O Jeevada Gelathi	S. Narayan		
2008	Sajni	'Ondu Sulladaru (Duet version)	A. R. Rahman	J. M. Prahlad	Sujatha Mohan
2008	Sajni	'Ondu Sulladaru (Solo version)	A. R. Rahman	J. M. Prahlad	
2009	Rajakumari	Yaar Yaarammi	V. Harikrishna		
2009	Gulama	Snehitane Snehitane	Gurukiran	Tushar Ranganath	K. S. Chithra
2010	Naariya Seere Kadda	Neere Neere Panneere	V. Ravichandran		Anuradha Sriram
2010	Hoo	Nee Hanga Nodabeda	V. Ravichandran	V. Ravichandran	Anuradha Sriram
2010	Modalasala	Prathama	V. Harikrishna	Sunitha	
2017	Anjani Putra	Anjani Putra Title Track	Ravi Basrur	Kinnai Raj	Ravi Basrur, Mohan

== Malayalam songs ==
Year	Film	Song	Composer(s)	Lyricist	Co-artist(s)
1995	Sindoora Rekha	"Ente Sindhoorarekhayilengo"	Sharreth	Kaithapram	Sujatha
1995	Thacholi Varghese Chekavar	"Veeralippattin"	Sharreth	Gireesh Puthenchery	Sharreth
1997	Mayaponman	"Chandanathil Gandha"	Mohan Sithara	S. Ramesan Nair	
1998	Summer in Bethlehem	"Ethrayo Janmamay"	Vidyasagar	Gireesh Puthenchery	Sujatha
1998	Summer in Bethlehem	"Marivillin Gopurangal"	Vidyasagar	Gireesh Puthenchery	Biju Narayanan
1998	Oru Maravathoor Kanavu	"Thaarakkoottam"	Vidyasagar	Gireesh Puthenchery	M. G. Sreekumar, G. Venugopal
1998	Pranayavarnangal	"Aalelo Pulelo"	Vidyasagar	Sachidanandan Puzhankara	V. Devanand, Harish Raghavendra
1999	Gaandhiyan	"Raghupati Raghava"	Nadirshah	Gireesh Puthenchery	M. G. Sreekumar, Salim, Baby Rinsy
1999	My Dear Karadi	"Maadapraave"	Thankaraj	Balu Kiriyath	
1999	Ustaad	"Vennilakombile"	Vidyasagar	Gireesh Puthenchery	Sujatha
1999	Ustaad	"Chandramukhi Naadithan"	Vidyasagar	Gireesh Puthenchery	M. G. Sreekumar, Sujatha, Radhika Thilak
1999	Megham	"Kodijanmangalaay"	Ouseppachan	Gireesh Puthenchery	K. S. Chithra, M. G. Sreekumar
1999	Vazhunnor	"Mathimukhi"	Ouseppachan	Gireesh Puthenchery	K. S. Chithra
1999	Ezhupunna Tharakan	"Melevinninmuttathare"	Vidyasagar	Gireesh Puthenchery	
1999	Aayiram Meni	"Maanathampili"	S. P. Venkatesh	Gireesh Puthenchery	M. G. Sreekumar, Sujatha, Prabhakar
1999	Aayiram Meni	"Nadi Nadi"	S. P. Venkatesh	Sujatha	
1999	Mazhavillu	"Pullimaan Kidave"	Mohan Sithara	Kaithapram	K. S. Chithra
1999	Janani	"Niramaaya Nee Varavayi"	Ouseppachan	Kavalam Narayana Panicker	
1999	Devadasi	"Dil E Naadan"	Sharreth	S. Rameshan Nair	
1999	Keralam Manoharam	"Prasada Sindhooram"	J. M. Raju	Gireesh Puthenchery	
2000	Snehapoorvam Anna	"Ormayil"	Raju Singh	Shibu Chakravarthy	
2000	Snehapoorvam Anna	"Maaleyam Maarilezhum"	Raju Singh	Shibu Chakravarthy	K. S. Chithra
2000	Cover Story	"Manjilpookum"	Sharreth	Gireesh Puthenchery	K. S. Chithra
2000	Millennium Stars	"Maha Ganapatim"	Vidyasagar	Tahir Faraz	K. J. Yesudas, Hariharan, Vijay Yesudas
2000	Nadanpennum Naattupramaaniyum	"Aalolam Ponnoonjalaadi"	A. B. Murali	S. Ramesan Nair	
2000	Darling Darling	"Muthu Pavizhavum"	Ouseppachan	S. Ramesan Nair	Sujatha
2001	Aparanmaar Nagarathil	"Nimishadalangalil"	K. Sanan Nair	Shahjahan	
2001	Dhosth	"Manju Pole"	Vidyasagar	S. Ramesan Nair	
2001	One Man Show	"Oru Mulam"	Suresh Peters	Kaithapram	
2001	Red Indians	"Kannadippuzha Paadi"	S. P. Venkatesh	Gireesh Puthenchery	
2001	Dubai	"Oru Pattin"	Vidyasagar	Gireesh Puthenchery	Sujatha, Nikhil Menon
2001	Vakkalath Narayanan Kutty	"Kulambadichum"	Mohan Sithara	Gireesh Puthenchery	
2002	Malayali Mamanu Vanakkam	"Kanmaniye"	Suresh Peters	S. Ramesan Nair	K. S. Chithra
2002	Mazhathullikilukkam	"Velippeninu"	Suresh Peters	S. Ramesan Nair	Sujatha
2002	Chirikkudukka	"Poo Viriyumee"	Vinu Kiriyath	Gireesh Puthenchery	
2003	Mazhanoolkkanavu	"Etho Chaitra Varnangal"	Thej Mervin	Kaithapram	K. S. Chithra
2003	Swapnakkoodu	"Oru Poomathram"	Mohan Sithara	Kaithapram	Sujatha
2003	Mizhirandilum	"Vaarmazhaville"	Raveendran	Vayalar Sarath Chandra Varma	
2003	Ivar	"Ore Swaram"	Srinivas	B. R. Prasad	Karthik, Srilekha Parthasarathy
2004	Aparichithan	"Kanavukalin"	Suresh Peters	Gireesh Puthenchery	
2004	Aparichithan	"Pranaya"	Suresh Peters	Gireesh Puthenchery	Sujatha
2004	Aparichithan	"Manassukal"	Suresh Peters	Gireesh Puthenchery	Sheela
2004	Koottu	"En Priye"	Mohan Sithara	Indira Namboothiri	
2004	Thekkekkara Superfast	"Murali Kayyilenthi"	Ouseppachan	Gireesh Puthenchery	
2004	Priyam Priyamkaram	"Iniyee Poonkurunnilo"	Prakash Ullyeri	Sijil Kodungalloor	
2005	Iruvattam Manavaatti	"Veenayaakumo"	Alphonse Joseph	B. R. Prasad	Sujatha
2005	Iruvattam Manavaatti	"Gaanamaanu Njan"	Alphonse Joseph	B. R. Prasad	Sujatha
2005	Izhra	"Mai Mai Maina"	D. Imman	Kaithapram	Sujatha
2005	Thaskaraveeran	"Arithirimulle"	Ouseppachan	ONV Kurup	Balu, Kalyani
2006	Lanka	"Innoru Naal"	Srinivas	B. R. Prasad	Sujatha
2006	Lanka	"Kadalezhum"	Srinivas	B. R. Prasad	
2006	Narakasuran	"Priye Nin Chundil"	Manish	Bharanikkavu Sivakumar	Sujatha
2006	Ennittum	"Oru Noorashakal"	Jassie Gift	Kaithapram	K. S. Chithra
2007	November Rain	"Aarumaarum"	Anup S. Nair	Brajesh Ramachandran, Sachithanandan Puzhankara, Suresh	Jyotsna
2007	Veeralipattu	"Shararanthalinnu"	Vishwajith	Prasad Pisharody	
2008	Cycle	"Pattunarnnuvo"	Mejo Joseph	Anil Panachooran	K. S. Chithra
2008	Mayabazar	"Mizhiyil Mizhiyil"	Rahul Raj		Sujatha Mohan, Rahul Raj
2009	Meghatheertham	"Kanneerumaay"	Sharreth		
2012	Achante Aanmakkal	"Manassoru"	Jassie Gift		Sujatha Mohan
2019	Finals	"Manjukaalam"	Kailas Menon		
2019	Oru Nakshathramulla Aakasam	"Paravayaay"	Rahul Raj		
2022	Hridayam	"Sarvam Sadha"	Hesham Abdul Wahab	Arun Alat	

== Hindi songs ==
Year	Film	Song	Composer(s)	Writer(s)	Co-artist(s)
1998	Earth	"Yeh Jo Zindagi Hain"	A. R. Rahman	Javed Akhtar	Sujata Trivedi
1998	Earth	"Yeh Jo Zindagi Hain"	A. R. Rahman		Sukhwinder Singh
2000	Kadhalar Dhinam - Hindi (D)	"Dola Dola (Imtihan Hum Pyar Ka Deke)"	A. R. Rahman	Mehboob Kotwal	Swarnalatha
2000	Kadhalar Dhinam - Hindi (D)	"Sawar Gayee"	A. R. Rahman	Mehboob Kotwal	Udit Narayan
2000	Fiza	Piya Haji Ali"	A. R. Rahman	Shaukat Ali	Kadar Ghulam Mushtafa, Murtaza Ghulam Mushtafa
2001	Lagaan	"Mitwa"	A. R. Rahman	Javed Akhtar	Udit Narayan, Sukhwinder Singh, Alka Yagnik
2001	Lagaan	"Chale Chalo"	A. R. Rahman		A. R. Rahman, Chorus
2001	One 2 Ka 4	"Allay Allay"	A. R. Rahman	Majrooh Sultanpuri	Shaan, Sukhwinder Singh
2001	Dil Chahta Hai	"Kaisi Hai Yeh"	Shankar-Ehsaan-Loy	Javed Akhtar	
2004	Phir Milenge	Khushiyon Ki Koshish"	Shankar-Ehsaan-Loy	Prasoon Joshi	Mahalakshmi Iyer
2008	Yuvvraaj	Shanno Shanno"	A. R. Rahman		Karthik, Sonu Nigam, Timmy, Sunaina, Vivienne Pocha, Tina, Blaaze
2008	Yuvvraaj	Shanno Shanno" (remix by Krishna Chetan)	A. R. Rahman		Karthik, Sonu Nigam, Timmy, Sunaina, Vivienne Pocha, Tina, Blaaze
2009	Delhi-6	"Hey Kaala Bandar"	A. R. Rahman	Prasoon Joshi	Karthik, Naresh Iyer, Bonnie Chakraborty, Ember
2010	Robot (D)	"O Naye Insaan"	A. R. Rahman	Swanand Kirkire	A. R. Rahman, Khatija Rahman

== Serial songs ==
Year	Series	Song	Composer(s)	Writer(s)	Co-artist(s)
2001	Jee Boom Ba	"Jee Boom Ba"	Dhina		
2001	Sthreejanmam	"Shaleenathe Aromale"	Aji Sarasu		
2002	Mangalyam	"Mangalyam"	Bala Bharathi		
2003	Adugiran Kannan	"Aayiram Sooriyan"	C. Sathya		
2005	Dheerga Sumangali	"Dheerga Sumangali"	Bala Bharathi		
2006	Chellamadi Nee Enakku		Bala Bharathi		
