= Satya (soundtrack) =

Soundtrack album by Vishal Bhardwaj and film score by Sandeep Chowta

Satya: The Original Motion Picture Soundtrack

Soundtrack album by Vishal Bhardwaj
- Released: 3 April 1998
- Recorded: 1997–1998
- Genre: Feature film soundtrack
- Length: 27:59
- Language: Hindi
- Label: Venus Worldwide Entertainment
- Producer: Vishal Bhardwaj

Vishal Bhardwaj chronology
Chachi 420 (1997)	Satya: The Original Motion Picture Soundtrack (1998)	Daya (1998)

Satya: The Sound

Film score by Sandeep Chowta
- Released: 13 November 1998
- Recorded: 1997–1998
- Genre: Feature film soundtrack
- Length: 27:59
- Language: Hindi
- Label: Venus Worldwide Entertainment
- Producer: Sandeep Chowta

Sandeep Chowta chronology
Chandralekha (1998)	Satya: The Sound (1998)	Shanti Shanti Shanti (1998)

Satya: The Original Motion Picture Soundtrack is the soundtrack accompanying the 1998 film Satya directed and produced by Ram Gopal Varma and stars J. D. Chakravarthy, Urmila Matondkar and Manoj Bajpayee, alongside Saurabh Shukla, Aditya Shrivastava and Paresh Rawal. The soundtrack featured six songs composed by Vishal Bhardwaj and written by Gulzar and released on 3 April 1998 under the Venus Worldwide Entertainment label. Satya: The Sound, the second album featuring the original score composed by Sandeep Chowta was released on 13 November 1998 to acclaim and being considered as one of the finest film scores.

== Background ==
Vishal Bhardwaj composed the six-song soundtrack with lyrics written by Gulzar; it was their second collaboration after Maachis (1996). Bhardwaj recalled that Varma did not want the songs to make his film "impure" and found it challenging to blend the music with the narrative. Since the film had excessive violence Varma told him that he "wanted to balm it with soothing melodies".

The first song he composed for the film was "Badalon Se". As Varma liked it, he wanted a similar kind of music, which led him to compose "Geela Ghela Pani" and "Goli Maar (Kallu Mama)". Later, he also wanted a dance number to which he composed "Sapne Mein", the track was initially composed for Maachis but later replaced with "Chappa Chappa".

Bhardwaj had written temporary lyrics for "Goli Maar (Kallu Mama)" which goes like: "Gham ke neeche bamb laga ke rum udaa de" (transl. Put a bomb under the grief and blow up the room). While Gulzar complimented the tune, he was unimpressed on the lyrics terming it as "rubbish". He rewrote the lyrics for the song which Varma rejected twice. As he did not want to disappoint Gulzar, Varma insisted on screenwriter Anurag Kashyap to convince Gulzar on using Bhardwaj's lyrics, who adamantly refused it. Varma refused on picturizing the song in Gulzar's lyrics and told Bhardwaj to convince Gulzar. Bhardwaj who did not want to betray Gulzar, insisted him to record the song with Gulzar's version after Manoj Bajpayee and other crew members persuaded him.

== Release ==
Satya: The Original Motion Picture Soundtrack was released by Venus Worldwide Entertainment on 3 April 1998. The film's 23-track background score was released as a separate album, Satya: The Sound, in cassettes on 13 November 1998. It was the first instance in Indian cinema, where the background score was released for commercial purposes and unlike most film scores which include dialogues, the album consisted of instrumental sounds used in the background.

== Reception ==
Bhasker Gupta in his review for AllMusic wrote "Though not a milestone that remained in the public consciousness across many years to follow, it definitely features unconventional music that's both mainstream and imaginative." An article in The Hindu on the art of film scoring mentioned Satya: "Interestingly (and hopefully) Indian films are just making a start with original soundtracks: Sandeep Chowta's background score for Ram Gopal Varma's 'Satya'". According to Rediff.com, Satya "set the standards for background score" and the film's throbbing score "took the audience inside the mind of its characters. Every time a bullet was shot or there were close-ups of actors, one could hear the haunting score, which had a hallucinatory effect on the audience."

== Post-release ==
Bhardwaj named his studio as Satya Studio after the film's release. Chowta won the award for Best Background Score at the 44th Filmfare Awards.

== Track listing ==
Satya: The Original Motion Picture Soundtrack
No.	Title	Singer(s)	Length
1.	"Badalon Se"	Bhupinder Singh	6:06
2.	"Tu Mere Paas Bhi Hai"	Lata Mangeshkar, Hariharan	5:42
3.	"The Mood of Satya"	Instrumental	2:20
4.	"Goli Maar"	Mano	4:43
5.	"Geela Geela Pani"	Lata Mangeshkar	6:05
6.	"Sapne Mein"	Asha Bhosle, Suresh Wadkar	5:23
Total length:			27:59

Satya: The Sound
No.	Title	Length
1.	"Birth of a Tragedy (Satya arrives)"	2:10
2.	"Deep Shave (Satya slashes Pakya)"	1:02
3.	"Hit And Run (Producer's killing)"	2:01
4.	"Deathly Friendships (Bhiku meets Satya)"	2:39
5.	"Home Coming (Pals at ease)"	3:08
6.	"Passing The Exam (Jagga's killing)"	2:01
7.	"Hide And Seek (Construction shootout)"	2:24
8.	"Warmth in Cold Blood (Vidya through the window)"	2:15
9.	"Educating Ronusagar (Music director gets a call)"	3:14
10.	"Damn The Cell Phone (Attempt on Gurunarain)"	1:09
11.	"Need To Be Alive (Meeting Bhau)"	1:35
12.	"Why Listen To Bhau? (Killing Gurunarain)"	5:59
13.	"Vidya's Gift (Gang goes shopping)"	3:04
14.	"Man in the Family (Father's death)"	3:22
15.	"Ask Him To Come Here (Bhau's patch-up)"	1:26
16.	"Please Clean The City (Encounter killings)"	2:01
17.	"He Has To Go (Commissioner's killing)"	3:24
18.	"Triumph And Tragedy (Theatre sequence)"	3:18
19.	"I Can't Take It Anymore (Bhiku shows the way)"	4:28
20.	"Bhau's Choice (Bhiku's death)"	1:54
21.	"Who Is Satya? (Vidya knows)"	2:00
22.	"Even God Couldn't Help (Bhau's killing)"	3:18
23.	"Death of a Truth (The end)"	8:31
Total length:		1:06:23
