= Mr. Duplicate =

- Directed by: Kodlu Ramakrishna
- Written by: Raghav Dwarki
- Based on: Minnale (Tamil)
- Produced by: Kashyap Dakoju
- Starring: Diganth; Prajwal Devaraj; Sheetal Injudhan Khan
- Cinematography: Naveen Suvarna
- Edited by: Shivu
- Music by: Mano Murthy
- Distributed by: Real Wealth Venture Productions
- Release date: 29 July 2011
- Country: India
- Language: Kannada

Mr. Duplicate is a 2011 Indian Kannada film in the romance genre starring Diganth and Prajwal Devaraj in the lead roles. Sheetal Injudhan Khan, a newcomer is the main female lead. The film is directed by veteran Kodlu Ramakrishna. Mano Murthy is the music director of the film. Kashyap Dakoju has produced the film under the banner Real Wealth venture productions. The film is a remake of 2001 Tamil film Minnale starring R. Madhavan, Abbas and Reema Sen.

== Plot ==
Nandu, has lost 114 jobs but leads a happy, lazy life, thanks to his doting father Devraj. Vikram, on the other hand, is a busy businessman who hardly has time for anything else.

After a communication goof-up, Vikram misses his very first visit to meet the girl whom his parents want him to marry. Meanwhile, Nandu who falls in love with the same girl impersonates Vikram to win her. Finally when Nandu and Vikram meet, they realize that they are old foes from their college days.

== Cast ==
- Diganth as Vikram "Vicky" Raj
- Prajwal Devaraj as Nandakumar
- Sheetal Injudhan Khan as Poornima
- Devaraj as Ramu
- Ramesh Bhat as Vicky's father
- Swasthik Shankar
- Anand (credited as Silli Lalli Anand) as Venkatesh "Venky"
- Karisubbu
- Mysore Prabhakar
- Tulasi
- Sudha Belawadi as Souparnika, Vicky's mother
- Chandrakala Mohan

== Music ==
Mr. Duplicate

Soundtrack album by Manikanth Kadri
- Released: 2011
- Recorded: 2011
- Genre: Feature film soundtrack
- Length: 19:58
- Language: Kannada

Official audio
- Mr. Duplicate - Full Album on YouTube

Track listing
| No. | Title | Singer(s) | Length |
|---|---|---|---|
| 1. | "Ninnanne Nodutha" | Sonu Nigam, Shreya Ghoshal | 4:16 |
| 2. | "Minchi Maayavaguve" | Chetan Sosca, V. S. Manasa | 3:48 |
| 3. | "Naanna Naanna" | Nanditha | 4:15 |
| 4. | "Naane Hero" | Hemanth, Chetan Sosca | 4:36 |
| 5. | "Haage Summane" | Rajesh Krishnan, Ritisha Padmanabhan | 3:43 |
| Total length: | | | 19:58 |

== Reception ==
=== Critical response ===
A critic from Bangalore Mirror wrote "The film is not bad per se, but it brutally exposes the makers’ lack of creativity despite having a dazzling star cast. It's getting clear that most directors can't take Sandalwood forward". A critic from News18 India wrote "All the veteran actors like Ramesh Bhat, Thulasi and Sudha Belawadi have aptly fitted into their respective roles. 'Mr. Duplicate' is no match for 'Minnale' but it is good for a one-time watch". Sunayana Suresh from DNA wrote "Newcomer Sheetal shows promise and has a certain yesteryear heroine charm to her face. Mano Murthy’s music is melodious and reminds you of the retro Kannada songs of the 70s and 80s and the dialogues and cinematography are quite impressive". A critic from The Times of India scored the film at 3.5 out of 5 stars and wrote "Prajwal is impressive with his mature acting, Diganth is simply superb, Sheetal plays her role very well, Ramesh Bhat and Devaraj are gracious. The music composer Mano Murthy has come up with some catchy tunes".
