= Appu and Pappu =

- VCD cover
- Directed by: R Anantharaju
- Produced by: Soundarya Jagadish R
- Starring: Snehith; Judi; Abbas; Rekha Vedavyas
- Cinematography: S Krishna
- Edited by: Sanath Suresh
- Music by: Hamsalekha
- Release date: 17 September 2010
- Country: India
- Language: Kannada

Appu and Pappu (alternatively titled Appu Pappu) is a 2010 Indian Kannada-language film directed by R Anantharaju, starring Snehith and an orangutan named Judi in the titular roles with Abbas and Rekha Vedavyas in important roles. This is the first Kannada film to feature an orangutan in a major role and is loosely based on the English film Dunston Checks In (1996). The story follows with a single-mothered child Appu, who wants to unite his mother with his father, who is living in Cambodia

It was released on 17 September 2010. Appu and Pappu became a surprise success and ran for 100 days at the box-office. The film was dubbed in Tamil as Appu Pappu. In Hindi it was dubbed as Lo Aagaye Appu Pappu. The film marked comeback of Abbas to Kannada cinema in a major role after Shanti Shanti Shanti (1998).

== Plot ==
Appu is a naughty boy, living with his single mother Deepa and maternal grandfather in Bangalore. He often makes trouble and drags his entire family into the situation. One day Appu asks his grandfather about his. He explain him the story that, his father Ramesh (Abbas) had love marriage with his mother. After Appu's birth, both used to fight every-day deciding whether to give Appu a luxurious life or a sufficient life. The fight leads to divorce.

Deepa leaves for Cambodia for her office work along with Appu.

== Cast ==
- Snehith as Appu
- Judi as Pappu
- Abbas as Ramesh
- Rekha Vedavyas as Deepa
- Komal as Anthony
- Rangayana Raghu as Jogi Chan (formerly Fakirappa)
- Raju Talikote
- Madhuri Itagi as Rita
- Vijay Kumar as Appu's grandfather and Deepa's father
- Gym Ravi as Henchman
- Gym Harish as Henchman
- Prem Kumar as Prasad (uncredited)
- Jennifer Kotwal in a special appearance as Sanjana

== Production ==
The film was shot in Cambodia.

== Music ==
The music of the film is composed by Hamsalekha. The makers of the film wanted Amitabh Bachchan to sing a song for the orangutan.

Appu And Pappu

Soundtrack album by Hamsalekha
- Released: 2010
- Recorded: 2010
- Genre: Feature film soundtrack
- Length: 24:54
- Language: Kannada

Official audio
- Appu And Pappu - Full Album on YouTube

Track listing
No.	Title	Singer(s)	Length
1.	"Anjani"	Shankar Mahadevan	6:16
2.	"Hee Appu"	Rajesh Krishnan, Anuradha Sriram	4:50
3.	"Makkaligaagi"	Sonu Nigam	5:08
4.	"Area Namma"	Sachin, Govindusha Subramanya	4:50
5.	"Appa Appa"	S. P. Balasubrahmanyam	4:31
Total length:			24:55

== Reception ==
=== Critical response ===
Shruti Indira Lakshminarayana from Rediff.com scored the film at 2.5 out of 5 stars and says "This being a children's film, the violent sequence could have been avoided. Certain provocative scenes involving the second lead heroine could also have been easily given a skip. Appu Pappu speaks of the importance of family values and ties on one hand, and animal welfare and protection on the other. A good outing for the kids". B. S. Srivani from Deccan Herald wrote "However, “Appu Pappu” is meant mainly for the kids, and their doting parents. When each trick, twist and turn featuring the human-animal duo gets seetis and loud applause, it is time to suspend logic and enjoy the show. “Appu Pappu” entertains as only it can". A critic from The Times of India scored the film at 3.5 out of 5 stars and wrote "Rekha excels with her graceful performance. Master Snehith promises to be a "little star" of the future. Komal is simply superb. Rangayana Raghu keeps you in good humour. Raju Thalikote, Abbas and Jennifer Kotwal have done justice to their roles. It is finally the orangutan that steals the show with a good performance. "Mungaru Male" Krishna is at his best in cinematography. Hamsalekha has given some excellent musical numbers".

== Box office ==
The film was a surprise box office success and ran for a hundred days.
