= Swetha Naagu =

2004 film

- Directed by: Sanjeevi
- Produced by: CV Reddy
- Starring: Soundarya
- Cinematography: Diwakar
- Edited by: Lanka Bhaskar
- Music by: Koti
- Production company: CV Arts
- Release date: 18 February 2004
- Running time: 145 minutes (Telugu); 123 minutes (Kannada)
- Country: India
- Languages: Telugu; Kannada

Swetha Naagu is a 2004 Indian devotional horror film directed by Sanjeevi starring Soundarya with Abbas and Sarath Babu playing supporting roles. The film was shot simultaneously in Telugu and Kannada with the latter version titled Shwetha Naagara. Both versions had a slightly different supporting cast. The Telugu version was partially reshot and dubbed in Tamil as Madhumathi. It is the last film for Soundarya before her death on 17 April 2004.

== Cast ==
Cast (Telugu)	Cast (Kannada)	Role (Telugu)	Role (Kannada)
Soundarya		Madhumathi	Madhumathi
Abbas		Praveen	Praveen
Sarath Babu		Shankar Reddy	Shankar Reddy
Jaya Prakash Reddy		Sarpararanya Dhora	Sarpa Kaadu Dhorey
Abhinayashree		Naagini	Naagini
Dharmavarapu Subramanyam	Dwarakish	Ashok Kumar	Ashok Kumar
Mallikarjuna Rao	Kunigal Nagabhushan	Madhumathi's guardian	Madhumathi's guardian
Sangeeta	Sridevi	Madhumathi's mother	Madhumathi's mother
Raghunatha Reddy	Bank Janardhan	Praveen's father	Praveen's father
Brahmanandam	Sanketh Kashi	chief guest	chief guest
Karunas	Karibasavaiah	"Black" Baba	"Conductor" Kariyappa
Babloo Prithviraj		shapeshifting snake dancer (cameo)	shapeshifting snake dancer (cameo)
Anand		tribal man	tribal man
Cast (Telugu)		Role (Telugu)	
Pattabhi Ram		tribal man	tribal man
Kallu Chidambaram		tribal man	tribal man
Cast (Kannada)		Role (Kannada)	
Meena		Praveen's mother	Praveen's mother

== Production ==
The film was originally planned to be made simultaneously in Telugu and Tamil. Many resources state that this was Soundarya's 100th milestone film and also her last proper film while still alive; she died two months later during a helicopter crash. She had two posthumous releases in the later part of the year. A white snake from Meghalaya was used in the film. Abbas who garnered acclaim with his debut in the Tamil film, Kadhal Desam was signed to play one of the leads in the film. The film began production in mid-2003. The film was shot in Bangalore, Savanadurga alongside Yaana and Sirsi in Uttara Karnataka.

== Reception ==
Idlebrain gave the film a rating of two-and-three-quarters out of five and wrote that "Swetha Nagu is an average devotional film. And the USP (Unique Selling Point) is Soundarya". A critic from Sify noted that "The first half of the film is interesting, but the film peters out in the second half. However the plus point of the film is Soundarya".
