= Dominique Cerejo =

Indian female playback singer

- Occupation: Playback singer
- Instrument: Vocalist
- Years active: 1997–present
- Spouse: Clinton Cerejo

Dominique Cerejo is an Indian female playback singer best known for the song "Yeh Tumhari Meri Baatein" from Rock On!!. She has sung in over thirty bollywood soundtrack albums. She is married to Clinton Cerejo, who also works in the Indian music industry.

== Personal life ==
Dominique is married to Clinton Cerejo, who too, works as a singer primarily in Bollywood. They have two children.

== Career ==
Dominique used to frequently participate in the competitions held by the Church of her locality and took singing classes later on to get well trained. She also lent her voice to various advertisement jingles. Her first break came when Shankar Mahadevan, who worked with her while doing jingles, invited her to sing for the title track for the first album by Shankar–Ehsaan–Loy, Dus. Though the movie was shelved due to the death of the director Mukul Anand, she went on to sing many tracks for Shankar–Ehsaan–Loy and other major composers like A.R. Rahman, Vishal Bhardwaj and Pritam Chakraborty. Despite singing many albums post Dus, she didn't get noticed until her rendition of Yeh Tumhari Meri Baatein from Rock On!! as in most of the songs she used to sing chorus.

== Filmography ==
=== Hindi ===
- Zindagi Na Milegi Dobara
- Impatient Vivek
- Paanch
- Brides Wanted
- Isi Life Mein
- Once Upon A Time In Mumbaai - "I Am in Love" (Reprise), "I Am in Love" (dance version)
- Kuchh Kariye
- Tum Milo Toh Sahi
- Hum Tum Aur Ghost
- Pyaar Impossible
- De Dana Dan
- Wake Up Sid
- Teree Sang
- Billu
- Rock On!!
- Victoria No. 203
- Bow Barracks Forever
- Dhoom 2
- Bas Ek Pal
- Holiday
- Neal 'N' Nikki
- Dil Jo Bhi Kahey
- Kyun! Ho Gaya Na...
- Maqbool
- Kyon?
- Moksha: Salvation
- Grahan
- Badal
- Hum Dil De Chuke Sanam
- Mere Do Anmol Ratan
- Dus
- Rangoon

=== Tamil ===
- V. I. P. (1997 film)
- Kandukonden Kandukonden
- Kadhal Desam
- Alai Payuthey

=== Telugu ===
- Anukokunda Oka Roju
- Priyuralu Pilichindi
- Prema Desham

=== Malayalam ===
- Anarkali

=== English ===
- Pray for Me Brother

== Dubbing roles ==
=== Animated films ===
Film title	Original Voice	Character	Dub Language	Original Language	Original Year Release	Dub Year Release	Notes
Aladdin	Lea Salonga	Princess Jasmine (Singing)	Hindi	English	1992	1994	Dubbed by Modi Entertainment. Princess Jasmine's Hindi speaking voice was provided by Namrata Sawhney.

== Awards ==
=== Won ===
- Mirchi Music Awards for Upcoming Female Vocalist of The Year - "Yeh Tumhari Meri Baatein" - Rock On!! (2008)

=== Nominated ===
- Star Screen Award for Best Playback Singer - Female - "Yeh Tumhari Meri Baatein" - Rock On!! (2008)
- Stardust Award for New Musical Sensation - "Yeh Tumhari Meri Baatein" - Rock On!! (2008)
- Apsara Award for Best Female Playback Singer - "Yeh Tumhari Meri Baatein" - Rock On!! (2008)
