= Idi Sangathi =

2008 film directed by Krishnan Seshadri Gomatam

- Poster
- Directed by: Chandra Siddhartha
- Written by: Chandra Siddhartha
- Produced by: Yashvanth Valavala
- Starring: Abbas; Tabu
- Cinematography: Jaya Krishna Gummadi
- Music by: John Varki; Anup Rubens (score)
- Release date: 22 February 2008
- Running time: 128 minutes
- Country: India
- Language: Telugu

Idi Sangathi is a 2008 Indian Telugu-language drama film directed by Chandra Siddhartha. The film stars Tabu and Abbas in the lead roles with Raja in a cameo role. This film marks the second film in which they are paired together after the Tamil film Kadhal Desam (1996). The film is an adaptation of the novel Nuvve Kaadu.

== Cast ==
- Abbas as Satyamurthy
- Tabu as Swarajyalakshmi
- Sunil as Neeladri
- Kota Srinivasa Rao as Chief Minister
- Raghunatha Reddy as Police Officer
- Chalapathi Rao as DGP
- Hema
- Surya as Police Inspector
- M. S. Narayana
- L. B. Sriram
- Brahmaji
- Raja Ravindra
- Gautam Raju
- Shankar Melkote
- Devadas Kanakala
- Jenny
- Janardhan
- Apoorva
- Raja as Clover King (cameo appearance)
- Anita Hassanandani and Samiksha as item numbers

== Soundtrack ==
Idi Sangathi

Soundtrack album by John P. Varki
- Released: 2008
- Recorded: 2008
- Genre: Soundtrack
- Length: 17:30
- Label: Madhura Audio
- Producer: John. P. Varki

Music was composed by John P. Varki and was released on Madhura Audio.

Track List
No.	Title	Lyrics	Singer(s)	Length
1.	"Pattu Cheera Katti"	Chaitanya Prasad	Anuradha Sriram	4:53
2.	"Mela Mellaga Ra Ra"	Peddada Murthy	Suchitra, Sujith	4:37
3.	"Aateenu Ranitho"	Peddada Murthy	Suchitra, Tippu	4:55
4.	"Idhi Sangathi"	Chaitanya Prasad	Masterji	3:05
Total length:				17:30

== Critical reception ==
A critic from Rediff.com gave the film a two out of five stars stating that "Chandra Siddhartha has chosen a topical theme but fails in his depiction of it as the treatment is quite bland. Quite a disappointment, considering the good cast". A critic from Full Hyderabad wrote that "Idi Sangathi is one of those films that is unclear on whether to be full-fledged parallel cinema or proper commercial stuff. Sometimes it appears to want to be some kind of Jaane Bhi Do Yaaro, but all it can do is get in the same sentence of a review as that film".
