= Abbas (actor) =

Indian actor (born 1975)

- Born: Mirza Abbas Ali; 21 May 1975 (age 51); Howrah, West Bengal, India
- Occupations: Actor; model; motivational speaker
- Years active: 1996–2015; 2025–present
- Works: Full list
- Spouse: Erum Ali (m. 1997)
- Children: 2

Mirza Abbas Ali (born 21 May 1975), mononymously known as Abbas, is an Indian actor known for his works predominantly in Tamil and Telugu films alongside a few Malayalam, Kannada and Hindi films.

Following a career as a fashion model, he made his film debut with Kathir's Kadhal Desam (1996), which garnered box-office success and gave him instant recognition. Abbas went on to work in successful movies such as VIP (1997), Pooveli (1998), Padayappa (1999), Suyamvaram (1999), Malabar Police (1999), Kandukondain Kandukondain (2000), Minnale (2001), Aanandham (2001), Pammal K. Sambandam (2002), Adi Thadi (2004), Guru En Aalu (2009), and Ramanujan (2014).

He also appeared in notable Telugu films including Priya O Priya (1997), Rajahamsa (1998), Raja (1999), and Anasuya (2007). Abbas gained recognition in Malayalam films as well, notably in Kannezhuthi Pottum Thottu (1999).

== Early life ==
Mirza Abbas Ali was born into an Urdu-speaking Muslim family on 21 May 1975 in Howrah, a twin city of Kolkata. Abbas has spoken about going through a phase of being a troubled teenager.

He has also stated that his first goal was to become an air force pilot. However, he wasn't successful in clearing the entrance examination for the National Defence Academy (India), the main training institute for the Indian Armed Forces. When that dream didn't materialise, Abbas had an alternative plan to pursue MBA.

Abbas grew up watching Hindi films. His maternal grandfather, Farrukh Mirza, acted in Neel Darpan (Bengali) and his paternal family was related to actor Feroz Khan. He took up modelling assignments during his college days and won "Face of 94" in Bangalore. His colleagues from the modelling world include Dino Morea, Suman Ranganathan, Rajeev Gopalkrishna, Rahul Dev and Sameer Malhotra.

== Career ==
=== Early career and success: 1996–1999 ===
Initially, after hearing that director Kadhir was looking for a new actor for his latest venture, Abbas had recommended his friends who knew Tamil to audition and took part in a speculative audition at the insistence of a friend. Kadhir was impressed with Abbas' performance and invited him to a screen test for Kadhal Desam (1996), before eventually signing him on to play a leading role. Unfamiliar with the Tamil language, Abbas memorized his lines on the set of the film and Kadhir began the shoot with easier portions, in order to ease Abbas into his role. Featuring alongside Vineeth and Tabu, Kadhal Desam became a critical and commercial success and Abbas was dubbed by the media as a "heart-throb", garnering several more acting offers. The soundtrack of the movie, including the song "Mustafa Mustafa", featuring him and Vineeth, was a hit.

His busy schedule meant that he missed out on various successful films including Kadhalukku Mariyadhai (1997) and Jeans (1998), and the Tamil films he appeared in such as Jolly (1998) Ini Ellam Sugame (1998), Aasai Thambi (1998) were predominantly box office failures. The movies that he missed became huge success later. Meanwhile, the success of Kaadhal Desam's dubbed Telugu version — Prema Desam, allowed him to make a breakthrough in Telugu films and his next ventures Priya O Priya (1997) and Rajahamsa (1998) were profitable. He also appeared in the youth-centric film, Shanti Shanti Shanti (1999), featuring alongside debutant Madhavan in his first Kannada film.

In 1999, Abbas acted in eight movies — four Telugu, three Tamil and one Malayalam. He began 1999 by debuting in Malayalam cinema with Kannezhuthi Pottum Thottu, alongside Manju Warrier. The film became a super-hit at the box office. His next appearance was in Raja (1999), alongside Venkatesh and Soundarya and the film became a blockbuster. Abbas played the role of Rajinikanth's son-in-law in Padayappa, which became the highest-grossing Tamil film of 1999. He played a lead role in Suyamvaram (1999), which was planned by Giridharilal Nagpal, who produced and wrote the film's story and brought together 14 major directors, 19 cinematographers and over 30 leading actors in the Tamil film industry. It became notable for casting the most stars in a film and also for being the quickest ever feature-length film made, with filming being completed in 23 hours and 58 minutes. The film also became a commercial success at the box office.

=== Heart-throb and career high: 2000–2005 ===
Abbas appeared in a small role in Hey Ram (2000), which starred Kamal Hassan along with Bollywood stars Shahrukh Khan and Rani Mukerji in the leading role. Dreams (2000), a Malayalam film, was released after Hey Ram (2000), where Abbas appeared with Dileep and Meena. The movie became a flop at the box office. In 2000, Abbas worked with Rajiv Menon's romantic-drama Kandukondain Kandukondain, including an ensemble cast of Mammootty, Ajith Kumar, Aishwarya Rai Bachchan and Tabu. The film became commercially successful and marked the second collaboration of Abbas and Tabu after Kadhal Desam. Abbas then acted in the Telugu film Madhuri (2000) which became a box-office failure. In 2001, Abbas starred in Minnale, with Reema Sen and R. Madhavan, where he was portrayed as a college rival to Madhavan's character and his role was very much acclaimed. The film went on to become one of the blockbusters of the year. This was the second film of Abbas and Madhavan after the 1998 Kannada film Shanti Shanti Shanti. Abbas made a cameo appearance, portraying himself in Vinnukum Mannukum (2001). He then appeared in N. Lingusamy's directorial debut, the family drama Aanandham (2001), with Mammootty, Murali and Sneha. It was the second collaboration of Abbas and Mammootty after Kandukondain Kandukondain (2000). It became one of the biggest hits of Abbas's career. Abbas' performance in the film was praised by critics. In an interview, he picked Aanandham as his career-best film.

In 2002, Abbas collaborated once again with Kamal Hassan in comedy film Pammal K. Sambandam, where he shared the screen with Simran and Sneha again. In the movie, he played the role of Kamal Hassan's brother. It received positive reviews and became a commercial success. He then collaborated with Vineeth again in romantic drama Nee Premakai (2002), directed by Muppalaneni Shiva, with Laya playing the female lead role in the film. Regarding his performance in the film, a critic wrote, "Abbas simply dominates the show throughout as a cunningly cute contender. He keeps good humour going on with his funny acts". In 2002 he made his debut in Bollywood with Ansh: The Deadly Part. He worked in an ensemble cast alongside Ashutosh Rana, Om Puri, Milind Gunaji, Rajat Bedi, Sharbani Mukherjee, Shama Sikander and Ashish Vidyarthi. The film was not a big success, but its soundtrack composed by Nadeem–Shravan became a hit. After this, two further films, including Aur Phir with Bipasha Basu, were shelved, and he continued to appear in Tamil films in supporting roles through the mid-2000s.

Abbas again collaborated with Kathir for Kadhal Virus (2002), with Richard Rishi and Sridevi Vijaykumar. Unlike his previous two films with the director – Kadhal Desam (1996) and Kadhalar Dhinam (1999) – Kathir's Kadhal Virus was panned by critics and fared poorly at the box office. Abbas then appeared alongside R. Sarathkumar and Sakshi Shivanand in Manasthan (2004), directed by Marumalarchi Bharathi. The film opened to mixed reviews. He again collaborated with Soundarya in Tamil–Kannda horror film Swetha Naagu (2004), which became an average grosser. Abbas played role of a villain in Tamil horror film Shock (2004). He shared an ensemble cast with Prashanth, Meena, Thiagarajan, Suhasini, Kalairani, and Sarath Babu. The film received a positive response from critics and was a box office success. In 2004, he co-starred with Sathyaraj in the action comedy Adi Thadi, which became a super-hit. It was second collaboration of Abbas and Sathyaraj after Malabar Police (1999). He reprised his role in its Telugu remake Political Rowdy (2005), which was not great success like original film. His last release of 2005 was an action-drama movie, Vanakkam Thalaiva.

=== Supporting roles: 2006–2010 ===
Abbas made a cameo appearance in Unarchigal (2006), which opened to mixed reviews. His next venture was as a lead in 47A Besant Nagar Varai (2006) with Sangeetha and Ravali. The film began production under the title of Mansakkul Varalaama in 1997. Abbas played a negative role in black comedy thriller Thiruttu Payale (2006), with Jeevan and Sonia Agarwal. The film was a commercial success grossing ₹ 250 million at the box office and became the third highest grossing Tamil film of 2006 only behind Varalaru and Vettaiyaadu Vilaiyaadu.

He played a supporting role in Telugu social-drama film Chandrahas (2007), which was not a high success, but won Sarojini Devi Award for a Film on National Integration. In 2007, he co-starred with Bhumika Chawla in Telugu thriller film, Anasuya. The film released to positive reviews and was recorded as a hit at the box office, running for 50 days. His 50th film as an actor was Sadhu Miranda (2008). A Tamil comedy thriller film, Abbas co-starred with Prasanna and Kavya Madhavan, where he played a negative role.

Abbas collaborated with Tabu again in Idi Sangathi (2008), whose casting was praised. This film marks the third collaboration between Abbas and Tabu after the Tamil films Kadhal Desam (1996) and Kandukondain Kandukondain (2000). He starred with Jackie Shroff, Raghuvaran, Rahul Dev and Veda in Telugu heist-film Bank (2009), which received negative reviews. Abbas once-again collaborated with Madhavan in comedy Guru En Aalu (2009), which also features Mamta Mohandas, Vivek and Brinda Parekh.

In 2010, Abbas played a supporting role in Appu and Pappu, which was notably the first Kannada film to feature an orangutan in a major role. Appu and Pappu was a surprise box office success and ran for a hundred days.

=== Decline and struggle: 2011–2015 ===
Abbas made a guest appearance in K. V. Anand directorial Tamil film Ko (2011). The film was released on 22 April 2011 to mostly positive reviews, and became a commercial success. He then reprised his role from Sadhu Miranda (2008) in its Telugu remake Maaro (2011). Abbas co-starred with Nithiin and Meera Chopra. The film was shot in 2005 and in 2006, the film was shelved. It was eventually released in 2011 to cash in on director Siddique's recent success with Bodyguard.

In 2013, it was announced that Abbas would play a role in Malayalam film titled Love Story, where Maqbool Salmaan would to be the main hero. However, the project could not proceed further. He then appeared in an important role in Kannada film Savaari 2 (2014). In recent years, Abbas has appeared in television serials, while he also portrayed scientist Prasanta Chandra Mahalanobis in Ramanujan (2014). Due to his fading interest in acting, he moved to Auckland, New Zealand, where he worked in menial jobs such as gas stations and construction to support his family before becoming a motivational speaker. In 2015, his film was released under the title Pachakkallam in 2015.

=== Comeback: 2025-present ===
In 2025, Abbas making his re-entry after a long hiatus with Happy Raj, which comes as a big surprise and joy to Tamil cinema fans. Combining G. V. Prakash's growth on one hand and Abbas's comeback journey on the other, this film has become a talked-about project since its release. The film was released on 27 March 2026.

== Other works ==
=== Motivational speaker ===
Abbas has appeared as a motivational speaker on the media. He have spread awareness about suicidal thoughts through online workshops and seminars.

=== Business ===
In New Zealand, he lived in Auckland and worked as a mechanic and taxi driver because he migrated on a work permit instead of an Employment Pass. He also began to help Indian movies find locations in New Zealand and arrange shootings and accommodations. Abbas is running a family-based business in Bangalore, Chennai and Hyderabad.

== Legacy ==
Abbas is known for his charming screen presence and his ability to portray a range of characters, from romantic leads to supporting roles. He shared screen space with several leading actors and actresses in the Tamil film industry and is well-liked by audiences for his performances. His hairstyle in Kadhal Desam (1996) became popular across South India, referred to as "Abbas cut", which is still popular. The success of Kadhal Desam established him as one of the leading romantic heroes of Tamil cinema.

The film had music by A. R Rahman and the album turned out to be a hit with songs including "Enai Kaanavillaye" and "Hello Doctor". Lyrics for the songs were by Vaali. However, the song "Musthafa Musthafa" sung by A. R Rahman became such a runaway hit that even after more than two decades, it's still one of the most sought-after songs on friendship. Abbas became a star overnight after his debut in the film and he earned a massive fan following, especially among women.

== Personal life ==
Abbas married Erum Hussain Khan in 1997. After marriage, Erum launched her own label known as Erum ALi & EA Bridal Lounge. The couple have a daughter and a son. Erum designed costumes for movies, notably Aayirathil Oruvan and Guru En Aalu, where Abbas' co-star Madhavan's wife, Saritha, also worked as a designer.

In 2022, Abbas had a minor injury on his knee and got surgery. After an 11-year hiatus from Tamil cinema, Abbas made his comeback with the 2026 film Happy Raj, whose official poster was released in December 2025.

== Awards ==
- 1994: "Face of 94" in Bangalore
