= Maaro (film) =

- Violent But Silent
- Directed by: Siddique
- Written by: Siddique; Chintapalli Ramana (dialogues)
- Produced by: Mamidala Srinivas; Venu Madhav Kondle
- Starring: Nithiin; Meera Chopra; Abbas
- Cinematography: V. Jayaram
- Edited by: T. R. Sekar; K. R. Gowrishankar
- Music by: Mani Sharma
- Release date: 11 June 2011
- Running time: 150 minutes
- Country: India
- Language: Telugu

Maaro (Violent But Silent) is a 2011 Indian Telugu-language action comedy film directed by Siddique. It stars Nithiin and Meera Chopra in the lead roles. The film was shot in 2005 and 2006 but was shelved. It was eventually released in 2011 to cash in on director Siddique's recent success with Bodyguard. The music is scored by Mani Sharma. Maaro was remade in Tamil as Sadhu Miranda, which ended up releasing first. The film is loosely based on the director's own 1995 Malayalam film Mannar Mathai Speaking which was based on the 1958 movie Vertigo.

== Plot ==
A theft takes place in a bank named DID Bank in the city in which a girl is shot dead, and the manager of the bank commits suicide. The robbery involves Ram Mohan (Abbas) and ex-minister Venkatratnam (Kota Srinivasa Rao). Sundaram (Nithiin) belongs to the family affected by the theft. He meets Priya. Sundaram faces the consequences in the process of proving that Ram Mohan is the culprit.

== Cast ==
- Nithiin as Sathya Narayan Murthy / Fake Siva / Sundaram
- Meera Chopra as Priya
- Abbas as Ram Mohan
- Kota Srinivasa Rao as ex-minister Venkatratnam
- Venu Madhav as Narayana
- Ali
- Kalpika Ganesh as Priya's sister
- Chalapathi Rao as Doctor
- Rama Prabha as Priya's grandmother
- Raghu Babu
- Raja Sridhar as Siva (Ram Mohan's younger brother) / Fake Murthy
- Ambati Srinivas
- Mani Sharma in a special appearance in the song “Kannulu Moose”

== Production ==
The film was announced as Satyam Sivam Sundaram.

== Soundtrack ==
The music was composed by Mani Sharma and released by Aditya Music.

Maaro

Soundtrack album by Mani Sharma
- Released: 2011
- Recorded: 2011
- Genre: Soundtrack
- Length: 27:58
- Label: Aditya Music
- Producer: Mani Sharma

Mani Sharma chronology
Solo (2011)	Maaro (2011)	Teen Maar (2011)

Track-List
No.	Title	Lyrics	Singer(s)	Length
1.	"Picasso Sathiya"	Ananta Sriram	Rita, Rahul	4:49
2.	"Kannulu Moose"	Samavedam Shanmukha Sarma	N. C. Karunya, Sreeram Chandra	5:05
3.	"Edhemyna Kani"	Ananta Sriram	Sunitha Upadrashta, Murali	5:02
4.	"Maaro Maaro"	Kandikonda	Chakri	4:34
5.	"Vennele Veedhiloni"	Sri Mani	Ananta Sriram	4:22
6.	"Ammo Ammammo"	Suddala Ashok Teja	Sunitha Upadrashta, Murali	4:06
Total length:				27:58

== See also ==
- Remakes of films by Alfred Hitchcock
