= Minnale =

- Theatrical release poster
- Directed by: Gautham Vasudev Menon
- Written by: Gautham Vasudev Menon; Vipul D. Shah; Nagarajan
- Produced by: Sunanda Murali Manohar
- Starring: Madhavan; Abbas; Reema Sen
- Cinematography: R. D. Rajasekhar
- Edited by: Suresh Urs
- Music by: Harris Jayaraj
- Production company: Cee (I) TV Entertainment
- Release date: 1 February 2001
- Running time: 174 minutes
- Country: India
- Language: Tamil

Minnale (transl. 'Lightning') is a 2001 Indian Tamil-language romance film directed by Gautham Vasudev Menon in his directorial debut. The story was written by Menon and Vipul D. Shah. The film, starring Madhavan, Abbas and Reema Sen, tells the story of a man stealing the identity of his former college enemy, to pursue his lady love, and the eventual repercussions he has to face when his enemy arrives.

The film's original soundtrack composed by debutant music composer Harris Jayaraj, became popular prior to the film's release. The cinematography of the film was handled by R. D. Rajasekhar and it was edited by Suresh Urs. Reema Sen made her Tamil debut through this film.

Minnale was released on 2 February 2001 and became a major commercial success. Menon remade the film in Hindi the same year as Rehnaa Hai Terre Dil Mein, with Madhavan reprising his role and debuting in Hindi cinema. The Hindi one was remade in Punjabi in 2010 as Mel Karade Rabba starring Jimmy Shergill, Neeru Bajwa and Gippy Grewal with Diljeet Dosanjh in a cameo. The film was also remade in Kannada as Mr. Duplicate (2011). Despite the Hindi remake, it was also dubbed into that language as Mad Mad Ishq (2020).

== Plot ==
Rajesh Shivakumar and Sam are engineering students at a college in Ooty. Sam is an accomplished, popular student, whereas Rajesh is an underachiever prone to rebellious and aggressive behaviour. Their contrasting personalities lead to a bitter rivalry throughout their college years. Upon graduation, they part ways. Sam moves to the United States to work as a software engineer, while Rajesh remains in India.

Two years later, Rajesh works as a software instructor in Chennai, living with his grandfather Subbuni and his close friend Chockalingam "Chokku". Although offered an overseas assignment in Singapore, Rajesh turns it down to stay with his grandfather. During a visit to Bangalore, he falls in love at first sight with Reena Joseph, a chartered accountant. After several chance encounters, Rajesh discovers that Reena has been transferred to Chennai.

Rajesh and Chokku meet Reena's friend, Vasuki, who reveals that Reena is engaged to her childhood friend Rajiv Samuel, an Indian-American software engineer settled in Seattle. Learning that Reena has not seen Rajiv since childhood, Rajesh is encouraged by Subbuni and Chokku to impersonate Rajiv to get close to her. Believing he is Rajiv, Reena falls in love with Rajesh, and the two spend five days together. Before Rajesh can confess his true identity, the actual Rajiv arrives in Chennai. Discovering the deception, an enraged Reena breaks off the relationship and warns Rajesh to stay away.

Determined to explain his actions, Rajesh and his friends go to meet Rajiv, only to discover that he is Sam. Believing Rajesh acted out of past animosity, Sam refuses to call off the wedding. Rajesh repeatedly attempts to win Reena back, but she rejects him. After Rajesh interrupts a date between Reena and Sam, a brawl breaks out between the two men, and Sam firmly cautions Rajesh to stay away. Rajesh later plans an attack on Sam with his friends, but backs out at the last moment, realising that violence will not regain Reena's affection and accepting that she will marry Sam.

Heartbroken, Rajesh accepts the Singapore assignment to move on. Meanwhile, Reena realises she remains in love with Rajesh despite his deceit. On his wedding day, Sam notices Reena's distress and recognises that her heart belongs to Rajesh. Unwilling to marry her under these circumstances, Sam calls off the wedding and drives Reena to the airport, where Rajesh is preparing to board his flight. Setting aside their past hostility, Sam reunites the couple before departing, and Rajesh and Reena reconcile.

== Cast ==
- Madhavan as Rajesh Shivakumar
- Abbas as Rajiv Samuel 'Sam'
- Reema Sen as Reena Joseph
- Nagesh as Subramanyam 'Subbuni'
- Vivek as Chockalingam 'Chokku'
- Kitty as Joseph, Reena's father
- Fathima Babu as Shanthi, Reena's mother
- Rajiv Choudhry as Rajiv's father
- Janaki Sabesh as Rajiv's mother
- A. C. Murali Mohan
- Raji Iyer as Vasuki, Reena's friend
- Pondy Ravi as Ravi, Reena's neighbour in Chennai
- Manish Borundia as Manish, Rajesh's classmate
- Krishna as the lorry driver

Uncredited

- Vidharth as Rajesh's classmate
- Gautham Vasudev Menon as the flower deliveryman to Reena
- R. D. Rajasekhar as the flower deliveryman to Reena
- Nagendra Prasad as a dancer in "Azhagiya Theeye" song
- Shobi as a dancer in "Azhagiya Theeye" song
- Sridhar as a dancer in "Azhagiya Theeye" song

== Production ==
Gautham Vasudev Menon launched a Tamil romantic film titled, O Lala in 2000 with the project eventually changing producers and title into Minnale with Madhavan, who was at the beginning of his career, being signed on to portray the lead role. About the making of the film, Menon revealed that he found it difficult as the team was new to the industry with only the editor, Suresh Urs, being a prominent technician in the industry. Menon had come under further pressure when Madhavan had insisted that Menon narrated the story to his mentor, Mani Ratnam, to identify if the film was a positive career move after the success of his Alai Payuthey. Despite initial reservations, Menon did so and Ratnam was unimpressed; however Menon has cited that he thought that Madhavan "felt sorry" and later agreed to continue with the project. Miss World 1999, Yukta Mookhey was considered to play the film's heroine during July 2000, as was Isha Koppikar, but eventually they were left out and Reema Sen, who appeared in her first Tamil film, was cast. Minnale also saw Madhavan collaborating with Abbas for second time after Kannada film Shanti Shanti Shanti. Post-release, Abbas felt that his role had been reduced and accused Madhavan of playing a role in editing his sequences out from the film.

== Music ==
The music and background score were composed by Harris Jayaraj, previously a keyboard player under other composers, in his debut at composing. The audio cassette of the film was released in Chennai at a function in January 2001, where the songs were also screened.

== Release and reception ==
Minnale was released on 2 February 2001. Upon release it went on to become a major commercial success. Madhavan became extremely popular among the youth after the release of Alai Payuthey, but had a setback as his next film Ennavalle underperformed. Minnale made him once again popular among the youth. Savitha Padmanabhan of The Hindu claimed that the film had a "lot of verve and vigour" and that it was "sure to go down well" with the "yuppie, college-going youngsters". A reviewer, Shilpa Kannan from Zee Next, also gave the film a positive review, writing "the entire movie is given an advertisement like treatment by the director. It is glossy, stylish, youthful and trendy". Visual Dasan of Kalki rated the film "above average". Harris Jayaraj won the Filmfare Award for Best Music Director – Tamil, the film's only nomination at the 49th Filmfare Awards South. Jayaraj broke A. R. Rahman’s 9 year long Filmfare winning streak.

== Other versions ==
Minnale was dubbed into Telugu under the name Cheli and also performed well at the box office, owing to Madhavan's popularity in Andhra Pradesh. The film was remade by Menon in Hindi the same year as Rehnaa Hai Terre Dil Mein, with Madhavan reprising his role and making his Hindi debut. The Hindi version became an above average grosser at the box office but belatedly gained popularity and subsequently developed a cult following amongst young audiences. The film was also remade in Kannada as Mr. Duplicate (2011).
