= Sadhu Miranda =

- DVD cover
- Directed by: Siddique
- Written by: Gokula Krishnan (dialogues)
- Story by: Siddique
- Starring: Prasanna; Abbas; Kavya Madhavan
- Cinematography: Prathap Kumar
- Edited by: T. R. Sekhar; Gowrishankar
- Music by: Deepak Dev
- Production company: Alka Films Copporation
- Distributed by: Pyramid Saimira
- Release date: 8 February 2008
- Country: India
- Language: Tamil

Sadhu Miranda (transl. If the Meek Get Angered) is a 2008 Indian Tamil-language comedy thriller film directed by Siddique, starring Prasanna, Abbas and Kavya Madhavan in the lead roles, while Karunas and Manoj K. Jayan play supporting roles. The music was composed by Deepak Dev, and cinematography was done by Prathap Kumar. The film was released on 8 February 2008. The story is about the transformation of a common man into a gangster. It was Abbas's 50th film as an actor.

The film was a remake of the delayed Telugu film Maaro. The film is loosely based on the director's own 1995 Malayalam film Mannar Mathai Speaking which was based on the 1958 Alfred Hitchcock movie Vertigo.

== Plot ==
The film begins with a robbery of 20 crores at the DID bank in Pondicherry, which belongs to the minister (Kota Srinivasa Rao). The robbers take hostages during the robbery and on encountering the police, they end up killing a college student. The story then shifts to Shiva/Sundaram (Prasanna), a visibly foolish person who is looking for David Raj (Manoj K. Jayan), where he saves a girl from getting molested by one of Raj's henchmen. Sundaram asks David for "stuff", telling that his friend Moorthy had asked him to get the stuff for Rs. 10000 and sell it for Rs. 20000. However, David, understanding that Moorthy is a fool, sends in 1 crore worth of heroin without the knowledge of Shiva (Raja Sridhar), saying that there will be a call to the phone he gives and tells him to deliver it to the address the caller says. Instead, David plans to get Sundaram caught red-handed dealing drugs by the police, so that they won't interfere in David's base of operations. However, Shiva goes the wrong way and comes across Priya (Kavya Madhavan) who is assisting an old lady carrying logs. Sundaram ends up helping her and in the meantime, another person with the same dress as Sundaram and a similar briefcase goes ahead and the police assume that he is Sundaram and catches that person. Sundaram then goes to see his friend Vellai (Karunas), where Vellai has taken money from a lender for interest to give to Shiva. At his place, they open up the package, and they both think it is toothpaste powder. In a comical twist, the moneylender and his assistant get caught by the police for dealing drugs.

The next day, Shiva calls the TV station where Priya works, where he reveals that he is the brother of Ram Mohan (Abbas) and that Moorthy must call him; else, he would die jumping from the top of a building. Worried, Priya calls the police, who navigate where Shiva is and as it turns out, he hadn't jumped but let Priya and the police know that Moorthy had called him by writing a message on the wall. After a couple of more encounters with Shiva, Priya starts to like him, but Shiva makes it clear that she cannot fall for her. Meanwhile, it is revealed that Ram Mohan and Priya are friends and Ram Mohan is planning on taking her to the US with him in a few days. Shiva gets angry as he doesn't want her to go to the US, so she plans to take Shiva with her as well. Priya finds some factors that lead her to decide that Shiva isn't who he says he is and throws him out of the house. He calls her the next day saying that he is going to commit suicide by setting himself on fire. In this melee, Ram Mohan comes from the US and Priya requests him to save Shiva; however, he is too late and Shiva dies.

After Shiva is sighted by Priya and Vellai, along with eerie happenings in the house like Priya's and Ram Mohan's passports being burned, Ram Mohan and Priya find out that Shiva is still alive. Based on previous information Shiva had mentioned to Priya, Ram Mohan deduces that Shiva is an IIT dropout who is actually called Sundaramoorthy and the person who he had shown as Moorthy was actually Ram Mohans brother Shiva. Ram Mohan poisons Priya's mind by saying that Shiva had killed Priya's father, who was the manager of the bank that was robbed at the beginning of the movie. Shiva attempts to kill Ram Mohan when Ram Mohan takes Priya to a sketch artist to get an image of Shiva. Ram Mohan escapes and Moorthy saves Priya from goons set by Ram Mohan. Upset and betrayed, thinking that Moorthy had killed her father, she injects him with a substance that will slowly kill him. On the verge of death, Moorthy explains that Ram Mohan and his actual brother Shiva are the ones who had robbed the bank and murdered her father. He also reveals that Ram Mohan had set his brother on fire when Shiva had tried to burn Ram Mohan alive, on Moorthy's orders. Priya calls her friend, a doctor (Thalaivasal Vijay) and he recommends medicine to keep Moorthy stabilized. Ram Mohan eavesdrops on the conversation and takes Priya hostage. Moorthy fights with Ram Mohan and at the climax, reveals his motivation to kill Ram Mohan. Moorthy's sister is the college student who was killed at the beginning of the movie, and on seeing her dead body, Moorthy's mother also passes away from shock. Moorthy finally kills Ram Mohan by throwing him off the building and rides away with Priya.

== Cast ==
- Prasanna as Sundaramoorthy
- Abbas as Ram Mohan
- Kavya Madhavan as Priya
- Karunas as Vellai (Vellaisamy)
- Kota Srinivasa Rao as Venkata Sabhapathy
- M. S. Bhaskar as Moneylender
- Charle
- Vaiyapuri as Kapoor
- Manoj K. Jayan as David Raj
- Kanal Kannan as Esakki
- Sachu as Priya's grandmother
- Rajalakshmi as Sundaramoorthy and Lakshmi's mother
- Gayathri Priya as Priya's sister-in-law
- Raja Sridhar as Shiva
- Anaina Xavier
- Surjith Ansary as Priya's cousin
- Mithra Kurian as Lakshmi, Sundaramoorthy's sister (uncredited)

Cameo appearances by

- Manivannan as Bank Manager
- Sethu Vinayagam as Inspector general of police
- Sriman as Dancer (special appearance in the song "Ramana Porandalum")
- Thalaivasal Vijay as Doctor Janakiraman
- Shwetha Menon (special appearance in the song "Habibi Habibi")

== Soundtrack ==
Soundtrack was composed by Deepak Dev.

All lyrics are written by Na. Muthukumar.

No.	Title	Singer(s)	Length
1.	"Needhana Needhana"	Ranjith, Shweta Mohan	05:31
2.	"Ramana Porandalum"	Jassie Gift, Vineetha	05:54
3.	"Aagayam Kaanamal"	Srinivas, Jyothsna	04:54
4.	"Habibi Habibi"	Vijay Yesudas	04:57
5.	"Puyalodu Mothidum"	Susith Suresan, Sayanora Philip	03:29
6.	"Theme of Sadhu Miranda"	Susith Suresan	01:50
Total length:			25:00

== Critical reception ==
Sify wrote, "What works for Siddique is that the humour blends to a certain extent with the thriller plot. What boomerangs is it all looks too familiar. If you are just looking for some corny laughs, then Sadhu Mirindal is worth a look". Pavithra Srinivasan of Rediff.com wrote, "At first look, you'll have to admit that the Tamil film Saadhu Miranda... (If the Meek are angered) doesn't look very promising, with its hero looking a little too naive, and its heroine too made-up, not to mention a horde of cheesy villains. But Alka Film Corporation's venture, directed by Siddique, soon makes you sit up and take notice." Cinesouth wrote, "A little inattention would have messed up the confusing screenplay, but director Siddiq had it well under control to deliver a successful circus act".

== See also ==
- Remakes of films by Alfred Hitchcock
