= Rajahamsa =

1998 Telugu film by Singeetham Srinivasa Rao

- Directed by: Singeetam Srinivasa Rao
- Written by: Story & Screenplay: Singeetam Srinivasa Rao; Dialogues: Sankaramanchi Parthasarathi
- Starring: Abbas; Sakshi Shivanand
- Cinematography: K. Prasad
- Edited by: Gowtham Raju
- Music by: M. M. Keeravani
- Production company: Amitabh Bachchan Corporation Limited
- Release date: 20 February 1998
- Running time: 123 minutes
- Country: India
- Language: Telugu

Rajahamsa (lit. 'The royal swan') is a 1998 Indian Telugu-language romantic comedy film written and directed by Singeetam Srinivasa Rao. The film stars Abbas and Sakshi Shivanand. Produced by Amitabh Bachchan Corporation the film features a story and screenplay written by Srinivasa Rao, with dialogues penned by Sankaramanchi Parthasarathi. The music was composed by M. M. Keeravani.

== Plot ==
Sanjana, the daughter of businessman Ram Prasad, is strongly opposed to the arranged marriage her father has planned for her with the son of his childhood friend. She is in love with Harish and wishes to marry him instead. During a shopping trip, Sanjana encounters her would-be father-in-law, who gives her ₹50,000 for wedding preparations. Seizing the opportunity, she escapes to Srisailam, hiring a cab driven by Raju, who names his vehicle "Rajahamsa," with the intention of reuniting with Harish. Meanwhile, Raju, a cab driver struggling with a debt of ₹25,000, accepts Ram Prasad's offer of ₹25,000 to locate Sanjana and bring her back. Raju tracks her down in Srisailam and forcibly returns her to her father, despite her revealing her unhappiness with the marriage and her love for Harish. Impressed by Raju's efforts, Ram Prasad rewards him with additional money, but Raju is soon overcome with guilt. He returns the money and advises Ram Prasad to allow Sanjana to marry Harish, but his suggestion is met with anger. Unknown to both men, Sanjana overhears their conversation.

Desperate to escape her forced marriage, Sanjana secretly writes to Raju, asking for his help once more. As the family is busy with wedding preparations, Raju arrives with his cab, and Sanjana seizes the chance to flee. She asks Raju to take her to Harish, but their journey is fraught with challenges. Along the way, they encounter her would-be father-in-law and face persistent attempts by Ram Prasad's assistants to capture her. As they navigate these obstacles, Raju becomes more supportive of Sanjana's resolve to reunite with Harish. Their journey also brings them closer, as they develop a mutual respect and understanding. The narrative unfolds as they strive to overcome the barriers in their path and fulfill Sanjana's desire to follow her heart.

== Cast ==
- Abbas as Raju
- Sakshi Shivanand as Sanjana
- Girish Karnad as Ram Prasad
- S. P. Balasubrahmanyam
- Brahmanandam
- Chandra Mohan
- AVS as Raju's uncle
- Mallikarjuna Rao
- Raavi Kondala Rao as Dr. Murthy (Guest role)
- P. L. Narayana
- Raghunatha Reddy
- R. S. Shivaji
- Indu Anand
- Baby Sreshta
- Krishna Veni
- Neelam

== Production ==
Rajahamsa was directed by veteran filmmaker Singeetam Srinivasa Rao, known for his distinct storytelling style. The film was produced by Amitabh Bachchan Corporation Limited (ABCL), a production company founded by noted actor Amitabh Bachchan. Rajahamsa was ABCL's second production in Telugu, following its co-production of Gulabi (1995). Singeetam also wrote the story and screenplay for the film, while Sankaramanchi Parthasarathi penned the dialogues. Sharath Marar served as the executive producer.

== Music ==
The music of Rajahamsa was composed by M. M. Keeravani. Audio soundtrack was released on Melody Makers label. The song "Rosa Rosa Rosa" became popular.

Track listing
| No. | Title | Lyrics | Singer(s) | Length |
|---|---|---|---|---|
| 1. | "Rosa Rosa Rosa" | Sirivennela Seetharama Sastry | M. M. Keeravani, K. S. Chithra | 4:49 |
| 2. | "Maharajasree" | Samavedam Shanmukha Sarma | S. P. Balasubrahmanyam, K. S. Chithra | 5:12 |
| 3. | "Goppa Chikke Vache" | Veturi | S. P. Balasubrahmanyam, K. S. Chithra | 4:59 |
| 4. | "Mannela Thintivira Krishna" | Siva Shakthi Datta | Malgudi Subha | 4:54 |
| 5. | "Gundelalona Puttindamma" | Veturi | S. P. Balasubrahmanyam, E. Gayathri | 4:26 |
| 6. | "Hello Saaru" | Vennelakanti | M. M. Keeravani, K. S. Chithra | 3:25 |
| Total length: | | | | 27:45 |

== Release and reception ==
Rajahamsa was released on 20 February 1998. Griddaluru Gopala Rao of Zamin Ryot gave the film a positive review, praising its narrative, comedic elements, and the core romantic storyline.
