= Adi Thadi =

- Poster
- Directed by: T. Shivraj
- Produced by: S. Gnanasundari
- Starring: Sathyaraj; Napoleon; Abbas; Rathi; Sukanya
- Cinematography: R. Selva
- Edited by: Udayashankar
- Music by: Deva
- Production company: Sundari Films
- Release date: 5 March 2004
- Country: India
- Language: Tamil

Adi Thadi (transl. Whacking) is a 2004 Indian Tamil-language action comedy film. It stars Sathyaraj, Abbas, Napoleon and Rathi, and was directed by T. Shivraj. It was later remade in Telugu as Political Rowdy in 2005 with Mohan Babu, Charmee Kaur and Prakash Raj enacting the roles of Sathyaraj, Rathi and Napoleon respectively. Abbas reprised his role in the Telugu film.

== Plot ==
Tirupati is a criminal who commands respect even from the state's chief minister. He hates women and remains a bachelor even at the age of 50. A naughty college student Priya grabs Tirupati's attention though a beauty contest, and he falls in love with her and proposes to her. Then, Priya's life turns to disaster because she gets tortured by Tirupati and his henchmen. With the help of his brother Surya, Tirupati changes his appearance to look younger. To escape from this problem, Priya contacts her boyfriend Arjun. The rest is all about how all ends well.

== Cast ==
- Sathyaraj as Tirupati
- Napoleon as Surya
- Abbas as Arjun
- Rathi as Priya
- Sukanya
- Vaiyapuri as Surya's assistant
- Raj Kapoor as Tirupati's henchman
- Nizhalgal Ravi
- Chitra Lakshmanan as Tirupati's assistant
- Vadivel David
- Devan
- Gemini Ganesan as himself (special appearance)
- Deva in a special appearance in the song "Thagadu Thagadu"
- T. Shivraj as himself (special appearance)

== Production ==
The film marked the directorial debut of T. Shivaraj who earlier assisted T. P. Gajendran and S. A. Chandrasekhar.

== Soundtrack ==
The soundtrack was composed by Deva and lyrics were written by Piraisoodan, Kalidasan, Snehan and Deva Kumar. The song "Umma Umma" turned out to be a sensational chartbuster upon release.

| No. | Song | Singers | Lyrics | Length (m:ss) |
|---|---|---|---|---|
| 1 | Umma Umma | Malathy Lakshman, Manikka Vinayagam | Deva Kumar | 04:31 |
| 2 | Machanukku | Pop Shalini, Prasanna | Kalidasan | 04:26 |
| 3 | Eppadi Samalipendi | Sridevi, Naveen | Kalidasan | 04:50 |
| 4 | Thagadu Thagadu | Deva, Tippu, Ganga | Piraisoodan | 04:43 |
| 5 | Athiri pacha | Anuradha Sriram | Snehan | 05:12 |

== Release and reception ==
Sify wrote "Sathyaraj's Adithadi starts off as a rollkicking comedy that peters out towards the end. It is a black comedy, a movie that makes light of serious and usually morbid situations with their own level of hilarity and cleverness". The Hindu wrote "You could double up in laughter, guffaw at the hero's audacity or wrinkle your nose in disgust at certain points, but surely you cannot ignore the film that reminds you so much of the `villainous' Satyaraj of yore." Chennai Online wrote "This picture makes no pretence about being anything other than what it is. A not-to-be-taken-seriously, unpretentious entertainer, hilarious at most times, an irreverent take-off on films depicting local 'dadas' and their ilk, the film is seen through the eyes of a 50-something local don, who falls in love with a teenager, and for once finds himself at a loss on how to go about it". G. Ulaganathan of Deccan Herald wrote "Director Shivraj begins well and what begins as a comedy somewhere midway becomes a little serious".

The relative success of the film prompted Shivraj and Sathyaraj to team up again for a film titled Devuda on fake godmen, though it was later shelved. Soon after, Shivraj began making Enakke Enakka with a new cast, but it was also cancelled.
