= Malabar Police =

- Poster
- Directed by: P. Vasu
- Written by: P. Vasu
- Produced by: Shanthi Vasudevan
- Starring: Sathyaraj; Abbas; Khushbu; Mumtaj
- Cinematography: Ashok Kumar
- Edited by: P. Mohanraj
- Music by: S. A. Rajkumar
- Production company: Kamalam Movies
- Release date: 6 August 1999
- Running time: 150 minutes
- Country: India
- Language: Tamil

Malabar Police (/mələbɑːr/) is a 1999 Indian Tamil-language crime comedy film written and directed by P. Vasu. The film stars Sathyaraj in a dual role, Abbas, Khushbu and Mumtaj. It revolves around an eloping couple witnessing a murder, and evading an attack by the murderer. A CBI officer investigates the murder, and suspects it is connected to a rivalry between two businessmen.

Malabar Police was released on 6 August 1999, and was one of the most successful Tamil films of the year.

== Plot ==
Raja and Julie are lovers in Palakkad, Kerala. Raja is of Tamil ancestry, while Julie is from a Syrian Christian family. Julie's rich parents vehemently oppose their marriage and keep her in confinement. They eventually act upon their plan to elope at dawn, to get married. On the way, they witness the murder of minister Madhavan Nair; the murderer Varadappan tries to kill Raja and Julie too to eliminate any witness of the murder. However, they escape and reach Chennai (the capital of Tamil Nadu) by train.

Chinnasamy is a CBI officer who is appointed to investigate the murder of the minister. He is also from a Tamil family, residing for three generations in Kerala. He comes to Chennai and starts to search for Raja with assistance from constable Govindan. Meanwhile, Nagarajan and Sivashankar are leading businessmen in Chennai but are business rivals. Chinnasamy sets his eyes on Nagarajan, boss of Varadappan, doubting him to be the murderer of Varadappan when he is killed in a blast after his arrest. Sivashankar joins hands with Chinnasamy and helps him gather evidence against Nagarajan due to his business rivalry. Meanwhile, Raja and Julie accidentally get separated, and they keep searching for each other. Chinnasamy spots Julie and employs her as a maid in his home.

Finally, Chinnasamy solves the case and finds that Sivashankar is the actual murderer. Chinnasamy pretended to doubt Nagarajan, which made him close to Sivashankar, helping him gather evidences. It is revealed that Sivashankar used Varadappan as a spy employed with Nagarajan to know his business secrets and he was the real murderer. Sivasankar was a covert friend of Madhavan, and Madhavan had recently given Sivasankar a huge amount of black money for safekeeping. To prevent the money being returned, Sivasankar used Varadappan to finish off Madhavan Nair. In the end, Raja and Julie are united with the help of Chinnasamy as they return to Kerala, while Govindan is promoted to Inspector rank as he assisted to solve the 'criminal case'.

== Cast ==
- Sathyaraj as Chinnasamy and Ramasamy
- Abbas as Raja
- Khushbu as Ammukutty
- Mumtaj as Julie/Jothi
- Sivakumar as Nagarajan
- Goundamani as Govindrajan
- Vijayakumar as Inspector General of Tamil Nadu Police
- Jai Ganesh as Shivashankar
- Anandaraj as Varadappan
- Anand as Driver Anand
- Indhu as Rani, Anand's wife
- Vinu Chakravarthy as Meganathan
- Mohan Raman as Raja's father
- Prathapachandran as Inspector General of Kerala Police
- Thambi Ramaiah as Perumal
- Hemanth Ravan as Police Officer in Chinnasamy's Investing Team
- Ravikumar
- Laxmi Rattan as Kerala Minister Madhavan Nair
- Scissor Manohar
- Thalapathi Dinesh
- Mahanadi Shankar as a goon
- Usharani as Jothi's Mother
- V.P. Ramachandran as Jothi's Father
- Naga Kannan as martial arts hitman from Kerala
- Alphonsa as a dancer (special appearance)

== Soundtrack ==
The music was composed by S. A. Rajkumar. The song "Hollywood Mudhal" is the debut song of lyricist Na. Muthukumar.

Track listing
No.	Title	Lyrics	Singer(s)	Length
1.	"En Kannadi Thoppukkulle"	Arivumathi	Hariharan, K. S. Chithra	4:45
2.	"En Kannadi Pesavillai"	Arivumathi	P. Unnikrishnan, Sujatha Mohan	4:33
3.	"Hollywood Mudhal"	Na. Muthukumar	Gopal Rao	4:07
4.	"Palakaattu Ponnu"	Kalaikumar	K. S. Chithra, Sathyaraj	4:44
5.	"Sona Sona"	Kalaikumar	S. A. Rajkumar, Mano	4:09
Total length:				22:22

== Release and reception ==
Malabar Police was released on 6 August 1999. K. P. S. of Kalki wrote that viewers could enjoy the last 10 minutes if they could endure old fashioned sentiments and lengthy dialogues. D. S. Ramanujam of The Hindu wrote, "Satyaraj is quite at ease in delivering the Malayalam mixed Tamil while unravelling the mystery of the murder of a Kerala Minister, the involvement of a young pair of eloping lovers making it more interesting". Ramanujam concluded, "Ashok Kumar handles the camera with his known efficiency while S. A. Rajkumar has scored the music which is adequate".
