= Jolly (1998 film) =

- Title card
- Directed by: Dilipkumar
- Written by: Dilipkumar
- Produced by: R. B. Choudary
- Starring: Abbas; Keerthi Reddy; Kausalya
- Cinematography: Ganeshram
- Edited by: Jaishankar
- Music by: Kavi
- Production company: Super Good Films
- Release date: 7 May 1998
- Country: India
- Language: Tamil

Jolly is a 1998 Indian Tamil-language coming-of-age film directed by Dilipkumar and produced by R. B. Choudary. The film stars Abbas, Keerthi Reddy, Kausalya, Livingston, and Khushbu, with S. P. Balasubrahmanyam and Janagaraj appearing in supporting roles. It was released on 7 May 1998. Some scenes featuring Telugu actors were directly shot in their language for the dubbed version, which was released under the same title.

== Plot ==
Gowri Shankar, burdened by financial difficulties, travels to Dubai in hopes of improving his family’s fortunes. However, the encouragement of his mother and Chillakamma redirects his path towards education and stability. Enrolling in a prestigious college, Shankar encounters Anitha, also known as Anee, which leads to initial tension between them.

Their relationship gets off to a poor start when Shankar inadvertently ruins one of Anitha’s paintings, earning her ire. Despite his sincere attempt to mend the situation with a thoughtful birthday gift, a mishap involving a bicycle worsens matters. Upset by these incidents, Anitha warns Shankar against making further gestures that she might misinterpret.

As Shankar excels academically, he earns the admiration of his peers and faculty, including the respected lecturer Khushbu. Anitha, recognising his dedication and sincerity, gradually softens her stance. However, a misunderstanding during a train journey leads Anitha to wrongly accuse Shankar of misconduct, resulting in his expulsion from college.

The narrative takes a lighthearted turn with the introduction of Chakravarthy, portrayed by Livingston, whose comedic antics and pursuit of Khushbu add levity to the storyline. His humorous interludes provide a welcome distraction from the emotional tension.

Eventually, with Chakravarthy’s assistance, Khushbu uncovers the truth behind Shankar’s dismissal, restoring his reputation. Shankar and Anitha, now united in their quest for justice, thwart Chakravarthy’s attempts to pursue Khushbu and decide instead to register their own marriage.

However, familial discord arises when Chakravarthy’s father, driven by greed, manipulates Anitha’s father into arranging her marriage with another suitor. Seeking to escape this unwanted arrangement, Anitha and her friends take refuge in Shankar’s village, where a revealing encounter compels Shankar to confront his true feelings.

The impending marriage is ultimately called off when it is revealed that Anitha’s prospective groom is already married and involved in illegal activities. Following this revelation, Anitha’s father urges Shankar to marry his daughter. However, Shankar, true to his principles, declines and pledges himself instead to Chillakamma.

Gowri Shankar’s journey embodies the resilience of the human spirit in the face of adversity, underscored by the enduring bonds of friendship and love that guides him through life’s challenges.

== Cast ==
- Abbas as Gowri Shankar
- Keerthi Reddy as Chillakamma
- Kausalya as Anitha
- Livingston as Chakravarthy
- Khushbu as Nandhini
- Annapoorna as Gowri Shankar's mother
- S. P. Balasubrahmanyam
- Janagaraj as Janak Janak Kumar
- Visweswara Rao as Janak Janak Kumar's assistant
- Vadivelu
- Mansoor Ali Khan as Chakravarthy's father
- Madhan Bob as Anitha's father
- Gundu Hanumantha Rao as Chakravarthy's father's assistant
- Raja Ravindra
- Vaiyapuri as Govind
- Haja Sheriff as John
- Dhamu as one of students in SPB's class
- Tirupathi Prakash as one of students in SPB's class
- Madhusudhan Rao
- Cool Jayanth as dancer in song "Jolly"
- Robert as dancer in song "Jolly"

== Production ==
Vignesh was initially considered for a role in the film but was later dropped. Although there were indications that Shiva would compose the music, the opportunity was ultimately given to newcomer Kavi. This film marked Dilip Kumar's third directorial venture after Abhirami (1992) and Chinna Madam (1994).

== Soundtrack ==
The soundtrack was composed by Kavi.

Track listing
No.	Title	Singer(s)	Length
1.	"Unnai Thotta Pattampoochi"	Sujatha Mohan
2.	"Nandhavaname Nandhavaname"	Hariharan (singer), Swarnalatha
3.	"Idhu Vaazhkaiyil Thirunal (Friendship Day)"	Unnikrishnan, Swarnalatha
4.	"Otha Kallu Mookuthi"	K. S. Chithra, S. P. Sailaja, Arunmozhi
5.	"Jolly Sema Jolly"	Mano, Febi Mani
6.	"Yele Yelo Nee AC Hall"	Mano, Anuradha Sriram
7.	"A Plus B Square"	S. P. Balasubrahmanyam
8.	"Ettukkum Pathukkum Idaiyilathan"	Swarnalatha
9.	"Katchi Kodi Ellam Colora"	Swarnalatha

== Critical reception ==
D. S. Ramanujam of The Hindu wrote, "Debutant director Dilip Kumar, who takes credit for the story, screenplay and dialogue, not knowing which portion of the theme to improve upon, the comedy aspect or the minuscule of a drama, sinks in the quagmire he creates". K. N. Vijiyan of New Straits Times wrote, "I liked the director's emphasis on educational values. And, at least, you don't have a hero whose sole interest seems to be having a jolly good time in the campus".
