= Kandukondain Kandukondain =

- 100-day run poster of Kandukondain Kandukondain
- Directed by: Rajiv Menon
- Screenplay by: Rajiv Menon; Sujatha (dialogues)
- Based on: Sense and Sensibility by Jane Austen
- Produced by: Kalaipuli S. Thanu
- Starring: Mammootty; Ajith Kumar; Aishwarya Rai; Tabu; Abbas
- Cinematography: Ravi K. Chandran
- Edited by: Suresh Urs
- Music by: A. R. Rahman
- Production company: V Creations
- Release date: 5 May 2000
- Running time: 158 minutes
- Country: India
- Language: Tamil

Kandukondain Kandukondain (also released internationally as I Have Found It) is a 2000 Indian Tamil-language romantic musical film directed and co-written by Rajiv Menon. Based on Jane Austen's 1811 novel Sense and Sensibility, it features an ensemble cast of Mammootty, Ajith Kumar, Tabu, Aishwarya Rai and Abbas. Veterans Manivannan, Srividya and Raghuvaran play supporting roles. The film's soundtrack was scored by A. R. Rahman and the cinematographer was Ravi K. Chandran.

After several delays, Kandukondain Kandukondain opened to Tamil Nadu audiences on 5 May 2000 and was commercially successful. The producers released subtitled versions worldwide. The film also won a National Film Award and two Filmfare Awards South, and was featured in international film festivals.

== Plot ==
Major Bala, an Indian Peace Keeping Force personnel, loses a leg in an explosion triggered by Tamil militants while fighting in the jungles of war-torn Sri Lanka. Elsewhere, Manohar, a film director, is greeted at a filming location by his parents, who want him to marry Swetha, so that he will inherit her family's company. Sisters Sowmya and Meenakshi are part of a close-knit family living in a Chettiar mansion in Karaikudi, Tamil Nadu, with their mother Padma, maternal grandfather Chandrasekhar, servant Chinnatha and younger sister Kamala. Sowmya is a school principal while Meenakshi is passionate about classic Tamil poetry, music and dance. Sivagnanam, a friend of Bala, lives with his mother. His mother has breathing issues, which is fixed as soon as he says the word marriage. After his mother says she wants to see a marriage, Sivagnanam shows her two cats, Raj and Viji, getting married, much to her dismay.

Bala, who now runs a floral business, has become depressed and alcohol-dependent since losing his leg. He quits drinking after an argument with Meenakshi, with whom he falls in love and supports her family when in need. At her behest, he stops drinking in exchange for her to learn music, which she does. Meenakshi, who, considers Bala as a friend, falls in love with Srikanth, a charming businessman who shares Meenakshi's interests. Manohar visits Meenakshi's house for a film shoot where Sowmya and Manohar fall in love with each other.

On his deathbed, Chandrasekhar tries to say something about his will but no one understands him. After his death, their lawyer breaks open the box and find he has bequeathed all of his property to his younger son Swaminathan, at the time when his elder daughter Padma had eloped and married without his knowledge, but was unable to change the will as he was paralysed and unable to speak a few years down the lane when his daughter assisted him. Padma and Sowmya silently submit themselves to Swaminathan and his wife, Lalitha's demands, but Meenakshi is unable to accept the change in lifestyle. Sowmya and her family move to Chennai when they can no longer stand Lalitha's arrogant behaviour upon inheriting the mansion.

Upon arriving in Chennai, the family struggles and they work as cooks at a local restaurant. While eating a vazhaipoo vada (banana flower vada), Bala and Sivagnanam recognise its taste and immediately go to the kitchen. They are surprised to see such a rich family working tirelessly in the restaurant. After attending several interviews, Sowmya gets a job as a telephone operator at a software company. She is later promoted to a junior programmer due to her qualifications while Meenakshi becomes a playback singer with Bala's help, but keeps searching for Srikanth whom she has lost contact with. After Sowmya's promotion she gets a home loan approved and they are able to buy their own apartment. Meanwhile, Swaminathan dies of electrocution and in his will the Chettinad house is left to Padma and her family. Ultimately they decide against taking the home away from Lalitha as was done to them, especially as they now have a home of their own.

In the meanwhile, Srikanth's finance company goes bankrupt and he has to pay back his investors. A minister offers to bail out Srikanth and his company in exchange for Srikanth marrying his daughter to the minister. Srikanth agrees but Meenakshi is shocked and overwhelmed at his hypocrisy. She meets Srikanth and his future wife at the time of her first recording and after recording her first song, Meenakshi falls into an open manhole and is rescued by Bala. Realising Bala's love for her, Meenakshi reciprocates his feelings.

Manohar's first film project is in disarray and he is thrown out. While talking to Sowmya's family, he says the name chosen as the film's title was bad omen and attributed the failure to its bad luck. Sowmya who chose the name of the film translates it her being bad luck to him. For his next project, he plans to make an action film with Nandhini Varma, a well-known Telugu film actor, as the heroine. Nandhini is attracted to Manohar; rumours of an affair between them spread and his lack of attention to Sowmya hurts her deeply. Meanwhile Srikanth tries to explain himself to Meenakshi, but she refuses to listen and leaves him. Bala introduces Meenakshi to Vinod, an army officer, as he does not want Meenakshi to dedicate her life to caring for him because of his disability. Meenakshi tells Vinod and his family that she is not interested in him and declares her love to Bala. Manohar's film is a commercial success but when he visits Sowmya's house in Chennai, he finds she is moving to California for her company's project. Manohar and Sowmya tearfully argue and he tries to persuade Sowmya to marry him, and she accepts his proposal. The film ends with Manohar marrying Sowmya and Bala marrying Meenakshi.

== Cast ==
As per the opening and closing credits:

- Mammootty as Major Bala
- Ajith Kumar as Manohar
- Aishwarya Rai as Meenakshi (voice dubbed by Jayageetha)
- Tabu as C. Sowmya (voice dubbed by Revathi)
- Abbas as Srikanth (voice dubbed by Vikram)
- Manivannan as Sivagnanam
- Srividya as Padma
- Raghuvaran as Ramshankar
- Nizhalgal Ravi as Swaminathan
- Shamili as Kamala
- Anita Ratnam as Lalitha
- Unnikrishnan Namboothiri as Chandrasekhar
- Rukumani as Sivagnanam's mother
- Mohan Raman as Parameshwaran
- Dr. Mathrubootham as Manohar's father
- Sathya Priya as Manohar's mother
- S. N. Lakshmi as Chinnatha
- Sreeja as Vatsala
- Neelu as Allimuthu
- Varadharajan as Srikanth's interviewer
- Uma Padmanabhan as Srikanth's interviewer
- Malaysia Vasudevan as a film producer
- Arvind as Manohar's friend
- Gangai Amaren as himself
- Sundaramurthy as the Chennai house owner
- Raviraj as School staff member

Guest appearances

- Dino Morea as Vinod
- Pooja Batra as Nandhini Varma
- Senthil as himself
- Subhasree Thanikachalam as herself (news reporter)
- Shanthi as dancer (uncredited)
- Kalyani Menon as Meenakshi's music teacher (uncredited)
- A. R. Rahman as himself (uncredited)
- Vikram Dharma as himself (uncredited)
- C. Sathya as himself (uncredited, in the song "Yengae Enathu Kavithai")

== Production ==
=== Development ===
After the success of his directorial debut Minsara Kanavu (1997), Rajiv Menon was signed by producer Kalaipuli S. Thanu to direct a film in the final quarter of 1998. In November 1998, Menon announced he had begun pre-production work on a project titled Theekkul Viralai Vaithal, a title taken from a line by Subramania Bharati. The initial idea of the film came from a conversation between Menon and director Mani Ratnam about the contrast between Menon's life and that of his brother. While Menon entered the film industry, his brother focused on an academic career and later became an officer in the Indian Railway Accounts Service. Ratnam later suggested Menon should make a film on the subject.

Menon wrote a screenplay based on the Jane Austen novel Sense and Sensibility and the project was renamed Kandukondain Kandukondain. The title was inspired by the phrase "kanden kanden Seethaiyai kanden" from Kambar's epic Kamba Ramayanam. Menon said the film's story of two sisters was reminiscent of those of him and his brother during difficult parts of their lives. The film was initially launched as a multilingual project in four Indian languages (Tamil, Telugu, Malayalam and Hindi), though it was only released in Tamil with a subsequent Telugu-dubbed version titled Priyuraalu Pilichindi. Menon first wrote the story in English then dictated the dialogue in Malayalam; this was then translated into Tamil by Sujatha.

In November 1999, when most of the production was complete, Menon—whose previous film performed poorly in rural areas—wanted to show a rough copy of Kandukondain Kandukondain to a village audience to ensure they could relate to the subject. After showing parts of the film to audiences in Udumalpettai and Pollachi, the team later held a group discussion before thanking the volunteers with gifts while receiving positive feedback.

=== Casting ===
Tabu was the first actor to be cast in the film; she was cast in the role of the elder sister Sowmya and Revathi was signed to dub for her character. The casting of the younger sister Meenakshi took longer to finalise; initially the team approached Meena for the role, but she declined due to other commitments. Next, Menon approached Manju Warrier, who liked the script but was hesitant to commit to appear in the film due to her impending wedding with Dileep. He next discussed the role with Soundarya, whose team wanted to read the script before committing to the project. However, Soundarya's brother was not interested in letting her play a second heroine. Because Menon was still finalising the climax, he opted to explore other options and Kausalya was briefly considered. Aishwarya Rai was then signed onto the project, making her third appearance in Tamil films after roles in Mani Ratnam's Iruvar (1997) and Shankar's Jeans (1998). Despite being replete with Hindi film offers, Rai said she was a large fan of Menon's work and could strongly identify with the character, and accepted the offer. Menon and writer Sujatha presented two points of view in the female leads; while Sowmya accepts her destiny, Meenakshi wants to make her own life choices. While finalising the character arc of Sowmya, Menon drew inspiration from a person with whom he was familiar.

Initially Menon cast Prabhu Deva, the lead actor of his previous film, in a leading role. Deva had played a key role in introducing Menon to producer Thanu but soon left the project. For the role of a former army general, Menon attempted to cast Parthiban but the actor's difficult relationship with Thanu meant they could not collaborate. Arjun Sarja was also approached but he was working in a different film genre during the period. Eventually, Menon cast Mammootty in the role. Abbas was cast in a role of a young businessman while Vikram dubbed for his character.

Menon approached Prashanth to appear in the film in place of Prabhu Deva, but the actor demanded to be paired opposite Rai rather than Tabu. Menon did not want to switch the female lead actors and decided not to cast Prashanth. In January 1999, Menon met and narrated the script of Kandukondain Kandukondain to Ajith Kumar, who had been recovering from back surgery; Kumar agreed to portray the struggling film director character. While writing the character, Menon was inspired by his experiences as a junior technician looking to make a breakthrough in the film industry. Between signing for Kandukondain Kandukondain and its release in May 2000, Ajith Kumar had significantly expanded his box-office appeal through the commercial success of his other films.

Srividya was signed to play the mother of Tabu and Rai while Shamili played their sister. Nizhalgal Ravi and debutant Anita Ratnam were also cast in the film with Malayalam actor Unnikrishnan Namboothiri making his debut as the bedridden grandfather. Prominent actors Raghuvaran and Manivannan were selected for supporting roles in the film while Hindi actors Dino Morea and Pooja Batra appeared in small character roles, with Batra playing an actor. Cameraman Arvind Krishna appeared in a small role as Ajith Kumar's friend.

Rajiv Menon and Dhanu retained several of the technical team from his previous venture, adding Sujatha as a writer. Menon said he often thought of dialogue in Malayalam—his native language—before telling writer Sujatha to translate it into Tamil. A cinematographer himself, Menon chose to avoid that task in the project and appointed Ravi K. Chandran as the cinematographer. According to Menon, directing and filming at the same time was "strenuous", though he said he photographed almost 30% of Kandukondain Kandukondain because Chandran was briefly unavailable. The film's music was composed by A. R. Rahman while lyrics were written by Vairamuthu; the pair argued during the production. Suresh Urs edited the film while Vikram Dharma directed stunts, Nagu directed arts and Rekha Prakash, Brindha and Raju Sundaram choreographed the songs. Costumes were designed by Nalini Sriram.

=== Filming ===
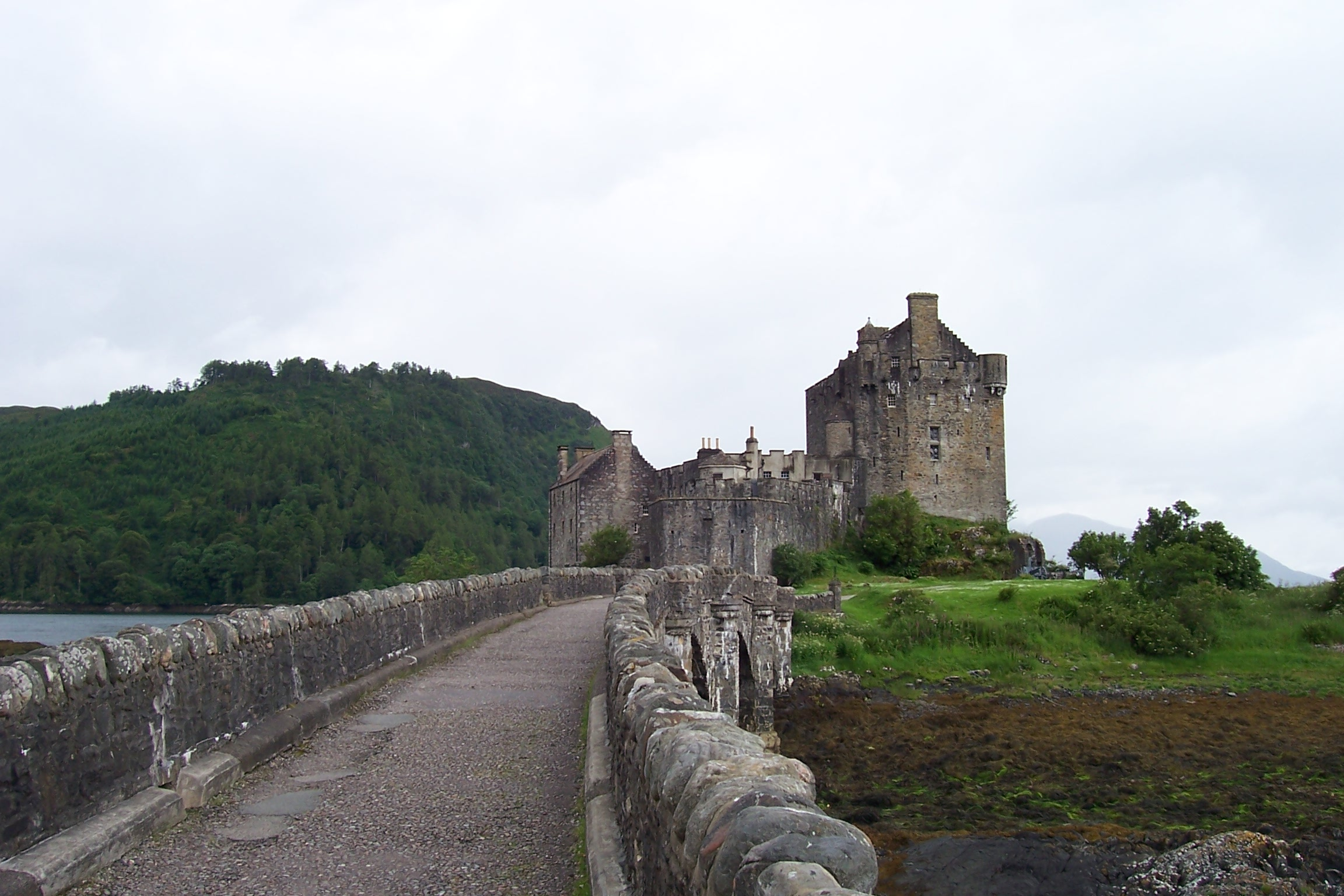
The title song was filmed at Eilean Donan Castle, Scotland.

Scenes with Mammootty's soldier character were filmed in Munnar from February to April 1999, just before the outbreak of the Kargil War. The team were able to borrow a former military helicopter for the sequences. A large portion of the film's first half was filmed in the Kanadugathan area of Karaikudi. The team persuaded industrialist M. A. M. Ramaswamy to lend them his palatial Chettiar mansion for filming; they secured permission to use the property because the producer Thanu was an acquaintance of Ramaswamy. Menon submitted a one-page synopsis of the film to Ramaswamy, who gave his permission under the condition that a death scene was filmed elsewhere. Menon hired the Rao Bahadur house for the extra scenes. According to Menon, during filming in the Chettiar mansion, the unit bonded with Rai and Tabu, becoming good friends; Ajith Kumar learnt from Mammootty and the whole unit ate dinner together. Most of the project's first half was filmed within a week.

In May 1999, the crew along with Rai and Abbas went to Scotland to film the title song in Dornie with the castle of Eilean Donan as a backdrop. Menon used the location to show Rai's character Meenakshi is living in a fantasy world so he filmed the song with a blue and green theme. In comparison, the team wanted to contrast the colours for Tabu's song by using red and brown as the main colours. The production team subsequently planned a four-day trip to Egypt to film the song "Enna Solla Pogirai" with the Giza pyramids as a backdrop; however, the trip turned into a week-long schedule. The first part of the song was shot in Karaikudi with a train in the background. Rajiv Menon and actors Ajith Kumar, Tabu, Raju Sundaram and Ravi K. Chandran travelled daily for three hours from Cairo to film in the heat; one filming day was cancelled after Tabu fainted. Professional Kathakali artists were used for the song "Konjum Mainakale", and the video for "Yengay Yenedhu Kavidhai" was filmed against the backdrop of Chennai's monsoonal rains. Meanwhile, the song "Kannamoochi Yenada" was filmed with the leading cast at Kushaldas Gardens in Chennai. Some scenes featuring Rai were filmed at Menon's flat in Chennai.

Kandukondain Kandukondain was delayed for six months due to the success of Rai's films Taal and Hum Dil De Chuke Sanam, which prompted the revival of other projects she had signed up to in that period. Menon's insistence composer A. R. Rahman reworked some of the music to provide a better fusion of classical and contemporary music also delayed progress. Filming ended six months behind the schedule devised by Menon but according to him, everything happened as planned.

== Soundtrack ==
The songs in Kandukondain Kandukondain were composed by A. R. Rahman and the rights to the soundtrack album were bought by Saregama for a then-record sum of ₹2.2 crore. The soundtrack includes eight songs, one of which is based on a poem written by Subramania Bharati. The audio launch was held at Devi Theatre on 15 March 2000.

"Kannamoochi" is set in the Carnatic raga Nattakurinji. Rajiv Menon, who is a fan of this raga, presented Rahman with the song "Kavalaiyai Theerpathu Naattiya Kalaiye" from Sivakavi (1943) and asked him to compose at least one piece based on the raga. "Kandukondain Kandukondain" is set to the Nalinakanthi raga, "Smayiyai" is based on jazz music, and "Enna Solla Pogirai" is a folksy and romantic song, set to the raga Misra Kirvani. Menon personally asked Shankar Mahadevan to sing the song "Enna Solla Pogirai". Venky of Chennai Online felt the album "is not in the class of `Minsara Kanavu'" calling "Kannamoochi" as the best song of the album and praised other songs but felt "'Konjum Mainakale' by Sadhana Sargam simply doesn't work because the singer seems completely out of sync with the music and her North Indian accent doesn't gel with the song".

Tamil
No.	Title	Lyrics	Singer(s)	Length
1.	"Enna Solla Pogirai"	Vairamuthu	Shankar Mahadevan	6:00
2.	"Kandukondain Kandukondain"	Vairamuthu	Hariharan, Mahalakshmi Iyer	5:22
3.	"Kannamoochi Yenada"	Vairamuthu	K. S. Chithra	4:49
4.	"Suttum Vizhi"	Subramania Bharati	Hariharan	2:21
5.	"Konjum Mainakkale"	Vairamuthu	Sadhana Sargam	4:43
6.	"Kannamoochi Yenada" (Duet)	Vairamuthu	K. S. Chithra, K. J. Yesudas	3:30
7.	"Yengae Enathu Kavithai"	Vairamuthu	K. S. Chitra, Unni Menon	5:15
8.	"Smayiyai"	Vairamuthu	Devan Ekambaram, Clinton Cerejo, Dominique Cerejo	5:09
Total length:				37:09

All lyrics are written by Siva Ganesh.

Telugu
No.	Title	Singer(s)	Length
1.	"Yemi Cheyamanduve"	Shankar Mahadevan	6:02
2.	"Smaiyai"	Devanand Sharma, Clinton Cerejo, Dominique Cerejo	5:12
3.	"Doboochulaatelara"	K. S. Chithra	5:13
4.	"Palike Gorinka"	Sadhana Sargam	4:42
5.	"Thongi Choose"	Hariharan, Mahalakshmi Iyer	5:18
6.	"Yemaaye Naa Kavitha"	K. S. Chithra, Unni Menon	5:17

== Release and reception ==
A function was held to mark the release of the soundtrack to Kandukondain Kandukondain with Kamal Haasan in attendance. The film was initially scheduled for release in the 1999 Diwali season but delays led to the producers announcing it would be released on 1 January 2000, becoming the first film of the new millennium. Further delays due to the success of other films, including Padayappa and Vaalee ensured the film missed that date. The release of Mani Ratnam's Alaipayuthey led to the further postponement of the release of Kandukondain Kandukondain to May 2000.

Kandukondain Kandukondain opened to positive reviews from film critics. The Indian Express stated; "A progressive film encouraging female independence, yet staying a warm family tale in essence, Kandukondain Kandukondain is the kind of film every intelligent movie-goer ought not to miss. Almost every supporting character pitches in an impressive performance, thus making Kandukondain Kandukondain a wonderful watch". In the review for Rediff.com, Shobha Warrier stated although the film has "too many songs, too little emotion", it has "a powerful story with intense and well-developed characters. One of the most poignant scenes in the film is Mammootty's outburst against the system, which forgets war heroes who lay down their lives for a cause." Tamil Star wrote, "Rajiv Menon, who has ideas and vision, has put his heart and soul into this film with broad family appeal and fine performances from the impressive star cast". Krishna Chidambaram of Kalki praised Rajiv Menon for crafting realistic scenes in a poetic manner and also called his strength of making people believe the thought process of characters and also added Ajith, Aishwarya Rai, Tabu, Abbas, A. R. Raghuman and Sujatha have given their contribution without any slip. S. Theodore Bhaskaran of The Hindu wrote "Menon's film works well because it tells a touching tale in an inventive manner and in the process, makes certain important social comments, through well-crafted cinema". The film was a commercial success and completed 150 days at the box office in Tamil Nadu. It was also successful in Kerala. It was initially unsuccessful in Kerala because Mammootty was not promoted as one of the lead artists. Menon chose to take the film to North Indian audiences but refused to dub it to avoid localisation issues, and submitted a final version with English subtitles.

The film was later released by Shyam Shroff of Shringar Films in a limited number cinemas in Mumbai and New Delhi, earning positive reviews from critics and performing well at the box office. Shroff said, "although the film didn't make pots of money ... it created tremendous brand equity". Shobhaa De said the film's "word of mouth was spectacular" and the "reports were consistently good". Outlook gave the film a favourable review and wrote, "This winner of a new-age entertainer is actually a tribute to the 'complete'-ness of the ancient Indian film structure."

Kandukondain Kandukondain was showcased at the Regus London Film Festival in November 2000 and critics from the UK newspaper The Guardian rated it as one of the top-12 films of the event's 270. Critic Peter Bradshaw said it "is an entertaining reinvention of the novel" and that "the richly complicated plot allows it to be exuberantly transposed to modern-day India", ranking it alongside Ang Lee's Crouching Tiger, Hidden Dragon and Cameron Crowe's Almost Famous. Menon continued to show the film across the world, including having screenings at the Washington Film Festival in April 2001, Locarno Film Festival in August 2002 and the Tiburon International Film Festival in March 2004. US-based Kino Films bought the home video rights to the film.

== Accolades ==
2001 National Film Awards

- Won — National Award for Male Playback Singer – Shankar Mahadevan for "Enna Solla Pogirai"

2001 Filmfare Awards South

- Won — Filmfare Award for Best Tamil Film — Kandukondain Kandukondain – Kalaipuli S. Thanu
- Won — Filmfare Award for Best Tamil Director — Rajiv Menon

== Legacy ==
The script of Kandukondain Kandukondain was translated into English and published as a book by Westland Publishers in October 2000. Sanjay Leela Bhansali discussed the possibility of making a Hindi version of the film with Menon. Irrfan Khan held discussions to reprise the role of Major Bala. The project did not go ahead.

Kandukondain Kandukondain became an important film in the careers of Kumar and Rai, showcasing both actors' versatility and ensured their successful careers in cinema. In an interview, Ajith Kumar stated how he understood his true self after acting in the film. The film's songs inspired several film titles: Enge Enadhu Kavithai (2002), Kannamoochi Yenada (2007), Konjum Mainakkale (2012) and Enna Solla Pogirai (2022). The character Anjali in the Telugu film Chi La Sow (2018) was inspired by Tabu's character in Kandukondain Kandukondain.
