= Kadhal Desam =

1996 film directed by Kathir

- Poster
- Directed by: Kathir
- Written by: Kathir
- Produced by: K. T. Kunjumon
- Starring: Vineeth; Abbas; Tabu
- Cinematography: K. V. Anand
- Edited by: B. Lenin; V. T. Vijayan
- Music by: A. R. Rahman
- Production company: Gentleman Film International
- Release date: 23 August 1996
- Running time: 158 minutes
- Country: India
- Language: Tamil

Kadhal Desam (/kɑːðəl ðeɪsəm/ transl. Country of love) is a 1996 Indian Tamil-language teen romance film written and directed by Kathir and produced by K. T. Kunjumon. The film stars Vineeth, Abbas and Tabu. This marked Abbas's feature debut and Tabu's Tamil debut. The supporting cast includes S. P. Balasubrahmanyam, Vadivelu, Chinni Jayanth and Srividya. K. V. Anand was the cinematographer and A. R. Rahman composed the music. Kadhal Desam released on 23 August 1996 and became a box-office success. It was unofficial remake in Bangladesh name "Narir Mon (Woman Heart)" starring Shakil Khan, Shabnur, Riaz directed by Motin Rahman

== Plot ==
A traditional rivalry has always existed between the students of Pachaiyappa's and Loyola colleges in Chennai. Karthik is a poor orphan who studies at Pachaiyappa's, a hobo in a rented room, travels by the bus, hangs out with a number of friends, and is the captain of his football team. He is also a good poet and daydreams about his dream girl. Arun, by contrast, comes from a wealthy family, studies at Loyola, drives his own car, hangs out with numerous friends. He too is the captain of the college football team. In a nasty intercollege riot, Arun saves Karthik's life. In return, Karthik lets Arun win in a football game because he thinks Arun cannot take losses easily. Arun soon realises that the victory is because of Karthik's sacrifice.

They become friends, setting a good example of friendship to others in their respective college. Things go well until they meet a new girl Divya who studies at Stella Maris. Both Arun and Karthik fall in love with her, but neither realises that the other also loves the same girl. Following a sequence of events, when they realise that both in love with the same girl, their friendship is strained, and they fight with each other. At the end, Divya says that she likes them both and doesn't want to accept one while hurting the other. So she decides to continue their bond only as a platonic friendship.

== Cast ==
- Vineeth as Karthik
- Abbas as Arun
- Tabu as Divya
- S. P. Balasubrahmanyam as Divya's father
- Srividya as Divya's mother
- Vadivelu as Wilson
- Chinni Jayanth as Shiva
- Kevin Erik Gray as Kevin
- Joseph as Kevin's friend
- Adithya as Kevin's friend
- Yasin as Kevin's friend
- Dinesh as Kevin's friend
- Jyothi as Divya's lecturer
- Priyanka as Mary (uncredited role)
- Chaplin Balu as Wilson's friend (uncredited role)
- K. T. Kunjumon as Director general of police (cameo appearance)
- Vasudevan Baskaran as himself (cameo appearance)
- Japan Kumar (cameo appearance in the song "Hello Doctor")

== Production ==
=== Development ===
Kathir, while writing a script, "wanted some drama rather than plain love and so wrote a story of warring colleges and two boys in them". He narrated a five-minute plot summary to K. T. Kunjumon, who was impressed with it and insisted Kathir to change the film's title to Kadhal Desam from Kalloori Saalai (transl. College road). The film also took inspiration from the real-life rivalry between Pachaiyappa's College and Loyola College.

=== Casting ===
Abbas, then a Mumbai-based model, was in Bangalore on vacation and hanging out at a cybercafé near Brigade Road, when he bumped into Kathir, who asked him to act in his Tamil film. Initially reluctant due to his limited knowledge of Tamil, he declined and left for Mumbai. A year later, Abbas received a call from Kunjumon asking him to come over for a screen test as a result of Kathir's insistence. Vineeth was signed on to play another lead role in the film due to his association with Kunjumon, having previously worked in the 1993 Shankar-directed film, Gentleman. Tabu was signed on to make her debut in Tamil films and worked on the film alongside Mani Ratnam's Iruvar. Then struggling actor Vikram had dubbed his voice for Abbas, while Sekar dubbed the voice for Vineeth and Saritha for Tabu. A. Karunakaran, who became a successful director in Telugu cinema, started his career as a clap assistant with this film.

=== Filming ===
Kathir mentioned that he dreamt of a "beautiful place full of young people" and was inspired by College Road in Chennai, with a setting by the beach which formed as "opening visual idea" for the film. Since it did not exist, he ordered it to be created for the film, costing ₹1 crore (equivalent to ₹6.0 crore or US$640,000 in 2026). Kadhal Desam is the first Tamil film for cinematographer K. V. Anand. Vineeth has stated that Anand, unlike other Indian cinematographers, was able to mold actors, and would offer suggestions to him and Abbas during filming. Significant portions of the song "O Vennila" were shot at a beach from 4:00 am till sunrise at 6:00 am, over the course of 10 days. Filming took place in and around the cities of Chennai, Bangalore, Ooty, Mudumalai, Bandipur, Mumbai and Vishakhapatnam. Raju Sundaram was originally chosen as the dance choreographer, but during the shoot of the song "Hello Doctor", he had to attend another shoot. Therefore, his assistant Cool Jayanth did the clash work for the song. Kathir, who was impressed with his sincerity, promised him to make him a proper choreographer. Jayanth ended up choreographing the songs "Ennai Kaanavillaiye", "Kalloori Saalai" and "Thendrale".

== Soundtrack ==
The soundtrack for the film was composed by A. R. Rahman, with lyrics by Vaali. The soundtrack was also released in Telugu as Prema Desam, with lyrics by Bhuvana Chandra and in Hindi with the title Duniya Dilwalon Ki, with lyrics written by Mehboob and P. K. Mishra.

Kathir revealed that the first song to be recorded was "Kalloori Saalai", he wanted it to be a fast number, but wanted it to start the song "with a melodious line". Rahman asked for a dummy lyric for it which started with "Inbathai karuvakkinal penn", which Vaali liked and retained it for the final cut as well.

For the song "Musthafa Musthafa", Kathir wanted a song on the lines of an old song "Paravaigal Palavitham", which was about friendship. Rahman gave him the tune during a flight journey which Kathir liked it.

=== Kadhal Desam - (Tamil) ===
| Song | Singer(s) | Length |
|---|---|---|
| "Ennai Kaanavillaiye (Anbe Anbe)" | S. P. Balasubrahmanyam, O. S. Arun, Rafee | 5:40 |
| "Hello Doctor" | A. R. Rahman, Storms, Noel James, Anupama | 6:14 |
| "Kalloori Salai" | A. R. Rahman, Hariharan, Aslam Mustafa | 5:25 |
| "Mustafa Mustafa" | A. R. Rahman | 6:05 |
| "Thendrale" | Mano, Unni Krishnan, Dominique Cerejo | 6:33 |
| "O Vennila" | Unni Krishnan | 4:54 |

=== Prema Desam - (Telugu) ===
| Song | Singer(s) | Length |
|---|---|---|
| "Prema Prema" | S. P. Balasubrahmanyam, O. S. Arun | 5:40 |
| "Hello Doctor" | KK, Srinivas, Anupama, Noel James | 6:14 |
| "College Style" | S.P. Balasubrahmanyam, KK, Hariharan | 5:25 |
| "Mustafa" | A. R. Rahman | 6:05 |
| "Vennela" | Unni Krishnan, Mano | 6:33 |
| "O Vennela" | Unni Krishnan | 4:54 |

=== Duniya Dilwalon Ki - (Hindi) ===
| Song | Singer(s) | Length |
|---|---|---|
| "Jaana Jaana" | S. P. Balasubrahmanyam | 5:40 |
| "Hello Doctor" | KK, Storms, Noel James | 6:14 |
| "College Ke Saathi" | Hariharan, KK, Aslam Mustafa | 5:25 |
| "Mustafa" | A. R. Rahman | 6:05 |
| "Jaari Jaa E Hawa" | S. P. Balasubrahmanyam, Sonu Nigam, Dominique Cerejo | 6:33 |
| "O Meri Jaan" | Sonu Nigam | 4:54 |

== Release and reception ==
Kadhal Desam was released on 23 August 1996. D. S. Ramanujam from The Hindu wrote "Grandiose trappings in the form of giant sets, never before erected on such a scale in an Indian movie, offer a fitting backdrop for a love story. R. P. R. of Kalki praised Rahman's music, Anand's cinematography and grand sets but panned Abbas's acting, unnecessary villain track and Kunjumon's acting attempt. Regarding the Hindi dubbed version, a critic from The Indian Express wrote that "It is Tabu’s lively performance that holds the film together".

The film's initial response was average as audience found the second half to be boring which prompted Kunjumon to approach editor B. Lenin who managed to re-edit the film especially trimming the length of the climax fight, and the film became a large commercial success. Rahman won his fifth consecutive Filmfare Award for Best Music Director – Tamil, and Anand received the Screen Award South for Best Cinematography.

== Other versions ==
Kadhal Desam was dubbed and released in Telugu as Prema Desam and became an equally big success. The Hindi dubbed version, Duniya Dilwalon Ki, however, did not perform as well. The film was remade in Bangladeshi Bengali as Narir Mon (2000).

== Legacy ==
The climax of Kadhal Desam broke a taboo in the Tamil film industry, where a love triangle would be decided with a happy ending. Post-success, Abbas revealed that he felt that "Mustafa Mustafa" song catapulted him to stardom and enjoyed a strong female base after Kadhal Desam. The success of the film prompted Rahman to collaborate with Kathir again in Kadhalar Dhinam (1999) and Kadhal Virus (2002). Out of respect for his first film's director, Abbas made a guest appearance in the latter film. The film kicked off a string of youth-based stories in films with Minsara Kanavu and Ullaasam featuring similar story lines.

== In popular culture ==
"Kalluri Saalai" and the instrumental theme of the song and flowers falling on the road were parodied in Tamizh Padam 2 (2018). "Mustafa Mustafa" inspired the title of two films: a 2024 film was based on the lyric "Nanban Oruvan Vantha Piragu" (transl. After a friend came) and a 2026 film.
