= Shanti Shanti Shanti =

- Directed by: T. B. Srinivas
- Written by: T. B. Srinivas
- Produced by: Sanjay Desai; Ashit Desai
- Starring: Abbas; Madhavan; Prakash Raj; Prema; Avni Vasa; Satish Shah
- Cinematography: P. C. Sriram
- Edited by: P. Sai Suresh
- Music by: Sandeep Chowta
- Production company: Geethanjali Movies
- Release date: 20 November 1998
- Country: India
- Language: Kannada

Shanti Shanti Shanti is a 1998 Indian Kannada-language film directed by Srinivas. The film starred Abbas, Madhavan, Prakash Raj, Prema, Avni Vasa, and Satish Shah in leading roles. During production, the film became known for its series of innovative ideas in the Kannada film industry. It became the first film to have a website and a six-track DTS sound. The film, which featured cinematography from P. C. Sriram, released on 20 November 1998, and was a box office failure. Despite this, it was later dubbed into the Tamil language as Relax.

== Plot ==
Two siblings live with their father who refuses to give them money to pursue their goals. They befriend Raju, a poor man, who promises to help them achieve their dreams.

== Cast ==
- Abbas as Raju
- Madhavan as Siddhartha
- Prema as Suzy
- Prakash Raj as Ganga Prasad
- Satish Shah as Anantha Murthy
- Sumithra as Raju's aunt
- Sudha Belawadi as Bank Manager
- Avni as Shanthi
- Sihi Kahi Chandru as cook
- Vichithra
- Sunil Raoh as one of band members (uncredited)
- Harish Raj as one of mechanics (uncredited)

== Production ==
The director of the film, T. B. Srinivas, an erstwhile assistant director to Mani Ratnam, collaborated with former state cricketer Sanjay Desai, a distributor and theatre-owner, to produce a film on the youngsters of Bangalore and the idea soon started the film. Srinivas claimed he was inspired by two incidents — the kidnapping of a rich businessman by young thugs from Uttar Pradesh who were attracted by Bangalore's reputation as a fast-growing city with rich men and relaxed policemen and the case of four city girls running away for a week with a man who promised to help them fulfill their ambitions — in order to write the story.

The film became the first Kannada film for prominent cinematographer P. C. Sreeram whilst noted composer Sandeep Chowta was the music director. The film was notable for becoming the first Kannada language film to have a website for the film. The move happened on the initiative of the director, T. B. Srinivas, although the practice failed to set a trend in the industry.

== Soundtrack ==
The music was composed by Sandeep Chowta.

Shanti Shanti Shanti

Soundtrack album by Sandeep Chowta
- Released: 1998
- Recorded: 1998
- Genre: Soundtrack
- Length: 26:49
- Language: Kannada
- Labels: Venus Worldwide Entertainment (Kannada); Magnasound (Tamil)
- Producer: Sandeep Chowta

=== Kannada ===
All lyrics are written by K. Kalyan.

Track list
No.	Title	Singer(s)	Length
1.	"Bangalore Huduga"	Rajesh Krishnan	4:34
2.	"Shanti Shanti"	Sanjeev, Allwyn, Sowmya Raoh	4:38
3.	"Imbiya Hanna"	Rajesh Krishnan, Sanjeevani, L. N. Shastri	4:26
4.	"Elayay"	Rajesh Krishnan, Sowmya Raoh	6:01
5.	"Takka Takka Dhimi"	Rajesh Krishnan, Sujatha Mohan, Sanjeev	4:14
6.	"Theme Music"	Instrumental	2:56
Total length:			26:49

=== Tamil ===
Tamil version had additional song "You Relax Baby" which was composed by Swararaj.

All lyrics are written by Vaali.

Track list
No.	Title	Singer(s)	Length
1.	"Thakathimi Thakathimi"	Harini, Mano	4:11
2.	"You Relax Baby"	Srinivas, Anuradha Sriram	4:28
3.	"Kannile Kaadhal"	P. Unnikrishnan, Swarnalatha	5:56
4.	"Jimbale Jimbale"	Mano, Swarnalatha	4:34
5.	"Paadiko Don't Care"	Srinivas	4:25
Total length:			23:34

== Release ==
Upon release, the film became a financial failure for the producers. However, after the success of the Tamil film Alai Payuthey (2000) in which this film's supporting actor Madhavan, played the lead role, the producers of Shanti Shanti Shanti opted to dub the film into Tamil as Relax. Actress Avni was given the stage name of Harini for the Tamil version, while composer Sandeep became Swaraj. Both lead actors threatened legal action, with Madhavan unhappy that a film in which he portrayed a supporting role would hamper his career in Tamil films, whilst Abbas was unhappy that the promoters were ignoring him. He also threatened action claiming that the producers owed him money.

== Critical response ==
Srikanth Srinivasa of Deccan Herald felt the film was a "clean, entertaing [sic]" one. Of the acting performances, he wrote, "Abbas is endearing. Avni is attractive. Prema is pretty and Madhavan is peppy. The casting of Satish Shah is unjustified. Prakash Rai outshines all the artistes with his natural performance as a rustic dhaba owner resembling Laloo Prasad Yadav." While he also commended the cinematography, music and playback singing in the film, he felt the film faltered on dubbing and editing, in that "the second half could have been trimmed". India Today wrote, "With some good humour, delightful musical score and refreshing young acting talent, Shanthi! Shanthi! Shanthi! is a welcome break from the routine masala fare". Reviewing Relax, Rediff.com wrote, "The technical team is power-packed, with P C Sriram's camera creating the right mood for the feisty flick. Much of the fun in a film of this kind is the dialogues, and Ravee delivers, with clever, fun-packed lines. The direction is clean and assured, no obvious bets are missed, and the pace and suspense never allowed to flag".
