= List of songs recorded by Chandrika Gururaj =

Chandrika Gururaj (born 4 October 1959), is an Indian playback singer, known for her works in Kannada. Apart from film songs, she has also recorded numerous devotional, bhaavageethe and folk songs. For her song "O Priyatama" in the movie Urvashi, Chandrika won the Karnataka State Film Award for Best Female Playback Singer in 1994. Karnataka Government honoured her with the Karnataka Rajyotsava Award for her contribution to music, in 2010.

== Kannada ==
- All songs are in Kannada

Year	Film	Song	Music	Co-singers
1989	Indrajith	"Kadalige Ondu Koneyide"	Hamsalekha	S. P. Balasubrahmanyam
1989	Singari Bangari	"Udaya Shashiya"	Hamsalekha	S. P. Balasubrahmanyam
1989	Narasimha	"Budabudaki"	Hamsalekha	B. R. Chaya, Hamsalekha, Shivaraj, Jaipal, Ravi, Krishnamurthy, Sumana
1990	Hosa Jeevana	"Anatha Maguvade"	Hamsalekha	K. J. Yesudas
1990	Abhimanyu	"Kele Kele Baratha Mathe"	Hamsalekha	K. J. Yesudas
1990	Sididedda Shiva	"Sindhoora"	Hamsalekha	B. K. Sumitra, Kasturi Shankar, B. R. Chaya, Latha Hamsalekha
1990	Prathap	"Ee Jogada Jalapatha"	Hamsalekha	S. P. Balasubrahmanyam
1990	Prathap	"Prema Baraha Koti Taraha"	Hamsalekha	S. P. Balasubrahmanyam
1990	Ajagajantara	"Thattona Thattona"	Hamsalekha	S. P. Balasubrahmanyam
1990	Ajagajantara	"Dooradalli"	Hamsalekha	S. P. Balasubrahmanyam
1990	Aavesha	"Sapthaswarada Madhuram"	Hamsalekha	S. P. Balasubrahmanyam
1990	Mathe Haditu Kogile	"Baa Nanna Sangeetha"	Rajan–Nagendra	S. P. Balasubrahmanyam
1990	Shivashankar	"Kila Kila Nagutha Baaro"	Rajan–Nagendra	Vishnuvardhan, Manjula Gururaj
1990	Suthradhari	"Kalla Kalla"	V. Manohar	L. N. Shastry
1990	Rudra Tandava	"Collegu Mettilu"	Upendra Kumar	Mano, Manjula Gururaj, Madhu, Rama Aravind
1991	S. P. Bhargavi	"Mamarake Ee Kogileya"	Hamsalekha	L. N. Shastry
1991	Bhujangayyana Dashavathara	"Neenolidare Jaga"	Hamsalekha	Venkata Raghavan
1991	Garuda Dwaja	"Oh Cheluve - Bit"	Hamsalekha	S. P. Balasubrahmanyam
1991	Nayakkagi Saval	"Honnase Kanasella"	Manoranjan Prabhakar	S. P. Balasubrahmanyam
1991	Kiladi Gandu	"Banda Namma Ganapanna"	Manoranjan Prabhakar	S. P. Balasubrahmanyam
1991	Shwethagni	"Inde Taane Nalku"	Manoranjan Prabhakar	B. R. Chaya
1991	C. B. I. Shiva	"Hidiva Sooryanna"	Upendra Kumar	Sangeetha Katti, Shreenath, L. N. Shastry, Kusuma, Gururaj
1992	Nagu Naguta Nali	"Ninna Kaanalu"	Rajan–Nagendra	P. Jayachandran
1992	Mallige Hoove	"Preeti Maador Madya"	Hamsalekha	K. J. Yesudas
1992	Chaitrada Premanjali	"Chaitrada Premanjaliya"	Hamsalekha	S. P. Balasubrahmanyam
1992	Hosa Kalla Hale Kulla	"Rani Illa Gurani Illa"	Hamsalekha	Rajesh Krishnan
1992	Tharle Nan Maga	"Sangeetha Kalisikodi"	V. Manohar	L. N Shastry, Upendra, V. Manohar
1992	Tharle Nan Maga	"Hing Yaake Nee Noduthi"	V. Manohar	
1992	Ganesha Subramanya	"Break The Age"	V. Manohar	
1992	Alli Ramachari Illi Brahmachari	"Banda Banda Ramayya"	V. Manohar	L. N Shastry
1992	Bhanda Nanna Ganda	"O Mahilamanigale Keli"	V. Manohar	Jaggesh
1992	Malashree Mamashree	"Yarigu Thale Taggisabeda"	Raj–Koti	Manjula Gururaj
1992	Malashree Mamashree	"Baro Nanna"	Raj–Koti	S. P. Balasubrahmanyam, Manjula Gururaj
1992	Gili Bete	"Yaava Chinte"	Manoranjan Prabhakar	Vinod Raj, Manoranjan Prabhakar
1993	Hosa Love Story	"O Malenadina"	Vijayanand	Rajesh Krishnan, Gangotri Rangaswamy
1993	Ranjitha	"Eniddarenu Hennada Balika"	Agasthya	
1993	Shhh!	"Avanalli Ivalilli"	Sadhu Kokila	L. N. Shastry
1993	Love Training	"Pippipiya"	V. Manohar	L. N. Shastry, Suma Shastry, Seema
1993	Chukki Chandrama	"Preethiyo Premavo"	Upendra Kumar	Srinath
1993	Bhagavan Sri Saibaba	"Shivaya Parameshvaraya"	Upendra Kumar, Hamsalekha	Rajesh Krishnan
1993	Kadambari	"Prathama Chumbana"	Hamsalekha	Rajesh Krishnan
1993	Bevu Bella	"Devarigondu Kagada"	Hamsalekha	Rajesh Krishnan
1993	Apoorva Jodi	"Anna Banda"	Hamsalekha	Mano
1993	Sarakarakke Saval	"Mavayya Mavayya"	Hamsalekha	S. P. Balasubrahmanyam, Manjula Gururaj, Mangala Anjan
1993	Kollura Sri Mookambika	"Thillana"	K. V. Mahadevan	Manjula Paramesh
1994	Vijaya Kankana	"Muthu Kodu Baaro"	Amarapriya	
1994	Rashmi	"Vidhi Aatavanu"	Agasthya	
1994	Mahashakthi Maaye	"Nambike Daivadalirisu"	Hemanth Kumar	
1994	Indrana Gedda Narendra	"Shubhadina Naaga Panchami"	V. Manohar	L. N. Shastry
1994	Indrana Gedda Narendra	"One Two Three"	V. Manohar	S. P. Balasubrahmanyam
1994	Looti Gang	"Oh Madhuchandra"	V. Manohar	S. P. Balasubrahmanyam
1994	Thooguve Krishnana	"Oh Chandamaama"(Female)	Manoranjan Prabhakar	K. S. Chithra
1994	Thooguve Krishnana	"Oh Chandamaama"(Male)	Manoranjan Prabhakar	K. J. Yesudas
1994	Kotreshi Kanasu	"Haari Haari Baanari"	C. Ashwath	B. R. Chaya, Archana Udupa, Surekha
1995	Ravi Theja	"Sobagina Vayasina"	Sax Raja	
1995	Ravi Theja	"Hrudaya Haadi"	Sax Raja	S. P. Balasubrahmanyam
1995	Jeevana Maithri	"Hunnimeya Chandrano"	Raja Hamsa	S. P. Balasubrahmanyam
1995	Anuraga Sangama	"Sangama Sangama"	V. Manohar	S. P. Balasubrahmanyam
1995	Anuraga Sangama	"O Banduve"	V. Manohar	
1995	Urvashi	"Oh Priyathama"	V. Manohar	
1995	Beladingala Baale	"Nenapugala Angaladi"	Guna Singh	
1995	Mangalya Sakshi	"Sarva Mangala Mangalye"	Sadhu Kokila	
1995	Mangalya Sakshi	"Namsthulasi Kalyani"	Sadhu Kokila	
1995	Mangalya Sakshi	"Lambodara Lakumikara"	Sadhu Kokila	
1995	Mangalya Sakshi	"Malagu Magale"	Sadhu Kokila	
1995	Thavaru Beegaru	"Bhale Bhale Jodi"	Sadhu Kokila	Rajesh Krishnan, L. N. Shastry, Sujatha Dutt
1995	Maha Chathura	"Beeside Gaali"	Madan Mallu	L. N. Shastry
1995	Maha Chathura	"Sokkalli Mereva"	Madan Mallu	Rajesh Krishnan
1995	Shubha Lagna	"Aha Enu Chanda"	Rajesh Ramnath	Rajesh Krishnan
1996	Mane Mane Ramayana	"Mane Mane Ramayana"	Sadguna Raj	Rajesh Krishnan
1996	Mane Mane Ramayana	"Ide Kanna Nota"	Sadguna Raj	Rajesh Krishnan
1996	Mane Mane Ramayana	"Cheluvina Ghaniyu Nee"	Sadguna Raj	Rajesh Krishnan
1996	Mane Mane Ramayana	"Oh Priya Baa"	Sadguna Raj	Rajesh Krishnan
1996	Mane Mane Ramayana	"Manasu Manasu"	Sadguna Raj	Rajesh Krishnan
1996	Annavra Makkalu	"Hogabeda Hudugi"	Rajesh Ramnath	Rajesh Krishnan
1996	Nirbandha	"Nanna Ninna Prema"	Rajesh Ramnath	Rajesh Krishnan, Sujatha Dutt
1996	Veera Bhadra	"Halappa Halappa"	Hamsalekha	Rajesh Krishnan, Sulochana, Latha Hamsalekha
1996	Sakalakala Vallabha	"Udaya Raviyu"	V. Manohar	Rajesh Krishnan, L. N. Shastry, Nalini Kamath
1997	Yudha	"Hello Hello Tikilona"	V. Manohar	S. P. Balasubrahmanyam
1997	Yudha	"Shiva Shiva"	V. Manohar	S. P. Balasubrahmanyam
1997	Manava 2022	"Hero Hero"	Nanda(Laya Kokila)	Rajesh Krishnan
1997	Mahabharatha	"Basinga Katkonde"	K. Kalyan	Sadhu Kokila, V. Manohar, Rajesh Ramnath, K. Kalyan, L. N. Shastry
1997	Baalina Daari	"Kodanda Rama"	K. Kalyan	Rajesh Krishnan, Manjula Gururaj, L. N. Shastry, Mangala Anjan
1997	Ganesha I Love U	"Avane Nanna Hero"	Rajesh Ramanath	Manjula Gururaj
1997	Ammavra Ganda	"Uma Rama"	Raj	Rajesh Krishnana, Manjula Gururaj, Raj
1997	Prema Raga Haadu Gelathi	"Lalanamani"	Ilaiyaraaja	S. P. Balasubrahmanyam, Gangadhar
1997	Prema Raga Haadu Gelathi	"Baa Baare O Gelathi"	Ilaiyaraaja	S. P. Balasubrahmanyam
1997	Prema Raga Haadu Gelathi	Baa Baare O Gelathi (Bit)	Ilaiyaraaja	S. P. Balasubrahmanyam
