= Ranganna =

1997 Kannada romantic action drama directed by H. Vasu

- VCD cover
- Directed by: H. Vasu
- Written by: J. M. Prahalad (dialogues)
- Screenplay by: H. Vasu
- Story by: H. Vasu
- Produced by: Sa Ra Govindaraju
- Starring: Jaggesh; Vijayalakshmi; Srinath; Kavitha; Loknath; Dheerendra Gopal
- Cinematography: J. G. Krishna
- Edited by: Shyam Yadav
- Music by: Rajesh Ramanath
- Production company: Thanu Chithra
- Release date: 1997
- Running time: 131 minutes
- Country: India
- Language: Kannada

Ranganna is a 1997 Indian Kannada-language romantic action film written and directed by H. Vasu. The film stars Jaggesh as an auto driver, Ranga, who tries to mend the broken relationship of his uncle with the help of Roopa by reuniting him with his stubborn wife who happens to be Roopa's mother. Vijayalakshmi plays Ranga's love interest, Roopa. Srinath, Kavitha, Dheerendra Gopal and Loknath essayed other important roles. Rajesh Ramanath composed the soundtrack whileJ. G. Krishna handled the cinematography.

The film marks the first collaboration of director H. Vasu with music director Rajesh Ramanath and second collaboration with Jaggesh and producer Sa Ra Govindaraju after Bhanda Alla Bahaddur which was released in the same year.

The film received a U certificate from the CBFC without any cuts on 7 October 1997. Sri Ganesh Videos acquired the video rights and released and marketed the film in VCD and DVD formats.

== Cast ==
- Jaggesh as Ranga
- Vijayalakshmi as Roopa
- Srinath
- Kavitha
- Loknath
- Dheerendra Gopal
- Harish Rai
- Honnavalli Krishna
- Bank Janardhan
- M. S. Karanth
- M. N. Lakshmi Devi
- Shani Mahadevappa
- Michael Madhu

== Production ==
Despite media reports that Jaggesh and Vijayalakshmi, then aged 18–20, broke out into a fight at that time, Vijayalakshmi denied the reports in 2024.

== Soundtrack ==
Ranganna

Soundtrack album by Rajesh Ramanath
- Released: 1997
- Recorded: 1997
- Studio: Maruthi
- Genre: Feature film soundtrack
- Length: 22
- Language: Kannada
- Label: Lahari Music

Rajesh Ramanath chronology
Jennina Hole (1997)	Ranganna (1997)	Jaidev (1998)

The soundtrack album comprises 5 songs composed by Rajesh Ramanath. The audio rights of the film was sold to Lahari Music.

1. "Auto Auto" — sung by S. P. Balasubrahmanyam; lyrics by S. R. Shastry
2. "Bandlu Bandlu" — sung by Rajesh Krishnan and Soumya; lyrics by Shyamsundar Kulkarni
3. "Baaro Baaro" — sung by Rajesh Krishnan and K. S. Chithra; lyrics by Doddarangegowda
4. "Mangoli Mangol" — sung by Rajesh Krishnan and Soumya; lyrics by K. Kalyan
5. "Aajare Aaja" — sung by Rajesh Krishnan and K. S. Chithra; lyrics by Sri Ranga
