= Mari Kannu Hori Myage =

1998 Kannada comedy film directed by Kumar

- Directed by: Kumar
- Written by: Kumar; Ra Prakash Thrishuli
- Produced by: K. C. Nagamani; A. Keshava; A. Narasimha; Keshava Prasad; Yashodha Prasad
- Starring: Jaggesh; Archana; Utthara; Dheerendra Gopal
- Cinematography: Sundarnath Suvarna
- Edited by: T. Shashikumar
- Music by: Rajesh Ramanath
- Production company: Best Films
- Release date: 4 September 1998
- Running time: 133 minutes
- Country: India
- Language: Kannada

Mari Kannu Hori Myage also spelled as Maari Kannu Hori Myaage (transl. Maari's eyes are on the Bull) is a 1998 Indian Kannada-language comedy film starring Jaggesh, Archana, Utthara and Dheerendra Gopal. The film edited by T. Shashikumar has soundtrack scored by Rajesh Ramanath and cinematography handled by Sundarnath Suvarna. The film upon release met with positive reception.

The film written and directed by Kumar was named after a famous track from the Kannada film A released in the same year. The movie humorously deals with the troubles of a man from a middle-class family who becomes the victim of a slight misunderstanding.

== Cast ==
- Jaggesh as Vaikunta, Annaiah's elder son
- Archana as Soundarya
- Utthara
- Dheerendra Gopal as Annaiah
- Tennis Krishna as Kailasa, Annaiah's second son
- Papamma
- Anuradha
- Honnavalli Krishna
- M. S. Umesh
- Bank Janardhan
- Kote Prabhakar as Prabhakar
- Venkatesh
- Reena
- Ravi
- Sindhu Menon as Annaiah's daughter
- Mithun Tejasvi

== Soundtrack ==
Mari Kannu Hori Myage

Soundtrack album by Rajesh Ramanath
- Released: 1998
- Genre: Feature film soundtrack
- Length: 25:30
- Language: Kannada
- Label: Lahari Music

Rajesh Ramanath chronology
Baro Nanna Muddina Krishna (1998)	Mari Kannu Hori Myage (1998)	Veerappa Nayaka (1999)

No.	Track	Singers	Lyrics	Length
1.	Matthade Besara Ade Sanje	Rajesh Krishnan, Sowmya Raoh	K. S. Nissar Ahmad	2:53
2.	Brahmange Thalkettu	S. P. Balasubrahmanyam	Prakash Thrishuli	3:44
3.	Love Madutthenatha	Rajesh Krishnan; Soumya Raoh	Prakash Thrishuli	4:32
4.	Podeyali Kedige	Soumya Raoh	Prakash Thrishuli	4:57
5.	Henda Sarayi Thanni	B. Jayashree	Bhangi Ranga	4:52
6.	Shishira Shinchana Ee Prema	Badari Prasad; Sujatha	Prakash Thrishuli	4:27

== Reception ==
Srikanth Srinivasa of Deccan Herald felt the audience would fail to understand what director Kumar "is trying to convey" with this film. He added, "Kumar, in trying to be different, has neither made good use of the story at his disposal nor has he capitalised on Jaggesh's screen presence, leaving the audience totally at sea." About the acting performances, he wrote, ""Jaggesh is as usual in his element... Uttara has nothing much to do. Dhirendra Gopal is wasted. The dialogues are loud, vulgar and unparliamentary. Papamma is a delight, though her dialogues are atrocious."

== See also ==
- Tarle Nan Maga
- Jagath Kiladi
- Melkote Manja
