= Jipuna Nanna Ganda =

Indian Kannada-language comedy drama film

- VCD cover
- Directed by: J. G. Krishna
- Written by: Srichandru (dialogue)
- Screenplay by: J. G. Krishna
- Based on: Budget Padmanabhan (Tamil)
- Produced by: N Srinivas
- Starring: Jaggesh; Ravali; Kruthika
- Cinematography: J. G. Krishna
- Edited by: Rajashekhar Reddy
- Music by: Sadhu Kokila
- Production company: Sushma Films
- Release date: 9 May 2001
- Country: India
- Language: Kannada

Jipuna Nanna Ganda (transl. My husband is a cheapstake) is a 2001 Indian Kannada-language comedy drama film directed by J. G. Krishna and starring Jaggesh, Ravali and Kruthika. The film was a remake of the Tamil film Budget Padmanabhan (2000).

== Cast ==
- Jaggesh as Padmanabh
- Ravali
- Kruthika
- Umashree
- Ashalatha
- M. N. Lakshmi Devi
- Mukhyamantri Chandru
- Shivaram
- Shani Mahadevappa
- Ashok
- Sadhu Kokila as Vikram
- Bank Janardhan
- Vaijanath Biradar
- Yathiraj Jaggesh
- Komal Kumar

== Production ==
This film marked Jaggesh's third collaboration with his classmate J. G. Krishna after Drona and Nannaseya Hoove (both 1999). This was the first time he worked with J. G. Krishna as a director as Krishna previously worked with him as a cinematographer.

== Music ==
The music was composed by Sadhu Kokila.

Track listing
No.	Title	Lyrics	Singer(s)	Length
1.	"Budgetettu Budgettu"	Srichandru	Manu
2.	"Kanasina Hakki"	Srichandru	Unni Krishnan
3.	"Manase Manase"	V. Manohar	Nanditha, Rajesh Krishnan
4.	"O Santhoshada"	Srichandru	Jaggesh, Nanditha, Sadhu Kokila
5.	"Dham Are Dham"	V. Manohar	Anuradha Sriram, Rajesh Krishnan
6.	"Yellello Swartha"	Srichandru	Srinivas

== Box office ==
The film was a box office success and ran for a hundred days, thereby becoming the first Jaggesh film to do so in his nearly twenty-year-old career.
