= Jagath Kiladi =

1998 film by Chikkanna

- Video Cover
- Directed by: Chikkanna
- Story by: K. Bhagyaraj
- Based on: Avasara Police 100 (1990 Tamil film)
- Produced by: Sudha Srinivasan
- Starring: Jaggesh; Charulatha; Pavithra Lokesh
- Cinematography: Ramesh Babu
- Edited by: B. S. Kemparaj
- Music by: Rajan–Nagendra
- Production companies: S&S Cinema
- Release date: 1998
- Running time: 130 minutes
- Country: India
- Language: Kannada

Jagath Kiladi (transl. Ultimate Player) is a 1998 Indian Kannada language action comedy film starring Jaggesh, Charulatha and Pavithra Lokesh in the lead roles. The film produced by Sudha Srinivasan for S&S Cinemas was directed by Chikkanna. The film is a remake of the Tamil film Avasara Police 100. The then popular comedian Sarigama Viji who also played a supporting character penned the dialogues. The film has a musical score by Rajan–Nagendra.

Actor Jaggesh appeared in two roles, one as a timid and dim-witted cop and the other as a smart, witty and courageous ex-convict. B. S. Kemparaj edited the film while Ramesh Babu handled the cinematography. The film was a moderate success at the box office.

== Synopsis ==
Vijay, an honest but timid Head Constable is ridiculed by everyone around him including his son. His superior Sub Inspector Thirupathi is an equally incompetent officer. Meanwhile, Bhaskar a hardened criminal is released after 14 years and reunites with his mother. He is shocked to learn that his supposedly dead father is still alive and has grown to be a dangerous criminal. While his mother was pregnant Bhaskar's father, Dharmaraj, who was an honest person, robbed a temple and killed someone in the process. Bhaskar is disturbed and tries to avenge his wrongdoings. In the process, he comes across Thirupathi who mistakes him for Vijay and persuades him to catch a criminal. While Thirupathi gets a transfer to Raichur, a clueless Vijay is promoted to Sub Inspector post for Bhaskar's brave deed. Bhaskar has already learned about his dim-witted look alike and decides to use the situation to his benefit and what happens later forms the crux of the story.

== Cast ==
- Jaggesh
- Charulatha
- Pavithra Lokesh
- B. V. Radha
- M. N. Lakshmi Devi
- Loknath
- Shani Mahadevappa
- G. K. Govinda Rao
- Nagaraj Kote
- Sudheer
- Sathyajith
- Agro Chikkanna
- Stunt Devu
- Mandya Ramesh
- Sarigama Viji

== Soundtrack ==
Jagath Kiladi

Soundtrack album by Rajan–Nagendra
- Released: 1998
- Genre: Feature film soundtrack
- Language: Kannada
- Label: Lahari Music

Rajan–Nagendra chronology
Hrudayanjali (1998)	Jagath Kiladi (1998)	Prema Prema Prema (1998)

The Rajan–Nagendra duo scored and composed the film's soundtrack while Narendra Babu, Geethapriya, J. M. Prahlad and Shyamsundar Kulkarni penned the lyrics.

1. "Sundaraangi" by S. P. B.
2. "Musukeththabeda" by S. P. B., Anuradha Sriram
3. "Jokumara Jodiyagi" by S. P. B., Anuradha Sriram
4. "I Love for you" by Jaggesh, Anuradha Sriram

== Release ==
The film was released in 1998 to positive reviews. The film received a U Certificate after 3 cuts from the Bangalore regional office of censor board with the certificate dated 22 June 1998.
