= Mangalya (film) =

- Directed by: B. Subba Rao
- Written by: Yaddanapudi Sulochana Rani
- Screenplay by: B. Subba Rao
- Based on: Jeevana Tarangalu (Telugu)
- Produced by: D. Rama Naidu
- Starring: Sridhar; Malashri; Sunil; Srinath
- Cinematography: V. Prathap
- Edited by: K. V. Krishna Reddy; K. Madhav Rao
- Music by: Rajan–Nagendra
- Production company: Suresh Productions
- Release date: 10 December 1991
- Running time: 137 minutes
- Country: India
- Language: Kannada

Mangalya is a 1991 Indian Kannada-language drama film, directed by B. Subba Rao and produced by D. Rama Naidu. The film is a remake of the 1973 Telugu film Jeevana Tarangalu which was based on the novel of the same name by Yaddanapudi Sulochana Rani.

The film stars Malashri, Sridhar, Sunil and Vani Viswanath. The film's music was composed by Rajan–Nagendra and the audio was launched on the Lahari Music banner.

== Cast ==
- Malashri
- Sridhar
- Srinath
- Sunil
- Vani Viswanath
- Vajramuni
- Abhijith
- Vaishali Kasaravalli
- Shivaram
- Hema Chowdhary in guest appearance
- D. Rama Naidu in guest appearance
- Bangalore Nagesh
- Mandeep Roy
- Keerthiraj
- Gayatri Prabhakar

== Soundtrack ==
The music of the film was composed by Rajan–Nagendra, with lyrics by Chi. Udaya Shankar.

Track listing
No.	Title	Lyrics	Singer(s)	Length
1.	"Mutthinantha Maathanu"	Chi. Udaya Shankar	S. P. Balasubrahmanyam, K. S. Chithra
2.	"Ninagu Naanu"	Chi. Udaya Shankar	Manjula Gururaj
3.	"Novindale Bande"	Chi. Udaya Shankar	S. P. Balasubrahmanyam
4.	"Nannase Enendu Kelabedi"	Chi. Udaya Shankar	K. S. Chithra
5.	"Sarvamangalege Shivanu Kattida"	Chi. Udaya Shankar	K. S. Chithra, Manjula Gururaj
