= Pandavaru =

- VCD cover
- Directed by: K. V. Raju
- Written by: K. V. Raju
- Produced by: Ramkumar
- Starring: Ambareesh; Devaraj; Jaggesh; Ramkumar; Abhijith
- Cinematography: Dasari Seenu
- Edited by: Basavaraj Urs
- Music by: Hamsalekha
- Production company: Surya Film Arts
- Release date: November 10, 2006
- Country: India
- Language: Kannada

Pandavaru is a 2006 Indian Kannada-language film directed by K. V. Raju. The film is a remake of Malayalam film Godfather (1991). The film is about five brothers played by Ambareesh, Devaraj, Jaggesh, Ramkumar and Abhijith. The film was released on 10 November 2006 alongside Hubballi.

== Cast ==
- Ambareesh as Kempegowda
- Devaraj as Devanna
- Jaggesh
- Ramkumar
- Abhijith
- Gurleen Chopra
- Bhavya
- Shashi Kumar
- Tara
- Nagasekhar
- Aishwarya
- Satyaprakash
- Ramesh Bhat
- Sathyajith
- Kazan Khan

== Production ==
After failing to establish himself as a successful actor, Ramkumar ventured into production with this film.

== Soundtrack ==
The music was composed by Hamsalekha.

Track listing
No.	Title	Singer(s)	Length
1.	"Thaiyya Thaiyya"	Chaitra H. G., Harish Raghavendra	4:10
2.	"Khaara Khaara"	Sonu Kakkar	4:32
3.	"Kaayutaliruva Kannige"	Kunal Ganjawala, Sadhana Sargam	5:05
4.	"Jataapati"	S. P. Balasubrahmanyam, Hemanth	5:00
5.	"Huttidare Gandasaagi"	Chetan Sosca, Harsha, Hemanth, Ramesh Ch	5:25
Total length:			24:12

== Reception ==
R. G. Vijayasarathy of IANS wrote that "Pandavaru is an enjoyable film, but the fact that it is a remake with less of sensitivity and more of crudity may be a negative factor". A critic from Rediff.com wrote that "Pandavaru is a good one time watch as it essentially entertains without allowing the viewers to think. It is faithful to the original, and the artists have done well".
