= Jeevana Tarangalu =

- Theatrical poster
- Directed by: T. Rama Rao
- Screenplay by: Acharya Aatreya
- Story by: Yaddanapudi Sulochana Rani
- Produced by: D. Rama Naidu
- Starring: Sobhan Babu; Krishnamraju; Vanisree; Chandramohan; Lakshmi
- Cinematography: S. Venkataratnam
- Music by: J. V. Raghavulu
- Production company: Suresh Productions
- Release date: 20 April 1973
- Country: India
- Language: Telugu

Jeevana Tarangalu (transl. The Waves of Life) is a 1973 Indian Telugu-language drama film directed by T. Rama Rao. The film stars Sobhan Babu, Krishnam Raju, Vanisri, Chandramohan, and Lakshmi. It is based on a novel by Yaddanapudi Sulochana Rani, and won three Filmfare Awards South. It was remade in Tamil as Thirumangalyam (1974), in Hindi as Dil Aur Deewaar (1978), and in Kannada as Mangalya (1991).

== Plot ==
Venu Gopala Rao and Savitri are a couple with two children, Roja and Chandu. But unfortunately, Venu Gopala Rao has an affair with another woman and leaves his family and children to marry her. He has two children from the second wife, namely Lavanya and a polio-affected younger daughter. Savitri faces a lot of insults from her brother and sister-in-law and lives with them because she has no shelter. Roja teaches music and Chandu is a spoiled brat who joins a theft group with an alias name, James. Meanwhile, Venu Gopala Rao's sister is a rich woman and her stepson Vijay is a lawyer by profession and a responsible citizen at heart. Her own son Ananth is a laid-back person. Though he is good-natured, but irresponsible. Venu Gopala Rao's sister bestows Ananth's responsibility on Vijay and also gives him her property.

As a result, Vijay looks after Ananth with utmost care and affection. Ananth meets Roja in a party once and the latter treats him more like a brother. But Ananth mistakes her affections to be something else. Meanwhile, Vijay decides for Ananth to marry Venu Gopala Rao's daughter Lavanya. This marriage isn't liked by either Ananth or Lavanya. Lavanya is an ultra-modern woman who is into clubs and promiscuity. She doesn't bother her father also in this regard. Ananth requests Roja to help her to come out of this marriage plan because his brother insists for the same. Roja helps Ananth out of friendship and writes a fake letter without any name mentioned. But because of this, she gets into deep trouble. Ananth mistakes Roja's help as love and plans to marry her in secret. Vijay who always objected the friendship between Ananth and Roja marries an unconscious Roja in dramatic circumstances. Roja's life gets miserable and incidentally she joins as a nanny in Venu Gopala Rao's house unaware that they are daughter-father respectively. She faces trouble seeing Vijay who often comes to their house. The rest of the film deals with how Vijay helps Roja out of four different problems – Forcible marriage, her brother Chandu who is into robberies, Lavanya who hates her, and her bedridden mother.

== Cast ==
- Sobhan Babu... Vijay
- Krishnamraju... Chandram
- Vanisree... Roja
- Chandramohan... Ananth
- Anjali Devi
- Lakshmi... Lavanya
- Gummadi... Venugopal Rao
- Padmanabham as Anji
- Ramana Reddy
- Suryakantham
- Sriranjani
- Santha Kumari
- Raavi Kondala Rao
- Rajanala as Pundarikakshaiah
- Nalla Ramamurthy as Astrologer

== Production ==
Jeevana Tarangalu is based on a novel of same name which also became equally popular when it was broadcast as a serial in All India Radio. The makers made changes from the novel like the inclusion of song "Ee Jeevana Tarangalo". During the preview show, industry people were not impressed with those changes and it was edited out during the first two days of theatrical release. However other technicians convinced Ramanaidu to include this song and the scene and it was eventually included.

== Soundtrack ==
The soundtrack was composed by J. V. Raghavulu.

- "Ee Andaniki Bandham Vesanokanaadu" (Singers: Ghantasala and P. Susheela)
- "Ee Jeevana Tarangalalo Aa Devuni Chadarangamlo" (Singer: Ghantasala)
- "Nandamaya Guruda Nandamaya" (Lyrics: C. Narayana Reddy; Singer: L. R. Eswari)
- "Puttina Roju Panduge Andariki" (Lyrics: C. Narayana Reddy; Singer: P. Susheela)
- "Thenchukuntala Unchukuntava" (Singers: P. Susheela and L. R. Eswari)
- "Uduta Uduta Huth Ekkadikelatavuch" (Singers: Ghantasala and Ramola)

== Box office ==
- The film ran more than 100 days in 12 centers in Andhra Pradesh.

== Awards ==
- Filmfare Best Film Award (Telugu) – D.Rama Naidu
- Filmfare Best Director Award (Telugu) – T. Rama Rao
- Filmfare Best Actress Award (Telugu) – Vanisri
