= Ibbani Karagithu =

- VCD cover
- Directed by: K. V. Jayaram
- Written by: Saisuthe
- Based on: Ibbani Karagithu by Saisuthe
- Produced by: Mohan
- Starring: Anant Nag; Lakshmi
- Cinematography: Chittibabu
- Edited by: M. Umanath
- Music by: Rajan–Nagendra
- Production company: Varalakshmi Movies
- Release date: 1983
- Running time: 153 minutes
- Country: India
- Language: Kannada

Ibbani Karagithu ( transl. The Dew Melted) is a 1983 Indian Kannada-language drama film directed by K. V. Jayaram and produced by Mohan. It is based on the novel of the same name by Saisuthe. The film stars Ananth Nag and Lakshmi.

== Cast ==
- Anant Nag as Varun
- Lakshmi as Manasa
- Lokesh as Raghu
- Deepa as Shwetha (Guest Appearance)
- K. S. Ashwath
- Uma Shivakumar
- T. N. Balakrishna as Rangappa
- Sundar Krishna Urs as Samarth
- Musuri Krishnamurthy as Musuri Krishnamurthy
- Mysore Lokesh
- M. S. Umesh
- Jaggesh as Rajni
- Anuradha as Anitha

== Soundtrack ==
The music of the film was composed by Rajan–Nagendra with lyrics by Chi. Udaya Shankar. The songs "Cheluve Oh Cheluve" and "Thanu ninnadu ee mana ninnadu" were extremely popular.

Track listing
No.	Title	Singer(s)	Length
1.	"Thangiye Kelamma"	S. P. Balasubrahmanyam
2.	"Cheluve Oh Cheluve"	S. P. Balasubrahmanyam, S. Janaki
3.	"Habba Habba"	S. P. Sailaja
4.	"Nanna Kannali Ninna Bimbave"	S. Janaki
5.	"Thanu ninnadu ee mana ninnadu"	S. Janaki
