= Rathnakar (actor) =

Indian actor

- Born: Kollur Manjunatha Rathnakar; 11 April 1931; Kollur, Madras Presidency, British India
- Died: 21 September 2010 (aged 79); Mysore, Karnataka, India
- Occupations: Actor; director
- Years active: 1955–2010
- Spouse: Mookambike (died 1992)
- Children: 3

Kollur Manjunatha Bhatta Rathnakar (11 April 1931 – 21 September 2010) was an Indian actor and director, known for his work in Kannada film industry. He is best known for his comic roles in movies including Kanyarathna (1963), Satya Harishchandra (1965), Guru Shishyaru (1981), Hosa Belaku (1982) and Halli Meshtru (1992). He turned director with the 1968 movie Bhagya Devathe starring Dr. Rajkumar.

== Personal life ==
Rathnakar was born in Kollur in a family of priests. His father Manjunatha Bhatta was one of the priests at Mookambika Temple, Kollur. Being the only child in the family, Rathnakar refused the job of priest and came to Mysore.

== Career ==
=== Early days & theatre life ===
Rathnakar left home at the age of 12 and came to Mysore. He worked in a Choultry on Seethavilasa road and used to sing near temples in Mysore. Sorat Ashwath and Dikki Madhava Rao who heard his singing, introduced him to theatre personality H.L.N. Simha. Rathnakar became a permanent member of Simha's troupe and went on to act plays with Rajkumar and Pandari Bai.

=== Entry to films ===
Rathnakar made his debut in the 1955 movie Vichitra Prapancha. Apart from comic roles, he also worked as assistant director in many movies and later co-directed Dr. Rajkumar in the 1968 movie Bhagya Devathe along with cinematographer R.Madhusudhan. He is famous for his squeaky trembling trademark voice. In his five decade career, Rathnakar has played variety of roles as teacher, singer, priest, palm reader, vendor in more than 300 films. His last movie was Vishnuvardhan's Aptharakshaka in 2010.

== Death ==
Rathnakar died on 21 September 2010 in Mysore, due to respiratory problems and other age related ailments. Survived by his 3 sons, Rathnakar donated his eyes to JSS hospital eye bank.

== Awards ==
- 2005 - Karnataka Rajyotsava Award by Government of Karnataka
- Aryabhata Award

== Selected filmography ==
As actor

- Vichitra Prapancha (1955)
- Dharma Vijaya (1959)
- Dashavatara (1960)
- Veera Kesari (1963)
- Satya Harishchandra
- Katari Veera (1966)
- Katha Sangama (1976)
- Guru Shishyaru (1981)
- Nyaya Ellide (1982)
- Ananda Bhairavi (1983)
- Onde Goodina Hakkigalu (1987)...Subba Rao
- Hosa Jeevana (1990)
- Prathap (1990)...priest
- Ganeshana Maduve (1990)
- Gauri Ganesha (1991)...Rathnakara
- Lankesha (2001)
- Ondagona Baa (2003)
- Aptharakshaka (2010)

As director

- Bhagya Devathe (1968)
- Bandhavya (1972)
- Shani Prabhava (1977)
