= Yamalokadalli Veerappan =

- VCD cover
- Directed by: H C Prakash
- Produced by: K. Manju
- Starring: Dheerendra Gopal; Sarigama Viji; Satya Prakash; Akhila
- Cinematography: Manohar C
- Edited by: Basavaraj Urs
- Music by: Sadhu Kokila
- Production company: Bindushree Films
- Release date: 3 December 1998
- Country: India
- Language: Kannada

Yamalokadalli Veerappan (transl. Veerappan in Yamaloka) is a 1998 Indian Kannada-language mythological action drama film directed by H C Prakash. The film's story is partly inspired by Veerappan's life and stars Dheerendra Gopal, Sarigama Viji, Satya Prakash and Akhila.

== Cast ==
- Dheerendra Gopal as Yama
- Sarigama Viji as Chitragupta
- Satya Prakash as Veerappan
- Akhila as an apsara
- Sadhu Kokila
- Michael Madhu
- Vaijanath Biradar
- Mandeep Roy
- Bank Janardhan
- G R Bheema Rao
- Sathyajith
- K. Manju
- MS Narasimhamurthy

== Production ==
The filming and post-production was completed in November 1998.

== Soundtrack ==
Yamalokadalli Veerappan

Soundtrack album by Sadhu Kokila
- Released: 22 October 2000
- Genre: Feature film soundtrack
- Length: 19:50
- Label: Mars FIlms

Sadhu Kokila composed the film's background score and the soundtrack. The soundtrack album consists of four tracks.

Track listing
| No. | Title | Singer(s) | Length |
|---|---|---|---|
| 1. | "Love Me Or Hate Me" | Sadhu Kokila, Mangala | 5:15 |
| 2. | "Touch Maado" | Sadhu Kokila, Mangala | 4:30 |
| 3. | "Baa Rasugulla" | Sadhu Kokila, Sowmya, Mangala | 5:09 |
| 4. | "Bittaaku Ee Kaadu Chinte" | Rajesh Krishnan, Mangala | 4:56 |
| Total length: | | | 19:50 |

== Reception ==
Srikanth Srinivasa of Deccan Herald wrote that "This film would definitely put critics in a spot, and leave them wondering whether to laugh or cry over the quality of such Kannada films churned out by Gandhinagar. After the success of Hallo Yama, our film-makers seem to have reached Yamaloka, going by the quality of films they are churning out".
