= S. P. Bhargavi =

- Directed by: V. Somashekhar
- Written by: V. Somashekhar
- Screenplay by: V. Somashekhar
- Produced by: S. Raghavendra
- Starring: Devaraj; Malashri; Srinath; Doddanna
- Cinematography: H. G. Raju
- Edited by: Victor Yadav
- Music by: Hamsalekha
- Production company: Raghavendra Bioscope
- Release date: 26 June 1991
- Running time: 154 minutes
- Country: India
- Language: Kannada

S. P. Bhargavi is a 1991 Indian Kannada-language action film, written and directed by V. Somashekhar. The film stars Malashri in the title role, along with Devaraj.

The film's music was composed by Hamsalekha and the audio was launched under the Lahari Music banner. It is the first movie of Devaraj as the leading hero Before he appeared in negative and supporting roles. S. P Bhargavi gave him a big breakthrough as the leading Hero.

== Cast ==
- Malashri as Bhargavi
- Devaraj as C.I.D Shankar
- Srinath
- Doddanna as Hebbet Yellappa
- Balakrishna
- Thoogudeepa Srinivas
- Maanu
- Sudheer as Macheshwara
- Disco Shanti
- Dheerendra Gopal
- C. R. Simha
- Mynavathi
- Keerthiraj
- Shimoga Venkatesh

== Soundtrack ==
The music of the film was composed and the lyrics were written by Hamsalekha.

Track listing
No.	Title	Lyrics	Singer(s)	Length
1.	"Kelayya Police Maava"	Hamsalekha	Manjula Gururaj
2.	"Deshada Kathe"	Hamsalekha	S. P. Balasubrahmanyam
3.	"Maamarake Ee Kogileya"	Hamsalekha	L. N. Shastry, Chandrika Gururaj
4.	"Kallaro Naavellaru"	Hamsalekha	S. P. Balasubrahmanyam, Chorus
5.	"Bengaloor Chali Chali"	Hamsalekha	Hamsalekha, Manjula Gururaj
