= Bhagya Devathe =

- VCD cover
- Directed by: Rathnakar-Madhu
- Screenplay by: Sorat Ashwath
- Based on: Based on Kadu Siddammana Kathe
- Produced by: V Sundareshan
- Starring: Rajkumar; K. S. Ashwath; Narasimharaju; Balakrishna
- Cinematography: R Madhu
- Edited by: P S Murthy
- Music by: Gnanamani
- Production company: Manoranjan Films
- Distributed by: Manoranjan Films
- Release date: 16 April 1968
- Running time: 117 min
- Country: India
- Language: Kannada

Bhagya Devathe is a 1968 Indian Kannada-language film, directed by Rathnakar-Madhu. Actor Rathnakar debuted as director with this movie. and produced by V Sundareshan. The film stars Rajkumar, K. S. Ashwath, Narasimharaju and Balakrishna. The film had musical score by Gnanamani. The movie is based on the folklore Kaadu Siddammana Kathe.

== Cast ==
- Rajkumar
- K. S. Ashwath as Madhu Shetty
- Narasimharaju as Mridanga
- Balakrishna
- M. P. Shankar
- Leelavathi as Siddhi, Madhu Shetty's daughter
- B. V. Radha
- Udaya Chandrika
- Ramadevi
- M. N. Lakshmi Devi as Sangeetha
- Advani Lakshmi Devi
- Shanthamma
- Prashanth (credited as Baby Prashanth)
- Vishalakshi (credited as Baby Vishalakshi)
- H. R. Shastry
- Anantharam Maccheri
- Krishna Shastry
- Hanumantha Rao
- Shyam
- Nagaraj
- N. A. Subbanna
- Comedian Guggu
- Jyothi
