= Abhijith (actor) =

Indian film actor and director

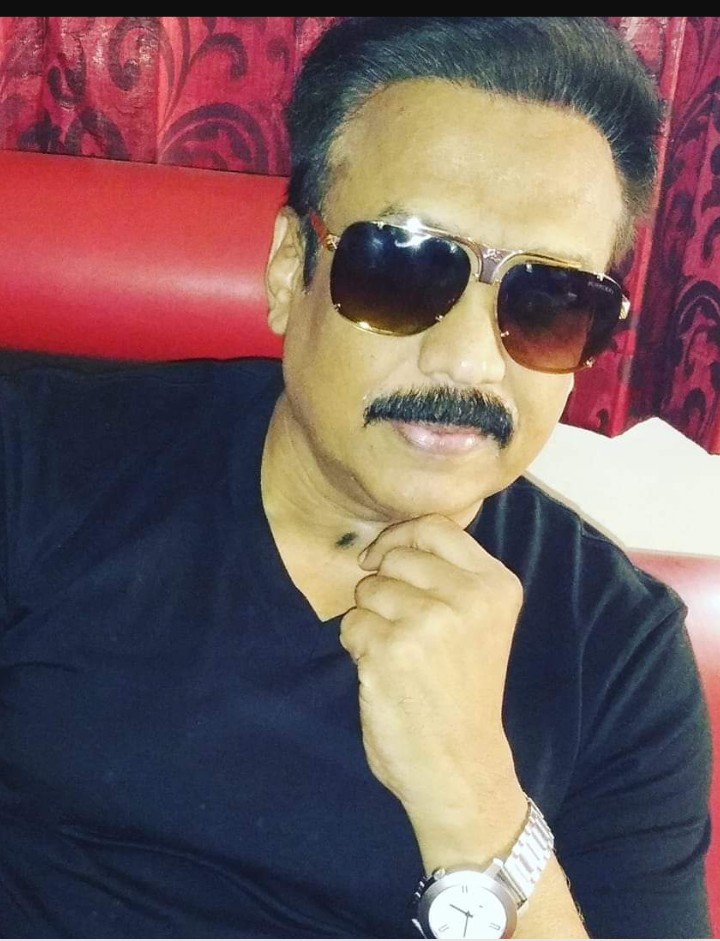
- Born: Ramaswamy; 30 July 1963 (age 63); Chitradurga, Mysore State, India
- Occupations: Actor; director; producer; singer
- Years active: 1983–present

Abhijith (born 30 July 1963) is an Indian actor, singer, producer and director working in Kannada films. Starting his career as an actor in the late 1980s, he went on to act in many films through the 1990s and 2000s. He mainly played lead roles and villains in the 1990s and some supporting roles as well.

== Career ==
Abhijith started his career in the late 1980s playing small roles. It was the 1990 release, College Hero, that established him as a successful villain of the Kannada film industry. He acted with Shruti in several successful romantic films together during the 1990s. He acted in roles with negative shades even after being a successful hero, in films such as Muddina Maava, One Man Army, and Vairi. He co-starred with Vishnuvardhan in many movies, including Kotigobba, Yajamana, and Raja Narasimha and was a close friend of him. He acted with Shruthi in several successful romantic films together during the 1990s.

Abhijith is the host of the popular show Aksharamale, which aired on Udaya TV. Aksharamaale is a Kannada-language, singing talent show running for more than 15 years on Udaya TV. He has been the host of the show since 1997 with co-host and singer Sangeetha Ravishankar and Anuradha Bhat. Abhijith's first directorial venture, Jodi No. 1, was a suspense and action movie, and the second one was Vishnu which had led to controversy with the title. He has produced films under the banner Shree Balaji Creations. Abhijith has acted in more than 150 films in the Kannada film industry.

== Filmography ==
=== As director and producer ===
Year	Film	Director	Producer	Notes
2005	Samarasimha Nayka		Yes	
2009	Jodi No.1	Yes	Yes	
2012	Vishnu	Yes	Yes	
2017	Panta		Executive	

=== As an actor ===
Year	Title	Role	Notes
1990	College Hero		
1991	Mangalya		
1992	Chaitrada Premanjali	Mahesh	
1992	Sindhoora Thilaka		
1992	Mana Mecchida Sose	Balu	
1992	Alli Ramachari Illi Brahmachari		
1992	Gruhalakshmi		
1992	Jeevana Chaitra	Prakash	
1992	Nanna Tangi		
1992	Saptapadi	Manohar	
1993	Server Somanna	Sridhar	
1994	Rupayi Raja		
1994	Bhootayiya Makkalu		
1994	Ranjitha		
1994	Bhuvaneshwari		
1994	Chinna Nee Nagutiru		
1994	Rashmi		
1994	Muddina Maava		
1994	Hettavala Koogu		
1995	Thumbida Mane		
1995	Mangalya Sakshi		
1995	Mr.Abhishek		
1996	Hettavaru		
1997	Kandalli Gundu		
1997	Lakshmi Mahalakshmi		
1999	Baduku Jatakabandi		
1999	Om Namah Shivaya		
2000	Underworld		
2000	Yajamana	Shanmukha	
2000	Gandada Gombe		
2001	Amma Nagamma		
2001	Kotigobba	Shiva	
2001	Sri Manjunatha		
2002	Antharaya		
2002	Simhadriya Simha	Vishwa	
2003	Raja Narasimha		
2004	Aparadhi		
2004	Mafia		
2004	Super Police		
2005	Jedara Bale		
2005	Samarasimha Nayaka		
2006	Pandavaru		
2007	Snehana Preetheena		
2012	Vishnu		Dual role
2013	Amareshwara Mahatme	Aadayya	
2014	Abhimanyu		Cameo
2016	CBI Sathya		
2016	Shivayogi Sri Puttayyajja		
2023	Ghost		
2025	Rajadrohi		

=== Television ===
Year	Title	Role	Ref.
1999–2015	Aksharamaale	Host and singer	
2020–2024	Sathya	Lakshman	
2026	Raakshasa	Rudrappa	
2026 - Present	Karna	Ramesh Vasishta	

== Discography ==
=== Playback singer ===
Year	Film	Song	Music director	Notes
2005	Samarasimha Nayaka	Sandoora Jatreyalli	M.N Krupakar	
2012	Vishnu	Chello Chello	M.N Krupakar	
2013	Amareshwara Mahatme	Iniya Oh Iniya		

== Awards ==
- 1996 – Bharath Udyog Samastha Award for Best Actor of the Year
- 2010 – Abhinava Chathura

== Sources ==
- Vishnuvardhan & Abhijith
- Abhijith's Vishnu Title Rejected
- Abhijith Injured to head in VISHNU movie climax
- 2
- ಅಭಿಜಿತ್ ಓರ್ವ ಪ್ರತಿಭಾವಂತ ನಟ
- 3
- Abhijith Turns Director
- Abhijith's Youtube Channel
- Aksharamaale Programme
