= Mr. Bakra =

- VCD cover
- Directed by: Vasanth
- Produced by: B. G. Babu Reddy
- Starring: Jaggesh; Rohini
- Cinematography: Janardhan Babu
- Edited by: Rajashekhar Reddy
- Music by: V. Manohar
- Production company: Kalalaya Chithra
- Release date: 20 May 2005
- Country: India
- Language: Kannada

Mr. Bakra is a 2005 Indian Kannada-language comedy film directed by Vasanth starring Jaggesh and Rohini. This is Jaggesh's 101st film and released to mixed reviews.

== Plot ==
Gopal, son of coconut merchant Bettappa is trapped by Shankar who loots him in the guise of making him a movie hero. Gopal vows to go back to his village only after recovering his amount.

== Cast ==
- Jaggesh as Gopal
- Rohini
- Mukhyamantri Chandru as Shankar
- Srinivasa Murthy as Gowda Bettappa
- Bank Janardhan
- Honnavalli Krishna
- M. N. Lakshmi Devi
- Vaijanath Biradar as Beggar
- Padmini Nanda as Shankar's wife
- Komal Kumar as Director (guest appearance)

== Production ==
This film marks the return of Jaggesh to films after being involved in politics. Sujibala made her Kannada debut with the stage name of Rohini.

== Soundtrack ==
The soundtrack of the film was composed by V. Manohar.

Track listing
No.	Title	Lyrics	Singer(s)	Length
1.	"Metgontho Nange"	V. Manohar	Jaggesh, Sangeetha Madhuri	5:19
2.	"Hannu Maagidare"	V. Manohar	Rajesh Krishnan, Nanditha	4:15
3.	"Rajani Rathi Rajani"	V. Manohar	Rajesh Krishnan, Nanditha	4:38
4.	"Bhamini Rukmini"	Bhangiranga	Jaggesh	5:21
Total length:				19:33

== Reception ==
A critic from Vijaya Karnataka wrote that "The only plus point of the film is Jaggesh. Once again he has proved that his body language and timing are still good. Whether in the guise of Krishna, or in the context of wearing a lot of gold, his performance should be enjoyed". A critic from Chitraloka.com wrote that "Debutant director Vasanth is good in bits and pieces. The comedy scenes he has carved to suit the image of 101 films young Jaggesh is hilarious. Jaggesh still has the fine timing and comedy sense".
