= Server Somanna =

- Directed by: K. Vasu
- Written by: K. Nanjunda (dialogues)
- Screenplay by: K. Balachander
- Produced by: Hari Prasad; A J V Prasad
- Starring: Jaggesh; Rambha; Abhijeeth
- Cinematography: S. Manohar
- Edited by: Suresh Urs
- Music by: Raj–Koti
- Production company: Dynamic Film Makers
- Release date: 8 January 1993
- Running time: 119 minutes
- Country: India
- Language: Kannada

Server Somanna is a 1993 Indian Kannada-language comedy film directed by K. Vasu. The film is an official remake of the 1964 Tamil film Server Sundaram. This film stars Jaggesh and Abhijeeth along with actress Rambha making her debut in Kannada. The film was a blockbuster at the box office.

== Cast ==
- Jaggesh as Somanna
- Rambha as Sudha
- Abhijeeth as Sridhar
- Pandari Bai
- Sihi Kahi Chandru
- Shivaram
- M. S. Umesh
- Arasikere Raju
- Killer Venkatesh
- M. D. Kaushik as Raja
- Junior Narasimharaju as Manju
- Disco Shanthi
- Sudha Narasimharaju
- Dwarakish...guest appearance
- Tara...guest appearance
- Umashri...guest appearance
- Chi. Udaya Shankar...guest appearance

== Production ==
The film marked the Kannada debut of Telugu film director K. Vasu, who was known for introducing Chiranjeevi in Pranam Khareedu (1978).

== Soundtrack ==
| # | Title | Singer(s) |
|---|---|---|
| 1 | "Naane Server Somanna" | S. P. Balasubrahmanyam |
| 2 | "Aakasha Malethanthu" | S. P. Balasubrahmanyam, Manjula Gururaj |
| 3 | "Ho Rabba" | S. P. Balasubrahmanyam, Malgudi Subha |
| 4 | "I Like Your Innocence" | S. P. Balasubrahmanyam, Malgudi Subha |
| 5 | "Eddelu Eddelu" | S. P. Balasubrahmanyam |

== Impact ==
Jaggesh's wife Parimala calls this film her favorite film of his because Somanna's struggles mimicked his real life struggles but called Kalidasa Kannada Meshtru (2019) a close second. Meghana Gaonkar, who would go on to pair opposite Jaggesh in Kalidasa Kannada Meshtru, said that she liked the film as a child and had a crush on his character.
