= Server Sundaram =

1964 film by Krishnan–Panju

- Theatrical release poster
- Directed by: Krishnan–Panju
- Written by: K. Balachander
- Based on: Server Sundaram by K. Balachander
- Produced by: A. V. Meiyappan
- Starring: Nagesh; Muthuraman; K. R. Vijaya
- Cinematography: S. Maruti Rao
- Edited by: S. Panjabi; R. Vittal
- Music by: Viswanathan–Ramamoorthy
- Production company: Guhan Films
- Release date: 11 December 1964
- Running time: 165 minutes
- Country: India
- Language: Tamil

Server Sundaram is a 1964 Indian Tamil-language comedy drama film directed by Krishnan–Panju and produced by A. V. Meiyappan. The film stars Nagesh as the title character. Muthuraman and K. R. Vijaya play the other lead roles while Major Sundarrajan, S. N. Lakshmi and Manorama play supporting roles. It focuses on a hotel waiter who strives to reach greater heights after he becomes an actor to attain the love of his restaurateur's daughter.

The film was adapted from a 1963 play of the same name written by K. Balachander, with the play also featuring Nagesh himself in the title role along with Sundarrajan and Lakshmi who reprised their roles in the film. Balachander also wrote the screenplay for the film. Viswanathan–Ramamoorthy composed the film's soundtrack and background music, while Kannadasan, Vaali and V. Seetharaman wrote the lyrics for the soundtrack's songs.

Server Sundaram was released on 11 December 1964. It received critical acclaim, with praise directed mainly at Nagesh's performance and Balachander's screenplay. The film went on to become a commercial success, with a theatrical run of over 100 days. At the 12th National Film Awards, it won the National Film Award for Best Feature Film in Tamil under the Certificate of Merit category, and the Filmfare Award for Best Film – Tamil.

Server Sundaram earned Nagesh and Balachander their breakthrough in Tamil cinema and led to many successful collaborations between the two. It became the first Tamil film to show numerous behind-the-scenes looks at various processes involved in film-making such as the studio interiors and song recording. The film was remade into Hindi as Main Sunder Hoon (1971) and Kannada as Server Somanna (1993).

== Plot ==
Sundaram, a poor man, comes to Madras with aspirations of becoming a film actor. However, he ends up getting a job as a hotel waiter. While catering for a group of people who were going on an excursion to Mahabalipuram, he meets Radha, the daughter of his restaurateur, Chakravarthy and misinterprets her friendly nature as love and falls in love with her. In the meantime, Sundaram happens to meet his friend Raghavan, an influential businessman, in the restaurant. During their subsequent meetings, Sundaram tells Raghavan about his ambition to become an actor as well as his love for Radha, without mentioning her name. Raghavan genuinely believes that the girl reciprocates Sundaram's feelings and motivates Sundaram to express his love.

When Raghavan is about to leave his house for a marriage proposal, Sundaram comes there and describes the girl he was talking about to Raghavan. Raghavan realises that Radha, whom he intends to marry, is the same girl Sundaram is in love with. Raghavan, believing that Radha loves Sundaram, decides to help Sundaram attain his love and get a chance to act in films, which he does successfully.

Sundaram becomes a star after his debut film becomes a success and believes that his stardom and popularity will help him in attaining his love. When Radha comes to Sundaram's house to congratulate him, he introduces her to Raghavan, who had come to visit Sundaram. As Sundaram goes to prepare snacks for the two, Radha asks Raghavan why he did not show up for the marriage proposal. Raghavan states that he thought Radha loved Sundaram. Shocked, Radha tells Raghavan that she likes Sundaram for his innocence, although she does not love him. Raghavan is pleasantly surprised, but to ensure that Sundaram's film career does not suffer from discovering the truth, he asks Radha to keep it a secret.

Sundaram's mother is pleased with her son's popularity but misses his presence due to Sundaram's busy acting career. She expresses to Sundaram her desire that she should die in his arms. When Raghavan believes that Sundaram will gradually forget Radha so that he and Radha can get married, he discovers that Sundaram's love for Radha is stronger. Raghavan then informs Radha that she should marry Sundaram, as Raghavan does not want to backstab his friend. Radha instead decides to personally express her feelings to Sundaram. When Sundaram expresses his love to Radha, she tells him that she never imagined that he would assume her friendly affection towards him as love and that Raghavan is her fiancé. Sundaram, shattered on losing his love, is also happy on hearing that Raghavan would marry her and congratulates Raghavan.

While Sundaram is busy shooting for the climax scene of a film, his mother falls down the footsteps of her home and is badly wounded. Sundaram's manager tries to convey the news to Sundaram, but is blocked by the studio authorities who inform him that the director has instructed them not to allow anyone inside. After finishing his shot, Sundaram hears of the news about his mother and rushes home, only to learn that she has died. He regrets being an actor.

Later at Raghavan and Radha's marriage ceremony, Sundaram changes to his old uniform, that of a hotel waiter. When Raghavan orders Sundaram to remove the guise, Sundaram tells him that only the actor's role was a guise, and he has never felt the peace of mind he had as a waiter elsewhere.

== Cast ==
Male cast

- Nagesh as Sundaram
- Muthuraman as Raghavan
- Major Sundarrajan as Chakravarthy

Female cast

- K. R. Vijaya as Radha
- S. N. Lakshmi as Sundaram's mother
- Manorama as Kantha

S. V. Ranga Rao guest stars as a film director. Singer T. M. Soundararajan, composer M. S. Viswanathan and guitarist S. Phillips make uncredited appearances in the song "Avalukenna". Goundamani appears uncredited as a car driver.

== Production ==
=== Development ===
In 1958, K. Balachander, then a playwright, established a theatre troupe named Ragini Recreations. Comedian Nagesh asked Balachander to give him a role in his plays, and Balachander assured him that he would write one featuring Nagesh as the main character, which became Server Sundaram. The play, a comedy drama, was first staged in 1963. Balachander stated that he wrote the story of Server Sundaram for Nagesh after watching his dramatic performance in the film Naanum Oru Penn (1963). He recalled in 2009 that when he wrote Server Sundaram with Nagesh in mind, he suffered anxious moments: "I was convinced of the story, but there was a risk in promoting Nagesh, but I pulled it off".

A. V. Meiyappan, the founder of AVM Productions, desired to produce the play as a film, but before he could, the director duo Krishnan–Panju (R. Krishnan and S. Panju), after watching the play once, went on stage and announced that they would direct its film adaptation, and paid Balachander an advance. Nevertheless, the play's namesake film adaptation was produced by Guhan Films (named after the son of producer M. Saravanan), a subsidiary of AVM. Balachander was recruited as the film's screenwriter, and initially had a keen interest in directing it himself. He said the script was "tailored" for Nagesh, contrary to AVM's general practice of choosing actors for already completed scripts.

=== Casting and filming ===
Nagesh, who starred as the title character in the play, reprised his role in the film along with Major Sundarrajan and S. N. Lakshmi. Sundarrajan played the restaurateur and the female lead's father, and Lakshmi played Sundaram's mother. After watching the play, Krishnan–Panju said, "If this play is ever made into a film, then Sundarrajan must play the father's role". Meiyappan accepted the inclusion of Nagesh in the film after watching his performance in the play. Nagesh, who in turn was impressed with Lakshmi's performance in the play, asked Balachander to have Meiyappan include her in the film. K. R. Vijaya was cast as Sundaram's love interest Radha, and Muthuraman as his friend Raghavan, reprising the roles played by Shobha and Raja on stage. Vijaya was chosen after many actresses refused to pair with Nagesh. Goundamani, who later became a successful comedian in Tamil cinema, made his acting debut with this film in an uncredited, non-speaking role. Balachander, who portrayed a small part as cleaner in the play, reprised his role in the film; however his scenes were deleted to accommodate the film's length.

Server Sundaram was the first Tamil film to show numerous behind-the-scenes looks at the various processes involved in filmmaking such as the studio interiors, song recording, horse riding scenes and rain scenes. It was also notable for not featuring an antagonist. In one sequence, Manorama is seen as an actress performing a scene for a film directed by S. V. Ranga Rao's character, using the concept of a film-within-a-film. Cinematography was handled by S. Maruti Rao, and Panju edited the film under the pseudonym "Panjabi", with R. Vittal as co-editor. Server Sundaram was publicised with a still of Nagesh holding many cups and saucers, but the film initially had no such scene. After Meiyappan finished watching the final cut, upon his request it was added to the film. The final length of the film was 4,535 m (14,879 ft).

== Themes ==
According to historian S. Theodore Baskaran, the film shows a "persistent theme in Tamil cinema", that of the bond between mother and son. He also compared it to City Lights (1931) because in both films, a poor man "pin[s] for the attention of the woman he fancies". Writing for The New Indian Express, Sharada Narayanan considered Server Sundaram to be a biography of Nagesh's own life, a view also shared by Hindustan Times' Gautaman Bhaskaran. Theodore Baskaran, Ashish Rajadhyaksha and Paul Willemen, and critic Baradwaj Rangan noted similarities between Nagesh and Charlie Chaplin. According to film journalist T. M. Ramachandran, the film tries to convey the message that when a man achieves popularity, the price he has to pay is rather unimaginably high and that peace and happiness are things which could be easily achieved by the humblest and poorest rather than by one in a state of material prosperity. Writing for Daily News Sri Lanka, S. Jegathiswaran noted that in Server Sundaram, Nagesh showed that "after having gained the social status one shouldn't forget one's past." TT Srinath wrote for The Hindu that the film tells viewers to "distance the problem or challenge and see it from afar, thus helping us recognise that what we are experiencing is perhaps not as daunting as we tend to believe."

== Music ==
The soundtrack was composed by Viswanathan–Ramamoorthy (a duo consisting of M. S. Viswanathan and T. K. Ramamoorthy), with lyrics written by Kannadasan, Vaali, and V. Seetharaman. According to Balachander, when Meiyappan wanted another song to be added at the last minute, Kumaran gave an English song for which Viswanathan created a tune which eventually became "Avalukkenna". Philips, an autodidact guitarist, performed the guitar portions for "Avalukkenna". The music troupe for the song consisted of Noel Grant (drums), Mangalamurthy (accordion), Nanjappa (flute), Fobes (violin), Henry Daniel and Joseph Krishna. Violinist T. Samuel Joseph, popularly known as Shyam, also took part in the recording of the song. Balan, a member of the troupe, claimed in 2015 that Viswanathan came up with the tune for "Avalukenna" in ten minutes, while Anand Venkateswaran of The Wire believes that Viswanathan set the song to tune in 15 minutes, and it took T. M. Soundararajan the rest of the day to record it. According to Gopal Krishnan, in his book, Chords & Raaga, "Avalukkenna" involved a "complicated arrangement of mambo and bossa nova." Sadan, a mimicry artiste in Viswanathan's troupe, lent his voice as a parrot for the song "Thattai Nenjam".

The soundtrack received positive reviews, with "Avalukkenna" being particularly well received. M. N. Bhaskaran of Hindu Tamil Thisai appreciated the clarinet interludes in the song. Baradwaj Rangan, writing for The Hindu, said, "Listen to the lazy drawl with which certain words taper off in 'Avalukkenna,' an antidote to the rock 'n' roll bounce in the rest of the song." Live versions of "Avalukenna" have been performed by various Indian singers including Karthik, Haricharan, Shweta Mohan and Rahul Nambiar.

Tamil tracklist
No.	Title	Lyrics	Singer(s)	Length
1.	"Avalukkenna"	Vaali	T. M. Soundararajan, L. R. Eswari	05:17
2.	"Silai Edutthan Oru"	Kannadasan	P. Susheela	05:16
3.	"Poga Poga Theriyum"	Kannadasan	P. B. Sreenivas, P. Susheela	04:27
4.	"Thatthai Nenjam"	Kannadasan	P. Susheela, Sadan	04:02
5.	"Paattondru Tharuvaar"	Kannadasan	P. Susheela, L. R. Eswari	04:46
6.	"Om Namo Sri Narayana" (musical drama)	V. Seetharaman	A. L. Raghavan, S. C. Krishnan, L. R. Eswari	11:15
Total length:				23:48

All lyrics are written by Anisetty Subbarao.

Telugu tracklist
No.	Title	Singer(s)	Length
1.	"Katika Shile"	P. Susheela, Chorus	05:17
2.	"Mohini Ilapai Velasene"	P. Susheela, L. R. Eswari	05:16
3.	"Kannedendham"	P. Susheela	04:27
4.	"Poota Pooche Hrudayam"	P. Susheela, P. B. Sreenivas	04:02
5.	"Navayuvati"	L. R. Eswari, Ghantasala	04:46
6.	"Parabrahma"	L. R. Eswari, Madhavapeddi Satyam, Pithapuram Nageswara Rao, Chorus	11:15
Total length:			23:48

== Release ==
Server Sundaram was released on 11 December 1964, delayed from October. The film became a commercial success and completed a theatrical run of 100 days. It was also dubbed in Telugu under the same title. Server Sundaram was remade in Hindi as Main Sunder Hoon (1971), and in Kannada as Server Somanna (1993).

On 18 April 2010, the film was screened at the South Indian Film Chamber Theatre for the Dignity Film Festival held in Chennai; other films also screened included Madhumati (1958), Kadhalikka Neramillai (1964), Anbe Vaa (1966) and Thillana Mohanambal (1968).

== Reception ==
The film received critical acclaim. Positive comments were directed mainly at Nagesh's performance as Sundaram and Balachander's screenplay. The Tamil magazine Ananda Vikatan, in its original review of the film dated 20 December 1964, mentioned that the highlight of the film was Nagesh's acting and the film gave the experience of conversing and enjoying with friends in a car journey without living much impact. Writing for Sport and Pastime on 9 January 1965, T. M. Ramachandran wrote that filmgoers who had persistently been watching films featuring "top stars in action, singing a duet or doing a romantic scene", would find Server Sundaram a welcome change, given that a comedian was playing the hero. He considered the story "very thin", but added, "The directors deserve to be congratulated on their ingenuity in presenting such scenes and in creating a sustaining interest in the whole film, especially to those moviegoers who have not witnessed the play." He lauded the performances of Nagesh, Vijaya, Muthuraman and Sundararajan, but criticised the music by Viswanathan–Ramamoorthy. Kalki said no one could have performed the title role better than Nagesh, but felt Vijaya was wasted.

== Accolades ==
Award	Ceremony	Category	Nominee(s)	Outcome	Ref.
National Film Awards	12th National Film Awards	Certificate of Merit	A. V. Meiyappan (producer); Krishnan–Panju (director)	Won	
Filmfare Awards South	12th Filmfare Awards South	Best Film – Tamil	A. V. Meiyappan	Won	

== Legacy ==
He would think through me, and I would act through him.

— Balachander on his collaborations with Nagesh.

Server Sundaram attained cult status in Tamil cinema, and is considered by many critics to be Nagesh's breakthrough role as an actor and Balachander's first success in Tamil cinema. Actor Kamal Haasan compared his 2015 film Uttama Villain (which also starred Balachander) to Server Sundaram, finding it to be "both emotional and humorous" like the latter. The success of Server Sundaram led to many collaborations between Nagesh and Balachander, such as Neerkumizhi (1965), Major Chandrakanth (1966), Edhir Neechal (1968) and Apoorva Raagangal (1975). Film historian Mohan Raman noted that by casting Nagesh in Server Sundaram, Balachander "made the comedian a serious actor." The film also became noted for introducing the anti-hero to Tamil cinema as well as the style of delivering short and fast-paced dialogues. In 2014, Pradeep Madhavan of Hindu Tamil Thisai called it a trendsetter in Tamil cinema for showcasing scenes involved in filmmaking. A dialogue spoken by Sundaram, "Long, long ago... so long ago, nobody can say how long ago" became popular. Balachander mentions the dialogue in Uttama Villain as a build-up to the film his character directs. Tamil Canadian journalist D. B. S. Jeyaraj stated that the film gave Nagesh "another dimension as an actor who could evoke tears from the audience through his emotional performance" and that Server Sundaram was one film in which he "provided stellar displays of his histrionic talents".

Actor Appukutty worked in several hotels and restaurants as a cleaner and server before making his debut as the lead actor with Azhagarsamiyin Kuthirai (2011) which won him the National Film Award for Best Supporting Actor; Kumar Chellappan of Daily News and Analysis compared this to the plot of Server Sundaram. Following Nagesh's death in 2009, Sify ranked Server Sundaram fourth in its list, "10 Best Films of late Nagesh", commenting, "A hotel waiter becomes a superstar and the transformation is shown brilliantly by the actor." Sri Lankan historian Sachi Sri Kantha included Server Sundaram in his list compiling "the ten landmark Tamil movies, spanning all genres, which delighted the multitude of fans immensely". The sequence where Sundaram balances several vessels in one hand, referred to by Gautaman Bhaskaran as the "dumara-tumbler" sequence, attained popularity, as did the scene where Sundaram's mother realises that he is not a hotel manager but a waiter. On the scene where Sundaram auditions in front of the film producers introduced to him by Raghavan, Baradwaj Rangan, writing for The New Indian Express, said, "Audiences that grew up with Nagesh will cotton on to the slyness of this apparently ungrateful gesture as the most identifiably Nagesh-like among everything that's transpired during these five minutes of Server Sundaram".

Director Radha Mohan expressed a desire to remake the film but decided against it: "If there is one film I want to remake, [Server Sundaram] will be the one, but I know I will not, because I believe classics should be left alone." A restaurant named "Hotel Server Sundaram" is located in the Thuraipakkam area of Chennai. Clips from Server Sundaram were screened along with clips from other films such as Iru Kodugal (1969), Arangetram (1973), Aval Oru Thodar Kathai (1974), Avargal (1977) and Azhagan (1991) at a function held in Balachander's honour at Tiruchirappalli in January 2015, a month after his death. Actor Vikram, who became popularly known by the moniker "Chiyaan" after the release of Sethu in 1999, stated in August 2016, "After Nagesh sir [in Server Sundaram] becomes something else, he still holds his server uniform close to his heart as a memento. Chiyaan is something like that to me."

== Bibliography ==
- Baskaran, S. Theodore (2013) [1996]. The Eye of The Serpent: An Introduction To Tamil Cinema. Westland. ISBN 978-93-83260-74-4.
- Goble, Alan (1999). The Complete Index to Literary Sources in Film. Walter de Gruyter. ISBN 978-3-11-095194-3.
- Narwekar, Sanjit (2012). Eena Meena Deeka: The Story of Hindi Film Comedy. Rupa Publications. ISBN 978-81-291-2625-2.
- Rajadhyaksha, Ashish; Willemen, Paul (1998) [1994]. Encyclopaedia of Indian Cinema. British Film Institute and Oxford University Press. ISBN 0-19-563579-5.
- Rajinikanth 12.12.12: A Birthday Special. Kasturi & Sons Ltd. 2012. GGKEY:A78L0XB1B0X.
- Saravanan, M. (2013) [2005]. AVM 60 Cinema (in Tamil) (3rd ed.). Rajarajan Pathippagam. OCLC 1158347612.
