= Nannaseya Hoove =

1999 film by E Channagangappa

- Official poster
- Directed by: E. Channagangappa
- Written by: E. Channagangappa; Dialogues: J M Prahlad; Rudresh Nagasandra
- Produced by: D. Krishna Kumar
- Starring: Jaggesh; Monica Bedi
- Cinematography: J. G. Krishna
- Edited by: Shyam
- Music by: Hamsalekha
- Production company: Venkateshwara Chitralaya
- Release date: 28 June 1999
- Country: India
- Language: Kannada

Nannaseya Hoove is a 1999 Indian Kannada-language comedy drama film directed by E. Channagangappa and starring Jaggesh and Monica Bedi.

== Cast ==
- Jaggesh
- Monica Bedi
- Jayanthi
- C. R. Simha
- Doddanna
- Ashalatha
- Tennis Krishna
- Lohithaswa
- Avinash
- M. S. Umesh

== Production ==
Jaggesh, Monica Bedi, Hamsalekha, and dialogue writer J. M. Prahlad had previously worked in Drona (1999), which was produced by cinematographer J. G. Krishna. Krishna was Jaggesh's classmate. This was E. Channagangappa's second film after Karimaleya Kaggatthalu (1993).

== Soundtrack ==
The music was composed and written by Hamsalekha and released under the Anand Audio label. The song "Hombale Hombale" by Rajesh Krishnan became popular.

Track listing
No.	Title	Singer(s)	Length
1.	"Hombale Hombale"	Rajesh Krishnan	4:54
2.	"Nesara"	Rajesh Krishnan, K. S. Chithra	5:14
3.	"Jaakai Jaapatre"	Rajesh Krishnan, K. S. Chithra	4:45
4.	"Enagyothmma"	Rajesh Krishnan, K. S. Chithra	5:08
5.	"Hennu Chanda Hennu Chanda"	Rajesh Krishnan, K. S. Chithra, Latha Hamsalekha	4:39
6.	"Lachmi Lachmi"	Rajesh Krishnan, K. S. Chithra	4:55
Total length:			29:45

== Accolades ==
1999–2000 Karnataka State Film Awards

- Best Cinematographer - J. G. Krishna
