= Dil Aur Deewaar =

- Theatrical release poster
- Directed by: K. Bapaiah
- Written by: Chanrandas Shokh (dialogues)
- Screenplay by: Chanrandas Shokh; Tarun Ghosh
- Story by: Yaddanapudi Sulochana Rani
- Based on: Jeevana Tarangalu (1973)
- Produced by: D. Ramanaidu
- Starring: Jeetendra; Moushumi Chatterjee
- Cinematography: P. N. Sundaram
- Edited by: K. A. Marthand
- Music by: Laxmikant–Pyarelal
- Production companies: Vijaya & Suresh Productions Combines
- Release date: 5 September 1978
- Running time: 156 minutes
- Country: India
- Language: Hindi

Dil Aur Deewaar (transl. The Heart and the Wall) is a 1978 Indian Hindi-language drama film, produced by D. Ramanaidu and directed by K. Bapaiah. The film stars Jeetendra and Moushumi Chatterjee, with music composed by Laxmikant–Pyarelal. It is a remake of the Telugu film Jeevana Tarangalu (1973), also made by the same banner and director.

== Cast ==
- Ashok Kumar as Rai Sahib
- Jeetendra as Vijay
- Moushumi Chatterjee as Saroj
- Rakesh Roshan as Chandu
- Vijay Arora as Anand
- Sarika as Laxmi
- Prem Chopra as Boss
- Nirupa Roy as Saroj & Chandu's Mother
- Kamini Kaushal as Vijay's Step-mother & Anand's Mother
- Jagdish Raj as Police Inspector
- Jagdeep as Kanhaiya
- Pinchoo Kapoor as Judge Raghunath
- Roopesh Kumar as Blackmailer
- Madhu Malini as Blackmailer's partner
- Komilla Wirk as Kitty
- Rajan Haksar as Inspector Rajan

== Soundtrack ==
Lyrics: Anand Bakshi

Song	Singer
"Mujhse Puchhe Mere Meet"	Kishore Kumar
"Dheere Dheere, Haule Haule, Ahista Ahista"	Kishore Kumar, Lata Mangeshkar
"Yeh Dhuan Kahan Se Utha Hai"	Asha Bhosle
"Tod De Tu Is Bandhan Ko, Yeh Farz Nahin, Dastoor Nahin"	Lata Mangeshkar, Asha Bhosle
"O Shola Badan, O Jaan-E-Chaman"	Mohammed Rafi
"Logon, Yeh Kiski Arthi Chali"	Mohammed Rafi
