= Gruhalakshmi (1992 film) =

Kannada-language drama film

- Directed by: B. Subba Rao
- Screenplay by: B. Subba Rao
- Story by: E. V. V. Satyanarayana
- Produced by: A. Venkatarama Reddy
- Starring: Malashri; Sridhar
- Cinematography: V. Prathap
- Edited by: P. Sambashiva Rao
- Music by: Raj-Koti
- Production company: LVS Productions
- Release date: 6 August 1992
- Running time: 140 mins
- Country: India
- Language: Kannada

Gruhalakshmi is a 1992 Kannada-language, drama film, written and directed by B. Subba Rao and produced by A. Venkatarama Reddy under the LVS Productions banner. It stars Malashri, Sridhar in lead roles along with Lakshmi, Jayanthi, Srinath in key supporting roles. The music is composed by Raj-Koti. The film was a remake of Telugu film Seetharatnam Gari Abbayi.

== Cast ==
- Malashree
- Sridhar
- Lakshmi as Parvathi
- Jayanthi
- Srinath
- Dheerendra Gopal
- M. S. Umesh
- Abhijeeth
- Mandeep Roy
- Bangalore Nagesh
- Rathnakar
- Honnavalli Krishna
- Bank Janardhan
- Kannada Raju
- Pandari Bai
- Mamatha Guduru
- Gayathri Prabhakar
- Rekha Das
- Shanthamma
- Kunigal Vasanth
- Go Ra Bheemarao
- Srishailan
- M S Karanth
- Mysore Basavaraj
- Mery
- Rashmi
- Chandrika
- Malathi

== Soundtrack ==
Gruhalakshmi

Film score by Raj-Koti
- Released: 1992
- Genre: Soundtrack
- Length: 18:46
- Producer: Raj-Koti

Music composed by Raj-Koti. They reused "Mellage Baa" and "Kho Kho" from "Mathuga" and "Aa Paapi" from Seetharatnam Gari Abbayi.

S. No.	Song title	Lyrics	Singers	length
1	"Nanna Ganda Brahmachari"	Chi. Udayashankar	Manjula Gururaj	4:54
2	"Mellage Baa Mellage"	Chi. Udayashankar	S. P. Balasubrahmanyam, K. S. Chithra	4:44
3	"Aluvudu Yeke"	Chi. Udayashankar	S. P. Balasubrahmanyam	3:34
4	"Kho Kho Abbabba"	Chi. Udayashankar	S. P. Balasubrahmanyam, K. S. Chithra	3:55
