= Jodi No.1 (film) =

2001 Indian film by David Dhawan

- Directed by: David Dhawan
- Written by: Rumi Jaffery (dialogues)
- Screenplay by: Imtiag Patel; Yunus Sajawal
- Produced by: Dhirajlal Shah
- Starring: Sanjay Dutt; Govinda; Twinkle Khanna; Monica Bedi; Anupam Kher
- Cinematography: K. S. Prakash Rao
- Edited by: David Dhawan
- Music by: Songs: Anand Raaj Anand; Himesh Reshammiya; Score: Anjan Biswas
- Distributed by: Time Magnetics Pvt. Ltd.
- Release date: 13 April 2001
- Running time: 154 minutes
- Country: India
- Language: Hindi
- Budget: est. ₹11 crore
- Box office: est. ₹34.13 crore

Jodi No.1 (transl. Pair No.1) is an Indian 2001 Hindi-language comedy film directed by David Dhawan. Released on 13 April 2001, the film stars Sanjay Dutt, Govinda, Anupam Kher, Twinkle Khanna and Monica Bedi. Budgeted at ₹11.00 crore (US$1.2 million) the film was a commercial success, grossing ₹34.13 crore (US$3.6 million) at the box office.

== Plot ==
Veeru and Jai are good friends and also partners in crime; thus, their friendship is named Jodi No. 1. They first gain the confidence of people and later con them. But soon they have to run from Mumbai after an encounter with a local Bhai because they end up having a brawl with his younger brother, and they by accident kill him in a nightclub. While on the run, Jai and Veeru meet Vikramjeet Singh, an NRI who is on his way to work as a manager in Goa, for Rai Bahadur, a wealthy businessman who owns a beer factory.

Jai pretends to be Vikramjeet Singh, and both he and Veeru move into Rai Bahadur's house, intending to befriend and then rob him. However, they fall in love with Rai Bahadur's daughters and, in a series of hilarious scenes, save the family from Sir John. In the end, while Jai is stealing money from Rai to release Veeru from Sir John, the entire Rai clan is watching the news and finds out that Jai and Veeru are not who they claim to be, but con men. In the end, Rai then lets Jai go with the money to save Veeru, and all goes well, and they marry the daughters of Rai.

== Cast ==
- Sanjay Dutt as Jai / Vikramjeet Singh
- Govinda as Veeru /Raju Coolie
- Twinkle Khanna as Tina
- Monica Bedi as Rinki Rai Bahadur
- Anupam Kher as Rai Bahadur
- Ashish Vidyarthi as Sir John (Bhanja)
- Sayaji Shinde as Thakral (Mama)
- Supriya Karnik as Shanno Bua
- Aasif Sheikh as Vikramjeet Singh (NRI)
- Tiku Talsania as Ranjit Singh, Vikramjeet’s father.
- Sanjay Narvekar as Bedi
- Mukesh Rishi as Baburao
- Shakti Kapoor as Insp. Shakti Singh (Mumbai Police)
- Ajit Vachani as Raman Rai
- Ashok Saraf as Ashok Rai
- Anil Dhawan as Kamal Rai
- Avtar Gill as Insp. Ram (Goa Police)
- Kannu Gill as Wife of Raman
- Himani Shivpuri as Wife of Kamal
- Shivaji Satam as Crime Branch (special appearance)
- Rajat Bedi as Tiger (special appearance)
- Pooja Batra as herself in Item Song Mai Mast Kudi. (special appearance)
- Mushtaq Khan as D'Costa
- Pramod Moutho as Rajpal
- Shashi Kiran as Banker
- Arjun as Monty, Sir John's brother.
- Vashu Bhagnani as Hasina

== Music ==
Jodi No. 1

Soundtrack album by Himesh Reshammiya and Anand Raaj Anand
- Released: 26 February 2001
- Recorded: 2001
- Venue: Mumbai
- Genre: Feature film soundtrack
- Label: T-Series

The music is composed by Anand Raaj Anand and Himesh Reshammiya, the lyrics were written by Dev Kohli and Sudhakar Sharma.

#	Title	Singer(s)
1	"Tera Dil Mera Thikana"	Kumar Sanu and Sonu Nigam
2	"Teri Bindiya Udda Ke Le Gaye"	Abhijeet and Sunidhi Chauhan
3	"Meri Mehbooba"	Sonu Nigam
4	"Dil Dhak Dhak Karta Hai"	Sonu Nigam and Alka Yagnik
5	"Jodi No 1"	Kumar Sanu, Sonu Nigam and Alka Yagnik
6	"Ande Ka Fanda"	Pratik Joseph
7	"Main Mast Kudi"	Sonu Nigam and Sunidihi Chauhan
8	"Akh Lad Gaye"	Hans Raj Hans

== Reception ==
Writing for Rediff.com, Nidhi Taparia called the film "as humorous as canned laughter" and opined that both Khanna and Bedi "up the glam factor" but "might as well not have acted in the film". She felt that Ashish Vidyarthi, Sayaji Shinde, Shakti Kapoor and Anupam Kher are "wasted" in the film. Taran Adarsh wrote in his 2-star review for Bollywood Hungama, that the film "will settle to the average category" and if it belonged to anybody it was Govinda. He added that Khanna "oozes oomph" and Bedi added "glamour to the proceedings."

According to Box Office India the film had an excellent opening. Altogether it made ₹28 crore and was declared a "Above average" by Box Office India. It was also the tenth highest-grossing film of the year.

== Awards ==
- Nominated: Filmfare Award for Best Performance in a Comic Role - Govinda
- Winner: IIFA Award for Best Performance in a Comic Role - Govinda
