= M. N. Lakshmi Devi =

Indian Kannada theatre and film actress

- Born: 14 April 1934 (age 92); Chintamani (Now in Chikballapur), Karnataka, India
- Occupation: Actress
- Awards: Karnataka State Film Award for Best Supporting Actress

Mysore Narasimhachar Lakshmi Devi, known as M. N. Lakshmi Devi, is a veteran film artist in Kannada films. She is from Chintamani and her acting career spans 7 decades. She made her debut in the film Srinivasa Kalyana (1952) and has acted in nearly 1,000 films. Devi is known for the movies "Bhakta Kanakadasa" (1960), "Bangaarada Manushya"(1972), "Veera Kesari"(1963) and many more.

The famous song "Yaru yaru nee yaru.." from the movie Rathna Manjari (1962), was picturised on Lakshmi Devi and Narasimharaju. Devi has acted in many serials and still she is acting in films (Googly-2013), (Rajahuli-2013). She is the only actress in Kannada cinema to have screen presence of more than 70 years.

== Awards ==
- 2001-02 - Karnataka State Film Award for Best Supporting Actress - Kallara Kalla.
- 2006-07 - Dr. Rajkumar Lifetime Achievement Award by Karnataka Government.

== Selected filmography ==
Year	Film	Role(s)	Notes
1952	Sri Srinivasa Kalyana		
1953	Sowbhagya Lakshmi	Singari	
1955	Mahakavi Kalidasa	Kalidasa Mathe	
1955	Sodari	Geeta	
1956	Daiva Sankalpa		
1957	Rayara Sose		
1957	Rathnagiri Rahasya		
1957	Chintamani		
1958	Anna Thangi		
1960	Bhakta Kanakadasa		
1960	Aasha Sundari		
1960	Makkala Rajya		
1960	Rani Honnamma		
1961	Vijayanagarada Veeraputra		
1962	Vidhi Vilasa		
1962	Thejaswini		
1962	Swarna Gowri		
1962	RathnaManjari		
1962	Mahatma Kabir	Alaka	
1962	Gaali Gopura		
1963	Veera Kesari		
1963	Valmiki		
1963	Saaku Magalu		
1963	Nanda Deepa		
1963	Jenu Goodu		
1963	Gowri		
1965	Veera Vikrama		
1965	Pathala Mohini		
1965	Mahasati Anasuya		
1965	Bereta Jeeva		
1967	Padavidhara		
1967	Immadi Pulikeshi	Padmala's attendant	
1968	Sarvamangala		
1968	Bhagya Devathe	Sangeetha	
1969	Shiva Bhakta	Gopi	
1969	Chikkamma		
1969	Broker Bheeshmachari		
1970	Modala Rathri		
1970	Lakshmi Saraswathi	Shanthamma	
1970	Gejje Pooje	Savithri	
1971	Sharapanjara	Maithili	
1971	Kula Gourava	Meenakshi	
1971	Bhale Adrushtavo Adrushta	Sakku	
1971	Baala Bandana	Papakshi	
1971	Anugraha		
1972	Jeevana Jokali		
1972	Triveni		
1972	Nanda Gokula	Dhanalakshmi	
1972	Naagarahaavu	Mary	
1972	Naa Mechida Huduga		
1972	Bangaarada Manushya	Chaya	
1973	Devaru Kotta Thangi	Nagamma	
1973	Bangarada Kalla		
1974	Upasane	Parvathi	
1974	Maga Mommaga		
1974	Bhakta Kumbara	Tulasi	
1974	Anna Attige	Lakshmi	
1975	Thrimurthy		
1975	Mane Belaku		
1975	Devara Kannu	Sandhya's aunt	
1976	Hudugatada Hudugi		
1976	Vijaya Vani		
1976	Makkala Bhagya	Nirmala's mother	
1976	Kanasu Nanasu	Alamelu	
1977	Shubhashaya		
1977	Manassinanthe Mangalya		
1977	Sanaadi Appanna		
1977	Pavana Ganga	Seetha	
1977	Nagarahole	Teacher	
1977	Chinna Ninna Muddaduve		
1977	Bhagyavantharu	Parvathi's stepmother	
1977	Banashankari	Anasuya	
1978	Madhura Sangama	Stage actor playing Sangayi	Cameo
1978	Maathu Tappada Maga	Rachappa's wife	
1978	Kiladi Kittu		
1980	Makkala Sainya		
1981	Kula Puthra		
1982	Kalasapurada Hudugaru		
1983	Mutthaide Bhagya		
1983	Gedda Maga		
1984	Police Papanna		
1985	Thayi Thande		
1985	Shabhash Vikram		
1985	Kumkuma Thanda Sowbhagya		
1985	Balondu Uyyale		
1987	Yarigagi		
1989	Anantana Avantara	Rambe	
1990	Chapala Chennigaraya	Padmabai	
1991	Krama		
1991	Gowri Kalyana		
1993	Muddina Maava		
1994	Rayara Maga		
1994	Mutthanna		
1994	Hettha Karulu		
1994	Beda Krishna Ranginata		
1995	Yama Kinkara		
1995	Thaliya Sowbhagya		
1995	State Rowdy		
1995	Operation Antha		
1995	Kalyanothsava		
1995	Hendathi Endare Heegirabeku		
1995	Gadibidi Aliya		
1996	Boss		
1996	Annavra Makkalu		
1997	Thavarina Theru		
1997	Ranganna		
1997	O Mallige		
1997	Maduve		
1997	Honey Moon		
1997	Anna Andre Nammanna		
1998	Simhada Guri		
1998	Marthanda		
1998	Mathina Malla		
1998	Jagath Kiladi		
1998	Arjun Abhimanyu		
1999	The Killer		
1999	Sambhrama		
1999	Ravimama		
1999	Rambhe Urvashi Menake		
1999	Premachari		
1999	Patela		
1999	Durga Shakthi		
2000	Yajamana		
2000	Sulthan		
2000	Soorappa		
2000	Nan Hendthi Chennagidale	Passerby	Cameo appearance
2000	Naga Devathe		
2000	Indradhanush		
2001	Sundara Kanda		
2001	Kanoonu		
2001	Jipuna Nanna Ganda		
2001	Huchcha		
2001	Grama Devathe		
2002	Olu Saar Bari Olu		
2002	Law and Order		
2003	Annavru		
2003	Partha		
2003	Ondagona Baa		
2003	Nanjundi		
2003	Thayi Illada Thabbali		
2003	Kutumba		
2003	Sacchi		
2003	Manasella Neene		
2004	Jyeshta		
2004	Kalasipalya		
2004	Rama Krishna		
2004	Kanasina Loka		
2004	Ranga (SSLC)		
2004	Abbabba Entha Huduga		
2005	Vishnu Sena		
2005	Namma Basava		
2005	Hudgeer Saar Hudgeeru		
2005	Sye		
2005	Mr. Bakra		
2005	Varsha		
2006	Neelakanta		
2006	Nage Habba		
2006	Hubli		
2006	Savira Mettilu		
2006	Thangigagi		
2006	Thandege Thakka Maga		
2006	Hatavadi		
2006	Mata		
2007	Nali Naliyutha		
2007	Thamashegagi		
2008	Gulama		
2008	Rocky		
2008	Akka Thangi		
2008	Sangaathi		
2008	Madesha		
2008	Bandhu Balaga		
2008	Chellatada Hudugaru		
2008	Jnana Jyothi Sri Siddaganga		
2008	Inthi Ninna Preethiya		
2008	Navashakthi Vaibhava		
2009	Devaru Kotta Thangi		
2009	Bhagyada Balegaara		
2009	Dubai Babu		
2009	Maccha		
2009	Savaari		
2009	Jaaji Mallige		
2009	Ee Sambhashane		
2010	Huduga Hudugi		
2010	Narada Vijaya		
2010	Olave Vismaya		
2010	Swayamvara		
2010	Dildaara		
2010	Preethiya Theru		
2010	Nan Madid Thappa		
2011	College College		
2011	Hero Nanalla		
2011	Bhadra		
2011	Dudde Doddappa		
2011	Veerabahu		
2012	Munjane		
2012	Alemari	Mohan's customer	
2013	Bhajarangi		
2013	Raja Huli		
2013	Nanda Gokula		
2013	Googly		
2013	Auto Raja		
2013	Gajendra		
2013	Veera		
2014	Jaggi		
2014	Pandya		
2014	Gandhiji Kanasu		
2015	Master Piece		
2015	Vamshodharaka		
2015	Goolihatti		
2015	Mahakali		
2015	Male Nilluvavarege		
2015	Prema Pallakki		
2016	John jani Janardhan		
2017	Tiger Galli		
2018	Tagaru		
2018	Ayogya		

== See also ==
- List of people from Karnataka
- Cinema of Karnataka
- List of Indian film actors
- Cinema of India
