= Rupayi Raja =

1993 Indian film directed by B. Mallesh

- title card
- Directed by: B. Mallesh
- Written by: Hamsalekha (dialogues)
- Screenplay by: Chi. Udaya Shankar
- Story by: B. Mallesh
- Produced by: S. A. Srinivas; S. A. Chinne Gowda
- Starring: Jaggesh; Abhijith; Shruti
- Cinematography: B. C. Gowrishankar
- Edited by: S. Manohar
- Music by: Hamsalekha
- Production company: Sri Chowdeshwari Art Combines
- Release date: 1993
- Running time: 138 minutes
- Country: India
- Language: Kannada

Rupayi Raja also spelled as Roopayi Raja (transl. King of Rupees) is a 1993 Indian Kannada drama film written and directed by B. Mallesh starring Jaggesh, Abhijith and Shruti in the lead roles.

The film produced by S. A. Chinne Gowda and S. A. Srinivas in the banner of Sri Chowdeshwari Art Combines has musical score by Hamsalekha.

== Cast ==
- Jaggesh
- Abhijith
- Shruti
- Umashree
- Aravind
- Girija Lokesh
- Lakshmi Bhat
- Venkatesh
- K. S. Ashwath
- Dheerendra Gopal
- Bank Janardhan
- Honnavalli Krishna

== Music ==
Rupayi Raja

Soundtrack album by Hamsalekha
- Released: 21 March 1993
- Genre: Feature film soundtrack
- Language: Kannada
- Label: Akash Audio

The film had its soundtrack scored and composed by Hamsalekha.

1. Onda Erada Odida — S. P. B.
2. Oh Bangarapurada — K. S. Chitra, S. P. B.
3. Hendthige — S. P. B.
4. Seere Ogedare — S. P. B.
5. Idyaking Aaduthiyappo — K. S. Chitra, S. P. B.
