= Main Sundar Hoon =

- Directed by: Krishnan–Panju
- Story by: K. Balachander
- Produced by: M. Murugan; M. Kumaran; M. Saravanan; M. Balasubramanian; M. S. Guhan
- Starring: Mehmood; Biswajeet; Leena Chandavarkar
- Music by: Shankar-Jaikishan
- Distributed by: AVM Productions
- Release date: 23 April 1971
- Running time: 147 minutes
- Country: India
- Language: Hindi

Main Sundar Hoon (transl. I am Sunder) is a 1971 Indian Hindi-language drama film directed by the duo Krishnan-Panju. The film stars Mehmood, Biswajeet, Leena Chandavarkar in lead roles. It is a remake of the 1964 Tamil film Server Sundaram.

== Plot ==
Sunder works in a hotel owned by Ram Swarup as a waiter. He is a very funny, uneducated man, with a suitably funny face, in contrast to his name. Radha is the daughter of Ram Swarup. She often comes to the hotel, and Sunder happens to meet her and amuse her with funny jokes. One day, in a casual remark, she says: "I like your innocence". He does not understand the word "innocence", and thinks that she likes him. He also likes her, but is afraid to tell her, as he works in her father's hotel.

Then, he seeks help from his friend, Amar. He helps him find work in the film industry. And in no time, Sunder emerges as a leading comic actor. But at this time, Amar, ignorant about his friend's love, and Radha fall in love. When he knows that Sunder's love is Radha, he asks Radha, who says that she never loved Sunder. Amar stops Sunder multiple times from expressing his feelings to Radha, thinking that the truth will break Sunder down.

During his stardom days, he once performs at a charity show for orphaned children. He becomes emotional seeing the children, and decides to stay a day longer, and in the process, misses his father's death ceremony at his home. His mother asks him to be with her in her last moments, and he promises to.

One day, during an interview to the All India Radio, he says that he likes to have his old waiter uniform in front of him, so that it could remind him of what he was earlier, so that he would not develop any pride. And in the same interview, he says that he is going to marry someone he loves. Amar and Radha listen to this on the radio. Knowing that Sunder will come to express his love for her, Radha urges Amar to tell him the truth, but he says, he is unable to do so. Sunder comes, and Radha tells him the truth. Heartbroken, Sunder wishes well for his friend, and Radha.

Then, one day, he goes for the shooting of the climax of a film, whose date of release has come very near. The producer says to his guard that nobody, under any circumstance should disturb them. And back home, his mother falls down the stairs. She is rushed to the hospital. She wants to see her son, so, a man is sent to call him, but the guard does not allow him in. Instead, he himself goes to get some good medication. Sunder, after finishing the work, learns about the accident, and rushes away. But he finds her dead. He regrets being a celebrity.

Amar and Radha marry. At that ceremony, Sunder comes in his old uniform, of a waiter. He says, he will no longer work in films, as that life is unreal. He will meet with his mother from now on, by helping poor and orphaned children.

== Cast ==
- Mehmood as Sundar
- Biswajeet as Amar
- Leena Chandavarkar as Radha
- Sulochana Latkar as Sundar's mother
- Aruna Irani as Miss Pasha (film actress)
- Rajendra Nath as Director
- Shabnam
- David as Ram Swaroop
- Mukri as Dattaram
- Ashim Kumar as Chandrakant Mehta (film producer)
- C. S. Dubey as Chicken owner
- Jayshree T. as Herself (in the song "Naach Meri Jaan")
- Jaikishan (in the song "Naach Meri Jaan")
- Kishore Kumar (in the song "Naach Meri Jaan")
- Anand Bakshi (in the song "Naach Meri Jaan")
- Shahu Modak as Lord Shiva in the parody song
- Sulochana Chatterjee as Devi Parvati in the parody song

Actors Waheeda Rehman, Ramesh Deo appear in cameo roles.

== Production ==
Main Sunder Hoon is a remake of the Tamil film Server Sundaram (1964).

== Songs ==
Song	Singer
"Aaj Main Jawan Ho Gayi"	Lata Mangeshkar
"Tujhe Dil Ki Baat Bata Doon"	Lata Mangeshkar
"Mujhko Thand Lag Rahi Hai, Mujhse Door Tu Na Ja"	Asha Bhosle, Kishore Kumar
"Do Mastane, Do Deewane, Ek Main Hoon Ek Tu"	Asha Bhosle, Kishore Kumar
"Naach Meri Jaan Phataphat, Baat Meri Maan Phataphat"	Asha Bhosle, Kishore Kumar
"Parivar Niyojan Drama (with Parody songs)"	Asha Bhosle, Manna Dey, Mukesh

== Trivia ==
The picnic song 'Tuze dil ki baat bata du' with Leena Chandavarkar and her friends is shot in Mahabalipuram, now a world heritage site.

In the award ceremony scene, Mehmood says the funny words "Ladies and Ledas" instead of "Ladies and gentlemen" ... this became quite popular in many informal events later.
