= Ramakrishna (2004 Kannada film) =

- Directed by: Om Sai Prakash
- Written by: B. A. Madhu (dialogues)
- Screenplay by: Om Sai Prakash
- Story by: Pandiarajan
- Based on: Aan Paavam (1985) by Pandiarajan
- Produced by: K. Bala Muttaiah
- Starring: V. Ravichandran; Jaggesh; Kaveri; Laila
- Cinematography: G. S. V. Seetharam
- Edited by: Shyam Yadav
- Music by: S. A. Rajkumar
- Production company: Sri Dhanalakshmi Creations
- Distributed by: Bahaar Films
- Release date: 28 May 2004
- Running time: 146 minutes
- Country: India
- Language: Kannada

Ramakrishna is a 2004 Indian Kannada-language romantic comedy film directed by Om Sai Prakash and produced by K. Bala Mutthaiah. The film stars V. Ravichandran, Jaggesh, Kaveri and Laila in the leading roles. The music was composed by S. A. Rajkumar. It is a remake of 1985 Tamil film Aan Paavam.

== Cast ==
- V. Ravichandran as Rama
- Jaggesh as Krishna
- Kaveri as Seetha
- Laila as Lakshmi
- Srinivasa Murthy as Vishwanath, Lakshmi's father
- Doddanna as Shankrappa, Rama and Krishna's father
- Sadhu Kokila as Rowdy Ranganna
- Om Sai Prakash as Seetha's father
- Chitra Shenoy as Seetha's Mother
- M. N. Lakshmi Devi as Rama and Krishna's grandmother and Shankrappa's mother
- Thriller Manju cameo appearance in fight scene
- Dharma
- G. K. Krishna
- Bank Suresh
- Rathnakar
- Bangalore Nagesh
- Mandeep Roy
- Anand Rao
- Master Karthik Sharma

== Production ==
The film's final schedule was held at Srirangapatna.

== Soundtrack ==
The music was composed by S. A. Rajkumar and lyrics written by K. Kalyan. A total of 6 tracks have been composed for the film and the audio rights brought by Manoranjan Audio. "Halli Haadu" and "Muguthi Muthu" were reused from Rajkumar's own songs "Komma Komma" (Nuvvu Vastavani; Telugu) and "Mookuthi Muthazhagu" (Kannupadapoguthaiya; Tamil) respectively.

All lyrics are written by K. Kalyan.

Track listing
No.	Title	Singer(s)	Length
1.	"Gili Gili Giliye"	Rajesh Krishnan, Mathangi
2.	"Gandhada Gudi"	S. P. Balasubrahmanyam, K. S. Chithra
3.	"Mugutthi Muthu Chanda"	Hariharan
4.	"Chandulli Nanna"	S. P. Balasubrahmanyam
5.	"Halli Hudugi Haadu"	K. S. Chithra
6.	"Halli Hudugi Haadu (sad)"	K. S. Chithra

== Reception ==
Viggy wrote "Looks like director was least bothered to polish the movie with contemporary touch; he followed the same equation that was used twenty years back!" Deccan Herald wrote "Saiprakash has mixed romance, action, silly comedy and sentiments and all that go into making an out and out commercial film . It is like ‘old wine in a new bottle’". Indiainfo wrote "The film is in a village backdrop. But at times the director has mixed village and city. Both the lead hero's look as if they have come from the city. Heroines are very much village belle's and things look confusing here. Editing is not so pleasing. Cinematography is okay. Music is good. Two songs are hummable. Show is worth the ticket money."
