= Gajanura Gandu =

- Theatrical release poster
- Directed by: Anand P. Raju
- Produced by: G. R. Krishna Reddy
- Starring: Shiva Rajkumar; Narmada; Jayanthi
- Cinematography: Mallikarjuna
- Edited by: R. Janardhan
- Music by: Sadhu Kokila
- Production company: Sri Lakshmi Cine Productions
- Release date: 19 January 1996
- Running time: 138 minutes
- Country: India
- Language: Kannada

Gajanura Gandu (transl. Son of Gajanur) is a 1996 Indian Kannada-language action drama film directed by Anand P. Raju and produced by G. R. Krishna Reddy. The film stars Shiva Rajkumar, Narmada and Jayanthi. The film's score and soundtrack is composed by Sadhu Kokila.

== Cast ==
- Shiva Rajkumar as Rajendra
- Narmada
- Jayanthi
- Avinash
- Sadashiva
- Tennis Krishna
- Thriller Manju
- Honnavalli Krishna
- Keerthiraj
- Ashalatha
- Michael Madhu

== Soundtrack ==
The soundtrack of the film was composed by Sadhu Kokila.

Track listing
No.	Title	Singer(s)	Length
1.	"Sindhura Bhagyava"	S. P. Balasubrahmanyam & K. S. Chithra
2.	"Collegu Teaminalli"	S. P. Balasubrahmanyam & Mangala
3.	"Henna Life Mistery"	Sadhu Kokila, K. S. Chithra
4.	"Mutthu Ratnagala"	Rajesh Krishnan, Sujatha
5.	"Yuga Yuga"	Rajkumar
