= Monica Bedi =

Indian actress and television presenter

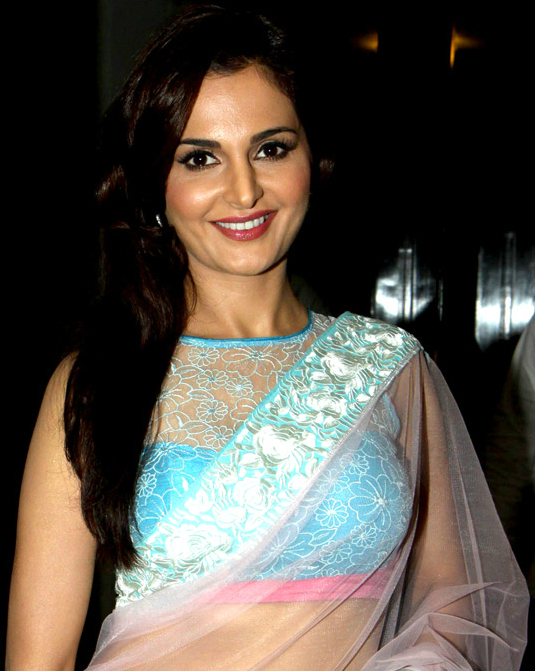
- Monica Bedi at the 8th Aap Ki Awaz Media Excellence Awards, 2013
- Born: 18 January 1970 (age 56); Chabbewal, Hoshiarpur, Punjab, India
- Education: Borresen School; University of Oxford
- Occupation: Actress
- Years active: 1994- Present
- Notable work: Surakshaa; Jodi No.1; Bigg Boss 2; Saraswatichandra

Monica Bedi (born 18 January 1970) is an Indian actress and television presenter who primarily appears in Hindi films. She has also worked in Telugu, Tamil, Kannada, and Bengali films. Bedi debuted in Hindi films in the mid-1990s, with notable works including Pyaar Ishq Aur Mohabbat and Jodi No.1. She is known for participating in reality TV shows such as Bigg Boss 2 and Jhalak Dikhhla Jaa 3, and for her role as Gumaan Kaur Vyas in Star Plus's Saraswatichandra. In 2002, Bedi was convicted for using a forged document.

== Early life ==
Bedi was born 18 January 1975 to Prem Kumar Bedi and Shakuntala Bedi in the village Chabbewal, Hoshiarpur district, Punjab. Her parents moved to Drammen, Norway, in 1979. She studied English Literature and completed her education at the University of Oxford.

== Career ==
Bedi began her acting career with the 1995 Telugu film Taj Mahal, produced by D. Ramanaidu. She was later cast by Ramanaidu in another Telugu project, Sivayya. That same year, Bedi made her Bollywood debut, starring opposite Saif Ali Khan in Surakshaa.

Throughout her career, Bedi appeared in numerous Hindi films, working alongside notable actors such as Suniel Shetty, Arjun Rampal, Chiranjeevi, Salman Khan, Sanjay Dutt, Govinda, and Dharmendra. One of her notable films was the comedy Jodi No. 1, directed by David Dhawan. She also ventured into reality television, participating in Bigg Boss season 2, Jhalak Dikhhla Jaa 3, and Desi Girl. Additionally, she contributed to a spiritual music album released by Universal Music, where she sang the chant "Ek Onkar."

In 2012, Bedi appeared in the Punjabi film Sirphire. From 2013 to 2014, she played the role of Ghuman in the Star Plus series Saraswatichandra, produced by Sanjay Leela Bhansali. In 2014, she portrayed a Punjab deputy superintendent of police in the Punjabi film Romeo Ranjha.

== Personal life ==
In September 2002, Bedi and Abu Salem, an Indian gangster were arrested and later served prison sentences in Portugal for entering the country on forged documents. In 2006, an Indian Court convicted Bedi for procuring a passport on a fictitious name. In November 2010, the Supreme Court of India upheld her conviction but reduced the prison sentence to the period that she had already served.

== Filmography ==
Year	Film	Role	Language	Notes
1994	Main Tera Aashiq		Hindi	
1994	Andaz Tera Mastana		Hindi	
1995	Taj Mahal		Telugu	
1995	Surakshaa	Kiran	Hindi	
1995	Aashique Mastane		Hindi	
1996	Khilona	Kajal	Hindi	
1996	Soggadi Pellam	Tulasi	Telugu	
1996	Subash	Anitha	Tamil	
1997	Ek Phool Teen Kante	Monica Sinha	Hindi	
1997	Jeeyo Shaan Se		Hindi	
1997	Tirchhi Topiwale	Sanam Oberoi	Hindi	
1997	Circus Sattipandu		Telugu	
1998	Jabab Dihi		Bengali	
1998	Janto Kobor		Bengali	Bangladeshi Movie
1998	Sivayya	Inspector Roja	Telugu	
1998	Choodalani Vundi		Telugu	
1999	Drona	Swetha	Kannada	
1999	Yamajathakudu		Telugu	
1999	Kalicharan		Hindi	
1999	Nannaseya Hoove	Lakshmi	Kannada	
1999	Sikander Sadak Ka		Hindi	
1999	Jaanam Samjha Karo	Monica	Hindi	
1999	Kaala Samrajya	Monica K. Singh	Hindi	
1999	Speed Dancer	Monika	Telugu	
1999	Lohpurush	Rashmi	Hindi	
2001	Jodi No.1	Rinky	Hindi	
2001	Pyaar Ishq Aur Mohabbat	Maya Dhillon	Hindi	
2003	Tada		Hindi	
2011	Devadasiyin Kathai	Swathi Varma	Tamil	
2012	Parichaya	Rekha	Nepali	
2012	Hridoye Lekho Naam		Bengali	
2012	Sirphire	Simran	Punjabi	
2014	Romeo Ranjha	Reet Kaur	Punjabi	
2017	Bandookan	Balwinder	Punjabi	

=== Television ===
Year	Title	Role
2008	Bigg Boss 2	Contestant
2009	Jhalak Dikhhla Jaa 3	Contestant
2009	Raaz Pichhle Janam Ka	Contestant
2010	Dil Jeetegi Desi Girl 1	Contestant
2013–2014	Saraswatichandra	Guman Vyas/Roopmati
2015	Bandhan	Narayani Deshpande
