= Sarigama Viji =

Indian entertainment personality (1949–2025)

- Born: Vijaykumar; 1949; Koratagere Tumkur district
- Died: 15 January 2025 (aged 76); Bengaluru, Karnataka, India
- Other name: Sarigama Vijaykumar
- Occupations: Actor; writer; television personality
- Years active: 1965–2024
- Notable work: Samsaradalli Sarigama (theatre play)

R. Vijaykumar (1949 – 15 January 2025), known by the stage name Sarigama Viji, was an Indian actor, writer and television personality known for his work in Kannada cinema. He was also a theatre artist, and was based in Karnataka.

== Background ==
Sarigama Viji was married and had a son. He died from multiple organ failure in Bengaluru, Karnataka, on 15 January 2025, at the age of 76.

== Career ==
Before pursuing his acting career, he worked in NGEF.

=== Films ===
Viji's debut as an actor came in the Kannada film Beluvalada Madilalli (1975). By 2018, he had acted in around 269 films in Kannada. On 80 films, he worked as an Assistant director.

=== Theatre works ===
Samsaradalli Sarigama, a theatre play which he directed and acted, was played more than 1390 times, in Bangalore, Hyderabad, Chennai, Delhi and Mumbai. His theatre group, Yashasvi was the creator of the play.

=== Television ===
Viji directed around 2,400 episodes of television soap operas. He was a part of many television soap operas/series including as a jury member in reality soaps, Comedy Khiladigalu Championship, which aired in Zee Kannada.

== Selected filmography ==
- Maduve Madi Nodu (1965)
- Beluvalada Madilalli (1975)
- Kappu Kola (1980) – Bheema (credited as R. Vijaykumar)
- Prathap (1990) – Suri
- Mana Mecchida Sose (1992)
- Kempaiah IPS (1993)
- Alimayya (1993)
- Gold Medal (1994) – Viji
- Jagath Kiladi (1998)
- Yamalokadalli Veerappan (1998)'
- Durgi (2004)
- Srusti (2004)
- Swartharatna (2018)

== See also ==
- List of people from Karnataka
- Cinema of Karnataka
- List of Indian film actors
