= Alli Ramachari Illi Brahmachari =

- Directed by: B. Ramamurthy
- Screenplay by: B. Ramamurthy
- Story by: Kunigal Nagabhushan
- Produced by: M. Rajendra; N. Kumar
- Starring: Jaggesh; Swathi Ganguly; Prathibha; Abhijith
- Cinematography: Manohar C.
- Edited by: S. Prasad
- Music by: V. Manohar
- Production company: Sri Lakshmi films
- Release date: 1992
- Country: India
- Language: Kannada

Alli Ramachari Illi Brahmachari (Kannada: ಅಲ್ಲಿ ರಾಮಾಚಾರಿ ಇಲ್ಲಿ ಬ್ರಹ್ಮಚಾರಿ) is a 1992 Indian Kannada film directed by B. Ramamurthy. The film stars Jaggesh in a double role along with Swathi Ganguly, Prathibha and Abhijith. The music was scored by Hamsalekha. Thriller Manju worked as the stunt director.

Alli Ramachari Illi Brahmachari follows the comedic chaos that ensues when Ramachari, a naïve and good-hearted village simpleton, ends up swapping places with his doppelgänger Raja, a sophisticated, foreign-educated industrialist. After a chance road accident brings the two lookalikes together, their identities are accidentally switched, leading to a series of humorous misunderstandings, culture clashes, and unexpected consequences in both their lives.

== Cast ==
- Jaggesh
- Swathi Ganguli
- Prathibha
- Abhijeeth
- Disco Shanti
- Killer Venkatesh
- Shankanaada Aravind
- Paapamma
- Navaneetha
- Doddanna
- Srinivasa Murthy
