= Bhanda Nanna Ganda =

- VCD cover
- Directed by: Raj Kishore
- Written by: Kunigal Nagabhushan (Dialogues)
- Story by: Raj kishore
- Produced by: N. Srinivas
- Starring: Jaggesh priyanka puthran Anjali Sudhakar
- Cinematography: C. Manohar
- Edited by: S. Manohar
- Music by: V. Manohar
- Production company: Sushma Films
- Distributed by: J. F. Productions
- Release date: 1992
- Country: India
- Language: Kannada

Bhanda Nanna Ganda is a 1992 Indian Kannada-language comedy drama film directed by Raj Kishor. In this film Jaggesh played his first lead role, and sung his first song ′Anthintha Gandu Nanalla′ in his career. Actor Ambareesh in an extended cameo appearance.

== Cast ==
- Jaggesh as Krishna
- Priyanka Puthran as Pramila
- Ambareesh as himself
- Anjali Sudhakar as Anjali
- Honnavalli Krishna
- Kulla Shantharaj
- Killer Venkatesh as Madan
- Thriller Manju
- Komal Kumar
- A. T. Raghu
- Paapamma as Krishna's grand mother
- Keerthiraj as Vikram, Jagadeeshwari husband
- Ashalatha as Jagadeeshwari
- Adugodi Srinivas
- Bank Janardhan

== Soundtrack ==
1. "Anthintha Gandu Naanalla" - Jaggesh
2. "O Mahila Manigale" - Jaggesh, Chandrika Gururaj
3. "Preethiya Theranu" - L. N. Shastri, Manjula Gururaj
4. "Yaarigu Endigu Anjade" - L. N. Shastri
