= Melkote Manja =

- Directed by: Jaggesh
- Written by: Jaggesh
- Produced by: R. Krishna
- Starring: Jaggesh; Aindrita Ray; Rangayana Raghu
- Cinematography: Dasari Seenu
- Edited by: K. M. Prakash
- Music by: Giridhar Diwan
- Production company: Sri Kodanda Beereshwara Swamy Films
- Release date: 10 February 2017
- Country: India
- Language: Kannada

Melkote Manja is a 2017 Indian Kannada-language comedy drama film written, enacted and directed by Jaggesh. This is the third film featuring Jaggesh as Manja after Eddelu Manjunatha (2009) and Manjunatha BA LLB (2012). The film also stars Aindrita Ray and Rangayana Raghu in the lead roles. It is a remake of the 2010 Telugu film Kalavar King.

It is a comedy film and a complete family entertainer. Jaggesh belongs to a lower-middle-class family. He is always under Debt. However, this trait itself will propel him to good acquaintances including his debtors who end up protecting him from even any danger he faces simply to get back their principal amount. Manja quips when asked to give up his ways, and be as his father saying it was a bore to live like a recluse if not his father. The film is shot in Melkote, which is another highlight of this movie. Aindrita & Jaggesh do justice to their roles.

Principal photography commenced in August 2014 in Melkote, Mandya district of Karnataka. Filming process had several delays and took two years for completion. The film was released on 10 February 2017 across Karnataka.

== Cast ==
- Jaggesh as Manja
- Aindrita Ray
- Rangayana Raghu
- Srinivas Prabhu
- Chandrakala
- Mimicry Dayanand
- Bank Janardhan
- Killer Venkatesh
- Srinivas Gowda
- Kurigalu Pradeep

== Soundtrack ==
Melkote Manja

Soundtrack album by Giridhar Diwan
- Released: 27 November 2016
- Genre: Feature film soundtrack
- Label: Anand Audio

The film's soundtrack is scored by Giridhar Diwan. His name was recommended to Jaggesh by his brother Komal Kumar. The audio rights of the film was acquired by Anand Audio and the complete album was released on 27 November 2016. Actor Puneeth Rajkumar was signed in to sing a song penned by Yogaraj Bhat. Rest of the songs are written by Ram Narayan and Jaggesh.

No.	Title	Lyrics	Singer(s)	Length
1.	"India Deshave"	Jaggesh	Tippu
2.	"Nenedidde Ondu"	Ram Narayan	Nakul Abhyankar
3.	"Kanmucchi Nenedaaga"	Jaggesh	Karthik, Anuradha Bhat
4.	"Manshangirodu (female)"	Ram Narayan	Sunitha
5.	"Manshangirodu (male)"	Ram Narayan	Karthik
6.	"Lifey Subjectu"	Yogaraj Bhat	Puneeth Rajkumar

== Reception ==
The Kannada film Melkote Manja, released in 2017, received mixed reviews from critics. The Times of India rated it 3/5, calling it a fun family entertainer with Jaggesh’s comedy as the highlight, though the story felt dated. Deccan Herald praised its light-hearted tone and Jaggesh’s charm, describing it as a good timepass. Vijaya Karnataka found it entertaining, especially for its local humor and Jaggesh’s performance. Prajavani also gave it a positive nod for its comedic appeal.
