= Michael Madhu =

Indian actor (died 2020)

- Born: 1966 Jan 01; Karnataka, India
- Died: 13 May 2020 (aged 50-51)
- Occupation: Actor

Michael Madhu (1969/70-May 13, 2020) was an Indian actor in the Kannada film industry. Some of the notable films of Michael Madhu as an actor include Bhajarangi (2013), Shhh! (1993), and Ashwamedha (1990).

== Career ==
Michael Madhu was part of more than three hundred films.

== Death ==
Michael Madhu died due to complications from a heart attack, on 13 May 2020.

== Selected filmography ==
- Suprabhatha (1988)
- Aswamedha (1990)...Dhanraj's henchman
- Shhh! (1993)
- Gold Medal (1994)...Michael
- Operation Antha (1995)
- Om (1995)
- Aata Hudugata (1995)
- Minugu Thare (1996)
- Gajanura Gandu (1996)
- Ee Hrudaya Ninagagi (1997)
- Yamalokadalli Veerappan (1998)
- A (1998)
- Surya Vamsha (1999)
- Meese Hottha Gandasige Demandappo Demandu (1999)
- A. K. 47 (1999) Kannada and Telugu Bi-lingual
- Snehaloka (1999)
- Papigala Lokadalli (2000)
- Yajamana (2000)
- Vaalee (2001)
- Neelambari (2001)
- Hey Nan Bheeshma Kano (2003)
- Kushalave Kshemave (2003)
- Daasa (2003)
- Durgi (2004)
- Good Luck (2006)
- Bhajarangi (2013)
- Uppi 2 (2015)
- French Biriyani (2020)

== See also ==
- List of people from Karnataka
- Cinema of Karnataka
- List of Indian film actors
- Cinema of India
