= Keerthiraj =

Indian film actor

- Occupation: Actor
- Years active: 1982–2015
- Children: 2 including Dharma

Keerthiraj is a former Indian actor in the Kannada film industry. Some of the notable films of Keerthiraj as an actor include S. P. Bhargavi (1991), Bhanda Nanna Ganda (1992), and Gajanura Gandu (1996).

== Career ==
Keerthiraj has been part of more than 100 feature films and was known for his villainous roles.

== Personal life ==
His father was Karnataka High Court judge K. Bhimaiah. He completed his Bachelor of Law. His children are Dharma (transl. Dharma) and Satya (transl. Truth), both of which are prominent in law.

== Selected filmography ==
1. Suvarna Sethuve (1982)
1. Brahma Vishnu Maheshwara (1988)
2. Krishna Nee Kunidaga (1989)
3. Prathap (1990)
4. Super Nanna Maga (1992)
5. Bhanda Nanna Ganda (1992)
6. Gajanura Gandu (1996)
7. Thavarige Baa Thangi (2002)
8. Godfather (2012)
9. Election (2013)
10. Story Kathe (2013)
11. Gharshane (2014)
12. Huccha Venkat (2014)
13. Ranna (2015)
14. Mumtaz (2015)

== See also ==
- List of people from Karnataka
- Cinema of Karnataka
- List of Indian film actors
- Cinema of India
