= Bevu Bella (1993 film) =

1993 film by S. Narayan

- Directed by: S. Narayan
- Written by: S. Narayan
- Produced by: J. Girija
- Starring: Jaggesh; Ragini
- Cinematography: P. K. H. Das
- Edited by: P. H. Eshwari Soundar Raj
- Music by: Hamsalekha
- Production company: Jyothi Krishna Movies
- Release date: 1993
- Running time: 134 minutes
- Country: India
- Language: Kannada

Bevu Bella (transl. Bitter Sweet) is a 1993 Indian Kannada-language romantic action film written and directed by S. Narayan. The film was produced by J. Girija in the banner of Jyothi Krishna Movies. The film stars Jaggesh and Ragini Roopa Sree in the lead roles while Lokesh, Ajay Kumar, director S. Narayan himself, and Shobharaj essay other important characters. The film has a musical score by Hamsalekha.

The title of the film is taken from the 1963 film starring Uday Kumar. The film opened to largely positive reviews and became a blockbuster. The film is considered to be one of the best films of director S. Narayan.

== Cast ==
- Jaggesh
- Ragini
- Lokesh
- Ajay Kumar
- S. Narayan
- Shobharaj
- Janakamma
- Padma Kumta

== Soundtrack ==
No.	Title	Length

== Release ==
Bevu Bella received a positive response and became a big commercial success catapulting S. Narayan and Jaggesh to immense fame in the Kannada film industry.

Jaggesh tweeted in Twitter that the film played a significant part in his life. He mentioned that the remuneration he got for the film helped him buy a piece of land in Malleshwaram and construct his dream house in Bangalore. Popular makeup artist Uma Maheshwar mentioned that in his initial struggling days he happened to meet Jaggesh and work in his films. In the process, he met senior make-up artist Mysore Venkatesh and happened to learn from him. He added that he received an amount of ₹100 per day which was a huge amount as he used to work for just ₹10 per day.
