= Patela (film) =

1999 film by Victory Vasu

- Video Cover
- Directed by: Victory Vasu
- Written by: Prakash Thrishuli (Dialogues)
- Screenplay by: Victory Vasu
- Story by: K. Bhagyaraj
- Based on: Raasukutti by K. Bhagyaraj
- Produced by: N. Purushotthama Rao; B. V. Chakrapani; M. Suresh; K. Srinivasamurthy; Jyothi Hanumantharaju
- Starring: Jaggesh; Payal Malhotra; Lokesh; Jayanthi
- Cinematography: Sundarnath Suvarna
- Edited by: S. Prasad
- Music by: Hamsalekha
- Release date: 1999
- Running time: 148 minutes (2 hours 28 minutes)
- Country: India
- Language: Kannada

Patela is a 1999 Indian Kannada action comedy film directed by Victory Vasu. The film stars Jaggesh, Payal Malhotra, Lokesh and Jayanthi in the lead roles while Avinash and Killer Venkatesh played the antagonists. The film has musical score by Hamsalekha.

The film is an adaptation of the 1992 Tamil film K. Bhagyaraj starrer Raasukutti. Raasukutti was earlier remade in Hindi with Govinda, as Raja Babu. Jaggesh played the role of a naive man who faces trouble in his love life due to him being illiterate.

== Cast ==
- Jaggesh
- Payal Malhotra
- Lokesh
- Jayanthi
- Tennis Krishna
- Avinash
- Killer Venkatesh
- Prasanna
- Apoorva
- Mandeep Rai
- Mohan Kumar
- K. D. Venkatesh
- Stunt Siddu
- Bank Janardhan
- Satyajith
- Honnavalli Krishna
- Sarigama Viji
