= Jaggesh =

Indian actor and politician (born 1963)

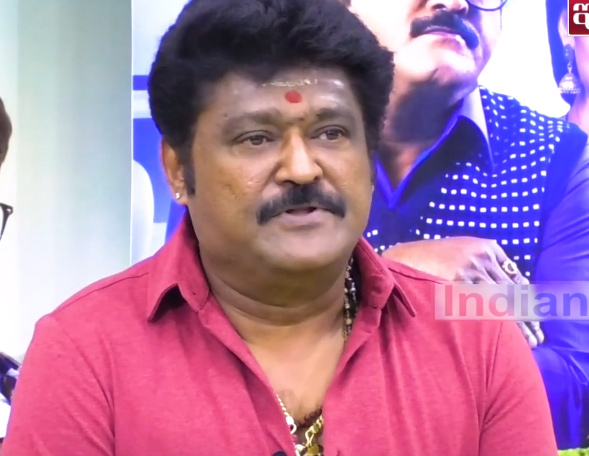
- Jaggesh in November 2019

Member of Parliament, Rajya Sabha
- Incumbent
- Assumed office 1 July 2022
- Preceded by: K. C. Ramamurthy
- Constituency: Karnataka

Member of Karnataka Legislative Council
- In office 4 February 2010 – 3 February 2016
- Constituency: Nominated

Member of Karnataka Legislative Assembly
- In office 16 May 2008 – 21 September 2009
- Preceded by: M. T. Krishnappa
- Succeeded by: M. T. Krishnappa
- Constituency: Turuvekere

Personal details
- Born: Eshwar Gowda; 17 March 1963 (age 63) Turuvekere, Karnataka, India
- Party: Bharatiya Janata Party (since 2009)
- Other political affiliations: Indian National Congress (2008–2009)
- Spouse: Parimala Jaggesh (m. 1984)
- Children: 2; including Gururaj
- Relatives: Komal (brother)
- Occupation: Actor; film producer; film director; television presenter; politician

Eshwar Gowda (born 17 March 1963), known professionally as Jaggesh, is an Indian politician, film actor, director and producer, who mainly works in Kannada cinema. Known for his roles in comedy films, he is popular by the moniker 'Navarasa Nayaka'. Considered one of the popular actors, Jaggesh has won Karnataka State Film Awards and Suvarna Film Awards for his acting.

Jaggesh started his film career by playing minor part in Ibbani Karagithu (1982) and then he essayed supporting roles in Ranadheera (1988), Ranaranga (1988), Yuddha Kaanda (1989), Rani Maharani (1990), C. B. I. Shiva (1991) among others and also worked as an assistant director for several films. His first lead role came with Bhanda Nanna Ganda in 1992 but his major breakthrough came in Tharle Nan Maga in the same year.

He is a Member of Parliament, Rajya Sabha from Karnataka since 2022 and the spokesperson of the Bharatiya Janata Party in Karnataka.

== Early and personal life ==
Jaggesh, born on 17 March 1963 as Eshwar is originally from Mayasandra (Jadeya Mayasandra) of Turuvekere Taluk in Tumkur district to a Vokkaliga family.

Jaggesh married 15-year-old Parimala on 22 March 1984 with whom he has sons Gururaj (b. 1987) and Yathiraj (b. 1992). Parimala's brother Sunder Ramu is also an actor.

== Career ==
=== Film ===
He debuted in Ibbani Karagithu (1983) starring Anant Nag and Lakshmi after leaving a film based on AIDS midway. After playing supporting roles for almost 10 years, he got his first lead role in Tharle Nan Maga (1993), directed by Upendra in his directorial debut. His first big grosser was Bhanda Nanna Ganda. In a career spanning 40 years he has acted in nearly 150 films, with notable films including Super Nanna Maga, Server Somanna, Bevu Bella, Mata, Eddelu Manjunatha, Vaastu Prakaara and Neer Dose. He is popularly known as 'Navarasa Nayaka' of Kananda cinema for his mannerisms and comic timing. He directed two films, Guru and Melkote Manja.

He became the celebrity judge for the comedy show Comedy Khiladigalu and joined the reality show Khiladi Kutumba.

=== Politics ===
Jaggesh's political affiliation was with the Indian National Congress (INC). He claimed that his father had been a "Mandal Panchayath President, and mother a Zilla Panchayat member in Tumkur." In the 2004 Karnataka Legislative Assembly election, Jaggesh contested Turuvekere, and won with a healthy margin but resigned from the INC to join the BJP. He served as Member of Legislative Council and held the cabinet rank as the vice-chairman of the Karnataka State Road Transport Corporation (K.S.R.T.C.).

== Filmography ==
- Note: All films are in Kannada.

Year	Film	Role	Notes
1982	Ibbani Karagithu		
1985	Shwetha Gulabi	Krishna	
1986	Hosa Neeru		
1987	Sangrama		
1988	Ranadheera	Maadhu	
1988	Bhoomi Thayane		
1988	Sangliyana		
1988	Ranaranga	Jaggu	
1989	Yuddha Kaanda	Tony	
1989	Manmatha Raja	Ganesh	
1989	Parashuram	M. Shivaraj's son	
1989	Poli Huduga		
1989	Raja Yuvaraja		
1989	Krishna Nee Kunidaga		
1989	Narasimha	Bansi Lal	
1990	Ajay Vijay		
1990	Ranabheri		
1990	Kempu Gulabi		
1990	Rani Maharani		
1990	Prathap	Tribesman	
1990	Challenge		
1990	Thrinethra	Suman	
1991	Varagala Bete		
1991	Sundarakanda		
1991	Kadana		
1991	C. B. I. Shiva	Chandru	
1991	Rollcall Ramakrishna	Nagaraj	
1991	Kalla Malla		
1991	Rowdy & MLA		
1991	Aranyadalli Abhimanyu		
1992	Hatamari Hennu Kiladi Gandu		
1992	Sindhoora Thilaka		
1992	Solillada Saradara	Manohar	
1992	Kanasina Rani	Bhaskar	
1992	Tharle Nan Maga	Santosh	First lead role
1992	Sahasi		
1992	Bhanda Nanna Ganda	Krishna	
1992	Police File		
1992	Megha Mandara		
1992	Super Nanna Maga	Sundar	
1992	Alli Ramachari Illi Brahmachari		
1993	Server Somanna	Soma	
1993	Gadibidi Ganda		
1993	Bombaat Huduga		
1993	Gundana Maduve	Gunda	
1993	Shivanna	Shiva	
1993	Urvashi Kalyana		
1993	Bevu Bella		
1993	Military Mava		
1993	Rupayi Raja		
1994	Rayara Maga		
1994	Bhairava	Bhairava	
1994	Beda Krishna Ranginata	Krishna	
1994	Indrana Gedda Narendra	Narendra	
1994	Prema Simhasana	Rudra, Vikram, Kali	Triple role
1995	Bal Nan Maga		
1995	Eshwar	Eshwar	
1996	Soma	Soma	
1996	Pattanakke Banda Putta	Putta	
1997	Bhanda Alla Bahaddur		
1997	Aliya Alla Magala Ganda		
1997	Ranganna	Ranga	
1997	Anna Andre Nammanna		
1998	Arjun Abhimanyu	Arjun	
1998	Jaidev	Jaidev	
1998	Maathina Malla		
1998	Mari Kannu Hori Myage	Vaikunta	
1998	Yaare Neenu Cheluve		Cameo
1998	Jagath Kiladi	Vijay Kumar, Bhargava	Dual role
1998	Veeranna	Veeranna	
1999	Drona	Drona alias CM	
1999	Patela	Patela	
1999	Kubera		
1999	Nannaseya Hoove	Ravi	
1999	Aaha Nanna Maduveyante	Raja	
2000	Kiladi		
2000	Mundaithe Oora Habba	Seena	
2000	Sultan		
2001	Jipuna Nanna Ganda	Padmanabh	
2001	Shukradeshe	Guru	
2001	Jodi	Sunil	
2001	Jeetendra	Jeetendra	
2001	Prema Rajya		
2001	Rusthum		
2001	Haalu Sakkare		
2002	Vamshakkobba		
2002	Makeup	K. D. Roy, Doddamma	Dual role Also producer
2003	Kasu Iddone Basu		
2003	Huchana Maduveli Undone Jaana	Gopalkrishna	
2003	Yaardo Duddu Yallammana Jathre	Gowda	
2004	Aagodella Olledakke		
2004	Nija	Mudhol I.P.S/Kencha	
2004	Rama Krishna	Krishna	
2005	Mr. Bakra	Gopal	
2006	Pandavaru		
2006	Honeymoon Express	Jaggi	
2006	Mata	Venkatesh	100th film Won - Karnataka State Film Award for Best Supporting Actor (Rejected)
2006	Tenali Rama	Rama	
2007	Govinda Gopala	Govinda	
2007	Manmatha	Puttaswamy, Soorya	Dual Role
2007	Ganesha	Ganesh Patil	
2008	Nee Tata Naa Birla	Jaggu	
2008	Kodagana Koli Nungitha	Balasubramanya	
2008	Dheemaku	Jaggesh alias Jaggi	Cameo
2009	Chickpete Sachagalu	Jaggi	
2009	Chamkaisi Chindi Udaysi	Himself	Cameo
2009	Eddelu Manjunatha	Manjunatha	Suvarna Film Award for Best Actor
2010	Lift Kodla	Krishna	
2010	Aithalakkadi	Himself	Special appearance
2011	Double Decker	Paramesh, Ganapa	Dual roles
2011	Dudde Doddappa	Sudhama	
2011	Allide Nammane Illi Bande Summane	Himself	Cameo
2011	Bodyguard	Jaikrishna	
2012	Manjunatha BA LLB	Manjunatha	
2013	CID Eesha	Shankar	
2014	Cool Ganesha	Ganesha	
2014	Agraja	Sidda	
2014	Software Ganda	Manu	
2015	Vaastu Prakaara	Mama	
2015	Dove	Himself	Special appearance in a song
2016	Neer Dose	Jaggesh Kumar	Nominated—SIIMA Award for Best Actor in a Leading Role (Male)
2017	Melkote Manja	Manja	Also director
2017	Mugulu Nage	Himself	Special appearance in a song
2018	8MM Bullet	Murthi	
2019	Premier Padmini	Vinayaka	
2019	Kalidasa Kannada Meshtru	Kalidasa	
2022	Totapuri: Chapter 1	Eeregowda	
2023	Raghavendra Stores	Hayavadana	
2023	Thothapuri: Chapter 2	Eeregowda	
2024	Ranganayaka	Ranganayaka	
2026	Raktha Kashmira	Himself	Special appearance song in "star star"

=== Director ===
Year	Film	Notes
2012	Guru	
2017	Melkote Manja	

=== As playback singer ===
Year	Title	Song	Music director	Co-singer(s)
1992	Bhanda Nanna Ganda	"Anthintha Gandu Naanalla"	V. Manohar	—
1992	Bhanda Nanna Ganda	"O Mahila Manigale"	V. Manohar	Chandrika
1992	Super Nanna Maga	"Baarayya Sanjege"	V. Manohar	Manjula Gururaj
1992	Super Nanna Maga	"Thaalavendare Rhythm"	V. Manohar	L. N. Shastri
1992	Alli Ramachari Illi Brahmachari	"Jumma Jumma"	V. Manohar	L. N. Shastri, Latha Hamsalekha
1993	Gundana Maduve	"Maduvemaneli Maduvanagitthi"	V. Manohar	Manjula Gururaj
1994	Beda Krishna Ranginata	"Kogileye Kogileye"	V. Manohar	Chaitra H. G.
1994	Beda Krishna Ranginata	"Naanu Endu Gellonu"	V. Manohar	—
1994	Beda Krishna Ranginata	"Thrilling Thrilling"	V. Manohar	Manjula Gururaj
1997	Banda Alla Bahadur	"Bisi Bisi" (Reprise)	V. Manohar	K. S. Chithra
1998	Jagath Kiladi	"I Love For You"	Rajan–Nagendra	Anuradha Sriram
1999	Drona	"L O V E Aadru"	Hamsalekha	Soumya
1999	Kubera	"Sketch Bold Sketch"	Rajesh Ramanath	Sudarshan
2001	Shukradeshe	Vijayanand	"Jambada Koli"	—
2001	Shukradeshe	Vijayanand	"Kannada Kannada"	—
2001	Rusthum	"Mallige Mallige"	Sadhu Kokila	Surekha
2003	Huchana Maduveli Undone Jaana	"Chikkammi Kel"	Prashant Raj	—
2003	Yaardo Duddu Yallammana Jathre	Havadru Kachabarda	V. Manohar	—
2003	Crazy Boys	"Haavad Ru"	V. Manohar	—
2005	Mr. Bakra	"Metgontho Nange"	V. Manohar	Sangeetha Madhuri
2005	Mr. Bakra	"Bhamini Rukmini"	V. Manohar	—
2011	Bodyguard	"Nambidora Maneya"	Vinay Chandra	—
2012	Manjunatha BA LLB	"Brahma Ninge Jodusthini"	Vinay Chandra	—
2012	Guru	"Guru"	Vinay Chandra	—
2013	Cool Ganesha	"Beautifullu Hennu"	Manikanth Kadri	Indu Nagaraj
2013	Cool Ganesha	"Idhi Manakey Sadhyam"	Manikanth Kadri	Gurukiran, Shamitha Malnad
2014	Sachin! Tendulkar Alla	"Suttho Bhumi Ane"	Rajesh Ramanath	—
2017	Jnana Pada	"Surya Badalaagavna"	Sagar Gururaj	—
2025	Vidayapati	"Ayyo Vidhiye"	Dossmode	—

== Television ==
Year	Title	Role(s)	Note(s)	Ref.
2012	Kaiyalli Koti Helbittu Hoderi	Host		
2017	Sye to Dance	Judge	Season 3	
2016- 2022	Comedy Khiladigalu	Judge	4 Seasons	
2017	Weekend with Ramesh	Guest	Season 3	
2017	Khiladi Kutumba	Permanent Guest	Season 1	
2018- 2020	Comedy Khiladigalu Championship	Judge	2 Seasons	
2019	Kannadada Kanmani	Judge		
