= Prathap (1990 film) =

- Title card
- Directed by: V. Somashekhar
- Written by: V. Somashekhar
- Produced by: S. Prathibha Devi
- Starring: Arjun Sarja; Malashri; Sudharani; Devaraj
- Cinematography: Sundarnath Suvarna
- Edited by: Victor Yadav
- Music by: Hamsalekha
- Production company: Prathibhe Films
- Release date: 25 September 1990
- Running time: 163 minutes
- Country: India
- Language: Kannada

Prathap is a 1990 Indian Kannada-language action film written and directed by V. Somashekhar. It stars Arjun Sarja, Malashri and Sudharani. The soundtrack and background score were composed by Hamsalekha.

== Premise ==
Rani is a tribeswoman, who saves a person named Pratap from being chased by the police. She soon falls in love with him and learns about Prathap's past as an Inspector who tried to exterminate illegal activities in the city and got framed by his enemies. He also lost his loved ones in the process. Learning this, Rani decides to help Prathap in avenging his personal loss.

== Cast ==
- Arjun Sarja as SP Prathap
- Malashri as Rani
- Sudharani as Shanthi
- Vajramuni as Mamgya
- Maanu
- Doddanna as Bhairava
- Sathyajith as tribal chief
- Devaraj as Devu
- Jai Jagadish as Jaggu
- Keerthiraj as Prabhu
- Mukhyamantri Chandru as Chief Minister
- Dheerendra Gopal as Home Minister Ullagaddi
- Sudheer as Finance Minister Bendigeri
- Lohithaswa as IGP Narasimha Murthy
- Lakshman as Shivanand
- Jaggesh as tribesman
- Ashok Rao as Dharmaparvatha Dayanand
- Prithviraj as Govinda Rao
- Krishne Gowda as judge
- Negro Johnny
- Shivaprakash
- M. S. Karanth as Rajashekhar
- Y. R. Ashwath Narayan
- Chikkanna
- Mico Seetharam
- Bangalore Nagesh
- Sarigama Viji as Suri
- B. K. Shankar
- Rathnakar as priest
- Devaraju
- Aravind

== Soundtrack ==
The soundtrack of the film was composed and lyrics written by Hamsalekha. The audio was released by Lahari Music. The song "Prema Baraha" inspired the name of a 2018 film, and the song was reused in the film. Coincidentally, Aishwarya Arjun, who stars in that film, was born during the making of the song. Arjun called the song one of his favourites and keeps it as his caller tune.

Track listing
No.	Title	Lyrics	Singer(s)	Length
1.	"Dhimgudthade Jhuygudthade"	Hamsalekha	S. P. Balasubrahmanyam, Manjula Gururaj
2.	"Thamboorayya Thanthi Meetayya"	Hamsalekha	S. P. Balasubrahmanyam, Manjula Gururaj
3.	"Kaadu Kali"	Hamsalekha	Manjula Gururaj
4.	"Ee Jogada Jalapatha"	Hamsalekha	S. P. Balasubrahmanyam, Chandrika Gururaj
5.	"Prema Baraha"	Hamsalekha	S. P. Balasubrahmanyam, Chandrika Gururaj
6.	"Yaravva Manaseleyonu"	Hamsalekha	S. P. Balasubrahmanyam, Manjula Gururaj
