= Drona (1999 film) =

1999 film by H Vasudev

- Directed by: H. Vasudev
- Written by: Royal Films; Dialogues: J M Prahlad
- Produced by: J. G. Krishna
- Starring: Jaggesh; Monica Bedi
- Cinematography: J. G. Krishna
- Edited by: Shyam Yadav
- Music by: Hamsalekha
- Production company: Royal Films
- Release date: 26 February 1999
- Country: India
- Language: Kannada

Drona is a 1999 Indian Kannada-language romantic drama film directed by H Vasudev and starring Jaggesh and Monica Bedi.

== Cast ==
- Jaggesh as Drona alias CM
- Monica Bedi as Swetha
- Komal
- Avinash as JD
- Shobaraj
- Shani Mahadevappa
- Vaijanath Biradar
- Kunigal Nagabhushan
- Mandeep Roy

== Production ==
The film was produced by cinematographer J. G. Krishna, who was Jaggesh's classmate. The muhurat took place on 29 November 1998 at Devayya Park, Bangalore.

== Soundtrack ==
The music was composed and written by Hamsalekha and released under the Lahari Music label.

Track listing
No.	Title	Singer(s)	Length
1.	"Jai Andre Jai"	Mano	4:44
2.	"Hai Gulebukaavali"	Mano, K. S. Chithra	4:32
3.	"L O V E Aadru"	Jaggesh, Soumya	5:21
4.	"Yaarinda Hoovondu"	Rajesh Krishnan, K. S. Chithra	4:40
5.	"Ele Ranga"	B. Jayashree	5:05
Total length:			24:22

== Reception ==
A critic from Deccan Herald wrote that "This is a film for people who enjoy movies without bothering about any logic in the story".
