= Dheerendra Gopal =

Indian actor

- Born: Gopal Rao; 12 April 1940; Holenarasipura, India
- Died: 25 December 2000 (aged 60); Harihar, India
- Occupation: Actor
- Spouse: Sunandamma

Gopal Rao, known by his stage name Dheerendra Gopal, was an Indian film and stage actor known for his work in Kannada films. After making his film debut with Subhadra Kalyana (1972), he received recognition for his performance in Puttanna Kanagal's Paduvaaralli Pandavaru (1978).

== Career ==
Gopal was noticed at a young age by Gubbi Veeranna. Gubbi Veeranna saw him solo act at a school and was impressed with his performance and invited him to be part of his company. The young Gopal donned the main role in Yechchama Nayaka and never looked back thereafter. He later began acting in films. His first film appearance was in Naagarahaavu. Over the years, he acted in over 180 Kannada films and became popular for his role as politician-villain. He earned recognition from Puttanna Kanagal's film "Paduvarahalli Pandavaru". His other popular films were Subhadra Kalyana, Gajapathi Garvabhanga, Simha Jodi, Naga Kala Bhairava, Nanjundi Kalyana and Annaiah. Anjali Geethanjali was his last film.

Gopal released over 300 political-satire dialogues on audio cassettes, that became popular.

Gopal was a lover of theatre and acted in hundreds of plays.

== Death ==
Gopal's health deteriorated in 1999 after a severe attack of jaundice. He died of a heart attack at his residence in Harihar on 25 December 2000, aged 60. He was survived by his wife Sunandamma, daughter Vidyavathi and two sons, Narendra Babu and Sudheendra. The funeral was held on 26 December, at the Hindu Rudrabhoomi in Harihar.

== Partial filmography ==
- Subhadra Kalyana (1972)
- Naagarahaavu (1972)..Tukaram
- Bhootayyana Maga Ayyu (1974)...Linga
- Paduvarahalli Pandavaru (1978)
- Nanobba Kalla (1979)...Satish
- Sahasa Simha (1982)...Ratanlal
- Hosa Theerpu (1983)...Landlord
- Raktha Thilaka (1984)...Nagappa
- Aahuti (1985)
- Vajra Mushti (1985)...Kulkarni
- Digvijaya (1987)..."Bide" Mahesh
- Nanjundi Kalyana (1989)
- Gajapathi Garvabhanga (1989)
- Prathap (1990)...Home Minister Ullagaddi
- Bombat Hendthi (1992)
- Banni Ondsala Nodi (1992)
- Gruhalakshmi (1992)
- Sriramachandra (1992)
- Rupayi Raja (1992)
- Mana Mecchida Sose (1992)
- Annaiah (1993)
- Kumkuma Bhagya (1993)...Garudachari
- Gadibidi Ganda (1993)
- Bhagavan Sri Saibaba (1993)...Boda Saheb
- Putnanja (1995)
- Simhada Mari (1997)
- Yamalokadalli Veerappan (1998)
- Mari Kannu Hori Myage (1998)...Annaiah
- Anjali Geethanjali (2001)

== Awards ==
Dheerendra Gopal was a recipient of the Karnataka Nataka Academy Award and the Rajyotsava Award.
