= Sathyajith (Kannada actor) =

Indian film actor (1949–2021)

- Born: 2 June 1949; Hubballi
- Died: 10 October 2021 (aged 72)
- Other name: Satyajit
- Occupations: Film actor; director; writer
- Spouse: Sophia Begum
- Children: 3

Syed Nizamuddin, known by his professional name Satyajit or Satyajith (2 June 1949 – 10 October 2021), was an Indian actor in the Kannada film industry. Some of the notable films of Satyajit as an actor include Putnanja (1995), Shiva Mecchida Kannappa (1988), Chaitrada Premanjali (1992) and Apthamitra (2004).

== Career ==
Satyajit has been part of more than six hundred and fifty Kannada films.

== Selected filmography ==
- Ankush (1986) as Subhlya (Hindi film)
- Aruna Raaga (1986)
- Nyayakke Shikshe (1987)
- Mr. Raja (1987)
- Anthima Theerpu (1987)...Satyaraj
- Athiratha Maharatha (1987)...Pratap
- Thayigobba Karna (1988)
- Shiva Mecchida Kannappa (1988)
- Ranaranga (1988)
- Nammoora Raja (1988)
- Mahadasohi Sharana Basava (1988)
- Bhoomi Thayane (1988)
- Thayigobba Karna (1988)
- Nyayakkaagi Naanu (1989)
- Yuddha Kaanda (1989)
- Raja Yuvaraja (1989)
- Padma Vyuha (1989)...Mysore Mohanraj
- Nyayakkaagi Naanu (1989)
- Madhuri (1989)
- Indrajith (1989)
- Mouna Horata (1990)
- Prathap (1990)
- Ajay Vijay (1990)
- Nammoora Hammera (1990)
- Police Lockup (1992)
- Mysore Jana (1992)
- Chaitrada Premanjali (1992)
- Gadibidi Ganda (1993)
- Mahendra Varma (1993)...Kariyappa
- Mane Devru (1993)
- Sangharsha (1993)
- Jailor Jagannath (1993)...Satyamurthy
- Chinna (1994)
- Mandyada Gandu (1994)
- Yama Kinkara (1995)
- Putnanja (1995)
- Mojugara Sogasugara (1995)
- Lady Police (1995)
- Killer Diary (1995)
- Emergency (1995)
- Police Story (1996)
- Soma (1996)
- Simhadri (1996)
- Sathya Sangharsha (1996)
- Gulaabi (1996)
- Circle Inspector (1996)
- Boss (1996)
- Aayudha (1996)
- Aadithya (1996)
- Honey Moon (1997)
- Ellaranthalla Nanna Ganda (1997)
- Balida Mane (1997)
- Yamalokadalli Veerappan (1998)
- Simhada Guri (1998)
- One Man Army (1998)
- Kurubana Rani (1998)
- King (1998)
- Jagath Kiladi (1998)
- Arjun Abhimanyu (1998)
- My Dear Tiger (1998)...Badrinath
- Vishwa (1999)
- Patela (1999)
- Mr. X (1999)
- Garuda (1999)
- Nee Nanna Jeeva (2000)
- Minchu (2000)
- Durgada Huli (2000)
- Sathyameva Jayathe (2001)
- Appu (2002)
- Dhumm (2002)
- Abhi (2003)
- Sri Ram (2003)
- Daasa (2003)
- Apthamitra (2004)
- Shri (2006)
- Ashoka (2006)
- Jootata (2006)
- Parodi (2007)
- Hudugaata (2007)
- Arasu (2007)
- Indra (2008)
- Bhagyada Balegara (2009)
- Rajani (2009)
- School Master (2010)
- Oriyardori Asal (2011) (Tulu film)
- Hero Nanalla (2011)
- Aacharya (2011)
- Swayam Krushi (2011)
- Bhadra (2011)
- Prince (2011)
- Shravana (2011)
- Kal Manja (2011)
- Manasina Mathu (2011)
- Ee Sanje (2011)
- Kanteerava (2011)
- Prem Adda (2012)
- See U (2012)
- Sangolli Rayanna (2012)
- Snehitaru (2012)
- Ondu Kshanadalli (2012)
- Kalpana (2012)
- Jaihind (2012)
- Godfather (2012)
- Paper Doni (2012)
- Kiladi Kitty (2012)
- Narasimha (2012)
- Rana Prathap (2012)
- Lucky (2012)
- Love Junction (2013)
- Pyarge Aagbittaite (2013)
- Silk (2013)
- Akka Pakka (2013)
- Varadhanayaka (2013)
- Ee Ibbani (2014)
- Namaste Madam (2014)
- Paramashiva (2014)
- Tirupathi Express (2014)
- Adyaksha (2014)
- Hara (2014)
- Maanikya (2014)
- Shivajinagara (2014)
- Sharp Shooter (2015)
- Shambho Mahadeva (2015)
- Vamshoddharaka (2015)
- Thippaji Circle (2015)
- Uppi 2 (2015)
- Ranna (2015)
- Rana Vikrama (2015)
- Katte (2015)
- Mythri (2015)
- Jackson (2015)
- Viraat (2016)
- Mahaveera Machideva (2016)
- Ranatantra (2016)
- Hey Sarasu (2016)
- Raja Loves Radhe (2018)
- 2nd Half (2018)
- Gadayuddha (2023)...Police inspector

== Personal life ==
Satyajit was married to Sophia Begum, and they have a daughter named Akthar Swaleha who is a pilot by profession in Bangalore. Their first son Akash Jith is an actor too in the Kannada film industry.
