= Soundarya filmography =

Soundarya was an Indian actress who worked predominantly in Telugu films in addition to Kannada and Tamil films. She made her film debut through the Kannada film Gandharva (1992). The following year, she debuted in Telugu and Tamil with the films Manavarali Pelli and Ponnumani respectively. She received critical acclaim for her role in the latter. Between 1993 and 1994, she appeared in several commercially successful Telugu films, notably Rajendrudu Gajendrudu, Mayalodu, Number One and Hello Brother. However, she had her career breakthrough with Ammoru (1995), a film which garnered her the Filmfare Award for Best Actress – Telugu. In 1996, she featured in the successful film Pavitra Bandham and won the Nandi Award for Best Actress. The success of these films established her as the leading actress of Telugu cinema. She achieved further success with films like Pelli Chesukundam, Choodalani Vundi, Dongaata and Arunachalam, the latter being her first venture with Rajinikanth.

Her portrayal of an NRI woman falling prey to the extreme abuse by her father-in-law in the film Anthahpuram (1998) was highly applauded by critics. She won several accolades, including her second Filmfare Best Actress award and the Nandi Special Jury Award. In 1999, she featured in the romantic drama Raja, which earned her the third Filmfare Best Actress award as well as the Industry Hit film Padayappa. The same year, she appeared opposite Amitabh Bachchan in the film Sooryavansham, her first and only venture in Bollywood. Her career saw a further rise with films like Annayya, Ninne Premistha, Azad, 9 Nelalu and Eduruleni Manishi, which garnered her positive reviews. In 2002, she acted as the protagonist and co-produced the film Dweepa, which won numerous accolades including two National Film Awards. Swetha Naagu became her last release while being alive; it was her 100th film. Post her death, Siva Shankar and Apthamitra marked her posthumous releases. She was also awarded the Filmfare Award for Best Actress – Kannada for Apthamitra posthumously.

== Telugu films ==
List of Telugu films acted by Soundarya
Year	Title	Role	Notes	Ref.
1993	Manavarali Pelli	Soundarya	Telugu Debut	
1993	Rajendrudu Gajendrudu	Alaka		
1993	Mayalodu	Siri		
1993	Inspector Jhansi	Jhansi		
1993	Mayadari Mosagadu	Latha		
1993	Asalae Pellaina Vanni	Manga		
1993	Donga Alludu	Latha		
1993	Anna Chellelu	Seetha		
1993	Urmila	Sunitha		
1994	Number One	Chitra		
1994	Hello Brother	Ooha		
1994	Allari Premikudu	Jhansi		
1994	Super Police	Bharati		
1994	Maa Voori Maaraju	Sathyavathi		
1994	Madam	Soundarya		
1994	Top Hero	Chitra		
1994	Raithu Bharatam	Radha		
1995	Amma Donga	Kumari Padmapriya		
1995	Chilakapachcha Kaapuram	Sathyavathi		
1995	Raja Simham	Sundari		
1995	Pedarayudu	Bharathi		
1995	Bhale Bullodu	Radha		
1995	Amma Naa Kodala	Neelima		
1995	Vetagadu	Priya		
1995	Balaraju Bangaru Pellam	Videhi		
1995	Mayadari Kutumbam	—		
1995	Maya Bazaar	Herself		
1995	Ammoru	Bhavani	Filmfare Award for Best Actress – Telugu	
1995	Rikshavodu	Narasakka		
1996	Puttinti Gowravam	Jyothi		
1996	Ramudochadu	Sundaralakshmi		
1996	Intlo Illalu Vantintlo Priyuralu	Seetha		
1996	Jagadekaveerudu	Soundaya		
1996	Prema Pranayam	Sudha		
1996	Pavitra Bandham	Radha	Nominated — Filmfare Award for Best Actress – Telugu	
1996	Maa Inti Adapaduchu	Janaki		
1997	Dongaata	Subbalakshmi	Nominated — Filmfare Award for Best Actress – Telugu	
1997	Pelli Chesukundam	Shanti		
1997	Priyaragalu	Priya		
1997	Aaro Pranam	Aakanksha		
1997	Taraka Ramudu	Taraka		
1997	Ma Ayana Bangaram	Vennela/Shruthi (Note: Soundarya played a single character with two or more names.)		
1997	Oosi Naa Maradala	Kanchana Mala		
1998	Pelli Peetalu	Anjali		
1998	Raayudu	Madhavi		
1998	Choodalani Vundi	Padmavati		
1998	Sri Ramulayya	Seethamma		
1998	Suryudu	Prameela		
1998	Subhavartha	Meghana		
1998	Anthahpuram	Bhanumati	Filmfare Award for Best Actress – Telugu	
1998	Eshwar Alla	Durga Bhavani		
1998	Thambulalu	Seetha		
1999	Raja	Anjali	Filmfare Award for Best Actress – Telugu	
1999	Premaku Velayera	Madhavi/Malati		
1999	Arundhati	Arundhati		
1999	Anaganaga Oka Ammai	Sandhya		
1999	Manavudu Danavudu	Ratna		
2000	Annayya	Mahalakshmi	Nominated — Filmfare Award for Best Actress – Telugu	
2000	Ravanna	Sirisha		
2000	Postman	Archana		
2000	9 Nelalu	Savitri		
2000	Moodu Mukkalaata	Shravani		
2000	Sardukupodaam Randi	Radha Rani		
2000	Ninne Premistha	Meghamala		
2000	Azad	Anjali		
2000	Jayam Manadera	Uma		
2001	Devi Putrudu	Karuna		
2001	Eduruleni Manishi	Vasundhara		
2001	Kalisi Naduddam	Vijaya		
2001	Sri Manjunatha	Katyayani		
2001	Naa Manasistha Raa	Nandini		
2001	Adhipathi	Jagan's fiancée		
2002	Kondaveeti Simhasanam	Chitti		
2002	Premaku Swagatam	Lahari		
2002	Gelupu	—	Unreleased film	
2003	Seetayya	Seeta		
2003	Prema Donga	—		
2004	Swetha Naagu	Madhumati		
2004	Shiva Shankar	Padma	Posthumous release	
2020	Narthanasala	Draupadi	Posthumous release (shelved by actor-director, Nandamuri Balakrishna)	

== Other languages ==
- Films in Kannada, Tamil, Malayalam and Hindi

Year	Title	Role	Language	Notes	Ref.
1992	Rajadhi Raja	Shakuntala	Kannada	Debut film	
1992	Nanna Thangi	Madhuri	Kannada		
1992	Baa Nanna Preethisu	Asha	Kannada		
1992	Gandharva	Sudha	Kannada		
1993	Ponnumani	Chinthamani	Tamil	Tamil Debut	
1993	Vijaya Kranthi	Lucky	Kannada		
1994	Thooguve Krishnana	Meena	Kannada		
1995	Muthu Kaalai	Poonjolai	Tamil		
1995	Dear Son Maruthu	Rani	Tamil		
1996	Sipayi	Shanthi	Kannada		
1996	Senathipathi	Aishwarya	Tamil		
1997	Arunachalam	Vedhavalli	Tamil		
1998	Kaathala Kaathala	Stella Sundari	Tamil		
1998	Doni Sagali	Kshama	Kannada		
1999	Mannavaru Chinnavaru	Meghana	Tamil	partially reshot version of Subhavartha	
1999	Aryabhata	Bharati	Kannada		
1999	Padayappa	Vasundhara	Tamil		
1999	Naanu Nanna Hendthiru	Seetha	Kannada		
1999	Sooryavansham	Radha	Hindi	Hindi debut	
2000	Naga Devathe	Goddess Nagamma	Kannada		
2001	Sri Manjunatha	Katyayani	Kannada		
2001	Thavasi	Priyadharshini	Tamil	Nominated—Filmfare Award for Best Actress – Tamil	
2002	Ivan	Dheetchanya	Tamil	Nominated—Filmfare Award for Best Actress – Tamil	
2002	Dweepa	Nagi	Kannada	Also producer; Filmfare Award for Best Actress – Kannada	
2002	Yathrakarude Sradhakku	Jyothi	Malayalam	Malayalam debut	
2003	Chokka Thangam	Pavalam	Tamil		
2003	Kilichundan Mampazham	Aamina	Malayalam		
2003	Vijayadashami	Goddess Bhuvaneshwari	Kannada		
2003	Sri Renukadevi	Renuka Devi	Kannada		
2004	Swetha Nagara	Madhumati	Kannada		
2004	Apthamitra	Ganga / Nagavalli (Note: Soundarya played dual roles.)	Kannada	Posthumous release Filmfare Award for Best Actress – Kannada	
2008	Navashakthi Vaibhava	Goddess Renukadevi	Kannada	Posthumous release (using archive footage)	

== Television ==
Year	Title	Language	Notes	Ref.
1998	Gruhabhanga	Kannada	Producer; TV Series based on S. L. Bhyrappa's novel of the same name.	

== See also ==
- List of Indian film actresses
- Telugu cinema
