= Navashakthi Vaibhava =

- Directed by: Om Sai Prakash
- Written by: J K Bharavi; Chindodi Bangaresh
- Story by: J K Bharavi; Chindodi Bangaresh
- Produced by: Suresh Kumar M Jain
- Starring: Ramkumar; Shruti; Prema; Jayamala; Sudharani; Soundarya; Vijayalakshmi; Ruthika
- Cinematography: Dasari Seenu
- Edited by: P R Soundar Raj
- Music by: Hamsalekha
- Production company: United Film Productions
- Release date: 1 February 2008
- Running time: 128 minutes
- Country: India
- Language: Kannada

Navashakthi Vaibhava is a 2008 Indian Kannada-language drama film written by J K Bharavi and Chindodi Bangaresh and directed by Om Sai Prakash. It features Ramkumar and Shruti in the lead roles. The supporting cast includes Jayamala, Sudharani, Prema, Anu Prabhakar, Vijayalakshmi, Radhika Kumaraswamy, Dhamini, Ruthika and Ruchitha Prasad. The score and soundtrack for the film is by Hamsalekha.

== Plot ==
In Bengaluru, Vishnu & Saubhagya are a devout couple, who wish for a child. They make a vow to visit the Navashakti Temples (nine temples dedicated to goddess Adi Parashakti in Karnataka) to obtain offspring. Soon, they have 2 children, Prasad & Devi. The snake goddess Nagadevi teaches the children music and dance and with the money made from the children's performances, Vishnu and Saubhagya also become rich & arrogant, forgetting their vow. Their jealous relatives try to kill Devi and Prasad to illegally obtain all of Vishnu's wealth, but one pair of relatives is supportive of Vishnu and his family. Though the children survive, they lose their ability to speak, & become very weak. The couple is then reminded of their long-forgotten vow, & they resolve to complete it. The jealous relatives insist on accompanying them. Vishnu and Saubhagya decide to take the fire of the nine temples home in nine lamps.

First, they begin by visiting the Chamundeshwari Temple in Mysuru. Since the temple is on the Chamundi Hills, Vishnu and Saubhagya make a vow that if they manage to carry Devi and Prasad and climb the long staircase to the top, their wishes will be fulfilled. The relatives arrive by palanquin, laughing at the couple all the while. The merciful goddess Chamundeshwari arrives as a little girl and blesses the couple by making Devi and Prasad walk up the stairs, thus reducing Vishnu and Saubhagya's burden. The couple worships the goddess, takes the fire, and lights the first lamp with permission from the girl.

Secondly, they visit the Durga Parameshwari Temple in Kateel. While their parents are away at the temple, the relatives, headed by the children's grandmother, the mastermind, give Devi and Prasad, coconut water to drink, Unknown to them, the coconut water was laced with venom. The children fall unconscious and their parents are horrified when they return. They pray to goddess Durga Parameshwari and the goddess appears in the form of a woman and heals the children with Nagadevi's help. After thanking her, the couple then asks her for the fire from one of the lamps at the temple. The goddess agrees and she lights the lamp and gives it to them. While Vishnu circumambulates the temple holding the lamp on his head, the following relatives try to blow the flame out, but the goddess blows them in one breath and sends bees to bite them.

After taking leave of the goddess, the group then travels to the Sharadamba Temple in Sringeri. While Vishnu, Saubhagya, and the children go to the temple, the tired relatives sit down under a tree. They ask Devi and Prasad to play some music, but they don't know how to play an instrument. They try, but the relatives insult their music. A woman appears with a sarangi, questions the relatives, and then plays melodious music. The couple returns and Vishnu wonders who the woman is since she plays soothing music. He thinks that the woman is goddess Sharadamba herself. Sharadamba casts a spell on the relatives that make them inadvertently reveal the truth about themselves. He then propitiates her and she blesses him and his family while also lighting the third lamp for them.

Next to visit is the Marikamba Temple in Sirsi. In the night, when the four are sleeping, the relatives kidnap the sleeping Prasad and Devi, put them in a palanquin, and let them loose on the river. Vishnu and Saubhagya look for them everywhere and approach their relatives at the river bank. They claim to have not seen them. Goddess Marikamba arrives in the form of an aged lady on a coracle and tells them that some valuables are there in the palanquin. Vishnu and Saubhagya open it and are shocked to find their children inside. They thank the lady and return home happily. Before leaving the next morning, they light the fourth lamp.

They then travel to Horanadu to visit the Annapoorneshwari Temple. The relatives insult the children while eating the prasada, which makes the children leave hungry. Instead of eating the prasadam, the relatives go to a restaurant and eat their fill. When they return, their stomachs start aching because of the goddess' magic and they run helter-skelter. The goddess as a woman appears with a bowl of food and gives it to them. Their stomachs heal. At the same time, Vishnu, Saubhagya, and the children are desperately in need of food. The merciful goddess appears in disguise and feeds them the prasad. Vishnu sees that the woman is none other than goddess Annapurneshwari herself. Vishnu sings in praise of Annapurneshwari. She blesses him and lights the lamp for him.

While visiting the Renuka Yellamma Temple in Saundatti and the Banashankari Temple in Badami, the relatives' attempts at killing the children and grabbing the wealth go futile. When Vishnu and his family are outside, the relatives try to blow away the lamps by sitting on them, but they get burnt badly. While in Gokarna, the relatives hatch a plan to get the wealth by choking the grandmother to death and then arranging the funeral, since an immediate death in the family will render the vow useless. The procession ends up at the Bhadrakali Temple. The goddess Bhadrakali arrives in the form of a tantrik and loudly asks the procession why they have arrived here. When they tell her the reason, she says the old lady is not dead. She shouts at the corpse and it wakes up alive. Then she explains the history and the importance of the temple, saying it was built to ensure the protection of the place. Vishnu and his family also get the lamps lit.

All throughout the journey, the jealous relatives try to kill the children & disrupt the pilgrimage, but each time, their efforts are thwarted by the goddesses. Finally, at Kollur, they resort to black magic. Meanwhile, Vishnu is at the Mookambika Temple, worshipping the goddess. Prasad and Devi plan to hold a dance performance, but as they are practising, the sorcerer chokes them. Saubhagya, horrifyingly watching them, prays to goddess Mookambika to save her children. Mookambika appears in the form of a woman and heals them. She then tells Saubhagya that the children are destined to become great people in the future. The other goddesses also appear to watch the performance and get the kids dressed up in their costumes. As the performance begins, the sorcerer chokes them again to the brink of death. Vishnu and Saubhagya pray to the nine goddesses and the eight goddesses merge into Mookambika & kill the sorcerer & relatives, by burning them. Mookambika resurrects the children and restores their voices. The children complete the performance, followed by a loud applause from the audience. The nine goddesses bless Vishnu, Saubhagya, Devi, and Prasad as the film ends. The family then returns to Bengaluru.

== Cast ==
- Ramkumar as Vishnu
- Shruti as Saubhagya
- Master Ramprasad as Prasad, Vishnu and Saubhagya's son
- Kumari Arpitha as Devi, Vishnu and Saubhagya's daughter
- Jayamala as Mookambika
- Sudharani as Sharadamba
- Prema as Chamundeshwari
- Anu Prabhakar as Annapurneshwari
- Vijayalakshmi as Banashankari
- Ruthika as Bhadrakali
- Radhika Kumaraswamy as Durga Parameshwari
- Dhamini as Renukadevi aka Yellamma
- Ruchitha Prasad as Marikamba
- M N Lakshmidevi as the evil grandmother
- Nagashekar
- Bank Janardhan
- Shobhraj
- Soundarya as Renukadevi (cameo appearance using archive footage)

== Production ==
The film was launched on 6 September 2003 at Kanteerava Studios. Actress Soundarya, was initially cast to play the role of goddess Renukadevi, but her death in a plane crash in 2004, left the crew with a predicament, so actress Dhamini was cast in Soundarya's role, with Soundarya's scenes taken from her movie Sri Renukadevi, which was released 1 year before her death.

== Soundtrack ==
Navashakthi Vaibhava

Soundtrack album by Hamsalekha
- Genre: Feature film soundtrack
- Language: Kannada
- Label: UCA Audio
- Producer: Suresh Kumar M Jain

The film's background score and the soundtracks are composed, written by Hamsalekha. The music rights were acquired by UCA Audio.

All lyrics are written by Hamsalekha.

Tracklist
No.	Title	Singer(s)	Length
1.	"Swara Samrajya"	Archana Udupa, Nanditha
2.	"Yaare Akka Bangalore Kayoru"	Gangothri
3.	"Yaare Akka Bangalore Kayoru"	Nandini Hamsalekha
4.	"Jabali Rushi Hrudaya"	Chethan Sosca, Shamitha Malnad, Nanditha
5.	"Amma Endare Anna Needuthale"	Rajesh Krishnan
6.	"Elli Kande"	Fayaz Khan
7.	"Nanna Magu Ninna"	Anoop, Latha Hamsalekha
8.	"Alegala Shilegala"	Chethan Sosca, Shamitha Malnad
9.	"Navashakthi Vaibhava"	Manjula Gururaj, Sangeetha Katti

== Reception ==
A critic from Sify wrote that "The only beauty of this film is that the audiences can watch the nine popular goddesses".
