= Pattinapakkam (film) =

- Film poster
- Directed by: Jayadev
- Written by: Jayadev
- Produced by: Rohit Roy Mulamoottil
- Starring: Kalaiyarasan; Anaswara Kumar
- Cinematography: Raana
- Edited by: Athul Vijay
- Music by: Ishaan Dev
- Production company: Mulamoottil Productions
- Distributed by: Sony Pictures Entertainment
- Release date: 23 November 2018
- Running time: 134 minutes
- Country: India
- Language: Tamil

Pattinapakkam (transl. Starvation) is a 2018 Indian Tamil-language thriller film written and directed by Jayadev. The film stars Kalaiyarasan and Anaswara Kumar in the leading roles, with Chaya Singh, Manoj K. Jayan, Yog Japee, John Vijay, M. S. Bhaskar, and Charle in supporting roles. Featuring music composed by Ishaan Dev, the film which began production in 2015 which was met with a couple of unexpected delays, finally managed to release in theatres on 23 November 2018. by Sony Pictures India. The film is the remake of Malayalam movie Ee Adutha Kalathu

== Synopsis ==
At the busy city of Chennai, Vetri is from a poor family. He is a graduate in electrical engineering but does not wish to take up a regular job, believing that it will not help him make big money in a short time. He becomes a target of powerful people, including the newly appointed city police commissioner DC Sathyaseelan and the local loan shark Samuthiram, when his plans go terribly wrong. His actions, which were supposed to go unnoticed, affects others like Sheeba Thomas, James Thomas, and many others in ways unimaginable. What follows is an unfortunate chain of events in the city.

== Cast ==
- Kalaiyarasan as Vetri
- Anaswara Kumar as Mithra
- Chaya Singh as Sheeba Thomas
- Manoj K. Jayan as James Thomas
- Yog Japee as DC Sathyaseelan
- John Vijay as Samuthiram
- M. S. Bhaskar as Thee Thangavel
- R. Sundarrajan as Minister
- Charle as Bhai
- Rosin Jolly as Malini
- Madhan Bob as Psychologist
- Jangiri Madhumitha as Nithya, servant
- Swaminathan as Iyer, house owner
- Rajesh Ranga as Velraj
- Aditi Ravi as Priya
- Dilsha as Paravi
- Arputhan Vijay as Vijay
- Kiran as Gopi
- Rekha Suresh as Meenakshi

== Production ==
Jayadev aka Jaiiddev, the brother of actress Bhavana, began scripting for the film in mid-2013 and met industry professionals in both Chennai and Kerala to develop his script. After spending over a year meeting potential actors and producers, Jayadev met Kalaiyarasan in Chennai during August 2014 to discuss the film and after hearing the concept and storyline, Kalaiyarasan showed interest to work in the project. Rohit Roy Mulamoottil agreed to produce the film and pre-production began in May 2015, with the team fixing the filming dates for August 2015.

Anaswara Kumar was signed on to play the lead female role. Speaking about her role, Anaswara revealed that she would portray a college student who hails from a middle-class background, who is extremely protective of Vetri (played by Kalaiyarasan)". Chaya Singh revealed that she would be portraying a Bollywood actress, while Kalaiyarasan would play her mother's carer.

However the film later was delayed twice, firstly as a result of Kalaiyarasan signing on to appear in Kabali and then as a result of the 2015 South Indian floods. Principal photography began on 15 December 2015 and after a schedule break, the second schedule started in February and the production was wrapped up in March 2016. The film was shot entirely in and around the city of Chennai. Editing was done by Athul Vijay and post production works were later completed by August 2016, with sound mixing completed at Prasad Studios by Audiographer Krishnamoorthy and grading was done at Prism and Pixels by Nandhakumar.

== Music ==
The songs and BGM are composed by Ishaan Dev and Lyrics by Murugan Manthiram & Velmurugan.

- "Chennai Enga Ooru" – Ishaan Dev
- "Anbe Endhan" – Adheef, Akhila Anand
- "Adra Dolakku" – Anthony Daasan, Jassie Gift
- "Neramthaan Vandhathe" – Abhay Jodhpurkar

== Critical reception ==
The film received negative reviews from critics. Cinema Express wrote "The film tries to be a lot of things at the same time. It starts off as a murder mystery and quickly slips into the family-drama genre, while trying hard to be a comedy intermittently. This lack of clarity in the writing and the sloppy execution makes Pattinapakkam a hard film to sit through." Times of India wrote "With hardly any convincing sequence, the whole set up looks staged and amateurish to the core. We do not sympathise with any of the characters which seem to suffer on screen and there is no curiosity factor throughout the movie."
