= Komal Kumar =

Indian actor (born 1973)

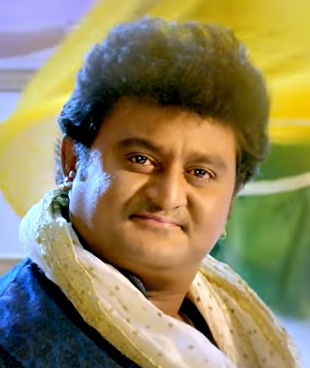
- Born: Komal Kumar Shivalingappa; 4 July 1973 (age 53); Mayasandra, Tumkur, Mysore State (now Karnataka), India
- Occupations: Actor; film producer
- Years active: 1992–present
- Spouse: Anasooya (m. 1993)
- Relatives: Jaggesh (brother)

Komal Kumar Shivalingappa (born 4 July 1973), known mononymously as Komal, is an Indian actor and film producer known for his work in Kannada cinema. He made his acting debut with Super Nan Maga in 1992. Since his debut, Komal has acted in over 100 films, initially in comedic roles as a supporting actor before playing lead roles. He is the younger brother of actor Jaggesh, with whom he has frequently collaborated professionally.

Komal has won Karnataka State Film Award for Best Supporting Actor for the film Thavarige Baa Thangi in 2003 and won the South Filmfare Award for his performance in Neenello Naanalle in 2006.

== Early life and family ==
Komal was born into a well-to-do family of industrialists. He completed his studies in Ooty and was interested in taking up the civil service examinations before he lost interest in academics. He subsequently wanted to pursue a course in cinematography at the Film and Television Institute in Pune, but was unable to do so "owing to my academic background in arts." He then took to acting "doing small roles". His brother, Jaggesh, is an established actor in Kannada cinema. Komal's nephews Gururaj and Yathiraj are also actors. His wife Anasooya is a producer who has produced the film Kal Manja. The couple released the film under their home banner Soundarya Lahari Combines.

== Career ==
Komal made his film debut playing a supporting role in his brother's 1992 film Super Nanna Maga. In Military Mava (1993), he was cast in a lead role under the stage name of Chiranjeevi. In an interview to Deccan Herald in 2003, he recalled, "Unfortunately, the [latter] film flopped miserably, and I lost interest in acting. But my brother kept encouraging me to take up more acting assignments. He would always advice me not to give up." He added, "My role of a villain in Soma (1996) against my brother Jaggesh and Subhashri, who is Malashri's sister, was appreciated so much by Malashri that she cast me for her brother's role in her next movie Lady Commissioner." After a string of other films that he acted in failed to do well or failed to fetch him recognition, it was in Thavarige Baa Thangi (2002) that he received appreciation for his performance. He was subsequently cast in Katthegalu Saar Katthegalu (2003).

Komal returned to playing a lead role with Mr. Garagasa (2008). However he got a break as a lead actor in the 2009 released Chamkaisi Chindi Udaysi produced by his brother-in-law and his wife. Since then he acted as a solo hero in films such as Maryade Ramanna and Kal Manja.

His 2012 film Govindaya Namaha has been declared a blockbuster, catapulting him to stardom status. The song "Pyarge Aagbittaite" featuring Parul Yadav and himself went viral on the internet. After a string of commercial failures, Komal starred in the horror–comedy Namo Bhootatma (2014), a performance that was received well by critics. Shyam Prasad S. of Bangalore Mirror felt that "Komal does his job well" and that "[t]here are no histrionics with everything cut to the point." Prior to the film's release, Komal had stated that he would quit Kannada films if it failed commercially. After being typecast as an actor who could only play comedic roles, Komal starred in the cop film Kempegowda 2 (2019), the eponymous role that he shed 26 kilograms (57 lb) to play.

After a few years of no releases, Komal appeared in the comedy film Undenama (2023). He played the role of an engineer Venkatesh whose only aim in life was to get married and thereby get the license to have sex, something he had been obsessed with since childhood. The film was not received well by critics who called it "jaded". In the horror-comedy Namo Bhootatma 2 as Arjun, a prankster and owner of a local television channel, that gets into trouble after he pranks a couple of gangsters. The film received mixed reviews from critics. Shashiprasad S. M. of the South First called him "the only saving grace" of the film, while The New Indian Express wrote, "Komal Kumar's comedic timing acts as a lifeline, serving as the saving grace that ties together the mishmash of gags. His comic brilliance keeps you engaged, often reminiscent of his brother Jaggesh's expressions."

== Filmography ==
- All films are in Kannada, unless otherwise noted.

Year	Film	Role	Notes
1992	Super Nanna Maga	Vishnu	
1993	Shivanna		
1993	Military Mava		Credited as S. Chiranjeevi
1994	Prema Simhasana		
1994	Beda Krishna Ranginata		
1996	Soma		
1996	Pattanakke Banda Putta		
1996	Shivanna		
1997	Lady Commissioner	Hari	
1999	Drona		
2000	Shukradese		
2000	Khiladi		
2001	Jipuna Nanna Ganda	Abhishek	
2001	Mr. Harishchandra		
2001	Rusthum		
2001	Kurigalu Saar Kurigalu	Ice Candy Gopala	
2002	123	Kotigobba	Partially reshot version
2002	Ninagoskara	Thief	
2002	Hattoora Odeya		
2002	Thavarige Baa Thangi	Nandeesha	Karnataka State Film Award for Best Supporting Actor
2002	Love U		
2002	Makeup	Karate master	
2003	Katthegalu Saar Katthegalu	Komi	
2003	Preetisle Beku		
2003	Kasu Iddone Basu		
2004	Love	Antony	
2004	Maurya	Manu's friend	
2005	Jootata	Eeshwar Khan	
2005	Varsha		
2005	Mr. Bakra	Director	Guest appearance
2005	Gowramma	Bunty	
2005	Sye	Reliance worker	
2005	Love Story		
2006	7 O' Clock	Thief	
2006	Neenello Naanalle	Gunda	Filmfare Award for Best Supporting Actor – Kannada
2006	Mohini 9886788888	Investigating officer	
2006	Chellata		
2006	Shree		
2006	Odahuttidavalu		
2006	Student		
2006	Thandege Thakka Maga		
2006	Honeymoon Express	Rama	
2006	Tenali Rama		
2006	Aishwarya	Bunk Seena	
2006	Dattha	Tingu	
2006	Sevanthi Sevanthi	Malavalli	
2007	Govinda Gopala	Gopala	
2007	Arasu	Daas	
2007	Hudugaata	"Mathi" Madesha	
2007	Tamashegaagi	Shivu	
2007	Sathyavan Savithri		
2007	Cheluvina Chittara		
2007	Manmatha	Marriage broker	
2007	Maathaad Maathaadu Mallige	Gende	
2007	Chanda	College friend	
2008	Gaja	Appaji	
2008	Akasha Gange		
2008	Satya in Love		
2008	Vamshi	Vamshi's sidekick	
2008	Mast Maja Maadi	Mylari	
2008	Meravanige		
2008	Mr. Garagasa	Muniya "Mr. Garagasa"	
2008	Shivani		
2008	Sangama	Kama	
2008	Dheemaku	Komal Kumar alias KK	Cameo
2009	Jaaji Mallige		
2009	Chamkaisi Chindi Udaysi	Bot Seena	
2009	Muniya		
2009	Male Bille		
2009	Mooru Guttu Ondu Sullu Ondu Nija	Siddu	
2010	Appu and Pappu	Animal trainer	
2010	Nannavanu	Thief	
2010	Thipparalli Tharlegalu	Pandu	
2010	Lift Kodla	Ring Road Gowda	
2010	Aptharakshaka	Dr. Srinath	
2010	Yaksha		
2010	Vaare Vah	Adesh Deshpande a.k.a. Adi	
2011	Kal Manja	"Kal" Manja	
2011	Allide Nammane Illi Bande Summane	Himself	Guest appearance
2011	Maryade Ramanna	Ramu	
2012	Govindaya Namaha	Govinda	Nominated—SIIMA Award for Best Comedian
2012	Nandeesha	Nandeesha	
2013	Lakshmi		
2013	CID Eesha		
2013	Veera		
2013	Radhan Ganda	Krishna	
2013	Pyarge Aagbittaite	Sot Somappa Hebbet Mane	
2014	Karoodpathi	Banti Babu	Also singer
2014	Pungi Daasa	Ramadasa	
2014	Aindhaam Thalaimurai Sidha Vaidhiya Sigamani	Dr. Sathish Kumar	Tamil film
2014	Namo Boothatma	Karthik	
2015	Goa	Swamy	
2015	Lodde	Narasimha "Lodde"	
2016	Kathe Chitrakathe Nirdeshana Puttanna	Puttanna	
2016	Deal Raja	"Deal" Raja	
2019	Kempegowda 2	Kempegowda	
2023	Undenama	Venkatesh	
2023	Namo Bhootatma 2	Arjun	
2024	Yala Kunni	K. D. Nagappa / Satya Harishchandra	Dual role
2025	Rajaputhiran	Linga	Tamil film
2025	Kona	Narayana	
2026	Rolex		Filming
2026	Tenali D A. LLB	Tenali	Filming
2026	Sangeetha Bar And Restaurant		Post-Production
2026	Ashokavana		Completed
