= Yaamirukka Bayamey =

2014 Indian film by Deekay

- Theatrical release poster
- Directed by: Deekay
- Written by: Deekay
- Produced by: Elred Kumar; Jayaraman
- Starring: Krishna; Rupa Manjari; Karunakaran; Anaswara Kumar; Oviya
- Cinematography: Rammy
- Edited by: A. Sreekar Prasad
- Music by: S. N. Prasad
- Production company: RS Infotainment
- Release date: 9 May 2014
- Running time: 122 minutes
- Country: India
- Language: Tamil
- Budget: ₹5 crore

Yaamirukka Bayamey (transl. Always fear, when we are here) is a 2014 Indian Tamil-language horror comedy film written and directed by debutant Deekay and produced by Elred Kumar. The cast includes Kreshna, Rupa Manjari, Karunakaran, Anaswara Kumar and Oviya. The film was released on 9 May 2014 to positive reviews.

The film was later remade into Kannada as Namo Bhootatma and in Telugu as Next Nuvve. Yaamirukka Bayamey is based on the 1998 Korean film The Quiet Family.

== Plot ==
Kiran is a TV telemarketer who gets into trouble after one of his products has an opposite effect than what was intended, on the son of a local thug, Durai, and that he acted at the commercial for him. At the same moment, he discovers that his biological father left him a mansion on an estate in a small town through a letter sent to him. He cons Durai's son; escapes with the money along with his girlfriend Smitha; and renovates the rundown mansion into a hotel with the help of a local caretaker named Sharath, who was under the care of Kiran's father before, and his bombshell sister Saranya. Sharath wants to have Saranya marry Kiran for their personal gains, thereby triggering a catfight between Smitha and Saranya. Customers begin to come as soon as the hotel opens. A husband and wife, a newly married Tamil-Chinese couple with relatives, a wrestling coach, and a bodybuilder die on the premise after staying for one night. The dead bodies are buried in the backyard. All the guests die except the schoolkids and teacher who were sent by the local police inspector. Initially, Kiran and Smitha suspect Sharath, but he proves his innocence.

The local digger tips off the police after seeing the four digging in the estate, and Kiran confesses to the police about their deception. However, the police reveals that they died many years ago and that the so-called guests of his hotel were the late owners of the mansion, who died within a few days of purchasing the mansion. His suspicions are confirmed when things start going awry in the house, indicating some supernatural presence after signing the documents for claiming the ownership of the mansion on Kiran's name. They soon go to seek help from brother Adaikalam, who is a cheat. They kidnap him and bring him to the house. The foursome catches an old man inside the house, assuming that he is a thief. However, the old man says that he and the others will die if they leave the hotel. He narrates that the mansion was haunted by a ghost — Mohini, who would kill the house's owner.

Soon, Mohini starts to possess the people in the house and attacks Kiran. The gang is finally cornered with no chance of escape. It is said that they would die by midnight. Hearing someone banging on the door, Kiran opens the door to find Durai, his son, and his thugs. Durai asks for the house in return for the money he conned from him, along with the expense spent for searching him. Feeling pity for them, Kiran warns them about the spirit. Not listening to Kiran, Durai forces him to sign the papers for the house. Kiran and his friends are let go, and they see the spirits of the previous owners going inside the mansion on their way out. Just as they go out, they find the spirits of Durai and his group outside. Knowing that the ghost has killed them since it is midnight, Kiran and his group walk away.

== Cast ==
- Kreshna as Kiran
- Rupa Manjari as Smitha
- Karunakaran as Sharath
- Oviya as Saranya
- Aadhav Kannadasan as Thamizh
  - Nalinikanth as Old Thamizh
- Anaswara Kumar as Mohini
- Mahanadhi Shankar as Don Durai
- Mayilswamy as Adaikalam "Brother"
- Bose Venkat as Arunachalam
- Yogi Babu as Panni Moonji Vaaya
- Namo Narayana as Guest
- Devipriya as Arunachalam's wife
- Balaji as Sitaram
- Vinoth Munna as Doctor
- Devdas Devasahayam as PT Master
- Rail Ravi
- Daniel Annie Pope as Romba Sumar Moonji Kumaru (cameo appearance)
- Sona Heiden as herself

== Production ==
Previously titled as Illa Aanalum Irukku, the film's was retitled to avoid confusion with another film titled Irukku Aana Illai. Filming began in Nainital in October 2013.

== Soundtrack ==
Yaamirukka Bayamey

Soundtrack album by S. N. Prasad
- Released: 2014
- Recorded: 2014
- Genre: Feature film soundtrack
- Length: 16:01
- Language: Tamil
- Label: Sony Music
- Producer: S. N. Prasad

S. N. Prasad chronology
Yaamirukka Bayamey (2014)	Namo Bhootatma (2015)

The soundtrack was composed by S. N. Prasad. All lyrics written by Srikanth Varadan. Prasad received good reviews for his music, for which he gave credit to all his mentors, including the director, producers, and support staff.

Track listing
No.	Title	Singer(s)	Length
1.	"Adaikalam"	Gana Bala, El Fé Choir	3:00
2.	"Ennamo Edho"	Benny Dayal, Sunitha Sarathy	3:39
3.	"Vellai Pandhu"	Haricharan	3:16
4.	"Yemathukkaran"	Harini Padmanabhan	3:26
Total length:			16:01

== Release ==
The film was released on 9 May 2014.

=== Critical reception ===
Udhav Naig of The Hindu called the film "a surprisingly well-made ‘horror-comedy’ that succeeds in continuously exploiting our irrational fear of the unknown even while nudging us to laugh at it...this is a fun summer film and should work regardless of whether one believes in the supernatural or not". Sify wrote, "Yaamirukka Bayamey is something different within the commercial format and provides potent dose of laughs to release the tension built up by the scares". M. Suganth of The Times of India gave it 3 stars out of 5 and wrote, "The horror genre's mandatory elements are all here...but Deekay nicely subverts some of these cliches...Also, he doesn't try to spoof the genre's tropes to elicit laughs but chooses to bring out the humour in other ways. It is this confidence that makes the film work". S. Saraswathi of Rediff.com gave 2.5 stars out of 5 and wrote, "A clever script, good all round performances along with excellent support from the technical team make Deekay’s Yaamirukka Bayamey definitely worth a watch". Nandita Ravi of Deccan Chronicle wrote, "Some cheap thrills, enough screams, a whole lot of clichés with some laughs thrown in for good measure. With all the right elements in place, Yaamirukka Bayamey delivers what is expected of it".

=== Box office ===
In its opening weekend the film grossed approximately ₹2.42 crore from 262 screens in Tamil Nadu. Due to positive reviews and word of mouth the collections picked up and by the end of first week the film had grossed around ₹2 crore.

== See also ==
- List of ghost films
