= Anaswara Kumar =

Indian actress

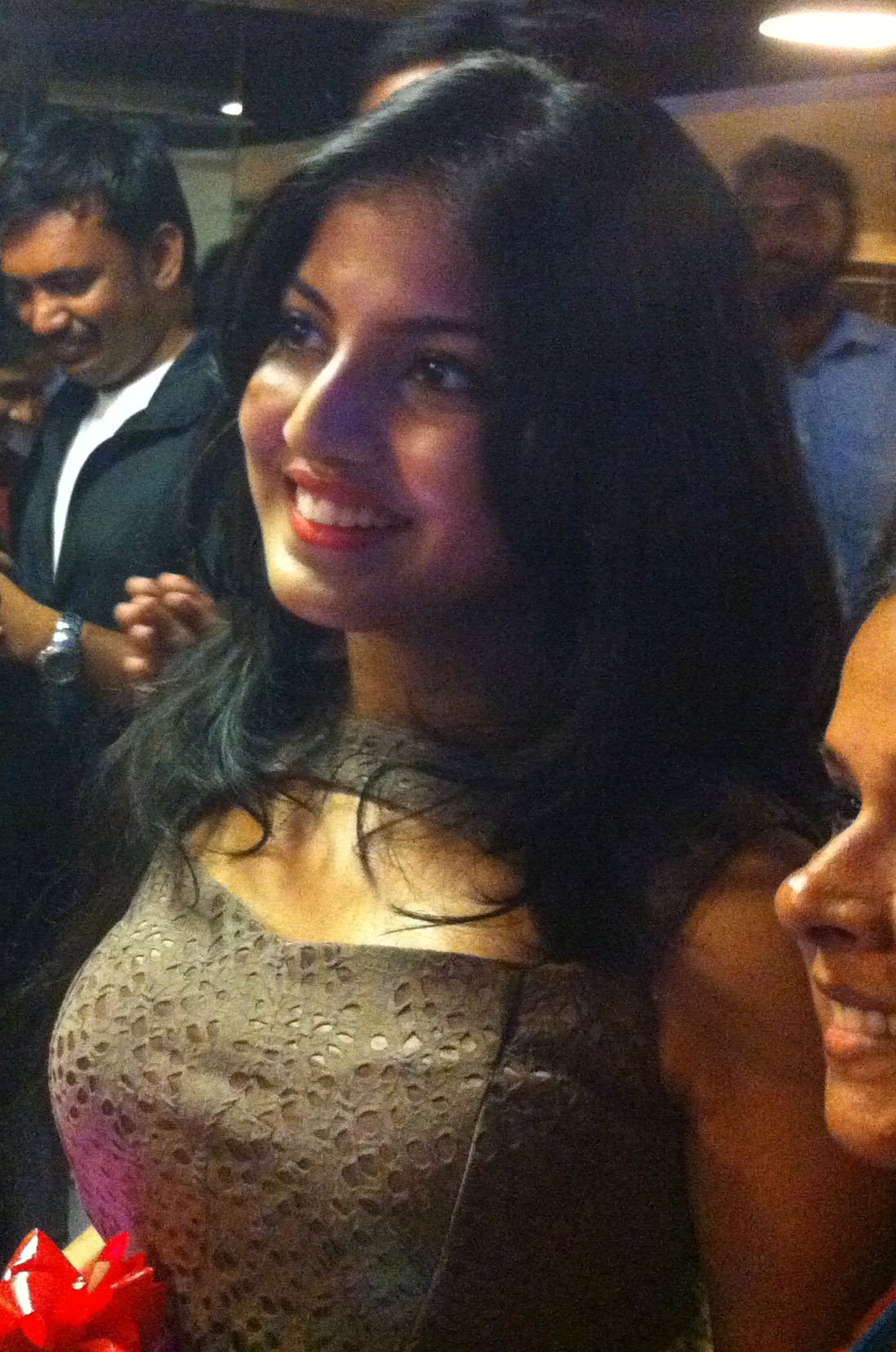
- Kumar in 2014
- Born: Anaswara Kumar; Chennai, Tamil Nadu, India
- Education: Women's Christian College, Chennai
- Occupations: Actress, Model
- Years active: 2011- present
- Spouse: Aditya Nayar (m. 2019)

Anaswara Kumar is an Indian actress and model, who works in the Tamil film industry. She started her career with Arivazhaghan's sports thriller Vallinam (2014), though the romantic comedy Ego (2013) released first. She made her breakthrough portraying Mohini in the black comedy film Yaamirukka Bayamey, which became a commercial success.

== Early life ==
Anaswara was born to Malayali parents in Chennai, Tamil Nadu.

== Career ==
Anaswara started her career in a supporting role for Arivazhaghan's sports thriller Vallinam (2014). She was selected from forty girls in an audition, which she had attended after being spotted at a Chennai Super Kings fans video shoot. Her first leading role came through the romantic comedy Ego (2013) featuring newcomers. The film went on to become an average grosser at the box office and had a low profile release.

She made a breakthrough in her career by portraying the character Mohini, in the black comedy film Yaamirukka Bayamey (2014), which went on to become such a grand commercial success that horror comedy/dark comedy became a trend in the Tamil Film Industry. Anaswara had to audition for the role of Mohini, where her capabilities at portraying the haunted character and creative inputs convinced the Film's Director Deekay to cast her. During production, Anaswara's make-up in the ghost avatar took up to four hours to apply, while she revealed that she got into character by "standing alone in the haunted room to imbibe the ghostly feelings". Lalitha Raj, the makeup artist of Yaamirukka Bayamey appreciated Anaswara saying "For Anaswara, we had to apply heavy makeup and it took about three to four hours to complete it every day . Her dedication should be appreciated. It was cold while shooting for her scenes, but she managed to sit outside with that look for hours." The actors in the film won positive reviews, with Rediff.com noting "the lead actors have performed admirably; there is a touch of eccentricity and wackiness to all the characters that adds to the ambience of the film." She then went on to reprise her role in Yaamirukka Bayamey's Kannada remake Namo Bhootatma (2014), which also became a commercial success.

Anaswara began shooting for a new film in January 2016 titled as Pattinapakkam directed by Jayadev opposite Kalaiyarasan in the lead. Speaking about her role in an interview with Deccan Chronicle Chennai, Anaswara says, "I play the role of Mithra, a college student who hails from a middle-class background. She is loving, caring and is extremely protective of Vetri (played by Kalaiyarasan). She drives Vetri to be more responsible in life."

== Filmography ==
- All films are in Tamil, unless otherwise noted.

Year	Film	Role	Notes
2013	Ego	Gomathi	Debut film
2014	Vallinam	Anu	
2014	Yaamirukka Bayamey	Mohini	
2014	Namo Bhootatma	Mohini	Kannada film
2018	Pattinapakkam	Mithra	
