= Soma (1996 film) =

1996 film directed by Y. Yesudas

- Directed by: Y. Yesudas
- Written by: R. K. Film Creations; Y. Yesudas; Sainath; Kotiganahalli Ramaiah
- Produced by: H. Ramamurthy
- Starring: Jaggesh; Shubhashree; Chi. Guru Dutt
- Music by: Sadhu Kokila
- Release date: 1996
- Running time: 149 minutes
- Country: India
- Language: Kannada

Soma is a 1996 Indian Kannada-language action crime film written and produced by R. K. Film Creations, directed by Y. Yesudas. Jaggesh plays the protagonist opposite Shubhashree while Chi. Guru Dutt portrayed the main antagonist. . It is loosely based on the 1995 Tamil movie Baashha which itself was based on the 1991 Hindi movie Hum. Surprisingly, Baashha went on to be officially remade in Kannada five years later as Kotigobba (2001).

The film revolves around Soma, a timid and peace loving coolie, who lives with his younger sister. However, a brawl at a temple during his sister's marriage causes him to reveal his horrible past to her.

== Cast ==
- Jaggesh
- Shubhashree
- Chi. Guru Dutt
- Shobaraj
- Bank Janardhan
- Gurukiran
- Biradar
- Sundar Raj
- Sathyajith
- M. S. Karanth
- Komal

== Music ==
Soma

Soundtrack album by Sadhu Kokila
- Released: 8 August 1997
- Recorded: 1996
- Genre: Feature film soundtrack
- Length: 19
- Language: Kannada
- Label: Swasthik Audio

The soundtrack album comprises 4 songs composed by Sadhu Kokila. K. Kalyan wrote the lyrics.

- "Ee Kannada Mannina Makkalu Naavamma" — Manu
- "Tharegala Thare" — Manjula Gururaj, Manu
- "Haadalu Nodalu" — Manu
- "Lalugu Lalugu" — Manjula Gururaj, Manu
