= Namo Bhootatma 2 =

- Theatrical release poster
- Directed by: V. Murali
- Written by: Venkat
- Screenplay by: V. Murali
- Story by: V. Murali
- Produced by: Santosh Shekar; V. Murali
- Starring: Komal Kumar; Lekha Chandra; Govinde Gowda
- Cinematography: Halesh
- Edited by: Amith Jawalkar
- Music by: Arun Andrew
- Production company: MS Golden Pictures
- Release date: 4 August 2023
- Running time: 141 minutes
- Country: India
- Language: Kannada

Namo Bhootatma 2 is a 2023 Indian Kannada-language horror comedy film written and directed by Choreographer V. Murali and starring Komal Kumar, Lekha Chandra and Govinde Gowda. The film is a sequel to Namo Bhootatma (2014).

== Cast ==
- Komal Kumar as Arjun
- Lekha Chandra as Amrutha
- Govinde Gowda as Garuda
- Vaarrun Ravi as Shreyas
- Monica Gowda as Nandini
- Mahantesh Hiremath as Loose Manja
- Raaghu Ramanakoppa as Gopalakrishna
- Mimicry Gopi as Swami

== Soundtrack ==
The music was composed by Arun Andrew.

Track listing
No.	Title	Lyrics	Singer(s)	Length
1.	"Ayyo Ayyo"	Kaviraj	Vijay Prakash	4:56
2.	"Namo Namo Re Boothathma"	Mohan (Bajarangi)	Chethan Naik, Airaa Udupi	2:48
Total length:				7:44

== Reception ==
A critic from The New Indian Express wrote that "While the film may not achieve flawless victory, Komal Kumar’s presence makes it somewhat watchable. So prepare yourself for a visit to a spooky house, but only if you’re seeking laughter from cheesy jokes more than the real scares". A critic from The Times of India wrote that "If you are bored of content-oriented films and looking for something different, which can also induce a good amount of laughter and scare, Namo Bhootatma-2 can be enjoyed in theatres". A critic from Deccan Herald wrote that "The slapstick comedy sometimes evokes laughter but poor taste brings it down. The film begins with a promising premise but fails for want of a gripping narrative". A critic from The South First wrote that "Kannada actor Komal Kumar is the only saving grace in this sequel to his previous hit horror-comedy — Namo Bhoothathma".

A Sharadhaa, writing for New Indian Express, gave a rating of 2 out of 5 stars in her review of 'Namo Bhoothathma 2.' The film, directed by Murali, attempts to blend horror and comedy within the setting of an eerie haunted house. While the movie fulfills the requirement of an unsettling backdrop, it falls short in execution, relying on recycled and distasteful humor that may leave viewers wanting more innovative jokes. Komal Kumar's comedic timing shines, adding some charm to an otherwise lackluster film. Despite its shortcomings, the movie combines humor and supernatural intrigue, with Kumar's presence making it somewhat watchable for those seeking laughter from cheesy jokes more than genuine scares.
