= Shiva Shankar (film) =

- Directed by: Kapuganti Rajendra
- Screenplay by: Satyanand
- Produced by: Mohan Babu
- Starring: Mohan Babu; Soundarya
- Cinematography: V. Jayaram
- Edited by: Gautham Raju
- Music by: Ilaiyaraaja
- Production company: Sree Lakshmi Prasanna Pictures
- Release date: 18 August 2004
- Running time: 139 minutes
- Country: India
- Language: Telugu

Shiva Shankar is a 2004 Indian Telugu-language action drama film starring Mohan Babu and Soundarya. The film is directed by Kapuganti Rajendra, who previously worked under Dasari Narayana Rao and Soundarya's last film in Telugu. Shiva Shankar is inspired by the 2002 Hollywood film Road to Perdition. The film is presented by Mohan Babu's son Manchu Vishnu. This is the posthumous film for Soundarya in Telugu, released after her death.

== Cast ==
- Mohan Babu as Siva Shankar / Sivaji
- Soundarya as Padma
- Natanya Singh
- Raja Murad as Sobhanadri
- Riyaz Khan as Hemadri
- Jaya Prakash Reddy
- Ponnambalam
- Mohan Raj
- Ahuti Prasad as Raheem (a car driver)
- Brahmanandam
- Ali as a hotel owner
- L. B. Sriram
- Venu Madhav
- AVS
- Bandla Ganesh
- Raghunatha Reddy
- Ananth
- Chitti Babu
- G. V. Sudhakar Naidu
- Raghu Babu
- Abhinayashree
- Master Abhinav
- Master Vamsi

== Soundtrack ==
Soundtrack was composed by Ilaiyaraaja. The audio launch was held at Annapurna Studios on 31 July 2004. Several film celebrities attended the event. The song "Endhirayyo" was based on Raja's own Tamil song "Maanguyile" from Karagattakaran.

Track Listing
No.	Title	Singer(s)	Length
1.	"Jabilamma Uguthunnadi"	Shreya Ghoshal, Tippu
2.	"Krishnaa Nuvvu Raaku"	K. S. Chithra, Hariharan
3.	"Nenemi Chethunu"	Malathy Lakshman
4.	"Endhirayyo"	Swarnalatha, Tippu
5.	"Neetimeedhe Kaagithana"	Hariharan

== Reception ==
Jeevi of Idlebrain.com gave the film a rating of two-and-a-half out of five and wrote that "The plus points of the film are performance of Mohan Babu and music by Ilayaraja. The main drawback of the film is old-fashioned narration and taking". A critic from Sify wrote that "Direction by Kapuganti Rajendra is not up to the mark but music by Ilayaraja is melodious and the background score is worth mentioning".
