= Ego (2013 film) =

2013 Tamil film by S. Sakthivel

- Directed by: S. Sakthivel
- Written by: S. Sakthivel; Cable Sankar
- Produced by: V. Periyasamy Ravichandran
- Starring: Velu; Anaswara Kumar; Bala Saravanan
- Cinematography: A. V. Vasanth
- Edited by: M. Bala
- Music by: Kash Villainz; Dhina (score)
- Production company: V. P. Stillz
- Distributed by: Vendhar Movies
- Release date: 6 December 2013
- Running time: 116 minutes
- Country: India
- Language: Tamil

Ego is a 2013 Tamil romantic comedy film directed by S. Sakthivel and produced by V. Periyasamy Ravichandran. The film features debutant Velu and Anaswara Kumar in the lead roles, with Bala Saravanan in a supporting role. Ego was released on 6 December 2013. The film's title is based on the characters Easwaran and Gomathi.

== Cast ==
- Velu as Easwaran
- Anaswara Kumar as Gomathi
- Bala Saravanan as Bala
- Rathnavelu as Andipatti Vellaipandi
- Revathi as Paati
- Devika as Anni
- Nikhita Jain as Padma
- Jack Prabhu as Shanmugapandi
- Lingeswaran as Sandhanapandi
- Elizabeth as Meenakshi
- Pradeep as Kishore
- Sandhya as Abi

== Production ==
Sakthivel planned the project as his second directorial venture after Kandhakottai (2009). Velu, an electrical engineering graduate, was selected to make his acting debut through the film. Anaswara Kumar was approached by Sakthivel via Facebook, before successfully clearing an audition. Bala Saravanan, who garnered acclaim for his role in Kana Kaanum Kaalangal Kalloriyin Kadhai, also played a supporting role in the film. Produced by Singapore-based P. Ravichandran, the film has music by Malaysian artist Kash Villanz and dialogues by Cable Sankar. Dhina composed the background score for the film.

The first schedule of the film was shot in Coimbatore, Pollachi and Udumalpet and the second in Chennai and Hyderabad. The songs were filmed in New Zealand.

== Release ==
Post-release, a critic from Sify.com, noted "contrived and unimaginative, this film is worth a skip", adding that "it is cheerfully dumb and doesn't aspire for anything more than cheap laughs" and that "the film's first half is dreadfully dull, and the second only marginally better." In comparison, the New Indian Express praised some aspects of the film, saying "the film comes with no expectations, and at it’s [sic] best is an average entertainer". The film took a poor opening at the Chennai box office.
