= Namo Bhootatma =

- Directed by: Murali
- Written by: Ma. Chandru
- Produced by: Rs infotainment
- Starring: Komal Kumar; Iswarya Menon; Harish Raj; Anaswara Kumar; Gayathri Iyer
- Cinematography: Dasari Seenu
- Music by: Farhan Roshan; S. N. Prasad
- Production company: R. S. Infotainment Private Ltd.
- Release date: 28 October 2014
- Running time: 156 minutes
- Country: India
- Language: Kannada

Namo Bhootatma is a 2014 Indian Kannada horror comedy film directed by Murali in his debut. The film was a remake of the 2014 Tamil film Yaamirukka Bayamey, which itself was based on the Korean movie The Quiet Family. It stars Komal Kumar, Iswarya Menon, Anaswara Kumar, Gayathri Iyer, and Harish Raj in the lead roles. Telugu comedian Ali made his second Kannada movie with this film. It's also dubbed in Hindi with the same name. A sequel Namo Bhoothathma 2 released in 2023.

== Cast ==
- Komal Kumar as Karthik
- Iswarya Menon as Soumya
- Anaswara Kumar as Mohini
- Gayathri Iyer
- Harish Raj as Sharath alias Bhaskar
- Avinash as Karadi Shivanna
- Vinayak Joshi
- Ali as Brother Ali
- Shobaraj as Police Inspector
- Nalinikanth
- Aadhav Kannadasan
- Nikita Thukral as herself in cameo appearance
- Nurse Jayalakshmi in guest role

== Soundtrack ==
The music was composed by Farhaan Roshan and S. N. Prasad and released by Sony Music India. Prasad, who composed the original film, retained his tunes from it. "Nina Chanda", "Hennu Honnu Mannu" and "Paravasam Paravasam" were reused from "Vellai Pandhu", "Ennamo Edho" and "Adaikalam", respectively. Daler Mehndi sang a song in the film.

Namo Bhootatma

Soundtrack album by Farhan Roshan and S. N. Prasad
- Released: 31 October 2014
- Recorded: 2014
- Genre: Soundtrack
- Length: 17:04
- Label: Sony Music India
- Producer: Farhaan Roshan; S. N. Prasad

Farhan Roshan chronology
Pungi Daasa (2014)	Namo Bhootatma (2014)	Ragini IPS (2014)

S. N. Prasad chronology
Yaamirukka Bayamey (2014)	Namo Bhootatma (2014)	Irandam Kuththu (2020)

Track list
No.	Title	Lyrics	Music	Singer(s)	Length
1.	"Paisa Paisa"	Hrudaya Shiva	Farhaan Roshan	Daler Mehndi	3:25
2.	"Ivalu Posu Koduthalla"	Hrudaya Shiva	Farhaan Roshan	Komal Kumar	3:47
3.	"Nina Chanda"	S. Nagesh Prasanna	S. N. Prasad	Yazin Nizar	3:00
4.	"Hennu Honnu Mannu"	Hrudaya Shiva	S. N. Prasad	Al Rufian, Farhaan Roshan	3:47
5.	"Paravasam Paravasam"	Hrudaya Shiva	S. N. Prasad	Al Rufian, Anitha Karthikeyan	3:05
Total length:					17:04

== Reception ==
=== Critical response ===
Shyam Prasad S from Bangalore Mirror Wrote "Komal does his job well.There are no histrionics with everything cut to the point. But also being the producer seems to have burdened him a bit.Harish Raj never gets stranded in any character. He proves he can do any kind of role". A reviewer of The Hans India Wrote "A pacy movie with good sound effects. Telugu comedian Ali as ghostbuster is perhaps the highlight of the movie. He was last seen in Upendra's Super. Horror with comedy is more experimented in Telugu movies, this attempt in Kannada is commendable. A must watch for all Komal fans".
