= Top Hero =

- Movie Poster
- Directed by: S. V. Krishna Reddy
- Written by: Diwakar Babu (dialogues)
- Screenplay by: S. V. Krishna Reddy
- Story by: S. V. Krishna Reddy
- Produced by: Achanta Gopinath
- Starring: Nandamuri Balakrishna; Soundarya
- Cinematography: Sarath
- Edited by: K. Ram Gopal Reddy
- Music by: S. V. Krishna Reddy
- Production company: Sri Chitra Creations
- Release date: 9 December 1994
- Running time: 140 minutes
- Country: India
- Language: Telugu

Top Hero is a 1994 Telugu-language drama film, produced by Mulpuri Venkatrao and Achanta Gopinath under the Sri Chitra Creations banner and directed by S. V. Krishna Reddy. The film was an average success. It stars Nandamuri Balakrishna, Soundarya and its music was composed by S. V. Krishna Reddy.

== Plot ==
The film begins with a robust Balu who always aids the needy with minimal charges and has a crush on beautiful Chitra. Besides, Madhusudhan Rao, a tycoon, turned insane in an accident. As a result, his benevolent wife Rohini faces troubles with her sly brother Dasu, whom they have jailed. Ergo, to seek vengeance, Dasu clutches all her kids. Firstly, he lures the elder son-in-law Sagar via prostitute Vasantha and weeps at the daughter Raji. Likewise, she intrudes into the home and takes over authority. Dasu's progeny also entices the younger two. Plus, a malign Jalarakshasudu jeopardizes Rohini. During that plight, she walks for Balu to facilitate her and requests him to show up as her elder son, which he does. He has gratitude toward Rohini as she supported his mother's rites in childhood. Now, Balu sets foot into the house when he receives rebuff from the family members but thresholds it with patience.

Here, Balu gets startled viewing Madhusudhan Rao. Considering he is the one who rescued him while a few of the goons attempted to murder him, which is the actual cause of his current state. Anyhow, Rohini states it is an accident. Thereby, Balu discerns she is covering the facts and spots her stopping medication to Madhusudhan Rao to be lunatic and suspects something fishy. Step by step, Balu dissolves household hardships, rectifies the kindred, acquires their affection, and checkmates to Dasu — additionally, he recoups Madhusudhan Rao with adequate treatment, and he, too, accepts Balu as his elder one. At that point, he questions Rohini's underlying reason, and then she divulges the past. Once, Madhusudhan Rao witnesses & picturizes a crime committed by Jalarakshasudu and hides the proof. So, she thinks Madhusudhan Rao is safer if he is insane because Jalarakshasudu slaughters him right after his recovery. As of today, Balu promises Rohini that she will shield her husband from bloodthirst. Being conscious of the current state through Dasu, Jalarakshasudu abducts Madhusudhan Rao to learn the whereabouts of the evidence. At last, Balu ceases the baddies and safeguards Madhusudhan Rao. Finally, the movie ends on a happy note with the marriage of Balu & Chitra.

== Cast ==
- Nandamuri Balakrishna as Balu
- Soundarya as Chitra
- Rohini Hattangadi as Rohini
- Mahesh Anand as Jala Rakshasudu
- Kota Srinivasa Rao as Dasu
- Brahmanandam as S.I. Satya Murthy
- Ali as Akkum Bakkum
- AVS as Madhusudana Rao
- Tanikella Bharani as Gurunatham
- Mallikarjuna Rao as Chitra's father
- Gundu Hanumantha Rao as Constable Gundu
- Kishore Rathi as Doctor
- Vidya Sagar as Sagar
- Sivaji Raja as Ravi
- Sriman as Dasu's son
- Sakshi Ranga Rao as Classical Singer
- Subbaraya Sharma as S.P.
- Jenny as Doctor
- Kinnera as Kinnera
- Rajeswari as Raji
- Archana as Gayatri
- Radha Prashanthi
- Krishnaveni as Vasantha
- Master Baladitya as Aditya
- Aamani as an item number "O Muddu Papa" (Cameo appearance)

== Soundtrack ==
Top Hero

Film score by S. V. Krishna Reddy
- Released: 1994
- Genre: Soundtrack
- Length: 25:06
- Label: Aakash Audio
- Producer: S. V. Krishna Reddy

S. V. Krishna Reddy chronology
Shubhalagnam (1994)	Top Hero (1994)	Ghatotkachudu (1995)

All music is composed by S. V. Krishna Reddy

Track list
No.	Title	Lyrics	Singer(s)	Length
1.	"O Paapa Muddu Paapa"	Jonnavittula Ramalingeswara Rao	S. P. Balasubrahmanyam	4:44
2.	"Samajavaragamana"	Jonnavittula Ramalingeswara Rao	S. P. Balasubrahmanyam, K. S. Chithra	4:58
3.	"Okkasaari Okkasaari"	Sirivennela Seetharama Sastry	S. P. Balasubrahmanyam, K. S. Chithra	5:11
4.	"Jaamurathri"	Jonnavittula Ramalingeswara Rao	S. P. Balasubrahmanyam, K. S. Chithra	4:52
5.	"Oho Bhama"	Jonnavittula Ramalingeswara Rao	S. P. Balasubrahmanyam, K. S. Chithra	4:27
6.	"Beedilu Thagandi"	Sirivennela Seetharama Sastry	S. P. Balasubrahmanyam, K. S. Chithra	4:45
Total length:				28:57

Hindi Version

1. " Duniya Mein Teri" - N/A
2. "Ek Baar Mujhe Bulayegi" - N/A
3. "Lage Jab Se Naina" - N/A
4. "Pyar Ki Dil Mein Aag Lagi Hai" - Kumar Sanu, Kavita Krishnamurthy
5. "Pyari Baby O Pyari Baby" - Kumar Sanu
6. "Smoking Is Injurous To Health" - N/A
