= Sanjana Singh =

Indian actress

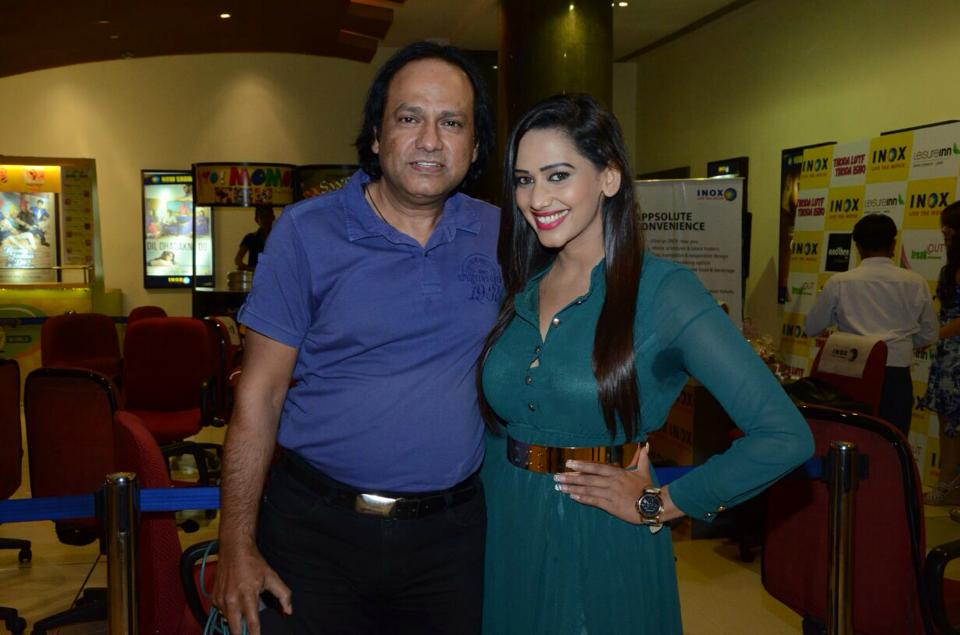
- Sanjana Singh with Suresh Sharma 2015
- Born: Sanjana Singh; Mumbai, India
- Occupation: Film actress
- Years active: 2009–present

Sanjana Singh is Indian actress, who appears in Tamil language films. She made her debut in the 2009 film Renigunta.

== Career ==
She made her debut in the critically acclaimed 2009 film Renigunta, directed by Paneerselvam. A critic from The Hindu noted that "an understated yet powerful performance comes from Sanjana Singh, who plays the role of a sex worker forced into the profession by her husband. Her spontaneity and perfection in lip sync for the Telugu-influenced-Tamil accent shows that here's one Mumbai import, who goes beyond glamour and is worth looking out for." She was next seen as a Telugu woman in a special appearance in the film Ko, featuring alongside several actors in the song "Aga Naga".

In 2012, she has appeared in the films such as Marupadiyum Oru Kadhal and Yaarukku Theriyum.

== Filmography ==
- All films are in Tamil, unless otherwise noted the language.

Year	Film	Role	Notes
2009	Renigunta	Unnamed mute girl's elder sister	
2011	Ko	Telugu woman	Uncredited appearance in “Aga Naga” song
2012	Kadhal Paathai		
2012	Mayanginen Thayanginen		Special appearance
2012	Marupadiyum Oru Kadhal		Special appearance
2012	Yaarukku Theriyum	Mala	Also made in Kannada as Challenge and Malayalam as 120 Minutes
2013	Ragalaipuram	Swetha	
2014	Vetri Selvan		
2014	Anjaan	Sindhu	
2014	Vingyani		
2014	Meaghamann	Rane's wife	
2015	Iravum Pagalum Varum	Hamsa	
2015	Thoda Lutf Thoda Ishq		Hindi film, Special appearance
2015	Thani Oruvan	Ammulu	
2016	Velainu Vandhutta Vellaikaaran		Special appearance
2017	Sakka Podu Podu Raja	Hamsa	
2018	Aaruthra	Avudaiappan's wife	
2021	Kade Haan Kade Naa	Nimmi	Punjabi film
2022	Ramarao on Duty	SP Devanand's girlfriend	Telugu film; Guest appearance
2022	Naai Sekar Returns	Gora	
2022	Gurumoorthi	Saroja	
2023	Raakadhan	Sanjana	
2023	Maujaan Hi Maujaan		Punjabi film
2023	Tik Tok	Prostitute	
2024	Vettaikkari		
2026	Mr. X	Jasleen Kaur	
