= Bengaloored =

- Directed by: Swaroop Kanchi
- Written by: Imran Chaudhary (lyrics); Vasu Dixit (lyrics)
- Produced by: Swaroop Kanchi
- Starring: Harish Raj; Meghana Mudiyam; Srinivasa Prabhu
- Release date: 2 July 2010 (India)
- Country: India
- Language: English

Bengaloored is a 2010 Indian English feature film set in Bangalore, directed by Swaroop Kanchi. The film stars Harish Raj and Meghana Mudiyam.

== Plot ==
Babruahana returns home to Bangalore from France and hopes to author a book. He goes to meet gorgeous Radha, a school-friend, on whom he always had a crush. They meet and continue meeting, and Babruahana hopes to propose to her soon. He then sets about to meet his favorite author, Ramana, as well as his estranged love, Vanamala. He does not look forward to meeting his widowed father, but does so, and finds him remarried to Madhu. He will also find that a six-lane highway is about to be built around his ancestral home, which may be demolished. He also catches up with his friend, Siddharth, who has become a much-revered Sanyasi. As he struggles to adapt to the changes – nothing prepares him for the shocks that await him.

== Cast ==
- Harish Raj ... Babruahana
- Meghana Mudiyam ... Radha
- Srinivas Prabhu ... Ramana
- Lakshmi Chandrashekar ... Vanamala
- R. T. Kumar ... Babruahana's father
- Suma Vinod ... Madhu
- H. V. Prakash ... BBMP Guy
- Swaroop Kanchi ... Siddharth

== Reception ==
A critic from Bollywood Hungama wrote that "Really, this film is made for a very very very niche audience and even for that segment which revels on decoding art house cinema, Bengaloored could be quite an ordeal to sit through in entirety".
