= Undenama =

- Theatrical release poster
- Directed by: K L Rajashekar
- Starring: Komal; Dhanya Balakrishna; Tabla Nani; Harish Raj
- Cinematography: Naveen Kumar S
- Music by: Sridhar V Sambhrama
- Release date: 14 April 2023
- Country: India
- Language: Kannada

Undenama is a 2023 Indian Kannada-language comedy film directed by K L Rajashekar. It stars Komal, Dhanya Balakrishna, Thabla Nani and Harish Raj. It was released theatrically on 14 April 2023.

== Cast ==
- Komal Kumar as Venkatesh a.k.a. Venky
- Dhanya Balakrishna as Preethi
- Tabla Nani as Venkatesh's father
- Harish Raj as Krishna
- KGF Sampath
- Bank Janardhan
- Thanisha Kuppanda
- Vaishnavi
- Apoorva
- Kuri Prathap
- Giri

== Reception ==
=== Critical response ===
Pratibha Joy from OTT Play wrote "Undenaama would have perhaps worked if it had been made a couple of decades ago. The subject is jaded, as are the actors, making it quite lacklustre. The film dropped on Sun NXT on June 2. Watch it only if you can’t find anything better or actually like this kind of cinema". A reviewer of Udayavani says "More attention could have been given to the songs and background music of the movie. Apart from that, the cinematography and editing of the movie make "Undenama" look good". Vinay Lokesh from The Times of India wrote "Undenamma is a typical comedy film with a bit of crime elements that lives up to the billing. Dhanya Balakrishna does her best with limited opportunities. Undenamma is a good one time watch".
