= Dweepa =

2002 Indian film directed by Girish Kasaravalli

- Poster
- Directed by: Girish Kasaravalli
- Screenplay by: Girish Kasaravalli
- Dialogues by: Gajanana Sharma; Girish Kasaravalli; Jayanth Kaikini
- Story by: Na D'Souza
- Based on: Dweepa by Na D'Souza
- Produced by: Soundarya
- Starring: Soundarya; Avinash; M. V. Vasudeva Rao; Harish Raj
- Cinematography: H. M. Ramachandra
- Edited by: M. N. Swamy
- Music by: Isaac Thomas Kottukapally
- Production company: Sathya Movie Makers
- Release dates: 26 September 2002 (IFFI); 27 December 2002
- Running time: 134 minutes
- Country: India
- Language: Kannada

Dweepa (transl. The Island) is a 2002 Indian Kannada-language film by Girish Kasaravalli, based on the novel of the same name by Na D'Souza. It stars Soundarya, Avinash and M. V. Vasudeva Rao in the lead roles. The novel dealt with the raging issue of building dams and the displacement of natives. The film, however, focuses more on the human interaction between characters and the dam and displacement themes become somewhat secondary. It won two National Film Awards, four Karnataka State Film Awards and three Filmfare Awards South.

== Plot ==
Located in the backwaters of a dam, Sita Parvata is a low-lying island gradually submerging due to incessant rain. The government evacuates its residents, offering compensation for their properties. However, the temple priest Duggajja, his son Ganapa and daughter-in-law Nagi find it difficult to abandon their homeland and survive on the meagre compensation. Their small hut earns them just ₹25,000. As Ganapa explains, the money can provide food and shelter, but cannot replace the love and respect they enjoy in their community. On the island, they are respected members of society, whereas elsewhere they would be among hundreds of families struggling to make a living.

Krishna, Nagi's cousin, arrives from Mumbai, where he had previously settled. His carefree, urban outlook contrasts sharply with Ganapa's growing pessimism. With Krishna's help, the family temporarily moves to a house at a higher elevation, protecting them from the rising water. However, Ganapa soon becomes suspicious of the relationship between Nagi and Krishna.

Meanwhile, government officials increase the compensation to Rs. 25,000, but Duggajja refuses to sign the necessary documents. He and Ganapa perform the sacred temple ritual known as "Nema", after which Duggajja sends his son home to spend the night at the temple himself. Determined to seek answers to their troubles, he decides to question the deity. The following morning, Nagi goes to bring her father-in-law home, only to discover that the temple is largely submerged and Duggajja has drowned. Grief-stricken, she and Ganapa perform his last rites.

Nagi's father urges the couple to move to town and establish a new life, but she refuses. Following Duggajja's death, the couple grow distant from Krishna, who becomes increasingly saddened by their behaviour. Ganapa, meanwhile, struggles to overcome his grief. Nagi comforts him and encourages him to regain his confidence.

Concerned by Ganapa's jealousy and insecurity, Nagi asks Krishna to leave. He agrees, but takes their only boat, the family's sole means of travelling to and from Sita Parvata, leaving them marooned. Their situation deteriorates further when a tiger begins roaming around their house and water starts seeping into their new home. While Nagi remains determined and works to keep the house in order, Ganapa loses hope and resigns himself to their fate. As he sleeps in despair, Nagi stays awake throughout the night, protecting their home and their only calf from the tiger.

The following morning, the dam overflows and the water gradually begins to recede. Ganapa thanks God for what he considers a miracle. When Nagi asks whether her efforts throughout the night have made any difference, he dismisses her contribution, describing her as merely a "tool" in God's hands and attributing their survival entirely to divine intervention.

== Cast ==
- Soundarya as Nagi
- Avinash as Ganapa
- M. V. Vasudeva Rao as Duggajja
- Harish Raj as Krishna
- Purushottama Talavata
- Siddaraj Kalyankar
- Malati
- Vijayasarathy
- Radha Ramachandra
- Sringeri Ramanna
- Sawant

== Production ==
=== Development and filming ===
Upon being impressed by Na D'Souza novel Dweepa, Girish Kasaravalli narrated the story to Soundarya who decided to adapt it into a film that she would produce it. Filming began in August 2000 but was temporarily stalled due to events surrounding the abduction of Rajkumar. As heavy rains were intrinsic to the plot of the film, shooting had to be further postponed to the following monsoons due to inadequate rainfall that year in Karnataka. Kasaravalli shuttled up and down to Linganamakki Dam area, and the surrounding villages Bellenne and Taleguppa with his crew, trying to get the rainy days on film. The filming was completed and ready for release in December 2001. With author D'Souza's consent, changes in the plot were made in the adaptation. The human dimension of the interaction between characters was put to the forefront of the story, with the social concern around the plot being made secondary. The film was first screened at the International Film Festival of Kerala in April 2002. Kasaravalli also showed it to the film appreciation course students of the Film and Television Institute of India, Pune, and received good responses from them.

=== Theme and inspiration ===
Kasaravalli said he "read the book and liked the theme very much." He added, "It is all about how people's lives change completely when the land around them gets submerged. It is not just about physical change and survival, but about changes in culture, value systems and even basic self-confidence, caused by circumstances beyond a person's control." Thematically, the film was observed by critics as similar to his previous films, that of "human relationships and struggles". Alienation is another theme in the film that Kasaravalli depicted, like in his previous works, Ghatashraddha (1977) and Mane (1990). The female protagonist in Dweepa had an optimistic outlook on life as opposed to her husband's abject resignation to his fate. Critic Srikanth of Deccan Herald wrote, "As always, Dweepa has a woman protagonist who represents strength, optimism and pragmatism signifying the growth of the today's 'new age woman'. The film celebrates Nagi's inner strength, which is also the beauty of human nature. Through Nagi's characterisation, director Kasaravalli hopes to prove that women are capable of unselfish love and facing life courageously." Barring the main characters, he identifies an outsider and the water as two other characters on the film; represents the world on the other side of the river as opposed to the central character's dwelling, and the latter lending a metaphoric voice to Dweepa." He added, "Rarely have the rains been brought to the foreground as a character. But here, it represents some kind of a hope as well as fear as is visible."

== Reception ==
Srikanth of Deccan Herald felt the film was "quite engaging and briskly paced." He added that the cinematographer H. M. Ramachandra "certainly deserves a lot of credit for capturing the picturesque locales of Malnad in its splendour." He commended the acting performances and wrote, "Soundarya ... has certainly come of age. She has bloomed into a fine actress and a natural performer besides producing the film herself. Kasaravalli has drawn a superb performance from Avinash, who has portrayed his character with panache. The late Vasudeva Rao has put up a spirited performance. Harish Raju comes as a whiff of fresh air in the film. It is an out and out Kasaravalli film with a lot of surprises!"

== Awards and screenings ==
49th National Film Awards

- National Film Award for Best Feature Film – Soundarya (film producer)
- National Film Award for Best Cinematography – H. M. Ramachandra Halkere

2001–02 Karnataka State Film Awards

- Best Film – Soundarya
- Best Direction – Girish Kasaravalli
- Best Actress in a lead role – Soundarya
- Best Cinematography – H. M. Ramachandra Halkere

50th Filmfare Awards South

- Best Film – Soundarya
- Best Direction – Girish Kasaravalli
- Best Actress in a Lead Role – Soundarya

Screenings

- Human Rights Watch International Film Festival, New York
- 33rd International Film Festival of India
- Fukuoka Film Festival, Japan
- Durban International Film Festival
- International Film Festival of Rotterdam
- Cinema Vintage Programme, IsolaCinema, KinoOtok
- Moscow International Film Festival

== Soundtrack ==
Unlike earlier Kasaravalli films, Dweepa had music by Thomas Isaac Kottukapally used throughout.
