= Swaroop Kanchi =

Indian film producer and director

- Born: 29 June 1983 (age 43); Bangalore, Karnataka, India
- Occupations: • Film director • Film producer • Screenwriter
- Website: swaroopkanchi.com

Swaroop Kanchi (born 29 June 1983) is an Indian film director, producer and screenwriter.

Making feature-length English-language – primarily independent films through Tapas Films, based in Bangalore, Karnataka – his films include the romance-drama films Hong Kong Dreaming (2008) and Bengaloored (2010).

== Early life and education ==
He was born in Bangalore, a pre-mature child born at just 6 1/2 months, his father is also an actor who worked in more than 50 films before quitting acting for good. His mother was a businesswoman; however, he showed no inclination towards films at an early age instead choosing to play tennis. He studied in Bangalore before starting off his career as a junior tennis player, moving to chennai after being selected at the prestigious Britannia Amritraj Tennis program. He came back to Bangalore before being forced to quit tennis for personal reasons.

== Career ==
Kanchi, a design student learnt the art of filmmaking by himself. He started off with a few low-budget films which earned him recognition for his creativity, technique, approach and story-telling skills. One of his first films Something Taboo, dealt with misconceptions about sexually transmitted diseases and myths about HIV – one of his first attempts at socially relevant films.

He worked on the film Black Sugar which premiered at the New York Film Festival. Kanchi has also worked on Sleeping with the Enemy's Son, Acid and Taxiwallah, all American independent films made in Los Angeles, California.

Presently based in Bangalore Kanchi has worked on films promoting education for street children with a film for Akanksha. Kanchi also collaborated with DreamWorks Executive to make a film on the similarities and differences between Bollywood and Hollywood; the film featured many notable film personalities of Indian film industry. He has also made a documentary film about the Kumbh Mela a mass Hindu pilgrimage. This was followed by non-fiction film projects based on Indian spirituality and cultural heritage in Cambodia, the Himalayas, India and Thailand.

Hong Kong Dreaming (2008), an English-language film shot in Hong Kong, made with London actress Fiona Man, and Hollywood actor Kai Wong, resulting in the only Indo-Hong Kong film to date. The film premiered at the International Film Festival of England and later at the Bengalooru Film Festival.

In 2008, Kanchi served as the Executive Producer on the short film Supraman and the School of Necessity with UK-based filmmakers. The film's cast were from real slums in Bangalore and stars a young child from an orphanage. It earned international acclaim and was lauded by many internationally acclaimed directors and film personalities. The film brought awareness to the cause of every child's right to basic education.

His film Bengaloored (2010) was set for an all Indian wide release in 2010.

In 2014 Yeh Dil Ramta Jogi Released, his first Hindi film, also his first starring role in a film. The film also co-starred Cajole Kapoor, Rageshwari Mahanta and noted Bollywood actor Sunil Kumar Palwal. The film was followed by Mudita, another Indian English film starring Padmavati Rao, Swaroop Kanchi, Shivani Parmar, Irshikaa Mehrotra, Alistar Bennis and Sudha NarasimhaRaju. The film premiered at the Marche Du film at Cannes Film Festival and finally Released on Amazon Prime Video Worldwide.

Kanchi has been working on a film called Tripura Rahasya a big-budget film to be shot mostly in India.

== Filmography ==
Year	Film	Genre	Credited as		
Year	Film	Genre	Director	Producer	Screenwriter
2008	Hong Kong Dreaming	romance drama	Yes	Yes	Yes
2010	Bengaloored	romance drama	Yes	Yes	Yes
2014	Yeh Dil Ramta Jogi	romance drama	Yes	Yes	Yes
2019	Mudita	Romance, Drama, Musical	Yes		Yes

== See also ==
- List of Indian film directors
- List of Indian writers
- List of film producers
- List of people from Bangalore
- List of people from Mumbai
