= Mr. Garagasa =

- DVD cover
- Directed by: Dinesh Baboo
- Written by: Dinesh Baboo
- Produced by: Srinivasulu Hospet
- Starring: Komal; Anant Nag; Aishwarya; T. S. Nagabharana; Lakshmi Hegde; Sudharani
- Cinematography: Dinesh Baboo
- Edited by: K. Eshwar
- Music by: Manikanth Kadri
- Production company: Sri Sai Productions
- Release date: 12 April 2008
- Country: India
- Language: Kannada
- Box office: ₹55 lakh

Mr. Garagasa (transl. Garrulous person) is a 2008 Indian Kannada-language comedy film written and directed by Dinesh Baboo and starring Komal in a lead role after a gap of fifteen years. The film is based on 1998 French comedy Le Dîner de Cons (also known as The Dinner Game) and its Hindi remake Bheja Fry (2007).

== Plot ==
Muniya wants his movie script to be made into a film, so he comes to Bangalore with the script in his briefcase. He finds Parthasarthy, a film producer, but Muniya has a hard time convincing him that his story is good enough.

== Cast ==
- Komal Kumar as Muniya (Mr Garagasa)
- Anant Nag as Parthasarthy
- Aishwarya as Madhavi
- Lakshmi Hegde as Teju
- T. S. Nagabharana as Sharat
- Sudha Rani as Gouri
- Ramesh Bhat as Dr Karanth
- Vanishri as Mandakini
- Pavitra Lokesh
- Pawan Kumar

== Music ==
The movie contains only one track.

| Song | Lyrics | Singer(s) | Duration |
|---|---|---|---|
| "Naviligu Mugiligu" | Raghu Urdigar | Lakshmi | 03:08 |

== Critical reception ==
Sify wrote: "The whole film leaves an impression of watching a stage play. Concentration is given more for dialogues". R. G. Vijayasarathy of IANS wrote: "Garagasa is a well made film and gives a full meal entertainment of comedy".
