= Challenge (2012 film) =

- Promotional poster
- Directed by: Ganesan Kamaraj
- Written by: Ganesan Kamaraj
- Dialogues by: Shaan (Kannada); Kannan (Tamil)
- Produced by: Shridaran
- Starring: Nishan; Achyuth Kumar; Harish Raj; Sanjana Singh; Dileep Raj; Kalabhavan Mani; Jayaprakash; Riyaz Khan; Dharma
- Cinematography: Mahesh K. Dev
- Edited by: G. Ramarao
- Music by: Kannan
- Production company: Arubere Art Ventura Private Limited
- Release dates: 7 August 2012 (Kannada); 2 November 2012 (Tamil); 3 March 2013 (Malayalam)
- Country: India
- Languages: Kannada; Tamil; Malayalam

Challenge is a 2012 Indian film directed by Kamaraj. The film stars Nishan, Sanjana Singh, Achyuth Kumar, Harish Raj, Sanjana Singh, Kalabhavan Mani, Jayaprakash, Riyaz Khan and Dharma. This film was simultaneously shot in Kannada, Tamil, and Malayalam; Challenge is the title of the Kannada version, whereas the Tamil and Malayalam versions are titled Yaarukku Theriyum (transl. Who knows?) and 120 Minutes, respectively. The film is an adaptation of Unknown (2006).

== Cast ==
- Nishan as Shakthi
- Achyuth Kumar as Soori
- Harish Raj as Baasha
- Sanjana Singh as Mala, Baasha's wife
- Dileep Raj as Kishore
- Kalabhavan Mani as Balaji
- Jayaprakash as Vishwanath
- Riyaz Khan as V. Gulothungan
- Dharma as Narayan
- Biradar (Kannada) / Kovai Senthil (Tamil) / Sadiq (Malayalam) as Coconut seller
- Siva Narayana Murthy as Baasha's phone call recipient (Tamil)

== Production ==
The film's director previously worked as an assistant director for Ghajini (2005). Sanjana Singh, who starred in Renigunta (2009) was signed to play the love interest of Harish Raj. Kannada actor Harish Raj dubbed for himself in the Tamil version. The Malayalam version featured different characterisations than the other two versions.

== Soundtrack ==
The soundtrack consists of two songs composed by Kannan.

Kannada version

Lyrics by Chi Dattaraj and V. Nagendra Prasad.

- Challenge Beku
- Enne Kudi

Tamil version

- Yaaruku Theriyum - lyrics by Yugabharathi and sung by Haricharan
- Nandu Chicken – lyrics by Vaali and sung by Mukesh

Malayalam version

Lyrics by Aziz.

== Reception ==
The Kannada and Tamil versions released to polarized reviews.

=== Challenge ===
Sify stated that "The film takes a slow start but picks up later with the narrative becoming interesting and it continues to engage you till the climax". The Times of India opined that "While Dharma shines as a police officer, Harish Raj, Dilip Raj and Achuth Kumar have done justice to their roles. Sanjana Singh has little to do. Cinematography by Mahesh K Dev is impressive".

Conversely, The New Indian Express stated that "But, director Kamaraj who had an intelligent subject at hand has lost points in his presentation and could not transcend it whole-heartedly on to the screen". Bangalore Mirror wrote that "Challenge should rank high among the films of Achyuth Kumar for his brilliant performance. Harish Raj, Dilip Raj and Kalabhavana Mani are also apt for their roles. The camera work is dull and the songs uninspiring".

=== Yaarukku Theriyum ===
The Times of India gave the film three out of five stars wrote that "Yaarukku Theriyum is a rare movie that has brought together smaller names from the south Indian film industry". The Times of India also praised the performances of Achyuth Kumar and Harish Raj saying that "Kannada actors Achyuth Kumar and Harish Raj, as humourous [sic] Baasha, come out on top with their performances".

On the contrary, News18 opined that "Despite an engaging plot, the film struggles to keep you hooked and eventually graduates as one sans any thrills". News 18 also criticized the use of English dialogue in the film. The New Indian Express criticized the film and wrote that "But the characters are too many, and the numerous sub-plots linking them at times seem contrived". Behindwoods wrote that "Director Ganesan Kamaraj seems to have focused his intentions on getting the audience to play the guessing game but disappointment looms as the surprises turn out to be far from clever". DNA India opined that "Yaarukku Theriyum engages partly, but disappoints extremely".
