= Harish Raj =

Indian actor and director

- Born: Bangalore, Karnataka, India
- Other names: Hareesh Raj; Harish Raju
- Occupations: Actor, Director, Producer
- Years active: 1996–present
- Spouse: Shruthi Lokesh (m. 2014)

Harish Raj is an Indian actor and director based in Kannada cinema. He made his acting debut in the television serial Hosa Chiguru Hale Beru in 1996 and his debut in feature films was with Doni Saagali in 1998. After featuring in a string of films and serials, Raj moved into film direction with Kalaakaar (2009). He also acted in several Malayalam and Tamil films and Hindi television serials. He also performed in television commercials.

He is best known as an actor in critically acclaimed films such as Dweepa, Koormavatara, Thaayi Saheba, and Kaanuru Heggadathi.

== Personal life ==
Harish Raj was born and raised in Bangalore, Karnataka, India. He completed his M.A in English from Karnataka State Open University. He married a Lingayat, Shruthi Lokesh in 2014, and together they have two daughters.

== Filmography ==
=== Kannada films ===
Year	Film	Role	Notes
1997	Thaayi Saheba		
1998	Doni Sagali		
1998	Shanti Shanti Shanti	Mechanic	Uncredited role
1999	Kanooru Heggadithi		
2000	Bhoogatha Dore		
2001	Kurigalu Saar Kurigalu		
2002	Dweepa	Krishna	
2002	Thuntata		
2003	Wrong Number		
2003	Mouni		
2003	Neenandre Ishta	Vishwa	
2004	Bhagath		
2005	Hendathi Obbalu Maneyolagiddare		
2005	Shadyantra		
2005	Geeya Geeya		
2006	Nanna Kanasine Hoove		
2006	Tananam Tananam		
2006	Nage Habba		
2007	Ninade Nenapu	Raj	
2008	Banada Neralu		
2008	Anthu Inthu Preethi Banthu	Hari	
2008	Bandhu Balaga	K. Raghunandan	
2008	Honganasu		
2008	Beladingalagi Baa		
2008	Ninnusire Nannusiru		
2009	Love Guru		
2009	Kalaakaar		Also director
2010	Sugreeva		
2010	Antharathma		
2011	Gun	Ganesh	Also director
2011	Aidondla Aidu		
2012	Govindaya Namaha	Harsha	
2012	Sri Kshetra Adi Chunchanagiri	Narada Muni	
2012	Challenge	Baasha	Trilingual film in Kannada, Malayalam, and Tamil
2013	Barfi	Balu	
2013	Ambara		
2013	Koormavatara	Nathuram Godse	
2013	Jinke Mari		
2014	Power	Shastri	
2014	Namo Boothatma	Sharath alias Bhaskar	
2014	Jai Lalitha	Yogi	
2016	Siganduru Chowdeshwari Mahime		
2016	Sri Satyanarayana		Also director Limca Record for essaying 16 roles in a single film
2018	Orange	Prashanth	
2019	Kiladi Police		Also director
2021	Ramarjuna	Dr. Hariprasad	
2023	Undenama	Krishna	
2024	Pretha	Dr. Surya	Also director

=== Other language films ===
Year	Film	Role	Language	Notes
2010	Bengaloored	Babruahana	English	
2012	Yaarukku Theriyum	Baasha	Tamil	
2013	Omega.exe		Malayalam	
2014	120 Minutes	Baasha	Malayalam	
2017	Kaatru Veliyidai	Madhusoodhanan Pillai	Tamil	
2018	B.Tech	DCP Ramkumar Naik	Malayalam	
2019	Irupathiyonnaam Noottaandu	DYSP Xavier	Malayalam	
2021	Erida	Inspector Sundar	Malayalam	Bilingual film
2021	Erida	Inspector Sundar	Tamil	Bilingual film
2022	CBI 5	Sam	Malayalam	

== TV serials ==
Title	Language
Maneondhu Moorubagilu	Kannada
Kuberappa and Sons	Kannada
Swathimuthu	Kannada
Kavyanjali	Kannada
Mooka Raaga	Kannada
Premakathegalu	Kannada
Minchina Balli	Kannada
Danda Pindagalu	Kannada
Athma	Kannada
Prathibimba	Kannada
Chakra	Kannada
One Tea Spoon Suspense	Kannada
Bhagyalakshmi	Kannada
Veera Sipayee	Hindi
Antharal	Hindi
Swarajanma	Hindi
Kanoor Ki Malkin	Hindi
Kanthapura	Hindi
Malgudi days	Hindi
Chakravyuh	Hindi

Participated in Bigg Boss Kannada (season 7) as contestant.
