= Mooru Guttu Ondu Sullu Ondu Nija =

- VCD cover
- Directed by: Dinesh Baboo
- Written by: Dinesh Baboo
- Produced by: D Venkatesh Naidu; Rajeev K
- Starring: Ramesh Aravind; Komal; Sharan; Asha Latha; Nandini Vittal
- Music by: Suma Shastry
- Release date: 6 November 2009
- Country: India
- Language: Kannada

Mooru Guttu Ondu Sullu Ondu Nija (transl. Three secrets, one lie, one truth) is a 2009 Indian Kannada-language comedy drama film written and directed by Dinesh Babu. The film stars Ramesh Aravind in the lead role. Komal, Asha Latha and Sharan appear in supporting roles.

== Plot ==
The entire movie was shot in a single house. A family has four children with Komal, the eldest son, and three girls. The overall movie is a drama taking place in a house in one day. The parents are scheduled for a one-day trip to Tirupati. The children, knowing about it, the elder three children inform their lovers to come to their home.

The comedy starts when their aunt comes to sleep in their home. The lovers are supposed to hide in their rooms to not be seen by other siblings and the aunt. After some time Appu arrives with some relational links and sleeps in their home. He visits each of the children's rooms and the children hide their lovers. The next day when the parents arrive, various truths are exposed to them with some hard feelings.

== Cast ==
- Ramesh Aravind as Appu
- Komal as Siddaramu a.k.a. Siddu
- Nancy as Sonu
- Sharan
- Mandya Ramesh
- Asha Latha as a deaf aunty
- Srinivasa Murthy as an affluent person
- Sudha Belawadi

== Production ==
The film was shot in about ten to twenty days.

== Reception ==
=== Critical response ===
R G Vijayasarathy of Rediff.com scored the film at 3 out of 5 stars and says "Ramesh and Asha Latha shout in most of the sequences and this could have been avoided. And slapping on the cheek is another irritating factor in the film and it is certainly not comedy. Still, Mooru Guttu Ondhu Sullu Ondhu Nija is an enjoyable healthy comedy and a film like this has to be encouraged". A critic from The New Indian Express wrote "The film has no gory stunt scenes. It has only one song Yeddelo Madesha. Music director Suma Shastri has provided good background music. It is a worthy watch for families". BSS from Deccan Herald wrote "story takes a sentimental turn, but kudos to all the principal characters for not losing their poise. Though Ramesh’s dialogues smack of urbane intelligence, the actor doesn’t make it obvious. Komal is simply howlarious while Ashalatha comes second. ‘3Guttu, ondu sullu...’ is one of those films that can be viewed comfortably".
