= Kona (film) =

2025 Indian Kannada language film

- Directed by: Hari Krishna S
- Written by: Hari Krishna S
- Produced by: Tanisha Kuppanda; Kartik Kiran Sankapal; Ravi Kiran N
- Starring: Komal Kumar; Tanisha Kuppanda
- Cinematography: Venus Nagraj Murthy
- Edited by: Umesh R.B
- Music by: Shashank Sheshagiri
- Production company: Kuppandas Production
- Release date: 31 October 2025
- Country: India
- Language: Kannada

Kona (transl. Buffalo) is a 2025 Indian Kannada-language horror thriller film directed by Hari Krishna S. The film stars Komal Kumar, Tanisha Kuppanda in the lead role.

== Cast ==
- Komal Kumar as Narayana
- Tanisha Kuppanda as Lakshmi
- Raghu Ramankoppa
- Rithvi Jagadhish
- Vijay Chendoor
- M. K. Mutton
- Jagadish Kumar S

== Reception ==
Susmita Sameera of The Times of India said that "Kona stands as a horror drama that mixes folklore, mild fear, and bits of humour. Despite its uneven pacing and unsatisfying conclusion, it offers a visually appealing watch with moments that hold interest." A. Sharadhaa of The New Indian Express said that "Kona shifts in tone, but it boldly combines folklore with festival frenzy, superstition with satire, and fear with humour. It is visually rich, gently haunting, and often delightful." Y. Maheswara Reddy of the Bangalore Mirror said that "Kona is an entertaining mix of horror, folklore, and comedy. It is a good option for audiences looking for a lighthearted horror entertainer with a rural backdrop."
