= Radhan Ganda =

- Directed by: Murugan
- Written by: Murugan
- Produced by: N. Ravikumar
- Starring: Komal Kumar; Poorna
- Cinematography: Selva
- Edited by: Prasad
- Music by: Manikanth Kadri
- Production companies: Shanta Pictures; Confident Group
- Release date: 14 June 2013
- Country: India
- Language: Kannada

Radhan Ganda is a 2013 Indian Kannada comedy - action film written and directed by Murugan. It is produced by Confident Group along with Shanta Pictures. Komal Kumar and Poorna are in the lead roles. Manikanth Kadri has composed the soundtrack and film score. The core plot of the movie was based on the 2001 French movie My Wife Is an Actress.

== Cast ==
- Komal Kumar as Krishna
- Poorna as Radha
- Aryan as Aryan
- Poorna Kumar
- Sudarshan
- Kuri Prathap as Shivu

== Production ==
=== Title row ===
The earlier title of this film Radhikan Ganda kicked up a row for some time because of the name Radhika. The title had an uncanny reference towards former chief minister of Karnataka H. D. Kumaraswamy who had a secret relationship with former actress Radhika Kumaraswamy. Radhika had objected to the title name during its production. However, the makers have denied any relation between the film and the private life of the former chief minister. But due to the continuous objections raised, the director decided to rename the title as "Radhan Ganda".

== Soundtrack ==
Manikanth Kadri has composed 6 songs and the audio is released under Ashwini Media Networks banner.

No.	Song	Singer(s)
1	"Butterfly"	Sharmila, Manikanth Kadri
2	"Iruve Kachhide"	Rahul Nambiar, Sharmila
3	"Joot Maga"	Santhosh Venky
4	"Sundari"	Naveen Madhav, Vismaya Nayak
5	"Yeddu Bandano"	Palghat Sriram
6	"Sundari" Remix	Vismaya Nayak

== Reception ==
=== Critical response ===
A critic from The Times of India scored the film at 3 out of 5 stars and says "Why he kidnaps Radhika, and how Krishna manages to free her from the baddie’s clutches form the rest of the movie. Two of Manikanth Kadri’s songs are hummable. A spoof on Amitabh Bachchan set in Mumbai does not gel well, especially when the movie was to gain pace". A critic from Deccan Herald wrote "Selvam’s camerawork is adequate, K M Prakash’s editing crisp and Manikant Kadri’s tunes pleasing, with the Iruve Kachide song standing out. Komal is back in his groove and this Raadhan Ganda is not a bad guy to know after all!".
