= Amma Donga =

1995 Telugu film by Sagar

- Directed by: Sagar
- Written by: Vinay (Dialogues)
- Screenplay by: Ramani
- Story by: G. Satyamurthy
- Produced by: Ch. Sudhakar Babu; Bharathi Devi Mouli
- Starring: Krishna Ghattamaneni; Soundarya; Indraja; Aamani; Kota Srinivasa Rao
- Cinematography: V. Srinivasa Reddy
- Edited by: Gowtham Raju
- Music by: Koti
- Production company: Mouli Creations
- Release date: 12 January 1995
- Country: India
- Language: Telugu

Amma Donga is a 1995 Indian Telugu-language action comedy film directed by Sagar starring Krishna, Soundarya, Indraja, Aamani and Kota Srinivasa Rao. Koti scored and composed the film's soundtrack.

The film follows a daring young man who after being framed for multiple murders sets out to find the convicts, and clear his name. Released on 12 January coinciding with Sankranti festival, the film went on to be a superhit at the box office.

== Cast ==
- Krishna as Chakradhar
- Soundarya as Padmapriya
- Aamani as Alivelu
- Indraja as Mohana Kalyani
- Kota Srinivasa Rao as Kotayya
- Mallikarjuna Rao as Balaraju
- Tanikella Bharani as Sattipandu
- Srihari
- Brahmanandam
- Gundu Hanumantha Rao

== Soundtrack ==
Amma Donga

Soundtrack album by Koti
- Released: 9 December 1995
- Recorded: 1994
- Genre: Feature film soundtrack
- Length: 26:48
- Label: Aditya Music

Koti chronology
Amma Donga (1995)	Alluda Majaka (1995)

The film had its soundtrack album scored and composed by Koti.

- "Edho Manasu" — Mano, K. S. Chitra, S. P. Sailaja
- "Taha Taha" — S. P. Balasubrahmanyam, K. S. Chitra
- "Neetho Sayantram" — S.P.B., K. S. Chitra, Sailaja
- "Bolo Krishna" — S.P.B., K. S. Chitra
- "Jum Jummaney" — S.P.B., K. S. Chitra
- "Pill Adaraho" — Mano, Swarnalatha
