= Doni Sagali =

- Directed by: Rajendra Singh Babu
- Screenplay by: Rajendra Singh Babu
- Story by: C. N. Muktha
- Based on: Vimukthe by C. N. Muktha
- Produced by: H. N. Maruthi; N. M. Madhusudhan Gowda
- Starring: Soundarya; Shashikumar; Girish Shetty
- Cinematography: D. V. Rajaram
- Edited by: Basavaraj Urs
- Music by: V. Manohar
- Production company: Anjan Arts
- Release date: 7 April 1998
- Country: India
- Language: Kannada

Doni Saagali (transl. Let the boat sail) is a 1998 Indian Kannada-language drama film directed by Rajendra Singh Babu, who also wrote the screenplay based on the novel Vimukthe by Dr. C. N. Muktha. The film stars Soundarya and Shashikumar.

The film was released in 1998 and met with critical acclaim. The film went on to win Karnataka State Awards in 3 categories : Best Third film, best actress for Soundarya and best cinematographer for D. V. Rajaram. The film's soundtrack and score were composed by V. Manohar who also wrote the songs. The film was dubbed in Telugu as Mahila.

== Cast ==
- Soundarya as Kshama
- Shashikumar as Rajeev
- Suman Nagarkar as Deepti
- Girish Shetty
- Siddharth
- Harish Raj as Prasad
- Mynavathi
- Shankar Ashwath as Mohan
- Shanthamma
- Tennis Krishna
- Rajanand

== Soundtrack ==
Sl No.	Song title	Singer(s)	Lyrics
1	"Oho Chiguritu"	S. P. Balasubrahmanyam, K. S. Chithra	V. Manohar
2	"Nakshatrave"	K. S. Chithra	V. Manohar
3	"Ah Nidirege"	Rajesh Krishnan, K. S. Chithra	V. Manohar
4	"Swarada Sangama"	Ramesh Chandra, K. S. Chithra	V. Manohar
5	"Gulmohar"	K. S. Chithra	V. Manohar

== Reception ==
The Hindu wrote "The story follows such a natural course that one can almost predict what is coming next. The lack of tautness in narrative adds to the flab. The film falls flat, lacking the sensitivity needed for a story like this. "Doni Saagali" turns out to be a mushy film like many of its kind with little to differentiate it from the ordinary."

The Times of India wrote "Soundarya has done justice to her role, breathing heart and soul into it. However, in the second half of the movie her acting gains a tinge of 'histrionics' when she indulges in theatrical acts like screaming in a hospital and doing odd things in a zoo. After a long pause, Shashi Kumar stages a comeback and makes his presence felt as the jilted lover. A good watch, no doubt."
