= Raja (1999 film) =

- Theatrical poster
- Directed by: Muppalaneni Shiva
- Screenplay by: Muppalaneni Shiva
- Story by: Vikraman
- Based on: Unnidathil Ennai Koduthen (Tamil)
- Produced by: R. B. Choudary
- Starring: Venkatesh; Soundarya; Abbas
- Cinematography: Shyam K. Naidu
- Edited by: Marthand K. Venkatesh
- Music by: S. A. Rajkumar
- Production company: Super Good Films
- Release date: 18 March 1999
- Running time: 166 minutes
- Country: India
- Language: Telugu

Raja (transl. King) is a 1999 Indian Telugu-language romantic drama film directed by Muppalaneni Shiva and produced by R. B. Choudary under Super Good Films. It stars Venkatesh, Soundarya and Abbas in pivotal roles, with original soundtrack by S. A. Rajkumar. The film won three Filmfare South Awards including Best Film, Best Actress and Best Music Director. The film was a remake of the Tamil film Unnidathil Ennai Koduthen (1998). The film was a blockbuster at the Andhra Pradesh and Telangana box offices, and marked Venkatesh's sixth subsequent successful film.

== Plot ==
Raja and Balu are petty thieves. One day they take up the job of stealing an idol of Lord Ganesha from a temple. While escaping from the chasing people, they hide in a house, where Anjali, who is a governess takes care of three children when the other family members were away on a tour. She locks the two of them in the kitchen room for one week. Anjali, while spending time with the guys, realizes that they are not bad after all and develops a soft corner for Raja. They will be released on the day the family members return from the trip. Raja falls for Anjali, he tries to change his ways by working responsibly and also makes a habit of writing a diary as per her advice.

Before leaving the house, Balu steals Anjali's bag which contains her diary, which Raja later reads to learn much about her. Anjali is the illegitimate daughter of lawyer Viswanatham. After her mother's death, Anjali meets her father who accepts her as his daughter but has to bring her into his house as a maid. Viswanatham and his wife Bhagyam, her sister Jaya, her sister's husband Shankaram, and their three children live in the same house. Bhagyam's brother, Sanjay comes from Canada, Anjali likes Sanjay and Viswanatham wants to get them married, but Sanjay says, he needs at least three months to decide. After reading this, Raja decides not to express his love and hides his feelings for her.

After returning from the trip, Bhagyam finds out a diamond necklace is missing. When looking for it, she finds a cigarette bud in one of the drawers. She discovers that two thieves had stayed in the house and blames her for the theft and expels her. When Raja and Balu go to return the diary, find out and accommodate her in a hostel. Raja does many petty works to pay the hostel fees and help Anjali pursue singing after finding out her singing talent. He asks music director K. Chakravarthy to give her chance to sing. Anjali after singing a few songs becomes successful in her singing career and becomes rich. She stays in a bungalow with Raja and Balu.

Meanwhile, Viswanatham reveals the truth to his family, they all also accept Anjali and everyone comes to stay with Anjali. Even Sanjay also returns from Canada to marry Anjali, Sanjay and Raja becomes good friends, but Bhagyam and the gang starts to look down Raja and insults him a lot. Once when Anjali goes on a foreign tour, they blame the theft on Raja and throw him and Balu out of the house. Anjali returns from the tour, but she does not believe that Raja is a thief and she finds his diary which he forgot and understands how much love Raja has hidden in his heart for her.

At the same time, Anjali wins a National Award and her family members are making the wedding arrangements of Sanjay and Anjali. Her state fans association arranges a felicitation ceremony for Anjali, to which Raja and Balu attend the function by standing in the crowd, but Anjali sees him, she acknowledges her entire success at his feet and decides to marry him. In a flashback, it is shown that Anjali had informed her father about her love for Raja and how Sanjay had accepted it. Finally, the movie ends with Raja and Anjali leaving the function hand in hand.

== Cast ==
- Venkatesh as Raja
- Soundarya as Anjali
- Abbas as Sanjay
- Sudhakar as Balu
- Chandra Mohan as Viswanatham, Anjali's father
- Y. Vijaya as Bhagyam, Viswanatham's wife
- Sana as Jaya, Bhagyam's sister
- Tanikella Bharani as Shankaram, Jaya's husband
- Annapurna as Saraswati, Anjali's mother
- Brahmanandam as Delhi Dada
- A. V. S as House owner
- Chakravarthy as himself
- Junior Relangi as Swamiji
- Gautam Raju as constable
- Kallu Chidambaram
- Gadiraju Subba Rao
- Mukku Raju
- Chandra Mouli
- Bangalore Padma as Charvarthy's wife
- Uma Sarma
- Anitha Chowdary as Anchor
- Master Aajaa Mohara
- Baby Keertana
- Baby Srilalitha

== Soundtrack ==
Music composed by S. A. Rajkumar. Music released on Aditya Music. Most of the tunes were retained from the original including "Edho Oka" is based on "Edho Oru Paattu" from Unnidathil Ennai Koduthen. The song "Kavvinchake" was newly composed.

Tracklist
No.	Title	Lyrics	Singer(s)	Length
1.	"Edho Oka" (female)	Sirivennela Seetharama Sastry	K. S. Chithra	4:25
2.	"Kavvinchake"	Sirivennela Seetharama Sastry	Rajesh Krishnan, Sujatha	4:19
3.	"Mellela Vaana"	Sirivennela Seetharama Sastry	K. S. Chithra, Mano	4:50
4.	"Edho Oka" (male)	Sirivennela Seetharama Sastry	S. P. Balasubrahmanyam	4:58
5.	"Shepu Choosi"	E. S. Murthy	Gopal Rao, Anupama	4:48
6.	"Kannula Logililo"	Sirivennela Seetharama Sastry	K. S. Chithra, P. Unni Krishnan	4:39
7.	"Pallavinchu Tholi"	Shanmukha Sharma	K. S. Chithra	4:15
Total length:				32:17

== Release ==
The film theatrically released on 18th March 1999. The film currently available on Prime Video. Gemini TV became broadcasting partner for film making it fresh movie ever.

== Reception ==
Deccan Herald wrote "Raja, a simple romantic tale simply told in a simple way, tries to tug your heartstrings. Due to controlled performances from the lead pair, it does succeed to an extent." Zamin Ryot wrote.

== Box office ==
It had a 100-day run in 71 centres. It had a 175-day run in 4 centres.

== Accolades ==
Filmfare Awards South

- Best Film – Telugu – R. B. Choudary
- Best Actress – Telugu – Soundarya
- Best Music Director – Telugu – S. A. Rajkumar

== Bibliography ==
- Dasgupta, Rohit K.; Datta, Sangeeta (2018). 100 Essential Indian Films. Rowman & Littlefield. ISBN 9781442277991.
