= Pavitra Bandham =

- Theatrical poster
- Directed by: Muthyala Subbaiah
- Written by: Posani Krishna Murali (dialogues)
- Screenplay by: Muthyala Subbaiah
- Story by: Bhupathi Raja
- Produced by: C. Venkataraju, G. Sivaraju
- Starring: Venkatesh; Soundarya
- Cinematography: K. Ravindra Babu
- Edited by: Gautham Raju
- Music by: M. M. Keeravani
- Production company: Geeta Chitra International
- Release date: 17 October 1996
- Running time: 147 minutes
- Country: India
- Language: Telugu

Pavitra Bandham (transl. The Holy Bond) is a 1996 Indian Telugu-language romantic drama film directed and co-written by Muthyala Subbaiah. It stars Venkatesh and Soundarya, while S. P. Balasubrahmanyam, Prakash Raj, Srihari, and Brahmanandam play supporting roles. The music was composed by M. M. Keeravani. The film was produced by C. Venkataraju and G. Sivaraju under the Geeta Chitra International banner. The film was declared a blockbuster at the Andhra Pradesh and Telangana box offices.

The film won three Andhra Pradesh State Nandi Awards. Owing to its success, it was remade in six other languages - in Odia as Suhaag Sindura (1998), in Kannada as Mangalyam Tantunanena (1998), in Hindi as Hum Aapke Dil Mein Rehte Hain (1999), in Tamil as Priyamaanavale (2000) and in Bangladeshi as E Badhon Jabena Chhire (2000).

== Plot ==
Vijay is the son of rich industrialist Viswanath and is heavily westernised, having grown up in the US and having no interest in marriage; his goal is to enjoy his youth as much as possible. Viswanath wants his son to marry and become responsible; his insistence makes Vijay agree to marry, but with a unique condition — a kind of test drive. The marriage will be for a single year initially, and at the end of the year, he can choose to continue it or not, depending on his attitude towards his wife; during that duration, the marriage will be annulled. Radha, Viswanath's personal secretary, is a hardworking young woman struggling to support her family. Viswanath asks Radha to quit her job and marry his son, but she refuses when she hears Vijay's strange condition. However, Radha's family is in dire financial straits, so she has to reconsider the offer. In return for marrying Vijay, she asks for financial support for her family, which Viswanath readily provides.

Vijay and Radha get married. After the marriage, they become friendly, and Radha goes out of her way to care for Vijay when he has an accident. At the end of the year, however, Vijay decides to annul the marriage, as had been agreed upon. Radha leaves Vijay and returns home. After the separation, Vijay begins to feel a longing for his devoted wife's presence. When he realizes her worth and wants her to come back, she declines. Meanwhile, Radha finds out that she is pregnant. To support herself, she gets a job at a new company; to her surprise, the company's managing director is Vijay. He later confesses to her that he has changed and wants her back. But even after repeated persuasion, she disagrees because her faith in him has been shattered. Vijay still pursues her and leaves no stone unturned to show her he cares. Later, Radha and her family hold a ceremony for the well-being of her to-be-born child. Viswanath and Vijay also attend the ceremony. Radha reveals Vijay to be her husband and tells the guests about the marriage contract. An argument follows; Vijay and his father walk out, followed by all the guests.

Near the completion of her pregnancy, Radha learns that troublemakers Dileep and Jayaram, who had once attempted to kill Vijay, have escaped from prison. They are out looking for Vijay, who had fired them from his father's company for cheating and fraud. Radha gets anxious and tries to reach Vijay as soon as possible. On the way, she learns that Vijay's friends set the whole thing up to lure her back to her husband. However, Dilip and Jayaram have attacked Vijay in reality and brutally stabbed him. Enraged, Radha goes to confront Vijay, and as soon as she meets him, she accuses him of this shameless act. As she turns to leave, he staggers, and in a cry of pain, takes out the broken glass that Jayaram stabbed him with from his stomach. Radha, upon seeing his wound, runs towards him but slips, falls, and goes into labor. Vijay, summoning up all his strength, takes Radha to the hospital. On the way, Dileep and Jayaram attempt to kill them, but fail and die in a truck accident. While in the hospital, Vijay is treated for his injuries and Radha delivers a healthy baby boy. After being discharged from the hospital, they get back together again.

== Cast ==
- Venkatesh as Vijay
- Soundarya as Radha Vijay
- S. P. Balasubrahmanyam as Viswanath, Vijay's father
- Prakash Raj as Dileep
- Srihari as Jayaram
- Brahmanandam as Brahmam, Vijay's driver
- Sudhakar as Prasad, Vijay's friend
- Subhalekha Sudhakar as Shankar, Radha's brother
- Annapoorna as Radha's mother
- Syelaja as Radha's sister
- Posani Krishna Murali as Radha's brother-in-law
- Suthi Velu as Ramaiyah, Vijay's house help
- Ragini as Padmini "Paddu", Brahmam's wife
- Juttu Narasimham as Brahmam's father-in-law, Paddu's father
- Kallu Chidambaram as Beggar
- Jenny
- Sherri as Anitha, Dileep's sister; Vijay's one-sided lover
- Annuja as Lalitha "Lalli", Prasad's wife; Paddu's sister
- Vani as Seeta, Radha's younger sister
- Kishore Rathi
- Ooma Sharma

== Soundtrack ==
Pavithra Bandham

Film score by M. M. Keeravani
- Released: 1996
- Genre: Feature film soundtrack
- Length: 25:42
- Label: T-Series

M. M. Keeravani chronology
Jabilamma Pelli (1996)	Pavithra Bandham (1996)	Priyaragalu (1996)

Music was composed by M. M. Keeravani. Music was released on T-Series Audio Company. The song "Aparupamainadamma" was reused in the film's Tamil and Hindi remakes.

Track list
No.	Title	Lyrics	Singer(s)	Length
1.	"Maayadari Andama"	Sirivennela Sitaramasastri	S. P. Balasubrahmanyam, Sujatha Mohan	3:52
2.	"Chali Kodatandi"	Bhuvanachandra	S. P. Balasubrahmanyam, Chitra	4:37
3.	"Paatante Paata Kadu"	Bhuvanachandra	Suresh Peters, Anuradha Sriram	2:58
4.	"Isaalakidee"	Sirivennela Sitaramasastri	S. P. Balasubrahmanyam, Asha Bhosle	6:02
5.	"Oh My Daddy"	Sirivennela Sitaramasastri	S. P. Balasubrahmanyam, Mano, Chitra	4:48
6.	"Apurupamainadamma Aadajanma"	Sirivennela Sitaramasastri	K. J. Yesudas	4:45
Total length:				25:42

== Reception ==
A critic from Andhra Today opined that "The movie 'Pavithra Bandham' has a good message for the present day youth obsessed by the western culture. The movie sends across a clear message that marriage is a unique relationship".

== Awards ==
Nandi Awards - 1996

- Best Feature Film - Gold - C. Venkata Raju
- Best Actress - Soundarya
- Best Supporting Actor - S. P. Balasubrahmanyam

== Remakes ==
The film was remade in Odia as Suhaag Sindhura (1996), in Kannada as Mangalyam Tantunanena (1998), in Hindi as Hum Aapke Dil Mein Rehte Hain (1999), in Tamil as Priyamaanavale (2000) and in Bangla as Saat Paake Bandha (2009).
