= Aaro Pranam =

- Theatrical release poster
- Directed by: Veeru K
- Written by: Veeru K
- Produced by: V. Srinivasa Reddy
- Starring: Vineeth; Soundarya
- Cinematography: V. Srinivasa Reddy
- Music by: Veeru K
- Release date: 26 September 1997
- Running time: 140 minutes
- Country: India
- Language: Telugu

Aaro Pranam (transl. Sixth Life) is a 1997 Indian Telugu-language film directed by Veeru K and stars Vineeth and Soundarya.

== Plot ==
The film is about a relationship between a man, Chanti, and a woman, Akankshaa, who is one year older than the man. How they convince their relatives to accept their relationship forms the rest of the story.

== Cast ==
- Vineeth as Chanti
- Soundarya as Aakaanksha
- S. P. Balasubrahmanyam as Kodandapani, Chanti's father
- Lakshmi as Chanti's mother
- Bramhanandam as College Professor
- Vadivelu as Chanti's friend
- Nassar as Yaswanth, Aakaanksha's father
- Radhika as Aakaanksha's mother
- Nirmalamma as Chanti's grandmother
- Tanikella Bharani
- M. S. Narayana
- Babu Mohan

== Production ==
The film was shot at Annapurna Studios in Hyderabad. The film was initially planned as a bilingual, with a Tamil title of Kadallikkalam Vaa, but eventually was not made.

== Soundtrack ==
All music is composed by Veeru K.

Tracklist
No.	Title	Lyrics	Singer(s)	Length
1.	"Preminchava"	Sirivennela Seetharama Sastry	Annupamaa, K. S. Chithra, S. P. Balasubrahmanyam
2.	"Pedaviki Pedavi"	Chandrabose	Lavanya, Mano
3.	"Chelli Chenta Levu"	Saddeve Devendra	K. S. Chithra, S. P. Balasubrahmanyam
4.	"Tell Me You Love Me"	Saddeve Devendra	K. S. Chithra, S. P. Balasubrahmanyam
5.	"Venavantra Abbai"	Sirivennela Seetharama Sastry	Jikki, S. P. Balasubrahmanyam, Mano, Sujatha Mohan
6.	"Makhana Makhana"	Bhuvana Chandra	Mano, Rajgopal Reddy

== Reception and legacy ==
A critic from Andhra Today opined that "With a talented director like Veeru as the story writer and music director the movie is splendid, but the story is a slight let down".

The concept of a man dating an older woman is prevalent in the film Ye Maaya Chesave.

== Awards ==
Year	Award	Nominee	Outcome	Ref.
1997	Nandi Award for Best First Film of a Director	Veeru K	Won	
1997	Nandi Special Jury Award	Chanti (Art Director)	Won	
