= Na D'Souza =

Indian novelist (1937–2025)

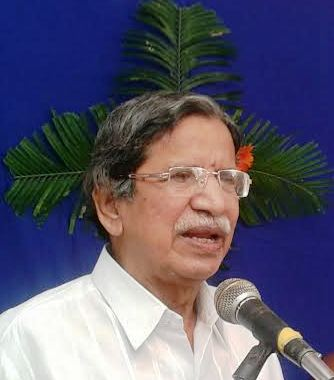
- Born: Norbert D'Souza; 6 June 1937; Sagara, Kingdom of Mysore, British India (now in Shivamogga district, Karnataka, India)
- Died: 5 January 2025 (aged 87); Mangaluru, Karnataka, India
- Occupation: Writer
- Writing career
- Genres: Fiction, history

Norbert D'Souza (6 June 1937 – 5 January 2025) was an Indian writer in the Kannada language. He was the President of 80th Kannada Sahitya Sammelana held in Madikeri in the year 2014.

== Life and career ==
Na D'Souza was born in Sagara, Karnataka on 6 June 1937. He completed his primary education at St. Joseph's higher primary school and higher studies at Sahyadri College, Shimoga. He worked in the Karnataka Public Works Department for 37 years. He was married to Philomena D' Souza and had three children.

Na D'Souza wrote more than 40 novels, many short stories, plays and literature for children and total number of his published books cross 94. He received Central Sahitya Academy's Bala Sahitya Puraskar for his children novel Mulugadeya Oorige Bandavaru. He wrote in Kannada for more than three decades and his two novels Dweepa and Kadina Benki were made into motion pictures and won National awards. He also participated in agitations of public interest. Some of his works like Dweepa have been translated into English.

D'Souza died on 5 January 2025, at the age of 87.

== Accolades ==
- Karnataka Sahitya Academy award – 1993
- Karnataka Rajyotsava Award – 1998
- Alwas Nudisiri Award – 2006
- Honorary Doctorate (D.Lit) by Kuvempu University

== Bibliography ==
- D'Souza, Na (2011). Mulugade (Kannada Novel) (2nd ed.). Ravindra Pustakalaya Chamarajpet Sagar-577 401, India.
