= Foreshore Estate =

Foreshore Estate Pattinapakkam
- neighbourhood
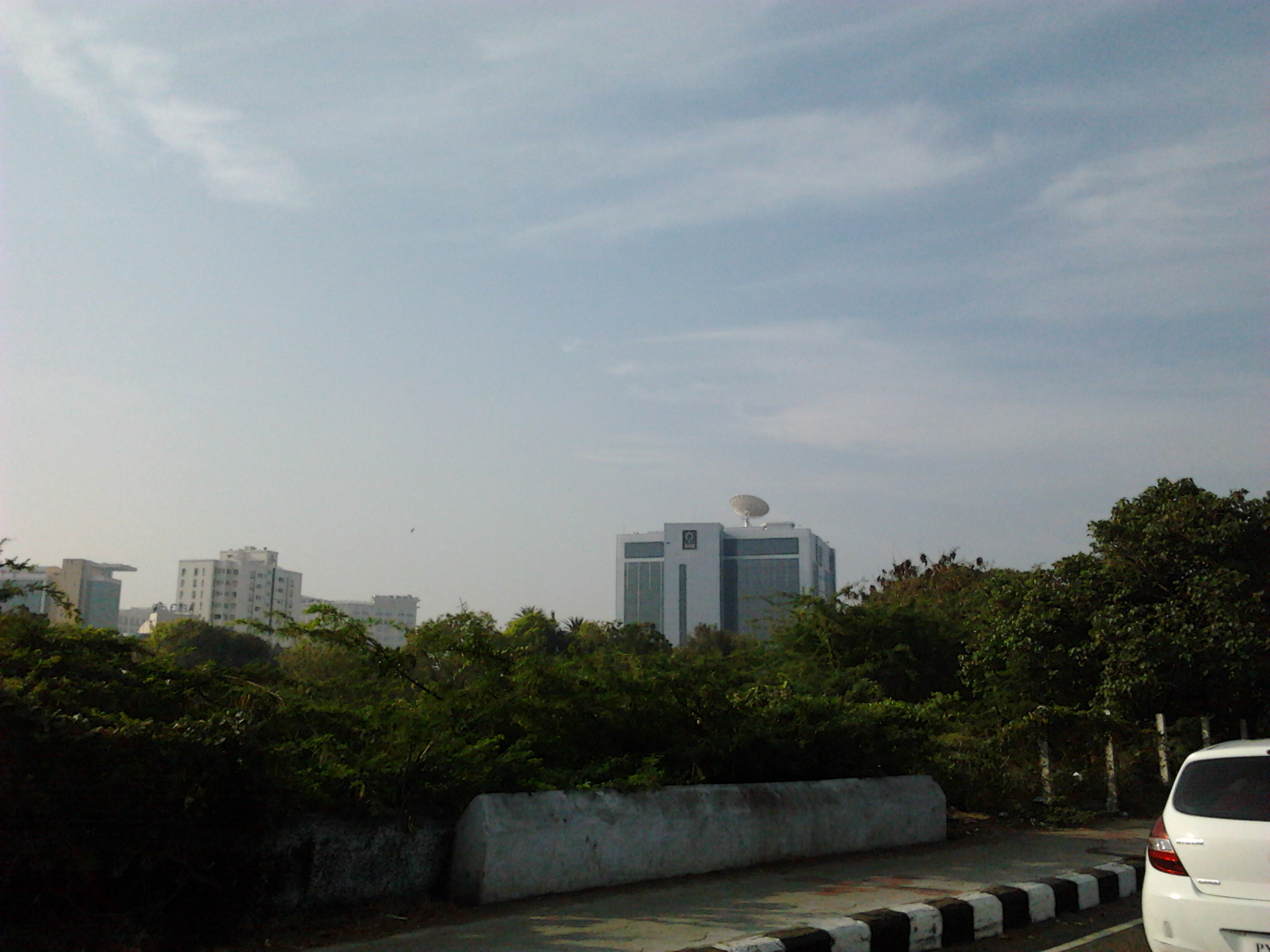
- Sun Network Headquarters as seen from Foreshore Estate.

- Location within Chennai Location within Tamil Nadu Location within India
- Coordinates: 13.0301°N 80.2771°E
- Country: India
- State: Tamil Nadu
- District: Chennai District
- Metro: Chennai

Government
  - Body: Chennai Corporation
- Elevation: 53 m (174 ft)

Languages
  - Official: Tamil
- Time zone: UTC+5:30 (IST)
- Planning agency: CMDA
- Civic agency: Chennai Corporation
- Website: www.chennai.tn.nic.in

Foreshore Estate (Tamil: பட்டினப்பாக்கம் Pattinapakkam) is a neighbourhood in Chennai, India. It is situated along the southern stretch of the Marina Beach. The proposed Marina Business centre commercial complex on 25 acre land at Foreshore Estate in Chennai, is planned to develop by the State Government of Tamil Nadu.

It is one of the primary sites in the city for the immersion of the Ganesh (Vinayaka) murtis during the annual Ganesh festival. The Ganesh mūrtis are first paraded down South Marina Beach (Kamaraj Salai) before being brought to Foreshore Estate for immersion in the sea. The festival takes place in September. Some of the buses plying through Foreshore Estate are 6A, 6D, 12B, 21B, 21D, 21E, 21L, 27D, PP51, PP19, PP21 and PP66.

== Picture Gallery ==
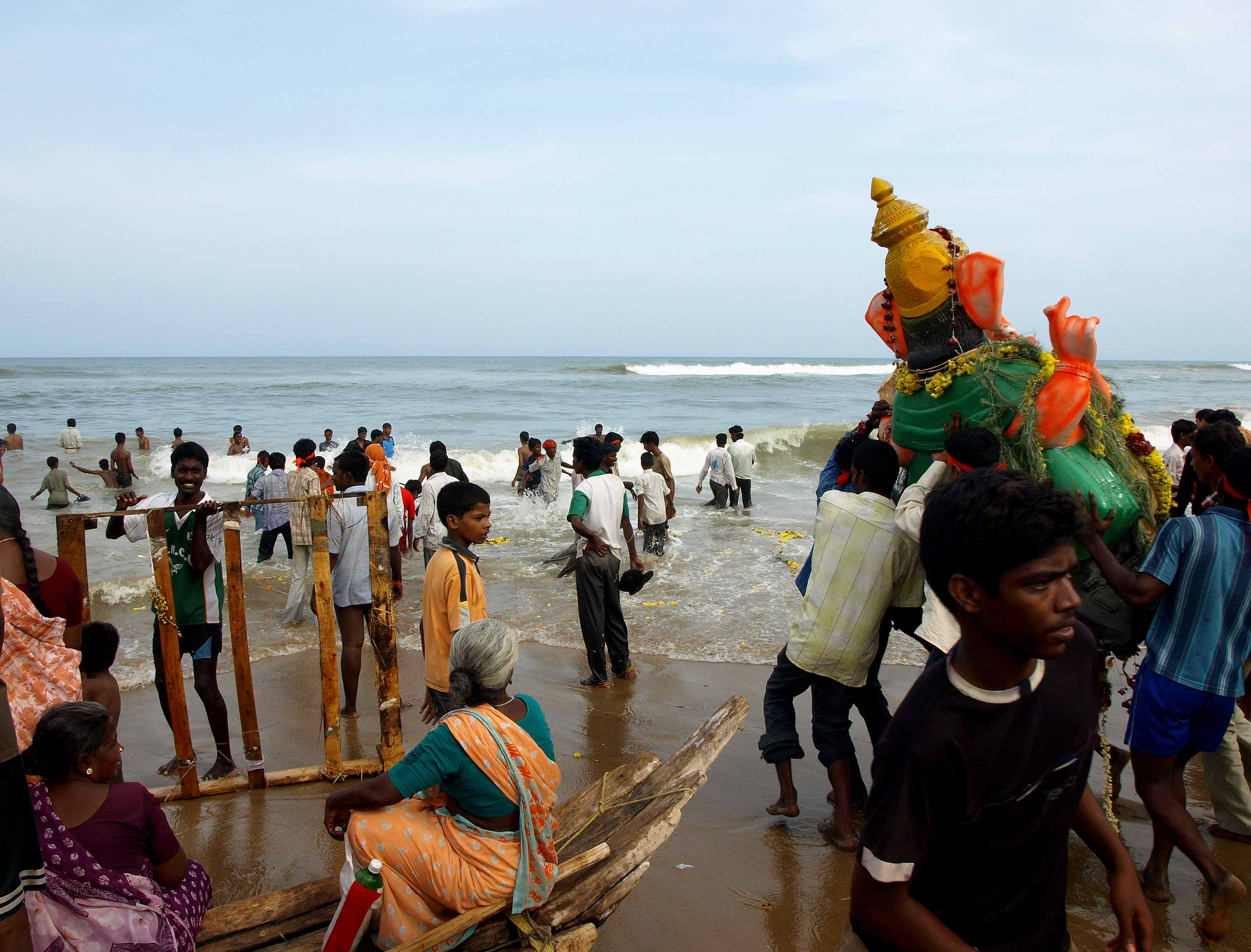
Immersion of Ganesh at Foreshore Estate

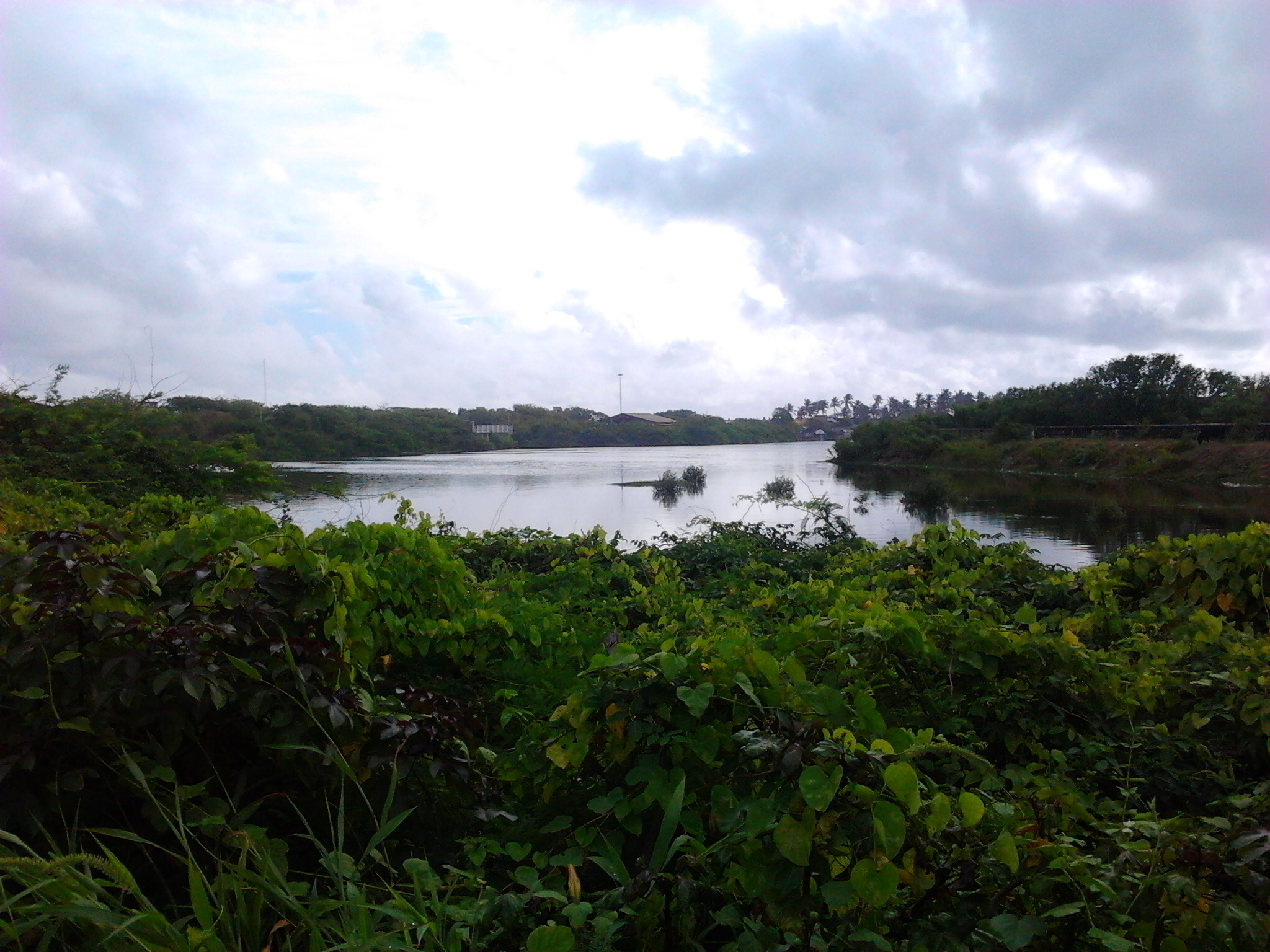
Adyar Creek at Foreshore Estate

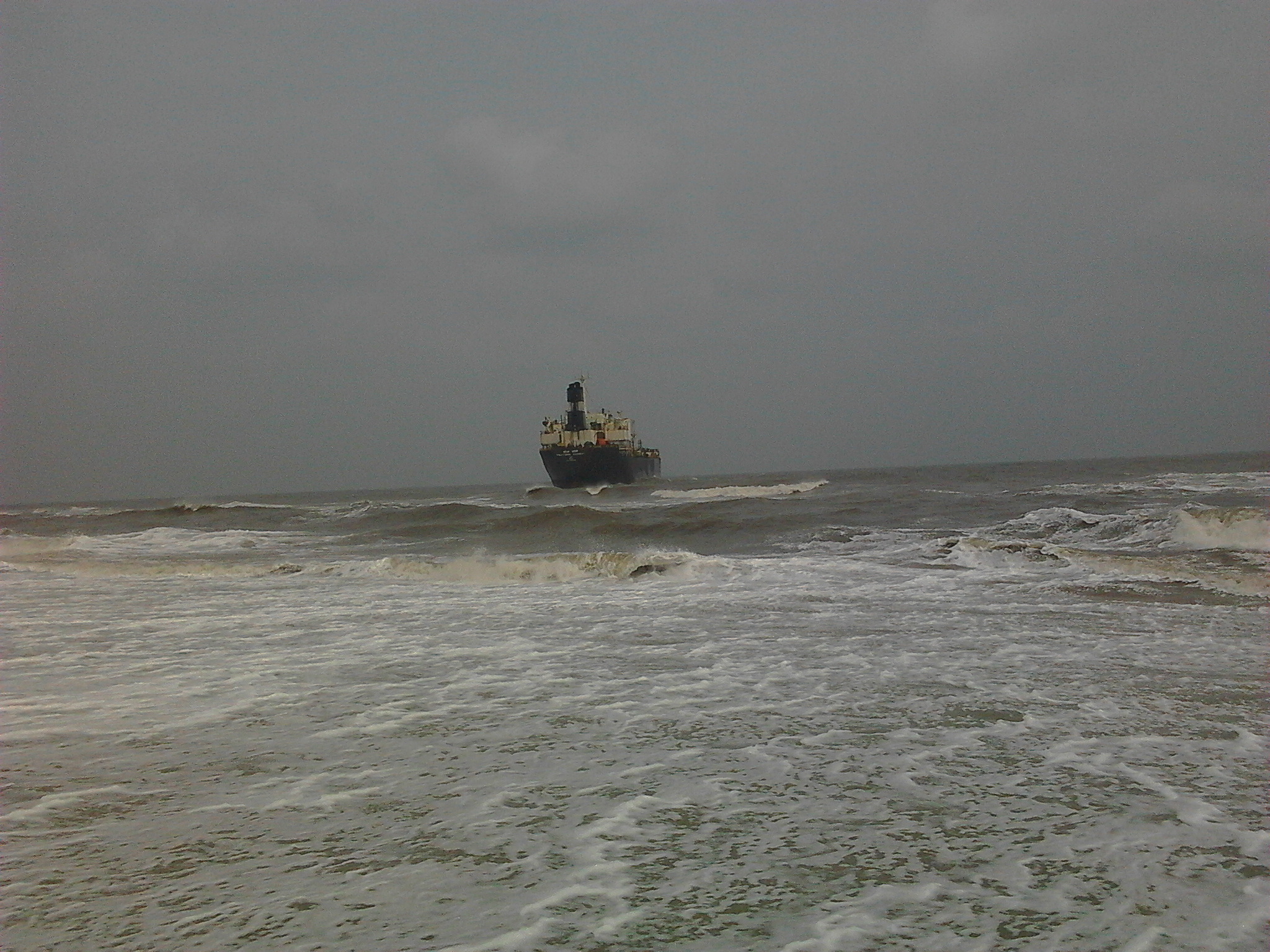
Aftermath of Cyclone Nilam - A ship pushed to shore - Foreshore Estate

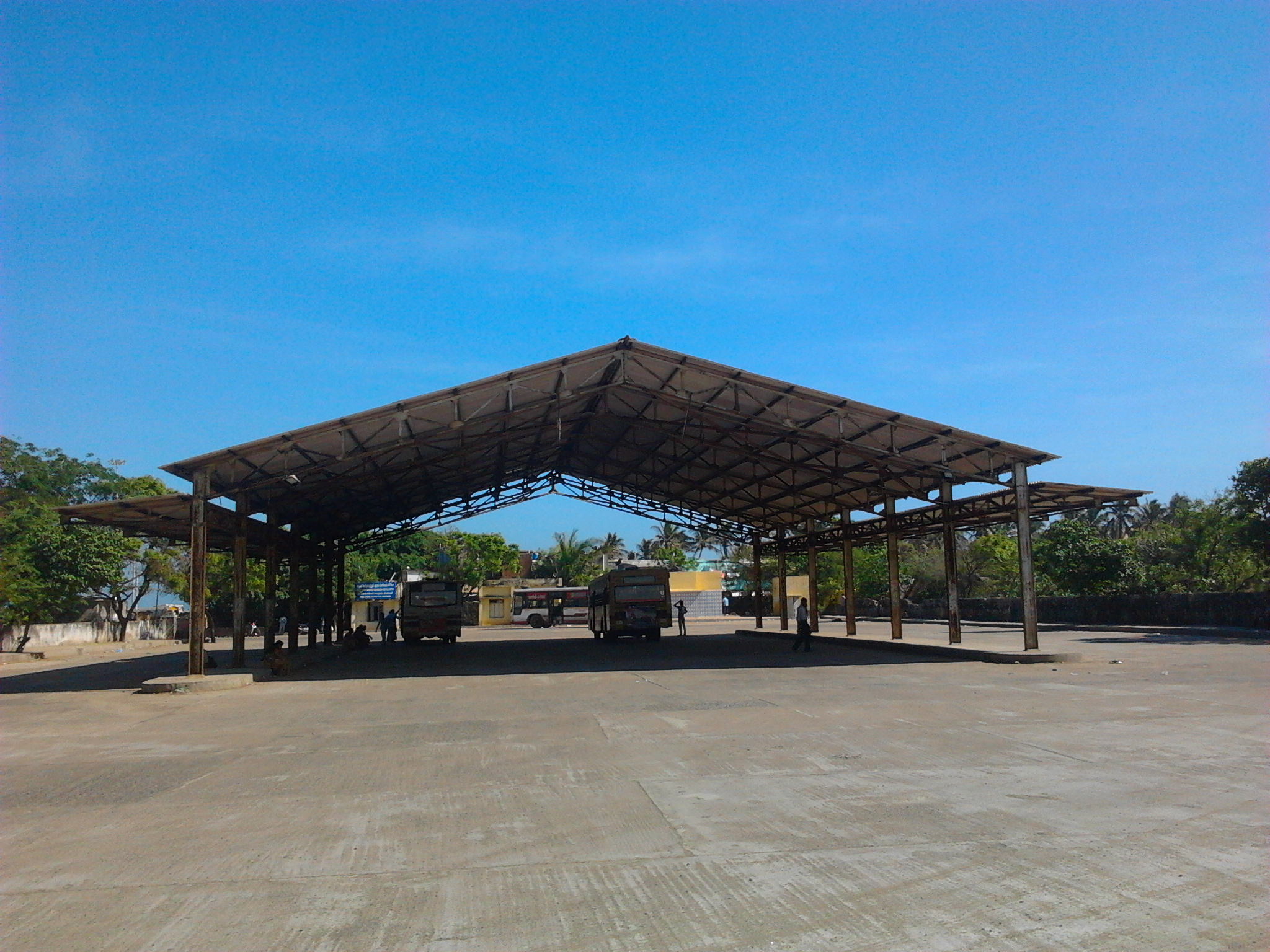
Foreshore Estate MTC bus stand.
