= Soundarya =

Indian actress, producer

- Soundarya in 2002
- Born: Sowmya Sathyanarayana; 18 July, 1972 or 1976 (Note: Year of birth is uncertain, as various sources claim 1972 and 1976); Mulabagilu, Kolar district, Karnataka, India
- Died: 17 April 2004; Bengaluru, Karnataka, India
- Occupations: Actress, producer
- Years active: 1992–2004
- Works: Full list
- Spouse: G. S. Raghu (m.2003)

Sowmya Sathyanarayana (18 July, 1972 or 1976 – 17 April 2004), better known by her stage name Soundarya, was an Indian actress known for her works primarily in Telugu cinema. She was regarded as one of the greatest actresses in the history of Telugu cinema. She also acted in a few Kannada, Tamil, Hindi and Malayalam films. She has received three Nandi Awards, two Karnataka State Film Awards and six Filmfare Awards South. In 2002, she received the National Film Award for Best Feature Film as a producer for the Kannada film Dweepa.

Soundarya established herself as the most popular Telugu actress of the 1990s and is best known for her performances in films such as Ammoru (1995), Pavitra Bandham (1996), Anthahpuram (1998), Raja (1999), Doni Saagali (1998), Dweepa (2002) and Apthamitra (2004). She won three Nandi Awards for Pavitra Bandham and Special Jury Prize for Ammoru and Anthahpuram.

== Personal life ==
Soundarya was born in Mulabagilu, Kolar district and brought up in Bengaluru. Her parents are K. S. Sathyanarayana and Manjula. Her father was a Kannada film writer and producer. She discontinued her Intermediate after her first year in Bangalore. Soundarya's birthdate has been reported inconsistently by the media. While some sources indicate the birthdate as 18 July, 1972, her cousin and others stated it to be 18 July, 1976. On 27 April 2003, she married G. S. Raghu, a software engineer by profession.

== Career ==
Soundarya's first film was the Kannada film Baa Nanna Preethisu, directed by S. Siddalingaiah, released in April 1992, immediately followed by Gandharva in July, 1992 which was a hit. She did lead roles in Kannada and went on to become a popular actress. Her first film in Telugu was Manavarali Pelli (1993).

In Tamil, she got major acclaim for her debut film Ponnumani (1993), opposite Karthik for playing the role of a mentally disabled person.

Real commercial recognition came to her with Hello Brother (1994), directed by E. V. V. Satyanarayana, in which she starred alongside Nagarjuna and Ramya Krishna. She has also collaborated with actor Karthik for Muthu Kaalai (1995). She played an award-winning role in Ammoru (1995), directed by Kodi Ramakrishna, starring alongside Ramya Krishna and Suresh and played the role of Bhavani, a devotee of Goddess Ammoru. She had eleven releases in 1995.

She continued her successful run with Amma Donga (1995), Sipayi (1996), Pavitra Bandham (1996), Maa Aayana Bangaram (1997), Dongaata (1997), Aaro Pranam (1997) and Osi Na Maradala (1997). She also starred alongside Rajinikanth in Arunachalam (1997), which became the highest-grossing film of 1997 in Tamil cinema. The industry regarded her to be the golden hand, as a former director's daughter, she always regarded the success not as a one-man show, but teamwork across 36 departments.

In 1998, Doni Saagali in Kannada were commercially successful. In Tamil, she also starred alongside Kamal Haasan and Prabhudeva in Kaathala Kaathala directed by Singeetam Srinivas Rao. Choodalani Vundi opposite Chiranjeevi took her to the pinnacle. Anthahpuram, directed by Krishna Vamsi, stood as one of the finest performances of Soundarya in her career, winning her a State Nandi Award for Best Actress and also her second consecutive Filmfare Award for Best Actress.

The romantic drama Raja (1999), opposite Venkatesh, was another blockbuster and won her a third Filmfare Award. Her other releases, Padayappa (1999) opposite Rajinikanth. She starred opposite Amitabh Bachchan in the Hindi movie Sooryavansham. Premaku Velayera (1999), Premaku Swagatam (2002) with J. D. Chakravarthy further solidified her position.

She starred in Annayya (2000), opposite Chiranjeevi, Ninne Premistha (2000) and Azad (2000), opposite Nagarjuna, Jayam Manadera (2000) and Devi Putrudu (2001) opposite Venkatesh, and several others that displayed her acting abilities and Sri Manjunatha (2001) opposite Arjun Sarja. She shared screen space with actor Vijayakanth for Thavasi (2001) and Chokka Thangam (2003).

In 2002, she received the National Film Award for Best Feature Film (producer) for Dweepa. She has acted in the Malayalam comedy film Yathrakarude Sradhakku (2002) with Jayaram and Kilichundan Mampazham (2003), with Mohanlal and Sreenivasan.

In 2004, Balakrishna announced the remake of Nartanasala, and a launch event was held in Hyderabad. Soundarya was signed to play Draupadi but the film was shelved following her death. However the first 17 minutes are available to stream online.

Her last film was Apthamitra, a runaway hit starring Vishnuvardhan and Ramesh Arvind. The film won her the Filmfare Award for Best Actress – Kannada posthumously in 2004.

She worked with almost all the top directors, like Dasari Narayana Rao, K. Raghavendra Rao, Singeetam Srinivasa Rao, A. Kodandarami Reddy, Priyadarshan, Girish Kasaravalli, S. V. Krishna Reddy, K. S. Ravikumar, Krishna Vamsi, Kodi Ramakrishna, E. V. V. Satyanarayana, Muthyala Subbaiah, Gunasekhar, P. Vasu, Muppalaneni Shiva, Bharathi Kannan, Sundar C.

== Death ==
On 17 April 2004, Soundarya died in an aircraft crash along with her brother Amarnath in Bengaluru.

The aircraft, a Cessna 180, took off at 11:05 a.m. and turned west before crashing on the campus of the Gandhi Krishi Vigyan Kendra of the University of Agricultural Sciences. It had reached a height of 150 feet (46 m) and, before achieving required rate of climb speed, took a steep left turn leading to a stall. It crashed into the ground nose down and burst into flames. B. N. Ganapathi, one of the two persons working on the experimental fields of the university, who rushed to the aircraft to save the occupants, said the plane wobbled before the crash.

== Legacy ==
Soundarya is regarded as one of the greatest actresses in the history of Telugu cinema. She was known as a versatile actress, who played distinctive roles. Critics noted that she had a fine sense of characterisation. Due to this ability, Soundarya struck a chord with the Telugu audience despite being from Karnataka. Ammoru, Pavithra Bandham, Doni Saagali, Raja, Sooryavansham, and Dweepa are her best known films that saw her playing strong female characters.

== Awards and nominations ==
List of awards and nominations
Year	Award	Category	Film	Result	Ref.
1995	Filmfare Awards South	Best Actress – Telugu	Ammoru	Won	
1995	Nandi Awards	Special Jury Award	Ammoru	Won	
1996	Nandi Awards	Best Actress	Pavithra Bandham	Won	
1998	Karnataka State Film Awards	Best Actress	Doni Saagali	Won	
1998	Filmfare Awards South	Best Actress – Telugu	Anthapuram	Won	
1998	Nandi Awards	Special Jury Award	Anthapuram	Won	
1999	Filmfare Awards South	Best Actress – Telugu	Raja	Won	
2001	Filmfare Awards South	Best Actress - Tamil	Thavasi	Nominated	
2002	Filmfare Awards South	Best Supporting Actress - Tamil	Ivan	Nominated	
2003	National Film Awards	Best Feature Film	Dweepa	Won	
2003	Karnataka State Film Awards	Best Actress	Dweepa	Won	
2003	Filmfare Awards South	Best Actress – Kannada	Dweepa	Won	
2003	Filmfare Awards South	Best Film – Kannada	Dweepa	Won	
2004	Filmfare Awards South	Best Actress – Kannada	Apthamitra (Posthumously awarded)	Won	
