= 54th Filmfare Awards South =

Award ceremony for South Indian films

- Date: 4 August 2007
- Site: Hyderabad, India

The 54th Filmfare Awards South ceremony honouring the winners and nominees of the best of South Indian cinema in 2006 is an event that was held at the Hyderabad International Convention Centre Hitex, Hyderabad on 4 August 2007.

== Main awards ==
Winners are listed first, highlighted in boldface.

=== Kannada cinema ===
Best Film	Best Director
**Mungaru Male**	**Indrajit Lankesh – Aishwarya**
Best Actor	Best Actress
**Puneeth Rajkumar – Arasu**	**Ramya – Tananam Tananam**
Best Supporting Actor	Best Supporting Actress
**Rangayana Raghu – Cyanide**	**Leelavathi – Kannadada Kanda**
Best Music Director	Best Lyricist
**Mano Murthy – Mungaru Male**	**K. Kalyan – Tananam Tananam**
Best Male Playback Singer	Best Female Playback Singer
**Hemanth Kumar – Kallarali Hoovagi**	**K. S. Chithra – My Autograph**

=== Malayalam cinema ===
Best Film	Best Director
**Notebook**	**Roshan Andrews – Notebook**
Best Actor	Best Actress
**Mammootty – Karutha Pakshikal**	**Padmapriya Janakiraman – Karutha Pakshikal**
Best Supporting Actor	Best Supporting Actress
**Jagathy Sreekumar – Vaasthavam**	**Roma Asrani – Notebook**
Best Music Director	Best Lyricist
**Raveendran – Vadakkumnadhan**	**Gireesh Puthenchery – Vadakkumnadhan**
Best Male Playback Singer	Best Female Playback Singer
**K. J. Yesudas – Vadakkumnadhan**	**K. S. Chithra – Vadakkumnadhan**

=== Tamil cinema ===
Best Film	Best Director
**Veyyil**	**Vasanthabalan – Veyyil**
Best Actor	Best Actress
**Ajith Kumar – Varalaru**	**Bhavana – Chithiram Pesuthadi**
Best Supporting Actor	Best Supporting Actress
**Pasupathy – E**	**Saranya Ponvannan – Emmtan-Magan**
Best Music Director	Best Lyricist
**A. R. Rahman – Sillunu Oru Kadhal**	**Na. Muthukumar – Veyyil** ("Urugude Marugude")
Best Male Playback Singer	Best Female Playback Singer
**Gaana Ulaganathan – Chithiram Pesuthadi** ("Vaala Meenukkum")	**Shreya Ghoshal – Sillunu Oru Kadhal** ("Munbe Vaa")

=== Telugu cinema ===
Best Film	Best Director
**Bommarillu**; Godavari; Pokiri; Sri Ramadasu	**Puri Jagannadh – Pokiri**; Bhaskar – Bommarillu; S. S. Rajamouli – Vikramarkudu; Sekhar Kammula – Godavari
Best Actor	Best Actress
**Mahesh Babu – Pokiri**; Jr. NTR – Rakhi; Nagarjuna – Sri Ramadasu; Siddharth – Bommarillu	**Genelia D'Souza – Bommarillu**; Aarthi Agarwal – Andala Ramudu; Geetha Singh – Kithakithalu; Ileana D'Cruz – Pokiri; Kamilini Mukherjee – Godavari
Best Supporting Actor	Best Supporting Actress
**Saikumar – Samanyudu**; Nassar – Pokiri; Prakash Raj – Bommarillu; Rajendra Prasad – Bhagyalakshmi Buperdraw	**Sandhya – Annavaram**; Charmy Kaur – Rakhi; Jayasudha – Bommarillu; Jayasudha – Style
Best Music Director	Best Lyricist
**Devi Sri Prasad – Bommarillu**; Chakri – Devadasu; K. M. Radha Krishnan – Godavari; Mani Sharma – Pokiri	**Veturi – Godavari** ("Uppongile Godavari"); Bhaskarabhatla – Bommarillu – "Bommanu Geesthe"; Sirivennela – Pournami – "Muvvala Navvakala"; Kandikonda – Pokiri – "Samarame"
Best Male Playback Singer	Best Female Playback Singer
**S. P. Balasubrahmanyam – Sri Ramadasu** ("Adigo Bhadradri"); Chakri – Devadasu – "Nuvvantene Ishtam"; Nihal – Pokiri – "Gala Gala"; Siddharth – Bommarillu – "Apudo Ipudo"; Rajesh - Astram - "Prema Kanna"	**Mamta Mohandas – Rakhi** ("Rakhee Rakhee"); Gopika Poornima – Bommarillu – "Bommanu Geesthe"; K. S. Chitra – Godavari – "Manasa Vaacha"; K. S. Chitra – Pournami – "Muvvala Navvakala"

== Technical Awards ==
Best Choreography: Raghava Lawrence – Style	Best Cinematography: S. Gopal Reddy – Sri Ramadasu

== Special awards ==
Lifetime Achievement: P. Susheela; Krishnam Raju	Filmfare Award for Best Male Debut – South: Ram Pothineni – Devadasu	Filmfare Award for Best Female Debut – South: Ileana D'Cruz – Devadasu	Filmfare Special Award – South: Mammootty; Chiranjeevi
