= Dattha =

Datta
- VCD cover
- Directed by: Chi Guru Dutt
- Written by: Janardhana Maharshi
- Dialogues by: M S Ramesh; R Rajashekhar
- Produced by: Chi Guru Dutt
- Starring: Darshan; Ramya; Keerthi Chawla
- Cinematography: Ramesh Babu
- Edited by: Deepu S Kumar
- Music by: R. P. Patnaik
- Production company: Udayaravi Cinemaz
- Release date: 8 June 2006
- Running time: 146 minutes
- Country: India
- Language: Kannada

Dattha is a 2006 Indian Kannada-language comedy drama film directed by Chi Guru Dutt and written by Janardhana Maharshi. The film stars Darshan and Ramya whilst Keerthi Chawla, Srinath, and Vinaya Prasad play other pivotal roles.

The film featured an original score and soundtrack composed by R. P. Patnaik. It received an average response from both critics and the audience. A few comedy sequences were based on the 2003 Telugu movie, Maa Alludu Very Good, for which dialogues were penned by the story writer, Janardhana Maharshi.

== Plot ==
Datta and his friend, Tingu, are small-time crooks. They get in the wrong books of drug peddler, Basha. During one of their thefts, Datta sees Ramya and falls for her. In order to woo her, he returns what has been stolen from her house, pretends to be a well-educated person, and also acts as a SI. However, she finds out and breaks up with him, insulting him in the process.

Later, Datta is persuaded by a businessman Shanti Veerappa who requests him to act as his son Raju, so that his wife, Meenakshi, would recover from a bedridden sickness. However, Shanti Veerappa plots to eliminate Datta. Once his rivals finish Datta who is acting as his son, he can bring back Raju and be assured of his safety.

Datta, not knowing Shanti Veerappa's ploy, goes out along with Shanti Veerappa's family to his village, but is surprised that he is being constantly followed and attacked by Mallikarjuna's goons who he feels are henchmen of Basha. Ramya, who is the daughter of Shanti Veerappa's rival, also tries to eliminate Datta, thinking that he is Raju, but realizes her mistake and reconciles with him. Datta manages to stop Mallikarjuna and Shanti Veerappa's enmity. The families apologize to each other and accept Datta.

== Cast ==
- Darshan as Dattha
- Ramya
- Keerthi Chawla
- Komal as Tingu
- Srinath as Shanti Veerapa
- Avinash
- Vinaya Prakash
- Chitra Shenoy
- Bullet Prakash as Gandhinagar Ghouse
- Besant Ravi as Henchman
- Rajashekhar Kotian as Baasha Bhai
- Shanthamma
- Preethi Rao
- Vatara Mallesh
- Vishwas Bharadwaj
- Dr. Nagesh Kaveti
- O. A. K. Sundar
- M. N. Suresh
- Mohan Juneja as Police Officer
- Vaijanath Biradar

== Production ==
The film was launched at Nandi Theertha Devasthana at Malleswaram.

== Soundtrack ==
The music was composed by R. P. Patnaik. A part of the song "Valamenukkum" from Chithiram Pesuthadi was reused in "Baare Baare".

Track listing
No.	Title	Lyrics	Singer(s)	Length
1.	"Escape Mamu"	V. Nagendra Prasad	Karthik
2.	"Manasa Manasa"	K. Kalyan	Kunal Ganjawala, Shreya Ghoshal
3.	"Ee Soundaryakke"	K. Kalyan	Kunal Ganjawala, Nanditha
4.	"Kannige Kaanisuva"	K. Kalyan	Madhu Balakrishnan
5.	"Baare Baare"	V. Nagendra Prasad	Shankar Mahadevan, Malathi

== Reception ==
R. G. Vijayasarathy from Rediff.com wrote that "All in all, an above average effort". A critic from Chitraloka.com wrote that "This is a good entertainer and worth your money". Deccan Herald wrote "Debutante director Gurudatt’s Datta is an action packed entertainer. Catchy dialogues, rib tickling comedy, sentiment and beautiful picturisation in foreign locales make it watchable".
