= Namma Basava =

- Promotional Poster
- Directed by: Veera Shankar
- Written by: B. A. Madhu; Tushar Ranganath (dialogues)
- Screenplay by: Veera Shankar
- Story by: Veera Shankar
- Produced by: M. Sathya Kiran; A. Santosh Reddy
- Starring: Puneeth Rajkumar; Gowri Munjal
- Cinematography: K. Dattu
- Edited by: S. Manohar
- Music by: Gurukiran
- Production company: V. R. Creations
- Distributed by: Ramu Enterprises
- Release date: 9 September 2005
- Running time: 158 minutes
- Country: India
- Language: Kannada

Namma Basava is a 2005 Indian Kannada-language romantic action film directed by Veera Shankar in his Kannada debut. It stars Puneeth Rajkumar and Gowri Munjal (in her debut) in the lead roles. Avinash, Sudha Rani, Kota Srinivasa Rao, Riyaz Khan and M. N. Lakshmi Devi feature in supporting roles. Gurukiran scored music for the film's background and soundtrack.

Although the film saw an average performance commercially, it completed a 100-day run in 25 centers across Karnataka. While critics gave it mixed reviews, the film's soundtrack album was generally received well. Hindustan Times rated its soundtrack album the fifth best in Kannada films of 2005.

== Plot ==
Basava runs a gym and lives with his brother and sister-in-law, who treat him as their own son. He is permanently opposed by competitors. When his brother starts seeking a girl to be his bride, he opines that he should select his future bride himself. He selects Gowri, the daughter of an auditor who is working with Pampapathy. Pampapathy's son is the Home Minister of the State and a vagabond womanizer. To gain Gowri's approval, Basava makes every effort, but before he can get her approval, her engagement is fixed with Pampathy's son. Supported by Gowri's peppy and naughty grandmother, Basava rises against the autocratic behaviour of Pampapathy, challenges him in public, and wins, thereby also winning the heart and hand of Gowri.

== Cast ==
- Puneeth Rajkumar as Basava
- Gowri Munjal as Gowri
- Sumithra as Girija, Basava's mother
- Mukesh Rishi as ACP Dhanraj, Basava's father
- Avinash as Paramashiva Murthy, Basava's brother, a traffic cop
- Sudha Rani as Geetha, Basava's sister-in-law
- Sharan as Sharan, Basava's friend
- Riyaz Khan as Jr Pampapathi
- M. N. Lakshmi Devi as Parimala, Gowri's grandmother
- K. Vishwanath as Rangaswamy, Gowri's grandfather
- Chithra Shenoy as Janaki, Gowri's mother
- Srinivasa Murthy as Narasimha, Gowri's father
- Kota Srinivasa Rao as Pampathy
- Taranga Vishwa
- Honnavalli Sreekanth
- Mandya Jayaram
- Girish Rao
- Ashok
- Tara
- Sathyajith
- Amulya

== Soundtrack ==
Namma Basava

Soundtrack album by Gurukiran
- Released: 24 May 2005
- Recorded: 2005
- Genre: Feature film soundtrack
- Length: 26:20
- Label: Ashwini Audio
External audio
- Official Audio Jukebox on YouTube

Gurukiran scored the film's background music and composed its soundtrack, lyrics for which was penned by Kaviraj, V. Manohar, Bhangi Ranga and K. Kalyan. The soundtrack album consists of six tracks. The tracks "Rukku Rukku Rukkamma" and "Myna Kooge" featured lyrics in more than one language including Kannada.

Track listing
| No. | Title | Lyrics | Singer(s) | Length |
|---|---|---|---|---|
| 1. | "Allolla Kallolla" | Kaviraj | Gurukiran, Kavita Krishnamurthy | 4:51 |
| 2. | "Andondithu Kaala" | V. Manohar | Udit Narayan | 4:26 |
| 3. | "Mina Mina" | V. Manohar | Chaitra H. G. | 3:08 |
| 4. | "Rukku Rukku Rukkamma" | Bangiranga | Puneeth Rajkumar | 4:37 |
| 5. | "Serithu Mana" | K. Kalyan | Sonu Nigam, Shreya Ghoshal | 4:57 |
| 6. | "Myna Kooge" | Kaviraj | Sukhwinder Singh, Sunitha S. Murali | 4:21 |
| Total length: | | | | 26:20 |

== Reception ==
Film critic R. G. Vijayasarathy of Rediff.com gave the film a positive review and opined that "despite the clichéd story, the ... movie manages to engage the viewer's attention, thanks to the fast pace of the film." He felt the film's plot resembled that of Thunta, another Kannada film that was released earlier in 2005, but "the director manages to get the right masala mix to serve up an entertaining film." He added, "Puneet excels as the action hero. Gowri, in her debut Kannada film, ... is just ordinary in the acting department but looks good in the song sequences. Kota Srinivasa Rao, Sudharani and Tara prove that they are perfect choices for the characters that portray. Dattu's photography, songs and fights are top class, but Guru Kiran's music does not rise to the expectations." B. S. Srivani of Deccan Herald gave a mixed review and wrote, "Puneeth has grown in confidence with each film. His dialogue delivery though, needs some help. Gauri looks pretty. Sudharani and Avinash are good. One can't fathom why Tara chose to play such a minuscule role." Of other departments in the film, she commented, "What captures one's attention is the sets erected by art director Arun Sagar. Gurukiran seems to be inspired to give his best whenever he provides the musical score for a Puneeth movie. But one of the tunes, a straight lift from a Telugu film is like a fly in the soup." She concluded praising the stunt sequences in the film while adding that it reminded her of the stunts in Mission: Impossible 2. Viggy.com felt that "loudness of a 'typical' Telugu film reflects throughout" the film. The reviewer wrote praises of the acting performances of the lead pair, the music, cinematography, and the art direction and stunts. Sify wrote "Debutant director Veerashanker has done a decent job with Namma Basava with 'Power star' Puneeth Rajkumar, new girl Gauri with veteran Telugu actor Kota Srinivasa Rao as the main villain. Puneeth has scored in stunt scenes but has to go miles in acting".
