= Abhimanyu (2003 film) =

- Official poster
- Directed by: A. Mallikarjun
- Written by: Chintapally Ramana (dialogues)
- Story by: Dinesh Baboo
- Based on: Abhi (Kannada)
- Produced by: Ashwini Dutt
- Starring: Kalyan Ram; Ramya; Suhasini Mani Ratnam; Pawan Malhotra
- Cinematography: V. Srinivasa Reddy
- Edited by: Marthand K. Venkatesh
- Music by: Mani Sharma
- Production company: Sri Rock Line Movies
- Distributed by: Sri Rock Line Movies
- Release date: 12 November 2003
- Country: India
- Language: Telugu

Abhimanyu is a 2003 Indian Telugu film directed by A. Mallikarjun and produced by Aswini Dutt. The film stars Kalyan Ram, Ramya (in her Telugu debut), Suhasini Mani Ratnam and Pawan Malhotra in lead roles. The film had musical score by Mani Sharma. The film was a remake of Kannada film Abhi (2003), which also starred Ramya.

== Plot ==
Abhimanyu 'Abhi' (Kalyan Ram) is a cool guy who is good at cultural activities. Saira Bhanu's (Ramya) family approaches Abhi's family in search of a rental house. In the beginning, there is hatred between them, but then they start to know each other. As Bhanu is a Muslim and Abhi is a Hindu, Bhanu's father does not agree for this and he eventually comes in search of Bhanu's lover to thrash him. Abhi does not agree with her father's behavior. In college they start to fight with each other. Bhanu comes to stop them and tells that he's her father. Bhanu's father vacates the house and they all leave for Kurnool. Abhi with his friends goes in search of Bhanu in Kurnool. Somehow Abhi manages to talk with bhanu as their family does not know that he was the lover. Abhi and Bhanu hug in front of their family, then they will come to know that those two were lovers. The old lady(Sowcar Janaki) in Bhanu's house advises Abhi to leave the house immediately as the men from that house will be coming from mosque after the prayer. But Abhi asks why should he be scared of them, the old lady tells him that they will try to kill you. Abhi asks why and the old lady says that ask your mother. Abhi goes back to Hyderabad and asks his mother(Suhasini Mani Ratnam) about that matter what that old lady told. Abhi's mother tells him a flashback story about his real parents who has done interreligious marriage against their parents will and his mom's father and brother now Bhanu's father assassinates them for their families honour. She reveals that she was not his real mother and she adopted him after knowing this situation through his brother who is an investigation officer of that case and since she was physically handicapped and was not able to get married and become a mother. At the same time Bhanu hears the same story from her grandma and she got to know that her grandfather and father has been arrested and punished of sentence of life in the jail later her grandfather was dead in the jail later her father has completed his sentence and became vigorous orthodox Musilim. After some days Bhanu decides to give up her love for her family's sake and she leaves Karnool and goes to Hyderabad to tell this to him. He also agrees with her. But Bhanu's father thinks that she ran away to marry Abhi and he tries to kill him. Then there will be fight between Abhi and Bhanu's father. The old lady advises Bhanu's father to stop his cruelty. He realizes his mistake and allows Bhanu to marry Abhi.

== Cast ==
- Kalyan Ram as Abhimanyu
- Ramya as Sairabanu
- Suhasini Maniratnam as Janaki
- Pawan Malhotra as Jaleel Khan
- Ali as Ali, Bhanu's maternal uncle
- Venu Madhav as Venu, Abhi's friend
- Telangana Shakuntala as Savitri, Janaki's personal maid
- Banerjee
- Raghunatha Reddy
- Sowcar Janaki as Bhanu's grandmother
- Chatrapathi Sekhar as Abhi's friend
- Rajitha

== Production ==
A couple of songs were shot in Switzerland.

== Soundtrack ==
The music was composed by Mani Sharma and released by Aditya Music. All songs were written by Chandrabose.

Abhimanyu

Soundtrack album by Mani Sharma
- Released: 24 October 2003
- Recorded: 2003
- Genre: Soundtrack
- Length: 29:54
- Label: Aditya Music
- Producer: Mani Sharma

Mani Sharma chronology
Ori Nee Prema Bangaram Ganu (2003)	Abhimanyu (2003)	Lakshmi Narasimha (2004)

Track list
No.	Title	Singer(s)	Length
1.	"Gannu Pattithe"	Karthik	4:51
2.	"Nee Manasento Telusu"	Mallikarjun, Gopika Poornima	5:22
3.	"TV Lantidera"	Harini, Tippu	4:46
4.	"Prapanchame"	Kalpana, Vijay Yesudas	5:09
5.	"Chinnavallamanasu"	Unni Krishnan	4:54
6.	"Kola Koloyamma"	Sujatha, Udit Narayan	4:52
Total length:			29:54

== Reception ==
A critic from Sify wrote, "This campus love story that peters out to be an action film in the second half is very similar to Junior NTR’s Student No. 1 especially when the hero’s mother encourages her son to fight and win back the girl. Director Mallikharjuna - a protégé of Puri Jagannadh has done his homework well and his idea seems to give hero Kalyan Ram a larger-than-life image". Jhansi of Telugu Cinema wrote "The director of the film took all the care in characters, music lyrics etc, but definitely neglected the soul of the film that is the strong story line. This is the negative aspect of the film".
