= Bombaat =

- Poster
- Directed by: D. Rajendra Babu
- Screenplay by: D. Rajendra Babu
- Story by: Janardhana Maharshi
- Produced by: Rockline Venkatesh
- Starring: Ganesh; Ramya
- Cinematography: Shekhar Chandru
- Edited by: T. Shashikumar
- Music by: Mano Murthy
- Production company: Rockline Productions
- Release date: 8 August 2008
- Country: India
- Language: Kannada

Bombaat ( transl. Superb) is a 2008 Indian Kannada-language action comedy film directed by D. Rajendra Babu. The film stars Ganesh and Ramya. It follows Anand, a fearless young man with a troubled past who frequently clashes with criminals and wrongdoers in Bangalore. His life takes a turn after he becomes involved with Shalini, the daughter of the city's police commissioner, leading him into conflict with a powerful underworld gang.

The film was produced by Rockline Venkatesh under the banner Rockline Productions. The music for the film was scored by Mano Murthy. Upon theatrical release on 8 August 2008, the film opened to generally negative reviews from critics. The plot was criticized to be a hotchpotch of Telugu films such as Dhana 51 (2005), Dhee (2007) and Aata (2007). The film also failed to perform commercially.

== Plot ==
Shalini returns to Bangalore after completing her MBA from a university in Austria and is welcomed home by her father Ananthakrishnan, the city's police commissioner. On her way home, she witnesses a man assaulting a participant in an Ayyappa procession, only to discover that the victim had been smuggling explosives disguised within the offerings carried by devotees. Disturbed by the growing hooliganism in Bangalore and angered by the police's inability to control it, Shalini expresses her desire to return to Austria. To reassure her, Ananthakrishnan arranges for the same man, Anand, to be temporarily shown as being in police custody, leading Shalini to believe he has been arrested.

Anand lives with his friends and cares deeply for his aged mother, who wishes to see him become a police officer. Meanwhile, Bangalore's underworld is controlled by mafia leader Gajendra along with his brother Das and associate Guru, who are involved in smuggling, extortion and trafficking. Gajendra's son Adi Shankar becomes infatuated with Shalini after seeing her at a party, but his inappropriate behaviour results in Shalini publicly humiliating him. Enraged, Gajendra initially orders her murder, but Guru instead proposes marrying Adi Shankar to her in order to establish ties with the police. Subsequently, Gajendra and his men forcibly finalize the marriage alliance through a traditional tambula ceremony conducted at Ananthakrishnan's house. Unable to oppose the gang openly, the commissioner secretly entrusts Shalini's safety to Anand, much to Shalini's amusement.

Anand shelters Shalini at his residence and cleverly convinces Gajendra that forcing her into marriage immediately may endanger Adi Shankar. Claiming that he can gradually persuade her to accept the alliance willingly, Anand gains the gang's trust, with Das being assigned to monitor him. Anand and his friends then manipulate Das into believing that Gajendra has denied him a rightful share in the gang's wealth and property. Their repeated provocations create distrust between the brothers, eventually escalating into violent conflict between their factions at a stone quarry, resulting in several deaths. Believing the gang has weakened, the police begin operations against them, but Guru escapes from custody with the help of an insider and reveals Anand's role in turning the brothers against one another.

Anand later reveals to Shalini that his father had once been a feared rowdy who exploited the public before being murdered by his own associates. Ashamed of his father's past, Anand had promised his mother that he would become a police officer, but his application was rejected because of his family background. He explains that, despite this, he has secretly been assisting Commissioner Ananthakrishnan by targeting criminals. Following the success of his operations against Gajendra's gang, Anand is finally appointed as a sub-inspector, fulfilling his mother's long-cherished wish. When Gajendra and his men arrive to reclaim Shalini, Anand single-handedly fights and defeats the gang before proudly saluting his mother in police uniform.

== Cast ==
- Ganesh as Anand
- Ramya as Shalini
- Mukesh Rishi as Gajendra
- Rahul Dev as Das
- Adi Lokesh as Adi Shankar
- Chi. Guru Dutt as Guru
- Avinash as Commissioner Ananthakrishnan
- Shobaraj as Anand's father
- Vinaya Prasad as Anand's mother
- Shanthamma as a vegetable vendor
- Ashok Rao as Director general of police
- R. G. Vijayasarathy as driver
- Petrol Prasanna as an Ayyappa devotee
- Sadashiva Brahmavar as gardener
- K. V. Manjaiah as priest
- Shille Manjunath as beggar kid

== Production ==
"There is lot of hardwork from me. It is a new kind of cinema for me. I have lost eight kilos especially for the second half."

— Ganesh on the film, 2008

Ganesh worked out to play a tough guy in the film. Ramya was cast as a non-resident Indian. The songs were shot in Germany, Switzerland, Austria and Italy. Ramya shot for this film at the same time as the unreleased Bhimoo's Bang Bang Kids and Mussanje Maathu. Ganesh got injured while doing the splits. Shooting finished in March 2008.

== Soundtrack ==
The music of Bombaat was composed by Mano Murthy who previously worked with Ganesh in Mungaru Male and Cheluvina Chittara. Lyrics were by Jayanth Kaikini and Kaviraj. Bangalore Mirror opined that "Amid high expectations from Mano, for a Ganesh starrer, Bombaat’s soundtrack just about manages to stay afloat.

No.	Title	Lyrics	Singer(s)	Length
1.	"Maathinalli Helalaarenu" (male)	Jayanth Kaikini	Sonu Nigam	5:22
2.	"Strawberry Kenne"	Kaviraj	Rajesh Krishnan, Supriya Ramakrishnayya	5:03
3.	"I Am So Bombaat" (title track)	Kaviraj	Gurukiran	4:11
4.	"Maathinalli Helalaarenu" (female)	Jayanth Kaikini	Shreya Ghoshal	5:09
5.	"Chinna Hele Hegiruve"	Jayanth Kaikini	Sonu Nigam, Shreya Ghoshal	5:12

== Release and reception ==
Bombaat was released around the same time as Ramya-starrer Anthu Inthu Preethi Banthu. A critic from Sify called the story "water thin" and opined that "Added to it is the mother sentiment plus Mano Murthy’s rehashed tunes from his earlier films, makes it messy." R G Vijayasarathy of Rediff.com gave the film a rating of two out of five stars and opined that "All this might just appeal to Ganesh's fans despite the poor script". Deccan Herald said, "Bombaat is better left alone for a quickest burial at the boxoffice and one’s money better spent at bhel-puris, badushahs, chais, cappuccinos, and Cafe au Laits than let Bombaat make bheja-fry of you brains and mincemeat of your mindspace". The audience criticised Ganesh's characterisation. Rajendra Babu cast Ramya in Aryan (2014) after he liked her performance in this film.

== Box office ==
The initial collections were high, but the film later became a box office failure after the collections dipped. The film flopped along with Ramya's Anthu Inthu Preethi Banthu.
