= Paramesha Panwala =

2008 film by Mahesh Babu

- movie poster
- Directed by: Mahesh Babu
- Screenplay by: Mahesh Babu
- Story by: Janardhana Maharshi
- Produced by: Aditya Babu
- Starring: Shiva Rajkumar; Surveen Chawla; Sonu
- Cinematography: Venus Moorthy
- Edited by: M Verman
- Music by: V. Harikrishna
- Production company: Adithya Arts MCL
- Release date: 5 December 2008
- Country: India
- Language: Kannada

Paramesha Panwala is a 2008 Kannada-language film directed by Mahesh Babu, and produced by Aditya Babu, whilst the music was composed by V. Harikrishna. The film stars Shiva Rajkumar and Surveen Chawla in her debut as actress. It was released nationwide on 5 December 2008. The movie was criticized to be a hotchpotch of 2 Kannada films – Bombaat and Bindaas which were also penned by Janardhana Maharshi and themselves criticized to be based on Telugu movies.

== Synopsis ==
Paramesha dearly loves his sister and would turn the world upside down for her happiness. When a local gangster vows to kill his sister's husband, Paramesha is willing to stop him at all costs.

== Cast ==
- Shiva Rajkumar as Paramesha
- Surveen Chawla as Shruti
- Sonu
- Srinivasa Murthy
- Ashish Vidyarthi as Don
- Chitra Shenoy
- Akul Balaji
- Rekha
- Sadhu Kokila
- Sharan
- Vidya Murthy

== Music ==
The film has five songs composed by V. Harikrishna with the lyrics written by V. Nagendra Prasad and Kaviraj.

Paramesha Panwala

Studio album by V. Harikrishna
- Released: 10 November 2008
- Genre: Feature film soundtrack
- Length: 24:53
- Label: Ashwini Audio
- Producer: Aditya Babu

No.	Title	Lyrics	Singer(s)	Length
1.	"Dil Dhadak Dhadak"	V. Nagendra Prasad	Sonu Nigam, Anuradha Bhat	5:14
2.	"Saavira Saavira Janma"	Kaviraj	Kunal Ganjawala, Shravya	4:25
3.	"Sum Sumke"	V. Nagendra Prasad	S. P. Balasubrahmanyam, Shamita Malnad	4:54
4.	"Madaraasu Aisa"	V. Nagendra Prasad	Shankar Mahadevan	5:38
5.	"Tuntaraama Puttaraama"	V. Nagendra Prasad	Udit Narayan, K. S. Chithra	4:42

== Reception ==
This movie did not fare well at the box office.

=== Critical response ===
R. G. Vijayasarathy of Rediff.com scored the film at 2.5 out of 5 stars and wrote "Shivaraj Kumar is lively and dances very well in the film. But it is Rao and Sadhu who walk away with the honours. The film's other comedian Sharan has limited scope. Heroine Surveen Chawla looks good in dance sequences. Ashish Vidyarthi, as the villain, is monotonous. PP is sans logic but is still an enjoyable fare".
