= Chi. Guru Dutt =

Indian actor and director

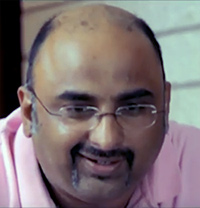
- Guru Dutt (Indian actor and director), in Bharath Stores, 2012 Indian Kannada film
- Born: 11 August 1965 (age 61); Vijayanagar(AP)
- Occupations: Actor, producer, director
- Years active: 1986–present

Chitnahalli Guru Dutt (born 11 August 1965) is an Indian actor primarily concentrating on Kannada films alongside a few Tamil films. He is the son of Chi. Udaya Shankar.

== Career ==
He made his debut along with Shivrajkumar in the Kannada film Anand (1986). He was launched in Tamil by K. Balachander with Pudhu Pudhu Arthangal (1989). His major Tamil appearance was in the thriller film Kalaignan (1993) opposite Kamal Haasan as the psychopath doctor. He has acted in about 100 films directed 4 and produced 3.

Chi Guru Dutt has also directed Aryan starring Shivarajkumar, Ramya and Sarath Babu.

== Filmography ==
=== Actor ===
Kannada

- Anand (1986)
- Samyuktha (1988)
- Inspector Vikram (1989)
- Kitturina Huli (1991)
- Aralida Hoovugalu (1991)
- Halli Rambhe Belli Bombe (1991)
- Belli Kalungura (1992)
- Nagaradalli Nayakaru (1992)
- Mannina Doni (1992)
- Jeevana Chaitra (1992)
- Ananda Jyothi (1993)
- Chirabandhavya (1993)
- Jaga Mechida Huduga (1993)
- Kalavida (1997)
- Goonda Matthu Police (1998)
- Shabdavedhi (2000)
- Soorappa (2000)
- Usire (2001)
- Kotigobba (2001)
- Raja Narasimha (2003)
- Kadamba (2004)
- Nija (2004)
- Magic Ajji (2005)
- Uppi Dada M.B.B.S. (2006)
- Bombaat (2008)
- Jeeva (2009)
- Circus (2009)
- Mukhaputa (2009)
- Minugu (2010)
- Shankar IPS (2010)
- Vinayaka Geleyara Balaga (2011)
- Edegarike(2012)
- Bharath Stores (2012)
- Shiva (2012)
- Breaking News (2012)
- Whistle (2013)
- Belli (2014)
- ...Re (2016)
- Mass Leader(2017)
- Srikanta (2017)
- Chakravarthy (2017)
- Gimmick (2019)
- Yuvarathnaa (2021)
- Mother Promise (2026)

Tamil

- Pudhu Pudhu Arthangal (1989)
- Varavu Nalla Uravu (1990)
- Ennarukil Nee Irunthal (1991)
- Kalaignan (1993)
- En Uyir Nee Thaane (1998)
- Ponnu Veetukkaran (1999)
- Appu (2000)

=== Director ===
- Samara (1995)
- Dattha (2006)
- Kaamannana Makkalu (2008)
- Kiccha Huccha (2010)
- Aryan (2014)

== Television ==
| Year | Serial | Channel | Notes |
|---|---|---|---|
| 2002 | Tulasi | Udaya TV | Producer |
| 2017 | Sanju Mattu Naanu | Colors Kannada | |
| 2022–2024 | Ramachari | Colors Kannada | |
| 2022–2024 | Janani | Udaya TV | Producer |
| 2023 | Shrirasthu Shubhamasthu | Zee Kannada | |
| 2025–Present | Sindhu Bhairavi | Udaya TV | |
