= Laali =

- VCD cover
- Directed by: Dinesh Babu
- Written by: Dinesh Babu
- Produced by: Rockline Venkatesh
- Starring: Vishnuvardhan; Shanthi Krishna; Mohini; Harish
- Cinematography: P. K. H. Das
- Edited by: Suresh Urs
- Music by: V. Manohar
- Production company: Rockline Productions
- Release date: 1997
- Running time: 139 minutes
- Country: India
- Language: Kannada

Laali (transl. Lullaby) is a 1997 Indian Kannada-language drama film directed, written and scripted by Dinesh Babu, starring Vishnuvardhan, Mohini and Shanthi Krishna in lead roles. The film explored the bond between a father and daughter.

The film was critically acclaimed upon release and won laurels at the Karnataka State Film Awards. It won the Second Best Film award and Vishnuvardhan was awarded the Karnataka State Film Award for Best Actor for the year 1997.

== Plot ==
Krishna is a well known architect. His only love is his daughter Anju and his life is filled with joy and happiness. Anju falls in love with Harish and her father is also happy with this. The film takes a twist when Anju begins to find a perfect bride for her lonely father and she finds her professor Shanthi as a suitable wife for Krishna. She invites the professor home and upon seeing Shanthi, Krishna is shocked. Later it is revealed that Shanthi is Krishna's wife and he had left her and her family because of Anju, and that Anju is not his real daughter. He found her lying on the footpath and brought her home, which led to the couple's separation. Now that Anju knows the truth, she brings Shanthi home and calls her mother, much to the chagrin of Krishna. He feels that she is stealing his daughter from him and gets stressed out. Harish feels that he is stressed, needs psychiatric help and calls him home. But the situation goes wrong and Anju tells them to leave her father alone and throws them out of their home. Later, knowing her mistake, she calls her mother back, but in vain. So she writes a letter and leaves the house. Krishna tries to find her everywhere, but fails. He comes back, but he sees Anju back home too. She tells him that she will never leave him again. Krishna feels he punished Shanthi too much and calls her back. The film ends with all of them united together.

== Cast ==
- Vishnuvardhan as Krishna Kumar
- Mohini as Anju
- Harish
- Shanthi Krishna
- Vinaya Prasad in guest appearance
- Ramakrishna
- C. R. Simha
- Vinayak Joshi
- Jyothi

== Production ==
The film was launched at a stonehouse at Hesaraghatta where Baboo's previous directional venture Amruthavarshini (1997) was shot.

== Soundtrack ==
The music of the film was composed by V. Manohar and lyrics written by K. Kalyan.

Laali

Soundtrack album by V. Manohar
- Released: 1997
- Genre: Feature film soundtrack
- Label: Akash Audio

No.	Title	Lyrics	Singer(s)	Length
1.	"Chandana Kampa Laali"	K. Kalyan	Rajesh Krishnan
2.	"Ee Male"	K. Kalyan	K. S. Chithra
3.	"Maya Maya"	K. Kalyan	Rajesh Krishnan, K. S. Chithra
4.	"Suvvi Suvvi Saviyaada"	K. Kalyan	Rajesh Krishnan, K. S. Chithra
5.	"Chandana Kampa Laali"	K. Kalyan	K. S. Chithra
6.	"Baagale Illade"	K. Kalyan	Rajesh Krishnan, K. S. Chithra

== External sources ==
- Laali at IMDb
