= Aditya Babu =

Indian film producer and actor

Aditya Babu is an Indian producer and actor, who works in Telugu and Kannada films.

== Career ==
Aditya Babu was interested in acting since childhood. He went on to become an actor and also got into film production to nurture his skills and fulfil his passion to succeed as a filmmaker. He debuted as hero in a Kannada movie titled Anthu Inthu Preethi Banthu, directed by Veera Shankar co-starring Ramya. His first Telugu film as an actor was Chalaki.

== Filmography ==
=== As producer ===
Year	Films	Language	Ref.
2007	Jagadam	Telugu	
2008	Anthu Inthu Preethi Banthu	Kannada	
2008	Paramesha Panwala	Kannada	
2009	Arya 2	Telugu	
2009	Raam	Kannada	
2010	Chalaki	Telugu	

=== As actor ===
Year	Films	Role	Language	Ref.
2008	Anthu Inthu Preethi Banthu	Shivu	Kannada	
2010	Chalaki	Subba Rao	Telugu	
