= Kanakambari (film) =

- VCD cover
- Directed by: Dinesh Baboo
- Written by: Dinesh Baboo
- Produced by: S. Shailendra Babu
- Starring: Anu Prabhakar; Vijayalakshmi; Kumar Govind; Jyothi Krishna; Aryan Prasad
- Cinematography: Dinesh Baboo
- Edited by: B. S. Kemparaj
- Music by: Praveen D. Rao
- Production company: Shailendra Productions
- Release date: 4 June 2004
- Country: India
- Language: Kannada

Kanakambari is a 2004 Indian Kannada-language horror thriller film directed by Dinesh Baboo starring Anu Prabhakar, Vijayalakshmi, Kumar Govind, Jyothi Krishna and Aryan Prasad.

== Plot ==
Nitya and her friends go on a picnic. Out of boredom, Nitya and her friends decide to play the Ouija. Nitya suggests to call someone random - Nirmala Devi. They quit that game abruptly and join their other friends near the campfire. Some boys whom they met that day, intoxicate Nitya without her knowledge. When one of them try to misuse this opportunity, a ghost kills him. Nobody knows the cause of the death.

After returning to Bengaluru, Nitya asks her lover Ramesh to take her to her warden's relatives house - Kanakambari in Hassan. On their way, a man tries to misbehave with Nitya. There we find that Nitya is possessed by some spirit and that makes the man to vomit blood and die. Upon reaching the Kanakambari, Nitya faints and after recovering tells that she has to return to Bengaluru immediately.

In the Kanakambari we find Shanti who failed to give a male heir to Raghava's family. Due to this Raghava's mother and uncle decide to get Raghava remarried in hope of a male heir. After the marriage Shanti will be sent to her parents' house which she does not want. Later strange things begin in their house. Shanti is also possessed by Nirmala Devi's spirit. The family try to seek the help of priests.

In Bengaluru, Ramesh finds strange things happening around Nitya and decides to consult a priest. When he takes Nitya to the priest, both of them discover that Nitya has been possessed by Nirmala Devi. Nirmala Devi reveals that Nitya is her own daughter. Nirmala Devi also reveals that she was the wife of Raghava. His family always wanted a male heir to preserve their family prestige and Raghava would not talk against his elders. After giving birth to Nitya, Nirmala Devi was told that the child was stillborn. But she hears the child cry from across the room while it was being taken away to be killed. Nirmala Devi tries to stop it but accidentally dies.

After listening to the story, Ramesh, Nitya and the priest realize that Nirmala Devi has gone. The priest tells that Nirmala Devi has gone to kill the family in the Kanakambari. Nirmala Devi kills Raghava's mother and uncle. When she was about to kill Raghava, Nitya stops her. She tells that she found her family after a long time and does not want to lose her father now. Upon hearing these words, Nirmala Devi spares Raghava's life and warns him to take good care of their daughter. She tells Shanti to be Nitya's mother henceforth. A light goes outside the room suggesting the departure of Nirmala Devi's soul.

== Cast ==
- Anu Prabhakar as Shanti
- Vijayalakshmi as Nirmala Devi
- Kumar Govind as Raghava
- H. G. Dattatreya as a priest
- Mandeep Roy as Sub Inspector
- Enagi Nataraj
- Jyothi Krishna as Nitya
- Aryan Prasad as Ramesh
- Om Prakash Rao as Constable Krishna
- Chitra Shenoy as Krishna's wife
- Mandya Ramesh as Vasu
- Bank Janardhan as Chikka
- Sathyajith as Raghava's uncle

== Production ==
It was the second digital film shot in high-definition in Kannada, and the first to be released. The first being Dinesh Baboo's Magic Ajji (2004).

== Reception ==
A critic from Sify wrote that "Is Director Dinesh Baboo not aware that knowing the gender of a child is a crime? however he has experimented with high definition camera and the night scenes using camera tricks looks natural". A critic from Viggy wrote that "Don't expect chilling horror nor nail biting suspense unlike in Hollywood horror movies. There are no scenes that increase your blood pressure. Still you wont feel bored. Thanks to Dinesh Baboo's brisk narration". Deccan Herald wrote "The story moves slowly in the first part and fails to create the suspense effectively. In the second half, we are told about Nirmala, her family and how her spirit wants to take revenge. The climax, with a sentimental touch, is unexpected. There are some special effects but they do not add value to the movie". The film became a disaster at box-office.
