= Enagi Nataraj =

Indian actor

- Enagi Nataraj
- Died: 9 June 2012 (aged 54); Hubballi, Karnataka, India
- Occupation: Actor
- Father: Enagi Balappa

Enagi Nataraj was an Indian actor of film, television and stage. He was a son of actor Enagi Balappa.

== Early life ==
Nataraj was born to the couple Enagi Balappa and Laxmidevi. He made his first appearance as a child in the play Basaveshwara Mahatme. He was a student of the Rudrakshi Math's hostel in Belagavi. Nataraj worked in business for a small period of time before resuming his entertainment career. For more than a decade, he worked for film director T. S. Nagabharana.

== Filmography ==
=== Serials ===
- Mahanavami
- Sankranti
- Naku Tanti
- Kinnari
- Idu Entha Lokavayya

=== Plays ===
- Basaveshwara Mahatme
- Haddu Needida Haadi
- Nata Samrat
- Jagajyoti Basaveshwara
- Burjwa Gentleman
- Policeriddare Echharike
- Oedipus
- Macbeth
- Miss Sahara
- Tadroopi
- Birudantembara Ganda
- Sambashiva Prahasana
- Naa Tukaram Alla

=== Films ===
- Neela (2001)
- Sainika (2002)
- Abhi (2003)
- Singaravva Mattu Aramane (2003)
- Kanakambari (2004)
- Avva (2008)
- Mathe Mungaru (2010)
- Bheema Theeradalli (2012)
- Savitri (2023)

== Awards and honours ==
- He was a recipient of Karnataka Nataka Academy award.
- He was made as a director after Dharwad Rangayana was made autonomous.

== Final work ==
Before his death, Nataraj had a play in progress about Kittur Rani Chennamma.

== Death ==
Nataraj was suffering from liver- and kidney-related problems and he died at a private nursing home in Hubballi on 9 June 2012 following his illness. He was survived by his wife and two sons.
