= Krishnam =

- Theatrical release poster
- Directed by: Dinesh Baboo
- Written by: Dinesh Baboo
- Story by: P. N. Balaram
- Produced by: P. N. Balaram
- Starring: Akshay Krishnan; Ashwarya Ullas; Mamitha Baiju; Sai Kumar; Shanthi Krishna
- Cinematography: Dinesh Baboo
- Edited by: Abhilash Balachandran
- Music by: Hariprasad R
- Production company: PNB Cinemas
- Distributed by: PNB Cinemas
- Release date: May 18, 2018 (India)
- Country: India
- Languages: Malayalam; Telugu

Krishnam is a 2018 Indian family drama thriller film written, directed and filmed by Dinesh Baboo from a story by P. N. Balaram, who also produced the film. The film features Akshay Krishnan and Aishwarya Ullas with Mamitha Baiju, Sai Kumar, and Shanthi Krishna in important roles. The film was released in India on 18 May 2018.

The film, primarily in Malayalam, was subsequently partially reshot in Telugu titled Dear Krishna with Avinash replacing Sai Kumar, which had a delayed release on 25 January 2025, after seven years of production.

== Cast ==
- Akshay Krishnan as himself
- Hrishikesh as Abhi
- Aishwarya Ullas as Radhika
- Mamitha Baiju as Chithra
- Ankit Harikrishnan as Akshay's friend
- Sai Kumar as Balakrishnan: Akshay's father
- Shanthi Krishna as Akshay's mother
- Sharon Thomas as Akshay's friend
- Renji Panicker as Dr. Sunil
- V. K. Prakash
- Mukundan
- Anjali Nair
- Vineeth Kumar

Telugu version

- Avinash as Balakrishna: Akshay's father
- Sameer as Dr. Sunil

== Production ==
The film was planned as a multilingual film in Malayalam, Telugu and Tamil and although the Tamil version were dropped in favour of a dubbed version. Krishnam is based on a real-life incident that started when Akshay Krishnan from Thrissur faced an accident during a dance contest. He was diagnosed with a hernia during the incident. However, that was not the only issue as his entire stomach cavity and body was filled with water. His kidney, liver, lungs and spleen was damaged. Several overseas doctors couldn't find the root cause of his problem but a doctor from Thrissur checked out his heart and realized that he had a rare heart condition. The film's relationship to Krishnan is that his father is a devotee of Guruvayurappan and after the incident, Akshay Krishnan's devotion in god increased. After shooting was complete for Krishnam, the film was partially reshot in Telugu as Dear Krishna, which began production in 2018.

== Soundtrack ==
The film's music is by Hariprasad R.

Malayalam

1. "Mazha Megham"- Vijay Yesudas
2. "Thoo Manju" - Vineeth Sreenivasan
3. "Madthu Madthu" - Tippu

All lyrics are written by Giri Patla.

Telugu
No.	Title	Singer(s)	Length
1.	"Chiru Prayam"	S. P. Balasubrahmanyam	5:03
2.	"Tholisari Bhadulichinave"	Kaala Bhairava	3:54
3.	"Classullo Patallo"	Kaala Bhairava	3:42

Tamil

- "Oli Sindhum" - Karthik
- "Poruthu Poruthu" - Sathyaprakash
- "Manam Thedum" - Madhu Balakrishnan
- "Vennaipol" - Usha Jayakrishnan

== Release ==
Krishnam was released in India on 18 May 2018 and was released straight online overseas. After a seven year delay, Dear Krishna was released on 24 January 2025.

== Reception ==
Regarding the Tamil dubbed version, which was released in 2019, a critic from News Today wrote, "What is a major eye sore is Krishnam was dramatic towards the end. And the second half was tedious too".

Regarding the Telugu version, Kausalya Rachavelpula of The Hans India gave a rating of 2.75 out of 5 and wrote that, "The emotional performances, gripping narrative, and impactful music make it a memorable watch". Regarding the Telugu version, Sakshi Post also gave the same rating and appreciated the performance of lead cast, and storyline.
