= Vijayaramaraju =

2000 film directed by Veera Shankar Bairisetty

- Directed by: Veera Shankar
- Written by: Posani Krishna Murali
- Produced by: CV Reddy
- Starring: Srihari; B. H. Tarun Kumar; Urvashi
- Cinematography: A. Vijay Kumar
- Edited by: Gautam Raju
- Music by: Vandemataram Srinivas
- Production company: Surottama Creations
- Release date: 23 November 2000
- Running time: 2h 20m
- Country: India
- Language: Telugu

Vijayaramaraju is a 2000 Indian Telugu-language action film directed by Veera Shankar. The film stars Srihari, B. H. Tarun Kumar, and Urvashi in the lead roles. The film had musical score by Vandemataram Srinivas. The film won three Nandi Awards.

== Cast ==
- Srihari as Vijayaramaraju
- B. H. Tarun Kumar as Jabbaraban
- Urvashi as Sirisha
- Ranganath
- Chandra Mohan
- Chalapathi Rao
- Narra Venkateswara Rao
- Kota Srinivasa Rao
- Mallikarjuna Rao
- AVS
- Jayaprakash Reddy as Home Minister
- Mukku Raju
- Jeeva
- Ramaraju
- Tirupathi Prakash
- Chitti Babu
- Kadambari Kiran
- Gautham Raju as a drunkard at the train station
- Ananth
- Rajitha
- Uttej as Malik (uncredited)

== Reception ==
Griddaluru Gopalrao of Zamin Ryot praised the performances of the cast, the writing, and the direction of the patriotic scenes and concluded that the film will impress everyone. A critic from Andhra Online called this film "the male version of Vijaya Santhi's Bharata Ratna" and concluded that the film is similar to Azad.

== Awards ==
Nandi Awards

- Best Audiographer - Madhusudhan Reddy
- Special Jury Award - Srihari
- Female Dubbing Artist - Silpa
