= Nagarahavu (2016 film) =

- Theatrical release poster
- Kannada: ನಾಗರಹಾವು
- Directed by: Kodi Ramakrishna
- Written by: Kodi Ramakrishna
- Produced by: Sajid Qureshi; Sohail Ansari; Dhaval Gada
- Starring: Ramya; Vishnuvardhan; Diganth; Saikumar; Rajesh Vivek
- Cinematography: H. C. Venugopal
- Edited by: Jhony Harsha
- Music by: Gurukiran
- Production companies: Inbox Pictures pvt ltd; Blockbuster Studios; Pen Movies
- Distributed by: Inbox Pictures pvt ltd (Kannada); Sri Thenandal Films (Tamil)
- Release date: 14 October 2016
- Country: India
- Language: Kannada
- Budget: ₹40 crore

Nagarahavu (transl. Cobra) is a 2016 Indian Kannada language epic fantasy film directed by Kodi Ramakrishna, the final film directed by him before his death in 2019, and produced by Sajid Qureshi, Inbox Pictures Pvt Ltd.

With Ramya in the lead role, a digitally recreated CGI version of deceased actor Vishnuvardhan has played the main role, with the film being marketed as his "comeback". Actors Diganth, Saikumar, Rajesh Vivek, and Sadhu Kokila play supporting roles.

The music was composed by Gurukiran with cinematography by H. C. Venugopal and editing by Jhony Harsha. The film has been dubbed and released in Tamil as Shivanagam, Telugu as Nagabharanam, and Hindi as Nagavanshi. The film released on 14 October 2016.

The film was a festive season to fans for having come back of legendary actor Vishnuvardhan through CGI effect.

== Plot ==
Nagarahavu is about a woman transforming into a snake to seek revenge.

The story revolves around an ancient kalasha (divine vessel), a Lord Shiva Monument. On the Soorya Grahan (solar eclipse) day, it collects the strength of the gods and goddesses. A series of attempts have been made by the demons to capture it, but fail in possessing it.

The story then shifts to the present, Nagacharan (Diganth), a talented singer and musician along with his friends wants to win a National Music Competition. It is shown that the kalasha is excavated by the archeologists and becomes the trophy in the music competition. The kalasha is the most wanted thing for baddies led by Mukul Dev, Amit Tiwari, and Ravi Kale. They sent a music troop to win the competition. A girl named Manasa (Ramya) gets close to Nagacharan with the pretext of learning music. Her motives and calculations are different.

Mukul Dev threatens Nagacharan to quit the competition because Nagacharan is the only opposition they have to win the music competition and he refuses to quit. Mukul Dev kills his friends in an accident. In retaliation, Manasa kills Amit Tiwari and Ravi Kale revealing her as an icchadhaari serpent. Nagacharan witnesses it and questions her identity.

Then, Manasa explains her past that in her previous birth she is Naganika (Ramya), daughter of Shivaiyya (Saikumar) who and his forefathers have been saving an ancient Shiva monument for hundreds of years ago. The evil Tantrik, Kapali (Rajesh Vivek), and his forefathers have been fighting with Naganika's family for many years to occupy the Lord Shiva monument. Kapali kills Naganika in a battle to occupy the Shiva monument. A dying Naganika then takes an oath that she will come back to take revenge on Kapali. In the next birth, Naganika takes birth as Manasa, a snake woman to get back the kalasha and protect it.

Nagacharan promises her that he will win the kalasha at any cost. Mukul Dev and Kapali team up and capture Manasa. In the end, she gets help from Lord Shiva himself, who sends his serpent necklace, King Nagaraja (Vishnuvardhan) is a mythical king who comes to her rescue. He releases Manasa from her captivity and they both kill Mukul Dev and Kapali. Nagacharan wins the competition and the pair places the kalasha before the Shiva idol.

== Cast ==
- Ramya as Manasa and Naganika
- Vishnuvardhan as King Nagaraja (created with CGI, special appearance)
- Diganth as Nagacharan
- Saikumar as Shivaiyya
- Rajesh Vivek as Kapali
- Sadhu Kokila as Sadha
- Mukul Dev as Baddie
- Amit Tiwari as Baddie
- Ravi Kale as Baddie
- Rangayana Raghu
- Darshan in a cameo appearance in Nagarahavu Title Song

== Production ==
The film has no relation to the 1972 film of the same name which also starred Vishnuvardhan. It began production in 2013 and was shot in 149 days at Kantirava studio, Lalita Mahal, Mysuru and Ramoji Studios. The visual effects are given by Makuta VFX with over a hundred artists working on the visual effects. Dr. Vishnuvardhan was created through CGI. It nearly took two years to create, and the work was distributed in six countries. Super star Darshan appeared in a cameo for a song which was a tribute to Vishnuvardhan.

== Soundtrack ==
Nagarahavu

Soundtrack album by Gurukiran
- Released: 14 August 2016
- Recorded: 2016
- Genre: Film soundtrack
- Length: 32:10
- Languages: Kannada; Telugu; Tamil
- Label: Sony Music India

Gurukiran chronology
Uppi 2 (2015)	Nagarahavu (2016)	Chowka (2016)

Gurukiran was signed to compose the soundtrack album and background score for the film. The audio was released on 14 August 2016 at a government hospital in Bangalore. A charity event was also planned coinciding the audio launch to the downtrodden hospitalized patients. Initially, it was announced that actress Anushka Shetty would launch the album officially. However, it turned out to be a rumor.

Kannada track listing
No.	Title	Lyrics	Singer(s)	Length
1.	"Aledaado Megha"	Kaviraj	Shankar Mahadevan, Indu Nagaraj	4:58
2.	"Lucky Lakkamma"	Kaviraj	Gurukiran, Sravana Bhargavi	3:38
3.	"Munni Baby"	Kaviraj	Hemachandra, Chaitra H. G.	5:31
4.	"Nagini"	Santhosh Nayak	Sunitha Upadrashta, Divya Raghavan	4:18
5.	"Nodi Nodi"	Kaviraj	Nakash Aziz, Chaitra H. G.	5:01
6.	"Suttha Muttha"	Kaviraj	Kailash Kher	4:55
7.	"Nagarahavu (Title Track)"	Kaviraj	Vijay Prakash	3:49
Total length:				32:10

Tamil track listing
No.	Title	Lyrics	Singer(s)	Length
1.	"Alaindhodum Megham"	Snehan	Dhananjay, Nayana Nair	4:58
2.	"Lucky Penne"	Snehan	K. Saketh, B. Ramya	3:43
3.	"Munni Baby"	Snehan	Revanth, Chaitra	5:01
4.	"Nagini"	Snehan	M. M. Srilekha, Nayana Nair	4:19
5.	"Ettithukkum"	Snehan	Kailash Kher	5:08
6.	"Mummy Daddy"	Snehan	B. Simha	5:01
7.	"Sivanaagam (Title Track)"	Snehan	Saisharan	3:49
Total length:				32:23

Telugu track listing
No.	Title	Lyrics	Singer(s)	Length
1.	"Mummy Daddy"	Srirama Tapaswi	Hanuman	5:01
2.	"Munni Baby"	Srirama Tapaswi	Krishna Chaitanya, Damini CH	5:25
3.	"Siva Sanka Raavvam"	Srirama Tapaswi	Dhanunjay, Sahiti Chaganti	4:58
4.	"Raave Bangaram"	Srirama Tapaswi	Revanth, B. Ramya	3:43
5.	"Nagini"	Srirama Tapaswi	Mohana Bhogaraju, Nayana Nair	4:19
6.	"Vedhamanti Roopanive"	Srirama Tapaswi	Kailash Kher	5:08
7.	"Nagabharanam (Title Track)"	Srirama Tapaswi	Saisharan	3:49
Total length:				32:23

== Release ==
An official teaser for the film was released on 30 May 2016. It became the fastest teaser for a Kannada film to reach 1,000,000 views on YouTube. Film released on 14th Oct 2016 in Kannada, Telugu and Tamil at nearly
