= Anthu Inthu Preethi Banthu =

2008 film directed by Veera Shankar Bairisetty

- VCD cover
- Directed by: Veera Shankar
- Written by: Veera Shankar; Selvaraghavan; M. S. Ramesh
- Based on: Aadavari Matalaku Arthale Verule (Telugu) by Selvaraghavan
- Produced by: Aditya Babu
- Starring: Aditya Babu; Ramya; Harish Raj; Srinivasa Murthy
- Cinematography: H. C. Venugopal
- Edited by: Deepu. S. Kumar
- Music by: Gurukiran; Yuvan Shankar Raja (unc.)
- Production company: Aditya Arts
- Release date: 12 August 2008
- Running time: 146 minutes
- Country: India
- Language: Kannada

Anthu Inthu Preethi Banthu (transl. Love Came Like That) is a 2008 Indian Kannada-language romantic drama film directed by Veera Shankar. It stars debutante Aditya Babu and Ramya. The film is a remake of the 2007 Telugu film Aadavari Matalaku Arthale Verule with Shankar Melkote reprising his role. Babu also produced the film. The film's title is based on the opening line of a song from Milana (2007).

== Plot ==
Shiv Prakash "Shivu" is from a middle-class family. He makes several bids to obtain employment, but all go in vain due to his poor language skills and inadequate educational qualifications. All his friends settled in life, but he continues to struggle to find employment. Shivu has two best friends, Hari and Sunil. His father is a teacher and is always critical of him for being an irresponsible person, only adding to his already long list of woes.

At this juncture, Shivu catches a glimpse of Preethi and immediately falls in love with her. He learns that she works for a software solutions firm. Luckily, Shivu eventually secured employment in the same firm. Preethi, however, turns out to be short-tempered. On a business trip, Shivu accompanies her along with other colleagues to Australia. There, he reveals his feelings of love to her. She declines, saying that she comes from an orthodox family, and her marriage has already been arranged with her cousin.

Shivu returns to India in a depressed manner. Unable to see his son in depression, his father tries to convince Preethi, but she insults him for recommending his son's love and accidentally slaps both Shivu and his father. Later that night, Shivu's father dies of a heart attack. Shivu again goes into depression. To ease Shivu's mood, Hari persuades him to come along to his family's house in the countryside. Coincidentally, on the train journey, Preethi is revealed to be Hari's fiancée. However, their grandfather's intention of getting them married earlier is put aside because Hari and Preethi leave the house to make their own identity. This causes heartache to their grandfather.

With the passing of a few days, the parents of Preethi and Hari decide to marry to appease their grandfather. After several turns of events, Preethi realizes that she is in love with Shivu instead. Shivu asks her to forget him, during a late-night meeting, because he believes that it would create problems in their happy family. Preethi's grandfather notices them conversing and admonishes Preethi for bringing disrepute to their family and asks Shivu to leave his village. Shivu gets ready to leave when he sees everyone putting up decorations for the wedding. Hari furiously asks him to get out, but Shivu responds that they have misunderstood Preethi all along.

However, Hari and Preethi's wedding is taking place that morning. Upon knowing Shivu's condition, Sunil asks Hari to come and help. Though initially reluctant, Hari abandons his wedding to help Shivu. Everyone else slowly leaves for the hospital, except Preethi and her grandfather. Preethi says that she would never disobey her grandfather. Afterward, her grandfather takes Preethi to the hospital. While Shivu recovers and wakes up to leave, he sees that everyone in the family is outside his room, including Preethi and her grandfather.

In time, Keerthi's family comes to stay with Shivu for a few days. The film ends when Shivu and Preethi become a couple and live together.

== Cast ==
- Aditya Babu as Shiv Prakash a.k.a. Shivu
- Ramya as Preethi "Bhramarambike"
- Harish Raj as Hari, Shivu's friend
- Srinivasa Murthy as Sathyaprakash, Shivu's father
- Lokanath as Hari's grandfather
- Rangayana Raghu as Veerabhadra
- Chitra Shenoy as Hari's aunt
- Kuri Prathap as Sunil
- Sathyajith as Babu Rao
- Malathi Sardeshpande as Hari's aunt
- Shashikala
- Kishori Ballal as Hari's grandmother
- Ramesh Pandith as Neelakantha
- Mandya Ramesh as Thimma
- Rajashekhar Naidu
- Madhu Hegde
- Shankar Melkote as Software company MD
- Vithika Sheru as Neelambike "Neelu"
- Pakhi Hegde in a special appearance in the song "O Baby"

== Production ==
Aditya Babu, the producer of the Telugu film Jagadam (2007), made his acting debut with this film, which was shot in Hyderabad.

== Soundtrack ==
The soundtrack features 7 songs overall, out of which 4 songs were retained from the original Telugu soundtrack, composed by noted Tamil music director Yuvan Shankar Raja, while the remaining 3 were composed by Gurukiran. Lyrics were written by Kaviraj and Hrudaya Shiva. The soundtrack was released on 22 May 2008.

The order of the songs were also changed with "Nee Chumu Chumu" appearing first although the Telugu version featured that song second.

Song	Singer(s)	Duration	Notes
"Nee Chumu Chumu"	Karthik, Chaitra HG	5:41	Composed by Yuvan Shankar Raja
"O Baby"	Hemanth Kumar, Chaitra HG	5:37	Composed by Yuvan Shankar Raja
"Antu Intu 1"	Gurukiran	3:19	Composed by Gurukiran
"Mandaara Mandaara"	Rajesh Krishnan	4:38	Composed by Yuvan Shankar Raja
"Minugu Minugu"	Gurukiran, Apoorva	4:44	Composed by Yuvan Shankar Raja
"Antu Intu 2"	Haricharan	3:19	Composed by Gurukiran
"Modala Sala"	Kunal Ganjawala, Akanksha Badami	4:21	Composed by Gurukiran

== Reception ==
Film critic R. G. Vijayasarathy of IANS wrote that "A neat film that can be recommended for family audience". A critic from Rediff.com wrote that "On the whole, it is a well made film".
