= Kiccha Huccha =

- Film poster
- Directed by: Chi. Guru Dutt
- Written by: Mysskin
- Based on: Chithiram Pesuthadi (2006) by Mysskin
- Produced by: K Manju
- Starring: Sudeep; Ramya
- Music by: V. Harikrishna
- Release date: 15 October 2010
- Country: India
- Language: Kannada

Kichcha Huchcha is a 2010 Indian Kannada-language romantic action drama film starring Sudeep, Ramya and Srinath. It is directed by Chi. Guru Dutt and produced by K Manju. It is a remake of the Tamil film Chithiram Pesuthadi. The film was released on 15 October 2010 and later dubbed in Telugu as Kichcha in 2012.

== Plot ==
Kichcha is a fearless kung-fu fighter, who saves the son of a local don Anna from being killed by members of a rival gang. In return, Anna hires Kichcha as his henchman. Kichcha's mother and younger sister dislike his association with the gang but have to live with his decision. One day, Kichcha stumbles upon Aishwarya aka Aishu, a worker at a NGO, who fights injustice. A quarrel ensues between them and they grow to dislike each other. Nobody has spoken up to Kichcha before, and he admires Aishu's courage. Whenever they bump into one another, Aishu berates Kichcha for being a gangster. Ashamed, Kichcha and his friends try to turn over a new leaf by selling toys on a sidewalk. Aishu is impressed by Kichcha's changed personality and decides to marry him. Her father gives her his blessings, though her uncle does not approve.

However, her hopes are shattered after she witnesses Kichcha being clumped away in a police truck from a brothel after a raid. She gives up her plans of being with him and blames her father for not raising her well enough to make the right decision. Later that day, her father commits suicide. Aishu blames Kichcha for ruining her life and causing her father's death. Kichcha and his friends return to work for Anna. Aishu's uncle arranges for her to be married to his own relative. However, Anna's son sees Aishu during her engagement and falls in love with her. Anna threatens Aishu's uncle to surrender his niece to him. After learning that Kichcha is part of Anna's gang, Aishu goes to confront him. Kichcha's friends reveal that he was only at the brothel that day to save his friend's family, who lives there.

Instead, Kichcha sees Aishu's father there, who was in the company of prostitutes. In order to give time for Aishu's father to flee the area, Kichcha creates a distraction by attacking the police officers. They beat him up and arrested him. Aishu realizes her mistake and asks Kichcha's friends to take her to him. Meanwhile, Kichcha has devised his own plans in an attempt to thwart Anna's plans and save Aishu. He has arranged for his friends to bring Aishu and her fiancé separately to the registrar's office to get them married. However, Anna shows up and orders his men to attack Kichcha. When Aishu arrives at the scene, she is overwhelmed to see that Kichcha has been stabbed and is fighting for his life. Only then did Anna realize that she and Kichcha are in love. He stops the attack and lets Kichcha's friends rush him to the hospital. Kichcha is saved, and Anna agrees to let him go. Kichcha and Aishu get married and live happily ever after.

== Cast ==
- Sudeep as Kichcha
- Ramya as Aishwarya aka Aishu
- Rangayana Raghu
- Srinath as Aishu's father
- Girish Shivanna
- Bianca Desai
- Suresh Chandra as Anna

== Soundtrack ==
The music was composed by V. Harikrishna with lyrics penned by Yogaraj Bhat.

No.	Title	Singer(s)	Length
1.	"Bandu Baaja"	Priya Himesh	4:17
2.	"Hey Preeti"	Rahul Nambiar	4:26
3.	"Nudisale"	Sonu Nigam, Anuradha Sriram	4:48
4.	"Kamali Kamali"	Kailash Kher, Priyadarshini	4:10
5.	"Modala Baari"	S. P. Balasubrahmanyam	4:50

== Reception ==
Shruti Indira Lakshminarayana of Rediff.com scored the film at 1.5 out of 5 stars and says "Gurudut gets his idea of comic relief - very little of which there is in the film - wrong too. His 'I live to eat' character fails to tickle your funny bone. Dialogues lack punch as well. The film comes with a message that things can go awfully wrong if you don't speak your mind. Watch this one if you must for the lead pair and only if you haven't seen the original Chithiram Pesudadi". A critic from The Times of India scored the film at 3.5 out of 5 stars and wrote "Sudeep's performance is praiseworthy, while Ramya has put up a brillaint show. Srinath is gracious too, and Pushpa Swamy impresses the audience even in that only one scene which she appears on screen. V Harikrishna's music has some catchy tunes and Srivenkat's cinematography is equally good".
