= Prema Kosam =

- Directed by: Veera Shankar
- Written by: Posani Krishna Murali (dialogues)
- Screenplay by: Veera Shankar
- Story by: Veera Shankar; Vakkantham Vamsi
- Produced by: D. Yugandhar
- Starring: Venkat; Vineeth; Asha Saini
- Cinematography: Ram Prasad
- Music by: Raj
- Release date: 1999
- Country: India
- Language: Telugu

Prema Kosam (transl. For love) is a 1999 Indian Telugu-language romantic thriller film directed by Veera Shankar starring Venkat, Vineeth, and Asha Saini. The film failed commercially at box-office.

== Cast ==
- Venkat as Chandu
- Vineeth as Rahul
- Asha Saini as Aishwarya
- Tanikella Bharani
- Brahmanandam
- Sudha
- Chalapathi Rao
- Narra Venkateswara Rao
- Mallikarjuna Rao
- Uttej
- Narsing Yadav
- Tirupathi Prakash
- Rajiv Kanakala
- Jhansi

== Production ==
Flora Saini made her debut through this film and was rechristened as Asha Saini by the film's producer.

== Soundtrack ==
The music was composed by Raj with lyrics written by Sirivennela Seetharama Sastry, Bhuvana Chandra and Chandrabose.

Track listing
No.	Title	Lyrics	Singer(s)	Length
1.	"Neevu Leka"	Bhuvana Chandra	Devi Sri Prasad, Sharada
2.	"Mallepoovalle Navve Navve"	Sirivennela Seetharama Sastry	S. P. Balasubrahmanyam
3.	"Nijamena Ee Prabhatam"	Sirivennela Seetharama Sastry	P. Unnikrishnan, Swarnalatha Jr.
4.	"E Dil Mange Mor"	Chandrabose	Mano
5.	"Kanipinchave Ma Kantiki"	Sirivennela Seetharama Sastry	Mano, K. S. Chithra, Sriram

== Reception ==
Griddaluru Gopalrao of Zamin Ryot praised director Veera Shankar's attempt to show a love triangle in a new approach and lauded his attempt as innovative, different, and unique. Sify wrote "The much publicised love story turned out to be recycled trash! [..] Prema Kosam just lacks that, thanks to the inept handling of a sensitive theme by director Veera Sankar. In a desperate attempt, the director depends on the sickness, `Amnesia` to bring a twist to the subject".
