= Veera Shankar =

Indian Telugu Film Director

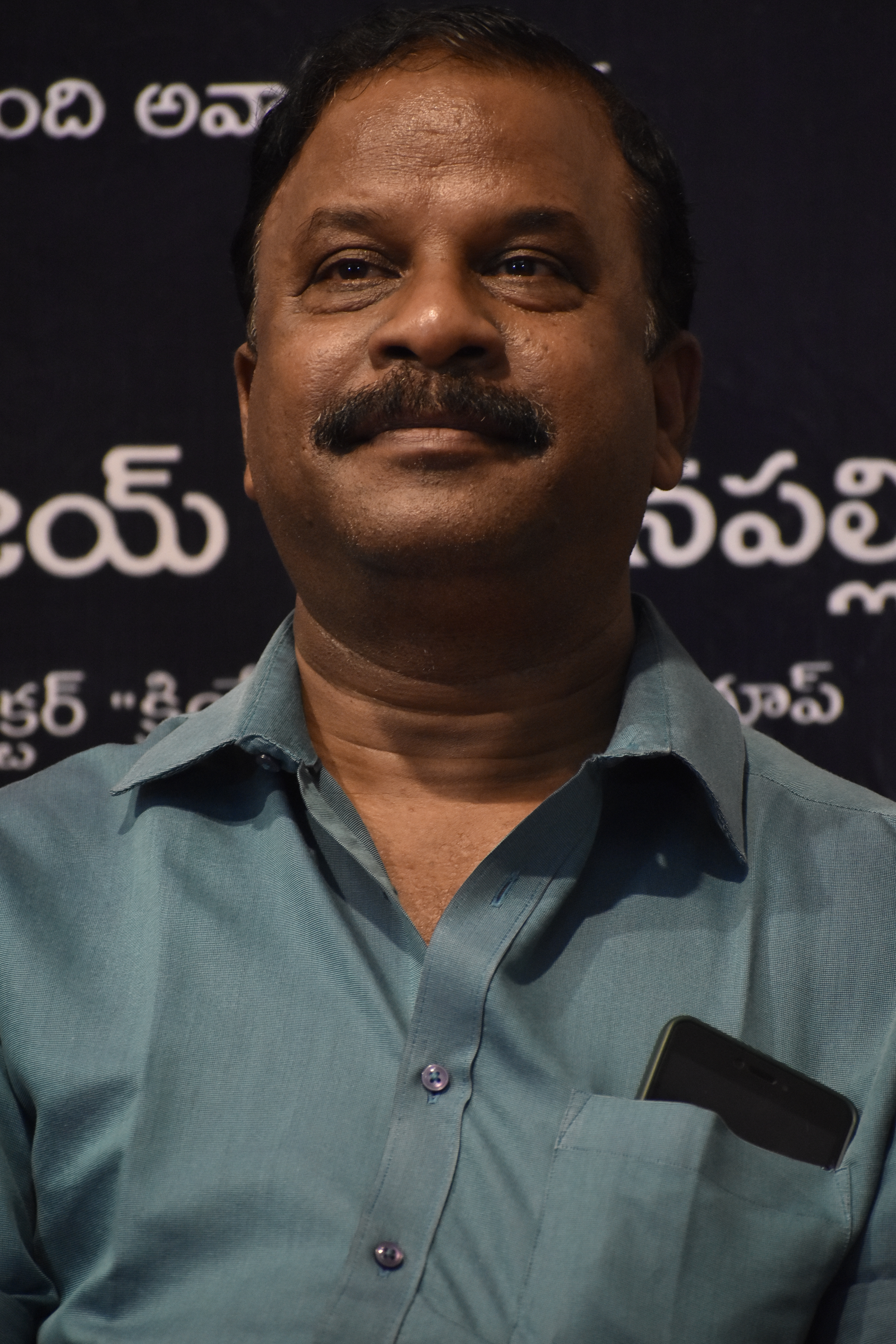
- 2021
- Born: Tanuku, Andhra Pradesh
- Occupation: Director
- Years active: 1997–present

Veera Shankar is an Indian film director who works in Telugu and Kannada films.

== Early life and career ==
Veera Sanker is a director, writer and producer in Telugu and Kannada film industries. He made his directorial debut in 1997 with Hello ! I Love You film starring Srikanth and Sadhika. This film was based on the famous novel “Vennello Aadapilla” by Yandamuri Veerendranath. The film won the State Award for Best Editing.

His next films were Prema Kosam and Vijaya Ramaraju, which won three State Awards. His big break came when he directed Pawan Kalyan's Gudumba Shankar, a family entertainer. He made Puneeth Rajkumar’s Namma Basava, which was a success and ran 100 days in many centers. He directed and produced in addition to writing story and screenplay. His next project was Anthu Inthu Preethi Banthu. Later on, he directed and produced the Telugu film Mana Kurralle released on 1st Jan, 2015. He served as President of Telugu Film Directors Association during 2014–2018.

== Filmography ==
Key
†	Denotes films that have not yet been released

Year	Title	Language	Notes
1997	Hello I Love You	Telugu	
1999	Prema Kosam	Telugu	
2000	Vijayaramaraju	Telugu	
2004	Gudumba Shankar	Telugu	
2005	Namma Basava	Kannada	
2008	Anthu Inthu Preethi Banthu	Kannada	
2015	Mana Kurrale	Telugu	
2018	Yuvarajyam	Telugu	

As actor

- Jathi Ratnalu (2021)
- Oka Chinna Family Story (2021)
- Virata Parvam (2022)
- Gandharwa (2022)
- Bujji Ila Raa (2022)
