= Magic Ajji =

- Promotional poster
- Directed by: Dinesh Baboo
- Written by: Dinesh Baboo
- Produced by: Subba Raju
- Starring: Khushbu Sundar; Sudha Rani; Thejas Kesari; Ramesh Bhat; Mandya Ramesh; Chi. Guru Dutt; Ganesh
- Cinematography: Dinesh Baboo
- Edited by: B S Kemparaju
- Music by: Adhi
- Production company: Rajassu Combines
- Release date: 17 June 2005
- Running time: 2 hours 29 minutes
- Country: India
- Language: Kannada

Magic Ajji (transl. Magic Grandma) is a 2005 Indian Kannada language fantasy film directed by Dinesh Baboo. It was the first digital film shot in high-definition in Kannada, and the second to be released. The first being Baboo's 2004 Kanakambari. Magic Ajji stars Khushbu Sundar as Queen Rajeshwari Devi, the grandmother and ghost, Master Tejas (Thejas Kesari) as grandson Arjun, and Sudha Rani as Arjun's mother Nirmala Devi. The movie won critical acclaim for its family entertainment quotient, unprecedented use of special effects and animation, and for the performances on Khushbu and Thejas Kesari.

== Plot ==
Magic Ajji deals with a royal family under Queen Rajeshwari Devi (Khushbu Sundar). One of the sons in the family marries a woman belonging to a lower caste (Sudha Rani), and is disowned by the family. After his premature death, the other family members keep the wife and the son Arjun (Thejas) away from the palace. The queen dies on the night of her 100th birthday. She then comes back in the form of a friendly ghost to help Arjun and his mother claim their rightful place in the palace. This is the tale of an old woman who controls the affairs of a royal palace who is visible to her grandson after her death and helps him in his distress.

== Cast ==
- Khushbu Sundar as Queen Rajeshwari Devi, Ajji (voice dubbed by Girija Lokesh)
- Thejas Kesari as Arjun
- Sudha Rani as Nirmala Devi, Arjun's Mother
- Ramesh Bhat as Queen's grandson-in-law
- Chitra Shenoy as Queen's granddaughter
- Chi. Guru Datt as Queen's grandson-in-law
- Pooja Lokesh as Queen's granddaughter
- Mandya Ramesh as Queen's grandson-in-law
- Roopa Iyer as Queen's granddaughter
- Pruthvi Raj as Venkatachalayya, Queen's Advocate
- Ganesh as Venkatachalayya's subordinate
- Karibasavaiah as an exorcist
- Shivaram as Royal Priest
- Karthik Sharma as Karthik

== Production ==
Reports that Khushbu Sundar would play the role of a 100-year-old grandmother in Magic Ajji emerged in July 2003. When asked how she came to accept the role of a grandmother, she stated: "the role matters to me the most. As long as I get a prominent role, I don't mind playing any role including that of a grandmother." She added, "I have everything going for me in this film. I basically play the grandmother, but thanks to the director's imagination running wild, I also transform into a village belle and an air hostess in certain parts of the film. But I am not playing a witch, mind you! Basically, Magic Ajji will be a fun film for the children."

== Reception ==
P. K. Hariyabbe, the reviewer for Deccan Herald, called the film "highly interesting, not just for its simple plot, but for the special effects." They felt "Khushboo as the Ajji, is a revelation" and added, "Master Tejas as Arjuna Krishna does a great job. The supporting cast chips in efficiently to make this film an entertainer."

== See also ==
- Cinema of Karnataka
