= Tirupathi Prakash =

Indian actor

Timmapuram Karanam Ravi Prakash Rao, popularly known as Tirupathi Prakash, is an Indian actor and comedian in Telugu cinema.

== Filmography ==
- Nani (1992)
- Repati Koduku (1992)
- Jamba Lakidi Pamba (1993)
- Manavaralli Pelli (1993)
- Varasudu (1993)
- Abbaigaru (1993)
- Alibaba Aradajanu Dongalu (1993)
- Brahmachari Mogudu (1994)
- Aame (1994)
- Adavi Dora (1995)
- Adirindi Guru (1996)
- Akkada Ammayi Ikkada Abbayi (1996)
- Suswagatham (1997)
- Oka Chinna Maata (1997)
- Priyamaina Srivaru (1997)
- Hitler (1997)
- Master (1997)
- Jolly (1998) (Tamil)
- Pavitra Prema (1998)
- Snehitulu (1998)
- Aaha (1998)
- Pape Naa Pranam (1998)
- Suprabhatam (1998)
- Prema Kosam (1999) as Chandu's friend
- Krishna Babu (1999)
- Panchadara Chilaka (1999)
- Manasunna Maaraju (2000)
- Manasichanu (2000)
- Ammo! Okato Tareekhu (2000)
- Vijayaramaraju (2000)
- Tholi Valapu (2001)
- Raa (2001)
- Neetho Cheppalani (2002)
- Anveshana (2002)
- Nijam (2003)
- Villain (2003)
- Gudumba Shankar (2004)
- Shankar Dada MBBS (2004)
- 786 Khaidi Premakatha (2005)
- Maayajaalam (2006)
- Bhookailas (2007)
- Yamagola Malli Modalayindi (2007)
- Maa Ayana Chanti Pilladu (2008)
- Black & White (2008)
- Alasyam Amrutham (2010)
- Ranga The Donga (2010)
- Seema Tapakai (2011)
- Aa Marma (2012) (Kannada)
- Sevakudu (2013)
- Sukumarudu (2013)
- Malligadu Marriage Bureau (2014)
- Erra Bus (2014)
- Eluka Majaka (2016)
- Sita (2019) as Chandulal Seth

=== Television ===
- Sangharshana for ETV Telugu
- Viyyankulu for ETV
- Mr. Romeo for Zee Telugu
- Sambarala Rambabu for Maa TV
- Jabardasth (2016)
- Extra Jabardasth (2016)
