= Gudumba Shankar =

- Directed by: Veera Shankar
- Screenplay by: Pawan Kalyan
- Dialogues by: Satyanand
- Story by: Satyanand
- Based on: Kanyasulkam by Gurajada Apparao
- Produced by: Nagendra Babu
- Starring: Pawan Kalyan; Meera Jasmine; Ashish Vidyarthi
- Cinematography: Chota K. Naidu
- Edited by: Yusuf Khan
- Music by: Mani Sharma
- Production company: Anjana Productions
- Release date: 10 September 2004
- Running time: 176 minutes
- Country: India
- Language: Telugu

Gudumba Shankar is a 2004 Indian Telugu-language action comedy film directed by Veera Shankar and produced by Nagendra Babu under Anjana Productions banner. Pawan Kalyan plays the title role, wrote the screenplay, and choreographed three songs and the action scenes. The film also stars Meera Jasmine and Ashish Vidyarthi while Sayaji Shinde, Brahmanandam, and Ali play supporting roles. The music was scored by Mani Sharma with cinematography by Chota K. Naidu.

== Plot ==
Gudumba Shankar is a small-time thief who makes a living by arresting people. On his way to Mumbai, he accidentally meets Gowri. Both of them are forced to travel together. A few more incidents make them good friends. Shankar realizes that Gowri is a girl who ran away from her house. By then, they start having feelings for each other. A rowdy named Kumaraswamy wants to marry Gowri forcibly, as her astrology is auspicious for him, and this is why she runs away from her home. Soon, Kumarasamy takes Gowri back to the house.

Kumaraswamy is extremely superstitious and heavily depends on the astrology of Parabrahma Swamy. Shankar blackmails Parabrahma (to disclose his illicit affair) and joins the wedding house as the wedding planner along with Paidiraju and two other buddies. Shankar later tricks Kumaraswamy into thinking that Gowri is inauspicious to him and that if he marries her he will be destroyed. He plans elaborate tricks by burning or hurting someone wherever Gowri is involved. After Kumaraswamy leaves, Shankar marries Gowri, but Kumaraswamy comes and beats up Shankar and kidnaps Gowri. Shankar miraculously wakes up, beats up everyone, and takes Gowri back.

== Cast ==
- Pawan Kalyan as Shankar Deekshithulu / Gudumba Shankar / Kalyanji Anandji
- Meera Jasmine as Gowri / Mangatayaru
- Ashish Vidyarthi as Kumaraswamy
- Sayaji Shinde as 'Bejawada' Narayana
- Brahmanandam as Parabrahma Swamy
- Ali as Paidiraju / Katrina Knife
- Sunil as Prabhu
- Kota Srinivasa Rao as Devudu
- Rajan P. Dev as Kumaraswamy's uncle
- Sudeepa Pinky as Pinky, Gowri's sister
- Bhuvaneswari
- Kavitha
- Venu Madhav
- Ponnambalam
- Raghu Babu
- L. B. Sriram
- Tirupathi Prakash
- Master Bharath
- Natanya Singh in an item song "Killi Killi"

== Production ==
In March 2004, Idlebrain reported that the title Gudumba Shankar was confirmed for Pawan Kalyan's film directed by Veera Shankar. At that time, 50% of the shooting was completed and the film was scheduled for release in July 2004.

== Music ==
The film has six songs composed by Mani Sharma. Aditya Music acquired the audio rights.

No.	Title	Lyrics	Singer(s)	Length
1.	"Le Le Le Le"	Chandrabose	KK	05:00
2.	"Chiguraaku Chaatu Chiluka"	Sirivennela Sitarama Sastry	Sunitha, S. P. B. Charan	04:50
3.	"Chilakamma"	Chandrabose	Karthik, Sri Vardhini	05:13
4.	"Chitti Nadumune"	Sirivennela Sitarama Sastry	Mallikarjun, Premgi Amaren	04:54
5.	"Emantaro"	Chandrabose	S. P. B. Charan, Harini	06:07
6.	"Kili Kili"	Masterji	Muralidhar, Pawan Kalyan	05:20

== Reception ==
The film received mixed reviews but was a commercial success, largely due to Kalyan's popularity. Kalyan's choreography of the realistic action scenes was praised. His unique style, including wearing double pants, was a major trendsetter at the time.

Sify rated the film 3/5 and called it "disappointing." The reviewer wrote, "You desperately want to like the film for the maddeningly zany characters played out by Pawan, Meera, Ali, Brahmanandam and others. Alas but nobody can improve on this script full of scenes, inspired from half a dozen Hollywood and Bollywood films of yesteryears!" Griddaluru Goplarao of Zamin Ryot also criticized the weak storyline and screenplay.

== Re-release ==
Gudumba Shankar was re-released after 19 years. The initial date was fixed as August 31, 2023. Then it got postponed and was re-released on September 2, on Pawan Kalyan's birthday, marked as one of the highest grosser amongst the recent re-releases.
