= Abhi (2003 film) =

2003 film by Dinesh Babu

- DVD cover
- Directed by: Dinesh Babu
- Written by: Dinesh Babu
- Produced by: Parvathamma Rajkumar
- Starring: Puneeth Rajkumar; Ramya
- Cinematography: Dinesh Babu
- Edited by: S. Manohar
- Music by: Gurukiran
- Production company: Poornima Enterprises
- Release date: 25 April 2003
- Running time: 140 minutes
- Country: India
- Language: Kannada
- Box office: 16 crore

Abhi is a 2003 Indian Kannada-language romantic action comedy film written and directed by Dinesh Babu and produced by Parvathamma Rajkumar under Poornima Enterprises. The film stars Puneeth Rajkumar in the titular role, with Ramya, making her debut in Kannada cinema. Dr. Rajkumar sang a song for the film composed by Gurukiran. The film was remade in Telugu as Abhimanyu, with Nandamuri Kalyan Ram reprising Puneeth Rajkumar's role and Ramya reprising her role in the Telugu version.

Abhi was released on 25 April 2003 and became a commercial success and it became one of the highest grossing Kannada films of 2003.

== Plot ==
Abhi, a college student in Bangalore, meets a Muslim girl Bhanu as her relatives are staying in Abhi's rental house. Abhi and Bhanu get to know each other and begin a relationship. Bhanu's father Mohammed Khan learns about this and gets shocked and enraged upon learning Abhi's identity. Mohammed Khan arrives in Bangalore to search for Abhi, finds him at the college and begins to attack him. Abhi does not agree with Khan's behaviour and brutally thrashes Khan in the college but stops after learning that Khan is Bhanu's father.

Khan vacates the house, and they all leave for Hubli. Abhi and his friends head to Hubli and manage to talk with Bhanu. Bhanu's grandmother advises Abhi to leave the house immediately as Khan and his men will be coming back from the mosque after the prayer. Abhi asks Bhanu's grandmother about the reason why Khan tried to kill him earlier, and she tells him to ask his mother Janaki. Abhi returns home and reveals details about Khan to Janaki. Janaki reveals to Abhi that she is his adopted mother and his real parents are Ruksana Bano and Joseph.

Ruksana and Joseph fell in love, eloped and got married, but their inter-religion marriage was not accepted by Khan and his father Abdul Ghaffar Khan. Khan and Abdul Ghaffar Khan learnt about Ruksana and Joseph's location, where they brutally killed them and were about to kill an infant Abhi, but the local people arrived and saved Abhi from danger. When many people were hesitant to adopt Abhi, Janaki adopted Abhi as her own son and they left for Bangalore for a new life.

Learning this, Abhi decides to breakup with Bhanu for Janaki's sake. Bhanu also learns about Abhi's past from her grandmother, where she also decides to breakup with Abhi for her family's sake. Bhanu meets Abhi and the two breakup with each other. Khan assumes that Bhanu ran away to marry Abhi and tries to kill him, but Abhi defeats Khan. Bhanu's grandmother advises Khan to stop his cruelty. Khan realizes his mistake and allows Bhanu to marry Abhi.

== Cast ==
- Puneeth Rajkumar as Abhishek "Abhi"
- Ramya as Bhanu, Abhi's love interest
- Sowcar Janaki as Bhanu's grandmother
- Sumithra as Janaki Sudarshan, Abhi's mother
- Umashree as Haseena Begum
- Sathyajith as Mohammad Khan
- Hulivana Gangadharaiah as Abdul Ghaffar Khan
- B. Jaya as Radha, maid in Abhi's home
- Shailaja Joshi as Mohammad Khan's wife
- Suneel Puranik as Joseph
- Rekha V. Kumar as Ruksana Bano
- Bharath Bhagavathar as SI Saif Ali
- Enagi Nataraj
- Raju Ananthaswamy
- Honnavalli Krishna
- Vaijanath Biradar
- Kavya Prakash
- Gundu Rao
- Sridhar
- Nagaraj
- Guruprasad
- Mahesh
- Sundaresh
- Tumkur Mohan

== Soundtrack ==
Abhi

Soundtrack album by Gurukiran
- Released: June 2007
- Genre: Feature film soundtrack
External audio
- Official Audio Jukebox on YouTube

No.	Title	Lyrics	Singer(s)	Length
1.	"Mama Mama Maja Madu"	Hamsalekha	Puneeth Rajkumar	4:12
2.	"Sum Sumne"	Bangiranga	Udit Narayan, Sowmya Raoh	3:53
3.	"Ee Nanna Kannane"	K. Kalyan	Udit Narayan, Mahalakshmi Iyer	5:07
4.	"Vidhi Baraha"	K. Kalyan	Dr. Rajkumar	4:30
5.	"Bittaku Guru"	V. Nagendra Prasad	Shankar Mahadevan, Chetan Sosca	4:45

== Reception ==
Chitraloka.com wrote "The redeeming feature of this film is the mixture. A right film at the right time from equally right banner!." Viggy wrote that "One can say, film Abhi in general, exceeds Puneet's earlier film Appu in all respect, Good film to watch."
