= Kotigobba =

2001 film directed by Naganna

- Theatrical release poster
- Directed by: Naganna
- Written by: Suresh Krissna
- Based on: Baashha (1995)
- Produced by: D.Kamalakar; M. B. Babu
- Starring: Vishnuvardhan; Priyanka Upendra; Ashish Vidyarthi
- Cinematography: Ramesh Babu
- Edited by: Suresh Urs
- Music by: Deva
- Production company: Superhit Films
- Release date: 16 November 2001
- Running time: 167 minutes
- Country: India
- Language: Kannada

Kotigobba (transl. One in a crore) is a 2001 Indian Kannada-language action film starring Vishnuvardhan, Priyanka Upendra and Ashish Vidyarthi. The film was a remake of Rajinikanth's 1995 Tamil film Baashha which itself was inspired from the 1991 Hindi movie Hum. This movie was directed by Naganna and features soundtrack from Deva who also composed the music for the Tamil version. Vishnuvardhan was nominated for Filmfare Best Actor category.

A spiritual successor, Kotigobba 2, starring Sudeep and directed by K. S. Ravikumar was released in 2016.

== Plot ==
Nanjunda (Vishnuvardhan), an auto driver, known for his peace loving nature and calm nature. It takes a turn when we discover that the peace loving auto driver actually has a violent past which led to the death of his father.

== Cast ==
- Vishnuvardhan as Nanjunda / Jai Simha
- Priyanka Upendra as Bharathi, Nanjunda's wife
- Sathyapriya as Sumithra, Nanjunda's stepmother
- Ramesh Bhat as Anna Seth / Rajappa, Nanjunda's friend
- Ashish Vidyarthi as Mark Antony, main antogonist
- Avinash as Keshava, Bharathi's father
- Abhijith as Shiva / Anwar, Nanjunda's adopted brother and Mark Antony's son
- Kaushiki as Vani, Nanjunda's half-sister
- Vinodhini as Lakshmi (credited as Shwetha), Nanjunda's half-sister
- Girish Shetty as Yogesh, Lakshmi's husband
- Rajesh as Khandelkar, Nanjunda's father
- Devaraj as Amar, Nanjunda's close friend
- Lakshman as DGP S. G. Naik
- Chi. Guru Dutt as Balarama, a local rowdy
- Tennis Krishna as Krishna, Nanjunda's friend
- M. S. Karanth
- Ravi Chethan as Charan
- Lohithaswa as Lakshmi's father-in-law
- Pushpa Swamy as Susheela
- Krishne Gowda as auto rickshaw driver
- Shani Mahadevappa
- R. G. Vijayasarathy as marriage officiant
- M. N. Suresh

== Soundtrack ==
Kotigobba
- Soundtrack cover

Soundtrack album by Deva
- Released: 5 October 2001
- Genre: Feature film soundtrack
- Language: Kannada
- Label: Jhankar Music
- Producer: Deva

Deva chronology
Dost (2001)	Kotigobba (2001)	Pammal K. Sambandam (2002)

All the songs are composed and scored by Deva. The song "Annayya Thammayya" is a direct reused song of composer's own "Athaanda Ithaanda" from the Tamil film Arunachalam. The album has six soundtracks and an instrumental number. The songs "Sahasa Simha" and "Are Tai Tandana" were retained from the original Tamil film also composed by Deva. The audio launch was held at Capitol Hotel on 3 August 2001.

Track listing
No.	Title	Lyrics	Singer(s)	Length
1.	"Annayya Tammayya"	K. Kalyan	S. P. Balasubrahmanyam	6:00
2.	"Are Tai Tai Tandana"	K. Kalyan	S. P. Balasubrahmanyam	6:38
3.	"Kaverige Kalungara"	K. Kalyan	S. P. Balasubrahmanyam, K. S. Chithra	6:04
4.	"Sahasa Simha"	K. Kalyan	S. P. Balasubrahmanyam	5:15
5.	"Tingala Belakina Angaladalli"	K. Kalyan	S. P. Balasubrahmanyam, K. S. Chitra	4:06
6.	"Vardhana Vishnuvardhana"	K. Kalyan	S. P. Balasubrahmanyam, K. S. Chitra	3:40
7.	"Annayya Tammayya"		Instrumental

== Release ==
=== Reception ===
A critic from Sify wrote that "On the whole Kotigobba is a great entertainer and a must see film for Vishnuvardhan fans". A critic from Chitraloka wrote that "‘KOTIGOBBA’ is not only for fans. It is also for the family and friends. A well made action extravaganza".

=== Box office ===
The film was declared as a blockbuster on successfully completing 30 weeks at the box office and the success function was held at Chowdaiah Memorial Hall in Bengaluru on Saturday, 16 March 2002.

=== Future ===
In 2012, director Suresh Krissna who made the original version announced that he would be making a sequel to this film in Kannada language. However, two unrelated films titled Kotigobba 2 and Kotigobba 3 were made by different directors both starring Sudeep.
