= Dinesh Baboo =

Film director

- Born: Thiruvananthapuram, Kerala, India
- Occupations: Film director, cinematographer, producer, actor, script-writer
- Years active: 1984–present
- Spouse: Sobhana K K
- Awards: 1988, 1997 - Karnataka State Film Award

Dinesh Baboo (also known as Dinesh Babu) is an Indian film director, cinematographer, actor and screenwriter who works predominantly in Kannada cinema. In a career spanning five decades he has directed more than 40 films, filmed more than 20 films and been the scriptwriter for 6 films. He is the recipient of several accolades including two Karnataka State Film Awards, two Filmfare Awards South and two Cinema Express Awards.

Baboo has created many critical and commercially successful films, like Suprabhatha, Idu Saadhya, Hendthighelbedi, Amrutha Varshini, Laali, Nishyabda, Abhi, Chitra, Hollywood, Magic Ajji, Neenello Naanalle and Bellary Naga. His 1989 comedy-thriller film Inspector Vikram was an average grosser at the time of release but as over the years attained a "cult" status. He has also been the cinematographer for many commercially successful films, like Paadu Nilave, Ninaive Oru Sangeetham, Dhruvam, Ammayane Sathyam, Commissioner, Pidakkozhi Koovunna Noottandu and The King.

== Career ==
=== Cinematographer ===
His career in cinema started as a cinematographer. He stood behind the camera for noted Malayalam film blockbusters like Dhruvam, Ullasa Poonkattu and the 1994 blockbuster Commissioner which was instrumental in raising Suresh Gopi, to stardom. His most successful film as a cinematographer was the Shaji Kailas' 1995 blockbuster The King, which was the highest grossing Malayalam film at the time.

Great talent in cinematography was the springboard that launched him to great success in the world of cinema. This also helped him to have first hand knowledge of every technical aspect of cinema, which a director need not be necessarily familiar with. He also directed a Malayalam film named Mazhavillu starring Kunchacko Boban and Preeti Jhangiani. Although his camera skills were widely appreciated in Mollywood, his ambition took him to the world of Kannada films where he chose to direct rather than handle the camera.

=== Director ===
His directorial career in the Kannada film world took off with Suprabhatha, a film with Vishnuvardhan and Suhasini which became a box office hit creating many records and gave a major boost to Baboo's career. His next movie was the hugely successful thriller Idu Saadhya in 1989. The movie, featuring eight stars, was made on a shoestring budget of just 1.5 million INR and shot at a single location within 36 hours, setting a record for the fastest completion of an Indian film. He followed it up with the comedy cop thriller - Inspector Vikram - which was a first of its kind in Kannada cinema at that time. Though an average success at the time of its release, the movie has gained cult following among the viewers over the years. As a director, his craftsmanship has been lauded by columnists and reviewers - especially for his screenplay which revolves around very few locations and for successfully blending the comedy and thriller genre.

=== Actor ===
He appeared in front of the camera for the first time as a police officer in the film Accident, directed by Ramesh Aravind.

== Filmography ==
=== Films ===
==== As cinematographer, writer and director ====
Year	Film	Language	Credited as			Notes
Year	Film	Language	Cinematographer	Writer	Director	Notes
1983	Bhagavathipuram Railway Gate	Tamil	✓	✗	✗	
1984	Unnai Naan Santhithen	Tamil	✓	✗	✗	
1984	Nilavu Suduvathillai	Tamil	✓	✗	✗	
1985	Udaya Geetham	Tamil	✓	✗	✗	
1985	Geethanjali	Tamil	✓	✗	✗	
1986	Uyire Unakkaga	Tamil	✓	✗	✗	
1986	Sathya Jyothi	Kannada	✓	✗	✗	
1986	Aayiram Pookkal Malarattum	Tamil	✓	✗	✗	
1987	Paadu Nilave	Tamil	✓	✗	✗	
1987	Ninaive Oru Sangeetham	Tamil	✓	✗	✗	
1987	Manithanin Marupakkam	Tamil	✓	✗	✗	
1987	Unakkaagave Vaazhgiren	Tamil	✓	✗	✗	
1987	Ananda Aradhanai	Tamil	✓	✓	✓	
1988	En Uyir Kannamma	Tamil	✓	✗	✗	
1988	Suprabhatha	Kannada	✓	✓	✓	
1989	Idu Saadhya	Kannada	✓	✓	✓	
1989	Inspector Vikram	Kannada	✓	✓	✓	
1989	Hendthighelbedi	Kannada	✓	✓	✓	
1990	Papa Kosam	Telugu	✓	✓	✓	
1990	Maheshwara	Kannada	✓	✓	✓	
1993	Dhruvam	Malayalam	✓	✗	✗	
1993	Ammayane Sathyam	Malayalam	✓	✗	✗	
1993	Chamayam	Malayalam	✓	✗	✗	
1993	Vasantha Poornima	Kannada	✗	✓ Story	✗	
1994	Commissioner	Malayalam	✓	✗	✗	
1994	Pidakkozhi Koovunna Noottandu	Malayalam	✓	✗	✗	
1994	Thendral Varum Theru	Tamil	✓	✗	✗	
1995	The King	Malayalam	✓	✗	✗	
1995	Ullasappoonkattu	Malayalam	✓	✗	✗	
1996	Mahathma	Malayalam	✓	✗	✗	
1997	Bhoopathi	Malayalam	✓	✗	✗	
1997	Laali	Kannada	✗	✓	✓	
1997	Amruthavarshini	Kannada	✓	✓	✓	
1998	Nishyabda	Kannada	✓	✓	✓	
1998	Hendthigheltini	Kannada	✓	✓	✓	
1999	Premotsava	Kannada	✓	✓	✓	
1999	Mazhavillu	Malayalam	✓	✓	✓	
1999	Nanenu Madlilla	Kannada	✗	✓	✓	
2000	Nan Hendthi Chennagidale	Kannada	✗	✓	✓	
2000	Chitte	Kannada	✗	✓	✓	
2000	Deepavali	Kannada	✓	✓	✓	
2001	Chitra	Kannada	✓	✓ Only screenplay	✓	
2002	Hollywood	Kannada	✓	✗	✓	
2002	Balagalittu Olage Baa	Kannada	✓	✓	✓	
2003	Abhi	Kannada	✓	✓	✓	
2003	Panchali	Kannada	✗	✓	✓	
2004	Kanakambari	Kannada	✓	✓	✓	
2005	Magic Ajji	Kannada	✓	✓	✓	
2005	Pandu Ranga Vittala	Kannada	✓	✓ Only screenplay	✓	Story by V. Vijayendra Prasad
2006	Neenello Naanalle	Kannada	✗	✓ Only screenplay	✓	
2007	Ganesha	Kannada	✓	✓	✓	
2008	Akasha Gange	Kannada	✗	✓	✓	
2008	Neene Neene	Kannada	✓	✗	✗	
2008	Mr. Garagasa	Kannada	✓	✓	✓	
2008	Janumada Gelathi	Kannada	✓	✓	✓	
2008	Accident	Kannada	✗	✗	✗	Only actor
2009	Mr. Painter	Kannada	✓	✓	✓	
2009	Mooru Guttu Ondu Sullu Ondu Nija	Kannada	✓	✓	✓	
2009	Bellary Naga	Kannada	✓	✓ Only screenplay	✓	
2010	School Master	Kannada	✓	✓	✓	
2010	Eradane Maduve	Kannada	✓	✓	✓	
2011	Mathond Madhuvena	Kannada	✗	✓	✓	
2011	Bhale Mogudu Bhale Pellam	Telugu	✓	✓	✓	
2011	Naanalla	Kannada	✗	✓	✓	
2012	Ondu Kshanadalli	Kannada	✗	✓	✓	
2012	Golmal Gayathri	Kannada	✓	✓	✓	
2012	Paper Doni	Kannada	✗	✓ Only lyrics	✗	
2014	Athi Aparoopa	Kannada	✓	✓	✓	
2016	Priyanka	Kannada	✓	✓	✓	
2018	Krishnam	Malayalam	✓	✓ Only screenplay	✓	Partially reshot in Telugu as Dear Krishna (2025)
2018	Preethi Keli Sneha Kaledukollabedi	Kannada	✓	✓	✓	
2018	Nanagista	Kannada	✓	✓	✓	
2019	Hagalu Kanasu	Kannada	✓	✓	✓	
2022	Kasthuri Mahal	Kannada	✓	✓	✓	
TBA	Utthara	Kannada	✓	✓	✓	

=== Television ===
- Mane Mane Kathe
- Akansha
- Swati Muttu
