= Ramya (actress) =

Indian actress and politician (born 1982)

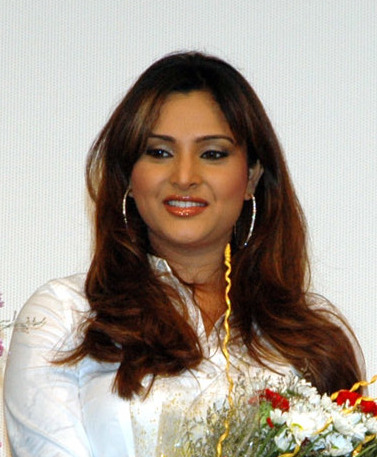
- Ramya in 2006

Member of Parliament, Lok Sabha
- In office August 2013 – 18 May 2014
- Preceded by: N. Chaluvaraya Swamy
- Succeeded by: C. S. Puttaraju
- Constituency: Mandya

Personal details
- Born: Divya Spandana; 29 November 1982 (age 43) Bangalore, Karnataka, India
- Party: Indian National Congress
- Profession: Film actress; film producer; politician

Divya Spandana (born 29 November 1982), known professionally as Ramya, is an Indian actress, film producer and politician. She served as the Member of Parliament in the Lok Sabha, representing the Mandya constituency in Karnataka. Primarily known for her work in Kannada cinema, she has also appeared in Tamil and Telugu films. Widely regarded as one of the leading actresses in Kannada Cinema, she has often been referred as the 'Sandalwood Queen'. Ramya is the recipient of two Filmfare awards, Udaya Award, and a Karnataka State Film Award.

Ramya made her acting debut in the 2003 Kannada-language film Abhi. While she has sporadically worked in Tamil and Telugu films, her most acclaimed performances have been in Kannada film industry which garnered her greater attention. She received the Udaya Award and Filmfare Award for Best Actress for the Amrithadhare (2005) and Tananam Tananam (2006) respectively. Her performance as the eponymous heroine in the 2011 romantic drama Sanju Weds Geetha garnered her further critical success and a Karnataka State Film Award for Best Actress. She has also starred in the 2011 blockbuster fantasy film Katari Veera Surasundarangi and other commercially successful films including the 2016 epic-fantasy Nagarahavu.

After a brief hiatus from acting, Ramya returned to the film industry as a producer. In 2023, she launched her production banner, 'AppleBox Studios' and produced the film Swathi Mutthina Male Haniye, directed by Raj B Shetty. The film received positive critical reception and went on to win several awards, including the Sobha Filmfare Award for Best Actress south for Siri Ravikumar.

Ramya entered politics in 2012 by joining the Indian National Congress as a member of its youth wing. She was elected to the Lok Sabha in 2013 from Mandya constituency in Karnataka, becoming the youngest Member of Parliament in the 16th Lok Sabha and one of the youngest MPs in the Indian Parliament at the time.

== Early life and career ==
Ramya was born in Bangalore, Karnataka, on 29 November 1982. Her parents are originally from Mandya. Her mother, Ranjitha is a senior member of the Indian National Congress in Karnataka while her foster father, R. T. Narayan, was an industrialist. Narayan, who began fostering her when she was five years old, passed away in 2013.

Ramya completed her schooling at Sacred Heart School (Church Park), Chennai, and later at St. Hilda's School, a residential institution in Ooty. She was pursuing a career in modeling and aspired to join the Mumbai-based Sheetal Designer Studio. She graduated with a bachelor's degree in commerce from St. Joseph's College of Commerce, Bangalore.

During her college years, Ramya was active in modelling and participated in ramp shows. Around this time, she began receiving film and eventually made her acting debut in Abhi (2003) opposite Puneeth Rajkumar. It was during the making of the film, the producer Parvathamma Rajkumar gave her the screen name 'Ramya'.

== Film career ==
Ramya made her feature film debut with Puneeth Rajkumar's 2003 Kannada film Abhi. She made her first appearance in the Tamil film industry with the stage name Ramya, with the 2004 film Kuthu opposite Silambarasan. The film had a successful run at the box office, as did her next Tamil film, Giri. Her debut film, however, gave her the name 'Kuthu' Ramya, by which she was then popularly known in Tamil Nadu. She had major box-office success with three Kannada films – Aakash, Gowramma and Amrithadhare – garnering critical acclaim for her performances and establishing her as a leading actress in the film industry.

In 2006, she starred in Julie, a remake of the 1975 Hindi-language film, but it failed to attract audiences. After her following release, Dattha, her next Kannada release, Jothe Jotheyali, which performed well at the box office despite receiving mixed reviews from critics. Her final 2006 release, Tananam Tananam, received an average response commercially and mixed critical reviews, but earned her first Filmfare Award for Best Actress. She had described her role in the film as "little complex" and "challenging".

In 2007, Ramya starred in three feature films; the first of these, Arasu, was a huge hit. She then portrayed a sex worker in a short film made to create awareness about HIV/AIDS as part of Mira Nair, Farhan Akhtar, Vishal Bhardwaj and Santosh Sivan's 'AIDS Jaago' project, which was screened at several international film festival. Her last 2007 film was the Tamil film Polladhavan opposite Dhanush, which was released during Deepavali; it was a commercially successful and her breakthrough in Tamil. Actor Rajinikanth was all praises for the entire crew of Polladhavan.

Her first 2008 release, the Kannada film Mussanjemaatu, opposite Sudeep was a big hit, and gained her a nomination for a Best Actress Award at the 56th Filmfare Awards South. She followed this with the Tamil film Thoondil, a project she later stated she regretted accepting. Later that year, she starred in the films Bombaat and Anthu Inthu Preethi Banthu, the former performing well at the box office. Her final release in 2008 was Gautham Vasudev Menon's Vaaranam Aayiram, opposite Suriya which won that year's National Film Award for the best feature film in Tamil. She was credited as Divya in Vaaranam Aayiram. She dubbed her own voice for this film, which became a critical and commercial success. She did not have any releases in 2009, as both her films, Bhimoos Bang Bang Kids and Jothegaara, were delayed due to financial issues.

By this time, Ramya had become one of the most sought-after actresses in Kannada cinema. She was reportedly the highest-paid actress in the industry at the time and was referred to as the "Golden Girl" due to her consistent box office success.

Her first release of 2010, Just Math Mathalli, received rave reviews, with appreciation for her role. She had two more releases that year, the long-delayed Jothegaara and Kiccha Huccha. Her next release was the Tamil film Singam Puli, followed by the romantic drama Sanju Weds Geetha. The film opened to positive reviews, with Ramya being praised by critics for her performance, which was considered among the best in her career.

In 2012, her first release was a comedy drama, Sidlingu, in which she portrayed the role of a school teacher. This was followed by a light-comedy movie, Lucky opposite Yash. She also appeared in the semi-mythological movie Katari Veera Surasundarangi. In August 2013, Ramya announced that she was considering quitting acting to pursue a career in politics.

Following her brief political career, Ramya made her acting comeback in 2016 with Nagarahavu which was shot in 2012, a film which featured the late actor Vishnuvardhan in the lead role through visual effects. The film generated significant pre-release interest. However, it received negative reviews upon the release and failed to attract an audience due to visual effects.

After nearly seven years of sabbatical, Ramya returned to the film industry with her own production company, AppleBox Studios. The first project, under the banner was Swathi Mutthina Male Haniye (2023) which was directed by Raj B. Shetty. Her goal with this venture is to produce compelling stories, especially around women.

== Political career ==
Ramya joined the Indian Youth Congress in 2012. She became the Indian National Congress (INC) Member of Parliament from Mandya constituency in Karnataka by winning the by-election in 2013. She won the seat, becoming the youngest Member of Parliament (MP) in the 16th Lok Sabha and one of the youngest MPs in the Indian Parliament at that time. In the 2014 Indian general election, she contested from Mandya but was defeated by C. S. Puttaraju by a margin of 5,500 votes.

In May 2017, she was appointed as the head of the INC's social media wing and was made national head of Congress's digital team. She took over the social media team from Deepender Singh Hooda. According to various newspapers and media houses, she is instrumental in turning around Rahul Gandhi's and INC's social media image.

In August 2017, Ramya created the online campaign #AintNoCinderella to support Varnika Kundu, a woman who was "chased and almost kidnapped" one night in Chandigarh. Senior Haryana state BJP politician Ramveer Bhatti told press the attack was Kundu's fault for being out so late: "The girl should not have gone out at 12 in the night. Why was she driving so late in the night? The atmosphere is not right. We need to take care of ourselves." The campaign started when Ramya and friends began posting photos of themselves out late at night with the hashtag #AintNoCinderella. "Why shouldn't women go out after midnight?" Ramya told the BBC. "I'm asking people like Mr Bhatti who are they to set curfew hours for us? I want to ask him who is he to question us? This is such a regressive mindset."

In 2019, there were reports and speculation that Ramya had stepped down as the head of the INC's social media team.

== In the media ==
Ramya has often been cited by the media as one of the most popular actresses in Sandalwood and is known as the "Golden Girl" of Kannada films due to her success rate. Despite a prolonged absence from films, she continues to feature in public ranking and media coverage. In a 2023 survey conducted by Ormax Media on the most popular Kannada actresses, she was ranked second. She has also been featured multiple times in the Bangalore Times Most Desirable Women list. Ramya is one of the most followed Kannada actresses on Instagram.

In addition to her film career, Ramya served as a brand ambassador for the Indian Premier League (IPL) franchise Royal Challengers Bangalore (RCB), alongside Puneeth Rajkumar and Deepika Padukone. She has represented India Summit at Harvard University in the United States. She has also participated in the Times of India Literary Carnival alongside notable figures such as author Sudha Murthy and in humanitarian initiatives, she appeared at the International Rescue Committee (2014) held in New York alongside former British MP, David Miliband. Ramya is recognised for her environmental activism and has been involved with local initiatives such as the 'Earth Warriors' movement in Bangalore, which promotes sustainability and environmental awareness.

== Filmography ==
=== As actor ===
Year	Film	Role	Language	Notes
2003	Abhi	Bhanu	Kannada	
2003	Excuse Me	Madhumitha	Kannada	
2003	Abhimanyu	Saira Banu	Telugu	credited as Spandana
2004	Kuthu	Anjali	Tamil	Credited as Selvi Ramya
2004	Ranga S. S. L. C.	Padma	Kannada	
2004	Kanti	Reema	Kannada	
2004	Giri	Devaki	Tamil	
2005	Aadi	Aishwarya	Kannada	
2005	Aakash	Nandini	Kannada	
2005	Gowramma	Gowri Chandan	Kannada	
2005	Amrithadhare	Amritha	Kannada	
2006	Sevanthi Sevanthi	Sevanthi	Kannada	
2006	Julie	Julie	Kannada	
2006	Dattha		Kannada	
2006	Jothe Jotheyali	Divya	Kannada	
2006	Tananam Tananam	Vanaja	Kannada	
2007	Arasu	Shruthi	Kannada	
2007	Prarambha	Sex worker	Kannada	Short film
2007	Meera Madhava Raghava	Meera	Kannada	
2007	Polladhavan	Hema	Tamil	Credited as Divya Ramya
2008	Thoondil	Pooja/Divya	Tamil	
2008	Mussanjemaatu	Tanu	Kannada	
2008	Meravanige	Ramya	Kannada	Guest appearance
2008	Bombaat	Shalini	Kannada	
2008	Anthu Inthu Preethi Banthu	Preethi	Kannada	
2008	Vaaranam Aayiram	Priya	Tamil	
2010	Just Math Mathalli	Nandini Appaiah "Tanu"	Kannada	
2010	Jothegara	Priya	Kannada	
2010	Kiccha Huccha	Aishwarya	Kannada	
2011	Singam Puli	Swetha	Tamil	
2011	Sanju Weds Geetha	Geetha	Kannada	
2011	Dandam Dashagunam	Maya	Kannada	
2011	Johny Mera Naam Preethi Mera Kaam	Priya	Kannada	
2012	Sidlingu	Mangala	Kannada	
2012	Lucky	Gowri	Kannada	
2012	Katari Veera Surasundarangi	Indraja	Kannada	
2012	Crazy Loka	Herself	Kannada	Special appearance
2014	Aryan	Shwetha	Kannada	
2016	Nagarahavu	Manasa / Nagakanika	Kannada	
2023	Hostel Hudugaru Bekagiddare	Divya	Kannada	Cameo appearance
2026	Raktha Kashmira	Nandini	Kannada	

=== As producer ===
Year	Film	Language	Notes
2023	Swathi Mutthina Male Haniye	Kannada	

== Awards and nominations ==
Year	Film	Award	Category	Result	Ref.
2003	Abhi	51st Filmfare Awards South	Best Actress	Nominated	
2005	Amrithadhare	Udaya Film Awards	Best Actress	Won	
2005	Amrithadhare	53rd Filmfare Awards South	Best Actress	Nominated	
2006	Tananam Tananam	54th Filmfare Awards South	Best Actress	Won	
2006	Tananam Tananam	South Indian Cinematographers Association Awards	Best Actress	Won	
2006	Tananam Tananam	Udaya Film Award	Best Actress	Won	
2008	Mussanje Maatu	56th Filmfare Awards South	Best Actress	Nominated	
2008	Mussanje Maatu	Suvarna Film Awards	Best Actress	Won	
2008	Mussanje Maatu	Udaya Film Awards	Best Actress	Won	
2008	Mussanje Maatu	Suvarna Film Awards	Suvana Favorite Heroine	Won	
2010	Just Maath Maathalli	58th Filmfare Awards South	Best Actress	Nominated	
2010	Just Maath Maathalli	Suvarna Film Awards	Best Actress	Nominated	
2010	Just Maath Maathalli	Udaya Film Awards	Best Actress	Nominated	
2010	Just Maath Maathalli	Suvarna Film Awards	Suvana Favorite Heroine	Won	
2011	Sanju Weds Geetha	Udaya Film Awards	Best Actress	Won	
2011	Sanju Weds Geetha	59th Filmfare Awards South	Best Actress	Won	
2011	Sanju Weds Geetha	2010–11 Karnataka State Film Awards	Best Actress	Won	
2011	Sanju Weds Geetha	Suvarna Film Awards	Best Actress	Won	
2011	Sanju Weds Geetha	Suvarna Film Awards	Suvana Favorite Heroine	Won	
2011	Sanju Weds Geetha	1st SIIMA Awards	SIIMA Best Actress	Won	
2012	Sidlingu	60th Filmfare Awards South	Best Actress	Nominated	
2012	Sidlingu	Udaya Film Award	Best Actress	Won	
2012	Sidlingu	Suvarna Film Awards	Best Actress	Won	
2012	Sidlingu	2nd SIIMA Awards	SIIMA Best Actress	Nominated	
2023	Swathi Mutthina Male Haniye	69th Filmfare Awards South	Best Film	Nominated	
