= Aryan (2014 film) =

- Theatrical release poster
- Directed by: D. Rajendra Babu; Chi Guru Dutt
- Screenplay by: D. Rajendra Babu
- Story by: D. Rajendra Babu
- Produced by: Dhruv Das
- Starring: Shiva Rajkumar; Ramya
- Narrated by: Sudeep
- Cinematography: Chandrashekar
- Music by: Jassie Gift
- Production company: Dreamweaver Entertainment
- Distributed by: Dreamweaver Entertainment
- Release date: 1 August 2014
- Running time: 117 minutes
- Country: India
- Language: Kannada

Aryan is a 2014 Indian Kannada-language sports drama film. Initially directed by D. Rajendra Babu, who died while filming half-way, the responsibility of directing the film went to Chi Guru Dutt. The film was produced by Dhruv Das under the banner Dreamweaver Entertainment and stars Shiva Rajkumar and Ramya.

The movie is based on the life of Aryan (acted by Shiva Rajkumar), who is an athletics coach. His protégé, a sprint queen (acted by Ramya) goes on win a major athletics event. Against this backdrop, there is a love story between the two.

The first look and music of the film are released on 9 June 2014.

== Plot ==
Aryan (Shiva Rajkumar) is a champion Indian athlete that when an athletics coach his protégé, a sprint queen (Ramya) goes on win a major athletics event. They are in a relationship.

Before Ramya finds success as an athlete and before Aryan regains his credibility as a coach, they have to overcome obstacles: hostility, betrayal, jealousy and lust.

== Cast ==
- Shiva Rajkumar as Aryan
- Ramya as Shwetha
- Sarath Babu
- Bullet Prakash
- Sumithra Devi
- Raghu Mukherjee as Surendra Patil
- Archana Gupta as Hamsa
- Sudeep as Narrator (voice)

== Production ==
Coinciding with the birthday of Shivarajkumar's late father and Kannada cinema's most celebrated actor, Rajkumar, the filming began on 24 April 2013. While the filming was half-complete, director D. Rajendra Babu died following a heart attack. Subsequently, Chi Guru Dutt was signed in on to direct the film.

Majority of the filming has been done in Bengaluru. Sporting sequences and some other portions are shot in Singapore. The film has lavishly shot sports sequences and some beautiful dance numbers. Harsha, the well known choreographer and director is involved in the dance sequences of the film.

Actor turned director Chi Guru Dutt, son of stalwart writer of Kannada cinema Chi. Udaya Shankar took over the film after the death of D. Rajendra Babu. He started work as a dedication to the legendary Kannada director. According to him, he worked as an actor under Babu in four films. Guru Dutt admits that it is an honour and a duty to complete this film. In fact, Guru Dutt feels that the film should credit Rajendra Babu as the director of Aryan, and not him. The producer, Dhruv Das, has decided that the film will credit both names as the directors of the film.

== Soundtrack ==
The first look of the film and audio of the film was released on 9 June 2014 in a well-received ceremony. The film has received extensive coverage in Kannada media. Renowned music director, Jassie Gift has composed the music of this film. This is second film where Shivarajkumar and Jassie Gift have come together. The composition of the song "We Will Rock You" by the British rock band, Queen, was reused for the song "Bittu Bidu".

Popular Bollywood and South Indian singers such as KK, Sunidhi Chauhan, Shreya Ghoshal, Ranjith and Hariharan lent their voices to Aryan's songs.

Shiva's brother, actor Puneeth Rajkumar is also a part of the film's soundtrack.

Aryan

Soundtrack album by Jassie Gift
- Released: August 1, 2014
- Genre: Filmi
- Length: 20:38
- Label: Lahari Music
- Producer: Jassie Gift

Jassie Gift chronology
Dirty Picture: Silk Sakkath Maga (2013)	Aryan (2014)	Masala Republic (2014)

No.	Title	Lyrics	Singer(s)	Length
1.	"Bittu Bidu"	Chandan Shetty	Ranjith	3:48
2.	"Kannada Mannina"	Kaviraj	Puneeth Rajkumar, Sunidhi Chauhan	3:44
3.	"Ondu Haadu Mella Keli Banthu"	Kaviraj	KK, Shreya Ghoshal	4:25
4.	"Nee Barada Dariyalli"	Kaviraj	Hariharan	4:35
5.	"Usire Aadade"	Chandan Shetty	Shreya Ghoshal	4:19

== See also ==
- List of sports films
