= Tananam Tananam =

- DVD cover
- Directed by: Kavitha Lankesh
- Story by: Kalki Krishnamurthy
- Produced by: N. M. Suresh
- Starring: Ramya; Rakshita; Shaam
- Cinematography: A. C. Mahendran
- Edited by: M. N. Swamy
- Music by: K. Kalyan
- Production company: Sri Thulaja Bhavani Creations
- Release date: 24 November 2006
- Running time: 139 minutes
- Country: India
- Language: Kannada

Tananam Tananam is a 2006 Indian Kannada-language romantic musical film directed and written by Kavitha Lankesh. The film has Ramya and Rakshita teaming up together for the first time, and introduces Shaam, a Tamil actor, to Kannada cinema. The film was produced by N. M. Suresh and based on a Tamil short story written by Kalki.

The film released on 24 November 2006 to average and negative feedback from critics. The film eventually failed to live up to the initial hype and the director's reputation at the box-office. Despite the failure, the film won two Filmfare Awards in Best Actress and Best Lyricist categories. Noted violinist L. Subramaniam was hired to play violin bits in the film. The film premiered at International Film Festival of India upon release.

== Plot ==
Vanaja (Ramya) loves Shankar (Shaam), but he loves Bhavani (Rakshita), an actress from a travelling theatre group. When Bhavani turns him down, Shankar turns to alcohol and becomes a victim of a tragedy.

== Cast ==
- Ramya as Vanaja
- Rakshita as Bhavani
- Shaam as Shankar
- Girish Karnad as Krishnamurthy
- Bharathi Vishnuvardhan as Vanaja's mother
- Avinash as Gowda
- Daisy Bopanna a Gowda's daughter
- Sharan as Subbu
- Harish Raj as Krishnamurthy's student
- Mandeep Roy as Shankari's father

== Production ==
Leading Kannada actresses Ramya and Rakshita co-starred in this film and Bangalore based Tamil actor Shaam was cast after other actors rejected the role. Kavitha Lankesh also admitted that the story was inspired from a Tamil short story penned by Kalki. The classical music notes that comes in the film scenes have been tuned by acclaimed violinist L. Subramaniam. Girish Karnad was cast as Ramya's father. The film was launched at Shirdi Sai Baba temple near Devanahalli.

== Soundtrack ==
The music of the film was composed and lyrics written by K. Kalyan. The title track won him the Filmfare Award for Best Lyricist – Kannada for the year 2006.

No.	Title	Singer(s)	Length
1.	"Kande Kande Govindana"	K. S. Chithra, Ajay Warrior	4:50
2.	"Cheluvantha Rajakumari"	Kunal Ganjawala, K. S. Chithra	4:31
3.	"Chapparisu"	Malgudi Subha, Hemanth Kumar	4:38
4.	"Koogalatheya Dooradalli"	S. P. Balasubrahmanyam, K. S. Chithra	5:28
5.	"Kalitha Hudugi"	Gururaj Hosakote	2:16
6.	"Preethi Endarenu"	Kunal Ganjawala	4:16
7.	"Tananam Tananam"	K. S. Chithra	4:55

== Reception ==
A critic from Rediff gave the film a rating of one-and-half out of five stars and stated that "But halfway through Tananam Tananam, you realise Kavitha Lankesh has derailed the story, and nothing really works in favour of the film". A critic from The Hindu gave the film a negative review and cited that "nothing is right about Tananam Tananam". A critic from Sify opined that "Kavitha Lankesh, touted to be an intelligent director, this time falls flat with Thananam Thananam as the film lacks a new story and the film is lengthy and slow moving".

== Awards ==
Award	Category	Recipient	Ref.
Filmfare Awards South	Best Actress	Ramya	
Filmfare Awards South	Best Lyricist	K. Kalyan	
South Indian Cinematographers Association	Best Actress	Ramya	
