= Jagadam =

- Directed by: Sukumar
- Written by: Sukumar
- Produced by: Aditya Babu
- Starring: Ram Pothineni; Isha Sahani; Pradeep Rawat; Prakash Raj
- Cinematography: R. Rathnavelu
- Edited by: A. Sreekar Prasad
- Music by: Devi Sri Prasad
- Release date: 16 March 2007
- Running time: 163 minutes
- Country: India
- Language: Telugu

Jagadam (transl. Quarrel) is a 2007 Indian Telugu-language action film written and directed by Sukumar. The film stars Ram Pothineni, Isha Sahani, Pradeep Rawat and Prakash Raj. The film was produced by Aditya Babu.

It was released on 16 March 2007. Upon release, it received mixed reviews from both the critics and audience. The performance of Ram, direction, music, cinematography, editing and action sequences received acclaim. However, the story and screenplay received criticism for being routine. Though, it failed at the box-office. Over the years, it gained a huge cult following for Ram's performance, music, and direction. It is now regarded as one of the best films of Sukumar.

== Plot ==
Seenu enjoys fights since his childhood. He appreciates violence and wants to be like Manikyam, a goonda, as everyone, including his teacher, is afraid of him. When all the boys wanted to become engineers, doctors, lawyers, and other professions, Seenu wanted to become a goonda. Though he behaves like a ruffian, he learns that one should have the support of a politician or big dada. With the help of Laddu, an associate of Manikyam, Seenu meets the latter and joins his gang. At this juncture, Seenu falls in love with Subbalakshmi. As she pleads with Seenu to help her friend's father, Seenu agrees to settle a land deal, but the land was under illegal occupation of Manikyam's gang member. As he promised to settle the deal, Seenu opposes Manikyam. This makes Seenu a hero, and he starts doing settlements on his own. Once, he agrees to help an industrialist, whose quarry was occupied by Yadav, with Manikyam's support. As things go out of control, Seenu decides to kill Yadav but could not. However, Seenu's young brother, who also likes fighting scenes, takes a gun and shoots Yadav. Seenu appeals to the police commissioner to mediate with Manikyam, but his men kill Seenu's brother. This irks Seenu, who thrashes Manikyam but spares him. He realizes that violence is not the way to go. When Manikyam attacks him, he kills him in self-defense. The film ends on a happy note with Seenu leaving all the dadagiri and leading a normal life.

== Cast ==
- Ram Pothineni as Macha Srinivas "Seenu"
- Isha Sahani as Subbalakshmi "Seenu", Seenu's girlfriend
- Pradeep Rawat as Manikyam
- Prakash Raj as Police Commissioner (cameo)
- A. S. Ravikumar Chowdary as Laddu
- Satya Prakash as Yadav
- Raghu Babu as Macha Balram, Seenu's father
- Saranya as Seenu's mother
- Venu Yeldandi as Nalla Mallesh, Seenu's friend
- Dhanraj as Nampalli Satti, Seenu's friend
- Ramesh as Seenu's friend
- Chitram Srinu as Vaali, Seenu's friend
- Tanikella Bharani as PVR, MLA
- Narsing Yadav as Police Officer
- Telangana Shakuntala as Corporator
- Duvvasi Mohan as Jaffer Anna
- Jogi Krishnan Raju as Journalist Sattibabu
- Venu Madhav
- Prudhviraj
- Jagadam Naveen
- Zabyn Khan as item number in the song "Mu Mu Mudhante Chedha"
- Antara Biswas as an item number in the song "36-24-36"
- Madhu Shalini as item number in the song "36-24-36"

== Soundtrack ==
The film has six songs composed by Devi Sri Prasad. Music got a good response from public.

Jagadam

Soundtrack album by Devi Sri Prasad
- Released: 20 January 2007
- Recorded: 2007
- Genre: Soundtrack
- Length: 30:13
- Label: Aditya Music
- Producer: Devi Sri Prasad

Devi Sri Prasad chronology
Rakhi (2006)	Jagadam (2007)	Aata (2007)

Track-List
No.	Title	Lyrics	Singer(s)	Length
1.	"Violence is a Fashion"	Chandrabose	Devi Sri Prasad	4:44
2.	"36-24-36"	Sahithi	Mamta Mohandas	5:51
3.	"5 Feet 8 Inches"	Chandrabose	Tippu, Priya	5:08
4.	"Everybody Rock Your Body"	Chandrabose	Ranjith	5:06
5.	"Mu Mu Mudhante Chedha"	Chandrabose	Sunitha Upadrashta, Tippu	4:46
6.	"36-24-36 (Remix)"	Sahithi	Mamta Mohandas	4:38
Total length:				30:13

== Reception ==
The film received mixed reviews. Sify gave the film three stars out of five, calling Jagadam a "not a plot driven film." While praising the film for its cinematography and music, the reviewer criticized its weak script and lackluster characters. Rediff.com, however, appreciated Sukamar's screenplay and direction. Idlebrain.com, while commending Sukumar for taking up a different theme, criticized the film for a slow-paced second half and a weak climax.
