= Chithiram Pesuthadi =

2006 film by Mysskin

- Theatrical release poster
- Directed by: Mysskin
- Written by: Mysskin
- Produced by: S. N. Ezilan; Lv Srikanth Lakshman; V. Vijayan
- Starring: Narain; Bhavana
- Cinematography: Mahesh Muthuswami
- Edited by: M. Kasi Viswanathan
- Music by: Sundar C. Babu
- Production company: Dreambridge Productions
- Release date: 10 February 2006
- Running time: 166 minutes
- Country: India
- Language: Tamil
- Budget: ₹1.25 crore
- Box office: ₹8-10 crore

Chithiram Pesuthadi (transl. The Picture Speaks, Dear) is a 2006 Indian Tamil-language romantic action drama film written and directed by Mysskin in his directorial debut. The film stars Malayalam actors Narain and Bhavana, both making their debut in Tamil cinema. The music was composed by debutant Sundar C. Babu with cinematography by Mahesh Muthuswami and editing by M. Kasi Viswanathan.

Produced by Dreambridge Productions, Chithiram Pesuthadi was released on 10 February 2006. The film initially had a poor box office run but soon became a major success after favourable word of mouth, V. Ravichandran buying the distribution rights and aggressively marketing it, especially one of its songs. The film was remade in Telugu as Raju Bhai (2007), and in Kannada as Kiccha Huccha (2010). An unrelated film Chithiram Pesuthadi 2, produced by the same production company, was released in 2019.

== Plot ==
Thirunavukarasu "Thiru", a fearless karateka, saves the son of a local don from being killed by members of a rival gang. In return, the don Annachi hires Thiru as his henchman. Thiru's mother and younger sister dislike his association with the gang but have to live with his decision.

One day, Thiru stumbles upon Charumathi, aka Charu, a worker at an NGO who fights injustice. A quarrel ensues between them, and they grow to dislike each other. Nobody has spoken up to Thiru before, and he admires Charu's courage. Whenever they bump into one another, Charu berates Thiru for being a gangster. Ashamed, Thiru and a few of the gangsters try to turn over a new leaf by selling toys at a sidewalk.

Charu is impressed by Thiru's changed personality and decides to marry him. Her father (Raviprakash) gives her his blessings, though her uncle (Mahadevan) does not approve. However, her hopes are shattered after she witnesses a naked Thiru being clumped away in a police truck from a brothel after a raid. She gives up her plans of being with him and blames her father for not raising her well enough to make the right decision. Later that day, her father commits suicide. Charu blames Thiru for ruining her life and causing her father's death. Thiru and his friends return to Annachi.

Charu's uncle arranges for her to be married to his own relative. However, Annachi's son sees Charu during her engagement and falls in love with her. Annachi threatens Charu's uncle to surrender his niece to him. After learning that Thiru is part of Annachi's gang, Charu goes to confront him. Thiru's friends reveal that he was only at the brothel that day to save his friend's family, who lives there. Instead, he sees Charu's father there, who was in the company of prostitutes. To give time for Charu's father to flee the area, Thiru created a distraction by attacking the police officers. They beat him up and tore him off his clothes while trying to arrest him. Charu realises her mistake and asks Thiru's friends to take her to him.

Meanwhile, Thiru has devised his own plans in an attempt to thwart Annachi's plans and save Charu. He has arranged for his friends to bring Charu and her fiancé separately to the registrar's office to get them married. However, Annachi shows up and orders his men to attack Thiru. When Charu arrives at the scene, she is overwhelmed to see that Thiru has been stabbed and is fighting for his life. Only then does Annachi realise that she and Thiru are in love. He stops the attack and lets Thiru's friends rush him to the hospital. Thiru is saved, and Annachi agrees to let him go. He marries Charu, and they live happily ever after.

== Cast ==
- Narain as Thirunavukarasu "Thiru"
- Bhavana as Charumathi "Charu"
- Kadhal Dhandapani as Annachi
- Mahadevan as Charu's uncle
- Raviprakash as Charu's father
- Sathyapriya as Thiru's mother
- Vasantha Narayan
- Ajayan Bala
- Jaya Madhan
- Singaga Sukumaran
- Malavika (special appearances in the song "Valameenukkum")
- Gana Ulaganathan (special appearance in the song "Valameenukkum")

== Production ==
Chithiram Pesuthadi marked the directorial debut of Mysskin. It is the Tamil debut of Malayalam actors Sunil and Bhavana; the former later became known as Narain. The film's title was derived from a song from Sabaash Meena (1958). Mysskin said he wrote the script with Vijay in mind for the lead role, but later decided against casting him as he believed Vijay would have demanded storyline changes. The name of the lead actress's character Charu is an homage to Charulata (1964) directed by Satyajit Ray.

== Soundtrack ==
The film's score and soundtrack were composed by Sundar C. Babu, who made his debut in film scoring through this film.

Track listing
No.	Title	Lyrics	Singer(s)	Length
1.	"Idam Porul Parthu"	Kabilan	Karthik, Sujatha Mohan	4:24
2.	"Henchman Theme" (Instrumental)	—	—	0:58
3.	"Pattam Poochi"	Kabilan	Timmy, Ranjith	4:39
4.	"Love Theme" (Instrumental)	—	—	1:22
5.	"Aaahayam Aaahayam"	Mysskin	Hariharan	4:27
6.	"Idhu Enna Pudhu Kanavo" (female)	Mysskin	Manju Haridas	1:49
7.	"Mazhai Mazhai"	Mysskin	Afsal	3:55
8.	"Voice Of Heart Theme" (Instrumental)	—	—	1:52
9.	"Vazha Meenu"	Gana Ulaganathan	Gana Ulaganathan	4:44
10.	"Life is Beautiful Theme" (Instrumental)	—	—	1:10
11.	"Idhu Enna Pudhu Kanavo" (male)	Mysskin	Vijay Gopal	1:51
12.	"Aalaap"	—	Vijay Gopal	0:42
Total length:				29:01

== Release ==
Released on 10 February 2006, Chithiram Pesuthadi initially performed poorly at the box office, and was removed from almost all theatres within two weeks of its release. However, after V. Ravichandran saw and liked the film, he bought the distribution rights from Dreambridge for ₹1.75 crore (equivalent to ₹6.1 crore or US$640,000 in 2026) and spent a separate ₹1 crore (equivalent to ₹3.5 crore or US$360,000 in 2026) on publicity and marketing. When re-released, the film gained much more attention, with the song "Vazha Meenu" in particular being aggressively marketed.

Mysskin said he felt "insulted" by the notion that Chithiram Pesuthadi succeeded only because of the song's marketing, noting that the film's initial underperformance stemmed from it being overshadowed by other bigger releases in the same week, with only eight people attending the first screening. He said all eight people told him they liked the film; this favourable word of mouth led to increased audiences in the second week of release, and Mysskin claimed it was only then that the song's aggressive marketing began.

== Critical reception ==
Sify wrote, "Promising start precede big blunders. The first half an hour of Chitirram Pesuthadi builds up your hope of seeing a good gangster movie but it all comes crashing down as the film drags on at snail pace and finally ends with a whimper". Malini Mannath of Chennai Online wrote, "It's an oft-repeated plot that the director (apprenticed under Kathir and Vincent Selva) has chosen for his debut film — it is about a don, his favourite henchman and the henchman's girl. But Misskin's effort to give a slight variation in his presentation, lacing his screenplay with subtle humour, and not letting the pace slow down with some inane comedy track has turned it into a fairly engaging film".

G. Ulaganathan of Deccan Herald wrote, "The story is nothing new, but the treatment is fresh. Mysskin depends on his story and screenplay— not big stars, or famous music directors. Of course, songs are there but they are part of the story. The climax is rivetting and needs to be seen on the big screen to feel the impact". Malathi Rangarajan of The Hindu wrote, "A well-conceived story, interesting twists, intelligent treatment and subtle humour make [Chithiram Pesuthadi] an estimable exercise. There's nothing novel about the subject. But writer-director Mishkin's intelligent treatment makes a difference". Ananda Vikatan gave the film a favourable review, appreciating Bhavana's performance, the cinematography and stating despite following a formlaic one-liner, that of a ruffian hero being redeemed by the heroine, the director reinvented it through his screenplay.

== Bibliography ==
- Dhananjayan, G. (2011). The Best of Tamil Cinema, 1931 to 2010: 1977–2010. Galatta Media. OCLC 733724281.
