= K. Kalyan =

Indian Kannada lyricist, music director (born 1975)

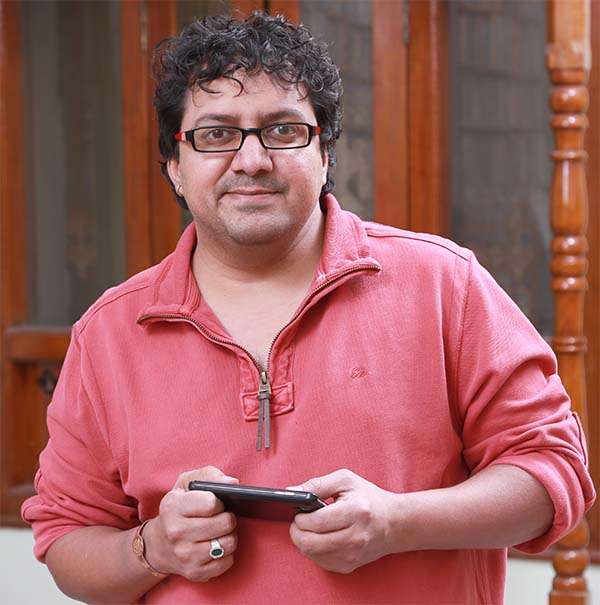
- Born: 1 January 1975 (age 51); Bengaluru, Karnataka, India
- Occupations: Song writer, music director
- Writing career
- Genres: Film, devotional

K Kalyan (born 1 January 1975) is an Indian songwriter and music composer known for his works in Kannada film industry. He is also called as "Premakavi.

== Career ==
K. Kalyan entered the Kannada film industry at the age of 17 as a music director and lyricist. He studied Carnatic classical music under Chenna Krishnappa and, early in his career, worked with music director Hamsalekha.

Kalyan has written around 3,000 songs. He has collaborated with several music directors and composers, including Ilaiyaraaja, Hamsalekha, A. R. Rahman, M. M. Keeravani, Deva, Gurukiran, V. Harikrishna, Arjun Janya, Santhosh Narayanan and others.

== Selected filmography ==
=== Songwriter ===
- Nammoora Mandara Hoove (1996)
- Amrutha Varshini (1997)
- Huccha (2001)
- Appu (2002)
- Abhi (2003)
- Aakash (2005)
- Kotigobba (2001)
- My Autograph (2006)
- Aa Dinagalu (2007)
- No 73, Shanthi Nivasa (2007)
- Tananam Tananam (2006)
- Preethi Prema Pranaya (2003)
- Akasha Gange (2008)
- Anjaniputra (2017)
- Rudra Tandava (2015)
- Ninnindale (2014)
- Bhajarangi (2013)
- Maanikya (2014)
- Gajakesari (2014)
- Sarkari Hi. Pra. Shaale, Kasaragodu, Koduge: Ramanna Rai (2018)
- Kurukshetra (2019)
- Jai Maruthi 800 (2016)
- Bhajarangi 2 (2021)
- Jugaari (2010)
- Swayam Krushi (2011)
- Gowdru Hotel (2017)
- Vajrakaya (2015)
- Rana Vikrama (2015)
- Onti (2019)
- Jhansi IPS (2023)
- Rathnan Prapancha (2021)
- Hondisi Bareyiri (2023)
- Shubhamangala (2022)

=== Composer ===
- Chandramukhi Pranasakhi (1999)
- Shrirasthu Shubhamasthu (2000)
- Love Lavike (2002)
- Lovea Illa Doveaa (2003)
- Rowdy Aliya (2004)
- Gopi (2006; score only)
- Tananam Tananam (2006)
- Manasugula Mathu Madhura (2007)
- Chikkamagaloora Chikka Mallige (2008)
- Ganga Kaveri (2008)

== Honours and awards ==
=== Karnataka State Film Awards ===
Year	Film	Category	Ref.
2003–04	Preethi Prema Pranaya	Best Lyrics	
