= Jail (2021 film) =

2021 Indian action crime film

- Theatrical release poster
- Directed by: G. Vasanthabalan
- Written by: Bakkiyam Shankar; S. Ramakrishnan
- Screenplay by: G. Vasanthabalan
- Story by: G. Vasanthabalan; S. Ramakrishnan
- Produced by: Sridharan Mariathasan
- Starring: G. V. Prakash Kumar; Abarnathi
- Cinematography: Ganesh Chandhrra
- Edited by: Raymond Derrick Crasta
- Music by: G. V. Prakash Kumar
- Production company: Krikes Cine Creations
- Distributed by: Studio Green
- Release date: 9 December 2021
- Country: India
- Language: Tamil

Jail is a 2021 Indian Tamil-language action crime film written and directed by G. Vasanthabalan. The film is produced by Sridharan Mariathasan under the production banner of Krikes Cine Creations. The film stars G. V. Prakash Kumar and debutante Abarnathi, while Pasanga Pandi, Nandhan Ram, Radhika Sarathkumar, and Ravi Mariya play supporting roles. Prakash Kumar also composed music for the film which was edited by Raymond Derrick Crasta. The film was released on 9 December 2021.

== Plot ==
Three childhood friends get thrown out of their village under the guise of resettlement. In addition to adjusting to the new reality, they must fight for their rights and strive hard to make a living.

== Cast ==
- G. V. Prakash Kumar as Karuna
- Abarnathi as Rosamalar
- Pasanga Pandi as Kalaiarasan "Kalai"
- Nandhan Ram as Rocky
- Radhika Sarathkumar as Paapamma, Karuna's mother
- Ravi Mariya as Murugaperumal "Perumal"
- Aadukalam Naren as SP Mariadas
- Saranya Ravichandran as Rani
- Jennifer as Mariapushpam
- KVN Manimegalai as Kalai's mother
- S. K. Jeeva as a police officer
- P. T. Selvakumar as Muthu, Kalai's uncle
- S. Sathyendra as Kaveri Nagar resident
- Poo Ramu as Vetrivel

== Production ==
In 2018, it was announced that G. V. Prakash would act under the direction of Vasanthabalan. Prakash started his career as composer with Vasanthabalan's film Veyil (2006). Abarnathi, who rose to fame with the reality series Enga Veetu Mapillai, made her cinematic debut as actress with this film.

== Soundtrack ==
The soundtrack was composed by G. V. Prakash Kumar. Dhanush and Aditi Rao Hydari sang one song for the film.

Track listing
No.	Title	Lyrics	Singer(s)	Length
1.	"Kaathodu Kaathanen"	Kabilan	Dhanush, Aditi Rao Hydari	5:12
2.	"Pathu Kaasu"	Arivu	G.V. Prakash Kumar	2:30
3.	"Mutta Porotta"	Gana Guna and Santosh Hariharan	Gana Ganesan	02:14
4.	"Missah Missessah"	Karunakaran	Gana Balachander, Arivu and Isaivani	03:47
5.	"Nagarodi"	Arivu	G. V. Prakash Kumar, Arivu and Ananya Bhat	04:41
6.	"Doomangoli"	Bhakiyam Shankar	Arunraja Kamaraj	03:13
7.	"Boomikku Nee Vandha"	Snehan	Ravi G. and Saindhavi	03:25
8.	"A Moment Of Trance"		G.V. Prakash Kumar	01:49
9.	"Ecstatic Folk"		G.V. Prakash Kumar	01:02
Total length:				27:51

== Critical reception ==
M. Suganth of The Times of India who gave 2.5 out of 5 stars after reviewing the film stated that "Rather than sending chills, the climax only evokes a cold indifference." Srivatsan S of The Hindu after reviewing the film stated that "In the opening credits, Vasanthabalan credits a few people for their conversations. What a wonderful gesture I thought. Perhaps there is a downside too; you shouldn’t always go by hearsay."

Sudhir Srinivasan of Cinema Express gave 2 out of 5 stars stating that "The real jail, when you are exposed to such attempts at humour in a film that’s supposed to celebrate equality and empathy, is the movie theatre." Ashameera Aiyappan of Firstpost who gave 2.5 out of 5 stated after reviewing the film that "In its writing, we see the frameworks of a strong emotional drama. But it never rises above that."
