= Sandhya (actress, born 1988) =

Indian actress (born 1988)

Kadhal Sandhya
- Born: Revathy; 27 September 1988 (age 37); Trivandrum, Kerala, India
- Occupation: Actress
- Years active: 2004–2016 2020 2025-present
- Spouse: Venkat Chandrasekhar (m. 2015)
- Children: 1

Revathy (born 27 September 1988), known by her stage name Kadhal Sandhya, is an Indian former actress who appeared mainly in Tamil film industry and in a few Malayalam, Telugu and Kannada films.

== Early life ==
She was born in the year 1988. Her father Ajith is an employee of IOB and her mother Maya is a beautician. She has an elder brother, Rahul. She attended Vidyodaya Girls Higher Secondary School, Chennai until completing Class 9.

== Career ==
Sandhya was studying when she starred in the Tamil love story Kaadhal. The role was offered to many known actresses, including Ileana D'Cruz and then Varalaxmi Sarathkumar, but the latter's father was reluctant to let her become an actress at the time. The team next picked Saranya Nag who was in Class IX, when cinematographer Vijay Milton suggested her name to Balaji Sakthivel. She was initially considered to play the heroine in the film, but finally the role was later handed to Sandhya, after the director felt Saranya looked too young.

After the success of the film Kaadhal, in 2004, she took up a Malayalam film titled Alice in Wonderland which she played as the sister of actor Jayaram. Then came the musical romance Dishyum with Jeeva. She also acted in Koodal Nagar with Bharath. After the success of Cycle, she shifted her focus to Malayalam cinema. She debuted as a playback singer for the film Manjal Veiyil. In 2010, she appeared in a role opposite Vishnuvardhan in the Kannada film Aptharakshaka directed by P. Vasu. Some of them include, Soodhattam (2013), Puzhayum Kannadiyum (2014) and Veri:Thimiru 2 (2015) and in Tamil. She has been a judge on a number of reality shows including Comedy Stars and Little Stars on Asianet. She make her small screen debut with TV show Kanmani (2020).

== Personal life ==
Sandhya married Venkat Chandrasekhar, a Chennai-based IT businessman, on 6 December 2015. The ceremony was held at Guruvayur Temple. The couple have a daughter, born on 27 September 2016.

== Filmography ==
=== Films ===
Year	Film	Role	Language	Notes
2004	Kaadhal	Aishwarya Rajendran	Tamil	Debut film Filmfare Award for Best Actress – Tamil; Tamil Nadu State Film Award Special Prize
2005	Alice in Wonderland	Alice	Malayalam	
2006	Dishyum	Cinthya Jayachandran	Tamil	Tamil Nadu State Film Award Special Prize; Nominated - Filmfare Award for Best Actress – Tamil
2006	Prajapathi	Malu	Malayalam	
2006	Vallavan	Suchitra	Tamil	
2006	Annavaram	Varalakshmi (Varam)	Telugu	Filmfare Award for Best Supporting Actress – Telugu
2007	Koodal Nagar	Thamizhselvi	Tamil	
2007	Kannamoochi Yenada	Devasena Arumugam	Tamil	
2008	Cycle	Meenkashi Kaushtubhan	Malayalam	
2008	Thoondil	Anjali Sriram	Tamil	
2008	Velli Thirai	Herself	Tamil	Cameo appearance
2008	Mahesh, Saranya Matrum Palar	Saranya	Tamil	
2009	Nanda	Kavya	Kannada	
2009	Manjal Veiyil	Gayathri	Tamil	
2009	Odipolaama	Anjali	Tamil	
2010	Aptharakshaka	Gowri	Kannada	
2010	Irumbukkottai Murattu Singam	Thumbi	Tamil	
2010	Haasini	Haasini	Telugu	
2010	College Days	Anu	Malayalam	
2010	Sahasram	Supriya, Sridevi	Malayalam	
2011	Traffic	Adithi	Malayalam	
2011	Three Kings	Manju	Malayalam	
2011	D - 17	Sandhya	Malayalam	
2012	Masters	Nia Ponnoose	Malayalam	
2012	Veendum Kannur	Radhika	Malayalam	
2012	Padmasree Bharat Dr. Saroj Kumar	Actress	Malayalam	Special appearance
2012	The Hitlist	Gouri Vikram	Malayalam	
2013	Benki Birugali	Sandhya	Kannada	
2013	Paisa Paisa	Kumudam	Malayalam	
2013	Ya Ya	Kanaka	Tamil	
2013	For Sale	Diana	Malayalam	
2013	Soodhattam	—N/a	Tamil	
2013	Second Innings	—N/a	Malayalam	
2014	My Dear Mummy	Sandra	Malayalam	
2014	Long Sight	—N/a	Malayalam	
2014	Paris Payyans	—N/a	Malayalam	
2014	Puzhayum Kannadiyum	—N/a	Malayalam	
2015	Thunai Mudhalvar	Rukmani	Tamil	
2015	Kaththukkutti	Item dancer	Tamil	Special appearance
2015	Veri:Thimiru 2	—N/a	Tamil	
2016	Vettah	Sherin Melvin	Malayalam	
2016	Avarude Veedu	Veena	Malayalam	
2016	Ruthravathi	—N/a	Tamil	

=== Television series ===
Year	Serial	Character	Channel	Language	Ref.
2020	Kanmani	Kanmani	Sun TV	Tamil	
2025	Manasellam	Sandhya	Zee Tamil	Tamil	
