= Abarnathi =

Indian actress

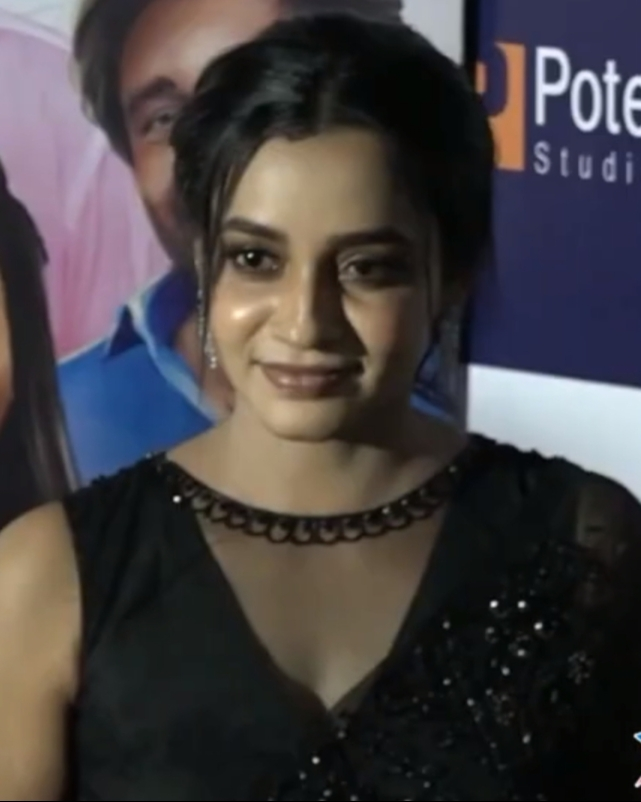
- Born: Kumbakonam, Tamil Nadu, India
- Occupations: Actress, model
- Years active: 2018–present

Abarnathi is an Indian actress who has appeared in Tamil films. She made her debut with Thaen (2021) and get well known of her characters in Jail (2021) and Irugapatru (2023). She was one of the contestants of reality television show Enga Veetu Mapillai (2018) before entering the film industry.

== Early life ==
Abarnathi was born in Kumbakonam, Studied in Neelan Matric Hr. Sec. School – Needamangalam but raised in Chennai. As a college student she studied fashion design.

== Career ==
Abarnathi made her debut in television as a reality television contestant with Enga Veetu Mapillai (2018), starring Arya. During her stint on the show, she garnered attention for her attitude and the way she addressed Arya. Despite not making it to the finals of the show, she eventually received offers to work as an actress.

In mid-2018, Abarnathi signed on to work as the female lead of Vasanthabalan's Jail (2021) opposite G. V. Prakash Kumar. The film, based on rowdyism in North Chennai, had a delayed release three years later. Her performance in Thaen won her a nomination for Best Debut Actress, while she played a housewife in Udanpaal (2022). She later appeared in Demon (2023) and the anthology film Irugapatru (2023).

Abarnathi was also seen in Mayaputhagam opposite Srikanth and Narkarappor opposite Lingesh.

== Filmography ==
Films

Year	Title	Role	Notes
2021	Jail	Rosamalar	
2021	Thaen	Poongodi	
2022	Udanpaal	Prema	
2023	Demon	Karthika	
2023	Irugapatru	Pavithra	
2024	Saamaniyan	Manisha	
2024	Maya Puthagam	Panchamadevi	
2026	Vengeance	Veni	
2026	Kaalidas 2	Sanju	
2026	The Grand Master	Vellaiyamma	

Television

Year	Title	Role	Channel	Notes
2018	Enga Veetu Mapillai	Contestant	Colors Tamil	

== Accolades ==
Year	Award	Film	Result	Ref.
2020	SIIMA Award for Best Female Debut – Tamil	Thaen	Nominated	
2020	Tamil Nadu State Film Award Special Prize Best Actress	Thaen	Won	
2024	JFW Award for Best Supporting Actress	Irugapatru	Won	
