= Koodal Nagar =

- Poster
- Directed by: Seenu Ramasamy
- Written by: Seenu Ramasamy
- Produced by: Senthil Kumar; P. S. Ganesh
- Starring: Bharath; Bhavana; Sandhya
- Cinematography: M. S. Prabhu
- Edited by: V. T. Vijayan
- Music by: Sabesh–Murali
- Production company: Annamalai Films
- Release date: 5 April 2007
- Running time: 126 minutes
- Country: India
- Language: Tamil

Koodal Nagar is a 2007 Indian Tamil-language film written and directed by first-timer Seenu Ramasamy. The film stars Bharath in dual lead roles with Bhavana and Sandhya. The film opened in 5 April 2007 and performed below average at the box office. It is the only film where Bharath played a dual role in his career.

== Plot ==
The story is set in a suburb of Madurai. Suriyan and Chandran are twins. Suriyan, the elder of the two, is a soft-spoken guy who works at a local lending library and falls in love with Manimekalai, the daughter of Namasivayam, a local politician-don and MLA. Chandran, the younger one, works as a mortuary assistant in a local government hospital, and he is one of Namasivayam's men who are in charge of his election campaign. Chandran is romantically linked to a local girl named Tamizhselvi. Namasivayam learns of his daughter's love affair with Suriyan and orders his men to kill Suriyan. However, they accidentally attack Chandran, who escapes from them. Later, Chandran visits Manimekalai and requests that she forget his brother. Nevertheless, she plans to elope with Suriyan. They go away and wait for the bus. Once the bus arrives, Suryan approaches it, only to be struck by a knife to the head by Namasivayam's goons, who have learned about the plan and have come to kill Suriyan. They take Manimekalai and leave. Chandran is later shocked to learn that the dead body, which came into the mortuary for preparation for burial, is none other than his own brother. Enraged by this, he cycles to Namasivayam's house to kill him. But their gardener prevents him from doing anything brash. Chandran later goes to an out-of-town lodge where Namasivayam stays. His goons check Chandran thoroughly and let him go up to meet Namasivayam. He cries in front of Namasivayam, saying their political opponents have killed his brother, mistaken as him. Namasivayam pretends to call the police and a judge to sort things out. Chandran then leaves, and the next day, Manimekalai commits suicide by hanging herself from the ceiling fan in her bedroom. Namasivayam goes to the mortuary to pay respect to Suriyan's body. Once he is paying respect, the body, that was actually Chandran, gets up and kills Namasivayam and two of his goons, thereby avenging Suriyan's and Manimekalai's deaths. Tamizhselvi helps him to complete his revenge by closing the doors of the mortuary and not letting the other goons in. All the women who flocked to the scene hit the other goons and chase them away. Later, Chandran and Tamizhselvi are arrested by the police.

== Cast ==
- Bharath in a dual role as:
  - Suriyan
  - Chandran
- Bhavana as Manimekalai
- Sandhya as Tamizhselvi
- Mahadevan as Namasivayam
- Ilavarasu
- Meera Krishnan
- Periya Karuppu Thevar
- Manobala as Doctor
- Thennavan
- Indhu
- Bava Lakshmanan
- Cheran Raj
- Vaigai Balan
- Theni Murugan
- Seenu Ramasamy as Bus Conductor (cameo appearance)

== Production ==
Production work for the film began in late 2004, with Sandhya signed up to portray a role even before the release of her first film, Kadhal (2004). The first schedule was held at Madurai then shifted to Dindigul where a fight scene was picturised and a set resembling village was built there. The filming was also held at Karaikudi and Kodaikanal.

== Soundtrack ==
The soundtrack was composed by Sabesh–Murali. The audio was launched at Radha Park Inn. Saraswathy Srinivasa of Rediff.com wrote, "Overall, the album just doles out routine fare".

Track listing
No.	Title	Singer(s)	Length
1.	"Tamil Selvi Tamil Selvi"	Hariharan, Sadhana Sargam
2.	"Vaarrar Ayya Vaarraru"	Thulasidhas
3.	"Yaarathu Yaarathu"	Haricharan, Swetha
4.	"Yakka Nillukka"	Karthik
5.	"Aayiram Thalaiyapaathu"	Tippu
6.	"Kaalgal Munnalae"	Chandre

== Critical reception ==
Malathi Rangarajan of The Hindu wrote that Koodal Nagar "is well begun and well done too, for most part of the way — till the climax, to be specific. At which point writer-director Seenu Ramasamy churns out the usual finale you've witnessed in ever so many films. Having apprenticed under the likes of Balu Mahendra and Seeman, Seenu Ramasamy shows that he is a technician worth taking note of. The natural flavour in the narration is an interesting aspect of Koodal Nagar". Lajjavathi of Kalki praised Bharath's acting, Sabesh–Murali's music, Prabhu's cinematography and added in the second half love dominated the film which could have been avoided and the film's resemblance to Kaadhal and Veyil is evident.

Sify wrote, "Cheenu Ramasamy's debut film Koodal Nagar is a brave and gritty film that touches your heart strings. The film is clearly fashioned after all those films set in Madurau milieu and its surrounding areas about unfulfilled love stories ( Kathal ) and brother sentiments ( Veyil ). But what makes Koodal Nagar worth a look is its treatment and presentation that Cheenu has been able to give along with a riveting performance from Bharat". Malini Mannath of Chennai Online wrote, "No doubt there is room for much improvement here. But what is commendable is the director's effort to try a different track from the routine fare and keep the happenings fairly engaging".
