= Vishwavidhaata =

- Poster
- Directed by: Farogh Siddique
- Written by: Talat Rekhi
- Story by: Suresh Chandra Menon
- Produced by: Yasin Latiwala
- Starring: Jackie Shroff; Ayesha Jhulka; Sharad Kapoor; Pooja Batra; Ashish Vidyarthi; Arjun
- Cinematography: Teja
- Edited by: Suresh Chaturvedi
- Music by: A. R. Rahman (Songs) (Re-used from Pudhiya Mugam); Naresh Sharma (Background Score)
- Release date: 25 July 1997
- Country: India
- Language: Hindi

Vishwavidhaata is a 1997 Hindi-language film directed by Farogh Siddique starring Jackie Shroff, Ayesha Jhulka, Sharad Kapoor, Pooja Batra, Arjun and Ashish Vidyarthi. The film is shot in India and Sharjah. It is a loose remake of the Tamil film Pudhiya Mugam, written by Suresh Chandra Menon. The film features songs composed by A. R. Rahman, re-used by him from Pudhiya Mugam.

== Plot ==
Jai Verma (Sharad Kapoor) lives in Bombay. He is an honest, unemployed youth who cannot arrange for his mother's treatment. He happens to meet underworld goons looking for such frustrated people, and they force him into the world of terrorism. Rai Bahadur (Ashish Vidyarthi), the uncrowned king of terrorism, orders Jai to be killed when he revolts. Jai flees to Sharjah and undergoes plastic surgery to begin a new life. He returns to India as Ajay Khanna (Jackie Shroff), meets his wife Radha (Ayesha Jhulka), and marries her. They have a baby boy, Ravi Khanna (Sharad Kapoor). Ravi's parents want him to become a police officer to do away with traitors, but they themselves end up becoming a target instead.

== Cast ==
- Jackie Shroff as Ajay Khanna
- Ayesha Jhulka as Radha Khanna
- Sharad Kapoor as Jai Verma/Ravi Khanna
- Pooja Batra as Poonam
- Ashish Vidyarthi as Rai Bahadur
- Arjun as Goon
- Rakesh Bedi as Johnny
- Jatin Kanakia
- Shehzad Khan

== Soundtrack ==
Vishwa Vidhaata

Soundtrack album by A R Rahman
- Released: May 1997 (India)
- Recorded: 1992 (Original Version); 1997 (Hindi Version)
- Studio: Panchathan Record Inn; AM Studios
- Genre: Feature film soundtrack
- Label: Bombino
- Producer: A. R. Rahman

A R Rahman chronology
Ratchagan (1997)	Vishwa Vidhaata (1997)	Kabhi Na Kabhi (1997)

The film features songs composed by A. R. Rahman, re-used from Pudhiya Mugam. Rahman was upset with the producers since the music was re-used in the film without his permission. The lyrics were written by P. K. Mishra and Mehboob for Humdum Pyaara Pyaara.

Song	Artist(s)	Duration	Notes
"Sambo Sambo"	Kavita Krishnamurthy, Malgudi Subha	4:03	Reused "Sambo Sambo" from Pudhiya Mugam
"Kal Nahi Tha Woh"	Sujatha Mohan	5:08	Reused "Netru Illadha Maatram" from Pudhiya Mugam
"Kal Nahi Tha Woh (Sad)"	Sujatha Mohan, Hariharan	3:56	Reused "Idhu Thaan Vazhkai" from Pudhiya Mugam
"Nazron Ke Milne Se"	Kavita Krishnamurthy	4:24	Reused "Kannukku Mai Azhagu" from Pudhiya Mugam
"Jaan Tum Ho Meri"	S. P. Balasubrahmanyam, Anupama	4:30	Reused "July Madham Vandhaal" from Pudhiya Mugam
"Kaliyon Se Palkhen Hain"	Hariharan	4:24	Reused "Kannukku Mai Azhagu" from Pudhiya Mugam
"Humdum Pyaara Pyaara"	Udit Narayan, Kavita Krishnamurthy	6:11	Not by A. R. Rahman. The composer of this song is mentioned as only "Bombino Music" in the CD inlay card, while the composer isn't specifically mentioned.

== Critical reception ==
Screen wrote "You wish the director had seen Face/Off before he ventured to make this film. [..] But unfortunately for Vishwa Vidhaata, you start picking anachronistic holes right from the very beginning, and no character manages to hold your interest, let alone intrigue you."
