= Grandmaster (comics) =

Grandmaster, in comics, may refer to:

- Grandmaster (DC Comics), fictional character, a type of Manhunter agent, in the DC Comics universe. First appeared in 1987
- Grandmaster (Marvel Comics), fictional character, one of the "elders of the universe" in the Marvel Comics universe. First appeared in 1969
- Grand Master Robo, supervillain against Super Commando Dhruva in the Indian Raj Comics universe

== See also ==
- Grandmaster (disambiguation)
