= Dance song =

Dance song may refer to:

- A danceable song; see dance music
- A song concerning itself almost entirely with a particular dance; in most cases most or all of the song lyric is given over to instructions for the associated dance, for example:
  - "Hokey cokey" (known as "Hokey pokey" in the United States, Canada, Ireland, Australia, the Caribbean and Mexico)
- "Dance Song", a song by Sam C. S. from the 2026 Indian film Kaalidas 2

== See also ==
- Novelty and fad dances
- Category:Dance music songs
- "The Dance-Song" from Thus Spoke Zarathustra
- "Dance Song '97", a song by Sleater-Kinney from the album Dig Me Out
- Competitive dance music
