= 14th Ananda Vikatan Cinema Awards =

- Date: 04 January 2023
- Site: Chennai, Tamil Nadu, India

Highlights
- Best Picture: Jai Bhim

The 14th Ananda Vikatan Cinema Awards ceremony honoring the winners and nominees of the best of Tamil cinema in 2020-2021 is an event that was held on 04 January 2023 in Chennai, India.

== Awards and nominations ==
Best Film	Best Director
Jai Bhim	T. J. Gnanavel – Jai Bhim
Best Actor	Best Actress
Suriya – Soorarai Pottru, Jai Bhim	Lijomol Jose – Jai Bhim
Best Supporting Actor	Best Supporting Actress
Pasupathy – Sarpatta Parambarai	Urvashi – Soorarai Pottru
Best Villain - Male	Best Villain - Female
S. J. Suryah – Maanaadu	NOT AWARDED
Best Comedian - Male	Best Comedian - Female
Redin Kingsley – Doctor	NOT AWARDED
Best Child Artist	Best Debut Director
Mukesh - Mandela	Madonne Ashwin – Mandela
Best Debut - Male	Best Debut - Female
Hakkim Shahjahan – Kadaseela Biriyani	Abarnathi – Thaen
Best Music Director	Best Lyricist
Anirudh Ravichander – Master, Doctor	Thamarai – "Yaar Azhaippadhu" – Maara
Best Playback Singer – Male	Best Playback Singer – Female
Kapil Kapilan – "Adiye" – Bachelor	Kidakkuzhi Mariyammal – "Kandaa Vara Sollunga" – Karnan
Best Story	Best Screenplay
P. Virumaandi – Ka Pae Ranasingam	Venkat Prabhu – Maanaadu
Best Dialogue	Best Production Design
Mari Selvaraj – Karnan	T. Ramalingam – Sarpatta Parambarai, Karnan
Best Cinematography	Best Editing
Tanveer Mir – Psycho	Praveen K. L. – Maanaadu
Best Stunt	Best Dance Choreography
Stunt Silva – Master	Dinesh – "Vaathi Coming" -Master
Best Costume Design	Best Make Up
Aegan Ekambaram – Sarpatta Parambarai	Dasarathan– Sarpatta Parambarai
Best Crew	Best Production
Karnan	A P Productions – Thaen
Most Popular Film	Best Entertainer
Doctor	Sivakarthikeyan

== Superlatives ==
Multiple wins
Awards	Film
4	Jai Bhim
4	Sarpatta Parambarai
4	Karnan
3	Doctor
3	Maanaadu
3	Master
2	Thaen
2	Mandela

== See also ==
- Ananda Vikatan Cinema Awards
- List of Tamil films of 2020
- List of Tamil films of 2021
