= Nanda (film) =

- DVD cover
- Directed by: R. Anantha Raju
- Written by: Maheen
- Screenplay by: R. Anantha Raju
- Produced by: Maheen
- Starring: Shiva Rajkumar; Sandhya
- Cinematography: Ramesh Babu
- Edited by: S. Manohar
- Music by: V. Manohar
- Release date: 23 January 2009
- Country: India
- Language: Kannada

Nanda is a 2009 Indian Kannada-language film directed by R. Anantha Raju and starring Shiva Rajkumar and Sandhya.

== Cast ==
- Shiva Rajkumar as Nanda
- Sandhya as Kavya
- Rangayana Raghu as Bhai Jaan
- Sharath Lohithaswa as Ranganath
- Avinash as Khaderbahi
- Srinath
- Shobaraj
- Sharan
- Kishore
- Mahin
- Bhavya
- Vanitha Vasu
- Zakeer

== Production ==
Sandhya made her Kannada debut through this film after Mayoora starring Puneeth Rajkumar was dropped after Sobhan died.

== Soundtrack ==
The music for the film and soundtracks were composed by V. Manohar. The album has five tracks.

Track listing
| No. | Title | Lyrics | Singer(s) | Length |
|---|---|---|---|---|
| 1. | "Aakasa Aagale" | Jayanth Kaikini | Rajesh Krishnan, Nanditha | 4:44 |
| 2. | "Chingaari Chingaari" | V. Manohar | Vijay Prakash | 5:20 |
| 3. | "Yaava Kadegu" | V. Manohar | Chinmayee, Akanksha Badami | 5:23 |
| 4. | "Ninna Kangalalli" | Shivananje Gowda | Udit Narayan, Akanksha Badami | 4:33 |
| 5. | "O Idenaythu" | Maheen | Keshav Krishna | 5:23 |
| Total length: | | | | 25:22 |

== Reception ==
A critic from Rediff.com wrote that "The film made by Anantha Raju fails to showcase any freshness in the actor's performance". A critic from The Times of India said that "It's a Shivrajkumar show all the way in this movie directed by Anantharaju".
