= Filmfare Critics Award for Best Actor – Tamil =

Indian annual film award

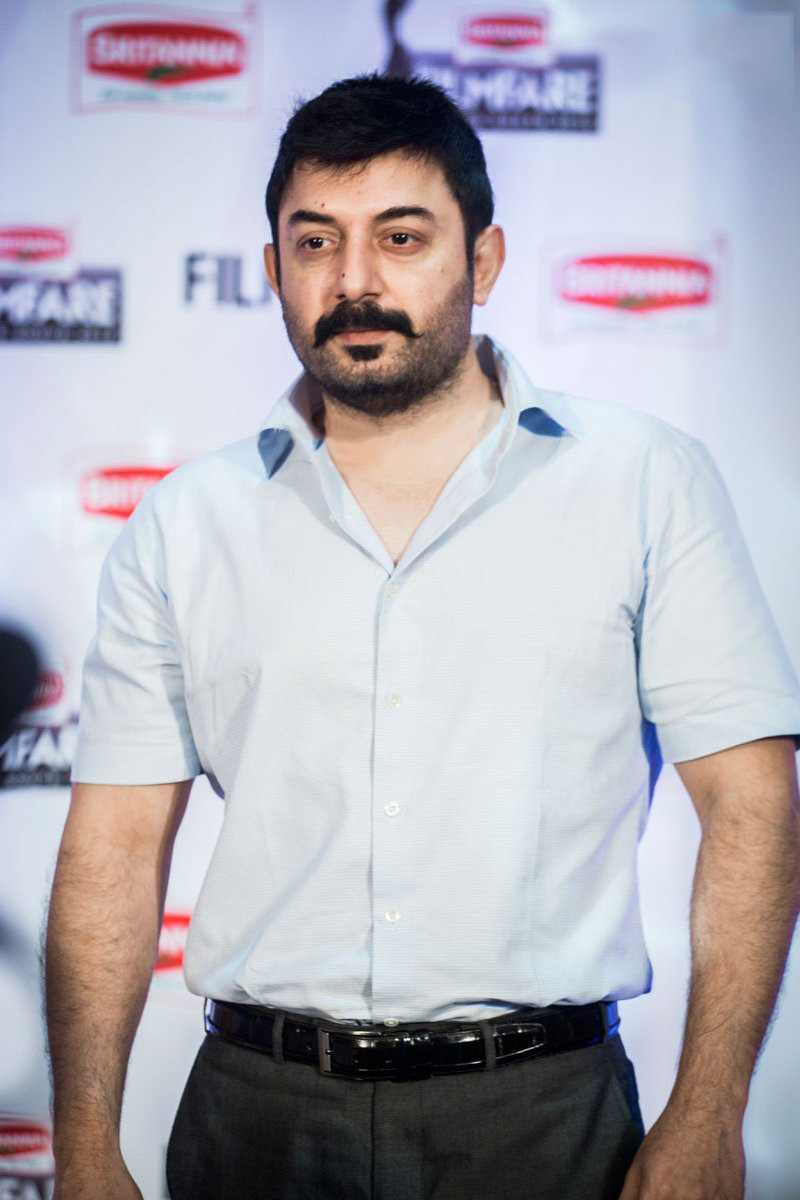
- The 2024 recipient: Arvind Swamy
- Awarded for: Best performance by an actor in Tamil films
- Country: India
- Presented by: Filmfare
- First award: 2011
- Currently held by: Arvind Swamy for Meiyazhagan (2024)

The Filmfare Critics Award for Best Actor – Tamil is given by Filmfare as part of its annual Filmfare Awards South for Tamil films. The award is given by a chosen jury of critics.

== Winners ==
Year	Actor	Role	Film	Ref.
2011	Vikram	Krishna	Deiva Thirumagal	
2013	Dhanush	Maryan Vijayan Joseph	Maryan	
2014	Karthi	Kaali	Madras	
2015	Jayam Ravi	Mithran	Thani Oruvan	
2016	Suriya	Manikandan / Athreya / Sethuraman	24	
2017	Karthi	Theeran Thirumaran	Theeran Adhigaaram Ondru	
2017	R. Madhavan	Vikram	Vikram Vedha	
2018	Arvind Swamy	Varadharajan "Varadhan" Senapathi	Chekka Chivantha Vaanam	
2019	AWARDS FUNCTION WAS SUSPENDED DUE TO COVID-19 PANDEMIC			
2020–2021	Arvind Swamy	M. J. Ramachandran	Thalaivii	
2020–2021	Arya	Kabilan Munirathnam	Sarpatta Parambarai	
2022	Dhanush	Thiruchitrambalam Jr.	Thiruchithrambalam	
2022	R. Madhavan	Nambi Narayanan	Rocketry: The Nambi Effect	
2023	Siddharth	Eeswaran	Chithha	
2024	Arvind Swamy	Arulmozhi Varman	Meiyazhagan	

== Superlatives ==
Superlative	Recipients	Record
Most wins	Arvind Swamy	3

== See also ==
- Filmfare Critics Award for Best Actress – Tamil
