= Pudhayal =

- Directed by: Selvaa
- Written by: Selvaa; Nagulan Ponnusamy (dialogues)
- Produced by: C. Kabilan
- Starring: Mammootty; Arvind Swamy; Aamani; Sakshi Shivanand
- Cinematography: B. Balamurugan
- Edited by: Venkateswara Rao
- Music by: Vidyasagar
- Production company: Cheran Cine Makers
- Distributed by: K. C. Films; Shogun Films
- Release date: 30 January 1997
- Running time: 144 minutes
- Country: India
- Language: Tamil

Pudhayal (transl. Treasure) is a 1997 Indian Tamil-language heist adventure film directed by Selvaa. The film stars Mammootty, Arvind Swamy and Sakshi Shivanand. The score and soundtrack were composed by Vidyasagar. It was released on 30 January 1997, and was a box office success.

== Cast ==
- Mammootty as Captain Viswanath
- Arvind Swamy as Kodiesvaran
- Sakshi Shivanand as Shobana
- Aamani as Sundari
- Roopa Sri as Anjali
- Goundamani
- Senthil
- Manivannan as Tiruchitrambalam
- Uday Prakash as Madhu
- Alphonsa
- Madhusudhan Rao

== Production ==
Arvind Swami said he accepted the film because he felt he suited the role offered to him. He said, "Since the character was a sort of an idiot, I had to play it accordingly... right down to my garish costumes".

== Soundtrack ==
Soundtrack was composed by Vidyasagar. Lyrics were written by Vairamuthu. The song "Baba Baba" is based on "Bohemian Ballet" by the French group Deep Forest.

Track listing
No.	Title	Singer(s)	Length
1.	"Ochamma Ochamma"	S. P. Balasubrahmanyam,Padma, Unni Menon
2.	"Poothirukkum Vaname"	Hariharan, Uma Ramanan
3.	"Enakkum Unakkum"	Gopal Rao, Swarnalatha
4.	"Dheem Thakka"	Mano, S. Janaki
5.	"Baba Baba"	Gopal Rao, Vidyasagar
