= Marumagal =

- Poster
- Directed by: Karthik Raghunath
- Written by: Aaroor Dass (dialogues)
- Story by: Madhusudan Kalelkar
- Produced by: Anandavalli Balaji
- Starring: Sivaji Ganesan; Suresh; Revathi; Jaishankar
- Cinematography: Suresh Menon
- Edited by: D. Vasu
- Music by: Chandrabose
- Production company: Sujatha Cine Arts
- Release date: 26 January 1986
- Country: India
- Language: Tamil

Marumagal (transl. Daughter-in-law) is a 1986 Indian Tamil-language film, directed by Karthik Raghunath and produced by Anandavalli Balaji. The film stars Sivaji Ganesan, Suresh, Revathi and Jaishankar. It is a remake of the Hindi film Dulhan Wahi Jo Piya Man Bhaye. The film was released on 26 January 1986.

== Plot ==
Wealthy Chandrasekhar (Sivaji Ganesan) wants to see his only heir, grandson Raja (Suresh) marry a home-loving girl. When he falls seriously ill, his personal doctor (Jaishankar) prevails upon Raja to bring his girl friend home and seek his grandfather's blessings. Since Geetha (Pavithra) is out of town, Raja seeks the help of his friend (Y. G. Mahendra) to find a suitable girl to play the role until the grandfather gets well. They approach Radha (Revathi), an innocent flower girl, and convince her to pose as Raja's fiancée. Radha wins over the grandfather and the entire family with her simple charm. Things however get complicated with the arrival of Geetha and her mother (Y. Vijaya) who turns out to be superficial and only interested in the family fortune. While Radha understands the gravity of the situation, she cannot reveal the truth and risk putting Chandrasekhar's life in danger.

== Cast ==
- Sivaji Ganesan as Chandrasekhar, an industrialist
- Suresh as Raja, Chandrasekhar's grandson
- Revathi Menon as Radha
- Jai Shankar as Dr. Shankar
- Y. Vijaya as Malini, Geetha's mother
- Y. G. Mahendra as Jagadish, Raja's friend
- Manorama
- Pavithra as Geetha
- Kallapetti Singaram
- Ennathe Kannaiah

== Soundtrack ==
All music is composed by Chandrabose

Track listing
No.	Title	Lyrics	Singer(s)	Length
1.	"Annaiyaga Maarava Allivaithu"	Pulamaipithan	S. Janaki	03:39
2.	"Nilavae Unnai Azhaithen"	Pulamaipithan	Vani Jairam	03:36
3.	"Rajavae Unthan Rajiyathil"	Vaali	S. P. Balasubrahmanyam S. P. Sailaja and Vani Jairam	04:41
4.	"Om Ganapathiye Ganapathiye"	Vaali	Vani Jairam and chorus	04:46
5.	"Maina Oru Maina Partha"	Vaali	S. P. Balasubramanium and S. Janaki	04:11
Total length:				20:53

== Reception ==
Jayamanmadhan of Kalki cited more than the story, the performances of Ganesan, Revathi and Jaishankar hold the film but felt the director who moved the story without lagging made the climax weak.
