= Ann Sheetal =

Indian model and film actress

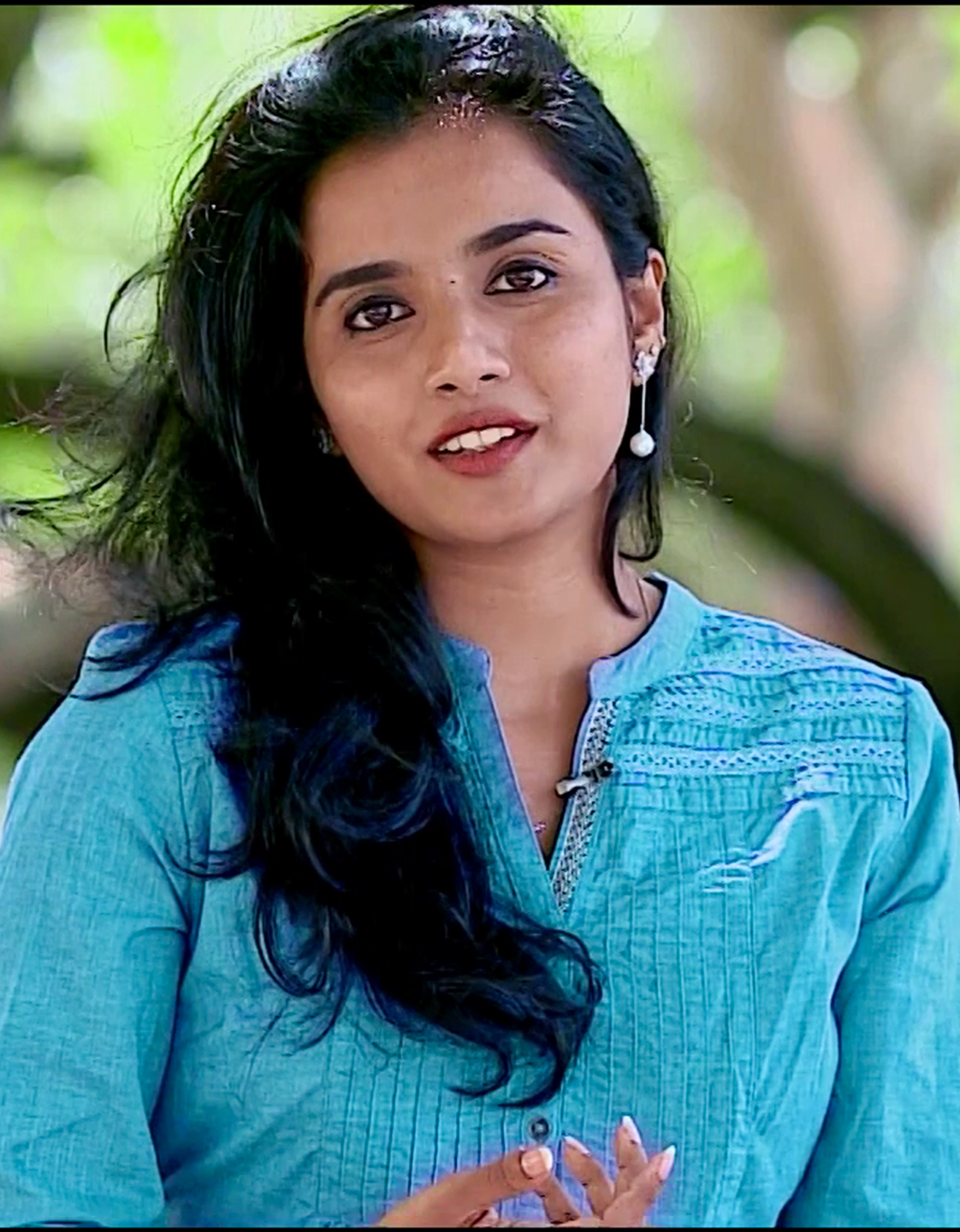
- Born: Ann Sheetal; Kochi, Kerala, India
- Occupations: Actress; model
- Years active: 2017–present

Ann Sheetal is an Indian model and actress, who works in the Malayalam and Tamil film industries.

== Career ==
She made her debut as Rosy in Prithviraj's Malayalam film Ezra. She played the lead role as the heroine in a Malayalam love based film Ishq in 2019. She also acted in Tamil action crime-thriller film Kaalidas written and directed by Sri Senthil.

== Filmography ==
Key
†	Denotes films that have not yet been released

Year	Title	Role	Language	Notes	Ref.
2012	Jawan of Vellimala	Jenny's friend	Malayalam	Debut film	
2017	Ezra	Rosy	Malayalam		
2019	Ishq	Vasudha	Malayalam		
2019	Kaalidas	Vidyaa Kaalidas	Tamil	Debut in Tamil cinema	
2022	Kinnerasani	Vedha	Telugu	Debut in Telugu cinema	
2022	Padachone Ingalu Kaatholi	Renuka	Malayalam		
2024	Singapore Saloon	Nilarathi	Tamil		
2026	Navoria'		Tamil		

=== Music videos ===
Year	Film	Director	Language	Ref.
2015	Celebrate Happiness	—N/a	English	
2017	Aalayal Thara Venam	Sumesh Lal (Kappa TV x Masala Coffee)	Malayalam	https://m.youtube.com/watch?v=JZzgOPaLuGw&list=RDJZzgOPaLuGw&start_radio=1&pp=ygUTYWFsYXlhbCB0aGFyYSB2ZW5hbaAHAQ%3D%3D&ra=m
2019	Tehqeek	Shruthi Namboodiri	Malayalam	
2022	Kaaka Kadha (Mairaandi)	Pradeep Deva kumar	Tamil	Song by Vaisagh
