= Arvind Swamy =

Indian actor, film director, entrepreneur (born 1970)

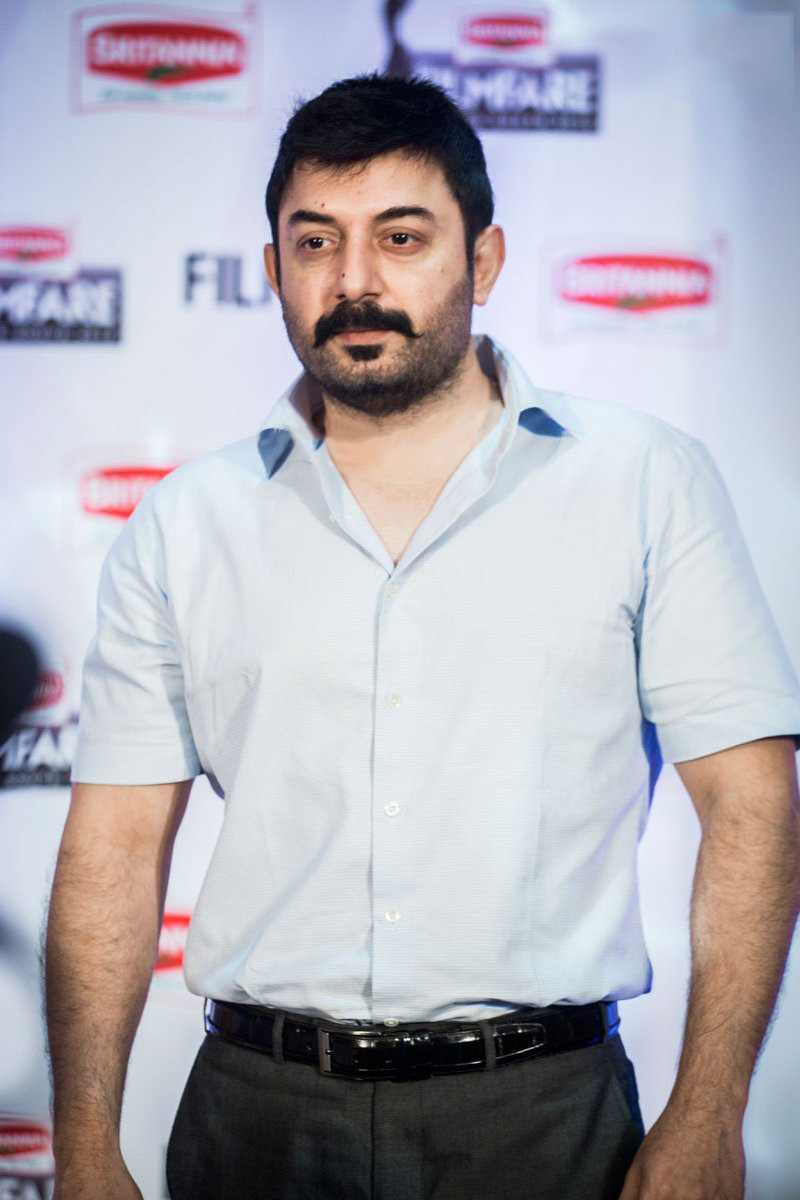
- Swamy at the 63rd Filmfare Awards South in 2016
- Born: 18 June 1970 (age 56); Kumbakonam, Tamil Nadu, India
- Education: Loyola College, Chennai (BCom); Wake Forest University (MA)
- Occupations: Actor; film director; entrepreneur
- Years active: 1991–2000; 2013–present
- Spouses: Gayathri Ramamurthy (m. 1994; div. 2010) Aparna Mukherjee (m. 2012)
- Children: 2
- Father: V. D. Swami; Delhi Kumar (biological father)

Arvind Swamy (born 18 June 1970) is an Indian actor, film director and entrepreneur known for his work in Tamil cinema and a few Hindi, Telugu and Malayalam films. He was introduced by Mani Ratnam with Thalapathi (1991) and subsequently starred in Roja (1992), Paasamalargal (1994), Bombay (1995), Minsara Kanavu (1997), Thani Oruvan (2015), Chekka Chivantha Vaanam (2018), Thalaivi (2023) and Meiyazhagan (2024). He made his debut as a director in the Netflix anthology series Navarasa (2021).

Swamy also starred in other regional film industries, including Telugu and Malayalam films where he has done films such as Mounam (1995), Daddy (1992) and Devaraagam (1996). He has also appeared in Hindi, making his debut appearance as lead actor in Saat Rang Ke Sapne (1998). He briefly worked as a television presenter as the host of the third season of Neengalum Vellalam Oru Kodi (2012–2016) on Star Vijay.

== Early life ==
Aravind Swamy was born in Kumbakonam to a Tamil speaking Iyer father Delhi Kumar. However, he was adopted by his biological mother's sister and husband: industrialist V. D. Swami and Bharatanatyam dancer Vasantha Swamy. Swamy studied at the Sishya School and later in Don Bosco Matriculation Higher Secondary School and completed his schooling in 1987. He then graduated from Loyola College, Madras in 1990 with a Bachelor of Commerce degree. He then went to the United States to do his master's degree in international business from Wake Forest University in North Carolina.

Arvind Swamy wished to be a doctor. In college, he used to be a model for pocket money. In his Loyola Theatre Society, he wasn't well received and was asked to get off stage. Later on Mani Ratnam saw him in an advertisement and called for a meeting. Then Santosh Sivan introduced him to the basics of film-making.

== Career ==
=== 1991–1996: Early career and breakthrough ===
Swamy made his debut in Mani Ratnam's action drama film, Thalapathi (1991), where he played a young district collector pitted against a don and his own biological brother. Subsequently, Mani Ratnam signed him on to play the lead role in his 1992 political drama film Roja (1992). Roja and Bombay (1995) won awards at the State and National Film Awards. His performance in Bombay was called "soulful" by Time Magazine. Swamy has won several awards, popular and critical, for his films. He has been described as one of the first few actors in India who is able to achieve pan-Indian appeal. He lent his voice for the Tamil dubbed version of the adult Simba in Disney's The Lion King (1994). His next project was Indira (1995), followed by the Telugu film Mounam (1995) and Malayalam movie Devaraagam (1996).

=== 1997–2000: Career challenges and sabbatical ===
He starred in Rajiv Menon's Minsaara Kanavu alongside Prabhu Deva and Kajol, which won four National Film Awards besides high box office reviews. During the making of the film, Arvind Swami was critical of Menon changing the script to prioritise Prabhu Deva's role. The film eventually performed well at the box office after a slow start, with Arvind Swami eventually stating he was happy to be a part of the film. His next film, Pudhayal (1997), again saw him portray a role with a cast headlined by another actor, Mammootty (with whom he acted in his debut film Thalapathi). In the film, Arvind wore uncharacteristically loud clothes and portrayed a comedy-oriented role for the first time in his career. Working on the two films meant that he missed out on the opportunity of acting in Mani Ratnam's Iruvar (1997). He appeared in his first Hindi film through Priyadarshan's Saat Rang Ke Sapne (1998) produced by Amitabh Bachchan. Co-starring Juhi Chawla, Arvind portrayed the role of a village do-gooder.

His final two releases before his sabbatical, En Swasa Kaatre (1999) and Raja Ko Rani Se Pyar Ho Gaya (2000) took several years to complete, with long delays during the production phase.

Swamy eventually stopped acting in films post-2000, after playing a guest role in Mani Ratnam's Alai Payuthey, and opted to concentrate on his business interests. As the director of V D Swamy and Company, he continued to engage in international trade and construction businesses. In 2000, he became the president of InterPro Global, and the chairman and managing director of Prolease India, engaged in transaction processing. He was in charge of operations and technology for the delivery of many processes across different verticals globally. He then founded Talent Maximus in 2005, a company engaged in payroll processing and temporary staffing in India. In 2005, he had an accident and injured his spine. He experienced partial paralysis of his leg and suffered in pain for many years. The treatment took another 4–5 years.

=== 2013–present: Back to films ===
After his successful treatment, Mani Ratnam called him once more to play a role in one of his films, Kadal (2013) for which Swamy dropped 15 kilograms. In 2013, he provided the voice-over for Santhosh Sivan's film Ceylon.

In 2015, he played the iconic negative role of Sidharth Abhimanyu in Thani Oruvan, for which he was highly praised and received positive reviews and many awards.

In 2016, he reprised the same role in Telugu in the film Dhruva with Ram Charan, a remake of Thani Oruvan, for which he got appreciation from the Telugu audience. Later that year, he appeared in a Hindi film, Dear Dad. The game show Neengalum Vellalam Oru Kodi recruited Swamy for its third season, which started airing on 30 May 2016.

In 2017, he played the title role of Bogan, co-starring Jayam Ravi, for which he again got an outstanding response from critics and audience.

In 2018, he acted in Bhaskar Oru Rascal, playing the character Mammootty did in the original. The film was followed by Chekka Chivantha Vaanam (2018). The film was released to positive reviews which also got him the Filmfare Award.

In 2021, he acted in A. L. Vijay's directorial biographical-political drama Thalaivii opposite Kangana Ranaut. He portrayed the character of actor-politician M. G. Ramachandran in the film. He returned to Malayalam cinema after 25 years with Ottu (2022). Arvind Swamy stays true to the character and delivers a natural performance. In 2023, he was seen in the bilingual film Custody. In 2024, the Tamil drama film, Meiyazhagan, where he co -starring with Karthi has opened to positive reviews. He plays the role of Major Srinivasan in Anupam Kher’s upcoming directorial Tanvi the Great (2025).

=== Unreleased and shelved films ===
In the late 1990s, several of Arvind Swami's films ran into production troubles. Three of his Tamil films, Gandhi Krishna's Engineer, Azhagam Perumal's Mudhal Mudhalaaga and Mahendran's Sasanam, were all stalled after completing a few production schedules. The former two, which featured him opposite Hindi actresses Madhuri Dixit and Karisma Kapoor, respectively, eventually did not have a theatrical release. Sasanam, which he worked on without remuneration, had a delayed release in 2006. Two prominent Hindi films that he signed during the period, Mahesh Bhatt's venture with Aishwarya Rai, and Anupam Kher's directorial debut film co-starring Amitabh Bachchan, also eventually were dropped.

In the late 2010s, several of Arvind Swamy's films were delayed or shelved as a result of production troubles and the actor's insistence to have his salary settled. Production on Sathuranga Vettai 2 began in July 2016, but remains unreleased following a payment dispute with the film's producer Manobala. Vanangamudi was conceptualised by director Selva in 2014, with the shoot taking place in a slow manner over the course of nine years. Likewise, Engineer, Naragasooran, The Leader, and Kallapart began their shoot in mid-2017 through mid-2023, but these films never had a theatrical release. Other projects such as the Hindi-Tamil bilingual remake of Marathi film Kaksparsh and Santhosh Jayakumar's Pulanaivu were shelved despite entering production.

== Personal life ==
Swamy married Gayathri Ramamurthy in June 1994 and has one daughter Adhira, born in 1996, and a son Rudra, born in 2000. The couple lived separately for seven years until 2010, when they filed for divorce. He was granted the custody of his children. He married Aparna Mukerjee in 2012.

== Filmography ==
=== As an actor ===
==== Films ====
Key
†	Denotes films that have not yet been released

List of films and roles
Year	Film	Role	Language	Notes
1991	Thalapathi	Arjun	Tamil	Credited as Arvind
1992	Roja	Rishi Kumar	Tamil	Nominated–Filmfare Award for Best Actor – Tamil
1992	Daddy	Anand	Malayalam	
1993	Marupadiyum	Gowri Shankar	Tamil	Credited as Arvind
1993	Thalattu	Kuzhanthai	Tamil	Credited as Arvind
1994	Paasamalargal	Raj	Tamil	
1994	Duet	Himself	Tamil	Guest appearance
1995	Bombay	Shekhar Narayanan Pillai	Tamil	Nominated–Filmfare Award for Best Actor – Tamil
1995	Indira	Thiyagu	Tamil	
1995	Mounam	Kiran	Telugu	Also producer
1996	Devaraagam	Vishnu	Malayalam	
1997	Minsara Kanavu	Thomas Thangadurai	Tamil	
1997	Pudhayal	Kodiesvaran	Tamil	
1998	Saat Rang Ke Sapne	Mahipal Sharma	Hindi	
1999	En Swasa Kaatre	Arun Raj	Tamil	
2000	Alai Payuthey	Ram	Tamil	Guest appearance
2000	Raja Ko Rani Se Pyar Ho Gaya	Mohit Kumar	Hindi	Delayed release
2006	Sasanam	Muthiah	Tamil	Delayed release
2013	Kadal	Sam Fernando	Tamil	
2015	Thani Oruvan	Dr. Siddharth Abhimanyu/ Pazhani Sengalvarayan	Tamil	Tamil Nadu State Film Award for Best Villain; Filmfare Award for Best Supporting Actor – Tamil; Ananda Vikatan Cinema Award for Best Villain — Male; IIFA Utsavam Award for Best Performance in Negative Role
2016	Dear Dad	Nitin Swaminathan	Hindi	
2016	Dhruva	Dr. Siddharth Abhimanyu/ Venkanna Chengalarayudu	Telugu	Nominated–SIIMA Award for Best Actor in a Negative Role – Telugu; Nominated–Filmfare Award for Best Supporting Actor – Telugu
2017	Bogan	Aadhitya Maravarman (Bogan)	Tamil	
2018	Bhaskar Oru Rascal	Bhaskar	Tamil	
2018	Chekka Chivantha Vaanam	Varadarajan (Varadan) Senapathi	Tamil	Filmfare Critics Award for Best Actor – Tamil; Nominated–Filmfare Award for Best Actor – Tamil
2021	Thalaivii	M. G. Ramachandran	Tamil; Hindi	Filmfare Critics Award for Best Actor – Tamil; SIIMA Award For Best Actor in a Supporting Role – Tamil
2022	Ottu	David	Malayalam	
2022	Rendangam	David	Tamil	
2023	Custody	Rajashekhar (Raazu)	Tamil; Telugu	
2024	Singapore Saloon	Himself	Tamil	Cameo appearance
2024	Meiyazhagan	Arunmozhi Varman "Arul"	Tamil	Filmfare Critics Award for Best Actor – Tamil; Nominated–Filmfare Award for Best Actor – Tamil
2025	Tanvi The Great	Major Srinivasan	Hindi	
2026	Gandhi Talks	Mohan Boseman	Silent	
2027	SVC63 †	TBA	Hindi	Filming

==== Web series ====
Key
†	Denotes television productions that have not yet been released

List of web series and roles
Year	Title	Role(s)	Language	Network	Notes	Ref.
2021	Navarasa	Vishnu	Tamil	Netflix	1 episode as actor, 1 episode as director	
2024	IC 814: The Kandahar Hijack	DRS	Hindi	Netflix		

==== Television ====
List of television shows and roles
Year	Title	Role(s)	Channel	Notes	Ref.
2016	Neengalum Vellalam Oru Kodi	Host	Star Vijay		

=== As narrator ===
List of films and roles
Year	Film	Notes
2013	Ceylon / Inam	Bilingual film
2016	Uriyadi	
2024	Kanguva	
2025	Wild Tamilnadu	

=== As dubbing artist ===
List of dubbing credits
Title	Actor	Character	Dub language	Original language	Original year release	Dub year release	Notes
Pudhiya Mugam	Suresh Chandra Menon	Major Shiva/Raja	Tamil	Tamil	1993	1993	
The Lion King	Matthew Broderick (voice)	Simba	Tamil	English	1994	1994	
Dil Se..	Shah Rukh Khan	Amarkant Varma (Amar)	Tamil	Hindi	1998	1998	Dubbed Tamil film title: Uyire...
The Lion King	Chiwetel Ejiofor (voice)	Scar	Tamil	English	2019	2019	
Sye Raa Narasimha Reddy	Chiranjeevi	Uyyalawada Narasimha Reddy	Tamil	Telugu	2019	2019	

=== As playback singer ===
- "Udal Manukku" - Iruvar
- "Unnodu Naan Irundha" - Iruvar
- "Kooduvittu Koodu" - Bogan

== Awards ==
Year	Award	Category	Film	Result	Ref.
1992	Filmfare Awards	Filmfare Award for Best Actor – Tamil	Roja	Nominated	
1995	Filmfare Awards	Filmfare Award for Best Actor – Tamil	Bombay	Nominated	
1995	Cinema Express Awards	Best Actor (Special Award)	Bombay	Won	
2015	Filmfare Awards	Filmfare Award for Best Actor – Tamil	Chekka Chivantha Vaanam	Nominated	
2021	Filmfare Awards	Filmfare Award for Best Actor – Tamil	Thalaivi	Nominated	
2024	Filmfare Awards	Filmfare Award for Best Actor – Tamil	Meiyazhagan	Nominated	
2018	Filmfare Awards	Filmfare Critics Award for Best Actor – Tamil	Chekka Chivantha Vaanam	Won	
2021	Filmfare Awards	Filmfare Critics Award for Best Actor – Tamil	Thalaivi	Won	
2024	Filmfare Awards	Filmfare Critics Award for Best Actor – Tamil	Meiyazhagan	Won	
2015	Filmfare Awards	Filmfare Award for Best Supporting Actor – Tamil	Thani Oruvan	Won	
2016	IIFA Utsavam	IIFA Utsavam - Performance in a Negative Role	Thani Oruvan	Won	
2017	IIFA Utsavam	IIFA Utsavam - Performance in a Negative Role	Dhruva	Nominated	
2017	SIIMA Award	Best Actor in a Negative Role	Dhruva	Nominated	
2022	SIIMA Award	Best Actor in a Supporting Role	Thalaivii	Won	
2015	Tamil Nadu State Film Awards	Tamil Nadu State Film Award for Best Villain	Thani Oruvan	Won	
2015	Vikatan Award	Vikatan Award for Best villain – Male	Thani Oruvan	Won	

=== Honours ===
- 1994: Received title of Kalaimamani Award by the Government of Tamil Nadu, which is the highest state honour in the field of Arts
