= Samara (2023 film) =

- Theatrical release poster
- Directed by: Charles Joseph
- Written by: Charles Joseph
- Produced by: M. K. Subhakaran; Anuj Varghese Villyadath
- Starring: Rahman; Bharath; Binoj Villya
- Cinematography: Sinu Sidharth
- Edited by: R. J. Pappan
- Music by: Deepak Warrier (songs); Gopi Sundar (score)
- Production company: Peacock Art House
- Distributed by: Listin Stephen
- Release date: 11 August 2023
- Country: India
- Language: Malayalam

Samara is a 2023 Indian Malayalam-language science fiction thriller film written and directed by Charles Joseph in his directorial debut. The film stars Rahman, Bharath, Sanjana Dipu, Binoj Villya and Rahul Madhav in the lead roles.

The film was released on 11 August 2023 by Listin Stephen.

== Plot ==
The film is about a possible biowar that happens in the country with people getting infected with a virus.

== Cast ==
- Rahman as Antony
- Bharath as Dr. Zakir Rasa Khan
- Binoj Villya as Dr. Alan Moses
- Sanjana Dipu as Jani
- Rahul Madhav as Dr. Azad
- Vivia Santh
- Govind Krishna as Senthil IPS
- Mir Sarwar as Ramanujam
- Dinesh Lamba
- Tinij Villya as Inspector Abhay
- Veer Aryan as Milan
- Neetu Chaudhary
- Sonali Sudan as Geetha

== Production ==
Principal photography took place in Dharamshala, Kullu, Manali and Jammu and Kashmir.

== Music ==
The film has songs composed by Deepak Warrier, while the original background score is provided by Gopi Sundar.

== Release ==
The film was initially scheduled to release in Kerala on 4 August 2023. It was later postponed and released on 11 August 2023. The dubbed Tamil version was released on 13 October 2023 by K.V. Shabarreesh of 2M cinemas. The film was also released in Malaysia on the same date.

== Reception ==
Gopika Is of The Times of India rated the film 2 1/2 out of 5 and stated that " The location of the film, the snow-capped mountains of Himachal Pradesh does offer the movie an aesthetic appeal." Mathrubhumi critic stated that "One can get a ticket for Samara to watch a subject that Malayalam cinema has never tried on the big screen". Asianet News critic wrote that "Charles Joseph's narration of the first film reflects the skill and maturity shown. Even though it is a film with storylines that may be unpalatable to some, it is the skill and skill of the narration that keeps the audience attached to Samara".
