= Vengeance (2026 film) =

- Theatrical release poster
- Directed by: Rahul Ashok
- Written by: Rahul Ashok
- Produced by: A. P. Ashok Kumar
- Starring: Abarnathi
- Cinematography: M. S. Prabhu
- Edited by: Imran
- Music by: Songs: Karthik Raja; Score: AGR (Arun Raj)
- Production company: AC Productions
- Release date: 13 March 2026
- Running time: 149 minutes
- Country: India
- Language: Tamil

Vengeance is a 2026 Indian Tamil-language political drama film written and directed by Rahul Ashok in his directorial debut. It stars Abarnathi in the lead role with Ilavarasu, John Vijay, J. Livingston, Y. G. Mahendran and Kaali Venkat in prominent roles. The film was theatrically released on 13 March 2026.

== Cast ==
- Abarnathi as Veni
- Ilavarasu as CM Velu
- John Vijay as Madhav
- J. Livingston as Thirupathi
- Y. G. Mahendran
- Kaali Venkat as Veni's foster father
- Saravana Subbiah
- Suresh Chakravarthi
- T. M. Karthik
- Sridhar (special appearance in the song "Thannila Kandam")

== Production ==
Vengeance is the directorial debut of Rahul Ashok and took around five years to write. Abarnathi was announced as the lead actress in January 2025. The film was photographed by M. S. Prabhu and edited by Imran.

== Soundtrack ==
The songs are composed by Karthik Raja.

Track listing
No.	Title	Lyrics	Singer(s)	Length
1.	"Thannila Kandam"	Sukin Thamizhnithi	Diwakar	4:24
Total length:				4:24

== Reception ==
Abhinav Subramanian of The Times of India rated the film two out of five stars and wrote, "Abarnathi is the one reason this doesn't completely fall apart. There's a cold composure she brings to the role that keeps suggesting a richer character than anything the screenplay bothers to put on paper". Theja Shree R of Cinema Express gave the film the same rating and wrote, "Ultimately, despite a strong woman-centric performance, the technical glitches and lack of logic make this a difficult watch". On the contrary, a critic from News Today wrote, "Overall, Vengeance stands out for its bold concept and engaging storytelling. By combining political intrigue with a psychological exploration of fame and ambition, the film offers a refreshing and thought-provoking cinematic experience".
