= Pudhiya Mugam =

1993 film by Suresh Chandra Menon

- Poster
- Directed by: Suresh Chandra Menon
- Written by: Suresh Chandra Menon; K. S. Adhiyaman (dialogues)
- Produced by: Suresh Chandra Menon
- Starring: Revathi; Suresh Chandra Menon; Vineeth
- Cinematography: Muthu Ganesh
- Edited by: R. D. Shekar
- Music by: A. R. Rahman
- Production company: Tele Photo Films
- Release date: 28 May 1993
- Country: India
- Language: Tamil

Pudhiya Mugam (transl. New Face) is a 1993 Indian Tamil-language thriller film directed by Suresh Chandra Menon. It stars Revathi, Menon and Vineeth. The film featured music by A. R. Rahman. This was the debut film of Menon and remained his only film until he acted in Solo (2017), 24 years later.

Pudhiya Mugam is an adaptation of the British television miniseries Twist of Fate, which tells the story of an assassin who undergoes plastic surgery and becomes a member of the army, and a hero for them while revisiting his past. It was released on 28 May 1993. The film was loosely remade in Hindi as Vishwavidhaata (1997).

== Plot ==
While romancing in Sri Lanka, Raja Rajeswaran and his fiancée witness a murder, which results in the fiancée's death. Raja avenges her death by killing the people responsible, becomes an assassin, and is on the run from the police. He undergoes extensive plastic surgery on his face and leaves for Chennai, India, to start a new life with a new face and identity, Shivashankar.

When Shiva reaches Chennai Airport, he foils a terrorist attempt and saves the lives of a group of children. Later, he meets Anjali, falls in love, and marries her. Because of his heroism, Shiva is accepted into the Indian Army and rises in rank through the years.

A few years later, the couple's grown-up son, Hari, resembles Shiva's pre-surgery days. Shiva meets Hari's old terrorist accomplices at the airport by chance on his return from the US. The accomplices identify him and, curious, follow Hari and realize the truth about Shiva and his new life. As they learn that Shiva is now a high-ranking officer with access to the army's secrets, they blackmail him into handing some over to them.

Meanwhile, Hari goes for a vacation to Sri Lanka with his girlfriend. There, he learns about his father's earlier life and hates him. On returning to his homeland, he tries to file a case against him, which is stopped by his family friend ACP Shekar.

Shiva, now a changed man, and realising that his son has discovered his past life, writes a letter to Shekar revealing everything and goes to meet the terrorists alone. However, instead of army secrets, he brings an explosive device, which detonates, killing the terrorists and himself. With only his wife not knowing the truth about a man who changed his ways and repented, the assassin is hailed as a hero who died killing the terrorists. Shekar advises Hari not to inform his mother about his father's past life.

== Cast ==
- Revathi as Anjali
- Suresh Chandra Menon as Major Shivashankar (Shiva) / Raja Rajeswaran
- Vineeth as Raja Rajeswaran (Raja) and Hari
- Ravichandran as Varadharajan
- Radha Ravi as Thyagarajan
- Nassar as ACP Shekar IPS
- Chinni Jayanth as Michael
- Rocky
- K. R. Savithri
- Nirmala as Nancy
- Raghuvaran as a terrorist (guest appearance)
- Kasthuri as Kasthuri, Raja Rajeswaran's fiancée (guest appearance)

== Production ==
The producers released a casting call for a debutant actor to play the male lead. The director Suresh Menon ultimately did so as no actors were willing to do it. This was the first film of cinematographer Muthu Ganesh. Arvind Swamy and Vikram lent their voices for Menon and Vineeth respectively. Filming locations included Sri Lanka and Kodaikanal. Menon described Pudhiya Mugam as the first Indian Tamil film shot in Sri Lanka after the 1983 riots.

== Soundtrack ==
The soundtrack composed by A. R. Rahman had six songs and an instrumental theme (which was only included in the cassettes), with lyrics by Vairamuthu. The songs were later reused in the 1997 Hindi film Vishwavidhaata; Rahman was upset with the producers since they had done so without his permission. The guitarist R. Prasanna started his career with this film with the song "July Maadham"; it also marked the singing debut of Annupamaa. The song "Kannukku Mai Azhagu" is set to the Carnatic raga Harikambhoji.

Track listing
| No. | Title | Singer(s) | Length |
|---|---|---|---|
| 1. | "Netru Illadha Matram" | Sujatha | 5:08 |
| 2. | "Kannukku Mai Azhagu" (female) | P. Susheela | 4:24 |
| 3. | "Kannukku Mai Azhagu" (male) | Unni Menon | 4:24 |
| 4. | "July Matham" | S. P. Balasubrahmanyam, Annupamaa | 4:30 |
| 5. | "Idhudhaan Vazhkai Enbada" | Unni Menon, Sujatha | 3:52 |
| 6. | "Sambo Sambo" | Malgudi Subha, Minmini | 4:03 |
| 7. | "Theme" (Instrumental) | – | 1:49 |
| Total length: | | | 28:10 |

== Release and reception ==
Pudhiya Mugam was released on 28 May 1993. Malini Mannath of The Indian Express wrote, "What could have developed into a fast-paced, edge-of-the-seat thriller fizzles out". R. P. R. of Kalki also gave a mixed review, criticising the story but appreciated Rahman's music and Vairamuthu's lyrics.

== Bibliography ==
- Mathai, Kamini (18 June 2009). A. R. Rahman: The Musical Storm. Penguin Books. ISBN 9788184758238.
