= Guardian (2024 film) =

- Theatrical release poster
- Directed by: Guru Saravanan; Sabari
- Written by: Guru Saravanan
- Produced by: Vijay Chandar
- Starring: Hansika Motwani; Suresh Chandra Menon; Sriman
- Cinematography: K. A. Sakthivel
- Edited by: M. Thiyagarajan
- Music by: Sam C. S.
- Production company: Film Works
- Distributed by: Blockbuster Production
- Release date: 8 March 2024
- Country: India
- Language: Tamil

Guardian is a 2024 Indian Tamil-language horror film directed by Sabari and Guru Saravanan, starring Hansika Motwani, Suresh Chandra Menon and Sriman. The film was released on 8 March 2024.

== Cast ==
- Hansika Motwani as Aparna
- Suresh Chandra Menon as Gowtham
- Sriman as Thyagu
- Baby Krishita as Yaazhini
- Rajendran as Azhagu's brother-in-law
- Pradeep Benetto Rayan as Prabha
- Tigergarden Thangadurai as Azhagu
- Abhishek Vinod
- M. J. Shriram as Dr. Rudhran
- Sanjeev as vijay

== Soundtrack ==
The music was composed by Sam C. S.

Track listing
No.	Title	Lyrics	Singer(s)	Length
1.	"Mayakitta"	Viveka, Sam CS, Umadevi	Srinisha Jayaseelan, Sam CS	3:34
2.	"Unlucky"		Anthony Daasan	3:11
3.	"Thiraikadal"		Saindhavi	4:10
4.	"Guardian - Theme Song"		K. S. Chithra	1:08
Total length:				11:53

== Reception ==
Cinema Express rated the film one star out of five and stated, "Like countless horror films, the ghost in Guardian too is gripped with revenge. Even with a familiar story, the makers could have still made an engaging film with focused storytelling or at least they could have leveraged the thrills of the genre. However, the jumpscares are as bland as the story." The Times of India had a similar assessment, calling it "An insipid film with threadbare antagonists and unintentionally comical scares". Manigandan KR of Times Now rated three out of five and wrote "In all, Guardian is a reasonably good horror thriller that is worth watching once."
