= V. D. Swami =

Indian industrialist and philanthropist (1910-1993)

- Born: Venkatarma Doraiswami; 1910; Melattur, Madras Presidency, British India
- Died: 1993 (aged 82–83); Madras, Tamil Nadu, India
- Occupations: Industrialist; Philanthropist
- Spouse: Vasantha Swami
- Children: Arvind Swamy

V. D. Swami (born Venkatarma Doraiswami; 1910 – 1993) was an Indian industrialist and philanthropist who was one of the founders of the eye hospital Sankara Nethralaya in Chennai. He is the father of Tamil actor Arvind Swamy.

== Career ==
Swami was born in a Tamil Brahmin Iyer family in 1910 in Melattur in Tanjore District. In 1956, Swami founded V. D. Swami and Company in Madras along with M. V. Subramaniam and T. S. Narayanaswami of Sanmar Group. V. D. Swami and Company are pioneers in the steel export business. and one of Asia's major wholesalers and retailers. Swami was also one of the promoters of Kaveri Engineering Company Limited, a capital machinery and process machinery manufacturing company based in Tiruchirappalli.

== Other activities ==
In 1962, Swami attended a Bhagavata Mela performance in his native Melattur. Interested in promoting the art outside Melattur, Swami founded the Melattur Bhagavata Mela Natya Vidhya Sangam in 1964.

Swami was instrumental in persuading medical practitioner S. S. Badrinath to set up the eye hospital Sankara Nethralaya in Madras. He also designed welfare measures for its employees. The Sankara Nethralaya recognised his efforts by dedicating an auditorium in his memory on the occasion of his birth centenary.

== Personal life ==
Swami was the husband of Bharathnatyam dancer Vasantha Swamy and the father of prominent Indian actor Arvind Swami.

He died in Madras, Tamil Nadu in 1993 at the age of 83.
