= Dear Dad (2016 film) =

- Directed by: Tanuj Bhramar
- Written by: Tanuj Bhramar
- Produced by: Ratnakar M. Shaan Vyas
- Starring: Arvind Swamy; Himanshu Sharma; Ekavali Khanna; Aman Uppal; Bhavika Bhasin
- Cinematography: Mukesh Gnanesh
- Edited by: Charu Shree Roy
- Music by: Raghav-Arjun; Ujjwal Kashyap
- Release date: 13 May 2016
- Country: India
- Language: Hindi

Dear Dad is a 2016 drama film written and directed by Tanuj Bhramar. The film narrates the tale of a father-son duo – 14-year-old Shivam (Himanshu Sharma), and his 45-year-old dad Nitin (Arvind Swamy). The film was released on 13 May 2016. This is the third Hindi film that Arvind Swamy has acted in.

== Cast ==
- Arvind Swamy as Nitin Swaminathan
- Himanshu Sharma as Shivam Swaminathan
- Ekavali Khanna as Nupur Swaminathan
- Indu Ramchandani as Nitin's Mom
- Ranjith Thakur as Nitin's Father
- Sonika Chopra as Principal Sonika
- Aman Uppal as Aditya Taneja
- Shivam Pradhan as Baba Kaam Bengali
- Bhavika Bhasin as Vidhi Swaminathan
- Chinmai Chandranshuh as Arun
- Ravneet Kler as Ayush Deewan
- Yugdeep as Shivam's friend
- Abhijeet as Shivam's friend
- Nishant as Shivam's friend
- Kanak as Natasha
- B Akshay as Shubh Sharma
- Aditya Suresh as Young Shivam Swaminathan
- Sidharth Bansal as Young Shivam Swaminathan

== Release ==
The Times of India gave the film a rating of three out of five stars and stated that "Dear Dad deserves a watch simply for the profound point it makes about accepting people for who they are and loving them unconditionally". The Hindustan Times gave the film a rating of three-and-a-half out of five stars and wrote that "Luckily, "Dear Dad" is strong enough to withstand extraneous attacks. It is a strong subject and a potentially powerful film replete with the tenderness and brutality that those whom we love tend to thrust on us when pushed to the wall". The Hindu wrote that "So once the disclosure is over and done with there’s nothing else to keep you hooked, Arvind Swamy’s pleasing presence and earnest effort notwithstanding".
