= Kaalidas =

2019 Tamil film

- Theatrical release poster
- Directed by: Sri Senthil
- Written by: Sri Senthil
- Produced by: V. Bhargavi; M. S. Sivanesan; Mani Dinakaran
- Starring: Bharath; Ann Sheetal
- Cinematography: Suresh Bala
- Edited by: Bhuvan Srinivasan
- Music by: Vishal Chandrashekhar
- Production companies: Leaping Horse Entertainment; Incredible Productions; Dina Studios
- Release date: 13 December 2019
- Running time: 126 minutes
- Country: India
- Language: Tamil

Kaalidas is a 2019 Indian Tamil-language crime thriller film written and directed by Sri Senthil. The film stars Bharath and Ann Sheetal, while Suresh Menon and Aadhav Kannadasan portray other pivotal roles. The music was composed by Vishal Chandrashekhar with cinematography by Suresh Bala and editing by Bhuvan Srinivasan.

The film began production during October 2017 and completed its shoot by early 2018. The film was released on 13 December 2019. A sequel, Kaalidas 2, was released in 2026.

== Plot ==
Inspector Kaalidas investigates a string of apparent suicides involving unhappily married women. Strained by work, he neglects his wife, Vidyaa, who is secretly suffering from schizophrenia following the death of their infant child. To cope, Vidyaa hallucinates a tenant—an idealized version of Kaalidas from his college days—and begins a "relationship" with him.

The investigation reveals that Vidyaa is the killer; she murdered the women she met at a local parlor to "protect" her marriage from their influence. The tenant is revealed to be a figment of her imagination, his face borrowed from a stranger she saw in passing. When Vidyaa feels guilty for "cheating" with this hallucination, her subconscious causes the imaginary tenant to attack her. Realizing his neglect caused her breakdown, Kaalidas quits his job to care for Vidyaa, successfully replacing the hallucination by becoming the attentive man she loves.

== Cast ==
- Bharath as Inspector S. Kaalidas
- Ann Sheetal as Vidyaa Kaalidas (Voice dubbed by Deepa Venkat)
- Suresh Menon as ACP George
- Aadhav Kannadasan as Vidyaa's tenant
- R. T. Jayavel as Singadurai
- Priyadharshini as Vidyaa's friend/psychologist
- Ammu Ramachandran
- Yugendran as Aarav
- Velraj as DCP Velraj
- Tiger Garden Thangadurai

== Production ==
The film was announced in October 2017, with production studios Leaping Horse Entertainment, Incredible Productions and Dina Studios announcing that they will jointly produce the directorial debut of Sri Senthil, who had earlier won the reality talent show Naalaiya Iyakkunar. Titled Kaalidas, the team selected Bharath and Suresh Chandra Menon to portray pivotal roles in the film. Bharath was revealed to be portraying a police officer, with the film set in a span of three days. The film completed its shoot across Chennai and Hyderabad, and was revealed to be in post-production by early 2018. Bharath began dubbing for his portions in April after a month-long industry-wide strike on working on film was called off during April 2018.

== Soundtrack ==
The soundtrack was composed by Vishal Chandrashekhar.

Track listing
No.	Title	Lyrics	Singer(s)	Length
1.	"Mazhai"	Thamarai	Sudha Ragunathan	4:08
2.	"Santiago"	Niranjan Bharathi	Andrea Jeremiah	4:04
3.	"Meraki Nenjam"	Niranjan Bharathi	Sharanya Gopinath	3:46
4.	"Kaakai Siraginile"	Subramania Bharati	Abhay Jodhpurkar	2:46
5.	"Maalai Pozhudhin"	Subramania Bharati	Abhay Jodhpurkar	3:02
Total length:				17:46

== Reception ==
Sify wrote, "Overall, Kaalidas is a smart investigation thriller that conveys an important message to this fast-moving society without being preachy." Srivatsan S of The Hindu wrote, "Kaalidas gets engaging by stitching these individual plots together, even though the proceedings leading up to the final showdown leave you confused — partly because none of these deaths or characters register." Thinkal Menon of The Times of India wrote, "The movie has the required elements of a suspense thriller and the performance of lead artistes, too, elevate the decent script". Haricharan Pudipeddi of Hindustan Times wrote, "With some impressive writing and by avoiding stereotypes, the film stands out." Navein Darshan of The New Indian Express wrote, "The rock-solid story gets diluted because of this convoluted part of the screenplay, and when the ultimate reveal is shown screen, you have either already guessed it or you are not invested enough to relish it."

== Sequel ==
A sequel, Kaalidas 2, was released in 2026. Sri Senthil directed this film too, and Bharath reprised his role as Kaalidas.
