= Chekka Chivantha Vaanam =

2018 film directed by Mani Ratnam

- Theatrical release poster
- Directed by: Mani Ratnam
- Written by: Mani Ratnam; Siva Ananth
- Produced by: Mani Ratnam; A. Subaskaran
- Starring: Arvind Swami; Silambarasan; Arun Vijay; Vijay Sethupathi
- Cinematography: Santosh Sivan
- Edited by: A. Sreekar Prasad
- Music by: Score: A. R. Rahman Qutub-E-Kripa; Songs: A. R. Rahman
- Production companies: Madras Talkies; Lyca Productions
- Distributed by: Lyca Productions
- Release date: 27 September 2018
- Running time: 143 minutes
- Country: India
- Language: Tamil

Chekka Chivantha Vaanam (transl. Crimson Red Sky) is a 2018 Indian Tamil-language crime drama film written and directed by Mani Ratnam and co-written with Siva Ananth. Produced by Ratnam under Madras Talkies, along with A. Subaskaran of Lyca Productions, the film stars Arvind Swamy, Silambarasan, Arun Vijay and Vijay Sethupathi, with Prakash Raj, Jyothika, Aishwarya Rajesh, Aditi Rao Hydari, Dayana Erappa, Jayasudha, Thiagarajan and Mansoor Ali Khan. It follows three brothers who engage in a power struggle for control over their father's criminal empire.

The project began pre-production by July 2017. Principal photography commenced in February 2018 and filming continuously took place in locations including Chennai, Abu Dhabi, Dubai and Serbia until June. The soundtrack and background score were composed by A. R. Rahman, while Santhosh Sivan handled the cinematography and A. Sreekar Prasad edited the film.

Chekka Chivantha Vaanam was released on 27 September 2018 to positive reception from critics and audiences, praising the direction and performances of the cast, but criticising it for lacking strong women characters. Chekka Chivantha Vaanam won two awards at the Ananda Vikatan Cinema Awards, one Tamil Nadu State Film Award (Best Actress for Jyothika) and received seven nominations at the 66th Filmfare Awards South, winning Critics Best Actor – Tamil (Swamy).

== Plot ==
In Chennai, powerful underworld don Senapathi and his wife Lakshmi survive a coordinated ambush by assassins disguised as police officers. News of the attack reaches their pregnant daughter, Priya, and three sons, who converge on the city. The impulsive eldest son, Varadharajan "Varadhan," manages the syndicate's ground operations in Chennai while having an extramarital affair with a journalist, Parvathi. The second son, Thyagarajan "Thyagu," operates a sophisticated hawala network laundering family funds in Dubai. The youngest son, Ethiraj "Ethi," runs an independent weapons-smuggling enterprise based in Serbia. Varadhan pressures his childhood friend, a suspended inspector named Rasool Ibrahim, to hunt down the hitmen, firmly believing that Senapathi's long-term rival, Chinnappadasan, ordered the assassination attempt.

During a tense confrontation, Chinnappadasan denies any involvement, but an unsatisfied Varadhan retaliates by murdering Chinnappadasan's son-in-law. This triggers a multi-pronged retaliatory strike; Thyagu and the family survive a shooting in the family residence, Ethi beats back an armed mob during a football match, and Varadhan's convoy is ambushed. A recovered Senapathi brokers a truce with Chinnappadasan during a family function, but privately confides to Lakshmi that the true mastermind behind the initial hit is one of their sons. Shortly after, Senapathi dies of a stroke. Varadhan immediately seizes the throne, freezes Thyagu's offshore funding, and pulls political strings to have Thyagu's wife Renu jailed on fabricated charges. Concurrently, Ethi's new bride, Chaaya, is assassinated in Serbia.

Driven by a shared desire for vengeance, Thyagu and Ethi forge a tactical alliance to depose Varadhan. Bypassing state borders through Nepal, they return to Chennai, where they systematically dismantle Varadhan's domestic power base by bribing his henchmen with higher wages. They execute Varadhan's maternal uncle and key lieutenant, Chezhiyan, while Ethi abducts Parvathi to use as leverage. Fearing for his children's safety, a cornered Varadhan sends them to Coimbatore with Priya and flees Chennai with his loyalists and his wife, Chitra. Thyagu and Ethi track him to a safehouse in Andhra Pradesh, sparking a violent shootout in which Chitra is mortally wounded. At her deathbed in a local hospital, a guilt-ridden Varadhan confesses to Chitra that he had orchestrated the original hit on Senapathi to secure total corporate control.

With Rasool's tactical assistance, Thyagu and Ethi capture a broken Varadhan in the wilderness. Thyagu promptly executes Varadhan in retribution for Renu's imprisonment. Immediately after, Ethi holds Thyagu at gunpoint, accusing him of orchestrating Chaaya's assassination. Thyagu confesses that he ordered the hit on Chaaya specifically to frame Varadhan and manipulate Ethi into joining the war. An enraged Ethi shoots Thyagu dead.

Left as the sole survivor, Ethi demands that Rasool either pledge his allegiance or die. Stalling for time, Rasool reflects on his childhood trauma—watching his own gangster father get gunned down at Chennai International Airport, which drove his mother to suicide and left him with a lifelong hatred of the criminal underworld. Rasool reveals that he is actually an active undercover police officer tasked with the absolute destruction of Senapathi's empire. He explains that his strategic role in driving a wedge between the brothers was designed to make them annihilate each other. Rasool shoots Ethi dead, subsequently reporting to his superiors that "Operation Red Sky" has been successfully concluded.

== Cast ==
- Silambarasan as Ethiraj “Ethi” Senapathi
- Arvind Swamy as Varadharajan "Varadhan" Senapathi
- Arun Vijay as Thyagarajan “Thyagu” Senapathi
- Vijay Sethupathi as Inspector Rasool Ibrahim
- Prakash Raj as Senapathi
- Jayasudha as Lakshmi Senapathi
- Jyothika as Chitra Varadarajan
- Aishwarya Rajesh as Renuka "Renu" Thyagarajan
- Dayana Erappa as Chaaya
- Aditi Rao Hydari as Parvathi (voice-over by Krithika Nelson)
- Thiagarajan as Chinnappadasan
- Mansoor Ali Khan as Khalid
- Siva Ananth as Chezhiyan
- Appani Sarath as Nambirajan
- RJ Sindhu as Priya
- Santhosh as Sandeep
- Vesta Chen as Nepal Customs Officer
- Gowtham Sundararajan as Assistant Commissioner
- T. M. Karthik as Ranjith
- Sugunthan as Veluthambi
- George Vijay Nelson as Esthappa
- G. Vittal Rao as A. H. Basheer
- Kavitha Bharathy as Aruldas
- Divyasree as Bhuvana
- Kumar Natarajan as Chinnappa and Senapathi's lawyer

== Production ==
=== Development ===
Following a brief break after the release of his directorial project Kaatru Veliyidai (2017), Mani Ratnam chose to begin pre-production on his next film by July 2017 and brought in composer A. R. Rahman and cinematographer Santosh Sivan for the project. Siva Ananth was credited as the co-writer, while Bejoy Nambiar worked as one of the creative producers. Dhilip Subbarayan was signed to choreograph the stunt sequences, while Sharmishta Roy and Eka Lakhani were signed as the production designer and costume designer, respectively. In a 2022 interview with journalist Sudhir Srinivasan, Ratnam revealed that Mughal emperor Aurangzeb's battle for the throne was the inspiration for the film.

=== Casting ===
In July 2017, reports suggested that the film would feature four male characters, and actors Vijay Sethupathi, Arvind Swamy, Fahadh Faasil and Dulquer Salmaan were in negotiations to play various roles. While the first three actors eventually accepted to work on the film, discussions with Dulquer fell through. Silambarasan later signed on in early September 2017, and an official announcement from the production studio confirmed the four lead actors were attached to the project. Nani had also held discussions with Ratnam for a role in the film, but was later not included in the final cast. Prior to the beginning of the shoot, Silambarasan undertook a weight loss regimen to get into shape for his character.

In the months leading up to the start of the shoot, there was speculation in the media that Silambarasan would be banned from the project after allegations were made by producer S. Michael Rayappan about the actor's non co-operation during the making of Anbanavan Asaradhavan Adangadhavan (2017). Despite protests from other film producers, Ratnam chose to retain Silambarasan. In a media interaction during January 2018, Sethupathi confirmed that he would portray a full-length role, denying reports that it was a cameo. Fahadh later opted out due to scheduling conflicts, and was later replaced by Arun Vijay.

Jyothika agreed to portray a leading female role in early September 2017, and confirmed her participation to the media while promoting Magalir Mattum (2017). She had earlier appeared in Ratnam's production venture Dumm Dumm Dumm (2001), but stated her excitement at being selected in a film to be directed by him. Likewise, Aishwarya Rajesh also revealed her presence in the project in early September 2017, and expressed her delight working with Ratnam. In late January 2018, Aditi Rao Hydari, who had starred in Kaatru Veliyidai (2017), was also confirmed to be a part of the cast. Model Dayana Erappa also later joined the cast to play the fourth leading actress, marking her first acting assignment. She was cast after two rounds of auditions and then prepared for her role by attending workshops led by theatre actors in Mumbai.

For a supporting role, actress Jayasudha agreed to work on the film in November 2017, while Prakash Raj joined the cast during the following month to portray her husband. The production house revealed that actors Thiagarajan and Mansoor Ali Khan were also added to the cast before filming started. Furthermore, other supporting actors including Cheenu Mohan and Malayalam actor Antony Varghese were reported to have signed to play characters in the film, though Antony Varghese was later replaced by Appani Sarath.

=== Filming ===
In late January 2018, before the start of the shoot, Lyca Productions reportedly agreed to purchase the rights of the film on a "first copy" basis and release it worldwide. Three days before the start of the shoot in February 2018, the film's title was announced as Chekka Chivantha Vaanam in Tamil, and as Nawab for the dubbed Telugu version. Principal photography began on 12 February 2018 on the outskirts of Chennai, with scenes shot on the East Coast Road and at the Apollo Hospital in Vanagaram during the first schedule.

A second schedule began on 26 February 2018, with all members of the cast intermittently featuring in the shoot. As the second schedule progressed, cinematographer Santosh Sivan released images of the various actors on the sets of the film. The shoot continued in Chennai until mid-March, with a wedding scene, also shot, before being halted as a result of a film industry-wide production strike announced by the Tamil Film Producers Council, who were campaigning against extortionate rates employed by digital service providers.

Following the strike, production resumed in Chennai on 25 April 2018, with scenes involving Sethupathi being shot near Kovalam Beach in Chennai. Media reports emerged suggesting that the production team had carelessly littered areas of the beach during the making of the film, making it dangerous for public use, but executive producer Siva Ananth refuted the allegations. In May 2018, the team travelled to Abu Dhabi and Dubai to shoot scenes involving Arun and Aishwarya, as a part of three week schedule. The final schedule featuring Silambarasan was completed over a week in Serbia and principal photography subsequently wrapped on 2 June 2018. A. Sreekar Prasad edited the film.

== Music ==
A. R. Rahman composed the film's soundtrack. The album was released on 5 September 2018 by Sony Music, and Rahman gave a live performance of the songs.

== Release ==
Chekka Chivantha Vaanam, along with its dubbed Telugu version, was released on 27 September 2018. It was advanced by one day from 28 September. The film's television premiere took place on STAR Vijay on 13 January 2019.

== Reception ==
=== Critical response ===
On the review aggregator website Rotten Tomatoes, 83% of 6 critics' reviews are positive, with an average rating of 6.3/10.

M Suganth of The Times of India gave the film 3.5 out of 5 stars and summarised that "The single-mindedness of the script, which doesn't stray away from its two major concerns is the film’s strength." Nandini Ramnath of Scroll.in called it a subtle yet clever tribute to Akira Kurosawa's Ran. Kirubhakar Purushothaman from India Today rated the film 4 out of 5 stars, summarising that "Throughout, the film pretends to be a hunt for that one bad guy among the heroes. But in the end, you realise how wrong you were." Anupama Subramanian of Deccan Chronicle rated the film 3 out of 5 stars and noted, "CCV is a revenge drama that would leave you captivated and spellbound."

Manoj Kumar R of The Indian Express rated 3 out of 5 stars for the film and summarised that "Chekka Chivantha Vaanam feels like the work of a fresh director with an impressive understanding about the craft of filmmaking. It could be because auteur Mani Ratnam has made a violent film after a very long time. It could also be because it is a straightforward movie, in which he has highly favored words to images." Sreedhar Pillai, writing for Firstpost rated 3.5 out of 5, and commented that "Mani Ratnam's direction triumphs in a story-driven crime thriller". IANS rated the film with 4 out 5 stars, and summarised that "Ratnam's Chekka Chivantha Vaanam, which is undeniably his best work of this decade, is a slow-burning, highly rewarding story of a crime-ridden family that gets torn apart by power, greed and deceit." S. Shivakumar of The Hindu noted the similarities with the 2013 South Korean film New World and called it "the closest Mani Ratnam has come to plagiarism".

=== Box office ===
During the first four days of the film's release, it grossed ₹300 million (US$4 million) gross in Tamil Nadu alone, taking one of the largest openings recorded in the region. The film did well in international markets, including the United States, the United Kingdom, Australia and the New Zealand. Within two days of release, the film had made A$170,682 (US$121,512) in Australia, £63,895 (US$82,690) in the UK, NZ$54,411 (US$35.530) in New Zealand and $592,319 in the US.

== Accolades ==
Award	Category	Recipient(s) and nominee(s)	Result	Ref.
Ananda Vikatan Cinema Awards	Best Stunt Choreographer	Dhilip Subbarayan	Won	
Ananda Vikatan Cinema Awards	Best Costume Designer	Eka Lakhani	Won	
66th Filmfare Awards South	Best Film – Tamil	Chekka Chivantha Vaanam	Nominated	
66th Filmfare Awards South	Best Director – Tamil	Mani Ratnam	Nominated	
66th Filmfare Awards South	Best Actor – Tamil	Arvind Swamy	Nominated	
66th Filmfare Awards South	Critics Best Actor – Tamil	Arvind Swamy	Won	
66th Filmfare Awards South	Best Supporting Actor – Tamil	Arun Vijay	Nominated	
66th Filmfare Awards South	Best Music Director – Tamil	A. R. Rahman	Nominated	
66th Filmfare Awards South	Best Female Playback Singer – Tamil	Shakthisree Gopalan	Nominated	
Tamil Nadu State Film Awards	Best Actress	Jyothika	Won	
