= Paasamalargal =

- Theatrical release poster
- Directed by: Suresh Chandra Menon
- Written by: Suresh Chandra Menon; K. S. Adhiyaman (dialogues)
- Produced by: Suresh Chandra Menon
- Starring: Arvind Swamy; Revathi
- Cinematography: Muthu Ganesh
- Edited by: R. D. Shekhar
- Music by: V. S. Narasimhan
- Production company: Tele Photo Films
- Release date: 4 February 1994
- Country: India
- Language: Tamil

Paasamalargal (transl. Flowers of love) is a 1994 Indian Tamil-language romantic drama film directed by Suresh Chandra Menon. The film stars Arvind Swamy and Revathi. It was released on 4 February 1994.

== Plot ==
Sakthi (Arvind Swamy) is a wealthy businessman who lives a luxurious life but is known for his arrogance and self-centered attitude. He has little interest in social activities, relationships, or helping others and remains focused only on his own comfort and business affairs. He avoids responsibilities beyond his personal life and does not understand the struggles of people around him.

Raj's life begins to change when he comes across the difficulties faced by six orphan girls. Initially, he becomes involved in helping them for reasons connected to his own image and reputation rather than genuine affection. However, as he starts spending time with the girls and learns about their hardships, his attitude gradually changes. He takes responsibility for their education, upbringing, and future, becoming their guardian and strongest source of support.

During this period, Raj meets Asha (Revathi), a compassionate woman who understands his efforts towards the girls. Asha's kindness and concern bring a positive influence into Raj's life. As they work together for the welfare of the girls, Raj and Asha develop a close relationship and eventually fall in love. Among the girls supported by Raj is Vineetha (Vineetha) who is in a relationship with Kumar (Ajith Kumar), leaves the orphanage to live with Kumar.

Raj's life changes when he is diagnosed with cancer. He hides the seriousness of his illness from Asha and the girls because he does not want their happiness to be affected. Despite his declining health, Raj continues to make arrangements for the girls' future and ensures that they will be taken care of after him.

As Raj's condition worsens, Asha and the girls come to know about his illness. They stand by him and realize the sacrifices he has made for them. Raj's illness creates a difficult situation for everyone, as the girls who depended on him must face the possibility of losing the person who protected and supported them. The film ends with Raj's struggle against his illness and the impact of his love and sacrifice on the lives of Asha and the girls.

== Cast ==
- Arvind Swamy as Sakthi
- Revathi as Asha
- M. N. Nambiar as Swamy Uncle
- Srividya as Doctor
- Chinni Jayanth as Jackson
- Deepa Venkat as Jhanvi
- Gayathri Shastry as Gayathri
- Vineetha as Vineetha
- Swathi as Swathi
- Shree Durga as Durga
- Priyanka as Priya
- Raghuvaran in a guest appearance
- Sukumari in a guest appearance
- Ajith Kumar in a guest appearance as Kumar

== Production ==
Ajith Kumar was cast in the film after he had appeared in a television advertisement shot by P. C. Sreeram for Suresh Menon's company. His voice was dubbed by Vikram, who also dubbed his voice in Amaravathi (1993). Ajith's role was roughly one minute long, and his remuneration around ₹2,500 (equivalent to ₹16,000 or US$170 in 2023).

== Soundtrack ==
The music was composed by V. S. Narasimhan, with lyrics by Vairamuthu. It is the last film for which Narasimhan composed music.

Track listing
| No. | Title | Singer(s) | Length |
|---|---|---|---|
| 1. | "Valarum Valarum" | S. P. Balasubrahmanyam, Sujatha and children |
| 2. | "Shenbaga Poovai" | S. P. Balasubrahmanyam, Sujatha and children |
| 3. | "Vandhanam" | Suresh Peters and children |
| 4. | "Vanna Pirindhu" | Children |
| 5. | "Sandhithom Sandhithom" | Children |
| 6. | "Azhagana Veedu" | Sujatha and children |
| 7. | "Vanna Vanna" | Children |

== Release and reception ==
Paasamalargal was released on 4 February 1994. Writing for The Indian Express, Malini Mannath called it "a decent wholesome family entertainer". Thulasi of Kalki found the cinematography and music as the film's positive points.
