= Grandmaster =

Grandmaster or Grand Master may refer to:

== People ==
- Grandmaster Flash, Joseph Saddler (born 1958), hip-hop musician and disc jockey
- Grandmaster Melle Mel, Melvin Glover (born 1961), hip-hop musician
- "Grandmaster Sexay", nickname for professional wrestler Brian Christopher

== Arts, entertainment, and media ==
=== Fictional characters ===
- Grand Master (Jedi), also known as "Jedi Grand Master", or formally "Grand Master of the Jedi Order"—Order of the Jedi in Star Wars
- Grandmaster (DC Comics), a DC Comics character
- Grandmaster (Marvel Comics), a Marvel Comics character
- "Grandmaster B", a nickname used by Bud Bundy from the TV sitcom Married... with Children
- Grand Master of Witches, a fictional character from the anime Tweeny Witches
- The Grand Master, a recurring antagonist in the television series M. I. High

=== Films ===
- Grandmaster (1972 film), a Soviet drama film by Sergey Mikaelyan
- Grandmaster (2012 film), an Indian film by B. Unnikrishnan
- The Grandmaster (film), a 2013 Hong Kong film by Wong Kar-wai
- The Grand Master (2026 film), a 2026 Indian film

=== Music ===
- Grandmasters (album), an album by DJ Muggs and GZA

== Positions ==
- Grand Master (ancient China)
- Grand Master (order), the head of various orders
  - Grand Master of the Knights Hospitaller
  - Grand Master of the Knights Templar
  - Grand Master of the Teutonic Order
- Grand Master of Education, Science, and Culture, Francisco Macías Nguema (1924–1979), the first president of Equatorial Guinea
- Grand Master (Freemasonry), title of honour given to a freemason who oversees a Masonic jurisdiction

== Ranks / titles ==
=== Grand master ===
- Grand Master, a rank in competitive shooting within the USPSA and IPSC
- Grand Master, the highest skill ranking in the Tetris: The Grand Master video game series
- Damon Knight Memorial Grand Master Award, awarded by the Science Fiction and Fantasy Writers of America
- Grand Master of Memory, awarded by the World Memory Sports Council

=== Grandmaster ===
- Grandmaster (chess)
- Grandmaster (martial arts)
- Grandmaster or Master craftsman, a member of a guild
- Grandmaster, the second highest skill ranking in the Overwatch video game
- MWA Grand Master Award, awarded by the Mystery Writers of America
- Spectrum Award for Grand Master awarded by Spectrum Fantastic Art
- World Grand Master (bridge), maintained by the World Bridge Federation
- World Horror Convention Grand Master Award, voted by participants in the annual World Horror Convention

== Other uses ==
- Grand Master (custom car), winner of the 2002 Ridler Award
- Grandmaster, the source for the time reference in Precision Time Protocol

== See also ==
- Grand Wizard
