= Thaen (film) =

2021 Tamil language drama film

- Theatrical release poster
- Directed by: Ganesh Vinayakan
- Written by: Ganesh Vinayakan; Rasi Thangadurai
- Produced by: Ambalavanan B. Prema P.
- Starring: Tharun Kumar; Abarnathi; Aruldoss
- Cinematography: M. Sukumar
- Edited by: Lawrence Kishore
- Music by: Sanath Bharadwaj
- Production company: AP Productions
- Release date: 19 March 2021
- Country: India
- Language: Tamil

Thaen (transl. Honey) is a 2021 Indian Tamil-language drama film co-written and directed by Ganesh Vinayakan. Tharun and Abarnathi feature in the lead roles, while Aruldoss and Bava Lakshmanan among others play supporting roles.

The film narrates the tale of an uneducated young rural beekeeper facing seemingly unsurmountable challenges when his wife is diagnosed with a rare disease. The film was released on 19 March 2021 and received critical acclaim for its direction, theme and realistic performances by the lead actors .

== Cast ==
- Tharun as Velu
- Abarnathi as Poongodi
- Aruldoss
- Bava Lakshmanan
- Kayal Devaraj
- Anusri

== Production ==
Alongside Asuran (2019), the film was the only other Tamil film screened at the Indian Panorama 2020 event in Goa. In 2021 it was also shown at the Pune International Film Festival and the Cinequest Film And Creativity Festival.

== Soundtrack ==
Soundtrack was composed by Sanath Bharathwaj.

- Usuraye Ulukkudhe - Saindhavi
- Alli Poo - Haricharan

== Release ==
The film opened on 19 March 2021 across Tamil Nadu. A reviewer from Times of India wrote "the hard-hitting dialogues about the government identifying its citizens are engaging enough in the film which has an overdose of melodrama."

A reviewer from The New Indian Express noted "Despite having able lead actors, because of issues with the direction, there is a disconnect between the audience and the film". The critic added "Though Ganesh Vinayakan's Thaen aims to weave a hard-hitting backstory inspired by this tragic event, all the impact it leaves us with is that of a passing news scroll". A reviewer from Film Companion noted "at the center of Thaen is the question of nature versus civilization. It makes a forceful argument for the preservation of our hills, but it's missing nuance and depth." Sify.com called the film a "hard-hitting emotional drama". This movie is now streaming on SonyLiv.

== Awards ==
- 2020 Cult Critic Movie Awards
- 2020 Tamil Nadu State Film Award Special Prize Best Film

- 2020 Tamil Nadu State Film Award Special Prize Best Actor - Tharun
- 2020 Tamil Nadu State Film Award Special Prize Best Actress - Abarnathi
