= Suresh Chandra Menon =

Indian film director and actor

- Born: 24 October 1957 (age 68); Ponnani, Malappuram, Kerala, India
- Occupations: Actor; Film director; Cinematographer
- Years active: 1986 – 1993; 2017 – present
- Spouse: Revathi (m. 1986; div. 2013)

Suresh Chandra Menon is an Indian actor, cinematographer and film director who works predominantly in Tamil films.

== Personal life ==
After meeting Revathi during a film shoot of Marumagal (1986), they fell in love and married in 1986 with the blessings of their parents. They did not have any children. Though they looked like an ideal couple, differences arose between the two and they decided to amicably separate in 2002. Revathi and Suresh Menon then filed separate petitions, seeking mutual split, before the court. On 22 April 2013 a family court in Chennai granted them mutual divorce considering the fact that they had been living separately for the past 10 years. Revathi said in an interview that they would remain good friends even after the divorce.

== Career ==
Menon is known for directing many documentaries and advertisements. Having started his career as cinematographer for the films produced by Sujatha Cine Arts, he directed, produced and played the lead role in the Tamil film Pudhiya Mugam which was released in 1993. His then wife Revathi was the lead heroine in the film. It was both a critical and commercial success. He went on to direct another film Paasamalargal (1994) which was released in 1994. This film also featured Revathi in the lead along with Arvind Swami.

After nearly two decades, Menon made his acting comeback with Solo (2017). He was seen as a CBI officer in Thaanaa Serndha Koottam (2018). He was later co-starred with Vijay Sethupathi in Junga (2018), Annabelle Sethupathi (2021) as well as with Prabhu Deva in Pon Manickavel (2021) and My Dear Bootham (2022). He started in horror films such as Ghosty (2023), Chandramukhi 2 (2023) and Guardian (2024).

== Filmography ==
=== As actor ===
Tamil films

Year	Film	Role	Notes
1993	Pudhiya Mugam	Major Shiva	Also director
2017	Solo	Brig. Sundharajan	
2018	Thaanaa Serndha Koottam	Uthaman	
2018	Junga	Kumarasamy Chettiyaar	
2019	Kaalidas	George	
2021	Annabelle Sethupathi	Kadhiresan's Grandson	
2021	Pon Manickavel	Arjun K. Maran	
2022	Koogle Kuttappa	Humanoid Dynamics CEO	
2022	Achcham Madam Naanam Payirppu	Baradwaj	
2022	My Dear Bootham	Doctor	
2022	Cobra	Nawab	
2022	Captain	S. Rajiv Chakravarthy	
2023	Ghosty	Police Inspector	
2023	Thudikkum Karangal	Devaraj	
2023	Chandramukhi 2	Ranganayaki's brother	
2023	Sooragan	Devaraj	
2024	Singapore Saloon	Anoop Menon's customer	
2024	Guardian	Gowtham	
2024	Haraa	Neeram	
2024	The Smile Man	Venkatesh	
2025	Niram Marum Ulagil	Lal Bhai	
2025	Red Flower		
2026	Kaalidas 2	ACP George	
2026	The Grand Master		

Other language films

Year	Film	Role	Language	Notes
2017	Solo	Brig.Sundharajan	Malayalam	
2019	Lucifer	Abdul	Malayalam	
2019	Akhanda	Businessman	Telugu	
2024	Zebra	Military	Telugu	

=== As director and producer ===
Year	Film	Director	Producer	Notes
1993	Pudhiya Mugam	Yes	Yes	
1994	Paasamalargal	Yes	Yes	
2002	Mitr, My Friend	No	Yes	English film

=== Cinematographer ===
- Marumagal (1986)
- Viduthalai (1986)

=== Television ===
Year	Title	Role	Channel	Notes
1995	Doctors	Doctor Ravi	Sun TV	also director
1995	Chinna Chinna Aasai	Chinna	Sun TV	acted in stories "Vanna Vanna Pookkal", "Bandham"
1999	Nizhalgal	Priyan	Sun TV	also producer and director
2021	Raja Mannar Vagaiyara	Veerasekara Rajamannar	Polimer TV	
2022	Meera	Dr. Krishna	Colors Tamil	Replaced by Suresh
