= Kaadhal =

- Poster
- Directed by: Balaji Sakthivel
- Written by: Balaji Sakthivel
- Produced by: S Shankar
- Starring: Bharath; Sandhya; Sukumar
- Cinematography: Vijay Milton
- Edited by: G. Sasikumar
- Music by: Joshua Sridhar
- Distributed by: S Pictures
- Release date: 17 December 2004
- Running time: 150 minutes
- Country: India
- Language: Tamil

Kaadhal (transl. Love) is a 2004 Indian Tamil-language romantic drama film based on a true story, directed by Balaji Sakthivel, starring Bharath and Sandhya. It was produced by S. Shankar and featured music composed by Joshua Sridhar. The film opened on 17 December 2004 to positive reviews and was a commercial success. The film was dubbed into Telugu as Premisthe in 2005. It was remade in Kannada as Cheluvina Chittara in 2007, in Bengali as Chirodini Tumi Je Amar in 2008, in Bangladesh as Nogor Mastan in 2015, in Marathi as Ved Laavi Jeeva in 2010, in Nepali as Manjari in 2013 and in Punjabi as Ramta Jogi in 2015.

== Plot ==
Murugan is a diligent scooter mechanic in Madurai, leading a simple and peaceful life—until Aishwarya, a wealthy student and the daughter of a local goon and bar owner, takes an interest in him. Her infatuation turns dangerous when she persuades Murugan to help her escape the constraints imposed by her family, who have other plans for her future. At first, Murugan hesitates to pursue a relationship, worried about the differences in their social status and caste. But he eventually recognizes her genuine love and reciprocates her feelings. Aware that Aishwarya's family will never approve of their marriage, the couple decides to elope to Chennai. With the help of Murugan's friend Stephen during this critical time, they manage to marry. However, Aishwarya's family, who dotes on her, is far from willing to let them go easily.

The family tracks down the couple and reaches Chennai to confront them. However, they pretend to accept the wedding and persuade Murugan and Aishwarya to return to Madurai with them. On the way back, the family takes the couple to their farmland, where Aishwarya's relatives have gathered. There, they brutally beat Murugan, and Aishwarya's father demands that she remove the mangalyam tied by Murugan. Fearing that Murugan's life is in danger if she disobeys, Aishwarya reluctantly agrees to marry another man to save him. Murugan is left beaten and abandoned at the farmland.

Years later, while traveling with her husband and child, Aishwarya unexpectedly comes across Murugan—now a mentally deranged beggar wandering near a traffic signal. Shocked, she faints and is admitted to a nearby hospital. That night, she runs from the hospital back to the signal and finds Murugan sitting there. Overcome with guilt and sorrow, she cries, feeling responsible for his tragic condition. Her husband arrives at the scene, understands the situation, and ensures Murugan receives proper care by admitting him to a mental health center and looking after him.

The movie concludes with title cards revealing that the story is based on a true incident, narrated to the director by the girl's husband during a train journey, which inspired the film.

== Cast ==
- Bharath as S. Murugan
- Sandhya as R. Aishwarya
- Sukumar as Stephen
- Dhandapani as Rajendran
- S. Krishna Murthy as Aishwarya's uncle
- Arun Kumar as Murugan's assistant
- Saravanan as aspiring director Bhagya
- Saranya as Sathya
- Pallu Babu as Viruchagakanth
- Muthuraman as Dhanasekaran
- Sivakumar as Aishwarya's husband
- Sridhar special appearance in the song "Pura Koondu"
- Soori as Mansion mate (uncredited)

== Production ==
=== Development ===
After the average response of his directorial debut film Samurai (2002), Balaji Sakthivel was supposed to again direct Vikram in a new venture which was later shelved. When Balaji was preparing a script for Vikram, he saw a school girl and a mechanic together; he believed they "won't end up with each other" due to differences in their societal and economic statuses and wrote a script on them while the ending was inspired from a true event that happened in Madurai which he came to know after his interaction with a passenger during a train journey. After many producers refused to do the film due to its "hard-hitting climax", Balaji narrated it to S. Shankar during the shoot of the latter's Anniyan (2005); Shankar agreed to produce the film after hearing the script.

=== Casting and filming ===
The film was initially turned down by actors Dhanush and Shanthanu Bhagyaraj, before Balaji consulted Shankar's advice for the lead role. Telugu actor Ram also auditioned for the lead role but was unsuccessful. After considering both Manikandan and Bharath from the cast of Boys (2003), Shankar chose Bharath to star in his production. For the female lead, the makers held discussions with Ileana D'Cruz and then Varalaxmi Sarathkumar, but the latter's father R. Sarathkumar was reluctant to let her become an actress at the time. The team then picked Saranya Nag, then a Class IX student, when cinematographer Vijay Milton referred her on to Balaji Sakthivel. She was initially considered to play the heroine in the film, but the role was later handed to Sandhya, after the director felt Saranya looked too young, Saranya later was chosen for the character of Sandhya's friend. Dhandapani from Madurai was selected to play Sandhya's father. He became popular with this film and adopted the film's title as Kaadhal Dhandapani. The film was prominently shot in Madurai, where the story is set. The first schedule was completed in 20 days and rest of the scenes were shot at locations in Chennai, Chalakudy and Munnar.

== Soundtrack ==
The film has eight songs composed by Joshua Sridhar making his debut. Haricharan made his singing debut with this film when he was 17, and went on to record three songs.

All lyrics are written by Na. Muthukumar.

Track listing
No.	Title	Singer(s)	Length
1.	"Poovum Pudikkudhu"	Krish, Pop Shalini, Tippu	3:29
2.	"Ivanthan"	Sunitha Sarathy	2:09
3.	"Thandattikarupaiyee"	Pop Shalini, Vidhya, Malar, Maalaiamma	5:45
4.	"Thottu Thottu"	Haricharan, Harini Sudhakar	5:41
5.	"Pura Koondu"	Suresh Peters, Harish Raghavendra, Tippu, Premji, Karunas, Nagoor E.M. Haneefa	5:31
6.	"Kiru Kiru"	Karthik, Pop Shalini	4:32
7.	"Unakkena Iruppaen"	Haricharan	6:16
8.	"Kaadhal"	Haricharan	4:03
Total length:			37:26

All lyrics are written by Veturi.

Telugu track list
No.	Title	Singer(s)	Length
1.	"Moolasandhu"	Karthik, Tippu, Srivardhini	6:03
2.	"Thandana Dappulatho"	Pop Shalini, Malathi Sharma, Srivardhini	5:40
3.	"Ithade"	Sunitha Sarathy	2:08
4.	"Mattilanti Nannu"	Haricharan, Harini Sudhakar	6:16
5.	"Puvvu Nachenu"	Karthik, Pop Shalini, Tippu	3:30
6.	"Janma Needele"	Haricharan	6:16
7.	"Gira Gira"	Karthik, Pop Shalini	5:02
Total length:			34:55

== Reception ==
Visual Dasan of Kalki praised the film for its realism and the cast performances. Malathi Rangarajan of The Hindu wrote, "Kadhal [..] apart, from the otherwise run of the mill story of calf love, elopement and the consequences thereof. Balaji Saktivel (story, screenplay, dialogue and direction) deserves full credit for the differently conceived drama in the end, where very little is actually said — the body language conveys it all" while praising the film's performances of cast and director's treatment of the film. Malini Mannath of Chennai Online wrote "A short simple tale, an equally simple narrative style, an unassuming lead pair with their people next-door looks, and some well coordinated performances all make for some fairly engaging viewing in ‘Kadhal’." G Ulaganathan from Deccan Herald wrote "There are a few minor flaws in the movie, like the climax when the lover boy suddenly becomes mad and the girl’s husband tries to give him treatment in a mental asylum".

== Box office ==
Produced on a budget of ₹ 1.25 crore, the film was a sleeper hit, recovering almost its entire budget from Chennai distribution territory. The Telugu dubbed version, Premisthe, was also a success.

== Controversy ==
St. Joseph Girl's Higher Secondary School, Madurai filed a case against the filmmakers for portraying their school in a negative light.

== Legacy ==
The film's success catapulted Bharath to fame. The screenplay was released in the form of a book in 2005.
