= The Grand Master (2026 film) =

- Theatrical release poster
- Directed by: Vettri Cheliyan
- Written by: Vettri Cheliyan
- Starring: Abarnathi; Lingesh; Vettri Cheliyan; Suresh Chandra Menon; Aswin Tamilarasi; Anbu
- Cinematography: Arjun Ravi; Gnanasekar R.S.
- Edited by: Ranjeet CK
- Music by: Dinesh Antony
- Production company: V6 Film PVT LTD
- Release date: 25 September 2026
- Country: India
- Language: Tamil

The Grand Master a 2026 Indian Tamil-language drama film written and directed by Vettri Cheliyan. Produced by V6 Film PVT LTD, the film stars Abarnathi, Lingesh, Aswin Tamilarasi and Vettri Cheliyan. It was released on 25 September 2026.

== Plot ==
Vellaiyamma, a sanitation worker, supports her son Nandhan's ambitions of becoming a chess player, despite the troubles they face such as caste discrimination and his rejection from chess academies.

== Cast ==
- Abarnathi as Vellaiyamma
- Lingesh
- Vettri Cheliyan
- Suresh Chandra Menon
- Aswin Tamilarasi as Nandhan
- Anbu

== Production ==
The film was initially tiled Narakappor and later changed to The Grand Master. The directorial debut of Vetri Cheliyan, he said it was inspired by his deceased friend's unrealised dream of becoming a chess player.

== Reception ==
Abhinav Subramanian of The Times of India gave 2.5 stars and wrote, "The film's insistence on making each milestone inspirational leaves the journey feeling preassembled. Triumph becomes routine when every match arrives ready for the highlight reel." Dina Thanthi wrote that the screenplay, which is based on true events, is a strength, though some scenes could be guessed. Rohini M of Cinema Express rated the film 2.5/5 but called it "a socially conscious film that not only entertains but also leaves the audience with thoughts to take back with them".
