= Enga Veetu Mapillai =

- Genre: Reality
- Presented by: Sangeetha Krish
- Starring: Arya
- Original language: Tamil
- No. of seasons: 1
- No. of episodes: 41

Production
- Production locations: Jaipur district, Rajasthan
- Running time: 50 minutes
- Production companies: Sol production; Line Producer; Shooting Star Films and Entertainment Anil Vanvala; Shalendra (Shailu) Suwalka

Original release
- Network: Colors Tamil
- Release: 20 February – 17 April 2018

Related
- The Bachelor

Enga Veetu Mapillai is a 2018 Tamil language matchmaking reality television show that aired on Colors Tamil from 20 February 2018 to 17 April 2018 for a total of 41 Episodes. The show ended on 17 April 2018.

== Participants ==
#	Participants	Place	Outcome
1	Malvena, 28; Model	Karnataka, India	Eliminated on 2 March 2018
2	Abarnathi, 22; Fashion Designer	Tamil Nadu, India	Eliminated on 10 April 2018
3	Gomathi, 24; IT Professional	Tamil Nadu, India	Quit show on 9 March 2018
4	Ayesha, 28; Banking Professional	Bahrain	Eliminated on 16 March 2018
5	Seethalakshmi Hariharan, 25; Banking Professional	Kerala, India	Finalist
6	Anu, 20; College Student	Kerala, India	Eliminated on 7 March 2018
7	Kuhasini, 28; Independent Artiste	Singapore	Eliminated on 27 March 2018
8	Naveena, 29; Model	Telangana, India	Eliminated on 2 April 2018
9	Suwetha, 24; Model	Tamil Nadu, India	Eliminated on 9 April 2018
10	Devasurya, 27; Singer	Kerala, India	Eliminated on 21 March 2018
11	Agatha, 26; Video Editor	Kerala, India	Finalist
12	Sriya, 25; Post-Graduate Student	Kerala, India	Eliminated on 30 March 2018
13	Saathvika, 28; Banking Professional	Karnataka, India	Eliminated on 22 March 2018
14	Ancy, 29; Training Consultant	Kerala, India	Eliminated on 2 March 2018
15	Janani Rajasingam, 31	Malaysia	Eliminated on 7 March 2018
16	Susana, 33; Radiation Therapist	Canada	Finalist

== Episode list ==
#	Date	Episode
1	20/2/2018	In the season premiere, Arya is introduced by the host Sangeetha to 11 girls who brought a gift each to make the first impression and he welcomed them to the palace with a bouquet of flowers. Anu is the youngest while Susana is the oldest of the lot. Sangeetha briefly explained the selection process which processed 70,000 calls worldwide and 8,000 online applications.
2	21/2/2018	Arya is introduced to the remaining 5 girls who brought a gift to impress him and he welcomed them to the palace with a bouquet of flowers. Later he gifted a token of love each to 3 girls - Kuhasini, Susana and Abarnathi - who impressed him the most. Abarnathi calls Arya by the pet name Barya.
3	22/02/2018	Tasked to write a love letter, 1 girl - Agatha - gets a reply, token of love and dinner date. Later, she reveals that she has a short temper.
4	23/02/2018	4 girls - Abarnathi, Sriya, Susana and Devasurya - won the cycling task. Later, Susana reveals that she is a divorcee with a son.
5	26/02/2018	3 girls - Seethalakshmi, Suwetha and Kuhasini - won the professional psychological compatibility evaluation task. Arya calls Seethalakshmi by the pet name Kunju Reloaded.
6	27/02/2018	4 girls - Agatha, Ancy, Seethalakshmi and Sriya - won the task of picking Arya's favourite book, colour, film, fruit, sport and sweet from a pile. But, a 5th girl - Naveena - is allowed for somehow not picking anything correctly despite clues.
7	28/02/2018	Arya's friend Varalaxmi is invited to select 2 girls, based on one-to-one interview with closest matching persona. The episode turns grim with contestants calling out each other's weaknesses in a Spin the bottle game.
8	01/03/2018	Varalaxmi selects 3 but reveals 2 girls only - Suwetha and Susana - by sending them on a surprise joint gym date with Arya. Later, Naveena is gifted a token of love for winning the cooking task with her Jamaican Kadhali Chicken dish. Meanwhile, Arya reveals his prawn allergy. Naveena calls Arya by the pet name Baby.
9	02/03/2018	As promised, Arya cooks for Naveena but prefers a dinner date. The episode featured the first elimination round of 2 girls - Ancy and Malvena - in a rose ceremony.
10	05/03/2018	The day begins with a crash course in self-defence by Sreeram, the instructor from International Krav Maga Federation. Later, the girls walk the ramp for assessment by fashion designer Nazia Syed and fashion choreographer Karun Raman.
11	06/03/2018	The girls walk the ramp again fully decked up, this time, for assessment by Arya. Sriya won the fashion task and is gifted a token of love.
12	07/03/2018	Suwetha emerged as the winner of a multi-level objective test for compatibility. She goes on a bike ride and is gifted a token of love on a date. The episode featured the second elimination round of 2 girls - Anu and Janani - in a rose ceremony.
13	08/03/2018	Arya's 3 friends from Tamil film industry, Shaam, Bharath and Kalaiyarasan, gatecrashed the palace to conduct an offhand Q&A session. The night ended with a dance party in honour of the 3 guests.
14	09/03/2018	Gomathi exits the show abruptly to attend her grandfather's funeral. The 3 guests suggest a freewheeling talent task which showcases the contestant's strengths. The girls begin romantic song, dance, mimicry and aerobics performances to woo Arya.
15	12/03/2018	Sriya won the freewheeling talent task and is gifted a second token of love. The 3 guests discuss their assessment of the girls who are likely to be a good match.
16	13/03/2018	Sriya expressed her love in Malayalam to make her morning date special for Arya. Later, Arya reveals the names of the 3 girls - Agatha, Suwetha and Susana - who are already close to his heart at this stage of the show. Sangeetha begins a new Truth or Dare-like task. The questions soon turn incisive triggering catfight and personal attacks. Nevertheless, Sangeetha reveals that the 3 guests had earlier chosen Abarnathi as the best match. She gets a surprise evening date for the first time.
17	14/03/2018	Susana won the Kolam task and is gifted a second token of love. Arya too faced the Uriyadi task successfully.
18	15/03/2018	Susana goes on a morning date in a hot air balloon. The girls hand over anonymously written personal queries to Sangeetha who passed them on to Arya. He reveals that he suffered a workout-related ACL tear recently. He also confessed to a 7-year relationship (before entering Kollywood) that failed despite attempts to register a marriage. Later, a confessional is arranged for the girls to be discreet in a one-to-one session with Arya. Saathvika breaks down after admitting a forced abortion.
19	16/03/2018	The episode featured the third elimination round of 1 girl - Ayesha - in a rose ceremony.
20	19/03/2018	The remaining 10 girls are divided into 2 teams for 3 outdoor tasks. Kuhasini's Team Basmati Rice dominated Abarnathi's Team Brown Rice in archery and prison walk tasks but lost the captain's innings of bubble bash. Team Brown Rice is declared the winner and goes camping. Suwetha entertains other contestants with mimicry. Meanwhile, Seethalakshmi talks off-camera with Arya.
21	20/03/2018	Arya's friends Shanthanu and his wife Kiki are invited to help assess the girls based on What If scenarios. They select Suwetha as the most mature of the lot. She is gifted a second token of love and goes on a double date with Arya and his friends. Arya recites an impromptu poem for Suwetha.
22	21/03/2018	Arya faced 3 tasks - visual, vocal and tactile - and recognised Kuhasini, Abarnathi and Agatha correctly. Each of the 3 girls gets a speed date. Kuhasini penned a song and set it in a tune to woo Arya. Abarnathi struggled to express herself and kissed him forcibly. Agatha calls Arya by the pet name Jammykka. Later he admits Agatha's charm impressed him the most. Arya also requested speed date with ambidextrous Devasurya for elimination.
23	22/03/2018	2 girls - Suwetha and Sriya - won the memory task. Suwetha goes on a poolside speed date. Later, Naveena gatecrashed Sriya's dinner date. The episode featured the fourth elimination round of 1 girl - Saathvika - in a rose ceremony.
24	23/03/2018	2 celebrities - Anuradha Krishnamurthy and Sujitha - are invited to help assess the girls. Susana recognised pulses and Kuhasini millets in the tactile task. Suwetha won the recipe recital task. Susana won the role-playing task. Overall, Susana is declared the best match and is gifted a third token of love.
25	26/03/2018	The girls go on stage to perform their favourite costumed character to be assessed by Arya donning the James Bond avatar. Seethalakshmi's fusion dance as Radha emerged as the most impressive of the lot. Later, the contestants call out each other's strengths and weaknesses in a knife game.
26	27/03/2018	Celebrity still photographer Karthik Srinivasan is invited to set up a pre-wedding photoshoot. The episode featured the fifth elimination round of 1 girl - Kuhasini - in a rose ceremony.
27	28/03/2018	Celebrity choreographer Sheriff Moideen is invited to assess the girls in partner dance task. Agatha is gifted the second token of love, beating Susana and Naveena, for perfect chemistry.
28	29/03/2018	Rajeswari Jakkamma, a palmist, is invited to predict the future of contestants. Later, video recordings of their parents are played.
29	30/03/2018	The episode featured the sixth elimination round of 1 girl - Sriya - in a rose ceremony. Stand-up comedian Robo Shankar is invited to entertain the girls.
30	02/04/2018	The girls get a speed date each being the last day in the palace. Arya took Agatha out to see the Taj Mahal. The episode featured the seventh elimination round of 1 girl - Naveena - in a rose ceremony.
31	03/04/2018	Arya meets Abarnathi's family in Kumbakonam of Thanjavur district.
32	04/04/2018	Arya meets Suwetha's family in Manapparai of Tiruchirappalli district.
33	05/04/2018	Arya visits Kerala to meet Seethalakshmi's family in Aluva of Ernakulam district and Agatha's family in Kasaragod of Kasaragod district.
34	06/04/2018	Arya meets Susana's family in Jaffna of Northern Province, Sri Lanka.
35	09/04/2018	Videos of home visits are shared with the girls. The episode featured the eighth elimination round of 2 girls - Suwetha and Abarnathi - in a rose ceremony.
36	10/04/2018	Abarnathi eliminated from the show. Other 3 finalists meet Arya's family in Chennai.
37	11/04/2018	The 3 finalists go shopping with their families for ritual costume and jewellery.
38	12/04/2018	Arya goes shopping for ritual costume. 3 eliminated girls - Abarnathi, Devasurya and Suwetha - are invited by News18 Tamil Nadu to talk about their experiences in the show. Later, Arya meets Susana's son. Bridal shower begins with the mehndi ceremony.
39	13/04/2018	3 celebrities - Varalaxmi, Kiki and Anandhi - are invited to entertain the girls with concert dance performances in the sangeet ceremony. Anuradha Krishnamurthy also makes a guest appearance.
40	16/04/2018	Arya and his friends Sangeetha, Sheriff Moideen, Premgi Amaren, Sneha and Prasanna entertain the girls with concert dance performances in the sangeet ceremony.
41	17/04/2018	In the season finale, the 3 finalists woo Arya with concert dance performances in the sangeet ceremony. Nevertheless, Arya hesitates to continue with the scheduled ninth and final elimination round of 2 girls in a rose ceremony on stage out of respect for their families. The show goes off-camera until a decision is reached.

== Call out order ==
#	1 (Ep9)	2 (Ep12)	3 (Ep19)	4 (Ep23)	5 (Ep26)	6 (Ep29)	7 (Ep30)	8 (Ep35)	9 (Ep41)
1	Abarnathi	Sriya	Sriya	Suwetha	Susana	Agatha	Seethalakshmi	Suzana	Susana Agatha Seethalakshmi
2	Kuhasini	Suwetha	Susana	Abarnathi	Abarnathi	Susana	Agatha	Agatha	Susana Agatha Seethalakshmi
3	Susana	Abarnathi	Suwetha	Kuhasini	Naveena	Suwetha	Susana	Seethalakshmi	Susana Agatha Seethalakshmi
4	Agatha	Devasurya	Agatha	Agatha	Sriya	Abarnathi	Suwetha	Abarnathi	
5	Naveena	Seethalakshmi	Kuhasini	Susana	Suwetha	Naveena	Abarnathi	Suwetha	
6	Suwetha	Gomathi	Seethalakshmi	Sriya	Seethalakshmi	Susana	Naveena		
7	Janani	Agatha	Naveena	Naveena	Agatha	Sriya			
8	Ayesha	Kuhasini	Devasurya	Seethalakshmi	Kuhasini				
9	Anu	Seethalakshmi	Saathvika	Saathvika					
10	Devasurya	Naveena	Abarnathi	Devasurya					
11	Gomathi	Ayesha	Ayesha						
12	Susana	Saathvika	Gomathi						
13	Sriya	Anu							
14	Saathvika	Janani							
15	Malvena								
16	Ancy								

The contestant received the token of love before the rose ceremony
The contestant received a rose during the date
The contestant is eliminated in a rose ceremony
The contestant is eliminated during the date
The contestant is eliminated outside the rose ceremony
The contestant quit the competition
The contestant won the competition

== Dubbed version ==
- This show, dubbed in Malayalam language as Aryakku Parinayam, aired on Flowers TV from 26 February 2018 Monday to Friday at 21:30 (IST).
