= Kaalidas 2 =

- Theatrical release poster
- Directed by: Sri Senthil
- Written by: Sri Senthil
- Produced by: K. Senthil; N. Yogeshwaran
- Starring: Bharath; Ajay Karthi; Sangita Madhavan Nair; Abarnathi; Bhavani Sre
- Cinematography: Suresh Bala
- Edited by: Bhuvan Srinivasan
- Music by: Sam C. S.
- Production companies: Sky Pictures; Five Star K. Senthil
- Release date: 3 April 2026
- Running time: 137 minutes
- Country: India
- Language: Tamil

Kaalidas 2 is a 2026 Indian Tamil-language crime thriller film written and directed by Sri Senthil. The film stars Bharath, Ajay Karthi, Sangita Madhavan Nair, Abarnathi and Bhavani Sre, with Ananth Nag, T. M. Karthik, Singam Jayavel, Prakash Raj, Kishore, Raja Ravindra and Suresh Chandra Menon in supporting roles. It is a standalone sequel to the director's 2019 film Kaalidas. The film, which was shot between July 2024 and February 2025, was released in theatres on 3 April 2026.

== Plot ==
Seven years ago, a senior lawyer Natarajan addresses a courtroom.

On 22 December 2025, police officer Kaalidas responds to a distress call at an isolated house in Meyyur. On arrival, he is attacked by a group of men, who flee the scene. Inside, Kaalidas discovers a man and a woman murdered by the woman's father.

At S.I.S. Apartment in Urapakkam, a junior lawyer, Stephen, stalks a family. A few days later, Kaalidas is informed about a plot to kill Perambur Murphy by a rival gang. Stephen and Pandya kidnap Murphy, and Stephen kills Murphy. The next day, Kaalidas finds Murphy's dead body.

During a celebration on New Year's Eve, Stephen kidnaps Mithra, the young girl from the family he has been seen stalking. Kaalidas's team arrives at S.I.S. Apartment to investigate. Assistant Commissioner of Police (ACP) Vaishnavi is also assigned to Mithra's case. They find a dead dog, and a resident identifies the owner's residence. The police break in to find a group of friends heavily drugged, but their dog is alive. CCTV footage shows Stephen with the same dog. Stephen is captured as a suspect in Murphy's murder case. It is revealed that seven years ago, Stephen raped and murdered a girl named Dhanya.

Mithra's dead body is found. Senior lawyer Natarajan arrives and releases Stephen due to a lack of evidence against him. Apartment Secretary, Roopa, informs Kaalidas and Vaishnavi that Roopa's daughter had seen Stephen with Mithra. Another girl, Harshitha, drowns in a swimming pool. During his release, Stephen kills one of Murphy's men.

With Natarajan's help, Kaalidas discovers that seven years ago, Mithra's mother was Stephen's girlfriend and a witness in Dhanya's case. Pandya reveals that Murphy's men killed Dhanya and that Stephen is innocent.

Kaalidas meets with Stephen and Stephen explains that he had given his dog to Mithra. With Stephen's help, Kaalidas finds evidence leading to Doctor Prasanna. Before the police can enter S.I.S. Apartment, Prasanna falls to his death. Kaalidas grows suspicious of Roopa, and Roopa explains everything.

It is revealed that one of the heavily drugged men frightened Roopa's daughter, Ananya, and Harshitha. Ananya mistakes Stephen's dog for the drugged man's dog and throws Stephen's dog off the roof. Mithra, who is with the dog, falls to her death while trying to save it. Roopa helps cover up Mithra's death, and Ananya frames Stephen. Ananya kills Harshitha when Harshitha wants to inform the police. Ananya pushes Prasanna off the roof when Prasanna confronts Roopa and Ananya. Stephen visits Roopa's house, and Ananya traps him.

Roopa sets the house on fire and dies, but Kaalidas manages to save Ananya. A trapped Stephen contacts Kaalidas.

Kaalidas understands everything and witnesses Ananya wake up with a smirk.

== Cast ==
- Bharath as Inspector S. Kaalidas
- Ajay Karthi as Stephen alias Steve
- Sangita Madhavan Nair as Roopa
- Abarnathi as Sanju
- Bhavani Sre as DSP Vaishnavi
- Ananth Nag as Gokul
- T. M. Karthik as Doctor Prasanna
- Singam Jayavel
- Prakash Raj as Advocate Natraj
- Kishore as Pandya
- Raja Ravindra as M. Dinakaran
- Suresh Chandra Menon as ACP George

== Production ==
Sri Senthil, director of the 2019 crime thriller film Kaalidas, wanted to make another crime thriller with a police officer as the lead. While writing the story, he decided to bring back the title character from the 2019 film as the protagonist, rather than create a new character. Sri Senthil said the film, despite its title, is a standalone story. The muhurat puja ceremony was held in Chennai in July 2024. Ajay Karthi made his cinematic acting debut, and Sangita Madhavan Nair joined the cast, marking her return to Tamil cinema after a 25-year hiatus. Principal photography began in July 2024, and wrapped in February 2025. The majority of portions were shot in Chennai, and a few in Kerala.

== Soundtrack ==
The music was composed by Sam C. S. Subramania Bharati's "Chinnanchiru Kiliye" was remixed and used in the film.

Track listing
No.	Title	Lyrics	Singer(s)	Length
1.	"Minmini Penne"	Mohan Rajan	Kapil Kapilan	2:50
2.	"Kaalidas Theme"	—	—	1:44
3.	"New Year Song"	Mohan Rajan	Shweta Mohan	3:09
4.	"Dance Song"	Mohan Rajan	Sam C. S.	3:06
5.	"Title Theme"	—	—	1:42
Total length:				12:31

== Release ==
Kaalidas 2 was initially scheduled to release on 10 April 2026, but was released a week early on 3 April (Good Friday) after Love Insurance Kompany, which was initially dated for 3 April, was postponed. The film was distributed by Ayngaran International in overseas markets. It began streaming on Lionsgate Play, Amazon Prime Video, Sun NXT, Aha, Tentkotta, Shortflix and Simply South from 12 May 2026. In June 2026, the film was screened at the 28th Shanghai International Film Festival.

== Reception ==
Abhinav Subramanian of The Times of India rated the film 2.5/5 stars and wrote, "There's a lot of activity in Kaalidas 2, but barely any momentum. Scenes arrive and pass in a hurry, and Sam C.S.'s score fills every gap, cueing dread the scenes themselves haven't earned. [...] The screenplay's biggest swing is a classic whodunit misdirection, and it does build some curiosity for a stretch". Prashanth Vallavan of Cinema Express rated the film 2/5 stars and wrote, "Refreshingly, the dialogue writing does something most recent Tamil films fail to do. [...] Packing a twist a minute in the last hour, everything feels rushed, and without the required focus, it feels like cartoon burglars tripping over each other". Bhuvanesh Chandar of The Hindu compared the film's plot twist to that of the prequel, "but every character served the story and not merely the final reveal. The sequel, which comes with a bigger canvas, cast and production value, comes across as an empty shell that's too desperate to impress".
