= Bharath (actor) =

Tamil actor (born 1981)

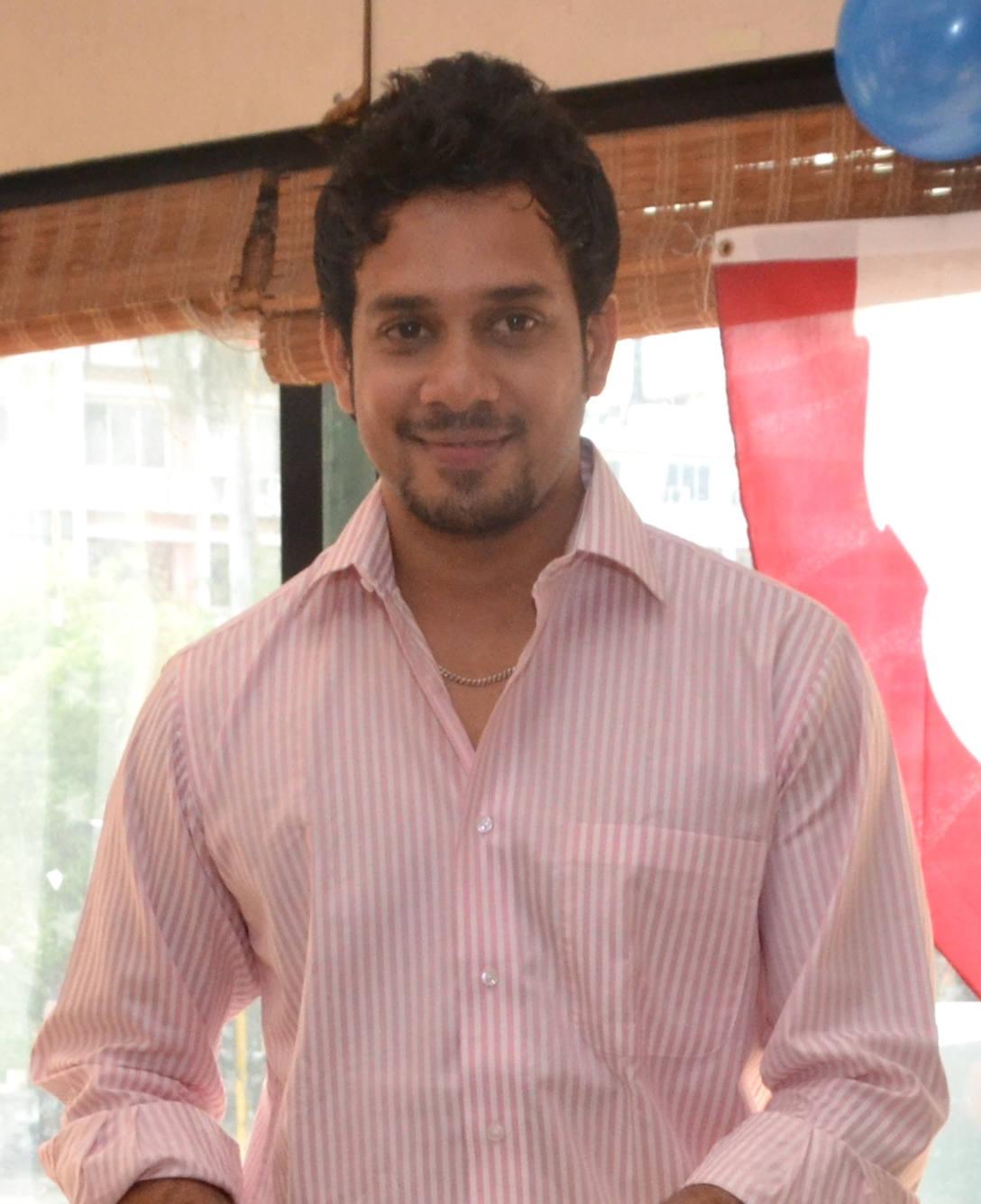
- Bharath in 2012
- Born: Bharath Srinivasan; 21 July 1983 (age 43); Trichy, Tamil Nadu, India
- Occupations: Actor; Dancer
- Years active: 2003–present
- Spouse: Jeshly (m. 2013)
- Children: 2

Bharath Srinivasan (born 21 July 1983), known professionally as Bharath, is an Indian actor, who works predominantly in Tamil cinema, along with few Malayalam, Hindi and Telugu films.

He made his acting debut in 2003 with S. Shankar's Boys. He made his Malayalam debut 4 the People (2004). Then, he played the antagonist character in Chellamae (2004).

He received his breakthrough as his first lead in the Tamil film Kaadhal (2004). Some of his other notable films include Pattiyal (2006), Em Magan (2006), Veyil (2006), Pazhani (2008), Kanden Kadhalai (2009), Vaanam (2011), Ainthu Ainthu Ainthu (2013), Kaalidas (2019) and Kaalidas 2 (2026).

== Early and personal life ==
Bharath Srinivasan was born into Trichy in Tamil Nadu, India. He is a trained dancer by profession and joined Swingers International Dance Club when he was 11 years old. He did his schooling at DAV Senior Secondary School. Bharath has a younger sister, Preethi.

He married childhood friend Jeshly, a Malayali dentist based in Dubai, on 9 September 2013 in Chennai. He has twin boys who were born in August 2018.

== Career ==
=== Debut and Breakthrough (2003–2009) ===
Bharath made his acting debut in the 2003 Tamil film Boys directed by S. Shankar, in which he played the guitarist of a boy band. He was selected for the role, after Shankar had seen him performing at a dance programme "Inspirations" at the Music Academy by Swingers. In 2004, he first appeared in the Malayalam film, the Jayaraj-directed vigilante film 4 The People, portraying one of the four protagonists. Later that year, he played the antagonist role in the Tamil film Chellamae. His portrayal of Vishwa, a possessive teenager who kidnaps his childhood friend whom he is obsessed with and although she has married someone else, was acclaimed by critics. He reprised his role from 4 The People in the Telugu remake Yuvasena. He played his first main lead role in Balaji Sakthivel's Tamil romantic-drama film Kaadhal that featured him as a poor mechanic who falls in love and elopes with a wealthy twelfth-standard student. The film, produced by Shankar, received critical acclaim and commercial success. Pattiyal, a gangster thriller, was his first release in 2006 and went to become a box office hit, with Bharath garnering accolades for his performance as a deaf and dumb hitman. Later that year, he starred in Azhagai Irukkirai Bayamai Irukkirathu, Em Magan, Chennai Kadhal and Veyil. While Chennai Kadhal, a romance film by Vikraman, bombed at the box office, Thirumurugan's family drama Em Magan was declared a hit film. He has received great accolades for Veyil.

Following Veyil, Bharath experienced a setback in his career as his subsequent releases—with the exception of Pazhani—proved to be commercially unsuccessful. He was facing an "image crisis" as he signed up for action and masala films and went on play repetitive roles as a "larger than life angry young man", playing "small town rowdy" or "guy seeking revenge" roles. Koodal Nagar, was released in 2007 in which he portrayed a dual role, which was a box office disaster. In 2008, he appeared in Perarasu's Pazhani alongside Kajal Aggarwal and Khushbu which was an average success, and then Nepali, directed by V. Z. Durai. That year he had two more releases, Muniyandi Vilangial Moonramandu, which saw him collaborating with the Em Magan team again, and Hari's Seval. In 2009 he acted in Arumugam, directed by Suresh Krishna and Kanden Kadhalai, the Tamil remake of the 2007 Bollywood film Jab We Met. The latter featured him in a totally contrasting role as a rich businessman, and became his only commercial success in two years.

=== Setbacks and success (2010–2013) ===
In 2010, he had a single release with Badri's Thambikku Indha Ooru which became a critical and commercial failure. In 2011, he appeared in the multi-starrer Vaanam as Bharath Chakravarthy, a guitarist. Post-release, Bharath clashed with the producer and another actor in the film, Silambarasan, claiming he did not receive as much promotion and publicity as Silambarasan's character. His next film, the romantic comedy Yuvan Yuvathi co-starring Rima Kallingal, was followed by Perarasu's action-masala film Thiruthani co-starring Sunaina. He also made a guest appearance in Vasanthabalan's Aravaan. In 2013, his romantic thriller film Ainthu Ainthu Ainthu released in August. The film, which was directed by Sasi, opened to positive reviews with a critic noting he "has put a lot of effort and hardwork to the role" and "is one single reason to watch the film". Ainthu Ainthu Ainthu is Bharath's only highest-grossing film in his career. Bharath made his Bollywood debut with Jackpot (2013). The film was about four people who try to con one another for money and Bharath played one of them, a Goan named Anthony D'Souza from Puducherry.

=== Career slump, struggle and resurgence (2014–present) ===
He returned to Malayalam cinema in 2014 with Koothara. Thereafter, he played his 25th movie in Aindhaam Thalaimurai Sidha Vaidhiya Sigamani (2014).The next was action film Killadi (2015). The film was released to negative reviews. Bharath subsequently appeared as autistic youngster in a Malayalam project titled 1000 – Oru Note Paranja Katha (2015), which garnered poor reviews on release. Later in 2015 he appeared in another Malayalam movie Lord Livingstone 7000 Kandi (2015), which was an experimental movie.

In 2017, he appeared in Ennodu Vilayadu and Kadugu directed by Vijay Milton was a solid comeback, but the film was an average hit. He has playing in the bilingual film Spyder starring Mahesh Babu directed by AR Murugadoss. Kadaisi Bench Karthi was released on 27 October and received negative reviews. It was a colossal flop. In 2019, Simba and Pottu was released. Kaalidas, which is directed by Sri Senthil, released in December 2019, featured Bharath as a cop for the first time in his career. The movie was a success for Bharath after a long time. The next is a Amazon Prime Video web series Time Enna Boss (2020). In 2021, Bharath plays as a cop in Hindi action movie Radhe with Salman Khan directed by Prabhu Deva. Bharath, who tasted success with a psychological thriller Kaalidas, also acted in another thriller Naduvan. He later starred in two Malayalam thriller movies: one with Dulquer Salmaan in Kurup and then another with the actors Lal and Ajmal Ameer in Kshanam.

In 2022, Bharath was seen in the thriller Last 6 Hours was bilingual thriller which is made in Malayalam and Tamil simultaneously followed by Miral. In 2023, the streaming series Story of Things was released at SonyLIV. He next acts in the Telugu action thriller Hunt in pivotal role. The romantic thriller Love, marks Bharath's 50th film. It a remake of the 2020 Malayalam film of the same name. This was followed by the Malayalam investigation thriller Samara, which was released to mixed reviews. In 2024, the romantic drama Ippadiku Kadhal, the web series Thalaimai Seyalagam as well as the hyperlink thriller film, Once Upon a Time in Madras was released. In 2025, he was seen in the political drama Veera Vanakkam. Following the success of Bharath's 2019 film Kaalidas, the actor will now be starring in its sequel titled Kaalidas 2. The actor will be reuniting with director Sri Senthil, who had helmed the original film. The film was released on 3 April 2026. He has garnered positive reviews for its fast-paced screenplay and gripping narration.

== Filmography ==
=== Films ===
Key
†	Denotes films that have not yet been released

Year	Film	Role	Language	Notes	Ref
2003	Boys	Babu Kalyanam (Bob Gally)	Tamil		
2004	4 the People	Vivek	Malayalam		
2004	Chellamae	Vishwa Rajasekhar	Tamil		
2004	Yuvasena	Vivek	Telugu		
2004	Kaadhal	Murugan	Tamil		
2005	February 14	Shiva	Tamil		
2006	Pattiyal	Selva	Tamil		
2006	Azhagai Irukkirai Bayamai Irukkirathu	Manu	Tamil		
2006	Em Magan	Krishna	Tamil		
2006	Chennai Kadhal	Gautham	Tamil		
2006	Veyil	Kathir	Tamil		
2007	Koodal Nagar	Suriyan and Chandran	Tamil	Dual role	
2008	Pazhani	Pazhanivel (Vellaiyan)	Tamil		
2008	Nepali	Karthik (Nepali / Bharathan)	Tamil		
2008	Muniyandi Vilangial Moonramandu	Muniyandi	Tamil		
2008	Seval	Murugesan	Tamil		
2009	Arumugam	Arumugam	Tamil		
2009	Kanden Kadhalai	Sakthivel Rajasekharan	Tamil		
2010	Thambikku Indha Ooru	Akilesh	Tamil	Also playback singer	
2011	Ko	Himself	Tamil	Cameo appearance in song "Aga Naga"	
2011	Vaanam	Bharath Chakravarthy	Tamil		
2011	Yuvan Yuvathi	Kathirvelmurugan	Tamil		
2012	Aravaan	Thogaimaan	Tamil	Guest appearance	
2012	Thiruthani	Velu / Thiruthani	Tamil		
2013	Ainthu Ainthu Ainthu	Aravind	Tamil		
2013	Jackpot	Anthony D'Souza	Hindi		
2014	Koothara	Koobrin	Malayalam		
2014	Kathai Thiraikathai Vasanam Iyakkam	Himself	Tamil	Cameo appearance	
2014	Aindhaam Thalaimurai Sidha Vaidhiya Sigamani	Sigamani	Tamil		
2015	Killadi	Dharani	Tamil		
2015	1000 – Oru Note Paranja Katha	Jikku Mon	Malayalam		
2015	Lord Livingstone 7000 Kandi	Shanmugan Ilangovan (Sam)	Malayalam		
2017	Ennodu Vilayadu	Vikram	Tamil		
2017	Kadugu	Nambi	Tamil		
2017	Spyder	Bhairavadu's brother	Telugu	Bilingual film	
2017	Spyder	Sudalai's brother	Tamil	Bilingual film	
2017	Kadaisi Bench Karthi	Karthi	Tamil		
2019	Simba	Mahesh	Tamil		
2019	Pottu	Arjun	Tamil		
2019	Kaalidas	Inspector S. Kaalidas	Tamil		
2021	Radhe	Sarvesh	Hindi		
2021	Naduvan	Karthik	Tamil		
2021	Kurup	Izaakh	Malayalam		
2021	Kshanam	Aravind	Malayalam		
2022	Last 6 Hours	Shaun Morris	Malayalam	Bilingual film	
2022	Last 6 Hours	Shaun Morris	Tamil	Bilingual film	
2022	Miral	Hari	Tamil		
2023	Hunt	Aryan Dev	Telugu		
2023	Love	Ajay	Tamil		
2023	Samara	Zakir Rasa Khan	Malayalam		
2024	Ippadiku Kadhal	Shiva	Tamil		
2024	Once Upon A Time in Madras	Raja	Tamil		
2025	Veera Vanakkam	Raja Mahendran	Tamil		
2026	Kaalidas 2	Inspector S. Kaalidas	Tamil		
2026	Gods and Soldiers †	TBA	Tamil	Delayed	

=== Television ===
Year	Program	Role	Language	Note
2011	Jodi Number One Season 6	Judge	Tamil	Star Vijay
2015	Jodi Number One Season 7	Judge	Tamil	Star Vijay
2019	Kerala Dance League	Judge	Malayalam	Amrita TV
2024	Sa Re Ga Ma Pa Seniors 4	Ram	Tamil	Zee Tamil

=== Web series ===
Year	Program	Role	Language	Note
2020	Time Enna Boss	Bala	Tamil	Amazon Prime Video
2023	Story of Things	Ram	Tamil	SonyLIV
2024	Thalaimai Seyalagam	Inspector Manigandan	Tamil	ZEE5
2026	Panchanama	Jai Ram	Telugu	Zee Telugu
