= List of Tamil films of 2021 =

This is a list of Tamil language films produced in the Tamil cinema in India that were released or schedule to release in 2021.

== Box office collection ==
The highest-grossing Tamil films released in 2021, by worldwide box office gross revenue, are as follows:

Highest worldwide gross of 2021
Rank	Film	Production company	Worldwide gross	References
1	Master	XB Film Creators	₹300 crore	(Note: Master's reported worldwide grosses vary between ₹228 crore (The Indian Express) – 230 crore (Box Office India) – ₹228 crore (India Today) – ₹228 crore (The News Minute))
2	Annaatthe	Sun Pictures	₹240 crore	
3	Maanaadu	V House Productions	₹117 crore	
4	Doctor	KJR Studios; SK Productions	₹100 crore	
5	Karnan	V Creations	₹67.25 crore	
6	Aranmanai 3	Avni Cinemax	₹51 crore (equivalent to ₹62 crore or US$6.5 million in 2026)	

== Released films ==
=== January – March ===
Opening		Title	Director	Cast	Studio	Ref
J A N	1	Aathikka Varkkam	Bagavathy Bala	Bagavathy Bala, Brintha Ravi, Nagma	S Films	
J A N	1	Pei Irukka Bayamen	Kaarthieswaran	Kaarthieswaran, Gayatri Rema, Muthukaalai	Thilaka Arts	
J A N	8	Kulasekara Pattinam	Aalwan	James, Sreedevi, Aalwan	James International Films	
J A N	8	Maara	Dhilip Kumar	Madhavan, Shraddha Srinath, Sshivada	Pramod Films	
J A N	8	Pachaikili	Sri Sai MK Selvam	Gypsy Rajkumar, Hema, Babu	LK Productions	
J A N	8	V	Davinci Saravanan	Raaghav, Luthiya, Sabitha Anand	True Soul Pictures	
J A N	13	Master	Lokesh Kanagaraj	Vijay, Vijay Sethupathi, Malavika Mohanan	XB Film Creators	
J A N	14	Bhoomi	Lakshman	Jayam Ravi, Nidhhi Agerwal, Ronit Roy	Home Movie Makers	
J A N	14	Amanuda	S.S. Jishnu Dev	Harikrishnan,Sivaprasad,Jinu Celine, Arya, Sree Vishnu JS , Sahil Mikhdad , Anas J Rahim, T Sunil Punnakkad	Austria Movie Productions, Artist Films	
J A N	14	Eeswaran	Suseenthiran	Silambarasan, Nidhhi Agerwal, Nandita Swetha	Madhav Media	
J A N	15	Pulikkuthi Pandi	M. Muthaiah	Vikram Prabhu, Lakshmi Menon, Samuthirakani	Sun Entertainment	
J A N	22	E P KO 306	Sai	Thara Palanivel, Cheenu Mohan, Sai,	Sai Pictures	
J A N	29	Enga Ooru Pookari	Vasatha Saker	Vasatha Saker, Prakash Shanmugam	Sri Rengaraj Talkies	
J A N	29	Kabadadaari	Pradeep Krishnamoorthy	Sibi Sathyaraj, Nandita Swetha, Nassar	Creative Entertainers and Distributors	
J A N	29	Keelakadu	Satyamoorthi Jeyaguru	Ajay Karthik, Suresh, Suganya	Sathiya Sutha Creations	
J A N	29	Kook Giramam	K. Raman	Shiva, Anitha Selvaraj	SLB Movies	
J A N	29	Sencholai	Farook	Farook	Farook Films	
F E B	5	Aatkal Thevai	Sakthi Sivan	Sakthi Sivan, Eeasan Natarajan, Mime Gopi	A4S Cinemas	
F E B	5	Chidambaram Railway Gate	Sivabalan	Anbu Mayilsamy, Mahendran, Neeraja, Gayatri Rema	Crown Pictures	
F E B	5	Kalathil Santhippom	N. Rajasekhar	Jiiva, Arulnithi, Manjima Mohan, Priya Bhavani Shankar	Super Good Films	
F E B	5	Trip	Dennis Manjunath	Yogi Babu, Sunainaa, Rajendran, Karunakaran	Sai Film Studios	
F E B	12	C/o Kaadhal	Hemambar Jasti	Vetri, Mumtaz Sorcar, Diphan	Shri Shirdi Sai Movies	
F E B	12	Idhu Vibathu Paghuthi	Vijay Thirumoolam	Sasi, Anu Krishna, Thennavan	Rekha Movies	
F E B	12	Kasa Kasaa	Tamil Sudar	Sampath Ram, Saivinoth, Rajesh, Praveen	Sudarnila Creations	
F E B	12	Kutty Story	Four directors	Vijay Sethupathi, Gautham Vasudev Menon, Varun	Vel Films International	
F E B	12	Naanum Single Thaan	R. Gopi	Dinesh, Deepti Sati, Rajendran, Manobala	Three is a Company Production	
F E B	12	Parris Jeyaraj	K. Johnson	Santhanam, Anaika Soti, Prudhvi Raj, Rajendran	Lark Studios	
F E B	19	Aangal Jakiradhai	K. S. Muthu Manoharan	Muruganandham, Gemini Raakava, Sangeetha	Gemini Cinemas	
F E B	19	Chakra	M. S. Anandan	Vishal, Shraddha Srinath, Regina Cassandra	Vishal Film Factory	
F E B	19	Kamali From Nadukkaveri	Rajasekar Duraiswamy	Anandhi, Rohit Suresh Saraf, Azhagam Perumal	Abbundu Studios	
F E B	19	Loka	D. S. Divakar	Yogenthra, Akshatha Madhav, Crane Manohar	JPS Cine Max	
F E B	19	Pazhagiya Naatkal	Ramdev	Meeran, Meghana, Srinath, Nellai Siva	Ramdev Pictures	
F E B	19	Sillu Vandugal	Suresh K. Vengidi	TK Narayanan, Arunachalam, Santhoshraja	Saranya 3D Screens	
F E B	26	Calls	J. Sabarish	V. J. Chitra, Vinodhini, Devadarshini, R. Sundarrajan	Infinite Pictures	
F E B	26	Centha	Sagayanathan	Deepa Umapathy, Sri Mahesh, Chaams	Sri Chithra Pournami Films	
F E B	26	Chennayil Oda Oda	Sanjeevi	Gurumuruga, Kasi Vishwanathan, Kannan	Vishnu Movie Makers	
F E B	26	Paathi Unakku Paathi Enakku	M. A. Vijayakumar	Aryan, Saravanan, Swati, Divyasri	White Box Production	
F E B	26	Sangathalaivan	Manimaran	Samuthirakani, Ramya Subramanian, Sunu Lakshmi	Grass Root Film Company	
F E B	26	Sariya Thavara	S. Savarimuthu	Savarimuthu, Kadhal Sukumar, Bonda Mani	PSA Thirai Kalanchiyam	
F E B	26	Vettai Naai	S. Jai Shankar	R. K. Suresh, Ramki, Subiksha	Surabi Pictures	
F E B	28	Aelay	Halitha Shameem	Samuthirakani, Manikandan, Madhumathi	YNOT Studios	
M A R	5	Anbirkiniyal	Gokul	Arun Pandian, Keerthi Pandian, Praveen Raja	A & P Groups	
M A R	5	Dola	Aadhi Chandran	Rishi Rithvik, Prerna Khanna	Joker's Creation	
M A R	5	Mirugaa	J. Parthiban	Srikanth, Raai Laxmi, Dev Gill	Jaguar Studios	
M A R	5	Nenjam Marappathillai	Selvaraghavan	S. J. Suryah, Regina Cassandra, Nandita Swetha	Escape Artists Motion Pictures	
M A R	5	Oru Kudaikul	K. L. Udhya Kumar	Ananth Nag, Meghna, Nirosha	ASS Cine Creations	
M A R	5	Seithi Thaal	Punch Bharath	Punch Bharath, Sathan, Yogi, Najeer	Taken Entertainment	
M A R	12	Aadhangam	Jayakaran	Appukutty, Bala Singh, Karate Raja	AM Arts	
M A R	12	Boom Boom Kaalai	K. P. Velmurugan	Kevin, Saara Deva, Appukutty	Oliemar Cinemas	
M A R	12	Ganesapuram	Veerangan	Chinna, Risha Haridas, Florent Pereira	Sanjay Sham Pictures	
M A R	12	Teddy	Shakti Soundar Rajan	Arya, Sayyeshaa, Magizh Thirumeni	Studio Green	
M A R	12	Theethum Nandrum	Rasu Ranjith	Rasu Ranjith, Aparna Balamurali, Lijomol Jose	NH Hari Silverscreens	
M A R	19	Kadampari	Arul	Arul, Kaashima Rafi, Akila Narayanan	Aromaa Studios	
M A R	19	Meendum Yathra	Murugan	Murugan, Amala	Sri Saai Lakshmi Pictures	
M A R	19	Michaelpatty Raja	Francis	Nikesh Ram, Perlene Bhesania, Rajendran	Spellbound Films	
M A R	19	Namma Oorukku Ennadhan Achu	Nel Senthil Kumar	Mahendran, Miyasree Sowmya, Appukutty	GS Arts	
M A R	19	Thaen	Ganesh Vinayakan	Tharun, Abarnathi, Aruldoss	AP Productions	
M A R	20	Irai Thedal	K. S. Karthik	Krishnajith, Sanuja Somanath, Supriya Ravi	Kanda Films	
M A R	26	Engada Iruthinga Ivvalavu Naala	Kevin	Akhil, Ishaara Nair, Yogi Babu	Nila Promotes	
M A R	26	Ennathaan Un Kathai	John	John, Thilija, Telephone Raj	Try Creations	
M A R	26	Kaadan	Prabhu Solomon	Rana Daggubati, Vishnu Vishal, Zoya Hussain	Eros International	
M A R	26	Roommate	Vasanth Nagarajan	Naren, Sowmya, Vishwa	Sivasai Movies	
M A R	26	Thodakkam	Mari Karunanidhi	Mari Karunanidhi	Nithitha Thiraikalam	

=== April – June ===
Opening		Title	Director	Cast	Studio	Ref
A P R	2	Call Taxi	Pa. Pandian	Santhosh Saravanan, Ashwini Chandrasekhar, Rajendran, Madhan Bob	KT Combines	
A P R	2	Manja Satta Pacha Satta	Thambakutty	Guru Somasundaram, Lanza del Vasto, Shivashankar	Chinnasamy Cine Creations	
A P R	2	Sulthan	Bakkiyaraj Kannan	Karthi, Rashmika Mandanna, Napoleon, Lal	Dream Warrior Pictures	
A P R	4	Mandela	Madonne Ashwin	Yogi Babu, Sheela Rajkumar, Sangili Murugan	YNOT Studios	
A P R	9	Karnan	Mari Selvaraj	Dhanush, Lal, Rajisha Vijayan	V Creations	
A P R	11	Sarbath	Prabhakaran	Kathir, Rahasya Gorak, Soori	7 Screen Studio	
A P R	14	Mathil	Mithran Jawahar	K. S. Ravikumar, Shanjith, Mime Gopi	S S Group	
A P R	14	Paramapadham Vilayattu	K. Thirugnanam	Trisha, Nandha, Richard, Vijay Varmaa	24HRS Productions	
A P R	16	Chasing	K. Veerakumar	Varalaxmi Sarathkumar, Bala Saravanan, Imman Annachi	Asia Sin Media	
A P R	16	Munna	Sangai Kumaresan	Sangai Kumaresan, Kennedy, Niyah Krishna	Sri Thillai Eesan Pictures	
A P R	16	Vanakkam Da Mappillai	M. Rajesh	G. V. Prakash Kumar, Amritha Aiyer, Daniel Annie Pope	Sun Entertainment	
A P R	23	Nayae Peyae	Sakthi Vasan	Dinesh, Aishwarya, Aadukalam Murugadoss	Cutting Votting Studios	
A P R	23	Papillon	Aaru Raja	Aaru Raja, Sowmya, Kalloori Vinoth	Blooming Art Studios	
M A Y	28	Malaysia to Amnesia	Radha Mohan	Vaibhav, Vani Bhojan, Riya Suman, M. S. Bhaskar	ZEE5	
J U N	18	Jagame Thandhiram	Karthik Subbaraj	Dhanush, James Cosmo, Joju George, Aishwarya Lekshmi	YNOT Studios	
J U N	25	Methagu	T. Kittu	Kutti Mani, Lizzie Antony, Rajasekar	Tamil Eela Thirakkalam	
J U N	25	Maadathy	Leena Manimekalai	Semmalar Annam, Ajmina Kassim, Arul Kumar, Patrick Raj	Karuvachy Films	

=== July – September ===
Opening		Title	Director	Cast	Studio	Ref
J U L	11	Vellai Yaanai	Subramaniam Siva	Samuthirakani, Yogi Babu, Athmiya Rajan	Sun Entertainment	
J U L	16	Vaazhl	Arun Prabu Purushothaman	Pradeep Anthony, TJ Bhanu, Diva Dhawan	Sivakarthikeyan Productions	
J U L	22	Sarpatta Parambarai	Pa. Ranjith	Arya, Dushara Vijayan, Pasupathy, Kalaiyarasan	Neelam Productions	
J U L	30	Thittam Irandu	Vignesh Karthick	Aishwarya Rajesh, Pavel Navageethan, Gokul Anand	Sixer Entertainment	
A U G	11	Sennai	Jaikumar Sethuraman	Semmalar Annam, Bava Chelladurai, Gokila	Enso Pictures	
A U G	13	Netrikann	Milind Rau	Nayanthara, Ajmal Ameer, Manikandan	Rowdy Pictures	
A U G	22	Boomika	Rathindran R. Prasad	Aishwarya Rajesh, Avantika Vandanapu, Pavel Navageethan	Stone Bench Films	
A U G	27	Kasada Thapara	Chimbu Deven	Sundeep Kishan, Harish Kalyan, Venkat Prabhu	Black Ticket Company	
A U G	30	Ashvamithra	Earthling Koushalya	Harish Uthaman, Tareetha, Maheswari Arunagiri	Accessible Horizon Films	
S E P	3	Alpha Adimai	Jinovi	Vinod Varma, Arun Nagaraj, Kalki	Arunaajadaa Pictures	
S E P	3	Devadas Brothers	Janakiraman	Dhruvva, Sanchita Shetty, Shilpa Manjunath	Etcetera Entertainment	
S E P	9	Laabam	S. P. Jananathan	Vijay Sethupathi, Shruti Haasan, Jagapathi Babu	Vijay Sethupathi Productions	
S E P	10	Dikkiloona	Karthik Yogi	Santhanam, Anagha, Shirin Kanchwala	KJR Studios	
S E P	10	Thalaivii	A. L. Vijay	Kangana Ranaut, Arvind Swamy, Samuthirakani	Zee Studios	
S E P	10	Tughlaq Durbar	Delhi Prasad Deenadayal	Vijay Sethupathi, Raashi Khanna, Parthiban	Seven Screen Studio	
S E P	16	Iruvar Ullam	G. Ramesh	Vinay Rai, Payal Rajput, Archanna Guptaa	MSK Film Production	
S E P	17	Annabelle Sethupathi	Deepak Sundarrajan	Vijay Sethupathi, Taapsee Pannu, Radhika Sarathkumar	Passion Studios	
S E P	17	Friendship	John Paul Raj-Sham Surya	Arjun, Harbhajan Singh, Losliya Mariyanesan	Seantoaa Films	
S E P	17	Kodiyil Oruvan	Ananda Krishnan	Vijay Antony, Aathmika, Divya Prabha	Infiniti Film Ventures	
S E P	24	Choo Mandhirakaali	Eswar Kotravai	Karthikeyan Velu, Sanjana Burli, Kishore Dev	Annam Medias, A. Sarkunam	
S E P	24	Chinnanjiru Kiliye	Sabarinathan	Senthil Nathan, Sandra Nair, Kulappulli Leela	Senbha Creations	
S E P	24	Cinderella	Vinoo Venketesh	Raai Laxmi, Sakshi Agarwal, Robo Shankar	SSI Productions	
S E P	24	Naduvan	Sharran Kumar	Bharath, Aparna Vinod, Gokul Anand	Cue Entertainment	
S E P	24	Pei Mama	Sakthi Chidambaram	Yogi Babu, Rajendran, Malavika Menon	Bakiya Cinemass	
S E P	24	Pirar Thara Vaaraa	A. R. Kamaraj	A. R. Kamaraj, Sampath Ram, Rudran	ARK Creations	
S E P	24	Raame Aandalum Raavane Aandalum	Arisil Moorthy	Mithun Manickam, Ramya Pandian, Vani Bhojan	2D Entertainment	
S E P	24	Veerapuram 220	B. Senthil Kumar	Mahesh, Amira Varma, Meghna	Subham Cine Creations	
S E P	30	Sivakumarin Sabadham	Hiphop Tamizha Aadhi	Hiphop Tamizha Aadhi, Madhuri Jain	Sathya Jyothi Films	

=== October – December ===
Opening		Title	Director	Cast	Studio	Ref
O C T	1	Lift	Vineeth Varaprasad	Kavin, Amritha Aiyer	Ekaa Entertainment	
O C T	1	Rudra Thandavam	Mohan G.	Richard, Gautham Vasudev Menon, Dharsha Gupta	GM Film Corporation	
O C T	3	Endraavathu Oru Naal	Vetri Duraisamy	Vidharth, Remya Nambeeshan	The Theatre People	
O C T	8	Agaligai	C. Prabhakaran	Felina, Praveen, Mani, Simon	SPK Productions	
O C T	8	Appathava Aattaya Pottutanga	N. Stephen Rangaraj	Chandrahasan, Sheela, Ilavarasu, Delhi Ganesh	GB Studio Films	
O C T	8	Dham Dhum Kalyanam	A. Madasaamy	Mohan Raj, Vijayalakshmi	Sri Santha Durgai Amman Movies	
O C T	8	Mughizh	Karthik Swaminathan	Vijay Sethupathi, Regina Cassandra, Sreeja	Vijay Sethupathi Productions	
O C T	9	Doctor	Nelson Dilipkumar	Sivakarthikeyan, Priyanka Mohan, Vinay Rai	Sivakarthikeyan Productions	
O C T	13	Vinodhaya Sitham	Samuthirakani	Thambi Ramaiah, Samuthirakani, Deepak Dinkar	ZEE5	
O C T	14	Aranmanai 3	Sundar C	Sundar C, Arya, Raashi Khanna, Andrea Jeremiah	Avni Cinemax	
O C T	14	Udanpirappe	Era. Saravanan	Jyothika, M. Sasikumar, Samuthirakani	2D Entertainment	
O C T	22	Agadu	Suresh Kumar	John Vijay, Anjali Nair, Siddharth	Shoundaryan Pictures	
O C T	22	Filter Gold	Vijayabaskar	Vijayabaskar, Dora Sree	Survival Pictures	
O C T	22	Insha Allah	Bhaskaran	Mogli Mohan, Menaka	Nesam Entertainment	
O C T	22	Kaayam	A. Tamilselvan	Seran Raj, Anisha, Saravanan	Mara Movies	
O C T	22	Kattam Solludhu	S. G. Ezhilan	S. G. Ezhilan, Deepa Shankar, Thidiyan	Ganesan Productions	
O C T	22	Naruvi	Raja Muralidharan	Chella, Anamika, Imman Annachi	Muruga Films	
O C T	22	Oh Manapenne!	Kaarthikk Sundar	Harish Kalyan, Priya Bhavani Shankar, Venu Arvind	Madhav Media	
O C T	29	4 Sorry	Sakthivel	John Vijay, Kaali Venkat, Sakshi Agarwal	Safety Dream Production	
O C T	29	Chinna Pannai Periya Pannai	Bagavathy Bala	Bonda Mani, R. Sundarrajan, Bagavathy Bala	S Films	
O C T	29	IPC 376	Ramkumar Subbaraman	Nandita Swetha, Madhusudhan Rao, Mahanadi Shankar	Power King Studio	
O C T	29	Mullil Panithuli	N. M. Jegan	Nishanth, Vinitha	Trendz Movies	
O C T	29	Yennanga Sir Unga Sattam	Prabhu Jeyaram	R. S. Karthik, Ayra, Soundarya Bala Nandakumar	Passion Studios	
N O V	2	Jai Bhim	T. J. Gnanavel	Suriya, Rajisha Vijayan, Lijomol Jose, Prakash Raj	2D Entertainment	
N O V	4	Annaatthe	Siva	Rajinikanth, Nayanthara, Keerthy Suresh	Sun Pictures	
N O V	4	Enemy	Anand Shankar	Vishal, Arya, Mirnalini Ravi	Mini Studios	
N O V	4	MGR Magan	Ponram	Sasikumar, Sathyaraj, Mirnalini Ravi	Screen Scene Media Entertainment	
N O V	4	Operation Jujupi	Arunkanth	Chaams, Manobala, Vinodhini Vaidyanathan	Info Pluto Media Works	
N O V	19	Adayala Meetpu	Arasu	Arasu, Bayilvan Ranganathan	R Pictures International	
N O V	19	Cinema Kanavugal	Prabu Ramanujam	Bagavathy Bala, Ambani Shankar, Powerstar Srinivasan	Ramanujam Bagyam Movies	
N O V	19	Jango	Mano Karthikeyan	Satheesh Kumar, Mirnalini Ravi, Hareesh Peradi	Thirukumaran Entertainment	
N O V	19	Kadaseela Biriyani	Nishanth Kalidindi	Vasanth Selvam, Vijay Ram, Hakkim Shah, Dinesh Mani	Panoramaas Production	
N O V	19	Pon Manickavel	A. C. Mugil Chellappan	Prabhu Deva, Nivetha Pethuraj, Suresh Chandra Menon	Jhabak Movies	
N O V	19	Sabhaapathy	Srinivasa Rao	Santhanam, Preeti Verma, M. S. Bhaskar	RK Entertainment	
N O V	19	Singapaarvai	JK	Varalaxmi Sarathkumar, Bharath Reddy, Ravi Kale	Sai Samrat Movies	
N O V	25	Maanaadu	Venkat Prabhu	Silambarasan, S. J. Surya, Kalyani Priyadarshan	V House Productions	
N O V	26	Ainthu Unarvugal	Gnana Rajasekaran	Sujitha, Shreya Anchan, Sriranjani, Sathyapriya	Aram Productions	
N O V	26	Raajavamsam	K. V. Kathirvelu	M. Sasikumar, Nikki Galrani, Radha Ravi	Chendur Film International	
N O V	26	Rs 2000	Rudhran	Bharathi Krishnakumar, Ayyanathan, Karate Venkatesh	Phoenix Thirai Padaipagam	
N O V	26	Sivaranjiniyum Innum Sila Pengalum	Vasanth	Lakshmi Priyaa Chandramouli, Parvathy Thiruvothu	Hamsa Productions	
N O V	26	Vanam	Srikantan Anand	Vetri, Anu Sithara, Smruthi Venkat	Golden Star Productions	
D E C	3	Aal Illatha Oorla Annanthan MLA	Bagavathy Bala	Selva, Anitha, Meera Krishnan	S Films	
D E C	3	Bachelor	Sathish Selvakumar	G. V. Prakash Kumar, Divyabharathi	Axess Film Factory	
D E C	3	Chithirai Sevvaanam	Silva	Samuthirakani, Pooja Kannan, Rima Kallingal	Think Big Studios	
D E C	3	Kayamai Kadakka	Kiran	Masanth, Vatsan, Nagarajan Kannan	Independent Mind Films	
D E C	9	Jail	Vasanthabalan	G. V. Prakash Kumar, Abarnathy, Radhika Sarathkumar	Studio Green	
D E C	10	3:33	Nambikkai Chandru	Sandy, Gautham Vasudev Menon, Shruthi Selvam	Bamboo Trees Productions	
D E C	10	Anti Indian	Elamaran	Elamaran, Aadukalam Naren, Radha Ravi	Moon Pictures	
D E C	10	Ikk	Babu Tamizh	Yogesh, Guru Somasundaram, Anicka Vikhraman	Dharmraj Films	
D E C	10	Murungakkai Chips	Srijar	Shanthanu Bhagyaraj, Athulya Ravi, Yogi Babu	Libra Productions	
D E C	10	Oomai Sennaai	Arjunan Ekalaivan	Michael Thangadurai, Sanam Shetty	Life Goes On Pictures	
D E C	10	Uthra	Naveen Krishna	Vishwa, Raksh Raj, Kausalya	Rekha Movies	
D E C	17	Irudhi Pakkam	Mano Kannathasan	Amrutha Srinivasan, Rajesh Balachandran	An Insomniac's Dream Creation	
D E C	17	Minmini	Rajvikram	Sukisha Perarasu, Perarasu	Selvam Ponnaiyan	
D E C	17	R23 Criminal's Diary	Goutham Raghavendra	Jega, Yashika Aannand, Pavithra Lakshmi	Rascalz Pictures	
D E C	17	Varisi	Karthik Doss	Karthik Doss, Sapna Das, Jangiri Madhumitha	Red Flicks Film Factory	
D E C	23	Rocky	Arun Matheswaran	Vasanth Ravi, Bharathiraja, Raveena Ravi	RA Studios	
D E C	24	Anandham Vilayadum Veedu	Nandha Periyasamy	Gautham Karthik, Cheran, Shivathmika Rajasekhar	Sri Vaari Film	
D E C	24	Blood Money	Sarjun KM	Priya Bhavani Shankar, Shirish, Kishore	ZEE5	
D E C	24	Thalli Pogathey	R. Kannan	Atharvaa, Anupama Parameswaran, Amitash Pradhan	Masala Pix	
D E C	24	Thuneri	Sunil Dixon	John Vijay, Nivin Karthik, Miyasree Soumya	Shadow Light Entertainment	
D E C	24	Writer	Franklin Jacob	Samuthirakani, Ineya, Dileepan	Neelam Productions	
D E C	30	Plan Panni Pannanum	Badri Venkatesh	Rio Raj, Remya Nambeesan, M. S. Bhaskar	Positive Print Studios	
D E C	31	Chillaattaa	Shiva Rahul	Vijeeth, Amayra Baradhwaj	Shivagnanam Films	
D E C	31	EPCO 302	Salangai Durai	Kasthuri, Naga Sakthi, Rabin Prabhu	South Indian Productions	
D E C	31	Kaatupura	Babu Ganesh	Rishikanth, Nethra, Mathanica	Bala Vignesh Creations	
D E C	31	Karaiyerum Kanavugal	K. P. S. Saamy	Rajesh Balakrishnan, Neenu, Sandra Babu	Sri Guru Creations	
D E C	31	Labour	Sathyapathi	Muthu, Saranya Ravichandran, Murugan	Royal Fortuna Creations	
D E C	31	Madurai Manikuravar	K. Raja Rishi	Harikumar, Maadhavi Latha, M. S. Bhaskar	Banner Kalayappa Pictures	
D E C	31	Meendum	Saravana Subbiah	Kathiravan, Saravana Subbiah, Anagha	Hero Cinemas	
D E C	31	Mounika	S. V. Samppathkumar	Rubesh, Archana Singh, Livingston	Sree Vaari Movie Makers	
D E C	31	Obama Ungalukkaaga	Nani Bala	Prithvi Rajan, Poornisha, Janagaraj	JBJ Films	
D E C	31	Onaan	Sennan	Thiru Murugan, Shilpa Manjunath, Kaali Venkat	Elephant Fly Entertainment	
D E C	31	Sarkarai Thookalai Oru Punnagai	Mahesh Padmanabhan	Rudhraa, Subiksha Krishnan	Nabeeha Movie Productions	
D E C	31	Tamil Rockers	Barani Jayapal	Premgi Amaren, Meenakshi Dixit, VTV Ganesh	Jaswanth Super Cinemas	
D E C	31	Thanne Vandi	Manika Vidya	Umapathy Ramaiah, Samskruthy Shenoy	Shri Saravana Film Arts	
D E C	31	Theerpugal Virkapadum	Dheran	Sathyaraj, Smruthi Venkat, Harish Uthaman	HoneyBee Creations	
D E C	31	Velan	Kavin	Mugen Rao, Soori, Meenakshi Govindharajan	Skyman Films International	

== Awards ==
Category/organization	Filmfare Awards South 9 October 2022	SIIMA Awards 11 September 2022	Ananda Vikatan Cinema Awards 30 March 2023
Best Film	Jai Bhim	Sarpatta Parambarai	Jai Bhim
Best Director	Sudha Kongara; Soorarai Pottru (2020)	Lokesh Kanagaraj; Master	T. J. Gnanavel; Jai Bhim
Best Actor	Suriya; Soorarai Pottru (2020)	Sivakarthikeyan / Silambarasan; Doctor / Maanaadu	Suriya; Soorarai Pottru (2020) / Jai Bhim
Best Actress	Lijomol Jose; Jai Bhim	Kangana Ranaut; Thalaivii	Lijomol Jose; Jai Bhim
Best Music Director	G. V. Prakash Kumar; Soorarai Pottru (2020)	Santhosh Narayanan; Karnan	Anirudh Ravichander; Doctor / Master
