= Stephen Devassy =

Indian musician (born 1981)

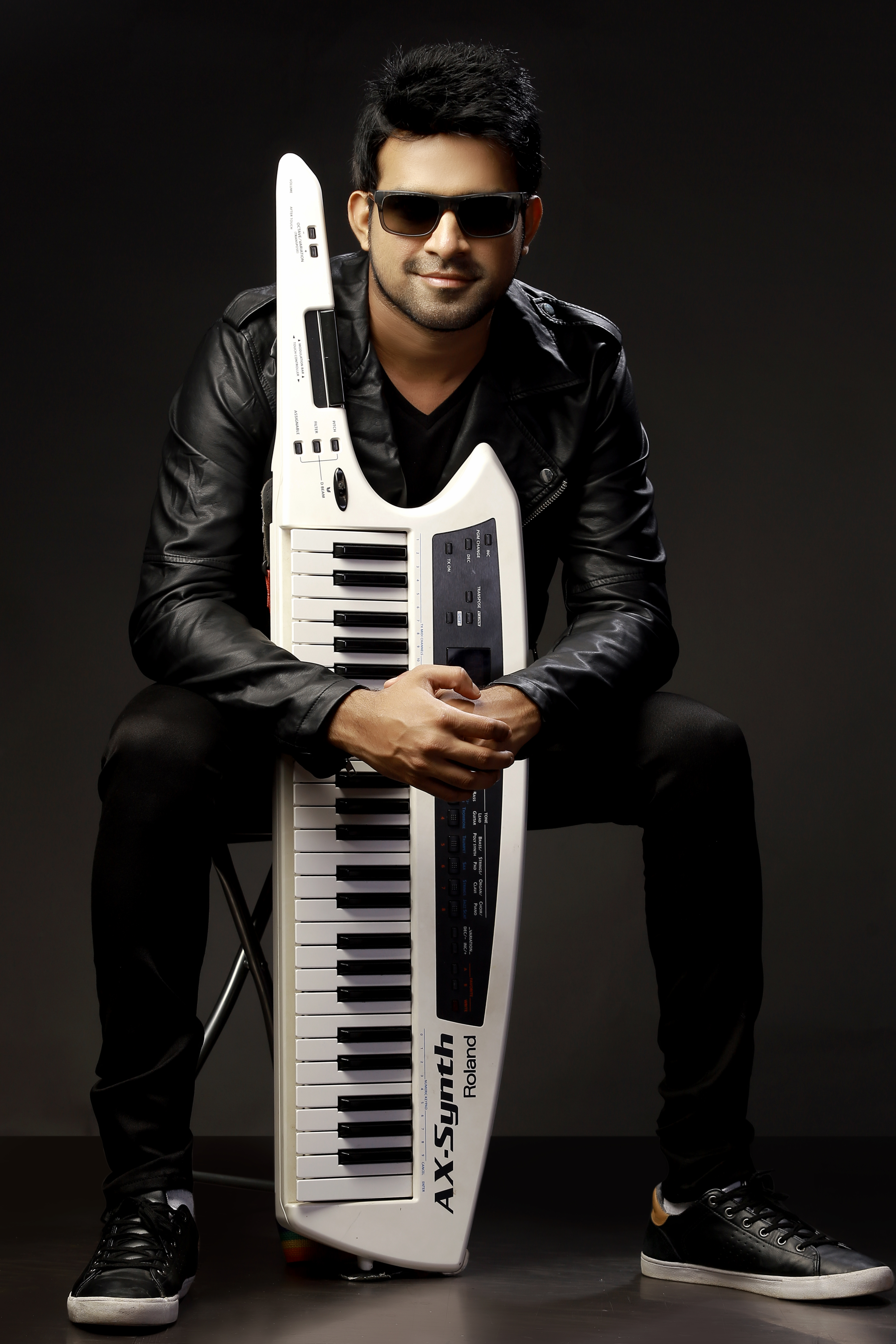
- Stephen Devassy

Background information
- Born: 23 February 1981 (age 45); Ottapalam, Kerala, India
- Occupations: Pianist; Keytarist; Keyboardist; Composer; Arranger; Music Director
- Years active: 1998–present
- Musical career
- Genres: rap rock; electronic rock; dance rock; Classical rock; folk rock
- Member of: Solid Band; Rexband; The Yes Triangle; Seven
- Website: stephendevassy.com

Stephen Devassy (born 23 February 1981) is an Indian musician hailing from Palakkad, Kerala. He started his career at a very early age, and has performed on stage around the world. Stephen is the founder of Musik Lounge, an audio technology school and studio in Chennai.

== Early life ==
Stephen did his schooling at Seventh Day Adventist school, Ottapalam. He went on to NSS College, Ottapalam for pursuing his Pre-Degree.And Stephen married Jesna Joy on 16 November 2010.

== Career ==
Stephen Devassy's first major break came when he was aged 18, through Johny Sagarika, for whom he did the music orchestration of six songs on the album Ishtamannu. He then went as an accompanying artist to play the keyboard for Hariharan on his European tour. He has also accompanied the violin maestro L. Subramanian at the Lakshminarayana Global Music Festival.

At age 19, he started a music band called Seven, with singer Franco Simon and guitarist Sangeeth Pavithran. An Indian pop band, they released an album titled YehZindagani

Stephen, who started performing at a young age, has done the music arrangement for many films. Some of the films he scored were Majaa, Thambi, Nammal, Azhagiya Thamizh Magan, Hariharan's album, Waqt Par Bolna and so on.

Hariharan Pillai Happy Aanu (2003) was his debut music directorial venture in Malayalam. Lyrics were written by famous young lyricst Rajeev Alunkal. The film "KQ" (2013) by Baiju Johnson, a story of two hard working friends also had a touch of Stephen's music. He also composed the music for Neerali, the survival thriller film released in 2018 and three songs for the 2023 neo-noir action thriller Pakalum Paathiravum. In 2024, he composed a song for the Malayalam legal drama Gumasthan.

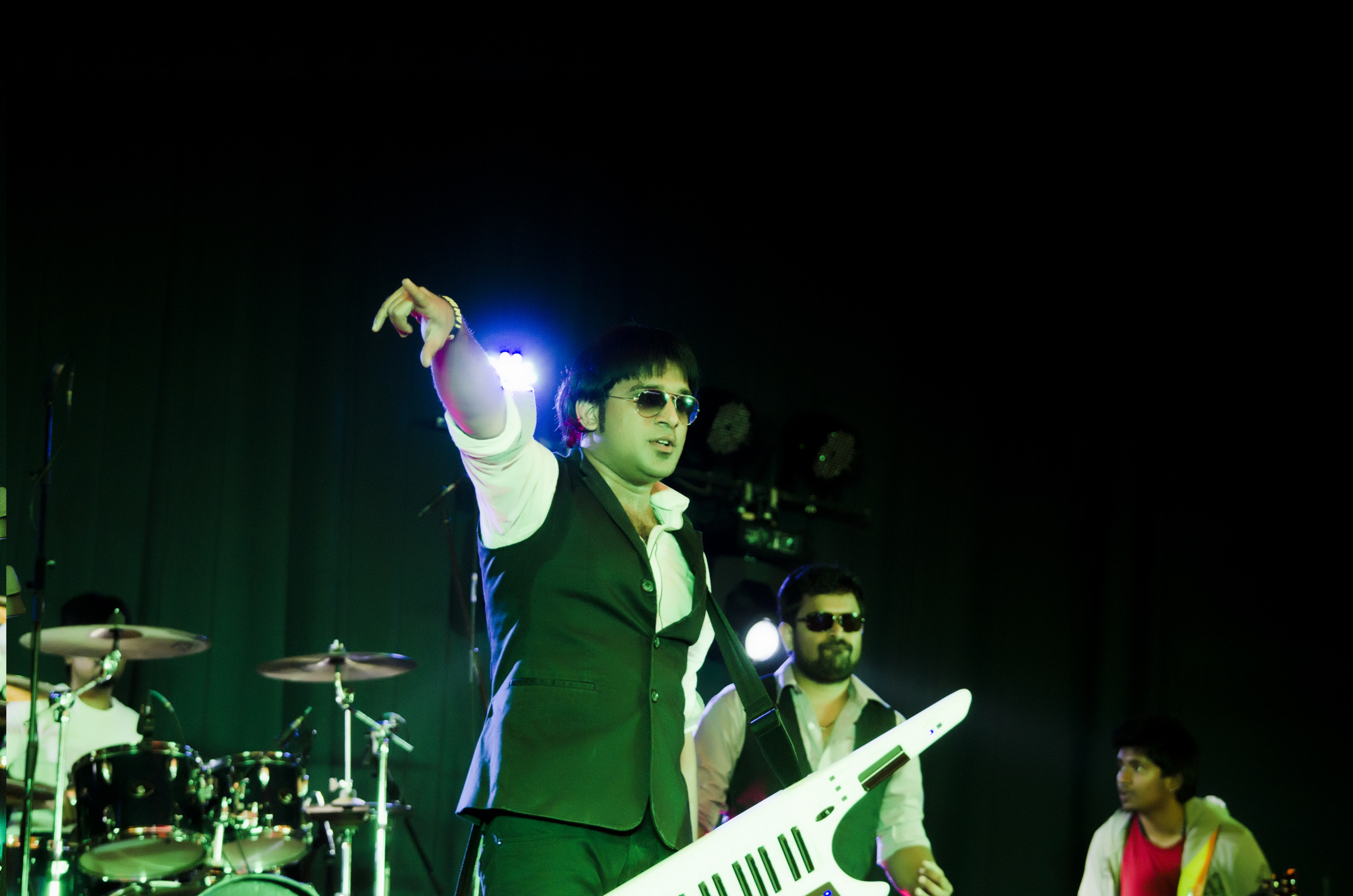
Stephen Devassy on stage

He is one of the regular band members in Rexband, a Christian contemporary band singing gospel fusion, a musical outreach of the Jesus Youth Movement. He performed with the band before Pope John Paul II during World Youth Day performance in 2002 at Canada. At the time, it was the only catholic band invited from India. Stephen has orchestrated an instrumental version of the popular Rexband melodies called Different Vibes.

In association with Kosmic Music, Stephen has also set to tune to a background of Western music, Sanskrit slokas, mantras and verses from the Upanishads, called Sacred Chants of Kosmic Music, and albums of holy chants on Ganesha, Shiva and Vishnu.

He has released his album Romanza, which was a mix of world music sprinkled with the flavor of piano. Indian ragas have been treated with the rich use of contemporary piano. Hariharan, Ouseppachan and a Russian vocalist appeared as guest artists on the album.

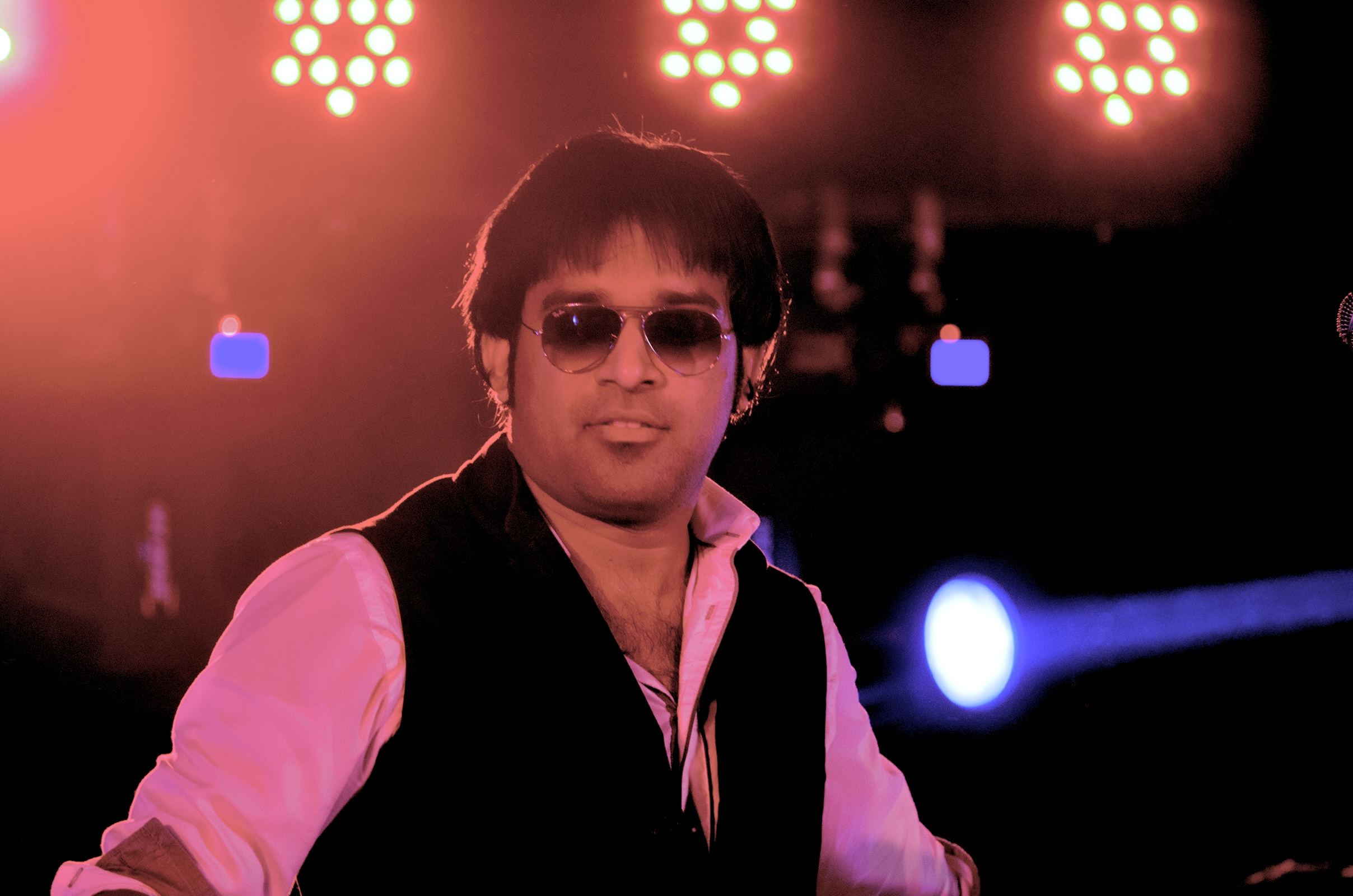
Stephen Devassy performing

Stephen's solo stage shows have propelled him to the top league of onstage performers.

Stephen did the role of an ideal judge in Amrita TV show Superstar Junior (2016), Top Singer (2018-2019) of Flowers channel and Star Singer on Asianet.

== Achievements ==
Featured on 5Talents Magazine Cover Page With His Life Story – 2013

The Icon of Inspiration Music – Behindwoods Gold Mic Award – 2019

== Discography ==
Year	Title	Director	Actors	Language
2003	Hariharan Pillai Happy Aanu	Viswanathan Vaduthala	Mohanlal, Jyothirmayi	Malayalam
2010	KQ	Baiju Johnson	Parvathy Omanakuttan, Baiju Johnson	Malayalam
2010	College Days (Background score only)	Jiyen Krishnakumar	Indrajith, Biju Menon	Malayalam
2018	Neerali	Ajoy Varma	Mohanlal, Suraj Venjaramoodu, Nadhiya	Malayalam
2023	Pakalum Paathiravum	Ajai Vasudev	Kunchacko Boban, Rajisha Vijayan, Guru Somasundaram	Malayalam
2024	Gumasthan	Amal K Joby	Bibin George, Dileesh Pothan	Malayalam
2025	Kannappa	Mukesh Kumar Singh	Vishnu Manchu, Mohan Babu, R. Sarathkumar, Madhoo, Mohanlal, Prabhas	Telugu
2025	Aghosham †	Amal K. Joby	Narain, Vijayaraghavan, Dhyan Sreenivasan, Aju Varghese	Malayalam

== Television ==
Programme Name	Year	TV Channel	Language	Notes
Super Star Season 1	2006	Amrita T V	Malayalam	Guest/Arranger/Judge/Performer
Super Singer Season 1	2008	STAR Vijay	Tamil	Guest
Top Singer	2018–2019	Flowers	Malayalam	Judge
Indian Idol Season 12	2020–2021	Sony TV	Hindi	Guest
Star Singer	2021–2023	Asianet	Malayalam	Judge
Super Singer Season 8	2021	STAR Vijay	Tamil	Guest
Super Singer Junior 8	2022	STAR Vijay	Tamil	Guest
