= Renu Soundar =

Indian actress

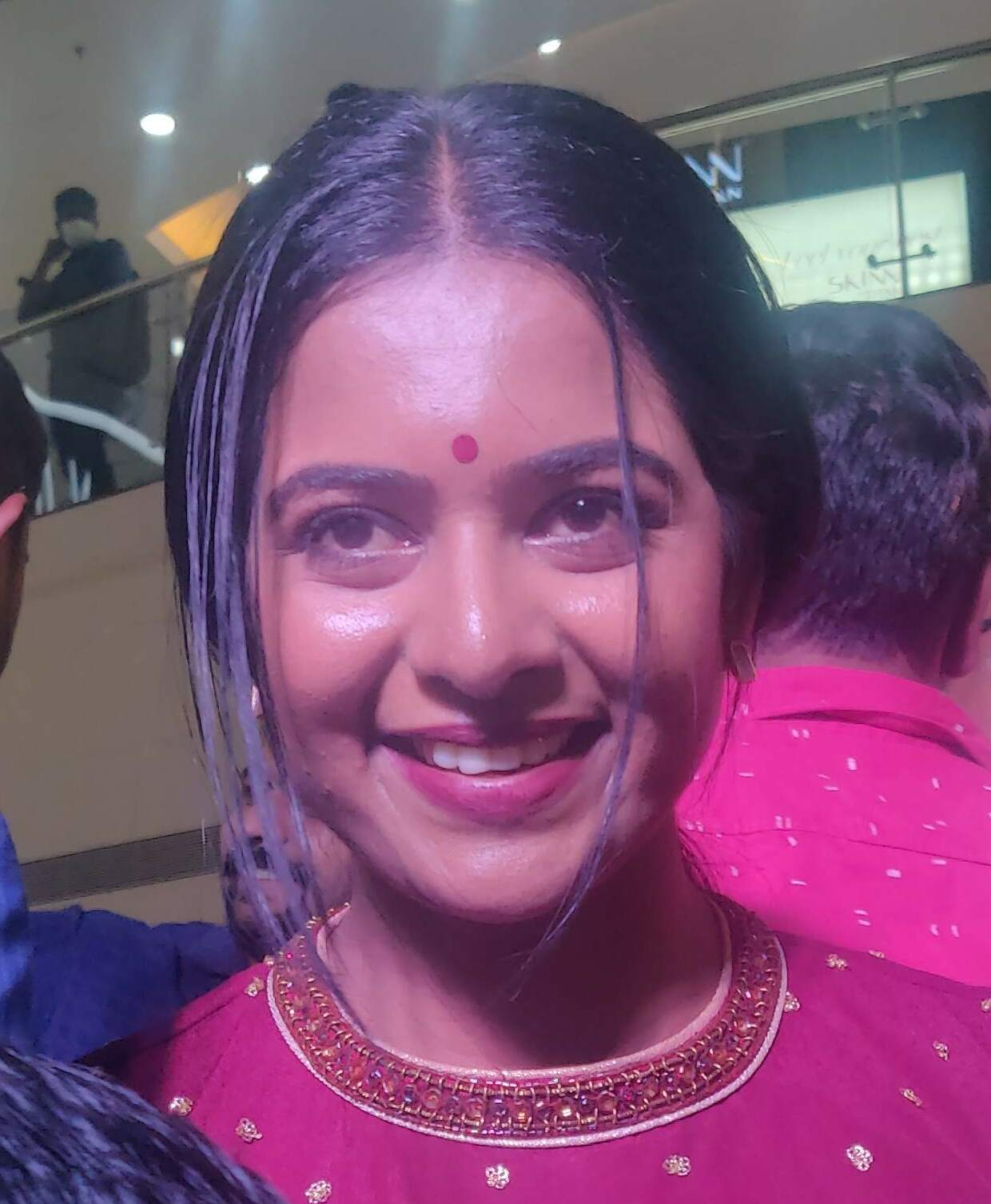
- Born: 13 October 1992 (age 34); Thiruvananthapuram, Kerala, India
- Education: Sree Sankaracharya University of Sanskrit
- Occupation: Actor
- Years active: 2011–present

Renu Soundar (born 13 October 1992) is an Indian actress who appears in Malayalam films and television series. She made her debut in the Malayalam film Manhole (2016). Her notable works include Chalakkudikkaran Changathi (2018), Ottam (2019) and Marjara – Oru Kalluvacha Nuna (2020)

== Early life ==
She studied at GHSS, Thiruvananthapuram and later moved to Kochi for completing her higher studies. Renu has a bachelor's degree in the fine arts and master of fine arts from Sree Sankaracharya University of Sanskrit.

== Career ==
Renu made her acting debut as the lead in the 2016 film Manhole directed by Vidhu Vincent. Manhole was also screened at the Indian Film Festival of Melbourne in 2017.

In 2018, Renu starred in the film Chalakkudikkaran Changathi along with Senthil Krishna, Honey Rose, Joju George and others. The film was a loosely based on the life of actor Kalabhavan Mani. In 2019, she had two releases, Ottam and Pengalila. Renu starred in the film Marjara – Oru kalluvacha Nunnu which released in 2020. Renu has done a film in Tamil, Manja Satta Pacha Satta (2021) along with Guru Somasundaram which is under production.

== Filmography ==
Key
†	Denotes films that have not yet been released

- All films are in Malayalam language unless otherwise noted.

Year	Title	Role	Notes
2011	Kerchief		Short film
2012	Kakkakuyil	Singer	Short film
2015	Aaram Kalpana	Georgi's wife	Short film
2016	Manhole	Shalini	Debut
2016	Kazhinja Kalam		
2017	Athazhaneram		Short film
2018	Chalakkudikkaran Changathi	Meenutti	
2018	Mutalaq	Amina	
2019	Ottam	Mariya	
2019	Pengalila	Anitha	
2020	Marjara – Oru kalluvacha Nunnu	Ahalya	
2020	Oppam	Daughter	Short film
2021	Manja Satta Pacha Satta		Tamil film
2022	Jack N' Jill	Shalini	
2022	Pathonpatham Noottandu	Neeli	
2024	Pattapakal		

== Television Serials ==
Year	Serial	Role	Language	Channel	Notes
2013	Ullkadal		Malayalam	Kairali TV	
2015-2017	Karuthamuthu	Karthika / Karthu / Paaru	Malayalam	Asianet	
2017–2018	Rekka Katti Parakkudhu Manasu	Valli	Tamil	Zee Tamil	
2017	Sathyam Shivam Sundaram	Gouri	Malayalam	Amrita TV	
