= Divya S. Menon =

Indian singer, anchor (born 1987)

Divya S Menon
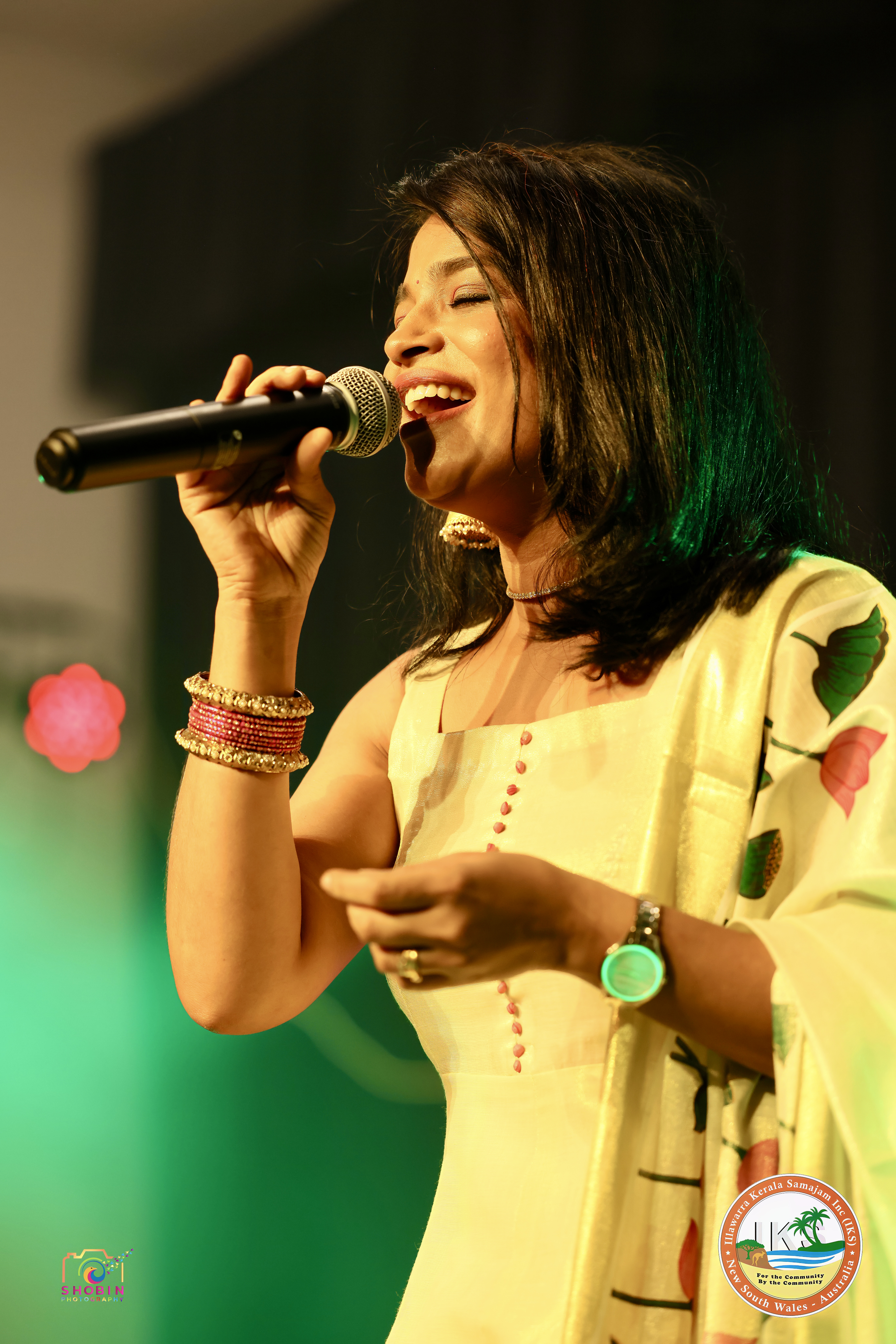

Background information
- Born: Divya S Menon; 14 March 1987 (age 39); Thrissur, Kerala, India
- Genres: Playback singing, Folk, Indian classical, Malayalam
- Occupations: Singer; television anchor
- Years active: 2005–present
- Website: www.divyasmenon.com

Divya S. Menon (born 14 March 1987) is an Indian musician and television anchor from Kerala. Divya is a playback singer in Malayalam cinema, who has also recorded songs for Tamil and Telugu films. Divya started anchoring musical shows in Asianet Cable Vision (Thrissur) and has done musical shows in Yes Indiavision (Mementos) and Kairali Channels (Ganamela, Sing 'N' Win and Rain drops).

== Personal life ==
Divya was born in Thrissur, Kerala, to Soman Kurup, a mechanical engineer and his wife Meena Soman. She was introduced to the world of music as a child and started singing at an early age of seven. Divya's father was on a transferable job and hence she attended schools including Kendriya Vidyalaya and Bhavans Vidhya Mandir across India. She graduated with a bachelor's degree in Commerce from Sree Kerala Varma College, Thrissur and went on to pursue her master's degree in Fashion Designing from St. Teresa's College, Ernakulam. She is married to Reghu Mohan on 20 August 2012 and is currently residing at Thrippunithura, Kochi, Kerala. The couple has a baby girl born on 31 October 2014.

== Career ==
Divya was trained in Carnatic Music from the age of 12 years by Smt. Shakunthala Sheshadri, Mr. Sunil and Sri. Mangad Nadessan.Divya also received education in Hindustani Classical music from Ustad Fiyaz Khan and Sri Dinesh Devdas. She is also passionate about jewellery making and has conducted several exhibitions under her jewellery brand named "Jingles".

Divya S Menon started her film career by singing for the 2009 film Ee Pattanathil Bhootham. She was noticed by Shaan Rahman while anchoring music shows and picked her for Vineeth Sreenivasan – Shaan Rahman debut album, Coffee @ MG Road. She is associated with Blogswara and have sung in multiple albums in the series. Divya has sung in Vineeth Sreenivasan's super hit romantic movie, Thattathin Marayathu composed by Shaan Rahman. She has been associated with Vineeth – Shaan ventures, including Malarvadi Arts Club. In 2014 the hit wedding song "Thudakkham Maangalyam" from Anjali Menon's Bangalore Days gave her much popularity which she sang along with Vijay Yesudas and Sachin Warrier composed by Gopi Sunder. In 2015 Divya was noticed more promptly when she sang the song "Puthumazhayai" from Martin Prakkat's Charlie composed by Gopi Sundar while the same song was sung by Shreya Ghoshal too. She also sang several ad jingles for various music composers both in Malayalam and Tamil.

== Discography ==
Year	Title	Film	Language	Composer	Notes
2010	"Adipoli Bhootham"	Ee Pattanathil Bhootham	Malayalam	Shaan Rahman	
2010	"Ayiram Kaatham"	Malarvaadi Arts Club	Malayalam	Shaan Rahman	
2012	"Anuraagam Anuraagam"	Thattathin Marayathu	Malayalam	Shaan Rahman	
2013	"Ennodu Koode"	Immanuel	Malayalam	Afzal Yusuf	
2014	"Rasool Allah"	Salalah Mobiles	Malayalam	Gopi Sunder	
2014	"Mannil Pathiyum"	God's Own Country	Malayalam	Gopi Sunder	
2014	"Thudakkam Maangalyam"	Bangalore Days	Malayalam	Gopi Sunder	Won - NAFA Award, KVTV Award, Vanitha Film Awards
2014	"Pattum Chutti Veli Pennu"	RajadhiRaja	Malayalam	Karthik Raja	
2015	"Mutholam Azagilu"	Namasthe Bali	Malayalam	Gopi Sunder	
2015	"Choolamittu"	Ivan Maryadaraman	Malayalam	Gopi Sunder	
2015	"Ummarathee"	Ivan Maryadaraman	Malayalam	Gopi Sunder	
2015	"Manjiloode"	100 Days of Love	Malayalam	Govind Menon	
2015	"Murugappaa"	Jamna Pyari	Malayalam	Gopi Sunder	
2015	"Muthe Mohabathin"	Nikkah	Malayalam	Gopi Sunder	
2015	"Puthumazhayai"	Charlie	Malayalam	Gopi Sunder	Won NAFA Award, Won KVTV Award
2016	"Ee Pulariyil"	Maalgudi Days	Malayalam	Dr Praveen	
2016	"Okko Nakshatram"	Seethamma Andalu Ramayya Sitralu	Telugu	Gopi Sunder	
2016	"Paravasame"	Seethamma Andalu Ramayya Sitralu	Telugu	Gopi Sunder	
2016	"Thodakkam Maangalyam"	Bangalore Naatkal	Tamil	Gopi Sunder	
2016	"Adada Adada"	Ennul Aayiram	Tamil	Gopi Sunder	
2016	"Vaarthinkalee"	Kali	Malayalam	Gopi Sunder	Won - Janmabhumi Awards, Nominated - 64th Filmfare Awards South, SIIMA
2016	"Chithira Muthe"	Shajahanum Pareekuttiyum	Malayalam	Gopi Sunder	
2016	"Mayathe Ennum"	Dooram	Malayalam	Mohammed Rizwan	
2016	"Neela Shankhu Pushpame"	Team 5	Malayalam	Gopi Sunder	
2017	"Mohabathin"	Take Off	Malayalam	Gopi Sunder	
2017	"Chekkanum Pennum"	Chunkzz	Malayalam	Gopi Sunder	
2017	"Ithu Nava Sumasara"	Chunkzz	Malayalam	Gopi Sunder	
2017	"Nenje Nenje"	Kadam Kadha	Malayalam	Deepankuran Kaithapram	
2017	"Nee Njangada"	Udaharanam Sujatha	Malayalam	Gopi Sunder	
2017	"Pennale"	Udaharanam Sujatha	Malayalam	Gopi Sunder	
2017	"Anthike Varikente"	Vimaanam	Malayalam	Gopi Sunder	
2017	"Meghakanavinu"	Vimaanam	Malayalam	Gopi Sunder	
2018	"Njano Ravo"	Kammara Sambhavam	Malayalam	Gopi Sunder	Nominated - Movie Streets Film Awards, RED FM Malayalam Music Awards
2018	"Aazhikkulil"	Kammara Sambhavam	Malayalam	Gopi Sunder	
2018	"Aaarovarunora"	Mazhayathu	Malayalam	Gopi Sunder	
2018	"First Time"	Pantham	Telugu	Gopi Sunder	
2018	"Neeyam Sooryan"	Kamuki	Malayalam	Gopi Sunder	
2019	"Konji Konji"	Irupathiyonnaam Noottaandu	Malayalam	Gopi Sunder	
2019	"Inkem Inkem"	Geetha Govindam	Telugu	Gopi Sunder	Introductory/Backing Vocals with Ajay Satyan
2019	"Repa Kuda Veyanival"	Evvarikee Cheppoddu	Telugu	Sankar Sharma	
2019	"Kandille Kandille"	Madhura Raja	Malayalam	Gopi Sunder	
2019	"Shaadi Mein Aana"	Happy Sardar	Malayalam	Gopi Sunder	
2019	"Pandithu Pande"	Happy Sardar	Malayalam	Gopi Sunder	
2019	"Pon Tharame"	Helen	Malayalam	Shaan Rahman	Won - QMH Analysis Awards
2020	"Manikya Kiliye"	Shylock	Malayalam	Gopi Sunder	
2020	"Manikya Kiliye"	Kuberan	Tamil	Gopi Sunder	
2020	"Raletti"	World Famous Lover	Telugu	Gopi Sunder	
2020	"My Love"	World Famous Lover	Malayalam	Gopi Sunder	
2020	"Kaneerilaliyunna"	World Famous Lover	Malayalam	Gopi Sunder	
2020	"Jannanathi Poovale"	Joshua	Malayalam	Gopi Sunder	
2020	"Noorukanavukal"	Joshua	Malayalam	Gopi Sunder	
2020	"Jaalame"	Trance	Malayalam	Jackson Vijayan	
2020	Thee Vitharunna	Silence Nishabdham	Malayalam	Gopi Sunder	
2021	"Nirayunnu"	Gila	Malayalam	Manukrishna	
2023	"Akashathalla"	Kunjamminis Hospital	Malayalam	Ranjin Raj	
2024	Yedhaki Oka Gaayam	Kushi (2023 film)	Telugu	Hesham Abdul Wahab	
2024	Vijanam oru Theeram	Kushi (2023 film)	Malayalam	Hesham Abdul Wahab	
2024	Sreematha	Kallanum Bhagavathiyum	Malayalam	Ranjin Raj	
2024	Odiyamma	Hi Nanna	Malayalam	Hesham Abdul Wahab	
2024	Shoopara da	Grrr	Malayalam	Tony Tarz	

== Awards ==
Year	Award	Film	Category	Nominated Song	Result
2015	KVTV Awards	Bangalore Days	Best Playback Singer Female	"Thudakkham Mangalyam"	Won
2015	NAFA Awards	Bangalore Days	Best Playback Singer Female	"Thudakkham Mangalyam"	Won
2015	Vanitha Film Awards	Bangalore Days	Popular Song of the Year	"Thudakkham Mangalyam"	Won
2015	Mirchi Music Awards South	Bangalore Days	Popular Song of the Year	"Thudakkham Mangalyam"	Won
2016	KVTV Awards	Charlie	Best Playback Singer Female	"Puthumazhayayi"	Won
2016	NAFA Awards	Charlie	Best Playback Singer Female	"Puthumazhayayi"	Won
2016	Janmabhumi Awards	Kali	Best Playback Singer Female	"Vaarthinkalee"	Won
2016	64th Filmfare Awards South	Kali	Filmfare Award for Best Female Playback Singer – Malayalam	"Vaarthinkalee"	Nominated
2016	SIIMA	Kali	SIIMA Award for Best Female Playback Singer – Malayalam	"Vaarthinkalee"	Nominated
2016	Mirchi Music Awards South	Kali	Best Playback Singer Female	"Vaarthinkalee"	Nominated
2017	Movie Streets Film Awards	Kammara Sambhavam	Best Playback Singer Female	"Njano Ravo"	Nominated
2017	RED FM Malayalam Music Awards	Kammara Sambhavam	Best Duet	"Njano Ravo"	Nominated
2019	QMH Analysis Awards	Helen	Best Playback Singer Female	"Helen"	Won

== Albums ==
Year	Album	Song	Music	Co-singer
2008	Coffee@ MG Road	Poonkuyile Poonkuyile	Shaan Rahman	Vineeth Sreenivasan
2008	Coffee@ MG Road	College	Shaan Rahman	Vineeth Sreenivasan, Shaan Rahman
2012	Dews of Love	Minnal Swapname	Anup Bhat	Govind
2013	Pepper Band	Nathooonne	Vishnu Mohan	Vishnu Mohan
2015	Vizhiyil	Nee Yen Munnil Vannu	Akshayjith	Sachin Warrier
