= IKK =

IKK may refer to:

- IκB kinase, an enzyme
- Greater Kankakee Airport
- Ikk (film), a 2021 Indian film
- nickname of MTR SP1900 EMU
