= Bhavan's Vidya Mandir =

Bhavan's Vidya Mandir may refer to the following schools of the Bharatiya Vidya Bhavan in Kerala, India:

- Bhavan's Vidya Mandir, Girinagar, in Cochin
- Bhavan's Vidya Mandir, Poochatty, in Thrissur

== See also ==
- Bhavan's Tripura Vidya Mandir, in Agartala, Tripura
- Bhavan's Gangabux Kanoria Vidyamandir, in Bidhannagar, West Bengal
