= Hariharan Pilla Happy Aanu =

- VCD cover
- Directed by: Vishwanathan
- Screenplay by: Sunil Impress; P. S. Kumar
- Story by: Sunil Impress
- Produced by: Johny Sagariga
- Starring: Mohanlal; Jyothirmayi
- Cinematography: Anandakuttan
- Edited by: L. Bhoominathan
- Music by: Stephen Devassy
- Production company: Dickle Cinemas
- Release date: 27 November 2003
- Country: India
- Language: Malayalam

Hariharan Pilla Happy Aanu (transl. Hariharan Pillai is happy) is a 2003 Indian Malayalam-language comedy film directed by Vishwanathan (in his directorial debut). starring Mohanlal and Jyothirmayi. This was the first film Stephen Devassy as composer.

== Plot ==
Hariharan Pillai runs a construction company with his uncle Velappan. He constructs a house for the rich money lender Dhanapaalan, who does not compensate him after completing the house. Sathyapalan's daughter Kavya initially dislikes Hariharan Pillai. However, she eventually falls in love with him. Hari also has to take care of his sister Latha who is in love with Nikhil. How Hariharan Pillai sorts out all of this issues and gets Kavya form the rest of the story.

== Cast ==
- Mohanlal as Hariharan Pillai
- Jyothirmayi as Kavya
- C. I. Paul as Satyapalan
- Vijayaraghavan as Dileep
- Cochin Haneefa as Velappan
- Jagathy Sreekumar as Mason Vasu alias Anjilithekkethil Vasudevan Namboothiri
- Salim Kumar as Sundaran
- Jagadish as Sub-Inspector Vinod Kumar
- Kaviyoor Ponnamma as Padmavathi Amma, Hariharan's mother
- Ambili Devi as Latha, Hariharan's sister
- Siddique as Hariharan's friend
- Ponnamma Babu as Ramani
- T. P. Madhavan as Rozario
- Nikhil as Sethu
- Saju Kuttanadu as Abu
- T.S Raju
- Priyanka as Mythili
- Deepika Mohan as Rozario's wife
- Machan Varghese
- Uma Nair as Kavya's friend

== Production ==
The bike with unusual wheels that was featured in C.I.D. Moosa (2003) was featured in this film.

== Soundtrack ==
The music was composed by debutante Stephen Devassy, who took a sabbatical after working on this film. Newcomer Rajeev Alunkal wrote all the lyrics. Alunkal recalled in a 2015 interview that it was risky for a newcomer to pen all the lyrics and how the producer of the film, Johnny Sagarika, took that risk.

No.	Title	Singer(s)	Length
1.	"Thingal Nilaavil"	P. Jayachandran, Sujatha Mohan	5:13
2.	"Munthirvaave"	K. J. Yesudas	4:25
3.	"Ambaadippoove Nillu Nillu"	K. S. Chithra	4:40
4.	"Thallu Thallu"	M. G. Sreekumar	3:40
5.	"Pularikal Chirakaniyum"	Jimmy Kalabhavan	4:40
6.	"Mundhiri Vaave"	Unni Menon

== Release and reception ==
The film released shortly after Mohanlal's box office success Balettan (2003) and Jyothirmayi's Anyar (2003). The film released in November 2003 coinciding with Ramadan. Abhijath of The Hindu opined that "The film begins well, while in the second half, it loses tempo". A critic from Sify wrote that "There is not even one redeeming factor in this technically slipshod enterprise. At the end contrary to the title, you leave the theatre whining and totally unhappy!" To prevent piracy, the film was released in 50 centres. Sagarika dropped his shelved project Chakram with Mohanlal and Dileep after the film's failure. Mohanlal went on to play a similar role in Vamanapuram Bus Route (2004), which was almost removed from theatres due to the box office failure of this film.
