= Gumasthan =

- Theatrical release poster
- Directed by: Amal K. Joby
- Written by: Riyaz Ismat
- Produced by: Muzafir Abdulla
- Starring: Bibin George; Dileesh Pothan; Jaise Jose; Aathira Rajeev; Rony David Raj
- Cinematography: Kunjunni S. Kumar
- Edited by: Ayoob Khan
- Music by: Stephen Devassy
- Production company: Muzafir Film Company
- Release date: 27 September 2024
- Country: India
- Language: Malayalam

Gumasthan (transl. Clerk) is a is 2024 Indian Malayalam-language thriller film directed by Amal K. Joby. The film stars Jaise Jose as the main protagonist.

== Premise ==
The cunning clerk, who knows every loop hole in law and court, is rumored to have killed his wife. But when the public and police come to know about the murder, they try to prove him guilty. But for that they have to bypass his intelligence. The story revolves around the hidden mysteries of the clerk and his house.

== Cast ==
- Bibin George as Aby
- Dileesh Pothan as Adv. Thomas Kuruvilla
- Jaise Jose as Andrews Pallipadan
- Aathira Rajeev as Maria
- Rony David Raj as CI Hameed
- Azees Nedumangad as Surendran
- Prasanth Alexander as Producer Sandeep
- Sminu Sijo as Leela
- Shaju Sreedhar as ASI Sivaraman
- Kailash as Peter Joby
- I. M. Vijayan as Bhadran
- Maqbool Salmaan as Ravi
- Bindu Sanjeev as Annamma
- Nandu Poduval as Priest
- Nibin Navas as Doctor

== Production ==
The project was announced in June 2023 and the filming reportedly began on 24 October 2023, with locations including Ettumanoor, Kidangoor, and Palakkad. As of 14 December 2023, the first schedule of filming had been completed. However, production was temporarily halted due to an on-set accident. The incident occurred during the filming of a bike chase sequence in Palakkad, where another biker collided with Bibin George's bike, resulting in the other biker being hospitalized, while George sustained minor injuries.

== Soundtrack ==
The songs were composed by Binoy S. Prasad, and Stephen Devassy.

Track listing
No.	Title	Lyrics	Music	Singer(s)	Length
1.	"Kankalaal Pesuthukku Title song"	Binoy S. Prasad	Binoy S. Prasad	Binoy S. Prasad	2:53
2.	"Gaanam Neeye"	B. K. Harinarayanan	Stephen Devassy	Murali Krishna	4:40
Total length:					7:33

== Release ==
The film was released theatrically on 27 September 2024.

=== Home media ===
The digital streaming rights were acquired by Amazon Prime Video, and the film began streaming on the platform from 8 November 2024.

== Reception ==
Arunima Krishnan of Manorama News gave the film a positive review. Similar to Manorama News, Pushpa M of Mathrubhumi also gave it a positive review. Nelki Naresh Kumar of Hindustan Times Telugu found the flashback of the film to be routine and considered the film as a simple revenge drama.
