= Bayamariya Brammai =

2024 film directed by Rahul Kabali

- Theatrical release poster
- Directed by: Rahul Kabali
- Written by: Rahul Kabali
- Produced by: Jagadish; Rahul Kabali
- Starring: JD; Guru Somasundaram; Harish Uthaman; John Vijay
- Cinematography: Nandha; Praveen V
- Edited by: Akhil Prakash
- Production company: 69 MM Films
- Release date: 21 June 2024 (India)
- Country: India
- Language: Tamil

Bayamariya Brammai (transl. Fearless delusion) is a 2024 Indian Tamil-language crime thriller film written and directed by Rahul Kabali. The film stars JD, Guru Somasundaram, Harish Uthaman, John Vijay in lead roles. The film was produced by Jagadish and Rahul Kabali under the banner of 69 MM Films. The cinematography was done by Nandha and Praveen V and the editing was handled by Akhil Prakash.

== Cast ==
- JD as Jagadish
- Guru Somasundaram as Jagadish
- Harish Uthaman as Jagadish
- John Vijay as Maran
- Sai Priyanka Ruth as Jagadish
- Vinod Sagar as Kabilan
- Kabali Vishwanth

== Release ==
Bayamariya Brammai was theatrically released on 21 June 2024.

== Reception ==
Roopa Radhakrishnan of The Times of India rated this film 2.5 stars out of 5 stars and noted "All said and done, this is a film that doesn’t enthral but surely manages to pique your interest." Manigandan KR of Times Now rated this film 2 stars out of 5 stars and noted "Bayamariya Brammai is a distinctly different film that leaves you exhausted by the time it ends."

Narayani M of Cinema Express rated this film 2 stars out of 5 stars and noted "The final impression that Bayamariya Brammai provides, is as ambiguous as the title itself—like a delusion that never ceases to provide meaning to life or the events of the everyday world but a delusion nonetheless."
