= Shylock (2020 film) =

2020 film by Ajay Vasudev

- Theatrical release poster
- Directed by: Ajai Vasudev
- Written by: Aneesh Hameed; Bibin Mohan
- Produced by: Joby George Thadathil
- Starring: Mammootty; Rajkiran; Meena; Siddique; Kalabhavan Shajon
- Cinematography: Renadive
- Edited by: Riyas K. Badhar
- Music by: Gopi Sundar
- Production company: Goodwill Entertainments
- Distributed by: Goodwill Entertainments; Red Sun Art Creations
- Release date: 23 January 2020
- Running time: 130 minutes
- Country: India
- Language: Malayalam
- Box office: ₹50 crore

Shylock is a 2020 Indian Malayalam-language masala film directed by Ajay Vasudev, written by Aneesh Hameed-Bibin Mohan and produced by Joby George Thadathil under Goodwill Entertainments. The film stars Mammootty in titular role, alongside and Rajkiran (in his Malayalam debut), Meena, Siddique, Kalabhavan Shajon, Baiju Santhosh, Bibin George and Hareesh Kanaran in supporting roles. The film's title is a slang term for a loan shark. The music was composed by Gopi Sundar, while cinematography and editing were handled by Renadive and Riyas K. Badhar.

Shylock was released on 23 January 2020. The film received mixed reviews, became a commercial success at the box office.

== Plot ==
Boss alias Shylock, a ruthless loan shark, provides money to a film producer Prathapa Varma to produce a film. However, Prathapan cheats Boss by not repaying the money, which enrages him. Prathapan is a close friend of a corrupt Police Commissioner Felix John. Boss creates a ruckus on Prathapan's film sets and abduct the film director due to which Prathapan sends men to kill Boss. Boss defeats everyone, including Felix's son Joel and mocks Prathapan and Felix. Felix charges a fake case that Prathapan's son Adithyan has gone missing and Boss is behind this. The police arrests Boss, but a video evidence proves that Adithyan is celebrating Holi in Nagpur with Felix's daughter Jewel.

Felix is forced to release Boss. On the way home, Prathapan confronts Boss and demands to know Adithyan's whereabouts. Boss reveals that after the video was telecasted, Boss kidnapped and killed Adithyan by using Prathapan's car claiming it as an accident. During Adityan's funeral, Felix and Prathapan suspect that Boss was part of a plot that they did before. Boss receives a call, where he rushes to home only to see an old man is awaken from coma. When Boss's associates ask him, Boss reveals that the old man is his brother Ayyanar and he narrates his past.

3 years ago: Boss used to live with his rich family. Boss's adopted brother Velumurugan is in love with Poonkuzhali. Poonkuzhali's family declined their relationship due to caste differences. Boss and Ayyanar fights Poonkuzhali's elder brother Rangan and his henchman and convinces Poonkuzhali to marry Velumurugan. Rangan is angered by this and teams up with Felix and Prathapan to exact revenge on Boss and his family. Boss leaves for Chennai for a few days. During this time, a producer asks Ayyanar for money. Ayyanar agrees, but on the condition that Boss, who aspires to be an actor, should act in the film. Rangan, Rangan's brother, Felix, Prathapan and their henchmen arrive at Ayyanar's house and kill the producer and tries to kill Ayyanar, but Ayyanar fights their henchmen.

Rangan kills Ayyanar's wife Lakshmi and Ayyanar kills Rangan. Rangan's brother realizes that Felix and his men were cheating him and Rangan, where he gets killed by Felix. Adithyan and his henchman kill all the family members, except Ayyanar who is stabbed by Felix. Assuming Ayyanar to be dead, Felix and Prathapan leave. Boss returns that night, only to find his family members dead. Boss finds that Ayyanar is still alive and takes him to a hospital. The doctor says that, after a surgery, Ayyanar will be crippled for life.

Present: Felix and Prathapan also learn about Boss's past. Boss kidnaps Prathapan's and Felix's friend Chacko and Joel. They find Chacko heavily drunk, tied to a chair and Joel dead. Chacko provokes Felix by telling that Boss will kill everyone and they can't do anything. An enraged Felix kills Chacko. Boss calls him and challenges Prathapan and Felix for a final confrontation in his old house. They both agree to the challenge and reaches the venue, where Boss overpowers their henchman and subdues Felix. Ayyanar stabs Felix to death, while Boss kills Prathapan. With nobody else to trouble him, Boss takes care of Ayyanar and continues his business as Shylock along with Balakrishna Panicker and Ganapathy.

== Cast ==
- Mammootty as Boss "Vaalu"/ Devan
- Rajkiran as Ayyanar
- Meena as Lakshmi Ayyanar
- Bibin George as Velmurugan
- Siddique as Commissioner Felix John IPS
- Kalabhavan Shajon as Prathapa Varma
- Baiju Santhosh as Balakrishna Panicker
- Hareesh Kanaran as Ganapathi
- Arjun Nandhakumar as Ram
- Ameenul Irfan as Raheem
- Arthana Binu as Poonkuzhali Velmurugan
- John Vijay as Rangan
- Ajai Vasudev as Thotta Raja
- Rafi as Chacko
- John Kaippallil as Adithya Varma
- Vinu Chemmalakuzhy as Joel Felix
- Jaise Jose as Isaac
- Udayakrishna as himself
- P. R. Rajasekharan as a builder
- Ambika Mohan as Meenakshi Ammal
- Prasanth Alexander as "Broker" Kumar
- G. Marimuthu as Chithappa (transl. Uncle)
- Rajalakshmi as Chinnamma (transl. Aunt)
- Jayaprakash as a doctor
- Santhosh Keezhattoor as Cinema Secretary
- Jewel as Tejal
- Jai Vishnu as a news reporter
- Binu Adimali as Saji, film production controller
- Laya as Felix's wife
- Joel Jo George as Chitappa's son

=== Cameo appearance ===
- Hareesh Peradi as Menon
- Ramya Krishnan as Neelambari (archive footage in "Kanne Kanne Veesathe")

== Production ==
Principal photography of the film began on 9 August 2019. Mammootty joined the sets a week after the shoot started. The film marks the debut of actor Rajkiran in the Malayalam cinema. Rajkiran and Meena, who had earlier worked in Pasamulla Pandiyare, are acting together after 23 years. Bibin George was chosen for an important role. The art direction of the film was handled by Girish Menon.

== Music ==
Shylock

Soundtrack album by Gopi Sundar
- Released: 18 January 2020
- Recorded: 2019–20
- Genre: Film soundtrack
- Length: 11:26
- Languages: Malayalam; Tamil
- Label: Goodwill Entertainments

The music was composed by Gopi Sundar. The soundtrack was launched on 18 January 2020.

No.	Title	Lyrics	Singer(s)	Length
1.	"Aaray Pirakave"	Raj Kiran	Deepika V, Keshav Vinod	3:38
2.	"Kanne Kanne Veesathe"	Viveka	Swetha Ashok, Narayani Gopan, Nanda J Devan	3:25
3.	"Manikya Kiliye"	Raj Kiran, Harinarayanan	Sachin Raj, Allwyn Eby George, Divya S. Menon, Shaheershah	4:23
Total length:				11:26

== Release ==
The film was scheduled for release on 23 January 2020 along with a Tamil dubbed version titled Kuberan, which was distributed by Rajkiran's Red Sun Art Creations. The film was dubbed in Telugu, Hindi and Kannada and released with the same title. The film's Tamil version, along with a Telugu dub, was released on Aha.

== Reception ==
=== Critical response ===
Shylock received mixed reviews from critics.

Sajin Shrijith of The New Indian Express gave 3.5/5 stars and wrote "Shylock is an exuberant celebration of Mammootty, the star, that attempts to milk his charisma to the fullest". Anjana George of The Times of India gave 3/5 stars and wrote "For the fans of 'mega star Mammootty', Shylock is a treat and for the followers of actor Mammootty, this is a complete 'no'."

Cris from The News Minute wrote "Yet another Mammootty 'mass' movie that numbs the mind. It is running out of boring descriptions for itself". Manoj Kumar R. of The Indian Express gave 1/5 stars and wrote "You know this story. You know how things would pan out. And you know what happens to the bad guys even before the film arrives at its depressingly predictable climax".

Anna M. M. Vetticad of Firstpost wrote that "To compensate perhaps for the absolute lack of novelty in the script, camerawork and all else here, multiple references are made to other films and their Tamil superstars.

=== Box office ===
The film received mixed reviews, but was a commercial success, and collected ₹12 crore (US$1.2 million) in its first weekend. The film collected ₹22 crore (US$2.3 million) within 5 days of its release.It completed 400 special shows in 4 days and first ever 4000 housefull shows in mollywood. Shylock may earn up to ₹5 crore (US$520,000) in India on its first day. The film has collected ₹9 crore (US$930,000) worldwide, ₹3 crore (US$310,000) overseas on its first day. The film earned ₹3.5 crore (US$360,000) in the Kerala state. The film was opened well on the first day and got an immense occupancy at Kochi, Thiruvananthapuram. Critics claimed that the first half is purely fans stuff and also complained about the routine story but still, Mammotty fans are enjoying the film as the film is entertaining. Kerala box office collection is ₹39.71 crore (US$4.1 million), overseas box office collection ₹27.53 crore (US$2.9 million) and Tamil dubbed version gross is ₹2.93 crore (US$300,000) The film collected over ₹70.17 crore (US$7.3 million) at the worldwide box office against a budget of ₹12 crore (US$1.2 million), and is among the highest-grossing Malayalam films of all time.
