= RajadhiRaja =

2014 film directed by Ajai Vasudev

Rajadhi Raja
- Promotional poster
- Directed by: Ajai Vasudev
- Written by: Udayakrishna; Siby K. Thomas
- Produced by: M. K. Nasser; Stanly Silvester Consera
- Starring: Mammootty; Raza Murad; Mukesh Khanna; Joy Mathew; Siddique; Joju George; Raai Laxmi; Sijoy Varghese
- Cinematography: Shaji Kumar
- Edited by: Mahesh Narayanan
- Music by: Score: Gopi Sunder; Songs: Karthik Raja; Berny-Ignatius
- Production company: Good Line Productions
- Release date: 5 September 2014
- Country: India
- Language: Malayalam

Rajadhi Raja (transl. King of Kings) is a 2014 Malayalam-language action thriller film directed by Ajai Vasudev, written by Udayakrishna-Siby K. Thomas and produced by Good Line Productions. The film stars Mammootty, alongside Joy Mathew, Siddique, Joju George, Raai Laxmi, Mukesh Khanna, Raza Murad, Sijoy Varghese, Rahul Dev and Nawab Shah. The cinematography and editing were handled by Shaji Kumar and Mahesh Narayanan. The soundtrack was composed by Karthik Raja and Berny-Ignatius, while the musical score was composed by Gopi Sunder.

RajadhiRaja was released on 5 September 2014 to mixed reviews from critics and became commercially successful at the box office.

== Plot ==
In Chittur, Ayyappan is a petty thief who visits his relative Shekarankutty, a gas station owner, leading a happy family life with his wife Radha and his daughter Sreedurga. One day, Shekarankutty is arrested by the police on suspicion of him being a crime boss called Raja in Mumbai, but is released as the police could not confirm that he was the suspect. That following night, Shekarankutty and his family are attacked by a group of gangsters whom Ayyappan had a fight once. The next day they shift their house. As Shekarankutty and Ayyappan go to meet the police commissioner, they are followed by the same gang that attacked them. As they are rounded up, Ayyappan tries to flee, but stops when seeing Shekarankutty beating up them, thus revealing his identity as Raja. After the fight, Shekarankutty reveals to Ayyappan about his past.

Past: Shekarankutty arrives at Mumbai with an ambition to become a businessperson, but instead got a job as a cab driver where he met Krishna Vamshi, an underworld don and kingpin who offered a life in the Indian underworld to gain money and fame. Shekarankutty kills Radha's brother Chandru, who was one of Vamshi's men in an attempt of saving District Collector Mahindra Varma's daughter who was kidnapped. Varma was his old friend who changed him and gave a new life. Radha and her family was unaware that Shekarankutty killed Chandru.

Present: Shekarankutty is threatened by Vamshi, that his family will be killed, but he manages to save his family in the nick of time. Later, Shekarankutty is sent by his former boss to kill Varma who is the Chief Secretary in Coimbatore on the occasion of Varma's daughter's wedding. As Shekarankutty is indebted to Varma for the help he had done in the past, Shekarankutty can never kill Varma, but Vamshi and his associates are adamant on killing Varma, where they threaten to kill Shekarankutty's family unless Mahindra Varma is brought to them.

Mahindra Varma tells that he too loves his family like Shekarankutty, where Shekarankutty brings Mahindra Varma to Ahmed Shah. Shekarankutty reveals that he killed Vamshi before arriving at the place with the help of his friend Sikandar, whose family was killed by Vamshi in a bomb blast. Shah and his men tries to kill the Varma, but Shekarankutty overpowers and kills them. Later, Shekarankutty manages to hide his past and lives a happy life with his family.

== Cast ==
- Mammootty as Rajashekharankutty (Raja)
- Siddique as Chief Secretary Mahendra Varma IAS
- Joju George as Ayyappan
- Joy Mathew as Ahmed Shah, the main antagonist
- Raai Laxmi as Radha, Shekharankutty's wife
- Raza Murad as Krishna Vamshi
- Mukesh Khanna as Sikhander
- Nawab Shah as Sathya
- Rahul Dev as John Tiger
- Sijoy Varghese as Chandru, Radha's brother
- Babu Namboothiri as Gangadhara Menon, Shekarankutty's father
- Lena as Vidyalakshmi, Varma's wife
- Bheeman Raghu as DYSP Paulose Pothen
- Abu Salim as Sandeep, a security officer
- Kazan Khan as Khalid
- Ravi Prakash as Mumbai Commissioner Devilal Patel IPS
- Assim Jamal as a gangster
- Taniya Stanley as Ammu, Varma's daughter
- Nelson as Kuttappan
- Shaju as Man fighting at Petrol pump
- Sethulakshmi as Paruttiyamma
- Baiju VK as CI George
- Baby Eva as Sreedurga, Shekarankutty's daughter
- Baby Karen Mejo as Mahendra Varma's little daughter
- Unni Mukundan as Mahendra Varma's son-in-law (cameo appearance in the song "Kanninu Kannin")
- Shamna Kasim as a dancer (cameo appearance in the song "Dhan Than" )

== Soundtrack ==
Two songs were composed by Karthik Raja and one song ("Midumidukkan") was composed by the duo Berny–Ignatius.

All lyrics are written by Hari Narayanan.

No.	Title	Music	Singer(s)	Length
1.	"Pattum Chutti"	Karthik Raja	Karthik, Najim Arshad, Sudeep Kumar, Sachin Warrier, Divya S. Menon, Sangeetha	4:10
2.	"Kham Kham"	Karthik Raja	Tippu, S. Surmugh, Sudeep Kumar, Yasin	5:26
3.	"Midumidukkan"	Berny–Ignatius	Madhu Balakrishnan, Rimi Tomy, Kumari Nandha J. Devan	3:57
Total length:				13:33

== Reception ==
=== Critical response ===
Deepa Soman of The Times of India gave 3.5/5 stars and wrote "Rajadhiraja is a winsome film with enough moments to entertain you this Onam season." Sify wrote "Rajadhi Raja is a mimicry of some tasteless masala flicks, which are seriously outdated. This one has perhaps been aimed at the hardcore fans of the superstar." IndiaGlitz gave 7/10 stars and wrote "In the final analysis, 'Rajadhiraja' doesn't offer any freshness in narratives, but it can be fine for a one-time watch if you are not in theatres with any big expectations." Paresh C Palicha of Rediff gave 2/5 stars and wrote "Rajadhi Raja proves to be a lacklustre Onam release"

== Box office ==
The film grossed close to ₹14 crore (US$1.5 million) in eight days from the Kerala box office.
