= Thuneri (film) =

- Theatrical release poster
- Directed by: Sunil Dixon
- Written by: Sunil Dixon
- Produced by: Sunil Dixon
- Starring: John Vijay; Nivin Karthik; Miya Sree
- Cinematography: Kalesh; Allan
- Music by: Kalaiarasan
- Production company: Shadow Light Entertainment
- Distributed by: Action Reaction Films
- Release date: 24 December 2021
- Running time: 116 mins
- Country: India
- Language: Tamil

Thuneri is a 2021 Indian Tamil-language horror drama film produced, written and directed by Sunil Dixon. John Vijay, Nivin Karthik and Miya Sree appear in the lead roles.

== Cast ==
- John Vijay as Karuppasamy
- Nivin Karthik as Inspector
- Miya Sree as Maya
- Maria Charm as Nila
- Krishna Kumar as Mandiravadi
- Santhosh as Vishva

== Release and reception ==
The film was released on 24 December 2021 across theatres in Tamil Nadu. A critic from Maalai Malar labelled the film as "scary". Newspaper Dina Thanthi also gave the film a positive review. A critic from News Today wrote that "Though a template horror film and there are cliches, yet Thuneri is watchable. Plenty of CG works too finds a place. Well begun is half done is what Thuneri is all about".

Critic Malini Mannath wrote "it could have turned into a watchable film for children, had the director focused on that aspect of it. Thuneri is a promising debut from a debutant maker". A reviewer from MyKollywood noted it was a "decent horror movie".
