= Agadu =

- Theatrical release poster
- Directed by: S. Suresh Kumar
- Produced by: Vidiyal Raju
- Starring: John Vijay; Siddharth Kumaran; Sriram Karthik; Anjali Nair
- Cinematography: Samrat
- Edited by: Thiyagu
- Music by: John Sivanesan
- Production company: Shoundaryan Pictures
- Release date: 22 October 2021
- Running time: 93 minutes
- Country: India
- Language: Tamil

Agadu is a 2021 Indian Tamil-language drama film written and directed by S. Suresh Kumar. John Vijay, Siddharth Kumaran and Sriram Karthik appear in the lead roles. Produced by Vidiyal Raju, it was released on 22 October 2021.

== Cast ==
- John Vijay
- Siddharth Kumaran
- Sriram Karthik
- Anjali Nair
- Vijay Anand

== Production ==
The film was shot within a month in Kodaikanal.

== Release and reception ==
The film was released on 22 October 2021 across theatres in Tamil Nadu. Maalai Malar's critic gave the film a positive review, citing it was "interesting". New Cinema Express gave the film a middling review, rating it 2.5 out of 5. A critic from News Today wrote "Agadu joins the list of crime thrillers in Tamil cinema that is engaging in part", while a reviewer from Chennaivision noted "overall, the movie keeps the audience engaged".
