= Pakalum Paathiravum =

2023 Malayalam film

- Theatrical release poster
- Directed by: Ajai Vasudev
- Screenplay by: Nishad Koya (Dialogues)
- Story by: Dhayal Padmanabhan
- Produced by: Gokulam Gopalan
- Starring: Kunchacko Boban; Rajisha Vijayan; Guru Somasundaram
- Cinematography: Faiz Siddik
- Edited by: Riyas K. Badhar
- Music by: Stephen Devassy (songs); Sam C. S. (bgm)
- Production company: Sree Gokulam Movies
- Release date: 3 March 2023
- Running time: 121 minutes
- Country: India
- Language: Malayalam

Pakalum Paathiravum is a 2023 Indian Malayalam-language action thriller film directed by Ajai Vasudev, starring Kunchacko Boban, Rajisha Vijayan and Guru Somasundaram in lead roles. The film is a remake of the 2018 Kannada film Aa Karaala Ratri. The film had its theatrical release on 3 March 2023. Subsequently, it was made available to stream on ZEE5 on 28 April 2023.

== Synopsis ==
Pakalum Paathiravum is the story of Michael, a wildlife photographer, who starts his journey from Kochi to Mysore with a hidden intent. The movie discusses the uptight moments that happen when he passes through the Maoist-occupied inlands of Wayanad.

== Cast ==
- Kunchacko Boban as Michael Vareeth
- Rajisha Vijayan as Mercy Vareeth
- Guru Somasundaram as CI Janakiraman
- Gokulam Gopalan as Father
- Seetha as Mariya Vareeth
- Manoj K U as Vareeth
- Divyadarshan
- Tamizh as Maniyan
- Ullas Panthalam
- Bibin George as Singer (cameo appearance)
- Poojapura Radhakrishnan
- Jays Jose

== Production ==
The film was announced on 5 December 2021 and the principal photography started the next day. The film was released on 3 March 2023. Director Ajai Vasudev, who has helmed three Mammootty starrers previously, announced his fourth film for Sree Gokulam Movies starring Kunchacko Boban and Rajisha Vijayan. Actor Guru Somasundaram, who played the antagonist in Minnal Murali was signed to play an important role. Sam C. S. was signed to compose the background score. Producer Gokulam Gopalan also played an important role.

== Reception ==
A citric from Times of india wrote that "Kunchacko Boban brings the star presence to the movie and gives a good 'man of mystery' feel" and gave 3 stars out of 5.

Sajin Shrijith critic of The New Indian Express noted that "In a movie headlined by Kunchacko Boban, I never expected to find Guru Somasundaram to be the only entertaining factor, albeit briefly".

S. R. Praveen critic of The Hindu wrote that "Outdated ideas in the screenplay and poor character writing ruin this thrilling story about greed and hopelessness".

Onmanorama critic stated that "The performances by all the actors are commendable."

IndianExpress.com critic gave a mixed review. The film was also criticized for the excessive use of slow motion shots.
