= Chalakkudikkaran Changathi =

2018 film by Vinayan

- Theatrical release poster
- Directed by: Vinayan
- Screenplay by: Ummer Muhammed
- Story by: Vinayan
- Produced by: Shaji Glastone
- Starring: Senthil Krishna; Honey Rose; Dharmajan Bolgatty; Salim Kumar
- Cinematography: Prakash Kutty
- Edited by: Abhilash Viswanath
- Music by: Bijibal; Satheesh Babu
- Production company: Alpha Film
- Release date: 28 September 2018
- Country: India
- Language: Malayalam

Chalakkudikkaran Changathi (transl. Friend from Chalakudy) is a 2018 Indian Malayalam-language drama film directed by Vinayan and written by Ummer Muhammed from a story by Vinayan. It stars Senthil Krishna, Honey Rose, Dharmajan Bolgatty, and Salim Kumar. The film was inspired by the life story of Kalabhavan Mani. Even after the death of Kalabhavan Mani, a CBI investigation probing his suspected murder questioned this film director as there were no proof for someone adding pesticides to the alcohol drunk by Mani before his death. This film's director was in real life the director portrayed as Hari in this film.

== Plot ==
The film is about the rise and fall of Rajamani, an autorickshaw driver from Chalakudy who made it big in Malayalam and Tamil cinema before he fell prey to his vices. Mani gets acting role in superstar rajkumar's film as an auto driver with a short dialogue. Mani is an auto driver also knows agriculture and talented acting skill. Mani gets supporting role in director Hari's film, and hari sees Mani getting disappointed on knowing his next film getting cancelled and also comes to know from Raja who is Mani's friend that his marriage with his girlfriend got rejected as he is low caste and poor. Hari gets surprised seeing Mani's blind person acting mimicry and tells his next film he will make a film with this character as main role. Mani with his friends and parents sees his guest appearance role in his first film that got released in a nearby theatre but gets disappointed seeing he is not shown well and his dialogue got more shortened so gets disappointed and gets fainted while this time Suku tells Mani gets fainted even if happy or sad. Later Mani's first film gets released with blind role that gets well appreciated from everyone and gets selected as national award winner and tells this to director Hari who tells don't believe until it is announced. Announcement comes as the national award winner is another Malayali actor, hearing this disappointed Mani again faints.

Now again Suku while taking Mani to hospital tells again Mani if happy or sad gets like this. Next film karumadi releases with same time superstar rajkumar's film big budget film also released. Karumadi become big hit. Mani become famous. Now Mani gets called by film association members who is behind blocking roles for thilothaman, a veteran actor who was against this association's foul games by blocking his acting chances, thilothaman tells one person amongst them as the most poisonous. This association warns Mani not to invite director Hari for his next film inauguration ceremony of film launch. Mani confesses his inability to stop the film association's foul play of keeping another actor to inaugurate the film launch ceremony instead of director Hari but he tells he keeps deep respect for the director. Mani is shown sitting in his out house excessive drinking with his friends. Inspector comes to arrest him and abuses him using his father's name badly for which Mani beats the inspector, this time TV news show adgp supporting Mani by telling this type of actors cannot be taken under custody for simple reasons. The inspector leaves the area, now Mani calls producer epachan and tells stop his foul games of trying to trap him in the forest case but epachan tries defending he was about to call minister for him but Mani gives him reply we all know your character and whatever director hari told is being proved as time proceeds. Mani is seen becoming a heavy drinker and starts vomiting blood gets admitted in hospital and doctor tells stop drinking. Friends take decision not to drink hereafter. One Chennai based producer comes and keeps four crore rupees and threaten to Mani that he filed case against them for stealing a big amount of money from him and he can deal the land case without even giving money, Mani tells back for the land sale ten crores paid they have got high profit so twenty five crore to be given back. Now after the Chennai producer leaves after keeping the four crore rupees bag on the desk, Mani tells Raja to keep this four crore rupees in his home as being black money police can come anytime and trap them as even the producer can cheat by informing police of this much money in possession by Mani and the money is purely black money. Zahir who is a close friend of Mani approach Mani and request to help him with four crore rupees in a land sale for which Mani agrees because the money he advances will not get back if the land deal is signed by somebody and also tells his one close friend is in enemy side in the real estate business.

Mani gets again hospitalized with blood vomiting and doctor tells even 200 ml alcohol is dangerous for life to Mani. Mani tells Raju to submit the four crore rupees to zahirs office so Raju goes his house but raju's father in law had already spent this money for a business man as high interest loan without raju's permission. Raju drinks heavily alcohol and next day his friends scold him and puts raju in water thus recovering raju from deep alcoholic state. They goes to Mani's house and sees Mani drunk and tells Mani doctor already told not to drink but Mani tells I feel energy today and should conduct a party and with this party he stops drinking alcohol permanently. Zahir also comes for party and sees Raju who tells Mani has turned away the money and zahir tells why Mani didn't tell him. Now a song showing how Mani behaves friendly with everyone is shown and how he cried at his father's death, also during the song zahir tried to ask Mani of the money but Raju comes and diverts Mani away, after this raja remember doctor tells two hundred ml alcohol is enough can end Mani's life and he takes a full glass of scotch and keeps it at the end of table where Mani is standing and Mani seeing the whisky bottle empty takes the glass of scotch that Raju kept and drinks. After this song ends with Mani again vomiting blood and the friends carry Mani in ambulance to reach hospital and while in the way Mani tells he knows only to love people but many people cheated him, raja hearing cries heavily. Mani dies inside the ambulance. Later TV news show reporter announcement as Mani is dead as the death of a great actor. Mani's previous girlfriend with his son is seen visit the graveyard of Mani and while leaving the area the small boy hears a someone singing and looks back sees Mani as half soul singing a song that was earlier made by Mani and the boy sings as a continuation of this song and the film ends.

== Cast ==
- Senthil Krishna as Raja Mani (based on Kalabhavan Mani)
  - Vishnu Purushan as Young Raja Mani
- Honey Rose as Actress Kavitha (based on Divya Unni)
- Sudheer Karamana as Director Hari
- Vishnu Govindan as Raju
- Renu Soundar as Meenutti
- Dharmajan Bolgatty as Suku
- Salim Kumar as Mani's father Ramappan
- Karthik Vishnu as Young Raja Mani
- Maneesha Jayasingh as Rajamani's wife
- Anil Murali as Moosa
- Guinness Pakru as Sheviliyar
- Joju George as Superstar
- Joy Mathew as Embran
- Tini Tom as Producer Vavachan
- Krishna as Mani's partner
- Kochu Preman as Cameraman
- Kottayam Nazeer as Foodie director
- Ponnamma Babu as Relative of actress
- Ramesh Pisharody as Manager of Rajkumar
- Chali Pala
- Sreejith Ravi as Father in law of Raju
- Sunil Sukhada as Class teacher of Mani
- Naseer Sankranthi as Makeup Man
- Gokulan as Kunju Raman
- Raja Sahib as Eppachan
- Shibu Thilakan as Thilothaman (Based on Thilakan)
- S. P. Sreekumar as Mani's manager Joseph
- Balaji Sarma
- Rajani Murali
- Saju Kodiyan as Abel Periyappuram

== Music ==
Bijibal and Satheesh Babu composed the film's music. The lyrics were written by B. K. Harinarayanan.

Chalakkudikkaran Changathi

Soundtrack album by Bijibal, Satheesh Babu
- Released: 2018
- Genre: Feature film soundtrack
- Length: 3:48
- Label: Millennium Audios

No.	Title	Singer(s)	Length
1.	"Chalakudi Chanthakkupokumbol"	R.L.V. Ramakrishnan	3:48

== Reception ==
Chalakkudikkaran Changathi was released in India on 28 September 2018.

The Times of India and Deccan Chronicle gave the film a rating of 3/5 and Mathrubhumi gave the film a rating of 2/5.
