= Ajai Vasudev =

Indian film director

- Occupation: Film director
- Years active: 2014–present

Ajai Vasudev is a film director active in the Malayalam film industry

== Film career ==
He made his directional movie debut through Rajadhi Raja, which released on 5 September 2014. His second film, again with Mammootty, was Masterpiece. He teamed up with him for the third time for Shylock. He previously worked as assistant director for more than 25 films before his directorial debut.

== Filmography ==
Year	Title	Credited as		Role	Notes	Ref.
Year	Title	Director	Actor	Role	Notes	Ref.
2014	RajadhiRaja	Yes				
2017	Masterpiece	Yes				
2020	Shylock	Yes	Yes	Thotta Raja		
2022	Malikappuram		Yes	Chettiyar		
2023	Pakalum Paathiravum	Yes				
2024	Mandakini		Yes	Manoj		
2024	Virunnu		Yes			
2024	Bad Boyz		Yes			
2024	Murivu		Yes	Master Raghuvaran		
2025	Kammattam		Yes		ZEE5 web series	
2026	Law and Order †		Yes	TBA		
