= Ottam =

2019 Malayalam film

- Directed by: Zam
- Written by: Rajesh Kumar Narayanan
- Produced by: Thomas Thiruvalla
- Starring: Nandu Anand; Roshan Ullas; Renu Soundar; Madhuri Dileep
- Narrated by: Lal Jose
- Cinematography: Pappu, Anishlal R.S
- Edited by: V.S Vishal
- Music by: John P Varkey
- Production company: Chithranjali Studio
- Distributed by: Thomas Thiruvalla films
- Release date: 8 March 2019
- Running time: 120 minutes
- Country: India
- Language: Malayalam

Ottam (transl. Race) is a 2019 Indian Malayalam-language film directed by Zam and scripted by Rajesh K Narayan. The film features debutants Nandu Anand and Roshan Ullas in lead roles along with Renu Soundar, Madhuri Dileep, Manikandan R. Achari, Alencier Ley Lopez, Kalabhavan Shajohn, Rohini, Sudheer Karamana, Thesni Khan and Rajesh Sharma.

== Plot ==
Set in Trivandrum, the story of Ottam unfolds in a day, and progresses through the lives of two youngsters - Abhi (Nandu Anand) and Vinay (Roshan Ullas). What does destiny have in store for these young men?

== Cast ==
- Nandu Anand as Abhi
- Roshan Ullas as Vinay
- Renu Soundar as Mariya
- Madhuri Dileep
- Manikandan R. Achari as Kattu
- Alencier Ley Lopez as Chachappan
- Kalabhavan Shajohn
- Rohini as Sara
- Sudheer Karamana
- Althaf
- Thesni Khan as Rejina
- Rajesh Sharma as Suni
