= John Vijay =

Indian actor

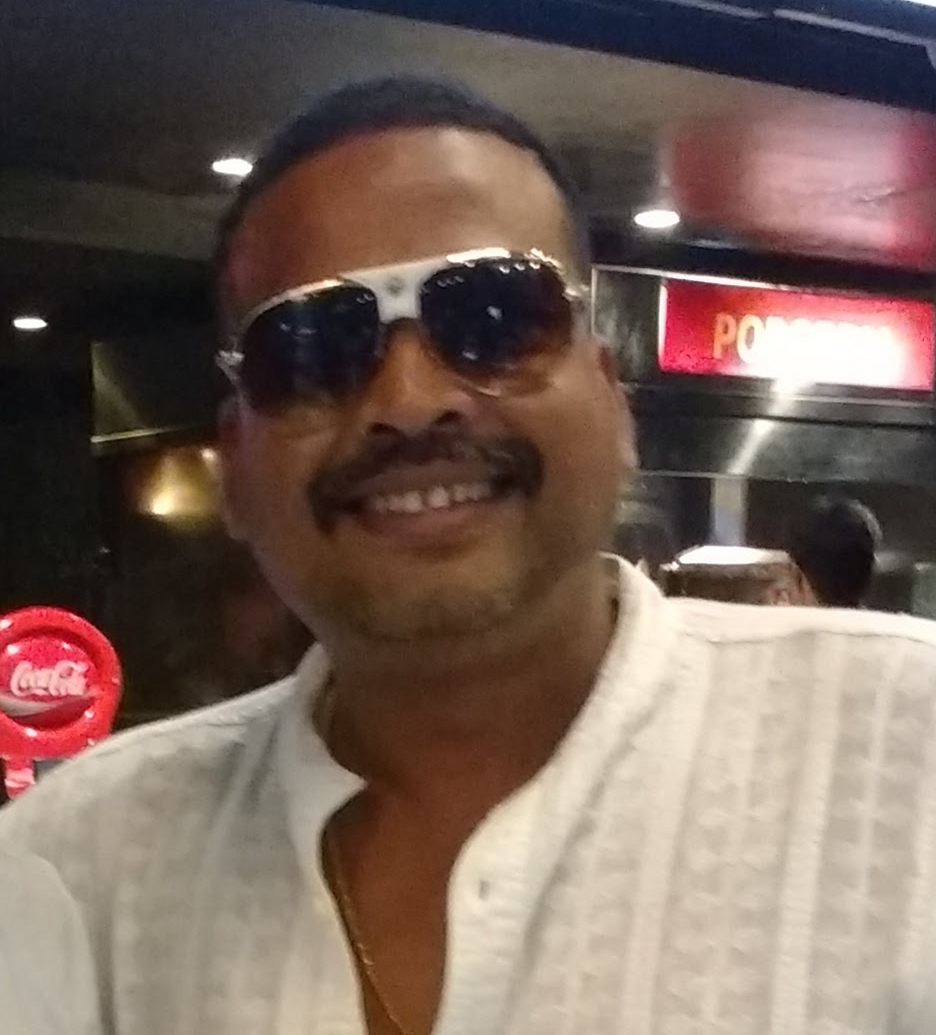
- John Vijay at LUXE cinemas, Chennai
- Born: 20 November 1976 (age 50); Tuticorin, Tamil Nadu, India
- Education: Loyola College, Chennai Caldwell Higher Secondary School, Tuticorin.
- Occupation: Actor
- Years active: 2006-present
- Spouse: Madhavi Elangovan
- Children: 1

John Vijay (born 20 November 1976) is an Indian actor who works in Tamil, Telugu, Malayalam, Hindi and Kannada films. He is well known for his performances in Oram Po (2007), Thillalangadi (2010), Mouna Guru (2011), Kalakalappu (2012) and Sarpatta Parambarai (2021).

== Career ==
John Vijay did his M.Sc. in Visual Communication from Loyola College, Chennai. Vijay also works as the head programme director of Radio One FM. John is the chief of 'H2O', an advertising agency with its office at Nungambakkam. He made his acting debut with the film Thalaimagan (2006).

Pushkar and Gayatri, who were his juniors in the Visual Communications course in Loyola College, offered him a role in their directorial debut Oram Po. His performance as "Sun of Gun" in the film was described by critics as "scene stealer, his antics bring the house down". His character in his debut film Oram Po was defined as a person who hails from Thoothukudi who had to come to Chennai and stay in Chennai on a permanent basis. He apparently learnt Madras Tamil for the film Oram Po.

John Vijay insisted that his fear of acting with big scale high-profile actors vanished after being cast by Mani Ratnam in Raavanan (2010). He played the role of a rogue police officer in Mouna Guru (2011) starring opposite Arulnithi and his performance was well received. He played a friend of Rajinikanth in Kabali (2016). John Vijay playing the role of an antagonist in Iravukku Aayiram Kangal (2018).

He has also trained a few emerging actresses to speak Tamil fluently by hosting a program titled Tamil Pesum Kadanayagi, and he insisted the reason to host such a program was to encourage Tamil actresses to bag national awards by speaking Tamil in a fluent manner.

He played with Mohanlal in Malayalam films such as Lucifer (2019) and Big Brother (2020). And later, he appeared in Telugu films such as Waltair Veerayya (2023), Bhagavanth Kesari (2023), Salaar: Part 1 – Ceasefire (2023) and Razakar (2024).

== Controversy ==
In October 2018, singer Sriranjani Sundaram accused John Vijay of sexual misconduct as part of MeToo allegations. It was during the middle of the night in 2014 that Sriranjani narrated a sequence of events about her receiving phone calls from Vijay, apparently accusing Vijay of phone sex, with the latter allegedly pursuing a conversation with Sriranjani, although Sriranjani had told him that she would call back the next day. The incident unfolded just a month after both attended a fun interview together.

== Filmography ==
†	Denotes films that have not yet been released

=== Tamil films ===
Year	Title	Role	Notes	Ref
2006	Thalaimagan			
2007	Oram Po	Pichchai (Son of Gun)		
2007	Billa	John		
2008	Poi Solla Porom	Johny		
2010	Raavanan	Hemanth Shankar		
2010	Angadi Theru	Director		
2010	Bale Pandiya	Pasupathy		
2010	Thillalangadi	'Manda Odu' Maasi		
2010	Va	King, Parattai Prince	Dual roles	
2011	Ko	Himself	Special appearance	
2011	Aanmai Thavarael	'Andhra' Prasad		
2011	Vanthaan Vendraan	Training coach		
2011	Mouna Guru	Marimuthu		
2012	Kalakalappu	Dharmarajan		
2012	Etho Seithai Ennai	Kumar		
2013	Samar	Manohar		
2013	David	Ranade Babu		
2013	Moondru Per Moondru Kaadhal	Elango		
2013	Neram	Kattai Kunju		
2013	Theeya Velai Seiyyanum Kumaru	Military Colonel		
2013	Pattathu Yaanai	Daya		
2013	Ainthu Ainthu Ainthu		Special appearance	
2013	Vidiyum Munn	Lankan		
2014	Vaayai Moodi Pesavum	Nuclear Star Boomesh		
2014	Thirudan Police	Maravattai		
2014	Vellaikaara Durai	Vatti Varadhan		
2015	Enakkul Oruvan	Lucia Drug Dealer		
2015	Rombha Nallavan Da Nee			
2015	Sakalakala Vallavan	ACP Duraisingam IPS		
2015	Thiru.Vi.Ka.Poonga			
2015	Dummy Tappasu			
2016	Azhagu Kutti Chellam	Callsheet Kumar		
2016	Peigal Jaakkirathai			
2016	Saagasam	'Chain' Jaipal		
2016	Ko 2	Police Commissioner Santhanapandian		
2016	Kabali	Ameer		
2016	Nambiar	Police Officer		
2016	Bayam Oru Payanam			
2016	Kadalai	Businessman		
2016	Veera Sivaji			
2017	Vaigai Express	SP Alexander		
2017	Enbathettu	Sakthi Saravanan		
2017	Kootathil Oruthan	Yogendran		
2017	Thappu Thanda	Guru		
2017	Thupparivaalan	Kamalesh		
2017	Solo	Shravan		
2017	12-12-1950	Himself		
2017	Ulkuthu	Shanmugam		
2018	Kaathadi	Karthavarayan		
2018	Iruttu Araiyil Murattu Kuththu	Swamy		
2018	Iravukku Aayiram Kangal	Vasanth		
2018	Semma Botha Aagathey	Sekar		
2018	Kadaikutty Singam	MLA		
2018	Vanjagar Ulagam	Maaran		
2018	Saamy 2	Devendra Pichai		
2018	Pattinapakkam	Samuthiram		
2018	Vandi	Inspector		
2019	Mr. Local	Lawyer Arjun Reddy		
2019	Zombie	Inspector Panner Selvam		
2019	Sangathamizhan	Criminal	Guest appearance	
2019	Thiravam		ZEE5 original web series	
2019	Irandam Ulagaporin Kadaisi Gundu	Arms dealer		
2019	50/50	Kulandhai	Also singer for "Bin Laden Ganguda"	
2021	Bhoomi	Ekambaram		
2021	Sarpatta Parambarai	Kevin aka Daddy		
2021	Agadu			
2021	4 Sorry	Stephen	Anthology film; fourth segment	
2021	Enemy	Peter		
2021	Thuneri	Karuppasamy		
2022	Anantham	Ramu	Web series	
2022	Take Diversion	JK		
2022	The Warriorr	SP Joshua		
2022	Kaatteri	Naina, Aarumugam		
2022	Cobra	Anand Subramaniam		
2022	Yugi	Guruprasad		
2023	Pichaikkaran 2	Ilango		
2023	Karungaapiyam	Kasi aka Annachi		
2023	Kolai	Mansoor Ali Khan		
2023	Partner	John Vijay		
2023	Thee Ivan	Minor		
2024	Singapore Saloon	Anoop Menon		
2024	Vadakkupatti Ramasamy	Mookaiyan		
2024	Vithaikkaaran	Inspector Dharmaraj		
2024	Por	Police Inspector	Bilingual film Simultaneously shot in Hindi titled Dange	
2024	Bayamariya Brammai			
2024	Jolly O Gymkhana	Inspector Idithangi		
2024	Nirangal Moondru	Director Kishore		
2024	Mayan	IPS officer		
2025	Leg Piece	Inspector Daas		
2025	Chennai City Gangsters	Damar Lal		
2025	Red Flower			
2025	Indian Penal Law	Special Squad Officer		
2025	Revolver Rita	Inspector Kamaraj		
2025	Mahasenha	Forest officer Prathap		
2025	Retta Thala	Inspector Thiraviyam		
2026	The Bed	Inspector		
2026	Vengeance	Madhav		
2026	Moondram Kan	General Manager Sadhasivam		
2026	Arulvaan	Pandian		
2026	G.D.N	M. R. Radha		
2026	Magudam	Jana		

=== Telugu films ===
Year	Title	Role	Notes
2016	Shankara	ACP Prasad	
2022	Bhamakalapam	Nayar	
2022	Ramarao on Duty	SP Devanand	
2022	The Warriorr	SP Joshua	
2022	Highway	Harasser	
2023	Waltair Veerayya	Abdullah	
2023	Bhagavanth Kesari	Ratan Shukla	
2023	Salaar: Part 1 – Ceasefire	Ranga	
2024	Razakar	Mir Laiq Ali	
2024	Tiragabadara Saami		
2024	Appudo Ippudo Eppudo	Badri Narayana	
2025	Shivangi Lioness	Monster K	
2025	Akkada Ammayi Ikkada Abbayi	Criminal	
2025	Gurram Paapi Reddy	Hayagreevam	
2026	Peddi	Ammathalli	

=== Malayalam films ===
Year	Title	Role	Notes
2012	Bachelor Party	Prakash Kamath	
2012	Madirasi	SP Devaram	
2014	Samsaaram Aarogyathinu Haanikaram	Nuclear Star Boomesh	Malayalam version of Vaayai Moodi Pesavum
2014	Iyobinte Pusthakam	Ganapathy Iyer	
2015	Adi Kapyare Kootamani	Adhishta Lakshmi's Father	
2017	Comrade In America	Arul Jebaraj Peter	
2017	Solo	Shravan	
2019	Lucifer	Commissioner Mayilvahanam IPS	
2020	Big Brother	Govind Raj	
2020	Shylock	Rangan	
2020	2 States	Police officer	
2022	Adrishayam	Guruprasad	
2024	Thankamani	DYSP Micheal Kuruvilla	
2025	Adinaasam Vellapokkam	Ganja Karuppu	

=== Hindi films ===
Year	Film	Role
2013	David	Ranade Bhai
2014	Dedh Ishqiya	Police Officer
2024	Dange	Police Inspector

=== Kannada films ===
Year	Film	Role
2010	Prithvi	Inspector Suryaprakash
2014	Gajakesari	Rana
