= 4 Sorry =

2021 Indian anthology film

- Release poster
- Directed by: S. Sakthivel
- Written by: S. Sakthivel
- Produced by: Senthil Prabu; S. Sakthivel; Jeganarayanan; Karthik Ashokan
- Starring: John Vijay; Kaali Venkat; Sakshi Agarwal
- Cinematography: Venkatesh Prasad
- Edited by: PK
- Music by: Prasanna Sivaraman
- Production companies: Safety Dream Production; Rule Breaker Production; Magic Lantern; Diya Cine Creations
- Release date: 29 October 2021
- Running time: 98 minutes
- Country: India
- Language: Tamil

4 Sorry is a 2021 Indian Tamil-language anthology film, consisting of four short film segments directed by S. Sakthivel. Featuring John Vijay, Kaali Venkat and Sakshi Agarwal in leading roles, the film was released on 29 October 2021.

== Cast ==
Segment 1	Segment 2	Segment 3	Segment 4
Daniel Annie Pope as Boss; R. N. R. Manohar	Sakshi Agarwal as Yamuna; Karthik Ashokan as Vivek	Kaali Venkat as Selvi's uncle; Riythvika as Selvi; Vettai Muthukumar	John Vijay as Stephen; Sahana Sheddy as Pooja

== Soundtrack ==
Soundtrack was composed by Prasanna Sivaraman.

- Aeriyil – Prasanna Sivaraman, Sushmitha Narasimhan
- Kanna Nee – Ramya Sivaramakrishnan, Vijay Nagaraja
- Sorry – Vignesh Raju

== Release ==
The film was released across Tamil Nadu on 29 October 2021. A critic from Maalai Malar gave the film a positive review, mentioning it was an "effort to be appreciated". Newspaper Thinaboomi also reviewed the film.
