= Rexband =

Rexband is the first Catholic band from the Indian subcontinent to be invited to the World Youth Day performance in 2002 at Toronto. From then, they have been consistently invited for the later World Youth days in 2005 at Cologne, in 2008 at Sydney and in the 2011 at Madrid. In the most recent 2013 held at Rio de Janeiro, the Rexband had the blessing of performing at the WYD main stage – right before the Holy Father's message at the night vigil.

Rexband was established in the late 1980s and early 1990s by a group of young musicians who experienced a life-changing encounter with Jesus through the Jesus Youth movement. It was during this period in Kerala, the southernmost state of India, that Catholic Charismatic Renewal started, prompting these young people to ask God how they could use their talent in music and theater to reach out to youth. The answer for them was Rexband, a musical outreach of Jesus Youth, which has today grown into a worldwide ministry of over 25 artists with a distinctive talent in music or theater. The signature sound of Rexband is a fusion of ethnic and contemporary elements. Rexband has released over 10 albums in different languages over the last decade.

== Albums ==
1. Roses In Winter - English
2. Quiet Waters - English
3. Different Vibes - Instrumental
4. Destination Christ - English
5. Son Rise - English
6. Jeevachaitanyam - Malayalam
7. You Turn - English
8. On My Knees -English
