= Jesus Youth =

Missionary movement at the service of the Church

Jesus Youth Logo / JY Logo

Jesus Youth (JY) is an International Catholic Movement, approved by the Holy See.

== Overview ==
The movement evolved from the Charismatic revival that spread from Kerala throughout India in the mid-1970s. In 1985, the International Year of Youth, a number of youth groups came together under a single name, Jesus Youth. Gradually, it spread to different parts of India and to a number of other countries. On 20 May 2016, it was granted recognition by the Vatican as an international private association of the faithful with juridical personality.

The movement follows a lifestyle modelled on the life of Jesus Christ, based on what it calls 'six pillars', namely, Prayer, Word of God, Sacramental Life, Fellowship, evangelization and Preferential option for the poor"

== History ==
JY had its beginnings in Kerala, India in 1976. On August 20, 2007, the Catholic Bishops’ Conference of India recognized JY as a national association of the faithful on October 29, 2008.

On 29 October 2008, JY received approval from the Catholic Bishops' Conference of India (CBCI) and Archbishop Abraham Viruthakulangara was appointed as the Ecclesiastical Advisor.

On 6 April 2016, JY was recognized as an ‘International Private Association of Christian Faithful of Pontifical Right’ with juridical personality in Canon Law by the Pontifical Council for the Laity.

JY is an international private association of the faithful of all states of life, with juridical personality, governed by the present statutes in conformity with canons 298 - 311 and 321 - 326 of the Catholic Code of Canon Law.

== The Six Pillars ==
JY is known for its spirituality that promotes an active Catholic lifestyle that is relevant to a young layperson facing the challenges of life. JY is based on Six "Pillars of Spirituality" including:

- Prayer
- Word of God - Reading and meditating the Holy Scripture.
- Sacramental Life - Frequent and active participation in the seven Sacraments, with emphasis on the Eucharist and Confession
- Fellowship
- Evangelization
- Option for the Poor

== Works ==
JY carries out the work of evangelization by fostering individual apostolates, facilitating group apostolates and engaging in formal missions and projects in various parts of the world.

JY ministries include Parish Ministry, Teens Ministry, Professionals Ministry, Nurses Ministry and Campus Ministry. The Backbone of all JY activities are Intercession ministry and Finance ministry.

JY has several groups and programmes for its members. These include;

- Cell groups, Small groups and Prayer encourage young people and families to come together regularly for prayer and fellowship.
- Service teams co-ordinates teams at different levels consist of a Co-ordinator, a Pastor, one or more Animator/s and members.
- Faith formation is for the personal growth of members, in addition to the regular fellowship groups, there is a wide range of formation programmes in the JY Movement - Jesus Youth Fulltime Volunteers, History Makers, Discipleship Training Programmes (DTP), Master Builders, Junior Evangelisers Training (JET).
- Formation for leaders and animators are offered at National and International Leaders’ Training and National and International Animators’ Training.
- Talent oriented formation include The Rex Band, Music Ministry, Audio visual Ministry, Media Ministry and Exhibition Ministry.
- Formation through reach out programmes include Outreach Ministry, Prolife Ministry, Cultural Exchange Programme (CEP), and Exposure programmes. JY also organises numerous mission experience trips by parish youth, professionals and others.
- Regional, national and inter-continental conferences, Campus Meet, Nurses’ Meet, Teens’ Meet, etc. These play a vital role in training youth to be active in their Christian life and witness.

== Ministries ==
JY ministries are founded on a spiritual basis. The formation teams work together to develop the ministry and engage in the apostolate, provide mutual support and promote spiritual growth.

A JY ministry is usually the initiative of an individual or a small fellowship, and normally tries to share Jesus in a particular context, using one's talent. These initiatives gradually grow into ministries of JY. While helping young people to come together and grow spiritually, these ministries also prepare them to evangelize to others. JY has a number of ministries focusing on different areas including: i) Formation, ii) The context of life, iii) Talent and iv) Outreach

JY ministries include:

- Theatre Ministry
- Media Ministry
- Campus Ministry
- Arts and Science College Ministry
- Teens Ministry
- Nurses Ministry
- Kids Ministry
- Doctors Ministry
- Prolife Ministry
- Professional Ministry
- Parish Ministry
- Intercession Ministry
- Outreach Ministry
- Medical Engineering Students Ministry
- Music Ministry
- Family Ministry
- Street Ministry

JY came to the UK in the 1990s with the arrival of many IT specialists and nurses from India. JY in the UK sees its mission as, advancing the Christian faith, relieving sickness and financial hardship, and advancing education.

=== Full time volunteers ===
JY Fulltimership is a year-long formation program for graduates with 40 days of training and one-year full-time missionary commitment to work in different parts of the world.

It started in 1991 when a Jesus Youth felt an inner call to commit life completely for one year to be a missionary with JY. He left his career for the service of the Lord. After consultation with the leaders and elders of the movement he launched himself into this new journey, visiting people and places and challenging young minds in campuses and parishes across Kerala.

=== The Rexband ===
The Rexband is part of JY’s musical outreach. The band has performed around the world over the last 25 years. It was the first band from India to be invited by the Pope to perform for the World Youth Day.

The band was formed in the late 1980s by a group of young musicians from diverse musical environments ranging from contemporary pop to ethnic Indian music. The name ‘Rexband’ comes from the Latin phrase 'Christus Rex’, meaning "Christ the King".

=== Publications ===
- Kairos (Monthly Magazine)
- Kairos Global (Monthly Magazine)
- Jesus Youth Newsletter (Quarterly Magazine)
- Rex Band (Music)
- Sing Halleluia
- Jesus Youth Prayers
- Philip and Paul, Emmaus I and II, Emmaus III and IV (Formation Materials)

== Membership ==
In 2023, JY is present in 35 countries.

There are 3 categories of membership in JY: Regular Members, Associate Members and Honorary Members.

Regular Members are Catholic faithful from all states of life: clergy, religious and laity, and include deacons, seminarians and religious celibates. They are those in the Committed, Confirmed and Covenant Phases of the formation.

Associate Members are those who desire to accompany the association, but are unable to fulfil the requirements of Regular membership (Art. 14). They undergo a period of formation before becoming Associate Members. They do not participate in the governing councils of the association. Catholics and non-Catholic Christians can become Associate Members.

Honorary Members are Catholic bishops who accompany and advise the association. The International Council, in consultation with the Ecclesiastical Advisor of the International Council, confirms the honorary membership. Honorary Members will be invitees to the International Assembly and their respective National Assemblies.

Non-Christians may become part of Jy prayer groups and attend the first two phases of formation, namely, Contact and Companion Phases, but cannot become members of the association.

== Organization ==
JY is organized on a geographical basis with areas governed by JY Councils. Local households are coordinated by the Zonal or Regional Council. Zonal Councils are coordinated by a Regional Council. The National Councils coordinate the Regional Councils. The National Councils are accountable to the International Council. The council is elected for a period of three years.

Each JY Region usually coincides with an Ecclesiastical Region (canon 433 (CIC)). The higher council demarcates and forms a Region considering the number of JY members in that area. A Regional Council governs the association in the Region and the National Council governs the association in the country. When the Ecclesiastical Region covers several countries, each country can have a National Council. The organs of governance of the association are personal and collegial. The personal ones are the Coordinator, Assistant Coordinator and Finance Coordinator. The collegial ones are the Councils, and the Assemblies. At each level the association is governed by the Council elected by the respective Assembly.

Coordinators of Jesus Youth International
Year	Coordinator
2022–Present	Midhun Paul
2018 - 2022	Shoy Thomas
2014 - 2018	C C Joseph
2011 - 2013	Raiju Varghese
2008 - 2010	George Devassy
2002 - 2008	Manoj Sunny

== Jesus Youth Logo ==
The J and Y in the Jesus Youth logo represent a young person and the risen Christ. The circle stands for the world where the youth are firmly rooted, receive graces and then pass them on.
