= Alpha Adimai =

- Promotional release poster
- Directed by: Jinovi
- Written by: Jinovi
- Starring: Vinod Varma; Arun Nagaraj; Kalki; Eshwar
- Cinematography: Manikandan Murthy
- Music by: Sathya-Jen
- Distributed by: SonyLIV
- Release date: 3 September 2021
- Country: India
- Language: Tamil

Alpha Adimai (transl. Alpha slave) is a 2021 Indian Tamil-language crime thriller film directed by Jinovi and starring Vinod Varma, Arun Nagaraj, Kalki, and Eshwar.

== Cast ==
- Eshwar as Ponnan
- Kalki as Mayilsamy
- Vinod Varma as Dheeraj
- Arun Nagaraj as Vicky
- Jinovi as Aaru
- Radhakrishnan as Durai
- Arun Martin as Ranjith
- Vijay Anand T. R. as Officer
- Amaresh Velladurai as Udhay
- Preejo as Victor
- Vasu as Driver

== Reception ==
Thinkal Menon of OTT Play wrote that "Had the makers focused more on character detailing and technical output, the film would have been more gripping". Bobby Sing of The Free Press Journal stated that "Besides, this also deserves to be seen for its effective camerawork, crisp editing, and background score, contributing majorly to the film’s gripping impact. Having said that, it certainly would have been a new-age gem with a little more detailing of the characters exploring their criminal psyche".
