= Evvarikee Cheppoddu =

Indian Telugu-language romantic drama film

- Official poster
- Directed by: Basava Shanker
- Produced by: Rakesh Varre
- Starring: Rakesh Varre; Gargeyi Yellapragada
- Music by: Shankar Sharma
- Release date: 8 October 2019
- Country: India
- Language: Telugu

Evvarikee Cheppoddu (transl. Don't tell anyone) is a 2019 Indian Telugu-language romantic drama film directed by Basava Shankar. The film stars Rakesh Varre (in his lead debut) and newcomer Gargeyi Yellapragada. The film was released to positive reviews.

== Cast ==
- Rakesh Varre as Hari
- Gargeyi Yellapragada as Harathi
- Vamsi Raj Nekkanti as Harathi's father

== Production ==
Basava Shankar, who worked as an assistant director for Run Raja Run and Pelli Choopulu, made his directorial debut with this film.

== Soundtrack ==
Music by Shankar Sharma and lyrics by Vasu Valaboju.

- "Reppakuda Veyaniva" - Divya S. Menon
- "Idi Chakkani Vela" - Sanoop Kalarikkal, Anju Joseph
- "Ayyo Ayyayyo" - Mano
- "Avuna Nijamena" - KS Harisankar and Shashaa Tirupati

== Reception ==
A critic from The Times of India gave the film a rating of three out of five stars and opined that "Evvarikee Cheppoddu is like a surprising, breath of fresh air in midst of all the mass masala. Debutant Basava Shankar selected a script that tells the same ol’ tale. But the way he handles it, exploring something like caste feeling with a humorous touch is what sets him apart". A critic from 123telugu said that "On the whole, Evvarikee Cheppoddu is a message-oriented love story that impresses in bits and pieces. The chemistry between the lead pair and a few romantic scenes related to them are showcased well".

== Home media ==
The film is available to stream on Netflix.
