= Manja Satta Pacha Satta =

2021 Indian film by Thamba Kutti Bambrosky

- Official poster
- Directed by: Thamba Kutti Bambrosky
- Written by: Thamba Kutti Bambrosky
- Produced by: Chinnasamy Mounaguru
- Starring: Guru Somasundaram; Adithya Varman; Renu Soundar
- Cinematography: MRM Jai Suresh
- Edited by: Thyagu
- Music by: Ganesh Raghavendra
- Release date: 2 April 2021
- Country: India
- Language: Tamil

Manja Satta Pacha Satta (transl. Yellow shirt, green shirt) is a 2021 Indian Tamil-language satirical film directed by Thamba Kutti Bambrosky and starring Guru Somasundaram, Adithya Varman and Renu Soundar.

== Cast ==
- Guru Somasundaram
- Adithya Varman
- Renu Soundar

== Production ==
Writer Thamba Kutti Bambrosky, known for his short story Kalki, made his directorial debut with this film, which was made in the Neo-Burlesque genre. Guru Somasundaram plays a politician in the film.

== Release and reception ==
The film was scheduled to release in 2020 but was delayed.

A critic from Maalai Malar called the film a laugh riot.
