= Senthil Krishna =

Indian actor

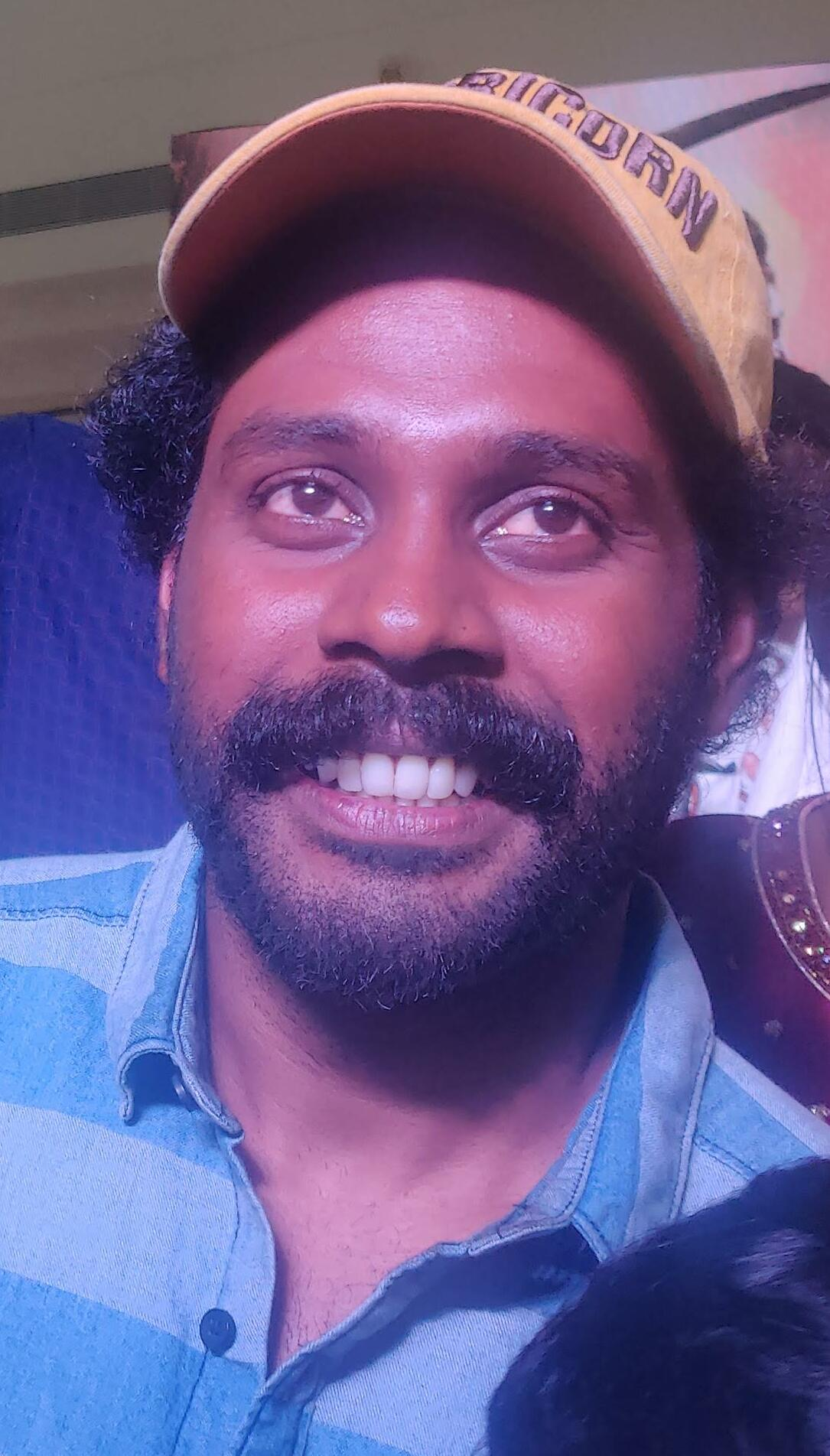
- Senthil in 2022
- Born: Punnamoodu, Thiruvanandapuram
- Occupation: Actor
- Years active: 2008-Present

Senthil Krishna, also known as Senthil Rajamani, is an Indian actor known for roles in Malayalam films and Television. His most notable performance is in 2018 biographical film Chalakkudykkaran Changathy, where he played the title character as Kalabhavan Mani.

== Personal life ==
He married Akhila from Kozhikode on 24 August 2019 at Guruvayoor Sreekrishna Temple.

== Filmography ==
Key
| † | Denotes films that have not yet been released |

- All films are in Malayalam language unless otherwise noted.

=== Films ===
| Year | Title | Role | Notes |
|---|---|---|---|
| 2010 | Pulliman | | Uncredited |
| 2018 | Mohanlal | Kanakambaran | Debut |
| 2018 | Chalakkudykkaran Changathy | Rajamani | |
| 2019 | My Great Grandfather | Vijayan | |
| 2019 | Virus | Minister CP | |
| 2019 | Aakasha Ganga 2 | S.I. T.Balaraman | |
| 2021 | Udumbu | Ani | |
| 2021 | Vidhi | | |
| 2022 | Kuttavum Shikshayum | SI Rajeevan | |
| 2022 | Pathonpatham Noottandu | Chirikkandan | |
| 2022 | The Teacher | Master | |
| 2022 | Oh Meri Laila | Prof Pradeep | |
| 2022 | Varaal | Mohsin | |
| 2023 | Thuramukham | Srank | |
| 2023 | Tha Thavalayude Tha | | |
| 2023 | Enthada Saji | Vishnu "Minnal" | |
| 2023 | Oruvattam Koodi | Johny Thomas | |
| 2023 | Pulli | | |
| 2024 | Abraham Ozler | SI Sijo | |
| 2024 | Anchakkallakokkan | Kolliyan | |
| 2024 | Grrr | CI Kamalesh | |
| 2024 | DNA | Sunil | |
| 2024 | Bad Boyz | Alosh | |
| 2025 | Ariku | Koran | |
| 2025 | Raveendra Nee Evide? | Preman | |
| 2026 | Sambhavam Adhyayam Onnu | | |
| 2026 | Bhishmar | | |
| 2026 | Disco † | TBA | |

=== Television ===
| Year | Serial | Role | Channel |
|---|---|---|---|
| 2008 | Sanmassulavarkku Samadhanam | | Asianet |
| 2011 | Autograph | Purushu | Asianet |
| 2012 | Decent Family | Bengali | Jaihind TV |
| 2012-2016 | Sthreedhanam | Natholi Nelson | Asianet |
| 2014-2017 | Vellanakalude Nadu | Manjulan | Asianet |
| 2025 | Inspection Bungalow | Balamurali | ZEE5 |
