= Ikk =

2021 Indian film

- Theatrical release poster
- Directed by: Babu Tamizh
- Written by: Babu Tamizh
- Produced by: Naveen
- Starring: Yogesh; Guru Somasundaram; Anicka Vikhraman
- Cinematography: K.S.Radhakrishnan
- Edited by: Manikumaran Sankara
- Music by: Gavaskar Avinash
- Production company: Dharmraj Films
- Release date: 10 December 2021
- Running time: 109 minutes
- Country: India
- Language: Tamil

Ikk is a 2021 Indian Tamil-language action adventure film written and directed by Babu Tamizh (Jiivi's writer) in his directional debut and produced by Dharmraj Films. The film stars debutant Yogesh, Guru Somasundaram and Anicka Vikhraman with a supporting cast including Y. G. Mahendran and Aadukalam Naren. The film released in theatres on 10 December 2021.

== Cast ==
- Yogesh as Vasanth Chandrasekhar
- Guru Somasundaram as Gnanaprakasam
- Anicka Vikhraman as Dhanya Vasanth
- Y. G. Mahendran
- Aadukalam Naren as Kanagavel Rajan

== Reception ==
Bhuvanesh Chandar of Cinema Express gave a rating of 2 out on 5 and wrote, "Writing a story with an unreliable narrator isn't an easy feat, but it is effective only when it translates into an engaging watch. If only Ikk had turned into one, it would have been as unique as the title." Behindwoods gave a rating of 2.5 out on 5 and wrote, "Babu Tamizh's unique concept and writing makes Ikk an engaging watch."
