= Bhavan's Vidya Mandir, Poochatty =

Location
- Thrissur, Kerala; India; 10.5109°N 76.2678°E

Information
- Type: Private co-educational high school
- Motto: आनो भद्राः क्रतवो यन्तु विश्वतः (Sanskrit, Rig Veda 1.89.1) (Let noble thoughts come to us from every side)
- Established: 1979
- Principal: Chitra S. Nair
- Faculty: 96
- Grades: PreK–12
- Enrollment: 4000
- Campus: Semi-urban; 8 acres (3.2 ha)
- Houses: Nalanda, Takshashila, Vikramshila, Vishwabharati
- Colors: Sky blue and Navy blue
- Accreditation: All India Secondary School Examination, Higher Secondary Examination
- Affiliations: Central Board of Secondary Education
- Website: http://www.bvbpoochatty.in/

Bhavan's Vidya Mandir, Poochatty is a private co-educational school located in Poochatty, Thrissur, Kerala, India. It is a part of the Bharatiya Vidya Bhavan trust and is affiliated to the Central Board of Secondary Education, Delhi. The school offers classes from kindergarten to junior college. In addition to the main campus, it also has a satellite campus in the city.

== Overview ==
Bhavan's Vidya Mandir, Poochatty was established in the year 1979. The school was approved by the Central Board of Secondary Education on 7 October 1985. During the early days, the school functioned from leased buildings, moving to its present location on 10 December 1986. The then president of India, Giani Zail Singh, was chief guest for the inaugural function of the new campus. The school has an indoor sports complex, and individual hostels for both boys and girls with a combined strength of 200.

== Principals ==
- Ammini Brahmini Amma (1979–1984)
- Annapoorna Shastri (1984–1986)
- P. Haridas Menon (1987–1990)
- S. Rama Rathnam (1990–1991)
- K. Krishnan (1991–1992)
- E. P. Aravindakshan (1992–1993)
- I. Vijayan (1993–1996)
- V. Gopalan (1996–2003)
- Shantha Muralidharan (2003–2007)
- Thomas K. Joseph (2007–2010)
- Sujata Sivakrishnan (2010–2014)
- V. Manoranjini (2014–2017)
- Sujatha Menon (2017–2022)
- Chitra S. Nair (2022–present)
