= News Today =

English evening daily newspaper in Chennai, India

- Type: Daily
- Format: Print, online
- Publisher: T R Ramaswami
- Founded: 1982; 44 years ago
- Political alignment: Independent
- Language: English
- City: Chennai
- Country: India
- Circulation: 85,000
- Website: www.newstodaynet.com

News Today is an English language evening daily newspaper in Chennai, India. It is published from India every evening since 1982.

== History ==
News Today was started in 1982 by T. R. Ramaswami, an editor formerly connected with Patriot and Link in New Delhi and with the Federation of Working Journalists, as an evening English daily in Chennai. It is now published by News Today Media Pvt. Ltd., with T. R. Jawahar listed as publisher and editor in the Press Registrar General of India's register.
