= Guru Somasundaram =

Indian actor

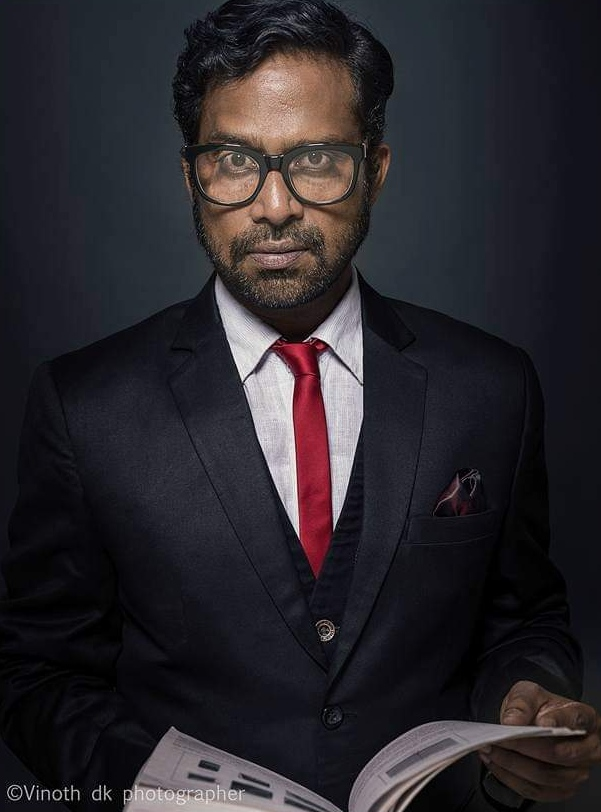
- Somasundaram during a photoshoot
- Born: September 3, 1975 (age 51); Madurai, Tamil Nadu, India
- Education: Government Polytechnic College, Tamil Nadu
- Occupation: Actor
- Years active: 2011–present

Guru Somasundaram is an Indian actor who works in the Tamil, Malayalam and Telugu films

== Early life ==
Guru Somasundaram was born on 3 September 1975. He joined the prominent Tamil theatre group in Koothu-P-Pattarai, where he acted in plays from 2002 till 2011. In 2003, director Thiagarajan Kumararaja saw him, while he was playing the role of Chandrahari in Koothu-P-Pattarai's play. Thiagarajan offered him an opportunity to feature in his future film.

== Career ==
In 2008, Thiagrajan offered Somasundram a role in his neo-noir film Aaranya Kaandam, as the drunkard Kaalaiyan. Somasundaram lost seven kilograms and underwent training for the movie. Upon release in 2011, the film went on to win two National Film Awards, while Somasundaram's performance was well received by critics. Rediff.com's critic praised the ensemble cast but added "the honours undoubtedly go to Guru Somasundaram. His gleeful cackles at the rooster fight, pathetic rumblings to his son and wide-eyed act in the Lodge are wonderful to behold." Similarly Behindwoods.com noted that the actor had delivered a "superior" performance. After seeing his performance, director Mani Ratnam signed him on to play a small role in Kadal (2013).

After leaving Koothu-P-Pattarai, he toured as a freelance theatre actor, before venturing into Malayalam cinema by portraying a photographer in 5 Sundarikal (2013), after being impressed by Shyju Khaled's narration. Later that year, he was seen in a character role in Suseenthiran's critically acclaimed Pandiya Naadu, portraying the slain brother of Vishal's character. In between feature films, he appeared in the short silent film The Lost Paradise, portraying a prisoner heading home after fifteen years. He also won acclaim for his performance as an acting coach in Karthik Subbaraj's gangster film Jigarthanda (2014), where he was seen giving acting training to the character portrayed by Bobby Simha. Somasundaram had previously trained Simha as an actor in real life during the pair's theatre performances. He is also known for his role as a district collector in the 2019 Tamil film Petta which starred Rajinikanth in the lead role.

== Filmography ==
=== Films ===
| Year | Title | Role | Language | Notes |
|---|---|---|---|---|
| 2011 | Aaranya Kaandam | Kaalaiyan | Tamil | |
| 2013 | Kadal | Kovil Kutty | Tamil | |
| 2013 | 5 Sundarikal | Photographer | Malayalam | |
| 2013 | Pandiya Naadu | Nagaraj | Tamil | |
| 2014 | Jigarthanda | Muthu | Tamil | |
| 2015 | 49-O | Aarumugam | Tamil | |
| 2015 | Bench Talkies | David | Tamil | Segment: The Lost Paradise; credited as David |
| 2015 | Thoongaa Vanam | Duraipandian | Tamil | Bilingual film |
| 2015 | Cheekati Rajyam | Duraipandian | Telugu | Bilingual film |
| 2015 | Kohinoor | Naayakkar | Malayalam | |
| 2016 | Joker | Mannar Mannan | Tamil | |
| 2016 | Kuttrame Thandanai | Balan | Tamil | |
| 2017 | Yaakkai | Sriram | Tamil | |
| 2017 | Paambhu Sattai | Rajendran | Tamil | |
| 2018 | Odu Raja Odu | Manohar | Tamil | |
| 2018 | Vanjagar Ulagam | Sampath | Tamil | |
| 2019 | Petta | District collector | Tamil | |
| 2021 | Maara | Chokku | Tamil | |
| 2021 | Manja Satta Pacha Satta | | Tamil | |
| 2021 | Jai Bhim | Public Prosecutor (PP) Chellapandiyan | Tamil | |
| 2021 | Ikk | Gnana Prakasam | Tamil | |
| 2021 | Minnal Murali | Shibu | Malayalam | |
| 2022 | Maamanithan | Vappa Bhai | Tamil | |
| 2022 | Agent Kannayiram | Kannayiram's father | Tamil | |
| 2022 | Haya | Nandagopan | Malayalam | |
| 2022 | Naalam Mura | Jayesh | Malayalam | |
| 2023 | Pakalum Paathiravum | Janakiraman | Malayalam | |
| 2023 | Yaathisai | Priest | Tamil | |
| 2023 | Charles Enterprises | Gomathi's husband | Malayalam | |
| 2023 | Neeraja | Psychologist | Malayalam | |
| 2023 | Bell | Brahma | Tamil | |
| 2023 | Rani: The Real Story | Dharmajan | Malayalam | |
| 2023 | Spark Life | Dr. Rudra | Telugu | |
| 2024 | Bayamariya Brammai | Jagadish | Tamil | |
| 2024 | Indian 2 | Common Man (Animated character) [In body suit] | Tamil | |
| 2024 | Cup | Babu | Malayalam | |
| 2024 | Barroz 3D | S. P. Subramanyam | Malayalam | |
| 2024 | Her | Auto driver | Malayalam | Anthology film |
| 2025 | Kudumbasthan | Rajendran | Tamil | |
| 2025 | Bottle Radha | Radha | Tamil | |
| 2025 | Maranamass | Tattoo artist | Malayalam | Cameo |
| 2026 | Parasakthi | M. Karunanidhi | Tamil | |
| 2026 | My Lord | Kathirvelan | Tamil | |
| 2027 | Dragon | | Telugu | |

=== Short films ===
- Oru Poi (2016)
- Irudhi Aram (2017)

=== Web series ===
| Year | Title | Role | Language | Platform | Notes |
|---|---|---|---|---|---|
| 2020 | Topless | Kalki (Politician) | Tamil | ZEE5 | |
| 2022 | Meme Boys | College Deen | Tamil | SonyLIV | |
| 2022 | Victim | Guna | Tamil | SonyLIV | |

== Awards and nominations ==
| Year | Award | Category | Film | Language | Result | Ref |
|---|---|---|---|---|---|---|
| 2017 | Behindwoods Gold Medal | Best Actor Male | Joker | Tamil | Won | |
| 2022 | 10th South Indian International Movie Awards | Best Actor in a Negative Role | Minnal Murali | Malayalam | Won | |
| 2022 | Mazhavil Entertainment Awards | Best Actor in a Villain Role | Minnal Murali | Malayalam | Won | |
| 2022 | OTT Play Awards | Breakthrough Performance of the Year | Minnal Murali | Malayalam | Won | |
