= Etcetera Entertainment =

Indian film studio

- Industry: Entertainment
- Founded: Chennai, Tamil Nadu, India
- Founder: V. Mathiyazhagan
- Headquarters: Chennai
- Products: Films

Etcetera Entertainment is an Indian film production and distribution company headed by V. Mathiyazhagan.

== History ==
Etcetera Entertainment began producing and distributing Tamil films in 2015, notably working on Samuthirakani's Appa (2016) and Atharvaa's Semma Botha Aagathey (2018). The film also produced four films with actor Dhruvva in the lead role.

In 2019, the studio bought the rights of the long-delayed Kolaiyuthir Kaalam from Yuvan Shankar Raja's K Productions, and prepared the film for release. During the promotions for the film's release, the film's lead actress Nayanthara initially distanced herself from the project, calling it an "incomplete" film.

In the early 2020s, the studio ran into financial trouble following the failure of several of its films. Mathiazhagan filed a police complaint against Atharvaa for failing to compensate as promised for losses experienced during the making of Semma Botha Aagathey (2018). Atharvaa had initially committed to work on a venture titled Minnal Veeran by A. R. K. Saravan for Etcetera Entertainment free of cost, but later refused to do so. As a result of the financial trouble, Maha starring Hansika Motwani went through production hell before releasing belatedly in 2022. Prior to the release of the film, Madhiazhagan and the film's director Jameel publicly argued about whether the film was complete or not. Likewise, projects such as Arvind Swami's Pulanaivu and Arun Vijay's Boxer were indefinitely put on hold.

In June 2020, Mathiazhagan announced plans of working as an actor, and revealed that he would make his debut with a role in Boxer. He also revealed that he was working on a film co-starring Sathyaraj, choreographer Bobby Antony's directorial debut, as well as on ventures by directors G. R. Adithya and Savari Muthu.

== Filmography ==
=== As producer ===
Year	Film	Director	Cast	Notes	Ref
2015	Thilagar	G. Peruma Pillai	Kishore, Dhruvva, Mrudhula Bhaskar		
2016	Raja Manthiri	Usha Krishnan	Kalaiyarasan, Kaali Venkat, Shaalin Zoya		
2016	Appa	Samuthirakani	Samuthirakani, Thambi Ramaiah, Namo Narayana		
2017	Kadhal Kasakuthaiya	Dwarakh Raja	Dhruvva, Venba, Charle		
2018	Semma Botha Aagathey	Badri Venkatesh	Atharvaa, Mishti, Anaika Soti		
2018	Marainthirunthu Paarkum Marmam Enna	R. Raheshe	Dhruvva, Aishwarya Dutta, Anjana Prem		
2019	Kolaiyuthir Kaalam	Chakri Toleti	Nayanthara, Bhumika Chawla, Prathap Pothen		
2021	Devadas Brothers	Janakiraman	Dhruvva, Ajai Prasath, Sanchita Shetty		
2022	Kallan	Chandra Thangaraj	Karu Pazhaniappan, Nikita, Maya Chandran		
2022	Maha	U. R. Jameel	Hansika Motwani, Srikanth, Sujith Shankar		
2024	Saamaniyan	R. Raheshe	Ramarajan, Radharavi, M. S. Bhaskar		
2024	Khaimara	Gautham VP	Priyanka Upendra, Priyamani	Filming	
2024	Boxer	Vivek	Arun Vijay, Ritika Singh	Filming	
2024	Pulanaivu	Santhosh P. Jayakumar	Arvind Swami, Regina Cassandra	Filming	

=== As distributor ===
- Eli (2015)
- Vaalu (2015)
- Pichaikkaran (2016)
- Iru Mugan (2016)
- Devi 2 (2019)
