= Parminder =

Parminder may refer to:

- Parminder Ghumman, Indian voice actor
- Parminder Nagra, English actress who starred in 2002 film Bend It Like Beckham
- Parminder Singh Dhindsa, Indian politician from Punjab
- Parminder Singh Dhull, Indian politician from Haryana
- Parminder Singh Saini, Indian skyjacker who immigrated to Canada
