= Venba =

Venba may refer to:

- Venpa or Venba, a form of Tamil poetry
- Venba (actress), an Indian film actress in Tamil-language films, lead role in the 2017 film Kadhal Kasakuthaiya
- Venba (video game), released in 2023
