= R. Rathnam =

Indian music composer

- Born: Jeeva Rathna; 16 May 1923
- Died: 9 January 2021 (aged 97); Bengaluru
- Occupation: Music composer

Jeeva Rathna also known as R Rathna mononymously as R. Rathnam (16 May 1923 - 9 January 2021) was an Indian music composer who had worked in Kannada, Tamil, Malayalam, Hindi, Tulu and Telugu film industry

== Career ==
Jeeva Rathna entered the Tamil film industry as an actor with Danashura Karna. He didn't get success in acting Later he showed interest in composing music to films and joined as an assistant music director Tamil film industry. After getting experience in music he become full-fledged music composer in the movie "Mane Katti Nodu" in 1961starring Uday Kumar, Dwarakish, Meenakumari and others which became hit.

== Filmography ==
Year	Film	Language	Director	Producer	Notes
1961	Mane Katti Nodu	Kannada	Sri Sadguru	C. V. Shivashankar and Friends	
1967	Padavidhara	Kannada	C. V. Shivashankar	C. K. Gowda	
1968	Namma Ooru	Kannada	C. V. Shivashankar	J N Shetty, S N Rao, B S Narayan	
1969	Kappu Bilupu	Kannada	Puttanna Kanagal	Ravikumar	
1969	Chaduranga	Kannada	N C Rajan	Sakkamma	
1971	Bandhavya	Kannada	K M Rathnakar, R Madhusudhan	Sorat Ashwath, K M Rathnakar, R Madhusudhan	

== Awards ==
- 2013 – Karnataka Rajyotsava Award by Government of Karnataka
