= Ice Cream 2 =

- Fear getting hotter
- Directed by: Ram Gopal Varma
- Written by: Ram Gopal Varma
- Produced by: Tummalapalli Rama Satyanarayana
- Starring: J. D. Chakravarthy; Naveena
- Cinematography: Anji
- Edited by: Nagendra Adapa
- Music by: Sanga Pratap Kumar
- Production company: Bhimavaram Talkies
- Release date: 21 November 2014
- Country: India
- Language: Telugu

Ice Cream 2 is a 2014 Indian Telugu slasher film, directed by Ram Gopal Varma which released on 21 November 2014 to negative reviews from critics. The film is a sequel to Ice Cream (2014), also directed by Varma, starring J. D. Chakravarthy and Naveena.

== Plot ==
A crew of eight amateur film makers approach a noted film producer (Ram Gopal Varma) to finance their film. However, the producer rejects their directorial ability due to lack of experience, and offers to buy their script.

The team decline the producer's offer and decide to show case their skills to the producer by making a short film. In the process, the team selects an abandoned chemical factory in the outskirts of the city. It is believed that a fire accident killed several employees of the abandoned factory, and is now haunted by ghosts. The team starts shooting their film at the site. In the process, the team members slowly disappear. It is revealed that the short film maker's are being kidnapped by a group of burglars who after robbing a rich businessman, hide themselves in a den fearing an unknown killer in the vicinity.

The injured burglars and the crew suspect each other, in the meantime one of the crew members try to escape the den, only to get killed by an unknown killer (it is later revealed that the unknown killer is a psychopathic serial killer, who becomes mentally unstable after he loses his family in the fire accident at the abandoned chemical factory). The killer slashes all the crew and burglars.

However, only a single crew member and a single burglar manage to escape the wrath of the psychopath, as the burglar kills the psychopath and burns him to death. The film ends when the burglar drops the crew member at her residence, while he finds her as erotic as an ice cream and gives her his mobile number.

== Cast ==
- J. D. Chakravarthy as Sikka
- Naveena
- Ram Gopal Varma as producer
- Jeeva
- Dhanraj as a filmmaker
- Bhoopal as a filmmaker
- Siddu Jonnalagadda as a filmmaker
- Nandu as a filmmaker
- Gayathri Gupta as a filmmaker

== Soundtrack ==
The music was composed by Satya Kashyap and released by E3Music.

Track list
No.	Title	Lyrics	Singer(s)	Length
1.	"Kiss Me"	Sirasri	Sunitha Upadrashta	4:07
2.	"Challa Challaga"	S.V.V. Ramanjaneyulu	Uma Neha, Akshara Parashar	2:53
3.	"Kiss Me (Remix)"	Sirasri	Sunitha Upadrashta	3:49
4.	"Ice Cream Theme"		Instrumental	3:19
Total length:				24:38

== Reception ==
A critic from The Hans India rated the film two-and-a-half out of five stars and wrote that "Run of the mill story, nothing extraordinary to write home about. Watch it if you are an RGV fan". Hemanth Kumar of The Times of India gave it two out of five stars and wrote that "Everything that can go wrong does go wrong throughout the film, although it's hard to empathise with any character either dead or alive. And it makes you wonder, if the story is stretched far beyond its merit".
