= Khamoshi (2019 film) =

2019 film by Chakri Toleti

- Poster
- Directed by: Chakri Toleti
- Written by: Chakri Toleti
- Screenplay by: Dheeraj Rattan
- Dialogues by: Dheeraj Rattan; Sarath Mandava; Mohammad Jaffer Bakshayee
- Based on: Hush by Mike Flanagan
- Produced by: Vashu Bhagnani; Deepshikha Deshmukh
- Starring: Prabhu Deva; Tamannaah Bhatia; Bhumika Chawla; Sanjay Suri
- Cinematography: Cory Geryak
- Edited by: Shakti Hasija
- Music by: Shamir Tandon; Satya Manik Afsar; Simaab Sen (score); Vishwadeep Zeest (Lyrics)
- Production companies: Pyx; Eyka Films
- Distributed by: Pen Marudhar
- Release date: 14 June 2019
- Running time: 86 minutes
- Country: India
- Language: Hindi

Khamoshi (transl. Silence) is a 2019 Indian Hindi-language slasher film directed by Chakri Toleti and produced by Vashu Bhagnani and Deepshikha Deshmukh. The film stars Prabhu Deva with Tamannaah Bhatia playing a deaf and mute person. It is a remake of the delayed 2019 Tamil film Kolaiyuthir Kaalam, also directed by Toleti, which is itself a remake of the 2016 American film Hush. The film was theatrically released on 14 June 2019.

== Cast ==
Adapted from the opening and closing credits:

- Prabhu Deva as Dev
- Tamannaah Bhatia as Surabhi
- Sanjay Suri as Mr Desai
- Bhumika Chawla Mrs. Desai
- Akash Khurana as Anand, the Estate Manager
- Vipin Sharma as Pasha, a police officer
- Beena Banerjee as Karuna, the cook
- Vikram Bhatt as Dev's father
- Sunny Pawar as Young Dev
- Samruddhi Asarkar as Young Surabhi

== Production ==
In March 2017, Chakri Toleti announced that his new Bollywood film was in production with Vashu Bhagnani. The film was shot entirely in London, with the entire shoot completed in 25 days. Prabhu Deva stars as the lead antagonist, while Tamannaah Bhatia playing a deaf and mute protagonist. Bhumika Chawla has a pivotal role in the film.

== Music ==
Khamoshi

Studio album by Shamir Tandon
- Released: 2019
- Recorded: 2018–19
- Studio: Yash Raj Studios
- Genre: Film soundtrack
- Label: Zee Music Company

The music of the film is composed by Shamir Tandon and lyrics are penned by Vishwadeep Zeest. Rap was written and performed by Babu Haabi. Zee Music Company holds the rights of music. The original background score is composed by Simaab Sen.

Track listing
No.	Title	Lyrics	Music	Singer(s)	Length
1.	"Khamoshi"	Vishwadeep Zeest	Shamir Tandon	Shruti Haasan	5:30

== Release ==
The film was theatrically released on 14 June 2019 in India.

== Reception ==
Pallabi Dey Purkayastha of The Times of India giving the film two stars out of five, feels that the film fails to hold attention of audience for too long and calls it a half-baked broth of a thriller. She concludes, "Khamoshi' shines in the beginning but then it becomes ice-cold half way into its murky narrative."
