= Unarvu =

2019 Indian drama film by Subu Venkat

- Directed by: Subu Venkat
- Written by: Kavi Velan
- Screenplay by: Subu Venkat
- Story by: Subu Venkat
- Produced by: Shekar Jayaram
- Starring: Suman; Aroul D. Shankar; Ankitha Navya; Shinav
- Cinematography: David Jan
- Edited by: P. Chandan
- Music by: Nakul Abhyankar
- Production company: Amrutha Film Center
- Release date: 19 July 2019
- Country: India
- Language: Tamil

Unarvu (transl. Feelings) is a 2019 Indian Tamil-language political drama film co-written and directed by Subu Venkat. It stars Suman, Aroul D. Shankar, Ankitha Navya and Shinav. Featuring music composed by Nakul Abhyankar, the film was released on 19 July 2019.

== Cast ==
- Shinav as Sathish
- Ankitha Navya as Nikitha
- Suman as Muthuswamy, the Chief Minister
- Aroul D. Shankar as Prabhakaran, the corrupt Chief Minister
- Subbu as Ramadurai
- Lawrence as Thambidurai
- Kanthasamy as Mani
- Bala Guru as Thamba
- Sunny Madhavan as Thanza
- Navaneethan as Paramuthu
- A. G. S. Kumar as Handicapped Beggar
- Amarkalam Sankar as Beggar
- Venkat Bharadwaj as Ramadorai
- Kottachi as Content Manager
- Natigar Shivashankar as Old Man
- Purushottam Adiga as Government Officer

== Production ==
The political drama film marked the first Tamil venture of director Venkat Bharadwaj, who had earlier made a A Day in the City and Kempirve (2017) in Kannada. The director changed his stagename from Venkat Bharadwaj to Subu Venkat, for the Tamil audience. He cast six important characters in the lead roles, including veteran actor Suman, model Ankitha Navya, Shinav and Aroul Shankar, who had previously featured in Yaman.

Prior to release, the film was screened at the Berlin Film Festival, Dadasaheb Phalke Film Festival and Kalasamrudhi Festival in Mumbai.

== Soundtrack ==
The film's soundtrack was composed by Nakul Abhyankar, an erstwhile assistant of A. R. Rahman. The songs were released in an audio function where Drums Sivamani appeared as a chief guest.

- "Naanum Neeyum" - Karthik
- "Enda Poovum" - Ramya Bhat
- "Whistle Podu" - Bamba Bakya

== Release ==
The film had a low profile opening across Tamil Nadu on 19 July 2019. In its review, The Times of India noted "the film is high on melodrama and tiring preachy dialogues which tests one’s patience". News Today gave the film a mixed review, claiming "had the director focused more on the second half, Unarvu would have been a must-watch."

The makers initially planned to dub the film into the Hindi language, but eventually did not do so.
