= Padavidhara =

- Directed by: C. V. Shivashankar
- Produced by: C. K. Gowda
- Starring: Udaykumar; Kalpana; T. N. Balakrishna; Narasimharaju
- Cinematography: G. Chandran
- Music by: R. Rathnam
- Release date: 1967
- Country: India
- Language: Kannada

Padavidhara ( transl. Graduate) is a 1967 Indian Kannada-language film, directed by C. V. Shivashankar and produced by C. K. Gowda. The film stars Udaykumar, Kalpana, T. N. Balakrishna and Narasimharaju in the lead roles. The musical score for the film was composed by R. Rathna.

== Cast ==
- Udaykumar
- Kalpana
- T. N. Balakrishna
- Narasimharaju
- M. N. Lakshmi Devi

== Soundtrack ==
The music was composed by Rathna.

| No. | Song | Singers | Lyrics | Length (m:ss) |
|---|---|---|---|---|
| 1 | "Karnaata Saamraajya" | Soolamangalam Rajalakshmi | C. V. Shiva Shankar | 03:00 |
| 2 | "Yarigagi Badukidano" | P. B. Sreenivas | C. V. Shiva Shankar | 03:20 |
