= Mrudhula Bhaskar =

Indian actress, dancer

Mrudhula Basker
- Born: Chennai, India
- Education: CMR Law School
- Occupations: Actress; dancer

Mrudhula Basker, also known as Naveena, is an Indian actress. She is best known for her role in the 2014 film Vallinam, directed by Arivazhagan Venkatachalam, and Ice Cream 2, directed by Ram Gopal Varma. She also performed in the Tamil films Marumunai and Thilagar. She debuted in Kannada cinema with the film Bablusha, directed by Venkat Bhardwaj.

Bhaskar is also the founder and artistic director of Nritya Moksh School, a Bharatanatyam dance school. She has a law degree from CMR Law School.

== Filmography ==
- All films are in Tamil, unless otherwise noted.

List of Mrudhula Basker film credits
Year	Title	Role	Notes
2014	Vallinam	Meera	
2014	Marumunai	Charumathi	
2014	Ice Cream 2		Telugu film
2015	Thilagar		
2016	Bablusha		Kannada film
