= Marumunai =

2014 Indian film by Mariesh Kumar

- Directed by: Mariesh Kumar
- Written by: Mariesh Kumar
- Produced by: PL Babu; PL Subbu
- Starring: Maruthi; Mrudhula Bhaskar
- Cinematography: ‘Punnagai’ Venkatesh
- Edited by: Sathish B. Kottai
- Music by: Sathyadev (songs); Taj Noor (score)
- Release date: 28 March 2014
- Country: India
- Language: Tamil

Marumunai (transl. The other end) is a 2014 Indian Tamil-language romantic drama film directed by Mariesh Kumar starring Maruthi and Mrudhula Bhaskar.

== Cast ==
- Maruthi as Kathir
- Mrudhula Bhaskar as Charumathi
- Manobala
- M. S. Bhaskar as Kathir's father
- Rajendran as a resort owner
- Rajasimman
- Cheran Raj
- C. Ranganathan
- Bonda Mani
- Anjali Devi
- Dr. Sharmila as Charu's mother
- John Ranjith
- Gana Bala in a special appearance

== Production ==
Mariesh Kumar, who worked as an assistant to K. Bhagyaraj and R. Pandiarajan, and wrote television serials before directing this film. Maruthi worked as an assistant director to Yaar Kannan and Vikraman before becoming an actor. The producers PL Balu and PL Subbu handled film distribution in Salem area. The film was shot in 60 locations in Salem district including Yercaud.

== Soundtrack ==
Songs by debutante Sathyadev, who worked for musician Prem Kumar. The soundtrack is composed of four songs:

- "Vazhkaithan" is written and is sung by Gana Bala
- "Penne Penne" is written by Mariesh Kumar and is sung by Silambarasan and Chinmayi
- "Kadhal Endru" is written by Piraisoodan and is sung by Velmurugan
- "Ivan Thano Margazhi" is written by Palani Bharathi and is sung by Aalap Raju

== Release and reception ==
Marumunai is released on 28 March 2014.

Malini Mannath of The New Indian Express opined that "Marumunai is an attempt to be different and a promising effort from a debutant". A critic from The Times of India gave the film a rating of two out of five stars and wrote that "Mariesh Kumar succeeds in getting your attention. His problem is he has trouble retaining it for the entire film". A critic from Maalaimalar criticised the title, old age story while praising the songs.
