= Kolaiyuthir Kaalam =

2019 film directed by Chakri Toleti

- Theatrical release poster
- Directed by: Chakri Toleti
- Based on: Hush by Mike Flanagan
- Produced by: V. Mathiyalagan
- Starring: Nayanthara; Bhumika Chawla; Pratap Pothen; Rohini Hattangadi
- Cinematography: Cory Greyak
- Edited by: Rameshwar S. Bhagat
- Music by: Achu Rajamani; Satya Manik Afsar
- Production company: Etcetera Entertainment
- Release date: 9 August 2019
- Running time: 100 minutes
- Country: India
- Language: Tamil

Kolaiyuthir Kaalam (transl. Season of murders) is a 2019 Indian Tamil-language horror thriller film directed by Chakri Toleti and produced by V. Mathiyalagan. A remake of the 2016 American film Hush, it follows a deaf-mute woman who must fight for her life when a killer appears at her door. The film, starring Nayanthara, Bhumika Chawla, Pratap Pothen, and Rohini Hattangadi, began production in November 2016. The film was released on 9 August 2019. A Hindi version Khamoshi (2019), also directed by Toleti, was released before this film.

== Plot ==
Shruthi is a deaf and mute girl who grew up in an orphanage in Chennai. Impressed with her personality and talent, a millionaire from the UK adopts her and makes her his legal heir. When she arrives in London, after the death of her adopted mother, trouble arises in the form of a home invasion. A strange man chases her inside the bungalow after killing all of the house staff, along with Anand, and also sets the will on fire. After being chased, she attempts to kill the man but Mrs. Anand steps in and shoots him. It is revealed that Mrs. Anand set up the attack in order to take all the assets for herself. When Shruthi refuses to agree to her demands, Mrs. Anand shoots her in the shoulder. He wakes up and kills Mrs. Anand. The following day, the police show up while Shruthi is waiting. Paramedics take her into the ambulance, and the masked man is missing. When getting medical attention in the ambulance, the paramedic has a skull tattoo and Shruthi seems distraught. The film ends without showing if Shruthi dies and the true identity of the masked man remains undisclosed.

== Cast ==
- Nayanthara as Shruthi Lawson
- Bhumika Chawla as Mrs. Sawant
- Pratap K. Pothen as Business Manager
- Rohini Hattangadi as Cook
- K. S. G. Venkatesh as Caretaker
- Prem Kathir as Mr. Sawant
- Julian Freund as James
- Jo Ellis as Darla
- Richard Banks as Paramedic
- Ruthvi as Abha Lawson

== Production ==
In mid-November 2016, Chakri Toleti began working on his fourth feature film, following the bilingual Unnaipol Oruvan (2009) and Billa II (2012). Nayanthara was selected to play the leading role, and it was revealed that the film would be a heroine-centric project. Later the same month the title was revealed to be Kolaiyuthir Kaalam. Production began in January 2017 in London, and the film was simultaneously shot in Hindi by the same director as Khamoshi. By April, Kolaiyuthir Kaalam was described as being "on the verge of completion". The film was produced by V. Mathiyalagan under Etcetera Entertainment, photographed by Cory Greyak and edited by Rameshwar S. Bhagat, while the background score was composed by Achu Rajamani.

== Release ==
Kolaiyuthir Kaalam was initially scheduled to release on 14 June 2019 but was delayed because of a lawsuit over the film's title. Director Balaji K. Kumar, who was planning an adaptation of Sujatha's novel Kolaiyuthir Kaalam, paid ₹10 lakh (equivalent to ₹12 lakh or US$13,000 in 2023) for the novel's rights and filed a lawsuit against the makers of the unrelated film, seeking to stop them from using the same title. The Madras High Court subsequently put an interim injunction on the film's release. However, at the end of the month, the court closed the lawsuit in favour of the defendants, with the title unchanged. The court declared that the title was not copyrighted and since the film had been widely publicised since 2016, criticised Balaji for filing a lawsuit when the film was too close to release. The film was then scheduled for release on 26 July, but continued to face delays, with one reported reason being the failure of Khamoshi. It was then dated for 1 August, but eventually released over a week later, on 9 August.

== Reception ==
M. Suganth of The Times of India wrote, "The film fails right in its set-up. These initial portions [...] are so badly directed, with terrible line readings that seem straight out of a dubbed film, that we lose interest right away" He added that the "portions involving the slasher, too, are laughably executed that we neither feel horrified nor thrilled" and even Nayanthara, "the Lady Superstar, seems ordinary and cannot save it". Gopinath Rajendran of The New Indian Express wrote, "Nayanthara is the only saving grace of the film [...] she looks close to perfect as the vulnerable and helpless Shruthi. And yet, it is hard for us to root for Shruthi who remains clueless till the very end". The film was also reviewed by Srivatsan S of The Hindu, and Sify.
