= Parminder Ghumman =

Indian voice actor

- Born: Jalandhar, Punjab, India
- Other name: Parminder Ghumman
- Occupation: Voice actor

Parminder Ghumman is an Indian voice actor who specializes for performing voices for local Indian productions and also dubs for foreign productions into the Hindi language, English, Punjabi, Urdu and Oriya.

He is a member of AVAIndia, which is an association group for Indian voice artists.

== Filmography ==
=== Animated films ===
| Year | Film title | Role | Language | Notes |
|---|---|---|---|---|
| 2007 | Bal Ganesh | Surapdaman | Hindi | |
| 2007 | Return of Hanuman | One-eyed man | Hindi | |
| 2009 | Bal Ganesh 2 | Mukhasur / Mooshakraj | Hindi | |
| 2011 | Chhutanki | Saand | Hindi | |
| 2015 | Bal Ganesh 3 | Mooshak | Hindi | |

== Dubbing career ==
Parminder has been known for dubbing for Middle-age male characters, as well as relaxed and loud characters.

== Dubbing roles ==
=== Animated series ===
| Program title | Original voice(s) | Character(s) | Dub language | Original language | Number of episodes | Original airdate | Dubbed airdate | Notes |
|---|---|---|---|---|---|---|---|---|
| X-Men: The Animated Series | Cal Dodd | James "Logan" Howlett / Wolverine | Hindi | English | 76 | 10/31/1992-9/20/1997 | | Aired on Cartoon Network India. |
| Batman: The Animated Series | Robert Costanzo | Detective Harvey Bullock | Hindi | English | 95 | 9/5/1992- 9/15/1995 | 9/9/2000-7/8/2005 | Aired on Cartoon Network India. Season 1 is streaming on Prime Video. |
| X-Men: Evolution | Scott McNeil | Logan / Wolverine | Hindi | English | 52 | 4 November 2000 – 25 October 2003 | | Aired on Cartoon Network India |
| Transformers: Prime | Frank Welker | Megatron | Hindi | English | 65 | 29 November 2010 – 26 July 2013 | | Aired on Discovery Kids India. Available at ट्रांसफाॅर्मर हिंदी - Transformers Hindi Official channel on YouTube. |
| Transformers: War for Cybertron Trilogy | Jason Marnocha | Megatron | Hindi | English | 18 | July 30, 2020 - July 29, 2021 | July 30, 2020 - July 29, 2021 | Streaming on Netflix. |
| The Incredible Hulk (1996 TV series) | Lou Ferrigno | Hulk | Hindi | English | | September 8, 1996 – November 23, 1997 | | Aired by Toon Disney. |

=== Live action films ===
==== Hollywood films ====
| Film title | Actor | Character | Dub language | Original language | Original Year release | Dub Year release | Notes |
|---|---|---|---|---|---|---|---|
| The Lord of the Rings: The Two Towers | Bernard Hill | Théoden (First Dub) | Hindi | English | 2002 | 2003 | Voiced Théoden for the first Hindi Dub. A second dub was made for UTV Action in 2011. |
| The Lord of the Rings: The Return of the King | Bernard Hill | Théoden (First Dub) | Hindi | English | 2003 | 2004 | Voiced Théoden for the first Hindi Dub. A second dub was made for UTV Action in 2011. |
| Hulk | Unknown actor | Unknown character | Hindi | English | 2003 | 2003 | |
| The Incredible Hulk | Unknown actor | Unknown character | Hindi | English | 2008 | 2008 | |
| The Chronicles of Narnia: The Voyage of the Dawn Treader | Unknown actor | Unknown character | Hindi | English | 2010 | 2010 | Parminder's name was mentioned on the Hindi dub credits of the DVD release of the film, also containing the Tamil and Telugu credits. |
| Predators | Danny Trejo | Cuchillo | Hindi | English | 2010 | 2010 | |
| Transformers | Hugo Weaving | Megatron (voice) | Hindi | English | 2007 | 2007 | Performed alongside Saumya Daan who voiced Shia LaBeouf as Sam Witwicky, Mona Ghosh Shetty who voiced Megan Fox as Mikaela Banes and Shailendra Pandey who voiced Optimus Prime, replacing Peter Cullen's voice in the Hindi dubbed version. |
| Transformers: Revenge of the Fallen | Hugo Weaving | Megatron (voice) | Hindi | English | 2009 | 2009 | Performed alongside Saumya Daan who voiced Shia LaBeouf as Sam Witwicky, Mona Ghosh Shetty who voiced Megan Fox as Mikaela Banes and Shailendra Pandey who voiced Optimus Prime, replacing Peter Cullen's voice in the Hindi dubbed version. |
| Transformers: Dark of the Moon | Hugo Weaving | Megatron (voice) | Hindi | English | 2011 | 2011 | Performed alongside Saumya Daan who voiced Shia LaBeouf as Sam Witwicky. |
| Tekken | Cary-Hiroyuki Tagawa | Heihachi Mishima | Hindi | English | 2010 | 2010 | |
| Daredevil | Michael Clarke Duncan | Wilson Fisk / The Kingpin | Hindi | English | 2003 | 2003 | Performed alongside Prasad Barve who voiced Scott Terra and Leland Orser as Young Matt Murdock and Wesley Owen Welch respectively and Kishore Bhatt who voiced David Keith and Joe Pantoliano as Jack Murdock and Ben Urich respectively in Hindi. Both Prasad Barve and Kishore Bhatt had voiced 2 characters in the Hindi dub. |
| Iron Man 2 | Mickey Rourke | Ivan Vanko | Hindi | English | 2010 | 2010 | Performed alongside Rajesh Khattar who voiced Robert Downey Jr. as Tony Stark/Iron Man and Rajesh Jolly who voiced Don Cheadle as Lt. Col. James 'Rhodey' Rhodes / War Machine in Hindi. |
| Ghost Rider | Peter Fonda | Mephistopheles | Hindi | English | 2007 | 2007 | Performed alongside Rajesh Khattar who voiced Nicolas Cage as Ghost Rider/Johnny Blaze, Viraj Adhav who voiced Wes Bentley as Blackheart, Samay Raj Thakkar who voiced Donal Logue as Mack and Rajesh Jolly who voiced Sam Elliott as Caretaker in Hindi. |
| Thor | Idris Elba | Heimdall | Hindi | English | 2011 | 2011 | Performed alongside Saptrishi Ghosh who voiced Tom Hiddleston as Loki in Hindi. |
| Thor: The Dark World | Idris Elba | Heimdall | Hindi | English | 2013 | 2013 | Performed alongside Saptrishi Ghosh who voiced Tom Hiddleston as Loki in Hindi. |
| Avengers: Age of Ultron | Idris Elba | Heimdall | Hindi | English | 2015 | 2015 | |
| Thor: Ragnarok | Idris Elba | Heimdall | Hindi | English | 2017 | 2017 | Performed alongside Saptrishi Ghosh who voiced Tom Hiddleston as Loki in Hindi. |
| Avengers: Infinity War | Idris Elba | Heimdall | Hindi | English | 2018 | 2018 | Performed alongside Saptrishi Ghosh who voiced Tom Hiddleston as Loki in Hindi. |
| Deadpool 2 | Ryan Reynolds (voice) | Juggernaut (voice) | Hindi | English | 2018 | 2018 | |

==== South Indian films ====
| Film title | Actor | Character | Dub language | Original language | Original Year release | Dub Year release | Notes |
|---|---|---|---|---|---|---|---|
| Sivaji: The Boss | Mahadevan | Astrologer | Hindi | Tamil | 2007 | 2008 | |
| Rebel | Mukesh Rishi | Jayram/Robert | Hindi | Telugu | 2012 | 2014 | The Hindi dub was re-titled: The Return of Rebel. |
| Racha | Mukesh Rishi | Bellary | Hindi | Telugu | 2012 | 2014 | The Hindi dub was re-titled: Betting Raja. |
| Ramanaa | Mukesh Rishi | Jalandhar Singh | Hindi | Tamil | 2002 | 2015 | The Hindi dub was re-titled: Mar Mitenge 3. |
| Son of Satyamurthy | Sampath Raj | Veeraswamy Naidu | Hindi | Telugu | 2015 | 2016 | |
| Srimanthudu | Surya Kumar Bhagvandas | Ravikanth's accountant | Hindi | Telugu | 2015 | 2016 | The Hindi dub was re-titled: The Real Tevar. |
| Jil | Supreeth Reddy | Ghora | Hindi | Telugu | 2015 | 2016 | |
| Sarrainodu | Kitty | Chief Minister Reddy | Hindi | Telugu | 2016 | 2017 | |
| Soukhyam | Mukesh Rishi | Krishna Rao | Hindi | Telugu | 2015 | 2017 | The Hindi dub was re-titled: Mard Ki Zaban 2. |
| Pandavulu Pandavulu Thummeda | Mukesh Rishi | Suyodhana | Hindi | Telugu | 2014 | 2017 | The Hindi dub was re-titled: Sabse Badi Hera Pheri 3. |
| Dhada | Mukesh Rishi | Rhea's father | Hindi | Telugu | 2011 | 2013 | |
| K.G.F: Chapter 1 | B. S. Avinash | Andrews | Hindi | Kannada | 2018 | 2018 | |

=== Animated films ===
| Film title | Original Voice(s) | Character(s) | Dub language | Original language | Original Year release | Dub Year release | Notes |
|---|---|---|---|---|---|---|---|
| Batman: Mask of the Phantasm | Stacy Keach | Phantasm | Hindi | English | 1993 | 2000 | Aired by Cartoon Network on 25 November 2000. |
| Batman & Mr. Freeze: SubZero | Robert Costanzo | Detective Harvey Bullock | Hindi | English | 1998 | | |
| Barbie and the Diamond Castle | Mark Acheson Michael Dobson | Slyder Inn Keeper | Hindi | English | 2008 | 2008 | Only the dialogues were dubbed into Hindi. The songs were kept in their original English format. |
| Puss in Boots | Billy Bob Thornton | Jack | Hindi | English | 2011 | 2011 | Hindi dub released theatrically and also for home media releases and television airings. Parminder's name was mentioned on the Hindi dub credits. |
| Transformers Prime Beast Hunters: Predacons Rising | Frank Welker | Megatron | Hindi | English | 2013 | 2013 | Television film |
| Zootopia | Tom Lister Jr. | Finnick | Hindi | English | 2016 | 2017 | Official Hindi dub made by Blue Whale Entertainment and Disney Character Voices International and premiered on Movies OK on 17 September 2017. |

== See also ==
- Dubbing (filmmaking)
- List of Indian dubbing artists
