= Venkat Bharadwaj =

Indian film director

- Occupations: Director, producer, screenwriter, actor
- Years active: 2015–present
- Parent: C. V. Shivashankar (father)

Venkat Bharadwaj is an Indian film director, producer, screenwriter and actor who predominately works in Kannada-language films. He is best known for the film Kempiruve (2017) for which he won the Karnataka State Film Award for Best Screenplay.

== Career ==
Venkat Bharadwaj worked a regional manager of Starcom when an incident that happened on Church Street, Bangalore motivated him to make the indie film titled A Day in the City. Scriptwriting with him and his friends began in August 2013. Filming began on 8 January 2014 and finished on 13 May 2014. Since the film was shot on the weekends, ninety-percent of the cast was IT professional apart from Kappanna and Malayalam actor Sridharan. The film was shot for twelve hours a day and the actors were mailed their lines beforehand. The four songs were shot at Brigade Road and M G Road in Bangalore, Maddur, Mahadevapura, Mandya and Srirangapatna. The film is about water scarcity in a big city and how important government officials and engineers try to solve the issue. The film was screened at British Airways, China Air and Emirates amongst other airlines. His next film was the historical drama Bablusha (2016), for which he selected 3 candidates from 480 people who auditioned for the three lead roles. His next film Kempiruve delved into the lives of senior citizens and the challenges they face. His 2019 documentary Leap of Faith is based on suicidal people who decided to not take their lives and also covered attempted suicides by children. His film Omelette (2021) was based on an auto driver's aspirations in life. The film's story was conceived in September 2019 and the film's post-production work was wrapped by January 2020. The film did not have a theatrical release and opted for a direct television release due to the COVID-19 pandemic. The film Naguvina Hoogala Mele (2024) marked his foray into the romantic action genre. His last release was the patriotic film Hyena (2025).

== Personal life ==
He is the elder son of Kannada film industry veteran C. V. Shivashankar. His brother Karthik Urs worked as an actor in A Day in the City and Kempiruve (2017), the latter of which he also co-wrote the story and dialogues.

== Filmography ==
Year	Film	Director	Writer	Producer	Actor	Notes
2015	A Day in the City (Nagaradalli Ondu Dina)	Yes	Yes	No	Yes	
2016	Bablusha	Yes	Yes	No	No	
2017	Kempiruve	Yes	No	No	No	
2019	Unarvu	Yes	Yes	No	Yes	Tamil film
2019	Leap of Faith	Yes	Yes	No	No	English film
2019	Alidu Ulidavaru	No	No	No	Yes	
2020	The Painter	Yes	Yes	Yes	Yes	
2021	Omelette	Yes	Yes	No	Yes	
2022	Sri Ranga	Yes	Yes	No	No	
2024	Naguvina Hoogala Mele	Yes	Yes	No	No	
2025	Hyena	Yes	Yes	No	Yes	
2025	Hey Prabhu	Yes	Yes	Yes	Yes	
