= Vajrang Shetty =

Indian Kannada actor

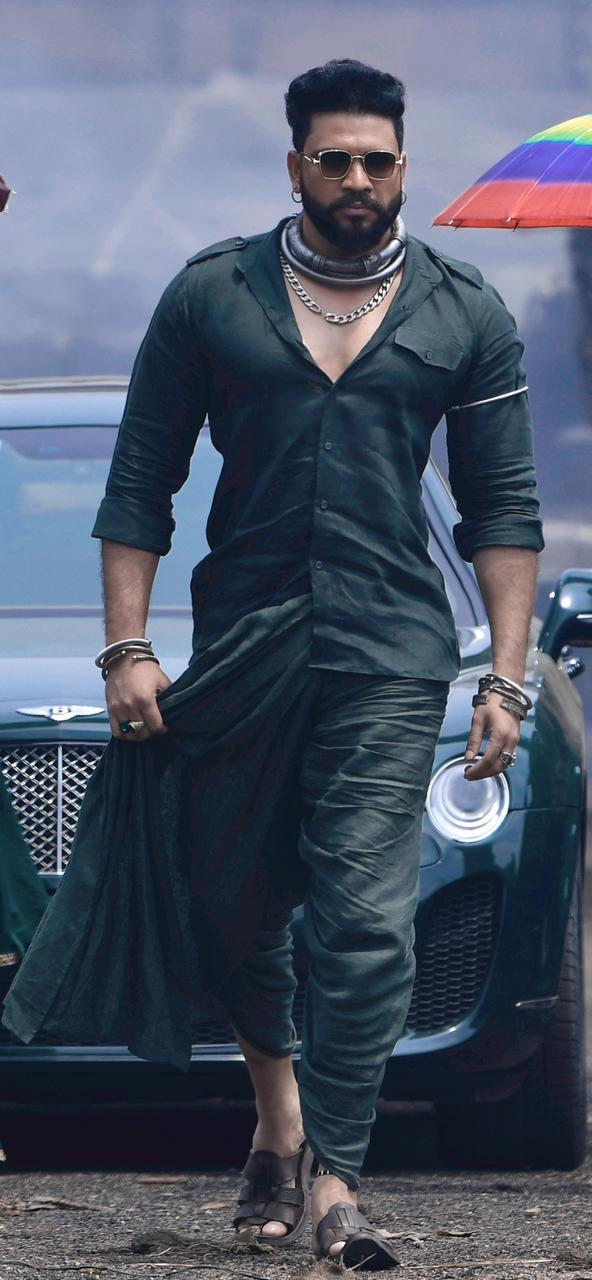
- Vajrang Shetty in Salaar: Part 1 – Ceasefire
- Born: Mani Shetty; 31 July 1990 (age 36); Thekkatte, Karnataka, India
- Other name: Shamanth Shetty
- Occupation: Actor
- Years active: 2015–present

Vajrang Shetty (born 31 July 1990), also known by his birth name Mani Shetty, is an Indian film actor who works primarily in Kannada cinema. Vajrang starred as the lead actor in the horror film Mantram.

== Early life ==
Vajrang hails from a middle-class Bunt Family. His father is a farmer. He did his primary and high-school education in Government School of Thekkatte, Kundapur, Karnataka. He completed his Pre-University education at Viveka Junior College, Kota, Udupi District, and obtained his Bachelor's Degree from Tunga Mahavidyalaya Thirthahalli. He was also titled as Coondapur.com's Mr. Kundapura in the year 2014.

Vajrang started his career from Siddhartha, as the villain, and also played the villain in Bablusha. Regarding his performance in the latter film, a critic noted that "Mani Shetty, the antagonist, is particularly impressive, with his physique, acting skills and emotions and shows promise".

== Filmography ==
Key
†	Denotes films that have not yet been released

Year	Film	Role	Notes	Ref.
2015	Siddhartha	Jani		
2015	Namak Haraam	Venu		
2016	Bablusha	Bablusha		
2016	Madha Mathu Manasi	Deepak		
2017	Uppu Huli Khara	Bukki		
2017	Mantram	Sanju		
2018	Kiss			
2018	Kinare	Robert		
2019	Yajamana			
2019	99			
2021	Roberrt			
2022	James	Prathap Aras's son		
2023	Salaar: Part 1 – Ceasefire	Vishnu	Telugu debut	
2024	Marigold			
2024	Martin	Munna		
TBA	Burma †			
