= Marainthirunthu Paarkum Marmam Enna =

2018 film

- Poster
- Directed by: R. Rahesh
- Written by: R. Rahesh
- Screenplay by: R. Rahesh
- Produced by: V. Madhiazhagan; R. Ramya
- Starring: Dhruvva; Aishwarya Dutta; Anjana Prem; Saranya Ponvannan
- Cinematography: P. G. Muthiah
- Edited by: San Lokesh
- Music by: Achu Rajamani
- Production company: Etcetera Entertainment
- Release date: 17 August 2018
- Running time: 115 minutes
- Country: India
- Language: Tamil

Marainthirunthu Paarkum Marmam Enna (transl. What is the mystery behind watching in secret?) is a 2018 Indian Tamil-language thriller drama film written and directed by R. Raheshe. The film stars Dhruvva, Aishwarya Dutta, Anjana Prem, Saranya Ponvannan in the main lead roles while J. D. Chakravarthy, Radha Ravi, Manobala play supportive roles in the film. P. G. Muthiah serves as the cinematographer for the film. The music for the film is composed by Achu Rajamani. The film underwent censorship issues before its theatrical release on 17 August 2018. The film received average reviews from the audience upon the release.

== Plot ==
Japan (Dhruvva) is a cylinder delivery boy who intrudes into the chain smuggling gang to get to know the people behind the death of his dear ones. The flashback shows Japan's real name is Aiyappan who lives with his mother. He feels loves with Bharathi and get married. Unfortunately, he loses his wife due to chain smuggling and his mother severely injured. How Aiyappan avenged the destruction of his loved ones.

== Cast ==
- Dhruvva as Japan (Aiyappan)
- Aishwarya Dutta as Bharathi, a North Chennai-based girl
- Anjana Prem as Japan's wife
- Saranya Ponvannan as Japan's mother
- Radha Ravi
- J. D. Chakravarthy as Dilip Chakravarthy
- Manobala
- Aruldoss
- Mime Gopi as Mattai
- Ramachandran Durairaj as Jeeva
- Nagineedu
- Raviraj

== Production ==
The film commenced its production venture in late 2015 with R. Rakesh making his second directorial venture through this project after Thagadu Thagadu. The movie also initially marked the debut production venture of popular Tamil film cinematographer P. G. Muthiah. However the cinematographer-turned-producer was replaced by V. Mathiyalagan due to financial problems. The film was adapted as a female-centric one and was based on female oriented story related to chain stealing which is considered as a usual aspect in Tamil Nadu.

The title of the film Maraindhirunthu Paarkum Marmam Enna was inspired from a popular song which was part of the 1968 Tamil film Thillana Mohanambal.

The film also begins with the motto says 'true independence is when a woman can walk on the street with wearing jewelleries at midnight without the fear of being attacked and without being afraid about chain theft'.

The filming of the movie was shot in areas including Ennore and Vysarpadi with the production being completed in around 2017. However the release of the film was delayed on numerous occasions due to the censorship issues.

The trailer of the film was launched and released on 23 June 2018 by film directors Venkat Prabhu and Jayam Raja.

== Soundtrack ==
The music for the film is scored by Achu Rajamani and lyrics are penned by popular lyricist Pa. Vijay and lyricist Pa.Meenachisundaram. The film consists of four songs.

Marainthirunthu Paarkum Marmam Enna (Original Motion Picture Soundtrack)

Soundtrack album by Achu Rajamani
- Released: 9 July 2018
- Genre: Feature film soundtrack
- Label: Saregama

Achu Rajamani chronology
Goli Soda 2 (2018)	Marainthirunthu Paarkum Marmam Enna (Original Motion Picture Soundtrack) (2018)	Mugam (TBD)

Soundtrack
No.	Title	Lyrics	Music	Singer(s)	Length
1.	"Sangili Bungili Attukku Buttukku"	Pa.Vijay	Achu Rajamani		3:23
2.	"Enakku Ennachu"	Pa.Vijay	Achu Rajamani	Ala B Bala	3:15
3.	"Thirudathey"	Pa.Vijay	Achu Rajamani		3:57
4.	"Uruvaan Churukku"	Pa.Meenachisundaram	Achu Rajamani	Jithin Raj; Sreelaksmy Menon	4:24
