= Kempiruve =

2017 Indian Kannada-language drama film

- Promotional poster
- Directed by: Venkat Bharadwaj
- Written by: Venkat Bharadwaj; Karthik Urs (unc.)
- Starring: H. G. Dattatreya; Sayaji Shinde; Laxman Shivashankar; Shreyas
- Music by: Nadhu Jabezz
- Release date: 17 November 2017
- Running time: 127 minutes
- Country: India
- Language: Kannada

Kempiruve (transl. Red ants) is a 2017 Indian Kannada-language drama film directed by Venkat Bharadwaj and co-written by Karthik Urs, a senior manager at Capgemini. The film stars H. G. Dattatreya as Venkatesh Murthy, a retired middle-class man, alongside Sayaji Shinde, Umesh Banekar, Laxman Shivashankar, and Shreyas. Set in Bengaluru, it explores the struggles of the middle class against the real estate mafia, using the metaphor of red ants to depict the resilience of ordinary people. Released on 17 November 2017, the film received the Karnataka State Film Award for Best Screenplay in 2017.

== Plot ==
Venkatesh Murthy, a 65-year-old retired middle-class widower in south Bengaluru, is disrespected by his son and daughter-in-law, who view him as a financial burden. After losing his provident fund and his late wife's savings to theft, he spends his days with friends at a park, where his wisdom draws the attention of Damu (Umesh Banekar) and his boss Naidu (Laxman Shivashankar), who run a real estate agency. Initially lured into their business for money, Venkatesh uncovers unethical practices and resists the real estate mafia, highlighting the exploitation of the middle class. The story emphasizes the power of ordinary people, likened to red ants overpowering an elephant.

== Cast ==
- H. G. Dattatreya as Venkatesh Murthy, a retired middle-class widower
- Sayaji Shinde as a politician
- Umesh Banekar as Damu, a real estate agency worker
- Laxman Shivashankar as Naidu, a real estate agency boss
- Shreyas

== Production ==
Directed by Venkat Bharadwaj, known for addressing urban issues in films like A Day in the City, Kempiruve was written by Karthik Urs, a Bengaluru-based tech professional making his debut in Kannada cinema. The film was crafted to reflect the realities of Bengaluru’s middle class and the real estate sector’s impact on senior citizens. Sayaji Shinde was cast as a politician, a role distinct from Dattanna’s central character, with no shared scenes between them.

== Release and reception ==
Kempiruve was released on 17 November 2017, despite warnings from the Karnataka Film Chamber of Commerce about a crowded release schedule. It had its world television premiere on 5 August 2018. The film received mixed reviews. The New Indian Express praised its realistic portrayal of middle-class life and strong performances, particularly by Dattanna and Laxman Shivashankar, noting its universal appeal. The Times of India rated it 3/5, commending the engaging second half and performances but criticizing a slow first half and technical flaws like uneven camerawork. Bangalore Mirror described it as a "worn-out drama" that fluctuated between quality and mediocrity. Udayavani appreciated its social commentary, likening the middle class to volatile red ants.
