= Bablusha =

- Film poster
- Directed by: Venkat Bharadwaj
- Written by: Venkat Bharadwaj
- Produced by: C. V. Shivashankar
- Starring: Harsh Arjun; Mani Shetty; Mrudhula Bhaskar
- Cinematography: Vishwajith B. Rao
- Edited by: Akshay P. Rao
- Music by: Sunny Madhavan; Nandu Jabez
- Production company: Amrutha Film Center
- Release dates: August 26, 2016 (USA); September 2, 2016 (India)
- Running time: 128 min
- Country: India
- Language: Kannada

Bablusha (Kannada: ಬಬ್ಲುಷ) is a 2016 Indian Kannada-language historical drama film written and directed by Venkat Bharadwaj. It stars Harsh Arjun, Mani Shetty, Mrudhula Bhaskar (in her Kannada debut), and Baby Shamaa, with Avinash, Shobaraj, Raj Kamal, Paramesh, Srikanth Heblikar, Shantala Bhandi, and Lawrence Pritam as supporting cast.

Bablusha is a historical family thriller. It is based on a true story involving a family in Mallinathapura in the year 1501 during the times of Krishnadevaraya. The film was released to mixed reviews.

== Cast ==
- Harsh Arjun
- Mani Shetty
- Mrudhula Bhaskar
- Baby Shamaa
- Paramesh
- Avinash
- Shobaraj
- Raj Kamal
- Srikanth Heblikar
- Shantala Bhandi
- Shantakumari
- Sriharsha Neergundha

== Production ==
After the success of A Day in the City, Bharadwaj was approached by an NRI to come up with a historical film. Venkat accepted the opportunity and created Bablusha. Venkat selected three of the 480 candidates who auditioned for the lead role. The film was shot within 24 days in Kanakapura, Malavalli, Mallinathapur village, and Ramnagara.

== Soundtrack ==
Bablusha

Soundtrack album by Sunny Madhavan
- Released: 2016
- Genre: Feature film soundtrack
- Label: Trends Music

Tracklist
No.	Title	Lyrics	Singer(s)	Length
1.	"Dhanna Dhan"	Shantakumari	Humble Shine
2.	"Kusti Aadu"	Vinay Shastry	Pradeep, Venkat Bharadwaj
3.	"Eeonti Jeevan"	Mahesh	Vimal. P.K
4.	"Ramana Bhakt"	Mahesh	Sunil

== Reception ==
A critic from The Times of India rated the film two-and-a-half out of five stars and wrote that "This film does remind one of childhood tales like Hansel and Gretel and Red Riding Hood. If you want to watch a film that would entertain your little one and also make a decent watch for you, then this can be a good choice". A critic from The News Minute wrote that "In the end, one comes out of the film feeling cheated - that what was promised, was not delivered. And wondering what might have been, if only the director had stuck to his original premise".
