= CMR University =

Private university in Bengaluru, India

Coordinates: 13.0192°N 77.6422°E

- Motto: Swan taking flight
- Type: Private
- Established: 2013
- Affiliations: UGC; AIU
- Chancellor: Sabitha Ramamurthy
- Vice-Chancellor: M. S. Shivakumar
- Administrative staff: Faculty
- Location: Bangalore, Karnataka, India
- Campus: Urban
- Website: cmr.edu.in

CMR University is a private university located in Bangalore, Karnataka, India. CMR University (CMRU) has been established and is governed by the CMR University Act of 2013. CMRU offers programs in law, technical, health, management, life sciences and other allied sectors of higher and professional education. CMR University is also recognized by AIU.

== History ==
CMR University is a private university located in Bangalore, Karnataka, India. CMR University (CMRU) has been established and is governed by the CMR University Act of 2013.

== Academics ==
There are various programs under any disciplines:-

- School of Architecture
- School of Design
- School of Economics and Commerce
- School of Legal Studies
- School of Engineering & Technology
- School of Management
- School of Allied & Healthcare Sciences
- School of Science & Computer Studies

== Campuses ==
- CMRU OMBR campus, 5, Chikka Banaswadi Rd, Bhuvanagiri, Lakshmamma Layout, Banaswadi, Bengaluru
- CMRU City Campus, HRBR Layout Block 2, Kalyan Nagar, Bangalore
- CMRU Main Campus, off Hennur-Bagalur Road, Bangalore.
- CMRIT IT campus,132 Aecs Layout, Itpl Main Road, Kundalahalli, Bengaluru

== Affiliation ==
Like all universities in India, CMR University, Bangalore is recognised by the University Grants Commission (UGC). The University is also a recognised member of Association of Indian Universities.

== Rankings ==
College rankings

Law – India
- Private colleges
- Outlook India (2022): 10

Its constituent college CMR University School of Legal Studies (formerly CMR Law School) was ranked tenth in Outlook India's "Top 30 Private Law Colleges In India" of 2022.

== Notable alumni ==
- Vellaswamy Vanitha, cricketer
