= Kadhal Kasakuthaiya =

2017 Indian film by Dwarakh Raja

- Release poster
- Directed by: Dwarakh Raja
- Written by: Dwarakh Raja
- Story by: Dwarakh Raja
- Produced by: V. Mathiyalagan; R. Ramya
- Starring: Dhruvva; Venba
- Cinematography: Balaji Subramaniam
- Edited by: Muniez
- Music by: Dharan Kumar
- Production company: Etcetera Entertainment
- Release date: 8 September 2017
- Country: India
- Language: Tamil

Kadhal Kasakuthaiya (transl. Love Feels Bitter) is a 2017 Indian Tamil-language romantic drama film written and directed by Dwarakh Raja. Featuring Dhruvva and Venba in the lead roles, the film also has veteran actors Charle and Kalpana in pivotal roles. The film began production in mid-2016 and was released on 8 September 2017 to mixed reviews from critics.

== Plot ==
The film begins with Diya, a seventeen-year-old girl, studying in high school. Diya is an only child. Diya's father is very fond of her. Diya goes to school by cycle with her friend Patricia. Arjun is a twenty-five-year-old software engineer. Diya sees Arjun and is impressed by his smoking. Diya gets Arjun's number and calls him. Diya asks Arjun to meet him. Arjun agrees to meet her. Arjun gets shocked when he sees Diya. A short school-going girl comes and proposes to him. After a few days, they meet again. Arjun is impressed and proposes to her. Arjun's friends scold him for having an affair with a schoolgirl. A schoolboy who has a crush on Diya learns about Arjun-Diya's love. The schoolboy is angered. One day Arjun buys a new dress for Diya. He calls Diya to come to his home and try the new dress. After school, Diya goes to Arjun's house. While Diya is in Arjun's house the schoolboy calls Diya's father and tells him that Diya is in Arjun's house. Diya's father comes to Arjun's house and is angered to see Diya there. Diya's father scolds her. Arjun leaves the town and leaves for another place. Diya is heartbroken. Patricia asks Arjun's friends about Arjun. They said that they didn't know where he went. After a few days, Arjun's mother wakes up from a coma. Diya couldn't do anything except think of Arjun. Arjun's mother learns of her son's affair with Diya. She agrees to his love. Arjun's mother says that it is not a problem to love a young girl and says that she was Diya's age when she got married.

Then Diya and Arjun don't meet each other. After a few days, Diya faces the public examination, so she is focused and concentrated only on her studies. Here Arjun realizes that through he and Diya's bonding, he started loving Diya. He meets Diya and proposes to her; also he wishes her to do well on all her exams. She accepts him. Her exams are over, and Diya wrote very well in all the exams. Then she completed her school life and entered college. There, Arjun and Diya love each other.

After many years, Diya and Arjun got married in front of their families.

== Cast ==
- Dhruvva as Arjun
- Venba as Diya
- Charle as Diya's father
- Kalpana as Arjun's mother
- Deepa Nethran as Diya's mother
- Vaishali Taniga as Patricia
- Linga as Vivek
- Jayaganesh
- Shivam
- Navin Gj

== Production ==
The film's director, Dwarakh, a visual communication graduate who has made short films, stated "the film which he says cannot be classified under a particular genre" and that "the story revolves around the romance between an 18-year-old girl and a 25-year-old boy". The film had its origin as a short film titled Maalai Neram, but Dwarakh later expanded that into a film. Dhruvva of Thilagar (2015) fame and Venba, who portrayed the younger version of Anjali's character in Kattradhu Thamizh (2007), were signed to play the lead pair. Dwarakh completed scripting the film in a mere 10 days, and wrapped up the shoot in 24 days.

== Soundtrack ==
Kadhal Kasukuthaiya

Soundtrack album by Dharan Kumar
- Released: 2017
- Recorded: 23 August 2017
- Language: Tamil
- Label: Music 247
- Producers: V. Mathiyalagan; R. Ramya

Dharan Kumar chronology
| Manal Kayiru 2 (2016) | Kadhal Kasukuthaiya (2017) | Abhiyum Anuvum (2018) |

The film's music was composed by Dharan Kumar, while the audio rights of the film was acquired by Music 247. The album released on 23 August 2017 and featured six tracks.

Track list
| No. | Title | Lyrics | Singer(s) | Length |
|---|---|---|---|---|
| 1. | "Complan Boy" | Dwarakh Raja | Dharan Kumar, M. M. Monissha | 4:42 |
| 2. | "Hello Arjun" | Dwarakh Raja | Harini | 4:14 |
| 3. | "Amma Chellam" | Dwarakh Raja | Maalavika Sundar | 4:42 |
| 4. | "Veyil Vandhal" | Dwarakh Raja | Anisha Chandy | 1:20 |
| 5. | "Dusk Dawns (Theme Song)" | — | — | 2:31 |
| 6. | "Complan Boy (Theme Song)" | — | — | 1:49 |

== Release ==
The film opened on 8 September 2017 to mixed reviews, with the critic from The Times of India giving the film a negative review and stating "the writing seems unable to maintain a rhythm resulting in an uneven film that is engaging only in bit and parts". The film was later dubbed and released in Telugu as Heart Beat on 19 January 2018.
