= Saamaniyan =

2024 Indian Tamil-language film

- Theatrical release poster
- Directed by: R. Rakesh
- Story by: V. Karthik kumar
- Produced by: Mathiyalagan V
- Starring: Ramarajan; Radha Ravi; M. S. Bhaskar
- Cinematography: Arulchelvan
- Edited by: Ram Gopi
- Music by: Ilaiyaraaja
- Production company: Etcetera Entertainment
- Release date: 23 May 2024
- Country: India
- Language: Tamil

Saamaniyan (transl. Common man) is a 2024 Indian Tamil-language vigilante film Story by v. karthik kumar and directed by R. Rahesh and produced by Etcetera Entertainment. The film stars Ramarajan, Radha Ravi and M. S. Bhaskar. It began production in late 2022 and ended in early 2023. The film was released in theatres on 23 May 2024.

== Plot ==
Sankara Narayanan and his friend Mookaiah from a village in Mellur side of Madurai district come as guests to their friend Fazil Bhai's house in Chennai. The next day, Sankara Narayanan, who goes to a bank in Thiagarayar, threatens with a bomb and a pistol and takes control. He takes the bank employees and customers hostage.

== Cast ==
- Ramarajan as Sankara Narayanan
- Radha Ravi as Fazil Bhai
- M. S. Bhaskar as Mookaiah
- K. S. Ravikumar as Murugavel
- Bose Venkat as Bank Manager Adhithyan
- Mime Gopi as Pazhani
- Saravana Subbiah as Punniyavan
- Naksha Saran as Dhivya
- Leo Sivakumar as Alagar
- Vinodhini Vaidyanathan as Gayathri
- Deepa Shankar as Lakshmi
- Smruthi Venkat as Aparna
- Abarnathi as Manisha
- Aranthangi Nisha as Kanaga
- Saravana Sakthi as Ponmudi
- Gajaraj as Police Inspector
- Mullai
- Arul Mani
- Kothandam
- Supergood Subramani

== Production ==
Saamaniyan marks the acting comeback of Ramarajan after 12 years and it is his 45th film as an actor. Ramarajan sported a bearded look for the first time in his acting career. Filming began in late 2022, and wrapped in January 2023.

== Soundtrack ==
The soundtrack is composed by Ilaiyaraaja, reuniting with Ramarajan after 23 years.

Track listing
| No. | Title | Singer(s) | Length |
|---|---|---|---|
| 1. | "Thatti Vaa" | Ilaiyaraaja |
| 2. | "Oli Veesum" | Karthik |
| 3. | "Kannana Kanne" | Sharreth |

== Release ==
Saamaniyan was released in theatres on 23 May 2024. In 2023, Viyan Aarman, the owner of Art Addict, filed a petition seeking a ban on the release of the film under the name Saamaniyan, saying he registered the title in 2012 and was continually renewing it since; however, the Madras High Court dismissed his plea.

== Reception ==
Manigandan KR of Times Now rated three out of five star and noted that "Saamaniyan is a reasonably good drama that succeeds in its mission of making some significant points." Sreejith Mullappilly of Cinema Express rated two out of five star and stated that "In the end, Saamaniyan is a film with a promising premise that drowns under the weight of its own plot and heavy-handed messaging." Ananda Vikatan gave the film a mixed review.
