= Samay Raj Thakkar =

Indian voice artist

- Born: 21 March 1966 (age 60); Mumbai, Maharashtra, India
- Occupations: Actor, voice actor

Samay Raj Thakkar (born 21 March 1966) is an Indian actor and voice actor who specialises in dubbing foreign media in the Hindi language.

== Filmography ==
=== Animated films ===
Title	Character	Language	Year release	Notes
Veer Yodha Prithviraj Chauhan	Additional Voice	Hindi	2008	
Bal Ganesh 2	Lord Shiva	Hindi	2009	
Bal Ganesh 3	Lord Shiva	Hindi	2015	

=== Animated series ===
Title	Character	Language	Airdate	Notes
Baahubali: The Lost Legends	Kattappa	Hindi; English	2017–2020	
Baahubali: Crown of Blood	Kattappa	Hindi	2024	

=== Television ===
Title	Character	Language	Airdate	Notes
CID	Various characters	Hindi	1998–2018	He dubbed for Dayanand Shetty in some of the episodes as well as played episodic roles in some of the episodes.

== Dubbing career ==
He is the Hindi dubbing voice of Christian Bale and Ben Affleck's role as Bruce Wayne / Batman in the Christopher Nolan's Batman reboot trilogy. He also voiced Arnold Schwarzenegger roles in all of his films as well.

== Dubbing roles ==
=== Live action series ===
Title	Actor	Character	Dub language	Original language	Number of episodes	Original airdate	Dubbed airdate	Notes
Goosebumps	Unknown actor	Unknown character	Hindi	English	74	10/27/1995-11/16/1998	5/15/2006-2009	
CID	Dayanand Shetty	Senior Inspector Daya	Hindi			1/21/1998-10/27/2018		
Luke Cage	Frank Whaley	Rafael Scarfe	Hindi	English	26	2016 – present		
Stranger Things	David Harbour	Jim Hopper	Hindi	English	25	2016 – present		
Game of Thrones	Sean Bean	Eddard "Ned" Stark	Hindi	English	73	2011 – 2019		
Titans	Esai Morales	Slade Wilson / Deathstroke	Hindi	English	24	2018–present	2019–present	
The Boys (Season 3)	Karl Urban	Billy Butcher	Hindi	English	8	2022	2022	
FUBAR	Arnold Schwarzenegger	Luke Brunner	Hindi	English	8	2023	2023	

=== Animated series ===
Title	Original voice	Character	Dub language	Original language	Number of episodes	Original airdate	Dubbed airdate	Notes
Super Robot Monkey Team Hyperforce Go!	Jeffrey Combs	Gyrus Krinkle	Hindi	English	52 (dubbed 2)	18 September 2004 – 16 December 2006		
Spider-Man and His Amazing Friends	Dan Gilvezan	Peter Parker / Spider-Man	Hindi	English	65	09/12/1981-09/10/1983		
Spider-Man	Christopher Daniel Barnes	Peter Parker / Spider-Man	Hindi	English	65	11/19/1994-1/31/1998		
Justice League Unlimited	George Newbern	Clark Kent/Superman	Hindi	English	39	07/31/2004- 5/13/2006		
Ultimate Spider-Man	Roger Craig Smith	Steve Rogers / Captain America	Hindi	English	2	1/04/2012- Present		
Phineas and Ferb	Richard O'Brien	Lawrence Fletcher	Hindi	English	222	2007–2015	2008–2015	
Transformers: Prime	Daran Norris	Knock Out	Hindi	English	65	29 November 2010 – 26 July 2013		
Love, Death & Robots	Nolan North	Ugly Dave	Hindi	English	18 (dubbed 1)	15 March 2019 – present		
Transformers: War for Cybertron Trilogy	Frank Todaro	Starscream	Hindi	English	18	30 July 2020 – 29 July 2021	30 July 2020 – 29 July 2021	
Batman: Caped Crusader	Toby Stephens	Russell Craddock	Hindi	English	10 (dubbed 1)	1 August 2024	1 August 2024	

=== Live action films ===
==== Indian films ====
Title	Actor	Character	Dub language	Original language	Original year release	Dub year release	Notes
Chandramukhi 2	Suresh Chandra Menon	Ranganayaki's elder brother	Hindi	Tamil	2023	2023	
777 Charlie	H. G. Somashekar Rao †	A tea stall owner	Hindi	Kannada	2022	2022	
Avane Srimannarayana	Pramod Shetty	Tukaram, Jayarama's rival	Hindi	Kannada	2019	2019	The Hindi dub was titled: Adventures of Srimannarayana.
Mukunda Murari	'Kichcha' Sudeep Sanjeeva	Krishna, Murari	Hindi	Telugu	2016	Unknown	
Golimaar	Prakash Raj	D.I.G. Prakash	Hindustani	Telugu	2010	2021	
Half Girlfriend	Unknown Actor	Riya's Father	Hindi		2017		
Saaho	Devan	IG Devan Varma	Hindi	Telugu	2019		
Murder 2	Unknown actor	A minister who orders the commissioner to release Dheeraj	Hindi		2011		
Munjya	Sathyaraj	Padri Elvis Karim Prabhakar	Hindi		2024		
Radhe Shyam	Sathyaraj	Paramahamsa	Hindi	Telugu	2022		
Anniyan	'Chiyaan' Vikram	P. Ramanujam Iyengar "Ambi" / Anniyan (Aparichit in Hindi version) / Remo	Hindi	Tamil	2005	2006	
Balram vs. Tharadas	Mammootty	DYSP Balram / Tharadas (Basha in Hindi version)	Hindi	Malayalam	2006	2006	
Vikram	Chemban Vinod Jose	Inspector Jose	Hindi	Tamil	2022		
Andhrudu	Gopichand Tottempudi	Surendra	Hindi	Telugu	2005	2006	
Manasuku Nachindi	Ghattamaneni Mahesh Babu	Narrator	Hindi	Telugu	2018	2020	
Balu ABCDEFG	'Pawan' Kalyan Babu Konidela	Ghani/Balu (Balraj)	Hindi	Telugu	2005	2006	
Bodyguard	Venkatesh Daggubati	Bodyguard Venky	Hindi	Telugu	2012	2012	
Ranam	Biju Menon	Bhagwati	Hindi	Telugu	2006	2007	
Student No. 1	Jr. N.T.R.	Aditya	Hindi	Telugu	2001	2007	
Subash Chandra Bose	Venkatesh Daggubati	Subash Chandra Bose alias Chandram / Ashok	Hindi	Telugu	2005	2007	
Sainikudu	Ghattamaneni Mahesh Babu	Siddharth	Hindi	Telugu	2006	2008	
Yamadonga	M.S. Narayana †	Costume "Boss"	Hindi	Telugu	2007	2008	
Lakshyam	Jagapathi Babu	A.C.P. Bose	Hindi	Telugu	2007	2008	
Lakshyam	Jagapathi Babu	A.C.P. Bose	Hindi	Telugu	2007	2022	
Chatrapathi	Prabhas	Sivaji / Chatrapathi	Hindi	Telugu	2005	2009	
Chatrapathi	Narendra Jha †	Baji Rao	Hindi	Telugu	2005	2021	
Sri Anjaneyam	Prakash Raj	Anji's father	Hindi	Telugu	2004	2009	
Sri Anjaneyam	L.B. Sriram	Padma's father	Hindi	Telugu	2004	2009	
Drona	Nithin Reddy	Drona / Chandu	Hindi	Telugu	2009	2009	
Jayam	Gopichand Tottempudi	Raghu	Hindi	Telugu	2002	2010	
Pokiri	Prakash Raj	Ali Bhai	Hindi	Telugu	2006	2010	
King	Akkineni Nagarjuna	King / Bottu Seenu (Raghu Rokda in Hindi version) / Sharath	Hindi	Telugu	2008	2010	
Enthiran	Unknown actor	Police officer	Hindi	Tamil	2010	2010	
Homam	Jagapathi Babu	Mallikarjuna alias Malli	Hindi	Telugu	2008	2010	
Victory	Ashutosh Rana	MLA Devraj	Hindi	Telugu	2008	2010	
Ragada	Akkineni Nagarjuna	Satya Reddy	Hindi	Telugu	2010	2011	
Simha	Nandamuri Balakrishna	Srimannarayana (Veersimha in Hindi version) / Dr. Narsimha (dual role)	Hindi	Telugu	2010	2011	
Kanthaswamy	'Chiyaan' Vikram	Kanthaswamy IPS	Hindi	Tamil	2009	2018	
Mallanna	'Chiyaan' Vikram	Kanthaswamy IPS	Hindi	Telugu	2009	2011	
Ji	Ajith Kumar	Vasu	Hindi	Tamil	2005	2012	
Samanyudu	Jagapathi Babu	Chandra	Hindi	Telugu	2006	2012	
Dookudu	Unknown actor	Narrator	Hindi	Telugu	2011	2012	
Dookudu	Suman Talwar	Police Commissioner Ramprasad D.	Hindi	Telugu	2011	2012	
Dookudu	Nagendra Babu Konidela	Police Commissioner Surya Prakash	Hindi	Telugu	2011	2012	
Aegan	Ajith Kumar	Shiva	Hindi	Tamil	2008	2012	
Aptharakshaka	Vishnuvardhan †	Dr. Vijay / Vijay Rajendra Bahadur	Hindi	Kannada	2010	2012	
Oosaravelli	Murali Sharma	Local Don	Hindi	Telugu	2011	2012	
Kuruvi	Ashish Vidyarthi	Konda Reddy	Hindi	Tamil	2008	2012	
Athadu	Rahul Dev	Sadhu	Hindi	Telugu	2005	2013	
Dhada	Rahul Dev	R.D.	Hindi	Telugu	2011	2013	
Varadhanayaka	'Kichcha' Sudeepa Sanjeeva	Varadanayaka (Varun Nayak in Hindi version)	Hindi	Kannada	2013	2013	
Attarintiki Daredi	'Pawan' Kalyan Babu Konidela	Gautham Nanda / Siddartha "Siddhu"	Hindi	Telugu	2013	2013	
Intlo Illalu Vantintlo Priyuralu	Venkatesh Daggubati	Sriram	Hindi	Telugu	1996	2013	
Kotha Bangaru Lokam	Prakash Raj	Balu's father	Hindi	Telugu	2008	2013	
Ainthu Ainthu Ainthu	Sudesh Berry	Chitranjan	Hindi	Tamil	2013	2013	
Daruvu	Sushant Singh	Harbour Babu	Hindi	Telugu	2012	2013	
Bhai	Akkineni Nagarjuna	Bhai / Vijay	Hindi	Telugu	2013	2014	
Naayak	Rahul Dev	Babji	Hindi	Telugu	2013	2014	
Bachchan	Jagapathi Babu	Vijayakumar	Hindi	Kannada	2013	2014	
Takkari Donga	Rahul Dev	Shakeel aka Shaka	Hindi	Telugu	2002	2014	
Legend	Nandamuri Balakrishna	Jaidev (Legend) & Krishna	Hindi	Telugu	2014	2014	
Iddarammayilatho	Shawar Ali	Shawar Ali	Hindi	Telugu	2013	2014	
Bhajarangi	Shiva Rajkumar	Bhajarangi / Jeeva	Hindi	Kannada	2013	2014	
Adhinayakudu	Nandamuri Balakrishna	Harishchandra Prasad / Rama Krishna Prasad / Bobby	Hindi	Telugu	2012	2014	
Greeku Veerudu	Akkineni Nagarjuna	Chandu	Hindi	Telugu	2013	2014	
Billa II	Ajith Kumar	David Billa	Hindi	Tamil	2012	2014	
Billa II	Yog Japee	Ranjith	Hindi	Tamil	2012	2021	
Vedam	Manoj Bajpayee	Rahimuddin Qureshi	Hindi	Telugu	2010	2014	
Key	Jagapathi Babu	Invigilator	Hindi	Telugu	2011	2014	
Lion	Nandamuri Balakrishna	Godse / Bose	Hindi	Telugu	2015	2015	
Seethamma Vakitlo Sirimalle Chettu	Narrator		Hindi	Telugu	2013	2015	
Yevadu	Rahul Dev	Veeru Bhai	Hindi	Telugu	2014	2015	
Happy	Manoj Bajpayee	DCP Arvind	Hindi	Telugu	2006	2015	
I	Suresh Gopi	Dr. Vasudevan	Hindi	Tamil	2015	2015	
Baahubali: The Beginning	Sathyaraj	Kattappa	Hindi	Telugu	2015	2015	
Baahubali: The Beginning	Sathyaraj	Kattappa	Hindi	Telugu	2015	2021	
Srimannarayana	Nandamuri Balakrishna	Srimannarayana	Hindi	Telugu	2012	2015	
Maanikya	'Kichcha' Sudeepa Sanjeeva	Vijay	Hindi	Kannada	2014	2015	
Uu Kodathara? Ulikki Padathara?	Nandamuri Balakrishna	Rudramaneni Narasimha Rayudu	Hindi	Telugu	2012	2015	
Loukyam	Rahul Dev	Sathya	Hindi	Telugu	2014	2015	
Okkadu	Prakash Raj	Obul Reddy	Hindi	Telugu	2003	2015	
Chandee	Krishnam Raju	Ashok Gajapati Raju (Ashok Shastri in Hindi version)	Hindi	Telugu	2013	2015	
RajadhiRaja	Mammootty	Shekharan Kutty	Hindi	Malayalam	2014	2015	
Pataas	Ashutosh Rana	Minister G.K.	Hindi	Telugu	2015	2016	
Saamy	'Chiyaan' Vikram	D.C.P. Aarusaamy	Hindi	Tamil	2003	2015	
Heart Attack	Vikramjeet Virk	Makrand Kamati	Hindi	Telugu	2014	2016	
Son of Satyamurthy	Upendra Rao	Devaraj Naidu	Hindi	Telugu	2015	2016	
Govindudu Andarivadele	Meka Srikanth	Bangari	Hindi	Telugu	2014	2016	
Anjaan	Manoj Bajpayee	Imran Bhai	Hindi	Tamil	2014	2016	
Vajrakaya	Shiva Rajkumar	Viraj	Hindi	Kannada	2015	2016	
Vedalam	Rahul Dev	Rahul	Hindi	Tamil	2015	2016	
Puli	Manoj Bajpayee	Al Saleem	Hindi	Telugu	2010	2016	
Baahubali: The Conclusion	Sathyaraj	Kattappa	Hindi	Telugu	2017	2017	
Baahubali: The Conclusion	Sathyaraj	Kattappa	Hindi	Telugu	2017	2022	
Sarrainodu	Meka Srikanth	Sripathi	Hindi	Telugu	2016	2017	
Super	Upendra Rao	Subhash Chandra Gandhi	Hindi	Kannada	2010	2017	
Billa	Rahman	Dharmendra / Devil	Hindi	Telugu	2009	2017	
Kalpana	Upendra Rao	Raghava	Hindi	Kannada	2012	2017	
Janatha Garage	Suresh	Suresh	Hindi	Telugu	2016	2017	
Babu Bangaram	Venkatesh Daggubati	A.C.P. Krishna alias Babu Bangaram	Hindi	Telugu	2016	2017	
Kalpana 2	Upendra Rao	Raghava / Jade Shivu	Hindi	Kannada	2016	2017	
Theri	Sai Dheena	Rogue in a beggar's disguise	Hindi	Tamil	2016	2017	
Theri	Stun Siva	Karikalan (Kalicharan in Hindi version)	Hindi	Tamil	2016	2017	
Velaiilla Pattadhari 2	Samuthirakani	Raghuvaran's father	Hindi	Tamil	2017	2017	
Hyper	Murali Sharma	Gaja Bhai	Hindi	Telugu	2016	2017	
Bairavaa	Mime Gopi	Karuvadu Kumar (Dushyant Kumar in Hindi version)	Hindi	Tamil	2017	2017	
Duvvada Jagannadham	Murali Sharma	Purushottam	Hindi	Telugu	2017	2017	
Winner	Jagapathi Babu	Mahendra Reddy	Hindi	Telugu	2017	2017	
Doosukeltha	Rao Ramesh	Sarweshwar	Hindi	Telugu	2013	2017	
Dynamite	Yog Japee	Police Officer Arunraj	Hindi	Telugu	2015	2017	
Tagore	Sivasankara 'Chiranjeevi' Varaprasad Konidela	Professor Tagore, Chief Of A.C.F. (Anti Corruption Force)	Hindi	Telugu	2003	2017	
Santhu Straight Forward	Anant Nagarkatte	Ananya's grandfather and Deva's father	Hindi	Kannada	2016	2017	
Mental Police	Meka Srikanth	Unknown	Hindi	Telugu	2016	2017	
Nene Raju Nene Mantri	Ashutosh Rana	Subbarayudu	Hindi	Telugu	2017	2017	
Patel S. I. R.	Jagapathi Babu	Subhash Patel & Dr. Vallabh Patel (Dual role)	Hindi	Telugu	2017	2018	
Gayatri	Manchu 'Mohan Babu' Bhakthavatsalam	Gayatri Patel (Gayatri Mehta in Hindi version) / Dasari Sivaji	Hindi	Telugu	2018	2018	
Achcham Yenbadhu Madamaiyada	Baba Sehgal	Kamath	Hindi	Tamil	2016	2018	
Agnyaathavaasi	Murali Sharma	Sharma (Konda in Hindi version)	Hindi	Telugu	2018	2018	
Hebbuli	V. Ravichandran	Sathya Moorthy	Hindi	Kannada	2017	2018	
Dora	Harish Uthaman	Police officer	Hindi	Tamil	2017	2018	
Gopala Gopala	Murali Sharma	Akbar Khan	Hindi	Telugu	2015	2018	
Chanti	Atul Kulkarni	MLA Sarvarayudu (Sachidanand Chakravarthy in Hindi version)	Hindi	Telugu	2004	2018	
Thikka	Rajendra Prasad	Manohar	Hindi	Telugu	2016	2018	
Vivegam	Ajith Kumar	Ajay Kumar a.k.a. AK	Hindi	Tamil	2017	2018	
Theeran Adhigaaram Ondru	Bose Venkat	Sathya	Hindi	Tamil	2017	2018	
Bhaagamathie	Murali Sharma	ACP Sampath	Hindi	Telugu	2018	2018	
Jaya Janaki Nayaka	Jagapathi Babu	Ashwadh Narayana Varma	Hindi	Telugu	2017	2018	
Villain	Meka Srikanth	Felix D. Vincent	Hindi	Malayalam	2017	2018	
Paisa Vasool	Mukhtar Khan	Police officer	Hindi	Telugu	2017	2018	
Paisa Vasool	Ali	Theda Singh's friend	Hindi	Telugu	2017	2018	
Guru	Venkatesh Daggubati	Aditya "Aadi"	Hindi	Telugu	2017	2018	
Sketch	'Chiyaan' Vikram	Jeeva (Sketch)	Hindi	Tamil	2018	2018	
Tik Tik Tik	Vincent Asokan	Colonel D. Raghuram	Hindi	Tamil	2018	2018	
K.G.F: Chapter 1	Ayyappa P. Sharma	Vanaram	Hindi	Kannada	2018	2018	
Raju Gari Gadhi 2	Akkineni Nagarjuna	Rudra	Hindi	Telugu	2017	2018	
Yuddham Sharanam	Murali Sharma	Jaidev "JD" Shastri	Hindi	Telugu	2017	2018	
Manam	Akkineni Nagarjuna	Seetharamudu / Nageswara "Bittu" Rao	Hindi	Telugu	2014	2018	
Touch Chesi Chudu	Murali Sharma	Police Commissioner	Hindi	Telugu	2018	2018	
Touch Chesi Chudu	Murali Sharma	Police Commissioner	Hindustani	Telugu	2018	2021	
Lucifer	Sai Kumar	Mahesha Varma	Hindi	Malayalam	2019	2019	
Jersey	Sathyaraj	Coach Murthy	Hindi	Telugu	2019	2019	
Cobra	Mammootty	Raja (Rajavembala) / Sivadas Naidu	Hindi	Malayalam	2012	2019	
Vunnadhi Okate Zindagi	Anand	Abhi's father	Hindi	Telugu	2017	2019	
Kurukshetra	Darshan Thoogudeepa Srinivas	Duryodhana / Suyodhana	Hindi	Kannada	2019	2019	
Aatadukundam Raa	Murali Sharma	Vijay Ram	Hindi	Telugu	2016	2019	
Indrajith	Sachin Khedekar	Mayil Vahanam (Mahadevi Varma in Hindi version)	Hindi	Tamil	2017	2019	
Kavan	Akashdeep Saigal	Kalyan	Hindi	Tamil	2017	2019	
Kavacham	Harish Uthaman	Sarath Chandra IPS	Hindi	Telugu	2018	2019	
Nela Ticket	Sampath Raj	ACP Sampath Reddy	Hindi	Telugu	2018	2019	
Amar Akbar Anthony	Rajveer Ankur Singh	Rajveer	Hindi	Telugu	2018	2019	
Jai Simha	Nandamuri Balakrishna	Narasimha	Hindi	Telugu	2018	2019	
Pailwaan	Sharath Lohitashwa	Boxing Coach Vijayendra	Hindi	Kannada	2019	2019	
Varuthapadatha Valibar Sangam	Sathyaraj	Sivanaandi	Hindi	Tamil	2013	2019	
Ghajinikanth	Sampath Raj	Sathyamoorthy	Hindi	Tamil	2018	2019	
'96	Bagavathi Perumal	Murali	Hindi	Tamil	2018	2019	
iSmart Shankar	Raj Deepak Shetty	Devendra Viswanath	Hindi	Telugu	2019	2020	
Vijetha	Murali Sharma	K. Sridhar Rao	Hindi	Telugu	2018	2020	
Vada Chennai	Samuthirakani	Guna	Hindi	Tamil	2018	2020	
Sita	Sonu Sood	MLA Basavaraju (Bhairav Raj in Hindi version)	Hindi	Telugu	2019	2020	
Dwaraka	Murali Sharma	Chaitanya	Hindi	Telugu	2017	2020	
Kaithi	Narain	Inspector Bejoy (Arjun in Hindi version)	Hindi	Tamil	2019	2020	
Prati Roju Pandage	Sathyaraj	Raghu Ramayya	Hindi	Telugu	2019	2020	
Prati Roju Pandage	Murali Sharma	Dhamodhar (Damodar in Hindi version)	Hindi	Telugu	2019	2022	
Saakshyam	Jagapathi Babu	Munu Swamy	Hindi	Telugu	2018	2020	
Aravinda Sametha Veera Raghava	Jagapathi Babu	Basi Reddy	Hindi	Telugu	2018	2020	
Bhale Bhale Magadivoy	Murali Sharma	Panduranga Rao (Pradyuman in Hindi version)	Hindi	Telugu	2015	2020	
Marudhamalai	Raghuvaran †	Suryanarayanan IAS	Hindi	Tamil	2007	2020	
Thambi	Sathyaraj	Gnanamoorthy	Hindi	Tamil	2019	2020	
Nerkonda Paarvai	Ajith Kumar	Lawyer Bharath Subramaniam	Hindi	Tamil	2019	2021	
Parole	Mammootty	Alex Mestri / Alex Philippose / Sakhavu Alex	Hindi	Malayalam	2018	2021	
Abrahaminte Santhathikal	Mammootty	Derick Abraham	Hindi	Malayalam	2018	2021	
Sakka Podu Podu Raja	Sampath Raj	Bhavani	Hindi	Tamil	2017	2021	
Attack	Jagapathi Babu	Kaali	Hindi	Telugu	2016	2021	
Soorarai Pottru	Prakash Belawadi	Prakash Babu	Hindi	Tamil	2020	2021	
Pogaru	Sampath Raj	JB	Hindi	Kannada	2021	2021	
Asuran	Subramaniam Siva	Murugan	Hindi	Tamil	2019	2021	
Roberrt	P. Ravi Shankar	Sarkar	Hindi	Kannada	2021	2021	
Annabelle Sethupathi	Jagapathi Babu	Kadhiresan	Hindi	Tamil	2021	2021	
Dhill	'Chiyaan' Vikram	Kanagavel (Virender Kumar in Hindi version)	Hindi	Tamil	2001	2021	
Pushpa: The Rise	Rao Ramesh	Bhumireddy Siddappa Naidu	Hindi	Telugu	2021	2021	
Ala Vaikunthapurramuloo	Murali Sharma	Valmiki	Hindi	Telugu	2020	2022	
Bheeshma	Sampath Raj	Deva	Hindi	Telugu	2020	2022	
Mersal	Sathyaraj	DCP Rathnavel (Ratnakar in Hindi version) "Randy"	Hindi	Tamil	2017	2022	
Thiruttu Payale	Manoj K. Jayan	Sivaraj	Hindi	Tamil	2006	2022	
Ponniyin Selvan: I	R. Sarathkumar	Periya Pazhuvettaraiyar (Maharaj Parvateshwar in Hindi Version)	Hindi	Tamil	2022	2022	
Akhanda	Nandamuri Balakrishna	Akhanda Rudra Sikandar Aghora and Murali Krishna	Hindi	Telugu	2021	2022	
Daaku Maharaaj	Ravi Kishan (Voice in Original dubbed by P. Ravi Shankar)	Trimurtulu MLA	Hindi	Telugu	2025	2025	

==== Foreign language films ====
Title	Actor	Character	Dub language	Original language	Original year release	Dub year release	Notes
You Only Live Twice	Sean Connery	James Bond	Hindi	English	1967	Unknown	
On Her Majesty's Secret Service	George Lazenby	James Bond	Hindi	English	1969	Unknown	
Jaws 2	Roy Scheider	Chief Martin Brody	Hindi	English	1978	Unknown	
Scarface	Al Pacino	Tony Montana	Hindi	English	1983	1990	
The Living Daylights	Jeroen Krabbé	General Georgi Koskov	Hindi	English	1987	Unknown	
Spawn	Michael Jai White	Albert "Al" Simmons / Spawn	Hindi	English	1997	1997	
Blade	Wesley Snipes	Eric Brooks / Blade	Hindi	English	1998	1998	
Good Will Hunting	Ben Affleck	Chuckie Sullivan	Hindi	English	1997	Unknown	
The Tuxedo	Ritchie Coster	Dietrich Banning	Hindi	English; Cantonese Chinese	2002	Unknown	
Ghost Rider	Donal Logue	Mack	Hindi	English	2007	2007	
National Security	Eric Roberts	Nash	Hindi	English	2003	2003	
The Time Machine	Orlando Jones	Vox 114	Hindi	English	2002	2002	
The Italian Job	Mark Wahlberg	Charlie Croker	Hindi	English	2003	2003	
The Core	Richard Jenkins	Lieutenant General Thomas Purcell	Hindi	English	2003	2003	
National Treasure	Sean Bean	Ian	Hindi	English	2004	2004	
King Arthur	Clive Owen	King Arthur	Hindi	English	2004	2004	
Mindhunters	LL Cool J	Gabe Jenson	Hindi	English	2004	2004	
Harold & Kumar Go to White Castle	Christopher Meloni	Freakshow	Hindi	English	2004	2004	
XXX: State of the Union	Ice Cube	Darius Stone / XXX	Hindi	English	2005	2005	
Son of the Mask	Jamie Kennedy	Tim Avery / The Mask	Hindi	English	2005	2005	
Fantastic Four: Rise of the Silver Surfer	Ioan Gruffudd	Dr. Reed Richards / Mr. Fantastic	Hindi	English	2007	2007	
Harry Potter and the Prisoner of Azkaban	Gary Oldman	Sirius Black	Hindi	English	2004	2004	
Harry Potter and the Goblet of Fire	Gary Oldman	Sirius Black	Hindi	English	2005	2005	
Harry Potter and the Order of the Phoenix	Gary Oldman	Sirius Black	Hindi	English	2007	2007	
Harry Potter and the Deathly Hallows – Part 2	Gary Oldman	Sirius Black	Hindi	English	2011	2011	
The Prestige	Christian Bale	Alfred Borden	Hindi	English	2006	2006	
Scary Movie 4	Craig Bierko	Tom Ryan	Hindi	English	2006	2006	
The Golden Compass	Daniel Craig	Lord Asriel	Hindi	English	2007	2007	
Wild Hogs	Ray Liotta	Jack Blade	Hindi	English	2007	2007	
Ip Man	Chen Zhihui	Master Liu	Hindi	Cantonese Chinese; Mandarin Chinese; Japanese	2008	2009	
Outlander	Jim Caviezel	Kainan	Hindi	English; Icelandic; French	2008	2008	
Inkheart	Brendan Fraser	Mortimer "Mo" Folchart	Hindi	English	2008	2008	
The International	Clive Owen	Louis Salinger	Hindi	English	2009	2009	
Inglourious Basterds	Christoph Waltz	SD Colonel Hans Landa	Hindi	English; German; French; Italian	2009	2009	
Universal Soldier: Regeneration	Jean-Claude Van Damme	Luc Devereaux	Hindi	English	2009	2009	
Book of Eli	Denzel Washington	Eli	Hindi	English	2010	2010	
Scream 4	David Arquette	Sheriff Riley	Hindi	English	2011	2011	
The Three Musketeers	Matthew Macfadyen	Athos	Hindi	English	2011	2011	
Super 8	Kyle Chandler	Deputy Jackson Lamb	Hindi	English	2011	2011	
Intruders	Clive Owen	John Farrow	Hindi	English; Spanish	2011	2011	
The Adjustment Bureau	John Slattery	Richardson	Hindi	English	2011	2011	
Priest	Paul Bettany	Priest	Hindi	English	2011	2011	
Underworld: Awakening	Michael Ealy	Detective Sebastian	Hindi	English	2012	2012	
Men in Black 3	Josh Brolin	Young Agent K	Hindi	English	2012	2012	
Journey 2: The Mysterious Island	Dwayne Johnson	Hank Parsons	Hindi	English	2012	2012	
Zero Dark Thirty	Jason Clarke	Dan	Hindi	English	2012	2012	
Red Dawn	Jeffrey Dean Morgan	Sergeant Major Andrew Tanner	Hindi	English	2012	2012	
Homefront	Chuck Zito	Danny "Danny T" Turrie	Hindi	English	2013	2013	
Transformers	Tyrese Gibson	Robert Epps	Hindi	English	2007	2007	
Transformers: Revenge of the Fallen	Tyrese Gibson	Robert Epps	Hindi	English	2009	2009	
Transformers: Dark of the Moon	Tyrese Gibson	Robert Epps	Hindi	English	2011	2011	
Pirates of the Caribbean: On Stranger Tides	Greg Ellis	Lieutenant Theodore Groves	Hindi	English	2011	2011	
The Bourne Ultimatum	Matt Damon	Jason Bourne	Hindi	English	2007		
Sherlock Holmes	Mark Strong	Lord Henry Blackwood	Hindi	English	2009	2009	
Sherlock Holmes	James Fox	Sir Thomas Rotheram	Hindi	English	2009	2009	
American Gangster	Roger Guenveur Smith Common	Nate Turner Lucas	Hindi	English	2007	2007	
Contagion	Matt Damon Chin Han	Mitch Emhoff Sun Feng	Hindi	English	2011	2011	
Unstoppable	Wesley Snipes	Dean Cage	Hindi	English	2004		
A Few Good Men	Kevin Bacon	Captain Jack Ross, USMC	Hindi	English	1992		
Robocop	Michael Keaton	Raymond Sellars	Hindi	English	2014	2014	
The Amazing Spider-Man	Denis Leary	Captain George Stacy	Hindi	English	2012	2012	
The Amazing Spider-Man 2	Denis Leary	Captain George Stacy	Hindi	English	2014	2014	
The Karate Kid	Jackie Chan	Mr. Han	Hindi	English	2010	2011	
Vanilla Sky	Kurt Russell	Dr. Curtis McCabe	Hindi	English	2001	2015	
Riddick	Jordi Mollà	Santana	Hindi	English	2013	2013	
San Andreas	Dwayne Johnson	Chief Raymond "Ray" Gaines	Hindi	English	2015	2015	
Star Wars: The Force Awakens	Oscar Isaac	Poe Dameron	Hindi	English	2015	2015	
Star Wars: The Last Jedi	Oscar Isaac	Poe Dameron	Hindi	English	2017	2017	
Star Wars: The Rise of Skywalker	Oscar Isaac	Poe Dameron	Hindi	English	2019	2019	
The Legend of Hercules	Liam Garrigan	Iphicles	Hindi	English	2014	2014	
Assassin's Creed	Michael K. Williams	Moussa	Hindi	English	2016	2016	
Baywatch	Dwayne Johnson	Mitch Buchannon	Hindi	English	2017	2017	
Inspector Gadget	Rupert Everett	Sanford Scolex / Dr. Claw	Hindi	English	1999	1999	
Kingsman: The Golden Circle	Jeff Bridges	Champagne "Champ"	Hindi	English	2017	2017	
Batman	Michael Keaton	Bruce Wayne / Batman	Hindi	English	1989	Unknown	
Batman Returns	Michael Keaton	Bruce Wayne / Batman	Hindi	English	1992	Unknown	
Batman Begins	Christian Bale	Bruce Wayne / Batman	Hindi	English	2005	2005	
The Dark Knight	Christian Bale	Bruce Wayne / Batman	Hindi	English	2008	2008	
The Dark Knight Rises	Christian Bale	Bruce Wayne / Batman	Hindi	English	2012	2012	
Batman v Superman: Dawn of Justice	Ben Affleck	Bruce Wayne / Batman	Hindi	English	2016	2016	
Justice League	Ben Affleck	Bruce Wayne / Batman	Hindi	English	2017	2017	
The Avengers	Mark Ruffalo	Bruce Banner / Hulk	Hindi	English	2012	2012	
Iron Man 3	Mark Ruffalo	Bruce Banner / Hulk (uncredited cameo)	Hindi	English	2013	2013	
Avengers: Age of Ultron	Mark Ruffalo	Bruce Banner / Hulk	Hindi	English	2015	2015	
Thor: Ragnarok	Mark Ruffalo	Bruce Banner / Hulk	Hindi	English	2017	2017	
Avengers: Infinity War	Mark Ruffalo	Bruce Banner / Hulk	Hindi	English	2018	2018	
Captain Marvel	Mark Ruffalo	Bruce Banner / Hulk (uncredited cameo)	Hindi	English	2019	2019	
Avengers: Endgame	Mark Ruffalo	Bruce Banner / Hulk	Hindi	English	2019	2019	
Venom	Tom Hardy	Venom (voice)	Hindi	English	2018	2018	
Fantastic Beasts: The Crimes of Grindelwald	Jude Law	Albus Dumbledore	Hindi	English	2018	2018	
Men in Black: International	Liam Neeson	High T	Hindi	English	2019	2019	
The Irishman	Al Pacino	Jimmy Hoffa	Hindi	English	2019	2019	Released on Netflix.
The Flash	Michael Keaton	Bruce Wayne / Batman	Hindi	English	2023	2023	
Brothers	Josh Brolin	Moke Munger	Hindi	English	2024	2024	Released on Amazon Prime Video.

=== Animated films ===
Title	Original voice	Character	Dub language	Original language	Original year release	Dub year Release	Notes
The Wild	Kiefer Sutherland	Samson (Samsher)	Hindi	English	2006	2006	Samay's name is mentioned in the Hindi dub credits taken from the DVD release of the film. Samson's name was changed to Samsher in the Hindi dub. Also, the younger version of this character was voiced by Malak Shah in the Hindi dub.
Beauty and the Beast	Robby Benson	Beast	Hindi	English	1991	2009	Aired on Television dubbed in Hindi.
Kung Fu Panda	Ian McShane	Tai Lung	Hindi	English	2008	2008	
WALL-E	Ben Burtt	WALL-E	Hindi	English	2008	2008	
Megamind	Brad Pitt	Metro Man	Hindi	English	2010	2010	
Wreck-It Ralph	John C. Reilly	Wreck-It Ralph	Hindi	English	2012	2012	
Ralph Breaks the Internet	John C. Reilly	Wreck-It Ralph	Hindi	English	2018	2018	
Transformers Prime Beast Hunters: Predacons Rising	Daran Norris	Knock Out	Hindi	English	2013	2013	Television film
Coco	Benjamin Bratt	Ernesto de la Cruz	Hindi	English	2017	2017	
Spider-Man: Into the Spider-Verse	Brian Tyree Henry	Jefferson Davis	Hindi	English	2018	2018	
Spider-Man: Across the Spider-Verse	Brian Tyree Henry	Jefferson Davis	Hindi	English	2023	2023	

== See also ==
- List of Indian dubbing artists
