= Shamir Tandon =

Indian music composer and director

- Born: Mumbai, Maharashtra, India
- Other names: Shameer Tandon
- Occupations: Composer; Music director
- Years active: 2003–present
- Website: www.shamirtandon.com

Shamir Tandon is an Indian music composer and director who works in Indian cinema. He made his debut as a Music Director with Raveena Tandon's 'Stumped' in 2003. He is known for the movies like Page 3, Traffic Signal, Inkaar, Bal Ganesh, Mission Istaanbul and Corporate. He has made singers like Lata Mangeshkar, Asha Bhosle, Jagjit Singh and Manna Dey sing to his tunes. He also written and composed music for Sachin Tendulkar's singing debut in 2017 with the 'Cricket Wali Beat' song in collaboration with singer Sonu Nigam. He is also the founding managing director at 'Music Boutique' He has created an anti-piracy song titled 'Salaami ho jaye' to spread awareness about intellectual property rights which was released on the occasion of World Intellectual Day.

== Early life ==
Shamir Tandon was born into a middle-class Hindu family located in Mumbai, Maharashtra and lost his parents early in life. He completed his cost accountancy and MBA and then entered the corporate world where he last worked for EMI Virgin Group.

== Career ==
Shamir Tandon with an MBA in Cost Accounting from Narsee Monjee Institute of Management Studies started his career as a merchant banker with firms like Kotak Mahindra and then Birla Global which was then followed by a couple of years at Plus Channel.

He then joined Virgin EMI, as a marketing manager where he played a key role in marketing and distributing global acts like The Beatles, Pink Floyd, Frank Sinatra to Norah Jones, Robbie Williams and Kylie Minogue.

Tandon was involved in coordinating performances of internationally acclaimed bands such as Deep Purple, Rolling Stones, MLTR, and Richard Clayderman in India. Over the course of his nine-year tenure, he progressed from the position of Marketing Manager to the CEO of Virgin EMI Indian Subcontinent.

Tandon is the founder and managing director of a brand solutions company called Music Boutique.

Tandon also collaborated with Spotify for a podcast titled "De Taali - Life of a Transgender", which was the number one podcast on Spotify globally within a week of its release and remained the same for almost four months.

Tandon has composed over 150 commercial jingles for prominent companies including Ambuja Cement, Idea, Big Bazaar, ICICI, Pepsi, Samsonite, SBI, LIC, Airtel, LG and JK Tyre.

Shamir curated the world's first transgender band, 6 Pack Band. The band was launched by Sonu Nigam. Apart from him, the band has also collaborated with stars like Shah Rukh Khan, Arjun Kapoor, Hrithik Roshan, and Rahat Fateh Ali Khan. The band’s goal for acceptance was also met internationally when they won the Cannes Grand Prix Glass Lion Award in 2016, while also becoming the first-ever South Asian band to perform on the stage of the Cannes Lions International Festival Of Creativity in 2017.

Shamir went on to curate the 'isspeshal' 6 Pack Band 2.0 consists of children with special needs in the mental health space. The collaborations included celebrities such Rani Mukherji, Tiger Shroff, Mika Singh, Vishal Dadlani, Neha Kakkar & other celebrities including Maniesh Paul, Divyanka Tripathi, Nakuul Mehta, Rithvik Dhanjani, Rannvijay Singha, Anusha Dandekar. Chef Sanjeev Kapoor, Karan Kundra & RJ Malishka.

== Music experience ==
Shamir Tandon entered Bollywood with the film Page 3. He composed music for Madhur Bhandarkar's acclaimed movies Corporate and Traffic Signal. Tandon collaborated with Shemaroo for the Bal Ganesh series and worked with Sudhir Mishra on Inkaar and the recent film Afwaah.

His collaborations include filmmakers such as Balaji for Ragini MMS, UTV Disney for Pizza, Ashtvinayak for Superstar, Sony Pictures for Piku, Viacom 18 for Inkaar, Sangeet Sivan for Click, Sanjay Gupta for Acid Factory, Percept Sahara for Jail, Sanjay Leela Bhansali for My Friend Pinto.

His non-film music work includes a composition for Asha Bhosale's album Asha and Friends released in 2006 which also featured the vocals of Sanjay Dutt, Urmila Matondkar, Bret Lee etc. Tandon did a composition of a popular cricket-themed song, featuring the voice of Sachin Tendulkar & Sonu Nigam.

In 2012, Shamir in collaboration with Flipkart India created an anti-piracy song to spread awareness about intellectual property rights featuring Sonu Nigam, Shankar Mahadevan, Sunidhi Chauhan, Mohit Chauhan, Shaan, Kailash Kher and Zanai Bhosle.

He recently collaborated with Sudhir Mishra for his mystery thriller film Afwaah. The film starred Nawazuddin Siddiqui, Bhumi Pednekar and Sumeet Vyas in lead roles.

== Filmography and discography ==
Films
| Year | Title | Language | Notes |
|---|---|---|---|
| 2003 | Stumped | Hindi | |
| 2004 | Rakht | Hindi | |
| 2005 | Page 3 | Hindi | |
| 2006 | Corporate | Hindi | |
| 2007 | Traffic Signal | Hindi | |
| 2008 | Mission Istaanbul | Hindi | |
| 2009 | Jail | Hindi | |
| 2009 | Bal Ganesh 2 | Hindi | |
| 2011 | Ragini MMS 2 | Hindi | |
| 2013 | Inkaar | Hindi | |
| 2015 | Piku | Hindi | |
| 2015 | Hai Golmaal in White House | Hindi | |
| 2017 | Bank Chor | Hindi | |
| 2018 | Welcome To New York | Hindi | |
| 2019 | Khamoshi | Hindi | |
| 2019 | The Body | Hindi | |
| 2019 | Marudhar Express | Hindi | |

Non-Film
| Year | Title | Notes |
|---|---|---|
| 2006 | Asha & Friends | |
| 2014 | Zaroori Tha | |
| 2016 | 6 Pack Band | |
| 2017 | Sachin's Cricket Wali Beat feat. Sonu Nigam | |
| 2018 | 6 Pack Band 2.0 | |
| 2021 | Tips Rewind | |
| 2021 | Heartbeat | |
