= Maha (film) =

2022 film written and directed by U.R. Jameel

- Theatrical release poster
- Directed by: U. R. Jameel
- Written by: U. R. Jameel
- Produced by: V. Mathialagan
- Starring: Hansika Motwani; Srikanth
- Cinematography: J. Laxman Kumar
- Edited by: John Abraham
- Music by: Ghibran
- Production company: Etcetera Entertainment
- Release date: 22 July 2022
- Running time: 171 minutes
- Country: India
- Language: Tamil

Maha (transl. Great) is a 2022 Indian Tamil-language action thriller film written and directed by U. R. Jameel and produced by V. Mathialagan under the production company Etcetera Entertainment. The film stars Hansika Motwani in her 50th film, with Srikanth, Manasvi Kottachi, Sujith Shankar, Thambi Ramaiah, and Karunakaran in prominent roles along with Silambarasan. This film's music is composed by Ghibran with cinematography by J. Laxman Kumar and editing by John Abraham JK.

The film was announced in 2019 and released on 22 July 2022 after a 3-year delay and being postponed for many times. The film received mixed to negative reviews from critics and audience and became a box office failure. Maha joined Aha's library of films and premiered on their platform on 9 September 2022.

== Plot ==
The film begins with Maha complaining to her boyfriend Malik about some men harassing her. The men pull up in front of them, causing Malik to fight them. The scene then switches to a man sitting in front of a girl who is unconscious in a room full of blood. The police then find the corpse of an 8-year-old girl in front of a building. Another girl is kidnapped and murdered, and her corpse is also discovered. Maha has a daughter, Aishu, whom she sends to school. A doctor suggests to ACP Vikram that the killer may possibly be a doctor, as he has erased all semen from the girl's body after raping her multiple times. Alex Pandian, a constable, assists Vikram with the case.

While Aishu is returning home, the school bus stops due to repairs. The bus conductor walks with Aishu to take her home, but halfway through, he has to go back, so Aishu walks the rest of the way by herself. Maha realises that Aishu is not home and enquires about her at the school. When Maha reaches the homes of the bus conductor and driver, they have absconded. Aishu has been kidnapped and is being held by the killer. Maha complains to Vikram about her missing daughter. While the killer distracts Maha by calling her and asking her to go somewhere, he enters her house to delete the CCTV footage. Maha then receives a phone call telling her to bring cash to a building.

One month later, Alex's granddaughter goes missing. Alex's daughter goes to a building with cash, only for the killer to take the money and attempt to escape. Vikram catches the killer and removes his mask, revealing Alex's face. The scene cuts back to Maha standing at the top of the building, looking down and smiling. The film then shows a flashback in which Maha and Malik are in love. Malik is a pilot who leaves for work just as Maha discovers she is pregnant. Maha eagerly waits to tell Malik the happy news. However, she learns that the plane Malik was flying has gone missing in the Arabian Sea. The scene then flashes back to Maha grieving over her daughter's death.

Maha enquires with the police about her daughter's case, but they chase her away. Maha decides to find the answers herself and bribes a policeman to give her all the case details. Through this, Maha realises that the CCTV footage taken from her house does not match the copy she has. Vikram questions Alex, who reveals that one day, while Vikram was investigating Maha's case, Alex found his son Matthew's car parked on the road and discovered Aishu in the boot. He calls Maha to tell her to go to the building, then takes Aishu with him and leaves her there. Aishu, not fully awake, walks over the edge and falls to her death. Alex did this because he did not want his son to get caught. Maha listens repeatedly to the recordings of the killer speaking to her. In the background of the recordings, she hears a mosque and a train. Maha goes to Matthew's shop to ask about nearby train tracks, not realising that Alex's granddaughter is inside. As Maha leaves, she hears the same sound from the recordings, along with a passing train. She discovers that Aishu's phone has been switched on and realises that Matthew is the killer. Matthew and Maha fight, during which Maha is severely injured but ultimately succeeds in killing Matthew just as Vikram arrives with the police force.

== Cast ==
- Hansika Motwani as Maha
- Silambarasan as Malik
- Srikanth as ACP Vikram
- Thambi Ramaiah as Inspector Alex Pandian
- Karunakaran as Sub-Inspector Karuna
- Sujith Shankar as Matthew
- Mahat Raghavendra as Varun
- Pooja Devariya as Nikitha
- Sanam Shetty as Riya
- Kishore Rajkumar as Bharath
- Jagan as Kavin
- Manasvi Kottachi as Aishwarya "Aishu"
- Savi Borah as Alex's granddaughter
- Singamuthu as Durai
- Thangadurai as Dhamu
- Nanditha Jennifer as Alex's daughter (uncredited)

== Production ==
Maha is Hansika Motwani's 50th film as an actor and Mohamaad Ghibran's 25th film as a composer. Sanam Shetty, Srikanth, Karunakaran and Thambi Ramaiah were chosen for important roles in the film. Silambarasan plays a guest role. Filming was scheduled to take place in late January 2020.

== Music ==
Maha

Soundtrack album by Ghibran
- Released: 12 July 2022
- Recorded: 2021–2022
- Genre: Feature film soundtrack
- Language: Tamil
- Producer: Ghibran

Ghibran chronology
Home Minister (2022)	Maha (2022)	Dejavu (2022)

The music of the film was composed by Ghibran in his 25th film as composer. The entire soundtrack album was released on 12 July 2022. The lyrics for the songs are written by Viveka, Madhan Karky and Soundara Rajan.

- "Kedutthutiye" - Benny Dayal
- "Hey Edhiriye (Happy Version)" - Deepthi Suresh
- "Hey Edhiriye (Sad Version)" - Srisha

== Release ==
=== Theatrical ===
The film was released by theatrically worldwide on 22 July 2022, following delays and postponements.

=== Home media ===
The post-theatrical streaming rights of the film were acquired by Aha, and began streaming on 5 August 2022.

== Reception ==
Logesh Balachandran of Times of India gave 1.5 out of 5 and wrote "In short, Maha is not as effective as it wants to be." S. Subhakeertana of OTT Play rated the film 1 out of 5, stating that "The ending of the film might frustrate the viewer as it offers no catharsis. The story equally leaves you untouched because it does not care to rise above stereotypes." Dinamalar rated the film 1.5 out of 5.
