= Devadas Brothers =

2021 Indian film

- Theatrical Release Poster
- Directed by: Janakiraman
- Written by: Janakiraman
- Produced by: Mathiyazhagan
- Starring: Dhruvva; Ajai Prasath; Hari Krishnan; Bala Saravanan
- Cinematography: M. C. Ganesh Chandra
- Edited by: Marish
- Music by: Dharan Kumar
- Production company: Etcetera Entertainment
- Release date: 3 September 2021
- Country: India
- Language: Tamil

Devadas Brothers is a 2021 Indian Tamil-language comedy drama film directed by Janakiraman and starring Dhruvva, Ajai Prasath, Hari Krishnan and Bala Saravanan. Produced by Mathiyazhagan, it was released on 3 September 2021.

== Cast ==
- Dhruvva as Ram
- Ajai Prasath as Krishna
- Hari Krishnan as Jegathesh
- Bala Saravanan as Sathya
- Sanchita Shetty
- Shilpa Manjunath
- Aara
- Deepthi Manne
- Samuthirakani as Writer
- Robo Shankar as Lakshman
- Thambi Ramaiah
- Mayilsamy
- Deepa Shankar as Jegathesh's mother

== Production ==
The film began its shoot in 2016 and was completed in early 2017. Promotions for the film's release began in 2020.

== Soundtrack ==
Soundtrack composed by Dharan Kumar.

- Vaa Machan - Michael
- Dama Duma - Unni Nair
- Rotula Train - Dharan
- Soodana Theneer - Dharan
- Aendi Paatha - Anthony Daasan
- Thanga Magan - Dharan

== Release ==
The film had a theatrical release on 3 September 2021, and became the first Tamil film to release in Tamil Nadu after the second wave of COVID-19. A critic from The Times of India noted "Devadas Brothers is an uneven message movie, and gave the film two stars out of five. A reviewer from OTTPlay noted "despite a run time of less than 100 minutes, it is an uphill task to sit through the movie, thanks to weak characterizations, generic staging of sequences and cringeworthy dialogues".

A month later, the film was released on streaming platform Netflix.
