= Mane Katti Nodu =

- Directed by: Sri Sadguru
- Written by: C. V. Shivashankar (dialogues)
- Story by: C. V. Shivashankar
- Produced by: C. V. Shivashankar
- Starring: Narayan; Udaykumar; Hanumantha Rao; Shivashankar; Thipatur Raghu
- Cinematography: G. Chandran; Govindaswamy; Rachappan
- Edited by: K. P. Krishna; Chinnappa; S. Palani
- Music by: R. Rathna
- Production company: Thipatur Films
- Distributed by: Thipatur Films
- Release date: 31 December 1965
- Running time: 132 min
- Country: India
- Language: Kannada

Mane Katti Nodu (transl. Build a house and see) is a 1966 Indian Kannada-language film, directed by Sri Sadguru and produced by C. V. Shivashankar and Friends. The film stars Narayan in the lead role, with Udaykumar, Hanumantha Rao, Shivashankar and Thipatur Raghu in supporting roles. The musical score was composed by R. Rathna.

== Cast ==
- V. N. Narayan
- Udaykumar
- Hanumantha Rao
- Shivashankar
- Thipatur Raghu
- Dwarakish as Shankar
- Shanthala
- Meenakumari
- Lalitha
- Ambujadevi
- Leela Jayanthi
- Tiger Prabhakar
- Srinivas
- Madhu Kumar
- Jamakhandi Gururaj
- Ramadas
- Ramu
- Lakshmi Thalikote
- R. Jayanthi
- Nalini
- Chandra
- Vijaya
- Kannika
- Baby Vasuda
- Baby Rekha
- Manjula as Manju (credited as Baby Manjula)
