= C. V. Shivashankar =

Indian film director (1933–2023)

- Born: Chittanahalli Venkatakrishna Bhatta; 23 March 1933
- Died: 27 June 2023 (aged 90)
- Occupations: Film director, writer, producer, lyricist
- Years active: 1961–2023
- Children: Venkat Bharadwaj (son)

Chittanahalli Venkatakrishna Shivashankar Shastry (23 March 1933 – 27 June 2023), also known as Chittanahalli Venkatakrishna Bhatta, was an Indian film director and producer, screenwriter, lyricist and dialogue writer who predominantly worked in the Kannada film industry.

== Career ==
C. V. Shivashankar began his career as an actor and assistant director from the Kannada movie Rathna Manjari starring Udaykumar, M. P. Shankar, Narasimharaju, Leelavathi and others. Later he acted in few Kannada movies, and he become full-fledged director from the movie Padavidhara starring Udaykumar, Kalpana, T. N. Balakrishna and Narasimharaju in the lead roles.

== Personal life ==
Both of his sons Venkat Bharadwaj and Karthik Urs initially worked in the IT industry before transitioning to film careers. Shivashankar died from a heart attack on 27 June 2023, at the age of 90.

== Filmography ==
| Year | Film | Role | Notes |
|---|---|---|---|
| 1962 | Rathna Manjari | Director | |
| 1965 | Mane Katti Nodu | Director | |
| 1967 | Padavidhara | Director | |
| 1968 | Namma Ooru | Director | |
| 2015 | A Day in the City | Producer | |
| 2016 | Bablusha | Producer | |

== Awards ==
- 1991 – Karnataka Rajyotsava Award by Government of Karnataka
