= Chakri Toleti =

Founder & CEO of care.ai

- Born: Chakravarthy Toleti; Visakhapatnam, Andhra Pradesh, India
- Education: University of Central Florida
- Occupations: Founder & CEO of care.ai
- Years active: 1983–present

Chakri Toleti is an Indian American business executive. He is the founder and chief executive officer (CEO) of care.ai, a Florida-based health technology company for healthcare facility automation.

Toleti was also a screenwriter, actor, and visual effects coordinator known for his works in Tamil cinema, and Hindi cinema. He has directed bilingual films such as Unnaipol Oruvan, Billa II, Khamoshi and Kolaiyuthir Kaalam.

== Business career ==
Toleti was the Founder and President of HealthGrid, an enterprise patient engagement platform designed to connect patients and providers via their smart devices. In 2018, HealthGrid was acquired by Allscripts to integrate HealthGrid’s functionality into their FollowMyHealth platform. Prior to HealthGrid, Toleti co-founded Galvanon, a company that first introduced patient self-service kiosk registration to automate patient check-in and intake processes NCR acquired Galvanon in 2005.

=== care.ai ===
care.ai was founded in 2019 in Orlando, Florida, by Toleti, the Founder and current CEO. The Smart Care Facility Platform is the main product which converts care facilities into an AI-powered environment that monitors clinical and operational workflows. The company's ambient monitoring system is used to predict issues before they escalate, for example, tracking patient movement to detect when a patient is about to fall in order to alert staff.

In October 2019, Google partnered with care.ai to use the Coral Edge TPU for autonomous patient predictive monitoring in hospitals and healthcare facilities. It raised $27 million in funding in 2022 and expanded usage in healthcare facilities through integration with Samsung and Google Cloud the next year.

== Film career ==
Toleti's father Dr. Tambu also worked in the film industry. Toleti made his acting debut as a child artist in the Telugu film Sagara Sangamam directed by K. Viswanath, and has acted in over fifteen films. He obtained a bachelor's degree in Film and VFX at the University of Central Florida. He re-entered south Indian cinema with the magnum opus, Dasavathaaram. In 2019, he directed two remake films of the slasher film Hush: the Hindi Khamoshi, and the Tamil Kolaiyuthir Kaalam. He also directed Unread, a black-and-white short film in 2014.

== Filmography ==
=== As director ===
List of films directed
| Year | Title | Language | Notes |
|---|---|---|---|
| 2009 | Unnaipol Oruvan | Tamil | Remake of A Wednesday! |
| 2009 | Eeenadu | Telugu | Remake of A Wednesday! |
| 2012 | Billa II | Tamil | |
| 2018 | Welcome to New York | Hindi | |
| 2019 | Khamoshi | Hindi | Remake of Hush |
| 2019 | Kolaiyuthir Kaalam | Tamil | Remake of Hush |

=== As co-writer ===
List of films co-written
| Year | Title | Language |
|---|---|---|
| 2013 | Vishwaroopam | Tamil/Hindi |
| 2018 | Vishwaroopam 2 | Tamil/Hindi |

=== As actor ===
List of films and roles
| Year | Title | Role | Language | Notes |
|---|---|---|---|---|
| 1983 | Sagara Sangamam | Photographer Assistant | Telugu | Child actor |
| 1983 | Moodu Mullu | Student | Telugu | Child actor |
| 1984 | Mayuri | Mayuri's stepbrother | Telugu | Child actor |
| 1985 | Chinna Veedu | Chakravarthi | Tamil | Child actor |
| 2008 | Dasavathaaram | Sairam | Tamil | |
| 2012 | Billa 2 | Gangster | Tamil | |

Visual effects artist

| Year | Title | Ref. |
|---|---|---|
| 2004 | Sri Anjaneyam | |
