= CMR University School of Legal Studies =

- Type: Law School
- Established: 2003
- Affiliations: CMR University (Parent institution), Bar Council of India
- Dean: T.R. Subramanya
- Location: Chikka Banswadi Road, Bhuvanagiri, Lakshmamma Layout, Banaswadi, Bengaluru, Karnataka 560043, Bangalore, Karnataka, India
- Campus: Urban
- Website: ls.cmr.ac.in

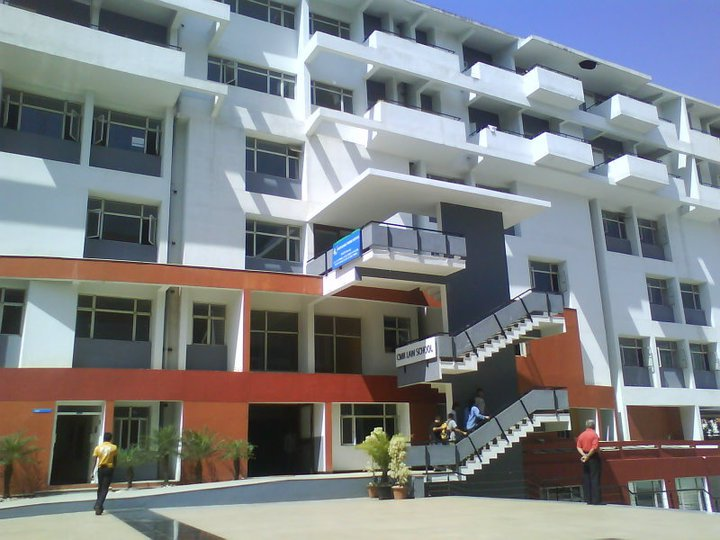
CMR Law School campus building

The CMR University School of Legal Studies, formerly CMR Law School, is a law school located in Bangalore, Karnataka, India. It is approved by the Bar Council of India, and it is a constituent college of CMR University, Bangalore.

== Co-curricular programmes ==
=== CMR National Moot Court Competition ===
The biennial national level moot court competition (2008, 2010) hosted by CMR Law School is one of the most widely contested moot court competitions, with law colleges from all over India participating in this event. Five Sitting Judges of the High Court of Karnataka preside over the finals of the moot court competition.

=== CMR National Cross Examination Competition ===
This is a biannual event that is held by CMR law school the first of its kind in India. The first competition was held in 2009.

== Rankings ==
College rankings

Law – India
- Private colleges
- Outlook India (2022): 10

CMR University School of Legal Studies was ranked tenth in Outlook India's "Top 30 Private Law Colleges in India" of 2022.

== See also ==
- List of law schools in India
