= Bal Ganesh =

- Directed by: Pankaj Sharma
- Produced by: Smita Maroo; Pankaj Sharma
- Starring: Ashar Shaikh
- Edited by: Dimmpy H Bahl
- Animators: H.Biswanath Singh; Deepak Patwal; Shankar Kumar; Umee Kulshreshtha; Prasad D.Mane; Prasad Pathak; Jayesh Badgujar; Anil Jhangir; Kunal Jadhav
- Music by: Songs: Shamir Tandon; Sanjay Dhakan; Rajendra Mehra; Vibha Singh; Shabbir Ahmed; Background Score: Sanjay Dhakan
- Production companies: Shemaroo Entertainment; Astute Media Vision
- Distributed by: Shemaroo Entertainment
- Release date: 26 October 2007
- Running time: 105 minutes
- Country: India
- Language: Hindi
- Budget: ₹3.75 crore
- Box office: ₹69 lakh

Bal Ganesh (transl. Little Ganesh) is a 2007 Indian animated musical religious feature film directed by Pankaj Sharma based on Hindu scriptures. The film is about the divine adventures and sacred tales of Ganesh, the Hindu elephant-headed god, when he was in child form.

== Plot ==
The gods Shiva and Parvati live on Mount Kailash. One day, Parvati asks Nandi to guard the palace and prevent any visitors from coming in while she takes her bath. Shiva enters the palace anyways, which upsets Parvati. She wants an attendant of her own who would obey her above all else. While she is bathing, she creates a mold from sandalwood paste. Her love and prayers give the mold life, and he comes to life as Ganesh. As a child, Ganesh is playful, engaging in mischief with Nandi Maharaj.

One day, Parvati asks Ganesh to guard the palace while she bathes, and he promises not to let anybody in. When Shiva comes by, Ganesh does not allow him in because he will not disobey his mother under any circumstances. Even Brahma is unable to get Ganesh to budge. Shiva begins his tandava in extreme divine play of fury and wrath. From the ocean, the ultimate power, the gods Vishnu and Lakshmi decide to go to Kailash to calm down Shiva. They arrive to Kailash just as Shiva cuts off Ganesh's head with his trident.

When Parvati hears what Shiva did, she tells Shiva that she wants her son returned as is or else she will give up her life, too. Because Shiva's trident is all powerful, Brahma says the only way to revive Ganesh is to attach the head of another child onto Ganesh's body. Shiva orders his attendants to bring him the head of another child so they can revive Ganesh. Shiva's attendants come back with the head of a baby elephant. They attach the head and Ganesh is revived. He is eternally existent in such form, however this is a divine play for all. Parvati becomes sad thinking that everyone will mock him, but Brahma promises that for eras to come, people will worship Ganesh. Lakshmi gives a boon that Ganesh will be worshiped at the beginning of any auspicious occasion, and Vishnu gives a boon that Ganesh will be the symbol of wisdom and wealth, and that everyone will offer him laddu. Shiva appoints him the head of his warrior army.

Ganesh grows up and engages in mischief with Mooshkam (his vahana) and Nandi. One day, Rishi Parshuram comes to visit Shiva, and Ganesh tells him he cannot because Shiva is amidst prayer. In anger, Parshuram throws a weapon at Ganesh, which breaks his tusk.

One time, a demon named Śūrapadmā pleases Shiva with his devotion, so Shiva offers him a boon. Surkdaman asks for the power so that no entity can defeat him. With his invincibility, the demon begins to torment the gods in the heavens and holds them hostage. Surkdaman threatens the water god Varuna to stop bringing rain clouds to southern India because Indra is hiding somewhere there. Without rain, the region suffers from a drought, and the sage Agastya prays to Brahma to bring an end to Surkdaman's torment. Pleased with Agastya's devotion, Brahma appears and advises Agastya to visit Shiva in Kailash, as Ganga, the personification of the Ganges river, flows from Shiva's hair. Shiva gives Agastya holy water from Ganga. Ganesha is intrigued by the sage and secretly follows him back to South India. Back in South India, when Agastya rests, Ganesh becomes impatient and worries for the animals and people living without water. Ganesh disguises himself as a crow and tips over the pot with the holy water. Agastya becomes angry and begins cursing the crow, so he transforms into Ganesh again and shows Agastya a flowing river emerging from the fallen pot of water. Ganesh promises Agastya that water will flow from this, the river Kaveri for years to come.

Ganesh loves his little brother Kartikeya, who is a fierce warrior. One day, the sage Narada sets up a competition between the two brothers to see who is more powerful. He challenges them both to circle the world three times; whichever brother completes the task first will be deemed the winner. Ganesh circles around his parents three times, explaining to Narada that sacred circling of his parents in respect is akin to circling the world as that is what they are. He gives the winning garland to Kartikeya, impressed by his strength.

One night, Ganesh is riding on Mooshak, who trips on a snake and causes Ganesh to fall. The moon god Chandra laughs at the incident, mocking Ganesh's large belly. Ganesh curses him that he will never shine brightly again. Chandra begs for forgiveness, and Ganesh explains to him that it is not becoming of a deity to make fun of others' appearance. Ganesh cannot undo the curse, but tells Chandra that his light will gradually appear and disappear.

Kubera, the god of wealth, comes to Kailash to invite Shiva and Parvati to visit his palace for a dinner. Shiva realizes that Kubera only wants to show off his wealth, so he declines the invitation. Shiva tells Kubera that Ganesh can visit, and so Ganesh goes back with Kubera to his palace. There, Ganesh keeps eating and Kubera becomes scared he will run out of food. He apologizes to Shiva for becoming prideful about his wealth, having learned his lesson.

One day, Tarkasur challenges Kartikeya in a battle. Ganesh says that Kartikeya will destroy the demon. Kartikeya battles Tarkasur, and with Ganesh's help, defeats him in battle.

== Voice cast ==
- Ashar Shaikh as Ganesha
- Adarsh Gautam as Shiva
- Namrata Sawhney as Parvati
- Jai Prakash Singh as Brahma, Kubera, snake
- Jignesh as Vishnu
- Neshma Mantri as Lakshmi
- Taran as Kartikeya
- Dhananjay as Varuna
- Pankaj Sharma as Indra
- Rajanika Ganguli as Mushak
- Jitendra Jaiswal as Nandi
- Mihir Chakraborty as Agastya
- Nitin Malhotra as Narada
- Bharat Swatantra as Tarkasur
- Vikas Goswami as Parshurama
- Parminder Ghumman as Śūrapadmā

== Soundtrack ==
The soundtrack was composed by Shamir Tandon.

- Aao Sunaata Hoon Sabko - Hariharan
- Ganaa Ganaa Di - Shankar Mahadevan
- Haathi Ka Bal Hai - Sanchita Bhattacharya
- Adhabhut Sankalp - Hema Desai
- Nanha Munna Bal Ganesh - Asha Bhosle, Usha Mangeshkar
- Shankarji IKa Damroo Baje - Kailash Kher
- Teeno Lok Me Pooja Jaye - Asha Bhosle, Amaanat, Aneek

== Critical reception ==
Ameeta Gupta of Rediff.com gave the film 2.5/5, writing, "Overall, Bal Ganesh is a good effort, and worth a watch." Taran Adarsh of Bollywood Hungama gave the film 2.5 stars out of 5, writing, "On the whole, BAL GANESH is an interesting celluloid experience that should attract kids by the dozens."

== Sequels ==
A sequel directed by Vijay S. Bhanushali, Bal Ganesh 2, released on 23 October 2009. Another direct-to-video sequel by Bhanushali, Bal Ganesh 3, was released on 18 September 2015. The film Bal Ganesh and the PomZom Planet, also by Bhanushali followed in 2017. A web series, titled Bal Ganesh Ki Paathshala, was released in 2020 which shows Ganesha explaining various Indian festivals and traditions to kids.

== See also ==
- List of Indian animated feature films
