= Dhruvva =

Indian actor

- Occupation: Actor
- Years active: 2015–2023

Dhruvva is a former Indian actor who works in Tamil films. He is best known for Thilagar (2015) co-starring Kishore and Marainthirunthu Paarkum Marmam Enna (2018).

== Career ==
Dhruvva was an architect in the United States, decided to pursue films and enrolling in a filmmaking course before moving to India. To prepare for his role in Thilagar, he stayed in a village in 2014 observing the local accent and traveled on bicycle. Regarding his performance in the film, a critic wrote that "Dhruva impresses with his looks but the actor struggles hard to emote and he should work on his dialogue delivery as well" and another critic wrote that "New comer Dhruwa comes as a happy, college going lad in the first half and scores better in the second half as a transformed man. With his hunk physique and sharp looks, he stands tall through the post interval session and pulls off the angry young man character like an expert". The film released to mixed reviews and was a box office failure although the film ran well in the southern districts of Tamil Nadu due to the film's setting in Tirunelveli. Dhruvva attributed the film's failure to censor cuts.

In 2016, he signed the films Devadas Brothers and Marainthirunthu Paarkum Marmam Enna and the short Maalai Neram. Maalai Neram was expanded into a feature film and renamed Kadhal Kasakuthaiya, which released in 2017 to negative reviews. Marainthirunthu Paarkum Marmam Enna (2018) released to average reviews. Regarding his performance in that film, a critic wrote that "Dhruva performs well as the gas delivery boy Ayyapan, who revolts when his mother (Saranya Ponvannan) and wife (Anjana) became victims of chain-snatching. He is equally impressive in action scenes". Devadas Brothers, which a delayed release in 2021 and had him paired opposite Sanchita Shetty, released to negative reviews.

== Filmography ==
Year	Film	Role	Notes
2015	Thilagar	Thilagar	
2017	Kadhal Kasakuthaiya	Arjun	
2018	Marainthirunthu Paarkum Marmam Enna	Japan (Aiyappan)	
2021	Devadas Brothers	Ram	
2023	Tamil Kudimagan	Sudalaiyandi’s son	
