= Thilagar =

2015 Indian film by Perumal Pillai

- Poster
- Directed by: G. Peruma Pillai
- Produced by: V. Mathiyalagan; R. Ramya; R. Rajesh
- Starring: Kishore; Dhruvva; Mrudhula Bhaskar; Anumol
- Cinematography: Rajesh K. Narayanan
- Edited by: Kola Bhaskar
- Music by: Kannan
- Production companies: Finger Print Pictures; Etcetera Entertainment
- Release date: 20 March 2015
- Running time: 117 mins
- Country: India
- Language: Tamil

Thilagar is a 2015 Indian Tamil-language action-drama film written and directed by Perumal Pillai. The film stars Kishore and Dhruvva in the lead roles while Mrudhula Bhaskar, Anumol and Ram among others form an ensemble cast. Music composed by Kannan, cinematography by Rajeshyadav the film opened on 20 March 2015.

== Plot synopsis ==
Due to ideological differences, Ukkirapandi brutally murders Bose Pandian, the head of the village. Bose Pandian's brother Thilagar, a kind and peace-loving person, vows to seek revenge against Ukkirapandi and his sons.

== Cast ==
- Kishore as Bose Pandian
- Dhruvva as Thilagar
- Mrudhula Bhaskar
- Anumol
- Poo Ramu as Ukkirapandi
- Rajesh K. Narayanan
- Sujatha Master
- Neetu Chandra as item number "Bim Bam Bim"

== Production ==
Perumal Pillai revealed that the film was based on a real-life incident from the 1990s, which revolved around two opposition clans in South Tamil Nadu. The film was predominantly shot around Tirunelveli, while the team also managed to feature a Dussehra festival live in Thiruchendur, as a part of the script. Dhruvva, a debutant actor from the US, was cast in the title role of the film, while Mrudhula Bhaskar was signed on as the female lead. In preparation for her role, she researched her character by looking up similar roles played by actress Sripriya. An item number featuring Neetu Chandra was shot at Binny Mills to increase the film's commercial viability. The film held a press meet for the launch of its trailer and soundtrack in September 2014. During the launch, director Ameer criticised the makers of the film for adopting the title Thilagar for an action film, stating it instead should have been used for a biopic of Bal Gangadhar Tilak. In return, Perumal Pillai expressed his disappointment at Ameer's remark and retorted that Ameer's Raam (2005) had no link to the Ramayana.

== Soundtrack ==
The soundtrack was composed by Kannan.

Track listing
| No. | Title | Singer(s) | Length |
|---|---|---|---|
| 1. | "Vellavi Manasu" | Shankar Mahadevan, Padaiypaa Sriram | 5:27 |
| 2. | "Verichu Verichu" | Haricharan, Shweta Mohan | 4:20 |
| 3. | "Uppu Kaatha" | Chinna Ponnu | 1:48 |
| 4. | "Bim Bam Bam" | Priya, Charulatha | 4:14 |
| 5. | "Oorellam Vettu Satham" | Mukesh Mohamed, Anita | 3:22 |
| 6. | "Eesal Pole" | Padaiypaa Sriram | 1:46 |
| 7. | "Kadamai Ondru" | Ananth Vaidhyanathan | 2:49 |
| 8. | "Aanai Koottam" | Srinivas | 1:53 |

== Release ==
The film opened in March 2015. A critic from Sify stated that "what prevent Thilagar from being a classic is the unwanted romantic track, loud melodrama and abrupt ending", giving it an "average" verdict. The Hindu noted that the film had a "lot of gun powder, but no explosion".
