= Sing If You Can =

- Genre: Game show
- Presented by: Keith Lemon; Stacey Solomon
- Country of origin: United Kingdom
- Original language: English
- No. of series: 1
- No. of episodes: 6

Production
- Running time: 60 minutes (inc. adverts)
- Production company: RDF Television

Original release
- Network: ITV
- Release: 16 April – 21 May 2011

Sing If You Can is a British game show broadcast on ITV. It features celebrities attempting to sing in front of a live studio audience whilst various attempts are made to disrupt their performances. It is presented by Keith Lemon and Stacey Solomon, though originally Vernon Kay was scheduled to host, but he felt that it would be better hosted by a comedian. The show was sponsored by Argos, supporting the charity Teenage Cancer Trust.

== Format ==
Six celebrities are divided into two teams, each with a captain. After the celebrity has performed, a three-person judging panel views their thoughts. After all six celebrities have performed, the audience vote to decide which team wins. The losing team captain is dropped into a tank of water, and the winning team then perform a final song on a spinning stage. The amount of money to be donated to charity increases as the stage spins, and the longer the celebrities stay on the stage, the more money they win. The show raised money for the Teenage Cancer Trust.

== Episodes ==
=== Episode 1 ===
Judging panel

- Coleen Nolan
- Shaun Ryder
- Dave Gorman

Red team – Team Gabriella	Jodie Prenger (Captain)	Brendan Cole	Brigitte Nielsen
Blue team – Team Troy	Zoe Birkett (Captain)	Jonathan Ansell	Andrew Stone

Song	Contestant(s)	Distraction
"Back to Black"	Brigitte Nielsen; Zoe Birkett	Knife Throwing
"Rescue Me"	Jodie Prenger	Snakes
"Ave Maria"	Jonathan Ansell	Balloons Popping
"Born to Be Wild"	Andrew Stone; Brendan Cole	Various Shaking Floors; Gunge and Feathers
"Firework"	Jonathan Ansell	No Distraction
"Only Girl (In the World)"	Brigitte Nielsen	No Distraction
"Walking on Sunshine"	Jodie Prenger; Brigitte Nielsen; Brendan Cole	Spinning Stage

=== Episode 2 ===
Judging panel

- Caroline Flack
- John Thomson
- Rob Rouse

Red team – Team Mash	Ricky Groves (Captain)	Brenda Edwards	Sheila Ferguson
Blue team – Team Bangers	Gemma Merna (Captain)	Shaun Williamson	Matt Stevens

Song	Contestant(s)	Distraction
"I'm Still Standing"	Matt Stevens	Children; Morris Dancers; Gymnasts; Rugby Team on a Bouncy Castle
"Don't Leave Me This Way"	Shaun Williamson; Ricky Groves	Waxing
"Respect"	Brenda Edwards	Bike Stunts
"One Way Or Another"	Gemma Merna; Sheila Ferguson	Feet in: Yesterdays Breakfast; Clawed Frogs; Blood Worms; Crabs; Freezing Slush; Sewer Maggots; Snapping Crayfish
"Just Dance"	Brenda Edwards	No Distraction
"Bad Romance"	Shaun Williamson	No Distraction
"I Predict A Riot"	Gemma Merna; Shaun Williamson; Matt Stevens	Spinning Stage

=== Episode 3 ===
Judging panel

- Jarred Christmas
- Jamelia
- Richard Bacon

Red team – Team Darth Vadar	Rodney Marsh (Captain)	Lisa Maxwell	Mikey Graham
Blue team – Team Luke Skywalker	Darren Gough (Captain)	Ray Quinn	Camilla Kerslake

Song	Contestant(s)	Distraction
"Do You Love Me"	Darren Gough; Mikey Graham	Dance routine in inflatable costumes
"The Only Way Is Up"	Lisa Maxwell	Dressed as a fox dropped in bins with feathers paint etc.
"Parklife"	Rodney Marsh; Ray Quinn	Join a dog show
"Stay"	Camilla Kerslake	Different weather (rain, wind etc.)
"Toxic"	Lisa Maxwell	No Distraction
"She Said"	Ray Quinn	No Distraction
"Valerie"	Darren Gough; Ray Quinn; Camilla Kerslake	Spinning Stage

=== Episode 4 ===
Judging panel

- Trevor Nelson
- Rachel Stevens
- Louis Walsh

Red team – Team He-Man	Toyah Willcox (Captain)	Sian Reeves	Ben Richards
Blue team – Team Skeletor	Faye Tozer (Captain)	Sinitta	Jedward

Song	Contestant(s)	Distraction
"Fight for This Love"	Faye Tozer; Toyah Willcox	Shaolin stunts
"Mercy"	Ben Richards; Jedward	Electrocution gunge
"Rehab"	Sian Reeves	Drinking disgusting cocktails (Pig nipple lamb brain, etc.)
"Everyday I Love You Less and Less"	Sinitta	Different weather (whilst sitting in a car because she had broken her ankle)
"Grenade"	Ben Richards	No distractions
"Tik Tok"	Faye Tozer; Jedward as Backing Dancers	No distractions
"I Don't Feel Like Dancin'"	Faye Tozer; Jedward*	Spinning stage

(*Sinitta could not participate as she had broken her ankle)

=== Episode 5 ===
Judging panel

- Patsy Palmer
- Rob Deering
- Ronni Ancona

Red team – Team Posh	Tricia Penrose (Captain)	Chesney Hawkes	Martin Bayfield
Blue team – Team Scary	Craig Doyle (Captain)	Leanne Jones	Roxanne Pallett

Song	Contestant(s)	Distraction
"All Time Low"	Roxanne Pallett	Walk of fear
"Dizzy"	Tricia Penrose; Leanne Jones	Spinning wheels
"Faith"	Craig Doyle; Martin Bayfield	Disgusting cocktails
"Fire"	Chesney Hawkes	Erupting volcano
"Angels"	Martin Bayfield	No distraction
"Buttons"	Roxanne Pallett	No distraction
"Roll With It"	Tricia Penrose; Martin Bayfield; Chesney Hawkes	Spinning stage

=== Episode 6 – The Finale ===
Judging panel

- Samantha Womack
- Rob Rouse
- Sara Cox

Red team – Team Gabriella	Brigitte Nielsen (Captain)	Brendan Cole	Jodie Prenger
Blue team – Team Luke Skywalker	Darren Gough (Captain)	Ray Quinn	Camilla Kerslake

Song	Contestant(s)	Distraction
"Sex on Fire"	Ray Quinn	Snakes
"Don't Stop Me Now"	Jodie Prenger; Camilla Kerslake	Break dancers
"Why Does It Always Rain on Me?"	Brendan Cole	Different weather
"House of Fun"	Brigitte Nielson; Darren Gough	Dogs
"Rolling in the Deep"	Jodie Prenger	No distraction
"Closer"	Camilla Kerslake	No distraction
"Is This the Way to Amarillo"	Darren Gough; Ray Quinn; Camilla Kerslake	Spinning stage
"Son of a Preacher Man"	Stacey Solomon	Bike stunts

== Reception ==
Reviews have been mainly negative. The Guardian TV critic Grace Dent was scathing about the show, calling it "the worst TV programme ever made". Daily Mirror columnist Kevin O'Sullivan called it "gormless garbage" and "mind-numbingly banal".

== International versions ==
Most international versions of Twist and Shout, Sing If You Can, and Killer Karaoke which are sent and licensed by Zodiak Rights (now Banijay).

Country	Name	Hosts	Network	Date premiered
(Arab League) Arab World	Killer Karaoke غني لو تقدر	Ahmed El-Fishawy; Cynthia Khalifeh	AlHayat 1 MTV Lebanon; Abu Dhabi TV	26 March 2014 (Hayat 1); 30 March 2014 (MTV); 27 March 2014 (Abu Dhabi TV)
Argentina	Canta si Puedes	José María Listorti	Canal 13	18 January 2016
Brazil	Cante se Puder	Patrícia Abravanel; Márcio Ballas	SBT	18 January 2012
Cambodia	Killer Karaoke Cambodia	Chea Vibol; Sun Visal	Hang Meas HDTV	19 September 2015
Chile	Killer Karaoke	Cristián Sánchez; Sergio Freire	Chilevisión	10 October 2013
Colombia	Karaoke Asesino	Sebastián Villalobos	RCN	23 May 2015
Czech Republic	Killer Karaoke	?	TV Barrandov	2013
Ecuador	Canta si Puedes	Fabrizzio Ferretti; Erika Vélez	Ecuavisa	24 March 2013
France	Chante Si Tu Peux	Bruno Guillon	Virgin 17	2009
Germany	Sing! Wenn du kannst	Sonja Zietlow	RTL II	19 April 2011
Hungary	Killer Karaoke	?	TV2	2016
India	Twist and Shout	?	StarPlus	2009
India	Y this Kolaveri (Tamil)	RJ Balaji	Zee Tamizh	14 December 2013
India	Killerr Karaoke Atka Toh Latkah (Hindi)	Krushna Abhishek	&TV	7 March 2015
Indonesia	Twist and Shout	Okky Lukman	TPI	2009
Indonesia	Killer Karaoke Indonesia	Raffi Ahmad	antv	27 October 2018
Italy	Scanzonissima	Gigi & Ross	Rai 2	16 May 2018
Kazakhstan	Караоке Киллер	Daulet Bijanov	NTK-TV	2014
Lithuania	Dainuok, jei gali	Algis Ramanauskas; Rimantė Kulvinskytė	LNK	25 September 2011
Lebanon	Twist & Shout	?	LBC	2009
Mexico	Karaoke, Canta y No Te Rajes	Carlos Trillo	Televisa	2 September 2013
Mongolia	Killer Karaoke	Sodkhuu Urtnasan	Central Television	17 September 2023
Netherlands	Killer Karaoke	Dennis Weening; Jan Kooijman	RTL5	2013
Norway	Killer Karaoke	Anders Hoff; Øyvind Rafto	TVNorge	12 September 2013
Peru	Canta si Puedes	Raúl Romero	América Televisión	31 August 2011
Philippines	Twist And Shout (original format)	Gary Valenciano; Martin Nievera	ABS-CBN	3 July 2010
Philippines	Killer Karaoke Pinoy Naman	Michael V. Erika Padilla	TV5	16 November 2013
Poland	Kilerskie karaoke	Krzysztof Jankowski "Jankes" (Note: Judging panel: Magdalena Schejbal, Katarzyna Kwiatkowska, Igor Nurczyński.)	Eska TV	7 October 2012
Portugal	Cante... Se Puder	César Mourão; Andreia Rodrigues	SIC	28 July 2013
Romania	Cântă dacă poți	Jorge & Alina Crișan	Antena 1	8 December 2009
Romania	Killer Karaoke România	Ștefan Stan	Prima TV	2013
Russia	Караоке Киллер	Maxim Golopolosov	Ю	18 March 2013
Spain	Canta si puedes	Óscar Martínez	Antena 3	2009
Spain	Killer Karaoke	Patricia Conde; Florentino Fernández	Cuatro	5 November 2014
Thailand	Killer Karaoke Thailand ขอร้อง อย่าหยุดร้อง	Chakrit Yamnam; Ball Chernyim	Modernine TV	5 August 2013
Thailand	Sing If You Can ร้องห้ามเลิก	Pisanu Nimsakul; Sakuntala Teinpairoj	Channel 7HD	1 February 2020
Turkey	Twist & Shout	?	ATV	2009
Turkey	İmkansız Karaoke	İrfan Kangı	Fox	1 January 2013
Ukraine	Спiвай, якщо зможеш	Sergey Pritula and Masha Efrosinina (2011); DZIDZIO and Alyena Musienko (2013)	Novyi Kanal	2011; 2 September 2013
United States	Killer Karaoke	Steve-O (2012); Mark McGrath (2014)	truTV	23 November 2012; 2 February 2014
Vietnam	Tôi dám hát	Tùng Leo	SCTV2	26 June 2013
Vietnam	Đố ai hát được	Phạm Anh Khoa	VTV3	29 December 2013
Vietnam	Ai dám hát	Ngô Kiến Huy	HTV7	4 June 2014

Notes

1. In India, the Tamil show Y this Kolaveri is loosely based on Killer Karaoke/Sing If You Can, as it deals with participants having to sing while avoiding challenging situations. Unlike its American counterpart, the obstacles in this show are far less severe and are restricted to conditions like "standing on a two-tonne block of ice" and "walking blindfolded through a cactus maze".
2. In Indonesia and Portugal, both Indonesian and Portuguese versions are based on the Killer Karaoke format, this show is in collaboration with the production of Fremantle.
