= Jiyen Krishnakumar =

Indian film director

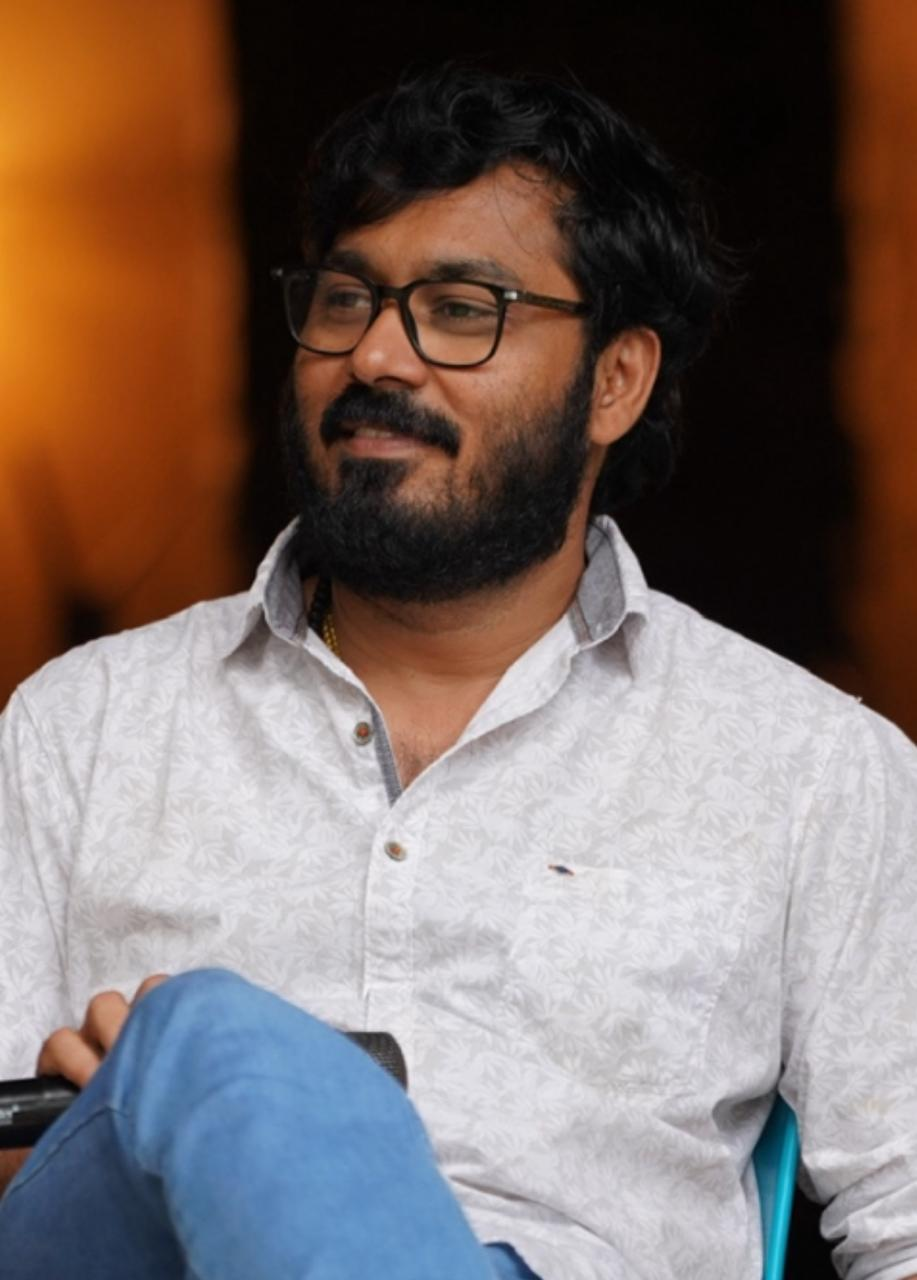
- Photo taken at the set of Ananthankaadu Movie Set
- Born: Kerala, India
- Other name: G. N. Krishnakumar
- Occupation: Film director
- Years active: 2010-present

Jiyen Krishnakumar is an Indian film director who has worked on Malayalam and Tamil language films. He became known for the crime thriller College Days (2010), and has gone on to make feature films including Kaanchi (2013), socio-political action thriller Tiyaan (2017), Tamil thriller Run Baby Run (2023), mystery drama Ayel (2024), and Malayalam-Tamil bilingual political thriller Ananthan Kaadu (2026), produced by Mini Studio.

== Career ==
Jiyen Krishnakumar began his career working on Malayalam films, notably making two films with Indrajith Sukumaran — College Days (2010) and Kaanchi (2013). His third film Tiyaan (2017), was produced on a larger budget, and featured Prithviraj in the leading role alongside Indrajith. With minimal promotions, the film opened to mixed reviews from critics. In 2023, Jiyen's first Tamil film Run Baby Run starring RJ Balaji and Aishwarya Rajesh was released.

His next release will be Paramaguru, an action drama film starring Sasikumar in the lead role. The film began production in 2019 and was delayed owing to the COVID-19 pandemic. He has also agreed terms to work on another film for Prince Pictures following the favourable response to Run Baby Run.

== Filmography ==
Year	Film	Writer	Language	Notes
2010	College Days	Himself	Malayalam	
2013	Kaanchi	B. Jeyamohan	Malayalam	
2017	Tiyaan	Murali Gopy	Malayalam	
2023	Run Baby Run	Himself	Tamil	
2026	Ananthan Kaadu	Murali Gopy	Malayalam; Tamil	
TBA	Ayel	Himself	Malayalam	Post Production
TBA	Paramaguru	Himself	Tamil	Post Production
TBA	Untitled Prince Pictures Next Project	Himself	Tamil	Announced
