= Oppam (soundtrack) =

2016 soundtrack album by 4 Musics

Soundtrack album by 4 Musics
- Released: 17 August 2016
- Recorded: 2016
- Studios: Noise Head Quarters, Kochi
- Length: 28:22
- Languages: Malayalam, Hindi
- Label: Satyam Audios
- Producer: 4 Musics

4 Musics chronology
Just Married (2015)	Oppam (2016)	Villain (2017)

Oppam is a feature film soundtrack for the 2016 film of the same name directed by Priyadarshan and starred Mohanlal in the lead role. The film's six-song soundtrack was composed by 4 Musics (a group consisting of Jim Jacob, Biby Matthew, Eldhose Alias, and Justin James), and featured lyrics written by Madhu Vasudevan, B. K. Harinarayanan and Sharon Joseph. The original score was composed by Ron Ethan Yohann in his Malayalam-film debut. The soundtrack album was released on the Satyam Audios label on 17 August 2016. The music was well received by critics and audiences, with the songs "Chinnamma Adi" and "Minungum Minnaminuge" becoming chartbusters.

== Background and recording ==
Producer Antony Perumbavoor suggested 4 Musics, who had only one film credit (Just Married), to Priyadarshan; the director gave them three situations and one week to return with three options for each. The group began working on the film during December 2015. The songs were recorded, mixed, and mastered at Jacob's Noise Headquarters in Kochi. Alias and James were abroad while composing, and the team worked on the music via WhatsApp and Skype.

Ron Yohann scored the theme music based on the character descriptions. He started working on the score after editing was completed by the end of July, first spotting the film.

== Composition ==
"Chinnamma Adi" was sung by M. G. Sreekumar and written by Madhu Vasudevan. Priyadarshan wanted its first line to begin with a name, and "Chinnamma" was added. For the second verse, Mohanlal insisted on "Kukkumma" (the pet name of actress Sukumari, as a tribute to her). Along with "Chinnamma Adi", Sreekumar recorded for three of the tracks, which included "Minungum Minnaminuge" with Sreya Jayadeep, "Pala Naallayi" which was collaborated with a ten-voice ensemble and "Chirimukilum".

"Minungum Minnaminuge" was written by B. K. Harinarayanan when his mother was in hospital, and his thoughts about how she cared for him were reflected in the song. Its lyrics were written after the melody was composed, and the song's position in the film was described by Priyadarshan. The song also had a solo version, performed by Jayadeep. Sharon Joseph was recommended to 4 Musics by composer Mejo Joseph for writing the Hindi lyrics for "Pala Naallayi", and while she sang and recorded her compositions, and when 4 Musics heard her Hindi recording she was invited to sing the original as well.

"Chirimukilum" had both male and female versions, the latter was performed by Haritha Balakrishnan. Both of them were not included in the film; it was a tribute to composer S. P. Venkatesh, who had collaborated with Priyadarshan on some of his successful soundtracks and was written in Venkatesh's style.

== Track listing ==
No.	Title	Writer(s)	Artist(s)	Length
1.	"Chinnamma Adi"	Madhu Vasudevan	M. G. Sreekumar	4:06
2.	"Pala Naallayi"	Madhu Vasudevan, Sharon Joseph	M. G. Sreekumar, Najim Arshad, Anwar Sadath, Vipin Xavier, Biby Mathew, M. P. Gireesh Kumar, Haritha Balakrishnan, Sharon Joseph, Apaena	5:50
3.	"Minungum Minnaminuge" (Duet)	B. K. Harinarayanan	M. G. Sreekumar, Sreya Jayadeep	5:14
4.	"Chirimukilum" (Male version)	B. K. Harinarayanan	M. G. Sreekumar	4:19
5.	"Minungum Minnaminuge" (Solo)	B. K. Harinarayanan	Shreya Jayadeep	5:14
6.	"Chirimukilum" (Female version)	B. K. Harinarayanan	Haritha Balakrishnan	4:19
Total length:				28:22

== Reception ==
In a soundtrack review, The Times of India's Deepa Soman wrote that "the songs have tried to mix in all elements a listener is looking for – emotion, celebration and class". She described "Chinnamma Adi" as a "playful-yet-classical song" and "also has a few dollops of western classical music thrown in, and is a fun listen", "Pala Naallayi" is "a celebration song with a lot of percussion and joyful chorus", "Chirimukilum" is a "free-flowing song filled with melancholy [...] though it can't boast of great emotional allure or range, the lyrics can touch you by its simple, poignant philosophy" and "Minungum Minnaminuge" as "probably the best of the lot" that "tenderly expresses the sweet relationship between a father and daughter".

Srivatsan said for India Today, "Oppam has some extraordinary tracks [...] though the song 'Chinnamma Adi' makes you tap your foot, it is 'Minungum Minnaminuge' that becomes an instant addiction". Padmakumar K. of Malayala Manorama wrote about "Chinnamma Adi", "The rhythm, milieu and the camera work complemented the whole mood of the song [...] 4 Musics successfully fused melody with a blend of folk and the classical styles". Anu James of the International Business Times wrote, "The party song, 'Pala Naalayi', is colourful, with good choreography and visuals". Athira M. of The Hindu said about "Chinnamma Adi", "It has a classical touch, but with a foot-tapping beat".

Anna M. M. Vetticad of Firstpost described "Chinnamma Adi" as "infectiously rhythmic" and "Minungum Minnaminuge" as "serenely melodic". Goutham VS of The Indian Express felt the songs were "still not catchy" but praised Sreekumar's vocals whereas he described the background score "maintain a tensed mood" throughout the film.

"Chinnamma Adi" and "Minungum Minnaminuge" were included in The Hindu's list of the most-successful Malayalam songs of 2016. Of the year's most-viewed Malayalam video songs in YouTube, "Minungum Minnaminuge" was awarded the second place and "Chinnamma Adi" the sixth.

== Accolades ==
Award	Date of ceremony	Category	Nominee(s)	Result	Ref.
Asianet Film Awards	20 January 2017	Best Music Director	4 Musics	Won	
Asianet Film Awards	20 January 2017	Best Lyricist	B. K. Harinarayanan	Won	
Asiavision Awards	18 November 2016	Best Singer – Male	M. G. Sreekumar (for "Chinnamma Adi")	Won	
Asiavision Awards	18 November 2016	Best Lyricist	B. K. Harinarayanan	Won	
Asiavision Awards	18 November 2016	New Sensation in Singing	Sreya Jayadeep	Won	
Filmfare Awards South	17 June 2017	Best Lyricist – Malayalam	Madhu Vasudevan (for "Chinnamma Adi")	Won	
Filmfare Awards South	17 June 2017	Best Lyricist – Malayalam	B. K. Harinarayanan (for "Minungum Minnaminuge")	Nominated	
Filmfare Awards South	17 June 2017	Best Male Playback Singer – Malayalam	M. G. Sreekumar (for "Chinnamma Adi")	Won	
IIFA Utsavam	28 – 29 March 2017	Music Direction	4 Musics	Nominated	
IIFA Utsavam	28 – 29 March 2017	Playback Singer – Female	Sreya Jayadeep	Won	
South Indian International Movie Awards	30 June 2017	Best Lyricist	B. K. Harinarayanan (for "Minungum Minnaminuge")	Nominated	
South Indian International Movie Awards	30 June 2017	Best Playback Singer (Male)	M. G. Sreekumar (for "Chinnamma Adi")	Nominated	
South Indian International Movie Awards	30 June 2017	Best Playback Singer (Female)	Sreya Jayadeep (for "Minungum Minnaminuge")	Nominated	
Vanitha Film Awards	12 February 2017	Best Male Singer	M. G. Sreekumar (for "Chinnamma Adi")	Won	
