= Mookuthi Amman 2 =

2026 film by Sundar C

- Theatrical release poster
- Directed by: Sundar C
- Written by: Sundar C; Venkat Raghavan
- Produced by: Ishari K. Ganesh; Khushbu Sundar; Kushmitha Ganesh; Vignesh Shivan; Ishan Saksena
- Starring: Nayanthara; Regena Cassandrra; Duniya Vijay; Urvashi
- Cinematography: Gopi Amarnath
- Edited by: Fenny Oliver
- Music by: Hiphop Tamizha
- Production companies: Vels Film International; Avni Cinemax; Rowdy Pictures
- Distributed by: see below
- Release date: 6 November 2026
- Running time: 144 minutes
- Country: India
- Language: Tamil
- Budget: ₹90–100 crore

Mookuthi Amman 2 (Note: Full title: Mookuthi Amman 2 – Maha Sakthi.) (transl. Nose-Ring Goddess 2) is a 2026 Indian Tamil-language fantasy action thriller film directed and co-written by Sundar C. It is jointly produced by Vels Film International, Avni Cinemax and Rowdy Pictures. A spiritual successor to Mookuthi Amman (2020), the film stars Nayanthara in dual role, Regena Cassandrra and Duniya Vijay (in his Tamil debut) with Urvashi, Ramachandra Raju, Sunil, Myna Nandhini, Ineya, Yogi Babu and others in supporting roles.

Shot between March and December 2025, Mookuthi Amman 2 was released on 6 November 2026, in the week of Diwali and received mixed review from critics.

== Plot ==
The story of Mookuthi Amman 2 begins two thousand years ago in an ancient kingdom. When the realm is brutally invaded by dark forces, a desperate queen sacrifices her life to the supreme deity, Mahashakthi, to save her infant prince. The Goddess descends, destroying the dark army and killing a powerful demonic sorcerer. Watching her husband die, the sorcerer's wife, a ruthless witch named Bhairavi, swears a multi-generational oath of vengeance, vowing to return when the planets align to destroy the Goddess.

In the present day, Shakthi is a timid police constable living an ordinary life with her adopted mother, Mala. However, Shakthi is constantly tormented by vivid nightmares of an ancient sacrifice, a warrior on horseback, and a mysterious, fog-shrouded village called Mailanji. Driven by an unexplainable pull, Shakthi gets herself transferred to this remote village, and Mala accompanies her.

Unbeknownst to them, the 2,000-year planetary cycle has completed, and Bhairavi has resurfaced to fulfill her vow. To establish her dark empire, Bhairavi aligns herself with a corrupt, ruthless local politician and a deceptive fraudulent spiritual leader named Swami. Together, they use black magic and political muscle to terrorise Mailanji. As Shakthi investigates the strange, paranormal events in the area, she frequently clashes with the politician's men. Every time she faces a life-or-death situation, a dormant, superhuman energy surges within her to protect her.

Bhairavi soon discovers that Shakthi is the human vessel harboring the soul of her ancient enemy. Seeking to eliminate her before she fully awakens, Bhairavi and the politician launch a massive occult ambush, endangering the village and capturing Mala. Trapped at the local temple amidst the chaos, Shakthi's past-life memories fully unlock. Realising she is the literal human incarnation of the guardian deity Mookuthi Amman, she undergoes a divine transformation, stepping into her majestic goddess form.

In the final battle, Bhairavi summons demonic entities and channels dark magic, while the politician uses brute physical force to stop her. Mookuthi Amman unleashes her divine power, systematically dismantling the politician's empire and exposing the fraudulent Swami. In a final magical duel, Amman uses her trident to obliterate Bhairavi, breaking the ancient curse, restoring peace to Mailanji, and returning to the divine realm.

== Cast ==
- Nayanthara as:
  - Mookuthi Amman, Goddess of Vallanadu
  - Constable Shakthi
- Regena Cassandrra as Bhairavi
- Duniya Vijay as:
  - Ranadheeran
  - Rudhra
- Urvashi as Maala
- Yogi Babu as Landlord
- Sunil as Rajasimman (evil priest)
- Myna Nandhini as Nandhini
- Ramachandra Raju as Badhra (evil priest)
- Abhinaya as Princess Devi
- Ineya as Sumathi
- Pala. Karuppiah as Minister
- Arjai as Devi's husband
- Singampuli as Constable
- Jayashri Chaki as Jaya, Constable's wife
- Varshini Venkat as Landlord's bride
- Vichu Viswanath as Villager
- Swaminathan as Landlord's uncle
- Venkat Ragavan as Inspector
- Raj Kapoor as DSP
- Nithin Sathya as Badhra's son
- Y. G. Mahendran as Matadipathi Jayadevar
- Anandhi Ajay as Anandhi
- VJ Ashiq as Groom
- Khushbu Sundar as Goddess of Melnaadu (Cameo appearance)
- Sneha as Goddess of Nadunaadu (Cameo appearance)

== Production ==
In May 2024, it was rumoured that actor-director RJ Balaji was planning for a sequel to his directorial debut film Mookuthi Amman (2020), with Trisha Krishnan replacing Nayanthara in the title role. Balaji was reported to have also approached Shruti Haasan for the lead role in the sequel, as Balaji was initially interested to cast her in the lead role for Mookuthi Amman before Nayanthara. To silence such speculations that either Trisha or Haasan would be replacing Nayanthara, Vels Film International, on 12 July 2024, confirmed Nayanthara would reprise her role in the sequel.

In September 2024, it was officially announced that Sundar C would direct the sequel, titled Mookuthi Amman 2 which would be jointly produced by Vels Film International, Rowdy Pictures and Avni Cinemax. Balaji said he chose not to direct the sequel due to creative differences with the producers, and it was he who suggested Sundar as director. Produced on a large budget of ₹100 crore (US$11 million), the muhurat puja of the film took place on 6 March 2025, in Chennai. The entire filming wrapped that December. It has over 3000 visual effects shots, with 15 using AI.

== Music ==
Mookuthi Amman 2

Soundtrack album by Hiphop Tamizha
- Released: 28 October 2026
- Recorded: 2025–2026
- Genre: Feature Film Soundtrack
- Length: 13:17
- Label: Vels Music International

Hiphop Tamizha chronology
Meesaya Murukku 2 (2026)	Mookuthi Amman 2 (2026)
External audio
- Mookuthi Amman 2 – Official Audio Jukebox on YouTube

The soundtrack album and background score were composed by Hiphop Tamizha, in their sixth collaboration with Sundar C. The complete soundtrack album was released on 28 October 2026.

Track listing
No.	Title	Lyrics	Singer(s)	Length
1.	"Mahashakthi Trance"	Hiphop Tamizha	Aruna Ravindran, Hiphop Tamizha, Kaushik Krish	2:57
2.	"Bhairaa's Rebirth"	Hiphop Tamizha, Kaushik Krish	Kharesma Ravichandran, Hiphop Tamizha	2:09
3.	"Kolaar Max"	Vignesh Srikanth, Yuki Praveen, Madras Miran	Shreya Ghoshal, Hiphop Tamizha, Kaushik Krish	2:51
4.	"Raatchasa Raja"	Kaushik Krish	Kaushik Krish	1:09
5.	"Amman Song"	Muthamil	Aruna Ravindran, Chinnaponnu, Kaushik Krish	3:31
6.	"Rise of Mahasakthi"	–	–	0:42
Total length:				13:17

== Release ==
Mookuthi Amman 2 was released on 6 November 2026, during Diwali, clashing with Scene.

=== Distribution ===
Red Giant Movies distributed the film in Tamil Nadu, AA Films acquired the theatrical distribution rights for North India, and Home Screen Entertainment did so for Gulf countries. The Canadian distributor is York Cinemas. Overseas distribution in certain countries is handled by Ayngaran International.

=== Home media ===
Following its theatrical run, the film will began streaming on JioHotstar.

== Reception ==
=== Critical response ===
Manivasagan Namasivayam of DT Next praised its visual effects but criticised Cassandra's costume design and dialogue delivery style, along with the humour. Roopa Radhakrishnan of The Times of India criticized the weak screenplay, misplaced comedy tracks and poorly executed visual effects. Latha Srinivasan of NDTV wrote, "Mookuthi Amman 2 has the star power, scale and technical resources but it lacks a solid screenplay that brings these elements together beautifully". Yashaswini Sri of The Indian Express criticised the film for eschewing the satire of its predecessor in favour of "large-scale devotional fantasy", adding that "No amount of divine intervention can fix a screenplay that confuses scale with substance".

Sruthi Ganapathy Raman of The Hollywood Reporter India wrote, "Nayanthara tries her best to hold the fort, all through the dowdy VFX and ill-timed comedy tracks, allowing her character's innocence and rage to flow, even when the writing lets her down considerably". Sunanya Suresh of Variety India wrote, "The film moves between humor, horror, fantasy and devotional drama without establishing a consistent tonal identity. The result is an experience that is neither particularly funny nor sufficiently absorbing as a supernatural adventure". Bhuvanesh Chandar of The Hindu wrote that the film "makes you wonder who [Amman] needs saving from — the villain or dull filmmaking".

=== Box office ===
Ahead of the film's release, trade analyst Ganesh Aaglave predicted it would earn over ₹8 crore (US$850,000) domestically, though the opening would depend of the film's reception. It eventually collected under ₹1 crore (US$110,000) from morning shows on the opening day.
