= Kaanchi (2013 film) =

- Official poster
- Directed by: Jiyen Krishnakumar
- Written by: B. Jeyamohan
- Produced by: Haneef Muhammed
- Starring: Indrajith Sukumaran; Murali Gopy; Shine Tom Chacko; Archanna Guptaa
- Cinematography: Ravi Chandran
- Edited by: Babu Rathnam
- Music by: Ronnie Raphael
- Release date: 4 October 2013
- Country: India
- Language: Malayalam

Kaanchi (transl. Trigger) is a 2013 Indian Malayalam-language action drama film directed by Jiyen Krishnakumar and written by B. Jeyamohan, starring Indrajith Sukumaran, Murali Gopy, Shine Tom Chacko and Archanna Guptaa.

== Plot ==
The film follows the life of grocery store owner Madhavan, who lock horns with a powerful businessman name Peringodan Narayanan, where a revolver gun enters between their war.

== Cast ==
- Indrajith Sukumaran as Madhavan
- Murali Gopy as Peringodan Narayanan
- Archanna Guptaa as Gowri
- P. Balachandran as Madhavan's father
- Joy Mathew as Narayanan's arch rival
- Shine Tom Chacko as Vijayan, Narayanan's brother
- Chemban Vinod Jose as Perachan
- Sathaar as Krishna Pillai
- Sunil Sukhada
- Azees Nedumangadu
- Krishnan Pattambi
- Devi Ajith as Rukhmini
- Sija Rose as Lakshmi
- Sudheer Karamana
- Soja Jolly
- Renuka

== Production ==
Jiyen Krishnakumar, who directed College Days (2010), directs this film. Indrajith, Murali Gopy, and Archanna Guptaa play the lead roles. The film is written by B. Jeyamohan, who previously wrote Ozhimuri (2012).

== Reception ==
A critic from Sify wrote that "Kaanchi is like a cold glass of coffee that you find on your bedside as you get up on a cool morning. You can have it, but it won't give you any particular feeling. Decide on your own, if you want it or to go for some sparkling hot cup that will make you feel fresh!". Paresh Palincha of Rediff.com opined that "Kaanchi, despite its star duo of Indrajith and Murali Gopy, and a script by Jeyamohan, falls far short of expectations". Aswin J Kumar of The Times of India stated that "Kaanchi even throws up moments where a gifted story-teller like Jeyamohan seems doubtful of his own plot, something that hinders the plot".

== Box office ==
The film was a box office failure.
