= Why This Kolaveri =

Indian reality show

- Cover photo
- Genre: Game show
- Presented by: RJ Balaji
- Country of origin: India
- Original language: Tamil
- No. of seasons: 1
- No. of episodes: 44

Production
- Camera setup: Multi-camera
- Running time: approx. 40-45 minutes per episode

Original release
- Network: Zee Tamil
- Release: 14 December 2013 – 18 May 2014

Why This Kolaveri (stylised as Y this Kolaveri) was an Indian Tamil language reality television show that ran on Zee Tamil. It was a singing show featuring the contestants attempting to sing while various attempts were made to disrupt their performance. RJ Balaji hosted the show. The first episode premiered on 14 December 2013, and the 44th and last episode on 18 May 2014.

== Game format ==
Why This Kolaveri is based on the American game show Killer Karaoke and the British game show Sing If You Can, as it deals with participants having to sing while avoiding challenging situations. Unlike its American counterpart, the obstacles in this show were far less severe and were restricted to conditions like "standing on a two-tonne block of ice" and "walking blindfolded through a cactus maze".
