= Veetla Vishesham =

2022 film directed by RJ Balaji and NJ Saravanan

- Theatrical release poster
- Directed by: RJ Balaji; N. J. Saravanan
- Screenplay by: RJ Balaji
- Story by: Akshat Ghildial; Shantanu Srivastava
- Based on: Badhaai Ho by Akshat Ghildial
- Produced by: Boney Kapoor; Raahul
- Starring: RJ Balaji; Sathyaraj; Urvashi; Shivani Narayanan; Aparna Balamurali; K.P.A.C. Lalitha
- Cinematography: Karthik Muthukumar
- Edited by: Selva R. K.
- Music by: Girishh Gopalakrishnan
- Production companies: Zee Studios; Bayview Projects LLP; Romeo Pictures
- Distributed by: Zee Studios; Romeo Pictures
- Release date: 17 June 2022
- Country: India
- Language: Tamil

Veetla Vishesham (transl. A function at home) is a 2022 Indian Tamil-language comedy drama film directed by RJ Balaji and NJ Saravanan. It is a remake of the 2018 Hindi film Badhaai Ho. The film, starring Balaji, Sathyaraj and Urvasi, was produced by Boney Kapoor under the banner of Zee Studios.

Filming took place between March and August 2021. The film was released in theatres on 17 June 2022. It received positive reviews from critics and audiences and became a commercial success.

== Plot ==
Ilango, a 26 years old man who is working as a biology teacher in a senior secondary school, is also in stable relationship with Sowmya, his schoolmate and the only daughter of the school owner. Her mother likes him and approves of their relationship. His father, Unnikrishnan ‘Unni’, is a middle-aged man working as a TTE in Southern railways. His mother, Krishnaveni, is a typical housewife. His younger brother, Anirudh ‘Ani’, is a higher secondary student of same school. His family resides in the railway quarters, adjacent to Coimbatore Junction train station. Ilango’s grandmother always quarrels with Krishnaveni and dominates over her son, Unni. One day, she taunts Krishnaveni, who gets hurt by her comments. Unni consoles his wife and they get intimate.

17 weeks later, Krishnaveni realises she is pregnant after visiting the doctor. She decides not to abort the child. So Unni announces Krishnaveni’s third pregnancy to the family. The two sons are embarrassed and start to avoid their parents, friends, and society out of fear of being ridiculed. Unni also tells his mother about Krishnaveni's pregnancy, and his mother responds that they must deal with whatever God's desires are. The next day, Unni's mother makes a big scene and asks Krishnaveni to do some tedious work because she was not wearing her hearing aids the night before when Unni broke the news to her. While Ilango confesses this to Sowmya, she accepts this in a sportive way and consoles Ilango to accept his parents decision.

The news of the pregnancy goes viral, and they are made fun of by family, friends, relatives, and society. Unni and Krishnaveni ask Ilango and Anirudh to accompany them to Kerala for their cousin’s wedding. Both of them refuse by making excuses feared of ridicules. This makes Unni angry at them, and he leaves them with Krishnaveni and his mother. Meanwhile, Sowmya offers a room date to cheer Ilango up. But he is unable to get intimate with her as it reminds him of his mum’s pregnancy. Sowmya’s mother learns about Krishnaveni’s pregnancy from Sowmya. She is shocked and speaks badly about Ilango’s family. Ilango eavesdrops on their conversation and talks harshly with Sowmya’s mum, and breaks up with Sowmya.

At home, Anirudh reveals to Ilango that some boys made fun of him at school, and when he responded to them, one of the boys hit him on the face. Ilango and Anirudh then realise their love for their mum and dad. While in Kerala, Unni’s elder sister-in-law and sister tease Krishnaveni for her late pregnancy. For the first time, Unni’s mother defends her daughter-in-law for her dutifulness and makes them realise their selfishness and harsh attitude towards her.

Ilango then reconciles with his parents after their return and begins to fulfil his duties as a son. Krishnaveni realises that Ilango has broken up with Sowmya, and she tells him to apologise to Sowmya’s mother. Ilango reluctantly agrees, for his mother’s sake, and visits mum and tells her that he misses Sowmya and that the reason he accepted his mum’s pregnancy was because of Sowmya.

After the baby shower, Krishnaveni experiences labour pain and is immediately taken to the hospital, where Chief Minister LKG is also admitted due to heart pain. Sowmya’s mother tells her daughter about Ilango’s visit and apology, as well as saying that she has forgiven Ilango. Sowmya visits Ilango at the hospital. After the comical/strenuous delivery, the doctor announces the birth of a baby girl.

The family is delighted at the announcement. Later, the family gathers around Krishnaveni in joy and takes a group selfie with the baby girl.

== Cast ==
- RJ Balaji as Ilango Unnikrishnan
- Sathyaraj as Unnikrishnan 'Unni'
- Urvashi as Krishnaveni 'Achu' Unnikrishnan
- Aparna Balamurali as Sowmya
- K. P. A. C. Lalitha as Ilango's grandmother and Unni's mother
- Visvesh as Anirudh 'Ani' Unnikrishnan, Unni's and Krishnaveni's younger son
- Shivani Narayanan as Shalini Spandana 'Shalu', Ilango's cousin (extended cameo in "Kalyana Paatu" song)
- Seema as Unni's sister-in-law, Shalu's mother
- Pavitra Lokesh as Sowmya's mother
- Ravikumar as Vasu, Unni’s brother
- Pradeep Kottayam as Bijulal
- Rama as Anu, Unni's sister
- Mayilsamy as Unni's neighbour
- Pugazh as Amal Tailor, Ilango's friend
- George Maryan as Dr. George
- Deepa Shankar as Deepa, Unni's neighbour
- Kamala Kamesh as Dr. Jenny, the gynaecologist
- Kavithalayaa Krishnan as Varadharajan
- Nakkalites Dhanam as Dhanam, Unni's Neighbour
- Sangeetha Venkatesh as Unni’s neighbour
- Jagan Krishnan as Ilango's friend
- Mullai as Narayana
- Nishesh as Student
- Yogi Babu as NEET coaching centre owner
- Geetha Kailasam as Nurse
- Oru Viral Krishna Rao as Saurimuthu (in photograph)

== Production ==
The project, a remake of the Hindi film Badhaai Ho, was first reported in March 2021 under the title Veetla Visheshanga. Principal photography began in August 2021 at Coimbatore, and wrapped the following month after 40 working days. The actual title Veetla Vishesham was announced on 18 March 2022.

== Soundtrack ==
The soundtrack was composed by Girishh Gopalakrishnan with lyrics written by Pa. Vijay.

Track listing
No.	Title	Singer(s)	Length
1.	"Daddy Song"	RJ Balaji, Girishh Gopalakrishnan	3:31
2.	"Paapa Paattu (Vaa Vennilave)"	Sid Sriram	4:28
3.	"Kalyaana Paattu"	Sinduri Vishal, Vijay Yesudas	2:58
4.	"Family Paattu (Nooru Kovil Thevaiyillai)"	Jairam Balasubramaniam, Bombay Jayashri	4:59
Total length:			15:56

== Marketing and release ==
The cast members RJ Balaji and Aparna Balamurali appeared as a guests in the Zee Tamil series Pudhu Pudhu Arthangal for promoting Veetla Vishesham. The film was released in theatres on 17 June 2022. It began streaming on ZEE5 from 15 July 2022.

== Reception ==
=== Critical response ===
On the review aggregator website Rotten Tomatoes, 83% of 6 critics' reviews are positive, with an average rating of 6.5/10.

Bhuvanesh Chandar of The Hindu said, "Beyond comparisons with the original, Veetla Vishesham manages to stand on its own as a well-written drama that takes its theme seriously and as an entertainer that leaves the audience in splits during regular intervals". M. Suganth of The Times of India who gave 3.5 stars out of 5 stars after reviewing the film stated that "Remakes are tricky, especially when the original happens to be a National Award-winning film with a subject that can be touchy for many in the audience. But with Veetla Vishesham, RJ Balaji and NJ Saravanan have managed to capture the spirit of Badhaai Ho and come up with an entertaining film that makes us laugh out loud and get emotional in equal measure". Haricharan Pudipeddi of Hindustan Times said, "The Tamil remake of Badhaai Ho is a well-made entertaining film that manages to not just be good on its own but even stands up to the National Award-winning original".

Sudhir Srinivasan of Cinema Express who gave 3 stars out of 5 stars after reviewing the film stated that "When a film shows heart, you can excuse a loss of finesse, I think". Soundarya Athimuthu of The Quint who gave 3.5 stars out of 5 stars after reviewing the film stated that "Veetla Vishesham works both as an improvised remake if you already saw the Hindi original, and as a stand-alone film when watched with a pair of fresh eyes". Maalai Malar gave 3.75 rating out of 5 and noted that Balaji, who is playing the lead role in the film, has given a comedy and sarcasm performance in his own style. Especially in the film, he has attracted more attention in the sentimental scenes. However, Nakkheeran stated that if people who have not seen Hindi films watch this film, it will be an enjoyable film with a good concept. Dinamalar gave 3.25 rating out of 5.

=== Box office ===
Overall, the film has collected approximately ₹13 crore (equivalent to ₹14 crore or US$1.4 million in 2023) at the box office.
