= Kadamaiyai Sei =

2022 film directed by Venkatt Ragavan

- Theatrical release poster
- Directed by: Venkat Raghavan
- Written by: Venkat Raghavan
- Produced by: T.R. Ramesh; S. Zahir Hussain
- Starring: S. J. Suryah; Yashika Aannand
- Cinematography: Vinoth Rathnasamy
- Edited by: Srikanth N.B.
- Music by: Ganeshan
- Production companies: Ganesh Entertainment; Nahar Films
- Distributed by: Simbhu Cine Arts
- Release date: 12 August 2022
- Country: India
- Language: Tamil

Kadamaiyai Sei (transl. Do the duty) is a 2022 Indian Tamil-language film written and directed by Venkat Raghavan. The film stars S. J. Suryah and Yashika Aannand, while Rajendran, Vincent Asokan, and Charles Vinoth play supporting roles. It was released theatrically on 12 August 2022.

== Plot ==
Dharmarajan is a renowned builder. He and his brother Raj are not on good terms. Raj plans to hinder Dharmarajan's work by causing some mistakes in the construction, and the building is in a state of danger. Meanwhile, Ashok Mauryan, who has studied engineering, works as a security guard in the same apartment. Ashok finds out about the issues and warns Dharmarajan but gets caught in an accident and goes into a coma. How things get resolved is the rest of the movie.

== Cast ==
- S. J. Suryah as Ashok Mauryan
- Yashika Aannand as Aishwarya, Ashok’s wife
- Rajendran as Thief
- Vincent Asokan as Dharmarajan
- Charles Vinoth as Raj
- Lollu Sabha Seshu as Aishwarya's father
- Mohan Vaidya as one of the members in the building
- TSR Srinivasan as one of the members in the building
- Venkat Ragavan as Ragavan, engineer
- Rajasimman
- Hello Kandasamy

== Production ==
Filming began in February 2021, and wrapped in July the same year.

== Music ==
The music of the film is composed by Arun Raj.

Track listing
No.	Title	Lyrics	Singer(s)	Length
1.	"Kadamaiyai Sei"	Arun Bharathi	Gana Bala	4:28
2.	"Best Friendu"	Arun Bharathi	Arun, Lavita Lobo	3:42
3.	"Odu Thedu"	Arun Bharathi	Ganeshan	1:19
Total length:				9:29

== Marketing and release ==
On 6 May 2022, the trailer of the film was released and received positive responses. The film released theatrically on 12 August 2022 along with Viruman. It was initially believed that the film would release on 13 May. But then there were some other reports suggesting that the film would release on 24 June. However the release date was postponed.

== Critical reception ==
Logesh Balachandran of The Times of India gave the film's rating 2 out of 5 stars and wrote "The setup and playoffs are very poorly planned and doesn't rescue the film in anyway. We realise that the entire film is going to collapse just like the building with the only exception that we have no Ashok to save it." Dinamalar rated the film 2 out of 5. Chandini R of Cinema Express gave the film 2.5 out of 5 stars, stating that "If only, some better creative choices by the makers were in order, we would not just laud Kadamayai Sei but also enjoy it."
