= Patre Loves Padma =

2008 Indian film

- Directed by: Chandrashekhar Srivasthav
- Written by: Chandrashekhar Srivasthav
- Produced by: R. Pramila
- Starring: Ajith; Kruthika; Deepika; Vijayalakshmi; Pavitra; Supritha
- Cinematography: Cinetech Soori
- Edited by: S Soundar Rajan
- Music by: Arjun Janya
- Release date: 28 September 2008
- Country: India
- Language: Kannada

Patre Loves Padma is a 2008 Indian Kannada-language romantic drama film directed by Chandrashekhar Srivasthav and starring newcomers Ajith, Kruthika, Deepika, Vijayalakshmi, Pavitra and Supritha. The film was a box office failure, and is known for some of its songs by Arjun Janya. After this film, Ajith was known as Patre Ajith.

== Cast ==
- Ajith as Patre
- Kruttika Ravindra as Padma
- Deepika as Padma
- Vijayalakshmi as Padma
- Pavitra as Padma
- Supritha as Padma
- Loknath
- Ramesh Bhat
- Girija Lokesh

== Production ==
The five actresses named Padma are Kruthika, Deepika (Zee Kannada anchor), Vijayalakshmi (acted in Uda (2009)), Pavitra and Supritha. They span the age range of ten to twenty.

The film was produced by Ajith's mother, R. Pramila, who was the president of the Bangalore BJP Mahila Morcha. Twenty-three films were given a subsidy based on content. This film was given a subsidy of ₹1,000,000 (US$12,000) rupees despite not being in the list.

== Music ==
Patre Loves Padma

Soundtrack album by Arjun Janya
- Released: 2008
- Recorded: 2008
- Genre: Feature film soundtrack
- Length: 27:16
- Language: Kannada
- Label: Jhankar Music

Official audio
- Patre Loves Padma - Full Jukebox on YouTube

All lyrics are written by Chandrashekhar Srivasthav; all music is composed by Arjun Janya.

Track listing
No.	Title	Singer(s)	Length
1.	"Hingyaake"	Srinivas, K. S. Chithra, Anuradha Sriram	5:30
2.	"Elli Anta"	Gururaj Hoskote, Chaitra H. G.	5:27
3.	"Hey Hudugi"	Rajesh Krishnan, Nanditha	5:02
4.	"Kai Mugive"	Srinivas	3:11
5.	"Novina Butti"	Shankar Mahadevan	2:58
6.	"Paadu Nodiro"	C. Ashwath, B. Jayashree, Shankar Shanubog	5:08
Total length:			27:16

== Reception ==
A critic from Bangalore Mirror wrote that "Expect a test of patience when you watch the film". A critic from Rediff.com wrote that "Simply put, the film is a big disappointment". Film critic R. G. Vijayasarathy of IANS wrote that "The film belies all expectations and is a third degree torture for the audience".
