= Venkat Raghavan =

Indian screenwriter and director

Venkatt Ragavan
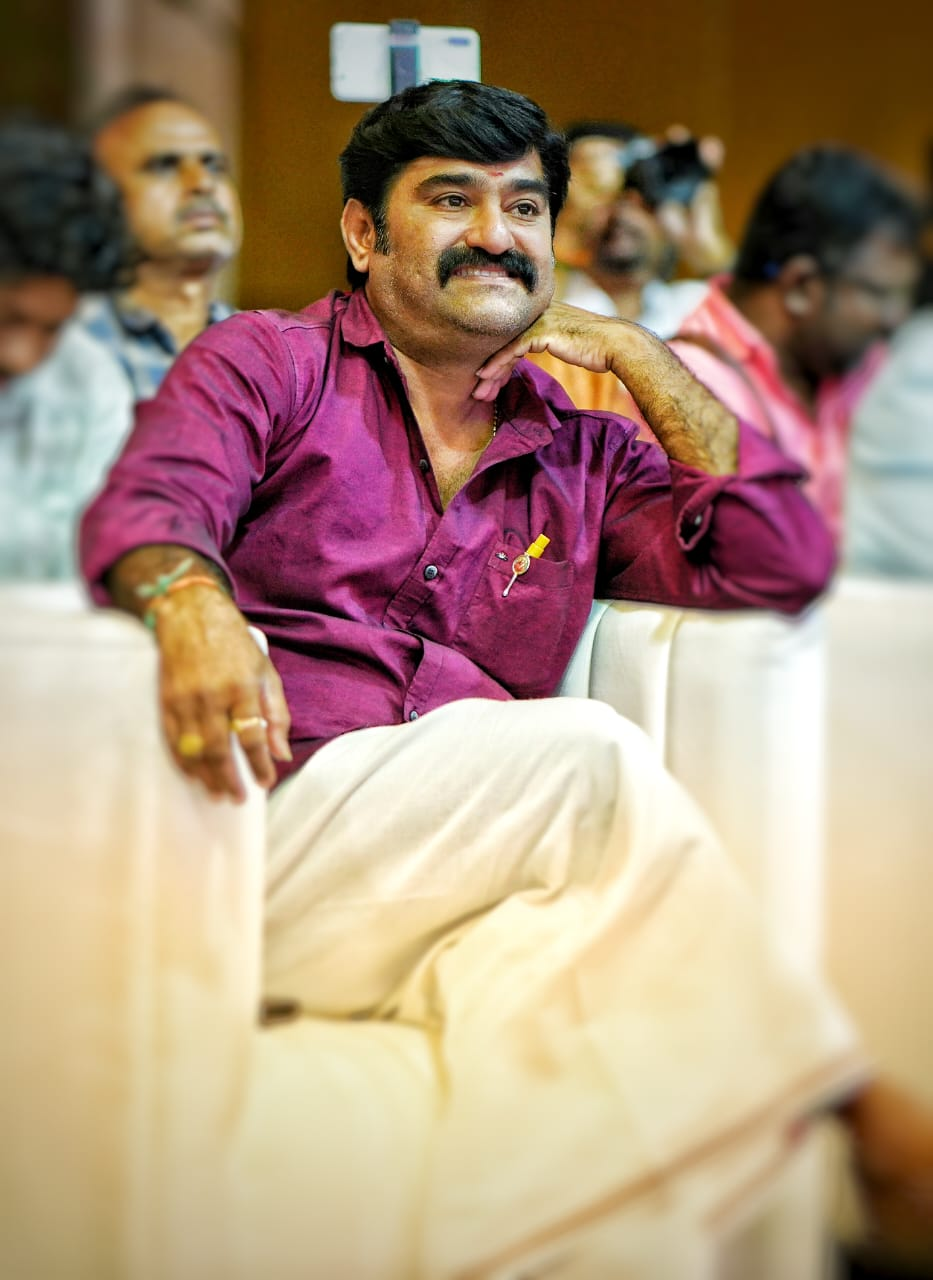
- Occupations: Screenwriter, film director
- Years active: 2014–present

Venkatt Ragavan a.k.a Venkat Raghavan (also credited as Venkatt Ragavan) is an Indian screenwriter and director in Tamil cinema. He is known for his collaborations with Sundar C.

== Career ==
He made his directorial debut with Muthina Kathirika (2016), a political comedy starring Sundar C, for which he also wrote the screenplay. In an interview, Ragavan said that while the film is a satire on politics, his aim was to keep it a “clean comedy” rather than a direct political attack.

In 2022, he directed Kadamaiyai Sei, starring S. J. Suryah and Yashika Aannand.

== Filmography ==
Year	Film	Credited as		Notes
Year	Film	Director	Writer	Notes
2014	Aranmanai	No	Dialogues	
2016	Aranmanai 2	No	Yes	
2016	Muthina Kathirika	Yes	Screenplay	
2018	Kalakalappu 2	No	Screenplay	
2022	Kadamaiyai Sei	Yes	Yes	Also actor
2024	Aranmanai 4	No	Yes	
2025	Gangers	No	Yes	
2025	Madha Gaja Raja	No	Screenplay	
2026	Mookuthi Amman 2	No	Yes	

=== Television ===
Year	Serial	Language	Notes
2017 – 2021	Nandini	Tamil; Kannada	Season 1
