= Achchu Mechchu =

- Film poster
- Directed by: Himayath Khan
- Written by: M. V. Lokesh
- Produced by: M. V. Lokesh
- Starring: Tarun Chandra; Archana Gupta
- Cinematography: Nagesh V. Acharya
- Edited by: K. Eshwar; Sanjeeva Reddy
- Music by: A. M. Neel
- Production company: Vinayaka Movie Makers
- Release date: 18 November 2011
- Running time: 130 minutes
- Country: India
- Language: Kannada

Achchu Mechchu is a 2011 Indian Kannada-language romantic drama film directed by Himayath Khan and starring Tarun Chandra and Archana Gupta.

== Cast ==
- Tarun Chandra as Vijay
- Archana Gupta as Shraddha
- Achyuth Kumar as Purushottam
- Veena Sundar as Savitha and Swapna
- Sadhu Kokila
- Naveen D. Padil
- M. S. Umesh as the priest
- Shobaraj as Jagadish
- Bank Janardhan
- Mohan Juneja
- Srinivas Gowda

== Soundtrack ==
Achchu Mechchu

Soundtrack album by A. M. Neel
- Released: 2011
- Recorded: 2011
- Genre: Feature film soundtrack
- Length: 25:45
- Language: Kannada
- Label: Anand Audio

Official audio
- Achchu Mechchu - Full Album on YouTube

All music is composed by A. M. Neel.

Track listing
No.	Title	Singer(s)	Length
1.	"Ninna Mele"	Tippu	4:30
2.	"Yavudo Janmada"	Supriya Ramakrishnaiah	2:56
3.	"Nille Nille"	Ritgish, Akash	4:26
4.	"Hey Olave"	Karthik, Anuradha Bhat	4:40
5.	"Sa Sa Sariga"	Santosh, Ritgish	4:35
6.	"Yeko Yeno"	A. M. Neel	4:38
Total length:			25:45

== Reception ==
A critic from The Hindu wrote that "Touted as tender lover story, Achu Mechu is a torture to sit through despite the presence Tarun Chandra and Archana Gupta in the cast. The film is badly let down by the storyline and screenplay though its theme is ageless: love unbound by age". A critic from IANS rated the film 1 1/2 out of 5 and wrote that "Over all Achchu Mechchu is a disappointing fare".
