= Archanna Guptaa =

Indian actress and model

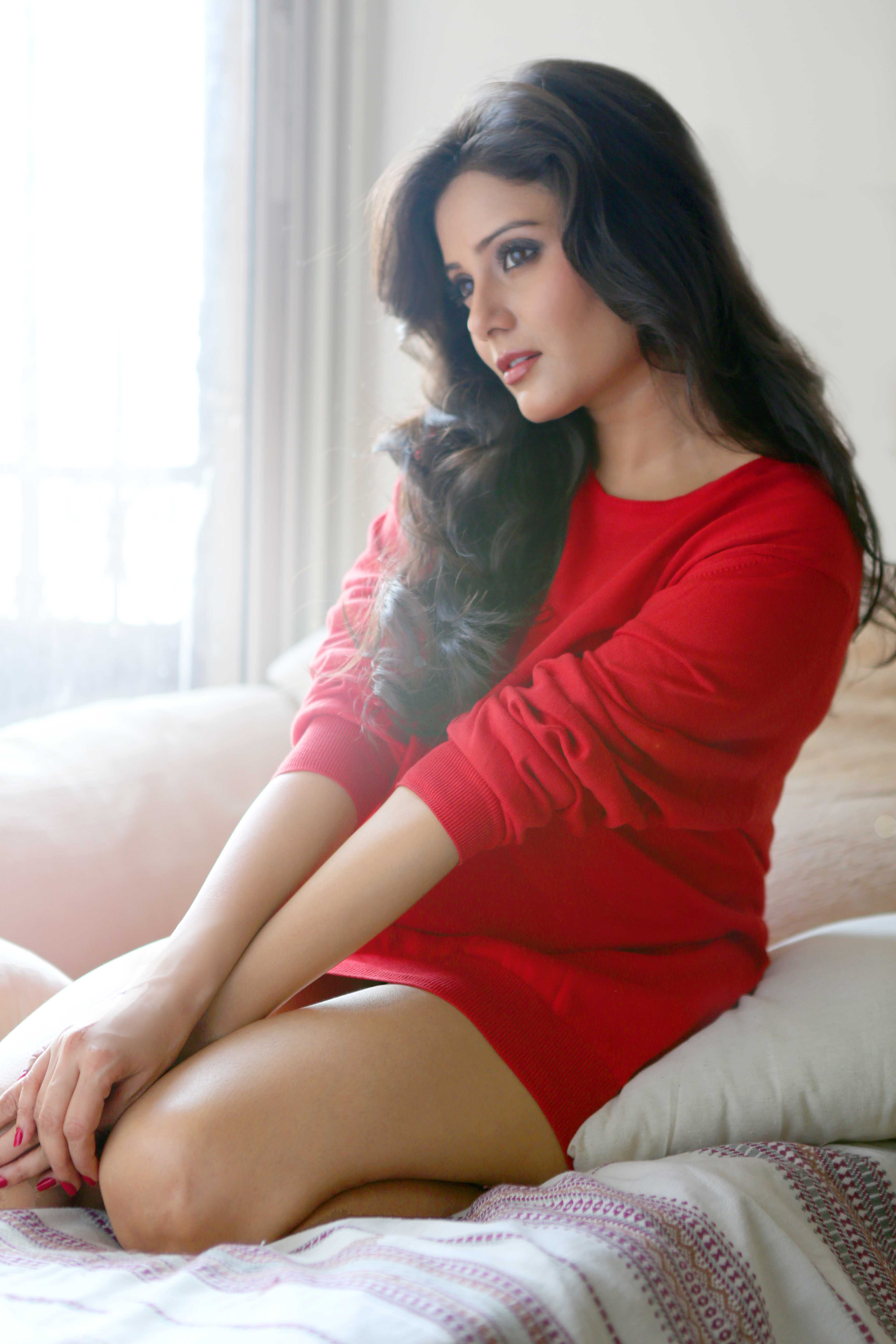
- Born: Agra, Uttar Pradesh, India
- Other name: Archanna Guptaa
- Occupations: Actress, model
- Years active: 2008–2021
- Website: archannaguptaa.com

Archana Gupta (also known as Archanna Guptaa) is an Indian actress and model based out of Mumbai. She has acted in Tamil, Kannada, Malayalam, Telugu and a Russian film. She recently acted in a web series called Poison for ZEE5 along with Arbaz Khan, Riya Sen, Freddy Daruwala, Tanuj Virwani & others. Archana Gupta also played a lead role in short film Banjar alongside Maniesh Paul. She has also been participating in stage shows.

== Personal life ==
Archanna was born in Agra and later moved to Mumbai to establish her career as a model and a film actress. She has one sister Vandana Gupta who is also an actress.

== Career ==
Archanna made her acting debut in the Telugu film Andamaina Manasulo.

She made her Kannada debut in the film Circus, opposite Ganesh, which was released in mid-January 2009. She followed it up with three more films in Kannada: Lift Kodla, Karthik and Achchu Mechchu. She acted in a Russian film Raja Vaska.

In 2013, she is currently doing three projects in Malayalam — Rasputin, Hangover and Kaanchi.

== Filmography ==
Year	Film	Role	Language	Notes
2008	Andamaina Manasulo	Bindu	Telugu	Telugu Debut
2008	Saanncha	Chakori	Hindi	Hindi Debut; Art film
2009	Circus	Priya	Kannada	Kannada Debut
2010	Lift Kodla		Kannada	
2011	Karthik	Nisha	Kannada	
2011	Queens! Destiny of Dance	Nandini	Hindi	
2011	Achchu Mechchu	Shraddha	Kannada	
2012	Maasi	Lakshmi	Tamil	Tamil Debut
2013	Kaanchi	Gauri	Malayalam	Malayalam Debut
2013	Desires of the Heart	Radha	English	English Debut
2014	Hangover	Reshmi	Malayalam	
2014	Aryan	Hamsa	Kannada	
2015	Rasputin	Ambili	Malayalam	
2015	Raja Vaska		Russian	Russian Debut
2018	Ek Betuke Aadmi ki Afrah Raatien	Gomti	Hindi	
2018	Me too		Hindi	Short Film
2019	Banjar		Punjabi	Short Film
2019	Poison	Megha	Hindi	Web Series
2021	Iruvar Ullam	Sambavi	Tamil	Delayed release; Filmed in 2012–13
2021	Aafat-E-Ishq	Suhani	Hindi	Zee5 film

== See also ==
- List of Indian film actresses
