= Run Baby Run (2023 film) =

2023 film directed by Jiyen Krishnakumar

- First look poster
- Directed by: Jiyen Krishnakumar
- Written by: Jiyen Krishnakumar
- Produced by: S. Lakshman Kumar
- Starring: RJ Balaji; Aishwarya Rajesh; Isha Talwar
- Cinematography: S. Yuva
- Edited by: Madan Ganesh
- Music by: Sam C. S.
- Production company: Prince Pictures
- Release date: 3 February 2023
- Running time: 132 minutes
- Country: India
- Language: Tamil

Run Baby Run is a 2023 Indian Tamil-language action thriller film written and directed by Jiyen Krishnakumar. The film stars RJ Balaji, Aishwarya Rajesh and Isha Talwar.

== Plot ==
The film starts with the death of a medical student named Sophie after she falls from a building.

The story flashes forward by seven days. Sathya, a banker who recently got engaged, visits a jewellery store, looking to surprise his fiancée Priyanka with earrings. After buying the jewellery, he picks up Priyanka and looks forward to impressing her with the costly gift when he suddenly notices another young woman hiding in the backseat of his car.

Sathya gets caught in a catch-22 situation. He cannot continue to drive without knowing who the woman hiding in his car is. At the same time, he cannot stop the vehicle and question the woman, lest his future wife gets the wrong impression. He waits for the opportune moment, which takes quite a while, and finally, when he does get the opportunity, he questions her. He discovers that the woman hiding in his car is Tara, a medical college student, and her life is in danger. She begs him to let her stay in his flat until her guardian, Father Vincent, comes and picks her up in an hour or two. Sathya initially refuses and is adamant about throwing her out, but eventually, he gives in, moved by her plight. He lets her into a guest room and tells her she does not have to let him know when she leaves with Vincent. However, this turns out to be a horrible mistake.

The following morning, Sathya's future father-in-law visits him, and he only then notices that Tara's dupatta and handbag are still where she left them in his living room. He looks into the room where he left her and sees Tara unconscious, presumably dead, on the floor. Just then, the police arrive at his flat to investigate a disturbance in the building, but they find nothing there.

Then, Sathya visits his friend, Jai Ganesh, a police officer, in a quiet field. Jai advises disposing of the body so Sathya will not get into trouble. Sathya prepares to dispose of the body, but his car breaks down en route. After a few incidents, he leaves the body in a van, where the driver finds it and decides to burn it. The next day, police arrived at the scene. The driver hangs himself, afraid of being caught. Sathya receives a call from a private number, saying that if he becomes a detective looking into Tara's murder, he will be the next to hang.

Officers close the case by saying the victim is unidentified and the accused killed himself. DSP Kabir Ahamed decided to inquire, and the driver's mother told him about five people who climbed into the vehicle. Kabir's further inquiry leads him to find Sathya, who visits the police station and subsequently leaves. However, a truck tries to kill him on the carriageway. The police issue a transfer order to Jai, and he informs Sathya. In addition, Priyanka's family cancelled his wedding after leaked photos showed Sathya lying down with a girl. Sathya contemplates suicide, but his mother convinces him not to do anything fatal. After multiple incidents, Sathya investigates Tara's murder by questioning various people, such as Vincent's assistant, Sophie's lover Kathir, and the hostel watchman. He even gets attacked by several people. However, he discovers the medical college dean, Dr. Francis Raja, is the devious mastermind behind Sophie and Tara's deaths. Sathya fights with Francis, who reveals what happened.

Francis raped Sophie and threw her out of the window. Tara saw photos of Sophie's autopsy in a file and said someone murdered her. Francis sends goons to get her. She left the file in Sathya's car. However, Francis killed Vincent after he had to go to visit Sathya. He went to Sathya's apartment, destroyed the server room, strangled Tara, and took a picture of Thara and Sathya lying together. Francis planned to kill orphaned postgraduate students and give the seats to wealthy students to gain money. Eventually, Sathya leaves Kathir and his gang to kill Francis, and Sathya hands the evidence of Francis's involvement to Kabir.

== Cast ==
- RJ Balaji as Sathya
- Aishwarya Rajesh as Tara
- Isha Talwar as Priyanka, Sathya's fiancee
- Smruthi Venkat as Sophie
- Radhika Sarathkumar as Sathya's mother
- Joe Malloori as Dr. Francis Raja, the medical college dean
- Hareesh Peradi as Father Vincent, Tara's guardian
- George Maryan as Van Passenger
- Vivek Prasanna as Constable Jai Ganesh, Sathya's friend
- Bagavathi Perumal as Church Father
- Raj Ayyappa as Kathir, Sophia’s love interest
- Tamizh as DSP Kabir Ahamed
- Kabali Vishwanth as Van Driver
- KPY Bala as Drunk Passenger
- Nagineedu as Priyanka’s father
- Rethika Srinivas as van driver's mother
- TSR Srinivasan
- Munnar Ramesh
- Raja Rani Pandian
- Priyadarshini Rajkumar

== Production ==
On 15 December 2022, it was announced that RJ Balaji and Jiyen Krishnakumar would team up for a film. The film was titled as Run Baby Run and is the first action thriller film of RJ Balaji and the first look poster of the film also was released on the same day. The makers released the glimpse of the film on 11 January 2023 coinciding with the Pongal festival.

== Music ==
The music of the film is composed by Sam C. S.

Track listing
No.	Title	Lyrics	Singer(s)	Length
1.	"Run Baby Run-Theme Music"	Sam C. S., Lavita Lobo	Sam C. S., Lavita Lobo	1:30
2.	"Aval Oru Varam"	Viveka	Kapil Kapilan	3:22
Total length:				4:52

== Release ==
=== Theatrical ===
The film released theatrically on 3 February 2023. The trailer of the film was released on 19 January 2023. Run Baby Run was released in UK and Europe by Ahimsa Entertainment.

=== Home media ===
The film began streaming on Disney+ Hotstar from 10 March 2023.

== Reception ==
Logesh Ramachandran of The Times of India who gave 3 stars out of 5 stars after reviewing the film stated that, "Run Baby Run has all the ingredients that a crime thriller requires but is not powerful enough to linger in our minds". Praveen Sudevan of The Hindu wrote "In the end, we are left with these ‘if onlys’". Janani K of India Today who gave 2.5 stars out of 5 stars after reviewing the film stated that, "Run Baby Run exposes a doctored crime in the climax and one would be able to buy the twists as it comes out of nowhere". Haricharan Pudipeddi of Hindustan Times after reviewing the film stated that,"The supporting cast does a decent job in playing their respective parts fittingly". Navein Darshan of Cinema Express rated the film 3 out of 5 stars and wrote "The message Run Baby Run conveys isn't novel either as there have been a couple of films made in the recent past based on the same issue". Kirubhakar Purushothaman of The Indian Express gave the film 3 out of 5 stars and wrote "It is time heroes and filmmakers realise they need not always save the world. Sometimes saving a decent film from becoming a mediocre affair is good enough". Dhanushya of ABP Live rated the film 3.5 out of 5 stars and asked would it have been better if this movie was released directly in OTT instead of watching it in theatres? This is the opinion of the fans who have seen the film. Ranjani Krishnakumar of Film Companion wrote that Run Baby Run was not a bad film: "Far from it. It’s a passable film with handful of thrills to offer". A critic for Cinema Vikatan wrote "Run Baby Run settles for being a conventional thriller with many logic holes and no innovative scenes". A critic from Dinamalar rated the film 2.5 out of 5 stars. A critic for News18 wrote "Run Baby Run would have been commendable, had the narrative been carried out in a more vibrant way".
