= Hangover (2014 film) =

- Firstlook of Malayalam film Hangover
- Directed by: Sreejith Sukumaran
- Screenplay by: Sumesh V Robin
- Story by: Sreejith Sukumaran
- Produced by: AOPL
- Starring: Maqbool Salmaan; Shine Tom Chacko; Bhagath Manuel; Govind Krishna
- Cinematography: Anishlal
- Edited by: Sujith Sahadev
- Music by: Mejo Joseph
- Production company: AOPL Entertainment
- Release date: 8 February 2014
- Country: India
- Language: Malayalam

Hangover is a 2014 Malayalam film directed by debutant Sreejith Sukumaran featuring Maqbool Salmaan, Shine Tom Chacko and Bhagath Manuel together with martial arts expert Govind Krishna who debuts in the film, in the lead roles The film showcases four friends from different tiers of society and how despite their devil-may-care personas rise up to tackle an incident in their lives. Archana Gupta and Shritha Sivadas play the heroines.

== Cast ==
- Maqbool Salmaan as Aby Kurishingal
- Shine Tom Chacko as Noor/Noorudheen
- Bhagath Manuel as Appu
- Govind Krishna as Kiran
- Archana Gupta as Reshmi Susan Mathew
- Shritha Sivadas as Sanjana
- Vaishali Vasu as Priya
- Sreekanth Bhasi as Jacky/Janardhanan
- Dileesh Pothan as Krishnakumar
- Reena Basheer as Molly
- Jose as Rakhavji/Rakhavan
- Pradeep as Shebin
- Sanju Bhaskar as Sanju
- Sunder as Sunder
- Kottayam Basheer as Jermiyyas

== Music ==
The film's original soundtrack and film score was composed by Mejo Joseph. The soundtrack comprises seven songs. All songs were released by Muzik 247 in 2014.

All music is composed by Mejo Joseph.

No.	Title	Artist(s)	Length
1.	"Vellithinkal"	Najim Arshad, Sharon Joseph
2.	"Annu Nammal"	Aslam Keyi
3.	"Cheru Cheru"	Mejo Joseph, Vipin Xavier, Nivas
4.	"Eeran Thennal"	Sithara (singer), V. Devanand
5.	"Nenchil Aalum"	Yazin Nizar
6.	"Vattathil"	Sangeetha Prabhu, Franco Simon, Sam Shiva
7.	"Poovin Maarile"	Sangeetha Prabhu, Nivas
