= Kruttika Ravindra =

Indian actress

Kruttikaa
- Born: Kruttika R Sagara, Karnataka
- Occupation: (Kannada cinema) actress
- Years active: 2008–present
- Website: https://kruttikaravindra.com/

Kruttikaa, is a Kannada television and Kannada cinema actress who is best known for her acting in "Radha Kalyana" TV show which was telecast on Zee Kannada. She also appeared in the Kannada TV reality show Bigg Boss Kannada 3, and aired on Colors Kannada Channel from 25 October 2015. She entered in the house on the first day of the show and was in the Bigg Boss house for 63 day.

== Early life ==
Kruttika was born to Havyaka Brahmin Parents in Sagar Taluk in Karnataka. Her father is late Dr. Ravindra and Mother Smt. Meenakruti Meena, a school teacher. Kruttika completed her education at Sadhana Vidya Kendra, Anandapuram in Sagara.

== Career ==
She made her debut on silver screen with the Kannada film ‘Patre Loves Padma’. She came into prominence with the lead role in daily soap opera ‘Radha Kalyana’ which aired on Zee Kannada. She has acted in Kengulabi In this emotional role and is also acting in Yarige Yaruntu

== Filmography ==
Year	Film	Role	Notes
2008	Patre Loves Padma	Padma	
2009	Auto		
2010	Lift Kodla		
2018	Kengulabi	Shari	
2018	Yaarige Yaaruntu	Priya	
2021	Maricha	Prathima	
2021	Shardula	Deeksha	

== Television ==
Year	Serial	Role	Channel
2010	Mane Magalu	Inchara	Udaya TV
2011 - 2015	Radha Kalyana	Radha	Zee Kannada
2023–Present	Bhoomige Banda Bhagavanta	Girija	Zee Kannada
