= Lift Kodla =

- VCD cover
- Directed by: Ashok Kashyap
- Written by: Rama Narayan (dialogue)
- Screenplay by: Ashok Kashyap
- Based on: Mee Sreyobhilashi by V. Eshwar Reddy
- Produced by: Shankar Reddy
- Starring: Jaggesh; Komal
- Cinematography: Ashok Kashyap
- Edited by: Udayaravi Hegde
- Music by: V. Manohar
- Production company: Sri CMR Productions
- Release date: 16 July 2010
- Country: India
- Language: Kannada
- Budget: ₹3.5 crore (US$410,000)

Lift Kodla (transl. Shall I drop you off?) is a 2010 Indian Kannada-language comedy drama film directed by Ashok Kashyap and starring Jaggesh and Komal. It is a remake of the Telugu-language film Mee Sreyobhilashi (2007), which itself is based on the Japanese film Ikinai (1998). The film deals with the topic of suicides and was released a day after television actors Indudhar and Hema committed suicide. The film was a box office success and ran for more than four weeks in theatres.

== Plot ==
The film follows Krishna (Jaggesh) and how he prevents a group of ten bus passengers (including Ring Road Gowda played by Komal) travelling from Bangalore to Kodachadri Hills from committing suicide.

== Cast ==
- Jaggesh as Krishna
- Komal as Ring Road Gowda
- Shashi Kumar as a police officer
- Archanna Guptaa
- Srinivasa Murthy
- Sadhu Kokila as Bogananda Swamy
- Raju Talikote
- Shobaraj
- R. N. Sudarshan
- Bullet Prakash
- Sangamesh Upase
- Rekha Kumar
- Brahmavar
- Jeevan
- Kruthika
- Mimicry Dayanand
- Honnavalli Krishna
- Bank Janardhan
- Katta Subramanya Naidu as the chief minister (cameo appearance)

== Production ==
After the success of Manmatha (2007), brothers Jaggesh and Komal starred together in this film. Archanna Guptaa plays a rich girl who softens out in the end.

== Soundtrack ==
Lift Kodla

Soundtrack album by V. Manohar
- Released: 2010
- Recorded: 2010
- Genre: Feature film soundtrack
- Length: 21:33
- Language: Kannada

Official audio
- Lift Kodla Audio Jukebox on YouTube

The music was composed by V. Manohar. The song "Ondu Maathu" is plagiarised/translated from the song "Oru Vaarthai Solla" from the Tamil film Ayyaa (2005). The song "Chirunavvulatho Brathakali" from Mee Sreyobhilashi was reused as "Manasondu Iddare Marga" with S. P. Balasubrahmanyam singing both versions.

Track listing
No.	Title	Lyrics	Singer(s)	Length
1.	"Ondu Maathu"	Ram Narayan	Rajesh Krishnan, Anuradha Bhat	5:01
2.	"Happy Happy Birthday"	V. Manohar	Kunal Ganjawala	4:36
3.	"Suriviya Maleyalli"	V. Manohar	Rajesh Krishnan	4:31
4.	"Manasondu Iddare Marga"	Ram Narayan	S. P. Balasubrahmanyam	7:23
Total length:				21:33

== Reception ==
A critic from The New Indian Express wrote that "Director Ashok Kashyap has faithfully followed the original version. Had this film released a few years earlier, some of the people who had committed suicide might have changed their minds". V. S. Rajapur from IANS rated the film 2 1/2 out of 5 stars and wrote that "Lift Kodla is a well made film - it has a good story, content, technical values and neat performances". A critic from Filmibeat wrote that "The movie is a mirror to reality. Don't miss the movie". A critic from Indiaglitz rated the film 7 1/2 out of 10 and wrote that "This is a must watch film for those who are planning to end their life. Live your life full and for the deep neck problems suicide is not the answer". A critic from Chitraloka wrote that "Lift Kodla is a film that no self-respecting Kannada film goers would want to miss".
