= Muthina Kathirika =

2016 Indian film by Venkat Raghavan

- Theatrical release poster
- Directed by: Venkat Raghavan
- Screenplay by: Venkat Raghavan
- Story by: Joji Thomas
- Based on: Vellimoonga by Jibu Jacob
- Produced by: Sundar C Khushbu
- Starring: Sundar C Poonam Bajwa
- Narrated by: RJ Balaji
- Cinematography: Bhanu Murugan
- Edited by: N. B. Srikanth
- Music by: Siddharth Vipin
- Production company: Avni Cinemax
- Distributed by: Sri Thenandal Films
- Release date: 17 June 2016
- Running time: 129 minutes
- Country: India
- Language: Tamil

Muthina Kathirika (transl. Overripe brinjal) (Note: Colloquially, the term refers to a man who has crossed his prime and is still unmarried.) is a 2016 Indian Tamil-language political comedy film written and directed by Venkat Raghavan, in his directorial debut, and produced by Avni Cinemax. A remake of the Malayalam film Vellimoonga (2014), it stars Sundar C and Poonam Bajwa. The film was released on 17 June 2016.

== Plot ==
In 1996, an 18-year Muthupandi visits the local police station in Kovilur in Thenkasi for a small issue. He gets a good respect in station as his grandfather was an MLA from ADBD party, which is a national party. Muthupandi realises the worth of politics and foolishly joins the party, without realising that ADBD has no hold in Tamilnadu. He tries to woo his college senior Madhavi, but ends up in a scuffle with supr-senior Ravikumar, and drops all hopes of love.

20 years later, Muthupandi is still unmarried and is the State General Secretary of the meek party. His younger brother is married, has kids and works as Government employee and his younger sister is in college. Content from the family's income from ancestral properties, Muthupandi engages in tricks and tactics to keep his party's name alive with nil funding. His assistant Kumar also tags along with him in hopes of making it big.

Bullet Marudhupandi is the Vice-Chairman of Kovilur Municipality and has been vying for MLA seat for 10 years. Despite being an influential member of ruling MMSK party, he is upset that the seat is always given to coalition parties. He has placed a rubber stamp lady as Chairman as per women reservation, and runs the administration. Vanjinathan, the younger brother of Marudhu is a leading member of opposition MMKK party, and has twice lost from the same constituency. Despite being members of opposite groups they maintain a secret rapport and enjoy monopoly in civil contracts.

Muthupandi meets a young lady Maya and falls in love with her. He goes to meet her parents, and finds out that she is the daughter of his crush madhavi and Ravikumar. Ravikumar, now a Police [Inspector], vows not to marry off Maya to muthupandi. At the same time General elections are announced for the State. As a revenge for all the tricks pulled on by Muthupandi, Marudhupandi and Vanjinathan arrange for Sanjay, a rich london return NRI to marry Maya on the day of results of the election, as Ravikumar is their distant cousin.

Muthupandi meets the State President Gopi in Chennai, and they meet with Saamy, the PA of their National President Sharma. Saamy tells the duo that, Sharma wants to improve the party in the South after the General elections. He offers Muthupandi the option to become an MP of Rajya sabha from Assam and then a central deputy-minister, as Muthupandi knows Hindi. Muthupandi offers to get Gopi's home-seat Tambaram from ruling MMKK party and let him become MLA. Gopi, with desire to become an MP, double-crosses Muthupandi, and meets with the Chief Minister, who is also MMKK President, and gets Kovilur allocated to their party. Muthupandi is shocked at the change, and devises a plan.

Muthupandi challenges to Gopi that he will lose the election, and then go on to become an MP. Gopi convinces a distraught Marudhupandi to work for Muthupandi, and tells him about the MP option and pays him heavily. Despite all of Muthupandi's attempts to lose, the campaign goes on well. Vanjinathan contests for the opponent MMKK party and he also campaigns strongly.

On day of election, Muthupandi wins by 2000 votes and becomes an MLA. Muthupandi reveals to Kumar that the "MP and deputy-minister" plan was a drama arranged by him, to win. At the end of the day, MMKK and MMSK win 117 and 116 seats respectively in 234-member assembly, making muthupandi the decider as he contested from his party's symbol. Meanwhile, Sanjay absconds from the wedding, and Ravikumar is cajoled by his relatives to marry off maya to MLA muthupandi. Ravi agrees without will, and Muthupandi finally marries Maya. MMKK offers Muthupandi Khadi Minister post in the new Cabinet, in exchange for his support to form government. Muthupandi rejects the offer to become Khadi Minister, and offers MMKK his support. He tells a surprised Maruthupandi that he has eyes on Revenue Dept, the wealthiest one.

3 days later Muthupandi, Maya and Kumar leave for Chennai to attend govt functions. Muthupandi has arranged for his brother and sister-in-law to be transferred back to Kovilur, to be with their mother. Sanjay meets Muthupandi and maya when they are going to Madurai airport. He reveals that he was also a hoax planted by muthupandi to marry maya. Muthupandi opens up to Maya and Maya forgives Muthupandi, and they reconcile. Kumar gets a call from the CM office, informing them that Muthupandi has been the given post as Revenue Department Minister.

== Cast ==
- Sundar C as Muthupandi, Minister for Revenue, Government of Tamil Nadu
- Poonam Bajwa as Maya, Spouse of the Minister
- Kiran Rathod as Madhavi, Muthupandi's former love interest and Maya's Mother
- Sathish as Saravanan
- VTV Ganesh as 'Bullet' Marudhu
- Singampuli as 'Theenja Vaai' Vanjinathan
- Ravi Mariya as Ravikumar
- Yogi Babu as "Paavi" Babu
- Sumithra as Muthupandi's mother
- Sriman as Gopi
- Singapore Deepan as Marudhu's Assistant
- George Vishnu as Muthupandi's brother
- Tamilselvi as Muthupandi's sister-in-law
- Krithika Laddu as Saravanan's cousin
- Archana Harish as Valli, Saravanan's sister
- Chitra Lakshmanan as Saamy
- Sivan Srinivasan as Rathnavel
- "Hello" Kandasaamy as Astrologer
- Rahul Thatha as a beggar
- Vaibhav as Sanjay (Guest Appearance)

== Production ==
In February 2015, Sundar C announced that he had purchased the remake rights of two Malayalam films, Pandippada (2005) and Vellimoonga (2014) and stated he would act in the latter venture. The team began filming in mid-February 2016. By May 2016, filming was complete.

== Soundtrack ==
Muthina Kathirika

Soundtrack album by Siddharth Vipin
- Released: 30 May 2016
- Recorded: 2016
- Genre: Soundtrack
- Length: 16:15
- Label: Divo
- Producer: Siddharth Vipin

Siddharth Vipin chronology
Hello Naan Pei Pesuren (2016)	Muthina Kathirika (2016)	Brahma.com (2017)

Music is composed by Siddharth Vipin and released by Divo.

Track-List
No.	Title	Lyrics	Artist(s)	Length
1.	"Aacha Pocha"	Mohan Rajan	Anthony Daasan	3:34
2.	"Summa Sollakoodathu"	Mohan Rajan	Jagadeesh Kumar	3:32
3.	"Enakkenna Aacho"	Mohan Rajan	Aandhi Joshi	4:20
4.	"Aahaa Ohoo Electionee"	Mohan Rajan	Guru	4:49
Total length:				16:15

== Critical reception ==
The Times of India wrote, "Muthina Kathirika is unapologetic about being a lowest common denominator movie. It is loud, it is crass, and it is somewhat fun, especially in the first half. Director Venkatt keeps things fairly low-key and the small-town setting helps. There is hardly anything at stake, but Venkat keeps the scenes moving, and though the comedy is hardly memorable or new, we are entertained." Rediff.com wrote, "The Malayalam version of the film may have worked but debutant director Venkat’s Muthina Kathirikai is an ordinary attempt with lackluster performances, weak screenplay and an overly enthusiastic cast." Baradwaj Rangan wrote for The Hindu, "Frankly, there isn’t much to talk about. A few scattered laughs, maybe." Chennai Vision wrote, "N Srikanth’s editing, Bhanu Murugan’s cinematography and Siddharth Vipin’s music— all are strictly average. But still, you can watch Muthina Kathirika once for the ‘time pass’ it provides". Deccan Chronicle wrote, "The screenplay could have been paced a lot better and some of the visuals look really dated and not of this time and age. Go for it for the comedy and Sundar C’s showcase".
