= Rasputin (2015 film) =

- Directed by: Jinu G. Daniel
- Written by: Jinu G. Daniel
- Produced by: E. P. Varghese
- Starring: Vinay Forrt; Sreenath Bhasi; Aju Varghese; Joy Mathew; Vandana Menon; Archana Gupta
- Cinematography: Hari Nair
- Edited by: Sriram raja
- Music by: Roby Abraham
- Production company: Blue Moon Pictures
- Release date: 7 August 2015
- Country: India
- Language: Malayalam

Rasputin is a 2015 Indian Malayalam-language coming-of-age romantic comedy film directed by Jinu G. Daniel. The film stars Vinay Forrt as the central character, with Sreenath Bhasi, Aju Varghese, Joy Mathew, Vandana Menon and Archana Gupta. It is produced by E. P. Varghese under the Blue Moon Pictures banner, with the cinematography by Hari Nair.

== Cast ==
- Vinay Forrt as Susheelan / Susheel
- Sreenath Bhasi as Radhenathan/Radhs
- Aju Varghese as Gopalan / Gops
- Joy Mathew as Vayalil Satheesan
- Nandu
- Sunil Sukhada
- Vandana Menon as Dr. Smitha
- Archana Gupta as Ambili
- Srinda Ashab
- Shritha Sivadas
- Prasanth Prado
- Suraj C Nair

== Soundtrack ==
The music was composed by Roby Abraham and the background score by Vimal T.K. The lyrics for the songs were written by Arun K. Narayanan, Joe Paul and Rafeeq Ahmed.

== Reception ==
A critic from The Times of India wrote: "The director fails to produce anything funny while stitching together a tale".
