= College Days (2010 film) =

2010 Malayalam film

- DVD Cover
- Directed by: Jiyen Krishnakumar
- Written by: Jiyen Krishnakumar
- Produced by: Seena Sadath
- Starring: Indrajith Sukumaran; Biju Menon
- Cinematography: Sujith Vaassudev
- Edited by: Mahesh Narayanan
- Music by: Songs: Ronnie Raphael; Score: Stephen Devassy
- Production company: Pavithram Creations
- Release date: 19 November 2010
- Running time: 164 minutes
- Country: India
- Language: Malayalam

College Days is a 2010 Indian Malayalam-language crime thriller film written and directed by Jiyen Krishnakumar. The film stars Indrajith Sukumaran and Biju Menon in pivotal roles. The film received mixed reviews from the critics and the audience. The script and the performances of Indrajith, Biju Menon and Jagathy Sreekumar were praised where as the cast, screenplay and direction were criticised.

== Plot ==
The movie opens with the sequences of first year medical student Athira pushed to death by a notorious gang of five friends Joe Joseph, Anand, Anu Ramachandran, Rakhi and Satheesh, the State Minister Ramakrishnan's son. But with the influential system and false testimony of the college principal, the gang is let free and is allowed to continue with their studies.

After the titles, the movie moves on to another fresh year with the same gang continuing with their menacing activities. Rohit Menon, a young man arrives from Bangalore, to do House Surgency in the same college, who enters into a tussle with the group from day one. The friends now plot many plans to corner him and get him evacuated from the college but each of them misfires and now they are into one big plot that is sure to kick him out. But this time, something goes haywire and Rohit is killed. The gang somehow buries him in a forest, but the Commissioner Sudeep Hariharan who is after the case is more than intimidating for them to handle. Each one in the group gets mysteriously killed by Rohit's supposed spirit. Joe gets killed in an anatomy lab, by hanging; Rakhi gets beaten to death in a forest; Anand is tied up and left on the road, where a truck runs over him; Anu is killed in a hospital using a scalpel. Satheesh is suspected for these murders. He gets arrested for Rohit's murder but gets released on bail after a false evidence given by a police officer, who is Satheesh's man. That night Sudeep catches them and confirms that Satheesh's fate will be the same.

After many twist and turns, Sudeep discovers that Rohit is alive and arrests him from Satheesh's house where Rohit was trying to kill him. On questioning, Rohit reveals that his real name is Ananthakrishnan and the real Rohit died in an accident 6 months ago. He also admits that he had murdered Satheesh's friends on purpose. Digging deeper, Sudeep gets to know his flashback where it is revealed that Athira, was actually Ananthakrishnan's love interest. On the night of her death, she was speaking to Ananthakrishnan in phone and kept it connected, where Ananthakrishnan witnessed her last breath. From then on, his mind was only up for revenge and the tussle that happened between him and the gang was planned by him to infuriate them. Sudeep understands Rohit's plight and ensures him justice he deserves. However, Rohit takes a vow to kill Satheesh.

The next day, Ananthakrishnan is taken to Satheesh by the policeman, who was Satheesh's right hand man. After a prolonged fight, Ananthakrishnan, despite warning from Sudeep, kills Satheesh by strangling him with his handcuff and throwing him down a bridge. Sudeep and his team stay helpless. Ananthakrishnan, though convinced that his revenge is finally done, surrenders to Sudeep.

== Cast ==
- Indrajith Sukumaran as Ananthakrishnan / Rohit Menon
- Biju Menon as Commissioner Sudeep Hariharan IPS
- Rayan Raj as Satheesh Ramakrishnan
- Sandhya as Anu Ramachandran
- Dhanya Mary Varghese as Rakhi
- Sajith Raj as Anand
- Govind Padmasoorya as Joe Joseph
- Jagathy Sreekumar as Philip Pothen, College Principal
- Saikumar as Minister Ramakrishnan, Satheesh's father
- Suraj Venjaramoodu as Shine Raj (Munthirippadam)
- Priya Nair as Amala
- Abu Salim as CI Augustine
- Appa Haja as SI Vijayakumar
- Dinesh Panicker as Ramachandran, Anu's father
- Geetha Vijayan as Malathi, Satheesh's mother
- Lishoy as Joseph, Joe's father
- Mohan Jose as Manavalan Mathai
- Chembil Ashokan as MLA Keshavan Kutty
- Vijay Menon as Dr. Ravindranath KN
- Sasi Kalinga as SI Mortuary Mohanan
- Venu Nagavally as Rohit Menon's father
- Krishna as the real Rohit Menon (photo presence)
- Bhama as Athira (cameo appearance)

== Production ==
The film was shot during June 2010.

== Soundtrack ==
Music by Ronnie Raphael.

Song	Singer(s)	Duration (m:ss)
"Jaganu Jaganu Thaka"	Shankar Mahadevan	5:23
"Vennilavin Chirakileri" (male)	Srinivas	4:34
"Thumbipenne"	Jassie Gift, Afsal, Rimi Tony, Kripa	3:59
"Vennilavin Chirakileri" (female)	Shweta Mohan	4:34
Theme Music	Ronnie Raphael	2:16

== Reception ==
A critic from Sify wrote that "College Days could be a classic case of not using the resources well. One gets the feeling that if it was approached with more passion and discipline, it could have been a nicer movie".
