= RJ Sharon =

Indian author (born 1989)

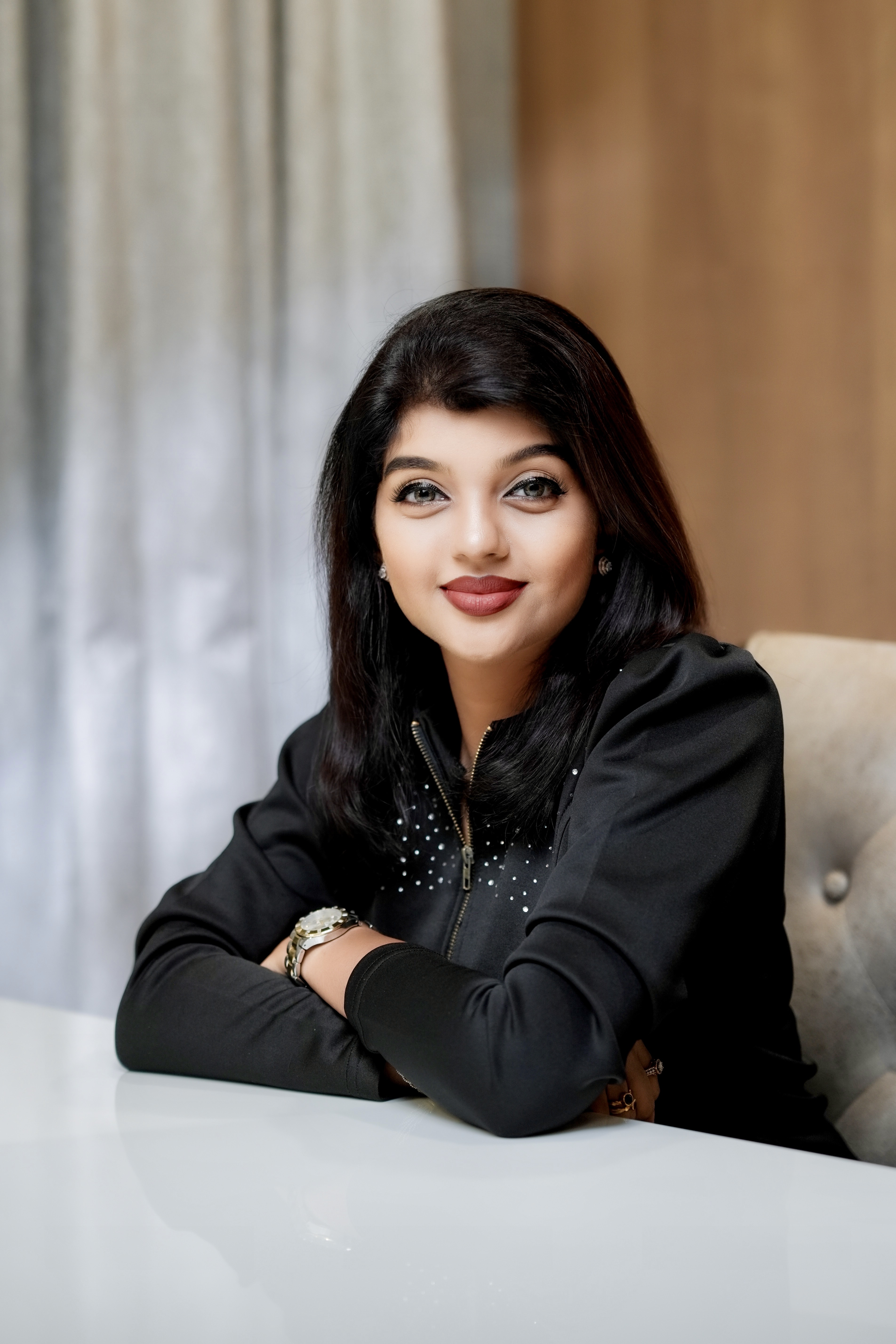

Background information
- Born: 17 July 1989 (age 37); Pune, Maharashtra, India
- Genre: World . Pop . Rock . Hard rock . Melody . Folk . Gospel
- Occupation: Author – radio jockey – lyricist – singer
- Years active: 2000–present
- Labels: Muzik 247, Satyam Audios, Goodwill Entertainments, Divo Music, Joron Records

RJ Sharon, is an Indian author of the thriller genre, playback singer and lyricist from Kerala who sings in six languages: Malayalam, Tamil, Telugu, Hindi, Marathi and English. She pens lyrics in the English and Hindi Language. She started her career as a playback singer in the Malayalam movie Hangover in 2014.

== Personal life ==
Sharon was born to a Roman Catholic Syrian Christian family from Kottayam, Kerala on 17 July 1989. She has been born and brought up in Pune, Maharashtra. She started learning Carnatic music at the age of 4 under Mrs. Meenakshi Subramanian.

== Career ==
Before stepping into her full-time Music Career, Sharon was working in Pune with Suzlon, until the time she got married. A Post graduate in Business Administration, Sharon debuted as a playback singer in 2014 with the song Vellithingal a duet opposite Najim Arshad in debutant Sreejith Sukumaran's Malayalam film Hangover under music director Mejo Joseph. She is also a vocalist and lyricist for several Ad Films in Malayalam, Hindi and English. She has sung for a number of Christian and Hindu Devotional Albums, the first one being cut, when she was aged 10.

She went on to debut as a Lyricist in Hindi with Priyadarshan's Oppam starring Mohanlal for the song Pala Naalaayi and also lent vocals for the same in 2016. She has also sung a duet Sisira Vaanil alongside Musical Maestro K. J. Yesudas for the movie Chinna Dada in the same year.

She is currently a Radio Jockey with Sargakshetra 89.6 FM, a radio station headquartered at Kottayam. She debuted as an Author through her Parapsychological Thriller Novel titled TERRORS OF MIDNIGHT that released on Christmas 2023.

== Music Awards and Nominations ==
Year	Category	Nominated Song	Result
2019	Mazhavil Music Awards (Best Duet Song)	Enthanee Mounam	Nominated
2026	Inter Continental Music Awards 2026 (Best Asian Pop)	Meri Pyari Pari	Won

== Literary Awards and Nominations ==
Year	Award	Nominated work	Result	Ref.
2025	Sahitya Sparsh Awards – Season 3	Terrors of Midnight	Won	
2024	Rabindranath Tagore Literature Award 2024 by DRDC Global	Terrors of Midnight	Won	
2024	Salis Mania Best Mystery and Thriller Book (Editor's Choice) 2024	Terrors of Midnight	Nominated	
2025	Auther Awards by JK Paper and Times of India (Popular Choice Award) 2025	Terrors of Midnight	Nominated	

== Accolades and awards ==
Year	Award	Category	Result	Ref.
2026	Woman Changemaker Awards 2026	Creative Excellence Woman Changemaker 2026	Won	
2026	Golden Tagore Award	Contribution to Literature	Won	
2026	FEMINEHER Oscar Lumina Award (AIAAAEF)	Creative Excellence in Multidisciplinary Arts	Won	
2025	Women of the Year Awards 2025 (HERStory Times)	Women Who Lead	Won	
2025	Top 10 Rising Star Awards 2025 (Heighs of Success Magazine)	Rising Star Woman Author and Artist	Won	

== Discography and Filmography ==
=== Films - Singles - Web Series ===
Year	Song	Film	Music	Co-singers	Language
2026	Score	EYES (Web Series)	Sharon Joseph		Hindi (Lyrics)
2026	Score	The Third Murder	Sharon Joseph		Hindi (Lyrics)
2026	Single	YOURS	Sharon Joseph		English (Lyrics and Vocals)
2026	Single	Meri Pyari Pari	Sharon Joseph		Hindi (Lyrics and Vocals)
2026	Single	Eeshoye Ente Daivame	Fr. Antony Urulianickal CMI		Malayalam (Vocals)
2025	Single	The Ache of You	Sharon Joseph		English (Lyrics and Vocals)
2025	Score	Mr & Mrs Bachelor	P S Jayhari		English (Lyrics)
2025	Score	Oru Ronaldo Chitram	Revi Deepak		English (Lyrics)
2022	Mystery	Naale	Mejo Joseph		English (Vocals and Lyrics)
2021	Sound of Love	Innu Muthal	Mejo Joseph	Various Artists	Korean
2021	Mathurapathinezhukaari	Chiri	Prince George	Karthik	Malayalam
2021	Etho Janma Kalpanayil	Mohan Kumar Fans	Prince George		Malayalam
2021	Mausam	Innu Muthal	Mejo Joseph	Javed Ali	Hindi (Lyrics)
2019	Araaro	Vijay Superum Pournamiyum	Prince George	Prince George	Malayalam
2019	Enthanee Mounam	Vijay Superum Pournamiyum	Prince George	Karthik	Malayalam
2017	Trailer Edit	C/O Saira Banu	Mejo Joseph	Various Artists	Malayalam
2017	Prathiroju Pilla	Kanupapa	4 Musics	Various Artists	Telugu/Hindi
2016	Pala Naalaayi	Oppam	4 Musics	Various Artists	Malayalam/Hindi (Lyrics)
2016	Shishiravaanil	Chinna Dada	Sumesh Kootickal	K. J. Yesudas	Malayalam
2014	Vellithingal	Hangover	Mejo Joseph	Najim Arshad	Malayalam
2009	Kathal Konjum	Swetha 5/10 Wellington Road	Surya		Tamil

=== Cameo Appearances ===
Year	Film
2017	Sunday Holiday
2021	Mohan Kumar Fans

=== Ad films ===
Year	Brand	Music	Role
2025	Favorite Homes	Mejo Joseph	Lyricist
2023	Lifecare Pharmaceuticals	Mejo Joseph	Lyricist/Vocalist
2021	Walkaroo	Mejo Joseph	Lyricist/Vocalist
2021	Khind	Mejo Joseph	Lyricist/Vocalist
2020	Favourite Homes	Mejo Joseph	Lyricist/Vocalist
2019	Sujata Fans		Scripting (Hindi)
2018	Lifecare Adult Pullups	Mejo Joseph	Lyricist/Vocalist
2018	KIMS Liver Transplant	Mejo Joseph	Lyricist
2017	Osko Builders	Eapen Kuruvilla	Lyricist
2017	Joy Alukkas	Mejo Joseph	Vocalist
2016	Somans	Mejo Joseph	Vocalist/Lyricist
2016	Kitex Scoobee Day Bags	Eapen Kuruvilla	Voice of Scoobee/Vocalist/Lyricist (DUBBED)
2016	Mahalekshmi Silks the Classics	Mejo Joseph	Vocalist
2015	Kent Palm	Mejo Joseph	Vocalist/Lyricist
2015	Kitex Dezire	Mejo Joseph	Vocalist/Lyricist
2015	Kitex Trawellday	Mejo Joseph	Vocalist/Lyricist
2015	Asset Homes	Eapen Kuruvilla	Vocalist
2015	Pulari Rice Bran Oil	P.S. Jayhari	Vocalist
2015	Milan Design	Anil Johnson	Vocalist
2014	Koya's Maya Supreme	Eapen Kuruvilla	Vocalist
2014	Mahalekshmi Sliks	Mejo Joseph	Vocalist
2014	Sreerosh Properties	Eapen Kuruvilla	Vocalist/Lyricist
2014	Popular Finance	Anil Johnson	Vocalist

=== Albums ===
Year	Album	Music	Type	Language
2020	Paavan Aatma – SINGLE	Fr. Joby Pulickan CMI	Gospel Music	Hindi
2019	Madhurorma	Fr. Anthony Urulianickal CMI	Gospel Music	Malayalam
2019	Manwah (Lyrical)	Prashanth Mohanan	World Music	Hindi
2018	There is No Goodbye – SINGLE (Lyrical)	Mejo Joseph	Pop	English
2017	Destiny – The Dream – SINGLE	Mejo Joseph	Pop	English
2017	Let's take a Break	Ranjith Meleppatt	Pop	Malayalam
2016	Perinbam	David Bright	Gospel music	Tamil
2016	Genesis	Mejo Joseph, P. S. Jayhari and Sharon Joseph	World music	Hindi, Tamil and Malayalam
2016	Hrudyam	Fr. Michael Koottumkal MCBS and Fr. Mathews Payyappilly MCBS	Gospel music	Malayalam
2016	Karunakadal	Santosh Thomas and Lisy Santosh	Gospel music	Malayalam
2015	Revival Songs	Sebin and K. M. Solomon	Gospel music	Hindi
2015	Nuhra	Biju Kanjirappally	Gospel music	Malayalam
2015	Yeshuvinte Thiruraktham	Santosh Thomas and Lisy Santosh	Gospel music	Malayalam
2015	Amme Njaan Jeevichotte	Santosh Thomas and Lisy Santosh	Gospel music	Malayalam
2008	Eeshoyude Swandam Alphonsa	Job Kuruvilla	Gospel music	Malayalam
2008	Sanjeevni	Fr. Ashok M.S.T. and Jacob Koratty	Gospel music	Hindi
2008	Ormayil Ennum	Job Kuruvilla	Folk	Malayalam
2008	Sanjeevni	Fr. Ashok M.S.T. and Jacob Koratty	Gospel music	Hindi
2008	Yaagam Kaalvari Yaagam	Sumesh Koottickal	Gospel music	Malayalam
2008	Ende Nasraayan	Sumesh Koottickal	Gospel music	Malayalam
2007	Missed Call	Sumesh Koottickal	Pop	Malayalam
2007	Divine Mercy	Sumesh Koottickal	Gospel music	Malayalam
2006	Muzhukkappu	Sumesh Koottickal	Folk	Malayalam
2004	Daivakrupa	Joji Johns	Gospel music	Malayalam
2004	Stotram Thriyeka	Joji Johns	Gospel music	Malayalam
2004	Paadum Njaan Yeshuvinai	Joji Johns	Gospel music	Malayalam
2000	Akshayam	Fr. Anthony Urulianickal CMI	Gospel music	Malayalam
