= RJ Balaji =

Indian actor (born 1980)

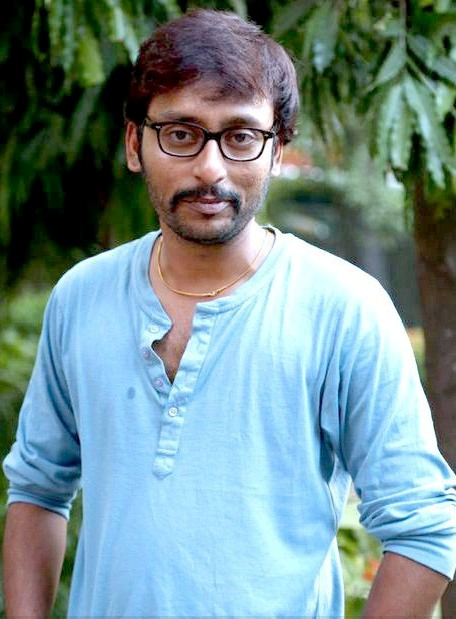
- Balaji in 2014
- Born: Balaji Patturaj; 20 June 1985 (age 41); Chennai, Tamil Nadu, India
- Education: Kumararani Meena Muthiah College of Arts and Science
- Occupations: Radio jockey, presenter, actor, comedian, cricket commentator, director, singer and lyricist
- Years active: 2006–present
- Spouse: Divya
- Children: 2

Balaji Patturaj (born 20 June 1985), popularly known as RJ Balaji, is an Indian radio jockey, actor, television presenter, comedian and film director in Chennai, Tamil Nadu. He is best known as the host of the 92.7 Big FM shows The Night Show with RJ Balaji, Take it Easy and its now-defunct segment Cross Talk, in which he made prank calls to unsuspecting victims.

Originally a radio jockey, Balaji is also active in other fields; he is known for his association with the television shows Ungalil Yaar Adutha Prabhu Dheva and Why This Kolaveri, and for his performance in the films Theeya Velai Seiyyanum Kumaru (2013), Vadacurry (2014) Naanum Rowdy Dhaan (2015), Pugazh (2016) and LKG (2019) (as a lead actor), Mookuthi Amman (2020), Veetla Vishesham (2022) (as a lead actor and a co-director) and Karuppu (2026) (debut as the solo director). He has also been a presenter at many inter-school cultural events in Chennai, a cricket commentator, and has contributed to many social causes, such as providing relief support to the victims of the 2015 South India floods along with other actors.

== Early life ==
Balaji was born on 20 June, and was raised in Chennai, Tamil Nadu. He has four siblings: one younger brother and three younger sisters. He said that his father abandoned his family at an unspecified point. Balaji told Sudhish Kamath in 2013 that he changed 27 houses and 11 schools while growing up in Chennai because his "mother just cannot stay in one place. She would move from Perambur to Thiruvanmiyur to Mylapore... no place close to each other." When he was in college, Balaji realised that his strength was in interaction and that the attention and acclaim he received in his college cultural gave him confidence and he realised that he had to be in the media.

After completing his BSc computer science from the Kumararani Meena Muthiah College of Arts in 2006, Balaji joined the Amrita School of Communication in Coimbatore for a Postgraduate Diploma in Journalism, because he wanted to become like his cousin who worked at NDTV, but when he was asked to write a report on his hostel's canteen, the 56-word report contained 47 grammatical errors, and he soon realised that English journalism was not what he specialised in. At that time he saw a newspaper advertisement of a radio station (Radio Mirchi Coimbatore) that auditioned for RJs (radio jockeys) and he applied for it, though he "never knew what an RJ was back then". He said that he almost did not get selected then when he sang a gaana but was finally selected in November 2006. He has not completed his journalism course since.

== Career ==
=== Radio ===
Balaji started his career as a radio jockey at Radio Mirchi Coimbatore, where he hosted a three-hour morning drive show called Hello Coimbatore which dealt with social issues. After four years he quit the job as he "didn't want to sound angry all the time" and returned to Chennai where his family and friends were living. He joined at 92.7 Big FM because they gave him the freedom to plan and design his four-hour slot; thus the show Take it Easy was conceived. The evening prime-time show was created to give people a "break from the serious stuff that they have to deal with during work hours and relax with the nonsense". Balaji created another segment in Take it Easy, titled Cross Talk, where he made prank calls to unsuspecting victims, nominated by a friend, cousin, co-worker or neighbour. On how the segment developed, Balaji said, "I was assigned to do a serious socially-relevant show in the beginning but Big [FM] gave me the chance to talk about anything in Take It Easy. Once when I was talking to a couple about something serious, people who listened found it funny. That's how Cross Talk happened". Balaji described Radio Mirchi's Senthil Kumar, who taught him a radio and its basics at Coimbatore, as his favourite RJ, and said, "whatever I am right now is because of him."

Cross Talk became very popular among youths; Balaji uploaded several clips of the show on SoundCloud. The links went viral, crossing over a million hits in a single week. Besides India, most of the downloads were in the United States (over 20%), United Arab Emirates, Singapore, Seychelles, Germany and Spain. The show earned him the moniker "Cross Talk Balaji". In November 2011, Balaji and BIG FM RJ's Muthu and Ophelia conducted "Little RJ Hunt", a three-phased event organised as part of the radio station's Children's Day celebrations. Balaji won the RJ of the Year (Tamil) and Best Programme Broadcast after 11 am (Tamil) awards for Take it Easy at the 2012 Indian Excellence in Radio Awards. Later he was named among the Top 10 Promising Personalities of Tamil Nadu in 2012 by Ananda Vikatan Group. Balaji was the host for the 2013 event "BIG Manasa Thotta Singer" that was conducted by BIG FM. He has also been running the "RJ Balaji Skool of Radio Studies" since August 2013. Three apps on Balaji have been developed: an Android app simply named "RJ Balaji", an iOS app titled "RJ Balaji Official", and a Windows Phone app as well.

In December 2012, Balaji discontinued Cross Talk, in response to the suicide of Jacintha Saldanha. In November 2013, he decided to stop the segment 120 Rs. on his show where he reviewed Tamil films after he had been severely criticised by actors and producers from the Tamil film industry. Via Twitter, he announced, "I am a normal guy who wants to do good work every day and go home happy. I can't really handle the aftermath of every show on films. After a lot of thought, I have decided not to speak about films until there's tolerance and maturity among certain people from film fraternity, which is most unlikely to happen. So, '120 show' is no more". He further stated, "I don't want to keep taking my work home. I have a one-and-half-year-old child and my wife is concerned about the phone calls I keep getting". As of July 2014, the show still runs, where he only reviews Hindi and English-language films. In July 2013, Balaji said that he would try remaining a radio jockey for at least 15 years, which he believes "no one has done in Chennai", and reiterated this in November 2015.

After India's Minister of Information and Broadcasting Prakash Javadekar told in the Rajya Sabha that legal action would be taken against radio jockeys who ridicule members of parliament, Balaji in August 2014 cryptically told Deccan Chronicle, "When I was a teenager I would fight with my sister for a room. Today parliamentarians are doing the same thing, fighting like teenagers. How can I not make fun of them?", while fearing that even television anchors like Arnab Goswami and Rajdeep Sardesai would be banned soon. In January 2015, Balaji, radio jockeys Girigiri, Ananthi, Mirdhula and actor R. Sarathkumar contributed to "Kodu Kondadu", an initiative by BIG FM and the non-governmental organisation BHUMI to supply impoverished children with stationery, toys and books. In February, he was a host of the BIG Tamil Melody Awards at Chennai Trade Centre. In July 2015, Balaji launched a new show titled Loose Talk. The following month, he left with many other Indian RJs for Siachen to conduct a program titled "BIG Paigham – Sarhad Ke Naam" saluting the Indian Army. In January 2016, he won the Ananda Vikatan Awards for Promising Personality of Tamil Nadu and RJ of the Year. In April 2017, Balaji launched a new BIG FM show titled The Night Show with RJ Balaji.

=== Presenter ===
Alongside his radio career, Balaji has been active in other fields as well. He stated, "It is nice to do a lot of things so that you are constantly on your feet". In September 2011, he judged Channel Surfing, a segment of Smaraneeyam, the inter-school cultural festival of Sri Sankara Senior Secondary School. Balaji was a performer at Sri Sivasubramaniya Nadar College of Engineering's annual cultural festival Instincts in March 2012. He hosted the teaser trailer release event for Maattrraan in June 2012. In August 2012, Balaji was a guest performer at the fourth anniversary celebrations of Kiruthiga Udhayanidhi's magazine Inbox 1305. He has conducted the event Mr. and Ms. Techofes at the College of Engineering, Guindy's annual cultural event Techofes twice, in 2012 and 2013. He was also the compère of the audio launch of Kalyana Samayal Saadham, which took place in August 2013. In July 2013, Balaji was the judge of Reflector, an event in Vidya Mandir's interschool cultural event Reflections. On 30 August, he was a judge at Padma Seshadri Bala Bhavan's cultural event Reverberations. At the 2015 edition of Techofes at the Guindy College of Engineering, he hosted a new show titled Boost with Balaji on 14 February.

=== Cinema ===
In Puthagam (2013), Balaji introduces the lead characters played by Sathya, Sanjay, Vignesh, Rakul Preet Singh and Aishwarya Rajesh in a voice-over. In the same year, he made a cameo appearance in Ethir Neechal and made his full-fledged acting debut in Theeya Velai Seiyyanum Kumaru. He appeared in a brief role as a show host in Vallinam (2014). His second film appearance in 2014 was in Vaayai Moodi Pesavum. In 2015, he appeared in Idhu Enna Maayam,Yatchanand Naanum Rowdy Dhaan. For his performance in Naanum Rowdydhaan, Balaji won the SIIMA Award for Best Comedian. In 2016, he appeared in Jil Jung Juk and Pugazh, where he also worked as a singer and lyricist on the song "Podu Podu". In Muthina Kathirika (2016), Balaji introduces the main characters, including protagonist Muthupandi (Sundar C) through a voiceover. He then appeared in Devi, Kadavul Irukaan Kumaru (2016), Parandhu Sella Vaa (2016), Kaatru Veliyidai (2017), Spyder (2017) and Kee (2017). RJ Balaji became a full-fledged hero with LKG (2019). The film has emerged as a blockbuster at the Tamil Nadu box office. His directorial debut is Mookuthi Amman (2020) with Nayanthara in the lead. He later acted, directed a comedy-drama film, Veetla Vishesham (2022), a remake of 2018 Hindi blockbuster Badhaai Ho. The action thriller Run Baby Run (2023) had received a positive response from audience. In 2024, he was seen in the films Singapore Saloon and Sorgavaasal. Later, he directed the action drama film Karuppu (2026), starring Suriya in the lead role.

=== Television ===
Balaji was a host in the second season of STAR Vijay's dance show Ungalil Yaar Adutha Prabhu Dheva. He was the host of Zee Tamizh's Why This Kolaveri, a loose adaptation of the American reality show Killer Karaoke, which premiered in December 2013, and ended in May 2014. In August 2014, Balaji hosted the show Aiyo Amma Awards, a spoof of the Vijay Awards, on Zee Tamizh.

=== Other works ===
In December 2011, Balaji participated in "Namma Ooru Website Creation Competition", an initiative jointly organised by IIT Madras' Rural Technology and Business Incubator and the National Internet Exchange of India to disseminate village-specific information and create an identity for villages. In March 2014, he claimed to have been a presenter at Sangarsh, an annual charity concert that raises money for people suffering from various diseases. The same month, he gave an intro in "The Madras Song", a tribute to the 375th anniversary of Chennai, formerly known as Madras.

In November 2014, Balaji created "Panjumittai Productions", a YouTube channel where he uploads short videos dealing with contemporary issues. The first video uploaded to the channel is "Kai Phone Video 01: RJ Balaji's Biriyani!!!", featuring Balaji distributing parcels of biryani to impoverished people on the road. The second, "Kai Phone Video 02: RJ Balaji's 501 Views Success Party!!!", is a satire on the "success parties" that production companies host to celebrate the apparent box office success of their films. The third video, subtitled "RJ Balaji Abusing Sachin Tendulkar..!", has nothing to do with Sachin Tendulkar, but instead features Balaji asking the viewers to spread word so that a heart transplant patient named Kavya could get a heart donor. The video was deliberately titled misleadingly so that the message would spread sooner. On 12 December, less than two weeks after Balaji uploaded the video, Kavya successfully got a donor.

Balaji has also played in the 2015 edition of the Celebrity Cricket League, for the team Chennai Rhinos as an all-rounder. In May 2015, he was a speaker at the first edition of TEDx Mylapore. In August, he joined Ananda Vikatan and Raghava Lawrence's campaign "Aram Seiya Virumbu". During the 2015 South India floods, Balaji and actor Siddharth provided relief support to many of the floods' victims, through a movement known as "Chennai Micro". For his actions, Balaji received the CNN-News18 Indian of the Year award in the category of "Public Service". In January, Balaji was featured in "The Most Important Job", a four-minute video by the Murugappa Group that pays tribute to Indian farmers. Following the March 2016 suicide of Abhinath, a student of Sri Sai Ram Engineering College whose suicide was attributed by the college's authorities to him being unhappy about studying engineering, and protesting students claiming it to be the result of his treatment by the authorities, a video of a speech by Balaji was released in the internet; in that speech he urged corporate firms to "go beyond pass percentages and exam results when choosing colleges for campus recruitments". The video received over 180,000 views. In January 2017, Balaji participated in the pro-Jalikattu protests. From the following year, he began working as a Tamil cricket commentator for the Indian Premier League.

== Artistry ==
Balaji describes "nonsense humour and nonstop talking" as his unique selling proposition. He also describes conversation as his strength and states that his humour comes out of talking to people. Although he frequently talks about films on the radio, he never entertains gossip on the personal life of actors, due to his lack of interest in the same. He is notorious for his attacks on the English language and his jocular criticism of Tamil films, but popular for his irreverent sense of unique humour. According to photographer Bhargavii Mani of The Hindu, the frequent echoing of the words "Ada" and "Cha" on Balaji's radio shows make them "exciting". Although known to be vivacious, loud and funny in the media, Balaji has also maintained a "rather soft-spoken, shy" personality. In a 2013 interview, Balaji said that he inherited his sense of humour from his mother, who he called "the funniest person I know ... I have only 10 percent of her comic ability".

== Personal life ==
Balaji was married at the age of 21 years, and has two sons. Although known to actively perform social services, Balaji does not consider himself a social worker or disaster manager: "I am just someone who wants to help people, and I will just do that."

== Filmography ==
Key
†	Denotes productions that have not yet been released

Year	Title	Role	Notes
2013	Puthagam	Narrator	Voice role
2013	Ethir Neechal	Himself	Cameo appearance
2013	Theeya Velai Seiyyanum Kumaru	Karnan	Also narrator
2014	Vallinam	Show host	Cameo appearance
2014	Vaayai Moodi Pesavum	Himself	Tamil version only; cameo appearance as an RJ
2014	Vadacurry	Karikalan	
2015	Idhu Enna Maayam	Arun's friend	
2015	Yatchan	Chandru	
2015	Naanum Rowdy Dhaan	Doshi Baba	SIIMA Award for Best Comedian; IIFA Utsavam Award for Best Comedian
2016	Jil Jung Juk	Wealthy youth	Cameo appearance
2016	Pugazh	Balaji	Also singer and lyricist
2016	Muthina Kathirika	Voice only	
2016	Devi	Ganesan (Tamil) / Yellow T-shirt man (Telugu/Hindi)	Trilingual film; cameo appearance in Telugu and Hindi versions
2016	Abhinetri / Tutak Tutak Tutiya	Ganesan (Tamil) / Yellow T-shirt man (Telugu/Hindi)	Trilingual film; cameo appearance in Telugu and Hindi versions
2016	Kadavul Irukaan Kumaru	Balaji	
2016	Kavalai Vendam	Natraj	
2016	Parandhu Sella Vaa	Mark	
2017	Kaatru Veliyidai	Illyaas Hussain	
2017	Ivan Thanthiran	Balaji	
2017	Spyder	Vinay (Tamil) / Madhu (Telugu)	Bilingual film
2017	Velaikkaran	Sriram	
2018	Thaanaa Serndha Koottam	Pallavaram Paranjothi Pandiyan	
2018	Diya	Raghavan	
2019	LKG	Lalgudi Karuppaiah Gandhi (LKG)	First Lead Role
2019	Boomerang	Shanmugam	
2019	Kee	Mark	
2019	Devi 2	Ganesh	
2020	Mookuthi Amman	Engels Ramasamy	Directional debut; also co-director
2022	Veetla Vishesham	Ilango	Also co-director
2023	Run Baby Run	Sathya	
2024	Singapore Saloon	Kathir	
2024	Sorgavaasal	Parthi	
2026	Karuppu	Baby Kannan (BK), Usilampatti Karuppaiah Gandhi (UKG)	Also director; dual roles

=== As director ===
Year	Title	Notes
2020	Mookuthi Amman	Debut film
2022	Veetla Vishesham	Remake of Badhaai Ho
2026	Karuppu	

=== Television ===
Year	Title	Role	Channel	Notes
2023	Bharathi Kannamma	Himself	Star Vijay	Cameo appearance

== Discography ==
Year	Title	Song	Notes
2019	Puppy	"Soththumoottai"	
2022	Veetla Vishesham	"Daddy Song"	
