= Killer Karaoke =

- Genre: Game show
- Based on: Sing If You Can
- Starring: Steve-O; Mark McGrath
- Narrated by: Dee Snider; Minae Noji
- Country of origin: United States
- Original language: English
- No. of seasons: 2
- No. of episodes: 16

Production
- Executive producers: Natalka Znak; Claire O'Donohoe; David Hurwitz; Noah Bonnett; Michael Dietz; Tony Yates; James Rowley
- Producers: Ethan Kruger; Eric Mills
- Production locations: Sunset Bronson Studios; Hollywood, California
- Editor: Ben Delamont
- Running time: 40 to 43 minutes
- Production company: Zodiak USA

Original release
- Network: truTV
- Release: November 23, 2012 – April 17, 2014

Killer Karaoke is an American karaoke game show that was broadcast on the truTV cable channel. The series debuted on November 23, 2012 and features contestants attempting to sing in front of a live studio audience while various bizarre attempts are made to disrupt their performances. It is based on the British game show Sing If You Can. In the first season, the program was presented by Steve-O with Dee Snider as the announcer. It was announced on September 16, 2013, that the series has been renewed for an eight-episode second season with Mark McGrath replacing Steve-O as host. Steve-O said that he was fired after expressing his discomfort with the show's treatment of animals.

Season 2 premiered on February 20, 2014, and the full season premiere episode has been uploaded on truTV's YouTube channel on February 18.

== Format ==
=== Season 1 ===
Six different contestants appear in each show. They are separated into three preliminary rounds of two contestants, and each have approximately 90 seconds to sing their song. Contestants are introduced to the audience and told their challenge. Before every challenge, Steve-O tells the contestant: "No matter what happens, do not stop singing." The winner for each round is picked by the live studio audience via popular vote and is automatically advanced into the Killer Karaoke Final Showdown.

=== Season 2 ===
==== Round 1 ====
Six contestants take turns singing portions of one song, occasionally being given electric shocks or sprayed with water from their microphones to distract them. They are scored on a combination of audience response and accuracy of pitch and lyrics, and these scores are used to assign rankings to the players for further rounds. The lowest-ranked player is immediately eliminated.

==== Round 2 ====
The second through fifth-ranked players go through two battle rounds, with the #2 seed facing the #5 seed, and the #3 seed facing the #4 seed. In each battle round, the higher-ranked player's choices determine who plays which challenge. Winners are determined by the same method as in Round 1.

In the #3/#4 round, #3 is presented with a choice of two objects, each of which corresponds to a different challenge. The challenges themselves are revealed only after he/she has chosen one object, and #4 takes the challenge for the other one. #3 takes his/her turn first.

In the #2/#5 round, #2 is shown one challenge and can either take it or pass it to #5 in favor of an unknown one. The known challenge is always played first, regardless of who receives it.

A third battle round is then played, in which #1 takes a challenge. The audience then selects one of the two losing players from the previous battle rounds, and that player takes a different challenge that incorporates an object/element chosen by #1 from two options.

After this round, two of the three winners are selected by audience vote to continue in the game.

== Challenges ==
- Big Stank - The contestant (usually female) sings while being sandwich-danced by two sweaty 500-pound strippers
- Bite Club / Leader of the Pack - The contestant gets attacked and bitten by a series of guard dogs while wearing a heavily-padded suit. Usually, the contestant will have to deliver six packages no matter what happens.
- Blown Away - The contestant stands in front of three large fans for a "full-body facial - Steve-O style", while holding a rope steady to prevent a bucket of water above the singer from tipping over and drenching the contestant. The facial includes a strong adhesive, oatmeal and paprika, along with another surprise or two throughout the song.
- Bull in a China Shop - The contestant wears a rubber suit and tries to grab all of the cash he/she can find. Usually, wherever the cash is found, something happens to that item that you can find the money on. (Falls, spills water, etc.) At the end, there are people in costumes who stand still, and after a while start to attack the contestant.
- Cactus Maze - The contestant wears a velcro suit on which balloons are stuck. Then, he/she is given drunk (blurry vision) goggles to wear and advised to walk through a makeshift desert maze filled with cacti, on a trail that is clearly marked. As the singer walks through the maze, landslides may fall on them and Steve-O may blow an air horn into the contestant's ears. At the end of the maze, there is a tree with cash attached to it, however, unbeknownst to the contestant, the tree also has pythons on it, which Steve-O reveals to the contestant by removing the goggles before they can take the money.
- Flip Your Lid - The contestant has a clear dog cone on his/her head. Then, he/she stands on a platform, pulling a lever. After the lever is pulled, something nasty will come out (maggots, cow brains, dirty socks, etc.) and be poured into the cone. The items are then dumped in a bowl.
- Hair Raiser - The contestant (usually male) sits back in a barber's chair and has various body hair removed by way of a strip wax treatment.
- Head Case - The contestant has to stick his/her head or hand in various cases, with each case containing creatures and a USD$50 bill. One case usually holds a stuffed animal to confuse the contestant.
- Party In My Pants - The contestant has to deliver items to many tables, while wearing a suit that causes balloons to inflate and pop inside of them.
- Petting Zoo - The contestant has to grab money out of animals possessions (a dog, snapping geckos, lizard, porcupines, camel, etc.).
- Puppet Master / Why Are You Hitting Yourself - The contestant gets in a suit with a man who controls their actions throughout the song.
- Rocking Chairs - The contestant has to sit on many different chairs, which each chair has their own danger. (Vibrating, spinning, breakaway, etc.)
- Shock Therapy 1 / Power Lunch - The contestant tries to serve Steve-O dinner with shock collars and bracelets placed on his/her body. All of the food and drinks are served to Steve-O in open glasses, bowls, or containers, making them easy to spill or dump on the stage. Ironically, when the food is served without it being spilled, Steve-O usually does not eat it, and he just throws it behind the table onto the stage, or he will take one sip of the drink before throwing the entire glass behind him.
- Shock Therapy 2 - The contestant again tries to sing while wearing shock collars and bracelets. The goal is to walk over a staircase/platform and serve drinks on a table. To shock the singer, someone in the background pulls down on a large switch. The contestant also wears gloves for protection.
- Swamp Swing / Troubled Waters - The contestant sits on a swing and gets dipped into ice-cold water with snakes, and sometimes other reptiles, dumped in.
- Tiny Dancer - The contestant has to put their head in a hole while their hands and feet are controlled by others. Then, the controllers control their actions throughout the song. (Puts food into their face, breaking concrete, etc.)
- Twist N' Shout - The contestant has to complete five stations that have two buckets above him/her. Then, the contestant picks a bucket and pulls the crank, causing the bucket to spill something out (leaves, strawberry milk, cow tongue, etc.)
- Walk of Fear / Road To Nowhere - The contestant "strolls down the catwalk" barefoot and steps into as many as six boxes under the walk containing various items and creatures, including ice water, fish guts, and maggots.
- Walk the Line - The contestant is spun around on a platform and then has to walk on a red line. Around the line, there is something to harm you (mouse traps, jagged ice, etc.) Sometimes, there is some money to grab while dizzy.

== Final showdown ==
=== Season 1 ===
The three preliminary round winners battle against each other for up to $10,000 in prize money while singing on the "World's Largest Turntable," a spinning disk approximately eight feet in diameter and decorated with a radiation warning symbol. The jackpot grows throughout the round; as time passes, the turntable speeds up and begins to tilt, and the jackpot grows at a faster rate. The first two players to fall off win nothing; once the last player falls off, the jackpot stops building and he/she wins it. If the player can stay on the turntable for 90 seconds, he/she wins the full $10,000. To date, the largest amount won is $7,800 in episode 104.

=== Season 2 ===
The two finalists wear suits with $10,000 cash attached to them, and must go through three obstacles designed to cause the money to fall off while singing the same song. Once they complete the obstacles, they return to center stage as clear boxes are lowered onto their heads and filled with one of their worst fears. The player with the higher score, based on audience response and technical accuracy, wins the competition and gets to keep whatever money is still attached to his/her suit.

== Episodes ==
=== Series overview ===
Season	Episodes	Originally released	
Season	Episodes	First released	Last released
1	8	November 23, 2012	January 25, 2013
2	8	February 20, 2014	April 17, 2014

=== Season 1 (2012–13) ===
No. overall	No. in season	Title	Original release date	U.S. viewers (millions)
1	1	"Episode 105"	November 23, 2012	1.20
2	2	"Episode 103"	November 30, 2012	0.83
3	3	"Episode 107"	December 7, 2012	0.73
4	4	"Episode 104"	December 28, 2012	0.85
5	5	"Episode 102"	January 4, 2013	0.95
6	6	"Episode 108"	January 11, 2013	0.89
7	7	"Episode 106"	January 18, 2013	0.99
8	8	"Episode 101"	January 25, 2013	0.87

Note: Episodes are not broadcast in truTV episode number order.

=== Season 2 (2014) ===
No. overall	No. in season	Title	Original release date	U.S. viewers (millions)
9	1	"Mark Mcgrath's Killer Debut"	February 20, 2014	N/A
10	2	"Melody and Maggots"	February 27, 2014	N/A
11	3	"Shock and Roll!"	March 6, 2014	N/A
12	4	"Balloon Suit Boogie"	March 13, 2014	N/A
13	5	"Chords and Camels"	March 27, 2014	N/A
14	6	"Lyrics and Lizards"	April 3, 2014	N/A
15	7	"Solos and Sewer Rats"	April 10, 2014	N/A
16	8	"Rhythm and Emus"	April 17, 2014	N/A
