= List of Kannada films of 2005 =

Within the cinema of India, the following is a list of Kannada films of 2005.

A good year for Kannada films, Shivanna's Jogi clinches the top spot with smashing box office records and a cult status.

Puneeth's hit, Aakash sharing alongside Ramya whose another film Amrithadhare bought in good numbers. Critically, Beru that started H.G Dattatreya and Neethu won the National Film Award for Best Kannada Film, Tara bringing the National Award for Best Actress for Haseena and Shanti starring Bhavana making it to the Guinness Book of World Records had the industry proud with major recognitions.

However, new talents from the refreshing super hit film, Nenapirali made Prem an overnight star with leading ladies Vidhya Venkatesh and Varsha getting their big break.

== Highest grossing films ==
Rank	Title	Collection	Ref.
1.	Jogi	₹35 crore (₹125.99 crore in 2025)	
2.	Aakash	₹17 crore (₹61.19 crore in 2025)	
3.	Ayya	₹15 crore (₹53.99 crore in 2025)	
4.	Amrithadhare	₹12 crore (₹43.19 crore in 2025)	
5.	Auto Shankar	₹9 crore (₹32.39 crore in 2025)	

== List of released films in 2005 ==
=== January–June ===
Opening		Title	Director	Cast	Music Director	Genre	Notes
J A N	7th	Nanage Neenu Ninage Naanu	B Subramanya	Rakesh Siddaramaiah, Sangeetha Shetty	Praveen D Rao	Romance	
J A N	14th	Maharaja	Om Sai Prakash	Sudeep, Nikita Thukral, Ashok	S. A. Rajkumar	Action	
J A N	14th	Mahasadhvi Mallamma	Renuka Sharma	Meena, Rajendra Prasad, Saikumar, Sridhar	Sri Shailam	Drama	
J A N	21st	Rishi	Prakash	Shiva Rajkumar, Vijay Raghavendra, Radhika Kumaraswamy, Sindhu Tolani	Gurukiran	Comedy / Drama	
J A N	21st	Zabardast	Ram Bharath Devan	Bhushan Kumar, Rashmi Kulkarni	Gandharva	Romance	
J A N	21st	Olave	P. H. Vishwanath	Vishal Hegde, Harish, Sandhya	Hemanth	Romance	
J A N	28th	Surya The Great	Rushi	Ajay Rao, Shivani	Samson	Action	
F E B	4th	Yashwanth	Dayal Padmanabhan	Sri Murali, Rakshita, Ramesh Bhat	Mani Sharma	Romance	
F E B	11th	Ayya	Om Prakash Rao	Darshan, Rakshita	V. Ravichandran	Action	
F E B	11th	Encounter Dayanayak	D. Rajendra Babu	Sachin, Spoorthi	R. P. Patnaik	Action / Crime	
F E B	18th	Shadyantra	Rajesh Murthy	Harish Raj, Namratha	Prakash Sontakki	Drama	
F E B	18th	Udees	P. N. Sathya	Mayur Patel, Sonali Joshi	Venkat Narayan	Action	
M A R	4th	Beru	P. Sheshadri	Suchendra Prasad, Neetha, H. G. Dattatreya, T. N. Seetharam	Praveen Kiran	Drama / Documentary	
M A R	4th	Aadi	M. S. Ramesh	Auditya, Ramya, Avinash	Gurukiran	Action	
M A R	4th	Shanti	Baraguru Ramachandrappa	Bhavana	Hamsalekha	Drama	Guinness record film
M A R	4th	Hendathiyobbalu Maneyolagiddare	V. Umakanth	Krishne Gowda, Sharan, Namratha, Doddanna	Abhi	Comedy	
M A R	4th	Gadipaar	S. S. David	Charanraj, Vinod Alva, Bhavya, Rami Reddy	M S Maruthi	Action	
M A R	18th	Moorkha	A. N. Jayaramaiah	Kashinath, Namratha, Bhavya, Bank Janardhan, Karibasavaiah	V. Manohar	Comedy	
M A R	18th	Inspector Jhansi	H. Vasu	Prema, Anand	Dilip Sen - Sameer Sen	Action	
M A R	25th	Ranachandi	B. R. Keshav	Prema, Naveen Mayur, Shobhraj	M. S. Maruthi	Action	
M A R	25th	Rakshasa	Sadhu Kokila	Shiva Rajkumar, Gajala, Ruthika, Kishore, Avinash, Rangayana Raghu	Sadhu Kokila	Action	
A P R	1st	Jootata	N. S. Shankar	Dhyan, Richa Pallod, Akash	R. P. Patnaik	Comedy	Remake of Malayalam film Poochakkoru Mookkuthi
A P R	1st	Kashi from Village	Om Sai Prakash	Sudeep, Rakshita, Harsha, Bank Janardhan, Sathya Prakash	Koti	Action	
A P R	8th	Preethisu	Siddaraju	Vishal Hegde, Ashwini	Teja	Romance	
A P R	15th	Navabharathi	K. Ganesh	Sourav, Usha Kiran	Raj Bhaskar	Romance / Drama	
A P R	22nd	Varsha	S. Narayan	Vishnuvardhan, Ramesh Aravind, Manya, Komal Kumar, Anu Prabhakar, Doddanna	S. A. Rajkumar	Drama	Remake of Malayalam film Hitler
A P R	29th	Aakash	Mahesh Babu	Puneeth Rajkumar, Ramya, Avinash, Kishore	R. P. Patnaik	Action / Romance	
M A Y	6th	Karnana Sampathu	Shantaram Kanagal	Ambareesh, Tara, Prakash Rai	Guru	Action	Re-released
M A Y	13th	Gunna	Dwarki	Mayur Patel, Chaitra Hallikeri, Rangayana Raghu, Sudeep	Mahesh	Action	
M A Y	20th	Mr. Bakra	Vasanth	Jaggesh, Rohini, Srinivasa Murthy, Mukhyamantri Chandru	V. Manohar	Comedy	
M A Y	27th	Aham Premasmi	V. Ravichandran	V. Ravichandran, Balaji, Aarti Chabria	V. Ravichandran	Romance	
J U N	3rd	Gowramma	Naganna	Upendra, Ramya, Ramesh Bhat, Srinivasa Murthy	S. A. Rajkumar	Drama	Remake of Telugu film Nuvvu Naaku Nachav
J U N	10th	Shastri	P. N. Sathya	Darshan, Manya, Bullet Prakash	Sadhu Kokila	Action	
J U N	17th	Nan Love Madthiya	Venkatswamy	Dileep Raj, Deepa, Ananth Nag	Hamsalekha	Romance	
J U N	17th	Magic Ajji	Dinesh Babu	Khushbu, Sudharani, Ramesh Bhat, Master Tejas	Aadhi	Fantasy / Horror	
J U N	17th	Yaake	V. Rajendra Kumar	Raghav, Divya Gowda	M N Krupakar	Mystery	
J U N	24th	Giri	Ravicharan	Srinagar Kitty, Preethi, Muni, Shobha	Chakri	Comedy	
J U N	24th	Ugra Narasimha	Surya	Mohan Shankar, Madhu Sharma, Sharath Lohitashwa	Rajesh Ramanath	Action	
J U N	24th	O Gulabiye	Narendra Babu	Vivek Beedu, Mallika, Suhasini	M. N. Krupakar	Romance	

=== July – December ===
Opening		Title	Director	Cast	Music Director	Genre	Notes
J U L	1st	Sye	Arun Prasad	Sudeep, Kanika Subramaniam, Avinash, Pasupathy	Gurukiran	Action	
J U L	1st	Hudgeeru Saar Hudgeeru	Lingaraj Kaggal	Mohan Shankar, Sangeetha Shetty	S. P. Chandrakanth	Comedy	
J U L	8th	Masala	Dayal Padmanabhan	Sunil Raoh, Radhika Kumaraswamy, Vishal Hegde, Ramesh Bhat	Sadhu Kokila	Romance / Comedy	
J U L	22nd	Siddu	Mahesh Sukhadhare	Sri Murali, Deepu, Tara, Sihi Kahi Chandru	R. P. Patnaik	Action	
J U L	29th	Valmiki	M S Ramesh	Shivrajkumar, Hrishitaa Bhatt, Lakshmi Rai, Avinash, Srinivasa Murthy	Gurukiran	Action	
A U G	4th	News	M. K. Maheshwar	Upendra, Renuka Menon, Reemma Sen, Nassar, Avinash	Gurukiran	Action	
A U G	5th	Mental Manja	Sai Sagar	Arjun, Sheetal Ramachandran, Srinath, Girija Lokesh	Sai Sagar	Drama	
A U G	12th	Thunta	Om Prakash Rao	Balaji, Ekta Khosla	V. Ravichandran	Romance	
A U G	12th	Siri Chandana	Rajkishore	Suryavardhan, Chethan	S. A. Rajkumar	Drama	
A U G	12th	Abhinandane	N. Ramachandra Rao	Ramkumar, Sudharani, Anu, Yeshwanth	K. Kalyan	Drama	
A U G	19th	Jogi	Prem	Shiva Rajkumar, Jennifer Kotwal, Arundhati Nag, Ramesh Bhat, Sanket Kashi	Gurukiran	Action / Drama	
A U G	19th	Green Signal	Eeshwar Balegundi	Ajay Rao, Ashitha, Vishal Hegde, Ashwini	Venkat-Narayan	Romance	
A U G	26th	Deadly Soma	Ravi Srivatsa	Auditya, Rakshita, Tara, Devaraj, Avinash	Sadhu Kokila	Action	
S E P	2nd	Live Band	B. R. Keshav	Nagesh Mayya, Sneha	M. N. Krupakar	Adult drama	
S E P	9th	Auto Shankar	D. Rajendra Babu	Upendra, Shilpa Shetty, Radhika Kumaraswamy, Sudharani	Gurukiran	Action	
S E P	9th	Namma Basava	Veera Shankar	Puneeth Rajkumar, Gowri Munjal, Sudharani, Tara, Kota Srinivasa Rao	Gurukiran	Action	
S E P	9th	Yauvana	Jayasimha Musuri	Nithin, Lakshmi Musuri	Gopi Krishna	Adult romance	
S E P	16th	Amrithadhare	Nagathihalli Chandrashekar	Dhyan, Ramya, Bhavya, Avinash, Amitabh Bachchan	Mano Murthy	Drama / Romance	
S E P	16th	Haseena	Girish Kasaravalli	Tara, Chandrahasa Alva	Isaac Thomas Kottukapally	Drama	Based on novel by Banu Mushtaq
S E P	23rd	Boyfriend	D. R. Jana	Dileep Raj, Rathi, Abhinayasri	K M Indra	Romance / Drama	
S E P	30th	Swamy	M. S. Ramesh	Darshan, Gayatri Jayaraman, Avinash, Rangayana Raghu	Gurukiran	Action	
O C T	7th	Samarasimha Nayaka	Lingaraj Kaggal	Abhijeeth, Rashmi Kulkarni, Srinath, Tara	M. N. Krupakar	Action	
O C T	21st	Shambu	Dwarki	Sri Murali, Manya, Avinash, Rangayana Raghu	Ramesh Krishnan	Romance	
O C T	24th	Hai Chinnu	Shivaji Rao Ghorpade	Nithin, Mohini Patel	Gopi Krishna	Romance	
N O V	4th	Anna Thangi	Om Sai Prakash	Shiva Rajkumar, Radhika Kumaraswamy, Sudharani, Deepu, Vishal Hegde, Doddanna	Hamsalekha	Family Drama	
N O V	18th	Nammanna	N. Shankar	Sudeep, Anjala Zhaveri, Asha Saini, Ashish Vidyarthi, Kota Srinivasa Rao	Gurukiran	Action	
N O V	18th	Lathi Charge	B. Ramamurthy	Thriller Manju, Mohan Shankar, Dharma	Gopi Krishna	Action	
N O V	26th	Love Story	Bharati Kannan	Mayur Patel, Tanu Roy, Komal Kumar, Nizhalgal Ravi, Pramila Joshai	S. A. Rajkumar	Romance	Remake of Hindi film Ek Duuje Ke Liye
N O V	26th	Good Bad Ugly	Tiger Prabhakar	Tiger Prabhakar, Nisha	Tiger Prabhakar	Adult romance	
D E C	2nd	Nenapirali	Ratnaja	Prem Kumar, Varsha, Vidhya Venkatesh, Naveen Krishna	Hamsalekha	Romance	
D E C	9th	Rama Shama Bhama	Ramesh Aravind	Kamal Haasan, Ramesh Aravind, Shruti, Urvashi, Daisy Bopanna, Aniruddha Jatkar	Gurukiran	Comedy	Remake of Tamil film Sathi Leelavathi
D E C	16th	Sakha Sakhi	Dayal Padmanabhan	Sunil Raoh, Chaya Singh, Doddanna, Vinayak Joshi, Sadhu Kokila	Sadhu Kokila	Comedy / Romance	Remake of Tamil film Thiruda Thirudi
D E C	23rd	Vishnu Sena	Naganna	Vishnuvardhan, Ramesh Aravind, Ananth Nag, Gurleen Chopra, Lakshmi Gopalaswamy	Deva	Drama	Remake of Tamil film Ramanaa
D E C	30th	Dr. B. R. Ambedkar	Sharan Kumar Kabbur	Vishnukanth, Tara, Bhavya	Abhimann Roy	Biopic	
D E C	30th	Pandu Ranga Vittala	Dinesh Babu	V. Ravichandran, Prema, Rambha, Shruti, Komal Kumar	V. Ravichandran	Comedy	
