= Kishore filmography =

Filmography article

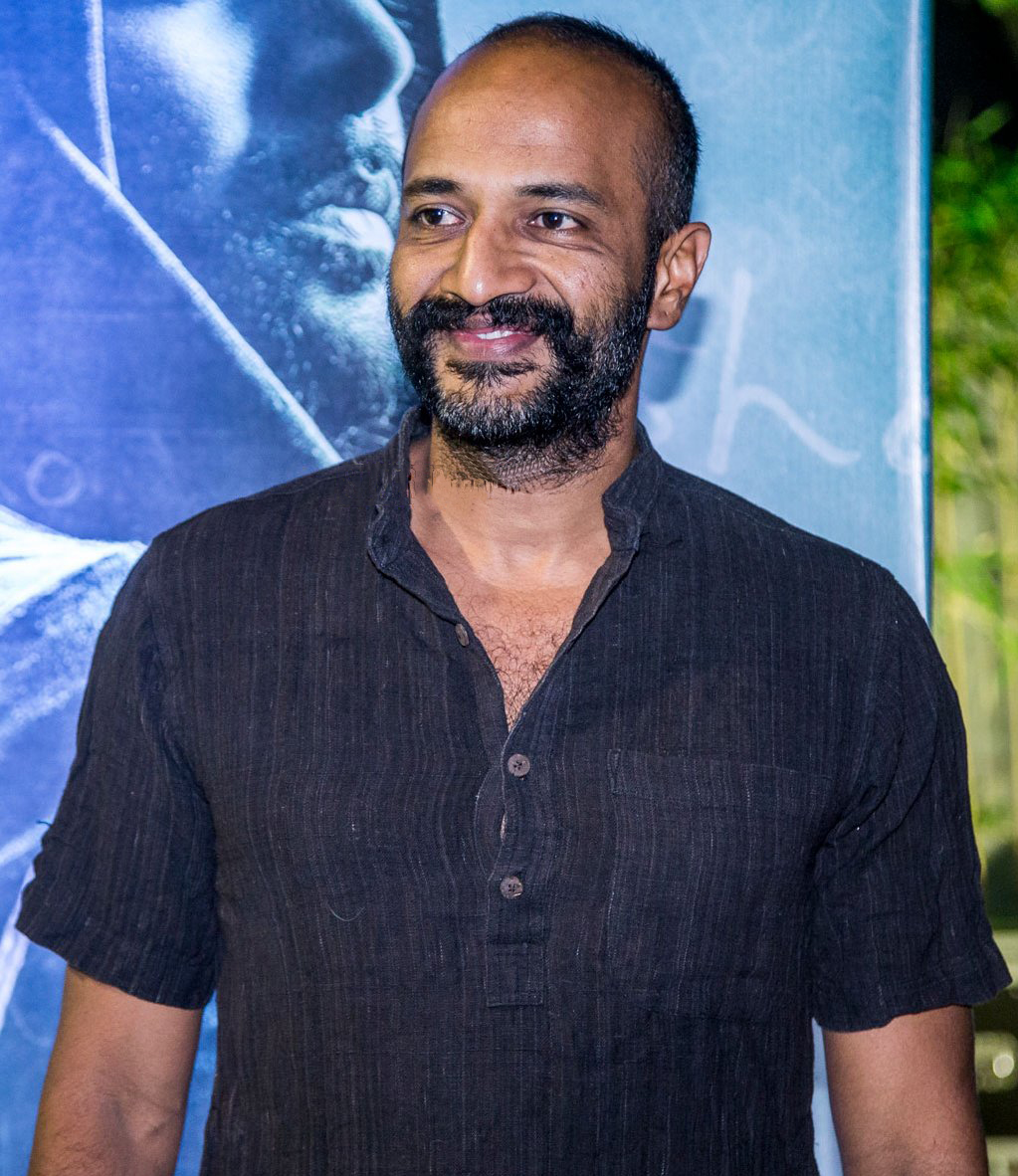
Kishore at Yaar Ivan audio launch

Kishore is an Indian actor who predominantly works in Kannada, Tamil, and Telugu films, in addition to a few Malayalam and Hindi films

== Filmography ==
=== Kannada ===
Key
†	Denotes films that have not yet been released

Year	Title	Role	Notes	Ref.
2004	Kanti	Beera	Karnataka State Film Award for Best Supporting Actor (also for Rakshasa)	
2005	Rakshasa	Shabbir		
2005	Akash	Chidanand		
2005	Deadly Soma	Naga		
2005	Vishnu Sena	Badrinath's son		
2006	Shubham	Priya's brother		
2006	Ashoka			
2006	Ambi			
2006	Gandugali Kumara Rama			
2006	Kannadada Kanda			
2006	Student			
2006	Kallarali Hoovagi	Mohiddin		
2007	Duniya	Umesh Kumar		
2007	Masti			
2007	Kshana Kshana	Kishore		
2007	Agrahara	Bhaktavatsala's mentor		
2007	Guna	Mumbai don		
2007	Geleya	Don Bhandari		
2008	Gooli	ACP Devaraj		
2008	Inthi Ninna Preethiya	Kishore		
2008	Zindagi	Police officer		
2008	Akka Thangi	Huliyappa		
2009	Nanda			
2009	Birugaali	Inspector		
2009	Baaji	Abdul Khan		
2009	Black			
2009	Kabaddi	Beeresh		
2009	Jeeva			
2009	Kallara Santhe			
2010	Ugragami			
2010	Shabari			
2010	Dildaara			
2010	Parole	Uttappa		
2010	Gang Leader			
2010	Yaksha			
2010	Huli	Chandappa Huliyal		
2011	Ee Sanje	Balli		
2011	Bhramara			
2011	9 to 12	Munna		
2012	Bhagirathi	Maadevaraya		
2012	Shiva			
2013	Attahasa	Veerappan		
2013	Jatta	Jatta		
2014	Ulidavaru Kandanthe	Munna (Pranayaraja)		
2015	Missed Call			
2015	Vascodigama	Vasu D. Gamanahalli "Vascodigama"		
2015	Octopus	Yashwanth		
2016	Kiragoorina Gayyaligalu	Kaale Gowda		
2016	Bheeshma			
2019	Udgharsha	Menon		
2019	Devaki	Inspector		
2019	Nanna Prakara	Ashok		
2019	Katha Sangama	Father		
2019	Chambal			
2020	Shivarjuna	Nandeesha		
2020	Thundhaikal Sahavasa			
2021	Buy 1 Get 1 Free	Manmatha		
2022	Kantara	Murali		
2022	Samharini			
2023	Pentagon	Kadamba Ramachandrappa	Anthology film; segment Karma	
2024	Yuva	Veeranna Doddamani		
2024	Kabandha	Hanuma		
2025	Guns and Roses	Assistant commissioner of police		
2025	Anamadheya Ashok Kumar	Praveen Rajashekar		
2025	Shanubhogara Magalu	Tipu Sultan	Cameo	
2025	Thaayi Kasthur Gandhi	Mahatma Gandhi		
2025	Elumale	Inspector P. Venkatesh Nayak		
2025	Amruthamathi	Yashodhara		
2025	Kamal Sridevi	Rakesh		
2026	Mahakavi †	Pampa		

=== Tamil ===
Key
†	Denotes films that have not yet been released

Year	Title	Role	Notes	Ref.
2007	Polladhavan	Selvam	Won—Vijay Award for Best Villain	
2008	Jayamkondaan	Guna		
2008	Silambattam	Duraisingham		
2009	Vennila Kabadi Kuzhu	Savadamuthu		
2009	Thoranai	Guru		
2009	Muthirai	Commissioner		
2010	Porkkalam	Karnan		
2010	Bayam Ariyaan	Mithran		
2010	Vamsam	Rathinam		
2011	Aadukalam	Dorai		
2011	Mudhal Idam	Karuppu Balu		
2013	Haridas	Sivadas		
2013	Ponmaalai Pozhudhu	Arjun's father		
2013	Arrambam	Prakash		
2014	Koottam	Chatru		
2015	Thilagar	Bose Pandian		
2015	Thoongaa Vanam	Dhiraviyam		
2016	Visaranai	Auditor K.K.		
2016	Kabali	Veerasekaran		
2016	Rekka	Selvam		
2016	Ilami	King	Cameo appearance	
2017	Nisabdham	A.C.P. Parvez Ahmed		
2017	Kalki	Kishore	Short film	
2017	Yaar Ivan	Prakash	Bilingual film	
2017	Kalathur Gramam	Kedathirukka		
2017	My Son Is Gay	Gopi		
2018	Kadikara Manithargal	Maran		
2018	Echcharikkai	David		
2018	Vada Chennai	Senthil		
2019	House Owner	Col. P. K. Vasudevan		
2019	Vennila Kabaddi Kuzhu 2	Savadamuthu		
2019	Mei	Muthukrishnan		
2019	Jada	Sethu		
2021	Maara	David		
2021	Sarpatta Parambarai	Munirathnam	Cameo appearance	
2021	Erida	Madhi Varma		
2021	Blood Money	Kaliyappan		
2022	Diary	Varadhan Annadurai's father		
2022	Drama	Arjun		
2022	Ponniyin Selvan: I	Ravidasan		
2022	Manja Kuruvi	Guna		
2023	Ponniyin Selvan: II	Ravidasan		
2023	Kolai	Babloo		
2023	Jailer	Jaffar	Cameo appearance	
2024	Vettaiyan	SP K. Harish Kumar		
2024	Viduthalai Part 2	KK		
2025	Kaliyugam	Sketch		
2025	Indian Penal Law	Gunasekaran		
2026	Mellisai			
2026	Kaalidas 2	Pandya		

=== Telugu ===
Key
†	Denotes films that have not yet been released

Year	Title	Role	Ref.
2006	Happy	ACP Rathnam	
2009	Pistha	Rambabu	
2010	Om Shanti		
2010	Bheemili Kabaddi Jattu	Kabaddi coach	
2012	Dammu	Chandravanshi King's second son	
2012	Krishnam Vande Jagadgurum		
2013	Dalam	Shatru	
2014	Karthikeya	Sahadev	
2014	Rowdy	Bhushan	
2014	Chandamama Kathalu	Sarathi	
2015	Calling Bell	Swamiji	
2015	Cheekati Rajyam	Mohan	
2017	Veedevadu	Prakash Varma	Bilingual film
2017	PSV Garuda Vega	George	
2019	Dorasaani	Shankaranna	
2019	Arjun Suravaram	Police Officer	
2019	Venky Mama	Major Anwar Sadat	
2022	Acharya	Basava's Aid	
2022	Shekar	Mallikarjun	
2022	Shikaaru	Devika's husband	
2025	Kaliyugam 2064	Shakti	
2025	Vrusshabha	Dr. Ajay	Partially reshot in Malayalam
2026	S Saraswathi		

=== Malayalam ===
Key
†	Denotes films that have not yet been released

Year	Title	Role	Notes	Ref.
2012	Thiruvambadi Thamban	Shakthivel		
2015	Acha Dhin	Antony Issac		
2016	Pulimurugan	R. Krishna "R. K" Kumar, Forest ranger		
2019	Mikhael	N.Sreenivasan		
2021	Erida	Madhi Varma	Simultaneously shot in Tamil	
2021	Djibouti			
2023	Kannur Squad	SP Manu Needhi Cholan		
2025	Vadakkan	Raman Perumalayan		
2025	L2: Empuraan	Karthik		

=== Hindi ===
Key
†	Denotes films that have not yet been released

Year	Title	Role	Ref.
2025	Sikandar	Inspector Prakash	
2025	Costao	D'Mello	

== Television ==
Year	Title	Role	Network	Language	Notes	Ref.
2019	High Priestess	Vikram	ZEE5	Telugu		
2019	The Family Man	Imran Pasha	Amazon Prime Video	Hindi		
2020	Addham	Ram	Aha	Telugu		
2020–2022	She	Nayak	Netflix	Hindi		
2021	Navarasa	Comrade	Netflix	Tamil	Anthology series; segment "Thunintha Pin"	
2022	Pettaikaali	Muththaiya	Aha	Tamil		
2023	Modern Love Chennai	Ravi	Amazon Prime Video	Tamil		
2024	Thalaimai Seyalagam	Tamil Nadu Chief MInister V. Arunachalam	ZEE5	Tamil		
2024	Parachute	Shanmugam	Disney+ Hotstar	Tamil		
