= 2004–05 Karnataka State Film Awards =

Annual Indian film awards ceremony

39th Karnataka State Film Awards
- Announced on: 21 September 2005
- Site: Bengaluru, Karnataka, India

Highlights
- Best Direction: Indrajith Lankesh; Monalisa
- Best Actor: Sriimurali; Kanti
- Best Actress: Shruti; Gowdru
- Most awards: Rakshasa (4)

The 2004–05 Karnataka State Film Awards, presented by Government of Karnataka, recognised the best of Kannada-language films released in the year 2004. The awards were announced on 21 September 2005.

== Lifetime achievement award ==
Name of Award	Awardee(s)	Awarded As
• Dr. Rajkumar Award • Puttanna Kanagal Award • Lifetime Contribution to Kannada Cinema Award	• M. P. Shankar • A. T. Raghu • Vajramuni • Chandulal Jain	• Supporting Actor, Producer, Writer • Director • Supporting Actor • Producer

== Jury ==
A committee headed by Kodalli Shivaram was appointed to evaluate the feature films awards.

== Film awards ==
Name of Award	Film	Producer	Director
First Best Film	Monalisa	K. S. Dushyanth	Indrajith Lankesh
Second Best Film	Beru	Navya Chithra	P. Sheshadri
Third Best Film	Gowdru	Sandesh Nagaraj	S. Mahendar
Best Film Of Social Concern	Haseena	Chiguru Chithra	Girish Kasaravalli
Best Children Film	Mithayi Mane		Aarathi

=== Other awards ===
Name of Award	Film	Awardee(s)
Best Direction	Monalisa	Indrajith Lankesh
Best Actor	Kanti	Sri Murali
Best Actress	Gowdru	Shruthi
Best Supporting Actor	Rakshasa	Kishore
Best Supporting Actress	Gowdru	B. Jaya
Best Child Actor	Rakshasa	Aniruddh
Best Child Actress	Haseena	Bodhini Bhargavi
Best Music Direction	Rakshasa	Sadhu Kokila
Best Male Playback Singer	Srusti ("Hrudayada Thumba")	S. P. Balasubrahmanyam
Best Female Playback Singer	Maharaja ("Kandamma Kandamma")	K. S. Chithra
Best Cinematography	Encounter Dayanayak	H. C. Venugopal
Best Editing	Kanti	T. Shashikumar
Best Lyrics	Beru	• Lakshmipathi Kolar • Krishnamurthy Hanur
Best Sound Recording	Rishi	Murali
Best Art Direction	Rakshasa	Dinesh Mangalore
Best Story Writer	Santhosha	M. R. Ramesh
Best Screenplay	Rishi	• Prakash • M. S. Abhishek
Best Dialogue Writer	Santhosha	B. A. Madhu
Best Male Dubbing Artist	Katheyaada Kaala	Shivamurthy
Best Female Dubbing Artist	Ranga SSLC	Deepa
Jury's Special Award	Kanchana Ganga	Mutturaj (For Costume Design)
