= Niyati Keni =

Niyati Keni is a novelist born in London to Indian parents. Her novel, Esperanza Street, was published by And Other Stories in 2015 and is set in the Philippines. She worked on its first draft as part of her studies for an MA in creative writing at Sheffield Hallam University, graduating in 2007. It was long-listed by The Guardian for its "Not the Booker" prize in 2015.

Keni is a qualified medical doctor, and is a palliative care physician. As of June 2019 she states that she is working on her second novel. She has published about misogyny in India on the website openDemocracy.
