= Iosi Havilio =

Argentine author (born 1974)

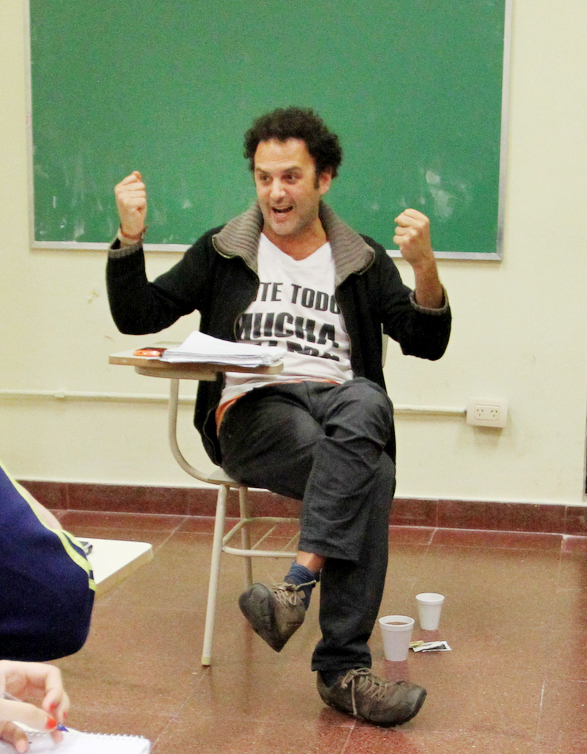
- Iosi Havilio guest lecturing at the University of Buenos Aires, 2015
- Born: Iosi Havilio; 1974 (age 51–52); Buenos Aires, Argentina
- Occupation: Author
- Notable work: Open Door, Paradises, Petite Fleur

Iosi Havilio (born 1974 in Buenos Aires) is an Argentine author. He's the son of Yugoslav-Argentine actor Harry Havilio.

== Life and career ==
His first novel, Open Door was published in Buenos Aires in 2006. The novel tells the story of a young woman that, after losing her job in Buenos Aires, finds herself drifting towards a very different pace of life in the countryside. Open Door was highly praised by influential writers and critics like Rodolfo Fogwill and Beatriz Sarlo. Sarlo commented : ‘Open Door really surprised me, it doesn’t obey any of the laws of reading, it feels like it sprang out of nowhere.’. In 2009, Open Door was published in Spain by Caballo de Troya.

In 2011, Open Door was translated into English by Beth Fowler and published in the United Kingdom by the And Other Stories.

Havilio took part in the anthology Buenos Aires/Escala 1:1 (Entropía, 2008) and the Spanish edition of La Joven Guardia (Belacqua, 2009). IN 2010, Havilio published his second work, Estocolmo. The main character of Estocolmo is a gay Chilean man returning to his home country from 30 years of exile in Sweden after the 1973 coup d'état.

And Other Stories published the English translation of Havilio's third novel, Paradises, in 2013 and his fifth, Petite Fleur, in 2017.

== Work ==
- Opendoor (Entropía, 2006). ISBN 9789872104092
- Estocolmo (Random House Mondadori, 2010). ISBN 9789876580595
- Paraísos (Random House Mondadori, 2012). ISBN 9789876581622
- La serenidad (Entropía, 2014). ISBN 9789871768158
- Pequeña Flor (Random House Mondadori, 2015). ISBN 9789873650673
- Jacki, la internet profunda (Socios Fundadores, 2018). ISBN 9789874286543
- Vuelta y vuelta (Random House Mondadori, 2019). ISBN 9789877690835

== Work in translation ==
- Open Door English trans. Beth Fowler (London: And Other Stories, 2011). ISBN 9781908276032
- Paradises English trans. Beth Fowler (London: And Other Stories, 2013). ISBN 9781908276247.
- Opendoor Italian trans. Barca Vincenzo (Roma: Caravan Edizioni, 2015). ISBN 9788896717097.
- Petite Fleur English trans. Lorna Scott Fox (London: And Other Stories, 2017). ISBN 9781911508045.
- Petite fleur (jamais ne meurt) French trans. Margot Nguyen-Béraud (Editions Denoël, 2017). ISBN 9782207134863.
