= Juan Pablo Villalobos =

Mexican author (born 1973)

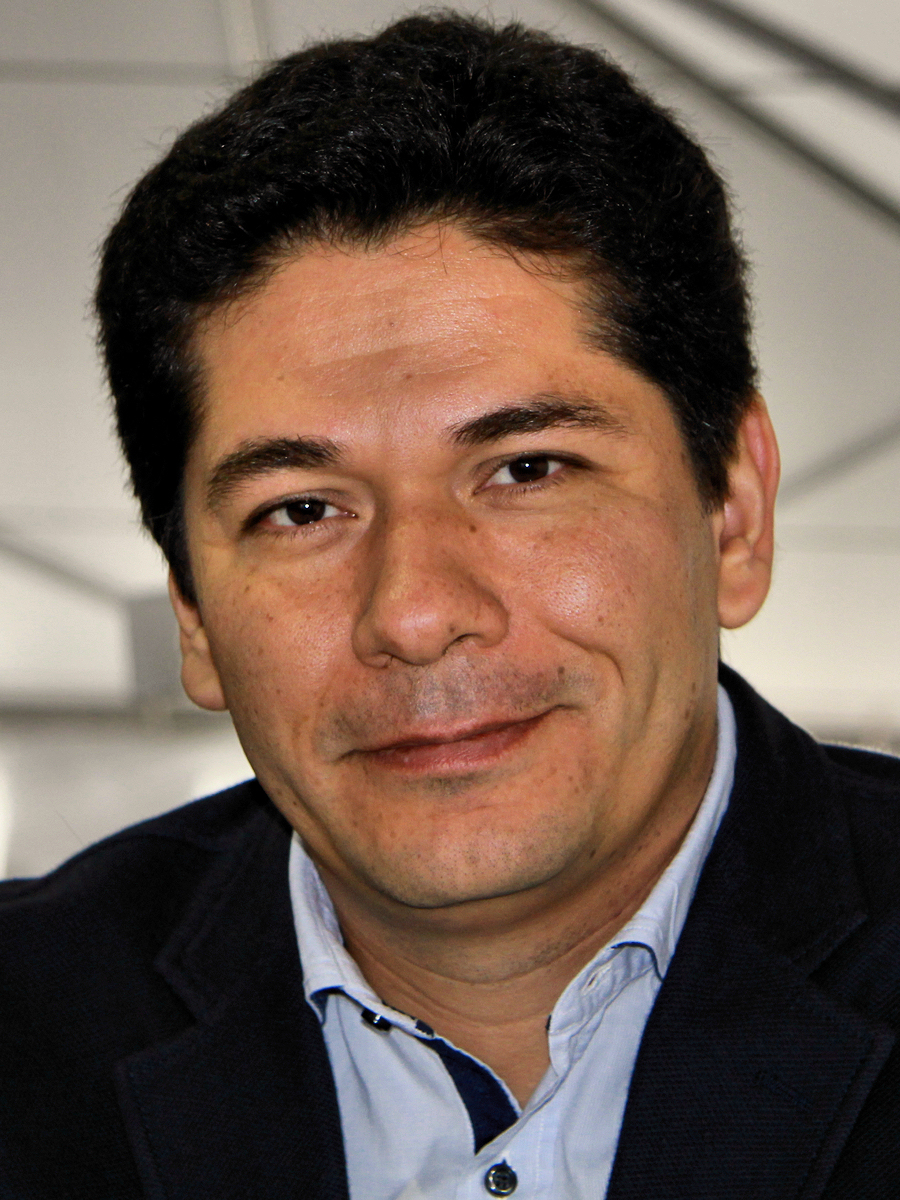
- Villalobos in 2012
- Born: 1973 (age 52–53); Guadalajara, Jalisco, Mexico
- Occupation: Author

Juan Pablo Villalobos (born 1973) is a Mexican author.

His debut novel, Down the Rabbit Hole, was published by And Other Stories in 2011 and was shortlisted for the Guardian First Book Award 2011. He is also the author of Quesadillas (2011) and I'll Sell You a Dog (2016).

His fourth novel, I Don't Expect Anyone to Believe Me, won the Herralde Prize.

He has lived in Mexico and Brazil, and currently resides in Spain with his wife and two children.

== Life ==
Villalobos was born in Guadalajara, Mexico, in 1973. He lived in Barcelona, Spain, for eight years, before moving to Brazil. In 2014, he moved back to Barcelona.

He studied marketing and Spanish literature. He has worked in market research and published travel stories, as well as literary and film criticism.

== Work ==
Villalobos's first book, Fiesta en la madriguera, has been translated into Portuguese, French, Italian, German, Romanian, Dutch and English. Its English translation, Down the Rabbit Hole by Rosalind Harvey, was published in September 2011 by the UK publishing house And Other Stories. Down the Rabbit Hole was shortlisted for the 2011 Guardian First Book Award.

His second novel, Quesadillas, was also translated by Rosalind Harvey and was published by And Other Stories in 2013.

His third novel, I'll Sell You a Dog, was published by And Other Stories in 2016.

His fourth novel, I Don't Expect Anyone to Believe Me, was published by And Other Stories in the United Kingdom on 30 April 2020, and in the United States on 5 May 2020.

=== Influences ===
Villalobos has said that his first book was inspired by Nellie Campobello's Cartucho, a collection of short stories set during the Mexican Revolution.

=== Reviews ===
In Germany, Villalobos is recognized as an important representative of the so-called "narco-literature." His book Fiesta en la madriguera has been called "a disillusioned domestic tale from the dark heartland of Latin American machismo".

== Bibliography ==
Novels

- Fiesta en la madriguera. Barcelona: Anagrama, 2010. ISBN 978-8433972125
  - Down the Rabbit Hole, trans. Rosalind Harvey. London: And Other Stories, 2011. ISBN 9781908276001
- Si viviéramos en un lugar normal, Barcelona: Anagrama, 2012. ISBN 9788433997531
  - Quesadillas, trans. Rosalind Harvey. London: And Other Stories, 2013. ISBN 9781908276223
- Te vendo un perro. Barcelona: Anagrama, 2015. ISBN 978-8433997852
  - I'll Sell You a Dog, trans. Rosalind Harvey. London: And Other Stories, 2016. ISBN 9781908276742
- No voy a pedirle a nadie que me crea, Barcelona: Anagrama, 2017. Winner of the 2016 Premio Herralde. ISBN 9788433998224
  - I Don't Expect Anyone to Believe Me, trans. Daniel Hahn. Sheffield: And Other Stories, 2020 ISBN 9781911508489
- Yo tuve un sueño: El viaje de los niños centroamericanos a Estados Unidos. Barcelona: Anagrama, 2019. ISBN 9788433926203
  - The Other Side: Stories of Central American Teen Refugees Who Dream of Crossing the Border, trans. Rosalind Harvey. New York. Farrar, Straus and Giroux, 2019. ISBN 9780374305734
- La invasion del pueblo del espíritu. Barcelona: Anagrama, 2020. ISBN 9788433998910
  - Invasion of the Spirit People, trans. Rosalind Harvey. London. And Other Stories, 2022. ISBN 9781913505363
- El pasado anda atrás de nosotros. Barcelona: Anagrama, 2024. ISBN 978-84-339-2226-7
  - The Past Pursues Us Like Detectives, Debt Collectors, Thieves, trans. Daniel Hahn. London. And Other Stories, 2026. ISBN 9781916751453
