= Christoph Simon =

Swiss writer (born 1972)

- Born: Christoph Simon; 1972 (age 53–54); Emmental, Switzerland
- Occupation: Author

Christoph Simon (born 1972) is a Swiss writer.

After travelling in the Middle East, Poland, South America, London and New York, he settled in Bern. His first novel, Franz, or Why Antelopes Run in Herds (2001) has sold over 10,000 copies, while Planet Obrist (2005) was nominated for the Ingeborg Bachmann Prize. Zbinden’s Progress is his fourth novel and was translated into English and published by And Other Stories in 2012.

== Life ==
Christoph Simon was born in 1972 in Emmental, Switzerland. He attended high school in Thun and the Jazz School in Bern. Later he traveled to Israel, Jordan, Egypt, Poland, South America, London and New York. He broke off his studies in Basel in 1997 and began to write, while doing various temporary jobs (post office, bank). He now lives as a freelance writer in Bern.

== Awards ==
- Winner of the Bern Literature Prize 2010.

== Works ==
=== Novels ===
- Zbinden's Progress trans. Donal McLaughlin. London: And Other Stories, 2012. ISBN 9781908276100
- Viel Gutes zum kleinen Preis (A lot of good for a small price) Bilger, Zürich 2011.
- Spaziergänger Zbinden (Zbinden's Progress) Bilger, Zürich 2010, ISBN 978-3-03-762005-2
- Planet Obrist(Planet Obrist) Bilger, Zürich 2005, ISBN 3-908010-75-6
- Luna Llena. Bilger, Zürich 2003, ISBN 3-908010-62-4
- Franz oder Warum Antilopen nebeneinander laufen (Franz or Why antelope Run in Herds) Bilger, Zürich 2001, ISBN 3-908010-51-9
