= Anamadheya Ashok Kumar =

Indian crime thriller film

- Theatrical release poster
- Directed by: Sagar Kumar
- Screenplay by: Sagar Kumar; Benny Thomas
- Starring: Kishore Kumar G; Harshil Koushik; Sudheendran Nair; Kanthraj Kiddipudi; Bhairav Muni; Veeresh K M; Gagana P.
- Cinematography: Sunil Honnali
- Edited by: K Yesu
- Music by: Azad
- Production company: SKN Films
- Distributed by: Janani Pictures
- Release date: 7 February 2025
- Running time: 1 hour 44 minutes
- Country: India
- Languages: Kannada, Tamil

Anamadheya Ashok Kumar is a 2025 Indian Kannada-language crime thriller film directed by Sagar Kumar. The film stars Kishore Kumar G., Harshil Koushik, Sudheendran Nair, Kanthraj Kiddipudi, Bhairav Muni, Veeresh K M, and Gagana P. The film follows an investigative journalist caught in a murder mystery while a determined police officer seeks to uncover the truth.

== Plot ==
The narrative centers on Praveen Rajashekar, an investigative journalist, who, during an interview with retired senior lawyer Anand Bhat, finds himself entangled in a murder investigation. When Bhat is found dead and Praveen is attacked by an unknown assailant, he kills the attacker in self-defense. As the case unfolds, Praveen becomes both a prime suspect and a key witness. Police officer Athirath B J takes on the case to uncover the truth behind the murders.

== Cast ==
- Kishore Kumar G as Praveen Rajashekar
- Harshil Koushik as Athirath B J
- Sudheendran Nair as Anand Bhat
- Kanthraj Kiddipudi as Rameshan
- Bhairav Muni as Bimanna
- Veeresh K M as Author
- Gagana P as Mithya

== Production ==
The film is directed by Sagar Kumar, who also co-wrote the screenplay alongside Benny Thomas. The cinematography is handled by Sunil Honnali, while Azad N composed the film's score. K Yesu served as the editor, and Danny Sheldon worked as the sound designer. The film was produced by SKN Films.

== Release ==
Anamadheya Ashok Kumar was released theatrically on 7 February 2025 by Janani Pictures.

== Reception ==
The film received mixed reviews for its narrative and performances. The Deccan Herald rated it 4 out of 5 stars, described the film as a "fast-paced thriller" that keeps the audience engaged. The Times of India rated it 3 out of 5 stars, praising its strong storyline and suspenseful execution.
