= Hare Rama Hare Krishna (2011 film) =

- Directed by: C. V. Ashok Kumar
- Written by: C. V. Ashok Kumar
- Produced by: K.Vinod Sindhia; K.Shivakumar
- Starring: Sri Murali; Pooja Gandhi; Nakshatra; Padma Vasanthi; Siddaraja Kalyankar; Achyuth Kumar; Kote Prabhakar
- Cinematography: P.K.H. Dass
- Edited by: T.Shashikumar
- Music by: Ilaiyaraaja
- Release date: 29 July 2011
- Running time: 119 minutes
- Country: India
- Language: Kannada

Hare Rama Hare Krishna is a 2011 Indian Kannada-language film directed by C. V. Ashok Kumar, starring Sri Murali and Pooja Gandhi.

== Plot ==
An unemployed guy, Anand bribes an official for a job, but when he doesn't get that job, Anand approaches the higher authority demanding the return of the money he paid. The officials frame him and put him behind the bar.

== Cast ==
- Sri Murali
- Pooja Gandhi
- Achyuth Kumar
- Nakshatra
- Padma Vasanthi
- Siddaraja Kalyankar
- Kote Prabhakar
- Ravi nayak

== Music ==
Hare Rama Hare Krishna

Soundtrack album by Ilaiyaraaja
- Released: 2011
- Recorded: 2011
- Genre: Feature film soundtrack
- Length: 22:34
- Language: Kannada

Ilaiyaraaja chronology
Azhagarsamiyin Kuthirai (2011)	Hare Rama Hare Krishna (2012)	Snehaveedu (2011)

Official audio
- Hare Rama Hare Krishna - Full Album on YouTube

Track listing
No.	Title	Singer(s)	Length
1.	"Baalu Idu Baalu"	K. J. Yesudas	5:06
2.	"Naanondu Bombe"	Kunal Ganjawala	5:16
3.	"Angel Angel"	Karthik, Rita	4:26
4.	"Hare Rama Hare Krishna"	Tippu	3:54
5.	"Kampuni Kampuni"	V V Prasanna, Ganga	4:32
Total length:			22:34

== Reception ==
=== Critical response ===
A critic from Bangalore Mirror wrote, "Then Ashok Kumar takes the film to a moralistic - cinematic heights by saying that all that was shown in the film never happened and Murali did not take up the 'job' of a rowdy. It was only a dream". B S Srivani from Deccan Herald wrote "But the second half, trudging on expected track kicks up a frantic pace. But that is until the audience realises that it has been had. A smart move from the director, but in a lost cause". A critic from News18 India wrote "Veteran actors Achyuth Kumar, Siddaraj Kalyan Kumar, Kari Subbu, Mico Nagaraj, Padmavasanthi have done a decent job, but it has not helped the film in any way. The film is bad enough to keep the audience out of the theaters. Avoid it".
