= Carlos Gamerro =

Argentinean novelist, critic, and translator

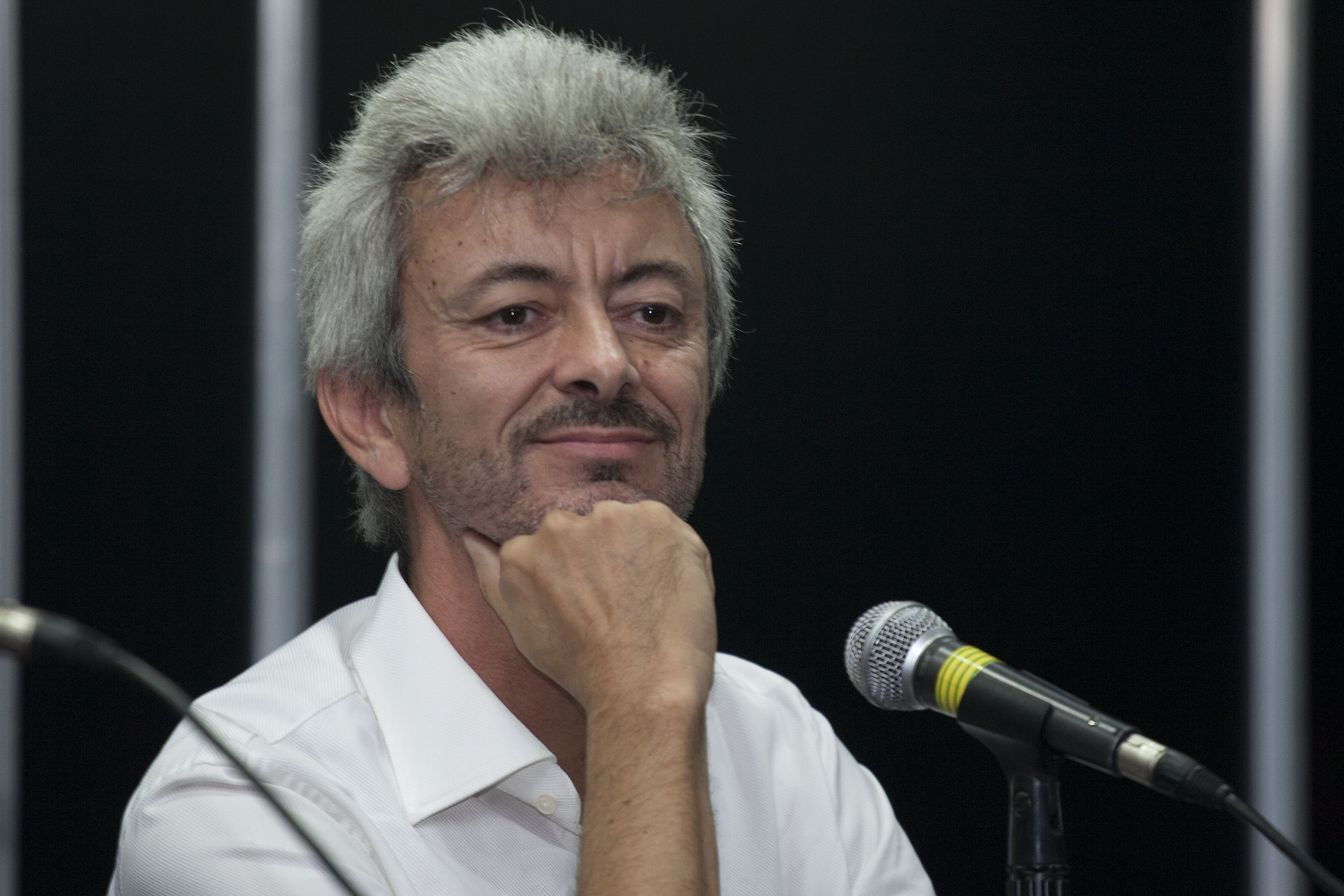
- Gamerro in 2015
- Born: Carlos Gamerro; 1962; Buenos Aires, Argentina
- Occupation: Author

Carlos Gamerro is an Argentinean novelist, critic, and translator. He was born in Buenos Aires in 1962.

Gamerro has published six works of fiction, including the novels The Islands (And Other Stories, 2012 UK and 2014 North American publication), An Open Secret (Pushkin Press) and The Adventure of the Busts of Eva Perón (And Other Stories, 2015). He adapted The Islands for a major theatrical production in 2011 and writes influential works of criticism. Gamerro works closely with the British translator Ian Barnett; the English-language versions are adaptations and collaborations based on the originals.

In addition, he has translated works of William Shakespeare, W. H. Auden, and Harold Bloom into Spanish.

== Bibliography ==
Fiction:

- Las Islas (1998) / The Islands translated by Ian Barnett (And Other Stories, 2012)
- El sueño del señor juez (2000)
- El secreto y las voces (2002) / An Open Secret, translated by Ian Barnett (Pushkin Press, 2012)
- La aventura de los bustos de Eva (2004) / The Adventure of the Busts of Eva Perón, translated by Ian Barnett (And Other Stories, 2015)
- El libro de los afectos raros (2005)
- Un yuppie en la columna del Che Guevara (2011)
- Cardenio (2016)
- La jaula de los onas (2021)

Drama:

- Las Islas, Teatro Alvear, Buenos Aires, directed by Alejandro Tantanian (2011)

Film:

- Tres de Corazones, with Rubén Mira, directed by Sergio Renán (2007)

Criticism:

- Harold Bloom y El Canon Literario (2003)
- El Nacimiento de La Literatura Argentina y Otros Ensayos (2006)
- Ulises. Claves de lectura (2008)
- Ficciones barrocas: una lectura de Borges, Bioy Casares, Silvina Ocampo, Cortázar, Onetti y Felisberto Hernández (2010)
- Facundo o Martín Fierro: los libros que inventaron la Argentina (2015)
