= Drama (2022 film) =

2022 Tamil language drama film

- Directed by: Aju Kizhumala
- Produced by: Antony Raj M
- Starring: Kishore; Charle; Vinoth Munna; Nagulan Vincent; Jai Bala; Kavya Bellu
- Cinematography: Bijipal
- Music by: Shinos
- Release date: 23 September 2022
- Country: India
- Language: Tamil

Drama is a 2022 Indian Tamil-language drama film directed by Aju Kizhumala and written by Antony Raj M. The film stars Kishore, Charle, Vinoth Munna, Nagulan Vincent, Jai Bala, and Kavya Bellu. The music was composed by Shinos with cinematography by Bijipal. The film released on 23 September 2022.

== Cast ==
- Kishore as DSP Arjun
- Charle as Moorthy
- Vinoth Munna as Thanigachalam
- Nagulan Vincent as Rajapandian
- Jai Bala as Udayashankar
- Kavya Bellu as Vaigaa
- Maria Prince as Divya
- Vijayalakshmi as Kayal
- Preethi Shah as Catherine
- Subhash as Ramakrishnan
- Thangavelu as Selvam
- Santhosh Kesavan as Joseph
- Sumesh as Senthil
- Sajith Thoppil as Bandh
- Rajadurai as Auto Driver
- Shan Kallettumkara as Sabha

== Production ==
Prior to release, the film garnered attention for being the "longest one-shot film in India". In late 2020, the entire film was shot in about 8 hours with 80 technicians on the set. Prior to the shoot, the cast members rehearsed for up to 180 days. Soon after its shoot, the makers marketed it as "the first movie in the Indian film industry to be entirely completed in a single shot", but later backtracked after the theatrical release of R. Parthiban's Iravin Nizhal (2022), another single shot film.

The film's director, Aju Kizhamala, revealed that he had rejected advances from OTT service providers in late 2020 to ensure the film had a theatrical release.

== Reception ==
The film was released on 23 September 2022 across Tamil Nadu. A critic from Maalai Malar gave the film a mixed review, noting that it "lacked excitement". Film critic Malini Mannath gave the film a positive review, writing "it’s appreciable that the director has managed to confine his story telling to less than two hours of viewing time. ‘Drama’ is at its best a promising piece of work from a new entrant to the Tamil screen".
