= Mahanubhavaru =

- Directed by: Sandeep Nagalikar Sindhanur
- Written by: Sandeep Nagalikar Sindhanur
- Produced by: Balachander
- Starring: Balachander; Gokul Raj; Anusha Rai; Priyanka
- Cinematography: Veeresh NTA
- Edited by: RD Ravi
- Music by: Satish Mourya
- Production company: Munnudi Creations
- Distributed by: Munnudi Creations
- Release date: 17 November 2017
- Country: India
- Language: Kannada

Mahanubhavaru (meaning: VIPs) is a 2017 Indian Kannada-language romantic film directed by Sandeep Nagalikar Sindhanur. The film starred Balachander, Gokul Raj, Anusha Rai, and Priyanka in lead roles. The music has been composed by Satish Mourya & Re-recording by Arjun Janya.Yogaraj Bhat has penned one song for the movie. Puneeth Rajkumar and Sri Murali has also sung one song.

== Plot ==
The story revolves around two differently-minded friends named Ajay and Sanjay. They each have different plans, goals and their own views of ethics. Ajay wants to plan his life and go along with it, while Sanjay is an easy-going person who enjoys his life the way it ends up being. Both meet with their love in their journey. The movie concludes with the one on the right path.

== Cast ==
- Balachander
- Gokul Raj
- Anusha Rai
- Priyanka
- Sadhu Kokila

== Soundtrack ==
The music is scored by Satish Mourya. The soundtrack was released on 8 November 2017, and featured 7 tracks. The lyrics were written by Yogaraj Bhat, Sandeep Nagalikar, Satish Mourya, Magadi Lokesh and Srinivas.

Track listing
No.	Title	Lyrics	Singer(s)	Length
1.	"Gadige Hornu Breaku"	Sandeep Nagalikar	Puneeth Rajkumar, Sri Murali	03:44
2.	"Barada Besigeyalli"	Nagadi Lokesh	Rajesh Krishnan	04:16
3.	"Kannalli Kandenu"	Srinivas	Magadi Lokesh, Anuradha Bhat	04:48
4.	"Preethi Hrudaya (Bit song)"	Satish Mourya	Magadi Lokesh	01:31
5.	"Baru Baglu"	Yogaraj Bhat	Vijay Prakash	04:29
6.	"Kallinatha E Hrudhayadalli"	Magadi Lokesh	Rajesh Krishnan	04:23
7.	"Pritiyannu Bit Kot Bittu (Bit song)"	Satish Mourya	Rajesh Krishnan	01:05
