= Siddhu =

Kannada movie

- DVD Cover
- Directed by: Mahesh Sukhadare
- Written by: B. A. Madhu (dialogue)
- Screenplay by: Mahesh Sukhadare
- Story by: B. A. Madhu
- Starring: Murali; Deepu
- Cinematography: Ramesh Babu
- Edited by: P. R. Sounder Rajan
- Music by: R. P. Patnaik
- Release date: 22 July 2005
- Country: India
- Language: Kannada

Siddhu is a 2005 Indian Kannada-language action drama film directed by Mahesh Sukhadhare and starring Murali and Deepu. The film is inspired by the German film Run Lola Run (1998) and was a box office failure.

== Cast ==
- Sriimurali as Siddhu
- Deepu as Anjali
- Akhilendra Mishra as Range Gowda
- H. G. Dattatreya as Siddu's teacher
- Tara as Sowmya
- Cudavalli Chandrashekar
- Avinash
- Sharan

== Production ==
Murali signed the film before completing his previous film Yashwanth (2003). S. P. Balasubrahmanyam and Prakash Raj were initially considered to act in the film.

Murali did all the stunts himself. The first schedule was shot in Bangalore. A month later, a chase sequence was also shot in Bangalore. Hindi actor Akhilendra Mishra stars in the film.

== Soundtrack ==
The music is composed by R. P. Patnaik.

Track listing
No.	Title	Lyrics	Singer(s)	Length
1.	"Nee Sheetala"	Kaviraj	Sonu Nigam, K. S. Chithra	4:20
2.	"Surya Thampu"	Kaviraj	Rajesh Krishnan, Shreya Ghoshal	5:11
3.	"Nachu Nachu"	Kaviraj	Shankar Mahadevan, K. S. Chithra	4:33
4.	"O My Love"	K. Mahesh Sukhadare	Madhu Balakrishnan	4:40
5.	"Katiko Katiko"	K. Mahesh Sukhadare	Sukhwinder Singh, Chaitra H. G.	5:25
6.	"Sisya Sisya"	Ram Narayan	R. P. Patnaik, Sonu Kakkar	4:12
Total length:				28:21

== Reception ==
R. G. Vijayasarathy of Rediff.com wrote that "For Murali fans, this is good stuff. For others, still very well presented fare". A critic from Viggy wrote that "In a nutshell, Siddu is a film that doesn't test your patience for sure and lives up to the expectations". S. N. Deepak of Deccan Herald wrote "Mahesh Sukhadhare, who earlier directed Sambhrama, Sainika and Shivarajkumar-starrer Sarvabhouma, has taken up a story which appeals to youth. But, it is the usual yarn in the second half".
