= Vakkalathu Narayanankutty =

- Directed by: T. K. Rajeev Kumar
- Screenplay by: T. K. Rajeev Kumar; Jayaprakash Kuloor; Dialogues: Jayaprakash Kuloor
- Story by: T. K. Rajeev Kumar
- Produced by: B. Rakesh
- Starring: Jayaram; Mukesh; Manya; Jagathy Sreekumar; Bobby Kottarakkara
- Cinematography: Ravi Varman
- Edited by: Sreekar Prasad
- Music by: Songs: Mohan Sithara; Score: Sharreth
- Distributed by: Khathilakam Release
- Release date: 9 February 2001
- Running time: 144 min
- Country: India
- Language: Malayalam

Vakkalathu Narayanankutty (transl. Narayanankutty on prosecution) is a 2001 Indian Malayalam-language legal comedy-drama film co-written and directed by T. K. Rajeev Kumar, starring Jayaram, Mukesh, Kalabhavan Mani, Manya and Jagathy Sreekumar. It was actor Bobby Kottarakkara's last film. The film had an average performance at the box office.

== Plot ==
Narayanankutty, who is aspiring to be a lawyer, finds himself working as a government office clerk. Undeterred by this unexpected turn, Narayanankutty becomes renowned as 'Vakkaalaththu Narayanankutty' for his unique approach to justice – filing Public-Interest Litigations against those who break the law. His commitment to justice becomes a double-edged sword, attracting the ire of certain individuals. The story takes a dark twist when he is framed in a rape case, facing serious consequences. Undeterred, Narayanankutty refuses to lose faith in the legal system and continues his fight against the wrongdoers.

== Cast ==
- Jayaram as Vakkalathu Narayanankutty
- Mukesh as Adv. Mathew Chandy Neruparambil, Narayanankutty's Friend
- Manya as Kukku Kurian, Narayanankutty's Love Interest
- Jagathy Sreekumar as Advocate Easwara Subramoni Iyer, Mathew's Senior Advocate
- K. B. Ganesh Kumar as Raghu, Narayanankutty's Friend and Auto Driver
- Kalabhavan Mani as S.I. 'Minnal' Chandran
- Rajan P. Dev as DGP Kurian Kulapurayil IPS, Kukku's Father
- Bobby Kottarakkara as Captain Bobby, Book Seller and Narayanankutty's Assistant
- Nandu as Secretariat Office Peon
- P. Balachandran as Padmanabhan, Narayanankutty's Father
- Roslin as Narayanankutty's Mother
- Shalu Menon as Niveditha, Narayanankutty's Sister
- Ponnamma Babu as Kochuthresia, Kukku's Mother
- Raghavan as Judge
- Professor Aliyar as Secretariat Office Staff
- P. Sreekumar as Ex-Minister Sasidhara Kurup
- Viji Thampi as Chief Minister Nambiar
- Poojappura Radhakrishnan as Secretariat Office Clerk
- Kuttyedathi Vilasini as Krishnammal
- Adv. Jayaprakash Kottarakara as Cameo Appearance
- Kalliyoor Sasi as Prof. Narayanan Potty

== Reception ==
A critic from Sify wrote, "Vakalath Narayanan Kutty is as stale as yesterday's sambar".
