= And Other Stories =

British book publisher

- Founded: 2009; 17 years ago
- Founder: Stefan Tobler
- Country of origin: United Kingdom
- Headquarters location: Sheffield, South Yorkshire
- Distribution: NBN International (Europe); Consortium Book Sales & Distribution (North America)
- Publication types: Books
- Official website: www.andotherstories.org

And Other Stories is an independent British book publisher set up in 2009, notable for being the first United Kingdom publisher of literary fiction to make direct, advance subscriptions a major part of its business model, as well as for its use of foreign language reading groups to choose the books that it publishes. The company originally operated from High Wycombe, Buckinghamshire, but is now based in Sheffield, South Yorkshire. In 2012, it was nominated for the Newcomer of the Year award by the Independent Publishers Guild (IPG), and has gone on to publish multiple award-winning books, most notably the 2025 International Booker Prize winner Heart Lamp and the 2026 winner, Taiwan Travelogue.

== History ==
And Other Stories was set up in 2009 by Stefan Tobler. Its first book, Down the Rabbit Hole by Juan Pablo Villalobos (translated by Rosalind Harvey), was chosen by the public to be one of the ten titles longlisted for the 2011 Guardian First Book Award. It went on to make the shortlist and was shortlisted for the Oxford-Weidenfeld Translation Prize.

Deborah Levy's Swimming Home was shortlisted for the Man Booker Prize 2012, as well as UK Author of the Year at the Specsavers National Book Awards 2012. and the Jewish Quarterly-Wingate Prize 2013.

And Other Stories was nominated for and subsequently won Publisher of the Year in the 2011 3:AM Magazine Awards.

Following Kamila Shamsie's 2015 call for publishers to address gender disparity in book prizes, And Other Stories was the only press to answer her by publishing only women throughout 2018. This included then unpublished work from cult writer Ann Quin, titled The Unmapped Country: Stories and Fragments. A resurgence of popularity for the obscure "writer from the front rank of Britain's literary avant-garde" continued with a reprinting of her complete catalogue by And Other Stories, including Berg (2019), Three (2020), and Tripticks (2022).

Award listings continued throughout and beyond the pandemic. Phenotypes by Paulo Scott was longlisted for the 2022 International Booker Prize, and it won And Other Stories the Jabuti Prize for best foreign publication of a Brazilian book in 2023. Also in 2023, And Other Stories published Eva Baltasar's Boulder, which was shortlisted for the International Booker Prize, while the publisher's first poetry collection, Pitch & Glint by Lutz Seiler, was the Poetry Book Society's Translation Choice in Autumn.

Several And Other Stories publications from 2024 were shortlisted for awards, including Praiseworthy by Alexis Wright. In Australia, it won the Stella Prize and the Miles Franklin Award, and in the UK the James Tait Black Prize.

In 2025, the company continued to publish poetry collections, and Heart Lamp by Banu Mushtaq marked a number of firsts with its International Booker Prize Win: it is the first short story collection to win, and the first Kannada-language work shortlisted. Translator Deepa Bhasthi is also the first winning translator from the Global Majority. The 2026 International Booker Prize winner was Taiwan Travelogue by Yáng Shuāng-zǐ, translated from Mandarin Chinese by Lin King, published in the UK by And Other Stories.

== List of books ==
- All the Lights by Clemens Meyer
- Down the Rabbit Hole by Juan Pablo Villalobos
- Swimming Home by Deborah Levy
- Open Door by Iosi Havilio
- Happiness is Possible by Oleg Zaionchkovsky
- The Islands by Carlos Gamerro
- Zbinden's Progress by Christoph Simon
- Lightning Rods by Helen DeWitt
- Black Vodka by Deborah Levy
- Captain of the Steppe by Oleg Pavlov
- All Dogs are Blue by Rodrigo de Souza Leão
- Quesadillas by Juan Pablo Villalobos
- Paradises by Iosi Havilio
- Double Negative by Ivan Vladislavić
- Heart Lamp by Banu Mushtaq – awarded the International Booker Prize 2025
- A Map of Tulsa by Benjamin Lytal
- Taiwan Travelogue by Yáng Shuāng-zǐ – awarded the International Booker Prize 2026
