= Kodagina Gowramma =

Indian Kannada writer (1912–1939)

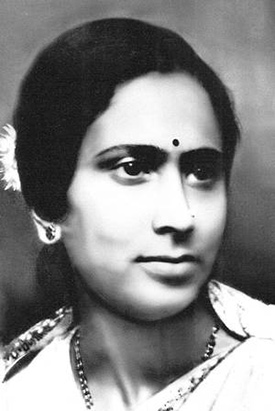
- Born: Gowramma; 1912; Madikeri, Coorg State, British India
- Died: 1939 (aged 26–27); Coorg State, British India
- Occupation: Author
- Writing career
- Pen name: Kodagina Gowramma
- Notable works: Manuvina Rani, Aparaadhi Yaaru
- Movement: Feminism

Gowramma (1912–1939), better known as Kodagina Gowramma, was an Indian writer who wrote in Kannada and lived in Kodagu. She was a feminist and supporter of the Indian Freedom Movement.

== Life ==
Gowramma was born in 1912 to N.S Ramayya and Nanjamma in Madikeri and married to B. T. Gopal Krishna of Somwarpet taluk in Kodagu, then known as Coorg, a province in British India. She invited Mahatma Gandhi to her family house, during his campaign in Coorg, and donated all her gold ornaments towards the Harijan (Dalit) Welfare Fund.

She drowned in a whirlpool, aged 27, on 13 April 1939.

== Works ==
Gowramma wrote in Kannada under the name 'Kodagina Gowramma'. Her stories, such as "Aparaadhi Yaaru" (Who is the criminal), "Vaaniya Samasye", "Aahuthi" and "Manuvina Raani", were modern and progressive. Her story "Manuvina Rani" made her famous. A volume of her best known stories, Gowramma Kathegalu, was issued from Madikeri. A volume of Gowramma's stories was published as Mareyalagada Kathegalu and prefaced by Kannada writer Vaidehi. Gowramma's short stories have been translated by Deepa Bhasthi into English in 2023, published by Yoda Press as "Fate's game and other stories".

Kannada critic and writer MS Asha Devi has said, "She was completely influenced by Gandhi and believed that it was possible for people to change society through love, sacrifice and non-violence. She was boldly experimental. She edited the first woman’s short story collection, called Rangavalli. [...] As for her own stories, DR Bendre described them best when he called them khatu-madura, something which would translate to 'bittersweet' in English. She was one of our most important writers, but then, she never got the credit she deserved."

== Influence ==
Decades later, her works inspired Triveni, a writer in Kannada. The writer Shanthi K Appanna has cited Gowramma as an inspiration. Poet D. R. Bendre composed a poem "Tangi Gouramma" about her and her death, published in 1958.

== Legacy ==
Family members have created the Kodagina Gowramma Endowment Award to support writers.
