= Heart Lamp: Selected Stories =

2025 International Booker Prize winning collection of short stories

- Author: Banu Mushtaq
- Translator: Deepa Bhasthi
- Language: Kannada
- Genre: Short stories
- Published: 10 September 2024 (UK); 18 February 2025 (India); 8 April 2025 (US)
- Publisher: And Other Stories (UK); Penguin Random House India (India); And Other Stories Publishing (US)
- Publication place: India
- Media type: Print
- Pages: 192
- ISBN: 9781916751163

Heart Lamp: Selected Stories (Kannada: ಎದೆಯ ಹಣತೆ, romanized: edeya haṇate) is a collection of short stories by Indian writer Banu Mushtaq, originally written in Kannada between 1990 and 2023 and translated into English by Deepa Bhasthi. Published by And Other Stories in the UK on 10 September 2024, the collection comprises 12 stories exploring the lives of Muslim women in southern India, focusing on themes of patriarchy, gender inequality, and resilience. The book won the International Booker Prize in 2025: the first Kannada-language work and the first collection of short stories to receive this award.

== Contents ==
Heart Lamp: Selected Stories consists of 12 short stories written by Banu Mushtaq over three decades, translated into English by Deepa Bhasthi. The stories focus on the experiences of Muslim women in southern India, addressing themes of gender inequality, faith, and societal pressures, often with dry humour and emotional depth.

Key stories include "Stone Slabs for Shaista Mahal" and "A Decision of the Heart", which explore gender roles and societal expectations. The title story reflects an incident in Mushtaq's own life when, struggling with marriage, motherhood, and domesticity, she doused herself in kerosene. In the story, the protagonist's children intervene, reminding her that she is loved and understood.

The collection is part of the Bandaya Sahitya movement, a Kannada literary tradition critiquing caste, class, and religious oppression. The translation retains Kannada, Urdu, and Arabic words to preserve cultural authenticity.

The compilation comprises the following stories:

- "Stone Slabs for Shaista Mahal"
- "Fire Rain"
- "Black Cobras"
- "A Decision of the Heart"
- "Red Lungi"
- "Heart Lamp"
- "High-Heeled Shoe"
- "Soft Whispers"
- "A Taste of Heaven"
- "The Shroud"
- "The Arabic Teacher and Gobi Manchuri"
- "Be a Woman Once, Oh Lord"

== Plot Summary ==
=== "Stone Slabs for Shaista Mahal" ===
The story is narrated by Zeenat, a young, educated Muslim woman who moves with her husband, Mujahid, from a crowded city to government quarters near the Krishna Raja Sagara (KRS) dam after his job transfer. Zeenat enjoys the peaceful surroundings and the garden at their new home, although she often feels lonely because Mujahid is busy with his work. Their life changes when Mujahid's colleague, Iftikhar Ahmed, invites them to his house in Belagola. At Iftikhar's home, Zeenat meets his wife, Shaista, and their six children, including their eldest daughter, Asifa.

Shaista appears cheerful and affectionate, while Iftikhar frequently declares his deep love for her. He proudly shows Zeenat and Mujahid the garden he created for Shaista and claims that, if he were an emperor, he would build a palace called 'Shaista Mahal' for her, greater than the Taj Mahal. However, Zeenat also observes tensions within the family, particularly about Asifa's future. Shaista wishes her daughter to continue her education, but Iftikhar believes that girls do not need much education and plans to marry her off early.

Zeenat gradually becomes close to Shaista and often visits her house, spending time with the children. Shaista expresses concern about her repeated pregnancies and discusses the possibility of undergoing a sterilisation operation after the birth of her next child. Shortly afterwards, Shaista gives birth to a baby boy. Although she is weak after delivery, she soon resumes normal activities. Soon after these events, Zeenat receives news that her own mother is seriously ill. She and Mujahid travel to their village, where her mother dies after a heart attack. They remain there for a period of mourning before returning to their home near KRS.

When Zeenat later visits Shaista's house with gifts for the newborn child, she finds the household strangely quiet and neglected. Inside the house, she encounters a very young woman dressed like a newlywed bride. Iftikhar then reveals that Shaista has died unexpectedly, soon after childbirth. He has already married the young woman, explaining that he needed someone to look after the children. Zeenat is shocked by how quickly Iftikhar has replaced Shaista, especially after his earlier declarations of eternal love for her. As she leaves the house, she sees Asifa caring for her younger siblings and holding the infant. The story ends with the suggestion that, despite her youth, Asifa has taken on the responsibilities of a mother, echoing Shaista's earlier remark that her daughter was 'like her mother.'

=== "Fire Rain" ===
The story centres on Usman Saheb, the influential mutawalli (caretaker and leader) of a mosque committee in a small town. One morning, after the call to prayer, he wakes up irritated and restless. His anger arises from a dispute the previous night with his youngest sister, Jameela, who had demanded her rightful share of their late father's property according to Islamic law. Usman refuses to consider the request seriously, resenting the idea of dividing the family wealth. Although his wife, Arifa, quietly supports Jameela's claim and reminds him that daughters have legal inheritance rights, he dismisses her advice.

The following morning, several people gathered at Usman's house seeking help. Among them is his widowed sister Sakeena, who beseeches him to help her son obtain a minor job. Others approach him with personal problems, such as medical expenses or wedding costs. Despite presenting himself as a community leader who assists the poor, Usman internally calculates his responses and often acts out of pride and self-interest.

During this time, his associate Dawood brings disturbing news: the body of Nisar, a Muslim man who had been missing, was mistakenly buried in a Hindu cemetery by the police. The incident quickly becomes a matter of religious outrage within the local Muslim community. Usman sees an opportunity to increase his prestige and influence. He mobilises the community, meets government officials, and leads a campaign demanding that the body be exhumed and given proper Islamic burial rites.

After many efforts, permission was granted. Nisar's decomposed body is exhumed and reburied with ceremony in the Muslim cemetery, with Usman at the head of the funeral procession. However, during the procession, a drunken man appears in the street, and several people recognise him as Nisar himself. This shocking moment reveals that the corpse being buried may not actually be Nisar's body. Despite realising the mistake, no one in the procession speaks out, and the burial continues in silence.

When Usman returns home after the funeral, exhausted and shaken, he learns that his young son, Ansar, has been seriously ill for many days with meningitis and has been taken to the hospital by Arifa. The news overwhelms him. As he sits in distress, the voices of those who had sought justice or help from him echo in his mind—his sister demanding her rightful share, the widow asking for assistance, and the warnings about the suffering caused when the rights of others are denied. Usman is confronting the consequences of his arrogance and moral blindness.

=== "Black Cobras" ===
A poor Muslim woman, Aashraf, whose husband, Yakub, abandons her and their three daughters because she has not given birth to a son, faces injustice. Yakub later marries another woman and refuses to support Aashraf or their children. Aashraf struggles to survive, working as a domestic labourer for Zulekha Begum, and trying desperately to obtain money for the treatment of her sick infant daughter, Munni. Zulekha Begum, an educated woman, encourages Aashraf to submit petitions to the local mosque committee asking them to intervene and force Yakub to provide financial support. According to Islamic law, a man who marries more than one wife must treat all wives equally and fulfil his responsibilities toward them. However, the mosque’s mutawalli, Abdul Khader Saheb, ignores her petitions and repeatedly delays taking action. He misuses religious authority to justify Yakub's behaviour instead of ensuring justice.

One night, Aashraf waits in the mosque compound with her three children in the cold rain, hoping that the mosque authorities will finally hear her complaint. While she waits, her sick child Munni becomes weaker. Meanwhile, the mutawalli spends the evening eating and enjoying himself with Yakub instead of addressing the issue. When they eventually arrive at the mosque, Yakub insults Aashraf and violently kicks her during the confrontation. As she falls, Munni slips from her arms and later dies shortly.

The tragedy shocks the community, particularly the women who witness the incident. Munni's death exposes the cruelty, negligence, and hypocrisy of the male authorities who failed to protect Aashraf's rights. The women of the neighbourhood openly condemn the mutawalli and Yakub through sarcasm, curses, and symbolic insults. Their reactions represent a form of moral judgement against the injustice that led to the child’s death. The mutawalli feels deep guilt and humiliation as the community's women express their anger. At the same time, his own wife Amina decides to leave home to undergo a sterilisation operation, rejecting the control he has exercised over her body and life.

=== "A Decision of the Heart" ===
Yusuf, a diligent fruit vendor who must choose between two emotional allegiances: his widowed mother, Mehaboob Bi and his wife, Akhila. His house is physically divided so that his wife and mother live separately. Although Yusuf has a deep love for both women, Akhila is always envious of the care he provides for his mother. Frequent arguments, taunts, and public outbursts result from this jealousy.

Mehaboob Bi is frequently accused by Akhila of acting like a rival wife and of stealing her husband's affection. Yusuf gets upset when Akhila insults his mother, whom he respects and feels obligated to for raising him with such sacrifice following the death of his father. Over time, their disputes worsen. Akhila challenges Yusuf during a furious argument, making fun of him when he promises to honour his mother and even arrange for her to be remarried again. Yusuf accepts the challenge out of rage and chooses to set Mehaboob Bi up for marriage.

Initially, Yusuf's choice is partially motivated by retaliation against his wife and an effort to ease the ongoing conflict between the two women. He starts looking diligently for his mother's ideal husband. He rejects a number of proposals because he wants a respectable person who will take good care of her. He eventually locates Abdul Ghaffar, a respectable widower, and meticulously arranges the wedding, including making jewellery and other details.

Akhila feels scared and ashamed when she realises that the marriage is actually going to take place. She gathers neighbours and community members to step in after realising that her actions are to blame. She acknowledges her errors in front of them and pledges to treat Mehaboob Bi with decency and consideration going forward.

This abrupt change has deeply wounded and perplexed Yusuf. Because of his wife's pressure, he is concerned that his mother might believe he set up the marriage. Mehaboob Bi, however, unexpectedly accepts the circumstance with dignity. She invites everyone to the wedding and states that there is nothing wrong with her second marriage. Her decision is driven by her desire to calm her son's troubled life rather than by personal desire. Yusuf continues the wedding arrangements while Akhila realises the seriousness of her actions and breaks down in regret.

=== "Red Lungi" ===
When many relatives' kids congregate at Razia's house over the summer break, she feels overburdened. She gets a lot of headaches and irritation from the eighteen kids' constant fighting, games, and noise. Razia, unable to put up with the mayhem, chooses to limit the kids' activities by getting the family's eligible boys circumcised (khatna), which will force them to recuperate.

Razia chooses six boys for the procedure after determining the children's ages. The preparations start right away. The household gets busy making plans as red cloth is bought and sewn into lungis for the boys. Razia also chooses to include the town's impoverished families in the event's planning. Announcements are made in local mosques inviting people to bring their sons for a mass circumcision ceremony organised by her husband, Latif Ahmad.

On the appointed Friday, many poor families arrive with their children. The circumcisions are performed in a madrasa by Ibrahim, an experienced traditional barber. The procedure is conducted in a crowded and tense atmosphere, with boys being held down and encouraged to shout religious words while the operation is performed without modern medical methods. Among the boys is Arif, Amina's son, the cook, who undergoes the painful procedure but later receives a small bag of food from Latif Ahmad as a reward.

During the event, several scenes reveal the poverty of the people who attend. One woman attempts to bring her son for the operation in hopes of receiving the distributed food, but it is discovered that the boy has already been circumcised, and she is mocked and sent away. Another extremely poor mother brings her infant hoping for help; Latif Ahmad quietly gives her some money, but he later feels uneasy about the harsh treatment of the earlier woman.

Meanwhile, the boys from Latif Ahmad’s own family are circumcised separately by a surgeon in a hospital under anaesthesia. They receive careful treatment, medicines, and nutritious food during recovery. Despite these comforts, one of the boys, Samad, Razia’s son, suffers complications and must be hospitalised. In contrast, Arif, who underwent the traditional procedure without medical care, recovers quickly. Within a few days, he is already active and climbing trees in Razia’s yard.

Razia is surprised to see that his wound has healed without infection, even though he had received only ash on the wound and no medicines. During a later celebration held for the circumcised boys, Razia sees Arif again. Although he appears healthy, his clothes are torn and worn out. Observing the contrast between the wealth of her family and the poverty of the boy, Razia feels sympathy. She gives him one of her son’s new clothes. Arif accepts it with quiet gratitude and leaves, while Razia reflects on the differences between the lives of the rich and the poor.

=== "Heart Lamp" ===
Mehrun, a married woman, returns to her parental home with her infant daughter in distress after discovering that her husband, Inayat, has been involved with another woman. Her family members react with shock and discomfort rather than warmth. Her parents and brothers question her decision to come without informing them and express concern about family honour. Mehrun explains that her husband has abandoned her and is living with a nurse.

She reminds her family that she had earlier resisted the marriage and wished to continue her education, but her pleas had been ignored. Now, burdened with several children and facing humiliation from her husband, she refuses to return to him. However, her family refuses to support her. They advise her to tolerate the situation and warn that her actions could damage the family's reputation and affect the marriage prospects of her sisters and daughters.

Despite Mehrun's desperation, her brothers insist on sending her back to her husband's house. They take her by taxi to Chikmagalur, where she lives with her children. Upon arriving, Mehrun’s eldest daughter, Salma, welcomes her with relief, hoping that her uncles will confront her father. Instead, the men behave politely with Inayat and avoid discussing the problem openly.

After a meal, Mehrun's brothers advise her privately to manage the situation wisely and maintain the household, then leave. Inayat later returns home and dismisses Mehrun's complaints, threatening to divorce her if she continues to involve her family. He treats the situation casually, while Mehrun remains silent and emotionally shattered. After her brothers depart and her husband leaves again, the household falls into a quiet gloom. Salma senses her mother's suffering and keeps a watchful eye on her.

That night, overwhelmed by humiliation, loneliness, and the sense that she has no support from either her husband or her family, Mehrun decides to end her life by pouring kerosene over herself outside the house and prepares to light a match. At that moment, Salma wakes up, realises what her mother intends to do, and rushes outside with the crying baby. She embraces her mother and pleads with her not to abandon her children. Moved by her daughter's desperate appeal and physical embrace, Mehrun regains control of herself. The matchbox falls from her hand, and she holds her children close. She breaks down in tears, realising that although she has lost her husband's love and the support of her family, her children still need her. Mehrun abandons her plan and asks her daughter for forgiveness, and resolves to continue living for her children.

=== "High-Heeled Shoe" ===
Nayaz Khan, a poor government office peon who becomes strangely obsessed with a pair of elegant high-heeled shoes worn by his wealthy sister-in-law, Naseema, who returns from Saudi Arabia during a vacation. To Nayaz, the objects she brings from abroad symbolise wealth, luxury, and social status. Among them, the high-heeled shoes captivate him the most. He wishes his own wife, Arifa, could wear such shoes and appear graceful and sophisticated like Naseema.

Nayaz's fascination with the shoes gradually turns into an unhealthy obsession. When Naseema leaves for Saudi Arabia, she carefully packs the shoes so that Nayaz cannot take them. For years, the image of those shoes continues to haunt him. Meanwhile, Nayaz struggles with financial problems and attempts to improve his family's status. He renovates his ancestral house, cuts down an old mango tree, and builds shops using borrowed money, hoping his elder brother Mehaboob Khan, who works abroad, will appreciate the improvements and help him financially.

However, tensions develop between the brothers. Mehaboob is deeply hurt that Nayaz destroyed the mango tree without consulting him, because it represented their childhood memories and family history. Naseema further worsens the misunderstanding by manipulating the situation and increasing the emotional distance between the brothers. During this period, Arifa, Nayaz’s wife, suffers silently. She is pregnant, physically weak, and burdened with household work and family conflict.

Eventually, Mehaboob notices her poor health and insists on taking her to a doctor. After the medical visit, the family goes shopping. There, Nayaz unexpectedly sees a pair of high-heeled shoes identical to the ones that once fascinated him. Overwhelmed by excitement, he buys them immediately and forces Arifa to wear them, even though they do not fit her feet.

Arifa struggles painfully to walk in the shoes. Her feet are too wide, the heels are uncomfortable, and she fears falling and harming the baby in her womb. While walking alone outside, she experiences intense physical strain and emotional distress. In a moment of near collapse, she becomes deeply aware of the unborn child within her. Imagining the child’s voice pleading for space and relief, she realises that the pressure caused by the shoes is endangering her baby.

This realisation awakens a powerful maternal instinct. Gathering all her strength, Arifa forces her weight against the shoes until the thin high heels finally break apart. Freed from them, she stands firmly on the ground again, symbolising her rejection of the destructive pressure of material desires and social imitation.

=== "Soft Whispers" ===
Narrated by a woman who receives a late-night phone call from her mother, who informs her that Abid, a man from her ancestral village Malenahalli, has arrived to invite her to attend the Urs festival at the dargah. According to family tradition, someone from their family must participate in the sandalwood ritual.

The call brings back vivid memories of the narrator’s childhood visits to the village. She recalls her affectionate grandmother, Ajji, who was deeply respected in the village for her wisdom and spiritual outlook. During one such visit for the Urs festival, the narrator celebrates her eighth birthday. Her mother anxiously worries that the child does not have new clothes, while her grandmother calmly promises to arrange a dress. Ajji takes the narrator to a tailor named Jaffar Baba and asks him to stitch a frock. Their conversation reflects spiritual ideas about purity of heart and the nature of human life.

The narrator also remembers playful moments with the village children. One afternoon, a group of boys led by the teenage Abid set traps to catch sparrows. After capturing one, Abid cuts open the bird to show the children the eggs inside it. The narrator receives the eggs but accidentally crushes them during a struggle with the other children, leaving her distressed. Later, while playing near the village pond, Abid suddenly lifts her and kisses her on the cheek in front of the other children. The incident embarrasses and frightens her, and she cries until her grandmother comforts and protects her. Ajji then distracts her by digging groundnuts from the soil, turning the painful day into a memorable experience. The narrator soon falls ill with fever, and her family leaves the village shortly afterwards. Many years pass, but the memory of that birthday remains vivid.

In the present, Abid arrives at the narrator’s house as a grown man. He is now the caretaker of the Shahmir Ali Dargah and respectfully invites her to attend the upcoming Urs festival. Addressing her formally and avoiding eye contact, he behaves with great restraint and reverence. Observing him, the narrator wonders whether the mischievous boy she once knew still exists within this devout man, but his quiet manner leaves the question unanswered.

=== "A Taste of Heaven" ===
In Saadat's household, an Urdu teacher, he struggles to understand the sudden changes in his wife, Shameem Banu's behaviour. She often gets angry over minor issues and quarrels with the children. Saadat convinces himself that her behaviour is due to menopause and silently tolerates her outbursts. The couple live with their three children: Azeem, Aseema, and Sana, and with an elderly relative known as Bi Dadi, Saadat's widowed aunt. She has spent her entire life serving the family after losing her husband soon after marriage. She quietly performs household chores and remains devoted to prayer. Over the years, she becomes deeply attached to an old prayer rug (ja-namaz) that holds memories of her brief married life.

One day, Azeem unknowingly uses Bi Dadi's prayer mat to wipe grease from his motorcycle. When Bi Dadi discovers this, she becomes extremely distressed. The incident reminds her of her past and causes intense grief. Although Shameem Banu tries to replace the mat with a new one, Bi Dadi refuses it and begins to cry constantly. She gradually stops eating regularly, stops praying, and withdraws from the family. The situation creates tension in the household. Saadat blames Shameem for hurting Bi Dadi's feelings, while Shameem becomes increasingly irritated with the old woman's constant crying. In a moment of anger, she sends Bi Dadi away to live with Saadat's younger brother, Arif. However, the children continue to visit her, and after some time, Azeem brings her back home.

Bi Dadi's behaviour becomes increasingly confused and childlike. One day, the children gather secretly in a room and give her a glass of a fizzy soft drink. Sana jokingly tells Bi Dadi that the drink is aab-e-kausar, the sacred water believed to exist in heaven. She also pretends to be a heavenly attendant and throws jasmine flowers near Bi Dadi, making her believe that she has reached heaven and that her long-dead husband is nearby. Bi Dadi accepts the illusion completely. Believing she is living in heaven, she becomes calm and content.

She spends her days happily imagining the presence of her husband and occasionally asking for the heavenly drink. To keep her peaceful, Azeem secretly continues to provide the drink, sometimes borrowing money to buy it. Eventually, his uncle Arif helps him supply it regularly. The family gradually adjusts to the strange situation. Bi Dadi lives in her imagined heavenly world, free from sorrow and anger. Although the adults believe that she has lost her sanity, her presence no longer causes conflict in the house. The story ends with Bi Dadi continuing to live peacefully in her imagined heaven, while the rest of the family quietly maintains the illusion that keeps her happy.

=== "The Shroud" ===
One morning, Shaziya, a wealthy woman, wakes up late and hears that Yaseen Bua, her former elderly, poor servant, has died. Bua's son Altaf comes to Shaziya's house to ask for the kaffan (shroud) that Shaziya had promised to bring from Mecca during her Hajj pilgrimage. Hearing this news, Shaziya becomes shocked and distressed because she remembers that she never fulfilled that promise.

The story then recalls the earlier incident when Shaziya and her husband, Subhan, were preparing to leave for Hajj. During a farewell gathering at their house, Yaseen Bua came uninvited but helped with household work throughout the day. Late at night, she met Shaziya and gave her the money she had saved with great difficulty, requesting that Shaziya bring her a kaffan from Mecca soaked in Zamzam water. Bua believed that being buried in such a shroud would help her attain spiritual merit in the afterlife. Shaziya casually agreed to the request.

However, during the pilgrimage, Shaziya became busy with religious activities and shopping. Although she briefly remembered the promise, she eventually forgot about it. After returning home, she distributed many gifts and items brought from Mecca, but did not bring the kaffan for Bua.

When Bua later visited Shaziya and asked for the shroud, Shaziya became irritated and insulted her. She refused to fulfil the promise and angrily tried to return the money. Hurt and humiliated, Bua left the house and never returned. Now, after Bua’s death, Shaziya realises the seriousness of her mistake. She becomes overwhelmed with guilt and desperately tries to find a Zamzam-soaked kaffan from her relatives and friends, but no one has one. She fears that Bua's last wish has remained unfulfilled because of her carelessness.

Eventually, Shaziya’s son, Farman, arranges an ordinary kaffan and completes the burial rituals. Later, he takes Shaziya to Bua's house to see her for the last time. Observing Shaziya's intense grief, the people present assume she is mourning the death of a devoted servant. In reality, Shaziya is grieving because she knows she has failed a poor woman's final wish and feels morally responsible for it.

=== "The Arabic Teacher and Gobi Manchuri" ===
The story is narrated by a lawyer who recalls an unusual incident from her past involving the Arabic teacher who once taught her daughters. As a working mother, she carries the main responsibility of raising her children and ensuring that they receive proper religious education. With the help of her younger brother, Imaad, she appoints a young Arabic teacher from Uttar Pradesh to teach her daughters Qira'at and Arabic language at home every evening.

The teacher, a hafiz who has memorised the Qur'an, appears shy and strictly observes religious modesty. He avoids direct conversation with women and mostly speaks to the narrator's husband and brother. Over time, the daughters make noticeable progress in their lessons, which makes the narrator satisfied with the teacher's work.

However, one afternoon, the narrator unexpectedly returns home early and finds a strange scene in the kitchen. Her daughters and the Arabic teacher are secretly attempting to cook gobi manchuri. Startled and frightened, the teacher immediately runs away. The daughters later explain that the teacher was extremely fond of gobi manchuri but could not afford to buy it often. Believing that it could easily be prepared in their house, he had persuaded the girls to help him cook it. Relieved that nothing improper had occurred, the narrator decides not to pursue the matter further, and the teacher stops coming to the house afterwards.

Some time later, the narrator begins hearing news about him again. The teacher faces difficulties finding a bride because of his unusual behaviour. In one marriage proposal, he even stops the prospective bride on the road to ask whether she knows how to cook gobi manchuri, which causes confusion and suspicion among her relatives. Eventually, the teacher gets married. However, six months later, a young woman and her brother come to the narrator's office seeking legal help. The woman's husband, who turns out to be the same Arabic teacher, has been beating her frequently. According to her brother, the quarrels often begin when the teacher demands gobi manchuri, but becomes angry when the food prepared by his wife does not satisfy him.

The narrator feels troubled by the situation and reflects on how the teacher's strange obsession has caused suffering in his marriage. Instead of immediately filing a criminal case, she considers another approach. She searches for a proper recipe for gobi manchuri and contacts her brother, hoping that solving the simple misunderstanding about the dish might help prevent further conflict and protect the young woman's life and marriage.

=== "Be a Woman Once, Oh Lord!" ===
The story is written as a long, prayer-like monologue in which an unnamed woman addresses God and narrates the suffering she has experienced throughout her life. She recalls her childhood, when she lived a sheltered and obedient life under the strict expectations placed on girls. She rarely stepped outside the house and was taught by her mother to be modest, silent, and submissive to her future husband. Eventually, she is married and sent away from her parental home. Although she feels deep pain at leaving her mother, she is expected to accept her new life without complaint.

After marriage, the narrator's identity is reduced to that of 'his wife.' Her husband treats her as his possession and expects complete obedience. Soon after the wedding, he demands that she bring a large amount of money from her parents as dowry. When she cannot bring the full amount, he insults and humiliates her. She briefly returns to her mother's home, but eventually goes back to her husband because she feels bound by social expectations.

Her husband later forbade her from maintaining contact with her parents. Her mother attempts to visit and even tries to bring money to satisfy the husband's demands, but dies in an accident before reaching the house. The narrator is not allowed to see her mother's body or attend the funeral, which deepens her sense of isolation and grief.

Despite the emotional abuse, the narrator continues living with her husband and gives birth to two children, first a daughter and later a son. She silently endures repeated pregnancies, physical exhaustion, and her husband’s indifference to her suffering. Society advises her to remain obedient and accept her husband's authority, leaving her with little support.

Later, the narrator becomes seriously ill and requires surgery for a tumour. During her recovery, her husband demands that she give him the gold chain her mother had made for her wedding. He reveals that he intends to marry another woman and wants to give the chain to his new bride. The narrator refuses, but she has no power to stop him.

After leaving the hospital, she returns home with her children only to find the house locked. She waits outside helplessly until night. Eventually, her husband arrives with his new bride and enters the house with a group of people celebrating the marriage, ignoring the narrator and her children. The story ends with the narrator's despair turning into a direct appeal to God. Reflecting on the injustice and suffering women endure, she asks God to experience life as a woman at least once, so that he may understand the pain, helplessness, and inequality faced by women in society.

== Development and publication ==
The stories in Heart Lamp: Selected Stories were selected by translator Deepa Bhasthi from Banu Mushtaq's six Kannada short story collections, written between 1990 and 2023. Bhasthi translated the collection to introduce Mushtaq's work to an international audience. The project was built on the success of Mushtaq's earlier translated collection, Haseena and Other Stories, which won the English PEN Translates Award in 2024. Heart Lamp was published by And Other Stories in the UK on 10 September 2024.

== Critical reception ==
Heart Lamp: Selected Stories was widely praised. The Hindu called it a "serious read with a sprinkle of humour", highlighting its focus on Muslim women's lives and the translation's retention of regional linguistic elements. Mint described it as a "textured exploration" of gender dynamics. The Week noted its blend of humor and serious themes, deeming it a "worthy Booker contender". The Times Literary Supplement commended its "emotional depth and cultural specificity". Scroll.in praised its "anger-driven narratives" and critique of patriarchy. The Indian Express lauded its depiction of the "contradictions and textures" of Muslim life. The Guardian highlighted the translation's "radical" approach in retaining regional words. Some reviewers noted that untranslated words could challenge non-regional readers but enriched authenticity.

The book was awarded the International Booker Prize in 2025, at London's Tate Modern.

== Awards ==
- International Booker Prize (2025) – A prize of £50,000 shared between author and translator
