= Shambu (2005 film) =

- Official poster
- Directed by: Dwarki
- Written by: Dwarki
- Starring: Murali; Manya
- Cinematography: S Krishna
- Edited by: Nagendra Urs
- Music by: Ramesh Krishna
- Production company: Nithin Films
- Release date: 19 October 2005
- Country: India
- Language: Kannada

Shambu is a 2005 Indian Kannada-language action drama film directed by Dwarki and starring Murali and Manya. The film was a box office failure.

== Cast ==
- Murali as Shambu
- Manya as Sahana
- Avinash
- Rangayana Raghu
- Honnavalli Krishna
- Sanketh Kashi
- Bullet Prakash
- Mandeep Roy
- Michael Madhu
- Rekha Das
- Chitra Shenoy
- Kishan Shrikanth

== Soundtrack ==
The songs were composed by Ramesh Krishna.

Track listing
No.	Title	Singer(s)	Length
1.	"Yenu Yenu"	Karthik	4:16
2.	"Hengidda Hengada"	Gururaj Hoskote, B. Jayashree	4:40
3.	"Dheemthananaa"	Hariharan	5:00
4.	"Boss Boss"	Tippu	4:59
5.	"Radhe Radhe"	Rajesh Krishnan, K. S. Chitra	4:06
Total length:			23:01

== Reception ==
Film critic R. G. Vijayasarathy of IANS wrote that "Shambhu comes out as a bad film from reel one and ends up as a very poor presentation that has been released in the Kannada film industry these days". A critic from Rediff.com wrote that "Eventually, Shambhu is not for those who want to look at the brighter side of Kannada cinema. It may not even please Murali's most ardent fans". S. N. Deepak of Deccan Herald wrote "The director has pulled a wafer thin story to a 145-minute long film with some twists. The first half is usual and the story picks up tempo only in the post-interval part. The action scenes, songs and fights cater to galleries. The comedy track does not relate to the story. Dialogues are punchy at some points".
