= Sriimurali =

Indian actor

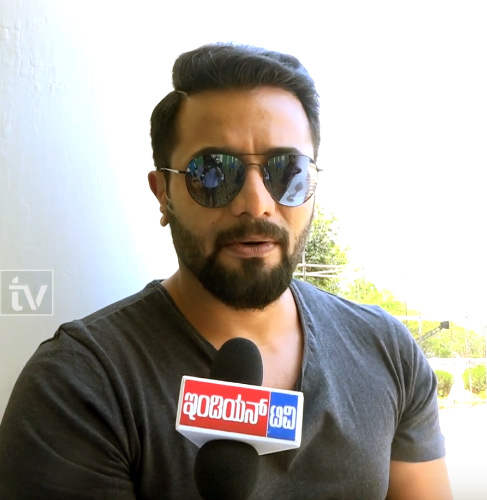
- Murali during press conference of Ugramm in 2014.
- Born: Sri Murali Gowda; 17 December 1981 (age 44); Bangalore, Karnataka, India
- Other names: Murali; Murali Dev (2005–2006)
- Occupation: Actor
- Years active: 2003–present
- Spouse: Vidya (m. 2008)
- Children: 2
- Father: S. A. Chinne Gowda
- Relatives: See Rajkumar family

Sri Murali Gowda (born 17 December 1981), known as Sriimurali and sometimes Murali, is an Indian actor who works predominantly in Kannada cinema. After making his lead debut in 2003 in Chandra Chakori, he appeared in Kanti as the eponymous lead, a performance that won him the Karnataka State Film Award for Best Actor in 2004.

Murali's performance in the 2014 film Ugramm received unanimous praise and emerged as a major success. For his performance in Bagheera (2024), he won the Filmfare Best Actor award.

== Early and personal life ==
Sriimurali was born on 17 December 1981 in Bangalore, Karnataka, in a family of film people. His father S. A. Chinne Gowda is a film producer and brother Vijay Raghavendra, an actor. Actor Rajkumar was his uncle and actors Shiva Rajkumar and Puneeth Rajkumar his cousins. He married his Telugu girlfriend, Vidya from Andhra, on 11 May 2008. They have a son - Agastya and a daughter - Atheeva together, who are born in 2009 and 2014 respectively. Vidya is the sister of Prashanth Neel, a director in Kannada cinema, and cousin of Aadarsh Balakrishna, an actor in Telugu cinema.

== Career ==
Sriimurali made his lead debut in films in 2003 with a romance film, Chandra Chakori. The film performed well and his performance received praise. In Kanti set in the backdrop of the Karnataka–Maharashtra border dispute, he played the eponymous lead of a college student who, on falling in love with a Marathi girl, gets embroiled politically. His performance won him the Karnataka State Film Award for Best Actor.

Sriimurali then appeared in films such as Yashwanth, Siddhu, Shambu and Preethigaagi, which did not perform well at the box office. In 2008, he appeared in Minchina Ota, produced by his father, also starring brother Vijay Raghavendra. He also takes care of the production responsibilities of his family banner Sowbhagya Pictures, under which several films produced by his father were made such as Sevanthi Sevanthi and Ganesha Matthe Banda. After hits Chandra Chakori, and Kanti, Sri Murali could not keep up the expectations of the audiences and all of his consecutive films were flops.

Prashanth Neel (Murali's brother in law) came up with an action drama story in 2008, exclusively for taking off Sri Murali's career again on a high note. The movie was initially named Nandhe and later changed to Ugramm. It took nearly 4–5 years for completion of the project, which marked Neel's directorial debut. The film was released in 2014. In the film, Sri Murali played the role of Agastya, a mechanic, who protects Nithya (played by Haripriya) from being caught alive by goons, and takes on the mafia. The film emerged as a critical and commercial success with his performance receiving acclaim. A. Sharadhaa of The Indian Express wrote: "This is definitely a 'comeback' film for Murali, a carefully thought-out project for him by the director. Murali is smarter than he looks and tougher than people expected him to be." He received his first nominations for Best Actor in Filmfare Awards South and SIIMA Awards. Following the massive success of the film, it was reported that he was flooded with offers for film totaling to 67, all of which he rejected.

== Filmography ==
- Note: He was credited as Murali from 2003 to 2007. He was credited as Sriimurali from 2008 onwards.

Key
†	Denotes films that have not yet been released

Year	Film	Role	Notes	Ref.
1993	Chinnari Mutha	Blue shirt boy	child actor; uncredited appearance in the song "Mannalli Biddonu"	
2003	Chandra Chakori	Puttaraju		
2004	Kanti	Srikantha "Kanti"		
2005	Yashwanth	Yeshwanth	credited as Murali Dev	
2005	Siddhu	Siddharth "Siddhu"		
2005	Shambu	Shambu		
2006	Gopi	Gopi	credited as Murali Dev	
2007	Preethigaagi	Sanjay		
2008	Minchina Ota	Bhadra		
2009	Shivamani	Shivamani		
2009	Yagna	Yagna		
2010	Sihigaali	Dharani		
2010	Sri Harikathe	Hari		
2011	Hare Rama Hare Krishna	Rama / Krishna		
2012	Sri Kshetra Adichunchanagiri	Sri Balagandhranatha Swami		
2013	Loosegalu	Kabira		
2013	Bhajarangi	Himself	Special appearance in song "Bossu Nam Bossu"	
2014	Ugramm	Agastya		
2014	Adyaksha	Himself	Special appearance in song "Phonu Illa"	
2015	Murari	Murari		
2015	Rathavara	Rathavara	Also playback singer for song "Hudugi Kannu"	
2017	Raj Vishnu	Murali	Special appearance	
2017	Mufti	Gana		
2018	Iruvudellava Bittu	Narrator	Voice role	
2019	Bharaate	Jagan Mohan & Jaya Ratnakara	Dual role; also presenter	
2021	Madhagaja	Surya		
2024	Bagheera	DSP Vedanth Prabhakar / Bagheera		
2026	Ugrayudham †	TBA		
2026	Paraak †	TBA		

== Discography ==
Year	Film	Song	Co-singer	Composer	Notes
2016	Zoom	"Hey Diwana"	Radhika Pandit	S. Thaman	
2016	Dombarata				Tulu film
2017	Mahanubhavaru	"Gadige Hornu Breaku"	Puneeth Rajkumar	Satish Mourya	

== Awards ==
Film	Award	Category	Result	Ref.
Kanti	2004–05 Karnataka State Film Awards	Best Actor	Won	
Ugramm	62nd Filmfare Awards South	Best Actor	Nominated	
Ugramm	4th SIIMA Awards	Best Actor	Nominated	
Mufti	7th SIIMA Awards	Best Actor	Nominated	
Mufti	7th SIIMA Awards	Critics Choice - Best Actor	Won	
Bharaate	9th SIIMA Awards	Best Actor	Nominated	
Bagheera	13th SIIMA Awards	Best Actor	Nominated	
Bagheera	70th Filmfare Awards South	Best Actor	Won	
