= Manya (actress) =

Indian actress (born 1982)

- Born: 17 October 1982 (age 43)
- Occupation: Actor
- Years active: 1997–2010
- Spouses: Satya Patel (m. 2008, divorced) Vikas Bajpai (m. 2013)

Manya (born 17 October 1982) is an Indian actress who mainly worked in Malayalam and Telugu films and a few Kannada and Tamil movies. She began her acting career in Telugu cinema. In 2000, she was introduced to Malayalam films by director Lohithadas and acted in Joker opposite Dileep.

== Personal life ==
Manya was born on 17 October 1982 to Dr. Prahladan and Padmini in a Naidu family of Andhra Pradesh. She grew up in England and until her family moved back to India when she 9. She has a younger sister, Anjana. Manya married Satya Patel on 31 May 2008 and later they got divorced. In 2013, Manya married Vikas Bajpai and they have a daughter who was born in 2016.

== Career ==
Manya started modelling at the age of 14. She soon started getting movie offers and went on to act in more than 40 movies in many South Indian languages. Manya holds a dual degree in Maths and Statistics and an MBA from Columbia University She has worked as Assistant Vice President in Credit Suisse, New York and currently works with Citi as Vice President.

== Filmography ==
Year	Film	Role	Language	Notes
1989	Swantham Ennu Karuthi		Malayalam	Child artist
1992	Kizhakke Varum Paattu		Tamil	Child artist; uncredited
1997	Swantham Makalkku Snehapoorvam		Malayalam	Uncredited
1999	Seetharama Raju	Suma	Telugu	Debut
1999	Devaa	Swathi	Telugu	
1999	Sahasabaludu - Vichitrakoti	Gunjala	Telugu	
1999	English Pellam East Godavari Mogudu	Gowri	Telugu	
1999	Bachelors	Preethi	Telugu	
1999	Sambayya	Unknown	Telugu	
2000	College	Lekha	Telugu	
2000	Joker	Kamala	Malayalam	
2000	Love	Madhumati	Telugu	
2001	Sivana	Anusha	Telugu	
2001	Vakkalathu Narayanankutty	Kukkoo Kurien	Malayalam	Choreography also
2001	Rakshasa Rajavu	Malathy	Malayalam	
2001	One Man Show	Dr. Rasiya	Malayalam	
2002	Kunjikoonan	Lakshmi	Malayalam	
2002	Naina	Vaanathi	Tamil	
2002	Ganapathi	Mahalakshmi	Telugu	
2002	Premaku Swagatam	Nammi	Telugu	
2003	Shingari Bolona	Anjali	Malayalam	
2003	Swantham Malavika	Malavika	Malayalam	
2003	Swapnakoodu	Kurjeet	Malayalam	
2004	Bramacharulu	Ganga	Telugu	
2004	Tamasha	Unknown	Telugu	
2004	Dobivala	Unknown	Malayalam	
2004	Aparichithan	Devi	Malayalam	
2004	Udayam	Anitha	Malayalam	
2005	Varsha	Veena	Kannada	
2005	Shastri	Kanakambari	Kannada	
2006	Shambu	Sahana	Kannada	
2006	Belli Betta	Easwari	Kannada	
2006	Ambi	Pallavi	Kannada	
2006	Suntaragaali	Actress	Kannada	Special appearance
2006	Kusthi	Divya	Tamil	
2007	Ee Preethi Onthara	Priyanka	Kannada	
2007	Paranju Theeratha Visheshangal	Anjana Menon	Malayalam	
2007	Enthavaaralaina	Unknown	Telugu	
2007	Rakshakan	Aswathy	Malayalam	
2008	Kanal Kannaadi	Gerly Fernando	Malayalam	
2009	Unnai Kann Theduthe	Sindhu	Tamil	
2010	Pathinonnil Vyazham	Meenakshi	Malayalam	

== Television ==
Year	Serial	Language	Channel
2002	Kanmani	Malayalam	Asianet
