= Banu Mushtaq =

Indian writer and activist (born 1948)

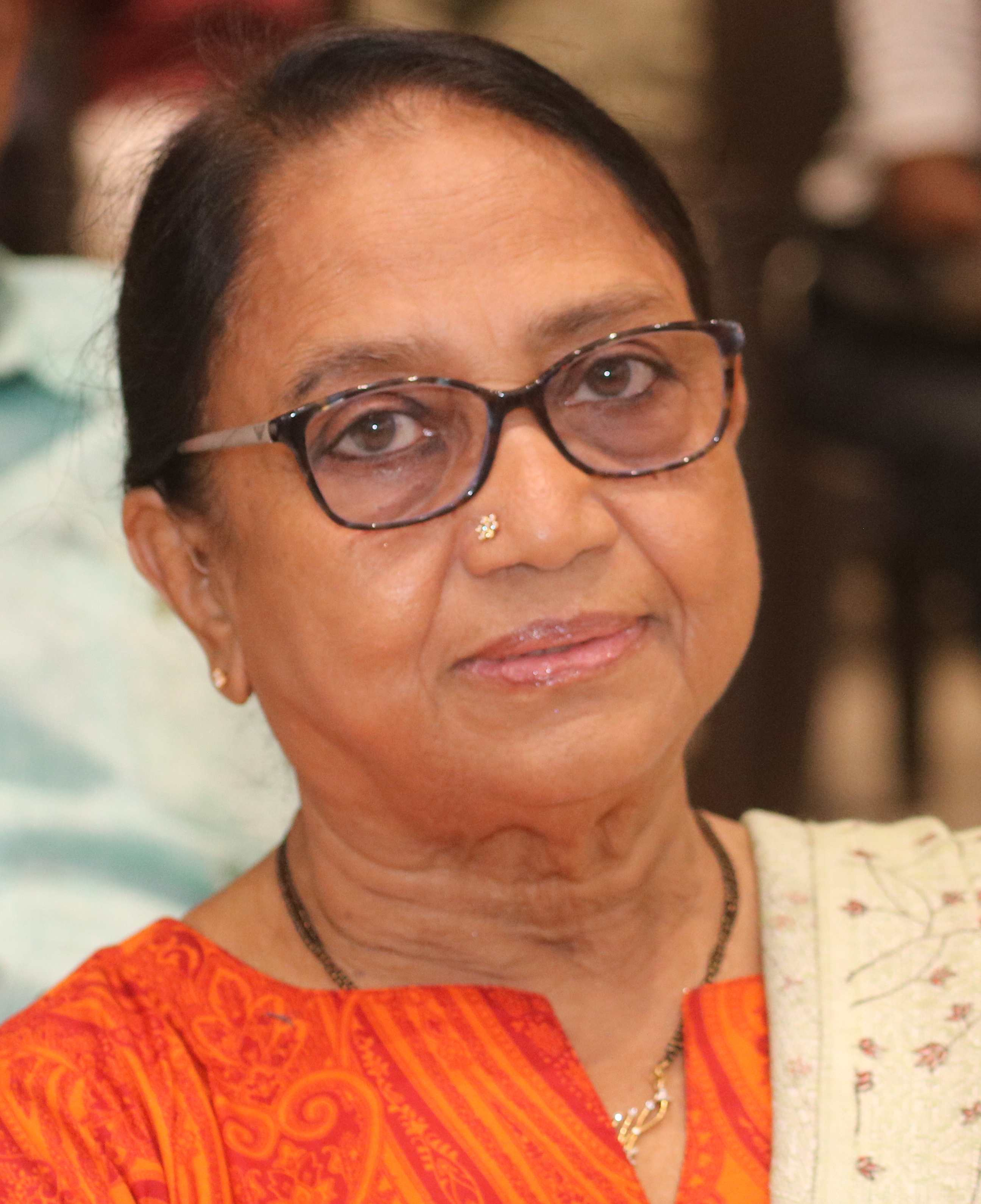
- Banu Mushtaq at Kollam, 2025
- Born: 3 April 1948 (age 78); Hassan, Mysore State, Dominion of India (now Hassan, Karnataka, India)
- Occupations: Writer, activist and lawyer
- Writing career
- Notable work: Heart Lamp (translated by Deepa Bhasthi)
- Notable awards: International Booker Prize (2025)

Banu Mushtaq (born 3 April 1948) is an Indian Kannada-language writer, activist, and lawyer from Karnataka. She is best known for Heart Lamp, a selection of her short stories translated by Deepa Bhasthi, which won the International Booker Prize in 2025. She has published six short story collections, a novel, an essay collection, and a poetry collection. Her work has been translated into Urdu, Hindi, Tamil, Malayalam and English.

== Early life ==
Banu Mushtaq was born into a Muslim family in Hassan, Karnataka, on 3 April 1948. When she was eight years old, Mushtaq was enrolled in a Kannada-language missionary school in Shivamogga, on the condition that she must learn "to read and write Kannada in six months"; she exceeded expectations by beginning to write after a few days of school.

In contrast to community expectations, she attended university and married for love at the age of 26.

== Writing career ==
She was a reporter for the newspaper Lankesh Patrike and, for some months, she worked for All India Radio in Bengaluru.

Booker prize winner Banu Mushtaq talk at Kollam 2025

Mushtaq was interested in writing from a young age, but did not become a writer until the age of 29, as a new mother suffering from postpartum depression. Mushtaq turned to writing to explore her feelings and experiences. Much of her writing looks at women's issues.

Mushtaq has published six collections of short stories, a novel, a collection of essays and a collection of poetry. Her work has been translated into Urdu, Hindi, Tamil, and Malayalam, as well as, very recently, English. Her story Karinaagaragalu was adapted into the 2003 Kannada film Hasina by Girish Kasaravalli.

=== Heart Lamp ===
Mushtaq's first full-length book to be translated into English was Heart Lamp: Selected Stories (published by And Other Stories, 2025), a selection of women-centred stories set in Muslim communities in southern India. The translator, Deepa Bhasthi, began translating Mushtaq's work into English in 2022. Bhasthi selected the volume's twelve stories from the six collections Mushtaq had published between 1990 and 2023.

In May 2025, Heart Lamp won the 2025 International Booker Prize. Mushtaq was the first Kannada-language writer to have their work nominated for the prize. Deepa Bhasthi was the first Indian translator to win the prize and this was the first short story collection ever to win the prize.

The stories in the collection reflect Mushtaq's life as a journalist and lawyer, with a focus on women's rights and resistance to caste and religious injustice in her part of the country.

Chair of the Booker International judges Max Porter said that although the stories are feminist, and "contain extraordinary accounts of patriarchal systems and resistance", first and foremost they are "beautiful accounts of everyday life and particularly the lives of women". The Guardian commented that the "tone varies from quiet to comic, but the vision is consistent" and called it a "wonderful collection".

== Mysore Dasara controversy ==
In 2025, the Karnataka state government chose Mushtaq to inaugurate its annual Mysore Dasara celebrations. The Bharatiya Janata Party criticized selecting a Muslim to lead Hindu festivities, despite the 2017 festival being inaugurated by another Muslim author, K. S. Nissar Ahmed. Mushtaq's January 2025 video criticizing the association of Hindu goddess Bhuvaneshvari with the Kannada language as exclusionary was further cited by politician Pratap Simha as indicating her incompatibility.

== Personal life and activism ==
Since the 1980s, Mushtaq has been involved in activist movements working to undermine "fundamentalism and social injustices" in Karnataka.

In 2000, a three-month "social boycott" was announced against Mushtaq and her family in response to her "advocacy of the right of Muslim women to enter mosques". During that time, she received menacing telephone calls and a man attempted to stab her but was thwarted by her husband.

In the early 2000s, Mushtaq joined the civil society group Komu Souhardha Vedike in protesting efforts to prevent Muslims from visiting a syncretic shrine in Baba Budangiri, Chikmagalur district.

Mushtaq has supported the right of Muslim students to wear hijab in schools, which has been challenged in Karnataka.

She speaks Kannada, Hindi, Dakhni Urdu, and English.

== Awards and recognition ==
- 1999: Karnataka Sahitya Academy Award
- Daana Chintamani Attimabbe Award
- 2024: PEN English Translate Award, for Deepa Bhasthi's translation of Haseena and Other Stories
- 2025: International Booker Prize for Heart Lamp, translated by Deepa Bhasthi

== Publications ==
- ಹಸೀನಾ ಮತ್ತು ಇತರ ಕಥೆಗಳು [Hasīna mattu itara kathegaḷu] (compilation, Abhiruchi Prakashana, 2013) ISBN 9788178770611, OCLC 896807078
  - Haseena and Other Stories (translated by Deepa Bhasthi, 2024)
- Heart Lamp: Selected Stories (compilation, translated by Deepa Bhasthi, And Other Stories, 2025), ISBN 9781916751163
