= Deepa Bhasthi =

Indian writer and translator (born 1983)

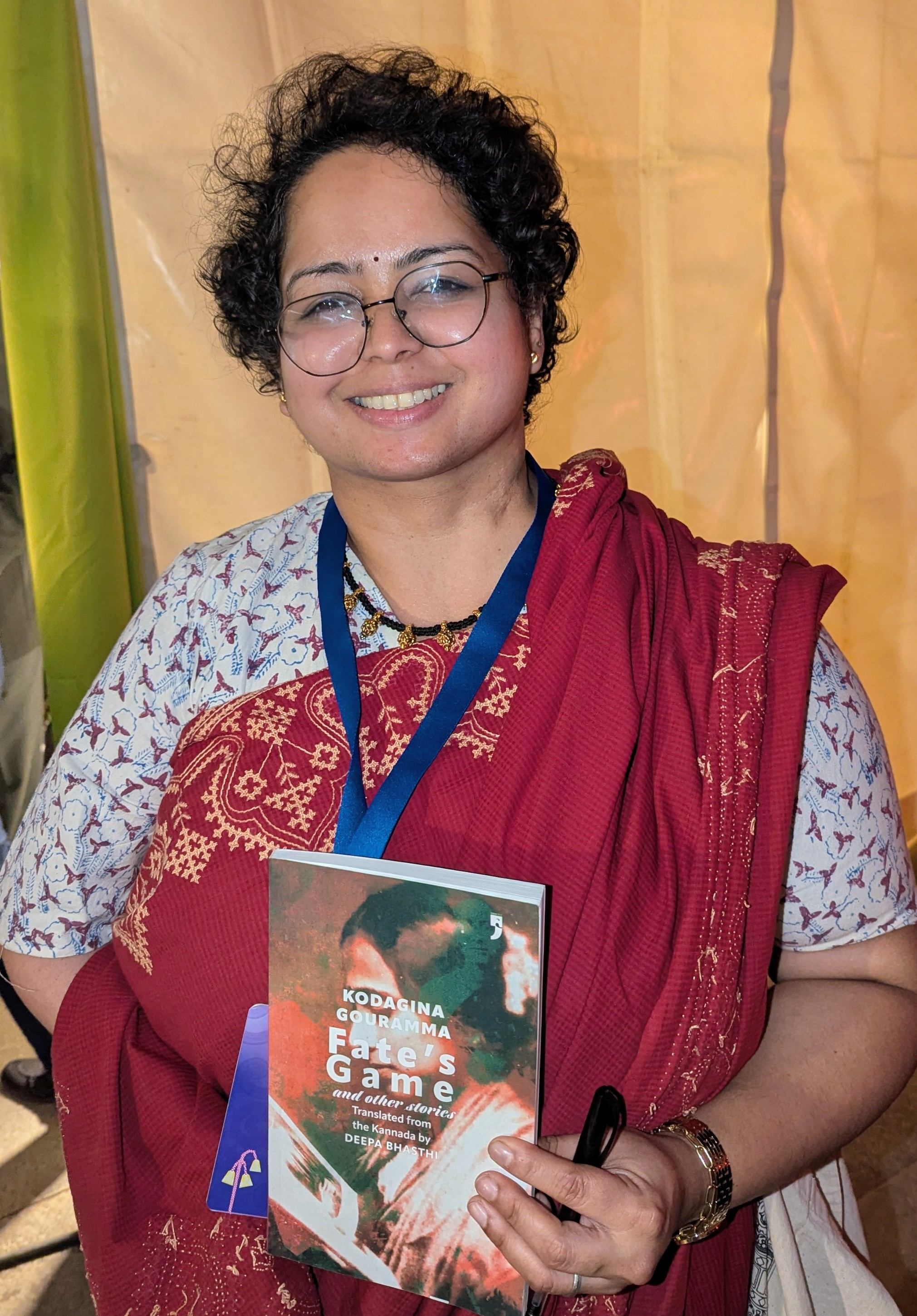
- Bhasthi at the Bengaluru Literature Festival 2025
- Born: 1983 (age 42–43); Madikeri, Karnataka, India
- Education: Field Marshal K.M. Cariappa College; Mangalore University
- Occupations: Writer, translator, journalist
- Writing career
- Language: English, Kannada
- Notable work: Heart Lamp
- Notable awards: International Booker Prize (2025), PEN Translates Award (2024)
- Website: deepabhasthi.com

Deepa Bhasthi (born 1983) is an Indian writer, literary translator and journalist from the southern state of Karnataka. She gained international recognition for her translation of the short story collection Heart Lamp by Banu Mushtaq, for which, in 2025, she became the first translator from India to win the International Booker Prize.

== Life ==
Deepa Bhasthi was born in Madikeri, Karnataka, in 1983. She attributes her love for literature to her paternal grandfather, who died six months before she was born and left her an extensive collection of books, including Russian classics.

After finishing school, she initially studied natural sciences but later switched to commerce and graduated with a bachelor's degree from Field Marshal K.M. Cariappa College in Kodagu. She then earned a degree in journalism from Mangalore University and went on to work as a journalist for various print media outlets in Bangalore. As a journalist, she has had essays, columns and critiques published in more than 40 Indian and overseas newspapers and magazines.

During her career as a journalist, Bhasthi specialised in arts journalism and eventually became a columnist and founding editor of The Forager magazine, which explores the political significance of food. In 2016, she teamed up with three other creatives to found the Forager Collective, which examines social issues such as economics, politics and culture through the lens of food.

Bhasthi lives in her hometown of Madikeri with her husband, artist and farmer Nanaiah Chettira, on a farm, along with their five dogs.

== Work ==
Deepa Bhasthi has gained international recognition for her literary translation work. Her English translation of Banu Mushtaq's short story collection Heart Lamp, which she completed over three years of work, earned her and the author the International Booker Prize in 2025. The jury praised the translation as "something genuinely new", a radical translation that "challenges and expands our understanding of translation". In her translations, Bhasthi pursues an approach she herself describes as "translating with an accent", whereby her texts deliberately retain the cultural and historical characteristics of the original language in order to ensure authenticity. In addition to Mushtaq's works, she has also translated prominent authors such as Kodagina Gowramma, a feminist pioneer of Kannada literature, and Kota Shivarama Karanth.

In addition to her work as a translator, Bhasthi is also a children's book author. Her book Champi and the Fig Tree was published in 2025.

== Awards and recognition ==
- 2024: PEN English Translate Award, for her translation of Banu Mushtaq's Haseena and Other Stories
- 2025: International Booker Prize for Heart Lamp, shared with Banu Mushtaq
