= Kanti (film) =

- Directed by: S. Bharath
- Written by: S. Bharath
- Story by: Kala Kantirava Shivarajkumar Abhimanigala Sangha (Belagavi)
- Produced by: R. Srinivas; M. Kantharaj; K. P. Srikanth
- Starring: Murali; Ramya
- Cinematography: H. C. Venu
- Edited by: T. Shashikumar
- Music by: Gurukiran
- Production companies: R. S. Productions; Company Films
- Distributed by: Company Films
- Release date: 9 July 2004
- Running time: 156 minutes
- Country: India
- Language: Kannada

Kanti is a 2004 Kannada-language romance drama film directed by debutant S. Bharath, starring Murali and Ramya. The music for the film was composed by Gurukiran.

== Plot ==
The plot revolves around a Kannada college student who upon falling in love with a Marathi girl, gets embroiled politically.

== Cast ==
- Murali as Srikantha "Kanti"
- Ramya as Reema
- Govind Namdev as Samblekar
- T.V. Gurumurthy
- Avinash as SP Avinash
- Kishore as Beera
- Pawan Kumar
- Chandru
- Vinayak Joshi as Chidanand
- Venkata Rao
- Malathi Sardeshpande as Bharathi Devi, a lecturer
- Mumtaj in a special appearance in "Ussaaru Ussaaru" song

== Production ==
The film takes place in Belgaum, a city in Karnataka that has a sizeable Marathi-speaking population. The film was shot in Bangalore and Belgaum.

== Soundtrack ==
The film's music was composed by Gurukiran.

Kanti

Soundtrack album by Gurukiran
- Released: 2004
- Genre: Feature film soundtrack
- Length: 21:28
- Label: Ashwini Recordings
- Producer: Gurukiran

Gurukiran chronology
| Partha (2003) | Kanti (2004) | Apthamitra (2004) |

| No. | Title | Lyrics | Singer(s) | Length |
|---|---|---|---|---|
| 1. | "Baaninda Baa Chandira" | Kaviraj | Sonu Nigam | 4:04 |
| 2. | "Eddelu Hey Rambha" | Bhangiranga | Mano | 3:38 |
| 3. | "Jinu Jinugo" | Kaviraj | S. P. Balasubrahmanyam, K. S. Chithra | 4:22 |
| 4. | "Bhramhachari" | Bhangiranga | Hemanth | 4:30 |
| 5. | "Ussaaru Ussaaru" | V. Manohar | Malgudi Subha | 4:55 |

== Release and reception ==
The release of the film was delayed after the film was sent to the censor revision committee.

A critic from Sify wrote that "Debutant director Bharat has taken care over the script that is convincing". A critic from Deccan Herald wrote that "Debutant director Bharat has handled the controversial Kannada-Maratha issue with all seriousness".

=== Box office ===
The film was a box office success. After the success of this film, Murali did not have a single successful film till the release of Ugramm (2014).

== Awards ==
In 2004–05 Karnataka State Film Awards, Murali won Best Actor, T Shashi Kumar won Best Editing and Kishore won the Best Supporting Actor awards.
