= Hasina (film) =

- Directed by: Girish Kasaravalli
- Screenplay by: Girish Kasaravalli
- Based on: Kari Naagaragalu by Banu Mushtaq
- Starring: Tara
- Cinematography: S. Ramachandra Aithal
- Edited by: M. N. Swamy
- Music by: Isaac Thomas Kottukapally
- Production company: Chiguru Chitra
- Release date: 2004
- Country: India
- Language: Kannada

Hasina is a 2004 Kannada-language film by Girish Kasaravalli based on the story Kari Naagaragalu by Banu Mushtaq. The lead actress, Tara, won the National Film Award for Best Actress for her role as Hasina about the story of a Muslim Indian woman deserted by her husband.

== Plot ==
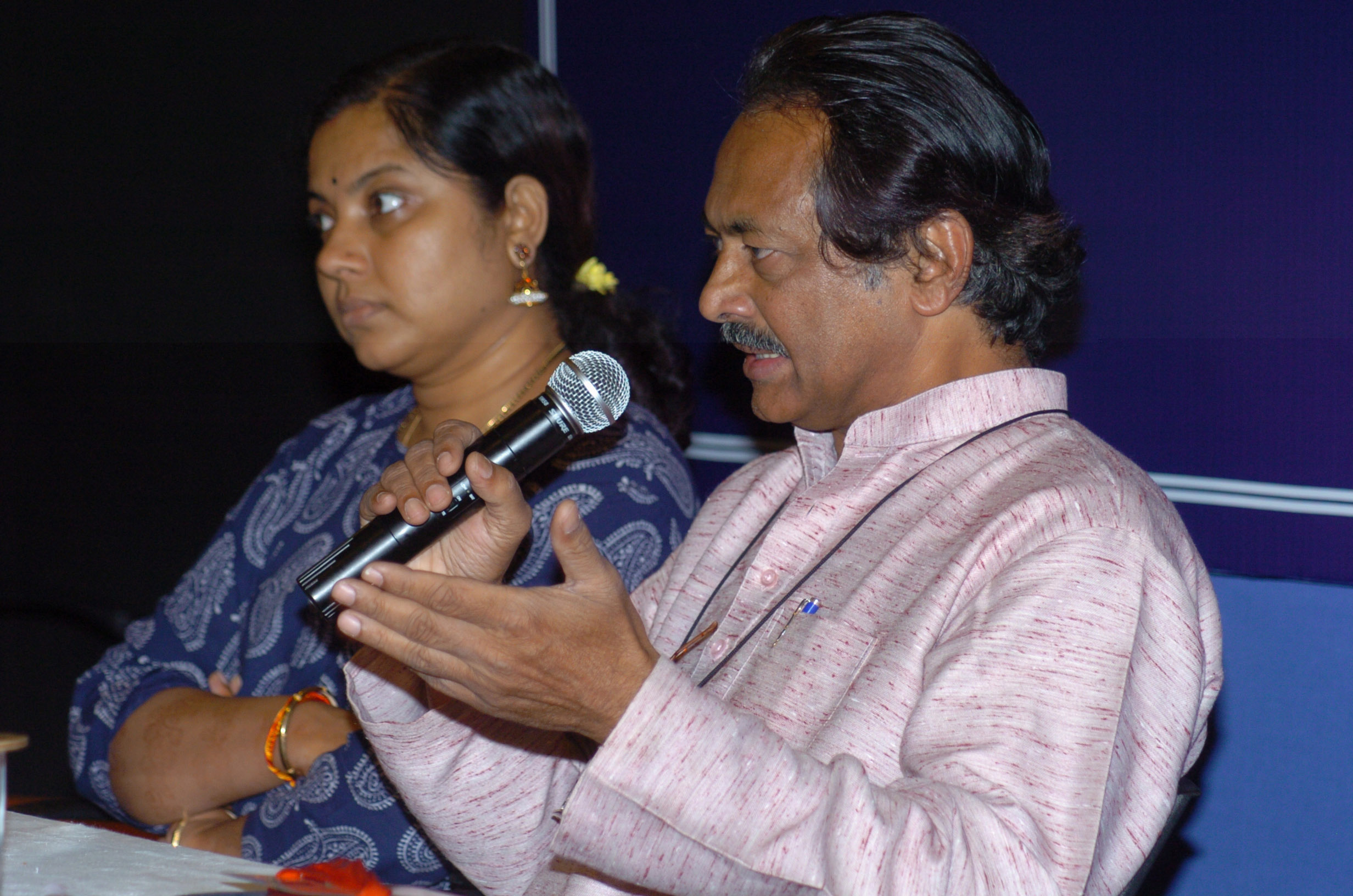
Tara (left) and Girish Kasaravalli (right), Director of the movie.

The film, based on the story Karinaagaragalu by Kannada writer Banu Mushtaq, looks at Hasina (Taara) who marries auto driver Yakub (Chandrahas Ullal) against his mother's wishes. The couple have three daughters the visually impaired Munni, Shubby and Habeeb. Pregnant with their fourth child, the couple break social codes and do a pregnancy scan to ascertain the baby's gender. When Yakub realises it is yet another girl, he becomes at turns abusive and neglectful, eventually leaving Hasina to fend for herself.

== Cast ==
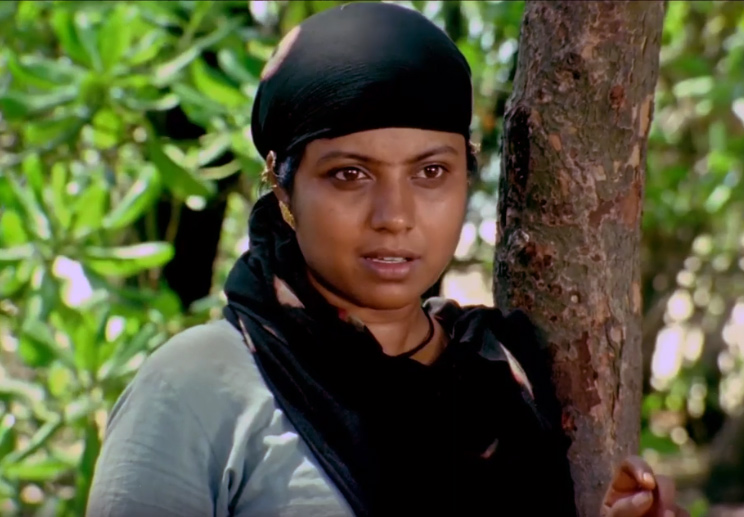
Tara in Hasina's look and her performance won her National Film Award for Best Actress.

- Tara as Hasina
- Chandrahas Ullal as Yakoob
- Chitra Shenoy as Jhuleka Begum
- Purushottam Talavata as Muthuvalli Saab
- Ruthu as Muthuvalli's wife
- R. G. Vijayasarathy as a doctor
- Baby Bodhini as Munni
- Saad as Sadath (Muthuvalli's son)

== Reception ==
Deepa Ganesh of The Hindu wrote, "The story of Hasina rises above a particular society, to become the story of any other woman who wants to break from the shackles of silence".

== Awards and honours ==
Award	Award Category – Winner
2004 National Film Awards	Best Actress – Thara; Best Costume Design – Ishrath Nissar, M. N. Swamy; Best Film on Family Welfare
Karnataka State Film Awards (2004–05)	Karnataka State Film Award for Best Social film – Girish Kasaravalli; Karnataka State Film Award for Best Child Actor (Female) – Baby Bodhini Bhargavi
