= Yashwanth =

2005 Kannada-language film

- VCD cover
- Directed by: Dayal
- Written by: Dayal
- Produced by: K. Manju
- Starring: Murali; Rakshitha
- Cinematography: Sathya Hegde
- Edited by: Vinod Manohar
- Music by: Mani Sharma
- Production company: Lakshmishree Combines
- Release date: 1 February 2005
- Running time: 131 minutes
- Country: India
- Language: Kannada

Yashwanth (spelled onscreen as Yeshwanth) is a 2005 Indian Kannada-language romantic drama directed by Dayal and starring Yashwanth and Kano.

== Cast ==
- Murali as Yashwanth
- Rakshitha
- Pawan Kumar
- Vinayak Joshi
- Sanjana
- Preethi
- Muni
- Ramesh Bhat
- Indudhar
- A. S. Murthy
- Nagashekar
- Chandu
- Tulasi Shivamani
- Vanitha Vasu as Rakshitha's mother
- Malathi Saradeshpande
- "Gundu" Gurulakshmi
- Suja (item number in "Aadu Aata Aadu")

== Production ==
This film was the third film of both director Dayal, of Baa Baaro Rasika (2004) fame, and Murali. The film's story is based on a real life incident in the director's life when he had to give up his wife's jewelry when he was under financial pressure. The film was produced by K. Manju, whose previous film Sahukara (2004) was a hit. Reena Yadav and Namitha were each considered to play one of the film's heroines before Rakshita was cast. The film was launched at Kanteerava Studios with financier K. V. Nagesh Kumar clapping the shot and KFCC president H. D. Gangaraju switching on the camera. Murali Manohara, who worked under choreographer Five Star Ganesh, debuted as a dance director with this film. Vanitha Vasu plays Rakshitha's mother in the film, who later becomes estranged. The song "Nodana Bengaluru" was shot on a double decker bus in Bangalore.

== Soundtrack ==
Yashwanth

Soundtrack album by Mani Sharma
- Released: 2005
- Recorded: 2005
- Genre: Feature film soundtrack
- Length: 29:38
- Language: Kannada

Official audio
- Yashwanth - Full Jukebox on YouTube

The songs were composed by Mani Sharma. The audio was released at KSCA Club in Bangalore. The song "Mannige Maara Baarave" was based on "Mannukku Maram Baarama" from Thai Pirandhal Vazhi Pirakkum (1958).

Track listing
No.	Title	Lyrics	Singer(s)	Length
1.	"Ambari Meleri"	V. Nagendra Prasad	Hemanth, Nanditha	4:56
2.	"Duddu Yaara Kailiddare"	Shashank	Tippu	4:27
3.	"Mannige Maara Baarave"	K. Kalyan	Karthik	5:30
4.	"Nodenna Bengalooru"	Dwarki	Karthik	4:44
5.	"Moda Modalu"	Kaviraj	Rajesh Krishnan, Nanditha	5:26
6.	"Aadu Ata Aadu"	Manjunath Rao	Chaitra H. G.	4:35
Total length:				29:38

== Reception ==
S. N. Deepak of Deccan Herald wrote "There is nothing new in the story. The director has taken up a simple story of today’s youth, mixes some action and romance and tries to make it an entertaining film. He focuses on how today’s youth spend time and invite problems. Besides, he also shows that they can also achieve something if they focus on a single goal, that’s all". A critic from Viggy wrote that "On the whole, Yashwanth is not as gripping as one would've expected it to be. Its an absolute letdown but enthralls the frontbenchers!" The film failed at the box-office.
