= Rakshasa (2005 film) =

- VCD cover
- Directed by: Sadhu Kokila
- Written by: Tushar Ranganath
- Screenplay by: Sadhu Kokila
- Produced by: Ramu
- Starring: Shiva Rajkumar; Gajala; Kishore; Rangayana Raghu
- Cinematography: Krishnakumar
- Edited by: T. Shashikumar
- Music by: Sadhu Kokila
- Production company: Ramu Films
- Release date: 25 March 2005
- Running time: 158 minutes
- Country: India
- Language: Kannada

Rakshasa (transl. Demon) is a 2005 Indian Kannada-language crime thriller film directed by Sadhu Kokila, written by Ranganath and produced by Ramu. The film features Shiva Rajkumar and Gajala in the lead roles along with Ruthika, Amrutha, Kishore and Rangayana Raghu in other pivotal roles.

The film featured original score and soundtrack composed by Sadhu Kokila. Upon release, the film was appreciated for its making style and won numerous awards at the Karnataka State Film Awards for the year 2004–05.

== Plot ==
A police officer brings down the underworld dons and murders them in staged encounters to rid the society of evil.

== Cast ==
- Shiva Rajkumar as ACP Harish Chandra "Rakshasa"
- Gajala
- Amrutha
- Ruthika as Mandakini
- Kishore as Shabbir
- Rangayana Raghu as SI Cheluvaraju
- Avinash
- H. G. Dattatreya as Freedom Fighter Doreswamy from KGF
- Ramesh Bhat
- Pavitra Lokesh
- Vijay as Thambi Palani
- R. G. Vijayasarathy
- Mimicry Dayanand
- G. K. Govinda Rao
- Tejashree (special appearance in the song "Jollu Jollu Jollayya")
- Kote Prabhakar as Selva
- Muni as Thangam
- Master Aniruddh
- Ramesh Pandit as Pandit
- Prithviraj as heroine's father
- Mohan Juneja
- Killer Venkatesh
- Kourava Venkatesh
- Jolly Bastin
- Myna Chandru
- Kuri Sagar
- K. V. Manjayya
- Shankar Rao
- Dinesh Mangaluru
- Kari Subbu
- Tushar Ranganath
- Shailaja Joshi as Harish's mother in law
- Ganesh Rao Kesarkar as Inspector Giriyappa
- Kaddipudi Chandru as bike rider with triple riding

== Production ==
The first schedule was completed in June 2004. The dance number "Jollu Jollu Jollayya" featuring Tejashree and forty dancers was shot in a set at Madhu Art Studios, Bangalore.

== Soundtrack ==
The music was composed by Sadhu Kokila and the audio was sold on Jhankar Music label.

Track listing
No.	Title	Lyrics	Singer(s)	Length
1.	"Reelu Illi Helodella"	Kaviraj	Shankar Mahadevan	4:51
2.	"Kumbara Madike Maadida"	K. Kalyan	Hariharan, Nanditha	4:22
3.	"Jollu Jollu Jollayya"	V. Nagendra Prasad	Chaitra H. G.	4:40
4.	"Ninagagi Ninagagi"	K. Kalyan	Hemanth, Nagachandrika	4:41
5.	"Gooli Gooli Gurayisu"	Ranganath	Udit Narayan, Malathi	3:55
6.	"Odu Odu Odu"	Ranganath	Sadhu Kokila	2:21
7.	"Raakshasa (Victory Theme)"		Sadhu Kokila	1:45
Total length:				26:35

== Reception ==
R. G. Vijayasarathy of Rediff.com wrote that "Raakshasa was a hugely expected film, and does not belie the expectations. Kannada film fans will certainly find it exceptional". A critic from Sify wrote that "On the whole go ahead and watch this edge of the seat action thriller". S. N. Deepak of Deccan Herald wrote "The director narrates the story through various episodes which glorify the hero. At the same time, he takes care to ensure that it is logical. He has also effectively used the flashback scenes.The action scenes, particularly the opening and the climax scenes, have been shot effectively".

== Awards ==
- 2004–05 Karnataka State Film Awards :
1. Best Supporting Actor - Kishore
2. Best Music director - Sadhu Kokila
3. Best Art Director - Dinesh Mangalore
4. Best Child actor - Aniruddh
