= Kishore (actor, born 1974) =

Indian actor

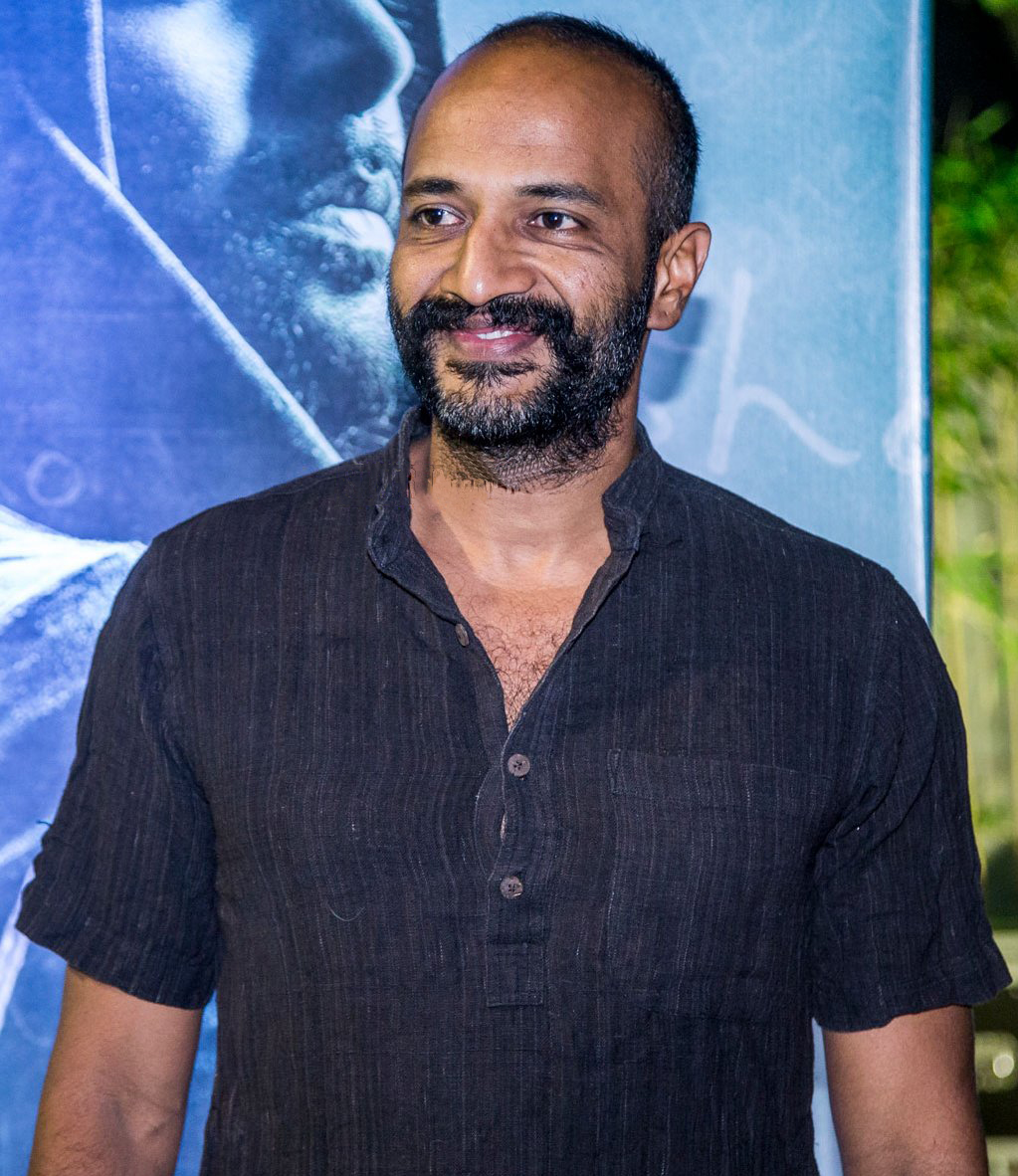
- Kishore at Yaar Ivan audio launch
- Born: Kishore Kumar G 14 August 1974 (age 52); Channapatna, Karnataka, India
- Occupation: Actor
- Years active: 2000–present
- Works: Full list
- Spouse: Vishalakshi
- Children: 2
- Relatives: D. R. Nagaraj (uncle)

Kishore Kumar G (born 14 August 1974), known mononymously as Kishore, is an Indian actor who appears in Kannada, Tamil and Telugu films, alongside a few Malayalam and Hindi films.

== Early life and education ==
Kishore was born on 14 August 1974 in Channapatna, a town in the southern part of Karnataka. His father was a professor and mother, a homemaker. Kishore completed a major part of his schooling in Kunigal, Karnataka, and college education in National College, Bangalore. This was where he started off with theatre doing plays in Kannada such as Teregalu and Samrata Ashoka. He then did his master's degree in Kannada literature from Bangalore University. He took up teaching in a college in Bangalore where he worked for two years and then as an assistant to fashion designer Vidyasagar, a professor from National Institute of Fashion Technology (NIFT). His uncle was cultural critic D. R. Nagaraj. He is married to his college sweetheart Vishalakshi. During this time, he worked as a salesman for newspapers Deccan Herald and Prajavani.

== Career ==
Kishore made his film debut in the 2004 Kannada film Kanti, acting in the role Beera. He got a role in the film after having been identified initially as the costume designer of the film and eventually went on to win a State award for his role in it.

For his role in the films Kanti and Rakshasa, he won the Karnataka State Award for Best Supporting Actor. He played a tough elder brother of heroines in Akash and Kallarali Hoovagi. He was approached by director Vetrimaaran to work in Desiya Nedunchalai, as he was looking for an actor who could speak Tamil with a Kannada accent. The film was dropped, but he got a chance to act in Polladhavan. The film was a major success at the box office leading to further collaborations with the director.

His other roles include a no non-sense cop in Duniya (2007) and a Kabaddi coach in Vennila Kabadi Kuzhu (2009).

In 2013, he appeared in a forest brigand Veerappan in Attahasa. and a low-budget film Jatta in which played the role of a forest guard. He was also in the Tamil films Haridas as a police officer raising his autistic kid and makes him an athlete and Arrambam where he also played a cop.

In Echcharikkai (2018), Kishore plays the role of a crook who kidnaps a girl for money along with a fellow crook. He later acted in famous web series The Family Man, where he played the role of commando who fights against terrorists. He gained greater recognition for his performance in Kantara (2023). He played a police officer in Kannur Squad (2023), a Malayalam crime thriller. He was also seen alongside Salman Khan in AR Murugadoss's Sikandar (2025).
