= List of Kannada films of 2010 =

A list of Kannada language films produced in the Kannada film industry in India in 2010.

After the demise of the Vishnuvardhan, the legendary icon of Kannada Cinema by the end of 2009, his posthumous release Aptharakshaka made good number Puneeth's Jackie movie became the highest grossing movie of the year while Sudeep and Ramya's Just Math Maathalli became the musical hit of the year.

Other notable movies include Krishnan Love Story, Krishna Nee Late Aagi Baaro, Kanasemba Kudureyaneri, Super, Ullasa Utsaha and Pancharangi.

In addition to Puneeth, Sudeep and Ramya, Upendra's Super performed well at the box office. Ajay Rao and Radhika Pandit starred in commercially successful ventures, Diganth, Neethu and Ganesh also saw steady releases throughout the year.

This year also saw fresh faces like Nidhi Subbaiah with 2 hits (Pancharangi and Krishna Nee Late Aagi Baaro), Malayalam actress Bhavana in Jackie and Nayanthara making her Kannada debut with Super.

- Films are generally released every Friday
- In addition films can be released on specific festival days.

== Released films ==
A total of 137 films were released in the year 2010

=== List of released films ===
The following is a list of films produced in the Kannada film industry in India in 2010, presented in alphabetical order.

=== January–June ===
| Opening | | Title | Director | Cast | Music director | Genre | Notes | Ref |
|---|---|---|---|---|---|---|---|---|
| J A N | 1st | Minugu | Jaywanth Anthony | Sunil Raoh, Pooja Gandhi, Akshata Raghunath, Ajith Hande | Gopu | Romance | | |
| J A N | 1st | Naan Maadiddu Thappa? | N. Veerendra Patil | Kavyashree, Jagadish, Rashmitha, Ninasam Ashwath | Aarya | Drama | | |
| J A N | 1st | Police Quarters | A. M. R. Ramesh | Sonu, Anish Tejeshwar, Dileep Raj | James Vasanthan | Action | | |
| J A N | 1st | Sri Banashankari Matha | Hamsa Shyam Vijeth | Hamsa Shyam Vijeth, Anu Prabhakar, Bharath Kalyankumar, Umesh Puranik | V. Manohar | Devotional | | |
| J A N | 8th | Samagama | Kasturi Jagnanath | Vidya, Vishranth, Ramakrishna | Kiran | Romance | | |
| J A N | 8th | Preethiya Theru | Prasad | Thanil, Madhumitha, Rachana Mourya | Prasad | Romance | | |
| J A N | 14th | Suryakaanti | K. M. Chaitanya | Chetan Kumar, Regina Cassandra | Ilaiyaraaja | Romance | | |
| J A N | 22nd | Anishchitha | M. A. Rehman Pasha | Pavitra Lokesh, Devaraj, Suresh Heblikar, H. G. Dattatreya | Raj Bhaskar | Thriller | Based on a novel by Padma Shenoy | |
| J A N | 22nd | School Master | Dinesh Babu | Suhasini, Vishnuvardhan, Devaraj, Tara, Avinash | Sridhar V. Sambhram | Drama | | |
| J A N | 28th | Porki | M. D. Sridhar | Darshan, Pranitha Subhash, Avinash | V. Harikrishna | Action | Remake of Telugu film Pokkiri | |
| J A N | 29th | Aparaadhi | H. S. Rajashekar | Sangeetha, Devaraj, Avinash, Abhijith | Vijaya Bharathi | Action | | |
| J A N | 29th | Ku Ku | Upendra | Master Vijay, Baby Vanitha, Sagar Nagabhushan, Rangashai, Chandrakala | Sagar Nagabhushan | Children's film | | |
| F E B | 5th | Just Maath Maathalli | Sudeep | Sudeep, Ramya, Avinash, Yathiraj | Raghu Dixit | Romance | | |
| F E B | 5th | Kolminchu | Sangeeth Sagar | Arundhati | | | | |
| F E B | 5th | Yaare Nee Devathe | S. K. Nagendra Urs | Kumar, Sangeetha Shetty, Dharma | Venkat-Narayan | Romance | | |
| F E B | 12th | Crazy Kutumba | B. Ramamurthy | Ramesh Aravind, Ananth Nag, Sanathini, Dhanya, Bank Janardhan | Ricky Kej | Comedy | Remake of Marathi film De Dhakka | |
| F E B | 12th | Vimukthi | P. Sheshadri | Bhavana, Ramakrishna, Sania | Pravin Godkhindi | Drama | | |
| F E B | 19th | Aptharakshaka | P. Vasu | Vishnuvardhan, Lakshmi Gopalaswamy, Sandhya, Vimala Raman, Bhavana, Vinaya Prasad | Gurukiran | Horror, Drama | Sequel to the film Apthamitra | |
| F E B | 19th | Belli Modada Ambara | B. S. Sanjay | Teena Ponnappa, Madhusudhan, Poornima Vishwanth | Sanjeev | Romance | | |
| F E B | 19th | Mukhaputa | Roopa Iyer | Roopa Iyer, Sanya Iyer | Hamsalekha | Drama | | |
| F E B | 26th | Jugaari | S. D. Arvind | Avinash Diwakar, Harshika Poonacha, Avinash | Arjun Janya | Drama | | |
| F E B | 26th | Sugreeva | Om Prakash Rao + 10 directors | Shivarajkumar, Yagna Shetty, Harish Raj, Dileep Raj | Gurukiran | Action | | |
| F E B | 26th | Varshadhare | Vemagal Jagannath Rao | Mithun Tejaswi, Payal Ghosh, Suraj, Sangeetha Shetty | B. Ajaneesh Loknath | Drama | | |
| M A R | 5th | Janani | Rajkumar Chandulal | Vibha Rai, Prakash Rai, Kushboo, Jayasudha, Abdullah | Asif Ali | Drama | | |
| M A R | 5th | Nanna Olavina Banna | Bhushan | Ashwini, Shantala, Somasekhar | V. Manohar | Romance | | |
| M A R | 5th | Preethi Nee Shashwatha Na? | L. N. Murthy | Akshay Kumar, Keerthi, Gopi Krishna | K. Kalyan | Romance | | |
| M A R | 12th | Sihigaali | Lekhan | Sri Murali, Sherin, Sharan | G. R. Shankar | Romance | | |
| M A R | 12th | Sri Harikathe | Dayal Padmanabhan | Sri Murali, Pooja Gandhi, Radhika Gandhi, Naveen Krishna | Sameer Kulkarni | Romance | | |
| M A R | 19th | Dildara | Amar | Aman, Reshma Chengappa, Kishore, Rangayana Raghu | Praveen D. Rao | Action | | |
| M A R | 19th | Swayamvara | Anantha Raju | Diganth, Srinagar Kitty, Sharmila Mandre, Tara | Manikanth Kadri | Romance | | |
| M A R | 26th | 35/100 Just Pass | H. T. Deepak | Vikram, Raghu, Shwetha, Shankar | Pranava | Drama | | |
| M A R | 26th | Nirdoshi | N. Govardhan | Piyush, Anand, Kashish Richa, Arya, Manoj, Kulbhushan Kharbanda | N. Govardhan | Drama | | |
| A P R | 2nd | Premism | Ratnaja | Chetan Chandra, Amoolya, Varun | Hamsalekha | Romance | | |
| A P R | 2nd | Sathya | Kumar Govind | Kumar Govind, Manasi | Goutham | Action | | |
| A P R | 2nd | Thipparalli Tharlegalu | S. V. Rajendra Singh Babu | S. Narayan, Komal Kumar, Ambareesh | M. N. Krupakar | Comedy | | |
| A P R | 9th | Khiladi Krishna | Jayanth | Vijay Raghavendra, Tejaswini Prakash | Rajesh Ramanath | Comedy | | |
| A P R | 9th | Krishna Nee Late Aagi Baaro | Mohan Shankar | Ramesh Aravind, Neethu, Nidhi Subbaiah, Mohan Shankar | Pravin Godkhindi | Comedy | | |
| A P R | 9th | Parole | Shekar | Kishore, Sooraj Lokre, Vishwas, Likith Shetty, Sharath, Supreetha, Pradeep Bogadi | Balaji K. Mitran | Action | | |
| A P R | 23rd | Prithvi | Jacob Verghese | Puneeth Rajkumar, Parvathy Thiruvothu, Avinash | Manikanth Kadri | Action drama | | |
| A P R | 23rd | Antharathma | B. Shankar | Mithun Tejaswi, Vishakha Singh, Rohan Gowda, Umashree | Giridhar Diwan | Horror | | |
| A P R | 30th | Ijjodu | M. S. Sathyu | Anirudhh, Meera Jasmine | Manikanth Kadri | Drama | | |
| A P R | 30th | Preethi Nee Heegeke | Suresh Hangal | Harish, Tejaswini Prakash | Drums Deva | Romance | | |
| A P R | 30th | Ullasa Utsaha | Devaraja Palan | Ganesh, Yami Gautam, Doddanna, Rangayana Raghu | G. V. Prakash Kumar | Romance | | |
| M A Y | 7th | Abhiram | Srinivasa Gundra Reddy | Santosh, Swathi, Akshitha, Sandhyasri, Venugopal, Dayananda Sharma, TV Srikanta | Basheer | Romance | | |
| M A Y | 7th | Bombat Car | Rama Narayanan | Ravishankar Gowda, Doddanna, Sharan, Sangeetha, Ramya Krishnan | Deva | Fantasy | | |
| M A Y | 14th | Naanu Nanna Kanasu | Prakash Raj | Prakash Raj, Amoolya, Sithara, Ramesh Aravind | Hamsalekha | Drama | Remake of Tamil film Abhiyum Naanum | |
| M A Y | 14th | Preethiyinda Ramesh | Gunakumar | Ramesh Aravind, Ramnitu Chaudhary, Suma Guha | A. T. Raveesh | Romance | Inspired by You've Got Mail | |
| M A Y | 14th | Tharangini | Srinivas Kaushik | Mohan Shankar, Tejaswini Prakash, B. C. Patil, Shobaraj, Srinivasa Murthy, Doddanna | M. S. Maruthi | Drama | Based on Novel "Neenarigadeyo" by Usha Navarathnaram | |
| M A Y | 21st | Nooru Janmaku | Nagathihalli Chandrashekar | Santhosh, Aindrita Ray, Bhavya, Sharan | Mano Murthy | Romance | | |
| M A Y | 21st | Shankar IPS | M. S. Ramesh | Duniya Vijay, Catherine Tresa, Ragini Dwivedi, Rangayana Raghu | Gurukiran | Action | | |
| M A Y | 28th | Nannavanu | Srinivasa Raju | Prajwal Devaraj, Aindrita Ray, Komal Kumar | Ilaiyaraaja | Romance | | |
| M A Y | 28th | Khadak | G. K. Mudduraj | Jitesh, Padmavathi, Jai Jagadish, Om Prakash Rao, Maruthi, Lamboo Nagesh | S. P. Chandrakanth | Action | | |
| J U N | 4th | Aithalakkadi | J. G. Krishna | Rangayana Raghu, Bullet Prakash, Neethu, Sharan | Sadhu Kokila | Comedy | | |
| J U N | 4th | Hoo | V. Ravichandran | V. Ravichandran, Namitha, Meera Jasmine | V. Harikrishna | Romance | | |
| J U N | 11th | Thamassu | Agni Shridhar | Shiva Rajkumar, Padmapriya, Harshika Poonachha, Nassar | Sandeep Chowta | Action | | |
| J U N | 11th | Beli Matthu Hola | P. R. Ramadas Naidu | Achyuth Kumar, Huligappa Kattimani, Srinivas Meshtru, Venkata Rao, Ganesh Rao, Escort Srinivas | Raju Upendrakumar | Drama | | |
| J U N | 18th | Krishnan Love Story | Shashank | Ajay Rao, Radhika Pandit, Sharan, Harsha, Pradeep | Sridhar V. Sambhram | Romance | | |
| J U N | 18th | Punda | H. Vasu | Yogesh, Meghana Raj, Sharath Lohitashwa, Petrol Prasanna | G. V. Prakash Kumar | Romance / Action | Remake of Tamil film Polladhavan | |
| J U N | 25th | Mr. Theertha | Sadhu Kokila | Sudeep, Saloni Aswani, Ananth Nag, Geetha | Gurukiran | Action | | |
| J U N | 25th | Haaru Hakkiyaneri | A. N. Prasanna | Jayaram Tatachar, Vasudha Bharighat, Kishore, Master Vasudev Ram, Nirmala, Ramesh Athreya | Praveen D. Rao | Documentary | | |
| J U N | 25th | Jotheyagi Hithavagi | S. K. Srinivas | Chandan, Tejaswini Prakash, Tara | Drums Deva | Romance | | |

=== July–December ===
| Opening | | Title | Director | Cast | Music director | Genre | Notes | Ref |
|---|---|---|---|---|---|---|---|---|
| J U L | 2nd | Hendtheer Darbar | V. Sekhar | Ramesh Aravind, Meena, Sadhu Kokila, Rangayana Raghu | Sadhu Kokila | Comedy drama | | |
| J U L | 2nd | Holi | Shankarlinga Sugnalli | Venkatesh Prasad, Ragini Dwivedi, Shobaraj, Doddanna, Karibasavaiah, Padmaja Rao, Pavitra Lokesh | Amarapriya; Shivasharana Sugnalli | Drama | | |
| J U L | 2nd | Preethi Andre Ishtena | Ravikanth | Nabhay, Meghana Khanna, Master Anand, Doddanna, Jayanthi | A. T. Raveesh | Romance | | |
| J U L | 2nd | Pareekshe | A. R. Ravindra | Anu Prabhakar, Muniraj, Vinaya Prasad, Enagi Balappa | Hemanth Kumar | Drama | | |
| J U L | 2nd | Rowdy Hrudaya | Shivakumar | Rakesh, Kavyashree, Sundar | Ravishankar | Action | | |
| J U L | 2nd | Zamana | Lucky Shankar Aditya | Jackie Shroff, Nitish J. P, Vineeth Kumar, Aakarsha, Sadhu Kokila | Karthik Raja | Action | | |
| J U L | 9th | Eradane Maduve | Dinesh Baboo | Ananth Nag, Suhasini Maniratnam, Prem Kumar, Jennifer Kotwal, Tara, Sharan | Jayapal | Comedy | | |
| J U L | 9th | Jayahe | Thriller Manju | Ayesha, Jai Akash, Thriller Manju, Gowri Pandit | M. N. Krupakar | Action | | |
| J U L | 9th | Olave Vismaya | T. N. Nagesh | Dharma Keerthiraj, Prathibha Rani, Spoorthy, Ananth Nag, Padmaja Rao | Veer Samarth | Romance | | |
| J U L | 16th | Sanchari | Kiran Govi | Raj, Bianca Desai, Rangayana Raghu | Arjun Janya | Action | | |
| J U L | 16th | Lift Kodla | Ashok Kashyap | Jaggesh, Komal, Archana Gupta, Shobaraj | V. Manohar | Comedy | | |
| J U L | 23rd | Nam Areal Ond Dina | Aravind Kaushik | Anish Tejeshwar, Meghana Gaonkar, Rakshit Shetty | Arjun Janya | Drama | | |
| J U L | 23rd | Banni | Godachi Maharudra | Akul Balaji, Sowmya Revadi, Master Anand, Srikanth Deshpande, Kashi, Gururaja Hoskote, Ninasam Ashwath | Leo | Romance | | |
| J U L | 23rd | Meshtru | Mahadevu | Devaraj, Bhanupriya, Mansoor Ali Khan, Dileep Pai, Seetha, Sujibala | K. M. Indra | Drama | | |
| J U L | 30th | Gandedhe | Akula Shiva | Chiranjeevi Sarja, Ragini Dwivedi, Devaraj, Rangayana Raghu | Chakri | Action | | |
| J U L | 30th | Chandulli Cheluve | Shyam; Siddaraju | Shyam, Charmila, Srinivasa Murthy, Bank Janardhan | Rajan–Nagendra | Romance | | |
| J U L | 30th | Idre Gopi Bidre Paapi | G. V. Ramarao | Jagadish Raj, Madhusudhan, Bindhu Shri, Umashri, Spoorthi Suresh, Ramesh Bhat | Ravi Shenoy | Comedy | | |
| J U L | 30th | Nee Bandu Ninthaga | Shekar Sarvanan | Sourav Sharma, Jyothikashri, Ramya Barna, Ramesh Bhat, Vinaya Prasad | E. L. Indrajith | Romance | | |
| J U L | 30th | Gurukula | Sunil Puranik | Srinivas Prabhu, Master Sachin Bharadwaj, Master Sameer Puranik, Master Sourav Kulkarni | Mysore Gopi | Documentary | | |
| A U G | 6th | Cheluveye Ninne Nodalu | D. P. Raghuram | Shivrajkumar, Sonal Chauhan | V. Harikrishna | Romance | | |
| A U G | 6th | Mathe Mungaru | Dwarki Raghav | Srinagar Kitty, Rachana Malhotra, Ravishankar Gowda, Achyuth Kumar | Paul Raj | Romance | | |
| A U G | 6th | Shambo Shankara | Chindodi Bangaresh | Naveen Krishna, Mohan Shankar, Jamuna, Ashwini, Roopasri | M. S. Maruthi | Comedy | | |
| A U G | 6th | Gangleader | Ramesh Raj | Adi Lokesh, Devaraj, Yamini Sharma, Madhupriya, Kishore, Rangayana Raghu, Dharma Umesh | Abhiman Roy | Action | | |
| A U G | 13th | Deadly-2 | Ravi Srivatsa | Aditya, Meghana, Devaraj, Suhasini Maniratnam, Ravi Kale | L. N. Shastry | Action | | |
| A U G | 13th | Jokaali | M. M. Deepak | Gowrishankar SRG, Udhayathara, Ravi Kale, Rangayana Raghu, Umashri | S. A. Rajkumar | Drama | | |
| A U G | 13th | Kunidu Kunidu Baare | S. Nandakumar | Aniruddh, Sona, Tara | K. Kalyan | Romance | | |
| A U G | 20th | Shourya | Sadhu Kokila | Darshan, Madalasa Sharma, Reemma | Sadhu Kokila | Action | | |
| A U G | 28th | Hunja | Jayanth | Mayur Patel, Deepika, Avinash | Rajesh Ramanath | Action | | |
| A U G | 28th | Preethi Hangama | Vivek Raj | Vivek Raj, Shubha Poonja, Avinash | Rajkiran | Romance | | |
| S E P | 3rd | Kari Chirathe | K. Madesh | Duniya Vijay, Sharmiela Mandre, Yagna Shetty | Sadhu Kokila | Action | | |
| S E P | 3rd | Pancharangi | Yogaraj Bhat | Diganth, Nidhi Subbaiah, Ananth Nag, Priyanka Trivedi, Ramya Barna | Mano Murthy | Romance | | |
| S E P | 3rd | Onti Mane | Vittal Kumar | Vinod Alva, Divya, Doddanna | Layendra | Horror | | |
| S E P | 9th | Nanjangud Nanjunda | Srinivas Prasad | Ravishankar Gowda, Hamsini, K. S. L. Swamy, Nagaraj Kote | Ravichandra | Comedy | | |
| S E P | 10th | Jothegara | Ram Prasad | Prem Kumar, Ramya, Lakshmi, Doddanna, Sadhu Kokila | Sujith Shetty | Romance | | |
| S E P | 10th | Narada Vijaya | Manju M | Shashikumar, Harish Raj, Mohini Vishwas | Raj Bhaskar | Comedy | | |
| S E P | 17th | Appu and Pappu | Anantha Raju | Abbas, Snehith, Rekha Vedavyas, Rangayana Raghu, Komal Kumar, Madhuri Itagi | Hamsalekha | Comedy | | |
| S E P | 24th | Gubbi | Vijay | Ajith Patre, Reema Worah, Rangayana Raghu | Arjun Janya | Romance | | |
| S E P | 24th | Yakka | Naganath M. Joshi | Bharat Kalyan, Subhashini, Ramesh Pawar | M. N. Krupar | Action | | |
| O C T | 1st | Hrudayadhalli Idhenidhu | Sivan | Rahul, Vandana Gupta, Monica, Roopali Sood, Rangayana Raghu, Avinash | Dharma Prakash | Romance | | |
| O C T | 14th | Jackie | Duniya Soori | Puneeth Rajkumar, Bhavana (Malayalam actress), Rangayana Raghu | V. Harikrishna | Action | | |
| O C T | 15th | Kichha Huchha | Chi. Guru Dutt | Sudeep, Ramya, Srinath | V. Harikrishna | Action | | |
| O C T | 22nd | Vichitra Premi | S. N. Kumar | Ravi Kumar, Divya Sridhar, Bank Janardhan | Gandharva | Romance | | |
| O C T | 22nd | Sandalwood Guru | Manas | Manas, Akshata Shetty, Sathya Venkatesh, Navya | James Architect | Romance | | |
| O C T | 28th | Yaksha | Ramesh R. Bhagavath | Yogesh, Nana Patekar, Atul Kulkarni, Rubi Pariwar, Komal Kumar | Anoop Seelin | Action | | |
| O C T | 29th | Veera Parampare | S. Narayan | Ambareesh, Sudeep, Aindrita Ray, Vijayalakshmi Singh | S. Narayan / Dharma Vish (background score) | Action | | |
| O C T | 29th | Gaana Bajaana | Prashant Raj | Tarun Chandra, Radhika Pandit, Dileep Raj | Joshua Sridhar | Romance | | |
| O C T | 29th | Gundragovi | Tharesh Raj | Sathya, Navyashree, Sharath Lohitashwa, Ninasam Ashwath, Rohith | Phoenix Rajan | Drama | | |
| N O V | 5th | Shock | H. S. Rajashekar | Ramesh Aravind, Suma Guha, Ninasam Ashwath | M. S. Maruthi | Thriller | Remake of Hindi film Kaun | |
| N O V | 5th | Bindaas Hudugi | Priya Hassan | Priya Hassan, Ravishankar Gowda, Jayanthi, Ninasam Ashwath | Erra Ramesh | Action | | |
| N O V | 12th | Huduga Hudugi | Indrajit Lankesh | Dhyan, Lekha Washington, Ileana D'Cruz, Sadha, Sanjjana | Joshua Sridhar / Dharma Vish (background score) | Romance | | |
| N O V | 12th | Eno Onthara | Mussanje Mahesh | Ganesh, Priyamani, Sharan | Jassie Gift | Romance | | |
| N O V | 19th | Chirru | Mahesh Babu | Chiranjeevi Sarja, Kriti Kharbanda, Rangayana Raghu | Giridhar Diwan | Action | | |
| N O V | 19th | Madhura Prema | Asma Banu | Utthamraj, Sushma, Vikramadathiya Sharma, Akhil, Sadiq | K. M. Indra | Romance | | |
| N O V | 26th | Bisile | Sandeep Gowda | Diganth, Jennifer Kotwal, Dwarakish, Jai Jagadish | Gagan - Hari | Romance | | |
| N O V | 26th | Naariya Seere Kadda | Annaiah | V. Ravichandran, Nikita Thukral, Harshika Poonacha, Naveen Krishna | V. Manohar | Comedy | | |
| D E C | 3rd | Super | Upendra | Upendra, Nayantara, Tulip Joshi, Sadhu Kokila | V. Harikrishna | Action drama | | |
| D E C | 10th | Naa Rani Nee Maharani | B. Ramamurthy | Pooja Gandhi, Akshay, Ramesh Bhat | Vinay Chandra | Romance | | |
| D E C | 10th | Kanasemba Kudureyaneri | Girish Kasaravalli | Vijanath Biradar, Umashri, Pavitra Lokesh | V. Manohar | Drama | | |
| D E C | 17th | Huli | Om Prakash Rao | Kishore, Jennifer Kotwal, Adi Lokesh | Abhiman Roy | Action | | |
| D E C | 17th | Naayaka | PC Shekhar | Naveen, Ragini Dwivedi, Rajendran | Praveen Dutt | Action | | |
| D E C | 17th | Rame Gowda vs Krishna Reddy | T. N. Nagesh | Ananth Nag, Rangayana Raghu, Shashikumar, Roopasri | Krishnavardhan Kulkarni | Comedy | Remake of Hindi film Khosla Ka Ghosla | |
| D E C | 24th | Mylari | R. Chandru | Shiva Rajkumar, Sadha, Sanjjana | Gurukiran | Drama | | |
| D E C | 30th | Modala Sala | Purushottham C Somanathapura | Yash, Bhama, Rangayana Raghu | V. Harikrishna | Romance | | |
| D E C | 31st | Vaare Vah | Vijayalakshmi Singh | Komal Kumar, Bhavana Rao, Mayuri | Vishwajith | Comedy | | |
| D E C | 31st | Vismaya Pranaya | Mohan Mallapalli | Mayuri Saini, Kavya Sri, Ravi, Raj Sagar, Hema Choudhary | Maruthi Meerajkar; K. Vishwanathan | Romance | | |

== Notable deaths ==
| Month | Date | Name | Age | Profession | Notable films | Reference |
| January | 18 | K. S. Ashwath | 85 | Actor | Naagarahaavu • Kasturi Nivasa • Belli Moda | |
| January | 21 | Chindodi Leela | 72 | Actress | Kiththoor Chennamma • Gaali Gopura • Krishnadevaraya • Sharapanjara | |
| February | 27 | B. K. Shankar | 56 | Actor | Ganeshana Maduve • Ganeshana Galaate • Gowri Ganesha | |
| September | 8 | Murali | 46 | Actor | Prema Parva • Ajeya • Prema Gange | |
| September | 12 | Swarnalatha | 37 | Playback Singer | Kempu Gulabi • Manasella Neene | |
| December | 12 | B. S. Ranga | 93 | Director | Mahasathi Anasuya • Amarashilpi Jakkanachari • Mannina Magalu | |

== See also ==
- Kannada films of 2011
- Kannada films of 2009
- Cinema of Karnataka
