= Moodu Pani (soundtrack) =

1980 soundtrack album by Ilaiyaraaja

- Digital cover

Soundtrack album by Ilaiyaraaja
- Released: 1980
- Genre: Film soundtrack
- Language: Tamil
- Label: EMI
- Producer: Ilaiyaraaja

Ilaiyaraaja chronology
Anbukku Naan Adimai (1980)	Moodu Pani (1980)	Murattu Kaalai (1980)

The soundtrack to the 1980 Tamil-language psychological thriller film Moodu Pani directed by Balu Mahendra, features four songs composed by Ilaiyaraaja, in his 100th film as a music director, and lyrics written by his brother Gangai Amaran and Viji Manuel. The film also marked Ilaiyaraaja's first collaboration with Mahendra who would later work in all of his films. The album was released under the label EMI Records.

Unlike Ilaiyaraaja's previous films, the soundtrack to Moodu Pani had lesser number of songs. The film was noted for Ilaiyaraaja's first association with A. R. Rahman, who worked as a keyboard programmer in the film's score, and would later become one of the most sought-out composers in Indian cinema.

The album was first issued in a double LP record that consisted only three songs, while the second edition which released in 1981, features all the four songs as heard in the film. Upon release, the song "Yen Iniya Pon Nilave" became highly popular, which led several singers to perform their own renditions in the early 21st century, and also becoming one of the best songs of Ilaiyaraaja and K. J. Yesudas, who performed the song.

== Background and development ==
Moodu Pani is the beginning of a collaboration between Mahendra and Ilaiyaraaja, which continued till the former's last film Thalaimuraigal (2013) that released before his death in February 2014. Mahendra decided to bring Ilaiyaraaja on board, after he planned to do the same for his maiden Tamil film, Azhiyatha Kolangal (1979), but Salil Chowdhury who worked in the former's debut directorial Kokila (1977) was recruited after his interest on working in a Tamil film. While scripting Moodu Pani, Mahendra eventually approached Ilaiyaraaja for composing the film, which he agreed to do so. In an interview to The Hindu in 2007, he recalled: "When I first met [Ilaiyaraaja] I explained him what my kind of movie is and what I expect from him. The background score should allow meaningful silences in my films. I believe silence conveys more than words or music".

Moodu Pani also marked Rahman's first association with Ilaiyaraaja, with Rahman (then known by his birth name Dilip) who was 13 years old then, worked as a keyboard programmer in the film. During the scoring sessions, Ilaiyaraaja fired his old keyboard programmer, due to the person's drinking behaviour. At that time, one of his troupe members asked Ilaiyaraaja to meet a boy named Dilip, who was already doing keyboard programming for Malayalam films. Ilaiyaraaja agreed and sent for Dilip, whom he instructed regarding the notes and tune he had to play. Dilip successfully completed the background score under Ilaiyaraaja's supervision.

Mahendra wanted a song that depicts Chandru playing the guitar and asked Ilaiyaraaja for a tune; he played the scratch notes of the song that would become "Ilaya Nila", (Note: "Ilaya Nila" was later used in the 1982 film Payanangal Mudivathillai.) but Mahendra was unsatisfied and asked for another tune. He then gave him the tune of "Yen Iniya Pon Nilavae", and this was retained. The song was written by Ilaiyaraaja's brother Gangai Amaran in January 1980, and sung by K. J. Yesudas. According to Amaran, it was one of the hardest songs in the album to write. "Yen Iniya Pon Nilavae" and "Paruva Kaalangalin" were set in Natabhairavi raga.

According to A. S. Panneerselvan of Frontline, the dominant genre of the music used in Moodu Pani was "modern jazz with a sprinkling of avant-garde elements." Gangai Amaran wrote two songs for the album, except for the English-language number "Sing Swing" (also known as "Swing Swing") which was written by Viji Manuel. (Note: In the first soundtrack edition, he was credited as Vijay Samuel, and in the second, as Vijay Manuel) The lyricist of "Aasai Raja", is not credited, albeit Gangai Amaran wrote that number.

== Release ==
The soundtrack was distributed by EMI as a double album in 1980. The first side of the LP record featured "Yen Iniya Pon Nilavae", and the second side features "Paruva Kaalangalin" and "Sing Swing". "Aasai Raja" was not included in the album. However, another edition of the soundtrack was published in 1981, with "Aasai Raja" on the second side, and "Paruva Kaalangalin" on the first.

== Reception and legacy ==
Ilaiyaraaja's music and the inclusion of less songs in the film were highlighted by critics as the positive aspects of the film, by Ananda Vikatan and Kalki. The song "Yen Iniya Pon Nilavae" in particular was a huge hit. The FM radio station Radio City hosted a special show titled Raja Rajathan where Ilaiyaraaja's songs were broadcast for 91 days, beginning from early March 2015 to 2 June 2015, coinciding with Ilaiyaraaja's 72nd birthday; "Yen Iniya Pon Nilave" as one of the most-requested songs on the show.

Pratap Pothen recalled in an interview to The Hindu, despite Yesudas and Mahendra being associated, people are reminded of his character when the song "Yen Iniya Pon Nilave" comes to mind. He added "Balu Mahendra made me listen to this song for the first time in Chola Sheraton. I learned just then that he got married to Shoba. I told him that this song was so beautiful, that it was a great wedding gift for him from Ilaiyaraaja." In Vaaranam Aayiram (2008), when Suriya's character sees Sameera Reddy's character and falls in love with her, he takes his guitar and performs "Yen Iniya Pon Nilavae". Pratap said he "enjoyed" Suriya's rendition of the song. In Pratap's posthumous film Coffee With Kadhal (2022), his character performs the song at a bonfire party with Jiiva, Jai and Srikanth. In an interview with internet personality Madan Gowri for Star Sports Tamil, Australian cricketer Shane Watson performed the song on guitar to express his special talents beside being a cricket player.

== Other versions ==
Ilaiyaraaja incorporated elements of "Yen Iniya Pon Nilavae" in his song "Baatein Hawa" from Cheeni Kum (2007), which itself was adapted from "Kuzhal Oodhum Kannanukku" from Mella Thirandhathu Kadhavu (1983). (Note: M. S. Viswanathan composed the track (and all songs from the film) while Ilaiyaraaja did the arrangements) The album of Cheeni Kum itself featured tunes that were adapted from Ilaiyaraaja's previous ventures, however, being freshly arranged; which includes "Mandram Vandha" from Mouna Ragam (1986) being incorporated into the title track and "Sooni Sooni". A remix of "Yen Iniya Pon Nilavae" is featured on artist M. Rafi's album Aasaiyae Alaipolae. Another remix version of "En Iniya Pon Nilave" was composed by Ilaiyaraaja's son Yuvan Shankar Raja into a duet for the film Aghathiyaa (2025) with vocals performed by Yesudas's son Vijay Yesudas along with Priya Jearson.

== Stage performances ==
"Yen Iniya Pon Nilave" was performed by several artists during the early 21st century. In 2006, Yesudas performed the song during a programme held at PSG College of Technology, organised by Helpline Arts Academy to sponsor the education of underprivileged children in and around Coimbatore. In March 2010, singer Vijay Prakash performed the track as part of a medley, at the Star Vijay music show "Kaadhal Unplugged". and Srinivas performed the song live the following year in a concert organised by Rotary Coimbatore Central. Super Singer contestant Ajesh, performed it at the Puthuyugam TV music show "Yugam Unplugged" in March 2014. In June 2014, during Ilaiyaraaja's 71st birthday, singers Shweta Mohan and Aalap Raju collaborated for a video in which they performed some of Ilaiyaraaja's songs as a tribute to him, with "Yen Iniya Pon Nilavae" being one of them.

== Track listing ==
No.	Title	Lyrics	Singer(s)	Length
1.	"Yen Iniya Pon Nilavae"	Gangai Amaran	K. J. Yesudas	4:10
2.	"Paruva Kaalangalin"	Gangai Amaran	Malaysia Vasudevan, S. Janaki	3:00
3.	"Sing Swing"	Viji Manuel	Kalyan	4:57
4.	"Aasai Raja"	Gangai Amaran	Uma Ramanan	1:04
