= Sherin Shringar =

Indian actress

- Born: Sherin Shringar
- Occupation: Actress
- Years active: 2002–present
- Awards: Cinema Express Award for Most Popular Actress 2003

Sherin Shringar, known by her stage name Sherin or Shirin is an Indian actress, who has appeared in Tamil, Kannada, Malayalam and Telugu-language films. After making her debut in the Tamil film Thulluvadho Ilamai (2002), she starred in films such as Whistle (2003). In 2019, Sherin participated in Bigg Boss 3 and emerged as the 3rd runner up.

== Career ==
Sherin won critical acclaim and box office success through her debut Tamil film, Kasthuri Raja's coming-of-age drama Thulluvadho Ilamai (2002). Starring opposite Dhanush in his acting debut, the film garnered publicity prior to release for its music by Yuvan Shankar Raja and its adult story written by Selvaraghavan. It subsequently became a commercial success at the box office, effectively launching the careers of Sherin and Dhanush. The actress won the Cinema Express Award for Most Popular Actress for her performance, while she later went on to star in the Telugu remake titled Juniors (2003).

Shringar made her debut as an actress in Kannada films through Police Dog (2002) before playing a lead role in Dhruva (2002), in which she starred alongside Darshan. She then appeared in supporting roles alongside senior actresses Ramya Krishnan in Jaya (2002) and Simran in Kovilpatti Veeralakshmi (2003), and also garnered attention for her negative role in the horror film Whistle (2003) and her role opposite debutant Sibi Sathyaraj in Student Number 1 (2003). Sherin later moved on to work on Telugu and Malayalam films, appearing in Krishna Vamsi's thriller drama Danger (2005).

In the late 2000s, Sherin's offers as a leading actress began to decrease, and several films she had starred in were subsequently delayed or shelved. A return to Kannada films with Bhoopathi and the Tamil action drama Urchagam (2007), both fared badly at the box office. A six-film contract with SPR Productions did not materialise as expected, while Cash and Maya with Shaam and the S. J. Surya-starrer Vil were dropped midway through production. She notably appeared in an item song in Linguswamy's Bheema (2008) alongside Vikram and in R. Ananth Raju's Mast Maja Maadi (2008) alongside Upendra and eleven other actresses. She portrayed a role with negative shades in the Kannada film Yogi (2009). Other films including the Kannada film Sihigali and the Tamil film Poova Thalaiya, had delayed low-key releases in 2010. Sherin subsequently chose to take a career sabbatical in the late 2000s, and briefly took up a course in Art and Culture in Sydney.

She made a return to Kannada films through Om Prakash Rao's AK 56 (2012) alongside Siddhanth, which garnered a good commercial response. Her next release, the comedy drama Nanbenda (2015), saw her appear in a supporting role, where she was paired opposite comedian Santhanam. In 2019, she took part as a contestant in the Tamil reality television show, Bigg Boss Tamil 3.

== Filmography ==
=== Film ===
Key
†	Denotes films that have not yet been released

Year	Title	Role	Language	Notes
2002	Thulluvadho Ilamai	Pooja	Tamil	
2002	Police Dog	Rekha	Kannada	
2002	Dhruva	Rashmi	Kannada	
2002	Jaya	Preethi	Tamil	
2003	Juniors	Pooja	Telugu	
2003	Student Number 1	Anjali	Tamil	
2003	Whistle	Maaya (Naga)	Tamil	
2003	Kovilpatti Veeralakshmi	Seetha	Tamil	
2005	Danger	Radhika Reddy	Telugu	
2006	Moonnamathoral	Raheel	Malayalam	
2007	Bhoopathi	Isiri	Kannada	
2007	Urchagam	Jency	Tamil	
2007	Hareendran Oru Nishkalankan	Pooja Vasudevan	Malayalam	
2008	Bheemaa	Rangamma	Tamil	Special appearances
2008	Mast Maja Maadi	Herself	Kannada	Special appearances
2009	Yogi	Paddu	Kannada	
2010	Sihigaali	Jeevi	Kannada	
2011	Poova Thalaiya	Eashwari	Tamil	
2012	AK 56	Sindhu	Kannada	
2015	Nanbenda	Preethi	Tamil	
2024	Dhil Raja	Arnanti	Tamil	

=== Television ===
List of Sherin Shringar television credits
Year	Show	Role	Channel	Language	Notes
2019	Bigg Boss 3	Contestant	Star Vijay	Tamil	3rd runner-up
2019	Bigg Boss Season 3 Kondattam	Herself	Star Vijay	Tamil	Special show
2020	Dancing Super Stars	Judge	Star Vijay	Tamil	
2020	Bigg Boss 4	Guest	Star Vijay	Tamil	Through Virtual Meet and physical appearance in Finale
2023	Cooku with Comali (season 4)	Contestant	Star Vijay	Tamil	Eliminated
