= Thunai Mudhalvar =

2015 Indian film by R. Vivekanandan

- Theatrical release poster
- Directed by: R. Vivekanandan
- Written by: K. Bhagyaraj
- Produced by: R. Shankar; K. G. Suresh Babu
- Starring: K. Bhagyaraj; Jayaram; Shwetha Menon; Sandhya
- Cinematography: A. Karthik Raaja
- Edited by: S. M. V. Subbu
- Music by: Songs: Jai; Balaji; Pradeep; Score: Harish-Jai
- Production company: Anugrahada Art Films
- Distributed by: Dream Factory
- Release date: 10 April 2015
- Running time: 153 minutes
- Country: India
- Language: Tamil

Thunai Mudhalvar (transl. Deputy Chief minister) is a 2015 Indian Tamil-language political satire film written by K. Bhagyaraj and directed by R. Vivekanandan. It stars Bhagyaraj and Jayaram in the lead roles while Shwetha Menon, and Sandhya among others form an ensemble cast. The film was released on 10 April 2015.

== Cast ==
- K. Bhagyaraj as Periya Pandi
- Jayaram as Chinna Paandi
- Sandhya as Rukmani
- Shwetha Menon as Thangam
- Junior Balaiah
- Tarun Kumar
- Mohan Raman
- Kovai Senthil
- Nellai Siva
- Manobala
- T. P. Gajendran
- Ranganathan
- Sembuli Jagan
- Gowtham (Vijith)
- Koshr

== Production ==
During the audio launch of Bharathiraja's Annakkodi (2013) in January 2013, Bhagyaraj announced that he was working a script titled Thunai Mudhalvar Unopposed and that he was finalising the cast for the project. The film was launched in December 2013, with Jayaram signed on to appear alongside Bhagyaraj in the lead roles, while newcomer Vivekanandan would handle the film's direction. Shwetha Menon was also signed on, marking her fourth film in the Tamil film industry, and the team began shoot in Pollachi. Bhagyaraj ghost-directed the film, often changing the script and dialogues on location.

== Soundtrack ==
The music was composed by Jai, Balaji, and Pradeep.

Track listing
No.	Title	Singer(s)	Length
1.	"Aiyoo Aiyoo"	Prasanna, Chinmayi
2.	"Dhinam Dhinam"	Rohit, Chinmayi
3.	"Kaasu Veesina"	Rita, Surmukhi Raman
4.	"Kerala Chechiyallo"	Anuradha Sriram

== Reception ==
Sudhir Srinivasan from The Hindu noted that it "is an outdated film that verges on the obscene" and that "its plot, its setting, its pace, its depiction of women — is dated". Likewise, M Sugnath from The Times of India noted "the whole enterprise feels like some badly made TV serial", particularly criticising the film's depiction of women. Malini Mannath of The New Indian Express wrote, "Meant to be a breezy satire on modern day politics, and with Bhagyaraj scripting it, one expected it would be an interesting film. But the script lacks the punch and fritz, the genuinely good moments few and far between". A critic from Kalki wrote that although the core of the story is old, Bhagyaraj has incorporated recent political situations into it and has crafted the screenplay in a lively manner with romance, sentiment, intelligence and anticipation of what will happen next that is typical of him.
