= Jaya (film) =

- Poster
- Directed by: Ratnaraj-Kalanathan
- Written by: Amudha Durairaj
- Produced by: R.C. Venkatadri
- Starring: Ramya Krishnan; Sherin; Karunas; Sriman; Manorama
- Cinematography: K. V. Mani
- Edited by: Sunil Kumar; V. T. Vijayan (Supervision)
- Music by: Bharani
- Production companies: Ratna Films; Deivanai Movies
- Release date: 6 December 2002
- Country: India
- Language: Tamil

Jaya is a 2002 Indian Tamil-language film directed by the Ratnaraj-Kalanathan duo, starring Ramya Krishnan and Sherin.

== Plot ==
A college student gets murdered and one of her friends starts a hunt for the killers.

== Cast ==
- Ramya Krishnan as Jaya
- Sherin Shringar as Preethi
- Sriman as Balaji
- Manorama
- Karunas as Micheal
- Ramesh Kanna as Ramesh Kanna
- Trilok as Saleem
- Swetha Eswarawaka
- Ambika
- Anu Mohan
- Thalaivasal Vijay
- FEFSI Vijayan
- Kumarimuthu
- Suryakanth
- Madhan Bob
- Vani Viswanath
- Baburaj

== Production ==
A set resembling a college auditorium was erected at a cost of about ₹10 lakh (equivalent to ₹38 lakh or US$45,000 in 2023) at a studio in Chennai. It was a college scene, celebrating International Women's Day, that was shot.

== Soundtrack ==
The music was composed by Bharani.

Song	Singers	Lyrics
Berla Berla	Anuradha Sriram	Kabilan
Gundu Banagara Goli	Manikka Vinayagam	Pa. Vijay
Jinjinna Jinjinna	Sujatha, Sumitra	Thamarai
Nilave Nilave	K. S. Chithra	Thamarai
Tension Tension	Anuradha Sriram	Newton
Velli Kolusu Mani	Srinivas	Palani Bharathi

== Reception ==
Malathi Rangarajan of The Hindu wrote, "WHAT COULD have been a thrilling action-packed film ends a damp squib, thanks to insipid treatment". Malini Mannath of Chennai Online wrote, "The screenplay has many loopholes, scenes are carelessly joined together, the director quite forgetting what he had depicted in his earlier scenes. The rest of the cast too hardly get any scenes to impress. 'Jaya' is a disappointing fare". Sify called it "an intolerable film that lacks any sense or logic".
