= Preethiyinda Ramesh =

- Directed by: Gunakumar
- Written by: Gunakumar
- Based on: You've Got Mail (1998)
- Produced by: N. Ravikumar
- Starring: Ramesh Aravind; Ramnitu Chaudhary; Suma Guha; Kiran Srinivas
- Cinematography: A. C. Mahendran
- Edited by: R. Dorairaj
- Music by: A. T. Raveesh
- Production company: Shantha Enterprises
- Release date: 14 May 2010
- Running time: 140 minutes
- Country: India
- Language: Kannada

Preethiyinda Ramesh (transl. With love, Ramesh) is a 2010 Indian Kannada language romantic comedy film directed by Gunakumar and produced by N. Ravikumar. The film stars Ramesh Aravind, Ramnitu Chaudhary and Suma Guha in pivotal roles. The story is inspired by the Hollywood film, You've Got Mail (1998) directed by Nora Ephron and starred Tom Hanks and Meg Ryan.

== Cast ==
- Ramesh Aravind as Ramesh / Arvind
- Ramanithu Chaudhary as Pari / Preethi
- Suma Guha
- Kiran Srinivas
- Ranjitha
- Prithviraj
- Sadashiva Brahmavar

== Soundtrack ==
All the songs are composed and scored by A. T. Raveesh. The track list consists of 5 songs.

Sl No	Song title	Singer(s)	Lyrics
1	"Horadi"	Chaitra H. G.	Shivananjappa Gowda
2	"Computer"	Avinash Chebbi	V. Nagendra Prasad
3	"Anguli"	A. T. Raveesh, Malgudi Subha	Vidya Kiran
4	"Nenapina Aleyali"	Vijay Prakash	K. Kalyan
5	"Something Something"	Rajesh Krishnan, Priyadarshini	K. Kalyan

== Reception ==
A critic from The Times of India scored the film at 4 out of 5 stars and says "Ramesh Aravind marvels with expressions and dialogue delivery. Ramanitho is brilliant. Kiran and Suma Guha shine. Camera work by A C Mahender and music by A T Ravish are excellent". BSS from Deccan Herald wrote "A T Raveesh’s compositions and A C Mahendran’s camerawork complement each other. “Preethiyinda Ramesh” fails to wake up viewers jaded by mindless fare". Shruti Indira Lakshminarayana from Rediff.com scored the film at 1.5 out of 5 stars and wrote "This being a film about new age love story, the approach could have been more presentable. Cinematography, animation and the special effect bits don't contribute much either. Preeti Inda Ramesh was the name of a hugely popular celebrity chat show hosted by Ramesh for a TV channel. But its namesake film fails to wield the same charm".
