= Yogi (2009 Kannada film) =

- Directed by: Udaya Prakash
- Starring: Yogesh; Bianca Desai; Sherin
- Cinematography: Dasari Srinivas Rao
- Edited by: K M Prakash
- Music by: Emil
- Release date: 30 October 2009
- Country: India
- Language: Kannada

Yogi is a 2009 Indian Kannada-language film directed by Udaya Prakash, starring Yogesh, Bianca Desai and Sherin in the lead roles.

== Cast ==
- Yogesh as Yogi
- Bianca Desai as Mala
- Sherin as Paddu
- Suchendra Prasad as Babu
- Praveen
- Sathish Ninasam as KK's brother
- Gururaj Hosakote
- Rekha Vedavyas in a special appearance

== Music ==
Yogi

Soundtrack album by Emil
- Released: 2009
- Recorded: 2009
- Genre: Feature film soundtrack
- Length: 24:13
- Language: Kannada

Official audio
- Yogi - Full Album on YouTube

Track listing
No.	Title	Singer(s)	Length
1.	"Appu Andre Appune"	Benny Dayal, Karthik, Emil, Jassie Gift	4:09
2.	"Ardambarda Daadi"	Mohammad Aslam, Chaitra H. G., Bhavya	4:42
3.	"Ae Maga"	A. R. Reihana, Emil, Yogesh, Umesh	3:52
4.	"Neenomme Nakresaaku"	Karthik	4:37
5.	"Jogiyaada Yogi"	Sangeetha, Karibasavayya, Sinchana, Aryan, Manaaf	4:29
6.	"Brucelee Vamsha"	Swapna, KK, Yogesh, Emil	3:04
Total length:			24:13

== Reception ==
=== Critical response ===
R G Vijayasarathy of Rediff.com scored the film at 2 out of 5 stars and says "All in all Yogi is just an ordinary and predictable fare that is neither entertaining nor interesting. But for the quality of song compositions and its rich presentation, the film lags behind in every aspect of filmmaking. Except for the climax sequence which is well executed in Golkonda near Hyderabad, all the other fights look extremely ordinary". The Times of India scored the film at 2.5 out of 5 stars and wrote "Yogesh has improved a lot and excels. Biyanka has scope for improvement. Shirin as Paddu wins plaudits for her excellent performance. Suchendra Prasad shines. Emil's music and Dasari Seenu's camerawork are okay". Bangalore Mirror wrote "What Yogi lacks is not a good story but a gripping narrative. The inexperience of first-time director Uday Prakash is evident in this regard".
