= Mast Maja Maadi =

2008 Indian comedy-romance film

- Film Poster
- Directed by: R. Ananth Raju
- Produced by: Soundarya Jagadish
- Starring: Sudeep; Vijay Raghavendra; Diganth; Naga Kiran; Komal; Jennifer Kotwal
- Cinematography: M. R. Seenu
- Edited by: Tirupati Reddy
- Music by: P. B. Balaji
- Production company: Soundarya Namana Creations
- Release date: 12 December 2008
- Running time: 160 minutes
- Country: India
- Language: Kannada

Mast Maja Maadi is a 2008 Indian Kannada comedy-romance film directed by R. Ananth Raju featuring Sudeep, Vijay Raghavendra, Diganth, Naga Kiran, Komal and Jennifer Kotwal in the lead roles. The film features background score and soundtrack composed by P. B. Balaji and lyrics by K. Ram Narayan. It is a remake of the 2007 Hindi film Dhamaal by Indra Kumar, which itself is inspired by Stanley Kramer's It's a Mad, Mad, Mad, Mad World (1963).

== Plot ==
Mast Maja Maadi is the story of four good-for-nothing, unemployed youngsters in search of a treasure hidden somewhere in Ooty’s Botanical Gardens. Apart from them, a cop is also eyeing the treasure. The youngsters’ attempts to get the treasure all to themselves and the hurdles they face in their mission form the crux of the story

== Cast ==
- Sudeep as ACP Pratap
- Vijay Raghavendra as Ramu
- Diganth as Kamesh
- Naga Kiran as Shyam Bhatatei
- Komal as Mylaari
- Jennifer Kotwal as Sahana
- Rangayana Raghu as Somanath Tantri, Kamesh's father
- Umashree as Keerthi Bedi, Police Commissioner
- Sadhu Kokila as Bond DK
- Tennis Krishna
- Sihi Kahi Chandru as Chittoor Chandrababu Rayalaseema Veera Venkata Raghava Rajamandri Channakeshava Lakshmi Narasimha Samarasimha Reddy
- R.N.Sudarshan as Moneylink Shastry
- Nagashekar
- Shankar Rao as College Principal Bekupa - Bedarahalli Kumarappa Son Palakshappa
- Bullet Prakash as Hari Navarathan
- R. Anantharaju
- K. Ram Narayan
- Bangalore Amjad Khan
- Mandeep Roy
- Shantamma

=== Guest roles ===
The following actors and actresses appear as themselves in the song "Shakalaka Bhoom".

- Upendra
- Rekha Vedavyas
- Sharmila Mandre
- Sanjjana
- Sherin
- Gowri Munjal
- Suman Ranganathan
- Ragini Dwivedi
- Aindrita Ray
- Keerthi Chawla

== Soundtrack ==
The music was composed by P. B. Balaji with lyrics by Ram Narayan and released by Akshaya Audio. The song "Chori Chori" is based on "Yaro Yaro" from Inba (2008).

Mast Maja Maadi

Soundtrack album by P. B. Balaji
- Released: 14 November 2008
- Recorded: 2008
- Genre: Soundtrack
- Length: 27:26
- Label: Akshaya Audio
- Producer: P.B. Balaji

Track list
No.	Title	Singer(s)	Length
1.	"Chori Chori"	Karthik, Chinmayi	5:10
2.	"Jhana Jhana Kanchana"	Benny Dayal, Krish, P. B. Balaji, SuVi	6:10
3.	"Ota Ota"	Tippu, Gopal Sharma, P. B. Balaji, Janaki Iyer	4:53
4.	"Ota Ota (Female)"	SuVi	5:08
5.	"Shakalaka Bhoom"	Benny Dayal, Janaki Iyer	6:05
Total length:			27:26

== Reception ==
Bangalore Mirror opined that "Set aside your thinking cap and just enjoy maadi (transl. enjoy it)". R. G. Vijayasarathy of Rediff.com wrote that "Mast Maja Maadi is a timepass film if you like comedy".
