= Masti (2007 film) =

- Directed by: Shivamani
- Written by: Upendra; Jennifer Kotwal
- Produced by: Ramu
- Cinematography: Giri
- Edited by: Shashi Kumar
- Music by: Gurukiran
- Production company: Ramu Enterprises
- Release date: May 7, 2007
- Country: India
- Language: Kannada

Masti is a 2007 Indian Kannada-language romantic drama film directed by Shivamani and starring Upendra and Jennifer Kotwal. The film gathered some controversy for its title from fringe Kannada groups, who felt it was an insult to Masti Venkatesha Iyengar.

== Cast ==
- Upendra as Siddappaji aka Masti
- Jennifer Kotwal
- Shashi Kumar
- Kota Srinivasa Rao
- Ramesh Bhat
- Umashree
- Ponnambalam
- Kishore
- Pavithra Lokesh
- Mico Nagaraj
- Satya Prakash
- Kote Prabhakar
- Sathyajith
- Mansoor Ali Khan
- Sadashiva Brahmavar
- Sadhu Kokila
- Bullet Prakash
- Pavithra Lokesh
- Chitra Shenoy
- Honnavalli Krishna
- M. S. Umesh
- Malavalli Saikrishna
- Mohan Juneja
- Killer Venkatesh

== Soundtrack ==
The music was composed by Gurukiran and released by Jhankar Music.

Masti

Soundtrack album by Gurukiran
- Released: May 4, 2007
- Recorded: 2007
- Genre: Soundtrack
- Length: 29:49
- Label: Jhankar Music
- Producer: Gurukiran

Gurukiran chronology
Pallakki (2007)	Masti (2007)	Santha (2007)

Track list
No.	Title	Lyrics	Singer(s)	Length
1.	"Kannalide"	K. Kalyan	Udit Narayan, Shamitha Malnad	5:26
2.	"Kolumande"	Goturi	Shankar Mahadevan, B. Jayashree	4:31
3.	"Raviye Vandane"	K. Kalyan	K. S. Chithra	3:33
4.	"Ingyake"	Goturi	L. N. Shastri, Nanditha	2:02
5.	"Kamsale Taalke"	Goturi	L. N. Shastri, Sunitha Upadrashta	2:15
6.	"Masti Banda"	V. Nagendra Prasad	J. Anoop Seelin, B. Jayashree, Chaitra Ambadipudi, Gurukiran, Rangaswamy	4:13
7.	"Rama Lakshmana"	Goturi	Baby Hiranmayi, Nanditha	1:52
8.	"Mastire"	K. Kalyan	Malgudi Subha, Sukhwinder Singh	4:44
9.	"Roudravthara"	Hrudaya Shiva	Ravindra Prabhu	1:13
Total length:				29:49

== Reception ==
=== Critical response ===
R. G. Vijayasarathy of IANS wrote that "Masti is a better offering which may be remembered for Upendra's performance and high technical values". A critic from Rediff.com wrote that "The film marks a new innings in Upendra's career. While OM remains one of his best directed films, Masti certainly can be termed as one of his best performances".
