= Parattai Engira Azhagu Sundaram =

- DVD cover
- Directed by: Suresh Krissna
- Written by: Rajkannan (dialogues)
- Screenplay by: A. V. Durai Sahib; Sai Ramani
- Story by: Prem
- Based on: Jogi
- Produced by: Yogesh K R Keyaar
- Starring: Dhanush; Archana; Meera Jasmine
- Cinematography: Velraj
- Edited by: Suraj Kavee
- Music by: Gurukiran
- Production company: KR Infotainment Pvt. Ltd.
- Release date: 27 April 2007
- Running time: 157 minutes
- Country: India
- Language: Tamil

Parattai Engira Azhagu Sundaram (transl. Azhagu Sundaram alias Parattai) is a 2007 Indian Tamil-language crime action film directed by Suresh Krissna. The film stars Dhanush, Archana, and Meera Jasmine. A remake of the 2005 Kannada film Jogi, it revolves around a woman who comes to the city from her village in search of her presumably lost son. The film was released on 27 April 2007 and unlike its original version was a box-office failure.

== Plot ==
Azhagu Sundaram is a village bumpkin who comes from Tirunelveli to Chennai to earn money to buy gold bangles for his beloved mother Meenakshi. He gets entangled in the big bad world of dons and goondas and is unable to get back home to see his mother. On the other hand, Meenakshi lands up in Chennai in search of her son without even knowing his address or whereabouts. Meenakshi bumps into Shwetha, a journalism student who takes pity on her, takes her home, and promises to help her find her son. Azhagu is now known as Parattai in Chennai and is taken under the wings of Khader Bhai, a tea shop owner. Parattai is forced to take the aruval as gang wars erupt and single-handedly, he wipes out Deva, Kesavan and Suri, all dreaded criminals in the city. On parallel lines, he never sees his mother and finally accompanies her dead body to the crematorium, thinking it is an orphan's corpse. He dances with others, offers flowers, and finally after her body is charred, he realises that it was his mother.

== Cast ==
- Dhanush as Azhagu Sundaram (Parattai)
- Archana as Meenakshi, Azhagu Sundaram's mother
- Meera Jasmine as Shwetha
- Nassar as Khader Bhai
- Santhanam as Sannasi/Santosh
- Mumaith Khan as item number ('Nee Rasthali')
- Livingston as Azhagu Sundaram's father
- Ajay Rathnam
- Kadhal Dhandapani as Kesavan
- Adithya as Deva
- K. Natraj
- Manobala
- Riyaz Khan
- Aryan as Suri
- Crane Manohar
- Kadhal Arun Kumar as Chitti
- Monisha Ravishankar as Shwetha's friend
- Vidharth as Parattai's friend (uncredited)

== Production ==
Rajinikanth watched the Kannada film Jogi and liked it. He encouraged his then son-in-law Dhanush to accept to star in its Tamil remake. The film, produced by Keyaar, was titled Parattai Engira Azhagu Sundaram, paying homage to Parattai, a character played by Rajinikanth in 16 Vayathinile (1977). When Rajinikanth initially wanted to portray the lead role, he approached Prem, the director of the original, to direct the remake, but Prem declined as he did not want to pander to the lead actor's popular image at the cost of realism. Dance choreographer Raju Sundaram was selected to direct the film but later he was replaced by Suresh Krissna. Sundaram opted out of the film due to his assignments as choreographer. The film was launched on 31 August 2006 with a puja. Archana agreed to play the mother of Dhanush's character. One of the songs was shot at Senji fort.

== Soundtrack ==
The music was composed by Gurukiran, who retained the soundtrack of Jogi for this version too.

Song	Singer(s)	Lyrics	Duration
"Chikku Bukku"	Karthik, Priya Himesh	Viveka	4:25
"Engeda Azhagundhan"	Tippu, Rita	Na. Muthukumar	5:19
"Adithadi"	Chandran, Vijay Yesudas	Na. Muthukumar	3:59
"Nee Rasthali"	Chandran, Roshini	Pa. Vijay	4:15
"Ezezhu Jenmam"	Mohammed Aslam	Na. Muthukumar	4:59
"Aaru Padai Veedu"	S. P. Balasubrahmanyam	Na. Muthukumar	2:00

== Reception ==
Sify wrote, "Parattai Engira Azhagu Sundaram is a steamy sob story harping on mother-son sentiments' reminding you of 60's tearjerker's laced with lot of violence and Rajnikanth's favourite director Suresh Krishna's presentation and direction is old fashioned, to put it mildly". Sriram Iyer of Rediff wrote, "Director Suresh Krishna has relied on melodrama to make up for the story's deficiencies. Poor performances add to the film's low points". Malathi Rangarajan of The Hindu wrote "`Parattai ... ' is remake of the Kannada `Jogi.' The original was a hit you hear, and that sets you wondering!" Lajjavathi of Kalki praised the acting of Dhanush and Livingston, music and cinematography but felt Krishna's screenplay lacked speed and concluded the suspense of whether mother and child will meet up to a certain point starts to creep up. The director who offered the affection may have added a little ecstasy.
