= Idhaya Vaasal =

- DVD cover
- Directed by: Chandranath
- Screenplay by: Chandranath
- Story by: M. S. Kamlesh Kumar
- Produced by: V. P. S.
- Starring: Ramesh Aravind; Meena
- Cinematography: V. Sukumar
- Edited by: P. Mohanraj
- Music by: Viji Manuel
- Production company: Vasanthalaya Creations
- Release date: 17 May 1991
- Running time: 140 minutes
- Country: India
- Language: Tamil

Idhaya Vaasal (transl. Gate of the Heart) is a 1991 Indian Tamil-language romantic comedy drama film directed by Chandranath. The film stars Ramesh Aravind and Meena, with R. Sarathkumar and Sabitha Anand in supporting roles. It was released on 17 May 1991.

== Plot ==
Aravind is a successful businessman. His brother Murali became a drunkard after his wife divorced him. His father Krishnaswamy felt guilty and gave Aravind total freedom to choose his future wife. Aravind falls in love with Vaani at first sight. He proposes his wish to Vaani's father, but he declines. He has his reason for it: his elder daughter married a rich man, then they were separated. Aravind follows her everywhere despite being beaten and humiliated. Ganesh, an ex-police officer, befriends and helps Aravind. What transpires next forms the rest of the story.

== Cast ==
- Ramesh Aravind as Aravind
- Meena as Vaani
- R. Sarathkumar as Ganesh
- Sabitha Anand as Vaani's sister
- Delhi Ganesh as Vaani's Father
- Uday Prakash
- Goundamani as Balaraman
- Vivek as Joint
- Sethu Vinayagam as Krishnaswamy
- Achamillai Gopi as Murali
- Sangita as Uma
- Pandu
- Raviraj as G. K. Rathnam
- Thideer Kannaiah
- Prathiba
- Vasuki
- Latha
- Baby Sangeetha
- Vijay Ganesh
- Vaishnavi as Indhu in a guest appearance

== Soundtrack ==
The music was composed by Viji Manuel.

Song	Singer(s)	Lyrics	Duration
"En Manampol"	Mano, Malaysia Vasudevan, Arunmozhi	Muthulingam	4:45
"Epothum Kaadhalea"	Deepan Chakravarthy	Muthulingam	3:10
"Kaadhal Jodithan"	K. J. Yesudas	Mu. Metha	4:45
"Kannukkul Unnaithaan"	Mano, K. S. Chithra	Pulamaipithan	4:40
"Vaa Nee Anbe"	S. P. Balasubrahmanyam, Chorus	Muthulingam	4:54

== Reception ==
N. Krishnaswamy of The Indian Express gave the film a mixed review: "One weakness of the script is that there are stories within stories" and adding, "Debutant music director Viji has one catchy number, while the camerawork by V. Sukumar is uniformly good. Kamlesh Kumar's dialogues sparkle at places". C. R. K. of Kalki praised the acting of Ramesh Aravind, Meena and Sarathkumar, humour of Vivek, Pandu and Goundamani.
