= Viji Manuel =

Indian musician

- Born: Vijay Manuel
- Died: 15 August 2015; Chennai
- Occupation: Musician
- Children: 1
- Father: Handel Manuel

Vijay Manuel (1951—15 August 2015) was an Indian musician who worked mainly in Tamil cinema. He was the son of pianist Handel Manuel.

== Early and personal life ==
Vijay "Viji" Manuel was the son of pianist Handel Manuel and soprano singer Alice, who died in 2018. Unlike his classical trained father, Viji was self-taught and formed a rock band "Plastic Glow" and used to play at a hotel at Mussorie where he used to play other instruments if anyone from the band did not show up.

== Career ==
Viji Manuel started his career as bass guitarist for composer Shyam and then went to work for many established composers such as M. S. Viswanathan, K. V. Mahadevan and with Ilaiyaraaja as acoustic guitarist. He also recorded a Christmas album with his father. Manuel composed the music for two films: Idhaya Vaasal and Iravu Sooriyan (both 1991). He stopped composing for further films due to interference from producers and directors, although he composed the score of Thulluvadho Ilamai (2002) at the request of Yuvan Shankar Raja who had to leave for London on an urgent work. His final film where he played keyboard was Kanithan (2016) which was released a year later after his death.

== Personal life ==
Viji Manuel was married, and has a son born in 1974. In the late 2000s, Manuel broke his femur after a slip and fall, and was inactive professionally for almost five years until 2014. He died on 15 August 2015 at the age of 64 due to kidney ailments.

== Discography ==
- Punnagai Mannan (1986) - contributed lyrics for "One Two Three" song
- Idhaya Vaasal (1991)
- Iravu Sooriyan (1991)
- Thulluvadho Ilamai (2002) (score only)
