= Arundathi Nag =

Indian actress, theatre personality

Arundhati Nag
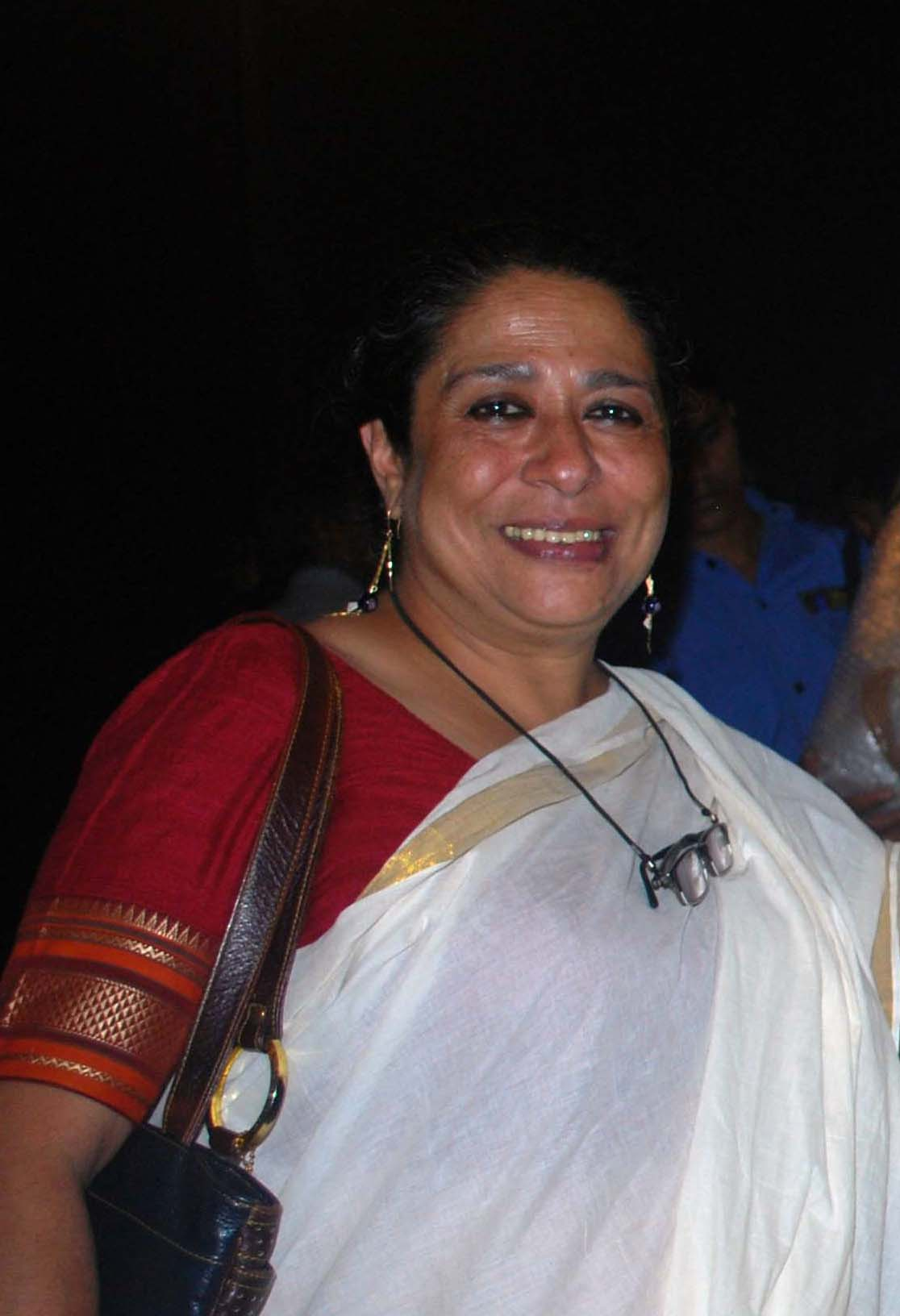
- Arundhati in 2010
- Born: Arundhati Rao; 1955 or 1956 (age 70–71); Delhi, India
- Occupation: Actress
- Years active: 1973–present
- Spouse: Shankar Nag (m. 1980; died 1990)
- Children: 1
- Relatives: Padmavati Rao (sister); C K Mohan Rao (brother); C K Shashank Rao (brother); Ananth Nag (Brother-in-law); Gayatri (actress) (co-sister)

Arundhati Nag (née Rao; born 1955/1956) is an Indian actress. She has been involved with multilingual theatre for over 25 years, first in Mumbai where she got involved with Indian People's Theatre Association (IPTA), and did various productions in Gujarati, Marathi, and Hindi theatre, and then in Kannada, Tamil, Malayalam and English, in Bangalore.

Following her marriage to Kannada actor-director Shankar Nag (1980–1990), her association with theatre continued in Bangalore, where she performed several plays in Kannada: Girish Karnad's Anju Mallige, 27 Mavalli Circle based on the famous play Wait Until Dark, Sandhya Chayya (Jayant Dalvi), Girish Karnad's Nagamandala, and Bertolt Brecht's Mother Courage as Hulaguru Huliyavva. She also worked in several Kannada movies: Accident (1984), Parameshi Prema Prasanga (1984) and Nodiswamy, Navirodu Heege (1987).

Nag built a theatre space in Bangalore: Ranga Shankara. She is a recipient of the Sangeet Natak Akademi Award (2008), the Padma Shri (2010) and the National Film Awards (57th) in 2010.

== Career ==
Nag's career spans over 40 years of theatre, film and television. She is the founder and the Managing Trustee of the Sanket Trust, established in 1992, which runs Ranga Shankara, a theatre space in Bangalore.

The annual Ranga Shankara Theatre Festival, now in its twelfth year, has become a regular feature on Bangalore's cultural calendar.

Nag continues to be actively involved in theatre: her most recent works include Girish Karnad's "Bikhre Bimb" (Hindi) and "Odakalu Bimba" (Kannada).

Her last major movie was The Man Who Knew Infinity (2016), in which she played the mother of the mathematical wizard Ramanujan. She has also appeared in Hindi movies including Paa (2009), "Sapnay" (1997) and "Dil Se" (1998), Kannada movies including Golibar (1991), Jogi (2005) and "Andar Bahar", and Malayalam Da Thadiya (2012) and Drama (2018 film)

== Personal life ==
Nag was born in 1956 in Delhi, stayed in Netaji Nagar. Her family moved to Mumbai when she was 10. At 17, she met Shankar Nag, also a theatre artist. Six years later, the two got married and moved to Bangalore. Shankar became a well-known film actor, and later a director, most remembered for his TV adaptation of R. K. Narayan's Malgudi Days (1987). They had a daughter together, Kaavya.

In 1990, Shankar died in a car accident. Arundhati continued to act in theatre, and began to work towards realising her dream of a theatre space, which in 2004, finally materialised into Ranga Shankara, which is today one of India's premier venues for theatre.

== Filmography ==
=== Actor ===
Year	Film	Role	Language	Notes
1979	22 June 1897		Marathi	
1983	Nodi Swamy Navirodu Hige	Jaya	Kannada	
1984	Accident	Maya Rani	Kannada	Karnataka State Film Award for Best Supporting Actress
1985	Parameshi Prema Prasanga	Ramamani	Kannada	
1985	Poi Mugangal		Tamil	
1993	Golibar	Bharathi Devi	Kannada	
1996	Shiva Sainya	Shiva's mentor	Kannada	
1997	Minsaara Kanavu	Mother Superior	Tamil	
1998	Dil Se..	AIR station director	Hindi	
2003	Ek Alag Mausam	Aparna's mother	Hindi	
2005	Jogi	Bhagyakka	Kannada	Karnataka State Film Award for Best Supporting Actress
2007	Chaurahen	Nandakumar Nair	Hindi	
2009	Paa	Bhumi "Bum" Bharadwa	Hindi	National Film Award for Best Supporting Actress
2012	Da Thadiya	"Knight Rider"	Malayalam	
2013	Andhar Bahar		Kannada	
2016	The Man Who Knew Infinity	Srinivasa Ramanujan's mother	English	
2018	Drama	Rosamma John Chacko	Malayalam	
2022	Escaype Live	Lakshmi Amma	Hindi	Webseries
2022	Medium Spicy	Nissim's aunt and author	Marathi	

=== Assistant director ===
- A Passage to India (1984)
- Indian Summer (1987)

== Awards ==
- 2003: Won: Radio City Woman of the Year
- 2008: Won: Sangeet Natak Akademi Award – Theatre, Acting
- 2009: Won: 57th National Film Award for Best Supporting Actress – Paa
- 2010: Awarded: Padma Shri Award
