= Ugadi (2007 film) =

- Directed by: Om Sai Prakash
- Written by: Dasaradh
- Produced by: A Ganesh; J Narayan
- Starring: V. Ravichandran; Meka Srikanth; Kamna Jethmalani; Jennifer Kotwal
- Cinematography: H. C. Venu
- Edited by: Muniraj
- Music by: R. P. Patnaik
- Production company: Mega Hit Productions
- Release date: 6 July 2007
- Running time: 144 minutes
- Country: India
- Language: Kannada

Ugadi is a 2007 Indian Kannada-language romantic drama film directed by Om Sai Prakash and produced by Mega Hit Productions. The film stars V. Ravichandran, Srikanth, Kamna Jethmalani and Jennifer Kotwal. The film is a remake of the successful Telugu film Santosham (2002) directed by Dasaradh and starring Nagarjuna and Prabhudeva.

The film was released on 6 August 2007 to average response.

== Cast ==
- V. Ravichandran as Sanjay
- Kamna Jethmalani as Kaveri
- Jennifer Kotwal as Priya
- Srikanth as Arjun
- Srinivasa Murthy
- Vinaya Prasad
- Ramakrishna
- Rangayana Raghu
- Vijay Kashi
- Bullet Prakash
- Sadhu Kokila
- Sathyajith
- Chitra Shenoy

== Soundtrack ==
The music of the film was composed by R. P. Patnaik and lyrics written by K. Kalyan except for one song. Patnaik used the tunes from the original Telugu version which he had composed in 2002.

Ugadi

Soundtrack album by R. P. Patnaik
- Released: 2007
- Genre: Feature film soundtrack
- Label: Jhankar Music

No.	Title	Lyrics	Singer(s)	Length
1.	"So Much to Say"	K. Kalyan	Rajesh Krishnan	1:29
2.	"Devare Dharegiliyali"	K. Kalyan	S. P. Balasubrahmanyam, Nanditha	3:38
3.	"Diri Diri Vaare"	K. Kalyan	Rajesh Krishnan, Nanditha	4:10
4.	"Preethisuve Ninna"	K. Kalyan	Rajesh Krishnan, K. S. Chithra	5:10
5.	"Preethi Endare"	K. Kalyan	K. S. Chithra	1:40
6.	"Enayito Nanna Olage"	K. Kalyan	Rajesh Krishnan	1:29
7.	"Dhin Dhinak"	Kaviraj	Shankar Mahadevan	4:14
8.	"Naa Nannagenu"	K. Kalyan	K. S. Chithra	5:19

== Release and reception ==
The film released on 6 July 2007 to average response where the critics called it as an "ordinary" remake and "the only redeeming factor of this film is the last 20 minutes of the film". Nowrunning.com reviewed the film as "just another remake which does not raise above the ordinary levels and certainly does not reach the standards of its original film". Sify wrote "Director Saiprakash seems to have lost interest half way through making this remake of the hit Telugu film 'Santosham'. First and foremost the casting could have been better and the unnecessary comedy mars the tempo. And the basic story resembles Ravichandran's own film 'Ondagona Baa'". Ironically, the film which itself was a remake from Telugu, was later dubbed again in Telugu language and released as America Alludu (2011).

== External source ==
- Sify reviews Ugadi
- Indiaglitz reviews Ugadi
