= Thulluvadho Ilamai =

2002 film by Kasthuri Raja

- Theatrical release poster
- Directed by: Kasthuri Raja (Note: Though Kasthuri Raja is credited as director, reports have indicated Selvaraghavan shot a majority of the film.)
- Screenplay by: Selvaraghavan
- Story by: Kasthuri Raja
- Produced by: M. Ramakrishnan
- Starring: Dhanush; Sherin; Abhinay; Ramesh; Shilpa; Gangeshwari
- Cinematography: Ashok Rajan; Arvind Krishna
- Edited by: Suresh Urs
- Music by: Score: Viji Manuel; Songs: Yuvan Shankar Raja
- Production company: Karthik Cine Visions
- Distributed by: Movie Magic Films
- Release date: 10 May 2002
- Running time: 144 minutes
- Country: India
- Language: Tamil

Thulluvadho Ilamai (transl. Exuberance of Youth) is a 2002 Indian Tamil-language teen drama film written by Selvaraghavan, with direction credited to his father Kasthuri Raja. The film marks the acting debut of Selvaraghavan's younger brother Dhanush, who plays the lead role. It also stars newcomers Abhinay, Sherin, Ramesh, Shilpa and Gangeshwari, while prominent film personalities Vijayakumar, Ramesh Khanna, and Pyramid Natarajan play supporting roles. The film depicts the story of six high-school classmates coming from different strata of society, who have each their own problems in their respective families and escape from their homes, deciding to live together on their own with the help of an older friend of theirs.

While the soundtrack was composed by Yuvan Shankar Raja, Viji Manuel composed the score. The film, which began production in September 2000, was released on 10 May 2002 and became a sleeper hit. It was remade in Telugu as Juniors (2003) with Sherin reprising her role.

== Plot ==
Mahesh is the son of a fisherman. He grows up seeing his parents always having sex or quarrelling. Pooja is the daughter of an orthodox and strict businessman who is always suspicious of her. Vishnu's father neglects his mother and instead has his maid as his paramour. Anitha's parents live abroad, focusing on their work and business, having no time for their daughter and always neglecting her. Harish is regularly beaten up and mistreated by his sadistic father. These five people, and another girl named Divya, are high school students and best friends. When they find out that Anitha is addicted to drugs, they decide to run away from their homes along with Mani, a pavement bookseller and an older friend of theirs, to rehabilitate her, but also as a result of their discontent and feeling of alienation from their respective families.

However, the friends' attempts are a waste. They struggle to survive in the outside world. Being young and immature, their daily life becomes hell. They reside in a hotel and are caught by the police, who mistake them for doing illicit activities. Rescued by Mani, they roam the streets and seek shelter in abandoned places. They try to make money for themselves after the inspector takes the cash they brought. Contacting their parents makes their situation worse. All of them realise that their parents do not care about them at all and would not even bother to worry if they were dead. Feeling disappointed, they continue on their journey. Pooja and Mahesh, at a stage, get intimate, much to Divya's shock. When she questions Harish and scolds Divya, neither of them says a word. Vishnu soon realises that the remaining money he had gone missing, and Anitha is also nowhere to be found. Suspecting her to have been going behind drugs, they start looking for her. Late at night, Vishnu, Mani, and Mahesh go looking for Anitha while Pooja and Divya stay with Harish.

The friends spot Anitha being brought by a man to be sold as a prostitute. Harish fights them, only to get stabbed. Realising that they have no other way to survive safely in this world, they decide to return home. They finally return to their school, where the principal lectures the students' parents, blaming them for the students' escape attempt and misbehavior. Hearing the principal's words and her father scolding her, Pooja consumes an unnamed acid from her school lab. Upon hearing this, Mahesh jumps from the second floor. Both are rushed to the hospital and survive. Ignoring the parents, the rest of their classmates get into the ICU to meet them. Happy that they are safe, they start laughing and mocking each other. The principal tells the parents that they are not worried about what happened and are happy. Feeling ashamed, the parents leave the children alone.

All these events are told in a flashback where Mahesh, now in the military, returns to his school and recalls his memories. He has not disturbed Pooja since then and does not know where his friends are now. Assuring himself that they would have been well off as he is now, he gets interrupted by the principal, but the latter does not recognise Mahesh and walks off. Mahesh believes the principal does not remember him because the latter would have seen many students in these years.

== Cast ==
- Dhanush as Mahesh
- Sherin Shringar as Pooja
- Abhinay as Vishnu
- Ramesh as Harish
- Shilpa as Anitha
- Gangeshwari as Divya
- Ramesh Khanna as Mani
- Vijayakumar as School Principal
- Thalaivasal Vijay as Mahesh's father
- Pyramid Natarajan as Pooja's father
- Ishari K. Ganesh as Police Inspector
- Lollu Sabha Seshu
- Dhanusha Murugasan as Kavitha
- Ashok Raja in a special appearance in the song "Kaatrukku Kaatrukku"

== Production ==
Selvaraghavan, son of director Kasthuri Raja, had written the script. When his family faced financial pressures in the early 2000s with his father out of work, and subsequently, they decided to put their remaining earnings into the film. The film began production during September 2000. It was the debut film of Selvaraghavan's younger brother Dhanush. According to Thiagarajan, his son Prashanth was the original choice for Dhanush's role, but refused as he found it unsuitable due to his age. Cinematographer Arvind Krishna shot 70% of the film but left due to personal issues.

Post-filming, the producers found it difficult to find a distributor. Director R. Madhesh later purchased and released the film. Post-release, Selvaraghavan stated that he had also directed the film but was forced to credit his more established filmmaker father as the sole director, to help the project find a distributor. Magizh Thirumeni, who worked as an assistant director, backed this claim, saying Kasthuri Raja spent two weeks directing the film, but later handed over direction to Selvaraghavan due to his dissatisfaction with the output, and feeling "teenage angst" was not his comfort zone.

== Music ==
The soundtrack was composed by Yuvan Shankar Raja, marking the first collaboration of the Yuvan-Selvaraghavan duo, which would later go on to become one of the most successful combos in Tamil cinema. Viji Manuel composed the film score at Yuvan's request who had to leave for London on an urgent work. The soundtrack initially featured 7 songs overall; later a second CD was released which included 3 additional short tracks. The song "Theenda Theenda", based on the Carnatic raga Reetigowla, had two versions, a female solo and a duet version. The lyrics were written by Pa. Vijay except one song written by Selvaraghavan. The audio rights were acquired by Star Music India and Saregama.

All lyrics are written by Pa. Vijay, except the track "Kann Munney" which was written by Selvaraghavan.

First release
No.	Title	Singer(s)	Length
1.	"Idhu Kaadhala"	Yuvan Shankar Raja	4:32
2.	"Theenda Theenda" (Duet)	P. Unnikrishnan, Bombay Jayashri	5:21
3.	"Kann Munney"	Yuvan Shankar Raja, Timmy	6:01
4.	"Vayadhu Vaa Vaa"	Srinivas, Harini	4:28
5.	"Neruppu Koothadikudhu"	Venkat Prabhu, Chitra Sivaraman	5:10
6.	"Theenda Theenda" (Solo)	Bombay Jayashree	5:19
7.	"Kaatrukku Kaatrukku"	Harish Raghavendra, Harini, Febi Mani, Sunder Rajan	5:57

Second release
No.	Title	Singer(s)	Length
8.	"Theepiditha Kangal"	Bonnie Chakraborty	2:19
9.	"Vaanam Oru"	Yuvan Shankar Raja, Bonnie Chakraborty, Lavanya	2:46
10.	"Theme Music" (Instrumental)	-	1:31

== Release and reception ==
Thulluvadho Ilamai was released on 10 May 2002. Tulika of Rediff.com called the film "an example of moviemaking smarts", adding, "Sitting in a movie theatre watching someone else live out their problems and find solutions, helps". Visual Dasan of Kalki called the film "above average". After taking a small opening, the film began to get teen audiences to cinema halls for its adolescent themes. It subsequently went on to become a sleeper hit.

== Legacy ==
The success of the film prompted Kasthuri Raja to launch a film titled Theenda Theenda, inspired by the song from the film, but it was shelved. The film was later remade in Telugu as Juniors (2003), with Sherin reprising her role. The film's success resulted in similar themed films releasing the following year like Kurumbu and Ilasu Pudhusu Ravusu.
