= Aghathiyaa =

2025 film by Pa. Vijay

- Theatrical release poster
- Directed by: Pa. Vijay
- Written by: Pa. Vijay
- Produced by: Ishari K. Ganesh; Aneesh Arjun Dev
- Starring: Jiiva; Arjun Sarja; Raashii Khanna
- Cinematography: Deepak Kumar Padhy
- Edited by: San Lokesh
- Music by: Yuvan Shankar Raja
- Production companies: Vels Film International; Wam India
- Distributed by: PVR Inox Pictures; Cinepolis
- Release date: 28 February 2025
- Running time: 135 minutes
- Country: India
- Language: Tamil

Aghathiyaa: Angels vs Devil is a 2025 Indian Tamil language historical supernatural horror film written and directed Pa. Vijay. The film stars Jiiva in a dual role alongside Arjun Sarja and Raashii Khanna, while Edward Sonnenblick, Matylda Bajer, Redin Kingsley, Shah Ra, Senthil, Radha Ravi, Rohini, Charle, Indraja Shankar and others in supporting roles. It was produced by Ishari K. Ganesh under his Vels Film International banner and co-produced by Aneesh Arjun Dev under Wam India. The film music composed by Yuvan Shankar Raja, with cinematography handled by Deepak Kumar Padhy, and film edited by San Lokesh. The story revolves around a young art director (Jiiva) and his fiancée (Khanna) trapped into a haunted house, which leads them to uncover the old mysteries of 1940.

The project was announced on 2020, but eventually shelved by the production house due to multiple issues. Later in 2023, the project was officially taken over by Vels Film International. After a delay of four years, Aghathiyaa was released by theatrically on 28 February 2025, and received mixed reviews from critics.

== Plot ==
Aghathiyaa starts with an aspiring art director who is excited as he has landed an opportunity to unleash his talent for a movie. However, the film's producer cancels the project due to reasons best known to him, leaving the former dejected and furious. His girlfriend suggests he convert the props and sets he created for the movie into a scary house to attract visitors. Little do they know that a special piano they come across at a garage which they later added to their props collection would change their fortune in different ways. The art director gets the shock of his life when he learns that he is connected to several incidents that happened 80 years ago in Puducherry.

== Cast ==
- Jiiva in a dual role as:
  - Aghathiyan, an art director
  - Nanjilan, a Freedom Fighter
- Arjun Sarja as Siddharthan, a siddha doctor
- Raashii Khanna as Veena, Aghathiyan's fiance (Voice dubbed by Smruthi K)
- Edward Sonnenblick as Edwin Duplex
- Matylda Bajer as Jacqueline Poovizhi, Edwin's sister and Siddharthan's love interest
- Radha Ravi as Seshadri
- Yogi Babu as himself
- Rohini as Anjalai, Aghathiyan's Mother
- Poornima Bhagyaraj as Dr Vaidheeshwari (Cameo appearance)
- Abhirami as Vaidheeshwari, Siddharthan's mother (Cameo appearance)
- Senthil as Rayon, Mansion owner
- Charle as Aghathiyan's father
- Delhi Ganesh as an astrologer
- Nizhalgal Ravi as Umar Abdullah
- VTV Ganesh as himself
- Redin Kingsley as Double Pandi, Aghathiyan's labour
- Shah Ra as Shankar, Aghathiyan's friend
- Guinness Pakru as a house broker
- Abhishek Kumar as Aghathiyan's friend
- Indraja Shankar as Priya, Veena's friend
- Subathini S
- Dr Kriss Venugopal as Kannadi Siddhar
- Revathi Elango
- Daniel Caltagirone as French Dy, a governor
- Preetham as Helen, Edwin's Wife
- TSR Srinivasan as a film producer

== Production ==
=== Development ===
In mid-May 2020, lyricist-turned-director Pa. Vijay announced his third directorial venture titled Methavi with Jiiva, Arjun Sarja, Raashii Khanna in the lead roles. The film was said to be of horror thriller genre and bankrolled by S. Raja of Makkal Arasan Pictures. Although, Pa. Vijay had worked with Yuvan Shankar Raja, Methavi marked the maiden collaboration of Pa. Vijay with Yuvan Shankar Raja in the former's direction. But the project got delayed due to the COVID-19 pandemic and the death a Russian girl playing a crucial role. In late-March 2023, it was announced that Vels Film International have taken up the project and are planning to release, but was eventually shelved.

In late-March 2023, director Pa. Vijay confirmed that he is associating again, thereby retaining most of the cast and crew for a new untitled period drama film. On 7 October 2024, Vels Film International through a first look poster, revealed the titled of the film Aghathiyaa starring Jiiva and Raashii Khanna in the lead roles alongside, Arjun Sarja and Edward Sonnenblick in prominent roles alongside Yogi Babu, VTV Ganesh, Redin Kingsley and others in supporting roles.

The film is produced by Ishari K. Ganesh under his Vels Film International banner and co-produced by Aneesh Arjun Dev under Wam India. The film has music composed by Yuvan Shankar Raja, cinematography handled by Deepak Kumar Padhy, editing by San Lokesh, stunt choreography by K Ganesh and dance choreography by Sridhar.

=== Filming ===
Principal photography was planned to be shot on a set in Ramoji Film City, in Hyderabad and some portions in Ooty and Kodaikanal.

== Music ==
Aghathiyaa

Soundtrack album by Yuvan Shankar Raja
- Genre: Feature film soundtrack
- Language: Tamil
- Label: Divo Music
- Producer: Yuvan Shankar Raja

Yuvan Shankar Raja chronology
Nesippaya (2025)	Aghathiyaa (2025)	Sweetheart! (2025)

Singles from Aghathiyaa
- 1. "Kaatrin Viral" Released: 6 January 2025; 2. "En Iniya Pon Nilave" Released: 10 January 2025; 3. "Semmannu Dhaane" Released: 24 January 2025

The soundtrack and background is scored by Yuvan Shankar Raja. The first single, titled "Kaatrin Viral" was released on 5 January 2025. The second single in Tamil "En Iniya Pon Nilave" originally from Balu Mahendra's Moodu Pani (1980) composed by Ilaiyaraaja and sung by K. J. Yesudas was remixed into a duet and released on 10 January 2025; however, it does not appear in the final cut of the film. The third single "Semmannu Dhaane" released on 24 January 2025.

Tamil
No.	Title	Lyrics	Music	Singer(s)	Length
1.	"Kaatrin Viral"	Pa. Vijay	Yuvan Shankar Raja	Yuvan Shankar Raja	3:29
2.	"En Iniya Pon Nilave"	Gangai Amaran	Ilaiyaraaja, Yuvan Shankar Raja	Vijay Yesudas, Priya Jearson	4:22
3.	"Semmannu Dhaane"	Pa. Vijay	Yuvan Shankar Raja	M. M. Manasi	3:46

Telugu
No.	Title	Lyrics	Music	Singer(s)	Length
1.	"Gaali Ooyalallo"	Shashank Vennelakanti	Yuvan Shankar Raja	Sathyaprakash	3:30
2.	"Naa Hrudayamantha Neevay"	Shashank Vennelakanti	Ilaiyaraaja, Yuvan Shankar Raja	Deepesh Krishnamoorthy, Devu Mathew	4:25
3.	"Nelamma Thalle"	Shashank Vennelakanti	Yuvan Shankar Raja	Devu Mathew	3:49

== Release ==
=== Theatrical ===
Aghathiyaa released in theatres on 28 February 2025 in Tamil, Hindi and Telugu languages.

=== Home media ===
Aghathiyaa began streaming on Sun NXT from 28 March 2025.

== Reception ==
Abhinav Subramanian of The Times of India gave 3/5 stars and wrote "Jiiva continues his streak of timeline-hopping roles (following Black) with sincere commitment, bringing vulnerability and determination to his character. [...]The film reaches its visual zenith in the climactic showdown between Siddha and Duplex—a ten-minute plus spectacle of motion-capture animation and 3D effects that impresses despite the increasingly outlandish plot developments." Anusha Sundar of OTTPlay gave 2/5 stars and wrote "With done to death ideologies like going local is global, Aghathiyaa misses the mark by several miles when it chooses to work only on its visual marvel and easily forgets on script work."

Sanjay Ponnappa of India Today gave 2.5/5 stars and wrote "Outdated melodrama being integrated into scenes repeatedly acts as a constant distraction, instead of being the emotional hook.[...] And the big VFX fight at the end will certainly leave one impressed. And yet an afterthought will linger on: such a lost opportunity!" Kirubhakar Purushothaman of News18 gave 2/5 stars and wrote "On top of such ideological confusion, the film also refuses to make up its mind about its genre. It kicks off as a horror, then moves on to become a period film, and then it ends up becoming a fantasy with a laughable fight sequence that will not hold water even against PS 2 games." Jayabhuvaneshwari of Cinema Express gave 1.5/5 stars and wrote "In its attempt to blend horror, fantasy, history, and action, Aghathiyaa ends up being neither thrilling nor entertaining—just exhausting."
