= Jogi (2005 film) =

- Directed by: Prem
- Written by: Malavalli Saikrishna (dialogues)
- Screenplay by: Prem
- Story by: Prem
- Produced by: P. Krishnaprasad
- Starring: Shiva Rajkumar; Jennifer Kotwal; Arundathi Nag
- Cinematography: M. R. Seenu
- Edited by: Srinivas P. Babu
- Music by: Gurukiran
- Production company: Ashwini Productions
- Release date: 19 August 2005
- Running time: 173 minutes
- Country: India
- Language: Kannada
- Box office: ₹30 crore

Jogi is a 2005 Indian Kannada-language action crime film written and directed by Prem. It stars Shiva Rajkumar, Jennifer Kotwal and Arundathi Nag. The movie released on 19 August 2005. Record box office collection was reported across Karnataka and the movie completed 100 days in more than 61 theaters. The film was noted for its technical prowess, colloquial Kannada dialogue and lyrics. Its story revolves around an old lady who comes to the city from her village in search of her presumably lost son. It was remade in Telugu as Yogi and in Tamil as Parattai Engira Azhagu Sundaram.

Gurukiran scored the music, while director Prem penned lyrics for all the songs. The audio, released by Ashwini Audio, was a critical and commercial success.

== Plot ==
The film is narrated in a non-linear fashion, with the use of several multiple flashbacks. In the opening scene, a dreaded underworld don is brutally hacked to death by unknown assailants. The police arrive at the crime scene and arrest the unknown assailant revealed as the superstar hero of the movie. The murder is revealed to be the handiwork of a novice, Madesha alias Jogi who works in a roadside tea stall.

In the meantime, news about the murder reaches the echelons of the underworld. A rival gang of the slain don bails out Madesha from the lock-up and requests him to be their associate. Madesha rejects their offer and returns to his tea stall. An inquisitive trainee journalist Nivedhitha (Jennifer Kotwal) is eager to know about Madesha and requests an appointment with him. Despite trailing Madesha for several days, she is unable to interview him. Subsequently, she meets an old woman (Arundathi Nag) from a remote village, who has come in search of her lost son. After listening to her story, Nivedhitha assures her that she will locate her son.

In a flashback, it is revealed that the old lady's son is none other than Madesha. Madesha originally hailed from a village called Singanallur near the Male Mahadeshwara Temple and lived with his parents. His father (Ramesh Bhat) earned his living as a Jogi - a wandering minstrel, who went from one household to another and collected alms in return for singing, but is too ill to continue leaving Madesha to work instead. While he is out, his father dies, leaving him and his mother devastated. Enticed by his childhood friend, who flaunts his success, Madesha decides to try his luck in the city.

Jogi's anxious mother comes to the city in search of him. Jogi is convinced by underworld dons that if he takes up arms, it would be easy for him to find his mother. After doing another job for the gang, he learns his mother is in Bengaluru and goes to a newspaper to add a notice. Niveditha and Bhagyakka both arrive at newspaper place at the same time, but they never see each other. Niveditha meets Jogi and tells her his story:

In a flashback, it is told after arriving in the city, he tries to find work in a tea stall. Falsely implicated by the police for a murder, the tea stall owner gets him freed from jail and gives him work at the tea stall. One day, he is told to bring tea to a meeting of gangsters. While handing tea, Jogi drops several bangles for his mother and suspects the gangster stole it. He then begins to fight the gang, and eventually uses a sickle which he uses to kill the don as seen at the beginning of the movie.

Losing faith in finding her son, Bhagyakka meets Madesha's childhood friend, who had met him once in the city. He tells her he can lead her to Madesha, at a local Mahadeshwara temple, where she sits outside. Niveditha as well realises Jogi is Madesha and tries to tell him she has his mother. At the time, however, Jogi and his gang are going to kill a rival group which murdered one of their associates who left a widowed wife and son behind. After completing the deed, Jogi does not go out during the rain, which pours on Bhagyakka and she dies.

The next day, Madesha's friend arranges for her funeral but is arrested before he can complete the rites. Jogi finds the funeral procession of what he thinks is an unclaimed body and performs her funeral rites as an act of charity. When he discovers that he performed the last rites of his mother without realising it, he is completely broken. Gangsters of the gang Jogi decimated, who are about to kill him, also drop arms saying, "Jogi took up arms for his mother, for whom are we fighting?". The movie ends with the title "A feel that never ends."

== Cast ==
- Shiva Rajkumar as Madesha "Jogi"
- Jennifer Kotwal as Nivedhitha
- Arundathi Nag as Bhagyakka, Madesha's mother
- Ramesh Bhat as Madesha's father
- Kishan Shrikanth
- Adi Lokesh as Bidda
- Umesh Punga
- Mico Nagaraj as Kote Siddha
- Raghu Ram as Yogesh
- Sharan Kabbur
- Sai Sunil
- Malavalli Saikrishna
- Neenasam Ashwath as Live band owner
- John
- Patre Nagaraj as Patre
- Gururaj Hosakote as Khadir Chacha
- Dashavara Chandru
- Sanketh Kashi
- Mohan Juneja
- Shiva Manju
- Kuri Rangatheja
- Yathiraj
- Bus Kumar
- Vijay as Prisoner
- Nagashekar
- Manmohan Rai
- Yana Gupta in a cameo in song "Bin Ladennu Nan Maava"
- Danny

== Production ==
In October 2004, Arundathi Nag was signed in to play the mother of Shiva Rajkumar's character in the film. In preparation for the role of a person belonging to the jogi community, she took to Male Mahadeshwara Hills to study their way of living. Filming began in November at Ashwini Digital Studio in Bangalore. The first scene involved Shiva Rajkumar and his real-life parents Rajkumar and Parvathamma Rajkumar. Director Prem clarified that the plot was not similar to Om and that it was "all about feelings". Composer Gurukiran added that Arundathi Nag, who was to play the role of the mother of Shiva's character, had a central role in the film. The team chalked out a 100-day shooting schedule in Bangalore, Mysore and Rajasthan. Jogi was the home production of P. Krishna Prasad, produced under Ashwini Productions. The signing of actresses Yana Gupta and Jennifer Kotwal were made in December that year. It was their first appearances in Kannada-language films.

== Soundtrack ==
Jogi

Soundtrack album by Gurukiran
- Released: 5 August 2005
- Genre: Feature film soundtrack
- Length: 28:21
- Language: Kannada
- Label: Ashwini Audio
- Producer: Gurukiran

Gurukiran chronology
Sye (2005)	Jogi (2005)	Namma Basava (2005)

Gurukiran who scored the film's background music, also composed for its soundtrack. The soundtrack album comprises six tracks, lyrics for which were penned by Prem.

No.	Title	Singer(s)	Length
1.	"Yelumale Malere"	S. P. Balasubrahmanyam	5:05
2.	"Bin Laden"	Sonu Kakkar, Gurukiran	4:20
3.	"Beduvenu Varavannu"	Prem	5:08
4.	"Chuku Buku Railu"	Sunidhi Chauhan, Hariharan, B. Jayashree	4:20
5.	"Hodi Maga"	Vijay Yesudas, Gururaj Hosakote	4:06
6.	"Yello Jogappa"	Sunitha, Shankar Mahadevan	5:22

== Release and reception ==
Jogi was released on 19 August 2005 in 172 cinemas across Karnataka in 72 prints. It was released in 81 prints later, then a record in Kannada cinema, beaten later by Mungaru Male.

Jogi generated tremendous hype, partly due to Shivrajkumar's peculiar hairdo, the music, and the success of director Prem's previous ventures (Kariya and Excuse Me). Nowrunning.com praised the film for its authentic portrayal of the underworld and praised Shivrajkumar and Arundhati Nag's acting. Rediff.com felt that the movie justified its hype, but could have been trimmed further. Indiainfo wrote "Backed with fabulous music by Gurukiran and some wonderful picturisation of songs, Jogi gives exactly what the masses wants - complete entertainment! The songs 'Ello Jogappa Ninna Aramane', 'Hodi Maga' and 'Bin Laden' were popular even before the release of the film. However, the film lags behind in screenplay. Dialogues are commendable. The film has a very 'realistic' feel to it as the director uses the local Kannada language and also unfolds the various aspects of rowdism. Cinematography by Seenu is another plus point. Overall, a movie you wouldn't mind shelling off some money".

The film was a commercial success. It collected ₹3 crore in one month from release. The movie was reported to have grossed ₹4 crores from single theatre - Kapaali in Majestic area, where the movie completed 25 weeks. While in January 2006, Business Standard reported that the film was expected to collect a lifetime gross of ₹14 crore, in July 2006, a report by The Hindu estimated it to have collected ₹30 crore. The movie was reported to have grossed ₹30 crore by Asianet in 2026.

== Remakes and sequels ==
Jogi was remade in Tamil as Parattai Engira Azhagu Sundaram, and in Telugu as Yogi.

After Jogi's huge success, Prem announced a sequel under his home banner Prem Pictures in 2010. The sequel, Jogayya, was released in 2011.

== Awards ==
2005–06 Karnataka State Film Awards

- Best Actor — Shiva Rajkumar
- Best Supporting Actress — Arundhati Nag
- Best Screenplay — Prem
