= Juniors (film) =

- Poster
- Directed by: J. Pulla Rao
- Written by: Marudhuri Raja (dialogues)
- Screenplay by: J. Pulla Rao
- Story by: Kasthuri Raja
- Based on: Thulluvadho Ilamai (Tamil) by Kasthuri Raja
- Produced by: J. Bhagavan; D. V. V. Danayya
- Starring: Allari Naresh; Shireen; Pavan; Anil
- Edited by: Gautham Raju
- Music by: Chakri
- Production company: Sri Balaji Art Productions
- Release date: 24 January 2003
- Running time: 142 minutes
- Country: India
- Language: Telugu

Juniors is a 2003 Indian Telugu-language coming of age-romantic drama film directed and co-written by debutant J. Pulla Rao. It is a remake of the Tamil film Thulluvadho Ilamai (2002). The film stars Allari Naresh and Shireen, who reprises her role from the original, along with newcomers Pavan and Anil in supporting roles.

== Cast ==
- Allari Naresh as Mahesh
- Shireen as Pooja
- Pavan as Mahesh's friend
- Anil as Vishnu
- Tanikella Bharani as Mahesh's father
- Prakash Raj as the principal
- Vizag Prasad as Pooja's father
- Sudhakar as a vagabond
- Chittajalu Lakshmipati
- Jr. Relangi
- Gautam Raju
- Dasanna
- Pardhasaaradhi
- Prudhvi Raj
- Banerjee
- Shweta Menon

== Soundtrack ==
The soundtrack was composed by Chakri.

Track listing
No.	Title	Singer(s)	Length
1.	"Preyasi"	Hariharan, Kousalya	4:53
2.	"Naa Gundello"	Chakri, Kousalya	5:08
3.	"Cheliya Cheliya"	S. P. Balasubrahmanyam	4:37
4.	"Chesindhi"	KK, Ravi Verma, Chakri	4:56
5.	"Nighte Joru"	Vasundhara Das, Tippu	4:56
6.	"Hello Hello"	Shankar Mahadevan, K. S. Chithra	4:30
Total length:			29:00

== Release and reception ==
Gudipoodi Srihari of The Hindu criticised the film and stated that "Naresh and all the other college boys and girls get childish cheap roles. Even Naresh the only star attraction in the cast turns out to be a dud. Shireen, a debutante is a total misfit in the cast. Experienced character artistes suffer because of illogical and unsympathetic roles. Music and photography make no sense in this kind of drama". Jeevi of Idlebrain criticised the second half of the film, but praised the performances of Naveen, Sherin, Prakash Raj, Tanikella Bharani, and Sudhakar. A critic from Full Hyderabad wrote that "Juniors is strictly for the juveniles, adolescents, teens, youngsters and any other group that does not fit into either the kids or the adults category".
