= Ranga Shankara =

Theatre in Bangalore, India

- Ranga Shankara logo
- Interactive map of Ranga Shankara
- Address: 36/2 8th Cross, II Phase J P Nagar; Bangalore; India
- Coordinates: 12.911513°N 77.587053°E
- Operator: Sanket Trust
- Capacity: 320
- Type: Provincial

Construction
- Opened: 28 October 2004
- Architect: Sharukh Mistry

Website
- rangashankara.org

Ranga Shankara is one of Bangalore's well known theatres. It is located in the south Bangalore area of J.P Nagar and is run by the Sanket Trust. The auditorium, which opened in 2004, was envisioned by Arundathi Nag, in remembrance of her late husband, Shankar Nag, who was a renowned actor in the Kannada film industry.

It aims to promote theatre in all languages and prides itself in lending out the space at an extremely low fare. It follows an at least "a play a day" policy, six days a week (except on Mondays). Its annual theatre festival brings to the city plays from across the country, giving the audience a good spread to choose from. Over 2,700 performances have been staged since inception, most of them in Kannada, though there have been plays in 23 other languages too.

Audience need to be present in time to be allowed entry to the theatre. It does not matter if you are stuck in traffic or have paid in advance, you simply will not be allowed inside after the specific time mentioned as the start time.

== History ==
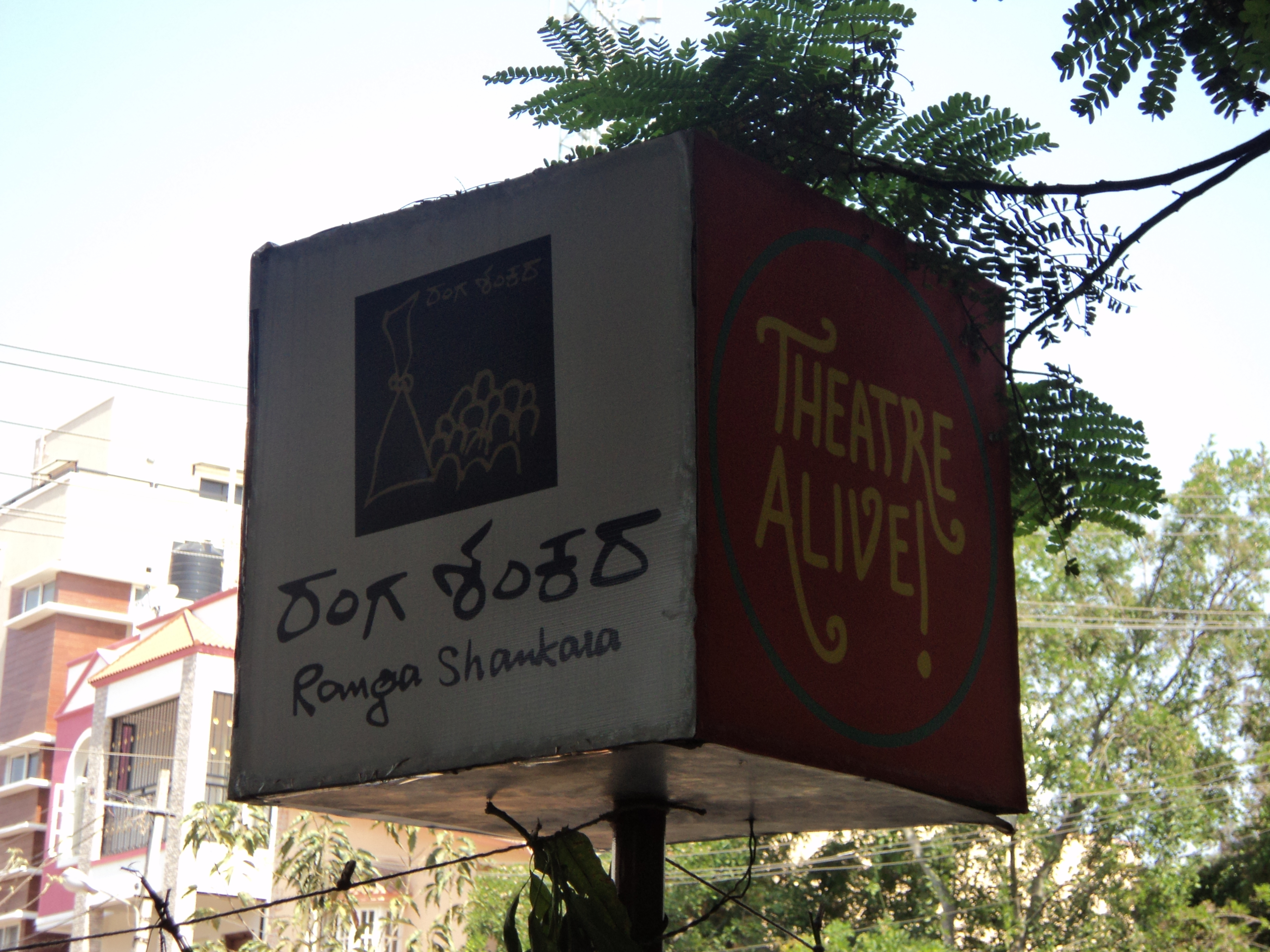
Rangashankara logo

Shankar Nag's dream was to create a vibrant, affordable, inclusive space for theatre and theatre lovers in the city of Bengaluru. After Shankar’s tragic death in 1990, Sanket Trust, with the help of friends and lovers of theatre from all over the country, worked towards building Ranga Shankara, a premier theatre in Bengaluru. In 1994, the Government allotted a plot of land reserved for civic amenities, at JP Nagar, to the trust, on a 30-year lease. However, due to lack of funds, construction only started in 2001. The entire cost of the project of around ₹3 crores. was raised through contributions, ranging from ₹5 from ordinary theatre lovers to big sums from industrialists. The Ranga shankara complex was designed by architect Sharukh Mistry and it was opened to the public on 28 October 2004.

== Objectives ==
Ranga Shankara is a space dedicated to theatre and resembles Mumbai's Prithvi Theatre. It aims to

- Showcase theatrical performances from India and abroad
- Produce and commission new and innovative theatre forms and productions
- Facilitate outreach programmes to build audiences for theatre and to impart theatre skills.

The theatre is rented out only for theatre shows that are open to the public. It does not allow private shows.

== Facilities ==
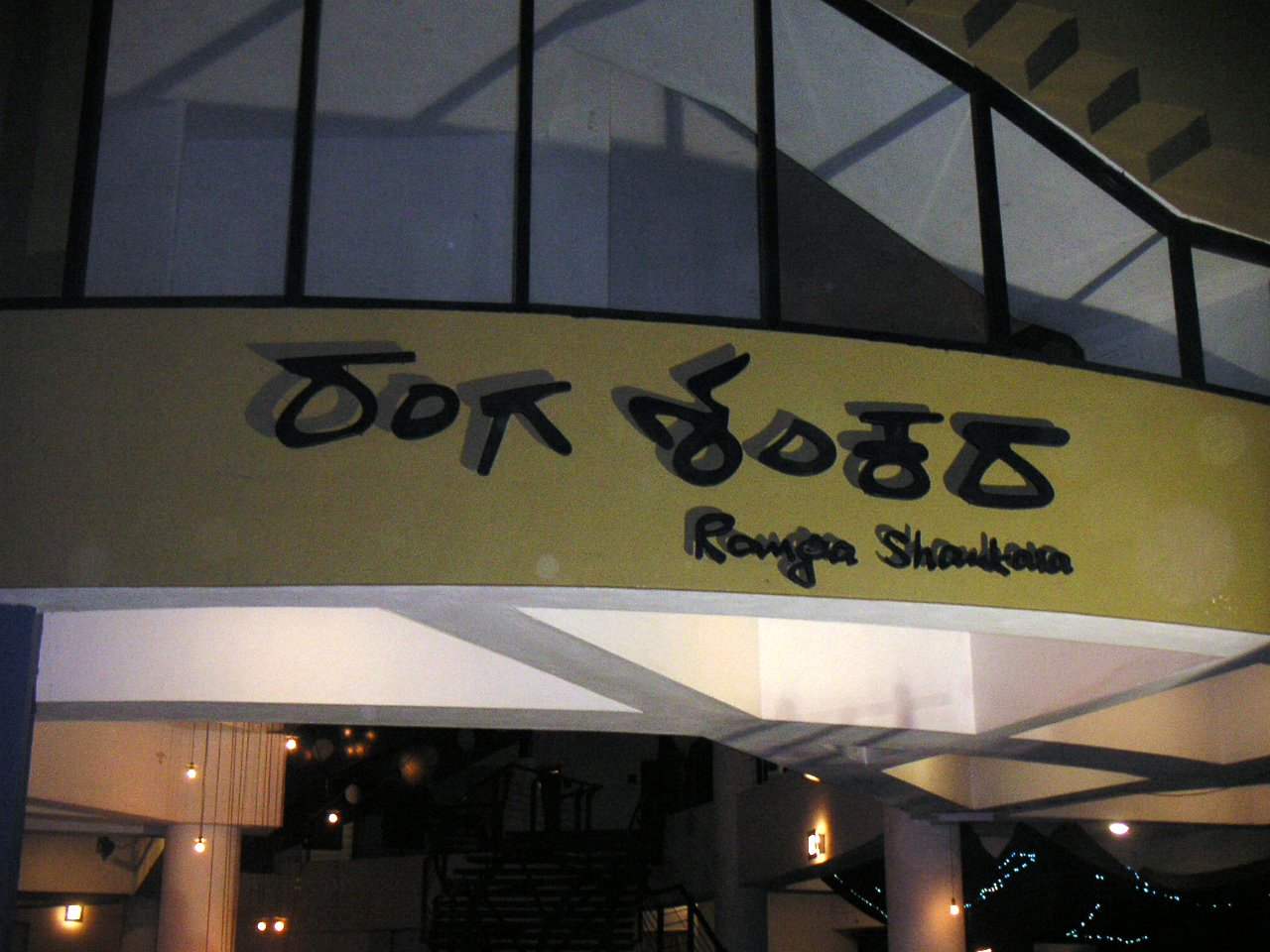
Entrance of Rangashankara

=== Performing space ===
The auditorium has a thrust stage with a floor area of 1575 sq ft, with four green rooms and state-of-the-art sound, lighting, and technical facilities. The stage and the auditorium arrange the acoustics such that artificial amplification is not required.

The auditorium is air conditioned and seats 320. For the convenience of the disabled audience, Ranga Shankara has special access facilities (an elevator, specially equipped rest room and the capacity to accommodate wheelchairs inside the auditorium).

=== Book Shop ===
Ranga Shankara has a bookshop at the front corner of its lobby. It is operated by Paperback Bookshop The collection includes many theatre and performance-related books. It also hosts special events like book launches and reading sessions.

=== Café ===
The café is open from 11am to 9pm and serves food that ranges from akki roti, sabudhana vada and bhajjis to soup du jour with herbal bread rolls. It provides scope for interaction between audience and performers after a show. In addition, it is a venue for theatre festival-related seminars and activities, special talks and lectures.

== Annual Theatre Festival ==
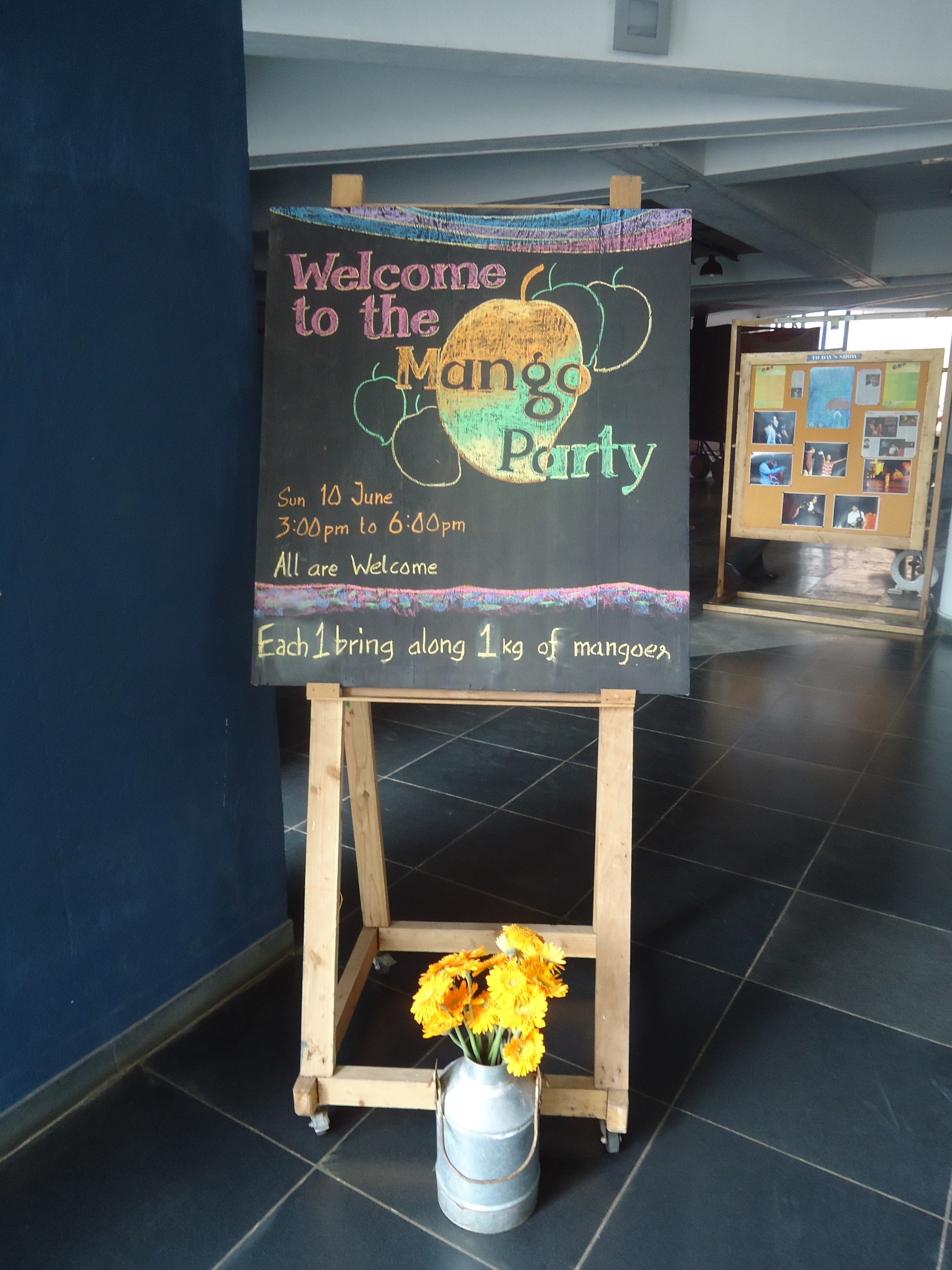
Annual Mango Party held at Rangashankara

Ranga Shankara hosts an annual theatre festival, with plays in all languages being staged, along with readings and platform performances. The festival has become a landmark on the Bangalore theatre scene. In 2011, it will be hosting the fourth annual theatre festival. To be held from 15 to 23 October, it has Politics in Play as the central theme and is being curated by theatre personality and journalist Prakash Belawadi. This year's panellists include journalist Aakar Patel and academic Chandan Gowda.

Rangashankara also hosts other annual events. Most popular being the Mango party. Annual Mango party celebrates the season of mango which is the national fruit of India. People come here and enjoy all the different varieties of mangoes. In 2012 Rangashankara celebrated to 10th edition of mango party.

Another popular event is Ranga Ugadi (ರಂಗ ಯುಗಾದಿ). Ugadi is the New Year's Day for the people of the Deccan region of India. This event is celebrated to the closest Sunday around Ugadi. This will be generally an entire day event, with plays and cultural events.
