= P. B. Balaji (composer) =

- Occupations: Music composer, actor
- Years active: 2007–present
- Spouse: R Janani (m. 2011)

P. B. Balaji (also known as Vidhu Balaji) is an Indian actor and former music composer, who has worked in Tamil and Kannada-language films.

== Career ==
After working on two of Atlanta Ganesh's telefilms, Balaji made his debut in Tamil cinema with Inba. He then worked on a few Kannada films before returning to Tamil cinema through the delayed film Sooran. As of 2011, he worked on the unreleased films Kathiri Veyil in Tamil and Asagam in Kannada. He also worked on the unreleased film Kothangodu Bungalow in 2022.

In 2022, he made his debut as an actor in Guest co-starring Sakshi Agarwal under the stage name of Vidhu Balaji. The film had a delayed release in 2026.

== Discography ==
Year	Film	Language	Notes
2007	My Dear Father	English; Tamil	Telefilm; Tamil title: En Iniya Thanthai
2007	Self Defence	English; Tamil	Telefilm; Tamil title: Aththu Meera Aasai
2008	Inba	Tamil	
2008	Mast Maja Maadi	Kannada	
2009	Chamkaisi Chindi Udaysi	Kannada	
2011	Sooran	Tamil	
2012	Kasi Kuppam	Tamil	
2015	Thunai Mudhalvar	Tamil	Credited as Balaji; one of three composers; songs only
2018	Koothan	Tamil	Credited as Balz_G

As playback singer

- Baaji (2009; Kannada)
- Sihigaali (2010; Kannada)
- Mast Maja Maadi (2011; Kannada)

== Filmography ==
Year	Title	Role	Language	Notes
2026	Guest	Vidhu	Tamil	
2026	Moondru Mudichu		Tamil	Sun TV serial
