= Sooran (film) =

2014 Indian film by Balu Narayanan

- Directed by: Balu Narayanan
- Written by: Balu Narayanan
- Produced by: J. Venkatesan; B. Selvaraj; M. Sureshkumar
- Starring: Karan; Anumol; Shipali Sharma
- Cinematography: M. Sivakumar
- Edited by: Saleem
- Music by: P. B. Balaji
- Production company: Arowana Pictures Private Limited
- Release date: 11 July 2014
- Country: India
- Language: Tamil

Sooran is a 2014 Indian Tamil-language neo-noir crime drama film directed by Balu Narayanan. It stars Karan, Anumol and Shipali Sharma in the lead roles. The film was released after being in production for four years, in July 2014.

== Cast ==
- Karan as Sadha
- Anumol as Yamuna
- Shipali Sharma
- Sathish as Saravanan
- Jagan as Deivam
- Manivannan
- Ponvannan as Aarai
- Mahadevan
- Santhana Bharathi
- Raj Kapoor as Inspector Muthuvel
- Adyar Pazhani
- Nellai Siva as Police officer

== Production and release ==
The film, directed by newcomer Balu Narayanan, began production in 2010 and was set in north Madras. Karan plays a hitman for local rowdies. The film was expected to release in February 2012.

== Soundtrack ==
The music was composed by P. B. Balaji. An audio launch was held for the film in August 2011, with S. P. Jananathan and K. Bhagyaraj being the event's chief guests.

No.	Title	Artist(s)	Length
1.	"Ayyanar Kuthirayilla"	Harini	03:52
2.	"Engayooru Sami"	Balu Narayanan	01:50
3.	"Ethatho Matram"	Pop Shalini Singh	05:02
4.	"Mamanoda Colour"	Balu Narayanan	04:20
5.	"Thappae Thappila"	Udit Narayan, Rita	04:48
6.	"Vaa Maa"	Surmukhi Raman, Vidyalakshmi, Rita	04:13
