= Sanket Trust =

Theater management organization

- Founded: 1992
- Type: Service organization /non-profit
- Purpose: Arts and Culture
- Location: Bangalore
- Origins: Arundhati Nag (Managing Trustee); Girish Karnad (Former Chairman)
- Region served: India

The Sanket Trust is a non-profit trust established in 1992 in Bangalore playwright Girish Karnad was its Chairman and actor-theatre practitioner Arundhati Nag, as its Managing Trustee, apart from theatre personalities as well as administrative experts on its board of trustees. It formally administers Ranga Shankara and all its activities. The Trust is advised and guided by theatre activists from all over the country. This informal advisory group meets whenever necessary to review Ranga Shankara activities and share ideas.

== History ==
The Sanket Trust was founded in 1992 by a group of theatre lovers, many of whom had worked with Shankar Nag and Arundhati Nag in the Sanket theatre group. Rangashankara was established in 2001 as an initiative of Sanket Trust, for bringing local and international performances to the theatre audiences in Bangalore, at an affordable cost and provide performing space to theatre groups at an affordable rent.
