= Bisile =

2010 Indian Kannada-language film

- Directed by: Sandeep S Gowda
- Produced by: Kiran P Reddy
- Starring: Diganth; Jennifer Kotwal
- Cinematography: A R Niranjan Banu
- Edited by: Shivaraj Mehu
- Music by: Gagan-Hari
- Release date: 26 November 2010
- Country: India
- Language: Kannada

Bisile is a 2010 Indian Kannada-language film directed by Sandeep S Gowda, starring Diganth and Jennifer Kotwal in the lead roles.

== Cast ==
- Diganth as Vicky
- Jennifer Kotwal as Anu
- Dwarakish
- M. S. Umesh
- Jai Jagadish
- Shivaram
- Lakshmi Devamma
- Sunethra Pandith
- Chithra Shenoy
- Shailaja Joshi

== Music ==
Bisile

Soundtrack album by Gagan Baderiya Rishikesh Hari
- Released: 2010
- Recorded: 2010
- Genre: Feature film soundtrack
- Length: 29:43
- Language: Kannada

Official audio
- Bisile - Full Album on YouTube

Track listing
| No. | Title | Singer(s) | Length |
|---|---|---|---|
| 1. | "Andakivale" | Rishikesh Hari | 1:14 |
| 2. | "Ee Bhoomiya" | Rishikesh Hari, Ramya, Gurupreeth | 2:55 |
| 3. | "Ee Bisileli" | Sonu Nigam | 5:16 |
| 4. | "Ee Bisileli (Remix)" | Sonu Nigam | 1:07 |
| 5. | "Idu Kanasa" | Sudarshan | 3.16 |
| 6. | "Kanda Kanasugalu" | K. S. Chithra | 1:53 |
| 7. | "Naa Haadoke" | Shaan, Godlove | 3:34 |
| 8. | "Nannusiru" | Kunal Ganjawala, Sunidhi Chauhan | 5:01 |
| 9. | "Ninnanda Kaanadagi" | Sandeep Bathra | 2.45 |
| 10. | "Ninnanda Nodalende" | Hariharan | 4:02 |
| Total length: | | | 29:43 |

== Reception ==
=== Critical response ===
Shruti Indira Lakshminarayana from Rediff.com scored the film at 2 out of 5 stars and says "Digant and Jeniffer make a good looking pair. The role offered to Diganth seems more like an extension of his lover boy image. He does a good job and proves that he can perform outside the Yograj Bhat camp as well. Jeniffer gets to do nothing but walk, smile and dance in designer wears in the first half, while she mouths a few dialogues and gets to perform a bit in the second. Actors like Jai Jagdeesh and Biradar have been wasted. Bisile could have been a perfect family entertainer if only backed by a stronger script". A critic from The Times of India scored the film at 3.5 out of 5 stars and says "Diganth and Jennifer Kotwal have shown great chemistry on-screen, while Dwarakish and Umesh are at their humorous best. Gagan-Hari's foot-tapping music keeps up the up-beat tone of the film while A R niranjan Babu's cinematography needs special mention". B S Srivani from Deccan Herald wrote "Bisile gives viewers some respite from other mindless fare currently on offer. Gagan-Rishi also impress on their maiden outing with two melodious numbers which Niranjan Babu’s camerawork has embellished. The director’s rough edges need to be smoothened out, but for all that, Bisile creates enough sunny moments. Families and youth are certain to enjoy the dialogues". A critic from Bangalore Mirror wrote "Though the storyline is slim, it is amply made up by the dialogues, with the style of saying the unobvious that keeps the audience glued throughout. In this aspect, Diganth gets to mouth dialogues which his mentor Yograj Bhat made popular once - and it never goes over the top. Effortless, Bisile must be Diganth's best film to date. For the visual canopy he provides, Niranjan Babu, the cinematographer, too deserves a special mention. Bisile is a beauty. Get in".
