= Rame Gowda vs Krishna Reddy =

- Directed by: T. N. Nagesh
- Written by: B. A. Madhu (dialogue)
- Screenplay by: T. N. Nagesh
- Story by: K. Babu
- Produced by: Waseem D Santhosh Singh
- Starring: Anant Nag; Rangayana Raghu; Shashikumar
- Cinematography: Jai Anand
- Edited by: Narahalli Jnanesh
- Music by: Krishnavardhan Kulkarni
- Production companies: Ocean Multivision India Pvt.Ltd; Rehan Enterprises
- Release date: 24 September 2010
- Country: India
- Language: Kannada

Rame Gowda vs Krishna Reddy is a 2010 Indian Kannada-language comedy drama film directed by T. N. Nagesh and starring Anant Nag, Rangayana Raghu and Shashikumar. The film is a remake of the Hindi film Khosla Ka Ghosla (2006). The film released alongside Huli (2010) and Nayaka (2010).

== Cast ==
- Anant Nag as Subbanna
- Rangayana Raghu as Krishna Reddy
- Shashikumar as Rame Gowda
- Roopasri as Roopa
- R. G. Vijayasarathy
- Sudha Belawadi

== Production ==
The film was initially titled Gowda vs Reddy as a reference to the rivalry between H. D. Deve Gowda and G. Janardhana Reddy.

== Music ==
Rame Gowda vs Krishna Reddy

Soundtrack album by Krishnavardhan Kulkarni
- Released: 2010
- Recorded: 2010
- Genre: Feature film soundtrack
- Length: 22:24
- Language: Kannada

All music is composed by Krishnavardhan Kulkarni

Track listing
No.	Title	Singer(s)	Length
1.	"Minchodu Koraiside"	Deepak Doddera	5:05
2.	"Belake Belake (Female)"	M. A. Anupama	4:43
3.	"Nodaiah Gombbeya Aata"	Badri Prasad	3:45
4.	"Belake Belake (Male)"	Deepak Doddera	4:43
5.	"Ranga Chaduranga"	Ajay Warrier	4:08
Total length:			22:24

== Reception ==
A critic from The Times of India wrote that "The director could have done a better job by taking present-day developments as a reference point". A critic from Bangalore Mirror wrote that "It was an uncomplicated story, all it needed was a tight narrative. If one leaves out a few outdoor scenes, it would be hard to distinguish the film from a tele-serial". A critic from IANS wrote that "Director T.N. Nagesh has succeeded in portraying the sufferings and anxiety of a middle-class family victimised by a greedy land-grabber. But he somewhere loses the grip in the second half".
