= Handel Manuel =

Indian musician and composer (1918–1994)

- Born: 27 April 1918; Tuticorin, Tamil Nadu, India
- Died: 22 October 1994 (aged 76) Chennai, India
- Occupations: Music
- Awards: Padmashri

Handel Manuel (27 April 1918 – 22 October 1994) was an Indian pianist, organist, conductor, composer and accompanist, who helped to make western classical music popular in Chennai, India. Manuel was the first Indian conductor of the Madras Musical Association. He also served for over 50 years as the organist and choirmaster at St Andrew's Church, Chennai and was the founder director of the Madras Philharmonic and Choral Society. He was the station director, Western music of All India Radio, and also in charge of its children's program.

== Biography ==
Handel Manuel was born in Tuticorin, India, on 27 April 1918, and was named after the composer George Frideric Handel. He was educated at the Madras Christian College, but he did not study music there. He was a self-taught composer.

At the age of 23 Manuel became the first Indian conductor of the Madras Musical Association. He also served for over 50 years as the organist and choirmaster at St Andrew's Church, Chennai (known as The Kirk) and was the founder director of the Madras Philharmonic and Choral Society.

Handel Manuel taught as music teacher in C.S.I Bain's School towards the end of his career. Handel Manuel was the person who wrote and augmented the western musical notes, including the characteristic semi-tones, for the National Anthem of India. He was the Station Director Western Music of All India Radio, Madras which is known as A.I.R. and he was in charge of Children's program. His son is Viji Manuel who played the keyboard for Ilayaraja, Film Music Composer and Director. Manuel died on 22 October 1994.

== Honours and awards ==
- He is the only Indian to be invited to the International Tchaikovsky Competition held in Moscow.
- He was elected Honorary Life Member of the Royal School of Church Music, London.
- He was appointed Producer Emeritus, All India Radio.
- He was awarded the Padmashri in 1983.
- He was also awarded the For The Sake of Honour award from Rotary.
- Alan Hovhaness, the American composer, dedicated two pieces to Manuel: the "Arjuna" Symphony and an Organ Sonata.

== Legacy ==
At the request of several choristers who had sung under Manuel, Sharada and Surender Schaffter founded the Handel Manuel Chorus in 2003. Surender is the younger brother of Handel Manuel. This non-denominational choir has thirty members and specializes mostly in church music of the Baroque and Classical periods. They have performed at Egmore Wesley, St George's Cathedral, the Emmanuel Methodist Church and St. Andrew's Church, Bangalore.

His son, Viji Manuel has been acknowledged as the best pianist and bass player in India and has performed for over forty years consistently for acclaimed Indian composer Ilaiyaraaja. Viji Manuel died in August 2015.
