= 35/100 Just Pass =

- Promotional poster
- Directed by: Deepak H. T.
- Written by: Deepak H. T.
- Produced by: Yashwanth; Deepak H. T. Santosh
- Starring: Raghu Ramappa: Vikram Joshi; Shwetha Murthy
- Cinematography: Sandeep Kumar
- Edited by: Sathya
- Music by: Pranava N Iyengar
- Production company: Kasthuri Nivasa Films
- Release date: 26 March 2010
- Country: India
- Language: Kannada

35/100 Just Pass is a 2010 Indian Kannada-language romantic drama film directed by Deepak and starring Raghu Ramappa, Vikram Joshi and Shwetha Murthy. The film was released to mixed reviews.

== Plot ==
The film follows four college boys including Shiva and Ankur who are all in love with Preeti.

== Cast ==
- Raghu Ramappa as Shiva
- Vikram Joshi as Ankur
- Shwetha Murthy as Preeti
- Manojava Galgali
- Shankar
- Kiran Kumar

== Production ==
All of the cast and crew except for the director and producer Yeshwant work in the software industry. The money for the film came from the money the movie team saved up for their houses. The film was delayed after a theatre profit sharing and rental issue.

== Soundtrack ==
The music was composed by Pranava N Iyengar. The lyrics are written by Swaroop Gururaj and Pranava N Iyengar.

All lyrics are written by Swaroop Gururaj.

Track listing
No.	Title	Singer(s)	Length
1.	"Geechi Geechi"	Abhishek V. Pande, Guru	3:23
2.	"Ee Darigalindu"	Vineeth S, Sangeetha M. R.	3:44
3.	"Ninna Hesarinalli (Aase)"	Vaisakh, G. Guru
4.	"Jeeva Beyyo (Sanne)"	Abhijith Savanth
5.	"Nee Ninthiha"	Pradeep
6.	"Neeraraga"	Vaisag G., G. Guru
7.	"35/100"	Sathish Aaryan, Vijay Urs, Krishna J. V.

== Reception ==
A critic from Rediff.com rated the film 3 1/2 out of 5 and wrote that "35/100... Just Pass may not stand out for its 'many boys falling for one girl' story line, but it surely scores above average when it comes to its narrative techniques". A critic from IANS wrote that "Since the film is made in a limited budget and has been shot with a digital camera, technically it has many loop holes. Though the film is realistic in its presentation, lack of technical content has diluted the impact. But the director has managed to convey the message". A critic from Indiaglitz rated the film 3 1/2 out of 10 and wrote that "There is some unconventional style but on the whole it is not convincing. Director Deepak should know that realistic approach in the narration without any intriguing moment and entertaining values the film cannot fill the cash registers".
