= Sihigaali =

2010 Indian Kannada-language drama film

- Directed by: Lekhan
- Written by: Lekhan
- Produced by: Anil; Balakrishna; Umesh
- Starring: Sriimurali; Sherin; Thulasi Shivamani; Sharan
- Cinematography: Niranjan Babu
- Edited by: K. M. Prakash
- Music by: B. R. Shankar
- Production company: Aishwarya Arts
- Release date: 10 March 2010
- Country: India
- Language: Kannada

Sihigaali (transl. Sweet air) is a 2010 Indian Kannada-language drama film directed and written by Lekhan. The film stars Sriimurali and Sherin with Thulasi Shivamani and Sharan in supporting roles.

== Cast ==
- Sriimurali as Dharani
- Sherin as Jeevi
- Thulasi Shivamani
- Sharan
- Achyuth Kumar
- Chethan Rai

== Production ==
Debutant director Lekhan opted to make his first film and chose to focus on the mother-son relationship. Actress Sherin made a comeback after a brief absence from acting through the project, and shot for forty days.

== Soundtrack ==
All music is composed by B. R. Shankar.

Track listing
No.	Title	Lyrics	Singer(s)	Length
1.	"Brahma Kalisada Daiva"	V. Nagendra Prasad	Rajesh Krishnan, Sunitha Sanje	5:27
2.	"Deewana Deewana"	Sarvesh	Allwyn, Chaitra H. G.	3:56
3.	"Hele Thangaali"	Hemanth Das	Kunal Ganjawala, Chinmayi	5:40
4.	"Jeeva Jeeva Bereso"	Hemanth Das	Kushal	2:30
5.	"Kathegara Yaravanu"	Sarvesh	K. J. Yesudas	5:44
6.	"Ninnaa Nenedare"	Jayanth Kaikini	Shaan, Shwetha	5:23
7.	"Ranne Ranne"	V. Nagendra Prasad	Shankar Mahadevan, Balaji	4:31
Total length:				33:11

== Reception ==
=== Critical response ===
Shruti Indira Lakshminarayana of Rediff.com scored the film at 1 out of 5 stars and says "Dialogues, especially those between the just smitten Dharni and Jeevi, are too poetic to digest. Sharan, who plays Murali's friend, also fails to impress. Stale jokes find a place in the film and there is nothing even Sharan can do to make them sound funny. Sihigalli is sure to give you a headache. Give it a miss". BSS from Deccan Herald wrote "Normal situations tend to turn syrupy while those that need to be tightened are cut a huge slack. Neither Niranjan Babu’s camerawork nor the music can make this “gaali”, a “sihigaali”. A prodigal waste". A critic from Bangalore Mirror wrote "Leykkhan messes with the film and the producer’s money big time. If you don’t want to do the same with your time, keep a safe distance from Sihigaali. It is a gasbag and smells bad". Sify.com wrote "Lekhan's brainless narrative fails to bring even decent performance from talented artists like Sri Murali, Thualsi Shivamani and Sharan. Shirin is wasted. However Murali shines in a few action sequences. It is better to avoid 'Sihi Gaali' ".
