= Jennifer Kotwal =

Indian actress and model

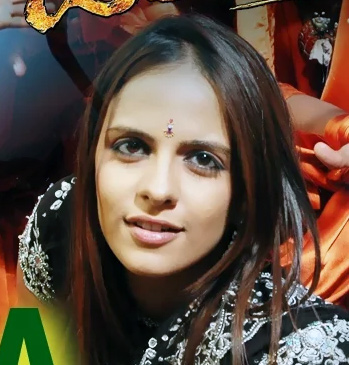
- Jennifer Kotwal in 2007
- Occupations: Actress, model
- Years active: 1999–2014

Jennifer Kotwal is an Indian actress and a model who predominantly appeared in Kannada-language films. She is best known for her role in the film Jogi, 2005 Indian Kannada-language action film written and directed by Prem.

In 2015, she was a travel host for a season of Oh My Gold which was telecast on the Travel and Living Channel.

== Filmography ==
Year	Film	Role	Language	Notes
2001	Bas Itna Sa Khwaab Hai	Suraj's sister	Hindi	
2001	Yaadein	Preeti Sahai	Hindi	
2002	Manasunte Chalu	Sravanti	Telugu	
2003	Naaga	Angel	Telugu	
2005	Jogi	Nivedhitha	Kannada	
2006	Shri	Deepa	Kannada	
2007	Ugadi	Priya	Kannada	
2007	Masti		Kannada	
2007	Sathyavan Savithri	Monisha	Kannada	
2007	Snehana Preethina	Jennifer	Kannada	Guest appearance
2007	Lava Kusha	Sarah	Kannada	
2007	Ee Bandhana	Pallavi	Kannada	Extended cameo appearance
2008	Nee Tata Naa Birla	Teja	Kannada	
2008	Mast Maja Maadi	Sahana	Kannada	
2010	Eradane Maduve	Veena	Kannada	
2010	Jothegara		Kannada	Special appearance
2010	Appu and Pappu	Sanjana	Kannada	Special appearance
2010	Bisile	Anu	Kannada	
2010	Huli	Preethi	Kannada	
2011	Prince	Preethi	Kannada	
2011	Mathond Madhuvena	Veena	Kannada	

=== Television ===
Year 2001	Show	Channel Zee TV
1999	Just Mohabbat	Sony TV
2001	Hip Hip Hurray	Zee TV
2014	Oh My Gold	TLC
