= Huli (film) =

Indian action film

- Official poster
- Directed by: Om Prakash Rao
- Written by: M. S. Ramesh (dialogues)
- Screenplay by: D Manohar
- Story by: Denissa Prakash
- Produced by: B S Sudheendra; E Shivaprakash
- Starring: Kishore; Jennifer Kotwal
- Cinematography: S Manohar
- Edited by: Lakshmana Reddy
- Music by: Abhimann Roy
- Production company: Shivu Enterprises
- Release date: 17 December 2010
- Country: India
- Language: Kannada

Huli (transl. Tiger) is a 2010 Indian Kannada-language action drama film directed by Om Prakash Rao and starring Kishore and Jennifer Kotwal. The film released alongside Rame Gowda vs Krishna Reddy (2010) and Nayaka (2010).

== Cast ==
- Kishore as Chandappa Huliyal
- Jennifer Kotwal as Preethi
- Swasthik Shankar
- Adi Lokesh
- Prem Kumar
- Shobaraj as Jayaraj
- Srinivasa Murthy
- Avinash
- Malavika Avinash as Bharathi
- Sumithra
- Chitra Shenoy

== Production ==
Initially Neethu was cast as the heroine, but she was replaced by Jennifer Kotwal.

== Soundtrack ==
The music was composed by Abhimann Roy. The audio was released under the label Anand Audio.

Track listing
No.	Title	Singer(s)	Length
1.	"Sadde Illade"	Avinash Chebbi, Lakshmi	4:10
2.	"Huli"	Avinash Chebbi, Abhimann Roy	3:12
3.	"China Bazaar"	Chaitra H. G.	4:35
4.	"Sadde Illade - 1"	Avinash Chebbi	4:10
Total length:			16:07

== Reception ==
A critic from The Times of India wrote that "This commercial flick carries a strong message that people need to help the police help them". A critic from Rediff.com wrote that "Huli is an average mass movie with messages that we have heard time and again".
