= Inba (film) =

- DVD cover
- Directed by: S. T. Vendan
- Written by: Subha (dialogues)
- Story by: Vendhan
- Produced by: Vijayasri Nandakumar
- Starring: Shaam; Sneha
- Cinematography: Sai Trilok
- Edited by: G. R Anil Malnad
- Music by: P. B. Balaji
- Production company: Rathnamala Movies
- Release date: 21 March 2008
- Running time: 125 minutes
- Country: India
- Language: Tamil

Inba (spelt onscreen as Inbaa) is a 2008 Indian Tamil-language masala film directed by S. T. Vendan. The film stars Shaam and Sneha, with Arun Pandian in an antagonistic role. It was released on 21 March 2008. The film marks the third collaboration between Shaam and Sneha after Yai! Nee Romba Azhaga Irukey! and ABCD.

== Plot ==
Inba is a rough character who works under Priya's brother, Malai Ganesan, as a bodyguard of Priya. Priya is an usurious girl, spending most of the time with her friends and absenting herself from the college several times. Hence Malai Ganeshan employs Inba, his faithful servant to guard Priya's activities. Priya insults him several times since she was not interested in somebody guarding her all the time. Priya falls for Inba, but he rejects it. In the meantime, Malai Ganeshan learns of the love affair and opposes it by beating up Inba. Inba opens a flashback about his love for a girl named Jyothi in school and the rest of story describes how Priya makes him understand his love and finally succeeds in his love after overcoming the hurdles and obstacles laid by Malai Ganeshan.

== Cast ==
- Shaam as Inba
- Sneha as Priya
- Arun Pandian as Malai Ganesan
- Rekha as Malai Ganesan's wife
- Ganja Karuppu as "Saavi" Shankar, Inba's uncle
- Aravind Akash as Rupan
- Adithya as Rupan's brother
- Poornitha as Jyothi
- Thalaivasal Vijay as Rangan, Inba's father
- Sulakshana as Inba's mother
- Shankar as "Saavi" Shankar's friend
- Boys Rajan as Jyothi's father
- Bayilvan Ranganathan as a police officer
- Siva Narayana Murthy as a police officer (uncredited)

== Soundtrack ==
The music was composed by P. B. Balaji, in his debut.

Title	Singer(s)	Length
"Alankatti"	Tippu, Pop Shalini	05:14
"En Vizhigal Meethu"	Shreya Ghoshal, Naresh Iyer	05:05
"Kabul Nattu"	Suchitra, Chorus	04:48
"Yaro Yaro"	Karthik, Chinmayi	05:12
"Mayakalli"	Jassie Gift, Anuradha Sriram	04:39
"Soora Thenga"	Mahesh Panjanathan	04:51

== Release and reception ==
Inbaa was released on 21 March 2008, Good Friday. A critic from Rediff.com gave the film a rating of one out of five stars and wrote that "Everybody spouts the standard lines (what was dialogue-writer Subha thinking?) and once the climax is done, you heave yourself off the cramped seats with relief". Sudhish Kamath from The Hindu wrote that "By all means, go for Inba. It's the most inspiring piece of Tamil cinema. If this chap can make a movie, so can you". A critic from Sify gave the film a verdict of below average and wrote that "The film fails to entertain as the twists and turns are predictable, the Shaam- Sneha romance leaves you cold, and music of P.B Balaji is worth a snore not even one humable number. It is another banal formula film to be avoided". Cinesouth gave the film a negative review.

Following the success of Kick, also featuring Shaam, Inbaa was partially reshot in Telugu as Neelo Naalo with actors Sunil and Junior Relangi. The Telugu version was directed by Nandhu and featured Kothapalli Ramakrishna as the cinematographer.
