= List of songs recorded by Chaitra H. G. =

List of songs recorded by Chaitra H G.
- Category: Songs
Tamil Film Songs	2
Kannada Film Songs	76
Total	94

Chaitra H. G. is an Indian playback singer who sings predominantly in Kannada films. She has also recorded songs in Telugu, Tamil and Malayalam films, with the number totalling to over 1000 film songs and 6000 songs non-film songs.

== Kannada film songs ==
=== 1994 ===
Film	Song	Composer(s)	Writer(s)	Co-singer(s)	Ref.
Beda Krishna Ranginata	"Kogileye Kogileye"	V. Manohar		Jaggesh	

=== 2004 ===
Film	Song	Composer(s)	Writer(s)	Co-singer(s)	Ref.
Bhagawan	"Chaska Maska Hudugi"	Rajesh Ramanath	Kaviraj		
Omkara	"Abbabba Eeke"	Gurukiran	Kaviraj	Gurukiran	
Omkara	"Goli Maaro"	Gurukiran	Kaviraj	Gurukiran	

=== 2005 ===
Film	Song	Composer(s)	Writer(s)	Co-singer(s)	Ref.
Rakshasa	"Jollu Jollu Jollayya"	Sadhu Kokila	V. Nagendra Prasad		
Deadly Soma	"Chindi Bidda"	Sadhu Kokila	Manjunath	Anoop	
Namma Basava	"Mina Mina"	Gurukiran	V. Manohar		
Amrithadhare	"Huduga Huduga"	Mano Murthy	Nagathihalli Chandrashekhar		
Rishi	"Bhandanuru Bhandarella"	Gurukiran		Puneeth Rajkumar	
Gunna	"Run"	Mahesh		Dwarki	
Gunna	"Suryanannu"	Mahesh		Hemanth	

=== 2006 ===
Film	Song	Composer(s)	Writer(s)	Co-singer(s)	Ref.
Mata	"Kaajolu Kappagilve"	Udaya Ravi	Kaviraj	Hemanth Kumar	
Jothe Jotheyali	"Koline Koogadilla"	V. Harikrishna	V. Nagendra Prasad		
Madana	"Taathai Taathai"	Yuvan Shankar Raja	V. Nagendra Prasad	Anoop	
Neelakanta	"Malla Malla"	V. Ravichandran	V. Ravichandran		
Julie	My Heart is Beating"	Rajesh Ramanath			
Julie	Dhava Dhava Yeh Eyali"	Rajesh Ramanath		Udit Narayan	

=== 2007 ===
Film	Song	Composer(s)	Writer(s)	Co-singer(s)	Ref.
Poojari	"Kannalle"	Abhiman	Prashanth	Divya Raghavan	
Jambada Hudugi	"Lifea Fantasy"	Rajesh Ramanath			
Meera Madhava Raghava	"Bullellevva Bellulli"	Hamsalekha			
Milana	"Kaddu Kaddu"	Mano Murthy	V. Nagendra Prasad	Suresh Peters, Praveen Datth Stephen	
Gunavantha	"Chaaku Choori"	Hamsalekha	Hamsalekha		
Lava Kusha	"Hotappo Hotu"	Gurukiran	Kaviraj	Puneeth Rajkumar	

=== 2008 ===
Film	Song	Composer(s)	Writer(s)	Co-singer(s)	Ref.
Gaja	"Bangari Yare Nee"	V. Harikrishna	V. Nagendra Prasad	Jassie Gift	
Nee Tata Naa Birla	"Jeballi Pudi Pudi Kasilla"	Gurukiran	V. Manohar	Karthik	
Nee Tata Naa Birla	"Sakhi Sakhi"	Gurukiran	V. Manohar	Gurukiran	
Moggina Manasu	"Teenage Teenage"	Mano Murthy	Shashank	Inchara	
Anthu Inthu Preethi Banthu	"Hey Baby"	Yuvan Shankar Raja	Kaviraj	Hemanth Kumar	
Anthu Inthu Preethi Banthu	"Nee Chumu Chumu"	Yuvan Shankar Raja	Kaviraj	Karthik	
Arjun	"Gunturu Gunturu"	V. Harikrishna	Kaviraj	Jassie Gift, Tippu	
Patre Loves Padma	"Elli Anta"	Arjun Janya	Chandrashekhar Srivastav	Gururaj Hosakote	
Dheena	"Hogtavnallo"	Arjun Janya		Shankar Shanbag	
Accident	Preethi Moodo Vele"	Ricky Kej	Rajendra Karanth		
Accident	"Jigidu Banthu"	Ricky Kej	Kannadiga Shivu	Kunal Ganjawala	

=== 2009 ===
Film	Song	Composer(s)	Writer(s)	Co-singer(s)	Ref.
Venkata in Sankata	"Koogi Kuniyona"	Ricky Kej	Kaviraj	Avinash Chebbi	
Venkata in Sankata	"Nodutha"	Ricky Kej	Jayant Kaikini	Naresh Iyer	
Ghauttham	"Rangavittala"	Gurukiran	V. Manohar	Aniruddh	
Ghauttham	"Ammo Ammo"	Gurukiran	V. Manohar	Gurukiran	
Jhossh	"Yeh Mera Bharat Mahan"	Vardhan	Kaviraj	Vardhan, Harsha, Anuradha Bhat	
Olave Jeevana Lekkachaara	"Nodi Swamy"	Mano Murthy	Nagathihalli Chandrashekhar	Rajesh Mehar	
Yodha	"Lip To Lip"	Hamsalekha	Hamsalekha	Jassie Gift	
Shishira	"Vidyege Dasanagu"	B. Ajaneesh Loknath	Nagathihalli Chandrashekhar	B. Ajaneesh Loknath	

=== 2010 ===
Film	Song	Composer(s)	Writer(s)	Co-singer(s)	Ref.
Mr. Theertha	"Hudugi Hudugi"	Gurukiran	Kaviraj	Karthik	
Nam Areal Ond Dina	"Jamaise"	Arjun Janya	Arvind Kaushik, Manjunath Bagade	Ranjith	
Gangleader	"Cheluva Cheluva"	Abhimann Roy	Ramesh Raj	Abhimann Roy	
Kari Chirathe	"My Name is Kari Chirathe"	Sadhu Kokila	Tushar Ranganath	Tippu	

=== 2011 ===
Film	Song	Composer(s)	Writer(s)	Co-singer(s)	Ref.
Ko Ko	"Labaa Labaa Labaa"	Ramana Gogula	Kaviraj	Kailash Kher	
Ko Ko	"Kitti Bhaava"	Ramana Gogula	Kaviraj	Gurukiran	
Bete	"Kirriku Maado"	Akhil G.			
Nee Illadhe	"Bejaro Bejaru"	Ashley Mendonca, Abhilash Lakra	Shivu Jamkhandi		
Kirataka	"Dubai Thorsu"	V. Manohar	V. Manohar	Tippu	
Kirataka	"Kirik Kirik Kiraathaka"	V. Manohar	V. Manohar	Bharath	
Shrimathi	"Viraha Nooru Taraha"	Ghantadi Krishna	Vijaya Narasimha		
Shrimathi	"Sanje Sanje Mussanje"	Ghantadi Krishna	V. Nagendra Prasad	Joel	
Krishnan Marriage Story	"Nidde Bandilla"	V. Sridhar	V. Sridhar	Mika Singh, Nanditha, Anuradha Bhat	
Banna Bannada Loka	"Kaldode Ninna Nodi"	Thomas Rathnam	Ram Prasad	Vijay Prakash	
Banna Bannada Loka	"Olave Matra"	Thomas Rathnam	Suresh Kirthi	Priya	
Banna Bannada Loka	"Kaldo De"	Thomas Rathnam	Ram Prasad	Dr. Vincent Therraisnathan	
Maduve Mane	"Priya Ninna"	Manikanth Kadri	Kaviraj	Hemanth Kumar	
Shyloo	"Ee Manasinalli"	Jassie Gift	Kaviraj	Jassie Gift	

=== 2012 ===
Film	Song	Composer(s)	Writer(s)	Co-singer(s)	Ref.
Arakshaka	"I'm A Barbie Girl"	Gurukiran	Kaviraj		
Breaking News	"Hudugi Baare"	Stephen Prayog	Nagathihalli Chandrashekhar	V. Harikrishna	
Sagar	"Koli Kodagana Nungittha"	Gurukiran	Kaviraj	Naveen	
Shiva	"Nee Odi Bandaga"	Gurukiran	Yogaraj Bhat	Baba Sehgal	
Super Shastri	"Puneeth Rajkumar Shivarajkumar"	Deva	K. Kalyan	Badri Prasad	

=== 2013 ===
Film	Song	Composer(s)	Writer(s)	Co-singer(s)	Ref.
Lakshmi	"Naanu Footpathnalli"	Gurukiran	Kaviraj	Shiva Rajkumar	
Lakshmi	"Pussy Cat"	Gurukiran	Kaviraj		
Gajendra	"Kalle Malle"	Rajesh Ramanath	Gururaj Hosakote		
Appayya	"Bombayalli"	S. Narayan	S. Narayan	Inchara Rao	
Jatta	"Huchh Munde"	Ashley Mendonca, Abhilash Lakra	B. M. Giriraj		
Dhanu	"Baluki Baluki Kulukuva"	B. R. Hemanth Kumar	Madev	Santosh	
Colours in Bangalore	"Eno Vishesha"	Jamesh	Santhosh	Ranjan Raj	

=== 2014 ===
Film	Song	Composer(s)	Writer(s)	Co-singer(s)	Ref.
Ninnindale	"Haaru Haaru"	Mani Sharma	Kaviraj	Sweekar	

=== 2015 ===
Film	Song	Composer(s)	Writer(s)	Co-singer(s)	Ref.
Ganapa	"Manglaarthi Madabyadri"	Karan B. Krupa	Shivu Bhergi, Chinmay		
Uppi 2	"Ivan Yaaro Different"	Gurukiran	Upendra	Nitin Rajaram Shastry	
A 2nd Hand Lover	"Are You Ready"	Gurukiran	Kaviraj	Girish Pradhan	

=== 2017 ===
Film	Song	Composer(s)	Writer(s)	Co-singer(s)	Ref.
Chowka	"Adoo Aata Adoo"	Gurukiran	Santosh Naik		

== Tamil songs ==
Year	Film	Song	Composer(s)	Writer(s)	Co-singer(s)
2006	Iruvar Mattum	Nenjil Enna'	Vijay Antony	Vairamuthu	Dwaraki Raghavan
2006	Iruvar Mattum	En Kaal Gal	Vijay Antony	Vairamuthu	
