= Yellow Flowers =

Indian film production company

Yellow Flowers India Private Limited
- Company type: Private
- Industry: Entertainment
- Founded: Hyderabad, Andhra Pradesh in 2011
- Headquarters: Hyderabad, India
- Key people: Ramesh Puppala; R. R. Venkat
- Products: Films
- Owner: Ramesh Puppala

Yellow Flowers is an Indian film production company established by Ramesh Puppala. The company is based in Hyderabad.

== Films produced ==
Year	Film	Actors	Director
2011	Mirapakay	Ravi Teja, Richa Gangopadhyay, Deeksha Seth	Harish Shankar
2012	Srimannarayana	Nandamuri Balakrishna, Isha Chawla, Parvati Melton	Ravikumar Chavali
2014	Paisa	Nani, Catherine Tresa	Krishna Vamsi
