= Ragini Dwivedi =

Indian actress

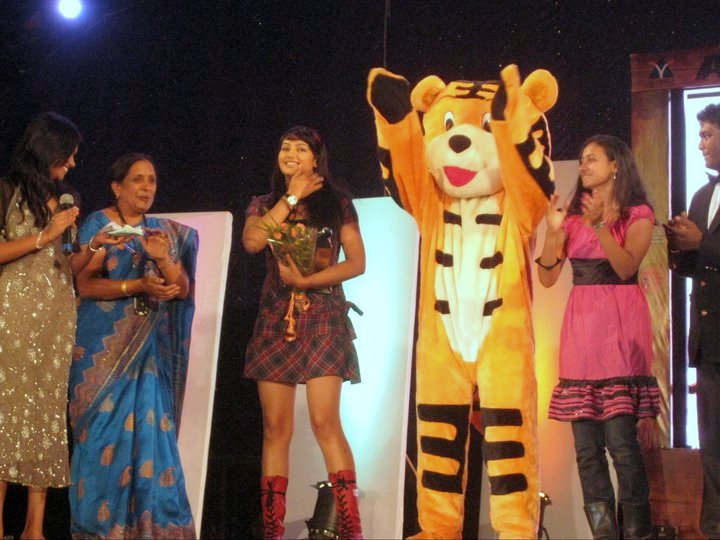
- Ragini Dwivedi at Acharya Habba
- Born: 24 May 1990 (age 36); Mhow, Madhya Pradesh, India
- Occupation: Actress
- Years active: 2009–present

Ragini Dwivedi (born 24 May 1990) is an Indian actress who works primarily in Kannada films. She made her debut with Veera Madakari (2009). She is a recipient of a SIIMA Award and an Udaya Film Award.

Dwivedi rose to fame starring in successful films: Kempe Gowda (2011), Shiva (2012), Bangari (2013) and Ragini IPS (2014), thus establishing herself as one of the leading actresses in Kannada cinema. She received Filmfare Award for Best Actress – Kannada nomination for Kempe Gowda and Ragini IPS and won the SIIMA Critics Award for Best Actress – Kannada for Shiva.

== Early life ==
Dwivedi was born on 24 May 1990 in Mhow, Madhya Pradesh and was brought up there. However, she has her roots in Rewari, Haryana. Her father Rakesh Kumar Dwivedi, born in Rewari, was a Colonel in the Indian Army and her mother Rohini, a housewife. Her paternal grandfather Pyare Lal Dwivedi was a railway guard in Rewari.

She was recognised by fashion designer, Prasad Bidapa in 2008 and introduced her to modelling. As a model, she modelled for Lakme Fashion Week, Sri Lanka fashion week and for designers like Rohit Bal, Tarun Tahiliani, Manish Malhotra, Ritu Kumar and Sabyasachi Mukherjee. She participated in the Femina Miss India contest held in Hyderabad in December 2008, where she was declared the first runner-up, thus receiving a direct entry to the 2009 Pantaloons Femina Miss India in Mumbai, where she was given the Richfeel Miss Beautiful Hair title.

== Career ==
=== Debut and breakthrough (2009–13) ===
Dwivedi made her acting debut with the Kannada film Veera Madakari in 2009. The action-comedy was a remake of the Telugu film Vikramarkudu and she was cast opposite Sudeep. The film became a major commercial success of the year. In the same year, she appeared in the film Gokula in a brief role. In 2010, she featured in five films out of which her Malayalam debut, Kandhahar, was one.

Dwivedi's career break came in 2011, with the action film, Kempegowda, with Sudeep as her co-star. She earned a nomination in the South Filmfare awards as a best female leading actress. The same year saw her in comic-capers such as Kalla Malla Sulla and Kaanchaana. The song Thuppa Beku Thuppa in Kalla Malla Sulla shot on her became a rage and one of the biggest hits of the year.

The year 2012 saw her featuring in films alongside leading male actors of Kannada cinema, with Upendra in Aarakshaka and with Shivarajkumar in Shiva. She received the award for the best actress in the critics' category for her performance in Shiva as well as in Arakshaka her role was highly appreciated. Her other film Villain also released in the same year. She then appeared in a Malayalam film titled Face2Face with Mammootty as her co-actor. She made special appearances in the films Victory and Prabhu Deva's Hindi film, R... Rajkumar.

=== Recent work (2014–present) ===
Dwivedi's first release of 2014 was a bilingual film known as Nimirndhu Nil in Tamil language and Janda Pai Kapiraju in Telugu, her first film in Telugu. Her second release of the year was Ragini IPS, the long delayed film. Cast as a police officer Ragini, the film marked her break from glamorous characters that she had a reputation for portraying. The film however opened to mixed reviews from film critics. However, it earned her, her second Filmfare Award for Best Actress nomination. Her next release was Namaste Madam, a remake of the 2002 Telugu film Missamma. Her performance as Radhika, chairperson of a multinational corporation playing as a seductress, received positive reviews from critics. Her first release of 2015, Shivam saw her appear in another glamorous role as a femme fatale, and as a parallel lead alongside Upendra.

As of April 2016, Dwivedi has completed filming Ranachandi is filming with Naane Next CM. She is also filming with Faisal Saif's multi-lingual film Amma. In preparation for her role in Naane Next CM, she shed 15 kg over a span of three months.

== Personal life and off-screen work ==
Since 2011, Dwivedi has been endorsing for Nandini Milk which is a product of Karnataka Milk Federation. In 2015, Dwivedi was made the brand ambassador of Times Asia Wedding Fair. The same year, at the India Leadership Conclave in Mumbai, she was honoured and awarded the Most Promising Face of Indian Cinema.

Ragini is passionate about the environment. She is brand ambassador of Hubballi Dharwad Municipal Corporation for the clean city campaign under the Swachh Bharat programme. She spoke about UV Index, alarming levels of UV and the need for environment initiatives.

== Controversy ==
=== Drug trafficking case ===
The Central Crime Branch (CCB) on 4 September 2020, conducted raids at Ragini Dwivedi's residence in Bengaluru in connection to the Sandalwood drug racket case. The CCB had intensified its investigation into a drugs haul in Bengaluru after the Narcotics Control Bureau (NCB) arrested three people from the city, who were allegedly supplying drugs to singers and actors in the Kannada film industry. She was arrested on 4 September 2020, after nearly seven hours of interrogation that happened at the CCB office. She and 11 other were charged under various sections of IPC including criminal conspiracy and Narcotic Drugs and Psychotropic Substances Act, 1985. She was granted bail after spending 140 days in prison. The drug case against Dwivedi and others was quashed by the Karnataka High Court on 14 January 2025 due to lack of evidence produced by the police.

== Filmography ==
=== Films ===
Key
†	Denotes films that have not yet been released

Year	Film	Role	Language	Notes
2009	Veera Madakari	Neeraja Goswami	Kannada	Suvarna Film Award for Best Debut Actress
2009	Gokula	Herself	Kannada	Special appearance
2010	Shankar IPS	Ashwini	Kannada	
2010	Gandedhe	Nandini	Kannada	
2010	Holi	Rathi	Kannada	
2010	Naayaka	Madhu	Kannada	
2010	Kandahar	Aishwarya	Malayalam	
2011	Kempegowda	Kavya	Kannada	Nominated—Filmfare Award for Best Actress – Kannada
2011	Kalla Malla Sulla	Khushboo	Kannada	
2011	Kaanchaana	Baby	Kannada	
2012	Aarakshaka	Maya	Kannada	
2012	Villain	Anu	Kannada	
2012	Shiva	Julie	Kannada	
2012	Ariyaan	Steffy	Tamil	
2012	Face2Face	Jayasree	Malayalam	
2013	Bangari	Paddhu	Kannada	
2013	Victory	Herself	Kannada	Special appearance
2013	R... Rajkumar	Herself	Hindi	Special appearance
2014	Nimirndhu Nil	Narasimha Reddy's girlfriend	Tamil	
2014	Ragini IPS	Ragini	Kannada	Nominated—Filmfare Award for Best Actress – Kannada
2014	Namaste Madam	Radhika	Kannada	
2015	Shivam	Mandira	Kannada	
2015	Janda Pai Kapiraju	Maya Kannan's girlfriend	Telugu	
2016	Parapancha	Kasturi	Kannada	
2016	Golisoda	Herself	Kannada	Special appearance
2017	Veera Ranachandi	Ragini	Kannada	
2018	Kicchu	Padmini	Kannada	
2018	MMCH	Jhansi Rani	Kannada	
2018	The Terrorist	Reshma	Kannada	
2019	Adyaksha in America	Nandhini	Kannada	
2023	Sheela	Sheela	Kannada	
2023	Kick	Sheela	Tamil	Special appearance
2024	E-mail	Abhi	Tamil	
2025	Sanju Weds Geetha 2	Lorthi	Kannada	Special appearance
2025	Gajarama	Saaraayi Shanthamma	Kannada	Special appearance
2025	Hridayapoorvam	Dancer	Malayalam	Cameo in the song "Tuk Tuk Tuk Tu"
2025	Vrusshabha	Queen Triloka / Leela Devi	Telugu	Partially reshot in Malayalam
2026	Police Complaint	Sara	Telugu	
2026	Sarkari Nyayabele Angadi	Parvathy	Kannada	
2026	Bingo	Adithi	Kannada	
TBA	Sorry – Karma Returns †	TBA	Kannada	

=== Web series ===
Year	Title	Roles	Language	Notes
2025	Chhal Kapat	Mehek	Hindi	
