= Mr. Theertha =

- Film poster
- Directed by: Sadhu Kokila
- Written by: Sadhu Kokila
- Based on: Spadikam (1995)
- Produced by: Sriram; M. Kumar
- Starring: Sudeep; Saloni Aswani; Anant Nag; Doddanna
- Cinematography: Dasari Srinivas Rao
- Edited by: Joni Harsha
- Music by: Gurukiran
- Release date: 25 June 2010
- Running time: 129 minutes
- Country: India
- Language: Kannada

Mr. Theertha is a 2010 Indian Kannada-language action drama film directed by Sadhu Kokila. It is a remake of the 1995 Malayalam film Spadikam. The film stars Sudeep, Saloni Aswani and Anant Nag in the lead roles. The music was composed by Gurukiran. The film was dubbed into Telugu as Rowdy Simha and into Hindi as Rowdy Shankar in 2013.

It is a story of young man, estranged from his narcissistic father, upon failing to meet the latter's high expectations for intellectual pursuits.

== Plot ==
Narayana Shastri, a school headmaster (Anant Nag), is never happy with his son, Theertha (Sudeep), and always degrades him. However, having had enough of him, Theertha runs away from home only to return as a gangster after long.

== Cast ==
- Sudeep as Tiger Theertha
- Saloni Aswani as Nayana, Theertha's love interest
- Anant Nag as Master Narayana Shastri, Theertha's father
- Geetha as Annapoorna, Theertha's mother
- Doddanna as Theertha's maternal uncle
- Avinash
- Sadhu Kokila as Theertha's friend
- Rekha
- Neenasam Ashwath
- Kuri Prathap as Theertha's sidekick
- Vidya Venkataram
- Shobharaj as Sub Inspector
- Venki
- R. G. Vijayasarathy
- Prashanth Parthasarathi
- Bank Suresh

== Production ==
=== Title name change ===
On 12 November 2009, director Sadhu Kokila has quietly changed the title of his film Teertha to Mr Teertha.

== Soundtrack ==
Mr. Theertha

Soundtrack album by Gurukiran
- Released: 2010
- Length: 18:41
- Language: Kannada
- Label: Anand Audio
- Producer: Gurukiran

Gurukiran chronology
Shankar IPS (2010)	Mr. Theertha (2010)	Mylari (2010)

The film's soundtrack was composed by Gurukiran with lyrics penned by Hrudaya Shiva and Kaviraj.

Track#	Song	Singer(s)
1	"Machchi Machchi"	Gurukiran
2	"Kichcha Ninage"	Gurukiran, Apoorva
3	"Olave Olave"	Chetan Sosca, Shamitha Malnad
4	"Hudugi Hudugi "	Karthik, Chaitra H. G.

== Reception ==
=== Critical response ===
A critic from The Times of India scored the film at 2.5 out of 5 stars and says "Sudeep plays a remarkable role with brilliant expressions. Soumya overtakes Saloni with her performance. Anant Nag is simply superb. While Dasari Srinivasa Rao has handled the camera well, the music by Gurukiran is good but fails to register". A critic from The New Indian Express wrote "Sudeep has also acted well. It is pleasant to see beautiful Saloni who played one of the heroines in Upendra’s ‘Budhivantha’. Geetha and Avinash provide good support and Rekha proves her mettle as a villain". A critic from Bangalore Mirror wrote "The film has a quick narrative and is a good watch overall. Sonali, who returns after her small role in Buddivantha, has a pleasing presence. The songs and camerawork are pleasant.Nanjangud as the backdrop, though not acknowledged in the story, is a welcome change. Teertha is a film you can without doubt, enjoy".

== Awards and nominations ==
Suvarna Film Awards :-

- Best Director - Nominated - Sadhu Kokila
