= Mirapakay =

- Theatrical release poster
- Directed by: Harish Shankar
- Screenplay by: Ramesh Reddy; A. Deepak Raj; Vikram Sirikonda
- Dialogues by: Harish Shankar
- Story by: Harish Shankar
- Produced by: Ramesh Puppala
- Starring: Ravi Teja; Richa Gangopadhyay; Deeksha Seth; Prakash Raj
- Cinematography: C. Ram Prasad
- Edited by: Gautham Raju
- Music by: S. Thaman
- Production company: Yellow Flowers
- Distributed by: R. R. Movie Makers
- Release date: 13 January 2011
- Running time: 160 minutes
- Country: India
- Language: Telugu
- Box office: ₹17 crore distributors' share

Mirapakay (transl. Chilli) is a 2011 Indian Telugu-language action comedy film directed by Harish Shankar and produced by Ramesh Puppala under Yellow Flowers. The film stars Ravi Teja in the lead role, alongside Richa Gangopadhyay, Deeksha Seth, Prakash Raj, Kota Srinivasa Rao and Nagababu in supporting roles. The music was composed by S. Thaman, while cinematography and editing were handled by C. Ram Prasad and Gautham Raju.

Mirapakay was released on 13 January 2011, coinciding with Makara Sankranti, and became a commercial success at the box office.

== Plot ==
Rishi alias Mirapakay, an IB officer, is assigned by IB chief Murthy to nab Shankar, who is the agent of Kittu, a crime boss, as Kittu is planning to spread his operations in the country. Rishi finds Shankar's location in Hyderabad and goes undercover as a college lecturer. Rishi meets Vinamra, who also studies in the college where Rishi is the lecturer. Rishi and Vinamra soon fall in love with each other. Rishi learns from Murthy that Vaishali, Kittu's daughter, also studies at the same college. Murthy asks Rishi to extract information about Kittu from Vaishali. Rishi makes Vaishali fall for him and reaches Kittu after killing Shankar and Linga. Rishi finally arrests Kittu and his gang, where he meets Vinamra, explains to her that Vaishali meant nothing to him and convinces her to marry him.

== Cast ==
- Ravi Teja as Rishikesha "Rishi"/ Mirapakay
- Richa Gangopadhyay as Panditharadhyula Vinamra
- Deeksha Seth as Vaishali
- Prakash Raj as Kittu, Vaishali's father
- Kota Srinivasa Rao as Shankar
- Nagababu as Narayana Murthy
- Sunil as Charukesha
- Ali as Al Pacino
- Sanjay Swaroop as ACP Srinivas
- Ajay as Kittu's son
- Supreeth as Linga, Shankar's son
- Chandra Mohan as Vishwanath Shastri, Vinamra's father
- Sudha as Vinamra's mother
- Brahmaji as Ram Gupta
- Dharmavarapu Subramanyam as Amma Subramanyam
- Rao Ramesh as college principal
- Surekha Vani as college principal's wife
- Praveen
- Fish Venkat
- Narsing Yadav
- Karate Kalyani
- Swati Reddy in a cameo appearance

== Production ==
After the commercial disappointment of Shock, Harish Shankar faced struggles in his career and narrated the script of Mirapakay in the title Romantic Rishi to Pawan Kalyan, After listening to interval episode, Pawan Kalyan agreed to star in the project, but the project did not materialise due to certain reasons. It was Ravi Teja, who gave Harish's birth and rebirth as a director. During the shooting time of Shock, Ravi Teja said that he would do another film with him irrespective of the commercial outcome of the film. Harish Shankar was feeling guilty and did not approach him. Ravi Teja called him and asked for a story, where he narrated the script of Mirapakay. Richa Gangopadhyay was signed after Harish Shankar had noticed her at the success party of her previous film Leader. Harish Shankar initially offered her the role played by Deeksha as she was an NRI. When they met to review the script, Harish was convinced that she would do justice to the character of Vinamra, a traditional Brahmin girl.

== Soundtrack ==
Mirapakay

Soundtrack album by S. Thaman
- Released: 12 November 2010
- Recorded: 2010–2011
- Genre: Feature film soundtrack
- Length: 26:25
- Language: Telugu
- Label: Aditya Music
- Producer: S. Thaman

S. Thaman chronology
Ragada (2010)	Mirapakay (2010)	Mambattiyan (2011)

The audio of the film was launched on 5 December 2010 at Taj Deccan Hotel, Hyderabad. T. G. Venkatesh, Ram Gopal Varma and Atchi Reddy launched audio cassettes, CDs and trailers respectively. D. Ramanaidu, S. S. Rajamouli, V. V. Vinayak, Gopichand Malineni, Vamsi Paidipally, Chandra Bose and others attended the function. The songs "Vaishali", "Silakaa" and "Dhinaku Dhin" were reused by Thaman in Tamil films Osthe and Ishtam respectively.

Track-List
No.	Title	Lyrics	Singer(s)	Length
1.	"Adigora Choodu"	Anantha Sreeram	Rahul Nambiar, Ravi Teja, Karthik, Aalap Raju, Ranjith	4:12
2.	"Vaishali Vaishali"	Bhaskarabhatla	S. Thaman	4:22
3.	"Gadi Thalupula"	Sirivennela Seetharama Sastry	Geetha Madhuri, Karthik, S. Thaman	4:48
4.	"Silakaa"	Bhaskarabhatla Ravi Kumar	K. S. Chithra, Rahul Nambiar	4:39
5.	"Dhinaku Dhin"	Chandrabose	Shankar Mahadevan, Shreya Ghoshal	4:46
6.	"Chirugaley"	Sahithi	Rita Thyagarajan, Megha, Janani, Sravana Bhargavi, Vardhini, Ranjith, Naveen Madhav	2:22
7.	"Mirapakaay"	Harish Shankar	Ranjith, Rita Thyagarajan	1:16
Total length:				26:25

== Release ==
Mirapakay was released on 13 January 2011, coinciding with Makara Sankranti. The film has been dubbed in Hindi as Khallas and into Tamil as Murattu Singam.

== Reception ==
Sify wrote "Despite a banal storyline, the film has entertainment value, punch and a decent presentation. This Ravi Teja starrer comes as a pucca mass entertainer for Sankranthi." Telugu Cinema wrote "If you are not tired of seeing Ravi Teja doing same role again and again, showing off same histrionics without much variation, then Mirapakay may seem time-pass one." Idlebrain wrote "It is a proven fact that Ravi Teja’s movies have scant respect for story and screenplay and majorly depend on the entertainment aspect."
