= A 2nd Hand Lover =

2015 Kannada romance film

- Film poster
- Directed by: Raghav Marasur
- Written by: Raghava Loki
- Produced by: Manjunath V
- Starring: Ajay Rao; Pranitha Subhash
- Cinematography: K. S. Chandrashekar
- Edited by: Deepu S. Kumar
- Music by: Gurukiran
- Production company: S. V. Productions
- Release date: 25 September 2015
- Country: India
- Language: Kannada

A 2nd Hand Lover is a 2015 Indian Kannada language romance film directed by Raghav Marasur (Raghava Loki). It stars Ajay Rao, Pranitha Subhash and Anisha Ambrose. The film is about the life of a rock star. The plot is loosely based on the 2004 South Korean film 100 Days with Mr. Arrogant.

== Plot ==
An aspiring rockstar with his own band, Ajai (Ajay Rao) comes to Bangalore from his town. He aspires to make it big in the rock music industry. At the same time, he nurses his broken heart for losing his girlfriend (Pranitha) in an accident. He prepares his band to perform in a competition held in Bangalore. He meets Anjali (Anisha), a college student who breaks his car's side view mirror, by accident while traveling. Following several similar encounters, Anjali eventually develops feelings for Ajai. But Ajai, having a sad past of lost love, is reluctant to reciprocate his love for Anjali. The rest of the plot is about how Anjali wins over Ajai.

== Cast ==
- Ajay Rao as Ajai
- Anisha Ambrose as Anjali
- Pranitha Subhash as herself
- Sadhu Kokila
- Ramakrishna
- Vijayakashi
- Sanketh Kashi
- Padmaja Rao

== Reception ==
The film received moderated positive reviews. Times of India gave 2.5 stars out of 5 and stated, "The film could have been a clincher, for it has all the elements of a family drama, had it been shorter. Though, watch it once, if you must."

== Soundtrack ==
A 2nd Hand Lover

Soundtrack album by Gurukiran
- Released: 29 May 2015
- Genre: Feature film soundtrack
- Length: 25:59
- Label: Anand Audio
- Producer: Gurukiran

Gurukiran composed the film's background score and music for its soundtrack. The soundtrack album was released on 29 May 2015 and consists of six tracks.

Tracklist
No.	Title	Lyrics	Singer(s)	Length
1.	"Are You Ready"	Kaviraj	Girish Pradhan, Chaitra H. G.	4:52
2.	"Neenillada Nanalli"	Kaviraj	Gurukiran	5:12
3.	"Yede Chuchho Chori"	Kaviraj	Vyasaraj	3:56
4.	"Olava Shalege"	Santhosh Naik	Ritisha Padmanabh	4:08
5.	"Chooru Jaga"	Kaviraj	Aishwarya Kashinathan	4:24
6.	"Bikeali Petrol Khali"	Chandan Shetty	Chetan Sosca, Chandan Shetty	4:07
Total length:				25:59
