= Bikram Singha: The Lion Is Back =

2012 Indian Bengali film by Rajiv Kumar Biswas

- Film Poster
- Directed by: Rajiv Kumar Biswas
- Screenplay by: Pele Bhattacharya
- Story by: V. Vijayendra Prasad
- Produced by: Ashoke Kumar Dhanuka; Himanshu Dhanuka
- Starring: Prosenjit Chatterjee; Richa Gangopadhyay; Supriyo Dutta
- Edited by: Rabiranjan Moitra
- Music by: Bappi Lahiri; Shree Pritam
- Distributed by: Eskay Movies
- Release date: 25 May 2012
- Country: India
- Language: Bengali

Bikram Singha is a 2012 Indian Bengali-language action film directed by Rajib Biswas. A remake of the 2006 Telugu-language film Vikramarkudu, it stars Prosenjit Chatterjee in a double role along with Richa Gangopadhyay (in her only Bengali film till date) & Anusmriti Sarkar. Bollywood actress Mahek Chahal did an item song in this film, marking her Bengali debut.

The film received an "A" certificate from the Central Board of Film Certification. The film was dubbed into Hindi Language as Ek Rowdy Bikram.

== Plot ==
Gupi is a small-time conman in love with Madhu, a pretty woman whom he met at a wedding he wasn't invited to. Into this picture enters six-year-old Osmita, who inexplicably believes Gupi to be her dad. And if this wasn't bad enough, Gupi becomes the object of a series of life-threatening attacks by a gang of criminals who seem to know something he doesn't.

While trying desperately to save his life and love, Gupi stumbles upon a deadly secret. A secret that will take him to a small town named Debgarh: A town terrorized by its ruthless MLA and the mafia he controls; a town whose inhabitants' only hope for redemption is Gupi.

Later, he learns that ACP Bikram Singha Roy, his look alike, is in danger from criminals.

== Cast ==
- Prosenjit Chatterjee in a dual role as
  - ACP Bikram Singha Roy Amar Nath
  - Gupi, the Thief
- Richa Gangopadhyay as Madhu
- Anusmriti Sarkar as Ritwika Mitro
- Partho Sarathi Chakraborty as Bagha
- Ashmee Ghosh as Baby Titli
- Supriyo Datta as Kali
- Besant Ravi as Rahu
- Surajit Sen as Munna
- Prodyot Mukherjee as Madhu's Father
- Sanghasri Sinha Mitra as Srimoti

=== Cameo appearances ===
- Sabyasachi Chakrabarty as Police Commissioner/or Director General of Police (Special Appearance)
- Debjani Chattopadhyay as Bikram's deceased wife (portrait)
- Mahek Chahal (special appearance in item song "Na Champa Na Chameli")

== Soundtrack ==
| No. | Title | Music | Artist(s) | Length |
|---|---|---|---|---|
| 1. | "Dhin Tak Na" | Bappi Lahiri | Bappi Lahiri | 3:58 |
| 2. | "Guti Guti Paye" | | Shaan, Mahalakshmi Iyer | 4:19 |
| 3. | "Na Champa Na Chameli" | | Mamta Sharma | 4:12 |
| 4. | "Saat Paake Bandha" | | Kumar Sanu, Alka Yagnik | 5:28 |
| 5. | "Dhuan Dhuan" | | Shaan, Mahalakshmi Iyer | 4:05 |
| 6. | "Lori" | | Saberi Bhattacharya | 3:43 |
| Total length: | | | | 25:45 |
