= R. R. Venkat =

Indian film producer (died 2021)

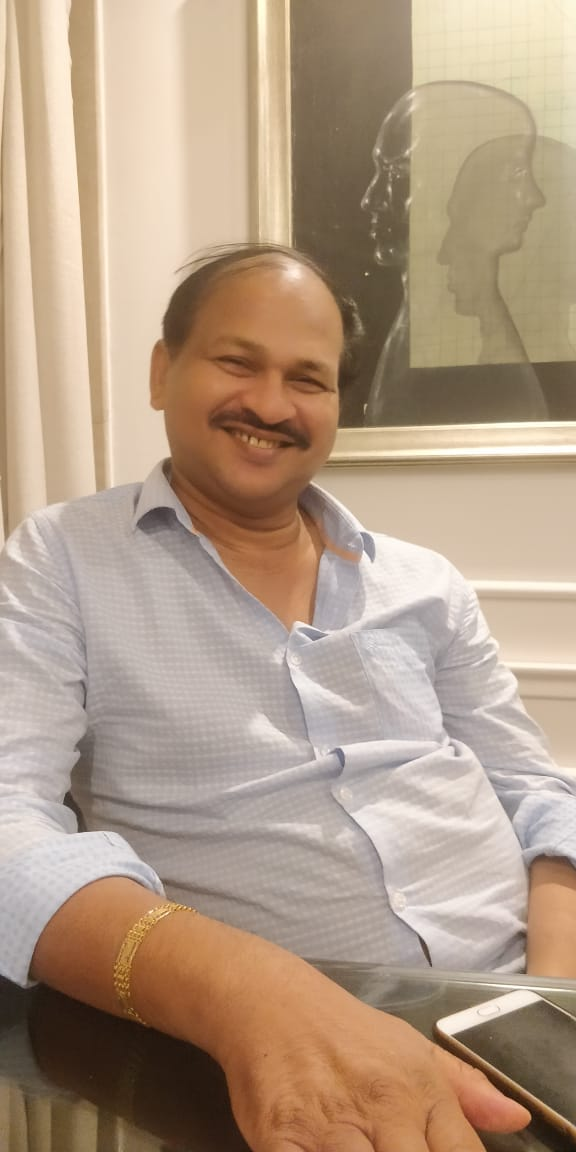
- R R Venkat
- Born: Venkat Phanindra Reddy; 1966/1967
- Died: 27 September 2021; Hyderabad, India
- Occupation(s): Producer, Distributor, Social Worker

R. R. Venkat (1966/1967 – 27 September 2021) was an Indian film producer known primarily for his works in Telugu cinema. He owned and produced films under the production house, R. R. Movie Makers.

== Career ==
In 2011, Venkat Reddy received an honorary doctorate from the open International University for Complementary Medicines at University of Colombo for his contributions as a social worker.

He also made his foray into Hollywood with the 2012 English movie Divorce Invitation starring Jonathan Bennett directed by veteran S. V. Krishna Reddy which is a remake of S. V. Krishna Reddy's Srikanth and Ramya Krishnan starrer Aahwanam.

Venkat Reddy died from a kidney-related ailment on 27 September 2021, in Hyderabad, aged 54.

== Filmography ==
=== Producer ===
Year	Title	Notes
2004	Andhrawala	
2004	Ek Hasina Thi	Hindi film
2005	James	Hindi film
2006	Maayajaalam	
2006	Samanyudu	
2007	Gundamma Gaari Manavadu	
2007	Bahumati	
2008	Victory	
2009	Kick	
2010	Don Seenu	
2011	Mirapakay	
2011	Prema Kavali	
2012	Businessman	
2012	Poola Rangadu	
2012	Lovely	
2012	Divorce Invitation	
2012	Damarukam	
2014	Paisa	
2014	Autonagar Surya	
