= Dhana 51 =

- Directed by: Surya Kiran
- Written by: Surya Kiran
- Dialogues by: Ravi; Surya Kiran
- Produced by: M. L. Kumar Chowdary
- Starring: Sumanth; Saloni Aswani; Mukesh Khanna
- Cinematography: S. Arun Kumar
- Edited by: Marthand K. Venkatesh
- Music by: Chakri
- Production company: Sri Keerthi Creations
- Release date: 14 January 2005
- Country: India
- Language: Telugu

Dhana 51 is a 2005 Indian Telugu-language romantic action film directed by R. Soorya Kiran and starring Sumanth and Saloni Aswani with Mukesh Khanna in a negative role. Structural similarities were found between the plot of this movie and the 2008 Kannada film Bindaas penned by Janardhana Maharshi.

== Cast ==
- Sumanth as Dhananjay a.k.a. Dhana
- Saloni Aswani as Lakshmi
- Mukesh Khanna as Mahesh Chandra
- Tanikella Bharani
- Dharmavarapu Subramanyam as Dhana's father
- Rajakumar
- Mallikarjuna Rao
- Kanta Rao
- Ali
- Delhi Rajeswari
- Radha Kumar
- Gautam Raju
- Gundu Hanumantha Rao
- Surya Kiran (guest appearance)
- Kalyani (guest appearance)

== Production ==
After the success of Satyam, R. Soorya Kiran, Sumanth and Chakri reunited for this film. The title was changed from 51 to Dhana 51 because Sumanth's previous films named after the hero's character (Satyam and Gowri) were box office successes. This film marks the Telugu debut of Mumbai-based Saloni Aswani and Shaktimaan-fame Mukesh Khanna.

== Soundtrack ==
Music by Chakri.

- "Aravirisina Mogga" – Chakri
- "Avunanave Avunani" - P. Unnikrishnan
- "China Goda" – Kousalya, Shankar Mahadevan
- "Dhana 51" – Soorya Kiran, Vasu, Vishwa, Lahari
- "I Am In Love" – Anitha
- "Kovaa Kovaa" – Balaji, Gowri Srinivas, Matin, Pallavi, Ravi Varma, Soorya Kiran, Vasu, Kameshwari

== Release and reception ==
The film released on 14 January 2005 coinciding with Sankranthi.

Jeevi of Idlebrain.com gave the film a rating of 2.5 out of 5 and opined that "Dhana 51 suffers with inadequate screenplay, uneven narration and confused characterization. Dhana 51 is most unexpected from a director who made his debut with Satyam film". Ravi Kalaga of Full Hyderabad wrote that "A remake in the essence, albeit with changes in the locations, songs, sidekicks and vocations of the actors, Dhana is essentially a cut-copy-paste version of their earlier enterprise [Satyam], with new fonts and colors (literally!)".
