= Villain (2012 film) =

- Film poster
- Directed by: M. S. Ramesh
- Produced by: Yogish Hunsur
- Starring: Auditya; Ragini Dwivedi
- Cinematography: Dasari Seenu
- Edited by: S. Manohar
- Music by: Gurukiran
- Production company: Saraswathi Entertainers
- Release date: 25 May 2012
- Country: India
- Language: Kannada

Villain (Kannada: ವಿಲನ್) is a 2012 Indian Kannada-language action film written and directed by M. S. Ramesh and produced by Yogish Hunsur under the banner Saraswathi Entertainers. The film stars Aditya and Ragini Dwivedi in lead roles.

== Cast ==
- Auditya as Tippu
- Ragini Dwivedi as Anu
- Rangayana Raghu
- Avinash
- Shobhraj
- Malathi Sardespande
- Simran
- Chikkanna

== Production ==
Villain, which was shot mostly in Mysore and surrounding areas, was given U/A certificate by the regional censor board. The film was originally titled Rebel.

== Soundtrack ==
Villain

Soundtrack album by Gurukiran
- Released: 2012
- Recorded: 2012
- Genre: Feature film soundtrack
- Language: Kannada

Official audio
- Villain - Full Album on YouTube

No.	Title	Lyrics	Singer(s)	Length
1.	"Operation Kamala"	Kaviraj	Malgudi Subha, Chorus
2.	"Kannalle Sambashane"	Jayanth Kaikini	Rajesh Krishnan, Anuradha Bhat
3.	"Gelathi Ninninda"	Santhosh Naik	Kailash Kher
4.	"Illa Annutha Naanu"	Jayanth Kaikini	Srini, Jayanth Kaikini
5.	"Garam Masale"	Gurukiran	Jassie Gift, Shibani Kashyap
6.	"Kannalle Sambashane"	Jayanth Kaikini	Rajesh Krishnan

== Reception ==
=== Critical response ===
A critic from The Times of India scored the film at 3 out of 5 stars and says "Auditya is superb with his dialogue delivery and expressions. Romantic Ragini is lively as a lover girl. Rangayana and Shobhraj give life to their roles. Dharma impresses you as a police officer. Senior artiste Pushpa Swamy wins applause in one sequence with brilliant dialogue delivery. Music by Gurukiran is average". A critic from The New Indian Express wrote "Dharma’s role of cop is quite good. Gurukiran has nothing new to offer in his music. Technically, Dasari Seenu has done a good job, but could not stand throughout the film". A critic from DNA wrote "Gurukiran’s music is good and the song, Garam Masaala has all the right ingredients to entertain the front benchers. Go watch Villain if you absolutely have no other alternative to spend your time". S Viswanath from Deccan Herald wrote "What is shocking is that Rajanna and Tippu have their way right under the long arm of the law, Vikram Singh. How, despite his good intentions, Tippu turns a villain in Anu’s eyes forms the rest of the film. Nothing works in Villain except Ragini". A critic from Bangalore Mirror wrote "Dharma has nothing much to do in his police uniform while most of the other actors are just props. Evidently, the story needed a bigger canvas. The producer should have taken a partner early on".
