= Banna Bannada Loka =

- Film poster
- Directed by: Ram Prasad
- Written by: Ram Prasad
- Produced by: Krishnappa
- Starring: Ram Prasad
- Cinematography: Chandara sekar
- Edited by: Seenu
- Music by: Thomas Rathnam
- Production company: Balaji studios
- Release date: 22 July 2011
- Country: India
- Language: Kannada

Banna Bannada Loka (Colorful world) is a 2011 Indian Kannada-language romance film written and directed by Ram Prasad. The film will star Ram Prasad and Shravani along with Rangayana Raghu and Rekha. The story of the film revolves around a youngster from a Mangalore-based Kannada family. The happy-go-lucky man's life undergoes a sudden turn. The decisions he takes after that is the rest of the story. The film is produced by Krishnappa and features background score and soundtrack composed by Thomas Rathnam with cinematography handled by Chandra Sekar. The film, which commenced production in 2009 and released on 2011.

== Cast ==
- Ram Prasad
- Meghna
- Shravani
- Arpana Prabhu
- Rangayana Raghu

== Production ==
=== Filming ===
Filmed in and around Bangalore, Mysore, Mangalore and Andaman.

== Soundtrack ==
Banna Bannada Loka

Soundtrack album by Thomas Rathnam
- Released: 22 April 2011
- Recorded: 2010 – 2011
- Genre: Feature film soundtrack
- Language: Kannada
- Label: Anand Audio
- Producer: Thomas Rathnam

Thomas Rathnam chronology
Karuvarai Pookkal (2010)	Banna Bannada Loka (2011)	Parvathy Pura (2012)

Thomas Rathnam composed the soundtrack, teaming up with Ram Prasad for the first time. The soundtrack album consists of seven tracks. The lyrics were written by Kavi Kempagiri, Suresh Keerthi, Ram Prasad and Ubasya. Reports stating that S. P. Balasubrahmanyam sang one song, which is the greatest lifetime hit. "E Loka" a song about the pathetic life style of the cine field people. Ultimately a fast song "Kanasina Marata" sung by Gurukiran is the optimistic song for the youth, who wish to achieve some thing in their life.

Tracklist
No.	Title	Lyrics	Singer(s)	Length
1.	"E Loka"	Kavi kempagiri	S. P. Balasubrahmanyam	05:17
2.	"Kanasina maratta"	Upasya	Gurukiran, j.Kevin jason	04:54
3.	"Anku tongu"	Ram Prasad	Hemanth	04:02
4.	"Kaldode ninna nodi"	Ram Prasad	Vijay Prakash, Chaitra H. G.	04:46
5.	"Olave matra"	Suresh Kirthi	Chaitra H.G, Priya	04:47
6.	"Kaldo de"	Ram Prasad	Dr.Vincent Theraisnathan, Chaitra.H.G.	04:01
7.	"Dance Theme music"		Thomas Rathnam	03:20
Total length:				46:12

== Reception ==
=== Critical response ===
B S Srivani from Deccan Herald wrote "The surprise package is Moggina Manasu Harsha, who is wasted. It is evident the team doesn't have a clue about anything. Neither Chandrashekhar nor T A Thomas have much to do. Every year during Holi time, people are warned about the harmful effects of colours. Alas, that holds true here as well!". A critic from News18 India wrote "The two heroines - Meghana Gowda and Shravani - do not make any impact. Even a good actress like Rekha Kumar fails to do justice to her role. Watching "Banna Bannada Loka" is sheer torture".
