= Police Complaint =

2026 Indian Kannada language horror thriller film

- Directed by: Sanjeev Megoti
- Written by: Sanjeev Megoti
- Produced by: Makineni Krishna Sai
- Starring: Varalaxmi Sarathkumar; Naveen Chandra; Ragini Dwivedi
- Cinematography: S.N.Hareesh
- Edited by: Anugoju Renukababu
- Music by: Arohana Sudhindra; Sudhakar Mario; Sanjeev Megoti
- Production company: MSK Pramidha Shee Films
- Release date: 12 June 2026
- Running time: 156 minutes
- Country: India
- Language: Telugu

Police Complaint is a 2026 Indian Telugu-language horror thriller film directed by Sanjeev Megoti. The film stars Varalaxmi Sarathkumar, Naveen Chandra, and Ragini Dwivedi in lead roles. Directed by Sanjeev Megoti, the film was produced by MSK Pramidha Shee Films.

== Cast ==
- Varalaxmi Sarathkumar
- Naveen Chandra
- Ragini Dwivedi
- Krishna Sai
- Babloo Prithiveeraj
- Gemini Suresh
- Saptagiri
- Srinivasa Reddy
- Aditya Om
- Amit Tiwari
- Rajshri Nair
- Sharath Lohithaswa

== Production ==
The project was officially announced through a first-look poster released in May 2025. Production of the film was completed in 2025. In March 2026, reports confirmed that actress Ragini Dwivedi joined the cast of the film. A film teaser was released in May 2026. The film will include a tribute song for Krishna Sai, who will feature in the film posthumously.

== Release ==
The film is released on 12 June 2026.

== Reception ==
Sanjana Pulugurtha of The Times of India said that "What ultimately holds the film back is that it never fully commits to either its crime-thriller instincts or its horror elements. The setup promises a layered mystery steeped in superstition and secrets, but the payoff settles for safer territory." Bhargav Chaganti of NTV Telugu said that "The "Chain Reaction of Karma" concept chosen by director Sanjeev Megoti is very good. The way he balanced the mystery elements on one side while driving horror and action on the other side is impressive."
