= Saawan... The Love Season =

2006 film by Sawaan Kumar Tak

Sawaan... The Love Season
- Poster
- Directed by: Saawan Kumar Tak
- Written by: Saawan Kumar Tak
- Produced by: Saawan Kumar Tak
- Starring: Saloni Aswani; Kapil Jhaveri; Salman Khan
- Cinematography: C. Rajendra Prasad
- Music by: Aadesh Shrivastava; Sajid–Wajid
- Release date: 7 April 2006
- Running time: 120 minutes
- Country: India
- Language: Hindi

Saawan... The Love Season is a 2006 Indian Hindi-language romance film directed by Saawan Kumar. The film stars Saloni Aswani, Kapil Jhaveri, Ranjeet, Prem Chopra, and Salman Khan in a special appearance.

== Plot ==
Saawan... The Love Season tells the story of a couple, Raj and Kajal. They get married, and when they return from their honeymoon in Patiala, Kajal encounters a man who predicts the future. Whether it's the death of a person at 9 p.m. or a major accident on the Mumbai-Pune Expressway, the man knows it all. He is a modern-day Nostradamus. When Kajal asks him about her future, he tells her she will die two days later. Kajal is shattered and tells Raj, who swears that if anything happens to her, he will kill the man. On the fateful day, Kajal is mistakenly shot by police officers outside a shopping mall and dies. Raj blames the man for it, breaks into his house, assaults him, and the man dies. As the man dies, he predicts his own death. When the man dies, Kajal, who had been pronounced dead, wakes up. She is now alive. She falls in love with Raj all over again, and with the help of Raj's friend Funsukh and his admirer, the couple remarries and lives happily ever after.

== Cast ==
- Salman Khan as Sameer (special appearance)
- Kapil Jhaveri as Raj
- Saloni Aswani as Kajal F. Kapoor / a.k.a. Kajal F. Cappar
- Prem Chopra as Fakirchand "Fakki Cappar" Kapoor
- Ranjeet as Raj's dad
- Sheela David as Ranjeet's mom
- Johnny Lever as Funsukh
- Bobby Darling as Funsukh's Admirer
- Kiran Rathod as herself
- Javed Akbar as Doctor
- Sapna as Kajal's sister

== Soundtrack ==
- Punjabi Ankhonwali - Shaan, Sunidhi Chauhan
- Tu Mila De - Sonu Nigam music composer Sajid–Wajid
- Ready for Love - Vasundhara Das
- Saawan...... The Love Season - Sunidhi Chauhan, Shaan
- Jo Maangi Khuda se - Kunal Ganjawala
- Mere Dil Ko Dil Ki Dhadkan Ko - Shaan, Shreya Ghoshal
- Jo Maangi Khuda Se (Female) - Jaspinder Narula

== Reception ==
Taran Adarsh of IndiaFM gave the film 1 out of 5, writing, "On the whole, SAAWAN - THE LOVE SEASON is a weak fare, which has some scope at the single screens and in the Hindi belt primarily due to Salman's star presence. That's it! Patcy N of Rediff gave the film 1 out of 5, writing, "Saaawan is full of flaws. It is also badly written and badly directed. The choreography is bearable but the music is lousy. The two newcomers – Aswani and Jhaveri – put in okay performances."
