= Paisa (2014 film) =

- Movie poster
- Directed by: Krishna Vamsi
- Written by: Padmasri; K. K. Benoji; Patrikeya
- Produced by: Ramesh Puppala
- Starring: Nani; Catherine
- Cinematography: Santosh Rai Pathaje
- Edited by: M. Thiyagarajan
- Music by: Sai Karthik
- Production company: Yellow Flowers
- Release date: 7 February 2014
- Running time: 144 mins
- Country: India
- Language: Telugu
- Budget: ₹20 crores
- Box office: est.₹22.34 crores

Paisa is a 2014 Indian Telugu-language action comedy film directed by Krishna Vamsi, produced by Ramesh Puppala under Yellow Flowers banner, featuring Nani and Catherine in the lead. It was written by Padmasri, K. K. Binojee and Patrikeya. It deals with the power of money and how the whole world revolves around it.

The film was scheduled to release on 20 December 2013 with an 'A' certificate from the censor board for its excessive violence and profanity. However, the film released worldwide on 7 February 2014.

Upon release, the film received mixed reviews from the critics and audience, alike. It was a flop at the box office.

== Plot ==
Kalamoorthy, a minister of Andhra Pradesh Cabinet, is removed from his post after the Central Bureau of Investigation proves his involvement in liquor mafia, and the Election Commission of India declares the first by-election after the main elections of that term in that constituency. While a senior ruling party leader Saradhi is willing to spend ₹25 crore for the election, other senior members ask Sanyasi Naidu to shell out ₹50 crores, and if he wins in the by election, he would become the Chief Minister of AP. Since it is his ambition to rule the state, Sanyasi Naidu accepts to spend ₹50 crores. With the help of his trusted aid, the Assistant Commissioner of Police (ACP), Sanyasi Naidu brings ₹50 crores to India through Hawala transaction into Old City in Hyderabad. The ACP is tasked with transporting the money to the constituency. On completion of the task and if Sanyasi Naidu becomes the Chief Minister, then the ACP would be promoted as Inspector General (IG) of Police. The ACP goes to the Old City to collect the amount, and the money is wrapped in big black plastic bags and is placed in the deck lid of a black Toyota Innova.

Another story runs parallel to the above plot. Prakash is a model of an Old city sherwani firm who dreams to become rich. He has such an obsession for money that he often pronounces his name as "Pra-cash". He has two friends: Tabar, a cab driver, and Gokul. Noor, who also works in the same firm, is in love with him. However, as Prakash is in love with Sweety, the daughter of Sanyasi Naidu, Noor decides to leave him and marry an old sheikh in order to solve her family's financial problems on the pressure of their creditor and the local don Yadav. But Prakash does not know that Sweety is Sanyasi Naidu's daughter and Sweety is not aware of Prakash's intentions and takes his advances lightly. When Prakash learns of Noor's marriage, he beats the sheikh, Yadav, and his men in disguise and takes away Noor along with his friends. The two plots converge here as Prakash escapes in the Innova along with Noor and his friends, while the ACP is left severely injured. Neither Prakash nor his companions are aware of the money in the car.

To save Noor, Prakash arranges her stay in Sweety's house, to which she accepts. In the meantime, Sanyasi Naidu calls his henchmen to Hyderabad to kill the ACP and find the money. Another gang of Sanyasi Naidu is approached by Saradhi, who tells them to find the ₹50 crores and distribute it among themselves, and this stint makes the other gang turning into Saradhi's henchmen. The ACP makes a deal with encounter specialist Daniel to find the money and share it between them equally. Prakash realizes that his phone is missing and is in the Innova and goes to the parking lot along with Tabar in the latter's cab. There Prakash finds the money in the deck lid and shifts the bags into the deck lid of the cab. Tabar and Prakash go to the place where abandoned vehicles are kept, and there they see the money. The keys are with Prakash, and both go away from there. Meanwhile, Daniel and his subordinate go to the parking lot and find only a part of the money in the Innova's deck lid. While they are informing about it to the ACP, Sanyasi Naidu's henchmen kill him and see the photo of Daniel in the caller image when he dials again.

Daniel arrests all the Old City youngsters along with Prakash and Tabar, and Daniel's subordinate asks all of them about the money. Meanwhile, the local MLA intervenes, and all of them are released. Just as Prakash and Tabar leave the station, Saradhi's henchmen attack Prakash about the money, and Prakash manages to beat them and escapes with Tabar. After an inquiry with the local Qazi, Daniel learns about Yadav's presence in the only marriage that happened on the day of the missing Innova. Yadav's men steal the cab from the new area. While Prakash and Tabar blame each other of stealing the money, Yadav makes a call to Prakash and threatens to sell the cab if he does not bring Noor, but Yadav is unaware of the money in the cab. When Prakash, Tabar and Gokul see Yadav's men with the cab, they try to attack them, but Daniel arrests Yadav's men and Sanyasi Naidu's henchmen rob the car. While Prakash, Tabar and Gokul chase them on a bike, they hit the car of Daniel, and since Daniel knows that Prakash is also involved in the robbery of the Innova after beating Yadav's men at the spot, Prakash and Tabar are arrested. They are tortured, and when Daniel tries to shoot Prakash, Tabar tells that the money is in his cab. Tabar is shot by Daniel, and Sanyasi Naidu's men kill Daniel and his subordinate and kidnap Prakash. Gokul reaches the spot and takes Tabar along with him, whom Prakash believes to be dead.

Sanyasi Naidu sees Prakash and threatens to kill Noor (who is present in his house) if he does not tell the place where the money is. Sanyasi Naidu's henchmen inform him that the cab is at the place where they robbed it as there was no petrol in it to drive. Prakash goes there along with Sanyasi Naidu's henchmen and is informed by Sweety that he is going to be murdered after they reach the spot. Prakash beats them up and refuels the cab. He goes to Yadav's place, where Tabar and Gokul are being held. He calls Sanyasi Naidu to come there along with Noor if he wants him. Meanwhile, Prakash leaves petrol cans open inside the cab and plans to explode the cab once the petrol leaks. The two parties meet each other, and while everything is going smoothly, Saradhi's henchmen arrive along with Sweety and threaten Sanyasi Naidu to kill her if Prakash and the ₹50 crores are not handed to them. Prakash and Sanyasi Naidu are not at all happy as Yadav is now aware of the money's presence, and Prakash displays the money in the deck lid. He locks it and throws away the key. In the chaos that ensues, Sweety's life is endangered, which worries Sanyasi Naidu.

Once Sweety and Noor are saved, the petrol starts leaking profusely, and Prakash throws a burning stick on it, which blasts the car and the entire money is burnt into ashes. Sanyasi Naidu is a reformed man. Prakash marries Noor and goes to Dubai along with his friends. There, when Prakash's friends blame him for burning the money, Prakash replies that before reaching Yadav's place, he took ₹50 lakhs from the lot and replaced it with white papers. Out of the ₹49.5 crores, he donates ₹45 crores to Saheli, an organization established for the welfare of poor women in Old City to ensure that there is no financial problem to the Old City families, among which Noor's family is also one. The rest ₹4.5 cores are retained by Prakash with which he starts a very successful Sherwani business in Dubai with his wife and friends as employees.

== Cast ==
- Nani as Prakash
- Catherine as Noor
- Sidhika as Sweety (voice dubbed by Anasuya Bharadwaj)
- Bharath Reddy as Saradhi
- Charan Raj as Sanyasi Raju
- Raja Ravindra as Daniel
- Duvvasi Mohan as Daniel's subordinate
- Akbar Bin Tabar as Tabar, Prakash's friend
- Dheer Charan Shrivastav as Prakash's friend
- R.K. as Yadav

== Production ==
=== Development ===
After Krishna Vamsi's failure Mogudu, he began working on his next film. The film was officially launched on 29 June 2011 at Hyderabad in the production office in the morning. Krishna Vamsi declared that a New Music Director would work for this film and Prasad Murella would handle the camera. In the end of April 2012, while shooting was continuing, the film's title was declared as Paisa. In January 2013, a press note was issued stating that Nani would sport a Swarovski Crystal Suit which costed ₹0.45 million. It was said to be an inspiration of the outfits used by Michael Jackson.

=== Casting ===
Nani was recruited to play the role of Prakash, a Sherwani Model in Old City who is obsessed to gain Money which even makes him pronounce his name as Pra'cash'. Catherine Tresa was recruited to play the role of Noor, a Muslim girl. This film was supposed to be her Debut in Telugu cinema, but her other projects Chammak Challo and Iddarammayilatho released before this film. Charan Raj was selected to play the main antagonist of the film. In this film, he played the role of a corrupt politician. Hyderabadi Cinema Comedian Akbar Bin Tabar, who is well known for his unique dialogue delivery, was selected to play the role of a Taxi Driver in this film.

=== Marketing ===
The first look posters and teaser were released on 24 February 2013 on the occasion of Nani's Birthday. The logo of the film was officially launched on the same day at Hyderabad on the eve of Nani's Birthday. On 27 March 2013 two posters were released by the production team on the eve of Holi festival which carried the team's wishes to the people. On 18 May 2013 the Audio release poster featuring Catherine Tresa was released along with few other posters on the Internet. The film's Trailer was released on 19 May 2013 along with the soundtrack Album.

== Soundtrack ==
Paisa

Soundtrack album by Sai Karthik
- Released: 19 May 2013
- Recorded: 2013
- Genre: Soundtrack
- Length: 22:24
- Label: Aditya Music
- Producer: Sai Karthik

Sai Karthik chronology
Jinke Mari (2013)	Paisa (2013)	Rowdy (2014)

The soundtrack of the film was composed by Sai Karthik. The album was launched through Aditya Music label on 19 May 2013 in a promotional event held at Shilpakala Vedika in Hyderabad. Nani and Allari Naresh anchored the event. The film's crew and many well known celebrities attended the event. Veteran director Dasari Narayana Rao launched the trailer in the same event.

The soundtrack album received positive response. 123telugu.com gave a review stating "Paisa has some pretty decent music. The film’s theme song, ‘Paisa Theme’, is highly entertaining and music director Sai Karthik has done a very good job with this number. Among the other tracks, ‘Govindaa Govindaa’ ‘Neetho Edho’ and ‘Mayya Mayya’ are good. Sai Karthik has played a safe game, by coming up with pleasant but slightly routine music. Krishna Vamsi is known for coming up with very good visuals for his songs, so let us see what magic he can do this time." IndiaGlitz gave a review stating "It is time for yet another Krishna Vamsi audio – something where each song is driven by the needs of the script rather than any other extraneous consideration. Sirivennela Seetharama Sastry, the director's favourite, doesn't disappoint. When the theme is paisa, his talent comes to the fore like best. The singers, right from Tippu and Vijay Prakash to Shweta Mohan and others give their best. Sai Karthik gives one of his career bests." Apherald.com gave a review stating "All together Paisa audio is impressive and songs will get more popular once film comes before audiences."

Track listing
No.	Title	Lyrics	Singer(s)	Length
1.	"Eppudaithe Puttindo"	Sirivennela Seetharama Sastry	Krishna Vamsi, Vitthal, Venu, Dhanraj, Thagubothu Ramesh, Chandra	3:34
2.	"Govindaa Govindaa"	Ananta Sriram	Tippu, Baby Thillu	3:28
3.	"Mayya Mayya"	Sirivennela Seetharama Sastry	Vijay Prakash	4:18
4.	"Neetho Edo"	Sirivennela Seetharama Sastry	Shweta Mohan, Sai Karthik	4:25
5.	"Paisa Paisa"	Sirivennela Seetharama Sastry	Ranjith, Rahul Nambiar, Karthik Kumar	4:14
6.	"Paisa Theme" (Instrumental)			2:25
Total length:				22:24

== Reception ==
The Hindu gave a review stating "A cocktail of crime, comedy and politics requires a solid plot, believable characters and racy storytelling. With Paisa, Krishna Vamsi tries to deliver a dizzying fun outing but tries to make do without a strong plot. Paisa has many things going for it by way of standing out from routine potboilers. There are witty lines, many well-conceived and well-executed scenes but on the whole, this isn’t Krishna Vamsi’s best." Deccan Chronicle gave a review stating "Krishna Vamsi, unlike his earlier films, does not give attention to the emotional details making the storyline appear routine. His direction is lacking in many aspects making this one not one of his bests. The predictability of the plot is further marred by logical loopholes. The film might disappoint, but you can watch it for Nani" and rated the film 2.5/5. Desimartini.com gave a review stating "Not as talked about as RGV’s but Krishna Vamsi's descent into the restless madness is an equally interesting story. A super exciting auteur until a point for whatever reasons had turned into this insecure and loudly eager man that would try anything to distract the audience than letting the film have a shot longer than 12 frames. For the head to handle about 893 cuts in less than a minute and of something that wasn’t shot for such a pacey cut, the audience should be real brain dead to not feel irritated" and rated the film 2/5.

Oneindia Entertainment gave a review stating "Krishna Vamsi, who wants to deal with Hawala and money laundering issues in a different way, has chosen wonderful story for Paisa, but he has failed to execute his ideas on screen. Overall, Paisa is a good commercial entertainer, but it is not up to the mark of Krishna Vamsi's previous ventures. Nani's performance is the saving grace in the film. You can watch the film, If you are a hardcore fan of Nani or Krishna" and rated the film 3/5. 123telugu.com gave a review stating "Paisa is a movie that will not give you a paisa vasool experience at the Box Office. Despite some good efforts from Nani, this movie will face huge challenges at the Box Office. Poor technical values, lack of an engaging screenplay and low entertainment value will hurt the film" and rated the film 2.5/5. IndiaGlitz gave a review stating "The script is full of lacunae. Nani's character is inappropriately happy-go-lucky. Moreover, his expression should have been intense in the second part of the film but that is not so. The screenplay was terribly written and executed, as the result, the audience feel that, barring Raja Ravindar, the others were less than perturbed by the mess. It is a Run-of-the-mill film from a director who has seemingly run out of ideas" and rated the film 2.25/5.

greatandhra.com gave a review stating "The opening few minutes of the film doesn’t waste any time and gets the audience into the story. It is not until the interval caption that one realizes that first half is over. But trouble begins in second half. It could not sustain the same speed and had a dip which eventually played the spoilsport. Krishna Vamsi has tapped the element of human greed for money so while it appeals to the masses it doesn’t have enough for other genre of audience to like it" and rated the film 2/5. gulte.com gave a review stating "Apart from Nani's performance there is nothing much to talk about Paisa. Krishna Vamsi failed execution let the film down. There are few impressive moments in the film, but those are not enough to hold the film together. Krishna Vamsi's eccentric style of filmmaking will not impress many. Even his diehard fans will be disappointed to see him making a mess out of this interesting plot" and rated the film 2.75/5. Apherald.com gave a review stating "These are hard times for Telugu Cinegoers as good movies are hard to find. The poor viewer is not demanding trailblazing or superb art at the movies. All they want is paisa vasool entertainers. Krishna Vamsi's Paisa could have been a great entertainer, unfortunately it isn't!" and rated the film 2/5.
