= Shankar IPS =

- Directed by: M. S. Ramesh
- Written by: M. S. Ramesh
- Produced by: K. Manju
- Starring: Duniya Vijay; Catherine Tresa; Ragini Dwivedi; Avinash
- Cinematography: Dasari Srinivasa Rao
- Edited by: S. Manohar
- Music by: Gurukiran
- Production company: Bindushree Films
- Release date: 21 May 2010
- Running time: 145 minutes
- Country: India
- Language: Kannada

Shankar IPS is a 2010 Indian Kannada language action - crime film written and directed by M. S. Ramesh and produced by K. Manju. The film stars Duniya Vijay along with Catherine Tresa, a model making her debut, and Ragini Dwivedi in the lead roles. The film deals with the social issues such as acid attacks on women, the plight of women call centers employees and others. The film was also dubbed in Hindi with the same title name.

The film released on 21 May 2010, rated U/A across Karnataka and set high expectations for its storyline and toned body of the lead actor. However, upon release, the film generally met with negative reviews from the critics and audience.

== Plot ==
Shankar Prasad (Vijay) is a tough police officer on a mission to eradicate all the social evils around him. His unique style is to kill his enemies out rightly in encounters which irks most of the corrupt politicians and cops. He gets dismissed and transferred several times but does not get deterred in the completion of his mission. Shilpa (Catherine) is a wannabe beauty contestant winner who dreams of winning the Miss India title. She comes across with the top business tycoon Saklej's son, who assaults her and even makes an acid attack on her. Shankar is on a mission to hunt this criminal even as he develops a love feeling towards her.

== Cast ==
- Duniya Vijay as Shankar Prasad, IPS
- Catherine Tresa as Shilpa
- Ragini Dwivedi as Ashwini
- Avinash as Saklej
- Rangayana Raghu
- Vinaya Prasad
- Chi. Guru Dutt
- Sunil
- Shobaraj
- Kashi

== Production ==
Director M. S. Ramesh teamed up with popular producer K. Manju for his second directorial venture and named it Shankar IPS. He was on the hunt for a well built actor who would require to do some heavy action sequences for the film and play a cop. For this role, he opted Duniya Vijay again after his first film Thaakath. Vijay was required to build a six-pack abs for his role of a tough cop, and the director teamed up with ace body builder Kitty to train to build up Vijay's physiques. Bangalore based model, Catherine Tresa was roped in to play the female lead. Another actress Ragini Dwivedi was cast to play the second lead role.

The filming took place for 65 days at a stretch and was shot primarily in locales of Mysore. Some song sequences were shot at Bangkok.

== Soundtrack ==
Shankar IPS

Soundtrack album by Gurukiran
- Released: 11 May 2010
- Genre: Film soundtrack
- Label: Anand Audio

All the songs are composed by Gurukiran teaming up with the director M. S. Ramesh yet again. The audio launch was much amidst the fanfare held at Mysore with actor Prem Kumar being the special invitee. The event was held at a hotel on 11 May 2010.

All music is composed by Gurukiran.

Track listing
No.	Title	Lyrics	Singer(s)	Length
1.	"Sale Sale"	Kaviraj	Raghu Dixit, Sonu Kakkar
2.	"Win Agona"	Santhosh Naik	Chaitra H. G.
3.	"Chandra"	Kaviraj	Apoorva Sridhar
4.	"Shankar IPS"	Gurukiran	Gurukiran
5.	"Chumbaka"	Kaviraj	Vijay Prakash, K. S. Chithra

== Reception ==
=== Critical response ===
A critic from The Times of India scored the film at 2.5 out of 5 stars and says "Hats off to Vijay for his brilliance in action sequences. Rangayana Raghu, Avinash excel. Ragini Dwivedi and Catherine are okay. While Gurukiran's music is average, Dasari Srinivasarao has done a good job as cinematographer". Shruti Indira Lakshminarayana from Rediff.com scored the film at 1.5 out of 5 stars and wrote "The climax gets a little preachy and the length could have definitely been shorter. But if you are a Vijay fan, then you won't mind this one bit". A critic from The New Indian Express wrote "As far as Vijay’s performance is concerned, he is at his best in the action scenes. He has also improved a lot in dialogue delivery. But had he made a little bit effort to pronounce the dialogues clearly, it would be better. The police station scene where Vijay is seen in tears looks incongruous". B S Srivani from Deccan Herald wrote "Apart from stilted dialogue delivery, the Black Cobra’s preparations are underutilised. Ravi Varma’s action is good. Playing an able adversary is Rangayana Raghu, whose recent choice of roles has changed for the better. Newcomer model Catherine Treasa is good. Ragini is a fast learner and a looker in a sari as well! Gurukiran fails to impress. Though a tad lengthy, “Shankar IPS” doesn't disappoint". A critic from Bangalore Mirror wrote "The film is a reminder of films with Saikumar as a cop. It is fun to imagine him delivering these kind of dialogues in his exaggerated style. Vijay is partly convincing in this role. Newcomer Catherine shows potential and sings of growing as an actress. A tedious film to watch".
