= Arakshaka =

- Arakshaka Poster
- Directed by: P. Vasu
- Written by: V. R. Bhaskar; Upendra (Dialogues)
- Screenplay by: P. Vasu
- Story by: P. Vasu
- Produced by: Krishna Prajwal
- Starring: Upendra; Ragini Dwivedi; Sadha
- Cinematography: P. K. H. Das
- Edited by: Suresh Urs
- Music by: Gurukiran
- Production company: Udayaravi Films
- Distributed by: Udaya Ravi Films
- Release date: 26 January 2012
- Running time: 2 hours 40 minutes
- Country: India
- Language: Kannada
- Budget: ₹4 Crore
- Box office: ₹0.80 Crore

Arakshaka is a 2012 Indian Kannada-language psychological thriller mystery film starring Upendra, Sadha and Ragini Dwivedi in the lead roles. The film is directed by P. Vasu. Krishna Prajwal has produced the film under Udaya Ravi Films. Gurukiran is the music director of the film. Karnataka's former CM and State Janata Dal President, H. D. Kumaraswamy released the audio of the film. The film is loosely inspired by the 2010 Hollywood film Shutter Island.

Upendra has played a psychological role after a brief gap. He had last played such type of roles in his earlier psychological films like A (1998), Upendra (1999) which were directed by himself, and Preethse (2000).

The film was released on 26 January 2012 and opened to positive reviews.

== Plot ==
Arun Kumar, an IPS officer who enters a heavily guarded mental asylum to investigate the mysterious disappearance of a patient named Stephen Raj. Convinced that the facility’s dean and staff are harboring Stephen, Arun teams up with a resident psychiatrist, Dr. Nandini (Maya), to uncover institutional secrets while simultaneously searching for his missing wife, Catherine. As his investigation deepens and he encounters a patient who looks exactly like him, a complex web of memories and delusions unravels. The dark climax reveals that Arun suffers from psychogenic amnesia; fueled by deep-rooted paranoia inherited from his mother, he had falsely suspected Catherine of having an affair with Stephen (who was actually her brother) and murdered them both. Ultimately, Arun is not an investigator but a patient himself, and the elaborate setup was a psychological exercise orchestrated by his twin brother, Dr. Vishnu, to help him confront the truth and clear his trauma

== Cast ==
- Upendra as Arun Kumar and Vishnu Kumar, twin brothers
- Ragini Dwivedi as Dr. Nandini
- Sadha as Catherine
- Seetha
- Shayaji Shinde
- Sharan
- Arasu Maharaj
- Mysore Ramanand
- Joe Simon
- Venkata Rao
- Cool Chinna
- Rajesh Nataranga
- Jyothi Muroor
- Adi Lokesh
- R. G. Vijayasarathy

== Soundtrack ==
Aarakshaka

Soundtrack album by Gurukiran
- Released: December 2011
- Genre: Feature film soundtrack
- Label: Ashwini Media Networks

Gurukiran has composed 5 songs set to the lyrics of Kaviraj, Upendra and Hamsalekha

No.	Title	Lyrics	Singer(s)	Length
1.	"I'm a Barbie Girl"	Kaviraj	Chaitra H. G.
2.	"Kalli Kalli"	Upendra	Srinivas, Shruti Tumkur
3.	"Kuch Kuch"	Kaviraj	K. S. Chithra, Vijay Yesudas
4.	"Rathri Yella"	Hamsalekha	Gurukiran, Akansha Badami
5.	"Thu Nan Makla"	Upendra	Kailash Kher

== Reception ==
=== Critical response ===
A critic from The Times of India scored the film at 3 out of 5 stars and says "While Upendra is super as a police officer, it's Ragini who steals the show with her brilliant emoting and body language. Sharana's comedy track is silly. Music by Gurukiran is okay. Cinematography by P K H Das is the highlight of the movie". A critic from The New Indian Express wrote "Gurukiran has done a neat job. The songs are melodious. VERDICT: Watch the movie, if you are ready to watch it twice. Else, it will be difficult for you to follow the plot line". Srikanth Srinivasa from Rediff.com scored the film at 3 out of 5 stars and says "Gurukiran's music is nothing to write about. But the songs are choreographed well with Upendra doing some unusual dance steps. There is a song in praise of Anna Hazare. P K H Dass has captured the locales of Kannur in all its glory. The film has been shot in Thailand as well". Shruti Gautham from DNA wrote "Vasu this time even seems to have run out of the luck that the letter ‘Aa’ had brought him in the case of Aapthamitra and Aaptharakshaka. Aarakshaka is not a film that is beyond your imagination more so if you have watched Shutter Island! ". A critic from Bangalore Mirror wrote "Upendra gets a flattering makeover, resembling the composer. P Vasu, who has been busy with various versions of Manichitrathazhu in the last few years, has not come out of that hangover yet. By choosing a somewhat similar 'mental disease' to cure, he has only fed the audience too much of a problem". B S Srivani from Deccan Herald wrote "The climax drags a bit but panders to the hero’s image. According to Upendra, even the intelligent will require repeated viewing to understand the entire film. But then, the viewer is not a fool either".
