= Saloni Aswani =

Indian actress and model

- Born: Ulhasnagar, Maharashtra, India
- Occupations: Actress, Model
- Years active: 2003–present

Saloni Aswani is an Indian actress and model who appears in Telugu and Kannada films. After finishing her education, Saloni ventured into modelling, appearing in various television advertisements. She went on to pursue a career in acting, debuting in the Hindi film Dil Pardesi Ho Gayaa (2003), following which she starred in several Telugu films, failing to achieve notable commercial success. She gained notice through her performances in Buddhivantha (2008) and S. S. Rajamouli's Maryada Ramanna (2010), leading to roles in further major Telugu productions.

== Early life ==
Aswani was born in Ulhasnagar, Maharashtra into a Sindhi Hindu family as Vandana. Her father was an assistant commissioner of narcotics. The family moved to CGS quarters at Wadala, Mumbai, when she was around five years old. After completing school, she enrolled at the Shreemati Nathibai Damodar Thackersey Women's University (SNDT) near New Marine Lines/Churchgate, Mumbai, and graduated in Psychology.

She was always interested in acting and was supported by her mother, while her father wanted her to "do a respectable job". Without her father's knowledge, she created a portfolio and sent it to modelling agencies. She appeared in several television advertisements like Vaseline, Lifebuoy, Parachute Oil, Moove, Chic Shampoo, Three Roses tea and Meera soaps. Throughout her academic career, she had always participated in dramas, especially mimicking Sridevi. She also participated with a theatre group Kala Sansad and took acting lessons in Ashok Kumar's Academy of Dramatic Arts, run by his daughter, Preeti Ganguly.

== Career ==
She made her acting debut in the 2003 Hindi film Dil Pardesi Ho Gaya, directed by Sawaan Kumar Tak, who rechristened her as Saloni. She then got to appear in her first Telugu film Dhana 51 (2005) and followed it up with Oka Oorillo, both of them ending up as commercial failures. In 2006 she starred in 5 films, performing lead roles in Chukkallo Chandrudu and Kokila in Telugu and Rehguzar and Saawan... The Love Season in Hindi, the latter featuring her as Salman Khan's romantic interest, while doing a special appearance in the song "Nachindey Chesey" for the film Boss, I Love You. She debuted in the Tamil film industry with a starring role in Madurai Veeran (2007), and in the Kannada cinema the following year, playing one of the five lead actresses in Buddhivanta, both being her only releases in 2007 and 2008, respectively; the latter went on to become a blockbuster.

Her first release in 2009 was the Kannada film Dubai Babu, in which she played a minor supporting role, with her performance being appreciated by critics. Later that year, she appeared in a cameo role in the high-budget fantasy adventure Magadheera by S. S. Rajamouli, which garnered attention and prompted Rajamouli to cast her as the lead female character in his subsequent project Maryada Ramanna, with Sunil as the protagonist. Described as a "musical comedy", the film received positive reviews, while also emerging commercially successful. Saloni garnered positive feedback as well, with Jeevi from Idlebrain noting that she was "refreshing" and looked "pretty good". Her other 2010 release was Mr. Theertha in Kannada language, with Saloni citing that she was upset with the attitude of the makers, resulting in her declining further Kannada projects. She has finished shooting for the film Telugu Ammayi, which she terms as a "female-oriented film", revolving around her character, Balatripura Sundari, a "typical traditional innocent Telugu girl" who "turns ferocious to save her struggling family". For the film, she had to ride a horse in one particular scene and speak the Godavari slang throughout. In late 2011, she made a special appearance in the Tamil film Rajapattai, starring Vikram.

In 2012, Saloni played a lead female role in Bodyguard alongside Venkatesh and Trisha Krishnan. She next appeared in Adhinayakudu opposite Balakrishna and two Kannada films Lakshmi and Benki Birugali. Saloni Aswani's upcoming films include the Kannada films Jaggi directed by Sultan Raja and Shivam directed by Srinivasa Raju and the Telugu film Race Gurram.

== Filmography ==
Key
†	Denotes films that have not yet been released

Year	Title	Role	Language	Notes	Ref.
2003	Dil Pardesi Ho Gayaa	Rukhsaa Khan	Hindi		
2005	Dhana 51	Lakshmi	Telugu		
2005	Oka Oorilo	Lalita	Telugu		
2006	Chukkallo Chandrudu	Shalini	Telugu		
2006	Kokila	Kokila	Telugu		
2006	Saawan... The Love Season	Kajal Kapoor	Hindi		
2006	Boss	Herself	Telugu	Special appearance in item song	
2007	Madurai Veeran	Priya Mayandi	Tamil		
2008	Buddhivanta	Shanthi	Kannada		
2009	Dubai Babu		Kannada		
2009	Magadheera	Apilli	Telugu	Cameo appearance	
2010	Mr. Theertha	Nayana	Kannada		
2010	Maryada Ramanna	Aparna	Telugu		
2011	Telugu Ammayi	Balatripura Sundari	Telugu		
2011	Rajapattai	Herself	Tamil	Special appearance in song "Villadhi Villain"	
2012	Bodyguard	Swathi	Telugu	SIIMA Award for Best Supporting Actress – Telugu; Nominated – Filmfare Award for Best Supporting Actress – Telugu	
2012	Adhinayakudu	Shravani	Telugu		
2013	Lakshmi	Lakshmi's junior officer	Kannada		
2013	Benki Birugali		Kannada		
2014	Race Gurram	Swetha	Telugu		
2015	Shivam	Bhavani	Kannada		
2015	Cine Mahal	Herself	Telugu	Special appearance in song "Padhihenu Eta Nenu"	
2016	Meelo Evaru Koteeswarudu	Samantha	Telugu		
2024	Tantra	Rajeshwari	Telugu		
2024	Matka	Padma	Telugu		
2026	Hardu		Telugu		
