= Veera Madakari (film) =

- DVD cover
- Directed by: Sudeep
- Written by: Dialogues: Ravi Raj; Anil Kumar
- Screenplay by: Sudeep
- Story by: V. Vijayendra Prasad
- Based on: Vikramarkudu by S. S. Rajamouli
- Produced by: Dinesh Gandhi
- Starring: Sudeep
- Cinematography: Sri Venkat
- Edited by: B.S. Kemparaju
- Music by: M. M. Keeravani
- Production company: S. S. Combines
- Release date: 20 March 2009
- Running time: 175 minutes
- Country: India
- Language: Kannada

Veera Madakari (Note: Also known as Ee Shathamaanada Veera Madakari.) is a 2009 Indian Kannada-language action film directed by Sudeep. The film features Sudeep in a double role alongside debutant Ragini Dwivedi in the lead roles. The film features a background score and soundtrack composed by M. M. Keeravani and produced by Dinesh Gandhi. This film is the remake of S. S. Rajamouli's Telugu film Vikramarkudu (2006). The film was released on 20 March 2009 and was a blockbuster at the box office.

== Plot ==
The story revolves around Muttati Sathyaraju (Sudeep), a small-time conman, in Bangalore who is cunning and adept at doing daring deeds. One day, he meets Neeraja Goswamy (Ragini Dwivedi) who was come from Madhya Pradesh to attend a wedding in Karnataka. They instantly fall in love.

He tells the truth to her that he is a petty thief and decides to give up theft forever. But before that, he decides to cheat the last person along with his aide Hosdoddi (Tennis Krishna) for a huge amount. He tricks a woman at a bus stand and runs away with the trunk. This leads him to Neha, a girl who thinks Sathyaraju is her father instead of the wealth kept in the trunk. He wondered that what was going on, but he were forced to keep Neha with them because of Inspector Shinde were watching over him.

Although he tries to keep Neha away from Neeraja's eyes she finds out. An angry and pained Neeraja goes to her place and Sathyaraju is heartbroken. Soon, he were attacked by an unknown goons and he was appointed as Superintendent of Police, ACP Veera Madakari IPS (Sudeep), Neha's real father. Madakari looks like Sathyaraju, the cause of all the confusion. As many unknowns help Sathyaraju run to safety with Neha in his arms, he is soon surrounded by goons. That's when Madakari appears and kills all the goons by himself and saves the day, but he soon dies of his injuries.

Other policemen who assisted the ACP conveyed the full details of the incident to Sathyaraju. In Chambal village of Devgarh, Madhya Pradesh, a slain, corrupt local MLA Babjee (Gopinath Bhat), a borderline psychopath, engulfs the city with his political corruption, illegal activities, criminal connections, rape and money laundering. His son Munna (Arun Sagar) indulges in abusing women and raping policemen's wives. Later at the party organized by Babjee (even the Home Minister comes to the party), a cop is being humiliated by stripping him of his clothes, but Madakari cleverly kills him while hanging from a tree by the belt of the humiliated inspector. After a few days, In a Holi celebration Madakari was attacked by Babjee's brother Titla (Suryanarayana Waali), where he was stabbed in the back and shot in the head while trying to save a village boy. But he survives with brain damage but the goons thinks that he is dead. The effects of his brain injury would appear later, and these effects would be lessened by having water fall on his head.

After knowing the past events, Sathyaraju adopts Neha who is unaware that her real father is dead. Sathyaraju then returns to Devgarh disguised as Veera Madakari and moves to reconcile with Babjee. Neeraja knows all the truth from Hosdoddi. Then she comes and meets Sathyaraju, but he avoids her because he is Veera Madakari now. So she exposes her hip to seduce him, he tries to control himself and finally he falls for her. Then Neeraja forgives him and Sathyaraju being a goon manages Babjee well with tricks. He sets MLA's wine factory on fire and the villagers loot his eatery. In the ensuing fight, he single-handedly defeats all of Babjee's men. At the end, he fights Titla on a rope bridge. Sathyaraju ties and cuts the rope and Titla falls to his death. Sathyaraju marries Neeraja and they start a begins a new life with Neha and Hosdoddi.

== Cast ==
- Sudeep in dual role as Muttati Sathyaraju and Veera Madakari IPS
- Ragini Dwivedi as Neeraja Goswamy
- Devaraj as Commissioner (Cameo)
- Mamta Mohandas as Madakari's wife (portrait only)
- Simran Khan in Special appearance in song "Manjari Manjari"
- Jerusha Christopher as Veera Madakari's daughter
- Tennis Krishna as Hosdoddi
- Arun Sagar as Munna
- Doddanna as Home Minister
- Gopinath Bhat as Babjee
- Dharma as Circle Inspector Shinde
- Vanishri as Shinde's wife
- Suryanarayana Waali as Titla (voice over by Sudeep)
- Shailaja Joshi
- Thimme Gowda
- Manmohan Rai
- K. V. Manjayya
- Jayashree Rao
- Dinesh Gandhi
- Arasu Maharaj
- Tumkur Mohan

== Production ==
The film marks Sudeep's third directional venture after My Autograph (2006) and No 73, Shanthi Nivasa (2007). In the film, Sudeep casts himself in two different roles and has also given his voice to some songs.

== Soundtrack ==
Veera Madakari

Soundtrack album by M. M. Keeravani
- Released: January 6, 2009
- Genre: Feature film soundtrack
- Length: 21:33
- Language: Kannada
- Label: Anand Audio
- Producer: M.M. Keeravani

M. M. Keeravani chronology
Gunde Jhallumandi (2008)	Veera Madakari (2009)	Magadheera (2009)

The film has 6 songs composed by M. M. Keeravani, who reused his songs from the original.

No.	Title	Lyrics	Singer(s)	Length
1.	"Jinta Ta"	Kaviraj	Sudeep, Tennis Krishna, Anuradha Bhat, Drum Prakash
2.	"Dummare Dumma"	Shridhar	Shankar Mahadevan, Akanksha Badami, Sunita
3.	"Jum Jum Maaya"	Kaviraj	Ajay Warrior, Anuradha Bhat
4.	"Manjari Manjari"	V. Nagendra Prasad	Sinchana Dixit
5.	"Jo Laali"	K C Kiran	Akanksha Badami
6.	"Veera Madakari"	Satish Aryan	Satish Aryan and chorus

== Reception ==
=== Critical response ===
R G Vijayasarathy of Rediff.com scored the film at 2.5 out of 5 stars and wrote "Besides Sudeep, the film's major attraction is child actor Joysha Christopher whose performance is superb. Newcomer Raagini is impressive while Gopinath and Soori are too loud. Tennis Krishna fits the bill. Dharma, Dinesh Gandhi and the Lady Inspector have all done a good job. Songs and camera work are good. Go for Veera Madakari only if you haven't seen the original". A critic from The New Indian Express wrote "Finally, Satyaraju goes to Chambal area in the guise of Madhakari and bashes the living daylights out of Babloo and his gang. The only disadvantage of this film is the length, d i rect o r Sudeep could trim it a little bit. But overall, a good entertainer for Sudeep’s fans". A critic from Bangalore Mirror wrote "The tunes are the same as in Vikramarkudu and Rajesh Ramnath has done what he is best at; retaining original tunes for remake films. The only person for whom this film could have a positive impact is debutante Ragini. If you are not a hardcore fan of Sudeep, ready for anything, you are sure to come out of Veera Madakari with a headache". A critic from The Times of India scored the film at 3 out of 5 stars and says "When Madakari is killed by the goons, Sathyaraj who resembles Madakari, assumes his identity and eliminates the goons and restores peace to Devagarh. How does he do it? Sudeep excels in both roles. Tennis Krishna is impressive. Dharma proves he is good at sentimental roles too. Music director Keeravani fails to live up to his reputation".

== Box office ==
Veera Madakari completed 100 days. This film was a major comeback for actor Sudeep from the streak of failures. This was the second highest-grossing Kannada movie of 2009.

== Awards ==
2nd Suvarna Film Awards :-

- Favorite Hero - Winner - Sudeep
- Best Debut Actress - Winner - Ragini Dwivedi
- Best Choreographer - Nominated - Pradeep Antony
- Star Pair of the Year - Nominated - Sudeep & Ragini Dwivedi

Zee Kannada Innovative Film Awards :-

- Special Jury Award - Winner - Sudeep
- Best Child Actor - Winner - Baby Jorusha

South Scope Cine Awards :-

- Best Comedian Kannada - Nominated - Tennis Krishna
