= Shiva (2012 film) =

- Poster
- Directed by: Om Prakash Rao
- Dialogues by: M. S. Ramesh
- Screenplay by: Omprakash rao
- Story by: Omprakash Rao
- Produced by: K. P. Srikanth; R. Srinivas; Kantharaju
- Starring: Shiva Rajkumar; Ragini Dwivedi
- Cinematography: Satya Hegde
- Edited by: Deepu. S. Kumar
- Music by: Gurukiran
- Production company: Company Films
- Distributed by: Ramu Enterprises
- Release date: 24 August 2012
- Running time: 160 minutes
- Country: India
- Language: Kannada

Shiva is a 2012 Kannada-language action film directed by Om Prakash Rao and produced by Company films. The film stars Shiva Rajkumar in his 101st film, alongside Ragini Dwivedi, Rangayana Raghu, P. Ravi Shankar, and Chi. Guru Dutt.

== Plot ==
Rajendra, a jockey in Turf Club, is accused of cheating as his horse was drugged during the race. Rajendra and his best friend David D'Souza, a news reporter, learn that Panduranga Shetty, Mastaan and Aadikeshava, who are corporate businessmen and good friends, are responsible for the incident as Rajendra refuses to lose the race for their selfishness. Before submitting the evidence, Shetty, Aadikeshava and Mastaan barge at David's house and kill him and his wife. They are buried in a coffin with David's daughter Julie as the lone survivor.

Fifteen years later, Aadikeshava and Shetty become rivals due to a misunderstanding. Julie, being trained with sharpshooting and other tactics, kills Aadikeshava's son Ajay and Aadikeshava believes that Shetty has killed Ajay. Aadikeshava orders his henchmen to trace Shetty's son and kill him. Shiva, Shetty's son and a carefree youngster, falls for Julie, who is working in Airtel. Julie accepts Shiva's love after various events. At the cemetery, Aadikeshava's men attack Shiva, who defeats them. However, Shiva is brutally stabbed by Julie. One of Aadikeshava's henchman learn about Julie's involvement in Ajay's death and rivalry between Shetty and Aadikeshava and informs it to Aadikeshava, who reunites with Shetty and decide to track down Julie.

It is revealed that Shiva is not Shetty's son, but an informer sent by Mastaan to gather evidence to finish Shetty and Aadikeshava's empire. Shiva tells Mastaan that Shetty's real son is in Goa, where he learns that Julie is also in Goa as Shetty's son's assistant. Shetty's son learns about Julie's agenda and chases after her, but is saved by Shiva and the duo escape. Julie apologize to Shiva as she assumed that he is Shetty's son and reveals her past. Shiva makes a paper toy and reveals himself as Rajendra's son and Julie's childhood friend. Shiva reveals that Rajendra was also killed by Aadikeshava, Shetty and Mastaan on the same day Julie's family died. Shiva was sent to prison on false charges, where he meets Mustaan, who was also imprisoned on false charges by Shetty and Aadikeshava. Shiva saves Mustaan and gains his trust in order to wipe down the trio.

Shiva and Julie sneak into Shetty's warehouse and gathers the evidence against Shetty for illegal activities. At the Turf Club, Shetty and Aadikeshava meets Mastaan, who reveals his intentions to kill them. Julie meets the trio and reveals Shiva's true identity and reveals that Shiva has taken Rajendra's place as the jockey. Shiva wins the race and reveals his father's innocence. The trio challenges Shiva to save Julie from getting killed. Shiva arrives at the venue and a final combat ensues, where Shiva and Julie kill the trio, thus avenging their families's death.

== Cast ==
- Shiva Rajkumar as Shiva
- Ragini Dwivedi as Julie D'Souza
- Rangayana Raghu as Panduranga Shetty
- P. Ravishankar as Aadhikeshava
- Chi. Guru Dutt as Mastaan
- Ravi Kale as Rajendra, Shiva's father
- Suchendra Prasad as David D'Souza, Julie's father
- Mandeep Roy as Shindhe
- Padmaja Rao as Julie's mother
- John Kokken as Shetty's son
- Karthik Jayaram as Ajay, Aadikeshava's son
- Saurav Lokesh as a police trainee
- Suchithra
- Mico Nagaraj
- Danny Kuttappa
- Ramesh Bhat
- Mallesh Gowda
- Stunt Siddu
- K. S. Ravindranath
- Karthik
- Patre Nagaraj
- Kishore
- Harish Rayappa
- Shobaraj
- Bullet Prakash
- Suman Ranganathan in the song "Appu Appu" (cameo appearance)

== Soundtrack ==
Shiva

Soundtrack album by Gurukiran
- Released: 10 June 2012
- Genre: Feature film soundtrack
- Label: Ananda Audio Video

No.	Title	Lyrics	Singer(s)	Length
1.	"Appu Appu"	Kaviraj	Mamta Sharma
2.	"Kollegaladalli"		Picchalli Srinivas, Malgudi Subha
3.	"Nee Odi Bandaaga"	Kaviraj	Baba Sehgal, Chaitra H. G.
4.	"Oosaravalli"	Kaviraj	Aishwarya Majumdar, Vijay Prakash
5.	"Shiva Shiva"		Gurukiran
6.	"Shiva Theme"		Instrumental

== Reception ==
=== Critical response ===
The Times of India gave 3.5/5 and wrote "It’s a Shivrajkumar show all the way. In his 101st movie, Shivanna looks young and energetic, essaying his role superbly — be it romantic, sentimental or action. Shiva is the best gift for his fans." Shruti I. L of DNA gave 1.5/5 stars and wrote "Shiva is a mismatched puzzle that only hardcore Shivarajkumar fans would want to put together." News18 wrote "A brilliant performer and action hero Shivraj Kumar never disappoints his fans." B. S Srivani of Deccan Herald wrote "Slick and fast-paced, Shiva entertains the masses with lip-smacking dialogues, though horse lovers have to suffer some disappointment, despite Satya Hegde’s roving camera capturing the race course pretty well."

== Accolades ==
Ceremony	Category	Nominee	Result
2nd South Indian International Movie Awards	Best Actor	Shivarajkumar	Won
2nd South Indian International Movie Awards	Best Actress (Critics)	Ragini Dwivedi	Won
2nd South Indian International Movie Awards	Best Comedian	Rangayana Raghu	Nominated
2nd South Indian International Movie Awards	Best Lyricist	Kaviraj for "Nee Odi Bandaga"	Nominated
2nd South Indian International Movie Awards	Best Male Playback Singer	Baba Sehgal for "Nee Odi Bandaga"	Nominated
