= Divorce Invitation =

- Theatrical released poster
- Directed by: S. V. Krishna Reddy
- Written by: S. V. Krishna Reddy; Bala Rajasekharuni; Robert Naturman
- Based on: Aahvaanam
- Produced by: M. S. P. Srinivas Reddy; R. R. Venkat
- Starring: Jonathan Bennett; Jamie-Lynn Sigler; Nadia Bjorlin; Maeve Quinlan; Elliott Gould; Lainie Kazan; Keith Robinson; Paul Sorvino; Richard Kind
- Cinematography: Brad Rushing
- Edited by: Blue Murray; Gary D. Roach
- Music by: Lenny "Step" Bunn; Ed Barguiarena
- Production companies: Shoreline Entertainment; Venkat Productions
- Distributed by: R. R. Movie Makers
- Release date: November 15, 2012
- Running time: 115 minutes
- Country: United States
- Language: English

Divorce Invitation is a 2012 American romantic comedy film co-written and directed by S. V. Krishna Reddy and was co-produced by R. R. Venkat. The film stars Jonathan Bennett, Jamie-Lynn Sigler, and Nadia Bjorlin. Upon release, the film received mixed reviews. The movie is based on the director's 1997 Indian Telugu movie Aahwanam.

== Plot ==
Mike Christian falls in love with a Jewish girl, Dylan Lipnick. Her grandparents initially disapprove, but finally agree to their marriage after Mike converts to Judaism. Dylan's parents' divorce badly affected her and she draws up with a long prenup that Mike signs without reading. They honeymoon and return to the house the grandparents have bought for them.

After four months of marriage, Mike comes up with the idea of franchising the family business to make money, he is joined in this by his best pal Scotty. After putting together a business plan they approach a large business only to find the CEO is on her way to a golf/business week. Dylan takes out a new Visa card to allow Mike to track the CEO down and broker the business deal because this will make for a "happy husband". Mike tracks the CEO down in Scottsdale, Arizona and finds she is actually Alex Birch, the girl he was supposed to take to prom 13 years earlier and did not happen due to interference from her dad. The spark that was there before reignites and they start a relationship. Mike e-mails Dylan to ask for a divorce and immediately afterwards finds out she is pregnant. Following the prenup, Dylan refuses the divorce; the prenup has a clause that a divorce can only happen with a formal divorce ceremony, with everyone from the original wedding and the bride and groom in their original clothes. This has to be followed by a formal ceremony paid for by the person wanting a divorce. Also, the person bringing the divorce has to explain the reasons.

Mike spends a lot of time organizing the ceremony and getting people to attend. On the day of the divorce ceremony, he decides he loves Dylan and apologizes to Alex, and stays with his wife.

== Cast ==
- Jonathan Bennett as Mike
- Jamie-Lynn Sigler as Dylan
- Nadia Bjorlin as Alex
- Keith Robinson as Scott
- Elliott Gould as Dylan's grandfather
- Lainie Kazan as Dylan's grandmother
- Andrea Bowen as Melanie
- Paul Sorvino as Daniel Miller
- Richard Kind as George Mason
- Maeve Quinlan as Pam

== Reception ==
Gordon Shelly of Influx Magazine rated the film 7.5 out of 10 and wrote, "It is flawed, and at times, seems to miss some opportunities at comedy, but ultimately it strives to be a story of conflict, resolution and redemption". One Guy's Opinion wrote, "Divorce Invitation travels through a couple of weirdly unseemly comic episodes before arriving at the third—indicated by the title—which is even more peculiarly unfunny. It’s a misfire on almost all counts".
