= Veera Ranachandi =

2017 Kannada-language action film

- Directed by: Anand P Raju
- Produced by: V Kuppu Swamy
- Starring: Ragini Dwivedi; Nagashekar; Ramesh Bhat; Sharath Lohitashwa
- Music by: S. P. Venkatesh
- Production company: Vijayakumari Films
- Distributed by: Super Good Combines
- Release date: 10 March 2017
- Country: India
- Language: Kannada

Veera Ranachandi is a 2017 Indian Kannada-language action film directed by Anand P Raju and produced by V Kuppu Swamy under Vijayakumari Films. The film stars Ragini Dwivedi in the lead role as a determined woman seeking justice. It was released on 10 March 2017.

== Plot ==
The film centers on a woman, portrayed by Ragini Dwivedi, who transforms into a fierce avenger after a personal tragedy. She confronts corrupt forces in a narrative that blends action and drama. Critics observed that while it aimed to present a female-led action story, the plot suffered from a lack of depth and coherence.

== Cast ==
- Ragini Dwivedi as Veera Ranachandi
- Nagashekar
- Ramesh Bhat
- Sharath Lohitashwa
- Harry Josh
- Shobaraj
- Kempegowda
- Amith
- Lokesh Bhajarangi
- Mysore Mallesh
- Mohan Juneja
- Rockline Sudhakar

== Production ==
Produced by Teja Cinemas, Veera Ranachandi was marketed as an action film featuring Ragini Dwivedi performing her own stunts. The film sought to build on her reputation as a prominent actress in Kannada cinema.

== Release and reception ==
Veera Ranachandi was released theatrically on 10 March 2017 in Karnataka. It underperformed at the box office, facing competition and mixed critical reception.

=== Critical reception ===
The New Indian Express lauded Ragini Dwivedi’s performance, describing her as a "roaring, ravishing tigress" who anchored the film. However, The News Minute critiqued it for underutilizing its female protagonist and delivering a weak script. The Times of India gave it a rating of 2.5/5, praising the action sequences but noting a lack of originality. Kannada-language reviews from Vijaya Karnataka and Prajavani similarly appreciated Dwivedi’s effort but found the execution inconsistent.
