= Lakshmi (2013 film) =

- Official poster
- Directed by: Raghava Loki
- Written by: Raghava Loki; M. S. Ramesh
- Produced by: Bhaskar
- Starring: Shiva Rajkumar; Priyamani
- Cinematography: K. S. Chandrashekar
- Edited by: K. M. Prakash
- Music by: Gurukiran
- Production company: Bharani Minerals
- Distributed by: Vajreshwari Combines
- Release date: 18 January 2013
- Country: India
- Language: Kannada

Lakshmi is a 2013 Indian Kannada-language action film directed by Raghava Loki starring Shiva Rajkumar and Priyamani. The film marks Shivarajkumar's 102nd venture, and is produced by Bhaskar of Bharani Minerals. Gurukiran has composed the music and K. S. Chandrashekar is the cinematographer. Stunts are by Thriller Manju.

== Plot ==
Lakshmi Narayan is a CBI officer, who is assigned to investigate human trafficking and embezzlement by a dreaded terrorist Khan. He leads a happy life with his dutiful and loving wife Priya. One day, Priya goes missing after she discovers that her husband has secret weapons stashed in their bedroom. Priya becomes an object of suspicion and Lakshmi learns that she has fled with a terrorist. Lakshmi searches for Priya and learns that she is in Hong Kong and find his 5-yr old daughter DashaLakshmi. ACP Prakash is in search of Lakshmi, who is responsible for kidnapping of an international dancer and murder of a rich boy (The dancer was actually a disguised terrorist Yusuf Khan and the rich boy is actually a specialist, who are working for Khan).

Prakash finds that Lakshmi is in Hong Kong and heads their to find him. He reaches Priya's house and tries to arrest him, but is attacked by Khan's associates when Lakshmi, along with his airport taxi driver Raj aka Deal Raj had gone to Khan's casino to search for Priya. They escape in hidden basement where Priya has stored secret weapons and photos of the terrorist and criminals. Prakash finds Lakshmi's true identity and regrets his actions. Raj identifies one of the men and Lakshmi, along with Prakash and Raj learn that Priya is living under a fake identity as Reshma, who is now a part of Khan's terrorist organization. Khan finds that the CBI planted a mole in his gang and finds that Priya is the mole. Khan tortures Priya to extract information, but doesn't divulge.

Lakshmi barges into the basement and kills the bodyguards. Lakshmi finds Priya and attempts to kill her for the treachery, but is interrupted by his senior CBI officer, who reveals that Priya is part of the CBI's covert operation and is assigned to bust down Khan and the terrorists organizations. Realizing his mistake, Lakshmi reconciles with Priya and leaves for Khan's headquarters where he confronts Khan where he learns the latter's plan of destroying the city with nuclear bombs. Lakshmi tortures Khan's family with Prakash's help and manages to deactivate the bomb where he also cracks the code and extracts the black money, along with politician and terrorist's names involved in the scam. Lakshmi kills Khan and the politicians are arrested. Later, Lakshmi, along with Dashu and Priya leave for Bangalore and Raj is appointed as a CBI officer.

== Cast ==
- Shiva Rajkumar as CBI officer Lakshmi Narayan
- Priyamani as Priya Lakshmi Narayan
- Saloni Aswani as Lakshmi's junior officer
- Ashish Vidyarthi as Khan, a dreaded terrorist and businessman
- Rangayana Raghu as Deal Raj
- Komal Kumar
- Avinash as Lakshmi's senior CBI officer
- Vincent Asokan
- Rukmini
- Dilip Raj
- Ravi Kale as ACP Prakash
- Yathiraj
- Mohan Juneja
- Mico Shivu
- Bus Kumar
- Gym Ravi as Police Constable
- Sakshi Pradhan in a cameo appearance in the song "Lakshmi No One Can Touch Me"

== Production ==
The official announcement for the movie was made on 30 December 2011. Held at Freedom Park in Bangalore, the event was attended by many film personalities. Director Duniya Soori shot the first clap, while Parvathamma Rajkumar, Raghavendra Rajkumar, Shruti among others were present for the event. The first schedule of the film was held, Theschedule was shot entirely Bore at Hong Kong and Macau.

== Soundtrack ==
Lakshmi

Soundtrack album by Gurukiran
- Released: 2013
- Recorded: 2013
- Genre: Feature film soundtrack
- Length: 20:40
- Language: Kannada

Official audio
- Lakshmi - Full Album on YouTube

Track listing
No.	Title	Singer(s)	Length
1.	"Come Come"	Udit Narayan, Shamita Malnad	4:22
2.	"Naanu Footpathnalli"	Shivarajkumar, Chaitra H. G.	4:15
3.	"Neenene Neenene"	Udit Narayan, Anuradha Bhat	4:39
4.	"Pusy Cat"	Chaitra H. G.	3:58
5.	"Lakshmi No One Can Touch Me"	Sukhwinder Singh	4:06
Total length:			20:40

== Critical reception ==
A critic from Rediff.com wrote that "The film has nothing much to offer except some stunning images of Hong Kong. Go for it if you want to see the locales of Hong Kong and its skyline". A critic from The Times of India scored the film at 3.5 out of 5 stars and wrote "Shivrajkumar steals the show. Priya Mani is impressive. Ashish Vidyarthi has done a wonderful job as a terrorist. KS Chandrasehar’s cinematography is brilliant. Music by Gurukiran has some catchy tunes. But it is MS Ramesh’s dialogues that give life to each and every sequence". Shruti I.L from DNA scored the film at 1 out of 2 stars and says "Just like the film scenes, even the music is generously borrowed. You could do without watching this film if you are not a die hard Shivarajkumar fan. The posters say that the film is high voltage drama, we say it’s just a shock — an unpleasant one!". A critic from News18 India wrote "Guru Kiran provides good background score, but his compositions could have been better. The work of art department is very good. 'Lakshmi' is tailor-made for Shivakumar fans, but still it has many engaging elements to keep family audience happy". B S Srivani from Deccan Herald wrote "Song conception is nice, so are the sets and the amount of CGI work gone behind the scenes. Climax brings Sippy’s post- Sholay work Shaan to mind. Much better than “Shiva,” Lakshmi is definitely worth a watch". A Shardhaa from The New Indian Express wrote "Cinematographer KS Chandrashekar has given a visual treat making good use of the locations. Songs from Gurukiran is a mix of melodious and peppy numbers. But the rhythm and background seems to have been inspired by Bollywood films. The Verdict: If you are looking for some action, here you go".
