= Catherine Tresa =

Indian actress and model

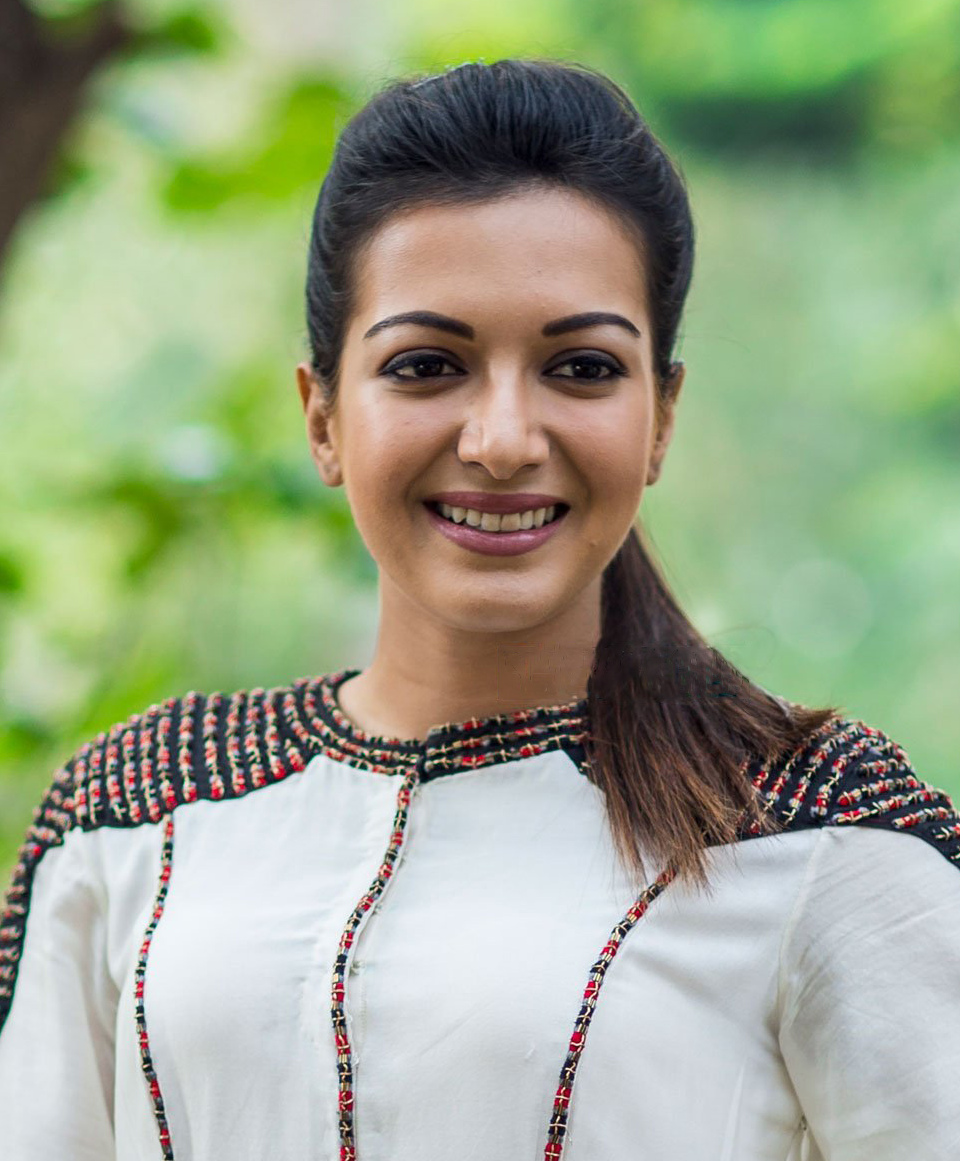
- Tresa in 2018
- Born: Catherine Tresa Alexander; 10 September 1989 (age 37); Dubai, United Arab Emirates
- Citizenship: India
- Occupations: Actress; model
- Years active: 2010–present

Catherine Tresa Alexander (born 10 September 1989) is an Indian actress and model. She has established her career in Tamil, Telugu, Kannada & Malayalam films. She made her film debut in 2010 in the film Shankar IPS.

== Early life ==
Catherine Tresa was born to Malayali parents, Frank Mario Alexander and Tresa Alexander in Dubai. She finished her high school education in Dubai and moved to Bengaluru for higher education. While studying, she learnt to play piano, and got trained in singing, dancing, ice skating and debating, stating that she believes she is "good at anything I put my mind to". In Dubai, Catherine was an Emirates Environment volunteer. At the age of 14, Catherine did amateur modelling for fashion design graduate students. After moving to India, she modeled for Nalli Silks, Chennai Silks, Fast Track, Josco Jewellers and Deccan Chronicle. She has also shot for Srikantadatta Wodeyar's Maharaja Calendar and collaborated with Prasad Bidapa in numerous ramp shows across India.

== Career ==
Catherine made her acting debut in 2010 Kannada film Shankar IPS opposite Duniya Vijay. Catherine went on to act in the Malayalam films, The Thriller and Uppukandam Brothers: Back in Action. In 2011, she did a role in the Kannada film Vishnu that she said was "equally opposite to her real life".

It was followed by the Kannada film Godfather (2012) opposite Upendra, which was directed by cinematographer turned film-maker Sethu Sriram. Catherine's character in the film was that of an older mentally challenged woman. Her performance earned her her first nomination for an award in the Best Supporting Actress category at the 60th Filmfare Awards South.

She next signed up for Chammak Challo directed by Neelakanta, in which she played "an urbane, bold and dynamic girl". It released in February 2013 and failed at the box office, but she got noticed and received positive reviews. APHerald.com called her "a treat to watch" and 123telugu.com noted that "she has the potential to be a superstar in future if she plays her cards right".

Catherine played one of the female leads in Puri Jagannadh's Telugu film Iddarammayilatho. The film released in June 2013 and won her rave reviews. Times of India reported "Catherine Tresa perfectly suits the character of Akanksha". Shirirag.com called her "cigarette smoking hot" while Idlebrain Jeevi in his review noted "with a bit of fine-tuning she can become big in Telugu films".

Catherine next appeared in Paisa (2014) by Krishna Vamsi playing a Muslim girl in the film, "who is sweet, very inhibited and talks a lot with her eyes" and called it "a total contrast to what I play[ed] in Chammak Challo". She made her foray into the Tamil film industry with Madras (2014) in which she starred opposite Karthi. She then appeared in two Telugu films: Erra Bus (2014), directed and produced by Dasari Narayana Rao. followed by Gunasekhar's Rudhramadevi (2015). the first Indian 3D historic film.

The next Tamil film was Pandiraj"s Kathakali (2016) starring Vishal followed by Kalaipuli S. Thanu production, Kanithan (2016) directed by débutante Santosh in which she will be starring opposite Atharvaa. She was seen in the action-drama film such as Sarrainodu (2016), Goutham Nanda (2017) and Nene Raju Nene Mantri (2017) which have received positive reviews.She also worked with the director Sundar C in the comedy films, Kalakalappu 2 (2018), Vantha Rajavathaan Varuven (2019) and Gangers (2025).

== Filmography ==
Key
†	Denotes films that have not yet been released

=== Films ===
Year	Title	Role(s)	Language(s)	Notes	Ref.
2010	Shankar IPS	Shilpa	Kannada		
2010	The Thriller	Meera	Malayalam		
2011	Uppukandam Brothers: Back in Action	Vinila Sathyaneshan	Malayalam		
2011	Vishnu		Kannada		
2012	Godfather	Vaani	Kannada		
2013	Chammak Challo	Sunaina	Telugu		
2013	Iddarammayilatho	Akansha	Telugu		
2014	Paisa	Noor	Telugu	Credited as Catherine	
2014	Madras	Kalaiarasi	Tamil		
2014	Erra Bus	Raji	Telugu		
2015	Rudhramadevi	Annambika	Telugu		
2016	Kathakali	Meenu Kutty	Tamil		
2016	Kanithan	Anu	Tamil		
2016	Sarrainodu	MLA Hansitha Reddy	Telugu		
2017	Kadamban	Rathi	Tamil		
2017	Goutham Nanda	Mugdha	Telugu		
2017	Nene Raju Nene Mantri	Devika Rani	Telugu		
2017	Jaya Janaki Nayaka	Herself	Telugu	Special appearance in the song "A for Apple"	
2017	Kathanayagan	Kanmani	Tamil		
2018	Kalakalappu 2	Hema	Tamil		
2019	Vantha Rajavathaan Varuven	Priya	Tamil		
2019	Neeya 2	Divya	Tamil		
2019	Aruvam	Jyothi	Tamil		
2020	World Famous Lover	Smita	Telugu		
2022	Bhala Thandanana	Sasirekha "Sasi"	Telugu		
2022	Bimbisara	Aira	Telugu		
2022	Macherla Niyojakavargam	Nidhi	Telugu		
2023	Waltair Veerayya	Dr. Nithya	Telugu		
2025	Gangers	Sujitha	Tamil		
2026	Mana Shankara Vara Prasad Garu	Jwaala	Telugu		
2026	Sigma	Sulochana	Tamil	Special appearance in a song	
TBA	Karikaala †	TBA	Telugu, Hindi, Tamil	Filming	
TBA	Phani †	TBA	Filming		

== Awards and nominations ==
Year	Award	Category	Film	Result	Ref.
2013	60th Filmfare Awards South	Best Supporting Actress – Kannada	Godfather	Nominated	
2014	3rd South Indian International Movie Awards	Best Female Debut – Telugu	Chammak Challo	Nominated	
2015	Ananda Vikatan Cinema Awards	Best Debut Actress	Madras	Won	
2015	Vijay Awards	Best Debut Actress	Madras	Won	
2015	Edison Awards	Best Debut Actress	Madras	Won	
2015	62nd Filmfare Awards South	Best Actress – Tamil	Madras	Nominated	
2015	62nd Filmfare Awards South	Best Female Debut – Tamil	Madras	Won	
2015	4th South Indian International Movie Awards	Best Female Debut – Tamil	Madras	Won	
2018	65th Filmfare Awards South	Best Supporting Actress – Telugu	Nene Raju Nene Mantri	Nominated	
