= Chammak Challo (film) =

- Directed by: Neelakanta
- Written by: Neelakanta
- Produced by: Srinivas Rao Dammalapati
- Starring: Varun Sandesh; Sanchita Padukone; Catherine Tresa; Vennela Kishore; Srinivas Avasarala
- Cinematography: Ranganath Gogineni
- Edited by: V. Nagi Reddy
- Music by: Kiran Varanasi
- Production company: Shri Sailendra Cinemas
- Release date: 15 February 2013
- Country: India
- Language: Telugu

Chammak Challo is a 2013 Indian Telugu film directed by Neelakanta starring Varun Sandesh, Sanchita Padukone and Catherine Tresa. The film has a tagline "Love Ki Logic Ledu" and features music by Kiran Varanasi while Ranganath Gogineni and Nagi Reddy handled the cinematography and editing, respectively. The film's title is based off the Hindi song of the same name.

== Plot ==
Kishore (Srinivas Avasarala) is a non-resident Indian who lives in California, United States. He has resigned from his job and has come to India because he wants to become a movie director. He wants to make a different story but someone from the film fraternity tells him that he should instead tell a love story in a different way as love stories are so popular.

Kishore watches Telugu romance movies from the last 70 years but is unable to gain true inspiration from these. One day he goes to a park and talks to a college professor named Apparao Aggarwal (Sayaji Shinde) who tells him a love story that he witnessed between a boy and a girl in his communications class.

Shyam (Varun Sandesh) and Anshu (Sanchita Padukone) have a group of common friends. One day Apparao sees Anshu get off Shyam's motorcycle and asks Shyam if there is something between them. They say no, and soon all the students and professors in the college know what Apparao said. Everyone humiliates Apparao and he vows to make Anshu and Shyam actually fall in love with each other and get his prestige back. Apparao's many attempts to make them love each other (including sending a love letter to Anshu as Shyam) end up failing and he is humiliated over and over again until he finally gives up.

One day when Anshu, Shyam and their friends go to Cudappah the boys meet a bird photographer who says that beauty is in the heart and not in the body. Shyam then realizes that although he wants to marry someone who looks like Katrina Kaif, he should love not the body but the heart. He then sees Anshu and realizes that he is in love with her. After returning from Cudappah, Shyam tries to convince Anshu to love him and finally succeeds. They both get engaged but for a reason that Apparao doesn't know they break up before marriage.

Kishore tracks down Shyam and asks him why he broke up with Anshu. Shyam explains that after the engagement, he had to go to Bangalore for six months for job related reasons. There he met his boss, Sunaina (Catherine Tresa) who he got attracted to since she looks like Katrina Kaif. After 3 months, Anshu came for a surprise visit and found out about Shyam's relationship with Sunaina and, thinking that he is having an affair with her. She reveals that the actual reason she came to Bangalore was that Shyam forgot her birthday. Afterwards Shyam went to Anshu's house many times and begged her for mercy.

Kishore now sends Shyam to Bangalore to meet Sunaina. Shyam, Sunaina, and Shyam's parents come to Anshu's house to call off the engagement and announce that Sunaina and Shyam are getting married. Anshu then gets angry at Shyam and asks Sunaina what guarantee she has that Shyam won't cheat on her. Sunaina responds by saying that Shyam and Sunaina were merely friends and it was Anshu who had left Shyam, and not the other way. Shyam then takes out Anshu's wedding ring, which she had thrown at Shyam when she came to Bangalore. He asks Anshu if she will marry him. Anshu now realizes that this was all a scheme to get Anshu to marry Shyam. She accepts. Apparao and Kishore come in from their hiding spot. Sunaina congratulates Kishore for his brilliant idea. Kishore is happy that his movie has been completed. Apparao suggests that he name his movie "Chammak Challo", which means beautiful girl.

== Cast ==
- Varun Sandesh as Shyam
- Sanchita Padukone as Anshu / Anjali
- Catherine Tresa as Sunaina
- Srinivas Avasarala as Kishore
- Sayaji Shinde as Apparao Aggarwal Shyam foster's father
- Brahmaji as Shyam's father
- Sivaji Raja as Shyam's brother-in-law
- Vennela Kishore as Shyam's friend
- Naramalli Sivaprasad
- Srikanth Iyyengar as Anshu's father
- Chinmayi Ghatrazu
- Surekha Vani as Anasuya
- Allari Subhashini
- Shankar Melkote as Sunaina and Shyam's boss
- Satya as Shyam's friend
- Gautham Raju as a doctor (uncredited)

== Soundtrack ==
Chammak Challo

Soundtrack album to Chammak Challo by Kiran Varanasi
- Released: 10 November 2012
- Recorded: 2011–2012
- Genre: Feature film soundtrack
- Language: Telugu
- Label: Aditya Music
- Producer: Kiran Varanasi

The music was composed by Kiran Varanasi. The film’s audio was launched in November of 2012 with Sampath Nandi and Tammareddy Bharadwaja attending the event as special guests.

Track list
No.	Title	Lyrics	Artist(s)	Length
1.	"Boom Boom"	Kiran Varanasi	Kiran Varanasi, G. Sahithi
2.	"Simplega Cheppala"	Anantha Sreeram	Hemachandra, Harshika
3.	"Chandamamapai Kundelaa"	Anantha Sreeram	Sri Krishna, Madhu
4.	"Yedo Maikam"	Kiran Varanasi	Kiran Varanasi
5.	"O Meri Mehabooba"	Anantha Sreeram	Varun Sandesh
6.	"Naa Kallalona"	Anantha Sreeram	Hemachandra
7.	"Katrina"	Kiran Varanasi	Hemachandra
8.	"Naalone"	Sirasri	Hemachandra, Malavika, Sabeeha

== Reception ==
A critic from The Times of India wrote that "All in all it ends up neither being entirely funny nor heart tugging offering you somewhat of an “in-between” experience".
