= Gurukiran =

Indian music composer, singer

Gurukiran Shetty
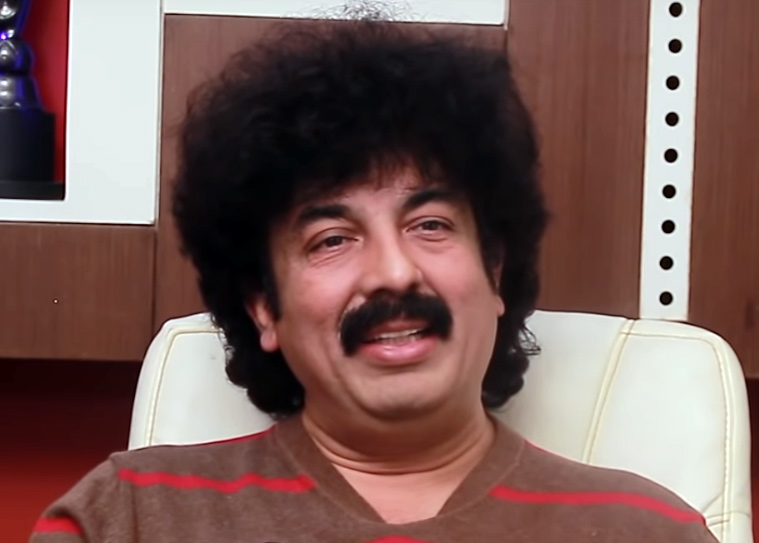
- Gurukiran (2020)
- Born: 28 October 1970 (age 55); Mangalore, Karnataka, India
- Occupations: Actor, singer, music director
- Years active: 1994–present

Gurukiran Shetty, known mononymously as Gurukiran, is an Indian film actor and playback singer, music director of the Kannada film industry in India. He started his career as a music director of the Kannada movie A, directed and acted by Upendra. His music for his next movie Upendra further consolidated his position in Kannada movie industry. He is a native of Mangalore and hails from Bunt Family. His mother tongue is Tulu. He has also acted in several movies in supporting character roles and also sung several songs and also composed in Tamil, Telugu and Tulu movies.

== Career ==
Gurukiran entered the film industry as an actor before becoming a music director. He had sung many songs in Kannada films in his own composition as well as others."Kanasina Maratta" song sung by him, is a big hit in Banna Bannada Loka; Thomas Rathnam directed the music.

== Personal life ==
He is married to Pallavi, who is a cousin of actor Sunil.

== Partial discography ==
=== Composer ===
Year	Film Title	Notes	Ref.
1998	A		
1999	Upendra		
1999	Idu Entha Premavayya		
2001	Majnu		
2001	Asura		
2001	Premi No.1		
2001	Chitra		
2002	Nandhi		
2002	Appu		
2002	Ninagagi		
2002	Chandu		
2002	Thuntata		
2002	Love You		
2002	Dhruva		
2002	Dhumm		
2002	Nata	Remake of Priyamudan; 1 song only	
2002	Hollywood		
2003	Kariya		
2003	Sachi		
2003	Abhi		
2003	Sri Ram		
2003	Panchali		
2003	Khushi		
2003	Partha		
2003	Gokarna		
2004	Kanti		
2004	Apthamitra		
2004	Maurya		
2005	Rishi		
2005	Aadi		
2005	Sye		
2005	Auto Shankar		
2005	Jogi		
2005	Namma Basava		
2005	Nammanna		
2005	Rama Shama Bhama		
2006	Shubham		
2006	Chellata		
2006	Gandugali Kumara Rama		
2007	Yogi	Telugu film	
2007	Maharathi	Telugu film	
2007	Ekadantha		
2007	Parattai Engira Azhagu Sundaram	Tamil film	
2007	Pallakki		
2007	Santha		
2007	Sathyavan Savithri		
2007	Lava Kusha		
2008	Bindaas		
2008	Satya in Love		
2008	Aramane		
2008	Nee Tata Naa Birla		
2008	Anthu Inthu Preethi Banthu	Remake of Aadavari Matalaku Arthale Verule; 3 songs reused from said film	
2008	Beladingalagi Baa		
2008	Kaadambari	TV serial	
2009	Gulama		
2009	Kempa		
2009	Gautham		
2009	Thaakath		
2009	Jeeva		
2010	Aptharakshaka		
2010	Sugreeva		
2010	Shankar IPS		
2010	Mr. Theertha		
2010	Nagavalli	Telugu film	
2010	Mylari		
2011	Allide Nammane Illi Bande Summane		
2012	Arakshaka		
2012	Govindaya Namaha		
2012	Villain		
2012	Shiva		
2012	Sri Kshetra Adichunchanagiri		
2012	Telikeda Bolli	Tulu film	
2013	Lakshmi		
2013	Dasavala		
2014	Brahma		
2014	Rangan Style		
2015	Aarambha		
2015	Uppi 2		
2015	A 2nd Hand Lover		
2016	Nagarahavu		
2017	Chowka		
2018	Amma I Love You		
2019	Ayushman Bhava		
2025	Full Meals		
2026	Raktha Kashmira		
2026	Gharga	Only one song	

== Filmography ==
Year	Film	Role	Notes	Ref.
1990	Mouna Horata			
1993	Nishkarsha	Baldev		
1994	Sagara Deepa			
1994	Gandugali	Sampath		
1996	Soma			
1996	Rangoli			
1998	A	Actor		
1999	Channappa Channegowda	Raja		
1999	Upendra	Nair		
2000	Swalpa Adjust Madkolli			
2000	Indradhanush			
2001	Valee	Ravi	Guest appearance	
2003	Kutumba		Special appearance	
2007	Ekadantha	Himself	Special appearance	
2011	Oriyardori Asal		Special appearance	

== Awards ==
Karnataka State Film Awards:

- 2011 – Karnataka State Film Award for Best Music Director – Mylari

South Indian International Movie Awards

- Nominated —2012 – SIIMA Award for Best Music Director – Govindaya Namaha

Filmfare Awards South:

- 2001 – Filmfare Award for Best Music Director - Kannada – Chitra
- 2002 – Filmfare Award for Best Music Director - Kannada – Dhum
