= Vikramarkudu =

2006 Indian film by S. S. Rajamouli

- Theatrical release poster
- Directed by: S. S. Rajamouli
- Screenplay by: S. S. Rajamouli
- Story by: V. Vijayendra Prasad
- Dialogues by: M. Rathnam
- Produced by: M. L. Kumar Chowdary
- Starring: Ravi Teja; Anushka
- Cinematography: Sarvesh Murari
- Edited by: Kotagiri Venkateswara Rao
- Music by: M. M. Keeravani
- Production company: Sri Keerthi Creations
- Release date: 23 June 2006 (India)
- Running time: 161 minutes
- Country: India
- Language: Telugu
- Budget: ₹11 crore
- Box office: est. ₹19 crore distributor share

Vikramarkudu is a 2006 Indian Telugu-language action comedy film film co-written and directed by S. S. Rajamouli, based on a story by V. Vijayendra Prasad. The film is produced by M. L. Kumar Chowdary. It stars Ravi Teja and Anushka. The music was composed by M. M. Keeravani, with cinematography by Sarvesh Murari. The plot follows a thief who encounters a young girl claiming to be his daughter, leading him to uncover his connection to her real father, a look-alike with a turbulent past.

Vikramarkudu was released on 23 June 2006 with 180 prints globally. Made on a budget of ₹11 crore (equivalent to ₹39 crore or US$4.1 million in 2026), Vikramarkudu was a blockbuster earning a distributor share of ₹19 crore (equivalent to ₹67 crore or US$7.1 million in 2026). The film was screened at the International Film Festival of India in the mainstream section.

The film was remade in several languages, including Bangladeshi Bengali as Ulta Palta 69 (2007), Kannada as Veera Madakari (2009), Tamil as Siruthai (2011), Indian Bengali as Bikram Singha (2012), Hindi as Rowdy Rathore (2012), and once again in Bangladeshi Bengali as Action Jasmine (2015), featuring a female lead.

== Plot ==
Athili Satthi Babu is a petty thief who operates alongside his maternal uncle, Duvva Abbulu, in Hyderabad. At a wedding, he meets Neeraja, a young woman residing in Devgarh, Madhya Pradesh. For some reason, Satthi Babu also has a habit of despising children. After a brief period of courtship, Neeraja falls in love with him. Satthi Babu confesses his criminal profession and promises to reform, but resolves to pull off one final, highly lucrative heist. At a railway station, Satthi Babu and Abbulu deceive a woman into parting with a large trunk and flee with it. When they open the trunk under Inspector Mahanti's watchful eye, they are shocked to find a young girl named Neha inside. Believing Satthi Babu to be her father, Neha refuses to leave his side. Mahanti forces a reluctant Satthi Babu to care for the child under police surveillance.

While examining Neha's belongings, Satthi Babu finds a portrait of her with her real father, ASP Vikram Singh Rathore IPS—an uncompromising police officer and Satthi Babu's doppelgänger. Concurrently, Rathore is in Hyderabad hunting down criminals when he suffers a severe, debilitating headache and collapses at a construction site. At the hospital, doctors reveal that Rathore is suffering from an advanced, terminal brain tumour, yet he remains deeply anxious to reunite with his daughter.

Initially resentful of his forced guardianship, Satthi Babu returns home intoxicated one evening and aggressively breaks Neha’s walkman. Upon waking the next morning, he finds her weeping because she can no longer listen to a recorded cassette of her deceased mother’s voice. Deeply remorseful, Satthi Babu repairs the device, an act that wins Neha's affection and melts his heart. He genuinely begins to care for her. However, complications arise when Neeraja and her parents overhear Neha addressing Satthi Babu as her father. Believing he has fathered a child and deceived her, a heartbroken Neeraja abruptly terminates their relationship. Shortly after, a ruthless pack of mercenaries ambushes Satthi Babu and Neha, mistaking the thief for his police officer lookalike.

Mahanti, Sub-Inspector Razia—the woman from whom the trunk was originally stolen—and several police officers arrive to intervene, but they are quickly overpowered by the assailants. Unexpectedly, a weakened Rathore arrives on the scene to protect his daughter and Satthi Babu. He single-handedly massacres the entire hit squad but sustains critical, near-fatal injuries in the process. While Rathore fights for his life in the intensive care unit, Mahanti narrates the officer's violent past to a stunned Satthi Babu and Abbulu.

Past: Rathore is posted to the lawless district of Devgarh, relocating with Neha. The region is thoroughly terrorised by the sadistic MLA Bavuji and his psychopathic son, Munna, who run an unhindered empire of corruption, extortion, and human trafficking. The crisis escalates when Munna abducts and repeatedly assaults Mahanti's wife. Upon discovering the atrocity, Rathore fiercely storms the compound, rescues the woman, and arrests Munna. Despite immense political pressure from the Home Minister and the Director General of Police, Rathore absolutely refuses to back down. Utilising his political leverage, Bavuji has declared Munna mentally unstable and acquitted him of all charges. At a high-profile victory party organised by Bavuji, Rathore and his team are humiliatingly assigned to secure Munna. When a boastful Munna attempts to strip and humiliate a junior police officer, Rathore covertly utilises a tactical opening to shoot the ground, causing Munna to slip, lose his balance, and hang himself on a loose ceiling belt. Seeking immediate retribution during the festival of Holi, Bavuji's vicious brother, Titla, covertly stabs Rathore under the guise of a religious procession and shoots him while the officer attempts to save a trapped child. Although presumed dead, Rathore survives with a severe, localised brain trauma and is secretly moved to Hyderabad for advanced treatment. To keep Neha safe and oblivious to her father's critical state, the police department strategically directed her toward Satthi Babu after discovering his identical appearance.

Present: Rathore succumbs to his injuries. To spare Neha the trauma, the police and Satthi Babu decide to keep his death a secret. Fueled by a profound sense of justice and a desire to avenge his doppelgänger, Satthi Babu relocates to Devgarh, assumes Rathore's identity, and aggressively targets Bavuji's empire. Abbulu and the police reveal the absolute truth to Neeraja, who deeply apologises for her mistrust, reconciles with Satthi Babu, and promises to help raise Neha. Satthi Babu systematically decimates Bavuji's operations, setting fire to his illegal liquor distillery and encouraging the starved villagers to reclaim looted grain from the politician's private warehouses. In a desperate final move, Titla abducts both Neha and Neeraja to bait the officer. In a showdown, Satthi Babu completely overpowers the syndicate, rescues his family, and hangs Titla to death, while Bavuji turns into a beggar. Having permanently restored law and order to Devgarh. Satthi Babu leaves the village to begin a peaceful new life with Neeraja, Neha, and Abbulu.

== Cast ==
- Ravi Teja in a dual role as
  - Vikram Singh Rathore IPS
  - Athili Sathi Babu, a thief
- Anushka as Neeraja "Neeru" Goswami, Satti Babu's love interest.
- Brahmanandam as Duvva Abbulu, Satti Babu's uncle
- Vineet Kumar as Bavuji (voice dubbed by P. Ravi Shankar)
- Baby Neha as Neha Singh Rathore, Vikram's daughter
- Rajiv Kanakala as Inspector Mahanthi
- Ajay as Titla, Bavuji's younger brother (voice dubbed by P. Ravi Shankar)
- Ruthika as SI Razia Khan
- Chatrapathi Sekhar as a loyal servant to Vikram Singh Rathore
- Madhuri Sen as Inspector Mahanthi's wife
- Amit Tiwari as Munna, Bavuji's son
- Raghu Babu as Bavuji's brother-in-law
- Jaya Prakash Reddy as Home Minister of Madhya Pradesh
- Prabhas Sreenu as Bavuji's Henchman
- Sivannarayana Naripeddi as Wedding guest
- Waheeda as a victim of Satti Babu's thefts

Cameo appearances

- Jyothika as Vikram Singh Rathore's wife (uncredited portrait appearance)
- Prakash Raj as DGP
- Meghna Naidu in an item number appears in the song "Vastavaa".
- Kausha Rach as a Tennis player (appears in the song "College Papala Bussu")
- Annie as Chambal area News Reporter's daughter, where Titla kills the reporter's family, burning them alive in his introduction scene.

== Production ==
The shooting was disrupted by quarry workers who started pelting the film's unit with stones, damaging most of the equipment and injuring some of the film crew, including the director Rajamouli. The quarry workers were asked by the quarry manager to stop their work and leave the area for the shooting of particular scenes. What started as a small miff between the manager and the workers escalated with the workers showering stones, even as the film crew was leaving the quarry in their vehicles. The injured crew members were admitted to Apollo Hospital. Director Rajamouli suffered a hairline fracture to his hand. A formal complaint was lodged against the quarry workers and their owner. Rama Rajmouli used vibrant colors for the thief character of Teja while sober colors was used for his cop character.

== Music ==
Vikramarkudu

Soundtrack album by M. M. Keeravani
- Released: 31 May 2006
- Recorded: 2006
- Studios: RajaNandini Recording Studio, Hyderabad
- Genre: Feature film soundtrack
- Language: Telugu
- Label: Aditya Music
- Producer: M. M. Keeravani

M. M. Keeravani chronology
Sri Ramadasu (2006)	Vikramarkudu (2006)	Amma Cheppindi (2006)

The audio of Vikramarkudu was launched at a function arranged in a set erected near Hitec city on the night of 31 May. K Raghavendra Rao launched the audio and gave the first unit to Y. V. S. Chowdary. Ramesh Prasad, B. Gopal and Gunnam Gangaraju were also invited as guests. The unit members who were present include M. L. Kumar Chowdary, Ravi Teja, Rajamouli, Anushka, Keeravani, Vijayendra Prasad, Brahmanandam, Rajiv Kanakala, Ajay, Rama Rajamouli, Ravindra, Sarvesh Murari, Ram Lakshman, M. Ratnam, Kotagiri Venkateswara Rao and Suresh Bujji. Suma anchored the event and Aditya Music bought audio rights.

The soundtrack received a very good response from the public as well as critics. The song "College Papala" (well known as Chinta Ta Chita Chita) was reused in all of the remakes except for Action Jasmine (2015).

No.	Title	Lyrics	Singer(s)	Length
1.	"Dammare Damma"	Chandrabose	K.S.Chithra, Vijji, Tippu	4:04
2.	"Jum Jum Maya"	M. M. Keeravani	M. M. Keeravani & Sunitha	4:38
3.	"College Papala"	Jonnavittula Ramalingeswara Rao	K.S.Chithra, Jassie Gift	5:06
4.	"Vasthava Vasthava"	Chandrabose	Anuradha Sriram	4:08
5.	"Dooranga"	Bandaru Danaiah, M. M. Keeravani	M. M. Keeravani, Ganga	4:49
6.	"Jo Laali"	M. M. Keeravani	Malavika	2:01
Total length:				24:49

== Reception ==
=== Box office ===
The film was commercially successful and was one of the highest grossers of Telugu cinema in 2006. and a theatrical run of 100 days in 54 centres. Vikramarkudu earned a distributor share of ₹19 crore (equivalent to ₹67 crore or US$7.1 million in 2026). It became Ravi Teja's highest grossing film up until that point, surpassing Amma Nanna O Tamila Ammayi.

=== Critical response ===
It received positive reviews from critics. Idlebrain.com wrote, "On a whole, Vikramarkudu is another prospective blockbuster from the stable of Rajamouli". Totaltollywood wrote, "First half of the film goes in full entertainment mode. Second half gets into action part but the entertainment values are maintained at the same level.". Sify noted, "On the whole, Vikramarkudu is a masala entertainer and is OK timepass fare.". Nowrunning wrote, "Watching Vikramarkudu is like eating a plate of Mirchi Bhajji from the roadside pushcart.". Cinegoer said, "One thing is that Vikramarkudu never bores you. It will keep you glued to the screen, because so many things happen all the time and the narrative moves quickly.".

== Other versions ==
It was remade twice in Bangladeshi Bengali as Ulta Palta 69 and Action Jasmine, in Kannada as Veera Madakari, in Tamil as Siruthai, in Hindi as Rowdy Rathore, and in Indian Bengali as Bikram Singha: The Lion Is Back.

== Sequel ==
In September 2021, V. Vijayendra Prasad began writing the film's sequel, and Sampath Nandi entered into talks for directing it.
