= Chaitra H. G. =

Indian singer

- Origin: Bangalore, India
- Genres: Film, Hindustani classical music
- Occupation: Singer
- Years active: 2000–present

Chaitra H. G. is a Hindustani classical singer and playback singer in the South Indian Film industry known for her works in Kannada films.

== Playback singing ==
Chaitra made her debut as a playback singer at the age of 8. She sang for the movie Beda Krishna Ranginaata singing "Kogileye", composed by V. Manohar.

She was given an opportunity to sing for the music director Rajesh Ramanathan in 2003.

== Television ==
- Judge on "Radio City - Super Singer - 2014", Bangalore.
- Judge on the reality show Amul Sangeeta Mahayuddha on Udaya TV.
- Judge on "Forum Fiza Mall – Super Singer" with music director Mr. Gurukiran and Rajesh Krishnan, Mangalore.
- Hosted "Confident Star Singer - Season 1", which was one of the longest-running music reality shows in the history of Kannada Television.
- Judge on the TV series Paripoorna Mahile on ETV Kannada alongside actress Bharathi Vishnuvardhan.
- Guest judge alongside S. P. Balasubrahmanyam on "Edu Tumbi Haaduvenu" reality show.
- Judge on PublicTV's first reality show, Fresh Voice Of Karnataka, alongside composer Manomurthy.
- Invited as special jury on shows including SaReGaMaPa, Voice of Bangalore and Superstar 2.

Chaitra is the lead actor in the movie " Mavu Bevu "released in 2023.

Chaitra has a diploma in acting and theatre from Abhinaya Taranga Theatre school.

She has been awarded best actress award at the Ahmedabad International Film Festival 2024 for her portrayal of "Nupur" in the movie Mavu Bevu.

== Awards ==
- 2005–06: Karnataka State Film Award for Best Female Playback Singer: "Huduga Huduga" from Amrithadhare
- 2007: Special Mention Award for Young Achievers by Rotary Bangalore Midtown & Brigade Group
- 2012: Udaya TV Kutumba Award for Best Singer: "Jokali"
