= 57th Filmfare Awards South =

Award ceremony for South Indian films

- Date: 7 August 2010
- Site: Chennai, Tamil Nadu, India
- Hosted by: Ganesh Venkatraman and Andrea Jeremiah
- Produced by: Idea Cellular

Highlights
- Best Picture: Maleyali Jotheyali (Kannada); Pazhassi Raja (Malayalam); Naadodigal (Tamil); Magadheera (Telugu)
- Most awards: Pazhassi Raja (7; Malayalam)
- Most nominations: Ayan (11; Tamil)

The 57th Filmfare Awards South ceremony, honoring the winners of the best of South Indian cinema in 2009, was held on 7 August 2010 in Chennai, India.

== Nominations ==
The Filmfare Best Film Award is given by the Filmfare magazine as part of its annual Filmfare Awards for Hindi films. The award was first given in 1954.

The following is a list of the award winners and nominees.

=== Multiple nominations and awards ===
The following films received multiple nominations.

==== Kannada ====
- Nominations
  - 8 nominations: MaLeyali Jotheyali
  - 7 nominations: Jhossh
  - 6 nominations: Love Guru and Parichaya
  - 5 nominations: Savaari
  - 4 nominations: Eddelu Manjunatha
  - 3 nominations: Kallara Santhe, Raaj The Showman and Ram
  - 2 nominations: Birugali and Manasaare
  - 1 nomination: Ambari
- Awards
  - 2 awards: Eddelu Manjunatha*, Jhossh and MaLeyali Jotheyali
  - 1 award: Ambari, Birugali, Love Guru, Manasaare, Raaj The Showman and Savaari

==== Malayalam ====
- Nominations
  - 7 nominations: Bhagyadevatha, Pazhassi Raja
  - 6 nominations: Bhramaram
  - 4 nominations: Evidam Swargamanu, Neelathaamara, Paleri Manikyam and Robin Hood
  - 3 nominations: Passenger, Puthiya Mukham
  - 2 nominations: Banaras and Swantham Lekhakan
  - 1 nomination: Kanakanmani, Moz & Cat, Ritu, Vilapangalkkapuram
- Awards
  - 7 awards: Pazhassi Raja
  - 2 awards: Paleri Manikyam
  - 1 award: Bhramaram* and Neelathaamara

==== Tamil ====
- Nominations
  - 11 nominations: Ayan
  - 7 nominations: Pasanga
  - 6 nominations: Naan Kadavul
  - 5 nominations: Kanchivaram, Aadhavan
  - 4 nominations: Vettaikaaran
  - 3 nominations: Naadodigal
  - 2 nominations: Kanden Kadhalai, Kanthaswamy, Peraanmai, Unnaipol Oruvan and Villu
  - 1 nomination: Achchamundu! Achchamundu!, Padikathavan, Pokkisham and Vennila Kabadi Kuzhu
- Awards
  - 4 awards: Kanchivaram*
  - 3 awards: Ayan and Aadhavan
  - 2 awards: Naadodigal*
  - 1 awards: Naan Kadavul and Pasanga

==== Telugu ====
- Nominations
  - 9 nominations: Arundhati and Magadheera
  - 7 nominations: Arya 2
  - 5 nominations: Konchem Ishtam Konchem Kashtam
  - 4 nominations: Kick
  - 3 nominations: Eenadu and Gopi Gopika Godavari
  - 2 nominations: Billa, Mahatma and Prayanam
  - 1 nomination: Aakasamantha, Banam, Ek Niranjan, Oy! and Pravarakhyudu
- Awards
  - 6 awards: Magadheera*
  - 2 awards: Arundhati & Arya 2
  - 1 award: Josh*, Konchem Ishtam Konchem Kashtam, Mahatma and Oy!*

*: Includes one special award, which has no nominees.

== Awardees ==
- Winners in **bold**, nominees listed under.

=== Kannada ===
| Best Film | Best Director |
|---|---|
| **MaLeyali Jotheyali**; Eddelu Manjunatha; Jhossh; Parichaya; Savaari | **Guruprasad – Eddelu Manjunatha**; Jacob Verghese – Savaari; Prashant Raj – Love Guru; Sanjay – Parichaya; Shivamani – Jhossh |
| Best Actor | Best Actress |
| **Ganesh – Maleyali Jotheyali**; Diganth – Manasaare; Jaggesh – Eddelu Manjunatha; Raghu Mukherjee – Savaari; Tarun Chandra – Parichaya | **Radhika Pandit – Love Guru**; Haripriya – Kallara Santhe; Priyamani – Raam; Priyanka Kothari – Raaj The Showman; Rekha – Parichaya |
| Best Supporting Actor | Best Supporting Actress |
| **Achyuth Kumar – Jhossh**; Dilip Raj – Love Guru; Rangayana Raghu – Raam; Sharan – Josh; Tabla Nani – Eddelu Manjunatha | **Tulasi Shivamani – Jhossh**; Anjana Sukhani – MaLeyali Jotheyali; Nithya Menon – Josh; Suman Ranganath – Savaari; Yagna Shetty – Love Guru |
| Best Music Director | Best Lyricist |
| **V. Harikrishna – Raaj The Showman**; Jassie Gift – Parichaya; Joshua Sridhar – Love Guru; V. Harikrishna – Maleyali Jotheyali; V. Manohar – Kallara Santhe | **Jayanth Kaikini – "Yello Maleyaagide" – Manasaare**; Jayanth Kaikini – "Ni Sanihake Bandare" – Maleyali Jotheyali; Kaviraj – "Shuruvagide Sundara Kanasu" – MaLeyali Jotheyali; Kaviraj – "Thanthane Thanthanthane" – Jhossh; V. Manohar – "Kapadi Kapadi" – Kallara Santhe |
| Best Male Playback Singer | Best Female Playback Singer |
| **Chetan Sosca – "Yaare Nee Devatheya" – Ambari**; Karthik – "Yaaru Kooda Ninna Haage" – Love Guru; K. K. – "Nadedaaduva Kamanabillu" – Parichaya; Shaan – "Shuruvagide Sundara Kanasu" – MaLeyali Jotheyali; Shankar Mahadevan – "Muthuraja" – Raaj The Showman | **Shamitha Malnad – "Madhura Pisu Maathige" – Birugaali**; Nanditha – "Neenendare" – Raam; Sadhana Sargam – "Marali Mareyagi" – Savaari; Shreya Ghoshal – "Hoovina Banadante" – Birugaali; Shreya Ghoshal – "Yenu Helabeku" – Maleyali Jotheyali |

=== Malayalam ===
| Best Film | Best Director |
|---|---|
| **Pazhassi Raja**; Bhagyadevatha; Bhramaram; Evidam Swargamanu; Paleri Manikyam | **Hariharan – Pazhassi Raja**; Blessy – Bhramaram; Ranjith – Paleri Manikyam; Ranjith Sankar – Passenger; Shyamaprasad – Ritu |
| Best Actor | Best Actress |
| **Mammootty – Paleri Manikyam**; Dileep – Swantham Lekhakan; Jayaram – Bhagyadevatha; Mohanlal – Evidam Swargamanu; Prithviraj Sukumaran – Robinhood | **Swetha Menon – Paleri Manikyam**; Gopika – Swantham Lekhakan; Kanika – Bhagyadevatha; Mamta Mohandas – Passenger; Priyanka Nair – Vilapangalkkappuram |
| Best Supporting Actor | Best Supporting Actress |
| **Manoj K. Jayan – Pazhassi Raja**; Lalu Alex – Evidam Swargamanu; Narain – Robinhood; Nedumudi Venu – Bhagyadevatha; Suresh Menon – Bhramaram | **Padmapriya – Pazhassi Raja**; Lakshmi Gopalaswamy – Bhramaram; Lakshmi Rai – Evidam Swargamanu; Samvrutha Sunil – Neelathaamara; Sona Nair – Passenger |
| Best Music Director | Best Lyricist |
| **Vidyasagar – Neelathaamara**; Deepak Dev – Puthiya Mukham; Ilaiyaraaja – Bhagyadevatha; M. Jayachandran – Banaras; M. Jayachandran – Robinhood | **O. N. V. Kurup – "Kunnathe Konna" – Pazhassi Raja**; Anil Panachuran – "Kuzhaloothum" – Bhramaram; Kaithapram – "Pichavacha" – Puthiya Mukham; Sarathchandra Varma – "Azhithira" – Bhagyadevatha; Sarathchandra Varma – "Anuraga" – Neelathaamara |
| Best Male Playback Singer | Best Female Playback Singer |
| **K. J. Yesudas – "Adhi Usha Sandhya" – Pazhassi Raja**; Karthik – "Azhi Thira Thallipoyalum" – Bhagyadevatha; Shankar Mahadevan – "Picha Vacha" – Puthiya Mukham; Shreekumar Vakkiyil – "Anuraga Vilocha" – Neelathaamara; Venugopal – "Kuzaloothi" – Bhramaram | **K. S. Chithra – "Kunnathe Konna" – Pazhassi Raja**; Shreya Ghoshal – "Chanthu Thottille" – Banaras; Shweta Mohan – "Priyanu Mathram" – Robinhood; Shweta Mohan – "Thottal Pookkum" – Moz & Cat; Sujatha Mohan – "Muthe Muthe" – Kanakanmani |

=== Tamil ===
| Best Film | Best Director |
|---|---|
| **Naadodigal**; Ayan; Kanchivaram; Naan Kadavul; Pasanga; Peraanmai | **Priyadarshan – Kanchivaram**; Bala – Naan Kadavul; K. V. Anand – Ayan; Pandiraj – Pasanga; Samuthirakani – Naadodigal; Suseenthiran – Vennila Kabadi Kuzhu |
| Best Actor | Best Actress |
| **Prakash Raj – Kanchivaram**; Arya – Naan Kadavul; Jayam Ravi – Peraanmai; Kamal Haasan – Unnaipol Oruvan; Suriya – Ayan | **Pooja Umashanker – Naan Kadavul**; Padmapriya Janakiraman – Pokkisham; Sriya Reddy – Kanchivaram; Sneha – Achamundu Achamundu; Tamannaah Bhatia – Kandein Kadhalai |
| Best Supporting Actor | Best Supporting Actress |
| **Jayaprakash – Pasanga**; Jagan – Ayan; Prabhu – Ayan; Rajendran – Naan Kadavul; Vadivelu – Aadhavan; Vivek – Padikathavan | **Shammu – Kanchivaram**; Abhinaya – Naadodigal; Anuja Iyer – Unnaipol Oruvan; Renuka – Ayan; Sujatha Sivakumar – Pasanga |
| Best Music Director | Best Lyricist |
| **Harris Jayaraj – Ayan**; Devi Sri Prasad – Kanthaswamy; Devi Sri Prasad – Villu; Harris Jayaraj – Aadhavan; Vidyasagar – Kandein Kadhalai | **Na. Muthukumar – "Vizhi Moodi" – Ayan**; Ilaiyaraaja – "Piychai Paathiram" – Naan Kadavul; Kabilan – "Karikaalan" – Vettaikaaran; Thamarai – "Oru Vetkam" – Pasanga; Vairamuthu – "Nenje Nenje" – Ayan; Vivega – "Chinna Thamarai" – Vettaikaaran |
| Best Male Playback Singer | Best Female Playback Singer |
| **Karthik – "Hasili Fisili" – Aadhavan**; Harish Raghavendra – "Nenje Nenje" – Ayan; Karthik – "Vizhi Moodi" – Ayan; Krish – "Chinna Thamarai" – Vettaikaaran; Naresh Iyer – "Oru Vetkam" – Pasanga; Tippu – "Vaada Mapillai" – Villu | **Chinmayi – "Vaarayo Vaarayo" – Aadhavan**; Harini – "Hasili Fisili" – Aadhavan; Rita – "Allegra" – Kanthaswamy; Shreya Ghoshal – "Oru Vetkam" – Pasanga; Suchitra – "Chinna Thamarai" – Vettaikaaran |

=== Telugu ===
| Best Film | Best Director |
|---|---|
| **Magadheera**; Arundhati; Arya 2; Kick; Konchem Ishtam Konchem Kashtam | **S. S. Rajamouli – Magadheera**; Chaitanya Danthaluri – Banam; Kodi Ramakrishna – Arundhati; Sukumar – Arya 2; Surender Reddy – Kick |
| Best Actor | Best Actress |
| **Ram Charan Teja – Magadheera**; Allu Arjun – Arya 2; Kamal Haasan – Eenadu; Prabhas – Ek Niranjan; Ravi Teja – Kick | **Anushka Shetty – Arundhati**; Kajal Aggarwal – Magadheera; Kamalinee Mukherjee – Gopi Gopika Godavari; Ileana D'Cruz – Kick; Tamannaah Bhatia – Konchem Ishtam Konchem Kashtam |
| Best Supporting Actor | Best Supporting Actress |
| **Sonu Sood – Arundhati**; Prakash Raj – Aakasamantha; Sayaji Shinde – Arundhati; Srihari – Magadheera; Venkatesh – Eenadu | **Ramya Krishnan – Konchem Ishtam Konchem Kashtam**; Kalpika – Prayanam; Lakshmi – Eenadu; Manorama – Arundhati; Namitha – Billa |
| Best Music Director | Best Lyricist |
| **M. M. Keeravani – Magadheera**; Chakri – Gopi Gopika Godavari; Devi Sri Prasad – Arya 2; Koti – Arundhati; Shankar–Ehsaan–Loy – Konchem Ishtam Konchem Kashtam | **Sirivennela Sitaramasastri – "Indiramma" – Mahatma**; Chandrabose – "Panchadara Bomma" – Magadheera; C. Narayana Reddy – "Kammukunna Cheektlona" – Arundhati; Ramajogayya Sastry – "Nuvvakkadunte" – Gopi Gopika Godavari; Vanamali – "Karigeloga Jeevitam" – Arya 2 |
| Best Male Playback Singer | Best Female Playback Singer |
| **Anuj Gurwara – "Panchadara Bomma" – Magadheera**; Baba Sehgal – "Mr. Perfect" – Arya 2; Kailash Kher – "Kammukunna Cheekatlona" – Arundhati; Shankar Mahadevan – "Konchem Ishtam" – Konchem Ishtam Konchem Kashtam; S. P. Balasubrahmanyam – "Indiramma" – Mahatma | **Priya Himesh – "Ringa Ringa" – Arya 2**; Amrita Varshini – "Meghama" – Prayanam; Nikita Nigam – "Dheera Dheera" – Magadheera; Sunidhi Chauhan – "Saradaga" – Oy!; Sunitha – "Neela Neela Mabbulu" – Pravarakhyudu |

=== Special awards ===
- Special Jury Awards:
  - **Mohanlal** – Bhramaram (Malayalam),
  - **Yuvan Shankar Raja** – Oy! (Telugu),
  - **Srinagar Kitty** – Savaari (Kannada)
  - **Yagna Shetty** – Eddelu Manjunatha (Kannada)
- Best Male Debutant: **Naga Chaitanya** – Josh (Telugu)
- Best Female Debutant: **Abhinaya** – Naadodigal (Tamil)
- Best Cinematographer:
  - **K.K. Senthil Kumar** – Magadheera (Telugu)
- Best Choreography:
  - **Prem Rakshith** – Arya 2 (Telugu)
  - **Dinesh** – Ayan (Tamil)
- Lifetime Achievement Awards:
  - **K. P. A. C. Lalitha**
  - **Ambareesh**

== See also ==
- Filmfare Awards South
- Filmfare Awards
- 2009 in film
- Tamil Nadu State Film Awards
- Nandi Awards
