= Dileep Raj =

Indian actor, director and producer (1978–2026)

- Born: 2 September 1978; Bengaluru, Karnataka, India
- Died: 13 May 2026 (aged 47); Bengaluru, Karnataka, India
- Occupations: Actor; television producer; director; dubbing artist
- Years active: 1997–2026
- Spouse: Srividya (m. 2001)
- Children: 2

Dileep Raj (2 September 1978 – 13 May 2026) was an Indian actor, television director and producer known for his work in Kannada television and cinema. He appeared in 24 films and produced many television serials under his banner DR Creations.

After beginning his career as an actor appearing in television serials, Raj made his film debut with Boyfriend (2005). He was noted for his role as an antagonist in Milana (2007). Other films he appeared in include U Turn (2016), Orchestra Mysuru (2023) and Nimma Vasthugalige Neeve Javaabdaararu (2025). His final film appearance came in Love Mocktail (2026). Raj also acted on stage, including a leading role in the play Treadmill.

Raj however received recognition for his television work, first as an actor and later as producer and director. With his wife Srividya, he produced Vidya Vinayaka (2017) and Paaru (2018–2024), and starred in produced Hitler Kalyana (2021–2024). He died from a heart attack on 13 May 2026, aged 47.

== Career ==
Raj began his acting career on stage. After winning an award at a college fest, he took to amateur theatre. He associated himself with renowned theatre groups such as Nataranga and Drishti. After being introduced to television by noted actress Nanditha, Raj made his debut with the telefilm Kambada Mane in 1997. He then appeared in Janani as the grandson of Bharathi Vishnuvardhan's character. He went on to appear in other television serials such as Ardha Satya, Rangoli, Kumkuma Bhagya, Mangalya, Malebillu, Preetigaagi, and Rathasapthami. In Rathasapthami, based a true incident, he played Jeevan, a negative-shaded character. Raj called him "...a schemer who goes about harming everyone who comes close to understanding his dubious ways."

Raj's film debut came in 2005, when he was offered a role in Boyfriend. The makers had not finalized on who would play the male lead. After the media mistook him as the lead actor, he was offered the role. The film failed to perform commercially. After film roles failed to come his way, Raj returned to television, playing a negative role in Mangalya, while also appearing in Malebillu. He was then offered the role of the antagonist in Milana, with Puneeth Rajkumar and Parvathy Thiruvothu playing the lead roles. The film was a massive commercial success. However, upon not receiving starring roles, Raj again returned to television after appearing in Love Guru (2009) and Gaana Bajaana (2010). Raj was also worked a dubbing artist starting with Jogi (2005). In Aa Dinagalu (2007), he dubbed for Chethan Kumar's character.

Raj worked as the Fiction Head for Colors Kannada in 2015. In 2014, he ventured into television production with his banner DR Creations. Previously, he assisted director Jayanth for the serial Sahagamana. Under DR Creations, he produced multiple extended-running television shows for major networks such as Colors Kannada, Star Suvarna and Zee Kannada. His projects combined traditional Kannada cultural elements with contemporary filmmaking methods. Raj became popular for his role in Hitler Kalyana, a serial he also produced.

In 2017, Raj produced the comedy show Majaa Bharatha. In its first season, it completed 52 episodes. His final film appearance came in Love Mocktail 3, in which played Sanjay, an advocate. A micro-series titled Love Punch was his final work as director. It was released following his death in May 2026.

== Personal life and death ==
Raj married Srividya, an HR professional, in 2001. After a corporate career of 16 years, Srividya quit to join her husband in television production. The couple had two children together: daughters Dhruti and Aditi, both of who have made television appearances.

During a visit to Goa in May 2026, Raj complained of chest discomfort and uneasiness. It was reported that might have had a heart ailment, and that he was planning on getting himself checked upon returning to Bengaluru. However, he suffered from a massive heart attack in the early hours of 13 May. He was rushed to a hospital in the city, but efforts to revive him failed and was pronounced dead. His last rites were held at his farmhouse near Gunnur, in Ramanagara taluk, as per Lingayat traditions, with family members and numerous film and television industry colleagues in attendance.

== Filmography ==
- All films are in Kannada, unless otherwise noted.

Year	Title	Role	Notes
2005	Nan Love Madtheeya	Kiran	
2005	Boyfriend	Shiva	
2006	7 O' Clock	Ajay	Guest appearance
2006	Autograph Please		
2006	Mukhamukhi		
2007	Sri Kshethra Kaivara Thathayya		
2007	Kshana Kshana	Ananth	
2007	Milana	Hemanth	
2008	Neene Neene		
2009	Love Guru	Abhi	
2009	Ninagaagi Kaadiruve		
2010	Police Quarters	Raju	
2010	Sugreeva		
2010	Kiladi Krishna	Anand	
2010	Sanchari		
2010	Gaana Bajaana	Kuttappa "Kuttu"	
2011	Bhramara		
2011	I Am Sorry Mathe Banni Preethsona		
2011	Manthana		
2011	Panchamrutha	Manohar	Segment Samarasave Jeevana: Harmonious life
2011	Aidondla Aidu	Kantha	
2012	Kiladi Kitty		
2012	Challenge	Kishore	Tri-lingual film (Kannada, Malayalam, Tamil)
2013	Lakshmi		
2013	Mahanadi		
2013	Auto Raja		
2013	Bhairavi		
2013	Tony		
2013	Barfi		
2014	Crazy Star		
2014	Nan Life Alli	Ramu	
2014	Mariyade		
2014	Darlinge Osina Darlinge		Telugu film
2015	Minchagi Nee Baralu		
2016	U Turn	Aditya	
2017	Marikondavaru		
2017	Sithara		
2018	Javaa		
2018	Ambi Ning Vayassaytho	Ambi's son	
2018	Kismath	Vinay	
2018	Neevu Kare Madida Chandadararu		
2018	Looty		
2019	Chitrakatha		
2019	Mahira	Kishore	
2023	Orchestra Mysuru	Naveen Raju	
2025	Nimma Vasthugalige Neeve Javaabdaararu	Albert	
2026	Love Mocktail 3	Sanjay	

As dubbing artist

- Srusti (2004)
- Olave (2005)
- Jogi (2005)
- Parichaya (2009)
- Aa Dinagalu (2007) for Chethan Kumar
- Anthu Inthu Preethi Banthu (2008) for Aditya Babu

== Television ==
Year	Title	Role	Notes
2004	Ardha Sathya		
2004	Mangalya		
2004	Kumkumabhagya	Vivek	
2005	Rangoli	Aadi	
2006	Preeti Illada Mele	Kishore	
2007	Malebillu	Aditya	
2007	Preetigaagi		
	Manetana		
2013	RathaSapthami	Jeevan	
2013	Purushottama	Purushottama	
2013	Amma Ninnagagi		
2016	Just Maath Maathalli		
2017	Majabharata S1		First non-fiction produced
	Janani		
2017	Vidya Vinayaka	—N/a	Producer
2018	Paaru	—N/a	Producer
2021–2024	Hitler Kalyana	Abhiram Jayshankar "AJ"	Producer
2024	Brahmagantu	—N/a	Director
2025	Vadhu	—N/a	Producer
2026	Krishna Rukku	—N/a	Director and producer
2026	Love Punch	—N/a	Micro-series
