= Orange (2018 film) =

2018 Indian Kannada-language romantic comedy film

- Directed by: Prashant Raj
- Screenplay by: Prashant Raj
- Produced by: Naveen G. S.
- Starring: Ganesh; Priya Anand
- Cinematography: Santhosh Rai Pathaje
- Edited by: Ravichandran. C
- Music by: S. Thaman
- Production company: Nimma Cinema
- Distributed by: Nimma Cinema
- Release date: 7 December 2018
- Running time: 140 minutes
- Country: India
- Language: Kannada

Orange is a 2018 Indian Kannada-language romantic comedy film directed by Prashant Raj and produced by Naveen starring Ganesh in the lead, making it a second collaboration after Zoom (2016), alongside Priya Anand. The supporting cast features Dev Gill, Sadhu Kokila, Ravishankar Gowda, Rangayana Raghu and Avinash among others. The music is scored by S. Thaman and cinematography is by Santhosh Rai Pathaje.

The film team has shot three songs and few montage scenes across several cities of the Europe continent. The film released across Karnataka on 7 December 2018. The film marks the first ever venture in Kannada cinema to have been acquired by the Amazon Prime prior to its release.

== Plot ==
Santhosh is a Robin Hood who gets released from prison and boards a train for his village. Santhosh meets Radha and become friends, where she tells him that she is in love with her boyfriend Prashanth, but her father Huli Veeraiah disapproves. Santhosh leaves the train to catch the thief who stole Radha's bracelet, but Radha misunderstands that Santhosh has reached his destination where she gives his bag and belongings and bid farewell.

Santhosh tries unsuccessfully to find her where he goes to Huli Veeraiah's house and the family lets Santhosh to stay at their house after they misunderstands him to be Radha's boyfriend. One day, Radha arrives back and the family fixes her marriage with Santhosh. In the village festival, Narasimha is a gangster and Huli Veeraiah's rival who tries to trouble Radha, but is saved by Santhosh. A comical events occur in the house as Prashanth and his family arrive.

Radha learns about Santhosh's identity and soon falls in love with him. One night, a group of thieves barge into Huli Veeraiah's house and steals necklaces from the house, where Santhosh becomes the suspect and is thrown out of the house. Narasimha starts to trouble Huli Veeraiah again at Radha's marriage, where he shows the captured Santhosh to instill fear in them.

However, Huli Veeraiah doesn't budge and insults Santhosh calling him as a thief, but Santhosh's grandmother intervenes and reveals that Santhosh was stealing money to run an orphanage and old-age home for the poor and depressed people. Santhosh wakes up and fights Narasimha, where he gets him arrested. Huli Veeraiah apologize to Santhosh and unites him with Radha, leaving Prashanth devastated.

== Cast ==
- Ganesh as Santhosh
- Priya Anand as Radha
- Dev Gill as Narasimha Nayaka
- Sadhu Kokila as Kodanda
- Rangayana Raghu as Giddappa
- Avinash as Huli Veeraiah
- Harish Raj as Prashanth, Giddappa's son
- Padmaja Rao as Radha's mother
- Meghana Khushi as Rukmini, Radha's sister
- Ravishankar Gowda as Rukmini's husband
- Sathyabhama as Gowramma, Radha's grandmother
- Srinivasa Gowda as V. Govind, a Police constable
- Vanishree as Dr. Sudha
- Girish Shivanna as Muniyyappa, a thief
- K. V. Manjayya as a priest
- Radha Ramachandra as Santosh's grandmother
- Prashant Raj in a cameo appearance as a fortune-teller

== Production ==
Terming the film a romcom with a "cute love story", director Prashant Raj stated that the film was named after the orange fruit because it "plays a major role in the film". He added that the protagonists in the film meet because of it. He added that Ganesh who plays the lead role in the film, plays a thief, while Sadhu Kokila plays a wrestler called Undertaker.

The film was Raj and Ganesh's second collaboration after Zoom (2016). Filming began in early February 2018 and later that month Priya Anand was signed to play the female lead opposite Ganesh. In July 2018, a ten-day schedule involving three songs and "montage scenes" were filmed in Europe.

== Soundtrack ==
Orange

Soundtrack album by S. Thaman
- Released: 25 October 2018
- Recorded: 2018
- Genre: Film soundtrack
- Length: 19:28
- Language: Kannada
- Label: Pallavi Audio
- Producer: S. Thaman

S. Thaman chronology
Kavacham (2018)	Orange (2018)	Mr. Majnu (2018)

Music composer S. Thaman was finalized to compose the songs for the film even though initially Joshua Sridhar was considered. Thaman had previously collaborated with Prashant Raj's previous venture Zoom (2016). A single track of the film was released first on 25 October 2018 online. The lyrics for the songs have been written by Kaviraj and Prashant Raj.

Tracklist
No.	Title	Lyrics	Singer(s)	Length
1.	"Orangeu Orangeu"	Kaviraj	Benny Dayal	3:54
2.	"Brotheru Brotheru"	Kaviraj	Kaala Bhairava	3:40
3.	"Yaaro Yaaro"	Kaviraj	Chinmayi	3:29
4.	"Sukumari My Sukumari"	Prashant Raj	Vijay Prakash, Sanjana Kalmanje	4:23
5.	"Orange theme"		Instrumental	1:09
Total length:				19:28

== Reception ==
S. M. Shashiprasad of Deccan Chronicle stated "Though predictable, the escapades of misplaced romantic scenario, runs swift without any delay which is another reason to grab this Orange filled with decent humour for the weekend."
