= List of television formats and genres =

The following is a list of television formats and genres.

== Formats ==
Television program formats:

- clip
- docufiction
- documentary
- single (one-time) episode
- made-for-TV film
- franchise
- miniseries
- micro-series
- Independent film
- mockumentary
- pilot
- prequel
- reboot
- remake
- revival
- segment
- sequel
- serial
- series
- short
- show
- special
- spin-off
- unaired episode/pilot
- Web series
- Webisode

Television program types:

- animated:
  - anime
  - computer animation (CGI)
  - stop-motion
  - traditional animation
- live-action
- models
- puppetry
- Live television
- Podcast

and combinations thereof.

== Genres ==
- Action series:
- (Adult content)
  - List of adult television channels: (Rated shows)
- Adventure series:
- Animated series: A television show which is traditionally, stop-motion or 2D or 3D computer animation.
  - Cartoon series:
- Anthology series:
- Art: shares some of the same traits of art films. Television shows such as David Lynch's Twin Peaks series and BBC's The Singing Detective also have "...a loosening of causality, a greater emphasis on psychological or anecdotal realism, violations of classical clarity of space and time, explicit authorial comment, and ambiguity."
- Children's series: A television show which is aimed at kids and/or children and/or families.
- Cooking show: A type of television show that presents food preparation in a kitchen studio set. Typically, the show's host, who is often a celebrity chef, prepares one or more dishes over the course of an episode. The chef takes the viewing audience through the food's inspiration, preparation, and stages of cooking.
- Daytime television:
- Dramatic programming:
  - Documentary: A documentary is a feature-length or near-feature-length film depicting a real-world event or person, told in a journalistic style (if told in a literary narrative style the result is often a docudrama). Examples: Hoop Dreams, The Thin Blue Line (documentary)
  - Docudrama: A program depicting some sort of historical or current news event, with specific changes or fabrications for legal, continuity or entertainment reasons. Depending on the quality of the feature and intended audience, these changes can minimally or completely change the story in relation to the actual events. These programs often depict crime or criminals but can also be used to depict heroics or tell a less-explored side of a well-known story. Example: United 93 (film) by Paul Greengrass depicts the events aboard United Airlines Flight 93 on September 11, 2001 via reconstruction from the available evidence. Since the specific words the passengers exchanged while planning their assault on the cockpit will never be known, the filmmakers created the dialogue based on research and evidence. The Onion Field is another example. This genre is often criticized for creating sensationalized programs intended to capitalize on public interest in lurid news stories; in the case of the Scott Peterson murder trial, a docudrama starring Dean Cain was filmed and aired during jury deliberations.
  - Dramality: a combination of television drama and reality television genres (e.g., the soap opera The Only Way Is Essex).
  - Dramedy
  - Courtroom drama
  - Medical drama: A medical drama is based around a team of medics helping patients who have been involved in accidents serious or otherwise. Most commonly, an accident occurs which results in the medics being called to help the injured. Most are usually based around a hospital, however, some are based around a mobile medical team etc. Examples of this genre are Casualty, Holby City and ER.
  - Mockumentary:
- Educational: A type of program that helps kids learn their basics to go through school.
- Factual television:
  - Instructional:
- Fantasy:
- Game show: A television show depicting a real contest, typically a trivia competition or physical challenge, with rewards in prizes or money. Examples: Let's Make a Deal, The Price Is Right, Family Feud, Wheel of Fortune and Jeopardy!. On other game shows, such as Match Game and Hollywood Squares, the players may include celebrities.
- Late-night television:
- Music television: A program where people can listen to music on their TV's. This is just like a radio station.
- News show: A television program depicting real, up-to-date events.
  - Current Affairs: Broadcast journalism where the emphasis is on detailed analysis and discussion of a news story.
  - Tabloid television:
- Police procedural: A television genre some say was pioneered by the popular show Dragnet. The stories revolve around a crime that has been committed and must be solved by the end of the episode following a very generic and usually unchanging structure of events. The crime is committed, witnesses are questioned, an arrest occurs, and then a judicial conclusion wraps it up. As the name implies, the show communicates everything "by the book," as it would happen in real life. In such modern police procedurals such as Law & Order, you see and hear even the officers reading freshly arrested criminals their Miranda rights. Not quite as dramatic or action-oriented as the Dick Tracy-style of detective shows.
  - Detective fiction:
- Prime-time television:
- Public affairs (broadcasting):
- Reality: A purportedly unscripted show (although evidence suggests some scripting or manipulation occurs) featuring non-actors interacting with each other or dealing with invented or contrived challenges, such as competing against others for a prize. Produced in a similar fashion as the documentary film genre, but with more emphasis on the showing of interpersonal conflict, emotional reactions, or unusual occurrences. The genre has numerous widely varying subgenres (see main article).
- Religious: A program produced by religious organizations, usually with a religious message. It can include church services, talk/variety shows, and dramatic movies. Within the last two decades, most religious programming is found on religious television networks.
- Science fiction:
- Serial: A television show which is one continuous story. Each episode picks up from where the last one left off. The story may shift with a new season.
- Comedy:
  - Sitcom: Short for Situational Comedy, a generally lighthearted genre which features characters having to deal with odd or uncomfortable situations or misunderstandings.
  - Romcom: Short for Romantic Comedy.
  - Stand-up comedy:
- Soap opera: A television show which is one continuous story. Usually on every day of the week instead of once a week. Can go on for over 20 years. Examples: All My Children, Days of Our Lives, The Young and the Restless, General Hospital, and Coronation Street
- Sports:
- Talk show:
- Telenovela: A television serial melodrama popular in Latin America. They are similar to a soap opera in miniseries format. They often feature Love and Drama, as well as other situations depending on the genre of telenovela. Examples include: Desire (TV series), Fashion House and Wicked Wicked Games.
- Infomercials:
- Variety show:
- Western Series:
  - Horse opera
  - Space Western:

== See also ==
- Lists of television programs
