= Gaana Bajaana =

2010 film by Prashant Raj

- Film poster
- Directed by: Prashant Raj
- Screenplay by: Prashant Raj
- Story by: Prashant Raj
- Produced by: Naveen
- Starring: Tarun Chandra; Radhika Pandit; Dileep Raj
- Cinematography: R. G. Shekar
- Edited by: Suresh Urs
- Music by: Joshua Sridhar
- Release date: 29 October 2010
- Running time: 120 minutes
- Country: India
- Language: Kannada

Gaana Bajaana is a 2010 Indian Kannada-language comedy film directed by Prashant Raj. It stars Tarun Chandra, Radhika Pandit, and Dileep Raj in the lead roles. The film includes music by Joshua Sridhar and camera work by Shekar. The film was produced by Naveen.

== Cast ==
- Tarun Chandra as Krish
- Radhika Pandit as Radhe
- Dileep Raj as Kuttappa ("Kuttu")
- Sharan
- C. R. Simha
- Raja Rao as Krish's grandfather
- R. G. Vijayasarathy
- Yashwant Sardeshpande

== Production ==
Prashant Raj cast three of the same actors from Love Guru in Gaana Bajaana as well. The movie was delayed for release because of scheduling conflicts with other movies released around the same time.

== Music ==
Track #	Song	Singer(s)	Duration
1	"Hosadondu Hesaridu"	Karthik, Shweta Mohan	
2	"Gaana Bajaana"	Joshua Sridhar, Sayanora Philip, Lady Kash and Krissy	
3	"Naanu Eega Naanena"	Karthik	
4	"Gundetu Gundetu"	Benny Dayal, Chinmayi	
5	"Aaja Nachre"	Sayanora Philip	
6	"Krish Intro"	Benny Dayal	

== Release and reception ==
The film was released on 29 October 2010.

=== Critical response ===
Shruti Indira Lakshminarayana of Rediff.com scored the film at 2 out of 5 stars and says "Radhika and Tarun do justice to their roles, but it is Dilip who comes out with the best performance. He gets his comic timing right too and lights up the screen. Well shot songs tuned to Joshua Shreedhar's music are the other highlights of the film. The songs are well backed by stylish and contemporary choreography". A critic from The New Indian Express wrote "Tharun and Dileep Raj have acted well. While Tharun is generous to showcase his semi-clad body, Dileep Raj is impressive with his dialogue delivery and dancing skills. Radhika Pandit walks away with all honours. Veteran actress Lakshmi Devi has provided good support. She deserves appreciation for accepting to play such a role in this movie". A critic from Deccan Herald wrote "Dileep, like in his previous outing, is pivotal to the plot and his tapori act is endearing. Joshua clearly has had a ball composing the score with cameraman Sekar joining in. This Gaana Bajaana rocks". A critic from Bangalore Mirror wrote "Joshua Sridhar's music, which remains 'inspired', is the highlight of the film. Shekar's camerawork allows Prashanth what he wanted, an avant-garde Kannada production. Take a break from the serious stuff and enjoy this film".
