= Dev Gill =

Indian film actor and model

- Born: Devinder Singh Gill; 12 October 1977 (age 49); Pune, Maharashtra, India
- Other name: Dev Singh Gill
- Occupations: Actor, model
- Years active: 2002–present
- Height: 5 ft 10 in (178 cm)
- Children: 2

Devinder Singh Gill is an Indian actor and model who predominantly works in Telugu, Hindi, Punjabi, Kannada and Tamil films.

== Career ==
Gill made his debut with film Shaheed-E-Azam (2002). In 2008, he acted in Telugu language film Krishnarjuna. In 2009 he appeared in Magadheera (2009), which received positive reviews from critics. He played the villain in the Tamil movie Sura (2010) starring Vijay. Gill played the role of an actor in Prema Kavali (2011). In 2013, he played the role of Pakistani athlete Abdul Khaliq in Bhaag Milkha Bhaag. In 2014, he worked in the Rajinikanth-starrer Lingaa. He played a lead role in Punjabi language film Saadey CM Saab (2016). Dev Gill was then back working in Kannada after a hiatus, roped in to play the antagonist in Orange (2018).

He plays the male lead in Telugu action film, Aho Vikramaarka (2024). Talking about his film's lead actor, Peta Trikoti stated, “Dev Gill is often associated with villanous roles, so we thought a lot about which genre would suit him as a hero”.

== Filmography ==
Key
†	Denotes films that have not yet been released

Year	Film	Role	Language
2002	Shaheed-E-Azam	Shivaram Rajguru	Hindi
2005	Mr Prime Minister	Al Qaida man	Hindi
2005	Bold	Raj	Hindi
2008	Krishnarjuna		Telugu
2009	Magadheera	Raghu Veer / Ranadev Billa	Telugu
2010	Sura	Samuthira Raja / Sundaram	Tamil
2010	Ragada	G. K.	Telugu
2011	Prema Kavali	Tagore	Telugu
2012	Poola Rangadu	Konda Reddy	Telugu
2012	Rachcha	Baireddanna's son	Telugu
2012	Sagar	Sonu	Kannada
2013	Naayak	Badvel	Telugu
2013	Adda	Deva	Telugu
2013	Election	Deviprasad	Kannada
2013	Bhaag Milkha Bhaag	Abdul Khaliq	Hindi
2014	Mr. Fraud	Nikki	Malayalam
2014	Lingaa	Freedom fighter	Tamil
2016	Saadey CM Saab	Dev Singh Gill	Punjabi
2016	Zoom		Kannada
2016	Sardaar Ji 2	Diljyot's fiancée	Punjabi
2017	Julie 2	Dubai Don Lala	Hindi
2018	Inttelligent	Patel	Telugu
2018	Genius	Satyajit Rathore	Hindi
2018	Orange	Narasimha Nayaka	Kannada
2019	Charlie Chaplin 2	Smuggler	Tamil
2019	Dabangg 3	Babloo	Hindi
2020	Khaki	Dev	Kannada
2021	Mirugaa	A. C. P. Vijay	Tamil
2021	Vakeel Saab	Shankar Reddy's Right Hand	Telugu
2022	Pakka Commercial	Ayub Khan	Telugu
2023	Pichaikkaran 2	Aravind	Tamil
2024	Aho Vikramaarka	Inspector Vikramaarka	Telugu
2026	Gharga		Kannada
2026	Sandakari	Matthew	Tamil
