= Valliddari Vayasu Padahare =

- Release poster
- Directed by: Bhanu Shankar
- Written by: Marudhuri Raja (dialogue)
- Screenplay by: Bhanu Shankar
- Story by: Bhanu Shankar
- Produced by: M. Kumara Swamy; Dr. Suresh Yallappa
- Starring: Tarun Chandra; Devaki
- Cinematography: Gaadiraju Srinivasa Rao
- Edited by: K. Ramgopal Reddy
- Music by: Kalyani Malik
- Production company: S. K. S. Creations
- Distributed by: Opal Vision
- Release date: 21 July 2006
- Running time: 153 minutes
- Country: India
- Language: Telugu

Valliddari Vayasu Padahare! (transl. Both of them are sixteen!) is a 2006 Indian Telugu-language romantic drama film directed by Bhanu Shankar and starring Tarun Chandra (in his only Telugu film to date) and newcomer Devaki with Jayasudha, Suhasini, Chandra Mohan and Raghuvaran in supporting roles. The film released after a two-year delay.

== Plot ==
The film follows two teenage lovers who have trouble succeeding in their love due to their respective families.

== Cast ==
- Tarun Chandra as Vamsee
- Devaki as Puja
- Jayasudha as Lakshmi Addala, Vamsee's mother
- Suhasini Maniratnam as Snehalatha, Puja's mother
- Raghuvaran as Shekhar, Vamsee's father
- Giri Babu as Rama Chandra Murthy
- Chandra Mohan as Chandram, Puja's father
- Venu Madhav as Arunachalam
- Telangana Sakunthala as History lecturer Shakunthala
- Brahmanandam as Ramakrishna
- Nutan Prasad as Marriage registration officer
- K. Viswanath as Judge (special appearance)
- Posani Krishna Murali as Lawyer (special appearance)
- Surya as Police inspector
- Narsing Yadav as Satti Reddy
- Uttej as Car driver
- Jenny as Store worker

== Production ==
The film is directed by P. Bhanu Shankar, who previously directed Evare Athagadu (2003). Tarun Chandra makes his solo lead debut with this film after playing one of the three leads in the Kannada film Khushi (2003). He was reported to be rebranded as Saketh (due to the presence of an actor of the same name). Vishakapatnam-based heroine Devaki was reported to be credited as Srilekha. The shooting was delayed due to Raghuvaran's ill health. The film was produced by M. Kumara Swamy, who previously produced two of G. Nageswara Reddy's youth films: 6 Teens (2001) and Girl Friend (2002). The film was ready for release in mid-November 2004.

The film reentered production for a song sequence choreographed by D. K. S. Babu in mid-2006. The film scheduled to release in July 2006.

== Soundtrack ==
Valliddari Vayasu Padahare

Soundtrack album by Kalyani Malik
- Released: 2006
- Recorded: 2004
- Genre: Feature film soundtrack
- Length: 25:01
- Language: Telugu

Official audio
- Valliddari Vayasu Padahare - Full Album on YouTube

All music is composed by Kalyani Malik.

Track listing
No.	Title	Lyrics	Singer(s)	Length
1.	"Abababba"	Veturi	Kalyani Malik, Mathangi	3:56
2.	"Kallalo Katuka"	Chandrabose	Sumangali	4:32
3.	"Dhoorama"	Veturi	M. M. Keeravani, Sumangali	4:56
4.	"Vale Poddullona"	Viswa	Raghu Kunche, Sahithi	4:47
5.	"Bayapadi"	Veturi	Kalyani Malik	4:22
6.	"Mathrudevo"	Umamahesh	Kalyani Malik	3:28
Total length:				25:01
