= Mahanadhi (disambiguation) =

The Mahanadi is a river in eastern India.

Mahanadhi or Mahanadi may also refer to:

- Mahanadhi (1994 film), Indian Tamil-language film
- Mahanadhi (TV series), 2023 Indian Tamil-language television series
- Mahanadi (2013 film), Indian Kannada-language film
- Mahanadi Shankar, Indian actor

== See also ==
- Mahanati, a 2018 Indian film by Nag Ashwin
