= Naanal =

Naanal (lit. 'Reed') may refer to these in Indian media:

- Naanal, a 1965 film
- Naanal, a 2008 TV series

== See also ==
- Naanalla, a 2011 Indian film
