= Ganda Hendathi =

- Directed by: Ravi Srivatsa
- Written by: Anurag Basu
- Based on: Murder (Hindi) by Anurag Basu
- Produced by: Shailendra Babu
- Starring: Vishal Hegde; Sanjjana; Thilak Shekar
- Cinematography: Mathew Rajan
- Edited by: Lakshman Reddy
- Music by: Gurukiran
- Production company: Sri Shailendra Productions
- Release date: 27 July 2006
- Running time: 142 minutes
- Country: India
- Language: Kannada

Ganda Hendathi (transl. Husband and wife) is a 2006 Indian Kannada-language erotic thriller film, directed by Ravi Srivatsa and produced by Shailendra Babu. The film stars newcomers Vishal Hegde, Sanjjana and Thilak Shekar

The film is a remake of Hindi film Murder (2004), starring Emraan Hashmi, Ashmit Patel and Mallika Sherawat. The film created huge controversies upon release for its excessive erotic scenes and content. The score and soundtrack was composed by Gurukiran for the lyrics of V. Manohar and Hrudaya Shiva.

== Cast ==
- Vishal Hegde as Susheel
- Sanjjana as Sanjana
- Tilak Shekar as Sachin
- Ravi Belagere
- Manju Bhashini
- Praveen
- Rachana Maurya as item number

== Soundtrack ==
The music was composed by Gurukiran with most of the songs (except "Don't Let Me") directly copied from the original compositions by Anu Malik.

#	Title	Singer(s)	Lyrics
1	"Oho Nasheyo"	Gurukiran	V. Manohar
2	"Nidiregu Raja"	Kunal Ganjawala	Hrudaya Shiva
3	"Don't Let Me"	Araadhana	Hrudaya Shiva
4	"Maathu Muride"	Kunal Ganjawala	V. Manohar
5	"Maathu Muride"	M. D. Pallavi Arun	V. Manohar

== Critical reception ==
The film received mixed reviews, being described as 'bold' by one reviewer but as 'rash and ridiculous' by another.
