= Prashant Raj =

Indian film director and screenwriter

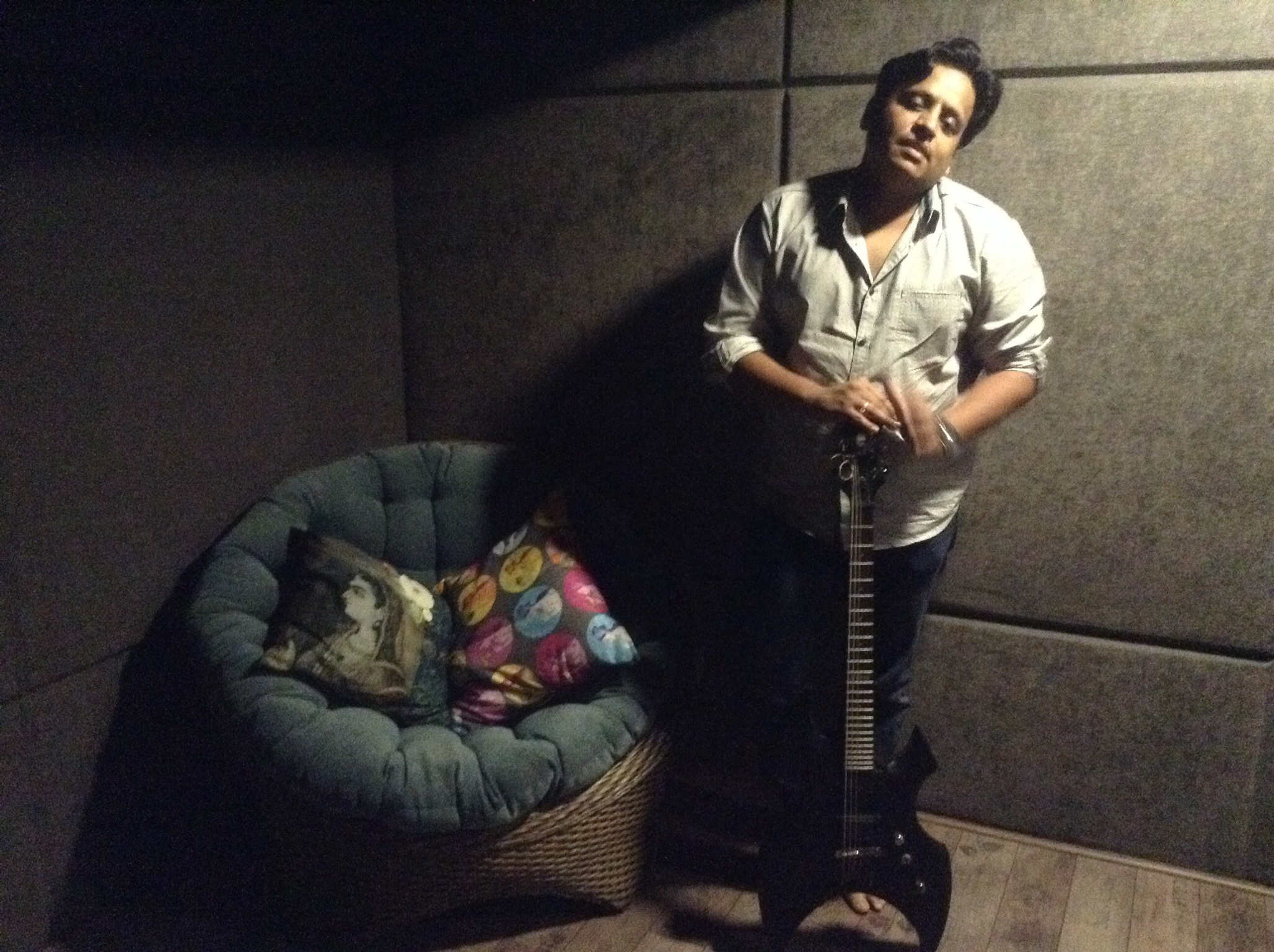
- Prashant Raj (on 2 July 2014)
- Born: 10 March 1982 (age 44); Bangalore, Karnataka, India
- Occupations: Director, screenwriter
- Years active: 2009 – present
- Spouse: Vandana
- Children: Vilok & Akarsh

Prashant Raj (born 10 March 1982 in Bangalore) is an Indian film director and screenwriter known for his work in Kannada cinema. He made his directorial debut with Love Guru in 2009.

== Filmography ==
- Note: all films are in Kannada, unless otherwise noted.

Year	Title	Notes	Ref.
2009	Love Guru		
2010	Gaana Bajaana		
2013	Whistle		
2016	Zoom		
2018	Dalapathi		
2018	Orange		
2023	Kick	Tamil film; remake of Zoom	

== Awards and nominations ==
Film	Award	Category	Result
Love Guru	57th Filmfare Awards South	Best Director	Nominated
Love Guru	Karnataka State award	Third Best Film	Won
