= Prem Kaa Game =

- Film poster
- Directed by: Ashok Kheny
- Written by: Abbas Hirapurwala
- Based on: Bisi Bisi by Ramanath Rugvedi
- Produced by: Ashok Kheny
- Starring: Arbaaz Khan; Tara Sharma; Madhuri Bhattacharya
- Narrated by: Salman Khan
- Cinematography: Sanjay V Malkar; Krishna Kumar
- Music by: Raju Singh
- Distributed by: A K K Entertainment Pvt. Ltd
- Release date: 26 February 2010
- Running time: 131 minutes
- Country: India
- Language: Hindi

Prem Kaa Game (transl. The game of love) is a 2010 Bollywood romantic comedy film produced and directed by Ashok Kheny and starring Arbaaz Khan, Tara Sharma, Madhuri Bhattacharya, Rakesh Bedi, Johnny Lever and Sameer Kochhar. Salman Khan appears in the film as a narrator. The film was released on 26 February 2010. It is a remake of the 2004 Kannada film Bisi Bisi, which itself was loosely based on the 1955 American film The Seven Year Itch.

== Plot ==
Prem has a life with his wife Sheetal and their daughter Pinky. Everything looks perfect until a model named Twinkle moves into the house next door. Prem starts feeling attracted to her charm and begins to feel emotions he did not expect. As his interest in Twinkle increases his relationship, with Sheetal begins to get worse. What starts as a moment of weakness slowly puts the happiness of the family at risk and changes the way Prem lives his life.

In his year of marriage Prem falls in love with another woman. Prem faces a decision about his future. Prem must consider his feelings for his wife and, for the woman before Prem decides how to move forward.

== Cast ==
- Salman Khan as Jaggu (narrator)
- Arbaaz Khan as Prem Sahni
- Tara Sharma as Sheetal Sahni
- Shriya Sharma as Pinky Sahni, Prem's daughter
- Madhuri Bhattacharya as Twinkle Chopra
- Malaika Arora as The Dream Girl
- Rakesh Bedi as Roop Chand Rathod
- Johnny Lever as Ramnik Chedda
- Razzak Khan as Lalwani
- Sameer Kochhar as Nikhil
- Vivek Shauq as Mishra
- Lilliput as Dr. Screwvala
- Gautam Shetty as Prem's Friend
- Zabyn Khan as Item Girl
- Al Hassan Milad

== Production ==
The film was initially known as Shaadi Ke After Effects, supposedly directed by Indrajit Lankesh.

== Soundtrack ==
The music of the film is composed by Raju Singh. It consisted of 7 songs with a total runtime of 33:12. The music was released on Junglee Music. Lyrics were written by Kiran Kotrial. A critic from The Times of India wrote that "Though at first ‘Prem Kaa Game’ would be an outright reject, but it can be heard once".

=== Track listing ===
No.	Title	Singer(s)	Length
1.	"Prem Ka Game"	Nishant Pandey	3:54
2.	"I Wanna Fall Fall in Love"	Sonu Nigam, Sunidhi Chauhan	5:01
3.	"Tum Hi Mere"	Javed Ali	4:47
4.	"Duniya Se Jo Chaaha"	Sunidhi Chauhan	5:08
5.	"Zabardast"	Sonu Nigam, Vishal Dadlani, Sunidhi Chauhan	5:11
6.	"Magar Kuch To Hai"	Sonu Nigam, Shreya Ghoshal	4:14
7.	"Khan Kaa Gyaan"	Salman Khan	4:57

== Release and reception ==
A critic from The Times of India wrote that "Confused. Unimaginative. Avoidable". The film was a box office failure.
