= Bisi Bisi =

- VCD cover
- Directed by: Ramanath Rugvedi
- Written by: Rajendra Karanth (dialogues)
- Screenplay by: Ramesh Aravind
- Story by: Pal Chandani
- Produced by: Pal Chandani
- Starring: Ramesh Aravind; Anu Prabhakar; Madhuri Bhattacharya
- Music by: Milind Dharmasena
- Production company: Ajay Films
- Release date: 8 January 2004
- Country: India
- Language: Kannada

Bisi Bisi (transl. Super hot) is a 2004 Indian Kannada-language comedy film directed by Ramanath Rugvedi and starring Ramesh Aravind, Anu Prabhakar and Madhuri Bhattacharya. The film was loosely based on the Hollywood film The Seven Year Itch (1955), and it was remade in Telugu as Adirindayya Chandram (2005) and Hindi as Prem Kaa Game (2010).

== Cast ==
- Ramesh Aravind
- Anu Prabhakar
- Madhuri Bhattacharya
- Shankar Rao
- Achyuth Kumar
- Rekha Das
- Aruna Balraj
- Kishori Ballal
- V. Manohar
- K. Praveen Nayak

== Production ==
The film was shot in twenty-seven days.

== Soundtrack ==
The music was composed by Milind Dharmasena. The music was released under the Anand Audio label.

Track listing
No.	Title	Singer(s)	Length
1.	"O Lovely Lady"	Uma Balu, Rohit M.	4:28
2.	"Bengloora Hudugira"	Hemanth	4:26
3.	"Hele Gelathi"	Shastri, Nanditha	4:27
4.	"Nanna Hendthi"	Hemanth, Rohit M., Ramesh	3:20
Total length:			16:41

== Reception ==
A critic from Deccan Herald wrote that "As the title itself suggests, this is an out and out comedy film. But, unlike others, it has a message". A critic from Viggy wrote that "In a nutshell, Bisi Bisi is a perfect entertainer for everyone. 100% paisa vasool! (transl. bang for your buck)". Sify wrote "Director Ramanath Rugvedi has to be credited for bringing out the pains of a married man who is caught in marriage which offers him nothing, and his need to bring in excitement in his life through an extra martial relationship. Yet again the director etches out the relationship between a husband and his wife".
