= Dalapathi (2018 film) =

2018 film directed by Prashant Raj

- Directed by: Prashant Raj
- Written by: M S Ramesh [dialogues]
- Screenplay by: Prashanth Raj
- Story by: Chandru
- Produced by: Naveen Raj
- Starring: Prem; Kriti Kharbanda.
- Cinematography: Santhosh Rai Pathaje
- Edited by: C Ravichandran
- Music by: Charan Raj
- Production companies: Nimma Cinima; Pride Films; Karma Bros
- Release date: 13 April 2018
- Country: India
- Language: Kannada

Dalapathi is a 2018 Indian Kannada language film written and directed by Prashant Raj. It stars Prem and Kriti Kharbanda.

== Cast ==
- Prem as Ram
- Kriti Kharbanda as Vaidhehi
- Sharath Lohitashwa as Adhipathi
- Chikkanna
- Padmaja Rao
- Krishi Thapanda
- Sanketh Kashi
- Srinivas Prabhu

== Soundtrack ==
The songs are composed by Charan Raj.

No.	Title	Lyrics	Singer(s)	Length
1.	"Early Morning"	Pavan Wadeyar	Vijay Prakash Eesha Suchi, Raksha	4:17
2.	"Gunu Gunuguva"	Kaviraj	Sanjith Hegde, Sinduri	3:56
3.	"Wah Re Wah"	Kaviraj	Vijay Prakash, Sinduri (Backing vocals: Sri Raksha Achar, Eesha Suchi Rachitha, Harsha Ranjini)	4:21
4.	"Yaarige Beku"	Prashant Raj	Sri Raksha Achar	2:55
5.	"Ishq Dishq"	Kaviraj	Chandan Shetty	3:50
6.	"Dalapthi Title Song"	Professor Krishne Gowda	Ananya Bhat (Backing vocals: Sri Raksha Achar, Eesha Suchi Rachitha, Harsha Ranjini)	3:50

== Reception ==
The Times of India gave 2.5 out of 5 stars praising the cinematographer and the dialogues and scenes in the film. Similarly, The New Indian Express gave 2.5 criticizing the climax and the flow.
