= Kick (2023 film) =

- Theatrical release poster
- Directed by: Prashant Raj
- Written by: Prashant Raj
- Produced by: Naveen Raj
- Starring: Santhanam; Tanya Hope
- Cinematography: Sudhakar S. Raj
- Edited by: Nagooran Ramachandran
- Music by: Arjun Janya
- Production company: Fortune Films
- Release date: 1 September 2023
- Running time: 124 minutes
- Country: India
- Language: Tamil

Kick is a 2023 Indian Tamil-language romantic comedy film written and directed by Prashant Raj. It is produced by Naveen Raj under the production banner Fortune Films. A remake of the director's Kannada film Zoom (2016) which itself is a remake of Lover Come Back (1961), the film stars Santhanam and Tanya Hope in the lead roles, Ragini Dwivedi, Brahmanandam, Mansoor Ali Khan, Senthil, Thambi Ramaiah, Kovai Sarala, and Manobala in supporting roles.

The film was announced in January 2022 under the tentative title Santa15, while the official title Kick was revealed in August. Principal photography commenced in April 2022, and wrapped in July. The music is composed by Arjun Janya, while the cinematography and editing are handled by Sudhakar S. Raj and Nagooran Ramachandran, respectively. The film was released theatrically on 1 September 2023 and received negative reviews from critics.

== Cast ==
- Santhanam as Santhosh
- Tanya Hope as Shivani
- Thambi Ramaiah as Michael Jackson "MJ"
- Brahmanandam as Scientist Vaali
- Senthil as Casio
- Kovai Sarala as Pushpa, Shivani's boss's sister
- Mansoor Ali Khan as Ganesh
- Manobala as Shivani's boss
- Sadhu Kokila as Judge
- Y. G. Mahendran as MJ's father
- Shakeela as Ad Council secretary
- Vaiyapuri as Ad Council chief
- Crane Manohar as Ad Council member
- King Kong as Shooting spot crew member
- Muthukaalai as Ganesh's PA
- Cool Suresh as Shooting spot crew member
- Madhan Bob as Businessman
- Anthony
- Ragini Dwivedi as Sheela (special appearance)
- Prashant Raj in a cameo appearance

== Production ==
=== Development ===
On 20 January 2022, Sandalwood director Prashant Raj, via Twitter, said that he was doing a Tamil film for the first time starring Santhanam in the lead role. He further said that the film was produced by Naveen Raj under Fortune Films. Tanya Hope, in March, announced her commitments to the film as the lead female role. A muhurat puja was held on 22 April in Chennai. On 31 August, coinciding with Ganesh Chaturthi, the official title Kick was revealed.

=== Filming ===
Principal photography commenced on 22 April 2022, with the first schedule in Bangalore. A song sequence was shot at the start of the schedule. The film was shot in Chennai, Bangkok and London before the principal photography wrapped in July.

== Music ==
Kick

Soundtrack album by Arjun Janya
- Released: 2022–2023
- Recorded: 2022–2023
- Genre: Film soundtrack
- Length: 10:21
- Language: Tamil
- Label: Saregama Music
- Producer: Arjun Janya

Arjun Janya chronology
| Love Birds (2022) | Kick (2023) | Rajamarthanda (2023) |

The music is composed by Arjun Janya, in his Tamil debut. The film marks his first collaboration with both Prashant and Santhanam.

- "Saturday is Cominguu" - Santhanam (lyrics by Viveka)
- "Kannamma" - Anthony Daasan (lyrics by Gana Bala)
- "Kick Theme" - Instrumental
- "Pathu Murai" - Armaan Malik, Saindhavi (lyrics by Vivek)
- "Gilma" - Jonita Gandhi, Arjun Janya (lyrics by Viveka)

== Release ==
=== Theatrical ===
Kick was released on 1 September 2023, clashing with Amitash's Paramporul, Samantha's Kushi and Hamaresh's Rangoli.

== Reception ==
A Srinivasa Ramanujam of The Hindu stated that "Santhanam’s film is yawn-inducing and terrible". Avinash Ramachandran of Cinema Express gave 1 star out of 5 and noted that "we see the cast and crew laughing their hearts out while filming Kick, one can’t help but think why didn’t these laughs translate onscreen, only to realise the actual joke was on us."
