= Madhuri Bhattacharya =

Indian actress and former model

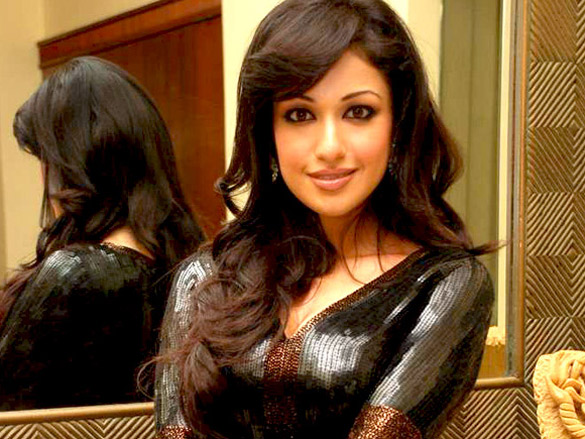
- Bhattacharya in 2010
- Born: Bangalore, Karnataka, India
- Occupations: Model, actress

Madhuri Bhattacharya is an Indian actress and former model who has appeared in Kannada and Hindi films.

== Early life ==
Born in Bangalore in a Bengali family, Bhattacharya studied at the Army Public School and later went to Mount Carmel College to study psychology and Ramaiah College to study law. She lived in R.T. Nagar, Bangalore along with her parents, before moving to Mumbai to pursue modelling. She won several beauty contests including the Miss Bangalore title before moving on to films. She is now married to a businessman Anurag Arya.

== Career ==
Bhattacharya started her film career by appearing in the Kannada films Khushi and Bisi Bisi. She also modelled for two videos of Sonu Nigam from his album Neene Bari Neene. She acted in Sahara One's television series Kuchh Love Kuchh Masti which was the Indian adaptation of the popular series Sex and the City. In 2009, she appeared in two Bollywood films, Bachelor Party and 3 Nights 4 Days. Her first full fledge role came in the 2010 comedy, Prem Kaa Game alongside Arbaaz Khan. In 2011, she featured in the popular item song "Tinku Jiya" alongside Dharmendra and Bobby Deol in the film Yamla Pagla Deewana. She has completed her third Kannada film Prasad, in which she plays the mother of a deaf-mute eight-year-old boy.

== Filmography ==
Year	Film	Role	Language	Notes
2003	Khushi	Simran	Kannada	
2004	Bisi Bisi		Kannada	
2009	Bachelor Party	Pooja	Hindi	
2009	3 Nights 4 Days	Zoha	Hindi	
2010	Prem Kaa Game	Twinkle Chopra	Hindi	
2011	Yamla Pagla Deewana	Item song "Tinku Jiya"	Hindi	
2011	Hero Hitler in Love	Item Song "Shabab"	Punjabi	
2012	Prasad	Malathi	Kannada	

== See also ==
- Unnati Davara
