= Ee Sanje =

- Directed by: Sree
- Written by: Sree
- Produced by: R Balaji Singh; L Manjunath; N Suresh; Shankar Reddy; P Suresh Hande
- Starring: Aarya; Sanjjana; Rangayana Raghu
- Cinematography: Shankar
- Edited by: K. Girish Kumar
- Music by: Jai Shiva
- Production company: Sri Sumukha Arts Creations
- Release date: 28 January 2011
- Running time: 134 minutes
- Country: India
- Language: Kannada

Ee Sanje (transl. This evening) is a 2011 Kannada-language romance film written and directed by Sree of Orata I Love You fame. It features newcomer Aarya and Sanjjana. The music is composed by Jai Shiva and cinematography is by Shankar.

== Plot ==
Sanjjana plays a dual character in Ee Sanje where the first half has some rural backdrop while the second half has the city life as backdrop. Aarya, a nephew of actor Sudeep, makes his debut.

== Cast ==
- Aarya as Arya
- Sanjjana as Anu
- Kishore as Balli
- Rangayana Raghu
- Sumithra
- Sathyajith
- Bank Janardhan
- Ninasam Ashwath
- Apoorva

== Soundtrack ==
Jai Shiva, born as J. Shivakumar (16 December 1982) composed the music for the film. At the age of 16, he started composing music and landed his first break through this film at the age of 21. Shiva learned classical/carnatic music from Shanmugham Master in Bangalore. The film featured seven songs composed by him and written by Hrudaya Shiva and Hemanth Das.

Popular singers such as Hemanth, Rajesh Krishnan, Tippu, Udit Narayan, Anuradha Sriram, S P Balasubramaniam, K.S. Chitra, Shankar Mahadevan and Jai Shiva sang the songs.

=== Track list ===
Song	Singer	Lyrics
"Abbababba"	Hemanth Kumar	Hrudaya Shiva
"Hangantheeya"	Udit Narayan, Anuradha Sriram	Ram
"Bide Bide"	Tippu, Raghu	Sree
"Bityaakode"	Rajesh Krishnan	Sree
"Nee Hetthu Hotthu"	Jai Shiva	Ram
"Eno Onthara"	S. P. Balasubrahmanyam, K. S. Chithra	Hemanth Das
"Hrudayaana Kelu"	Shankar Mahadevan	Srinivasa

== Reception ==
=== Critical response ===
A critic from The Times of India scored the film at 3 out of 5 stars and says "Rangayana Raghu has made a fool of himself by accepting such a stupid role. Music by Jaishivu and cinematography by Shankar are average". A critic from Bangalore Mirror wrote "The second half gets better, only slightly with the film delving into Arya’s background, his mother and the circumstances that led to his ire against the minister. There is also a strange terrorist group with a Muslim head and Sikh hitman and which targets corrupt politicians. Except for pleasing locales, nothing else in the film makes for a good watch". G S Kumar from Vijaya Karnataka wrote "Arya, though impressive, has to improve his dialogue delivery and expression. Sanjana fails to impress. Rangayana Raghu has made a fool of himself by accepting such a stupid role. Music by Jaishivu and cinematography by Shankar are average".
