= Sanjjana =

Indian actress

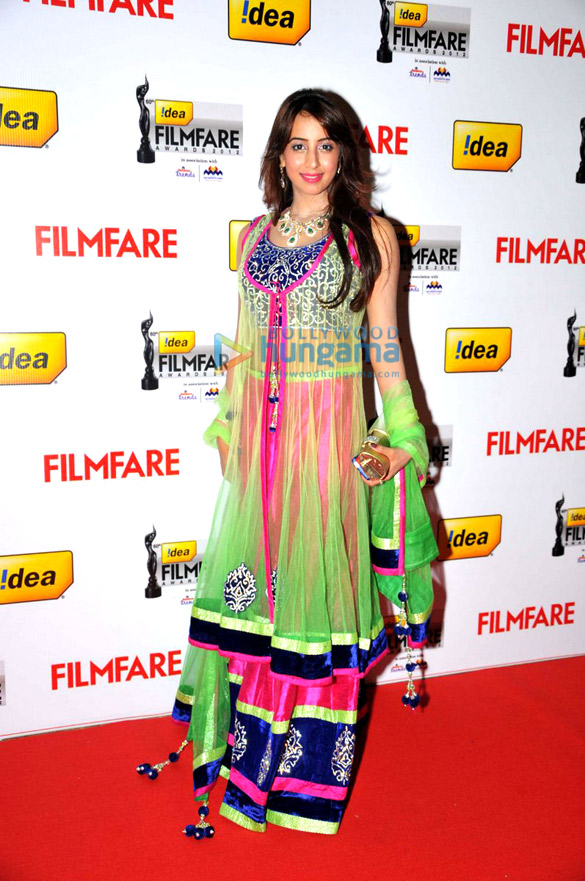
- Sanjjana in 2020
- Born: Archana Manohar Galrani; Bangalore, Karnataka, India
- Other name: Mahira
- Occupation: Actress
- Years active: 2005–present
- Spouse: Azeez Pasha (m. 2021)
- Children: 2
- Relatives: Nikki Galrani (sister); Aadhi Pinisetty (brother-in-law)

Archana Manohar Galrani (Mahira Pasha), known by her stage name as Sanjjana, is an Indian actress who predominantly works in Kannada and Telugu films. She made her film debut in the 2005 Telugu film Soggadu. She is known for her role in the Kannada film Ganda Hendathi (2006). She played a supporting role in the 2008 Telugu film Bujjigadu starring Prabhas. In 2017, she played Chandri in the Kannada crime drama Dandupalya 2. In 2025 she participated as a contestant in Telugu reality show Bigg Boss 9 and finished as 4th runner-up of the show.

== Early life ==
She was born as Archana Manohar Galrani in Bangalore and is the elder daughter of Manohar and Reshma Galrani who are of Sindhi ancestry. She has a younger sister, Nikki Galrani who is also an actress.

She appeared on a Fastrack advertisement with John Abraham.

== Career ==
After appearing in advertisements and as child artist in roles in the films Soggadu and Panduranga Vittala, she got her first starring role in Ganda Hendathi.

Her first release, however, was the Tamil feature film, Oru Kadhal Seiveer. S R Ashok Kumar of The Hindu noted that Galrani, then credited under her birth name, was "very beautiful but has to work on her acting".

Ganda Hendathi, a Kannada remake of the Hindi film Murder (2004), itself an adaptation of the Hollywood film Unfaithful (2002). The film was released in Telugu as Mogudu Pellam O Boy Friend. While Sify wrote, "Sanjjanaa has made a decent debut and she is extremely daring and does justice to her role".

In 2008, she made her official Telugu film debut in Puri Jagannadh's Bujjigadu, alongside Prabhas and Trisha. Although this was a supporting role, it gained her considerable attention and popularity. In 2010, she was seen in the Telugu film Police Police, which was followed by a cameo role in Huduga Hudugi. Her final release of that year was Mylari with Shivrajkumar, in which she played a journalist and was featured in a special song opposite Shivrajkumar. The film's success gained her offers in Kannada cinema. She won the Bangalore Times Award for Best Actor in a Negative Role Female in 2012 for I Am Sorry Mathe Banni Preethsona.

In January 2012, she played one of the lead roles in Casanova, her maiden Malayalam venture. Reportedly the costliest Malayalam production of all time, and co-starring Mohanlal and Shriya Saran, the film saw Galrani portray a salsa dancer. Director Rosshan Andrrews signed her for the particular role, since she was trained in salsa. Her last release is her second Malayalam film, the Shaji Kailas directed The King & the Commissioner, co-starring Mammooty and Suresh Gopi. Later in 2012 she appeared in films including Narasimha, Ondu Kshanadalli, Sagar, all of which being Kannada projects, and Yamaho Yama.

In 2013 she appeared in Jagan Nirdoshi in Telugu which was made under Padmalaya Films and in Mahanadhi in Kannada, which was her first heroine-centric film. She was then seen in Nenem…Chinna Pillana?.

== Controversy ==
=== Drug trafficking case ===
Galrani was arrested by the Central Crime Branch (CCB) of the Karnataka Police on 8 September 2020 in connection with the investigation into the Sandalwood drug racket case involving the Kannada film industry. She is the second actor to be arrested by the CCB after Ragini Dwivedi. Her bail application was denied several times by the courts, with the CCB claiming that she has admitted to being part of the drug racket. She was later granted bail after spending 3 months in prison. The drug case against Galrani and others was quashed by the Karnataka High Court on 25 March 2024 due to procedural lapses by the police.

== Personal life ==
Galrani converted to Islam and secretly married a Bangalore-based cardiovascular surgeon Azeez Pasha in February 2021. Together, they have two children: a boy (b. 2022) and a girl (b. 2025). She performed her first Umrah at Mecca in 2023. But according to her social media posts she is not a practicing Muslim. She often follows and perform other religious rituals and practices primarily Hinduism. In one of her Instagram posts, she expressed happiness in the Pranpratishtha ceremony of Ayodhya Ram Temple and added in her same post caption, "I hope my dream of a beautiful construction of a temple in Mathura for Krishna bhagwan also comes true in my lifetime of existence."

== Filmography ==
=== Film ===
List of film credits
Year	Title	Role	Language	Notes
2005	Soggadu	Anu	Telugu	Uncredited role
2006	Oru Kadhal Seiveer	Subha	Tamil	
2006	Ganda Hendathi	Sanjana	Kannada	
2006	Jackpot	Herself	Kannada	Cameo
2007	Autograph Please	Herself	Kannada	
2008	Arjun	Arjun's girlfriend	Kannada	
2008	Varasdhaara	Sanjana	Kannada	
2008	Bujjigadu	Kangana	Telugu	
2009	Satyameva Jeyathe	Sanjana	Telugu	
2009	Mast Maja Maadi	Herself	Kannada	Cameo
2009	Samardhudu	Nandhini	Telugu	
2010	Police Police	Sandhya	Telugu	
2010	Huduga Hudugi	Sachin's friend	Kannada	Special appearance
2010	Mylari	Swathi	Kannada	
2011	Ee Sanje	Anu	Kannada	
2011	Rangappa Hogbitna	Sneha	Kannada	
2011	Dushasana	Kajal	Telugu	
2011	I Am Sorry Mathe Banni Preethsona	Sinchana	Kannada	
2011	Take It Easy	Herself	Kannada	Cameo
2011	Mugguru	Yamini	Telugu	
2012	Ko Ko		Kannada	Special appearance
2012	Casanovva	Nidhi	Malayalam	
2012	The King & the Commissioner	Nitha Rathore	Malayalam	
2012	Narasimha	Rani	Kannada	
2012	Ondu Kshanadalli	Shilpa	Kannada	
2012	Sagar	Jenny	Kannada	
2012	Yamaho Yama	Nisha	Telugu	
2013	Mahanadi	Meenakshi	Kannada	
2013	Nenem…Chinna Pillana?		Telugu	
2013	Jagan Nirdoshi		Telugu	
2014	Love You Bangaram	Herself	Telugu	Special appearance
2014	Agraja	Herself	Kannada	
2015	Rebel	Laila	Kannada	
2015	Ram-Leela	Pooja	Kannada	
2015	Bangalore 560023	Swathi	Kannada	
2015	Ring Road		Kannada	
2015	Avunu 2	Sanjana	Telugu	
2016	Cinema My Darling		Kannada	
2016	Sardaar Gabbar Singh	Gayathri	Telugu	
2016	Just Akasmika	Aarohi	Kannada	
2016	Santheyalli Nintha Kabira	Sanjana	Kannada	
2016	Mandya to Mumbai		Kannada	
2017	Dandupalya 2	Chandri	Kannada	
2017	2 Countries	Tamannah	Telugu	
2018	Rajasimha	Sanju	Kannada	
2018	Dandupalya 3	Chandri	Kannada	
2022	Choran		Malayalam	
2024	Matthe Matthe		Kannada	
TBA	Kundara is My Country †		Malayalam	

=== Web series ===
- 2020 : Shit Happens (Telugu web series)
- 2019: Aivar (Tamil)

=== Television ===
- Sanjana was a contestant on Bigg Boss Kannada season 1,later eliminated on Day 14.
- Smart Show (Malayalam game show)
- Sixth Sense Kannada (Kannada game show)
- Sixth Sense (Telugu game show)
- Swarna Khadgam/Illayathalapathy as Queen Mahadatri. Produced by Arka Media Works and directed by Yata Satya Narayana.
- Galrani was a contestant of the Hindi reality TV show Mujhse Shaadi Karoge.
- Contestant in Bigg Boss (Telugu TV series) season 9, 5th runner-up.
- Ye Devi Varamo Neevu (Telugu TV soap opera)

== Awards ==
- Best Actor in a Negative Role Female for I Am Sorry Mathe Banni Preethsona – The Bangalore Times Film Awards 2011
- In 2015, she entered into the Limca Book of World Records by cycling for 104 hours.
- She was given the Celebrity Social Media Icon 2016 award by GMASA.
