= Kuchh Love Kuchh Masti =

- Written by: Rajesh Dubey
- Starring: see below
- Country of origin: India
- Original language: Hindi

Production
- Producer: Girish Mullick
- Running time: approx. 25 minutes

Original release
- Network: Sahara One
- Release: 22 November 2004

Kuchh Love Kuchh Masti (transl. Some love some fun) is an Indian television series aired on Sahara One channel. The story is about three young women living together share one problem-topsy-turvy love lives.

== Plot ==
The story portrays the lives of three women: Vartika, Neena and Pooja. They all have their own problems, Vartika is infatuated with a married man, Neena's involved with an older guy, and Puja can't choose between two guys.

== Cast ==
- Madhuri Bhattacharya as Pooja
- Sonika Anand as Vartika
- Sunaina Gulia as Neena
