= Ondu Kshanadalli =

- Film poster
- Directed by: Dinesh Babu
- Written by: Dinesh Babu
- Produced by: Jai Jagadish
- Starring: Tarun Chandra; Bhama Kurup; Sanjjana
- Cinematography: Suresh Byrasandra
- Edited by: B. S. Kemparaj
- Music by: Giridhar Diwan; Goutham Shrivastav
- Production company: JJ Productions
- Release date: 5 October 2012
- Country: India
- Language: Kannada

Ondu Kshanadalli (transl. In a moment) is a 2012 Indian Kannada-language romantic drama film written and directed by Dinesh Baboo starring Tarun Chandra, Sanjjana and Bhama Kurup in the lead roles. The film follows a young man (Chandra) who tries to escape an arranged marriage to his cousin (Sanjjana), only to become entangled in the life of a village girl (Kurup) after a misunderstanding changes both their lives.

Giridhar Diwan composed music for the film's soundtrack, while Goutham Shrivastav scored for the background. Jai Jagadish produced the film, who also appeared in a supporting role in it. The film made its theatrical release on 5 October 2012.

== Plot ==
Shyam returns home after spending five years in Delhi pursuing higher education. His parents, retired Colonel Rajendra and Vimala, are delighted by his return and soon begin making arrangements for his marriage with Shilpa, the daughter of Vimala's brother. However, Shyam feels he is too young for marriage and confides his concerns to his friend Seena, who runs a mobile repair shop and faces similar pressure from his grandfather to get married. Hoping to avoid the alliance, Shyam announces his plans to move to Chennai for another master's degree. To his frustration, Shilpa expresses her intention to join the same college to study fashion designing.

During a visit to a temple, Shyam notices Shilpa nearby and impulsively hugs an unknown girl named Divya in an attempt to convince Shilpa that he is already in love with someone else. Shocked by the incident, Shilpa postpones the wedding plans. However, the misunderstanding creates serious problems for Divya, a village girl from a conservative family whose marriage has already been arranged elsewhere. Mistaking Shyam for her lover, Divya's family publicly humiliates her, while villagers begin gossiping about the incident and accusing her of bringing shame upon the family. Determined to clear her name, Divya travels to the city to find Shyam and make him explain the misunderstanding to her parents. At the same time, Shyam also begins searching for Divya so that she can assure his family that she is not his girlfriend.

Divya eventually encounters Seena's grandfather, who begins speaking to her as a prospective bride for his grandson. Shyam and Seena meet her leading to the former joining Divya on her journey back to her village. During their trip, the bus they are travelling in plunges into a gorge, killing and injuring several passengers. Shyam and Divya help rescue and assist many of the victims until the police arrive. When they are taken to Divya's village, her father initially confronts Shyam, but the police praise the pair for their bravery and compassion during the accident. Shyam's parents and Seena also arrive at the village, where the misunderstanding surrounding Shyam and Divya gradually begins to resolve. Over time, Shyam realizes his feelings for Divya and confesses his love for her.

== Cast ==
- Tarun Chandra as Shyam
- Bhama Kurup as Divya
- Sanjjana as Shilpa
- Sharan as Seena
- Jai Jagadish as Rajendra
- Sathyajith as Divya's father
- Sadashiva Brahmavar as priest in temple
- M. S. Umesh as Seena's grandfather
- Shenoy
- Bhaskar as a cop
- Mithra as bus conductor
- Jaidev
- Manjunath Srirangapattana
- Natana Prashanth
- Shashikala
- Sangeetha as Vimala
- Sheela
- Uma

== Soundtrack ==
Ondu Kshanadalli

Soundtrack album by Giridhar Diwan
- Released: 15 March 2012
- Genre: Film soundtrack
- Length: 15:45
- Label: Anand Audio

Giridhar Diwan composed music for four tracks for the film's soundtrack. All the songs' lyrics are written by K. Ramnarayan. The audio was distributed by Anand Audio.

No.	Title	Singer(s)	Length
1.	"Ee Kshana"	Santhosh, Anuradha Bhat	3:59
2.	"Bisilethake"	Ajay Warriar, Anuradha Bhat	4:42
3.	"Mandarave Ninna"	Anuradha Bhat	4:06
4.	"Shloka"	Ajay Warriar, Divya Raghavan	1:58
Total length:			15:45

== Critical reception ==
A critic from The Times of India scored the film at three out of five stars and said "While Tharun Chandra is smart and superb, Sanjana and Bhama excel. But it's the Sharan-Umesh comedy track that clicks throughout the movie. The Jaijagadish-Sangeetha pair is brilliant. Music by Giridhar Divan has some catchy tunes. A movie for the family audience." Srikanth Srinivasa from Rediff.com gave a negative review, scored one-and-a half out of five, and called the film "unexciting and colourless". He wrote, Ondu Kshanadalli is a somewhat slow and tedious film with some very insipid narration." However, he commended the acting performances except for Tarun Chandra', and the music and camerawork on the film.
