= Nimma Vasthugalige Neeve Javaabdaararu =

Indian anthology crime drama film

- Theatrical release poster
- Directed by: Keshav Moorthy
- Written by: Keshav Moorthy
- Produced by: Magesh Ravindran; Kubendran
- Starring: Dileep Raj; Shilpa Manjunath; Apoorva Bharadwaj; Prasanna Shetty; Govind Madhusudhan; Hari Samashti
- Cinematography: Harsha Kumar Gowda
- Edited by: Kubendran
- Music by: Prasad K Shetty
- Production companies: Picture Shop; Native Craft
- Release date: 10 January 2025
- Country: India
- Language: Kannada

Nimma Vasthugalige Neeve Javaabdaararu (transl. You are responsible for your belongings) is a 2025 Indian Kannada-language anthology crime drama film directed by Keshav Moorthy starring Dileep Raj, Shilpa Manjunath, Apoorva Bharadwaj, Prasanna Shetty, Govind Madhusudhan and Hari Samashti. The film was released on 10 January 2025 to positive reviews.

== Plot ==
The film is an anthology crime drama set in modern-day Bengaluru, exploring human attachment to material possessions and the insecurities they conceal. The film unfolds through three distinct stories, each delving into characters whose vulnerabilities lead them into morally ambiguous territory.

=== Segment One: Inayath’s Obsession ===
The first story introduces Inayath (Prasanna V. Shetty), a water filter salesman grappling with Obsessive-Compulsive Disorder (OCD) and a strained interfaith marriage. His compulsive need for control manifests in an unusual obsession—stealing motorbikes. When his own prized bike goes missing, Inayath's fragile world spirals into chaos. His desperate attempts to reclaim it expose deeper emotional turmoil, turning petty theft into a metaphor for rebellion against societal expectations and personal loss.

=== Segment Two: Love Among Kleptomaniacs ===
The second narrative follows Rohith (Govind Madhusudhan) and Rathna (Apoorva Bharadwaj), two kleptomaniacs whose shared thrill for stealing sparks an unconventional romance. Initially portrayed as harmless fun, their escapades soon blur the line between playful indulgence and compulsive addiction. As their bond deepens, the couple's petty thefts escalate, forcing them to confront the consequences of their unchecked impulses. This segment, vibrant and mischievous, gradually darkens, offering a commentary on desire and obsession.

=== Segment Three: The Honey Trap ===
The final story shifts to a tense, noir-inspired drama featuring Albert (Dileep Raj), a politically connected operator, and Jennifer (Shilpa Manjunath), his accomplice. Together, they orchestrate a honey trap targeting a wealthy man suspected of hoarding black money. What begins as a calculated scheme soon spirals into betrayal and suspense, culminating in a gripping climax that exposes greed and manipulation at their rawest. This chapter, steeped in deception, contrasts sharply with the earlier segments’ lighter tone, delivering a chilling finale.

=== Themes and Tone ===
Across its three stories, the film examines how materialism intertwines with emotional fragility, revealing characters who are not hardened criminals but ordinary people succumbing to moments of weakness. The anthology oscillates between humor, romance, and thriller elements, ultimately offering a nuanced reflection on identity, desire, and the weight of possessions.

== Cast ==
First segment	Second segment	Third segment
Prasanna Shetty as Inayaat	Apoorva Bharadwaj as Rathna; Govind Madhusudhan as Rohit	Dileep Raj as Albert; Shilpa Manjunath as Jennifer "Jenny"; Hari Samashti as Sanketh Purohith; Vamshi Krishna; Lakshmi Srinivas Murthy as Albert's accomplice

== Production ==
The film was shot in 90 days.

== Music ==
Prasad K Shetty composed the score for the film, with audio rights going to PRK Audio. The lyrics were written by the director Keshav Murthy.

Track listing
No.	Title	Lyrics	Singer(s)	Length
1.	"Middle Class"	Keshav Murthy	Vidya Prakash	4:23
2.	"Sadhaa"	Keshav Murthy	Padmaja Srinivasan	5:01
3.	"Hungamaa"	Keshav Murthy	Siddharth Belmannu	5:03
4.	"Gaayab"	Keshav Murthy	Naveen Sajju	4:23
5.	"Ekanthave"	Keshav Murthy	Vijay Prakash	4:40

== Reception ==
Pranati A S of Deccan Herald rated the film 3.5/5 and praised the actors, music and cinematography. Sridevi S of The Times of India rated the film 3.5/5 and wrote, "Authentic performances, with content that is brand new, at least for the Kannada audience, Nimma Vasthugalige Neeve Javaabdaararu makes for a good theatre outing, especially for the thrilling second half". A Sharadhaa of The New Indian Express rated the film 3.5/5 and wrote, "The film’s pacing, though unhurried, allows viewers to immerse themselves in its offbeat rhythm and savour the simple, human moments that reveal complex truths about identity and belonging".

Y. Maheswara Reddy of Bangalore Mirror rated the film 3/5 stars and concluded that "[y]oungesters will enjoy this film". Swaroop Kodur of The News Minute wrote that "Nimma Vasthugalige Neeve Javaabdaararu is a rare anthology that is inventive, cheeky, and feather-light in its approach. It gets most things right and a few wrongs, but its delectable spread of characters and amusing situations make up for those occasional glitches".
