= Goa (2015 film) =

- Film poster
- Directed by: Surya
- Written by: Venkat Prabhu
- Screenplay by: Surya
- Based on: Goa by Venkat Prabhu
- Produced by: Shankar Gowda; Shankar Reddy; Rajath Manjunath
- Starring: Komal Kumar; Tarun Chandra; Srikanth; Sharmila Mandre; Rachel Wise
- Cinematography: Rajesh Katta
- Edited by: Deepu S. Kumar
- Music by: Arjun Janya
- Production company: Shankar Productions
- Distributed by: M. N. Kumar
- Release date: 6 March 2015
- Running time: 131 minutes
- Country: India
- Language: Kannada

Goa is a 2015 Indian Kannada romantic comedy film directed by Surya. It stars Komal Kumar, Tarun Chandra, Srikanth, Sharmila Mandre, Sonu and British theatre artiste Rachel Wise in lead roles. The film is an official remake of the Tamil film of the same title (2010) directed by Venkat Prabhu. The film features the music composed by Arjun Janya whilst the cinematography is by Rajesh Katta.

== Cast ==
- Komal Kumar as Swamy
- Tarun Chandra as Ramaraja
- Srikanth as Surya
- Sharmila Mandre
- Sonu
- Rachel Wise as Rachel
- Ashok
- Ramesh Bhat
- Bullet Prakash
- Shobaraj
- Dharma
- Shankar Gowda as Police officer
- Nayantara as the new village girl (cameo appearance - reused footage from Goa)

== Production ==
Initially titled as Punyathmaru, the director rechristened the film title to be same as that of the original version during the launch of the film. The filming took place at a brisk pace in and around Goa and parts of Karnataka such as Bangalore, Mysore and Srirangapatna.

== Soundtrack ==
Goa

Soundtrack album by Arjun Janya
- Released: 2014
- Genre: Feature film soundtrack
- Label: Anand Audio

Arjun Janya composed the film's background score and music for its soundtrack. The album consists of four tracks, the lyrics for which were penned by Naveen, Hemanth, K. Kalyan and Chandan Shetty.

No.	Title	Lyrics	Singer(s)	Length
1.	"My Name is Komal"	Naveen	Koushik Harsha, Sangeetha
2.	"Nin Mukha Nodi Bittu"	Hemanth	Arjun Janya, Sangeetha
3.	"Shuruvayithu"	K. Kalyan	Shashank Sheshagiri, Archana Ravi
4.	"Galagante"	Chandan Shetty	Chandan Shetty

== Reception ==
=== Critical response ===
A critic from The Times of India rated the film two out of five stars and wrote that "This Kannada version of Tamil movie Goa offers nothing extra ordinary. Sharmiela Mandre steals the show with a graceful performance. Sonu Gowda is good. The performance of Komal, Tarun and Sriki fail to lift the spirit. Arjun Janya offers some foot-tapping songs. Rajesh’s camera work is good". A critic from Vijaya Karnataka gave the film the same rating and wrote that "Of the three, Komal's acting can be given the highest marks. The acting of Sriki, Tarun, Sharmila Mandre also attracts attention. Shobharaj and Ramesh Bhatt have done their given role smartly. However, the film's story, dialogue, narration, making, sequence of scenes etc. are inadequate. So it will be difficult to see Goa on screen".
