= Tarun Chandra =

Indian actor

Tarun Chandra / Taarun Chandrra
- Born: 27 April 1983 (age 43); Bangalore, Karnataka, India
- Occupation: Actor
- Years active: 2003–present

Tarun Chandra is an Indian actor who works in Kannada films. He made his film debut in the multi-starrer Khushi (2003) and has since then acted in various films, notably, Geleya (2007), Parichaya (2008), Love Guru (2009) Gaana Bajaana (2010).

== Early life and career ==
Taarun was born in Bangalore. He graduated with a bachelor of commerce degree from MES College, Bangalore. He underwent three months acting course at Kishore Namit Kapoor Acting Institute, before he entered into films. He first appeared as one of the lead actors in 2003 released film, Khushi. He had also acted in a Telugu film Valliddari Vayasu Padahare which was released in 2006 after a two-year delay. After Geleya's successful run, he was approached for Parichaya and by director Prashant for his movie Love Guru, which won a state award for best movie. His last film appearance came in the Kannada film Goa. In November 2021, he signed the paranormal thriller film, Trin Trin. Directed by Anand Mishra, he is to star alongside Diganth.

== Filmography ==
Year	Film	Role	Notes
2003	Khushi	Ajay	
2006	Valliddari Vayasu Padahare	Vamsee	Telugu film
2007	Geleya	Vishwa	
2007	Ee Bandhana	Kapil	
2008	Hani Hani	Rahul	
2009	Love Guru	Pratham	
2009	Parichaya	Jayanth	
2009	Seena	Seena	
2010	Gaana Bajaana	Krish	
2011	Naanalla	Siddharth	
2011	Achchu Mechchu	Vijay	
2012	Addhuri	Tarun	Cameo appearance
2012	Ondu Kshanadalli	Shyam	
2012	Snehitaru		
2013	Padhe Padhe	Sunny	
2014	Gharshane	Himself	Special appearance
2015	Goa	Ramaraja	
