= Mahanadi (2013 film) =

- Theatrical release poster
- Directed by: Krishnappa Uppuru
- Written by: Krishnappa Uppuru
- Produced by: Glenn Dias; Jerry Vincent Dias
- Starring: Sanjjana; Dileep Raj; Suryakiran
- Cinematography: Sundarnath Suvarna
- Edited by: Srinivas P Babu
- Music by: A M Neel
- Production company: J J Productions
- Release date: 14 June 2013
- Country: India
- Language: Kannada

Mahanadi is a 2013 Indian Kannada-language directed by Krishnappa Uppuru. Sanjjana, Dileep Raj and Suryakiran in lead role, story of the film is written by Krishnappa Uppuru and produce by Jerry Vincent Dias and Glane Dias. It was theatrically released on 14 June 2013.

== Cast ==
- Sanjjana as Minakshi
- Dileep Raj as Raj
- Suryakiran as Janna
- Rangayana Raghu
- Loknath
- Shobaraj
- Venkadri
- Padmini Prakash
- Malathi Sardeshpande
- Varshini
- Mini
- Rakesh
- Dharmendra
- Gururaja Hoskote

== Production ==
In May 2012, principal photography took place in Keni Village in Ankola. Filming was completed on 20 July 2012.

== Soundtrack ==
Mahanadi

Soundtrack album by A. M. Neel
- Released: 2013
- Recorded: 2013
- Genre: Feature film soundtrack
- Length: 24:17
- Language: Kannada

Official audio
- Mahanadi- Full Album on YouTube

No.	Title	Artist(s)	Length
1.	"Thara Thara"	Ritisha and Sarthak	4:44
2.	"Hoove Hoove"	Kailash Kher	6:03
3.	"Ambarada Anchali"	Kushala and Mohan	5:01
4.	"Kadalugala Giri"	Shreya Ghoshal	4:16
5.	"Gaavore Nachore"	Chaitra H. G.	4:13
Total length:			24:17

== Reception ==
=== Critical response ===
A reviewer of Deccan Herald wrote "The rest of the cast is one long parade and actors like Muni are wasted in inconsequential roles. This Mahanadi is nothing but a monsoon-fed stream". Hari from Kannada Prabha says "Rangayana Raghu has won the numbers game in spades. Loknath is the support of Mahanadi as an elder grandfather. But, Kashi, Shobharaj's talents are not properly utilized. The question should also be asked whether an actor like Satyajith was needed for a scene". Charan C.S from The Times of India wrote "The performance of Rangayana Raghu, who plays the role of gambler Ningappa, falls flat. The other characters, played by Malathi Sardeshpande, Loknath, Shobharaj and Satyajit are also average". Savitri Av from Vijaya Karnataka wrote "Rangayana Raghu brings color to some situations. Thara Thara Hosa Thara...Song is like life to a movie. The situations in Mumbai are closer to reality. It is reassuring not to over-glorify any situation".
