= Naanalla =

- Official poster
- Directed by: Dinesh Baboo
- Written by: Dinesh Baboo
- Produced by: D. B. Kumaraswamy
- Starring: Tarun Chandra; Shubha Poonja; Anant Nag
- Cinematography: Suresh Bhairasandra
- Edited by: Sanjeeva Reddy
- Music by: Giridhar Diwan
- Production company: Sri Gowthami Enterprises
- Release date: 21 October 2011
- Country: India
- Language: Kannada

Naanalla (transl. Not me) is a 2011 Indian Kannada-language murder mystery film directed by Dinesh Baboo and starring Tarun Chandra, Shubha Poonja and Ananth Nag. The film is inspired by the Hindi film Deewangee (2002), which itself was based on the English film Primal Fear (1996).

== Cast ==
- Tarun Chandra as Siddharth
- Shubha Poonja as Bhavya
- Anant Nag as Subhash Chandra Prasad
- Kushboo as Subhash Chandra Prasad's wife
- Rangayana Raghu as Prathap
- Sihi Kahi Chandru as Melmane
- Mukhyamantri Chandru as lawyer

== Production ==
Tarun Chandra took a break from his romantic films with this thriller film.

== Reception ==
A critic from The Times of India wrote that "Director Dinesh Baboo has done a marvelous job with the script. He’s set an example of how best a thriller can be made without spoiling the story — a rarity in Kannada cinema". A critic from the IANS wrote that "It is an engaging tale with a brilliant narration coupled with finely tuned performances". A critic from Bangalore Mirror wrote that the film "is an engrossing watch for all kinds of audience".
