= Khushi (2003 Kannada film) =

- CD cover
- Directed by: Prakash
- Written by: Prakash
- Produced by: Jayamma
- Starring: Vijay Raghavendra; Tarun Chandra; Harish Prabhath; Sindhu Menon; Madhuri Bhattacharya; Chaitra Hallikeri
- Cinematography: Mathew Rajan
- Edited by: S. Manohar
- Music by: Gurukiran
- Production company: Sri Jaimatha Combines
- Release date: 2 October 2003
- Running time: 151 mins
- Country: India
- Language: Kannada

Khushi (transl. Happiness) is a 2003 Indian Kannada romance film directed by the debutant film maker Prakash and starring Vijay Raghavendra, Tarun Chandra, Harish Prabhath and Sindhu Menon in the lead roles along with Ananth Nag, Madhuri Bhattacharya, Chaitra Hallikeri and Avinash in other prominent roles. The score and soundtrack was by Gurukiran. The film was a box office success and ran for fifty days.

== Cast ==
- Anant Nag as Rajendra Prasad
- Vijay Raghavendra as Vijay
- Tarun Chandra as Ajay
- Harish Prabhath as Shashank
- Sindhu Menon as Chaya
- Madhuri Bhattacharya as Simran
- Chaitra Hallikeri as Priyanka
- Avinash as Durga Prasad
- Chitra Shenoy
- Ravindranath
- Poornachandra Tejaswi
- Vishal Hegde
- M. S. Umesh
- Mandeep Roy
- Dwarakish
- Sihi Kahi Chandru
- Ramesh Bhat
- Kishori Ballal as Ajji
- Jean as Priyanka's friend
- Ruthika as herself (Special Dance Number - "Kalla Chandamama")

== Production ==
The film is about millennials and their attitudes, but also covers the older generation. This film marks the debut of Tarun Chandra, Madhuri Bhattacharya and Harish Prabhath, brother of Hema Prabhath, after his first film Olave (2005) had a delayed release. Debina Bonnerjee was supposed to play one of the lead roles but was replaced by Sindhu Menon.

== Soundtrack ==
The music was composed by Gurukiran.

Khushi

Soundtrack album by Gurukiran
- Released: 2003
- Genre: Feature film soundtrack
- Label: Ashwini Audio

Track #	Song	Singer(s)	Lyrics
1	"Nammappa Nimmappa"	Hemanth Kumar, Gurukiran, Shankar Shanbag	V. Nagendra Prasad
2	"Khullam Khulla"	Gurukiran, Sandhya	V. Nagendra Prasad
3	"Kamala Kamala"	Sumathi, Gurukiran	V. Nagendra Prasad
4	"Dinavella Hasivilla"	Srinivas, K. S. Chithra	V. Nagendra Prasad
5	"We Will Do It"	Hemanth Kumar	V. Nagendra Prasad
6	"Kalla Chandamama"	Malgudi Subha	V. Nagendra Prasad

== Reception ==
A critic from Chitraloka wrote, "Debutant director Prakash gives much more than the concept he holds in a two and half film. He is diligent in all areas of this film and it does not appear that he is wielding the megaphone for the first time" and concluded, "It is a colorful film made sensibly".
