= Parichaya =

- Directed by: K Sanjay
- Produced by: S G Krishna Murthy
- Starring: Tarun Chandra; Rekha
- Cinematography: P K H Das
- Edited by: K M Prakash
- Music by: Jassie Gift
- Production company: S G K Productions
- Release date: 6 November 2009
- Country: India
- Language: Kannada

Parichaya is a 2009 Indian Kannada-language film directed by K Sanjay and Produced by S G Krishna Murthy starring Tarun Chandra and Rekha in the lead roles. The movie is loosely inspired by the 2001 movie Serendipity.

== Cast ==
- Tarun Chandra as Jayanth
- Rekha as Nirmala "Nimmi"
- Sindhu Lokanath
- Shally Khatri
- Avinash Yelandur
- Shobaraj
- Anand
- Sanketh Kashi as Nirmala's father
- Chidanand
- Bhargavi Narayan
- Sudha Belawadi as Girija
- M. Aravind
- Unni
- Aryabhata
- Pushpa Swamy
- Monisha
- Varnitha
- Karibasavaiah as gift shop owner

== Music ==
The music was composed by Jassie Gift.

Parichaya

Soundtrack album by Jassie Gift
- Released: October 2009
- Recorded: 2009
- Genre: Feature film soundtrack
- Length: 27:26
- Language: Kannada

Official audio
- Parichaya - Full Album on YouTube

Track listing
| No. | Title | Singer(s) | Length |
|---|---|---|---|
| 1. | "Jeo Jeenedo" | Baba Sehgal, Jassie Gift | 4:36 |
| 2. | "Nadedaaduva Kaamanabillu" | KK, Rajalakshmi | 5:21 |
| 3. | "Jigi Jigi Jigidu" | Alisha Chinai, Blaaze, Jassie Gift | 4:22 |
| 4. | "Kudinotave Manamohaka" | Shaan, Shreya Goshal | 4:05 |
| 5. | "O Nanna Olave" | Kailash Kher | 5:46 |
| 6. | "Kudinotave Manamohaka" | Shaan | 4:05 |
| Total length: | | | 27:26 |

== Reception ==
=== Critical response ===
R. G. Vijayasarathy of Rediff.com scored the film at 2 out of 5 stars and says "Tarun is good in songs and dances but is expressionless in the emotional scenes. The dubbing work done by actor Dileep Raj does not suit his body language. Rekha should never weep like this in any film! Her new look is attractive, but she is still to attain a maturity in her performance. Avinash and Shobharaj provide some relief with their dialogues particularly Avinash who imitates a well known film director. Other artists are just passable". A critic from Deccan Herald wrote "A dragged out climax and the Kailash Kher song do mar the pleasure but chartbuster numbers shot well, dialogue and artwork that know today’s youths’ pulse all deserve a pat on the back. ‘Parichaya’ is one film worth knowing". A critic from Bangalore Mirror wrote "The first half of the film runs like a breeze. A trimmer second half would have taken Parichaya a notch higher. Tarun’s acting is not up to the standard of Dilip Raj who has dubbed for him. Parichaya is still worth getting acquainted with".
