= Joshua Sridhar =

Indian film composer and music director (born 1974)

- Born: Sridhar; 9 March 1974 (age 52)
- Genres: Film score, Film soundtrack
- Occupations: Film composer, Music director
- Instruments: Synthesizer, Electronic Keyboard, Vocal
- Years active: 2004 to present

Joshua Sridhar (born 1974 in Chennai, India) is an Indian composer known for his work in Tamil and Kannada films. He made his debut with the film Kaadhal.

== Early life and education ==
Joshua Sridhar was born in Chennai on 9 March 1974 to Saravanan and Rajalakshmi. He studied at Bharatiya Vidya Bhavan's Rajaji Vidyashram in Chennai from 1980 to 1990. After finishing High School he studied Western Classical Music for two years. He studied 8 Grades (Trinity College, London) in both Theory of Music and Piano. In 1993 he converted to Christianity and was baptised at Emmanuel Methodist Church (Chennai) and was given the name Joshua, the biblical character from the old testament. Not wanting to remove the name he was given at the time of birth he kept the name Sridhar and came to be known as Joshua Sridhar.

== Career ==
Joshua Sridhar began his career in the year 1993 composing, arranging and programming music for gospel albums and jingles. In the year 1996, he entered Indian cinema. He worked as a keyboard player/programmer for many Indian film composers (notably Manisharma & A.R.Rahman) between 1996 and 2004. In 2004 made his film debut as composer of Kaadhal. The film was released on 8 December 2004.

== Filmography ==
Year	Language				Notes
Year	Tamil	Kannada	Telugu	Malayalam	Notes
2004	Kaadhal		Premisthe		Nominated for Filmfare Awards – Tamil
2005	Abhayam		Danger		
2006	Uyir		Manohara		
2006	Chennai Kadhal		Prema		
2006	Aran			Keerthi Chakra	Won SICA Award for best Music Director – Malayalam
2006			Game		
2007		Arasu			
2007	Ninaithu Ninaithu Parthen		Prema		
2007	Kalloori		Kalasala		
2009		Love Guru			Nominated for Filmfare Awards — Kannada
2010		Gaana Bajaana			Nominated for Filmfare Awards — Kannada
2010		Huduga Hudugi			
2010		Devadas			
2011	Appavi				
2011	Veppam		Sega		Nominated for SIIMA Awards – Tamil
2011	Vithagan				
2011	Yuvan		Keratam		
2012	Acham Thavir		Genius		
2013		Whistle			
2013		Googly			Nominated for Filmfare Awards — Kannada
2014		Huchudugaru			
2015	Pulan Visaranai 2				
2015	Vellaiya Irukiravan Poi Solla Maatan				
2016	54321				
2016	Parandhu Sella Vaa				25th Film
2017		Rajahamsa			
2018	Oru Kuppai Kathai				
2019	July Kaatril				
2019		Yaana #			

Notes:

- The films are listed in order that the music released, regardless of the dates the film released.
- The year next to the title of the affected films indicates the release year of the either dubbed or remade version in the named language later than the original version.
- ♦ indicates a remade version, the remaining ones being dubbed versions.
- # indicates that the film score is by another composer.
