= Zoom (2016 Kannada film) =

2015 film by Prashant Raj

- Directed by: Prashant Raj
- Written by: Prashant Raj
- Based on: Lover Come Back by Stanley Shapiro and Paul Henning
- Produced by: Naveen; Hari Prasad
- Starring: Ganesh; Radhika Pandit
- Cinematography: Santhosh Rai Pathaje
- Edited by: C. Ravichandran
- Music by: S. Thaman
- Production companies: Nimma Cinema; Pride Films
- Distributed by: Nimma Cinema
- Release date: 1 July 2016
- Running time: 149 minutes
- Country: India
- Language: Kannada

Zoom is a 2016 Indian Kannada-language romantic comedy film directed by Prashant Raj starring Ganesh and Radhika Pandit in the lead roles. The supporting cast features Sadhu Kokila and Kashinath. The music is scored by S. Thaman and cinematography is by Santhosh Rai Pathaje. The film released on 1 July 2016 across Karnataka to mixed reviews. The movie is a remake of 1961 movie Lover Come Back. The director remade the movie in Tamil in 2023 as Kick.

== Cast ==
- Ganesh as Santhosh
- Radhika Pandit as Nayana
- Sadhu Kokila as M. Janakiram "MJ"
- Kashinath as Dhoomakethu
- Srinivas Prabhu as Nayana's boss
- R. N. Sudarshan
- Kavya Shetty as Santhosh's colleague
- M. S. Umesh
- Ravishankar Gowda as Casio
- Bank Janardhan as Litterer
- Jaya as Naina

== Soundtrack ==
Zoom

Soundtrack album by S. Thaman
- Released: 25 March 2016
- Recorded: 2016
- Genre: Film soundtrack
- Length: 19:28
- Language: Kannada
- Label: Pallavi Audio
- Producer: S. Thaman

S. Thaman chronology
Aarathu Sinam (2016)	Zoom (2016)	Sarrainodu (2016)

The music was composed by S. Thaman.

Tracklist
No.	Title	Lyrics	Singer(s)	Length
1.	"Raja Di Raja"	Prashant Raj	Puneeth Rajkumar	3:53
2.	"Kunniyuva"	Kaviraj	Deepak	4:45
3.	"Naina"	Kaviraj	Megha	3:38
4.	"Pistol Bawa"	Kaviraj	Sanjana, Nivas	3:35
5.	"Hey Diwana"	Pawan Wadeyar	Srimurali, Radhika Pandit	3:36
Total length:				19:28

== Release ==
This was the first Kannada movie to be reportedly dubbed in three foreign languages namely French, Korean and Malay. It also became the first Kannada film to be certified by the British Board of Film Classification.

== Reception ==
A critic from The Times of India rated the film two-and-a-half out of five stars and wrote that "The lead actors give the film their best, but the extended screenplay that shifts focus between the fun cat and mouse game between the lead pair leaves one wishing the film was shorter". A critic from The New Indian Express wrote that "With very limited characters, the film is highly recommended for those who just want to laugh out loud". A critic from Bangalore Mirror wrote that "If you can bear the length, Zoom is for time pass. Beware of whom you watch it with". A critic from The Hindu wrote that "There are films that expect you to leave your brains at home and then there is Zoom, in a category of its own. And that is not necessarily a good thing".
