= Micro-series =

Brief episodic programming on television

A micro-series (also microseries) is an extremely short episodic television programming narrative sponsored by an advertiser. This is a non-traditional way of reaching primary markets. A micro-series is intended to promote a product while engaging viewers with entertaining content. A micro-series is often only a season in length, and episodes are generally two to three minutes long, often playing during commercial breaks of popular television programs. After each air date, they are also available online and on mobile devices.

== Popular micro-series ==
Even if it doesn't have a large audience, a micro-series creates buzz, especially if it is interactive, as in the case of CBS's 2006 micro-series, The Courier. Sometimes a spin-off micro-series is created from a popular TV show, for example, NBC's prime-time hit, Heroes. In November 2008, Sprint Nextel sponsored a four-episode micro-series called Heroes: Destiny on mobile, online, and television. Each five- to seven-minute episode debuted on Monday nights. The micro-series featured Sprint's Instint phone in some scenes in what David Lang, head of MindShare Entertainment, calls "subtle integration." Sprint ads also aired adjacent to the on-air promotions.

It is important that the micro-series content fits the environment or theme of the program in which it airs. A good example of this is TBS's micro-series Commuter Confidential. In 2008, TBS debuted a two-minute episode of Commuter Confidential featuring Revlon products and Match.com, during Sex and the City. The micro-series plot line mirrors the comedy of the HBO produced Sex and the City. Confidential features four female characters and their diverse ways of dealing with the world around them.

With the advent of the digital video recording (DVR), advertisers are trying to create brand messages that defeat the fast-forward button. General Motors is sponsoring a five-part micro-series, My Manny on Turner Broadcasting's TBS, to highlight the features on its new Traverse Crossover vehicle. It airs during the original series Tyler Perry's House of Payne.

The television series, My Manny, achieved notable success and has since been renewed for a third season. General Motors, in light of this achievement, decided to sponsor a new series, Gillian in Georgia. This program was broadcast on TBS during the spring of 2010, featuring Jill Marie Jones, recognized for her role in Girlfriends. The show's storyline revolves around a trendy New Yorker who relocates to the South to reside with her sister's family. Gillian in Georgia is among the lineup of TBS' popular sitcom Meet the Browns.

Unilever, too has gotten into the micro-series action. Singer Alicia Keys was selected by Dove and MTV to star in their "real beauty" micro-series called Fresh Takes. The series revolves around a group of twenty-something females and the pressures they must overcome in order to pursue their dreams. Each miniseries aired as a commercial interstitial during the March 24, 2008 premiere of The Hills. The micro-series is intended to promote the new Dove products while confronting issues of self-esteem.

Sometimes a micro-series may turn into a half-hour television sitcom, as in the case of In the Motherhood, a series of online shorts about moms coping with their chaotic lives – with help from Spring Nextel services and Suave hair care products. This micro-series just got picked up for the midseason lineup on ABC. It will anchor a new comedy block on Thursdays, one of the most competitive nights of TV.
