= Love Guru (2009 film) =

- Film poster
- Directed by: Prashant Raj
- Written by: Prashanth Raj
- Produced by: Naveen
- Starring: Tarun Chandra; Radhika Pandit; Dileep Raj
- Cinematography: Gnanamurthy
- Edited by: Suresh Urs
- Music by: Joshua Sridhar
- Production company: Nimma Cinema
- Release date: 17 July 2009
- Running time: 135 minutes
- Country: India
- Language: Kannada

Love Guru (Kannada: ಲವ್ ಗುರು) is a 2009 Indian Kannada film directed by Prashant Raj. The film starred Tarun Chandra and Radhika Pandit in leading roles. The music of the film was composed by Joshua Sridhar.

== Plot ==
Kushi (Radhika Pandit), Pratham (Tarun) and Sharan attend an interview where all the 3 are selected. Pratham starts loving Kushi and proposes her but everyone thinks he was trying to fool her as it was 1 April. Later she marries her boss Abhi (Dilip Raj) not knowing that Pratham is in love with her. At her wedding reception, Pratham gives her a rose and announces in front of all that he loves her. But Kushi and Abhi ignore the incident as they think that he wants to give a shock to them.. But he continues to pine for Kushi, and, finally, quits his job much to Kushi's dismay. When another woman enters his life, the heart-broken Pratham decides to start life afresh.

== Cast ==
- Tarun Chandra as Pratham
- Radhika Pandit as Kushi
- Yagna Shetty
- Dileep Raj as Abhi
- Sharan
- Srinivasa Murthy
- Harish Raj
- Jai Jagadish
- Ramesh Bhat
- Chitra Shenoy
- Aindrita Ray (Cameo Appearance)
- Shille Manjunath as Kushi's younger brother

== Music ==
No.	Title	Singer(s)	Length
1.	"Romeogalige Juliet"	Benny Dayal, Blaaze	03:15
2.	"Ondondu Storigu"	Krish, Harini	04:49
3.	"Minchi Hoithu"	Benny Dayal, Vijayaa Shanker	03:20
4.	"Thangaali Thandeya"	Benny Dayal	04:40
5.	"Yaaru Kooda"	Karthik, Benny Dayal	05:12
6.	"Hudugaata Aadi"	Karthik	05:26
Total length:			20:50

== Reception ==
=== Critical response ===
R G Vijayasarathy of Rediff.com scored the film at 3.5 out of 5 stars and says "All the actors have performed well. This is certainly Tarun's best performance till date. Radhika Pandit is one of the best actresses to appear on the marquee in the recent times. She breathes life into Kushi. Veteran artists Jai Jagadish, Sreenivasa Murthy, Ramesh Bhat, Chitra Shenoy are also perfect in their roles. But the comedy sequences do not gel with the mood of film. Even if you find the climax offbeat, you will enjoy the film. Love Guru is certainly a different kind of film, worth watching". A critic from The New Indian Express wrote ""Yaaru Kooda Ninna Haage" and "Thangaali Tandeya" are well picturised. Cameraman Saba Kumar has done a wonderful job with the songs. The camera work captures the sequences quite effectively. The art work is fine and matches the film's background. "Love Guru" is a must watch for its freshness, though the story is not off beat". B S Srivani from Deccan Herald wrote "Radhika's smartness is evident in her choice of roles. Yajna Shetty and Harish Raj are wasted. Jnanamurthy's camera and the graphics guys are diligent; Joshua presents pleasing, yet eerily familiar tunes. What lingers from the film is the director's hesitation which finally turns into conviction. Inexperience in some departments is somewhat compensated by his overall design". A critic from The Times of India scored the film at 3 out of 5 stars and says "Radhika Pandit steals the show with her brilliant expressions, lively action and excellent dialogue delivery. Tarun and Dilip Raj are impressive. Sharan's comedy is a treat to watch. Joshuva Sridhar's music is good. Gnanamurthy's camerawork is commendable".
