= 1987–88 Karnataka State Film Awards =

Annual Indian film awards ceremony

The Karnataka State Film Awards 1987–88, presented by Government of Karnataka, recognised the best of Kannada Cinema releases in the year 1987.

== Lifetime achievement award ==
Name of Award	Awardee(s)	Awarded As
• Puttanna Kanagal Award	• G. V. Iyer	• Director

== Film awards ==
Name of Award	Film	Producer	Director
First Best Film	Aasphota	V. Verghese	T. S. Nagabharana
Second Best Film	Avasthe	• Esther Ananthamurthy • Mahima Patel • Krishna Masadi	Krishna Masadi
Third Best Film	Kadina Benki	Manasa Arts	Suresh Heblikar

== Other awards ==
Name of Award	Film	Awardee(s)
Best Direction	Aasphota	T. S. Nagabharana
Best Actor	Avasthe	Anant Nag
Best Actress	Shivayogi Akkamahadevi	Usha
Best Supporting Actor	Aasphota	H. G. Dattatreya
Best Supporting Actress	Mana Mechchida Hudugi	Papamma
Best Child Actor	Dange	Jayanth
Best Music Direction	Pushpaka Vimana	L. Vaidyanathan
Best Cinematography	Shivayogi Akkamahadevi	N. Chandra
Best Editing	Pushpaka Vimana	D. Vasu
Best Sound Recording	Elu Suttina Kote	Srinivas
Best Story Writer	Aasphota	P. N. Rangan
Best Screenplay	Aasphota	T. S. Nagabharana
Best Dialogue Writer	Avasthe	• U. R. Ananthamurthy • Krishna Masadi
Jury's Special Award	Pushpaka Vimana	Singeetam Srinivasa Rao (For Film)
Jury's Special Award	Kaadina Benki	B. R. Chaya (As Best Female Playback Singer)
Jury's Special Award	Kendada Male	Puttur Narasimha Nayak (As Best Male Playback Singer)
