= 2011 Karnataka State Film Awards =

Annual Indian film awards ceremony

The Karnataka State Film Awards 2011, presented by the Government of Karnataka, honoured the best of Kannada Cinema releases in the year 2011.

== Lifetime achievement award ==
Name of Award	Awardee(s)	Awarded As
• Dr. Rajkumar Award • Puttanna Kanagal Award • Dr. Vishnuvardhan Award	• Hamsalekha • D. Rajendra Babu • Anant Nag	• Music Director, Lyricist • Director • Actor

== Jury ==
A committee headed by Sunil Kumar Desai was appointed to evaluate the feature films awards.

== Film awards ==
Name of Award	Film	Producer	Director
First Best Film	Prasad	Ashok Kheny	Manoj K. Sathi
Second Best Film	Koormavatara	• Amrutha Patil • Basant Kumar Patil	Girish Kasaravalli
Third Best Film	Allide Nammane Illi Bande Summane	Roopa Sourav	Gopi Peenya
Best Film Of Social Concern	Sarasammana Samaadhi	• Amrutha Patil • Basant Kumar Patil	K. N. T. Sastry
Best Children Film	Kamsale Kaisale	• Mahesh Nanjaiah • Nagini Bharana	T. S. Nagabharana
Best Regional Film	Ujwadu (Konkani language)	• K. J. Dhananjaya • Anuradha	Kasaragod Chinna
Best Entertaining Film	Saarathi	K. V. Sathya Prakash	Dinakar S. Thoogudeep
Best Debut Film Of Newcomer Director	Sidlingu	T. P. Siddaraju	Vijaya Prasad

== Other awards ==
Name of Award	Film	Awardee(s)
Best Direction	Prasad	Manoj K. Sathi
Best Actor	Prasad	Arjun Sarja
Best Actress	Bhageerathi	Bhavana
Best Supporting Actor	Kamsale Kaisale	Shridhar
Best Supporting Actress	Sidlingu	Girija Lokesh
Best Child Actor	Prasad	Sankalp
Best Child Actress	Bannada Kode	Suhasini
Best Music Direction	Sidlingu	Anoop Seelin
Best Male Playback Singer	Ball Pen ("Saavira Kiranava Chelli")	Adithya Rao
Best Female Playback Singer	Bhageerathi ("Beru Ondu Kade")	Archana Udupa
Best Cinematography	Koormavatara	G. S. Bhaskar
Best Editing	Allide Nammane Illi Bande Summane	B. S. Kemparaju
Best Lyrics	Bhageerathi (All Songs)	Baraguru Ramachandrappa
Best Art Direction	Saarathi	Eshwari Kumar
Best Story Writer	Koormavatara	Kum. Veerabhadrappa
Best Screenplay	I Am Sorry Mathe Banni Preethsona	Ravindra H. P. Das
Best Dialogue Writer	Allide Nammane Illi Bande Summane	Gopi Peenya
Jury's Special Award	Saarathi	Rajan (For Special Graphic Effects)
