= 2001–02 Karnataka State Film Awards =

Annual Indian film awards ceremony

- Date: 20 January 2003
- Location: Dr. B. R. Ambedkar Bhavan, Bengaluru
- Country: India
- Presented by: S. M. Krishna (Chief Minister of Karnataka)

The 2001–02 Karnataka State Film Awards were presented by Government of Karnataka, honouring the best of Kannada Cinema released in the year 2001. The award ceremony was held on 20 January 2003.

== Lifetime achievement award ==
Name of Award	Awardee(s)	Awarded As
• Dr. Rajkumar Award • Puttanna Kanagal Award • Lifetime Contribution to Kannada Cinema Award	• Prathima Devi Shankar Singh • M. S. Rajashekar • Rajanand	• Actress • Director • Supporting Actor

== Jury ==
A committee headed by U. S. Vadiraj was appointed to evaluate the feature films awards.

== Film awards ==
Name of Award	Film	Producer	Director
First Best Film	Dweepa	Soundarya	Girish Kasaravalli
Second Best Film	Ekangi	V. Ravichandran	V. Ravichandran
Third Best Film	Neela	Drushti Srushti Films	T. S. Nagabharana
Best Film Of Social Concern	Gandhada Gombe	B. Srinivas	• M. D. Hasham • B. Shankar
Best Children Film	Putti	Medajit Creations	B. R Keshav

== Other awards ==
Name of Award	Film	Awardee(s)
Best Direction	Dweepa	Girish Kasaravalli
Best Actor	Ekangi	V. Ravichandran
Best Actress	Dweepa	Soundarya
Best Supporting Actor	Parva	Keremane Shambhu Hegde
Best Supporting Actress	Kalla Police	M. N. Lakshmi Devi
Best Child Actor	Yuddha Mattu Swatantrya	Vijay
Best Child Actress	Putti	Deepu
Best Music Direction	Ekangi	V. Ravichandran
Best Male Playback Singer	Ekangi ("Hudugi Super")	Rajesh Krishnan
Best Female Playback Singer	Gandhada Gombe ("Bili Bannada Gili")	Nanditha
Best Cinematography	Dweepa	H. M. Ramachandra
Best Editing	Kambalahalli	Shyam
Best Lyrics	Sri Manjunatha ("Obbane Obbane Manjunathanobbane")	Hamsalekha
Best Sound Recording	Ekangi	L. Sathish Kumar
Best Art Direction	Sri Manjunatha	Arun Sagar
Best Story Writer	Kambalahalli	Munirathna
Best Screenplay	Kothigalu Saar Kothigalu	• S. V. Rajendra Singh Babu • Ramani
Best Dialogue Writer	Dharma Devathe	Thaadoor Keshava
Jury's Special Award	Neelambari (For Technology Incorporation)	Prakash
