= 2005–06 Karnataka State Film Awards =

Annual Indian film awards ceremony

The Karnataka State Film Awards 2005–06, presented by the Government of Karnataka, recognised the best Kannada-language films released in the year 2005.

== Lifetime achievement award ==
Name of Award	Awardee(s)	Awarded As
• Dr. Rajkumar Award • Puttanna Kanagal Award • Lifetime Contribution to Kannada Cinema Award	• Jayanthi • V. Ravichandran • S. Ramachandra	• Actress • Actor, Director • Cinematographer

== Jury ==
A committee headed by T. N. Seetharam was appointed to evaluate the feature films awards.

== Film awards ==
Name of Award	Film	Producer	Director
First Best Film	Naayi Neralu	• Abhishek Patil • Basant Kumar Patil	Girish Kasaravalli
Second Best Film	Nenapirali	Ajay R. Gowda rao	Ratnaja
Third Best Film	Amrithadhare	• Niveditha Venkatesh • Rajashree Ramesh • Nagathihalli Chandrashekar	Nagathihalli Chandrashekar
Best Film Of Social Concern	Thaayi	Prameela Joshai	Baraguru Ramachandrappa
Best Children Film	Thutturi	Jaimala Ramachandra	P. Sheshadri
Best Regional Film	Kadala Mage (Tulu language)		

== Other awards ==
Name of Award	Film	Awardee(s)
Best Direction	Naayi Neralu	Girish Kasaravalli
Best Actor	Jogi	Shiva Rajkumar
Best Actress	Naayi Neralu	Pavitra Lokesh
Best Supporting Actor	Mata	Jaggesh
Best Supporting Actress	Jogi	Arundhati Nag
Best Child Actor	Care Of Footpath	Kishan
Best Music Direction	Nenapirali	Hamsalekha
Best Male Playback Singer	Shubham ("Aha Yuvarani")	C. Ashwath
Best Female Playback Singer	Amrithadhare ("Huduga Huduga")	Chaitra H. G.
Best Cinematography	Nenapirali	H. M. Ramachandra
Best Editing	Aakash	S. Manohar
Best Lyrics	Thaayi ("Barutheve Naav Barutheve")	Baraguru Ramachandrappa
Best Sound Recording	Amrithadhare	Johnson
Best Art Direction	Aham Premasmi	• Ismail • Shivakumar
Best Story Writer	Miss California	C. N. Muktha
Best Screenplay	Jogi	Prem
Best Dialogue Writer	Mukha Mukhi	• Lakshmipathi Kolar • Sudarshan
Best Male Dubbing Artist	Dr. B. R. Ambedkar	Ravindranth
Best Female Dubbing Artist	Nenapirali	Amrutha Singh
Jury's Special Award	Dr. B. R. Ambedkar	Producer & Director: B. J. Vishnukanth (For Film)
Jury's Special Award	Care Of Footpath	Producer: Shylaja Shrikanth; Director: Kishan (For Film)
