= 2013 Karnataka State Film Awards =

Indian awards

The Karnataka State Film Awards 2013, presented by the Government of Karnataka, recognised the best of Kannada-language films released in the year 2013.

== Lifetime achievement award ==
Name of Award	Awardee(s)	Awarded As
• Dr. Rajkumar Award • Puttanna Kanagal Award • Dr. Vishnuvardhan Award	• Srinath • P. H. Vishwanath • K. V. Gupta	• Actor • Director • Producer, Distributor

== Jury ==
A committee headed by G. K. Govinda Rao was appointed to evaluate the awards.

== Film awards ==
Name of Award	Film	Producer	Director
First Best Film	Hajj	Rajiv Kothari Tallur	Nikhil Manjoo
Second Best Film	Jatta	N. S. Rajkumar	B. M. Giriraj
Third Best Film	Prakruti	Panchakshari	Panchakshari
Best Film Of Social Concern	Ingale Marga	Vaishnodevi Creations	Vishal Raj
Best Children Film	Haadu Hakki Haadu	Gurubala Entertainers	Nagendra Shah
Best Regional Film	Rickshaw Driver (Tulu language)	Mutthu Films	H. S. Rajashekar
Best Entertaining Film	Charminar	Sri Siddeshwara Enterprises	R. Chandru
Best Debut Film of Newcomer Director	Agasi Parlour	Anu Creations	Mahantesh Ramadurga

== Other awards ==
Name of Award	Film	Awardee(s)
Best Director	Hajj	Nikhil Manjoo
Best Actor	Hajj	Nikhil Manjoo
Best Actress	December-1	Nivedhitha
Best Supporting Actor	Matte Satyagraha	Sharath Lohitashwa
Best Supporting Actress	Agasi Parlour	Bhageerathi Bai Kadam
Best Child Actor	Kariya Kanbitta	Pradyumna
Best Child Actress	Athi Aparoopa	Shreya
Best Music Direction	Lucia	Poornachandra Tejaswi
Best Male Playback Singer	Lucia ("Edeyolagina Tama Tama Tamate")	Naveen Sajju
Best Female Playback Singer	Kaddipudi ("Hedarabyadree Antha")	Sachina Heggar
Best Cinematography	Chandra	P. K. H. Das
Best Editing	Tony	K. M. Prakash
Best Lyrics	Madarangi ("Male Haniye Kanneeru")	Arasu Anthare
Best Art Direction	Bhajarangi	Ravi Santhehakkalu
Best Story Writer	Hajj	Srilalithe
Best Screenplay	Tony	Jayatheertha
Best Dialogue Writer	Myna	Nagashekar
