= 2016 Karnataka State Film Awards =

Annual Indian film awards ceremony

- Date: 24 April 2017
- Location: Dr. B. R. Ambedkar Bhavan; Vasanth Nagar, Bengaluru
- Country: India
- Presented by: Siddaramaiah (Chief Minister of Karnataka)
- Most wins: Jeerjimbe (4)

The 2016 Karnataka State Film Awards, presented by the Government of Karnataka, recognised the best of Karnataka cinema films released in the year 2016. The list of winners were announced on 11 April 2017. The awards were presented on 24 April.

== Lifetime achievement award ==
The jury committee for selecting the lifetime achievement awards was headed by actress Jayanthi.

Name of Award	Awardee(s)	Awarded As	Awards
• Dr. Rajkumar Award • Puttanna Kanagal Award • Dr. Vishnuvardhan Award	• Advani Lakshmi Devi • K. V. Raju • K. Chinnappa	• Actress • Director • Poster artist	• ₹ 2,00,000 & Gold Medal with a certificate • ₹ 2,00,000 & Gold Medal with a certificate • ₹ 2,00,000 & Gold Medal with a certificate

== Jury ==
A committee headed by director Kavitha Lankesh was appointed to evaluate the awards. Other jury members were actress Rekha Rao, cinematographer Basavaraj, Director KN Vaidyanath and singer Chandrika Gururaj.

== Film awards ==
Name of Award	Film	Producer	Director
First Best Film	Amaravathi	• Sushma. E • Madhava Reddy. E	B. M. Giriraj
Second Best Film	Railway Children	• Birthi Gangadhar • Chetana Gokul	Prithvi Konanur
Third Best Film	Antharjala	B. Nandakumar	Harish M. D. Halli
Best Film of Social Concern	Mudla Seemeyalli		K. Shivarudraiah
Best Children Film	Jeerjimbe		Karthik Saraguru
Best Regional Film	Madipu (Tulu language)	Sandeep Kumar Nandalike	Chetan Mundadi
Best Entertaining Film	Kirik Party	• Rakshit Shetty • G. S. Guptha	Rishab Shetty
Best Debut Film Of Newcomer Director	Rama Rama Re...	D. Satya Prakash	D. Satya Prakash

== Other awards ==
Name of Award	Film	Awardee	Cash prize
Best Director	Amaravathi	B. M. Giriraj	₹ 1,00,000
Best Actor	Amaravathi	Achyuth Kumar	₹ 20,000
Best Actress	Beautiful Manasugalu	Shruti Hariharan	₹ 20,000
Best Supporting Actor	Kudla Cafe	Naveen D. Padil	₹ 20,000
Best Supporting Actress	Pallata	Akshata Pandavpura	₹ 20,000
Best Child Actor	Railway Children	K. Manohara	₹ 20,000
Best Child Actress	Jeerjimbe; Beti	Siri Vanalli; Revathy	₹ 20,000
Best Music Direction	Jeerjimbe	Charan Raj	₹ 20,000
Best Male Playback Singer	Beautiful Manasugalu ("Nammooralli Chaligaladalli")	Vijay Prakash	₹ 20,000
Best Female Playback Singer	Jalsa ("Nannede Beedige")	Sangeetha Ravindranath	₹ 20,000
Best Cinematography	Mungaru Male 2	Shekar Chandra	₹ 20,000
Best Editing	Mummy	C. Ravichandran	₹ 20,000
Best Lyrics	Jeerjimbe	Karthik Saragur	₹ 20,000
Best Art Direction	Uppina Kagada	Shashidhar Adapa	₹ 20,000
Best Story Writer	Raju Yedegebidda Akshara	Nandita Yadav	₹ 20,000
Best Screenplay	Kahi	Arvind Sastry	₹ 20,000
Best Dialogue Writer	Amaravathi	B. M. Giriraj	₹ 20,000
Jury's Special Award	Santheyalli Nintha Kabira; Mungaru Male 2	Chinmayee (For Costume design); K. V. Manjaiah (For Production control)	₹ 20,000 each
