= 2009–10 Karnataka State Film Awards =

Annual Indian film awards ceremony

44th Karnataka State Film Awards
- Awarded for: Best Of Kannada Films in 2009
- Awarded by: Government of Karnataka
- Presented by: D. V. Sadananda Gowda (Chief Minister of Karnataka)
- Date: 15 May 2012
- Site: Bengaluru, Karnataka, India

Highlights
- Best Film: Rasarushi Kuvempu
- Best Direction: Rithwik Simha
- Best Actor: Vishnuvardhan
- Best Actress: Anu Prabhakar
- Lifetime achievement: • R. N. Sudarshan (Dr. Rajkumar Award) • C. V. Shivashankar (Puttanna Kanagal Award) • S. D. Ankalagi (Dr. Vishnuvardhan Award)

The 2009–10 Karnataka State Film Awards, presented by Government of Karnataka, to felicitate the best of Kannada Cinema released in the year 2009. The ceremony was held on 15 May 2012.

== Lifetime achievement award ==
Name of Award	Awardee(s)	Awarded As
• Dr. Rajkumar Award • Puttanna Kanagal Award • Dr. Vishnuvardhan Award	• R. N. Sudarshan • C. V. Shivashankar • S. D. Ankalagi	• Supporting Actor, Director • Director, Lyricist • Producer

== Jury ==
A committee headed by Dwarakish was appointed to evaluate the feature films awards.

== Film awards ==
Name of Award	Film	Producer	Director
First Best Film	Rasarushi Kuvempu	• Aravind Prakash • Padma Prakash	Rithwik Simha
Second Best Film	Manasaare	Rockline Venkatesh	Yogaraj Bhat
Third Best Film	Love Guru	Naveen	Prashanth Raj
Best Film Of Social Concern	Shabari	Ramesh Yadav	Baraguru Ramachandrappa
Best Children Film	Gurukula	Sunil Puranik	Sunil Puranik
Best Children Film	Kinnara Baale	Everest India Films	P. H. Vishwanath
Best Regional Film	Kazaar (Konkani language)		

== Other awards ==
Name of Award	Film	Awardee(s)
Best Direction	Rasarushi Kuvempu	Rithwik Simha
Best Actor	Aptharakshaka	Vishnuvardhan
Best Actress	Pareekshe	Anu Prabhakar
Best Supporting Actor	Banni	Neenasam Ashwath
Best Supporting Actress	Runaanubandha	Chandrakala Mohan
Best Child Actor	Ekameva	Chiranjeevi
Best Child Actress	Kinnara Baale	Madhushree
Best Female Playback Singer	Aptharakshaka ("Omkara")	Lakshmi Nataraj
Best Cinematography	Kallara Santhe	Sundaranath Suvarna
Best Lyrics	Sathya ("Eradakshara")	V. Nagendra Prasad
Best Sound Recording	Just Maath Maathalli	Kumar
Best Art Direction	Aptharakshaka	S. A. Venugopal
Best Screenplay	Eddelu Manjunatha	Guruprasad
Best Dialogue Writer	Banni	Godachi Maharudrappa
Best Male Dubbing Artist	Banni	Siddaraj Kalyankar
Best Female Dubbing Artist	Just Maath Maathalli	Deepa
Jury's Special Award	Kallara Santhe	Sumana Kittur (For Effective Directorial Debut)

== Controversy ==
On August 14, 2015 in an unprecedented move, the Government of Karnataka is taking back four State film awards conferred on two films.

The decision on conferring these awards has been questioned by S. Radha in the High Court of Karnataka on the contention that the applications for these awards were accepted after the expiry of the deadline fixed by the government to receive entries. The government, according to sources in the Information Department, is making an all-out effort to “avoid humiliation” and are appealing to the recipients to return the awards.

The taken awards are as follows:

- Best Story - Nagathihalli Chandrashekar for Olave Jeevana Lekkachaara
- Best Male Playback Singer - Tippu
- Best Music Director - V. Harikrishna
- Best Editor - Srinivas P. Babu

Above three awards for Raaj The Showman
