= 2015 Karnataka State Film Awards =

Annual Indian film awards ceremony

- Date: 13 November 2016
- Location: Bengaluru
- Country: India
- Presented by: Siddaramaiah (Chief Minister of Karnataka)

Highlights
- Most wins: Thithi (4)

The Karnataka State Film Awards 2015 were presented by the Government of Karnataka, to felicitate the best of Kannada Cinema released in the year 2015. The awards ceremony was held in Bengaluru on 13 November 2016.

== Lifetime achievement award ==
For the first time, a separate jury was appointed to select the Lifetime Achievement Awards under the chairmanship of veteran director S. K. Bhagavan.

| Name of Award | Awardee(s) | Awarded As |
|---|---|---|
| • Dr. Rajkumar Award • Puttanna Kanagal Award • Dr. Vishnuvardhan Award | • Harini • Nagathihalli Chandrashekar • Rajan | • Actress • Director • Music Director |

== Jury ==
A committee headed by Naganna was appointed to evaluate the awards.

== Film awards ==
| Name of Award | Film | Producer | Director |
|---|---|---|---|
| First Best Film | Thithi | Prathap Reddy | Raam Reddy |
| Second Best Film | Maarikondavaru | Gururaj Seth | K. Shivarudraiah |
| Third Best Film | Mythri | N. S. Rajkumar | B. M. Giriraj |
| Best Film of Social Concern | Shivayogi Sri Puttayyajja | Shyam Mukund Navale | Hamsa Vijeth |
| Best Children Film | Mane Modala Paathashaale | N. T. Jayarama Reddy | N. T. Jayarama Reddy |
| Best Regional Film | Thalang Neer (Kodava language) | Dr Naveen Krishna | Gopi Peenya |
| Best Entertaining Film | Krishna Leela | Ajay Rao | Shashank |
| Best Debut Film Of Newcomer Director | RangiTaranga | H.K.Prakash | Anup Bhandari |

== Other awards ==
| Name of Award | Film | Awardee |
|---|---|---|
| Best Director | Thithi | Raam Reddy |
| Best Actor | Shivayogi Sri Puttayyajja | Vijay Raghavendra |
| Best Actress | Ganga | Malashri |
| Best Supporting Actor | Mana Manthana | Ramesh Bhat |
| Best Supporting Actress | Thithi | S. M. Pooja |
| Best Child Actor | Ashtavakra | Likhit Sharma |
| Best Child Actress | Savi Nilaya | Mevish |
| Best Music Direction | Krishna Leela | Sridhar V. Sambhram |
| Best Male Playback Singer | Preethiyalli Sahaja ("Sundarangiye") | Santhosh Venky |
| Best Female Playback Singer | Bekku ("Thalamalada Maleyalli") | Shamitha Malnad |
| Best Cinematography | Last Bus | Ananth Urs |
| Best Editing | Chandi Kori | Sujith Nayak |
| Best Lyrics | Muddu Manase ("Edeyal Yaaro Ghazhal") | V. Nagendra Prasad |
| Best Art Direction | Last Bus | Avinash Narasimharaju |
| Best Story Writer | July 22, 1947 | Sarajoo Katkar |
| Best Screenplay | Krishna Leela | • Shashank • Raghu Kovi |
| Best Dialogue Writer | Thithi | Eeregowda |
| Jury's Special Award | Shivalinga | Jupiter Animation (For Computer Graphics) |
