= Karnataka State Film Award for Third Best Film =

Indian film award

- State award for contributions to Kannada cinema
- Sponsored by: Government of Karnataka
- Rewards: Silver Medal; ₹50,000
- First award: 1966-67
- Final award: 2021
- Most recent winner: Bisilu Kudure

Highlights
- Total awarded: 56
- First winner: Sandhya Raga

The Karnataka State Film Award for Third Best Film is one of the Karnataka State Film Awards presented annually since the awards were instituted for films in 1966–67. The award is given to Kannada films produced in the year.

The makers of Sandhya Raga (1966) were the first recipients and those of Bisilu Kudure (2021) the latest.

== Awards ==
All the awardees are awarded with a cash prize of ₹50,000 and a 100-gram silver medal. Award winners include producer and director of the film.

== Winners ==
Year	Film	Producer(s)	Director(s)	Refs.
1966-67	Sandhya Raga	• A. C. Narasimha Murthy • A. Prabhakara Rao	• S. K. Bhagavan • A. C. Narasimha Murthy	
1967-68	Bangarada Hoovu	B. A. Arasu Kumar	B. A. Arasu Kumar	
1968-69	Mannina Maga	• M. V. Venkatachalam • Alexander	Geethapriya	
1969-70	Mukthi	K. S. Krishnaswamy	N. Lakshminarayan	
1969-70	Eradu Mukha	• B. V. Srinivas • K. S. Prasad • A. S. Bhakthavathsalam	M. R. Vittal	
1970-71	Kula Gourava	N. Veeraswamy	Peketi Sivaram	
1971-72	Yaava Janmada Maitri	M. V. Venkatachalam	Geethapriya	
1971-72	Sipayi Ramu	Bhagavathi Productions	Y. R. Swamy	
1973-74	Abachurina Post Office	N. Lakshminarayan	Pathre C. Vinayak	
1974-75	Bhakta Kumbara	Hunsur Krishnamurthy	Anuradha Devi	
1975-76	Premada Kanike	V. Somashekar	Jayadevi	
1976-77	Kakana Kote	C. R. Simha	M. R. Jayaraj, M. C. Satyanarayana	
1977-78	Anuroopa	P. Lankesh	P. Lankesh	
1978-79	Parasangada Gendethimma	Maruthi Shivaram	Subramani, Honnayya, A. Shivaram, P. Dorairaj, M. Nagarajan	
1979-80	Chandanada Gombe	Dorairaj, S. K. Bhagavan	Bhaktavatsalan, Ramachandra, Dorairaj, S. K. Bhagavan	
1980-81	Sangeetha	Chandrashekhara Kambara	Wheel Productions	
1981-82	Baadada Hoo	K. V. Jayaram	K. S. Narayan	
1982-83	Anveshane	T. S. Nagabharana	Raja, Sarojamma	
1983-84	Nodi Swamy Navirodu Heege	Shankar Nag	Shankar Nag	
1984-85	Marali Goodige	Balaji	K. R. Shantharam	
1985-86	Abhimana	P. N. Srinivas	P. Krishnaraj	
1986-87	Madhvacharya	G. V. Iyer	Ananthalakshmi Films	
1987-88	Kaadina Benki	Suresh Heblikar	Manasa Arts	
1988-89	Sankranthi	N. R. Nanjunde Gowda	K. S. Sachchidanand, Dharmaraj	
1989-90	Prathama Ushakirana	Suresh Heblikar	Maanasa Arts	
1990-91	Bhujangayyana Dashavathara	Lokesh	Girija Lokesh, Latha, Jayamma	
1991-92	Pathitha Pavani			
1992-93	Harakeya Kuri	K. S. L. Swamy	B. V. Radha	
1993-94	Shhh!	Upendra	Kumar Govind	
1994-95	Yarigu Helbedi	Kodlu Ramakrishna	Asha Gunashekar, Padmalatha	
1995-96	Beladingala Baale	Sunil Kumar Desai	B. S. Murali	
1996-97	Nagareeka	Y. Nanjundappa	Saraswathi Gopal Jois	
1997-98	Nodu Baa Nammoora	N. R. Nanjunde Gowda	Chandrashekar, Kripa Shankar, H. C. Srinivas, N. R. Nanjunde Gowda	
1998-99	Doni Saagali	Rajendra Singh Babu	H. N. Maruthi, N. M. Madhusudan Gowda	
1999-2000	Chandramukhi Pranasakhi	Seetharam Karanth	Prakash Babu	
2000-01	Kurigalu Saar Kurigalu	• Jai Jagadish • Vijayalakshmi Singh • Dushyanth Singh	S. V. Rajendra Singh Babu	
2001-02	Neela	Drushti Srushti	T. S. Nagabharana	
2002-03	Laali Haadu	Sa. Ra. Govindu	H. Vasu	
2003-04	Chandra Chakori	Anitha Kumaraswamy	S. Narayan	
2004-05	Gowdru	Sandesh Nagaraj	S. Mahendar	
2005-06	Amrithadhare	• Nagathihalli Chandrashekar • Niveditha Venkatesh • Shailaja Rao • Rajashree Ramesh	Nagathihalli Chandrashekhar	
2006–07	Cyanide	• Kenchappa Gowda • Indumathi	A. M. R. Ramesh	
2007–08	Maathaad Maathaadu Mallige	K. Manju	Nagathihalli Chandrashekhar	
2008-09	Shankara Punyakoti	• Amarnath Hegde • Srinivas Sooda	G. Murthy	
2009–10	Love Guru	Naveen	Prashant Raj	
2010–11	Manasa	Anita Rani	Kodlu Ramakrishna	
2011	Allide Nammane Illi Bande Summane	Roopa Saurav	Gopi Peenya	
2012	Edegarike	• Syed Aman Bachchan • M. S. Ravindra	Sumana Kittur	
2013	Prakruthi	• S. Lakshmidevi • V. Ashok Kumar • Panchakshari	Panchakshari	
2014	Haggada Kone	• Umesh Banakar • Dayal Padmanabhan	Dayal Padmanabhan	
2015	Mythri	N. S. Rajkumar	B. M. Giriraj	
2016	Antharjala	Harish M. D. Halli	B. Nandakumar	
2017	Paddayi	Nithyananda Pai	Abhaya Simha	
2018	Ondalla Eradalla	Umapathy Srinivas	D Satya Prakash	
2019	Arghyam	Y. Srinivas	Y. Srinivas	
2020	Hariva Nadige Maiyella Kalu	Babu Eshwar Prasad	Babu Eshwar Prasad	
2021	Bisilu Kudure	Hridaya Shiva	Hridaya Shiva	

== See also ==
- Karnataka State Film Award for First Best Film
- Karnataka State Film Award for Second Best Film
