= Santha Shishunala Sharifa =

Santha Shishunala Sharifa (movie)
- Directed by: T. S. Nagabharana
- Written by: T. S. Nagabharana; C. Ashwath; Basavaraj
- Produced by: Srihari Khoday; Mahima Patel
- Starring: Sridhar; Girish Karnad; Hema Chaudhary; Suman Ranganathan; Master Jayanth
- Cinematography: S. Ramachandra
- Edited by: Suresh Urs
- Music by: C. Ashwath
- Production company: Yajaman Enterprises
- Release date: 1 January 1990
- Running time: 119 minutes
- Country: India
- Language: Kannada

Santha Shishunala Sharifa (Kannada: ಸಂತ ಶಿಶುನಾಳ ಶರೀಫ) is a 1990 Indian Kannada biographical drama film directed and co-written by T. S. Nagabharana and produced by Srihari Khoday and Mahima Patel for Yajaman Enterprises. The story is based on the life of acclaimed saint poet Shishunala Sharif who wrote several moral poems striving towards social reformation. A collection of Sharif's poems are set to tunes by C. Ashwath, who also did the major playback singing. The soundtrack consisting of 16 poems was extremely popular upon release. The dialogues for this movie was written by Gopala Wajapayi, a well known theatre figure and translator of Bertolt Brecht's play The Caucasian Chalk Circle.

The film's cast comprised Sridhar in the title role along with Girish Karnad, Suman Ranganathan and H. G. Dattatreya, Hema Chaudhary among others.

The film was widely appreciated by critics and audience upon release. It went on to win Nargis Dutt Award for Best Feature Film on National Integration. The film also received multiple Karnataka State Film Awards including Best Film, Best Actor and Best Supporting Actor categories.

== Plot ==
Shishunala Sharif (Shridhar) was born of Muslim parents in Shishuvinahala, a village in Dharwad district (now in Haveri district) of Karnataka in 1829. Shocking both the Hindus and Muslims, he studied under the Hindu Guru Govinda Bhatta (Girish Karnad) and at the same time discovered that Vachana literature and the teaching of mystic saint Allama Prabhu. Under these influences, he composed devotional lyrics which are still sung today. His own philosophy based on Hindu-Muslim unity, discarding the inequalities of caste, creed and religion. Poverty and death of his wife (Suman Ranganathan) made him a wanderer and he toured the country singing his songs. He died in 1889 on his birthday. Today Hindus and Muslims throng to the grave of this saint, who belonged to both religions equally.

== Cast ==
- Sridhar as Sharifa
- Girish Karnad as Govinda Bhatta
- Suman Ranganathan as Fatima, Sharifa's wife
- H. G. Dattatreya as Imam Sab, Sharifa's Father
- Hema Chaudhary as Hajju Maa, Sharifa's Mother
- Master Jayanth as Child Sharif
- Brahmavar
- Venkata Rao as Mullah Sab
- Vishwanath Rao
- Shankar Rao
- Prem Kumar

== Soundtrack ==
The music of the film was composed by C. Ashwath. All the 16 songs composed for this film have been from the literary work collection of poet Shishunala Sharif. The songs are rendered by popular Sugama Sangeetha singers with most of them sung by Ashwath himself.

Track listing
No.	Title	Lyrics	Singer(s)	Length
1.	"Savaalondu Ninna Mela"	Shishunala Sharif	Yashwanth Halibandi
2.	"Kukku Enuthide Belava"	Shishunala Sharif	B. R. Chaya
3.	"Haakida Janivaarava"	Shishunala Sharif	Shimoga Subbanna, B. R. Chaya
4.	"Alabeda Thangi Alabeda"	Shishunala Sharif	Shimoga Subbanna
5.	"Biddiyabbe Muduki"	Shishunala Sharif	Shimoga Subbanna
6.	"Kodagana Koli Nungitha"	Shishunala Sharif	C. Ashwath
7.	"Sneha Madabekinthavala"	Shishunala Sharif	C. Ashwath
8.	"Mohada Hendathi Theerida Balika"	Shishunala Sharif	C. Ashwath
9.	"Ellaranthavanalla Nanna Ganda"	Shishunala Sharif	C. Ashwath
10.	"Soruthihudu Maneya Maaligi"	Shishunala Sharif	C. Ashwath
11.	"Gudiya Nodiranna"	Shishunala Sharif	C. Ashwath
12.	"Nadiyo Devara Chakarige"	Shishunala Sharif	C. Ashwath
13.	"Tharavalla Thagi Ninna"	Shishunala Sharif	C. Ashwath
14.	"Naana Embudu Naanalla"	Shishunala Sharif	C. Ashwath
15.	"Dukh Me Pada Mann"	Shishunala Sharif	C. Ashwath
16.	"Hum Tho Dekha"	Shishunala Sharif	C. Ashwath

== Awards ==
The film has won the following awards since its release.

Indian National Film Awards 1989

- Won – National Film Award for Best Film on National Integration

1989-90 Karnataka State Film Awards (India)

- Won – Karnataka State Film Award for Second Best Film
- Won – Karnataka State Film Award for Best Actor – Sridhar
- Won – Karnataka State Film Award for Best Supporting Actor – Girish Karnad
