= Chinnari Mutha =

- CD cover
- Directed by: T. S. Nagabharana
- Screenplay by: T. S. Nagabharana; C. Ashwath
- Produced by: Nagini Bharana; Saroja; G. Nandakumar
- Starring: Master Vijay Raghavendra; H. G. Dattatreya
- Cinematography: B. C. Gowrishankar
- Edited by: Suresh Urs
- Music by: C. Ashwath
- Production company: Shruthalaya Films
- Release date: 13 August 1993
- Running time: 116 minutes
- Country: India
- Language: Kannada

Chinnari Mutta (transl. Mutha, the Golden Boy) is a 1993 Indian Kannada language children's film, directed by T. S. Nagabharana, starring H. G. Dattatreya and Master Vijay Raghavendra.

At the 41st National Film Awards, the film was awarded the Best Feature Film in Kannada. It also won four awards at the 1993-94 Karnataka State Film Awards; Best Children Film, Best Music Director (C. Ashwath), Best Child Actor - Male (Master Vijay Raghavendra) and Best Female Playback Singer (Manjula Gururaj).

== Plot ==
Mutha is a vibrant young boy. He belongs to the lower strata of society. He lives with his grandmother, who is barely able to manage with small earnings, by selling firewood. Running fast was an integral part of Mutha. But neither he nor the people around him were aware of this innate talent. The playful Mutha becomes a lonely soul after the grandmother dies and becomes a bonded labourer in the house of village head. He is not only missing the love and care of grandmother, but also the freedom to go out and play with his friends. He manages to coax the village head into permitting him to take the cattle to the forest for grazing. Now he is back with his friends in the forest. His joy knows no bounds.

One day, while they are playing, one of the cows goes astray. Frightened of the consequences, He runs away from the village and ultimately finds himself in a big city, Bengaluru. Everything is a strange experience for him there. He gets into a group of young boys engaged in shoe-lifting as a livelihood under the loving care and able guidance of Daada. He is a lonely old man, who finds his own happiness in the company of these young lads. One day, when Mutha is running away with stolen shoes from a stadium, he is chased and caught by Saavant, a professional coach training athletes in running. Instead of a thief, Saavant sees the potential of a great runner in Mutha. Saavant takes Mutha under his care and starts training him for running race. Slowly and steadily, Mutha comes up as an acknowledged runner and with hard training and perseverance, goes on to win the gold medal in the state level competition. He wants to bring all those Daada's boys also into Saavant's camp, so that they can also experience the thrill of a purposeful life as he has experienced. He persuades Daada and Saavant also convinces Daada. The boys join Mutha. Saavant trains them all and creates a fine team for the relay races. The team wins the relay race in All India Competition.

== Cast ==
- Master Vijay Raghavendra as Mutha
- H. G. Dattatreya as Daada
- Avinash as Saavant
- Krishne Gowda
- Shanthamma as Muttha's grandmother
- Ashok Badaradinni
- Jayaram
- K. S. Sridhar
- Master Pavan Kumar
- Master Abhinay
- Master Yashu Raj
- Sudharani in a special appearance in song "Maarisha Maarisha"
- Srridhar in a special appearance in song "Maarisha Maarisha"
- Ashwini Nachappa (Guest appearance)
- Shivaram (Guest appearance)
- Sundar Raj (Guest appearance)
- M. S. Karanth (Guest appearance)
- Sriimurali as blue shirt boy in song "Mannali Biddonu" (uncredited)

== Soundtrack ==
Chinnari Mutha
- Soundtrack cover

Soundtrack album by C. Aswath
- Released: 25 December 2000
- Genre: Feature film soundtrack
- Length: 48:53
- Label: Akash Audio

C. Aswath composed the background score the film and the soundtrack, with lyrics for the soundtrack penned by H. S. Venkateshamurthy. The soundtrack album has eleven tracks.

Tracklist
| No. | Title | Lyrics | Singer(s) | Length |
|---|---|---|---|---|
| 1. | "Mannalli Biddano" | H. S. Venkateshamurthy | Ajith, Baby Rekha | 5:31 |
| 2. | "Rekke Iddare Saake" | H. S. Venkateshamurthy | Baby Rekha | 5:12 |
| 3. | "Naavu Irruvaaga" | H. S. Venkateshamurthy | Ajith, Baby Rekha | 4:08 |
| 4. | "Maarisha Maarisha" | H. S. Venkateshamurthy | Narasimha Nayak, Manjula Gururaj | 5:30 |
| 5. | "Ondu Eradu Mooru" | H. S. Venkateshamurthy | Narasimha Nayak | 3:55 |
| 6. | "Oduva Siri Oduva" | H. S. Venkateshamurthy | Narasimha Nayak, Baby Rekha, Sangeetha | 1:42 |
| 7. | "Myale Kuvukonda" | H. S. Venkateshamurthy | Manjula Gururaj | 5:19 |
| 8. | "Halli Mukka Muthu" | H. S. Venkateshamurthy | Ajith and others | 3:17 |
| 9. | "Chandra Ninge" | H. S. Venkateshamurthy | Ajith and others | 4:37 |
| 10. | "Estondu Jana" | H. S. Venkateshamurthy | Baby Rekha and others | 5:30 |
| 11. | "Chinnari Mutha" | H. S. Venkateshamurthy | Narasimha Nayak | 4:12 |
| Total length: | | | | 48:53 |
