= 2021 Karnataka State Film Awards =

Annual Indian film awards

56th Karnataka State Film Awards
- Awarded for: Best of Kannada Cinema in 2021
- Presented by: Siddaramaiah (Chief Minister of Karnataka)
- Announced on: 4 October 2025
- Site: Bengaluru, Karnataka, India

Highlights
- Best Direction: Raghu K. M. Doddahatti Boregowda
- Best Actor: Rakshit Shetty; 777 Charlie
- Best Actress: Archana Jois; Mute
- Most awards: 777 Charlie (4)

The 2021 Karnataka State Film Awards, presented by Government of Karnataka, felicitated the best of Karnataka cinema released in the year 2021. The selection advisory committee was headed by senior journalist, Sadashiva Shenoy.

The film 777 Charlie emerged as the biggest winner with four awards: Best Second Film, Best Actor, Best Lyrics and Best Editing.

== Lifetime achievement award ==
Award title	Awardee(s)	Awarded As	Awards
Dr. Rajkumar Award	–	–	₹2,00,000 and a gold medal with a certificate
Puttanna Kanagal Award	–	–	₹2,00,000 and a gold medal with a certificate
Dr. Vishnuvardhan Award	–	–	₹2,00,000 and a gold medal with a certificate

== Film awards ==
Award title	Film	Producer(s)	Director
First Best Film	Doddahatti Boregowda	• B. C. Shashikumar • K. M. Lokesh	Raghu K. M.
Second Best Film	777 Charlie	Paramvah Studios	Kiranraj K.
Third Best Film	Bisilu Kudure	Hridaya Shiva	Hridaya Shiva
Best Film of Social Concern	–	–	–
Best Children Film	Cake	Parikshit Ishwar	Kishore Moodbidri
Best Regional Film	Nada Peda Asha (Kodava language)	• Eramanda Harini Vijay Uttaiah • Yeshoda Prakash	Prakash Kariappa
Best Entertaining Film	Yuvarathnaa	Vijay Kiragandur	Santhosh Ananddram
Best Debut Film of Newcomer Director	Badava Rascal	• Dhananjay • Rizwan	Shankar Guru

== Other awards ==
Award title	Film	Awardee	Cash prize
Best Director	Nada Peda Asha	Prakash Kariappa	₹ 1,00,000
Best Actor	777 Charlie	Rakshit Shetty	₹ 20,000
Best Actress	Mute	Archana Jois	₹ 20,000
Best Supporting Actor	Rathnan Prapancha	Pramod Panju	₹ 20,000
Best Supporting Actress	Rathnan Prapancha	Umashree	₹ 20,000
Best Child Actor	Cake	Athish Shetty	₹ 20,000
Best Child Actress	Bhairavi	Baby Bhairavi	₹ 20,000
Best Music Direction	Bisilu Kudure	Imtiaz Sultan	₹ 20,000
Best Male Playback Singer	Sri Jagannatha Dasaru	Aneesh Keshava Rao	₹ 20,000
Best Female Playback Singer	Dandi	Sahana M. Bharadwaj	₹ 20,000
Best Cinematography	Amme Samsara (Konkani film)	Bhuvanesh Prabhu	₹ 20,000
Best Editing	777 Charlie	Prateek Shetty	₹ 20,000
Best Lyrics	777 Charlie	Nagarjun Sharma	₹ 20,000
Best Art Direction	Bhajarangi 2	Ravi S	₹ 20,000
Best Story Writer	Ombatthu Sullu Kathegalu	Manjunath Muniyappa	₹ 20,000
Best Screenplay	Doddahatti Boregowda	Raghu K. M.	₹ 20,000
Best Dialogue Writer	Thayi Kasthur Gandhi	Baraguru Ramachandrappa	₹ 20,000
Jury's Special Award	Bhairavi	(Special mention - Film of merit)	₹ 20,000 each
Jury's Special Award	Bhajarangi 2	Yogi G. Raj (costume design)	₹ 20,000 each
Jury's Special Award	Thayi Kasthur Gandhi	Shivakumar (Makeup)	₹ 20,000 each
Best Book on Kannada Cinema	–	–	₹ 20,000
Best Short Film	–	–	₹ 20,000
