= S. Ramachandra =

Indian cinematographer

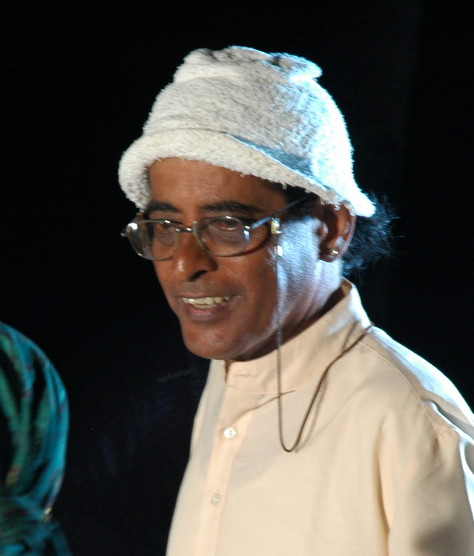
- Ramachandra at the filming of Gulabi Talkies, 2006
- Born: 16 November 1948; Bangalore, Mysore State
- Died: 10 January 2011 (aged 62); Bangalore, Karnataka
- Education: FTII Graduate in Cinematography
- Occupation: Cinematographer
- Awards: National Film Award for Best Cinematography (1977); Lifetime Contribution to Kannada Cinema Award (2006); Multiple Karnataka State Film Award for Best Cinematography

Shivaramaiah Ramachandra Aithal (Kannada: ಶಿವರಾಮಯ್ಯ ರಾಮಚಂದ್ರ ಐತಾಳ; 16 November 1948 – 10 January 2011), popularly known as S. Ramachandra, was a National Award-winning Indian cinematographer. In 2006, he was honoured with Lifetime Contribution to Kannada Cinema Award at the Karnataka State Film Awards. He was recognised as a gifted cinematographer and as a force behind the offbeat films in Kannada cinema.

== Career ==
After securing fifth rank in the Pre-University Course, Ramachandra went to the National Film and Television Institute in Pune to learn Cinematography. Upon returning he worked as the Assistant Cameraman for U.M.N. Sharif, who shot Vamsha Vriksha directed by Girish Karnad and B.V. Karanth. It was during the shooting of Vamsha Vriksha that P.V. Nanjaraja Urs, who identified Ramachandra's talent, asked him to work for his feature film "Sankalpa" which was Ramachandra's first venture as an Independent Cinematographer. He later worked with B.V. Karanth for the Award Winning film Chomana Dudi. He also worked in commercial films with directors like Nagabharana and K.V.Jayaram.

S. Ramachandra's work in films directed by Girish Kasaravalli brought him accolades. His association with Girish Kasaravalli began with the National Award-winning film Ghatashradhdha. Later he worked on Akramana, Mane, Kraurya, Naayi Neralu, Hasina and Gulabi Talkies.

== Professional ==
Ramachandra was the President of Karnataka Cinematographer's Association for nearly a decade, where he worked to secure the future of Cinematographers of the Kannada Film Industry

He was a founding member of Chitrasamuha, a filmmakers' platform for appreciation of cinema aesthetics and he remained an active contributor until his death.

== Critical acclaim ==
Following quotes are about S. Ramachandra and his work.

"Ramachandra was the founding stone of the new wave of cinema. He worked enthusiastically with new directors."

— Girish Kasaravalli

"He did not profess an alternate cinema openly but supported a large number of filmmakers to look for alternate ways of making cinema both in content and construction."

— N. Vidyashankar, Festival Director, Bangalore International Film Festival

"He remained dedicated to the cause of the New Wave in Kannada cinema and was instrumental in positioning Karnataka on the world map of meaningful cinema. He facilitated many young film-makers and first-time producers to meet each other on a common platform, willingly sharing his technical expertise and accumulated experience with them. Among the 70-odd films that he authored with his camera, he must have been responsible for no less than 40 debutant directors."

— G.S. Bhaskar, noted Cinematographer

== Awards ==
- 1977: National Film Award for Best Cinematography for Rishya Shringa
- 2006: Lifetime Contribution to Kannada Cinema Award
- Karnataka State Film Award for Best Cinematography
  - 1972–73: Sankalpa
  - 1976–77: Rushya Shringa
  - 1978–79: Grahana
  - 1989–90: Mane

== Death ==
S. Ramachandra was suffering from cancer. He was admitted to the Bangalore Institute of Oncology where he was pronounced dead on 10 January 2011.

Chitra Varsha: Cinematography of Ramachandra, a year long festival of his films was organised by Chitra Samuha and K. V. Subbanna Aptha Samuha in 2011.

At least one film 'Thallana' is dedicated to him.

== Filmography ==
=== Television ===
Year	Film	Language	Other notes
1987	Malgudi Days	Hindi	Cinematographer
1991	Swami and Friends (part 1)	Hindi	Cinematographer
1988	Stone Boy (TV Series)	Hindi	Cinematographer
2002	Ondu Saavina Sutta (Tele Film)	Kannada	Cinematographer
2002	Sakshi (Tele Film)	Kannada	Screenwriter, director, cinematographer
2003	Grihabhanga (TV Series)	Kannada	Cinematographer
????	Malegalalli madumagalu (TV Series)	Kannada	Cinematographer (first 15 episodes)

=== Films ===
An incomplete list of S. Ramachandra's Films also highlights his association with Award-winning Films

Year	Film	Director(s)	Other notes
1972	Vamsha Vriksha	B.V. Karanth & Girish Karnad	Associate Cameraman
1972	Sankalpa	P.V. Nanjaraja Urs	Winner : Karnataka State Film Award for Best Cinematographer; Karnataka State Film Award for Best Film
1974	Kankana	M.B.S. Prasad	National Film Award for Best Feature Film in Kannada
1975	Chomana Dudi	B.V. Karanth	National Film Award for Best Feature Film; Karnataka State Film Award for Best Film
1976	Pallavi	P. Lankesh	National Film Award for Best Feature Film in Kannada; Karnataka State Film Award for Best Film
1976	Rushya Shringa	V.R.K. Prasad	Winner : National Film Award for Best Cinematography; Winner : Karnataka State Film Award for Best Cinematographer
1977	Ghatashraddha	Girish Kasaravalli	National Film Award for Best Feature Film; Karnataka State Film Award for Best Film
1978	Grahana	T.S. Nagabharana	Winner : Karnataka State Film Award for Best Cinematographer (B&W); Nargis Dutt Award for Best Feature Film on National Integration; Karnataka State Film Award for Best Film
1978	Geejagana Goodu	T.S. Ranga	
1978	Hombisilu	Geethapriya	
1978	Malaya Makkalu	K. Shivaram Karanth	
1978	Vathsalya Patha	A. S. R. Rao	
1978	Parasangada Gendethimma	Maruthi Shivram	
1979	Akramana	Girish Kasaravalli	
1979	Dange Edda Makkalu	P. Vadiraj	
1979	Nammamana Sose	P. Vadiraj	
1980	Bangarada Jinke	T.S. Nagabharana	
1980	Sangeetha	Chandrashekhara Kambara	
1981	Jaala	S. Ranganath	
1981	Chadurida Chitragalu	N. T. Jayaram Reddy	
1983	Banker Margayya	T.S. Nagabharana	National Film Award for Best Feature Film in Kannada
1983	Anveshane	T.S. Nagabharana	
1983	Gandharvagiri	N. S. Dhananjaya (Datthu)	
1983	Mududida Tavare Aralithu	K. V. Jayaram	
1983	Nyaya Gedditu	Joe Simon	
1983	Premayuddha	T.S. Nagabharana	
1983	Simhasana	C. R. Simha	
1984	Olave Baduku	K. V. Jayaram	
1986	Prema Jaala	Joe Simon	
1987	Huli Hebbuli	Vijay	
1987	Avasthe	Krishna Masadi	
1987	Nyayakke Shikshe	Srinivas	
1987	Romanchana	G S Panicker	
1987	Sampradaya	Master Hirannayya	
1988	Bhujangayyana Dashavathara	Lokesh	Nargis Dutt Award for Best Feature Film on National Integration
1988	Aasphota	T.S. Nagabharana	Karnataka State Film Award for Best Film
1988	Mathrudevobhava	N. S. Dhananjaya (Datthu)	
1989	Hongkongnalli Agent Amar	Joe Simon	
1989	Singari Bangari	Chandrahasa Alva	
1990	Santha Shishunala Sharifa	T.S. Nagabharana	
1990	Swami	Shankar Nag	
1991	Mane	Girish Kasaravalli	Winner : Karnataka State Film Award for Best Cinematographer; National Film Award for Best Feature Film in Kannada
1991	Ek Ghar	Girish Kasaravalli	Language : Hindi
1992	Undoo Hoda Kondoo Hoda	Nagathihalli Chandrashekar	
1993	Kadambari	Kodlu Ramakrishna	
1994	Yarigu Helbedi	Kodlu Ramakrishna	
1995	Nilukada Nakshatra	Kodlu Ramakrishna	
1995	Kraurya	Girish Kasaravalli	National Film Award for Best Feature Film in Kannada
1996	Janani	Srivathsa Ranganath	
1996	Pooja	Bharathi Shankar	
1997	Gangavva Gangamaayi	Vasant Mokashi	
1998	The Out House	Leslie Carvalho	
1999	Deveeri	Kavitha Lankesh	Karnataka State Film Award for Best Film
1999	Kanooru Heggadithi	Girish Karnad	National Film Award for Best Feature Film in Kannada
2001	Alemari	Kavita Lankesh	
2003	Artha	B. Suresh	Karnataka State Film Award for Best Film
2004	Hasina	Girish Kasaravalli	National Film Award for Best Film on Family Welfare; Karnataka State Film Award for Best Social film
2004	Beru	P. Sheshadri	National Film Award for Best Feature Film in Kannada
2004	Pravaha	P. R. Ramadas Naidu	Karnataka State Film Award for Best Social film
2005	Naayi Neralu	Girish Kasaravalli	Karnataka State Film Award for Best Film
2005	Mukhamukhi	N. Sudarshan	
2006	Banada Neralu	Umashankar Swamy	Karnataka State Film Award for Best Social film
2007	Gulabi Talkies	Girish Kasaravalli	National Film Award for Best Feature Film in Kannada; Karnataka State Film Award for Best Film
2008	Vimukthi	P. Sheshadri	National Film Award for Best Feature Film in Kannada
2008	Moggina Jade	P. R. Ramadas Naidu	
2008	Haaru Hakkiyaneri	A. N. Prasanna	
2009	Daatu	K. Shivarudraiah	
2009	Mukhaputa	Roopa Iyer	Karnataka State Film Award for Best Social film
2009	Karavali Hudugi	Kodlu Ramakrishna	
2010	Gandhi Smiles	Krish Joshi	
2010	Beli Mattu Hola	P. R. Ramdasa Naidu	
2010	Hejjegalu	P. R. Ramadas Naidu	
2010	Prarthane	Sadashiva Shenoy	
