= Anveshane =

- Directed by: T. S. Nagabharana
- Written by: Girish Karnad; T. S. Nagabharana
- Screenplay by: Girish Karnad; T. S. Nagabharana
- Produced by: Raja; Sarojamma
- Starring: Anant Nag; Smita Patil; Girish Karnad; Sundar Raj; T. N. Balakrishna; Ramesh Bhat
- Cinematography: S. Ramachandra
- Edited by: J. Stanly
- Music by: Vijaya Bhaskar
- Production company: Sowmya Arts
- Release date: 1983 (India)
- Running time: 108 minutes
- Country: India
- Language: Kannada

Anveshane ( transl. Search) is a 1983 Indian Kannada film directed and co-written by T. S. Nagabharana. It stars Anant Nag, Smita Patil and Girish Karnad playing the pivotal roles. Nagabharana remade the film in Hindi with Om Puri titled Bin Bulaye Mehmaan (1981), but the film was incomplete.

== Plot ==
In the mid-1980s, Shyam and Revati live in a vatara (housing complex) with their two little girls and a host of other families. A vatara is a set of houses that are usually owned by one person and inhabited by many families. Shyam works for a travel agency while Revati is a school teacher. Both are working hard to make ends meet in a social structure that has been making it increasingly difficult for the middle class. There is a lot of affection and love in this family that lives under the prying nose of old, perverted and goofy men who are married to nosy, loud and annoying women. Day in and day out the couple follows a standard routine which involves everyday chores of getting the kids ready for school, making breakfast and heading off to work. The house is locked all day until they all return in the evening.

Ajja is the inquisitive old man who has nothing else to do all day except suspect every single event that occurs around him. He starts hearing radio sounds from the otherwise empty and locked house. This becomes a regular affair before the couple realizes something is amiss. They start noticing the fact that someone visits their home when they are not around. When the couple returns one evening they are shocked out of their living minds when they find a corpse right in the middle of their living room. Shekhar, playing the dead body, is the victim who seems to have been killed by an unknown hand. Fear and tension strikes the innocent couple whose main problem up until now was to get their daughters to wear shoes for school. They spend an entire night wondering what to do with their unwelcome guest that includes hiding him under their own bed and getting rid of his wallet. Their attempts at getting rid of the corpse go futile thanks to drunks and policemen who strategically appear out of nowhere. Somehow they manage to put the corpse in one of the rooms and the quest (Anveshane) about why he died in their house begins.

Dharwad-chap Rotti visits them one day looking for Shekhar. Shyam starts stalking Rotti and manages to end up in a rather amusing face-off with him one fine day. The story unfolds as we start picking up the chips of the story from Rotti's eyes. His connection with Shekhar unravels and all the pieces of this puzzle seem to fall into place.

== Cast ==
- Anant Nag as Shyam
- Girish Karnad as Rotti
- Smita Patil as Revathi
- Sundar Raj as Shekhar
- G. V. Shivanand
- Gode Lakshminarayana
- Ramesh Bhat
- T. N. Balakrishna as Ajja
- Prameela

== Soundtrack ==
Anveshane

Soundtrack album to Anveshane by Vijaya Bhaskar
- Language: Kannada
- Label: Deccan

All music is composed by Vijaya Bhaskar.

No.	Title	Lyrics	Singer(s)	Length
1.	"Aase Honalina Ramya Balanu"	Doddarange Gowda	Vani Jayaram
2.	"Mamateya Makkala Mallige"	Doddarange Gowda	Vani Jayaram

== Awards and honors ==
- 1982–83 Karnataka State Film Award — Third Best Film
