= Aasphota =

- Directed by: T. S. Nagabharana
- Written by: P. N. Rangan (Manu)
- Screenplay by: T. S. Nagabharana
- Based on: Ayana by Manu
- Produced by: A. Verghese
- Starring: Sridhar; H. G. Dattatreya; Triveni; Sudha Narasimharaju
- Cinematography: S. Ramachandra
- Edited by: Suresh Urs
- Music by: C. Ashwath; S. P. Venkatesh (background score)
- Release date: 1988
- Running time: 97 minutes
- Country: India
- Language: Kannada

Aasphota ( transl. Explosion) is 1988 Indian Kannada political drama film directed by T. S. Nagabharana, based on the novel Ayana by Manu (P. N. Rangan). The film stars Sridhar and H. G. Dattatreya, in his film debut, in the lead roles.

The film won numerous awards including the Best Film both in Filmfare Awards South and Karnataka State Film Awards and for the story, screenplay and Supporting acting.

== Cast ==
- Sridhar
- H. G. Dattatreya
- Triveni
- Sudha Narasimharaju
- Kasaragodu Chinna
- Ashok Badaradinni
- Rajkumar
- Manu
- G. V. Shivanand
- Vishwanatha Rao
- Shankar Rao
- Susheelamma
- Dinesh Mangaluru

== Soundtrack ==
Aasphota

Soundtrack album to Aasphota by C. Ashwath
- Language: Kannada
- Label: Lahari Music

The music of the film was composed by C. Ashwath.

No.	Song	Singers	Lyricist
1	"Krupe Thoro Srirama"	Nataraj Sharma	M. N. Vyasa Rao
2	"Snehadinda"	Puttur Narasimha Nayak, B. R. Chaya	M. N. Vyasa Rao
3	"Ninna Hejje Kande"	Puttur Narasimha Nayak, B. R. Chaya	M. N. Vyasa Rao
4	"Jeeva Mugidaaga"	C. Ashwath	Doddarange Gowda
5	"Thanu Manava"	Nataraj Sharma	Doddarange Gowda

== Awards and honors ==
Karnataka State Film Awards - 1987-88

1. Best Film
2. Best Supporting Actor - H. G. Dattatreya
3. Best Story - Manu
4. Best Screenplay - T. S. Nagabharana
- 1988 : Filmfare Awards South
1. Filmfare Award for Best Film - Kannada
