= Karnataka State Film Award for Best Short Film =

- State award for contributions to Kannada cinema
- Awarded for: Best Short Film of the year
- Sponsored by: Government of Karnataka
- Rewards: Silver Medal; ₹ 50000
- First award: 2015
- Final award: 2018
- Most recent winner: Paduvarahalli

Highlights
- Total awarded: 2
- First winner: Chowka Bara

The Karnataka State Film Award for Best Short Film is a state film award of the Indian state of Karnataka given during the annual Karnataka State Film Awards. The award honors the talented makers of Short Films in Kannada Cinema.

== Winners ==
Year	Film	Producer	Director	Refs.
2015	Chowka Bara	Sathish Ninasam	Raaghu Shivamogga	
2016	Anala	V. K. Sanjyothi	V. K. Sanjyothi	
2017				
2018	Paduvarahalli	V. Manoj Kumar	V. Manoj Kumar	
