= Grahana (film) =

- Directed by: T. S. Nagabharana
- Written by: Kodalli Shivaram
- Screenplay by: T. S. Ranga; T. S. Nagabharana
- Produced by: D. Rame Gowda; D. Shivaram; D. Venkatesh
- Starring: G. K. Govinda Rao; Malathi Rao; Sathyendra
- Cinematography: S. Ramachandra
- Edited by: J. Stanley
- Music by: Vijaya Bhaskar
- Distributed by: Harsha Pictures
- Release date: 1978
- Running time: 101 minutes
- Country: India
- Language: Kannada

Grahana ( transl. Eclipse) is a 1978 Indian Kannada drama film directed by T. S. Nagabharana and starring G. K. Govinda Rao.

At the 26th National Film Awards, the film was awarded the Best Feature Film on National Integration and Best Screenplay (T. S. Ranga and T. S. Nagabharana).

== Cast ==
- G. K. Govinda Rao as Narase Gowda
- Malathi Rao as Narase Gowda's wife
- Sathyendra as Puttaswamy Gowda

== Production ==
The film was initially conceived as a documentary before becoming a feature film. The film was mostly shot in the Honganuru village, where Nagabharana's grandfather had a house. Shooting progressed based on the number of negatives available similar to how it was done in theatre.

== Awards and honors ==
National Film Awards 1978

- Best Film on National Integration
- Best Screenplay – T S Ranga, T S Nagabharana

Karnataka State Film Awards 1978-79

- First Best Film
- Best Cinematographer (B&W) – S. Ramachandra
