= Ghatashraddha =

Ghatashraaddha
- Poster
- Directed by: Girish Kasaravalli
- Written by: U. R. Ananthamurthy
- Screenplay by: Girish Kasaravalli
- Based on: Ghatashraddha by U. R. Ananthamurthy
- Produced by: Sadananda Suvarna
- Starring: Meena Kuttappa; Ajith Kumar; Narayana Bhat
- Cinematography: S. Ramachandra
- Edited by: Umesh Kulkarni
- Music by: B. V. Karanth
- Distributed by: Suvarnagiri Films
- Release date: 1977
- Running time: 108 minutes
- Country: India
- Language: Kannada

Ghatashraaddha ( transl. The Ritual) is a 1977 Indian Kannada language film directed by Girish Kasaravalli starring Meena Kuttappa, Narayana Bhat and Ajith Kumar in lead roles. It is based on a novella by eminent Kannada writer U. R. Ananthamurthy. The film was Girish Kasaravalli's first feature film as a director, and marked not only the arrival of a promising new filmmaker but also that of Kannada cinema in the India's 'New Cinema' horizon.

The film won three awards at the 25th National Film Awards, awarded for films of 1977. It won the award for Best Feature Film, Best Music Direction (B. V. Karanth) and Best Child Artist (Ajith Kumar).

In 2002, Ghatashraddha became the only Indian film to be chosen by the National Archive of Paris among 100 others, during the centenary celebrations of cinema. At the 2009 International Film Festival of India, it was announced as one of the 20 best films in Indian cinema, having received 1.6 million votes.

== Plot ==
Udupa (Ramaswamy Iyengar) runs a run down Vedic school, operating from his house in a village. Apart from his uncontrollable and unruly students, he lives with his young daughter, Yamuna (Meena Kuttappa), already a widow. Naani (Ajit Kumar), the innocent boy from a distant village, is a new student. A bond develops between a homesick Naani and Yamuna. Yamuna has a lover, a school teacher, whom she meets clandestinely. She is also pregnant by him. As Udupa goes out of town to raise funds for his crumbling school, things go out of hand at the school. The students go out of control and soon the entire village knows about Yamuna's pregnancy. The traditional village members excommunicate Yamuna. Her lover gets the baby aborted without anyone's knowledge. Udupa returns and on finding out what has happened, performs the last rites of his living daughter. Amidst all these, Naani is the only person in the village determined to support her but not for long for his father comes back to take him away. Yamuna is shaved bald and is abandoned under a banyan tree.

== Cast ==
- Meena Kuttappa as Yamuna
- Narayana Bhat as Shastri
- Ajith Kumar as Naani
- Ramakrishna
- Shantha
- Ramaswamy Iyengar
- Jagannath
- B. Suresha
- H. S. Parvathi

== Production ==
Girish Kasaravalli approached U. R. Ananthamurthy for the rights of Ghatashraddha through dramatist K. V. Subbanna. Ananthamurthy, who was in the US at the time, gave his go-ahead on hearing the screenplay from Kasaravalli, on his return to India. It was on the former's suggestion that Meena Kuttappa, his former student, was signed to play the female lead in the film.

== Restoration ==
During February 2024, US film publication Variety announced that the Martin Scorsese's World Cinema Project, George Lucas' Hobson/Lucas Family Foundation and Shivendra Singh Dungarpur's Film Heritage Foundation (FHF) have partnered to restore the film in time for its 50th anniversary from the original camera negative preserved at India's National Film Development Corporation of India-National Film Archive of India.

The restored version of the film was showcased in the Venice Classics section of the 81st Venice International Film Festival, where it was given the English-language title The Ritual. It was also screened at the MAMI Mumbai Film Festival 2024 under the Restored Classics section.

== Awards ==
25th National Film Awards

- Best Feature Film
- Best Music Direction — B. V. Karanth
- Best Child Artist — Ajith Kumar

1977–78 Karnataka State Film Awards

- First Best Film
- Best Story — U. R. Ananthamurthy
- Best Screenplay — Girish Kasaravalli
- Best Child Actor — Ajith Kumar
