= S. Sathyendra =

Indian actor (1960–2026)

- Born: 6 June 1960
- Died: 28 May 2026 (aged 65); Chennai, Tamil Nadu, India
- Occupation: Actor
- Years active: 1977–2021

S. Sathyendra (6 June 1960 – 28 May 2026) was an Indian actor who appeared prominently in Tamil films apart from Kannada films in supporting and minor roles.

== Early life and career ==
Sathyendra was born into a Telugu family. He has two postgraduations in Kannada literature and Philosophy and B.A. in Drama and Diploma in French and German and has working knowledge in Italian and Spanish.

He played character roles in college plays and in amateur theatre and has worked as a theatre actor with B. V. Karanth and Girish Karnad. His first two films were the Kannada films Rishyasringa (1977) produced by G. V. Iyer and Grahana (1978). He has since played minor roles in Tamil films such as Sathyaa (1988).

Regarding his performance in 18 Vayasu (2012), a critic wrote, "It’s a remarkable portrayal by Satyendra as the cranky Jocky with his imaginary pistols, and his firm determination to help Karthik in his cause".

In 2023, he became viral after giving a negative review about Leo (2023) criticising Lokesh Kanagaraj's direction. He has since gained notoriety as a film critic.

== Death ==
Sathyendra had been admitted in the Government Royapettah Hospital, Chennai due to health-related complications. He died on 28 May 2026, at the age of 65.

== Filmography ==
Year	Film	Role	Language	Notes	Ref.
1977	Rishya Shringa	Unknown	Kannada		
1978	Grahana	Puttaswamy Gowda	Kannada		
1982	Ezhavathu Manithan		Tamil		
1983	Mann Vasanai	Street singer	Tamil	credited as Satya	
1984	Giddh	Veerappan's friend	Hindi	Uncredited roles	
1987	Kadamai Kanniyam Kattupaadu	Thief	Tamil	Uncredited roles	
1988	Sathya	Pickpocket	Tamil	credited as Sathyendran	
1989	Paattukku Oru Thalaivan	Villager	Tamil	Uncredited roles	
1998	Sollamale	Cobbler	Tamil	Uncredited roles	
2000	Priyamaanavale	Beggar	Tamil	Uncredited roles	
2003	Whistle	Petrol bunk attendant	Tamil		
2008	Kamasutra Nights	Appa	English		
2012	18 Vayasu	Jocky	Tamil		
2021	Jail	Kaveri Nagar resident	Tamil		

=== Short films ===
Year	Film	Role	Ref.
1992	Knock-Out	Sanjeevi's corpse	
2016	Paiththiyam	Beggar	

=== Serials ===
Year	Serial	Role	Channel	Language	Notes	Ref.
2003–2009	Anandham	Ramakrishna	Sun TV	Tamil		
Unknown	Vaishali		Zee Telugu	Telugu		
2004–2006	Chidambara Rahasiyam		Sun TV	Tamil		
2005-2007	En Thozhi En Kaadali En Manaivi		Star Vijay	Tamil		
