= Knock-Out (1992 film) =

Indian Tamil-language short drama film

- Directed by: B. Lenin
- Written by: Devabharathi (dialogues)
- Screenplay by: B. Lenin
- Story by: B. Lenin
- Starring: R. S. Shivaji; S. Sathyendra
- Cinematography: B. Kannan
- Production company: Buddha Pictures
- Release date: 1992
- Running time: 19 minutes
- Country: India
- Language: Tamil

Knock-Out is a 1992 Indian Tamil-language short drama film written and directed by B. Lenin.

== Plot ==
In 1982, a gravedigger buries an unknown man and while clearing his body discovers a gold medal attached to his sacred thread. The corpse is revealed to be that of renown boxer Sanjeevi, who participated in the 1952 Olympics. After many years, a tour guide takes tourists to the memorial made by the government for Sanjeevi, which is inaccurately located and his grave is still exposed.

== Cast ==
- R. S. Shivaji as a vettiyan
- S. Sathyendra as Sanjeevi's corpse
- R. Gunasekaran

== Accolades ==
The film won the National Film Award for Best Debut Film of a Director (non-feature film) and the Islamia Critics Award for Best Short Film at the Cairo International Film Festival. The film was screened at the International Film Festival Rotterdam in 1995.
