= Prasad (2012 film) =

- Theatrical release poster
- Directed by: Manoj Sati
- Screenplay by: Manoj Sati
- Story by: Manoj Sati
- Produced by: Ashok Kheny
- Starring: Arjun Sarja; Madhuri Bhattacharya; Sankalp
- Cinematography: Sanjay Malkar
- Edited by: KK
- Music by: Ilaiyaraaja
- Production company: AKK Entertainment
- Release date: 23 March 2012
- Country: India
- Language: Kannada

Prasad is a 2012 Indian Kannada-language drama film directed by Manoj Sati and produced by Ashok Kheny. The film stars Arjun Sarja, Madhuri Bhattacharya and Sankalp. The film's music was scored by Ilaiyaraaja. The dance choreographer for the movie was Shiamak Davar.

The film released across the Karnataka cinema halls on the auspicious Ugadi festival day on 23 March 2012. The film was screened at the Berlin Film Festival, along with fellow Indian film Don 2.

== Plot ==
Shankar (Arjun) is a mechanic who leads a happy life with his wife Malathi (Madhuri Bhattacharya) and his sister's daughters. Malathi gives birth to a boy named Prasad who is deaf and dumb. Shankar doesn't love his son because he is physically disabled. Malathi finds out that Prasad is talented as a swimmer. Initially, Shankar refuses to come to see the swimming competition but later changes his mind. Shankar understands his son's talent and starts caring for him.

Malathi joins as a deaf and dumb teacher in the school where Prasad studies and Shankar opens a mechanic garage. When Prasad tries to help a blind man cross a road, Prasad gets involved in an accident. In the end, Prasad survives and Shankar starts a foundation in the name of Prasad for the deaf and dumb children.

== Cast ==
- Arjun Sarja as Shankar
- Madhuri Bhattacharya as Malathi
- Sankalp as Prasad
- Ramakrishna
- Ramesh Bhat
- Ninasam Ashwath
- Shama
- Monika
- Rohith Nagesh
- Swathi
- Anjanappa
- Smriti Kulkarni as Nidhi
- Varnika as Shree
- Shiamak Davar in a cameo appearance

== Soundtrack ==
Prasad

Soundtrack album by Ilaiyaraaja, Mano Murthy
- Released: 31 December 2011
- Genre: Feature film soundtrack
- Label: Lahari Music

The soundtrack of Prasad consists of 5 songs composed by Ilaiyaraaja and one song composed by Mano Murthy. Kaviraj, Jayanth Kaikini and V. Nagendra Prasad are the lyricists who have penned the lyrics for the songs.

No.	Title	Lyrics	Music	Singer(s)	Length
1.	"O Nanna Kanda"	V. Nagendra Prasad	Ilaiyaraaja	Karthik	1:08
2.	"Naanu Neenu Kanda Kanasu"	Kaviraj	Ilaiyaraaja	Madhu Balakrishnan, Rita	3:55
3.	"Ondu Aramane"	V. Nagendra Prasad	Ilaiyaraaja	Ilaiyaraaja, Rita, Anitha, Surmukhi Raman	4:50
4.	"O Nanna Amma (Bit)"	Kaviraj	Ilaiyaraaja	Baby Haripriya, Rita	1:45
5.	"O Nanna Kanda (Bit)"	Kaviraj	Ilaiyaraaja	Karthik	1:08
6.	"We Are OK"	Jayanth Kaikini	Mano Murthy	Sonu Nigam	3:32

== Reception ==
=== Critical response ===
Srikanth Srinivasa from Rediff.com scored the film at 3 out of 5 stars and says "Ilayaraja's music is haunting, especially the background score. Mano Murthy has also composed music for a song that shows these special children actually dancing to Shiamak Davar's steps. Parents who are unhappy about having a special child should watch this movie to find out how wrong they are. Director Manoj Sati and his co-director Jagadish Reddy have gone about their job of conveying the message excellently". S. Viswanath from Deccan Herald wrote "What covets you most is melodious music of inimitable maestro Illayaraja. Prasad can be partaken for its meaning and message oriented attempt, even if it’s rather bitter, sweet-sour proffering does may not suit your discerning and demanding palate". A critic from The New Indian Express wrote "Shiamak Davar’s choreography for the songs, especially 'We are Ok' is especially commendable. Rama Krishna too has done complete justice to the supporting role in the film as the protagonists’ well-wisher and friend. Overall, the film is worth watching". A critic from Bangalore Mirror wrote "Arjun has done an average job in a role which his fans may never have expected him to see. Madhuri is watchable because of Sudharani’s voice. The emotion in the film is brought forth by the songs and background score of Ilayaraja. Without his captivating music, the film would have not been half as effective as it is".

== Awards ==
Year	Event	Category	Recipient	Ref.
2011	Karnataka State Film Awards	First Best Film	Ashok Kheny, Manoj K. Sathi	
2011	Karnataka State Film Awards	Best Director	Arjun Sarja	
2011	Karnataka State Film Awards	Best Actor	Arjun Sarja	
2011	Karnataka State Film Awards	Best Child Actor (Male)	Master Sankalp	
