= 2003–04 Karnataka State Film Awards =

Annual Indian film awards ceremony

38th Karnataka State Film Awards
- Awarded for: Best of Kannada Cinema in 2003–04
- Presented by: Dharam Singh (Chief Minister of Karnataka)
- Announced on: 1 January 2005
- Presented on: 16 July 2005
- Site: Bengaluru, Karnataka, India
- Hosted by: Srinivas Prabhu; Aparna

Highlights
- Best Picture: Chigurida Kanasu
- Best Direction: T. S. Nagabharana; Chigurida Kanasu
- Best Actor: Shiva Rajkumar; Chigurida Kanasu
- Best Actress: Radhika; Thayi Illada Thabbali
- Most awards: Chigurida Kanasu (5)

The 2003–04 Karnataka State Film Awards, presented by the Government of Karnataka, recognised the best Kannada-language films released for 2003–04. The awards were announced on 1 January 2005 and presented on 16 July in Ambedkar Bhavan, Bangalore.

== Lifetime achievement award ==
| Name of Award | Awardee(s) | Awarded As | Awards |
|---|---|---|---|
| Dr. Rajkumar Award | K.Janakiram | Director | ₹1,00,000 with a certificate |
| Puttanna Kanagal Award | Pattabhirama Reddy | Director, writer, producer | ₹1,00,000 with a certificate |
| Lifetime Contribution to Kannada Cinema Award | Kuppuswamy Naidu | Producer, Studio Owner | ₹50,000 with a certificate |

== Jury ==
A nine-member committee headed by P. H. Vishwanath, a noted director, made the selections. Of the 26 categories listed, there were no entries for the children and sub-regional sections.

Karnataka government increases the prize money from the existing Rs.20000 to Rs.1 lakh and for the rest of the categories it has been hiked to Rs.50000.

== Film awards ==
| Name of Award | Film | Producer | Director |
|---|---|---|---|
| First Best Film | Chigurida Kanasu | Parvathamma Rajkumar | T. S. Nagabharana |
| Second Best Film | Shanti | Ramesh Yadav | Baraguru Ramachandrappa |
| Third Best Film | Chandra Chakori | H. D. Kumaraswamy | S. Narayan |
| Best Film Of Social Concern | Pravaha | Ramadas Naidu | Ramadas Naidu |

=== Other awards ===
| Name of Award | Film | Awardee(s) |
|---|---|---|
| Best Direction | Chigurida Kanasu | T. S. Nagabharana |
| Best Actor | Chigurida Kanasu | Shiva Rajkumar |
| Best Actress | Thayi Illada Thabbali | Radhika |
| Best Supporting Actor | Mani | Rangayana Raghu |
| Best Supporting Actress | Mani | Umashree |
| Best Child Actor | Amasa | Master Varsha |
| Best Music Direction | Chigurida Kanasu | V. Manohar |
| Best Male Playback Singer | Amasa ("Dodda Gowdara") | Picchalli Srinivas |
| Best Female Playback Singer | Jogula ("Aakashake Obba") | Nanditha |
| Best Cinematography | Chandra Chakori | P. K. H. Das |
| Best Editing | Lankesh Patrike | B. S. Kemparaj |
| Best Lyrics | Preethi Prema Pranaya | K. Kalyan |
| Best Sound Recording | Nanjundi | A R Aravmundan |
| Best Art Direction | Chandra Chakori | G. Murthy |
| Best Story Writer | Mani | Karisubbu |
| Best Screenplay | Preethi Prema Pranaya | Kavitha Lankesh |
| Best Dialogue Writer | Chigurida Kanasu | Jayanth Kaikini |
| Jury's Special Award | Malla | K D Venkatesh (For Stunts) |
