= Krishne Gowda =

Indian actor (1941–2021)

- Born: March 1941
- Died: 25 May 2021 (aged 80)
- Occupation: Actor

Krishne Gowda was an Indian actor and performer.

== Biography ==
=== Early life ===
Gowda was born in March 1941 in Bairasandra, India. He started acting on stage at a very young age. He used to work alongside his father and, before entering the television and film industry, he acted in hundreds of plays. Through his career, Gowda was seen in supporting roles, and largely he did his father's role. His acting in late Vishnuvardhan and Sithara's Halunda Tavaru remains one of his memorable performances.

=== Later life and death ===
He won the State Award for the Best Supporting Actor (Male) for his outstanding performance in Karimaleya Kaggatthalu in 1993. Gowda died on 25 May 2021, due to cardiac arrest.
