= Sridhar (actor) =

Indian actor

- Born: 22 November 1960 (age 66); Bengaluru
- Website: http://www.khechara.com/

Sridhar is an Indian actor in the Kannada film industry, and also a dance scholar, performer and choreographer, trained in Bharatanatyam. He also holds a degree in engineering. Sridhar is married to Anuradha, also a Bharatanatyam dance performer; both have performed for many dance shows as a duo. In 2014, he received Doctorate (D.Lit) for his thesis on the 'Socio-cultural aspects of the Male Dancer in Bharatanatyam' from the Kannada University, Hampi.

== Film career ==
=== Kannada cinema ===
He entered Kannada cinema as a hero in the film Amrutha Ghalige, directed by Puttanna Kanagal. Since then he has acted in more than 65 films and has won many awards for his performances. He has acted in five languages- Kannada, Tamil, Telugu, Malayalam and Hindi.

He won the Karnataka state government's Best Actor Award for his performance as the saint-poet Sharief, in the film Santha Shishunala Sharifa directed by Nagabharana. This film also won the Nargis Dutt award from the Central Government. Bannada Vesha a film directed by Girish Kasaravally, in Kannada won the regional best film award in which he portrayed the character of a Yakshagana artist. He also acted in many devotional films.

=== Other languages ===
K. Balachander gave him a role in his film Manathil Uruthi Vendum, (with Suhasini), even though he has also acted in a supporting role in Aan Paavam. He later acted in several Tamil films, including Poo Pootta Nandavanam (with Sarita) and Mahamaayi (with Shobhana). Sridhar acted in the Malayalam film Manichitrathazhu directed by Fazil. This film won many State Awards and a National film award. He acted opposite Rudra as P. Mahadevan, a poet and professor. He acted as the hero in the Hindi film Bhairavi, directed by Arunaraje Patil. He performed a character role in the Telugu film Swarabhishekam, directed by K. Viswanath. Shridhar became recognized in Telugu television with his performance as Lord Shiva in the classic Telugu serial Shivaleelalu on ETV Telugu.

== Notable filmography ==
=== Kannada films ===
Year	Title	Role	Notes
1984	Amrutha Ghalige	Madhu	
1984	Asha Kirana		
1984	Indina Ramayana		
1984	Preeti Vatsalya		
1984	Bannada Vesha		
1985	Brahma Gantu		
1986	Sundara Swapnagalu		
1986	Hennina Koogu		
1986	Mouna Geethe		
1986	Beegara Pandya		
1987	Manasa Veene		
1987	Satva Pareekshe		
1987	Nyayakke Shikshe		
1987	Jeevana Jyothi		
1987	Bhadrakali		
1988	Bannada Vesha		
1988	Aasphota		
1988	Hrudaya Geethe		
1989	Love Maadi Nodu	Doctor	
1990	Santha Shishunala Sharifa	Shareefa	Karnataka State Film Award for Best Actor
1991	Thavarumane Udugore		
1991	Mangalya		
1992	Bombat Hendthi	Sridhar	
1992	Hatamari Hennu Kiladi Gandu		
1992	Gruhalakshmi		
1993	Jana Machida Maga		
1993	Kollura Sri Mookambika	Lord Shiva	
2008	Budhivanta	David Fernandez	
2012	Katariveera Surasundarangi	Lord Indra	
2012	Kamsale Kaisale		Karnataka State Film Award for Best Supporting Actor
2014	Maha Sharana Haralayya	Haralayya	
2026	Sankeerthana		

=== Other language films ===
Year	Title	Role	Language	Notes
1985	Aan Paavam	Subakaran	Tamil	
1987	Manathil Uruthi Vendum	Surya	Tamil	
1988	Poo Pootha Nandavanam		Tamil	
1989	Pudhea Paadhai	Doctor	Tamil	
1991	Mahamayi		Tamil	
1993	Manichitrathazhu	P. Mahadevan	Malayalam	
1996	Bhairavi	Rajan Swamy	Hindi	
2004	Swarabhishekam	cobbler	Telugu	
2012	Sri Vasavi Vaibhavam	Lord Shiva	Telugu	
2014	Maha Bhakta Siriyala	Lord Shiva	Telugu	

Serials

- Shivaleelalu Shiva Telugu (ETV)
- Sri Bhagavatam - Arjuna Telugu (ETV)
- Sri Raghavendra Mahime - Raghavendra Swamy ( ETV)
- Thiruvilayadal Tamil (Sun TV)
- Brindhavanam Tamil (Sun TV)
- Kayar in Hindi ( DD ) Directed by M.S.Satyu

Tele Films

- Bayalata Hindi (DD) Yakshagana artiste Directed by Nagabharana
- Stone Boy Hindi (DD)
