= Karnataka State Film Award for First Best Film =

Indian film award

Karnataka State Film Award for Best Film
- State award for contributions to Kannada cinema
- Awarded for: Best Film Of The Year
- Sponsored by: Government of Karnataka
- Rewards: Gold Medal; ₹100,000
- First award: 1967-68
- Final award: 2021
- Most recent winner: Doddahatti Boregowda

Highlights
- Total awarded: 56
- First winner: Belli Moda

The Karnataka State Film Award for First Best Film is a Kannada film industry award from the Indian state of Karnataka, given during the annual Karnataka State Film Awards. The award honors Kannada-language films.

== Winners ==
Year	Film(s)	Producer(s)	Director(s)	Refs.
1967-68	Belli Moda	T. N. Srinivasan	Puttanna Kanagal	
1968-69	Hannele Chiguridaga	• Srikanth Nahta • Srikanth Patel	M. R. Vittal	
1969-70	Gejje Pooje	Rashi Brothers	Puttanna Kanagal	
1970-71	Sharapanjara	C. S. Raja	Puttanna Kanagal	
1971-72	Vamsha Vriksha	G. V. Iyer	• B. V. Karanth • Girish Karnad	
1972-73	Sankalpa	P. V. Nanjaraja Urs	P. V. Nanjaraja Urs	
1973-74	Bhootayyana Maga Ayyu	• Siddalingaiah • S. P. Varadappa • N. Veeraswamy • Chandulal Jain	Siddalingaiah	
1974-75	Upasane	Rashi Brothers	Puttanna Kanagal	
1975-76	Chomana Dudi	Ashok Kumar	B. V. Karanth	
1976-77	Pallavi	K. S. Indira Lankesh	P. Lankesh	
1977-78	Ghatashraddha	Sadananda Suvarna	Girish Kasaravalli	
1978-79	Grahana	• D. Ramegowda • D. Venkatesh • D. Shivaram	T. S. Nagabharana	
1979-80	Arivu	K. R. Lalitha	Katte Ramachandra	
1980-81	Ranganayaki	B. Thimmanna	Puttanna Kanagal	
1981-82	Bara	M. S. Sathyu	M. S. Sathyu	
1982-83	Haalu Jenu	Parvathamma Rajkumar	Singeetam Srinivasa Rao	
1983-84	No Award			
1984-85	Accident	Shankar Nag	Shankar Nag	
1985-86	Hosa Neeru	K. S. Sachchidanand	K. V. Jayaram	
1986-87	Tabarana Kathe	Girish Kasaravalli	Girish Kasaravalli	
1987-88	Aasphota	V. Verghese	T. S. Nagabharana	
1988-89	Yaaru Hone	• V. Narasappa • Konda Reddy	N. T. Jayarama Reddy	
1989-90	Kubi Matthu Iyala	Sadananda Suvarna	Sadananda Suvarna	
1990-91	Muthina Haara	S. V. Rajendra Singh Babu	S. V. Rajendra Singh Babu	
1991-92	Veerappan	Chandulal Jain	Ravindranath	
1992-93	Jeevana Chaitra	Parvathamma Rajkumar	Dorai–Bhagwan	
1993-94	Nishkarsha	• Doddagowda C. Patil • G. M. Jayadevappa	Sunil Kumar Desai	
1994-95	Gangavva Gangamaayi	Chandulal Jain	Vasanth Mokashi	
1995-96	Sangeetha Sagara Ganayogi Panchakshara Gavai	Chindodi Leela	Chindodi Bangaresh	
1996-97	America America	G. Nandakumar	Nagathihalli Chandrashekar	
1997-98	Thaayi Saheba	Jayamala	Girish Kasaravalli	
1998-99	Chaitrada Chiguru	Gururaj Seth	K. Shivarudraiah	
1999-2000	Deveeri	• Arathi Gadasalli • Bharathi Gowda • Hanumantha Reddy • Kavitha Lankesh	Kavitha Lankesh	
2000-01	Mussanje	• Beerappa • P. R. Ramadas Naidu	P. R. Ramadas Naidu	
2001-02	Dweepa	Soundarya	Girish Kasaravalli	
2002-03	Artha	• S. V. Shivakumar • Shylaja Nag	B. Suresha	
2003-04	Chigurida Kanasu	Parvathamma Rajkumar	T. S. Nagabharana	
2004-05	Monalisa	• K. S. Dushyanth • K. Santosh Kumar	Indrajit Lankesh	
2005-06	Naayi Neralu	• Abhishek Patil • Basant Kumar Patil	Girish Kasaravalli	
2006-07	Mungaaru Male	E. Krishnappa	Yogaraj Bhat	
2007-08	Gulabi Talkies	• Amrutha Patil • Basant Kumar Patil	Girish Kasaravalli	
2008-09	Kabaddi	• Asha • Kishore Kumar	Narendra Babu	
2009-10	Rasarushi Kuvempu	• Aravind Prakash • Padma Prakash	Rithwik Simha	
2010-11	Maagiya Kaala	Bhagya Moodnakoodu Chinnaswamy	K. Shivarudraiah	
2011	Prasad	Ashok Kheny	Manoj K. Sathi	
2012	Thallana	Thanmaya Chithra	N. Sudarshan	
2013	Hajj	Rajiv Kothary Tallur	Nikhil Manjoo	
2014	Harivu	Avinash U. Shetty	Manjunath Somashekar Reddy	
2015	Thithi	Prathap Reddy	Raam Reddy	
2016	Amaravathi	• E. Sushma • E. Madhava Reddy	B. M. Giriraj	
2017	Shuddhi	• Nandini Madesh • Madesh T. Bhaskar	Adarsh Eshwarappa	
2018	Aa Karaala Ratri	Dayal Padmanabhan	Dayal Padmanabhan	
2019	Mohandas	M/s Mitra Chitra	P. Sheshadri	
2020	Pinki Elli	Picture Tree International	Prithvi Konanur	
2021	Doddahatti Boregowda	Rajarajeshwari Combines	Raghu K. M	

== See also ==
- Karnataka State Film Award for Second Best Film
- Karnataka State Film Award for Third Best Film
- Cinema of India
- Cinema of Karnataka
- List of Kannada-language films
