= T. S. Nagabharana =

Indian filmmaker, theatre personality

T.S. Nagabharana
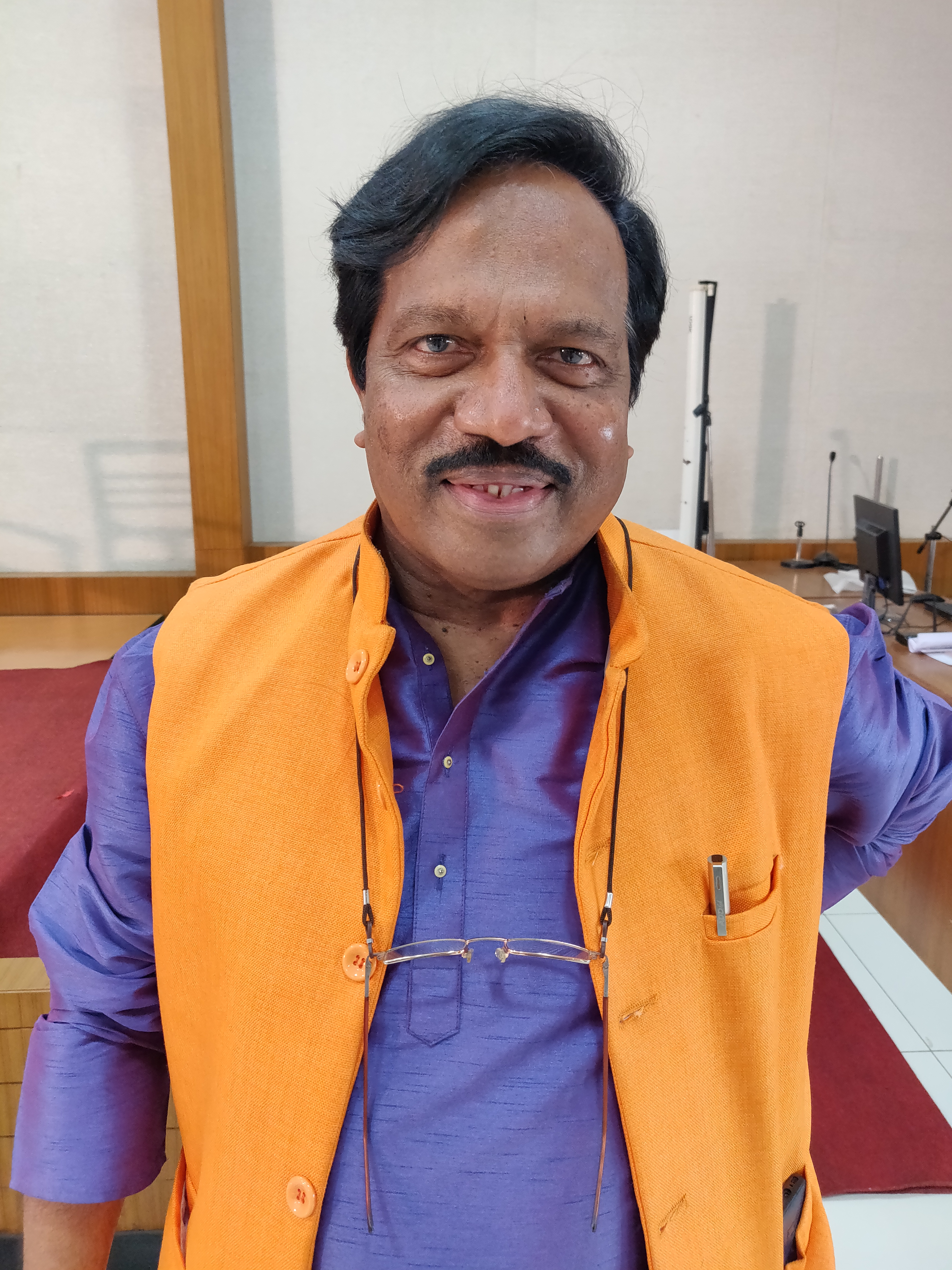
- Born: Talakadu Srinivasaiah Nagabharana; 23 January 1953 (age 73); Talkadu, Mysore District, Karnataka
- Occupations: Film director; producer; screenwriter; actor; theatre worker
- Years active: 1978–present
- Spouse: Naginibharana
- Children: 2, including Pannaga Bharana(son)

Talakadu Srinivasaiah Nagabharana (born 23 January 1953), commonly known as T. S. Nagabharana, is an Indian film director, in the Kannada film industry and a pioneer of parallel cinema. He is one of the few film directors to have straddled the mainstream and parallel cinema worlds.

== Early life ==
T S Nagabharana was born on 23 January 1953 at Talakadu, Mysuru district, Karnataka. He completed his education at a corporation school in Chamarajpet. He has been an administrator for several theater repertories, especially Rangayana, Mysore and Benaka Theatre Group, Bengaluru. He has produced and directed number of serials and other programs for Doordarshan and other channels.

His movie Mysore Mallige was an inspiration for 1942: A Love Story. The core plot of Chigurida Kanasu was an inspiration for Swades. The movie Nagamandala was an inspiration for Paheli. The core plot of Kallarali Hoovagi was an inspiration for the storyline of Bajrangi Bhaijaan.

He has been the recipient of international, national, state and other awards for 20 of his 34 Kannada movies in the last 40 years. He was nominated as the chairman of Karnataka Chalanachitra Academy (KCA), Bangalore [Government of Karnataka] (State Film Academy). Currently he is the Chairman of Kannada Development Authority of Govt of Karnataka.

== Filmography ==
He directed and acted in plays like Sangya Balya, Kathale Belaku, Shakarana Sarotu, Jokumaraswamy, Oedipus, Sattavara Neralu, Krishna Parijata, Tingara Buddanna, Mundena Sakhi Mundena, Hayavadana, Neegikonda Samsa, Baka and Blood Wedding.

He received a gold medal from the Government of India for his achievement in theater. He is the founder of a theater organisation called Benaka. He also started Shruthalaya, an organisation for organising, writing, composing, camera work, lighting, art, acting, editing and directing.

=== As director ===
Year	Film	Notes
1978	Grahana	National Film Awards1978- Nargis Dutt Award for Best Feature Film on National Integration -Best Film on National Integration, National Film Award for Best Screenplay – T S Nagabharana & T S Ranga Karnataka State Film Awards 1978-79 - First Best Film, Best Cinematographer (B&W) – S. Ramachandra; Indian Panorama Entry in International Film Festivals.
1980	Bangarada Jinke	
1982	Anveshane	Karnataka State Film Awards of 1982-83 - Third best film award
1982	Praya Praya Praya	Karnataka State Film Awards – 1982-83 Best Supporting Actress to Mamtha Rao
1983	Banker Margayya	National Film Award for Best Feature Film in Kannada; Based on the 1952 novel The Financial Expert by R. K. Narayan; Karnataka State Film Award – Best Actor – Lokesh. Indian Panorama Entry in International Film Festivals.
1983	Prema Yuddha	
1984	Onti Dwani	
1984	Makkaliralavva Mane Thumba	
1985	Aahuti	
1985	Nethra Pallavi	Not released
1986	Nenapina Dhoni	
1987	Ravana Rajya	
1987	Sedina Sanchu	Also screenplay writer
1987	Aasphota	Karnataka State Film Award for Best Film, Best Supporting Actor – Dattanna. Karnataka State Film Award for Best Screenplay; Filmfare Award for Best Film – Kannada; Based on the novel Ayana by Manu (P. N. Rangan)
1989	Santha Shishunala Sharifa	Nargis Dutt Award for Best Feature Film on National Integration; Karnataka State Film Award – Second Best Film, Best Actor, Best Supporting Actor
1989	Surasundaranga	
1989	Premagni	
1991	Mysore Mallige	National Film Award for Best Feature Film in Kannada; Filmfare Award for Best Director – Kannada; Inspiration for 1942: A Love Story; Karnataka State Film Award – Second Best Film; Indian Panorama Entry in International Film Festivals.
1991	Stone Boy	TV series & Film
1993	Chinnari Mutha	National Film Award for Best Feature Film in Kannada; Karnataka State Film Award – Best Children's Film, Best Music Direction, Best Child Artist, Best Playback Singer Indian Panorama Entry in International Film Festivals.
1993	Aakasmika	Based on Ta Ra Su's trilogy Akasmika - Aparadhi - Parinama; Karnataka State Film Award – Second Best Film Best Kannada Film Filmfare; Also cameo appearance
1994	Sagara Deepa	Based on a novel of the same name by Veerappa Moily
1995	Naviddeve Echarike	Karnataka State Film Award for Best Children Film
1995	Janumada Jodi	Filmfare Award for Best Director – Kannada; Based on the Gujarathi novel Malela Jiva by Pannalal Patel; Karnataka State Film Award – Special Jury Award
1996	Nagamandala	Based on the play of same name by Girish Karnad; Inspiration for Paheli; Karnataka State Film Award- Second Best Film Filmfare – Best Director; Indian Panorama Entry in International Film Festivals.
1997	Vimochane	Also actor, screenwriter
1999	Janumadatha	
2001	Neela	Karnataka State Film Award for Best Film; Indian Panorama Entry in International Film Festivals.
2002	Singaaravva	National Film Award for Best Feature Film in Kannada; Based on the novel Singaravva Mattu Aramane by Chandrashekhara Kambara; Karnataka State Film Award – Best Art Director to Shashidhar Adapa Indian Panorama Entry in International Film Festivals.
2003	Chigurida Kanasu	Karnataka State Film Award for Best Film, Best Director, Best Actor, Best Dialogue, Best Music. Based on the novel of same name by K. Shivaram Karanth; Inspiration for Swades
2006	Kallarali Hoovagi	Nargis Dutt Award for Best Feature Film on National Integration; Based on a novel of the same name by B. L. Venu; Inspiration for Bajrangi Bhaijaan; Karnataka State Film Award – Best Costume, Best Art Direction, Best Editing
2009	Nam Yajamanru	
2012	Kamsale Kaisale	Karnataka State Film Award for Best Children Film
2014	Vasundhara	
2017	Allama	64th National Film Awards - Best Music Direction (songs) — Bapu Padmanabha, Best Music Direction (background score) — Bapu Padmanabha, Best Make-up Artist – N. K. Ramakrishna; Filmfare – Best Actor - Critics Award; Indian Panorama Entry in International Film Festivals.
2018	Kaanoorayana	

=== As actor ===
Year	Film	Role	Notes	Ref.
1977	Tabbaliyu Neenade Magane			
1983	Adi Shankaracharya	Mruthyu		
1985	Accident	Ramanna		
2001	Neela	Doctor		
2008	Mr. Garagasa	Sharath		
2011	Kirataka	Nandisha's father		
2012	Sri Kshetra Adichunchanagiri			
2012	Kamsaale Kaisaale	As father		
2014	Vasundhara			
2014	Jai Lalitha	Srikantaiah		
2016	Uppina Kagada	Aachaari		
2018	KGF: Chapter 1	Srinivas		
2022	KGF: Chapter 2	Srinivas		
2022	Bairagee	Judge		
2023	Tatsama Tadbhava	Vasudev		
2024	Kaalapatthar			
2024	Maryade Prashne	Suresh		
2025	Yuddhakaanda Chapter 2			
2025	Elumale	Mahadevappa		
2026	Surya: The Power of Love	Cop		
2026	Marali Manasaagide			

== Awards and nominations ==
Nagabharana has won nine National and 14 State awards.

Awards and nominations
Award	Wins	Nominations
National Film Awards	8	8
Karnataka State Film Awards	15	15
Filmfare Awards South	7	7

=== National Film Awards ===
List of movies, showing the year (award ceremony), film(s), award(s)
Year	Movie	Award	Refs.
1978 (26th)	Grahana	Best Film on National Integration	
1978 (26th)	Grahana	Best Screenplay	
1983 (31st)	Banker Margayya	Best Feature Film in Kannada	
1989 (37th)	Santha Shishunala Sharifa	Best Film on National Integration	
1991 (39th)	Mysore Mallige	Best Feature Film in Kannada	
1993 (41st)	Chinnari Mutha	Best Feature Film in Kannada	
2002 (50th)	Singaaravva	Best Feature Film in Kannada	
2006 (54th)	Kallarali Hoovagi	Best Film on National Integration	

=== Karnataka State Awards ===
List of movies, showing the year (award ceremony), film(s), award(s)
Year	Movie	Award	Refs.
1978–79	Grahana	Best Film (First)	
1982–83	Anveshane	Best Film (Third)	
1987–88	Aasphota	Best Film (First)	
1987–88	Aasphota	Best Screenplay	
1989–90	Santha Shishunala Sharifa	Best Film (Second)	
1991–92	Mysore Mallige	Best Film (Second)	
1993–94	Aakasmika	Best Film (Second)	
1993–94	Chinnari Mutha	Best Children Film	
1995–96	Naaviddivi Echcharike	Best Children Film	
1996–97	Nagamandala	Best Film (Second)	
1996–97	Janumada Jodi	Special Jury Award	
1998–99	N/A	Puttanna Kanagal Award	
2001–02	Neela	Best Film (Third)	
2003–04	Chigurida Kanasu	Best Film (First)	
2003–04	Chigurida Kanasu	Best Director	
2011	Kamsale Kaisale	Best Children Film	

=== Filmfare Awards South ===
List of movies, showing the year (award ceremony), film(s), award(s)
Year	Movie	Award	Refs.
1988	Aasphota	Best Film – Kannada	
1992	Mysore Mallige	Best Film – Kannada	
1992	Mysore Mallige	Best Director – Kannada	
1993	Aakasmika	Best Film – Kannada	
1996	Janumada Jodi	Best Film – Kannada	
1996	Janumada Jodi	Best Director – Kannada	
1997	Nagamandala	Best Director – Kannada	

=== Others ===
- Dhwani- Sriranga international Kannada theatre award for 2009 by Dhwani Pratishthana
- 2023 – Jury Chairperson at the 54th International Film Festival of India for Indian Panorama Feature Films section.
