= Kamsale Kaisale =

- Directed by: T. S. Nagabharana
- Written by: T. S. Nagabharana
- Screenplay by: T. S. Nagabharana
- Produced by: Mahesh Nanjaiah; Nagini Bharana
- Starring: Master Snehith; Shridhar
- Music by: K. Kalyan
- Production company: Shruthaalaya Pictures
- Release date: 9 November 2012 (Karnataka)
- Running time: 90 Minutes
- Country: India
- Language: Kannada

Kamsale Kaisale (ಕಂಸಾಳೆ ಕೈಸಾಳೆ) is a 2012 Kannada language children's film directed by T. S. Nagabharana.

== Cast ==
- Master Snehith as Madhav
- Master Vasuki Vaibhav
- Sridhar
- T. S. Nagabharana as Ranganatha
- Deeraj R.
- Shanthamma
- Amulya

== Reception ==
=== Critical response ===
B S Srivani from Deccan Herald wrote "Another hero of the film is cinematographer Anant Urs whose camera brings alive Mahadeshwara Betta, Biligiri Rangana Betta and surrounding areas. The climax seems abrupt but the entire journey more than makes up for the disappointment". A critic from Bangalore Mirror wrote "While Ananth Urs’s Cinematography adds colour to the film, songs continue to lull in your ears even after coming out of theatre".

== Awards and nominations ==
- The film won the Karnataka State Film Award for Best Children Film.
- Snehith was nominated at the Bangalore Times Film Awards for the Best Child Artist.
