= Karnataka State Film Awards =

Film awards

- State award for contributions to film
- Awarded for: Highest award for films in Karnataka
- Sponsored by: Government of Karnataka
- Formerly called: Mysore State Film Awards
- First award: 1966-67
- Final award: 2021

List of movies with most awards
- Movie and Year: No. of Awards won
Naagarahaavu (1972)	8
Belli Moda (1967)	7
Minchina Ota (1979)	7
Vamsha Vriksha (1971)	6
Sankalpa (1972)	6
Upasane (1974)	6
Chomana Dudi (1975)	6
Masanada Hoovu (1985)	6
Tabarana Kathe (1986)	6
Aathanka (1992)	6
Janumada Jodi (1996)	6
Thaayi Saheba (1997)	6
Munnudi (2000)	6
Mungaru Male (2006)	6

Karnataka State Film Awards are the most notable and prestigious film awards given for Kannada film industry in Karnataka, India. These are considered the highest awards for Kannada language films. They are given annually by the Government of Karnataka to honor the best talent and to provide encouragement and incentive to the Kannada film industry.

The awards are decided by a committee, headed by a panel of judges. The jury usually consists of eminent film personalities. The awards intend to promote films with artistic value and encourage artists, technicians and producers. The awards are declared by the Minister for Cultural Affairs and are presented by the Chief Minister of Karnataka.

On 14 November 2016,Chief Minister of Karnataka Siddaramaiah declared that the State Government will present the Karnataka State Film Awards on 24 April, the birthday of thespian Dr. Rajkumar, every year henceforth.

== List of awards ==
=== Creative awards ===
- First Best Film
- Second Best Film
- Third Best Film
- Fourth Best Film
- Best Social Film
- Best Children Film
- Best Regional Film
- Best Family Entertainer
- Best Debut Film of New Director
- Best Director
- Best Actor
- Best Actress
- Best Supporting Actor
- Best Supporting Actress
- Best Child Actor (Male)
- Best Child Actor (Female)
- Best Music Director
- Best Male Playback Singer
- Best Female Playback Singer
- Best Dubbing Artist (Male)
- Best Dubbing Artist (Female)

=== Technical awards ===
- Best Cinematographer
- Best Editor
- Best Lyricist
- Best Sound Recorder
- Best Art Direction
- Best Story
- Best Screenplay
- Best Dialogue

=== Special awards ===
- Lifetime Contribution to Kannada Cinema Award
- Jury's Special Award
- Best Book on Kannada Cinema
- Best Short Film

=== Honorary awards ===
- Puttanna Kanagal Award
- Dr. Rajkumar Award
- Dr. Vishnuvardhan Award

== Jury ==
Year	Chairperson	Designation
1967-68		
1968-69		
1969-70		
1970-71		
1971-72		
1972-73		
1973-74		
1974-75		
1975-76		
1976-77		
1977-78		
1978-79		
1979-80		
1980-81		
1981-82		
1982-83		
1983-84		
1984-85		
1985-86	B. Saroja Devi	Actress
1986-87		
1987-88		
1988-89		
1989-90		
1990–91		
1991–92		
1992-93		
1993–94	S. Siddalingaiah	Director
1994-95	Girish Kasaravalli	Director
1995-96		
1996-97	G. V. Iyer	Director, producer
1997–98	Geethapriya	Director, lyricist
1998-99		
1999-2000	Jaimala	Actress, producer
2000-01	M. S. Sathyu	Director
2001-02	U. S. Vadiraj	Producer, director, actor
2002-03	K. M. Shankarappa	Director
2003-04	P. H. Vishwanath	Director
2004-05	Kodalli Shivaram	Producer
2005-06	T. N. Seetharam	Director
2006-07	Nagathihalli Chandrashekhar	Director, lyricist
2007-08	Kesari Harvoo	Director
2008-09	H. R. Bhargava	Director
2009-10	B. S. Dwarakish	Actor, producer, director
2010-11	S. K. Bhagwan	Director
2011	Sunil Kumar Desai	Director
2012	K. C. N. Chandrashekhar	Producer
2013	G. K. Govinda Rao	Thinker, writer, actor
2014	K. Shivarudraiah	Director
2015	Naganna	Director
2016	Kavitha Lankesh	Director
2017	N. S. Shankar	Director, writer
2018	Joe Simon	Director
2019	N. R. Nanjunde Gowda	Director
2020	B. S. Lingadevaru	Director
2021	Sadashiva Shenoy	Journalist

== See also ==
- Cinema of India
- Cinema of Karnataka
- List of Kannada-language films
