= B. R. Chaya =

Indian playback singer

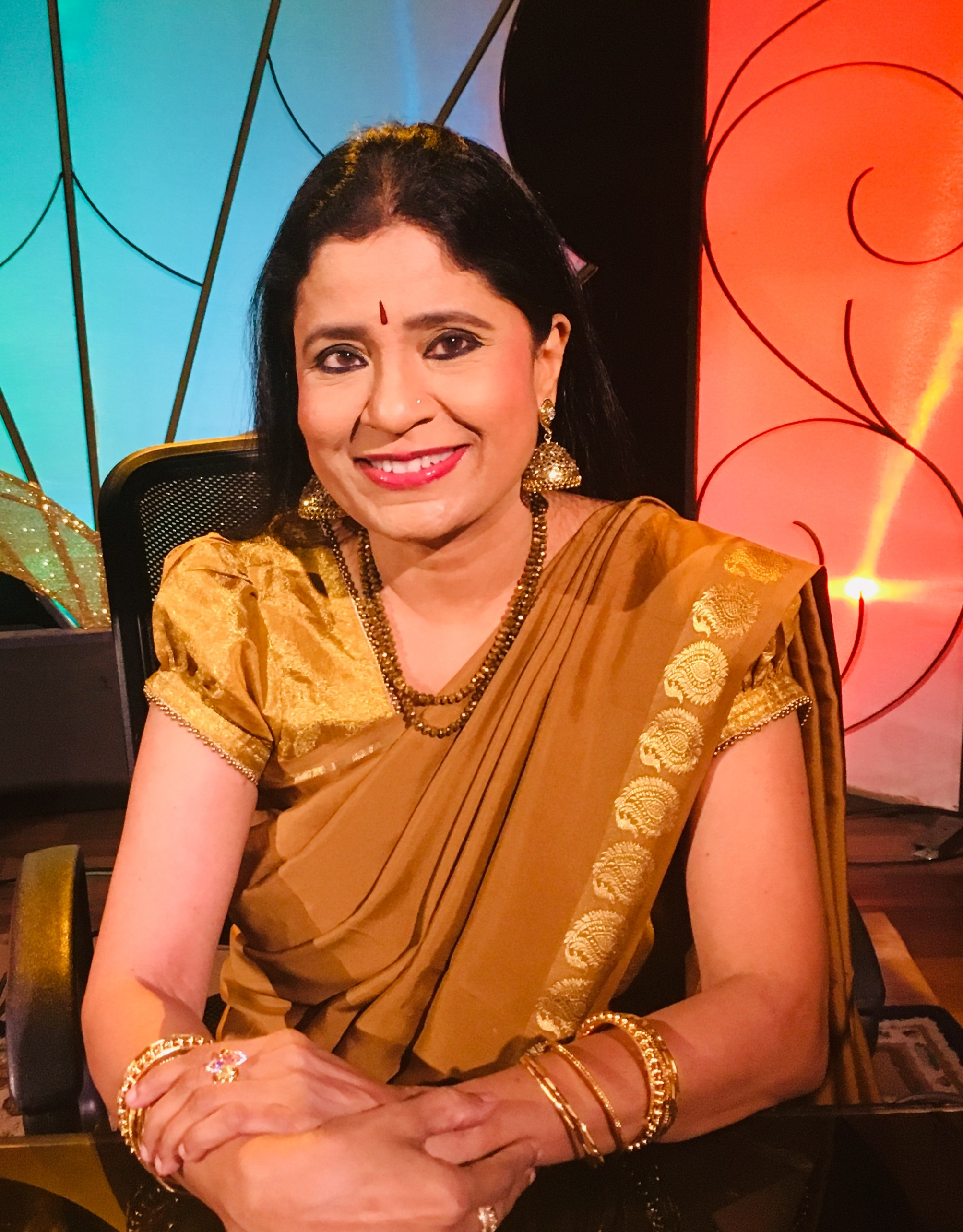
- Chaya in 2019

Background information
- Born: 16 October 1969 (age 57); Bengaluru, Karnataka, India
- Genres: Sugama Sangeetha, playback
- Occupations: Singer, entrepreneur
- Instrument: Vocals
- Years active: 1983–present
- Website: brchaya.com

Bengaluru Ramamurthy Chaya, known as B. R. Chaya, is an Indian, Kannada playback singer, stage performer and a popular Sugama Sangeetha singer from Karnataka. She has performed pop, folk, devotional and bhavageethe (light music). She has more than 10000 songs to her credit. She is recipient of Rajyotsava Prashasti from the State Government of Karnataka and also Karnataka State Film Award for Best Female Playback Singer .

== Early days and debut ==
Chaya was born to Ramamurthy and Janaki. she worked as a watch mechanic for a few years in HMT after doing a course in horology at RV College, and later represented Karnataka at a Doordarshan national competition in Madras. She made her debut with the Tamil-language film Jothi (1983) and her Kannada debut with Puttanna Kanagal's Amrutha Ghalige (1984).

Chaya, who was from the Indian state of Karnataka, developed an interest in music during childhood. She was described as a child prodigy because of her extensive knowledge of music.

Chaya was initially noticed by the south Indian musical maestro Ilaiyaraaja who made her sing quite a few tracks for his Tamil and Telugu films. But she got a big break in her first Kannada film recording with music director Vijaya Bhaskar for the film Amrutha Ghalige. The song "Hindustanavu Endoo Mareyada" for this film became a huge hit and Chaya got instant recognition and accolades. She refers to Vijaya Bhaskar as her Guru.

Chaya continued to sing many popular songs in films and also branched out to sing hundreds of songs for private albums. She recorded many duet songs with all the veterans of her time like M. Balamurali Krishna, P. B. Sreenivas, K. J. Yesudas and S. P. Balasubramanyam. She worked under many music composers like Rajan-Nagendra, Vijaya Bhaskar, Upendra Kumar, M. Ranga Rao, Hamsalekha, V. Manohar, C.Ashwath, H.K.Narayan among others.

In the latter part of her career, she has performed for the Kannada Associations of United States of America (all most all major cities of USA), Australia, New Zealand, Baharain, Dubai, Singapore on their invitations.

She is currently a judge on Gaana Chandana and has been doing concerts all over the world.

Chaya is the first singer to receive the Karnataka State Film Award for Best Female Playback Singer for the song "Ruthumana samputadi" from the movie "Kaadina Benki" in 1988.

== Discography (Selected) ==
Year	Film	Song	Composer(s)	Writer(s)	Co-singer(s)
1983	Jothi (Tamil)	"Siricha Kollimalai Kuyilu"	Ilaiyaraaja	Vairamuthu	S. P. Balasubrahmanyam
1984	Amrutha Ghalige	"Mayuri Natya Mayuri"	Vijaya Bhaskar	Vijaya Narasimha	S. P. Balasubrahmanyam
1984	Amrutha Ghalige	"Parvathi Parashivana"	Vijaya Bhaskar	Vijaya Narasimha	S. P. Balasubrahmanyam
1984	Amrutha Ghalige	"Hindustanavu Endu (female)"	Vijaya Bhaskar	Vijaya Narasimha	solo
1985	Nee Thanda Kanike	"Kannalli Preethi" (female)	Vijayanand	R. N. Jayagopal	solo
1985	Nee Thanda Kanike	"Kannalli Preethi" (duet)	Vijayanand	R. N. Jayagopal	S. P. Balasubrahmanyam
1986	Bhagyada Lakshmi Baramma	"Nee Atthare Entha Chenna"	Singeetham Srinivasa Rao	Chi. Udaya Shankar	Rajkumar
1987	Huli Hebbuli	"Putta Putta Makkale"	Vijaya Bhaskar	Chi. Udaya Shankar	S. P. Balasubrahmanyam
1987	Yarigagi	"Nota Kannota"	G. K. Venkatesh	Doddarange Gowda	solo
1988	Anjada Gandu	"Neeli Baanalli"	Hamsalekha	R. N. Jayagopal	solo
1988	Anjada Gandu	"Eke Heegaytho"	Hamsalekha	R. N. Jayagopal	S. P. Balasubrahmanyam
1988	Anjada Gandu	"Dumdum Dol"	Hamsalekha	R. N. Jayagopal	S. P. Balasubrahmanyam
1988	Devatha Manushya	"Ninantha Appa Illa"	Upendra Kumar	Chi. Udaya Shankar	Rajkumar
1988	Devatha Manushya	"Haalalladaru" (bit.)	Upendra Kumar	Chi. Udaya Shankar	solo
1988	Sangliyana	"Preethiyinda"	Hansalekha	Doddarange Gowda	S. P. Balasubrahmanyam, B. R. Chaya
1989	Indrajith	"Belli Rathadali Surya"	Hamsalekha	Hamsalekha, KV Raju	S. P. Balasubrahmanyam
1989	Yuddha Kaanda	"Kempu Thotadalli"	Hamsalekha	Hamsalekha	Vani Jairam, S. P. Balasubrahmanyam
1989	Yuddha Kaanda	"Bolo Re Shanthi"	Hamsalekha	Hamsalekha	solo
1990	S. P. Sangliyana Part 2	"Ramaiah Ramaiah Nee	Hamsalekha	Hamsalekha	Manjula Gururaj, Latha Hamsalekha
1992	Undu Hoda Kondu Hoda	"Bandano Bandano Bhagyava Thandano"	Vijaya Bhaskar	Nagathihalli Chandrashekar	Vishnu

== Awards and recognitions ==
- 2010 – Karnataka Rajyotsava Prashasti
- 1988 – Karnataka State Film Award for Best Female Playback Singer – Song: Ruthumana samputadi from Kaadina Benki
- 1995 – Karnataka State Film Award for Best Female Playback Singer – Song: Ibbani tabbida ileyali from Rashmi
