= Karnataka State Film Award for Best Supporting Actor =

Indian film award

- State award for contributions to Kannada cinema
- Awarded for: Best Performance by an Actor in Supporting Role
- Sponsored by: Government of Karnataka
- Rewards: Silver Medal; ₹ 20,000
- First award: 1967-68
- Final award: 2021
- Most recent winner: Pramod Panju

Highlights
- Total awarded: 53
- First winner: Udaykumar

Karnataka State Film Award for Best Supporting Actor is a film award of the Indian state of Karnataka given during the annual Karnataka State Film Awards. The award honours Kannada-language films.

== Superlative winners ==
• K. S. Ashwath	3 Awards

== Award winners ==
The following is a partial list of award winners and the films for which they won.

Year	Image	Winner	Role	Film	Ref(s)
2021	–	Pramod Panju	Udaal Babu Rao	Rathnan Prapancha	
2020	–	Ramesh Pandit	Jademaada	Taledanda	
2019		Tabla Nani	Kariappa	Chemistry of Kariappa	
2018	–	Balaji Manohar	Seena	Churikatte	
2017	–	Manjunath Hegde	Narayana	Lakshmi Narayanara Prapanchane Bere	
2016	–	Naveen D. Padil		Kudla Cafe (Tulu Movie)	
2015		Ramesh Bhat		Mana Manthana	
2014	–	Arun Devasia		Nayakanahatti Sri Thipperudraswami Mahathme	
2013	–	Sharath Lohitashwa	Rajegowda	Matthe Satyagraha	
2012	–	Kari Subbu		Kalavu	
2011	–	Shridhar	Maadayya	Kamsale Kaisale	
2010-11		Achyuth Kumar	Kodanda	Hejjegalu	
2009-10	–	Neenasam Ashwath	Yellappa	Banni	
2008-09	–	M. K. Mata Uppinangadi		Gaggara (Tulu Movie)	
2007-08	–	Rajesh Nataranga	Raghavendra	Moggina Jade	
2006-07		Rangayana Raghu	Sathyanna	Duniya	
2005-06		Jaggesh	Venkatesh / Upakathe Govindu	Mata	
2004-05		Kishore	Shabbir	Rakshasa	
2003-04		Rangayana Raghu	Chaami	Mani	
2002-03		Komal Kumar	Nandeesha	Thavarige Baa Thangi	
2001-02	–	Keremane Shambhu Hegde	Seetharama Shastry	Parva	
2000-01		Avinash	Puttathammayya	Mathadana	
1999-2000	–	Srinivasa Murthy	Ramachandra Rao	Shrirasthu Shubhamasthu	
1998-89		Doddanna	Peter Breganzha	Tuvvi Tuvvi Tuvvi	
1997-98	–	S. Shivaram	Venkob Rao	Thaayi Saheba	
1996-97		Mandya Ramesh	Kappanna	Nagamandala	
1995-96		Girish Karnad	Hanagal Kumaraswamiji	Sangeetha Sagara Ganayogi Panchakshara Gavai	
1994-95	–	Karibasavaiah	Dibba	Kotreshi Kanasu	
1993-94	–	Krishne Gowda	Narasimhayya	Karimaleya Kaggatthalu	
1992-93	–	H. G. Somashekara Rao	Rudrappa	Harakeya Kuri	
1991-92	–	Udaya Maheshwar		Pathitha Pavani	
1990-91	–	K. S. Ashwath	Belliyappa	Muthina Haara	
1989-90		Girish Karnad	Guru Govinda Bhatta	Santha Shishunala Sharifa	
1988-89	–	Mysore Lokesh	Ezhumalai	Prajegalu Prabhugalu	
1987-88		H. G. Dattatreya	Srinivasayya	Aasphota	
1986-87		Devaraj	Chandru	Aaganthuka	
1985-86		Ambareesh	Singaru	Masanada Hoovu	
1984-85	–	Shyamsundar		Avala Antharanga	
1983-84	–	Aravind	Manjayya Seregara	Anubhava	
1982-83	–	Vajramuni		Betthale Seve	
1981-82	–	Srinivasa Murthy		Naari Swargakke Daari	
1980-81		Ramakrishna	Shekhar	Ranganayaki	
1979-80	–	Lokanath	Prabhakar Rao / Thaatha	Minchina Ota	
1978-79	–	Sundar Krishna Urs	Peramadi	Ondanondu Kaladalli	
1977-78		Udaykumar	Ramanna Perumal	Hemavathi	
1976-77	–	Natesan Rathna	Gowda	Rishya Shringa	
1975-76		Master Umesh	Thimmarayi	Katha Sangama	
1974-75	–	H. B. Yajaman		Kankana	
1973-74	–	Ranga	Kumar	Edakallu Guddada Mele	
1972-73	–	K. S. Ashwath	Chamayya	Naagarahaavu	
1971-72		T. N. Balakrishna	Rachutappa	Bangarada Manushya	
1970-71	–	B. R. Jayaram		Samskara	
1969-70	–	Ranga	Honna	Punarjanma	
1968-69	–	K. S. Ashwath	Srinivasayya	Namma Makkalu	
1967-68		Udaykumar	Kashipathayya	Chakra Theertha	

== See also ==
- Cinema of Karnataka
- List of Kannada-language films
