= Karnataka State Film Award for Best Female Playback Singer =

State film award of the Indian state

- State award for contributions to Kannada cinema
- Awarded for: Best Female Playback Singer of a Song
- Sponsored by: Government of Karnataka
- Rewards: Silver Medal; ₹ 20,000
- First award: 1988-89
- Final award: 2021
- Most recent winner: Sahana M. Bharadwaj

Highlights
- Total awarded: 29
- First winner: B. R. Chaya

Karnataka State Film Award for Best Female Playback Singer is a film award of the Indian state of Karnataka given during the annual Karnataka State Film Awards. The award honours female singers for their work in Kannada language films.

== Superlative winners ==
• B. R. Chaya	2 Awards
• K. S. Chithra	3 Awards
• Nanditha	4 Awards

== Award winners ==
The following is a complete list of award winners and the name of the films for which they won.

Year	Image	Recipient(s)	Film	Song	Ref
2021	–	Sahana M. Bharadwaj	Dandi	"Mugile Mathadu"	
2020	–	Arundhati Vasishta	Danthapurana		
2019		Jayadevi Jangamashetti	Raga Bhairavi	All songs	
2018	–	Kalavati Dayanand	Deyi Baidethi	"Gejje Giri Nandana"	
2017	–	Apoorva Sridhar	Dayavittu Gamanisi	"Asadullah Daadi Bitta"	
2016	–	Sangeetha Ravindranath	Jalsa	"Nannede Beedige"	
2015		Shamitha Malnad	Bekku	"Thalamalada Maleyalli"	
2014	–	Vidya Mohan	Sachin! Tendulkar Alla	"Kanne Illada Mele"	
2013	–	Sachina Heggar	Kaddipudi	"Hederabyadree"	
2012		Anuradha Bhat	Little Master	Jnaanajyothi	
2011		Archana Udupa	Bhageerathi	"Beru Ondu Kade"	
2010-11	–	Sriraksha Priyaram	Ondooralli	"Hadedaru Devaki Padedu Yashoda"	
2009-10	–	Lakshmi Nataraj	Aaptha Rakshaka	"Omkara"	
2008-09		Nanditha	Mandaakini	"Baanige Bhaskara Chanda"	
2007-08	–	Vaani Harikrishna	Inthi Ninna Preethiya	"Madhuvana Karedare"	
2006-07		M. D. Pallavi Arun	Duniya	"Nodayya Kvaate Lingave"	
2005-06		Chaitra H. G.	Amrithadhare	"Huduga Huduga"	
2004-05		K. S. Chithra	Maharaja	"Kandamma Kandamma"	
2003-04		Nanditha	Jogula	"Aakashake Obba"	
2002-03		Nanditha	Paris Pranaya	"Ede Tumbi Hadidenu"	
2001-02		Nanditha	Gandhada Gombe	"Bili Bannada Gini"	
2000-01		K. S. Chithra	Gatti Mela	"Navileno Kunibeku"	
1999-2000		Latha Hamsalekha	Arunodaya	"Aaha Arunodaya"	
1998-99		Anuradha Sriram	Hrudayanjali	"Omkara Naadamaya"	
1997-98		M. S. Sheela	Vimochane	"Girija Suthanu"	
1996-97		K. S. Chithra	Nammoora Mandara Hoove	"Hele Kogile Impaagala"	
1995-96		Chandrika Gururaj	Urvashi	"O Priyathama"	
1994-95		B. R. Chaya	Rashmi	"Ibbani Tabbida"	
1993-94		Manjula Gururaj	Chinnari Mutha	"Myale Kavkonda"	
1988-89		B. R. Chaya	Kaadina Benki	"Ruthumaana Samputadi"	

== See also ==
- Cinema of Karnataka
- List of Kannada-language films
