= Karnataka State Film Award for Best Children Film =

Indian film award

Karnataka State Film Award for Best Film about Children
- State award for contributions to Kannada cinema
- Awarded for: Best Film about Children
- Sponsored by: Government of Karnataka
- Rewards: Silver Medal; ₹ 50,000
- First award: 1993-94
- Final award: 2021
- Most recent winner: Cake

Highlights
- Total awarded: 22
- First winner: Chinnari Mutha

Karnataka State Film Award for Best Children Film is a film award of the Indian state of Karnataka given during the annual Karnataka State Film Awards. The award honors Kannada-language films in the category.

== Award winners ==
The following is a list of award winners and the films for which they won.

Year	Film	Producer	Director	Ref.
2021	Cake	Parikshit Ishwar	Kishore Moodbidri	
2020	Padaka	Aditya R. Chiranjeevi	Aditya R. Chiranjeevi	
2019	Elli Aadodu Naavu Elli Aadodu	Srinivas	G. Arun Kumar	
2018	Hoovu-Balli	Chandrika Films	B. Manjunath	
2017	Eleyaru Naavu Geleyaru	Nagaraj Gopal	Vikram Soori	
2016	Jeerjimbe	Pushkara Mallikarjunaiah Karthik Saragur	Karthik Saragur	
2015	Maneye Modala Paatashaale	N. T. Jayarama Reddy	N. T. Jayarama Reddy	
2014	Baanaadi	Dhruthi Nagaraj	Nagaraj Kote	
2013	Haadu Hakki Haadu		Nagendra Shah	
2012	Little Master			
2011	Kamsale Kaisale	• Nagini Bharana • Mahesh Nanjaiah	T. S. Nagabharana	
2010-11	Ondooralli		Nikhil Manjoo	
2009-10	Kinnara Baale	Everest India	P. H. Vishwanath	
2009-10	Gurukula		Sunil Puranik	
2008-09	Chaitanya		Shivaram Krishna	
2007-08	Ekalavya	Abhiruchi Chitra	Baraguru Ramachandrappa	
2006-07	No Award			
2005-06	Thutturi	Jayamala H. M. Ramachandra	P. Sheshadri	
2004-05	Mithayi Mane		Aarathi	
2003-04	No Award			
2002-03	Kalarava		P. R. Thimmaraju	
2001-02	Putti	Messes Medhajith Creations	B. R. Keshav	
2000-01	No Award			
1999-2000	No Award			
1998-99	No Award			
1997-98	No Award			
1996-97	Vyuha	P. Lakshmi Bai	G. Mohan Menon	
1995-96	Naaviddivi Echcharike		T. S. Nagabharana	
1994-95	No Award			
1993-94	Chinnari Mutha	• Saroja • Nagini Bharana • G. Nandakumar	T. S. Nagabharana	

== See also ==
- Cinema of Karnataka
- List of Kannada-language films
