= Karnataka State Film Award (Special Jury Award) =

List of award winners

This is the list of winners of Jury's Special Award at Karnataka State Film Awards.

Year	Awardee	Awarded For	Film	Ref
1977-78	Baby Madhavi	Acting	Sanaadi Appanna	
1978-79	M. S. Sathyu	Film	Chithegu Chinthe	
1979-80	Komal Productions	Film	Dangeyedda Makkalu	
1980-81	Panchacharya Films	Film	Kithapathi	
1981-82	Ambareesh	Acting	Antha	
1981-82	Doddarange Gowda	Lyrics	Aalemane	
1981-82	–	Regional Film	Bhagyavanthedi	
1982-83	–	Film	Shrungara Maasa	
1983-84	Siddalingaiah	Lyrics	Dharani Mandala Madhyadolage	
1984-85	Kanchana Ganga Films	Film	Beralge Koral	
1984-85	Hassan Raghu	Stunts	Accident	
1985-86	R. N. Jayagopal	Lyrics	Swabhimana	
1985-86	Arun Godgaonkar	Art Direction	Masanada Hoovu	
1985-86	Mallesh Harthi	Make-up	Thulasidala	
1985-86	Mahavishnu Enterprises	Technology	Thulasidala	
1986-87	N. S. Rao	Acting	–	
1987-88	Singeetam Srinivasa Rao	Film	Pushpaka Vimana	
1987-88	Puttur Narasimha Nayak	Playback Singing	Kendada Male	
1987-88	B. R. Chaya	Playback Singing	Kaadina Benki	
1988-89	Baraguru Ramachandrappa	Lyrics	Kote	
1989-90	Girish Kasaravalli	Film	Mane	
1990-91	Doddarange Gowda	Lyrics	Ganeshana Maduve	
1991-92	–	Technology	Shanti Kranti	
1992-93	–	Regional Film	Bangar Patler	
1993-94	Vaibhava Lakshmi Productions	Film	Hoovu Hannu	
1994-95	Thriller Manju	Stunts	Lockup Death	
1995-96	Manjula Gururaj	Voice Dubbing	Beladingala Baale	
1996-97	–	Film	Janumada Jodi	
1997-98	Sanketh Kashi	Acting	Ulta Palta	
1997-98	Janardhan	Playback Singing	Nodu Baa Nammoora	
1998-99	–	Film	Veerappa Nayaka	
1999-2000	–	Novel Techniques	AK 47	
2000-01	• Zubeida • Anupama Sheshadri	Costume Designer	Munnudi	
2001-02	Prakash	Technology Incorporation	Neelambari	
2002-03	–	Technology Adaptation	Hollywood	
2003-04	K. D. Venkatesh	Stunts	Malla	
2004-05	Mutturaj	Costume Design	Kanchana Ganga	
2005-06	–	Film	Dr. B. R. Ambedkar	
2005-06	–	Film	C/o Footpath	
2006-07	Dhruva Sharma	Hearing and Speech Impaired	Snehanjali	
2006-07	• Nagini Bharana • Roshini	Costume Design	Kallarali Hoovagi	
2006-07	Aneka Creations	Film	Daatu	
2008-09	Ravi Varma	Stunts		
2009-10	D. Sumana Kittur	Direction	Kallara Santhe	
2010-11	–	Technical Innovation	Super	
2011	Rajan	Special Effects	Saarathi	
2012	Ravi Varma	Stunts	Krantiveera Sangolli Rayanna	
2014	Jyothiraj	Stunts	Jothi Alias Kothiraj	
2015	Jupiter Animations	Graphics	Shivalinga	
2016	Chinmay	Costume Design	Santheyalli Nintha Kabira	
2016	K. V. Manjaiah	Production Managing	Mungaru Male 2	
2017	Mithra	Acting	Raaga	
2017	Sridarshan	Acting	Mahakavya	
2017	Suresh K. Mysore	Production Managing	Hebbuli	
2018	H. Anantharayappa	Film	Samanatheya Kadege	
2018	V. Thomas	Production Managing	Abbetumakura Siddhipurusha Vishwaradhyaru	
2019	Baraguru Ramachandrappa	Film	Amruthamathi	
2019	Balaji Chitra	Film	Thamate Narasimhaiah	
2020	Sanchari Vijay	Acting	-	

== See also ==
- Karnataka State Film Awards
