= Karnataka State Film Award for Best Cinematographer =

Indian film award

- State award for contributions to Kannada cinema
- Awarded for: Best Cinematographer who captures the movie effectively
- Sponsored by: Government of Karnataka
- Rewards: Silver Medal; ₹ 20,000
- First award: 1967-68
- Final award: 2021
- Most recent winner: Bhuvanesh Prabhu

Highlights
- Total awarded: 53
- First winner: R. N. K. Prasad

Karnataka State Film Award for Best Cinematographer is a state film award of the Indian state of Karnataka given during the annual Karnataka State Film Awards. The award honors Kannada language films.

== Superlative winners ==
• R. N. K. Prasad • S. V. Srikanth • D. V. Rajaram • H. M. Ramachandra • G. S. Bhaskar	3 Awards
• S. Ramachandra • B. C. Gowrishankar	4 Awards

‡ indicates one Awardee for different films.

== Award winners ==
The following is a partial list of award winners and the films for which they won.

Awards legends
	Black & White Cinematography
	Color Cinematography
†	Indicates a joint award for that year

Year	Winner	Film
2021	Bhuvanesh Prabhu	Amme Samsara (Konkani language)
2020	Ashok Kashyap	Taledanda
2019	G. S. Bhaskar	Mohandas
2018	Naveen Kumar I	Ammachi Yemba Kanasu
2017	Santosh Rai Pathaje	Chamak
2016	Shekhar Chandru	Mungaru Male 2
2015	Ananth Arasu	Last Bus
2014	Satya Hegde	Raate
2013	P. K. H. Das	Chandra
2012	Rakesh	Edegarike
2011	G. S. Bhaskar	Koormavatara
2010-11	B. L. Babu	Ondooralli
2009-10	K. Sundarnath Suvarna	Kallara Santhe
2008-09	K. M. Vishnu Vardhan	Neenyare
2007-08	H. C. Venugopal	Aa Dinagalu
2006-07	S. Krishna	Mungaru Male
2005-06	H. M. Ramachandra	Nenapirali
2004-05	H. C. Venugopal	Encounter Dayanayak
2003-04	P. K. H. Das	Chandra Chakori
2002-03	Nagaraj Adavani	Kshaama
2001-02	H. M. Ramachandra	Dweepa
2000-01	Ashok Kashyap	Shaapa
1999-2000	J.G. Krishna	Nannaseya Hoove
1998-99	D. V. Rajaram	Doni Sagali
1997-98	H. M. Ramachandra	Thaayi Saheba
1996-97	G. S. Bhaskar	Nagamandala
1995-96	B. C. Gowrishankar	Om
1994-95	R. Manjunath	Aragini
1993-94	Mallikarjuna	Gandhada Gudi Part 2
1992-93	Johny Lal	Aathanka
1991-92	B. C. Gowrishankar	Mysore Mallige
1990-91	D. V. Rajaram	Muthina Haara
1989-90	S. Ramachandra	Mane
1988-89	Dinesh Baboo	Suprabhatha
1987-88	N. Chandra	Shivayogi Akkamahadevi
1986-87	S. R. Bhat	Surya
1985-86 †	S. Maruthi Rao	Masanada Hoovu
1985-86 †	B. C. Gowrishankar	Dhruva Thare
1984-85	R. N. K. Prasad	Avala Antharanga
1983-84	B. S. Basavaraj	Amrutha Ghalige
1982-83	Balu Mahendra	Pallavi Anupallavi
1981-82	P. S. Prakash	Antha
1980-81 †	R. N. K. Prasad	Mareyada Haadu
1980-81 †	S. R. Bhat	Mooru Daarigalu
1979-80 ‡	B. C. Gowrishankar	Minchina Ota; Arivu
1978-79 †	S. Ramachandra	Grahana
1978-79 †	Barun Mukherjee	Savithri
1977-78	B. C. Gowrishankar	Spandana
1976-77	S. Ramachandra	Rishya Shringa
1975-76	Nemai Ghosh	Hamsageethe
1974-75	S. V. Srikanth	Upasane
1973-74 †	U. M. N. Sharief	Maadi Madidavaru
1973-74 †	Annayya	Bidugade
1972-73	S. Ramachandra	Sankalpa
1971-72	D. V. Rajaram	Bangarada Manushya
1970-71	Tom Cowan	Samskara
1969-70	S. V. Srikanth	Gejje Pooje
1968-69	S. V. Srikanth	Margadarshi
1967-68	R. N. K. Prasad	Belli Moda

== See also ==
- Cinema of Karnataka
- List of Kannada-language films
