= Karnataka State Film Award for Best Child Actor (Male) =

Indian film award

- State award for contributions to Kannada cinema
- Awarded for: Best Performance by Child Artist
- Sponsored by: Government of Karnataka
- Rewards: Silver Medal; ₹ 20,000
- First award: 1973-74
- Final award: 2021
- Most recent winner: Athish Shetty

Highlights
- Most wins: Puneeth Rajkumar (2)
- Total awarded: 37
- First winner: G. S. Nataraj

Karnataka State Film Award for Best Child Actor (Male) is a film award of the Indian state of Karnataka given during the annual Karnataka State Film Awards. The award honours Kannada-language films.

== Key ==
Symbol	Meaning
†	Indicates a joint award for that year

== Award winners ==
The following is a partial list of award winners and the films for which they won.

Year	Winner	Role	Film
2021	Athish Shetty		Cake
2020	Ahil Ansari		Danthapurana
2019	Master Preetham		Minchulu
2018	Master Aaron		Ramana Savari
2017	Karthik		Rama Rajya
2016	K. Manohar	Jollu	Railway Children
2015	Likhith Sharma		Ashtavakra
2014	Snehith		Sachin! Tendulkar Alla
2013	Pradhyumna		Kariya Kannbitta
2012	Anil Kumar		Karanika Shishu
2011	Sankalp	Prasad	Prasad
2010-11	Channa Kumar		Ondooralli
2009-10	Chiranjeevi		Ekameva
2008-09	Manoj	Ramu	Nandadeepa
2007-08	Likhith	Gandhi	Naanu Gandhi
2006-07	Revanth		Daatu
2005-06	Kishan	Slum	Care of Footpath
2004-05	Aniruddh	Paapu	Rakshasa
2003-04	Varsha		Amaasa
2002-03	Nitil Krishna		Devara Makkalu
2001-02	Vijay		Yuddha Mattu Swatantrya
2000-01	Rohith Bhat		Mussanje
1999-2000	Manja	Kyatha	Deveeri
1998-99	Sukhesh		Varsharuthu
1996-97	Vinayak Joshi	Deepu	Nammoora Mandara Hoove
1994-95	Anand	Gunda	Thaayi Illada Thavaru
1993-94	Vijay Raghavendra	Muttha	Chinnari Mutha
1991-92	Anand	Ganesha	Gauri Ganesha
1989-90	Dhamarugendra	Kiran	Prathama Ushakirana
1987-88	Jayanth		Dange
1986-87 †	Santhosh	Babu	Tabarana Kathe
1986-87 †	Srivathsa	Child Madhva	Madhvacharya
1984-85	Manjunath	Papu	Parameshi Prema Prasanga
1983-84	Puneeth	• Raja • Rajakumara	Eradu Nakshatragalu
1982-83	Puneeth	Ramu	Chalisuva Modagalu
1980-81	Sathya Prakash	Ramu	Rama Lakshmana
1978-79	Prakash	Putta	Aparichita
1977-78	Ajith Kumar	Nani	Ghatashraddha
1976-77	• Prasad Tagat • Bhanu Prakash • Sathish		Nagarahole
1973-74	G. S. Nataraj	Kitty	Kaadu

== See also ==
- Cinema of Karnataka
- List of Kannada-language films
