= Puttanna Kanagal Award =

List of Recipients of Kannada cinema's Puttanna Kanagal award

Lt. Puttanna Kanagal Award
- State award for contributions to Kannada cinema
- Sponsored by: Government of Karnataka
- Rewards: Gold Medal; ₹ 2,00,000
- First award: 1986-87
- Final award: 2018
- Most recent winner: P. Sheshadri

Highlights
- Total awarded: 33
- First winner: Hunsur Krishnamurthy

The following is the list of Award winners for the Karnataka State Puttanna Kanagal award. Kanagal was among Kannada cinema's most successful film directors. In his memory and honor, this award is presented to the directors every year during the Karnataka State Awards function.

== Recipients ==
Year	Winner	Ref.
1986-87	Hunsur Krishnamurthy	
1987-88	G. V. Iyer	
1988-89	B. S. Ranga	
1989-90	T. N. Balakrishna	
1990-91	Y. R. Swamy	
1991-92	M. R. Vittal	
1992-93	Geethapriya	
1993-94	Siddalingaiah	
1994-95	K. S. L. Swamy	
1995-96	Dorai–Bhagavan	
1996-97	S. V. Rajendra Singh Babu	
1997-98	Girish Kasaravalli	
1998-99	T. S. Nagabharana	
1999-2000	V. Somashekhar	
2000-01	K. V. Jayaram	
2001-02	M. S. Rajashekar	
2002-03	Vijaya Reddy	
2003-04	T. Pattabhirama Reddy	
2004-05	A. T. Raghu	
2005-06	V. Ravichandran	
2006-07	Singeetham Srinivasa Rao	
2007-08	Renuka Sharma	
2008-09	K. S. R. Das (Note: This award is controversial when it announced. Firstly H. R. Bhargava–chairperson of the jury announced the name of K. S. R. Das in pressmeet. But in pressmeet, some journalists objected his name, claimed as What the contribution of Das to Kannada Cinema. Then Bhargava immediately announced the name of Girish Karnad. After the announcement, Karnad denied to receive the award. Ultimately this award given to Das.)	
2009-10	C. V. Shivashankar	
2010-11	H. R. Bhargava	
2011	D. Rajendra Babu	
2012	Chi. Dattaraj	
2013	P. H. Vishwanath	
2014	Baraguru Ramachandrappa	
2015	Nagathihalli Chandrashekhar	
2016	K. V. Raju	
2017	S. Narayan	
2018	P. Sheshadri	

== See also ==
- Karnataka State Film Awards
- Karnataka State Film Award for Best Film
