= Karnataka State Film Award for Best Dialogue =

Indian film award

Karnataka State Film Award for Best Dialogue Writer
- State award for contributions to Kannada cinema
- Awarded for: Award for narration of Story in Dialogues
- Sponsored by: Government of Karnataka
- Rewards: Silver Medal; ₹ 20,000
- First award: 1967-68
- Final award: 2020
- Most recent winner: Baraguru Ramachandrappa

Highlights
- Total awarded: 56
- First winner: Subramanya Raj Urs

Karnataka State Film Award for Best Dialogue Writer is a film award of the Indian state of Karnataka given during the annual Karnataka State Film Awards. The award honors Kannada-language films.

== Superlative winners ==
• P. Lankesh	3 Awards
• Chi. Udaya Shankar • Baraguru Ramachandrappa	4 Awards

== Award winners ==
The following is a partial list of award winners and the films for which they won.

Year	Winner	Film	Ref
2021	Baraguru Ramachandrappa	Thayi Kasthur Gandhi	
2020	Veerappa Maralvadi	Hoovina Hara	
2019	Baraguru Ramachandrappa	Amruthamathi	
2018	Shirish Joshi	Savitribai Phule	
2017	S. G. Siddaramaiah	Hebbet Ramakka	
2016	B. M. Giriraj	Amaravathi	
2015	Eere Gowda	Thithi	
2014	B. L. Venu	Thippaji Circle	
2013	Nagshekhar	Myna	
2012	M. S. Ramesh	Bheema Theeradalli	
2011	Gopi Peenya	Allide Nammane Illi Bande Summane	
2010-11	Lakshmipathi Kolar	Bhagavathi Kaadu	
2009-10	Godachi Maharudra	Banni	
2008-09	Hoo Pattanashetty	Kabaddi	
2008-09	Narendra Babu	Kabaddi	
2007-08	Agni Shridhar	Aa Dinagalu	
2006-07	Yogaraj Bhat	Mungaaru Male	
2005-06	Sudarshan	Mukha-Mukhi	
2005-06	Lakshmipathi Kolar	Mukha-Mukhi	
2004-05	B. A. Madhu	Santhosha	
2003-04	Jayanth Kaikini	Chigurida Kanasu	
2002-03	Venkatesh Prasad	Kaarmugilu	
2002-03	Nalini Venkatappa	Kaarmugilu	
2001-02	Thadoor Keshav	Dharma Devathe	
2000-01	P. R. Ramadas Naidu	Mussanje	
1999-2000	A. G. Sheshadri	Hrudaya Hrudaya	
1998-99	S. Surendranath	Bhoomi Thayiya Chochchala Maga	
1997-98	N. S. Shankar	Ulta Palta	
1996-97	Baraguru Ramachandrappa	Janumada Jodi	
1995-96	Sunil Kumar Desai	Beladingala Baale	
1995-96	Vamshi	Beladingala Baale	
1994-95	Kunigal Nagabhushan	Yarigu Helbedi	
1993-94	Kotiganahalli Ramaiah	Gejje Naada	
1992-93	Chi. Udaya Shankar	Jeevana Chaitra	
1991-92	Kunigal Nagabhushan	Gauri Ganesha	
1990-91	Pal Sudarshan	Yaaru Naanu	
1989-90	T. N. Seetharam	Panchama Veda	
1988-89	Kodalli Shivaram	Belli Belaku	
1987-88	U. R. Ananthamurthy	Avasthe	
1987-88	Krishna Masadi	Avasthe	
1986-87	K. P. Poornachandra Tejaswi	Tabarana Kathe	
1985-86	T. G. Ashwath Narayan	Masanada Hoovu	
1984-85	No Award		
1983-84	B. L. Venu	Aparanji	
1982-83	R. N. Jayagopal	Pallavi Anupallavi	
1981-82	Hunsur Krishnamurthy	Edeyooru Siddalingeshwara	
1980-81	Chandrashekhara Kambara	Sangeetha	
1979-80	P. Lankesh	Ellindalo Bandavaru	
1978-79	Baraguru Ramachandrappa	Ondu Oorina Kathe	
1977-78	P. Lankesh	Anuroopa	
1976-77	P. Lankesh	Pallavi	
1975-76	Chi. Udaya Shankar	Premada Kanike	
1974-75	Navarathnaram	Upasane	
1973-74	Hunsur Krishnamurthy	Bhootayyana Maga Ayyu	
1972-73	Chi. Udaya Shankar	Naagarahaavu	
1971-72	Girish Karnad	Vamsha Vriksha	
1971-72	B. V. Karanth	Vamsha Vriksha	
1970-71	Chi. Udaya Shankar	Kula Gourava	
1969-70	Navarathnaram	Gejje Pooje	
1968-69	R. N. Jayagopal	Namma Makkalu	
1967-68	M. Subrahmanya Raj Urs	Sarvamangala	

== See also ==
- Cinema of Karnataka
- List of Kannada-language films
