= Karnataka State Film Award for Best Story =

Indian film award

- State award for contributions to Kannada cinema
- Awarded for: Award for Writer of the Story
- Sponsored by: Government of Karnataka
- Rewards: Silver Medal; ₹ 20,000
- First award: 1967-68
- Final award: 2021
- Most recent winner: Manjunath Muniyappa

Highlights
- Total awarded: 46
- First winner: Subramanya Raj Urs

Karnataka State Film Award for Best Story is a film award of the Indian state of Karnataka given during the annual Karnataka State Film Awards. The award honors Kannada-language films.

== Superlative winners ==
• U. R. Ananthamurthy • Nagathihalli Chandrashekhar	3 awards
• Baraguru Ramachandrappa	5 awards

== Award winners ==
The following is a partial list of award winners and the films for which they won.

Year	Winner	Film
2021	Manjunath Muniyappa	Ombatthu Sullu Kathegalu
2020	Shashikant Gatti	Ranchi
2019	Jayanth Kaikini	Illu Iralaare Allu Hogalaare
2018	Harish S	Nayigere
2017	• Hanumanth B. Haligeri • Amaresha Nugadoni	• Kengulabi • Neeru Tandavaru
2016	Nandita Yadav	Raju Yedegebidda Akshara
2015	Saraju Katkar	July 22, 1947
2014	Living Smile Vidya	Naanu Avanalla...Avalu
2013	Srilalithe	Hajj
2012	Baraguru Ramachandrappa (Note: The author politely rejected the award.)	Angulimala
2011	Kum.Veerabhadrappa	Koormavatara
2010-11	Eshwar Chandra	Maagiya Kaala
2009-10	(Note: According to the order of Karnataka High Court, this award is taken back.)	
2008-09	Baraguru Ramachandrappa	Ugragami
2007-08	P. Lankesh (Note: This award was given posthumously.)	Avva
2006-07	H. Girish Rao (Janaki/Jogi)	Kaada Beladingalu
2005-06	C. N. Muktha	Miss California
2004-05	M. R. Ramesh	Santhosha
2003-04	Kari Subbu	Mani
2002-03	U. R. Ananthamurthy	Mouni
2001-02	Munirathna	Kambalahalli
2000-01	Bolwar Mahammad Kunhi	Munnudi
1999-2000	Baraguru Ramachandrappa	Hagalu Vesha
1998-99	S. V. Rajendra Singh Babu	Bhoomi Thayiya Chochchala Maga
1997-98	Ranganatha Shyam Rao Lokapura	Thaayi Saheba
1996-97	Nagathihalli Chandrashekhar	America America
1995-96	Gorur Ramaswamy Iyengar (Note: This award was given posthumously.)	Urvashi
1994-95	Shankar Mokashi Punekar	Gangavva Gangamaayi
1993-94	H. K. Anasuya Sampath	Ranjitha
1992-93	S. Surendranath	Aathanka
1991-92	Nagathihalli Chandrashekhar	Undu Hoda Kondu Hoda
1990-91	Srikrishna Alanahalli	Bhujangayyana Dashavathara
1989-90	K. P. Poornachandra Tejaswi	Kubi Matthu Iyala
1988-89	Nagathihalli Chandrashekhar	Sankranthi
1987-88	P. N. Rangan	Aasphota
1986-87	K. P. Poornachandra Tejaswi	Tabarana Kathe
1985-86	Vijay Sasanur	Dhruva Thare
1984-85	Shirley L. Arora	Bettada Hoovu
1983-84	Baraguru Ramachandrappa	Benki
1982-83	M. K. Indira	Phaniyamma
1981-82	S. S. Vidwan	Sanchari
1980-81	Chandrashekhara Kambara	Sangeetha
1979-80	No Award	
1978-79	Baraguru Ramachandrappa	Ondu Oorina Kathe
1977-78	U. R. Ananthamurthy	Ghatashraddha
1976-77	Masti Venkatesh Iyengar	Kakana Kote
1975-76	K. Shivaram Karanth	Chomana Dudi
1974-75	Triveni	Kankana
1973-74	Srikrishna Alanahalli	Kaadu
1972-73	T. R. Subba Rao	Naagarahaavu
1971-72	S. L. Bhyrappa	Vamsha Vriksha
1970-71	U. R. Ananthamurthy	Samskara
1969-70	Subramanyaraja Urs	Uyyale
1968-69	Triveni	Hannele Chiguridaga
1967-68	M. Subramanyaraja Urs	Sarvamangala

== See also ==
- Cinema of Karnataka
- List of Kannada-language films
