= Bigg Boss Kannada season 1 =

Bigg Boss Kannada
- Season 1
- Season 1 eye logo
- Presented by: Sudeep
- No. of days: 98
- No. of housemates: 15
- Winner: Vijay Raghavendra
- Runner-up: Arun Sagar

Release
- Original network: ETV Kannada
- Original release: 24 March – 30 June 2013

Series chronology
- Next → Season 2

Bigg Boss 1 is the season one of the Kannada version of Indian reality television series Bigg Boss was broadcast on ETV Kannada in 2013. The show was hosted by Sudeep. A prize amount of ₹50,00,000 was announced for the winner. The show lasted for 99 days starting from 24 March 2013 (Grand Premiere) to 30 June 2013 (Grand Finale). A total of 15 contestants and 2 guests had entered the show. The Bigg Boss house, located in Lonavala, was fixed with 47 cameras to capture the activities in the house.

Among the four finalists, Vijay Raghavendra emerged as the title winner with maximum votes, followed by Arun Sagar as runner-up. Nikita Thukral came third and Narendra Babu was fourth. Gurudas Shenoy was the Editor-in-chief for the house reality of this season.

== Housemate status ==
Sr	Housemate	Day entered	Day exited	Status
1	Vijay	Day 1	Day 99	Winner
2	Arun	Day 1	Day 99	1st Runner-Up
3	Nikita	Day 1	Day 99	2nd Runner-up
4	Narendra	Day 1	Day 99	3rd Runner-up
5	Chandrika	Day 1	Day 83	Evicted
5	Chandrika	Day 84	Day 90	Evicted
6	Anushree	Day 1	Day 76	Evicted
7	Rishika	Day 42	Day 62	Evicted
8	Rohan	Day 38	Day 55	Evicted
9	Jayalakshmi	Day 1	Day 6	Evicted
9	Jayalakshmi	Day 27	Day 48	Evicted
10	Aparna	Day 1	Day 41	Evicted
11	Thilak	Day 1	Day 41	Evicted
12	Vinayak	Day 1	Day 34	Evicted
13	Rishi	Day 14	Day 27	Evicted
14	Shweta	Day 1	Day 20	Evicted
15	Sanjjanaa	Day 1	Day 14	Evicted

== Housemates ==
Housemates	Famous for...	
Narendra Babu Sharma	TV Anchor; Guruji	He is popularly known to the public as "Brahmanda Guruji" from a series of TV shows like Zee Kannada’s Bruhat Brahmanda, Suvarna TV’s Bhavya Brahmanda, and Suvarna News Channel’s Brahmanda. He has worked as a junior artist in many South Indian movies.
Aparna	TV Anchor	Aparna Vastarey, known mononymously as Aparna, was an Indian actress, television presenter, and radio jockey. A popular face in Kannada television, she was known for her work as a presenter at DD Chandana and numerous events of the government. Her hold over Kannada & English was exemplary. She made her cinematic debut in 1984 with Puttanna Kanagal's last film, Masanada Hoovu. Between 2015 and 2021, she played Varalakshmi on the sketch comedy show, Majaa Talkies..
Anushree	TV Anchor	She is a VJ from Mangalore and has anchored programs like Namasthe Kasturi, Reel Suddi 365, Comedy Khiladigalu.
Rishi Kumar	Swami	A swami from Kalika Mata (Bengaluru). Media caught him in several controversies. Earlier, he used to be a dancer and a junior artist.
Jayalakshmi	Nurse	She worked as a nurse and now is a nursing college secretary. She is known to public from a controversy.
Chandrika	Actress	She is an actress of the 90s. Some of her movies are Golmaal Radhakrishna, Neenu Nakkare Haalu Sakkare, Hosa Raga, Nagashakthi.
Vinayak Joshi	RJ; Actor	RJ of City Maatu and Aithalakadi Morning on Radio City 91.1 FM. He is also an actor, producer, director, and a theater artist.
Thilak Shekar	Actor	He is a model-turned-actor since 2006. Some of his movies are Ganda Hendathi, Accident, Huchchi.
Shweta Pandit	Actress	She is an actress known for the movies Paramathma, Case No 18/9, Theatre Lo (Telugu).
Sanjjanaa	Actress	She is a model and an actress. She has acted in several South Indian movies.
Arun Sagar	Art Director	He is a reputed art director. He is multi talented and has acted in movies, TV shows, and theater.
Vijay Raghavendra	Actor	He is a well-known actor in Sandalwood.
Nikita Thukral	Actress	She is a popular female lead in South Indian movies.

=== Wild card entries ===
Wild Card Entry	Famous for...	
Rohan Gowda	Reality Show Alumni	He is the winner of Suvarna TV’s reality show Pyate Mandi Kadige Bandru. He is also a model and a bodybuilder.
Rishika Singh	Actress	She is an actress known for the movies Kanteerava, Kalla Malla Sulla, and Benki Birugali.

=== Guests ===
Guests	Famous for...	
Yogesh	Actor	He is popularly known for the character Loose Maada from the movie Duniya. He had a lead role in movies Nanda Loves Nanditha, Hudugaru, Dool, Yogi.
Rajesh	Reality Show Alumni	He was from a tribal village and a winner of the Suvarna TV's Halli Haida, Pyateg Banda reality show. He had acted in the movie Jungle Jackie. He died in November 2013.

== Episodes ==
The episodes were broadcast by ETV Kannada channel at a time slot of 8 to 9 pm daily. After the Grand Finale, the channel continued to telecast Autograph series in which the contestants shared their experience in the house.

	Monday	Tuesday	Wednesday	Thursday	Friday	Saturday	Sunday
Event	Nominations	Weekly Task; Highlights			Eviction	Promotion & Interview	Unseen Episode

Programmes

- Grand Premiere: Bigg Boss Kannada
- Daily Highlights
- Varada Kathe Kicchana Jothe
- Super Saturday with Sudeep
- Unseen Episode
- Grand Finale: Curtain Raiser
- Grand Finale
- Grand Finale: Final Cut
- Grand Finale: Unseen Episode
- Autograph

== Nominations table ==
	Week 1	Week 2	Week 3	Week 4	Week 5	Week 6	Week 7	Week 8	Week 9	Week 10	Week 11	Week 12	Week 13		Week 14	
Vijay	Narendra; Jayalakshmi	Narendra; Sanjjana	Vinayak; Shweta	Rishi; Nikita	Chandrika; Vinayak	Aparna; Narendra	Jayalakshmi; Narendra brahmanda	Narendra; Anushree	Rishika; Narendra	Chandrika; Narendra	Chandrika; Arun	Narendra; Nikita	Chandrika; Narendra		Winner (Day 99)	
Arun	Sanjjana; Chandrika	Narendra; Sanjjana	Vinayak; Chandrika	Nikita; Rishi	Vinayak; Aparna	Aparna; Jayalakshmi	Jayalakshmi; Nikita	Narendra; Rohan	Nikita; Narendra	Narendra; Nikita	Nikita; Anushree	Nikita; Narendra	Nikita; Narendra		1st runner-up (Day 99)	
Nikita	Aparna; Shweta	Chandrika; Aparna	Chandrika; Vinayak	Arun; Vinayak	Chandrika; Vijay	Jayalakshmi; Thilak	Jayalakshmi; Arun	Arun; Anushree	Narendra; Chandrika	Arun; Vijay	Arun; Chandrika	Narendra; Chandrika	Chandrika; Vijay		2nd runner-up (Day 99)	
Narendra	Jayalakshmi; Anushree	Arun; Shweta	Chandrika; Shweta	Vinayak; Nikita	Chandrika; Arun	Jayalakshmi; Arun	Jayalakshmi; Vijay	Anushree; Rohan	Nikita; Anushree	Nikita; Vijay	Nikita; Vijay	Vijay; Nikita	Vijay; Nikita		3rd runner-up (Day 99)	
Chandrika	Narendra; Nikita	Sanjjana; Nikita	Nikita; Narendra	Nikita; Anushree	Narendra; Vinayak	Aparna; Nikita	Nikita; Anushree	Anushree; Nikita	Rishika; Nikita	Vijay; Anushree	Nikita; Vijay	Nikita; Vijay	Evicted (Day 83)	Vijay; Nikita	Evicted (Day 90)	
Anushree	Narendra; Thilak	Narendra; Vinayak	Chandrika; Shweta	Rishi; Vinayak	Narendra; Vinayak	Jayalakshmi; Thilak	Chandrika	Rishika; Narendra	Narendra; Rishika	Chandrika; Narendra	Arun; Nikita	Evicted (Day 76)				
Rishika	Not In House						Exempt	Narendra; Anushree	Chandrika; Narendra	Evicted (Day 62)						
Rohan	Not In House						Exempt	Anushree; Narendra	Evicted (Day 55)							
Jayalakshmi	Narendra; Thilak	Evicted (Day 6)			Narendra; Anushree	Nikita; Aparna	Narendra; Nikita	Rohan; Anushree	Evicted (Day 48)							
Thilak	Narendra; Jayalakshmi	Sanjjana; Arun	Vinayak; Arun	Rishi; Nikita	Vinayak; Nikita	Banned	Evicted (Day 41)									
Aparna	Nikita; Chandrika	Nikita; Sanjjana	Anushree; Nikita	Rishi; Vinayak	Chandrika; Vinayak	Jayalakshmi; Chandrika	Evicted (Day 41)									
Vinayak	Jayalakshmi; Arun	Arun; Anushree	Chandrika; Shweta	Rishi; Anushree	Nikita; Aparna	Evicted (Day 34)										
Rishi	Not In House		Exempt	Vinayak; Nikita	Evicted (Day 27)											
Shweta	Narendra; Aparna	Sanjjana; Nikita	Nikita; Narendra	Evicted (Day 20)												
Sanjjanaa	Thilak; Shweta	Thilak; Chandrika	Evicted (Day 13)													
Notes	(none)		1	2,3	4	5,6,7	8,9,10	11	(none)	12	13	14, 15, 16		16	17	
Against Public votes	Narendra; Jayalakshmi	Sanjjanaa; Arun; Nikita; Narendra	Chandrika; Vinayak; Shweta	Rishi; Nikita; Vinayak	Vinayak; Chandrika	Anushree; Aparna; Arun; Chandrika; Jayalakshmi; Narendra; Nikita; Thilak; Vijay	Chandrika; Jayalakshmi; Nikita	Narendra; Anushree; Rohan	Narendra; Rishika; Nikita	~~Vijay~~; ~~Narendra~~; ~~Nikita~~; ~~Chandrika~~	Nikita; Arun; ~~Chandrika~~; Vijay; Anushree	Vijay; Chandrika; Arun		Vijay; Nikita; Chandrika; Narendra	Arun; Narendra; Nikita; Vijay	
Re-entered	None													Chandrika	None	
Evicted	Jayalakshmi	Sanjjanaa	Shweta	Rishi	Vinayak	Thilak	Jayalakshmi	Rohan	Rishika	No; Eviction	Anushree	Chandrika		Chandrika	Narendra	Nikita
Evicted	Jayalakshmi	Sanjjanaa	Shweta	Rishi	Vinayak	Aparna	Jayalakshmi	Rohan	Rishika	No; Eviction	Anushree	Chandrika		Chandrika	Arun	Vijay

=== Notes ===
- ^Note 1: Rishikumara, being a new entry, was safe from the nomination process.
- ^Note 2: Vachan [special rights granted by Bigg Boss during eviction] choose Chandrika to be safe from the nomination process.
- ^Note 3: Jayalakshmi re-entered the house after the weekly nomination process.
- ^Note 4: Jayalakshmi, being a new entry, was safe from nomination process but was granted the right to vote.
- ^Note 5: Rishika entered the house after the weekly nomination process.
- ^Note 6: Rohan entered the house after the weekly nomination process.
- ^Note 7: Bigg Boss informed Thilak that all the housemates were nominated for eviction irrespective of the nomination process. Thilak was not asked to vote.
- ^Note 8: Anushree [special rights granted by Bigg Boss] directly nominated Chandrika for eviction.
- ^Note 9: Rishika, being a new entry, was safe from the nomination process.
- ^Note 10: Rohan, being a new entry, was safe from the nomination process.
- ^Note 11: Jayalakshmi [special rights granted by Bigg Boss during eviction] choose Rohan & Anushree to be directly nominated for eviction.
- ^Note 12: In a twist, eviction was canceled but the nomination was conducted.
- ^Note 13: Narendra Sharma [special rights granted by Bigg Boss during nomination] choose Chandrika to be safe from the eviction.
- ^Note 14: In a twist, nominated candidates (Nikita, Narendra) were declared as safe, and the rest had to face eviction.
- ^Note 15: Chandrika was evicted after facing the public vote, but re-entered the house after a day.
- ^Note 16: Chandrika [special rights granted by Bigg Boss during eviction] choose Arun Sagar to be safe from the nomination process. Thus, Arun became the first finalist.
- ^Note 17: Among the four finalists, Vijay Raghavendra, was declared as the winner after facing the public vote.

== Weekly summary ==
Week 1	Grand Premier	Narendra, Sanjjanaa, Arun, Shweta, Vinayak, Aparna, Anushree, Thilak, Nikita, Vijay, Chandrika, and Jayalakshmi entered the Bigg Boss house on 24 March 2013.
Week 1	Nominations	Narendra (6 votes); Jayalakshmi (4 votes)
Week 1	Task 1	Title: Shubhaarambh (Agni Pooja); Description: The housemates had to conduct Agni pooja and ensure that the fire continues to burn for 3 days and 2 nights in the homa kunda. Firewood and ghee was supplied in sufficient quantity.; Result: The task was completed successfully.; Luxury Points: 5000 points.
Week 1	Happenings	The housemates celebrated Holi festival.
Week 1	Punishment	Nikita took 25 dips in the swimming pool for misusing water during the Holi celebrations.
Week 1	Exit	Day 6: Jayalakshmi was evicted from the house after facing the public vote.
Week 1	Special Rights	Jayalakshmi chose Narendra to watch the housemates follow the house rules.
Week 2	Nominations	Sanjjanaa (6 votes), Arun (3 votes), Nikita (3 votes), and Narendra (3 votes)
Week 2	Task 2	Title: Ulta Pulta (Cross-dressing); Description: Women had to rest and supervise the household activities done by the cross-dressed men. Men had to ensure that women do not step on the floor and had to carry them when needed. In return, women had to perform to a song and entertain the male housemates. Men and women were paired by a chained handcuff for a day.: Result: The task was completed successfully.; Luxury Points: 3000 points.
Week 2	Punishment	Narendra sat on a chair for 7 hours in the sunlight (garden area) for sleeping during daytime.
Week 2	Exit	Day 13: Sanjjanaa was evicted from the house after facing the public vote.
Week 2	Entry	Day 14: The 13th contestant Rishi Kumara entered the house.
Week 2	Special Rights	Sanjjanaa chose Narendra to supervise the kitchen activities.
Week 3	Nominations	Chandrika (5 votes), Vinayak (4 votes), and Shweta (4 votes)
Week 3	Task 3	Title: Devatas & Rakshasas (Angles & Demons); Description: The housemates were divided into two teams, each led by a leader.; Day 16: Devatas had to safeguard the locker from the rakshasas. Rakshasas had to open the locker with a key and to take the letter inside it. Once accomplished, the teams were swapped and the task was repeated.: Day 17 & 18: Both teams were to campaign and convince the opposite team members to join their side. The team with more members was declared as the winner (Devatas).; Rakshasas / Devatas; Narendra Babu [C] / Rishi Kumara [C]; Vinayak / Chandrika; Nikita / Shweta; Vijay / Arun; / Thilak; / Anushree; / Aparna; Result: The task was completed successfully.; Luxury Points: 1500 points.
Week 3	Happenings	Day 19: The housemates celebrated Ugadi festival.
Week 3	Exit	Day 20: Shweta Pandit was evicted from the house after facing the public vote.
Week 3	Special Rights	Shweta Pandit chose Chandrika to be safe from next nomination.
Week 4	Nominations	Rishi Kumara (6 votes), Nikita (6 votes), and Vinayak (5 votes)
Week 4	Task 4	Title: Ondu Cinema Kathe (Short film direction); Description: Arun and Narendra were the directors who conducted auditions to select housemates for various movie characters.; Day 23: Babhruvahana 2013 - To remake the mythological movie Babhruvahana in a modern style. Day 24: Purathana Apthamitra - To remake the super hit movie Apthamitra in a classical style. Day 25: Bigg Boss House Spoof - The housemates had to imitate each other.: Results from voting: Team Arun was rated 35 (winner) Team Narendra was rated 27.5: Luxury Points: No points. The winning team had to choose one item from the budget list.
Week 4	Exit	Day 27: Rishi Kumar was evicted from the house after facing the public vote.
Week 4	Entry	Day 27: The ex-housemate Jayalakshmi re-entered the house.
Week 4	Special Rights	Rishi Kumar chose Anushree to stay outside the house (garden area) for a week. The duration was reduced later.
Week 5	Nominations	Vinayak (5 votes) and Chandrika (4 votes)
Week 5	Task 5	Title: Surgery and Bharjari Nursing Home; Description: Doctors and nurses had to treat the mental patients by various methods.; Housemates / Roles; Vijay / Sr.Doctor; Vinayak / Jr.Doctor; Aparna; Jayalakshmi / Nurse; Thilak / Wardboy; Anushree; Nikita; Chandrika; Narendra; Arun / Mental patients; Varshikotsav – An anniversary function in which the patients performed to a song. Rajesh entered the house as a chief guest for the function. Raja & praja - The housemates had to treat the guest Rajesh as a king and obey his orders.: Results: The tasks were completed successfully.; Luxury Points: 5000 points.
Week 5	Exits	Day 34: Vinayak Joshi was evicted from the house after facing the public vote. The guest Rajesh also exit the house.
Week 5	Special Rights	Vinayak Joshi chose Vijay to deprive the usage of any personal belongings like clothes, footwear, and cosmetics (had to borrow from others).
Week 6	Nominations	All housemates were nominated.
Week 6	Entry	Day 38: Rohan Gowda entered the house.; Day 42: Rishika Singh entered the house.
Week 6	Task 6	Title: Raajneeti (Politics); Description: The housemates had to form political parties and campaign for votes.; / Porake Paksha / Bigg Boss Paksha / Apple Paksha; Leader / Rohan / Jayalakshmi / Anshree; Secretary / Arun / / Thilak; Members / Chandrika / / Narendra; Vijay; Aparna; Nikita; Result / Lost / Dissolved / Won; Results: Task was completed successfully.; Anushree was granted the right to choose a housemate for direct nomination.; Luxury Points: 3000 points for the winning team.
Week 6	Punishment	All housemates were nominated for eviction by Bigg Boss as a punishment for breaking the house rules.
Week 6	Exit	Day 41: Thilak & Aparna were evicted after facing public vote.
Week 6	Special Rights	Aparna chose Jayalakshmi & Vijay to be in pair all the time.
Week 7	Nominations	Chandrika (direct nomination by Anushree), Jayalakshmi (4 votes), and Nikita (3 votes)
Week 7	Entry	Day 42: Rishika Singh entered the house.
Week 7	Task 7	Title: Bigg Boss Olympics; Description: The housemates were divided into two teams and had to compete in various sports activities for points. Rishika was named as Olympics games commissioner.; Teams / Garjanae / Jai Hanuman; Leader / Rohan / Vijay; Members / Nikita; Chandrika; Jayalakshmi / Arun; Anushree; Narendra; Points / 183 (won) / 120; Results: Task was completed successfully.; Luxury Points: 2000 points for the winning team.
Week 7	Exit	Day 48: Jayalakshmi was evicted after facing public vote.
Week 7	Special Rights	Jayalakshmi chose Rohan & Anushree for direct nomination.
Week 8	Nominations	Narendra (5 votes), Anushree (7 votes), and Rohan (3 votes)
Week 8	Entry	Day 54: Guest Yogesh entered the house.
Week 8	Task 8	Title: Bhima Maduve Sambrama (marriage occasion); Description: The housemates were divided into two teams. The teams enacted bride selection, marriage rituals, and celebrations.; / Role / Housemates; Groom Side / Groom / Yogesh; Groom Side / Father / Arun; Groom Side / Mother / Chandrika; Groom Side / Broker/Pandit / Narendra; Bride Side / Bride / Nikith; Bride Side / Younger sister / Anushree; Bride Side / Brother / Rohan; Bride Side / Elder Sister / Rishika; Bride Side / Brother-in-law / Vijay; Results: Task was completed successfully.
Week 8	Exit	Day 55: Rohan Gowda was evicted after facing public vote.
Week 8	Special Rights	Rohan Gowda chose Arun to wash the clothes of all housemates.
Week 9	Punishment	The water supply for the house was stopped for the day. Anushree, Yogesh, and Nikita had to do 100 sit-ups for misusing the water and damaging their mics.
Week 9	Nominations	Narendra (5 votes), Rishika (3 votes), and Nikita (3 votes)
Week 9	Task 9	Title: Kalla Police; Description: The housemates were divided into teams for the task.; Police: To prevent theft of listed things. To recognize the gang leader. Kalla: To steal the listed things. Jana Samanya: To confuse the police investigation.: Housemates / Team / Result; Arun; Nikita; Rishika / Police / Fail; Narendra (gang leader); Yogesh; Chandrika / Kalla / Pass; Anushree; Vijay / Jana Samanya / Pass; Results: Task was completed successfully.; Luxury Points: 2000 points for the winning teams.
Week 9	Exit	Day 62: Rishika was evicted after facing public vote.
Week 9	Special Rights	Rishika chose Nikita & Chandrika to be paired by handcuff for a week.
Week 10	Nominations	Vijay (3 votes), Narendra (3 votes), Nikita (2 votes),and Chandrika (2 votes)
Week 10	Task 10	Title: Shakti Patha; Description: There were three 24-hour tasks.; Jala Samrakshana (safeguard water) - The housemates had to prevent water loss from a leaky water tank by blocking the holes with their fingers. Thulabhara (Balancing scale)- The housemates had to balance a scale with household items and two housemates. Thuli Maga Thuli (Cycling) - The housemates had to continuously pedal a cycle rickshaw [on stand] and cover specified distance that was displayed on a board. The housemates refused to do this task as they were physically exhausted from previous tasks, and there was some technical issue with the cycle rickshaw.: Results: Task was completed successfully.; Luxury Points: 7000 points.
Week 10	Happenings	Day 70: Family members of housemates took a short visit to the house.
Week 10	Exit	No eviction.; Day 70: Guest Yogesh exit the house.
Week 11
Week 11	Nominations	Nikita (4 votes), Arun (3 votes), Vijay (2 votes),and Anushree (2 votes); Narendra chose Chandrika to be safe from nomination.
Week 11	Task 11	Title: Joy of Schooling; Description: The housemates had to run a boarding school which included 3 hours of classroom periods.; Each housemate had to teach a subject for the rest. This task included regular class periods, picnic, competition, quiz, and annual function.: Housemates / Subject; Anushree / Maths; Arun / Arts & Drama; Chandrika (Warden) / English; Narendra / Physical Training; Nikita / Kannada; Vijay / Dance & Music; Results: Task was completed successfully.; Luxury Points: 2500 points.
Week 11	Exit	Day 76: Anushree was evicted after facing public vote.
Week 11	Special Rights	Anushree chose Chandrika to do all the household activities.
Week 12	Happenings	Day 78: Host Sudeep entered the house to interact with the housemates.
Week 12	Nominations	Vijay (2 votes), Chandrika (1 votes), and Arun (0 votes) were nominated for eviction. Nominations was reversed.
Week 12	Task 12	Title: Chaati Beesu Prani Palagisu (taming animals); Description: The hunter had to capture, tame, and circus train the animals.; Housemate / Role; Chandrika / Hunter; Arun / Lion; Narendra / Elephant; Nikita / Monkey; Vijay / Bear; Results: Task was completed successfully.; Luxury Points: 2000 points.
Week 12	Exit	Day 83: Chandrika was evicted after facing public vote.
Week 12	Special Rights	Chandrika chose Arun to be safe from next nomination.
Week 13	Entry	Day 84: Chandrika re-entered the house.
Week 13	Nominations	Vijay (3 votes), Nikita (3 votes), Chandrika (2 votes), and Narendra (2 votes)
Week 13	Task 13	Day 84: Title: Kitchen Khiladi - Two teams had to prepare sweets and rate each other.: Teams: Narendra & Nikita (won) Arun & Vijay (lost): Previous tasks were repeated.; Ulta Pulta - Men had to cross-dress and involve in household activities. Women had to supervise those activities. Ondu Cinema Kathe - Arun Sagar had to direct the movie Hingaru Male, a comic version of the original movie Mungaru Male. Thuli Maga Thuli - Housemates had to cover a specified distance by cycling a cycle rickshaw [on stand]. They had to perform to a song for each destination.: Results: Task was completed successfully.
Week 13	Exit	Day 90: Chandrika was evicted after facing public vote.
Week 14	Task 14	Day 91: Title: Duracell sponsor task: Description: Torches were provided to all housemates. The housemates who got the Duracell-powered torches were declared as winner as the torches would last longer than others batteries.; Result: Narendra and Vijay won android watches.
Week 14	Suitcase	Day 91-92: A suitcase with ₹10 Lakhs was offered if a housemate was willing to leave the show, but none were interested.
Week 14	Happenings	Day 93-95: Ex-housemates took turns in visiting the house and engaged in various, related tasks.; Day 96: The housemates were provided with mobile phones [no SIM] to take pictures.; Day 97: The housemates packed their belongings.; Day 98: The housemates conducted Ganesha pooja.
Grand Finale	30 June 2013	Grand Finale Awards; Performer of the day award - Aparna Crying Star Award - Anushree Hot Star Award - Shweta Pandit Six-pack Star Award - Rohan Gowda Laughing Star Award - Sanjjanaa Dancing Star Award - Jayalakshmi Jodi Hakki Award - Tilak & Shweta Pandith Dialogue King Award - Rushi Kumar Kitchen Khiladi Award - Narendra Sharma & Nikita Breaking Star Award - Narendra Sharma Paisa Vasool Entertainment Star Award - Narendra Sharma: Grand Finale Results; Winner - Vijay Raghavendra Runner-up - Arun Sagar Third - Nikita Thukral Fourth - Narendra Sharma

== Reception and viewership ==
As per Indiantelevision.com's news release, the show achieved the highest TRPs than any other Kannada GEC. The launch episode had a rating of 4.7 TRP and the eviction episodes on Fridays reached 6.3 TRP. The week average was about 4.7 TRP.

The SMS votes by the audience were claimed to be approximately 47,000 per contestant and touched a lakh during the finals.

== Awards ==
GCC Puraskar Media :-

- Best Reality Show - ETV Kannada
