= S. A. Chinnegowda =

Indian film producer

S. A. Gowda
- Occupation: Producer
- Spouse: Jayamma
- Children: Vijay Raghavendra; Sri Murali
- Relatives: Parvathamma Rajkumar (Sister); Rajkumar (Brother-in-law/Cousin) see Rajkumar family

S. A. Chinne Gowda is an Indian film producer and distributor of Kannada films.

== Personal life ==
Gowda was born in Saligrama to Appaji Gowda and Lakshmamma. He married Jayamma and has two sons. Jayamma is also a film producer who produced movies like sevanthi sevanthi. Both of his sons, Sri Murali and Vijay Raghavendra, are film actors.

His older sister, Parvathamma Rajkumar, and his brothers, S. A. Govindaraj and S. A. Srinivas, are also producers in the Kannada film industry.

He worked as treasurer and vice-president for Karnataka Film Chamber of Commerce - KFCC.

== Filmography ==
- Jagamechida Huduga in 1983 with Shiv Rajkumar in a lead role.
- Jwalamukhi with Rajkumar in a lead role under the direction of Singeetam Srinivasa Rao in 1985.
- Manamecchida Hudugi in 1987 with Shiv Rajkumar in a lead role.
- Rupayi Raja with Jaggesh in a lead role.
- Urvashi Kalyana
- Sammilana
- Sevanthi Sevanthi
- Ganesha Matthe Banda
- Sri Harikathe with his younger son Sri Murali in a lead role.
