= Sevanthi Sevanthi =

- VCD cover
- Directed by: S. Narayan
- Written by: S. Narayan
- Produced by: Jayamma Chinne Gowda
- Starring: Vijay Raghavendra; Ramya
- Cinematography: PKH Das
- Edited by: P. R. Soundar Rajan
- Music by: S. A. Rajkumar
- Production company: Sowbhagya Pictures
- Release date: 14 April 2006
- Running time: 166 minutes
- Country: India
- Language: Kannada

Sevanthi Sevanthi is a 2006 Indian Kannada language romance-drama musical film directed and written by S. Narayan. The film stars Vijay Raghavendra and Ramya in the lead roles. The film is presented by Parvathamma Rajkumar and produced by Jayamma Chinne Gowda in association with S. A. Chinne Gowda. The music is composed by S. A. Rajkumar who has reproduced the best known Kannada folk songs since the story is about Devu (Vijay Raghavendra), a son of a butter seller, who is very good at singing folk songs.

The film upon release met with a positive response and ran for a hundred days. Critics noted that the film is enjoyable with quality performances and high-class visuals.

== Cast ==
- Vijay Raghavendra as Devu
- Ramya as Sevanthi
- Mukhyamantri Chandru
- Doddanna
- Thulasi Shivamani
- Komal Kumar
- Padmini Prakash
- Asha Rani
- Vijaya Krishna
- Suraj
- Jayaram
- Rajesh Balipa

== Production ==
The film was launched on 13 November 2005 at Rockline Studios.

== Soundtrack ==
Sevanthi Sevanthi

Soundtrack album by S. A. Rajkumar
- Released: 12 January 2006
- Recorded: 2006
- Genre: Feature film soundtrack
- Length: 33:07
- Label: Ashwini Audio

All the songs are composed and scored by S. A. Rajkumar. The soundtrack consists of popular Kannada folk songs. The album consists of seven tracks.

Track listing
No.	Title	Singer(s)	Length
1.	"Bhagyada Balegara"	Kunal Ganjawala, Shreya Ghoshal	4:47
2.	"Jaji Malli"	Vijay Raghavendra, Shreya Ghoshal	5:15
3.	"Nodavalandava"	Shankar Mahadevan	4:51
4.	"Maayadanta Male"	K. S. Chithra	4:22
5.	"Chellidaru Malligeya"	S. A. Rajkumar	5:29
6.	"Nimbiya Banada Myagala"	Kunal Ganjawala, Priya Hemesh	3:58
7.	"Maayadanta Male"	K. S. Chithra	4:25
Total length:			33:07

== Reception ==
A critic from Rediff.com wrote that "An enjoyable film, but it could have been better if it had some progressive content. Nevertheless, in these days of remakes, the audience should be happy with something original". A critic from Chitraloka.com wrote that "Brilliant director S.Narayan has served an ace. The new gripping area he has touched in this film is tidy and this is a wholesome entertainer. When you look at this film in any angle there are no mistakes". A critic from Viggy wrote that "Watch out for some great visual treats and good performances". B. S. Srivani of Deccan Herald wrote " The movie is quite sound but is like a body without soul. With a little taut direction, the film could have indeed gone on to become another champion from Narayan’s stables. One wonders whether Narayan is losing his wizard’s touch". Sify wrote "Has director S. Narayan lost the magic touch? Yes seems to be the answer as Sevanti Sevanti is an old fashioned story that moves at snail pace. But the plus points are its visual splendor and on the whole the film reminds you of a mega serial on television".
