= Jog 101 =

Indian suspense thriller film

- Theatrical release poster
- Directed by: Vijay Kannadiga
- Written by: Vijay Kannadiga; Suman Jadhugar
- Dialogues by: Suman Jadhugar
- Produced by: T. R. Raghavendra
- Starring: Vijay Raghavendra; Tejashwini Shekar
- Cinematography: Suneeth Halgeri
- Edited by: Mohan L. Rangakahale
- Music by: Avinaash Basuthkar
- Production company: Seven Star Pictures
- Release date: 7 March 2024
- Country: India
- Language: Kannada

Jog 101 is a 2024 Indian Kannada-language suspense thriller film written and directed by Vijay Kannadiga in his directorial debut. The film stars Vijay Raghavendra and Tejashwini Shekar alongside, Rajesh Nataranga, Govinde Gowda, Niranjan Deshpande, Yashaswini Deshpande, Tilak Shekar and Kaddipudi Chandru in supporting roles.

== Cast ==
- Vijay Raghavendra as Vikram
- Tejashwini Shekar
- Rajesh Nataranga
- Govinde Gowda
- Niranjan Deshpande
- Yashaswini Deshpande
- Tilak Shekar as Amar
- Kaddipudi Chandru

== Production ==
=== Development ===
Vijay Kannadiga, an author, ventures into filmmaking with this project, marking his directorial debut. Vijay Raghavendra boarded the project, convinced by the combination of Vijay Kannadiga's script and the chance to film at Jog Falls. Raghavendra has been cast in the lead role as a software engineer, alongside Tejaswini Shekar, who is known for her performance in the 2020 TV series Sangarsha, as the female lead. The film was produced by T. R. Raghavendra under the banner of Seven Star Pictures. The cinematography was by Suneeth Halgeri, while the editing was handled by Mohan L. Rangakahale.

=== Filming ===
In March 2022, it was reported that the film's first schedule was completed. The film was shot in Jog Falls and around the Western Ghats.

== Soundtrack ==
The soundtrack was composed by Avinaash Basuthkar. The lyrics were written by V. Nagendra Prasad, Jayanth Kaikini and Manwarshi Navalagunda.

Track listing
No.	Title	Lyrics	Singer(s)	Length
1.	"Munjaane Manjannu"	V. Nagendra Prasad	Raghu Dixit	4:07
2.	"Manadanne"	Jayanth Kaikini	Sanjith Hegde	4:24
Total length:				8:31

== Release ==
The film was released theatrically on 7 March 2024.

== Reception ==
Harish Basavarajaiah of The Times of India rated the film three out of five stars and wrote, "Jog 101 guides the audience through a suspense-laden expedition. Centered around journeys, as hinted by its title, the film intertwines its narrative with the renowned waterfall, heightening the suspense." Shashiprasad SM of Times Now gave it two out of five stars and wrote, "Following his impressive Case of Kondana, actor Vijay Raghavendra returns with yet another suspense crime thriller. However, this one falls short on many counts and barely manages to make an impression."

A Sharadhaa of Cinema Express gave it two out of five stars and wrote, "Director Vijay seemed to have a promising script at his disposal, but he struggled to maintain a clear focus". Prathibha Joy of OTTplay gave it one-and-a-half out of five stars and wrote, "Vijay Raghavendra’s latest is neither a full-fledged thriller or a romantic drama. It’s a misfire on all counts."
