= Naanu Neenu Jodi =

- VCD cover
- Directed by: N. R. Nanjunde Gowda
- Written by: M L Prasanna (dialogue)
- Screenplay by: Nanjunde Gowda
- Story by: Ramani
- Produced by: Anjaneyalu Pratthipati
- Starring: Vijay Raghavendra; Madhumitha
- Cinematography: A. C. Mahendra
- Edited by: B. S. Kemparaju
- Music by: Hamsalekha
- Production company: Rasashree Productions
- Release date: 21 December 2007
- Country: India
- Language: Kannada

Naanu Neenu Jodi (transl. I and you are a pair) is a 2007 Indian Kannada-language romantic comedy film directed by N. R. Nanjunde Gowda and starring Vijay Raghavendra and Madhumitha. The music for the film was composed by Hamsalekha. The film was released on 21 December 2007 alongside Ee Bandhana.

== Cast ==
- Vijay Raghavendra as Arjun
- Madhumitha as Gowri
- Chidanand as Mylarlinga
- Anukha
- Jaya
- Bank Janardhan
- Srinivasa Murthy
- Mukhyamantri Chandru
- Ashalatha
- Sundar Raj
- Pramila Joshai
- Sanjana

== Soundtrack ==
The music was composed by Hamsalekha. The songs were released under the Anand Audio label.

Track listing
No.	Title	Singer(s)	Length
1.	"Navule Navule"	Udit Narayan	6:18
2.	"Jum Naranadi"	Sunidhi Chauhan	4:52
3.	"Madling Maduve Beka"	S. P. Balasubrahmanyam	4:45
4.	"Preethisalu Dhairya Bekamma"	Rajesh Krishnan, Sunidhi Chauhan	4:50
5.	"Kagadada Doni"	Rajesh Krishnan, K. S. Chithra	5:09
Total length:			25:54

== Reception ==
A critic from Chitraloka.com wrote that "Director Nanjunde Gowda has shown once again that he always chooses something which is different and fresh. His film Naanu Neenu Jodi with Vijaya Raghavendra in the lead has a totally new concept which is yet to be seen in the Kannada film industry".
