= Benki Birugali =

Benki Birugali may refer to:

- Benki Birugali (1984 film), an Indian Kannada-language film
- Benki Birugali (2013 film), an Indian Kannada-language action comedy film
