= Beladingalagi Baa =

- Directed by: M. S. Ramesh
- Written by: M. S. Ramesh
- Produced by: B V Pramod
- Starring: Vijay Raghavendra; Ramaneethu Chaudari
- Cinematography: D Srinivas
- Edited by: S Manohar
- Music by: Gurukiran
- Production company: 24 Frames
- Release date: February 2008
- Country: India
- Language: Kannada

Beladingalagi Baa (transl. Come like the moonlight) is a 2008 Kannada-language film directed by M. S. Ramesh and starring Vijay Raghavendra and Ramaneethu Chaudari. The music of the film was composed by Gurukiran. The title of the movie is derived from the song of the same name from the 1979 movie Huliya Haalina Mevu.

== Cast ==
- Vijay Raghavendra as Vivek
- Ramaneethu Chaudari as Vasu
- Chandrashekhara Kambara
- Shobaraj as Kapu
- Avinash as Vasu's father
- Rangayana Raghu as Prakash
- Mandeep Roy
- Sanketh Kashi
- Vanishree

== Soundtrack ==
All music is composed by Gurukiran.

No.	Title	Singer(s)	Length
1.	"Baa Maal"	Vijay Raghavendra, Shamitha Malnad
2.	"O Jaane Kel"	Anirudh, Shamitha Malnad
3.	"Nee Nanna Usiragabeda"	Rahul Vaidya
4.	"Saari Saari Naa Heluvenu"	Udit Narayan, K. S. Chithra
5.	"Jeevakka Heluthade"	Sunitha
6.	"Tension Tension"	Gurukiran
7.	"Sachidananda"	Dr Chandrasekhar Kambara

== Release and reception ==
The film was released in February 2008 and received mixed reviews. Sify in their review wrote that the film lacked substance and a "required punch" was missing. A critic from Chitraloka.com wrote that " M S Ramesh could have improved the screenplay a little to become more crisper. Otherwise this film has everything to hold the audience glued to their seats. Don't miss this one!"
