= Urvashi Kalyana =

- DVD cover
- Directed by: Phani Ramachandra
- Written by: Phani Ramachandra
- Produced by: S. A. Chinne Gowda; S. A. Srinivas
- Starring: Jaggesh; Priyanka Srivastava
- Cinematography: R Manjunath
- Music by: Rajan–Nagendra
- Release date: 1993
- Country: India
- Language: Kannada

Urvashi Kalyana is a 1993 Kannada film directed by Phani Ramachandra and starring Jaggesh and Priyanka Srivastava with Doddanna, Girija Lokesh and Bank Janardhan in supporting roles. This was the first time Phani Ramachandra directed Jaggesh. The plot centers on how a man tames his shrew mother-in-law.

== Cast ==
- Jaggesh
- Priyanka Puthran as Urvashi
- K. S. Ashwath
- Doddanna
- Girija Lokesh
- Satyabhama
- Bank Janardhan
- Honnavalli Krishna
- Srilalitha as Akkayyamma
- Abhinaya as Jaggesh's younger sister

== Soundtrack ==
The soundtrack of the film was composed by Rajan–Nagendra. The lyrics were written by Chi. Udayashankar.

Urvashi Kalyana

Soundtrack album by Rajan–Nagendra
- Released: 1993
- Recorded: 1993
- Genre: Feature film soundtrack
- Length: 23:37
- Language: Kannada
- Label: Akash Audio

Rajan–Nagendra chronology
Shivanaga (1992)	Urvashi Kalyana (1993)	Jaga Mechida Huduga (1993)
External audio
- Urvashi Kalyana – Jukebox on YouTube

Track listing
No.	Title	Lyrics	Singer(s)	Length
1.	"Chaithrada Kogile Koogida Haage"	Chi. Udayashankar	S. P. Balasubrahmanyam, Manjula Gururaj	4:47
2.	"Kaligaala Idu Kaligaala"	Chi. Udayashankar	S. P. Balasubrahmanyam	4:08
3.	"Meravanige Meravanige Horatide"	Chi. Udayashankar	S. P. Balasubrahmanyam	4:50
4.	"Nan Yaaru Gotthe Geleya"	Chi. Udayashankar	S. P. Balasubrahmanyam	5:20
5.	"Ninna Nodoke Muddu Madoke"	Chi. Udayashankar	S. P. Balasubrahmanyam	4:32
Total length:				23:37
