= Thillu Mullu (disambiguation) =

Thillu Mullu is a 1981 Indian Tamil-language comedy film directed by K. Balachander.

Thillu Mullu may also refer to:

- Thillu Mullu (2013 film), a remake of the 1981 film
- Thillu Mullu (soundtrack), of the 2013 film
- Thillu Mullu, working title of Mirattal, a 2012 action comedy film
