= Nanna Ninna Prema Kathe =

- Directed by: Shivu Jamkhandi
- Written by: Shivu Jamkhandi
- Produced by: Anand S Namagouda
- Starring: Vijay Raghavendra; Nidhi Subbaiah; Thilak Shekar
- Cinematography: Mohammad Haseeb
- Edited by: Damador Kanasooru
- Music by: Shivu Jamkhandi
- Production company: AB Cinema Creations
- Release date: 15 July 2016
- Language: Kannada

Nanna Ninna Prema Kathe is a 2016 Indian Kannada romantic drama film directed by Shivu Jamkhandi and produced by actor Anand S. Namagouda. The film stars Vijay Raghavendra and Nidhi Subbaiah pairing up for the first time in lead roles whilst Thilak Shekar and Chikkanna play the key supporting roles.

Reported to be centered around Northern Karnataka, the filming took place in various parts of Karnataka including Bengaluru, Jamakhandi, Bijapur, Bagalkot, Hubballi and others. The dialogues of the film are being spoken in true North Karnataka style. The film was released on 15 July 2016.

== Cast ==
- Vijay Raghavendra as Shankara
- Nidhi Subbaiah as Rekha/Preeti
- Thilak Shekar
- Chikkanna
- Sudha Belawadi
- Gururaj Hosakote
- Suresh
- Rachana Dasharath

== Soundtrack ==
Nanna Ninna Prema Kathe

Soundtrack album by Shivu Jhamkandi
- Genre: Feature film soundtrack
- Language: Kannada
- Label: Alpha Digitech

The music for the film and soundtracks are composed by Shivu Jhamkandi. The movie is based on a true love story. The album has seven soundtracks. The soundtrack comprises songs that are sung by five actors of Kannada cinema namely Puneeth Rajkumar, Upendra, Vijay Raghavendra, Chikkanna and Nidhi Subbaiah. Prominent singer Kavita Krishnamurthy has recorded a song which is about paying tributes to all the teachers.

All lyrics are written by Shivu Jhamkandi.

Tracklist
No.	Title	Singer(s)	Length
1.	"Orchestra"	Puneeth Rajkumar
2.	"Madarangi"	Santhosh Venky
3.	"Gulabi Thotadinda"	Santhosh Venky, Sangeetha
4.	"Majabhuthaagide"	Vijay Raghavendra, Anuradha Bhat
5.	"Guruvandana"	Kavita Krishnamurthy
6.	"Aa Chandamama"	Chikkanna
7.	"Od Od Hontivri"	Upendra

== Reception ==
A critic from The Times of India wrote that "Watch this film if you're from North Karnataka, for there's something to cheer about with the ambience the film brings to the cinema hall".
