= FIR 6 to 6 =

2025 Indian action thriller film

- Theatrical release poster
- Directed by: K. V. Ramana Raj
- Produced by: Bhagya Ramesh
- Starring: Vijay Raghavendra; Siri Raju
- Cinematography: Om G.
- Edited by: Nagendra Urs
- Music by: Sathish Babu; M. S. Thyagaraja
- Production company: Yasha Films
- Release date: 28 February 2025
- Running time: 118 minutes
- Country: India
- Language: Kannada

FIR 6 to 6 is a 2025 Indian Kannada-language action thriller film directed by K. V. Ramana Raj in his directorial debut. The film stars Vijay Raghavendra and Siri Raju.

== Plot ==
Inspector Garuda (Vijay Raghavendra), a principled and determined police officer, receives a high-stakes challenge when he arrests the brother of notorious crime lord Randhawa (Yash Shetty). Prompted by the gangster, Garuda must navigate a series of deadly tests between 6 a.m. and 6 p.m. to protect innocents and bring justice. The film opens with a tense raid: Garuda races through the city streets, rushing home moments before a gang of miscreants attempts to break into his house, where his wife Jyothi (Siri Raju) is alone and terrified. As he takes action to shield her, the narrative branches into multiple simultaneous emergencies: a young couple’s elopement derails into violence, a wedding night is shocked by gang interference, and a trivial bar mishap escalates into something more sinister. These subplots unfold in parallel to Garuda’s central quest to protect Jyothi and uphold Randhawa’s challenge.

Amid the chaos, Garuda is relentlessly on the move—cracking down on miscreants, coordinating his team, and juggling time-sensitive calls. Leafing through phone contacts and checking his watch becomes a recurring visual motif, underscoring the tension of his race against time. A subplot involving a drug mafia and smuggling ring tied to Randhawa's empire introduces an added layer of peril when Garuda must dismantle a dangerous drug deal to edge closer to the gangster’s inner circle. Garuda confronts the crime lord, fights through his goons, and races to rescue Jyothi, bringing the film’s 12-hour crisis to a head.

In the end, Garuda triumphs—Randhawa’s challenges are nullified, his wife is saved, and the multiple crises are quelled. However, critics note the plot’s frenetic pacing and disjointed subplots overshadow the emotional resonance, resulting in a thriller that falters amid its ambitious, multi-threaded narrative.

== Cast ==
- Vijay Raghavendra as Inspector Garuda
- Siri Raju as Jyothi
- Nagendra Urs
- Yash Shetty as Randhawa
- Bala Rajwadi
- Comedy Khiladi Santu
- Comedy Khiladi Gaja Vidyabharan
- Adi Keshwa
- Ratan
- Yasha
- Shweta

== Production ==
Reportedly, the entire filming took place at night. The film was shot in thirty-five nights.

== Soundtrack ==
The soundtrack was composed by Sathish Babu and M. S. Thyagaraja.

Track listing
No.	Title	Lyrics	Singer(s)	Length
1.	"Kachiko Kachiko"	V. Nagendra Prasad	Aniruddha Sastry, Uma Neha	4:12
2.	"Sakha Ninna Mukhavannu"	V. Nagendra Prasad	Chethan Naik, Sarayu	4:13
Total length:				8:25

== Release ==
FIR 6 to 6 was released theatrically on 28 February 2025.

== Reception ==
Y. Maheswara Reddy of Bangalore Mirror rated the film two-and-a-half out of five stars and wrote, "Raj has tried to say so many things at once, without realising the futility of such efforts and methods. The director has failed to realise the importance of a crisp screenplay and narration that is not all muddled up." Shashiprasad SM of Times Now gave it two out of five stars and wrote, "The film is a chaotic thriller that struggles to find its footing. Disjointed subplots, a weak screenplay and a lack of emotional depth make it a tedious watch."

A. Sharadhaa of Cinema Express gave it two out of five stars and wrote, "The film attempts to juggle too many themes—from family drama to elopement, drug mafias to cop chases— but fails to execute any of them effectively. With underwhelming performances and a convoluted storyline, FIR 6 to 6 ends up as a tedious and forgettable watch." Critics from Udayavani and Vijayavani found the screenplay to be average.
