= Thillu Mullu (soundtrack) =

Soundtrack album to Thillu Mullu by M. S. Viswanathan and Yuvan Shankar Raja
- Released: 1 June 2013
- Recorded: 2013
- Genre: Feature film soundtrack
- Length: 23:06
- Language: Tamil
- Label: Saregama
- Producers: M. S. Viswanathan; Yuvan Shankar Raja

M. S. Viswanathan chronology
Valiban Sutrum Ulagam (2008)	Thillu Mullu (2013)	Suvadugal (2013)

Yuvan Shankar Raja chronology
Thanga Meenkal (2013)	Thillu Mullu (2013)	Biriyani (2013)

Thillu Mullu is the soundtrack album to the 2013 film of the same name directed by Badri and produced by Vendhar Movies starring Shiva and Isha Talwar; a remake of the eponymous 1981 Tamil film, which itself is a remake of the Hindi film Gol Maal (1979). The film's soundtrack featured five songs which were composed by M. S. Viswanathan and Yuvan Shankar Raja; two songs from the original film were retained as well. The soundtrack was released under the Saregama label on 1 June 2013.

== Development ==
"The legendary Viswanathan had composed the music for the original Thillu Mullu and since we wanted to retain two of the old compositions, we wanted him on the team. At the same time, we also wanted to add a bit of freshness, something new and more suited to the present-day audience. Yuvan Shankar Raja seemed to be the perfect choice for that."

— Shiva, on the music of Thillu Mullu

The original film's composer M. S. Viswanathan collaborated with Yuvan Shankar Raja for composing the remake. Two songs from the original film — "Thillu Mullu" and "Ragangal Pathinaaru" — have been retained for the film. The song "Thillu Mullu" was remixed by Yuvan as he wanted to "give the original theme music a contemporary sound" while "Ragangal Pathinaaru" remained untouched. Viswanathan composed the tunes, with Yuvan orchestrating and recording them. Yuvan further composed two fresh tunes to suit the modern-day audience and also having a bit of freshness.

== Release ==
The audio launch was held on 1 June 2013 at the Victoria Hall in Geneva, Switzerland, along with the audios of Nalanum Nandhiniyum and Sutta Kadhai. The cast and crew of all those films felicitated the event with T. R. Paarivendhar, politician and founder-chairman of SRM Institute of Science and Technology, Chennai presided as the chief guest.

== Track listing ==
No.	Title	Lyrics	Music	Singer(s)	Length
1.	"Thillu Mullu Remix"	Kannadasan	M. S. Viswanathan, Yuvan Shankar Raja	M. S. Viswanathan, Yuvan Shankar Raja, Rajeev 'Tha Prophecy'	3:51
2.	"Kai Pesi"	Vaali	Yuvan Shankar Raja	Ranjith	5:07
3.	"Aajaa Aajaa"	Na. Muthukumar	Yuvan Shankar Raja	Haricharan, Priya Himesh	4:50
4.	"Ragangal Padhinaru"	Kannadasan	M. S. Viswanathan	Karthik	4:38
5.	"Thillu Mullu"	Kannadasan	M. S. Viswanathan	S. P. Balasubrahmanyam	4:40
Total length:					23:06

== Reception ==
Karthik Srinivasan of Milliblog called it as a "frothy and pleasant soundtrack", barring "Raagangal" which he felt that it "sounds at best like Doordarshan's card board stage orchestra version" despite complimenting Karthik's vocals. Srinivasa Ramanujam of The Times of India, in his three-star review, noted that the title track featuring Viswanathan and Yuvan's vocals were "an interesting combination in terms of singers" adding that "the peppy tune, the rap elements and the pleasing backgrounds work in its favour." He further described "Kai Pesi" as a "slow melody" while "Aajaa Aajaa" was comparatively similar to "Poongatre Poongatre" from Paiyaa (2010). Ramanujam added that "Raagangal Pathinaaru" "takes you on a trip down memory lane due to its old-world charm" with "[Karthik's] rendition and appropriate improvisation give this number the right flavour."

Vivek Ramanathan of In.com wrote "Music by M.S.Viswanathan and Yuvan Shankar Raja are good. The lively opening 'Thillu Mullu' remix track peps up the proceedings but the same cannot be said for other songs. Although the songs are not bad, the situation in which they are inserted into the script is amateurish and it definitely hampers the pace of the movie." Sify wrote "The music of Yuvan is ok and the MSV-Yuvan title song is fabulous. Out of six songs, two are taken from the earlier version and out of the remaining four composed by Yuvan the soft Kaipesi En Kooda.., is pick of the lot".

S. Saraswathi of Rediff.com wrote "Thillu Mullu’smusic is jointly composed by the legendary M S Viswanathan, who composed the music for the original Thillu Mullu, and Yuvan Shankar Raja. Two of the original compositions have been retained and are perhaps the highlight of the film. The song Thillu Mullu with lyrics by Vaali has been given a new twist by Canadian rapper Tha Prophecy. The song has been picturised on both Yuvan and M S Vishwanath, making it more interesting. Raagangal Pathinaru, another all time favourite too has been retained and is beautifully picturised on the lead pair, Shiva and the slim and svelte Isha."
