= Grey Games =

Indian thriller drama film

- Theatrical release poster
- Directed by: Gangadhar Salimath
- Written by: Gangadhar Salimath
- Story by: Anand H. Mugad
- Produced by: Anand H. Mugad
- Starring: Vijay Raghavendra; Shruti Prakash; Bhavana Rao; Aparna Vastarey; Ravi Bhat; Ishita Singh; Jai
- Cinematography: Varun DK
- Edited by: Jagadeesh N
- Music by: Songs: Shriyansh Shreeram; Ashwin Hemanth; Atrangi Funkaar; Score: Ashwin Hemanth
- Production company: Dees Films
- Release date: 10 May 2024
- Running time: 130 minutes
- Country: India
- Language: Kannada

Grey Games is a 2024 Indian Kannada-language thriller drama film written and directed by Gangadhar Salimath. The film stars Vijay Raghavendra, Shruti Prakash, Bhavana Rao, Aparna Vastarey, Ravi Bhat, Ishita Singh, and Jai.

== Cast ==
- Vijay Raghavendra as Ram
- Shruti Prakash as Shanaya
- Bhavana Rao as Kalpana
- Aparna Vastarey as Tara, Abhi's mother
- Ravi Bhat as Sridhar, Abhi's father
- Ishita Singh as Julie
- Jai as Abhi

== Production ==
=== Development ===
Anand H. Mugad conceived the story, exploring the notion of a gamer entering a virtual world. This concept evolved into Grey Games, which director Gangadhar Salimath further developed into a narrative, incorporating real-life incidents, including a notable case in Mangalore where a young boy killed his online gaming rival. Anand H. Mugad produced the film under the banner of Dees Films. In August 2021, the film was announced, featuring Vijay Raghavendra as Ram, a psychologist. Vijay's nephew, Jai, was cast as a twenty-year-old gamer, marking his acting debut. The film also stars Shruti Prakash as Shanaya, a film actress, and Bhavana Rao as Kalpana, a cybercrime investigation officer. Additionally, television presenter Aparna Vastarey plays the role of the mother.

=== Filming ===
The film's title was unveiled on 8 October 2021, with a muhurat shot pooja ceremony. The film was primarily shot in Bangalore. The film's gaming sequences were created using Epic Games' Unreal Engine. The film received a U/A certificate from the Central Board of Film Certification.

== Soundtrack ==
Grey Games

Soundtrack album by Shriyansh Shreeram, Ashwin Hemanth, Atrangi Funkaar Score: Ashwin Hemanth
- Released: 2024
- Genre: Feature film soundtrack
- Length: 14:50
- Language: Kannada
- Label: Anand Audio

Video Songs Jukebox
- Grey Games – Video Songs Jukebox on YouTube

The soundtrack consists of the songs composed by Shriyansh Shreeram, Ashwin Hemanth and Atrangi Funkaar.

Track listing
No.	Title	Lyrics	Singer(s)	Length
1.	"Paravasha"	Kiran Kaverappa	Pancham Jeeva	4:14
2.	"Manaselede (Male Version)"	Kiran Kaverappa	Pancham Jeeva	3:57
3.	"Ramma"	Brrithheve, Gangadhar Salimath	Ashwin, Brrithheve	2:38
4.	"Manaselede (Female Version)"	Kiran Kaverappa	Aishwarya Rangarajan	4:01
Total length:				14:50

== Release ==
The film was released theatrically on 10 May 2024.

== Reception ==
Jagadish Angadi of Deccan Herald rated the film three-and-a-half out of five stars and wrote that "The flick raises questions about individual perception of contexts and moral concepts of being right and wrong. Vijay Raghavendra delivers a stellar performance. Aparna Vastarey takes on a powerful role and is absolutely convincing." Shashiprasad SM of Times Now gave it three out of five stars and wrote, "Every game ends with a winner and a loser. This game -- Grey Games-- wins in the end for its good content despite having its own share of ups and downs." Y Maheswara Reddy of Bangalore Mirror gave it three-and-a-half out of five stars and wrote that "The movie is worth a watch for all those who enjoy gripping narratives."

Pramod Mohan Hegde of The Times of India gave it three out of five stars and wrote, "Grey Games is a unique attempt, at least for Kannada cinema, and the thriller-genre film manages to keep the audience hooked to the screen, sans a few scenes. The movie could have been shortened by 15 minutes to make it a bit more interesting." Sunayana Suresh of The South First rated the film two-and-a-half out of five stars and wrote that "Grey Games had the potential to be something new and different in the cinemascope, given it deals with cyber crimes that aren’t often spoken about on screen. But the old-school treatment of the plot does not work. But, some of the performances of the lead actors make it a tolerable watch."
