= Kanninum Kannadikkum =

- Directed by: Sundar Das
- Written by: Haridas Karivellur
- Produced by: Biju Narayanan, AR Kannan
- Starring: Kalabhavan Mani; Monica; Siddique; Bala Singh
- Cinematography: Ramachandra Babu; K. P Nambiyathiri
- Edited by: L Bhomminathan
- Music by: M. Jayachandran; S.P Venkatesh (Score)
- Release date: 6 February 2004
- Country: India
- Language: Malayalam

Kanninum Kannadikkum is a 2004 Indian Malayalam language film directed by Sunderdas and starring Kalabhavan Mani and Monica. The film was dubbed in Tamil as Pura.

== Cast ==
- Kalabhavan Mani as Praav / Maniyan
- Monica as Abhirami
- Siddique as Harikrishnan
- Sona Nair as Radha
- Jagathy Sreekumar as Pushkaran
- Janardanan as Narayan
- Bala Singh as Varadaraja Mallar
- Sudheesh as Murugan
- Rajasenan in Guest Appearance
- Prabhu as himself in Guest Appearance
- Sukanya in Guest Appearance
- Bindu Panicker as Saudamini
- Indrans as MA Chendamangalam
- Seema G. Nair as Pushkaran's wife
- KTS Padannayil as Mooppan
- Bhavani as Abhirami's mother
- Spadikam George as himself
- Ponnamma Babu as herself
- Irshad as Abhirami's husband
- Anu Joseph as Chembarathy
- Geetha Salam as Jyolsyar
- Vishnu Unnikrishnan
- Pradeep Kottayam

== Soundtrack ==
Music: M. Jayachandran, Lyrics: S. Ramesan Nair

- "Kaithozhaam" – K. S. Chitra
- "Maarikolunthe Manakkanathenth" – Kalabhavan Mani
- "Nilaakkili" – Ramesh Murali
- "Pachakkilipadu" – K. K. Nishad
- "Thanichirikkumbam" (F) – K. S. Chitra
- "Thanichirikkumbam" (M) – K. J. Yesudas
- "Thanichirikkumbam" (D) – K. J. Yesudas, K. S. Chitra
- "Thennalile" (D) – M. G. Sreekumar, Sujatha Mohan
- "Thennalile" (F) – Sujatha Mohan

== Reception ==
A critic from Sify criticised the film's excessive use of Tamil and praised Kalabhavan Mani's performance.
