= Second Case of Seetharam =

2026 Indian Kannada-language thriller film

- Directed by: Devi Prasad Shetty
- Screenplay by: Devi Prasad Shetty
- Story by: Devi Prasad Shetty
- Produced by: Devi Prasad Shetty; Sathvik Hebbar
- Starring: Vijay Raghavendra; Gopalkrishna Deshpande; Sagar Puranik; Usha Bhandary
- Cinematography: Hemanth Acharya
- Edited by: Shashank Narayana
- Music by: Navaneeth Sham
- Production company: Flying Elephant Story Tellers
- Distributed by: Janani Pictures
- Release date: 20 February 2026
- Country: India
- Language: Kannada

Second Case of Seetharam is a 2026 Indian Kannada-language suspense thriller written, directed and co-produced by Devi Prasad Shetty along with Sathvik Hebbar under the banner, Flying Elephant Story Tellers. It stars Vijay Raghavendra as Seetharam, along with Gopalkrishna Deshpande, Sagar Puranik and Usha Bhandary in pivotal roles. The film serves as a sequel to Seetharam Benoy Case No. 18 (2021) and continues the story of Inspector Seetharam.

== Plot ==
Seetharam, an upright and principled sub-inspector, is transferred from Haveri to the rural Aanegadde police station in Shivamogga district. After resolving a previous case, he is assigned to investigate a series of brutal murders that appear to follow no clear pattern. As bodies continue to surface, forensic analysis suggests that the killings may be the work of a psychotic serial offender.

The story starts with having a bitter past with his sister who was thrown away from home because of her love interest. Seetharam though having close relationship with his sister, stands helpless because of his strict father when she returns home being pregnant. Being abandoned by her own father and brother she stops talking to them.

Seetharam and his team attempt to identify patterns, motives, and connections among the victims, encountering multiple suspects along the way. However, each apparent breakthrough leads to further complications, with new murders continuing to challenge the investigation. Parallel to the case, Seetharam grapples with unresolved personal issues, particularly his strained relationship with his estranged sister. As the investigation deepens, links between the crimes and past traumas emerge, complicating both the professional and emotional aspects of his pursuit.

The narrative culminates in a confrontation that reveals the psychological motivations behind the killings and resolves the identity of the perpetrator, while also addressing Seetharam’s personal journey.

== Cast ==
- Vijay Raghavendra as Seetharam
- Gopalkrishna Deshpande as Sebastian
- Usha Bhandary as Seetharam's sister
- Sagar Puranik as Shiva
- Pradeep Anche as Doctor
- Madhusudhan Gatte as Jayanna
- Aravind Shetty
- Rajesh Keelambi
- Munaf
- Mathew Surani
- Ananth Bhat
- Manjunath
- Shanmugam
- Nataraj Aralasurali
- Sridhar Shimoga
- Sudheendra Rao
- Latha Rajkumar
- Aishwarya Nagaraj
- Sushma Honnalli
- Fathima Rodrigues

== Production ==
The film was developed as a sequel to Seetharam Benoy Case No. 18 (2021), continuing the investigative narrative centered on Inspector Seetharam. The project was written and directed by Devi Prasad Shetty, who retained creative control over the screenplay and story. Vijay Raghavendra reprised his role as Inspector Seetharam, marking his continued collaboration with director Shetty. Supporting roles were played by actors including Gopalkrishna Deshpande and Usha Bhandary.

=== Filming ===
Principal photography was carried out in Karnataka, with the story set in the fictional town of Anegadde, depicted through rural and semi-urban locations. The cinematography was handled by Hemanth Acharya, and editing was done by Shashank Narayana.

== Music ==
The film's music was composed by Navaneeth Sham and lyrics written by Pawan Wadeyar and Thrilok Thrivikram.

=== Tracklist ===
- "Jagavella Neene" - Rajath Hegde
- "Urulo Kalave" - Vijay Raghavendra

== Release ==
The film theatrically released on 20 February 2026

=== Streaming rights ===
This movie was later streamed on Amazon Prime Video from 17 April 2026 in Kannada , Tamil and Hindi And it also released on Lionsgate Play on 3 July 2026 in Kannada , Tamil and Hindi

== Reception ==
The film received mixed-to-positive reviews from critics. It was described as a “solid blend of suspense and substance,” with particular praise for Vijay Raghavendra’s restrained performance and the film’s psychological approach to its antagonist.

Some reviewers highlighted the film as an engaging slow-burn thriller that improves as it progresses, though the early portions were noted for relying on genre clichés. Others criticized the film for pacing issues, stating that while the procedural elements were competently handled, the overall narrative lacked intensity and emotional depth.
