= Masanada Hoovu =

- CD cover
- Directed by: Puttanna Kanagal
- Written by: T. R. Subba Rao
- Screenplay by: Puttanna Kanagal
- Based on: Masanada Hoovu by T. R. Subba Rao
- Produced by: B. S. Gayathri; S. P. Sarvotthama Kanagal
- Starring: Jayanthi; Ambareesh; Hema Chaudhary; Aparna
- Cinematography: S. Maruthi Rao
- Edited by: V. P. Krishna
- Music by: Vijaya Bhaskar
- Distributed by: Anugraha Movie Makers
- Release date: 1985
- Running time: 133 minutes
- Country: India
- Language: Kannada

Masanada Hoovu ( transl. Graveyard Flower) is a 1985 Indian Kannada language film directed by Puttanna Kanagal, based on T. R. Subba Rao's novel of the same name. It introduces Aparna and stars Jayanthi, Ambareesh, Vijayalakshmi Singh and Hema Choudhary in key roles. Puttanna Kanagal died before filming was complete. His friend and long time associate, director K. S. L. Swamy, completed the film. Masanada Hoovu won multiple awards at the 1985-86 Karnataka State Film Awards including Best Actress (Jayanthi) and Best Supporting Actor.

Padma Vasanthi had originally been signed to play one of the roles and even learnt roller skating for the same. After Kanagal's death, the same role was enacted by Vijayalakshmi Singh and a bicycle replaced the roller skates. Chandrika who would become a lead actress in the 90s plays a small role in the movie under her real name Sribharathi.

== Cast ==
- Jayanthi as Taradevi
- Ambareesh as Singaru
- Aparna as Parvati
- Vijayalakshmi Singh as Shanta
- Hema Choudhary as Amba
- Lokanath
- Mukhyamantri Chandru
- Doddanna
- Sivakumar
- Sihi Kahi Geetha
- Chandrika (credited as Sribharathi)

== Production ==
Aparna, who went on to become a television presenter, made her acting debut with this film.

== Soundtrack ==
| Track # | Song | Singer(s) |
|---|---|---|
| 1 | "O Gunavantha" | S. Janaki |
| 2 | "Kannada Nadina Karavali" | P. Jayachandran, Vani Jairam |
| 3 | "Uppina Sagaraku" | P Jayachandran, Vani Jairam |
| 4 | "Yaava Kaanike Needali" | S. P. Balasubrahmanyam |
| 5 | "Masanada Hoovendu Neeneke" | S P Balasubrahmanyam |

== Reception ==
The Hindu listed this film alongside five other films for which Ambareesh earned critical acclaim for his acting.

== Awards ==
- Karnataka State Film Awards 1985-86
  - Best Actress – Jayanthi
  - Best Supporting Actor – Ambareesh
  - Best Dialogue Writer – T. G. Ashwatha Narayana
  - Best Cinematographer – S. Maruthi Rao
  - Best Sound Recording – C. D. Vishwanath
  - Special Award (Art Director) – Arun D. Godgaonkar
