= Paradesi C/o London =

Indian Kannada-language romantic drama film

- Theatrical release poster
- Directed by: M Rajashekar
- Screenplay by: M Rajashekar
- Story by: M Rajashekar
- Produced by: B Badari Narayana
- Starring: Vijay Raghavendra; Raashi Mahadev
- Cinematography: H K Chidanand
- Edited by: K M Prakash
- Music by: Veer Samarth
- Production company: BVS Movies
- Release date: 28 December 2018
- Country: India
- Language: Kannada

Paradesi C/o London (transl. Foreigner in London) is a 2018 Indian Kannada-language romantic drama film directed by M. Rajasekhar and starring Vijay Raghavendra and Raashi Mahadev in her debut.

== Cast ==
- Vijay Raghavendra as Ram
- Raashi Mahadev as Swathi
- Rangayana Raghu as Kenche Gowda
- Tabla Nani
- Prashanth Siddi as Siddha
- Mohan Juneja
- Bhaskar
- Shobaraj
- Suchendra Prasad
- Danny Kuttappa
- Petrol Prasanna
- M. S. Umesh as doctor
- Pooja Hunasuru
- Ramakrishna
- Kuri Sunil
- Pavan Maja Talkies
- Sangeetha
- Manjula Reddy
- Kumuda

== Production ==
According to the director, the film takes into account both meanings of Paradesi, which can mean a foreigner or a native person. The film was shot in Ballari, Bengaluru, Mangalore, Mysore and Siraguppa.

== Soundtrack ==
The music was composed by Veer Samarth with lyrics by V. Nagendra Prasad, Kaviraj, Yogaraj Bhat, and Shivu Beragi.

1. "Hagalalli Nodidara" - Ravindra Soragavi, Shamitha Malnad
2. "Kashta Patt" - Vijay Prakash
3. "Dhana Dhana Ghante" - Shashank Sheshagiri, Kannada Kogile Gangamma
4. "Arey Rey" - Deepak Doddera, Anuradha Bhat
5. "Kanasellavu" - Hemanth Kumar

== Reception ==
Kavya Christopher of The Times of India wrote, "Tailored to be a situational comedy, the story has its share of drama and emotional connections. The script allows scope for the few number of song and dance as well as fight sequences to cater to those who enjoy the larger-than-life scenarios that give you a break from reality". A critic from Chitratara.com wrote, "This is a Pukka (transl. pure) commercial film with love, action, thrill, comedy following at regular intervals".
