= Monica (Tamil actress) =

Indian actress

- Born: Rekha Maruthiraj; 25 August 1985 (age 41); Kottayam, Kerala, India
- Other names: Parvana; M. G. Rahima
- Occupation: Actress
- Years active: 1990–1999 (Child artist); 2001–2014
- Spouse: Malik (m. 2015)
- Parents: Maruthi Raj (father); Gracy (mother)

Monica (born 25 August 1985) is an Indian former actress, who starred predominantly in Tamil language films. A child actor in the early 1990s, she mostly appeared in supporting roles, before taking lead roles from the late 2000s on. She is probably best known for performances in the films Azhagi, Imsai Arasan 23m Pulikesi and Silandhi. In 2012, she changed her name to Parvana for Malayalam films. In 2014, she converted to Islam, changing her name to M. G. Raheema, and announced that she had quit acting.

== Personal life ==
On 30 May 2014, Monica embraced Islam with her new name M. G. Raheema where M is Maruthi Raj (father) and G is Gracy (mother). Monika's father is Hindu and mother is a Christian.

Rahima married Malik, a Chennai-based entrepreneur who hails from Salem. Malik is into import and export of electronic items.

== Filmography ==
Year	Movie	Role	Language	Notes
1990	Avasara Police 100		Tamil	Child actress
1991	Uncle Bun	Maria	Malayalam	Child actress
1991	Bramma		Tamil	Child actress
1992	Chanti		Telugu	Child actress
1992	Endrum Anbudan	Mallu	Tamil	Child actress
1992	Pandiyan	Priya	Tamil	Child actress
1993	Sakkarai Devan		Tamil	Child actress
1994	En Aasai Machan	Thayamma (child)	Tamil	Winner, Tamil Nadu State Film Award for Best Child Star
1994	Maindhan		Tamil	Child actress
1994	Manju Virattu	Poovazhagi (child)	Tamil	Child actress
1994	Varavu Ettana Selavu Pathana	Patma	Tamil	Child actress
1995	Sathi Leelavathi		Tamil	Child actress
1995	Indira	Younger Indira	Tamil	Child actress
1995	Chellakannu	Younger Chandra	Tamil	Child actress
1997	Iruvar	Manimegalai	Tamil	Child actress
1997	Pasamulla Pandiyare		Tamil	Child actress
1998	Moovendhar	Uma's sister	Tamil	Child actress
2001	Theerthadanam	Younger Vinodhini	Malayalam	Child Actress
2001	Love Channel	Rajeswari	Tamil	Debut as Heroine
2001	12B	Shakti's coworker	Tamil	
2002	Azhagi	Younger Dhanalakshmi	Tamil	
2002	Kadhal Azhivathillai	Monica	Tamil	
2002	Phantom Pailey	Hema	Malayalam	
2002	Siva Rama Raju	Swathi	Telugu	
2002	Otte Ee Ammai Evaru Teleedu	Savitri	Telugu	
2002	Bagavathi	Priya	Tamil	
2003	Banda Paramasivam	Shenbagam	Tamil	
2003	Maa Alludu Very Good	Meghana	Telugu	
2003	Inidhu Inidhu Kadhal Inidhu	Deepika	Tamil	
2004	Kanninum Kannadikkum	Abhirami	Malayalam	
2004	Koduku	Usha	Telugu	
2005	Are		Telugu	
2005	Daas	Punitha	Tamil	
2005	Sandakozhi	Balu's cousin	Tamil	
2005	Selvam		Tamil	
2006	Imsai Arasan 23rd Pulikecei	Vasantha Sundari	Tamil	
2006	Paisalo Paramatma		Telugu	
2007	Chilanthy		Malayalam	
2008	Thodakkam	Gayathri	Tamil	
2008	Rosa Kale	Nimsara	Sinhala	
2008	Silandhi	Monika	Tamil	
2009	A Aa E Ee	Anitha	Tamil	
2009	Devaru Kotta Thangi	Gowri	Kannada	
2010	Gowravargal	Poongodi	Tamil	
2010	Hrudayadalli Idenidu	Geetha	Kannada	
2011	Muthukku Muthaaga	Annamayil	Tamil	
2011	Nanjupuram	Malar	Tamil	
2011	Varnam	Kavitha	Tamil	
2011	Kalla Malla Sulla	Pooja	Kannada	
2012	916	Lekshmi	Malayalam	
2013	Kurumbukara Pasanga	Sindhu	Tamil	
2013	Benki Birugali		Kannada	
2013	Suvadugal		Tamil	
2013	Jannal Oram	Bus Conductress	Tamil	
2014	Thalaivan		Tamil	
2014	Ninaithathu Yaaro	Herself	Tamil	Cameo appearance
2014	Madipakkam Madhavan	Herself	Tamil	Guest appearance
2015	Nathikal Nanaivathillai		Tamil	
2016	Meera Jaakirathai	Meera	Tamil	
