= Kotreshi Kanasu =

- Film poster
- Directed by: Nagathihalli Chandrashekar
- Written by: Kum. Veerabhadrappa
- Based on: Kotra Highschoolige Seriddu by Kum. Veerabhadrappa
- Produced by: G. Nanda Kumar
- Starring: Vijay Raghavendra; Karibasavaiah; Umashree
- Cinematography: Sunny Joseph
- Edited by: Suresh Urs
- Music by: C. Aswath
- Distributed by: Vishwapriya Films
- Release date: 1994
- Running time: 124 minutes
- Country: India
- Language: Kannada

Kotreshi Kanasu (transl. Dream of Kotreshi) is a 1994 Indian Kannada language film directed by Nagathihalli Chandrashekar starring Vijay Raghavendra and Karibasavaiah.

The film won two National Film Awards at 42nd National Film Awards; Best Feature Film in Kannada and Best Child Artist (Vijay Raghavendra).

== Plot ==
Kotra is a vibrant young boy belonging to the lower caste, loved and admired by the entire village even the upper class for his intelligence. Kotra's passing the 7th standard is celebrated with gusto among the lower caste which hurts the pride of the upper caste. Kotra and his father lost jobs. Even his friends move away making him lonely and desolate. Kotra decides not to join High School thinking that normality would be restored, but his parents dreams are shattered.

Kotra's desire to pursue his studies rekindles. Their community greets his decision but the upper caste tries to put obstacles to his admission. To fight for justice Kotra's father goes on a fast unto death. The local leaders take Kotra to the city to seek justice through the Government officials.

Kotra attracts the attention of the Minister and gets admission in the high school.

== Cast ==
- Vijay Raghavendra as Kotra (credited as Master Vijay Raghavendra)
- Karibasavaiah as Dibba (Kotra's Father)
- Umashree Kotra's Mother
- H. G. Dattatreya
- B. Jayashree
- Sunder Raj
- Pramila Joshai
- Vishnuvardhan in a cameo appearance as Education Minister of Government of Karnataka

== Awards ==
- National Film Award for Best Feature Film in Kannada
- National Film Award for Best Child Artist - Vijay Raghavendra
