= Kaddha Chitra =

- Theatrical release poster
- Directed by: Suhas Krishna
- Produced by: Suhas D.
- Starring: Vijay Raghavendra; Namratha Surendranath
- Cinematography: Sri Crazy Mindz
- Music by: Krishna Raj
- Release date: 8 September 2023
- Country: India
- Language: Kannada

Kaddha Chitra is a 2023 Indian Kannada-language film directed by Suhas Krishna and starring Vijay Raghavendra, Namratha Surendranath, Baby Aradhya, Raghu Shivamogga, and Balaji Manohar. The film was produced by Suhas D. And Sandeep H.K and the music composed by Krishna Raj. It was theatrically released on 8 September 2023.

== Cast ==
- Vijay Raghavendra as Vijay Kshatriya
- Namratha Surendranath as Aditi
- Baby Aradhya
- Raghu Shivamogga
- Balaji Manohar

== Music ==
The music was composed by Krishna Raj.

Track listing
No.	Title	Lyrics	Singer(s)	Length
1.	"Modala Maleya"	Madhukiran R.	Sooraj Santhosh	3:36
2.	"Alli Nodu Ganesha Illi Nodu Ganesha"	Suhas Krishna, Vinay Kumar	Suhas Krishna, Vinay Kumar	3:09
Total length:				6:45

== Reception ==
A. Sharadhaa from The New Indian Express wrote, "One, the film’s use of plagiarism as a plot device to introduce a crime angle feels underdeveloped and lacks justification. Moreover, the intriguing elements that initially pique one’s interest ultimately become a mystery in themselves, leaving the audience perplexed". Y Maheswara Reddy from Bangalore Mirror stated, "Kaddha Chitra” may appeal to die hard fans of Vijay Raghavendra, particularly those interested in seeing him in unconventional roles. Namrata Surendranath presents an appealing and charming presence on screen. Baby Aradhya also delivers a commendable performance, showcasing her acting skills". A reviewer from Udayavani wrote, "Vijay Raghavendra draws attention in his role of carrying various emotions like happiness, sadness, pain, anger, regret. Other than that, the film's music and cinematography are perfect for the story".
