= Kollura Sri Mookambika =

- Directed by: Renuka Sharma
- Written by: Chi. Udaya Shankar
- Screenplay by: Chi. Udaya Shankar
- Produced by: Renuka Sharma
- Starring: Sridhar; Bhavya; Vajramuni
- Cinematography: S. V. Srikanth
- Edited by: K. Balu
- Music by: P. Mahadevan
- Production company: Sri Annapoorneshwari Creations
- Release date: 1993
- Running time: 138 minutes
- Country: India
- Language: Kannada

Kollura Sri Mookambika is a 1993 Indian Kannada-language Hindu mythological film, directed and produced by Renuka Sharma. Chi. Udaya Shankar has written the story and screenplay and Pughalendi Mahadevan has scored the music. The film stars Sridhar, Bhavya and Vajramuni. The film is centered on the Goddess Mookambika.

The film won State Film Awards in Art direction category.

== Cast ==
- Vajramuni as Kamhasura alias Mookasura
- Bhavya as Chandraprabha, Wife of Kamhasura
- Sridhar as Lord Shiva
- Ramakrishna as Narada
- Srijyothi as Goddess Mookambika / Lakshmi / Parvathi / Dakshayini
- Anand as Lord Vishnu
- Vijay Kashi as Lord Brahma
- Umashree as Goddess Saraswati
- Mukhyamantri Chandru as Sudharma Maharaja of Vidharba
- Srinivasa Murthy as Asura Guru Shukracharya
- Doddanna as Daksha
- Thoogudeepa Srinivas as Kamhasura Father
- Master Anand as Child Kamhasura
- Vijay Raghavendra as Shankaracharya
- Nagesh Babu as Veerabhadra
- Shivakumar as Indra
- Vijaykashi as Lord Brahma
- Sadashiva Brahmavar as Kola Maharishi
- Shivaprakash as Mantri
- Sihi Kahi Chandru as Devashilpi Mayasura

== Soundtrack ==
| S. No. | Song title | Singer(s) | Lyrics |
|---|---|---|---|
| 1 | "Kanasinali Banda" | K. S. Chithra | Chi. Udayashankar |
| 2 | "Sarvamangale" | Chorus | Chi. Udaya Shankar |
| 3 | "Namo Devadevam" | S. P. Balasubrahmanyam | Chi. Udaya Shankar |
| 4 | "Oh Janani" | S. P. Balasubrahmanyam | Chi. Udaya Shankar |
| 5 | "Amma Daye Baradenu" | K. S. Chithra | Chi. Udaya Shankar |
| 6 | "Gedde Yamananu" | S. P. Balasubrahmanyam | Chi. Udaya Shankar |
| 7 | "Namasthesthu Mahamaye" | B. R. Chaya | Adi Shankaracharya |
| 8 | "Jaya Mangalam" | S. P. Balasubrahmanyam | Chi. Udaya Shankar |
| 9 | "Kodachadri Shikaradalli" | S. P. Balasubrahmanyam | Vijayanarasimha |
| 10 | "Thillana" | Chandrika Gururaj, Manjula Paramesh | Vijayanarasimha |
