= Meera Madhava Raghava =

- Directed by: T. N. Seetharam
- Screenplay by: T. N. Seetharam; S. Surendranath
- Starring: Diganth; Ramya; Tilak
- Cinematography: H. M. Ramachandra
- Edited by: Suresh Urs
- Music by: Hamsalekha
- Production company: Bhoomika Chithra (Bangalore) Pvt Ltd
- Release date: 27 July 2007
- Running time: 140 minutes
- Country: India
- Language: Kannada

Meera Madhava Raghava is a 2007 Indian Kannada language film directed by T. N. Seetharam starring Ramya, Diganth and Tilak Shekar. The film, though well received by the critics, did not perform well at the box-office.

== Plot ==
Meera (Ramya) a singer and Madhava (Diganth) a lecturer get married. Meera sacrifices her dream of becoming a big singer to support her husband who dreams to be an IAS officer. She is forced to borrow money from a rowdy Raghava (Tilak), who wanted to marry her. Meera forges her husband's signature to get money from Raghava. Time flies by and Madhava becomes a sincere IAS officer targeting corrupt elements of the society. This brings him in direct conflict with Raghava, who wants to contest elections. It is payback time for Meera with consequences being too harsh for her to handle. How she faces everything and becomes a winner forms the rest of the story.

== Cast ==
- Ramya as Meera
- Diganth as Madhava
- Tilak Shekar as Raghava
- Sudha Belawadi
- Sundar Raj
- Mandya Ramesh
- Master Anand

== Soundtrack ==
No.	Title	Singer(s)	Length
1.	"Bhoomi Baanu"	Anuradha Bhat	5:16
2.	"Vasantha Vasantha"	Rajesh Krishnan, Anuradha Bhat	5:16
3.	"Ninna Nenape"	Supriya Acharya, Fayaz Khan	6:34
4.	"Bellulevva Bellulli"	Chaitra H. G.
5.	"Radheya Nodalu Banda"	Harsha, Anuradha Bhat
6.	"Olle Time Banthamma"	Hemanth, Indu Nagaraj, Lakshmi Nataraj, Supriya Acharya

== Reception ==
A critic from The Times of India wrote that "There is freshness in narration combined with adventure, romance, and sentiment. But the director seems to have a small-screen hangover with many scenes resembling a TV serial". A critic from Sify wrote that "Meera Madhava Raghava is yet another clean family entertainer. T.N.Seetharam the popular mega television serial director who knows the pulse of middle-class audiences has entered the big screen with this film". A critic from Rediff.com wrote that "MMR is worth a watch for its terrific story content and brilliant performance by Tilak".
