= Tunturu (film) =

Indian romantic thriller film

- Poster
- Directed by: Mussanje Mahesh
- Written by: Mussanje Mahesh (Dialogues); Gangu-Gayaz (Story & screenplay)
- Produced by: Somashekar Devanahalli
- Starring: Ramesh Aravind; Anu Prabhakar; Rishika Singh; Anil
- Cinematography: Nagesh Acharaya
- Edited by: E S Eshwar
- Music by: Sridhar Sambhram
- Production companies: Thibbadevi Enterprises; Kumar Movies
- Release date: 16 February 2018
- Country: India
- Language: Kannada

Tunturu (transl. Drizzle) is a 2018 Indian Kannada-language romantic thriller film directed by Mussanje Mahesh and starring Ramesh Aravind, Anu Prabhakar, Rishika Singh and Anil.

== Plot ==
Sneha and her boyfriend Ani are college students. Sneha lives with her brother and her sister-in-law, Sandhya. One day, both Sneha and Ani are kidnapped. How Sneha's brother and Sandhya set out to save them forms the rest of the story.

== Cast ==
- Ramesh Aravind
- Anu Prabhakar as Sandhya
- Somashekar
- Rishika Singh as Sneha
- Anil as Ani
- Naveen Gowda
- Akshatha Shetty
- Sonu
- Jaideep
- James
- Papu
- Kushi
- Aruna
- Deepa
- Dinesh
- Romi
- Shashi

== Production ==
The film began production in December 2011. Ramesh Aravind and Anu Prabhakar, who have paired together in several films, play the role of a mature couple, which is a contrast to their earlier films together. Rishika Singh plays a national level swimmer and Ramesh Aravind's brother while Anil plays her love interest. This was the third film that Rishika Singh signed and she only accepted the film due to the length of her role. As of May 2012, the film's shooting was complete except for the songs and the climax scene.

== Soundtrack ==
The music is composed by Sridhar Sambhram.

Track listing
| No. | Title | Singer(s) | Length |
|---|---|---|---|
| 1. | "Ninna Preeti Sala Kode" |
| 2. | "Eno Onthara Kushi" | Deepak Doddera, Lakshmi | 3:43 |
| 3. | "Yen Antha" | | 2:14 |
| 4. | "Edeya Gaali" |
