= Raaghu =

2023 Kannada-language film

- Directed by: M. Anand Raju
- Written by: M. Anand Raju
- Produced by: Ranvith Shivkumar; Abhishek Kota
- Starring: Vijay Raghavendra
- Cinematography: Uday Leela
- Edited by: Vijeth Chandra
- Music by: Suraj Jois
- Production company: Spandana Shrushti
- Release date: 28 April 2023
- Country: India
- Language: Kannada

Raaghu is a 2023 Indian Kannada-language crime thriller film directed by M. Anand Raju in his directorial debut. It stars Vijay Raghavendra in the lead role and the only actor appearing in the film while other supporting cast feature voice roles in the film.

Raaghu was released on 28 April 2023 and received mixed reviews from critics.

== Cast ==
- Vijay Raghavendra as Raaghu

== Reception ==
Vinay Lokesh of The Times of India gave 2. 5 out of 5 stars and wrote "Director Anand Raj deserves credit for the experiment. However, there aren’t enough sequences to create those ‘wow’ moments and the story fails to make a mark. Even the message in the climax doesn’t salvage the film". A critic from The Hindu wrote that "The film is a gutsy attempt, yet it keeps you at arm’s length throughout its 93-minute runtime due to its poor entertainment quotient". A critic from Bangalore Mirror wrote that "It is worth a watch for families ((but leave the kids at home), and those who love thrillers, especially for Vijaya Raghavendra’s fans." A critic from The South First wrote that "If you are a fan of experimental films that are high in performance, Raaghu will certainly not leave you disappointed. Moreover, it comes with suspense for a good watch". A critic from Cinema Express wrote that "Anand Raj's attempt at a minimalist film with a solo act by Vijay Raghavendra is a commendable feat. For those tired of experiencing grandiose visuals, big action scenes, and exotic locations, this film provides a refreshing and different experience". A critic from OTTplay wrote that "The film, although painfully inept because of the inattentiveness on the writer-director's part, still has enough to hold your attention and keep you (mildly) interested till the very end".
