= Case of Kondana =

- Theatrical release poster
- Directed by: Devi Prasad Shetty
- Written by: Devi Prasad Shetty
- Screenplay by: Devi Prasad Shetty
- Produced by: Devi Prasad Shetty; Sathwik Hebbar
- Starring: Vijay Raghavendra; Bhavana Menon
- Cinematography: Vishwajith Rao
- Music by: Gagan Baderiya
- Production company: Flying Elephant Story Tellers
- Release date: 26 January 2024
- Country: India
- Language: Kannada

Case of Kondana is a 2024 Indian Kannada-language thriller film directed by Devi Prasad Shetty, starring Vijay Raghavendra and Bhavana Menon in lead roles. It marked the second collaboration between Raghavendra and Shetty after Seetharam Benoy Case No. 18 (2021). The film has cinematography by Vishwajith Rao and music by Gagan Baderiya.

The film was released on 26 January 2024, coinciding with the Republic day, to positive reviews.

== Plot ==
The story is set in the fictional suburb of Kondana, near Bengaluru in South India.

Wilson (Vijay Raghavendra) is a newly recruited police officer. Although he bribed his way into the force, he genuinely wants to serve with integrity. He still owes part of the bribe to his contact, and is about to pay it off. Lakshmi (Bhavana Menon), the ACP of Wilson's station and his superior, is currently leading an investigation into a series of gruesome killings that have made national headlines. The brutal nature of the murders has deeply affected her, especially one case that left a young girl orphaned.

Raju (Saajan Kataria), a poor North Indian street food vendor living in Kondana, is struggling. His son suffers from a life-threatening illness, and the treatment costs Rs. 500,000, which he doesn't have. He tries desperately to borrow from others.

Eventually, the police identify the killer: a gangster named Selvan. During the raid, Selvan is ready to surrender, but Lakshmi shoots him dead. When Selvan's brother learns of this, he vows to avenge his brother's death by killing Lakshmi.

Meanwhile, Raju still can't find the money for his son's treatment. One night, while he's working at his food stall, his son's condition worsens. He tells his wife to bring the boy to him so they can take him to the hospital together.

At that moment, Wilson, who had just gotten the bribe money, gets into a minor accident near Raju's stall. He regains consciousness with minor injuries, steps out of his car, and sits at Raju's stall to tend to his wounds. Raju helps him. While fetching a bandage from Wilson's car, Raju notices the large sum of cash inside. Seeing no other way to save his son, he steals the money. Wilson quickly realises what happened and confronts Raju. Even when caught, Raju refuses to return the money. A struggle breaks out between them, and Wilson accidentally kills Raju.

Just then, a police patrol car approaches. In a panic, Wilson hides Raju's body and tries to appear normal. Officers Tyagaraj (Lakshmi's father) and his partner step out to investigate. Since Wilson is new to the station, they don't recognise him. Finding nothing suspicious, they leave. Wilson also drives off. However, Tyagaraj then senses something was off and decides to return. Meanwhile, Wilson heads back to retrieve Raju's body. Tyagaraj arrives in time to see Wilson dragging the body away and starts following him.

On the way, Wilson's colleague Subhash spots him and asks for a lift, which Wilson reluctantly agrees to. After getting dropped off, Subhash notices blood dripping from the car. He also recalls Wilson being anxious and a large can of petrol in the backseat. Growing suspicious, he follows Wilson.

Wilson reaches a remote field, unaware he's been followed by both Tyagaraj and Subhash. As Wilson prepares to burn Raju's body, Subhash intervenes. Wilson confesses everything, and Subhash agrees to keep it a secret. At that moment, Tyagaraj and his partner reveal themselves and confront both men. Although Wilson and Subhash try to explain, the two insist on reporting it formally.

A physical altercation breaks out. During the scuffle, Wilson's petrol can is knocked over. As tensions escalate, guns are drawn. A gunshot ignites the spilled petrol, causing a fire that kills Subhash, Tyagaraj, and his partner. Wilson, having been farther from the flames, flees the scene.

Back at the hospital, Raju's wife arrives alone with their son, as she couldn't find Raju at the stall, only to lose him to the illness due to delayed treatment.

Police quickly learn of the deaths of the three police officers and Raju. Enraged, Lakshmi swears to kill the perpetrator in the same spot, the same way they died. She launches a full-scale manhunt, assigning all officers to the investigation, including Wilson. Wilson uses the opportunity to cover his tracks: erasing CCTV footage, destroying evidence, and tampering with Raju's autopsy report to prevent identification.

Eventually, the police locate Raju's wife. During questioning, they realise her account contradicts the autopsy report. Lakshmi grows suspicious of Wilson, who submitted the report. She checks his phone's location history and sees he was at the scene of her father's murder. Along with other clues, she confirms Wilson is the perpetrator.

Meanwhile, guilt consumes Wilson after learning Raju's son died. After emotional conversations with his father and girlfriend, he decides to surrender.

Lakshmi orders her officers to bring Wilson to the field where the three policemen died. Despite Wilson's pleas, he's beaten without mercy. Just as Lakshmi is about to execute him, Selvan's brother and his gang attack. A fierce fight breaks out, leaving many dead. Lakshmi is wounded, and Selvan's brother moves to kill her. Injured but determined, Wilson rises and fights off the gang, killing the remaining members and saving Lakshmi.

The movie ends with Wilson going to jail.

== Cast ==
- Vijay Raghavendra as ASI Wilson
- Bhavana Menon as ACP Lakshmi
- Kushee Ravi as Dr. Sahana
- Rangayana Raghu as ASI Tyagaraj
- Sundar Raj as George, ASI Wilson's Father
- Petrol Prasanna as ASI Subhash
- Bala Rajwadi as Inspector Mahendar
- Saajan Kataria as Raju
- Sathwik Hebbar

== Production ==
Devi Prasad Shetty, who directed Vijay Raghavendra's 50th film, Seetharam Benoy Case No. 18 (2021), collaborated again with him for this film. It was reported that the film's story would take place over one night and is set in a fictional locality called Kondana in Bengaluru. When the film was announced, similar to Seetharam Benoy Case No. 18, the film was reported to be a crime thriller, and went with the tagline '09/2018' alluding to the film's timeline. Shetty and Sathwik Hebbar produced the film under the banner Flying Elephant Story Tellers. Kushee Ravi was cast opposite Raghavendra as the female lead. Jogi, a journalist, wrote the film's dialogue. It was reported that Poornachandra Tejaswi was first signed to score music for the film, Vishwajith Rao as cinematographer and Bhavani Shankar as art director. The film was launched in September 2022. The muhurat shot took place on 8 September in Bengaluru. The makers announced that filming would begin on 28 September.

It was reported that Raghavendra would reprise his role as a police officer, alongside Bhavana Menon, and that Kushee would play a doctor. However, Raghavendra stated that it would be a standalone film and had no link to Seetharam Benoy Case No. 18. He added that his character in the film, Wilson, was "honest and intense" and that he "is more impulsive than Seetharam". He noted that Wilson is also "brave, intelligent" and that his "aim is to nab criminals and restore peace in a place called Kondana." He stated that he drew inspiration from the cop roles portrayed by Devaraj and Shankar Nag in the past, and also his father-in-law, a former police officer. Rangayana Raghu was also cast for a prominent role.

Gagan Baderiya later replaced Tejaswi as the composer for the film. Speaking about the plot of the film, director Shetty stated that "eighty percent of the film is set during one night at a fictional place named Kondana in Bengaluru" and that "the events of that night, taking place in this mythical setting, promise answers to many questions." He added that the film had a hyperlink narrative, and expanded on the plot saying that it comprised "four layers to the story". He added, "Vijay Raghavendra as the cop, Bhavana Menon as Assistant Commissioner of Police and Kushee Ravi as a doctor at a government hospital fuel the storyline."

== Soundtrack ==
Case of Kondana

Soundtrack album by Gagan Baderiya
- Released: 2024
- Recorded: 2023
- Genre: Feature film soundtrack
- Length: 4:55
- Label: Anand Audio

Gagan Baderiya, who previously scored for Seetharam Benoy Case No. 18 (2021), composed the film's background and scored for its soundtrack.

Track listing
No.	Title	Lyrics	Artist(s)	Length
1.	"Neene Neene Ee Yedeyalli"	Pramod Marvante	Ashok shetty, Madhuri Sheshadri	1:35
2.	"Naa Geechida"	Vishwajith Rao	Venkatesh D C	3:20

== Release ==
=== Theatrical ===
The film was released on 26 February 2024 in limited screens across Karnataka. The film had a slow start at the box office and had a decent run but could not make a mark.

=== Home media ===
The film made its digital debut on 28 March 2024 on Amazon Prime Video in Kannada and Malayalam languages.

== Reception ==
The film opened to positive reviews with praise towards direction, music, and cinematography. A critic from The Times of India rated the film 3 1/2 and wrote that "Case of Kondana is a finely crafted suspense thriller, executed to near perfection. The movie sure has its flaws, but this multi-dimensional story with interesting intercuts sure evokes intrigue".

A critic from Bangalore Mirror rated the film three out of five stars and wrote that "All in all, it is worth a watch for all audiences".

A critic from The New Indian Express wrote that "Devi Prasad Shetty excels in creating a gripping atmosphere, seamlessly intertwining multiple storylines within the plot contributing to the complexity of the case; Despite a few predictable moments, the overall strength of the film shines through in its robust performances".

A critic from Times Now wrote that "Devi Prasad Shetty's direction is commendable, creating a visually engaging experience with crisp cinematography that captures the essence of Kondana".

A critic from Deccan Herald wrote that "Case of Kondana is intense and realistic and handles a thriller with aplomb. Watch it for a fresh experience".

A critic from The Hindu wrote that "Case of Kondana may not become a classic, but you don’t mind as the pluses outweigh the minuses".
