= Toss (2017 film) =

2012 film by Dayal Padmanabhan

- Directed by: Dayal Padmanabhan
- Written by: Dayal Padmanabhan
- Produced by: Dayal Padmanabhan; Avinash U Shetty
- Starring: Vijay Raghavendra; Sandeep; Ramya Barna
- Cinematography: Rakesh B
- Edited by: Sri (Crazy Mindz)
- Music by: Gowtham Shrivatsa
- Production companies: D Pictures; Om Production House
- Release date: 21 July 2017
- Running time: 2hr 26min
- Country: India
- Language: Kannada

Toss is a 2017 Indian Kannada romantic comedy film written, directed and co-produced by Dayal Padmanabhan. The film stars Vijay Raghavendra, Sandeep and Ramya Barna in the lead roles. The film, under the banner of D Pictures and Om productions, was launched by Puneeth Rajkumar on 27 January 2012. After being in development for more than 5 years, the film is set to release on 21 July 2017.

== Cast ==
- Vijay Raghavendra as Madhav
- Sandeep as Sandeep
- Ramya Barna
- Sihi Kahi Chandru
- Sihi Kahi Geetha
- Raju Thalikote
- Suchendra Prasad

== Soundtrack ==
Soundtrack was composed by Gautham Srivatsa.

- "Yavude Sammandha" - Vijay Raghavendra
- "Nidde Madi" - Devan Ekambaram, Charan Raj
- "What Are You Doing" - Gurukiran, Chaithra HG
- "Rottiyu Jaari" - Chaithra HG

== Reception ==
The Times of India wrote that "The film has its share of drawbacks, such as some crass gay references for instance. But it surely is worth that trip to the cinema hall if you are in the mood for something hatke". Chitraloka wrote "There are some good peppy dialogues and lyrics in the film which keeps the story teeming with life. There is a tight script which helps the plot moving forward and surprise elements that keep popping up one after the other".

== Sources ==
- http://www.chitraloka.com/2012/01/25/dayals-ondu-roopayalli-eradu-preethi/
- http://movies.sulekha.com/kannada/ondu-roopayalli-eradu-preethi/default.htm
- Oneindia
- http://wesandalwood.drupalgardens.com/aggregator/categories/1
