= Shravana (film) =

Indian Kannada-language romantic drama film

- Directed by: B. S. Rajashekar
- Screenplay by: B. S. Rajashekar
- Story by: Seethapathi
- Dialogues by: Ravikishore; B. S. Rajashekar; Manju Hasan
- Produced by: R. Mallikarjunayya
- Starring: Vijay Raghavendra; Bhuvana Chandra; Sandeep; Gayathiri Iyer
- Cinematography: K. Vasudev
- Edited by: K. Girish Kumar
- Music by: Karthik Bhoopathi
- Production company: Chithra Madhyama
- Release date: 11 March 2011
- Country: India
- Language: Kannada

Shravana (transl. Shravana) is a 2011 Kannada-language romantic drama film directed by B. S. Rajashekar. The film stars Vijay Raghavendra, Bhuvana Chandra, Sandeep and Gayathiri Iyer. The film was released to negative reviews.

== Cast ==
- Vijay Raghavendra as Vijay "Viji"
- Bhuvana Chandra
- Sandeep
- Gayathiri Iyer as Kala
- Bank Janardhan
- M. S. Umesh
- Michael Madhu
- Sathyajith
- Ninasam Ashwath

== Production ==
The film is about three friends who are aimless in life and follows the theme that behind every successful man is a woman. The film was predominately shot in Tumkuru apart from one song which was shot in Bengaluru.

== Soundtrack ==
The film has soundtrack composed by Karthik Bhoopathi.

Track listing
No.	Title	Lyrics	Singer(s)	Length
1.	"Bhoom Shaka Laka"	B. S. Rajashekar	Tippu	4:34
2.	"Namoora Devara Jaathre"	Doddarangegowda	Gana Ulaganathan, Chaitra H. G., L. N. Shastri	4:50
3.	"Kanasugala Koteyali"	B. S. Rajashekar	Vyshali Sisters, K. S. Chithra	4:24
4.	"Pathithe Ennidiro O Athithi"	Honnenahalli Manjunath	Chaitra H. G.	6:17
Total length:				20:05

== Release and reception ==
The film was scheduled to release in Shravana (mid-July to mid-August) of 2010 but was delayed.

A critic from the IANS wrote, "Shravana is a big let down and fiercely boring. Better watch Kempe Gowda again". A critic from Prajavani wrote that "Shravana is like a weakly shelled pill of moral teaching and is very difficult to swallow."
