= Malgudi Days (2020 film) =

Indian Kannada Film

- Film poster
- Directed by: Kishor Moodbidri
- Written by: Kishor Moodbidri
- Produced by: K Rathnakar Kamath
- Starring: Vijay Raghavendra Greeshma Shridar Arjun Kapikad
- Cinematography: Uday Leela
- Edited by: Pradeep Nayak
- Music by: Gagan Baderiya
- Production companies: Swayam Prabha Entertainment & Productions
- Release date: 7 February 2020
- Running time: 154 minutes
- Country: India
- Language: Kannada

Malgudi Days is a 2020 Indian Kannada-language drama film written and directed by Kishore Moodbidri, and produced by K Rathnakar Kamath. Starring Vijay Raghavendra, Greeshma Shridar, with a music score by Gagan Baderiya, it was released in India on 7 February 2020. Despite receiving critical reviews for music, Gagan went on to win the Karnataka State Film Award for Best Music Director for the year 2020.

== Plot ==
Writer Lakshmi Narayana Malgudi, (Vijay Raghavendra) a well-known writer, has announced his retirement from writing and his fans are heartbroken. The man, who lived his entire life creating wonderful memories for his readers, carries around a heavy heart but refuses to share with anyone the reason behind it. While his family suggests that he settle in a foreign land, Malgudi has other plans. He decides to go back to the place where he spent his childhood - Malgudi. Prakruti (Greeshma), who has quit her job after reporting workplace harassment, is on the way to find herself. The two meet into each other and begin a journey together. En route, they narrate their stories to each other. In the flashback (the late 70s), Malgudi (a Hindu boy), a studious student of Class 10, falls in love with Lenita (a Christian girl) who is mute. Her father, a cop, is recently transferred to Malgudi and the family is still in the process of settling down. Malgudi's love for Lenita doubles when he finds out she is mute. Amidst all this, communal tension breaks out between Hindus and Christians in the town. While Lenita reciprocates Malgudi's love, miscreants blame Lenita's family for indulging in conversion. As the tension intensifies, Malgudi flees to Bengaluru. Forty years later, still in love with Lenita, he enters Malgudi with the hope of meeting her.

== Cast ==
- Vijay Raghavendra as Lakshmi Narayana Malgudi in short Malgudi
- Greeshma Sridhar as Prakruti
- Arjun Kapikad as Vijay
- Dhanaraj Cm
- Tejaswini

== Production ==
The film, despite its title, is not based on the short story collection by R. K. Narayan.

== Soundtrack ==
Malgudi Days

Soundtrack album by Gagan Baderiya
- Released: 2020
- Recorded: 2019
- Genre: Feature film soundtrack
- Label: PRK Audio
External audio
- Official Audio Jukebox on YouTube

Greeshma Shridar composed the music There are eight songs.

Track list
No.	Title	Lyrics	Singer(s)	Length
1.	"Katale Sarge"	Kishor Moodbidri	Raghu Dixit	1:09
2.	"Hoo Malege"	Kishor Moodbidri	Siddhartha Belmannu, Sruthy Sasidharan	4:15
3.	"Oorondu Karedante"	Kishor Moodbidri	Raghu Dixit, Vaishnavi Ravi	4:01
4.	"Kanasina Kannye Kannamunde"	Kishor Moodbidri, Gubbi	Sanjith Hegde, Ninaada Nayak, Gubbi	3:10
5.	"Nooru Nooru Aase" (Rap:Madhura Gowda)	Pramod Maravante	Supriya Lohith	4:15
6.	"Nenapina Doniyali"	Madhuri Seshadri	Madhuri Seshadri	2:39
7.	"Kanneeru Kenney Mele"	Kishor Moodbidri	Sanjith Hegde	4:01
8.	"Amma-Bharavaseya Belaka Bitti"	Kishor Moodbidri	Ashwini Sharma	3:19
Total length:				25:24

== Home media ==
The film was made available to stream on OTT platform Amazon Prime on 8 March 2020.

== Reception ==
Reviewing Malgudi Days for The Times of India Tanvi PS gave three points five stars from five. Aravind Shwetha of The News Minute wrote, "Editor Pradeep Nayak had scope for enhancing the quality of the final output by chopping off a few unnecessary scenes. He seems to have gotten along with the ride and let the slow pace try to impress the audience. The biggest drawback of the movie is the music by Gagan Baderia".
