= Aparna (television presenter) =

Indian anchor and actress (1966–2024)

- Born: 17 October 1965; Chikmagalur, Mysore State, India
- Died: 11 July 2024 (aged 57); Banashankari, Bangalore, Karnataka, India
- Occupations: Television presenter; actress; radio jockey
- Years active: 1984–2024
- Known for: The voice behind Namma Metro-Bangalore, KSRTC announcement

Aparna Vastarey (17 October 1965 – 11 July 2024) was an Indian actress, television presenter, and radio jockey. A popular face in Kannada television, she was known for her work as a presenter of various shows that aired on DD Chandana in the 1990s. She made her cinematic debut in 1984 with Puttanna Kanagal's last film, Masanada Hoovu. Between 2015 and 2021, she played Varalakshmi on the sketch comedy show, Majaa Talkies.

== Biography ==
Aparna was born on 17 October 1965 in the Chikmagalur district of the erstwhile Mysore State (now Karnataka, India). She made her feature film debut in Puttanna Kanagal's 1984 film, Masanada Hoovu, starring alongside stalwarts Ambareesh and Jayanthi. She began working as a radio jockey (RJ) with All India Radio in 1993, and went on to work with AIR FM Rainbow as its first presenter. Her career in Kannada television as a presenter began in 1990 with DD Chandana; she was part of a majority of its productions until 2000. As part of Deepawali celebrations in 1998, she presented shows for a record eight hours.

Aparna worked as an actress in television shows such as Moodala Mane and Mukta. In 2013, she appeared as a contestant in the first season of the Kannada reality television show Bigg Boss, which aired on ETV Kannada. Since 2015, she appeared in the sketch comedy television show, Majaa Talkies, as Varalakshmi, the vain and boastful sister-in-law of the character of Srujan Lokesh who claimed to be friends of popular personalities such as Barack Obama and Salman Khan.

In 2011, Aparna lent her voice to the recorded announcements of passenger boarding and disemabrking the Bengaluru Metro. In 2024, after more than 20 years away from acting, she returned with Gangadhar Salimath's cybercrime film Grey Games, in which she played the mother of a boy addicted to online gaming. Of the gap, she stated, "It is not that I did not want to work; I did receive offers. But the role's significance mattered to me. Often, I was not fully briefed on what exactly I was supposed to do. I prioritised the importance of my role rather than its duration. Many times, the roles I was offered did not satisfy me, so I was not eager to accept them." A review in the Deccan Herald stated that she took on "a powerful role and is absolutely convincing."

== Death ==
On 11 July 2024, Aparna died at the age of 57 due to complications from lung cancer.

== Filmography ==
=== Films ===
Year	Title	Role	Notes	Ref.
1984	Masanada Hoovu	Parvati		
1987	Sangrama			
1988	Mathru Vathsalya	Rohini		
1989	Ondagi Balu			
1989	Nammoora Raja			
1989	Inspector Vikram	Vijaya		
2024	Grey Games	Tara		
2026	Graamaayana		Posthumous release	

=== Television ===
Year	Title	Role	Notes	Ref.
2003–2004	Moodala Mane	Sukanya		
2005	Ee Family	Host		
2008	Sahagamana			
2008–2010	Mukta			
2010	Shubhamangala			
2013	Bigg Boss Kannada 1	Herself		
2015–2017	Majaa Talkies	Varalakshmi		
2018–2021	Majaa Talkies Super Season	Varalakshmi		
2019–2020	Ivalu Sujatha	Durga		
2021	Nannarasi Radhe	Janaki	Cameo appearance	
