= Kalla Malla Sulla =

2011 Indian film directed by Udhaya Prakash

- Directed by: Udaya Prakash
- Screenplay by: Uday prakash
- Story by: Sakthi Chidambaram
- Based on: Charlie Chaplin (Tamil)
- Produced by: K. Manju
- Starring: V. Ravichandran; Ramesh Aravind; Ragini Dwivedi; Vijay Raghavendra
- Cinematography: G. S. V. Seetharam
- Edited by: K. M. Prakash
- Music by: Alex Paul
- Production company: K Manju Cinemas
- Distributed by: Jayanna Films
- Release date: 16 September 2011
- Running time: 160 minutes
- Country: India
- Language: Kannada

Kalla Malla Sulla is a 2011 Indian Kannada-language film in the comedy genre starring V. Ravichandran, Ramesh Aravind, Vijay Raghavendra in the lead roles. The film has been directed and written by Udhaya Prakash and produced by K. Manju. Alex Paul has composed the music. This is a remake of the 2002 Tamil film Charlie Chaplin.

== Cast ==
- V. Ravichandran as Ravi
- Ramesh Aravind as Ramesh
- Vijay Raghavendra as Raghu
- Ragini Dwivedi as Khushbu
- Yagna Shetty as Ramya
- Rishika Singh as Sanjana
- Rangayana Raghu
- Monica
- Mandya Ramesh
- Sihi Kahi Chandru
- Sadhu Kokila

== Soundtrack ==
No.	Title	Lyrics	Singer(s)	Length
1.	"Ee Duniyadalli"	Kaviraj	Vijay Prakash
2.	"Thuppa Beka Thuppa"	Kaviraj	Jassie Gift, Sunitha
3.	"Nodabeda Avanananne"	Kaviraj	Anitha
4.	"Joke Naanu Balliya Minchu (remix)"		Chaitra HG
5.	"Elliruve Kushboo"	Kaviraj	Shankar Mahadevan
6.	"Rocku Chikku"	Kaviraj	Ajay Warrier, Chaitra HG

== Reception ==
=== Critical response ===
A critic from The New Indian Express wrote "Among the heroes, it is Ramesh Aravind who steals the show with his sterling performance. His gestures when he lands at the wrong place at an equally wrong time and attempts to come out of such situations are hilarious. Vijaya Rahavendra has also acted well". B S Srivani from Deccan Herald wrote "Alex Paul catches the ears with three songs while GSV Seetharam’s camera captures both the locations and Ragini’s figure in all their glory. Kalla Malla Sulla is pure timepass". A critic from The Times of India scored the film at 3.5 out of 5 stars and says "Ramesh steals the show with his brilliant performance. Ravichandran and Vijaya Raghavendra excel. Ragini wins your heart with her beauty and expressions. Rishika Singh impresses. Monica and Yagna Shetty have done justice to their roles. Music by Alex Paul and cinematography by G S V Seetharam are good". Sunayana Suresh from DNA wrote "This film is worth a one-time watch with the family. Just ensure you close your kids’ eyes during two songs. You’ll know which ones they are". A critic from Bangalore Mirror wrote "Also at the end, it is shown that the ‘wronged wives’ have learnt a lesson or two. Too much of male chauvinism? We think so.After a drab first half, the film picks up pace later on. Then there is non-stop laugh-a-minute sequences till the end".
