= Suvadugal =

2013 Indian film by Jayabala

- Directed by: Jayabala
- Written by: Jayabala
- Produced by: Jayabala
- Starring: Jayabala; Monica
- Cinematography: Jayabala
- Edited by: Jayabala
- Music by: M. S. Viswanathan
- Production company: Paana Productions
- Release date: 30 August 2013
- Country: India
- Language: Tamil

Suvadugal (transl. Clues) is a 2013 Indian Tamil-language drama film written, directed and produced by Jayabala. The film also features him in the lead role, alongside Monica and K. R. Vijaya. After beginning production in 2003, the film was released on 30 August 2013.

== Cast ==
- Jayabala as Kannan
- Monica
- K. R. Vijaya
- Saranya
- Rajesh as the rival landlord
- Mohan Sharma
- Shanthi Ganesh
- K. R. Vatsala
- Omakuchi Narasimhan

== Production ==
New York-based aeronautical engineer, Jayabala — a native of Sri Lanka — announced plans to direct, produce and act in Suvadugal during 2003. He undertook courses in film direction and cinematography at New York University, and wanted to make a film along the lines of Edhir Neechal (1968). Monica was cast in the lead female role, while actors such as K. R. Vijaya, Saranya, Rajesh, Mohan Sharma, Shanthi Ganesh and K. R. Vatsala also joined the cast. Jaibala's wife, a doctor, handled the production, while Hollywood technicians were signed to help work on live sound.

Actresses K. R. Vijaya and Monica had a narrow escape from an injury when shooting for the film in Courtallam. The crane used to mount a camera suddenly titled and was about to fall on the actresses. However, about 200 people who had come to see the shooting of the film helped stop the crane and saved the crew and cast from an accident.

Ten years after production was complete, Jaibala prepared the film for a theatrical release. The delayed release of the film meant that the film was M. S. Viswanathan's final release as a music composer.

== Release and reception ==
The film had a delayed theatrical release on 30 August 2013 alongside Thanga Meenkal, Ponmaalai Pozhudhu and Summa Nachunu Irukku. A reviewer of the film from entertainment portal Sulekha wrote "at a time when mindless masalas rule the roost, films like Suvadugal comes a whiff of fresh air". The reviewer added "combining three hats together of action, direction and production is no easy task. Jaibala has managed to combine the three tasks well indeed in Suvadugal which has everything including action, romance and a powerful message". A critic from The Times of India wrote "there is literally no story to speak of in the first half, the second half is only marginally better". The critic added "It is so ineptly directed, shoddily shot and badly acted that it sets a new pinnacle for truly dreadful filmmaking."

The following year, Jaibala announced a different project, which eventually did not materialise.
