= Tilak Shekar =

Indian actor (born 1982)

Tillak Shekar
- Occupations: Actor; model
- Notable work: Ugramm

Tillak Shekar (born March 1982), mononymously known as Tillak, is an Indian actor who appears mainly in Kannada-language films. He is a model-turned-actor and is known for his negative roles in Kannada movies. He was one of the 13 housemates in the first season of Bigg Boss Kannada aired in April 2013. Thilak is appreciated for his act in the movie Ugramm. He played the lead role in the horror thriller Karvva (2016).

== Filmography ==
=== Films ===
Year	Title	Role	Notes
2006	Ganda Hendathi	Sachin	
2007	Meera Madhava Raghava	Raghava	
2008	Accident	Tilak	
2009	Huchchi	Tilak	
2009	Hatrick Hodi Maga		
2009	Kencha		
2011	Dandam Dashagunam	Srikanth	
2011	Khadimaru	Tilak	
2011	Chinnada Thaali	Vinod	
2013	Ziddi		
2013	Story Kathe	Rajeev	
2013	Sri Adi Parashakti		
2014	Ninnindale	Sachin	
2014	Amanusha		
2014	Ugramm	Bala	Nominated, Filmfare Award for Best Supporting Actor – Kannada
2014	Power		
2015	Octopus		
2015	Tripura	Tilak	Telugu film
2016	Whatsapp Love		
2016	Karvva	Tilak	Nominated, SIIMA Award for Best Actor In A Supporting Role - Kannada Nominated - IIFA Utsavam Award for Best Actor in a Supporting Role - Kannada
2016	Nanna Ninna Prema Kathe		
2016	Just Aakasmika	Sachin	
2016	Santhu Straight Forward	Imraan	
2016	Mandya to Mumbai		
2017	Sarvasva	Guru	
2017	Idam Porul Aavi		
2017	Anveshi		
2018	Iruvudellava Bittu	Dev	
2018	Villain	Alex	
2021	Rathnan Prapancha	Mayuri's Boyfriend	Cameo appearance
2022	James	Jagan	
2022	Kaaneyaadavara Bagge Prakatane	Yashwanth	
2024	Jog 101	Amar	
2025	Amruthamathi	Ashtavankara	
2025	Usiru		
2025	Karvva 3 †		Filming
2025	H/34 - Pallavi Talkies †		Post production

=== Television ===
Year	Title	Role	Notes
2013	Bigg Boss Kannada 1	Contestant	
