= Namyajamanru =

- VCD Cover
- Directed by: T. S. Nagabharana
- Written by: T. S. Nagabharana
- Produced by: Rajakumari Rajshekar
- Starring: Vishnuvardhan; Lakshmi Gopalaswamy; Navya Nair; Vijay Raghavendra
- Cinematography: Ramesh Babu
- Edited by: G. Basavaraj Urs
- Music by: Hamsalekha
- Production company: R. R. Creations
- Release date: 27 February 2009
- Running time: 140 minutes
- Country: India
- Language: Kannada

Namyajamanru is a 2009 Indian Kannada-language action drama film directed and written by T. S. Nagabharana. The film stars Vishnuvardhan along with Navya Nair and Vijay Raghavendra. The film was produced by Rajakumari Rajshekar. The film was released on 27 February 2009.

== Cast ==
- Vishnuvardhan as Shashank
- Navya Nair as Charulatha
- Vijay Raghavendra as Alok
- Lakshmi Gopalaswamy as Urmila (Guest Appearance)
- Ananth Nag as Retired Colonel Hoovayya
- Sarath Babu as Dr. Patil
- Ramesh Bhat as Niranjan (Guest Appearance)
- Mandya Ramesh as DK Boss
- Chitra Shenoy as Pranjali Niranjan (Guest Appearance)
- Hemanth G Nag as Dinesh
- Rohith Nagesh
- Umesh

== Soundtrack ==
The music of the film was composed and lyrics written by Hamsalekha.

Namyajamanru

Soundtrack album by Hamsalekha
- Released: 2009
- Genre: Feature film soundtrack
- Label: Akshaya Audio

No.	Title	Singer(s)	Length
1.	"Dundu Bhoomige"	S. P. Balasubrahmanyam, K. S. Chitra
2.	"Yenayithe"	Hemanth Kumar
3.	"Ee Hrudaya"	Vijay Raghavendra, Nanditha
4.	"Gombe Mari"	S. P. Balasubrahmanyam
5.	"Ninne Rathri"	S. P. Balasubrahmanyam, Badri Prasad
6.	"Vadhu Varare"	S. P. Balasubrahmanyam, Anuradha Bhat, Hemanth Kumar, Badri Prasad
7.	"Ee Mouna"	Anuradha Bhat, K. S. Chitra, Badri Prasad

== Reception ==
=== Critical response ===
R G Vijayasarathy of Rediff.com scored the film at 3 out of 5 stars and says "Vishnuvardhan's performance is one of the highlights of the film. He has played a character that suits his age and stature. He is brilliant throughout particularly in the climax sequence. Navya Nair is exceptional as the vulnerable yet unpredictable Charu who becomes Urmila because of the disorder. Vijaya Raghavendra has done a good job as Alok. He also renders good play back for the E Hrudaya song. Lakshmi Gopalaswamy shines in the small role, while Anant Nag, Ramesh Bhat fill in their respective roles". A critic from The Times of India scored the film at 3 out of 5 stars and wrote "While it's a pleasing performance by Vishnuvardhan, Navya Nair is at her best and Lakshmi Gopalaswamy, Anant Nag, Vijay Raghavendra excel. Music by Hamsalekha is melodious. Ramesh Babu's camerawork is good". A critic from Sify.com wrote "Two lovely tunes and lyrics have come from national repute music director Hamsalekha. The cinematography by Ramesh Babu is captured very efficiently. This is worth watching for variety and curiosity elements in it."
