= Ganesha Matthe Banda =

Ganesha I Love You
- Directed by: Phani Ramachandra
- Written by: Vishnuvardhan
- Produced by: Jayamma ChinneGowda
- Starring: Vijay Raghavendra; Neethu; Pragna
- Cinematography: R Manjunath
- Edited by: Basavaraj Urs (Shivu), B S Kemparaj
- Music by: V. Manohar
- Release date: 2008
- Country: India
- Language: Kannada

Ganesha Matthe Banda (transl. Ganesha came again) is a 2008 Kannada film directed by Phani Ramachandra and starring Vijay Raghavendra, Neethu and newcomer Pragna. JM Prahlad wrote the story, which uses Phani Ramachandra's favorite screen-title Ganesha. The movie was an attempt to reinvigorate the popular Ganesha series.

== Cast ==
- Vijay Raghavendra as Ganesha
- Neethu as Gayathri
- Pragna as Savithri
- Ananth Nag as Padmanabacharya
- Vinaya Prasad as Bhageerathi
- Vishal Hegde as Shankar
- Preethi Srinivas
- Ramesh Bhat
- Doddanna

== Production ==
The film began production under the title Matthe Bandha Ganesha.

== Soundtrack ==
The soundtrack was composed by V. Manohar.

No.	Title	Lyrics	Singer(s)	Length
1.	"Bangalore Nande"	Kaviraj	Rajesh Krishnan	4:55
2.	"Baro Gelaya"		Hemanth Kumar, Sunitha S. Murali	4:32
3.	"Chamarajpete"	H.S.Pani Ramchandra	V. Manohar	2:51
4.	"Gopika"	V. Manohar	Vijay Raghavendra, V. Manohar	4:44
5.	"Michael Jackson"	Kaviraj	Hemanth Kumar, Sunitha S. Murali	5:00
6.	"Premavivaha"	Jayanth Kaikini	Nanditha	4:32

== Reception ==
A critic from Rediff.com wrote that "Ganesha Maththe Bandha is an entertainer like many of Phani's films of the Ganesha series. Go and watch it". A critic from Bangalore Mirror wrote that " The film is not hero-centric and reminds you that it is the story and screenplay that have made this a good film. No excuses for missing this film".
