= Vijay Raghavendra =

Indian Kannada actor

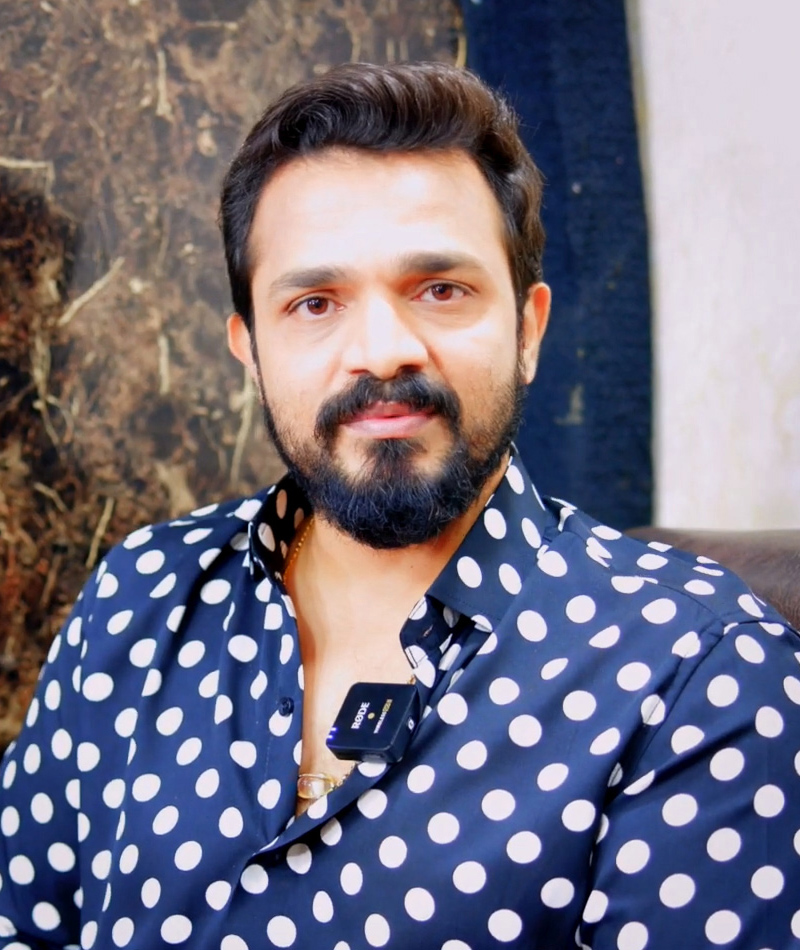
- Vijay Raghavendra in 2023
- Born: Mysuru, Karnataka, India
- Occupations: Actor; film director; Television presenter
- Years active: 1982–present
- Spouse: Spandana (m. 2007; died 2023)
- Children: 1
- Father: S. A. Chinne Gowda
- Relatives: Sriimurali (brother); See Rajkumar family

Saligrama Chinnegowda Vijaya Raghavendra, known professionally as Vijay Raghavendra, is an Indian actor who appears predominantly in Kannada films. Referred to popularly as "Chinnari Mutha", Vijay is the son of producer S. A. Chinne Gowda and nephew of actor Dr. Rajkumar.

Vijay started his career as a child artist through the film Chalisuva Modagalu (1982) and won critical acclaims for his performances in Chinnari Mutha (1993) and Kotreshi Kanasu (1994). The latter film won him the National Film Award for Best Child Artist. His first lead role was in Ramoji Rao's production titled Ninagagi in 2002, which was a commercial success and one of the highest-grossing films of the year. However, his subsequent projects under-performed at the box office until he was noticed for his role in the T. S. Nagabharana's period drama Kallarali Hoovagi in 2006, followed by his home production film Sevanthi Sevanthi in the same year. For playing the role of Puttaraj Gawai in the biographical film Shivayogi Sri Puttayyajja in 2016, Vijay won the Karnataka State Film Award for Best Actor. In 2018, he made his directorial debut in Kismath (2018).

In 2013, by public vote, Vijay won the first season of the game show Bigg Boss Kannada – one of the Indian versions of Celebrity Big Brother, currently produced by Endemol India.

== Early life ==
Vijay Raghavendra was born in Bangalore, India to a family of film personalities. He began to act in films featuring his uncle Rajkumar in the lead. After having acted in about eight films as a child artist, Vijay underwent a formal training in acting at Chennai.

== Film career ==
=== Child roles : 1980s–1990s ===
In 1982, Vijay appeared in a small role as a child in Singeetham Srinivasa Rao's romantic drama Chalisuva Modagalu, starring his uncle Rajkumar, Ambika and his cousin Puneeth Rajkumar, credited as Master Lohith. He went on to appear in the 1989 movie Parashuram, alongside his cousin Puneeth Rajkumar in a song. After a brief gap, in 1991 he appeared in Aralida Hoovugalu, a remake of the Hindi film Jawani Diwani (1971), directed by Chi. Dattaraj and co-starred Shiva Rajkumar. His next movie Chinnari Mutha became a huge success and he became a household name in Karnataka. After that, he acted in many movies, including Kotreshi Kanasu, for which he won a National Award for his performance.

In 1993, Vijay, in his teens, appeared in three films: H. R. Bhargava's novel-based drama Jaga Mechida Huduga, Renuka Sharma's devotional Kollura Sri Mookambika, where he played the role of young Shankaracharya and the lead protagonist in the T. S. Nagabharana's Children's film Chinnari Mutha. The film won multiple laurels and awards upon release both at the state and national level. Vijay won the Karnataka State Film Award for Best Child Actor (Male) for his portrayal of an innocent Mutha who rises to great popularity through his good deeds. His popularity further rose in 1995 with the Nagathihalli Chandrashekar's film adaption of the novel Kotra Highschoolige Seriddu, titled Kotreshi Kanasu. Vijay played the title role of Kotreshi and went on to win the National Film Award for Best Child Artist for the year 1994–95. The other film he featured in was the biographical Sangeetha Sagara Ganayogi Panchakshara Gavai, directed by Chindodi Bangaresh. He again played the title role as the young and blind reformer Gawai and also portrayed the younger part of Narendra in the Hindi film Swami Vivekananda. Following this, he took a break from films and concentrated on his studies.

=== Adult roles: 2002–present ===
His first adult role as an actor was in Ninagagi (2002), a box office blockbuster which brought him success on his first role opposite the debutant Radhika. The film was a remake of the Telugu hit Nuvve Kavali, which screened for over 100 days and created a record. Following this success, he signed two more movies in the same year, which could not succeed at the box office. He has acted in many movies since then. His notable movies are Khushi (2003), Rishi (2005), Kallarali Hoovagi (2006) and Ganesha Matte Banda (2008). Regarding his performance in Khushi, a critic noted, "Vijay is like Rahul Dravid of Indian cricket. He has churned out emotions very well".

Vijay did not have a single release in 2010. His much delayed films Shravana, Vinayaka Geleyara Balaga and the multi-starrer Kalla Malla Sulla released in 2011 with the latter two films earning favourable reviews. In 2012, he starred again in a multi-starrer comedy Snehitaru, which received a mixed response at the box office. In 2013, Vijay was a contestant and winner in the much talked about Kannada version of the reality show Bigg Boss in its first season, which started with 13 contestants. Vijay has been reportedly paid Rs. 5 million prize money. In 2016, he starred in the biographical Shivayogi Sri Puttayyajja and won the Karnataka State Film Award for Best Actor.

== Personal life ==
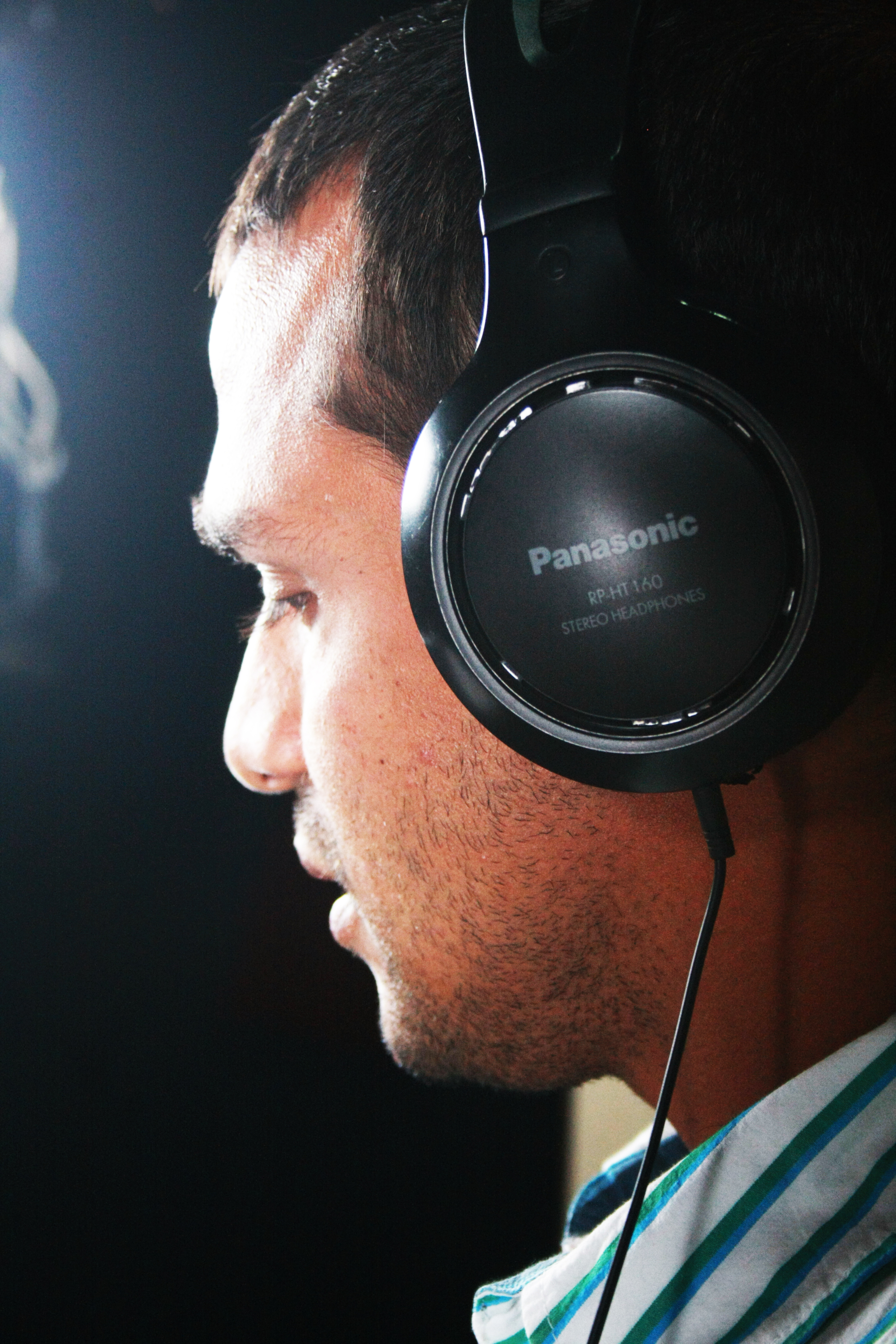
Recording session

Vijay is the eldest child of producer S. A. Chinne Gowda and his wife Jayamma. He has an elder sister and a younger brother, Sriimurali, who is a popular Kannada film actor. His paternal aunt Parvathamma Rajkumar was a prominent film producer and distributor in Kannada cinema. He is the cousin of actors Shiva Rajkumar, Raghavendra Rajkumar and Puneeth Rajkumar. On 26 August 2007, he married a Tulu-speaking girl, Spandana, the daughter of Assistant Commissioner of Police, B. K. Shivaram. The couple has a son named Shourya. Spandana died on 7 August 2023 from cardiac arrest in Bangkok.

In 2013, it was announced that he had joined other Bollywood and international celebrities in the TeachAids initiative, a state-of-the-art approach to worldwide HIV prevention, developed at Stanford University.

== Filmography ==
=== Films ===
Key
†	Denotes films that have not yet been released

Year	Title	Role	Notes	Ref.
1982	Chalisuva Modagalu	Child judge in the song "My Lord Nanna Vaada"	Credited as Master Raghavendra	
1989	Parashuram	Crowd member	Special appearance in the song "Kadre Thappu Kondre Thappu"	
1991	Aralida Hoovugalu	Vijay's nephew		
1993	Jaga Mechida Huduga	Young Shivu		
1993	Kollura Sri Mookambika	Young Shankaracharya		
1993	Chinnari Mutha	Mutta	Karnataka State Film Award for Best Child Actor (Male)	
1994	Kotreshi Kanasu	Kotreshi	National Film Award for Best Child Artist	
1995	Sangeetha Sagara Ganayogi Panchakshara Gavai	Young Ganayogi Panchakshara Gawai		
1998	Swami Vivekananda	Young Narendra	Hindi film	
2002	Ninagagi	Tarun		
2002	Prema Qaidi	Vijay		
2002	Romeo Juliet	Achyuth		
2003	Heart Beats	Vikky		
2003	Preetisle Beku	Ganesha		
2003	Vikram	Vikram		
2003	Khushi	Vijay		
2003	Vijaya Simha	Vijay		
2004	Avale Nanna Gelathi	Akash		
2005	Rishi	Hari		
2006	Shri	Shreekanth		
2006	Sevanthi Sevanthi	Devu		
2006	Kallarali Hoovagi	Jayadeva		
2007	Ee Rajeev Gandhi Alla	Rajiv		
2007	Naanu Neenu Jodi	Arjun		
2008	Beladingalagi Baa	Vivek		
2008	Minchina Ota	Kishore		
2008	Ganesha Matte Banda	Ganesha		
2008	Mast Maja Maadi	Ramu		
2009	Nam Yajamanru	Alok		
2009	Karanji	Viji		
2009	IPC Section 300	Viji		
2009	Gokula	Raja		
2010	Khiladi Krishna	Krishna		
2010	Aithalakkadi	Himself	Special appearance	
2011	Shravana	Vijay		
2011	Vinayaka Geleyara Balaga	Viju		
2011	Vighneshwara	Vijay		
2011	Kalla Malla Sulla	Raghu		
2011	Naliyona Bara	Rajeev		
2012	Snehitaru	Vittal		
2012	Golmaal	Chakravarthy		
2013	Chella Pilli	Hemanth		
2013	Bhajarangi	Himself	Special appearance	
2014	Brahmashri Narayana Guru Swamy	Devotee	Tulu film	
2014	Paramashiva	Raghu		
2014	Fair & Lovely	Abhimanyu		
2015	Vamshodharaka	Vishwa		
2016	Shivayogi Sri Puttayyajja	Puttaraj Gawai	Karnataka State Film Award for Best Actor	
2016	Ranatantra	Gautham		
2016	Apoorva	Vijay Raghavendra		
2016	Nanna Ninna Prema Kathe	Shankar		
2017	Srikanta	Tarun		
2017	Chowka	Surya Shetty		
2017	Eradu Kanasu	Muthu		
2017	Happy New Year	Raghavendra		
2017	Toss	Madhav		
2017	Mass Leader	Vijay		
2017	Jani	Jani		
2018	Kismath	Vijay	Also director	
2018	Raja Loves Radhe	Raja		
2018	Paradesi C/o London	Ram		
2019	Yada Yada Hi Dharmasya	Dharma		
2020	Malgudi Days	Laxmi Narayana Malgudi		
2021	Seetharam Benoy Case No. 18	Seetharam		
2023	Kaasina Sara	Sundaresh		
2023	Raaghu	Raaghu		
2023	Savitri	Prashant		
2023	O Manase	Karthik		
2023	Kadda Chithra	Vijay Kshatriya		
2023	Marichi	Bhairav Naik		
2024	Case of Kondana	Wilson		
2024	Jog 101	Vikram		
2024	Grey Games	Dr. Ram		
2025	Nimagondu Sihi Suddi	Dr. Vikas	Cameo appearance	
2025	FIR 6 to 6	Inspector Garuda		
2025	Swapna Mantapa	Shivakumar & Chanderaya	Dual role	
2025	Rippan Swamy	Rippan Swamy		
2026	Second Case of Seetharam	Seetharam		
2026	Shreemati Sindhura			
2026	Rudrabhishekam		Dual role	

=== Television ===
Year	Title	Role	Note(s)	Ref.
1998	Attige		Tele-serial	
2013	Bigg Boss Kannada	Self	Winner; Season 1	
2014	Nenapina Idiot-Box	Radio jockey		
2016–2018	Drama Juniors	Judge		
2017–2023	Dance Karnataka Dance	Judge		
2022	Dancing Champion	Judge		
2022	Super Queen	Judge		
2026	Raakshasa	SI Hanmappa		

== Discography ==
Year	Film	Song	Co Singer
2006	Sevanthi Sevanthi	"Jaaji Mallige Node"	Shreya Ghoshal
2008	Beladingalagi Baa	"Baa Maara"	Shamitha Malnad
2008	Ganesha Matthe Banda	"Gopika"	V. Manohar
2009	Namyajamanru	"Ee Hrudaya"	Nanditha
2011	Vinayaka Geleyara Balaga	"Yaarivalee Hudugi"	
2011	Vinayaka Geleyara Balaga	"Ganeshanige Garike"	Naveen Krishna, Shashank Sheshagiri
2014	Fair & Lovely	"Haage Ondu"	Vijayaa Shankar
2016	Nanna Ninna Prema Kathe	"Majabhhothagide"	Anuradha Bhat
2016	Akira	"Alisade Husiyagide"	
2017	Toss	"Yavude Sammandha"	
2018	Aduva Gombe	"Madarangee Madarangee"	Anuradha Bhat
2018	Kismath	"Preethiyallodane"	
2018	Kismath	"Kismath Theme"	

Preceded by Show created	Bigg Boss Kannada Winner (Series 1) 2013	Succeeded by Akul Balaji
