= Seetharam Benoy Case No. 18 =

Indian Kannada-language suspense thriller film

- Official poster
- Directed by: Devi Prasad Shetty
- Screenplay by: Deviprasad Shetty
- Story by: Deviprasad Shetty
- Produced by: Deviprasad Shetty; Sathvik Hebbar; MRP
- Starring: Vijay Raghavendra
- Cinematography: Hemanth
- Edited by: Shashank Narayan
- Music by: Gagan Baderiya
- Production company: Elephant Path Film Factory
- Distributed by: Sridharkrupa Combines
- Release date: 15 August 2021
- Country: India
- Language: Kannada

Seetharam Benoy Case No. 18 is a 2021 Indian Kannada-language suspense thriller directed by Devi Prasad Shetty and starring Vijay Raghavendra as Seetharam. The film released on 15 August 2021 on Star Suvarna.. The sequel of this movie was released in 2026 as Second Case of Seetharam

== Plot ==
Seetharam, an upright and principled sub-inspector, is transferred from Haveri to the rural Aanegadde police station in Shivamogga district. Although the village appears calm, it has been experiencing a series of carefully executed burglaries and violent incidents that have unsettled the local community.

After assuming charge, Seetharam becomes personally involved when his residence is targeted during a burglary. The methodical nature of the crime leads him to suspect that the incidents are not isolated. As he begins investigating, Seetharam identifies patterns linking the recent offences to an unresolved case locally referred to as Case No. 18.

Through systematic inquiry, analysis of evidence, and interactions with villagers, Seetharam uncovers a network behind the crimes. His investigation is complicated by limited institutional support, local tensions, and the reluctance of residents to cooperate. As the criminal activities escalate, Seetharam narrows his focus on key suspects and pieces together the motives underlying the offences.

The investigation culminates in a confrontation that reveals the connections between the crimes and the earlier case. The resolution highlights Seetharam’s efforts to restore order while reflecting the broader social consequences of the events within the village.

== Cast ==
- Vijay Raghavendra as Seetharam
- Nagaraj S. C.
- Sreeharsha Gobhatt as Naga
- Devi Prakash
- Sathvik Hebbar
- Akshatha Shivakumar
- Bindu Rakshidi as Seetharam's wife
- Suresh S. H.
- Manju L. S.
- Prathap
- Vikram
- Chethan Rayanahalli
- Shashank Narayana
- Lakshmi Devi
- Ganesh Biligi
- Naveen Talari
- Kumar Reddy
- Tippanna B. V.

== Production ==
The film was shot in Thirthahalli, in Karnataka, India.

== Reception ==
Vinay Lokesh of The Times of India rated the film two-and-a-half out of five stars and wrote that "In his 50th film in the Kannada film industry, lead actor Vijay Raghavendra excels in his role as a cop, but the story could have been tighter for the edge-of-the-seat experience it was supposed to have been". Vivek M. V. of Deccan Herald stated that "It's tough to get emotionally attached to the lead character because his personal life is shoddily showcased. Perhaps due to budgetary constraints, the film is filled with fresh faces who struggle to hold our attention". Bobby Sing of The Free Press Journal wrote that "In all, it’s the sincere performance of Vijay and the technical merits that save the film from being a routine, below-average attempt. But the plot certainly deserved to be presented distinctively as an elaborate narration of just one case". Prathibha Joy of OTT Play opined that "Seetharam Benoy: Case No 18 gets off to a promising start, but falters along the way in execution".
