= Rishika Singh =

Indian actress

- Born: Rohini Singh; Bangalore
- Occupation: Actress
- Parent: Rajendra Singh Babu (father)
- Family: Aditya (brother)

Rishika Singh (born Rohini Singh) is an Indian actor who appears in Kannada-language films. She is the daughter of film director Rajendra Singh Babu and granddaughter of Mysore-based film producer Shankar Singh and former Kannada actress Pratima Devi. Her brother Aditya is an actor in Kannada films.

== Early life ==
Rishika Singh was born as Rohini Singh to film director Rajendra Singh Babu in Bengaluru. She was born to a family of film personalities with her grandfather Shankar Singh being a film producer and grandmother Pratima Devi, a Kannada film actress. She is the niece of Sangram Singh and actors Vijayalakshmi Singh and Jai Jagadish.

She completed her graduation from Mount Carmel College, Bangalore, in the year 2008.

== Career ==
Rishika Singh made her debut in films in the 2011 Kannada-language film Kanteerava. She then appeared in the multi-starrer comedy film Kalla Malla Sulla in the same year. In 2012, Singh hosted a talk show titled Ragale with Rishika that aired on Zee Kannada. In 2013, she got into a controversy after her morphed obscene video clip was uploaded on a social website by the actor-director S. K. Basheed of her film Benki Birugali, against whom she filed a case. She was one of the contestants in the reality TV show Bigg Boss in its first season. She appeared in an item song for Maanikya (2014).

== Personal life ==
Rishika Singh was engaged to Sandeep, a businessman from Bangalore in December 2012. However, the wedding was called off, following which Singh was hospitalized due to a nervous breakdown.

== Filmography ==
Year	Film	Role	Notes
2011	Kanteerava	Kasturi	
2011	Kalla Malla Sulla	Sanjana	
2012	Katari Veera Surasundarangi	Herself	Special appearance
2013	Benki Birugali	Lakshmi	
2014	Maanikya	Herself	Special appearance
2018	Tunturu	Sneha	

== Television ==
Year	Show	Role
2013	Bigg Boss Kannada	Contestant
2012	Ragale With Rishika	Herself (Host)
