= Chitraloka.com =

Indian website about Kannada cinema

- Website type: Online portal
- Founded: 26 June 2000; 26 years ago
- Area served: Worldwide
- Founder: K. M. Veeresh
- Industry: Entertainment
- Products: News and updates on Kannada cinema
- Website: chitraloka.com

Chitraloka.com is an Indian website focused on the Kannada film industry. Launched on 26 June 2000 by K. M. Veeresh, it was the first dedicated online portal for Kannada cinema. The website provides news, updates, and features on Kannada films and is available in both English and Kannada. Alongside Viggy.com, it was among the few websites in the early 2000s regularly covering Kannada cinema.

== History ==
K. M. Veeresh, a photographer and journalist, conceived the idea for Chitraloka.com during a vacation in Singapore, where he struggled to access updates on Kannada cinema. After acquiring a personal computer, he aimed to create a website to serve news on Kannada cinema, primarily for Kannada-speaking audiences overseas, particularly in the Gulf and the United States. Initially, he faced challenges in sourcing software that could support Kannada script. The website was launched in 1999, with Parvathamma Rajkumar present at the event.

On its launch day, the website recorded 13,664 visits. In its early years, the website was primarily operated by Veeresh himself, with support from journalist colleagues as needed. During the kidnapping of Rajkumar, Chitraloka.com provided comprehensive updates on the incident. Initially updated biweekly, the website's content is now refreshed frequently.

In 2009, Chitraloka.com was recognized by the Limca Book of Records for showcasing 3,000 Kannada film stills, ranging from Sati Sulochana (1935) to Namyajamanru (2009). In 2020, the website's YouTube channel received the Silver Creator Award, making it one of the few Kannada-language channels to achieve this distinction.
