= Jaga Mechida Huduga =

- Directed by: H. R. Bhargava
- Screenplay by: Chi. Udaya Shankar
- Based on: Nishaanth by Sai Suthe
- Produced by: S. A. Srinivas
- Starring: Shiva Rajkumar; Ragini; Srinath; Lakshmi
- Cinematography: D. V. Rajaram
- Edited by: Anand; Mahendra
- Music by: Rajan–Nagendra
- Production company: Sri Chowdeshwari Art Combines
- Release date: 3 December 1993
- Running time: 142 minutes
- Country: India
- Language: Kannada

Jaga Mechhida Huduga is a 1993 Indian Kannada-language romance film, directed by H. R. Bhargava. The story is based on the novel Nishaanth, by Sai Suthe. The film stars Shiva Rajkumar, Srinath, Ragini, Lakshmi and Tiger Prabhakar. The film was widely appreciated for its songs and story upon release. Added to Shivaraj kumar successful movies and celebrated 100 days. The songs composed by Rajan–Nagendra duo were huge hits.

== Cast ==
- Shiva Rajkumar as Shivu
- Srinath as Mohan Rao
- Ragini as Asha
- Lakshmi as Bhavani, Mohan Rao's wife
- Tiger Prabhakar as SP Nagaraj Rao
- Chi Guru Dutt as Srikanth, Mohan Rao's son
- K. S. Ashwath as Shrikanta Shastri
- M. P. Shankar as Pailwan Nanjanna
- Vijay Raghavendra as young Shivu
- Ramesh Bhat as Kittappa
- Pandari Bai as Bhavani's mother
- Shani Mahadevappa
- M. S. Karanth
- Lalithasree

== Soundtrack ==
The music of the film was composed by Rajan–Nagendra.

Track listing
No.	Title	Lyrics	Singer(s)	Length
1.	"Aakashave Nanna Thande"	Chi. Udaya Shankar	S. P. Balasubrahmanyam
2.	"Manadalli Neene"	Chi. Udaya Shankar	S. P. Balasubrahmanyam, Manjula Gururaj
3.	"Ittanthe Iruvenu Shivane"	Chi. Udaya Shankar	S. P. Balasubrahmanyam
4.	"Attheya Magane"	Chi. Udaya Shankar	S. P. Balasubrahmanyam, Manjula Gururaj
5.	"Ello Udurida Hoovu"	Chi. Udaya Shankar	Rajkumar
