= Benki Birugali (2013 film) =

- Directed by: S. K. Basheed
- Written by: S. K. Basheed
- Produced by: S K Karimunnisa
- Starring: Rishi; S. K. Basheed; Namitha; Sandhya; Rishika Singh; Rekha Vedavyas; Monica
- Cinematography: K. S. Cheluvaraj
- Edited by: S Manohar
- Music by: M. M. Srilekha
- Production company: SBK Film Corporation
- Release date: 26 April 2013
- Running time: 135 minutes
- Country: India
- Language: Kannada

Benki Birugali (Fire and Storm) is a 2013 Indian Kannada action comedy film directed and produced by S. K. Basheed. It was his debut in Kannada cinema as a lead actor. The film also has Rishi, Sandhya, Rekha Vedavyas, Monica, Rishika Singh and Bhanu Sri Mehra. K. S. Cheluvaraj was the cinematographer and M. M. Srilekha composed the music. The film was announced in January 2011. It was shot at various locations in Karnataka and Andhra Pradesh. The film was released to negative reviews.

Benki Birugali was released on 26 April 2013. The film was supposed to be originally a bilingual – Telugu and Kannada – however, the Telugu version was not released.

== Cast ==
- Rishi as Chandu
- S. K. Basheed as Daya
- Namitha as Mona
- Sandhya as Sandhya
- Rekha Vedavyas as Rekha
- Rishika Singh
- Bhanu Sri Mehra
- Saloni Aswani
- Monica
- Bullet Prakash
- Layendra Kokila
- Bank Janardhan

== Reception ==
A critic from The Times of India wrote that "It is the best example of how not to direct a movie".
