= Kavitha Lankesh =

Indian film director

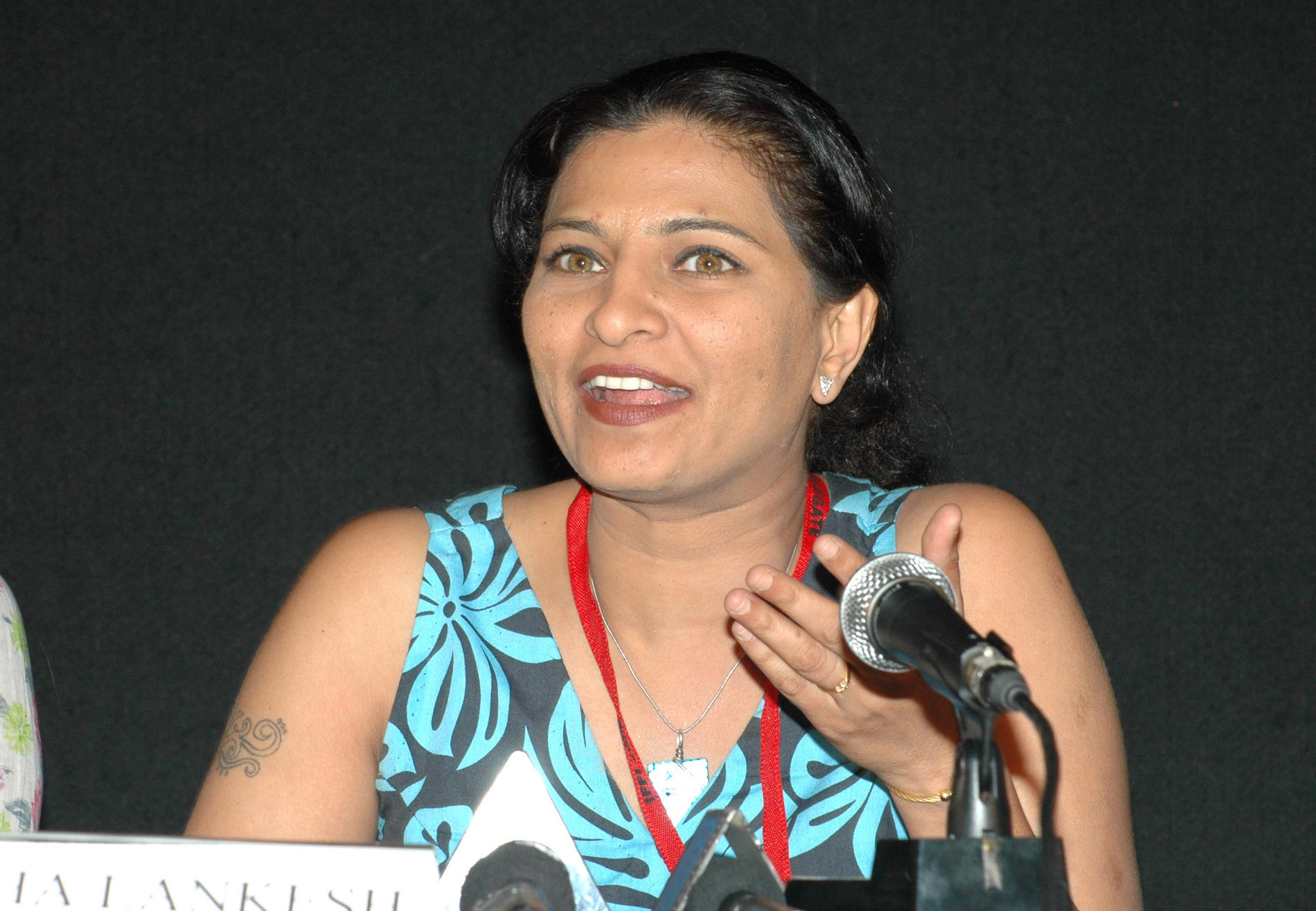
- Lankesh at the IFFI (2006)
- Born: 13 December 1974 (age 51); Bangalore, Karnataka, India
- Education: Bangalore University
- Occupation: Film director
- Notable work: Deveeri (1999)
- Children: 1
- Parent(s): P. Lankesh; Indira
- Relatives: Gauri Lankesh (sister); Indrajit Lankesh (brother)
- Website: Official website

Kavitha Lankesh is an Indian film director, screenwriter and a lyricist known for her work in Kannada cinema industry. She began as a documentary film-maker before directing her first feature film, Deveeri (1999), which went on to win international, national and state awards. She is considered to be one of the renowned film-makers of Kannada cinema. She has directed and produced more than fifty documentaries and informational films, along with over forty corporate films. Some of the films Kavitha directed have won awards and accolades from critics.

== Early life and background ==
Kavitha was born in Bangalore to journalist P. Lankesh and Indira. Her mother runs a sari shop in Bangalore. Kavitha hails from a prominent family of journalists and media publishers. Her father P. Lankesh founded the highly successful weekly tabloid Lankesh Patrike. She has two siblings, Indrajit and Gauri. Her brother is also a film-maker and her sister, Gauri Lankesh, was the chief editor of the tabloid. Kavitha holds a master's in English Literature from Bangalore University and a diploma in advertising. Before her film career, Kavitha owned an advertisement agency. Kavitha decided to remain single. Instead, Kavitha is a single mother by choice to her daughter, Esha Lankesh. She now lives in a suburb of Bangalore with her daughter and her two Labradors.

== Career ==
Kavitha started in films with a series of documentaries. She has made films about Bannerghatta National Park in Bangalore, the Siddi tribe, and Ninasam, a cultural organization that promotes the development of theater and films. Kavithas first documentary was on a children's nature camp. She went to more than 50 documentaries and corporate films. Deveeri, a movie based on a short story by P. Lankesh, Akka, represented Kavitha's debut as a feature film director. The film stars Nandita Das, Bhavana, Master Manja, Kashi, B. Jayashree. Deveeri won Kavitha Lankesh state, national and international awards, including the International Critics Award, National Debut Director Award, and the Aravindan Puraskaram for best debutante director in 2000. Deveeri participated in eighteen international film festivals and won nine awards. Kavitha's second film was Alemaari was never released. The film has Bhavana and Prakash Raj in the lead roles. Kavitha wrote the story and screenplay and directed Bimba. The film has Raksha, Prakash Raj, Daisy Bopanna and Sampath Kumar in the lead roles. Bimba was selected to compete in the Bangkok film festival and received raving reviews from critics. Kavitha wrote and directed Preethi Prema Pranaya, a drama film, in 2003. It won the National Film Award for Best Feature Film in Kannada and the Karnataka State Film Award for Best Story and was a commercial hit running for 100 days in theaters across Karnataka. Malgudi Days was a Hindi television series originally directed by Shankar Nag, but was revived in 2006 with Kavitha as director. The reviews were positive. Kavitha also wrote and directed Tananam Tananam, a romantic musical drama in 2006. The story was based on a Tamil story written by Kalki. This film debuts Tamil actor, Shaam, with Ramya and Rakshita in the lead roles. Although the film had average to negative responses from critics, it won at Filmfare Awards South for Best Actress and Best Lyricist. Kavitha directed Avva, a Kannada drama film, in 2008. The film was based on a novel, Mussanjeya Katha Prasanga, written by her father. The film has Shruti, Duniya Vijay and Smitha in the lead roles. The film had many positive reviews from critics and won awards at the Karnataka State Film Awards for Best Supporting Actress and Best Story writer. Kavitha also directed Crazy Loka in 2012. The stars of the film were V. Ravichandran and Daisy Bopanna. Crazy loka was commercially successful but a film that Kavitha is not proud of because of many ' uncontrolled factors'. Kavitha directed and produced a socially relevant film, Kariya Kan Bitta. The film stars Pradyumna a child artist who won the state award and also had Duniya Vijay, Yogesh, Srinagar Kitty, and Anu Prabhakar. The film won rave reviews across the state. Kavitha Lankesh also runs a resort exclusively for children called Grameen Camp which introduces school children to various traditional village games and life styles as well educate them about farming.

== Filmography ==
Year	Title	Language	Notes
1999	Deveeri	Kannada	
2003	Preethi Prema Pranaya	Kannada	National Award for Best Regional Film; Karnataka State Film Award for Best Story
2004	Bimba	Kannada	Karnataka State Award for Best Screenplay
2006	Malgudi Days	Hindi	Television series; season 4
2006	Tananam Tananam	Kannada	
2008	Avva	Kannada	Karnataka State Film Award for Best Story
2012	Crazy Loka	Kannada	
2013	Kariya Kan Bitta	Kannada	
2018	Summer Holidays	English; Kannada	Children's film
2023	Gauri	English	Documentary

Kavitha Lankesh has also served as Jury for many festivals -International Film Festival of India, Kerala State Awards, Jagran Film Festival and the Oscar film selection.
