= Sri Kshetra Adichunchanagiri =

- Official poster
- Directed by: Om Sai Prakash
- Written by: Gotoori (dialogues)
- Screenplay by: Om Sai Prakash
- Story by: Srigala Amruthavani; Adichunchanagiri Mata
- Produced by: B V Narasimhayya
- Starring: Ambareesh; Sriimurali; Ramkumar; Shivakumar; Harish Raj
- Cinematography: Sundarnath Suvarna
- Edited by: M S Raj
- Music by: Gurukiran
- Release date: 6 July 2012
- Country: India
- Language: Kannada

Sri Kshetra Adichunchanagiri is a 2012 Indian Kannada-language devotional film directed by Om Sai Prakash starring Ambareesh, Sriimurali, Ramkumar, Shivakumar and Harish Raj.

== Cast ==
- Ambareesh as a king
- Sriimurali as Balagangadharanatha Swamiji
- Ramkumar
- Shivakumar
- Harish Raj as Narada Muni
- Ravi Chethan as Kalabhairaveshwara
- Jayanthi
- Shruti
- Anu Prabhakar
- Padma Vasanthi
- C. P. Yogeshwara
- B. C. Patil
- Cheluvarayaswamy
- H. Vishwanath
- K. Abhayachandra Jain
- H. C. Balakrishna
- C. S. Puttarajau
- M. Putte Gowda
- K. B. Chandrasheka
- Suresh Gowda
- Ramaswamy Gowda
- Ramesh Bandisidde Gowda
- M. Srinivas
- L. R. Shivarame Gowda
- H. M. Revanna
- H. T. Krishnappa
- Doddarangegowda
- B. Ramakrishna
- Ashwathanarayana
- Ashok Kheny
- T. S. Nagabharana
- Om Sai Prakash
- Nagathihalli Chandrashekhar
- Mohan Juneja
- Ramesh Bhat
- Karibasavaiah
- Bullet Prakash
- Balagangadharanatha Swamiji as himself

== Production ==
Director Om Sai Prakash decided to make a devotional and mythological film and consulted Balagangadharanatha Swamiji before working on the film. Murali, whose career was at a low at the time, decided to accept the role of Balagangadharanatha Swamiji as Om Sai Prakash delivered several successful films. To prepare for the role of Balagangadharanatha Swamiji, Murali shaved his head. For months, he ate only vegetarian food, did not drink alcohol and called people as "my child". Forty political leaders play roles in the film. Sundarnath Suvarna of Sri Manjunatha (2001) fame was brought in as the cinematographer after Om Sai Prakash was impressed by his work. A procession for Balagangadharanatha Swamiji from Freedom Park to Palace Grounds was recorded and used for the film.

== Soundtrack ==
The music was composed by Gurukiran. An audio release function was held on 29 January 2012 coinciding with the birthday of Sri Adhichunchanagiri Maha Samsthana Mutt.

All lyrics were composed by Doddarangegowda except where noted.

Track listing
No.	Title	Lyrics	Singer(s)	Length
1.	"Anna Akshara Arogya"	Goturi	Chetan Sosca	3:55
2.	"Banu Bhuvi Meerida"		S. P. Balasubrahmanyam	4:45
3.	"Chinmaya Roopada"		Gurukiran, Anuradha Bhat	2:22
4.	"Chunchanagiri Siri"		Gurukiran	4:08
5.	"Nimagaagiye"		S. P. Balasubrahmanyam	3:43
6.	"Shatha Shathamanada"		Gurukiran, Anuradha Bhat	4:08
7.	"Shloka"		Gurukiran	1:07
Total length:				24:09

== Release and reception ==
The film was released on 6 July 2012, and it was screened in theatres until August of the same year.

A critic from Prajavani criticised the film's narration while praising the performance of the actors.
