= Daisy Bopanna =

Indian actress

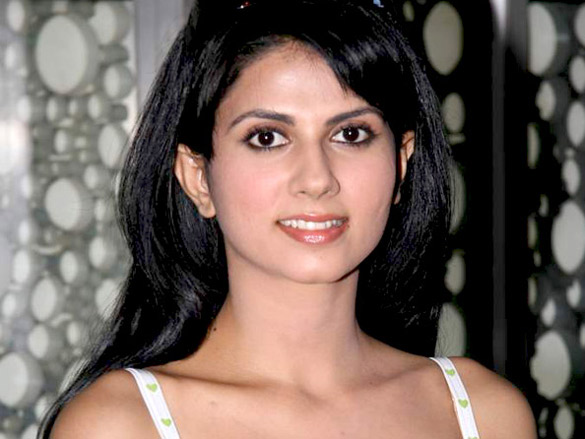
- Born: Daisy Bopanna; 4 December 1982 (age 43); Kodagu, Karnataka, India
- Occupation: Actress
- Years active: 2003–2012; 2024–

Daisy Bopanna (born 4 December 1982) is an Indian actress who appears in Kannada, Hindi, Telugu and Tamil-language films.

== Personal life ==
Bopanna is from Kodagu. She attended Aurobindo School, pre-university at Kumarans College and graduated with a Bachelor of Fine Arts degree from College of Fine Arts, Bengaluru in Bangalore, Karnataka.

== Career ==
Daisy started her career with theatre, working for a short time with B. Jayashree's Spandana theatre camp and also contemporary English theatre. She began filming for Bimba in 2002. It was screened at the Berlin & Frankfurt Film Festival, and won international awards. Directed by Kavitha Lankesh, it explored the exploitation of child artistes in the film industry. Daisy's later work in Bhagawan (2004) with Darshan earned her the moniker 'Spicy Daisy'. Prior to the release of Bimba in 2004, Daisy worked as a presenter of the television series Top Drive that was telecast on Star World for nearly one year.

== Filmography ==
| Year | Film | Role | Language | Notes |
|---|---|---|---|---|
| 2003 | Indru Mudhal | Geethanjali | Tamil | |
| 2004 | Bimba | Saroja | Kannada | |
| 2004 | Chanti | Anjali | Telugu | credited as Anjali |
| 2005 | Bhagawan | Anjali | Kannada | credited as Anjali |
| 2005 | Relax | Anjali | Telugu | credited as Anjali |
| 2005 | Garam Masala | Deepti | Hindi | credited as Daisy |
| 2005 | Rama Shama Bhama | Priya | Kannada | |
| 2006 | Jackpot | | Kannada | Cameo |
| 2006 | Prajapathi | Film actress | Malayalam | |
| 2006 | Aishwarya | Anjali | Kannada | |
| 2006 | Thavarina Siri | Priya | Kannada | |
| 2006 | Tananam Tananam | Gowda's daughter | Kannada | |
| 2007 | Sathyavan Savithri | Subbalakshmi | Kannada | |
| 2008 | Gaalipata | Sowmya | Kannada | Nominated—Filmfare Award for Best Actress – Kannada |
| 2008 | Chakkara Viyugam | Sandhya | Tamil | |
| 2009 | Sweet Heart | Sandhya | Telugu | |
| 2009 | Olave Jeevana Lekkachaara | | Kannada | Cameo |
| 2011 | United Six | Jia | Hindi | |
| 2012 | Crazy Loka | Sarala | Kannada | |
| 2024 | Rush | Kartika | Telugu | |
| 2026 | Birbal Trioligy: Case 2 † | TBA | Kannada | Completed |
