= B. C. Patil =

Indian politician and actor

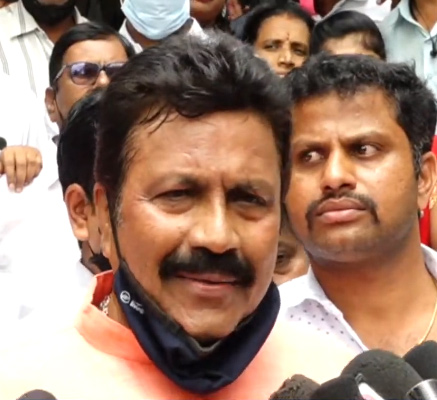
- Patil in 2020

Minister of Agriculture Department Government of Karnataka
- In office 7 February 2020 – 13 May 2023
- Chief Minister: B. S. Yediyurappa
- Preceded by: Krishna Byre Gowda
- Succeeded by: N. Chaluvaraya Swamy

Member of the Karnataka Legislative Assembly
- In office 24 May 2004 – 18 May 2013
- Preceded by: B. H. Bannikod
- Succeeded by: U. B. Banakar
- Constituency: Hirekerur

Personal details
- Born: Basavanagowda Channabasavanagowda Patil; 14 November 1956 (age 69) Yaliwal, Mysore State, India
- Party: Bharatiya Janata Party (2019–present)
- Other political affiliations: Indian National Congress (2008–2019); Janata Dal (Secular) (2004–2008)
- Spouse: Vanaja
- Children: 2
- Occupation: Actor; filmmaker; politician; police officer

Basavanagowda Channabasavanagowda Patil (born 14 November 1956), commonly known as B. C. Patil, is an Indian politician, actor, filmmaker and former police officer. He served as the Minister of Agriculture in the Government of Karnataka from 2020 to 2023. He has represented the Hirekerur Assembly constituency in the Karnataka Legislative Assembly in three terms.

Before entering politics, Patil worked with the Karnataka State Police from 1979 to 2002. He later worked in the Kannada film industry as an actor, director and producer.

== Early life ==
Patil was born on 14 November 1956 to Channabasavanagowda Patil and Shivamma. He is married to Vanaja, and they have two daughters, Sowmya and Srushti. He belongs to the Sadar Lingayats community.

After completing a Bachelor of Arts degree, Patil joined the Karnataka State Police in 1979 and received training at the Police Training College in Mysore. While serving as a police officer, he also pursued acting. He took extended leave from the police service to work in films and was subsequently issued a suspension notice. Patil voluntarily retired from the police service in 2002.

== Film career ==
Patil stated that "[f]ilms came [his] way almost by accident". He made his debut with the Sunil Kumar Desai film, Sangharsha (1993). This film was a commercial failure. He then produced and acted in Patil's next, Nishkarsha (1993), which turned to be a commercial success, completing a 100-day run at the theatres. His next few films as producer failed to make money leading him to "...to sell a house in Davangere" to cover the losses.

On director S. Mahendar's insistence, he produced and starred in Kowrava (1998), which emerged as a commercial success. He proceeded to appear in a string of inconsequential roles, including films such as Shivappa Nayaka (2001) and Surya IPS (2002), all of which underperformed commercially. Shaapa (2001), which he produced and starred in, alongside Ramesh Aravind and Anu Prabhakar, and directed by his brother Ashok, was received well by audiences. However, it failed to perform commercially.

Patil has acted in the films like Jogula. His performance in Nishkarsha was much appreciated by Vishnuvardhan. So far, he has acted in more than 25 films.

== Filmography ==
=== As actor ===
- Sangharsha (1993)
- Nishkarsha (1993)
- Mahakshathriya (1994)
- Curfew (1994)
- Poorna Sathya (1994)
- Jaana (1994)
- Kiladigalu (1994)
- Maha Chatura (1995)
- Nirbandha (1996)
- Ellaranthalla Nanna Ganda (1997)
- Thavarina Theru (1997)
- Jai Hind (1998)
- Kowrava (1998)
- Dalavayi (1999)
- Premachari (1999)
- Chennappa Channegowda (1999)
- Tiger Padmini (2000)
- Hats Off India (2000)
- Astra (2000)
- Krishnarjuna (2000)
- Lankesha (2001)
- Shaapa (2001)
- Kanoonu (2001)
- Shivappa Nayaka (2001)
- Hattura Odeya (2002)
- Chelvi (2002)
- Surya IPS (2003)
- Jogula (2003)
- Kutumba (2003)
- Devasura (2004)
- Zabardast (2005)
- Bombugalu Saar Bombugalu (2007)
- Dadagiri (2007)
- Salute (2009)
- Niranthara (2010)
- Tharangini (2010)
- Bhramara (2011)
- 9 to 12 (2011)
- Sri Kshetra Adi Chunchanagiri (2012)
- Prarthane (2012)
- Pungi Daasa (2014)
- Sri Guru Thipperudraswamy Mahathme (2014)
- Ond Chance Kodi (2015)
- Mahaveera Machideva (2016)
- Happy New Year (2017)
- Kaafi Thota (2017)
- Kaafi Thota (2017)
- Rajahamsa (2017)
- Nan Magale Heroine (2017)
- Garadi (2023)

=== As director ===
- Lankesha (2001)
- Shivappa Nayaka (2001)
- Hatthura Odeya (2002)
- Surya IPS (2003)
- Salute (2009)
