= Sahukara =

- Title card
- Directed by: Om Prakash Rao
- Written by: Ravi Srivatsa (dialogues)
- Screenplay by: K. S. Ravikumar
- Story by: Priyadarshan
- Produced by: K. Manju
- Starring: V. Ravichandran; Vishnuvardhan; Rambha; Shashikumar; Anu Prabhakar
- Cinematography: G. S. V. Seetharam
- Edited by: S. Manohar
- Music by: Rajesh Ramanath (music sourced from A. R. Rahman's Muthu)
- Production company: Lakshmishree Combines
- Release date: 24 September 2004
- Running time: 156 minutes
- Country: India
- Language: Kannada

Sahukara is a 2004 Indian Kannada-language masala film directed by Om Prakash Rao and produced by K. Manju. It stars V. Ravichandran, Vishnuvardhan, Shashikumar, Rambha, and Anu Prabhakar. It was a remake of the Tamil film Muthu (1995), which was itself based on the Malayalam film Thenmavin Kombath (1994).

The film was released on 24 September 2004 to generally positive reviews from critics, became one of the blockbuster hits of 2004, and successfully screened for about 25 weeks in cinema halls.

== Cast ==
- V. Ravichandran as Muthu
- Vishnuvardhan as Sahukara Raja Ravi Varma
- Rambha as Ranganayaki
- Shashikumar as Raja (Sahukara)
- Anu Prabhakar
- Rangayana Raghu as Jamindar Benkiyappa
- Sumithra
- Dharma
- Jolly Bastin
- Junior Narasimharaju
- Mandeep Roy
- Prakash Shenoy
- Sarigama Viji
- Bullet Prakash
- Tension Nagaraj
- Sridhar Raj
- Bhanu Prakash
- Honnavalli Krishna
- Mohan Juneja
- Tennis Krishna as Krishna
- Ramesh Bhat
- Ashalatha
- Padmini
- Jyothi Lakshmi
- Sundar Raj as Rajashekar
- Shivaji Rao Jadhav
- Om Prakash Rao in a special appearance

== Production ==
Vishnuvardhan said he accepted to work in the film "out of inspiration from Rajnikanth". The film's first schedule began on 14 January 2004. The film was partly shot in Kerala.

== Soundtrack ==
Rajesh Ramanath used all the tunes and re-arranged the instrumentation from the original soundtrack of Muthu composed by A. R. Rahman.

No.	Title	Lyrics	Singer(s)	Length
1.	"Kokkare Koli Chendu"	K. Kalyan	S. P. Balasubrahmanyam, B. Jayashree
2.	"Obbane Obbane Yejamana"	K. Kalyan	S. P. Balasubrahmanyam
3.	"Thunta Thunta Thunta"	K. Kalyan	Mano, K. S. Chithra
4.	"Malayaliya Pada"	K. Kalyan	Udit Narayan, K. S. Chithra
5.	"Yaarilli Ee Tharaha"	K. Kalyan	Hariharan

== Reception ==
K. N. Venkatasubba Rao of The Hindu wrote "Lakshmi Sri Combines Saahukara, a remake of Tamil blockbuster Muthu, starring Rajnikant, (original Malayalam) is a classic example of how taste can be corrupted by shifting importance from thematic essence to artistes' image-refurbishing exercise and cheap pranks in place of pure comedy". A critic from Viggy.com wrote " Though is a remake (of Tamil film Mutthu), producer Manju has made an effort to make his latest movie Sahukara look 'rich' in all aspects. Credit goes to director Om Prakash Rao for handling this multi-starrer movie and a balanced presentation. Though is not an unusual story, it has everything to be a family entertainer".

S. N. Deepak of Deccan Herald wrote "Ravichandran has put in a good performance though the role is not much different from the ones he played earlier. Sashikumar is okay" but praised Vishnuvardhan "his saint-like role is small, impresses" and called Rangayana Raghu as "convincing villain" while also praising technical elements citing "Cinematography by Seetharam adds colours to the film. Music by Ramesh Ramanath is good".

A critic from Sify wrote "Sahukara is a remake of Tamil film Muthu, which itself was a remake of a Malayalam film directed by Priyadarshan. The glorious production values are a treat to watch along with the selection of artistes and technicians that are apt. The only problem that lacks in the film is the action scenes which are not well conceived". Anjali of Indiainfo wrote, "The costumes and the sets look elegant. On the whole, SAHUKARA is a complete family package filled with action, sentiment, love and comedy". A critic from IANS wrote, "Sahukara is a film for the masses. But it could have been a better film, were it not a frame-by-frame copy of the original".
