= Kaurava (film) =

Indian romantic drama film

- Directed by: S. Mahendar
- Screenplay by: S. Mahendar
- Dialogues by: B. A. Madhu
- Story by: K. Somasundreshwar
- Produced by: Channabasavagowda Patil
- Starring: B. C. Patil; Prema
- Cinematography: Krishna Kumar
- Edited by: P. R. Soundar Raj
- Music by: Hamsalekha
- Production company: Soumya Films
- Release date: 20 October 1998
- Country: India
- Language: Kannada

Kaurava is a 1998 Indian Kannada-language romantic drama film directed by S. Mahendar. The film stars B. C. Patil and Prema in the lead roles. The core theme of the movie is loosely based on the Tamil film Kadalora Kavithaigal (1986). The film was remade in Telugu as Kauravudu (2000). The film has a namesake sequel Once More Kaurava (2017).

== Cast ==
- B. C. Patil as Surya
- Prema as Shashi
- Shivaram
- Tennis Krishna
- Bank Janardhan
- B. Jayashree

== Production ==
The film marked the acting debut of Patil as lead actor after playing negative roles and suffered losses as producer. Mahendar insisted he become a lead actor by producing the film. Venkatesh made his debut as stunt choreographer this film and later adapted the film's title as prefix.

== Soundtrack ==
Kowrava

Soundtrack album by Hamsalekha
- Released: 1998
- Genre: Feature film soundtrack
- Length: 35:15
- Language: Kannada
- Label: Akash Audio

Hamsalekha chronology
Preethsod Thappa (1998)	Kowrava (1998)	Chandrodaya (1999)
External audio
- Kowrava – Jukebox on YouTube

Soundtrack was composed by Hamsalekha.

All lyrics are written by Hamsalekha.

Track listing
No.	Title	Singer(s)	Length
1.	"Kukkukku (Female)"	K. S. Chithra	5:06
2.	"Hello Hello Kauravesha"	L. N. Shastri, Latha Hamsalekha, Murali, Badri Prasad, Ramesh Chandra, Mangala, Suma, Kusuma	5:02
3.	"Avalyavalo"	B. Jayashree	5:33
4.	"Hudugirandre"	L. N. Shastri	4:48
5.	"Ilakal Seere"	L. N. Shastri, Kusuma	5:04
6.	"Yenaitho"	Ramesh Chandra	4:36
7.	"Ku Ku (Male)"	Rajesh Krishnan	5:06
Total length:			35:15

== Reception ==
Y. Maheshwara Reddy of The Indian Express wrote "This is a remake of a Tamil film ‘Kadalora Kavithaigal’ but it's a fine example of how a good film can be made when the director handles the story simply. BC Patil, who is also producer of the film, steals the show with his performance in the lead role".
