= Hirekerur Assembly constituency =

Legislative Assembly constituency in Karnataka State, India

Coordinates: 14.45°N 75.39°E

Hirekerur
- Constituency No. 86 for the Karnataka Legislative Assembly

Constituency details
- Country: India
- Region: South India
- State: Karnataka
- District: Haveri
- Lok Sabha constituency: Haveri
- Established: 1951
- Total electors: 185,982
- Reservation: None

Member of Legislative Assembly
- 16th Karnataka Legislative Assembly
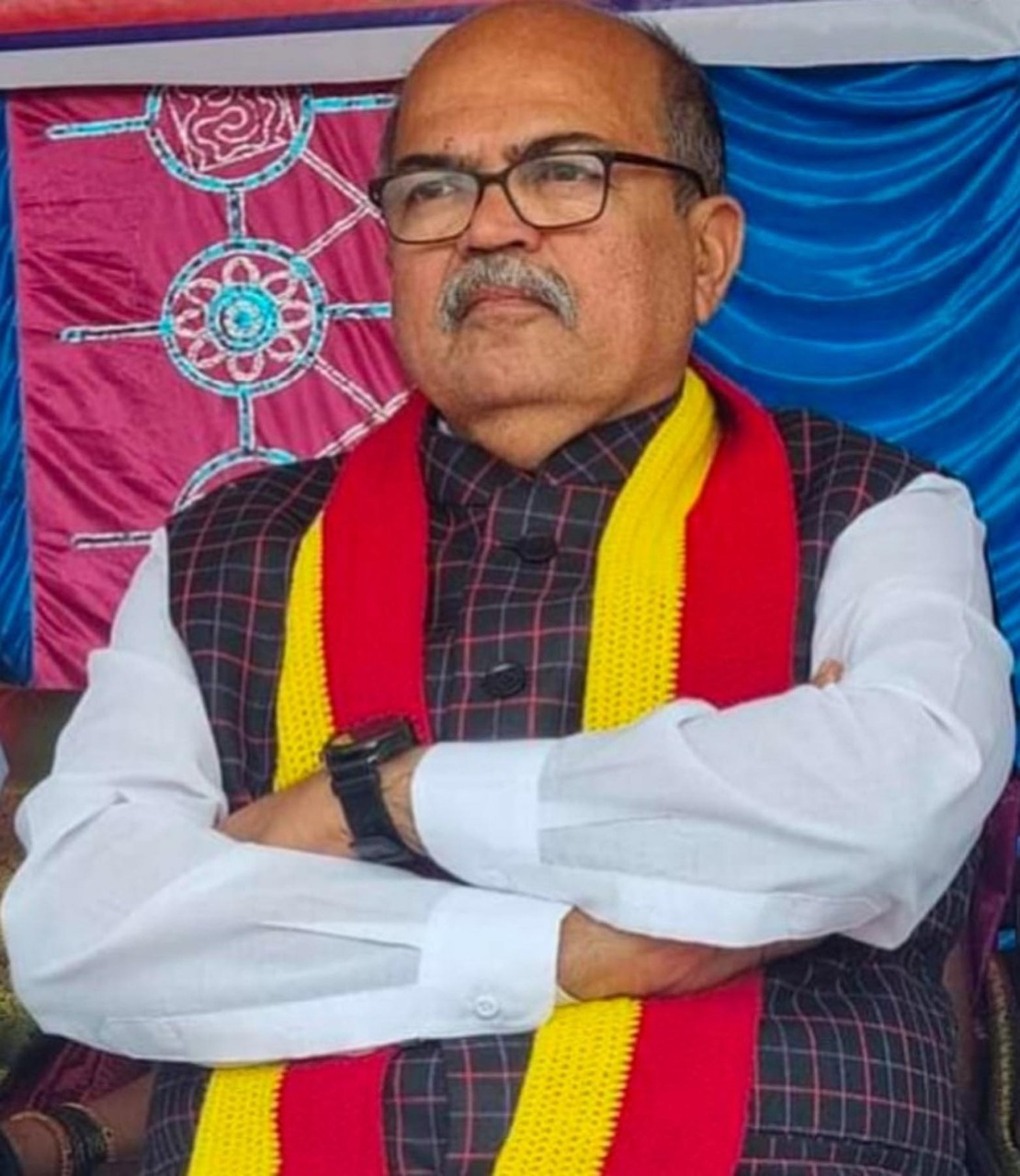
- Incumbent U. B. Banakar
- Party: Indian National Congress
- Elected year: 2023
- Preceded by: B. C. Patil

Hirekerur Assembly constituency is one of the 224 Legislative Assembly constituencies of Karnataka in India.

It is part of Haveri district.

Most Successful parties from Hirekerur assembly constituency in General elections
1. INC (8 Times) (47.2%)
2. IND(3 times) (17.6%)
3. JD(S)(2 times) (11.8%)
4. BJP (2 times) (11.8%)
5. Janata Party (1 time) (5.88%)
6. KJP(1 time) (5.88%)

== Members of the Legislative Assembly ==
Election	Member	Party
1952	Veeranagouda Veerbasagouda Patil	Indian National Congress
1957	Gubbi Shankarrao Basalingappagouda	Indian National Congress
1962	Gubbi Shankarrao Basalingappagouda	Indian National Congress
1967	Gubbi Shankarrao Basalingappagouda	Indian National Congress
1972	Bankar Basavannappa Gadlappa	Indian National Congress
1978	Gubbi Shankarrao Basalingappagouda	Independent politician
1983	Bankar Basavannappa Gadlappa	Independent politician
1985	U. B. Banakar	Janata Party
1989	B. H. Bannikod	Janata Dal
1994	U. B. Banakar	Bharatiya Janata Party
1999	B. H. Bannikod	Independent politician
2004	B. C. Patil	Janata Dal
2008	B. C. Patil	Indian National Congress
2013	U. B. Banakar	Karnataka Janata Paksha
2018	B. C. Patil	Indian National Congress
2019 By-election	B. C. Patil	Bharatiya Janata Party
2023	U. B. Banakar	Indian National Congress

== Election results ==
=== Assembly Election 2023 ===
2023 Karnataka Legislative Assembly election : Hirekerur
Party	Candidate	Votes	%	±%
INC	U. B. Banakar	85,378	53.53%	▲14.37
BJP	Basavanagouda Patil	70,358	44.11%	▼15.20
JD(S)	Jayananda Javannanavar	1,847	1.16%	New
NOTA	None of the above	953	0.60%	▲0.05
Margin of victory		15,020	9.42%	▼10.73
Turnout		159,658	85.85%	▲6.87
Total valid votes		159,497		
Registered electors		185,982		▲1.30
INC gain from BJP		Swing	▼5.78	

=== Assembly By-election 2019 ===
2019 Karnataka Legislative Assembly by-election : Hirekerur
Party	Candidate	Votes	%	±%
BJP	B. C. Patil	85,562	59.31%	▲11.58
INC	Bannikod Basappa Hanumantappa	56,495	39.16%	▼8.94
NOTA	None of the above	789	0.55%	▼0.10
Margin of victory		29,067	20.15%	▲19.78
Turnout		145,004	78.98%	▼5.15
Total valid votes		144,268		
Registered electors		183,590		▲2.36
BJP gain from INC		Swing	▲11.21	

=== Assembly Election 2018 ===
2018 Karnataka Legislative Assembly election : Hirekerur
Party	Candidate	Votes	%	±%
INC	B. C. Patil	72,461	48.10%	▲16.68
BJP	Ujaneshwara Banakar	71,906	47.73%	▲45.73
JD(S)	Siddappa Gudadappanavar	3,597	2.39%	▲1.21
NOTA	None of the above	972	0.65%	New
Margin of victory		555	0.37%	▼1.27
Turnout		150,890	84.13%	▲2.04
Total valid votes		150,646		
Registered electors		179,355		▲10.70
INC gain from KJP		Swing	▲15.04	

=== Assembly Election 2013 ===
2013 Karnataka Legislative Assembly election : Hirekerur
Party	Candidate	Votes	%	±%
KJP	U. B. Banakar	52,623	33.06%	New
INC	B. C. Patil	50,017	31.42%	▲0.45
Independent	B. H. Bannikod	10,579	6.65%	New
BSRCP	H. M. Ashok	3,399	2.14%	New
BJP	Palakshagouda. H. Patil	3,177	2.00%	▼16.97
LSP	Sampatkumar. B. Muttalli	2,921	1.84%	New
Independent	Neelappa. M. Iter	2,205	1.39%	New
JD(S)	Dharmaraj M. Sali	1,885	1.18%	▼16.07
Independent	S. S. Kusagur	1,701	1.07%	New
Margin of victory		2,606	1.64%	▼2.03
Turnout		132,997	82.09%	▲6.92
Total valid votes		159,167		
Registered electors		162,020		▲6.71
KJP gain from INC		Swing	▲2.09	

=== Assembly Election 2008 ===
2008 Karnataka Legislative Assembly election : Hirekerur
Party	Candidate	Votes	%	±%
INC	B. C. Patil	35,322	30.97%	▲4.46
Independent	U. B. Banakar	31,132	27.29%	New
BJP	Ashok. K. Patil	21,632	18.97%	▼11.67
JD(S)	Bannikod Basappa Hanumantappa	19,678	17.25%	▼17.85
Independent	Ravi Tande Ramanna	2,197	1.93%	New
BSP	N. Y. Kalala	1,365	1.20%	New
SP	Angadi Shambulingappa Revanappa	1,104	0.97%	New
Independent	Pattanashetti Sateesh Rudrappa	870	0.76%	New
JD(U)	Ajjayyaswami Shadaksharayya Aradyamath	760	0.67%	New
Margin of victory		4,190	3.67%	▼0.79
Turnout		114,127	75.17%	▲0.83
Total valid votes		114,060		
Registered electors		151,833		▲0.96
INC gain from JD(S)		Swing	▼4.13	

=== Assembly Election 2004 ===
2004 Karnataka Legislative Assembly election : Hirekerur
Party	Candidate	Votes	%	±%
JD(S)	B. C. Patil	39,237	35.10%	▲33.84
BJP	Banakar Ujaneshwar Basavanappa	34,247	30.64%	▼0.76
INC	Bannikod Basappa Hanumantappa	29,630	26.51%	▲4.22
Independent	Jayanthi Rao	5,642	5.05%	New
JP	Dr. Ramanagouda. V. Y	1,574	1.41%	New
Kannada Nadu Party	Jokanal Maruti Basappa	1,460	1.31%	New
Margin of victory		4,990	4.46%	▲0.38
Turnout		111,804	74.34%	▼1.23
Total valid votes		111,790		
Registered electors		150,392		▲9.91
JD(S) gain from Independent		Swing	▼0.38	

=== Assembly Election 1999 ===
1999 Karnataka Legislative Assembly election : Hirekerur
Party	Candidate	Votes	%	±%
Independent	B. H. Bannikod	34,160	35.48%	New
BJP	U. B. Banakar	30,232	31.40%	▼4.23
INC	S. S. Patil	21,464	22.29%	▲7.66
Independent	D. M. Sali	6,894	7.16%	New
NCP	Ekkegondi Ramanagouda Veerappa	2,321	2.41%	New
JD(S)	Jagadeesh Basavanappa Tambakad	1,209	1.26%	New
Margin of victory		3,928	4.08%	▼6.30
Turnout		103,398	75.57%	▲4.32
Total valid votes		96,280		
Rejected ballots		7,113	6.88%	▲5.00
Registered electors		136,830		▲5.60
Independent gain from BJP		Swing	▼0.15	

=== Assembly Election 1994 ===
1994 Karnataka Legislative Assembly election : Hirekerur
Party	Candidate	Votes	%	±%
BJP	U. B. Banakar	32,248	35.63%	New
JD	B. H. Bannikod	22,855	25.25%	▼14.46
INC	A. A. Pathan	13,239	14.63%	▼21.42
INC	B. N. Banakar	10,584	11.69%	New
Kranti Sabha	S. S. Girimallappanavar	6,315	6.98%	New
Independent	Dr. Ramanagouda Yekkegondi	4,061	4.49%	New
Margin of victory		9,393	10.38%	▲6.73
Turnout		92,314	71.25%	▼2.92
Total valid votes		90,509		
Rejected ballots		1,733	1.88%	▼3.49
Registered electors		129,570		▲5.92
BJP gain from JD		Swing	▼4.08	

=== Assembly Election 1989 ===
1989 Karnataka Legislative Assembly election : Hirekerur
Party	Candidate	Votes	%	±%
JD	B. H. Bannikod	34,093	39.71%	New
INC	G. B. Shankar Rao	30,955	36.05%	▼8.20
Independent	D. M. Sali	18,940	22.06%	New
JP	M. H. Badaller	1,337	1.56%	New
Margin of victory		3,138	3.65%	▼4.32
Turnout		90,729	74.17%	▼2.56
Total valid votes		85,861		
Rejected ballots		4,868	5.37%	▲3.88
Registered electors		122,333		▲33.52
JD gain from JP		Swing	▼12.51	

=== Assembly Election 1985 ===
1985 Karnataka Legislative Assembly election : Hirekerur
Party	Candidate	Votes	%	±%
JP	U. B. Banakar	36,164	52.22%	▲47.66
INC	D. M. Sali	30,645	44.25%	▲0.61
Independent	Gurushantappa Basappa Jyoti	936	1.35%	New
Independent	Bilki Shekhappa Nagappa	689	0.99%	New
Independent	Kannappanavar Mallappa Shekharappa	467	0.67%	New
Margin of victory		5,519	7.97%	▲0.44
Turnout		70,297	76.73%	▲5.36
Total valid votes		69,250		
Rejected ballots		1,047	1.49%	▼0.22
Registered electors		91,622		▲1.93
JP gain from Independent		Swing	▲1.05	

=== Assembly Election 1983 ===
1983 Karnataka Legislative Assembly election : Hirekerur
Party	Candidate	Votes	%	±%
Independent	Bankar Basavannappa Gadlappa	32,268	51.17%	New
INC	Gubbi Shankarrao Basalingappagouda	27,517	43.64%	▲40.83
JP	Sali Basappa Mallappa	2,877	4.56%	▼0.49
Margin of victory		4,751	7.53%	▼6.31
Turnout		64,154	71.37%	▼5.55
Total valid votes		63,055		
Rejected ballots		1,099	1.71%	▼0.28
Registered electors		89,888		▲11.52
Independent hold		Swing	▼1.66	

=== Assembly Election 1978 ===
1978 Karnataka Legislative Assembly election : Hirekerur
Party	Candidate	Votes	%	±%
Independent	Gubbi Shankarrao Basalingappagouda	32,103	52.83%	New
INC(I)	Bankar Basavannappa Gadlappa	23,695	38.99%	New
JP	Shantanagoudra Mallikarjunagouda Channabasanagouda	3,069	5.05%	New
INC	Bannikod Basappa Hanumantappa	1,708	2.81%	▼50.34
Margin of victory		8,408	13.84%	▲6.91
Turnout		61,998	76.92%	▼0.83
Total valid votes		60,765		
Rejected ballots		1,233	1.99%	▲1.99
Registered electors		80,599		▲15.38
Independent gain from INC		Swing	▼0.32	

=== Assembly Election 1972 ===
1972 Mysore State Legislative Assembly election : Hirekerur
Party	Candidate	Votes	%	±%
INC	B. B. Gadlappa	28,205	53.15%	▼13.60
INC(O)	G. S. R. Basalingappagouda	24,529	46.22%	New
ABJS	H. S. Banashappa	333	0.63%	New
Margin of victory		3,676	6.93%	▼26.57
Turnout		54,314	77.75%	▲2.12
Total valid votes		53,067		
Registered electors		69,858		▲11.66
INC hold		Swing	▼13.60	

=== Assembly Election 1967 ===
1967 Mysore State Legislative Assembly election : Hirekerur
Party	Candidate	Votes	%	±%
INC	G. S. R. Basalingappagouda	30,368	66.75%	▲2.48
PSP	B. B. Gadlappa	15,126	33.25%	New
Margin of victory		15,242	33.50%	▲4.97
Turnout		47,317	75.63%	▲5.84
Total valid votes		45,494		
Registered electors		62,562		▲14.52
INC hold		Swing	▲2.48	

=== Assembly Election 1962 ===
1962 Mysore State Legislative Assembly election : Hirekerur
Party	Candidate	Votes	%	±%
INC	Gubbi Shankarrao Basalingappagouda	23,284	64.27%	▲4.34
SWA	Shiddanagouda Shivabasanagouda Karegoudar	12,946	35.73%	New
Margin of victory		10,338	28.53%	▲1.84
Turnout		38,124	69.79%	▲7.53
Total valid votes		36,230		
Registered electors		54,628		▲12.40
INC hold		Swing	▲4.34	

=== Assembly Election 1957 ===
1957 Mysore State Legislative Assembly election : Hirekerur
Party	Candidate	Votes	%	±%
INC	Gubbi Shankarrao Basalingappagouda	18,137	59.93%	▲6.60
Independent	Patil Basalingappagouda Dodgouda	10,060	33.24%	New
Independent	Newsi Basavannappa Somappa	2,065	6.82%	New
Margin of victory		8,077	26.69%	▲13.80
Turnout		30,262	62.26%	▼2.58
Total valid votes		30,262		
Registered electors		48,602		▼8.27
INC hold		Swing	▲6.60	

=== Assembly Election 1952 ===
1952 Bombay State Legislative Assembly election : Hirekerur
Party	Candidate	Votes	%	±%
INC	Veeranagouda Veerbasagouda Patil	18,323	53.33%	New
KMPP	Basalengappagouda Doddagouda Patil	13,893	40.44%	New
Socialist Party (India)	Malleshappa Malkappa Banakar	2,139	6.23%	New
Margin of victory		4,430	12.89%	
Turnout		34,355	64.84%	
Total valid votes		34,355		
Registered electors		52,985		
INC win (new seat)				

== See also ==
- List of constituencies of the Karnataka Legislative Assembly
- Haveri district
