= Curfew (1994 film) =

1994 Kannada crime film by Ha Su Rajasekhar

- Title card of the film
- Directed by: Ha Su Rajasekhar
- Written by: Richard Louis (Dialogues)
- Screenplay by: Ha Su Rajasekhar
- Story by: L. R. Ranganath Rao
- Produced by: D. K. Ramakrishna; N. Chinnarajan
- Starring: Devaraj; B. C. Patil; Doddanna; Dattatreya
- Cinematography: Ashok Kashyap
- Edited by: Suresh Urs
- Music by: Sadhu Kokila
- Production company: Sri Sai Jyothi Creations
- Release date: 1994
- Running time: 139 minutes
- Country: India
- Language: Kannada

Curfew is a 1994 Indian Kannada crime film starring Devaraj, B. C. Patil, Doddanna, Dattatreya and Richard Louis in the lead roles with Sudharani in an extended cameo appearance. Directed by Ha Su Rajasekhar, the film produced under Sri Sai Jyothi Creations had background score by Sadhu Kokila. Rajasekhar also wrote the screenplay for the story by L. R. Ranganath Rao.

Unlike the usual commercial films produced in India during the 1980s and 1990s, Curfew did not have any songs, humorous fillers or serious romantic subplots.

== Plot ==
The film begins in Udayapura, Bengaluru the same constituency from which an honest politician Sujjan Rao contested for the M. L. A. post eventually becoming the people's favourite Chief Minister. He is secretly disdained by former Home Minister, Palaksha, and his sidekick Venkatesha "Venka". They secretly support an extortion gang after their leader, Dalapathy, is jailed for murder. After receiving enough complaints from the natives of Udayapura regarding the police's ineffectiveness, Sujjan transfers Pradeep to the area as the new Deputy Commissioner. Pradeep was earlier posted as the Circle Inspector in the regional police station until he was trapped in a custodial murder case by Palaksha and got a punishment transfer. The arrival of Pradeep becomes a permanent roadblock for Palaksha's malicious plans and hence decides to seek the help of Dalapathy who owes his jailtime to both Pradeep and Sujjan.

Meanwhile, the people of Udayapura and Shantipura calls for a bandh after the government fails to take the right steps against alcohol production in the state and asks Sujjan's tutor and freedom fighter Narayan to lead them. Dalapathy who is hospitalised in a hospital in Mysuru orders his henchmen to manipulate two jobless youngsters, Subbu and Seenu, to help them turn the peaceful bandh into a violent one. Though they just trigger the events, the other goons terrorise the people by destroying shops and murder. Even Narayan is killed. Though Pradeep arrests the rowdies they manage to escape. Dalapathy who escapes to Bangalore allies with Palaksha and continues to terrorise the people forcing Pradeep to call for a 24-hour curfew in Udayapura and Shantipura.

The next day when the curfew is relieved for two hours for the people to purchase the necessary groceries they are attacked by Dalapathy's goons forcing Pradeep to call for a more rigorous curfew in addition to which a shoot at sight order is issued. To make matters worse Dalapathy bombs the pipeline supplying water to the areas and pits the people dwelling in the slums against police. He also kills an innocent man and makes it look like the police did it. Subbu and Seenu, deeply regretting their actions try to help a sick baby when Subbu gets gunned down by the police. Pradeep, meanwhile, catches the goons from their secret hideout in Udayapura. Later with the help of a journalist, Srinivas, who secretly captured photos of the criminals during the riots Pradeep learns that Dalapathy has escaped from the Mysore prison and travels to Mysuru. There he learns from the doctor, Murthy, who treated Dalapathy about how the latter's henchman beat up the doctor's wife for refusing to admit him in the hospital eventually threatening him to help Dalapathy escape. Pradeep with the help of Murthy and Srinivas turns Dalapathy against Palaksha and Venka. After killing them he escapes with a sniper rifle so as to kill Sujjan who has organised a padhayatra. At the end Pradeep saves Sujjan and kills Dalapathy. Sujjan, afterwards, gives a speech on how the people should respect and support the police force. The people of Udayapura, once again, lead a happy life.

== Cast ==
- Devaraj as DCP Pradeep
- B. C. Patil as Dalapathi
- Doddanna as Palaksha
- Richard Louis as Venkatesha
- Datthatreya as Chief Minister Sajjan Rao
- G. K. Govinda Rao as Narayan
- Bank Janardhan as Bhatt
- Sanketh Kashi as Subbu
- Shanthamma as Basanni's mother
- Sudharani as Sudha (extended cameo)

== Crew ==
1. D. K. Ramakrishna, N. Chinnarajan : Producer
2. Ha Su Rajasekhar : Screenplay, Direction
3. L. R. Ranganath Rao : Story
4. Richard Louis : Dialogues
5. Sadhu Kokila : Music
6. Ashok Kashyap : Cinematography
7. Suresh Urs : Editor
8. Suresh : Stunts

== Release ==
The film received a U Certificate from the Censor Board's regional office at Bengaluru with the certificate dated 27 October 1994. The film was a Blockbuster at the box office.
