= Natchatra Kadhal =

Indian Tamil-language romantic drama film

- Directed by: Nayakam
- Written by: Nayakam
- Produced by: Kannama; Vedha
- Starring: Ajay Kapoor; Bhavana
- Cinematography: Ashok Naidu
- Music by: Rajesh Ramanath
- Production company: NRI Films International
- Release date: 30 March 2001
- Country: India
- Language: Tamil

Natchatra Kadhal (transl. Star Love) is a 2001 Indian Tamil-language romantic drama film written and directed by Nayakam. The film stars Ajay Kapoor and Bhavana. It was released on 30 March 2001.

== Plot ==
Wealthy upper-class Malini (Bhavana) falls in love with the good-natured car-mechanic Shekhar (Ajay), who is an orphan. Despite their fondness of Shekhar's good character, Malini's parents opt to give her an arranged marriage to a groom better suited to their status, using horoscopes, and finalise Ashok (Pathy). Malini agrees to her parents' decision, but takes a trip to Bangalore with Shekhar, where they stay together. Despite Shekhar's advances, Malini opts against becoming physically involved with Shekhar, much to his annoyance.

Malini later gets married Ashok, who is infected with HIV/AIDS. Shekhar later returns to assist Ashok during his sat at the hospital. Unable to bear the pain, Ashok later pulls out the life-support machine himself. Malini and Shekhar then reunite.

== Cast ==
- Ajay Kapoor as Shekhar
- Bhavana as Malini
- Subhalakshmi
- Ashok Rao
- Pathy as Ashok
- Jayaraman

== Production ==
Nayakam, a NRI and alumni of the film institute of UCLA and University of Southern California, chose to make the film to spread the message of blind beliefs on horoscope and convey that HIV/AIDS was curable. The film starred Ajay Kapoor, who had previously played the antagonist in Anwar's Ooty (1999) in the lead role. He was cast alongside Kannada actress Bhavana.

== Release and reception ==
The film was released on 30 March 2001, alongside Rajakumaran's Vinnukum Mannukum (2001). A reviewer from The Hindu wrote "the director has not concentrated on anything nor does he have the power to take the film on his shoulders to make it interesting" and "the screenplay has nothing to offer and the scenes are not up to the mark".

A critic from ChennaiOnline.com gave the film a negative review stating it is a "film that neither satisfies one aesthetically nor entertains", adding "the intention seems to be to make a film that is different from the run-of-the-mill Tamil films - and also not to go too far away from the usual formula". IndiaInfo.com noted it was a "film with a message" but stated "the director falters in his story telling by sermonizing at length and the cameraman gives so many bad shots." A reviewer from Screen noted "he director falters in his storytelling by sermonising at length and Ashok Naidu, the cameraman, gives too many bad shots."

The producers took the film to the NFDC Film Bazaar at the Cannes Film Festival, and also dubbed the film in Hindi. Nayakam later announced another project titled Pennmaiyum Niyamum, on the story of a woman who sacrifices her marital life to save her unborn child, but the film was not released.
