= Nivedhitha =

Indian actress

Niveditha
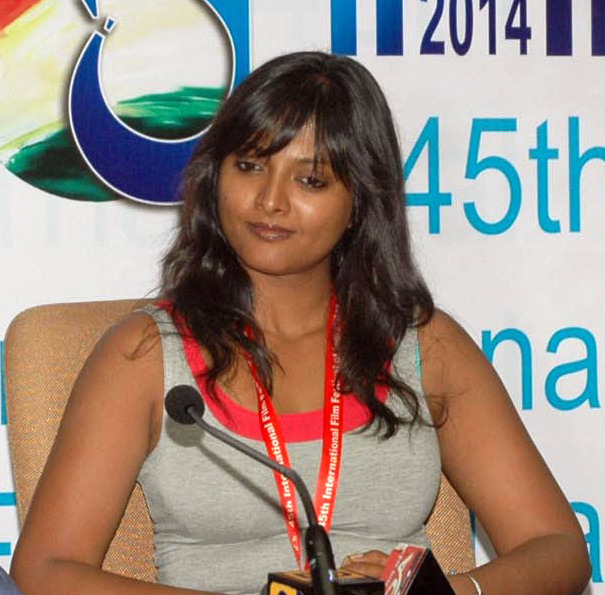
- Niveditha, IFFI (2014)
- Born: Smitha Jagadish; Karnataka, India
- Other names: Niveditha, Smitha
- Occupations: actress, model

Niveditha, formerly known and credited as Smitha, is an Indian actress, who predominantly appears in Kannada films. She attracted notable attention with her performance in the film Avva (2008) that fetched her the Karnataka State Film Award for Best Supporting Actress.

== Early life ==
Her father Jagadish worked as a deputy commissioner of commercial taxes, her mother Lakshmi is a housewife. She did her schooling in Chikmagalur; later she studied at the Marimallappa High School and completed her PUC at the Marimallappa Pre-University College in Mysore, both part of Marimallappa's Educational Institutions. As a student, Smitha, who described herself as a tomboy, was also an NCC cadet. After graduating as an engineering student from the CMRIT College, Bangalore, she went on to work at the software company Infosys for a year. She quit the job to pursue an acting career; when she was offered a role, she first joined actor Anupam Kher's acting school, Actor Prepares and took a crash course.

== Career ==
Smitha was first signed on for a role in the film Akasha Gange by Dinesh Baboo, however as the film got delayed, several films she had signed later, including Kallarali Hoovagi, Sixer, Mathad Mathadu Mallige and Avva released before. Among her early releases, the Kavita Lankesh-directed Avva remains her most notable. The film particularly made headlines for a kissing scene featuring her and her co-star Duniya Vijay. Her performance in the film earned her the Karnataka State Film Award for Best Supporting Actress. Although completed in July 2006, Akasha Gange released only in July 2008 and eventually became her sixth release. As she got no offers in Kannada cinema subsequently, she moved on to work in the Tamil film industry. Porkkalam directed by newcomer Bandi Sarojkumar was her first Tamil film, which was panned by critics upon release.

Smitha then changed her screen name to Niveditha, according to numerology as advised by her well-wishers, when she did not receive the offers she was looking for. The first release after her name change was her second Tamil film Kathai (2010). During the period, she had reportedly secured a lead role in National Film Award-winning director Bala's Avan Ivan; however the character was eventually portrayed by Madhu Shalini. 9 To 12 (2011) starring Kishore who she previously had co-starred with in Porkkalam, became her first release in Kannada after Akasha Gange in 2008; it opened to negative reception. Her first release in 2012 saw her enacting the title role, a Lambani girl, in Parie, based on the award-winning Kannada novel Bharadwaj. Her next release was Kiladi Kitty alongside Srinagar Kitty and Haripriya, with Niveditha lamenting after the release that her role had been cut short. Her upcoming films include Nimbe Huli, Gowri Putra and the long-delayed Dheena.

== Filmography ==
Year	Film	Role	Language	Notes
2006	Kallarali Hoovagi	Gangi	Kannada	Credited as Smitha
2007	Sixer		Kannada	Credited as Smitha
2007	Maathaad Maathaadu Mallige	Mallika	Kannada	Credited as Smitha
2008	Avva	Savanthri	Kannada	Credited as Smitha; Karnataka State Film Award for Best Supporting Actress
2008	Athmeeya	Anupama	Kannada	Credited as Smitha
2008	Akasha Gange		Kannada	Credited as Smitha
2010	Porkkalam	Sneha	Tamil	Credited as Smitha
2010	Kathai	Kavya	Tamil	
2011	9 to 12		Kannada	
2011	Markandeyan	Ilavanchi	Tamil	
2012	Parie	Parie	Kannada	
2012	Kiladi Kitty	Mandakini	Kannada	
2012	Gandhi Smiles		Kannada	
2012	Yaare Koogadali		Kannada	
2014	Nimbehuli	Seetha	Kannada	
2014	December-1	Devakka	Kannada	Karnataka State Film Award for Best Actress
2014	Gowri Putra	Bharathi	Kannada	
2014	Dheena		Kannada	
2017	Shuddhi	Jyothi	Kannada	Nominated - Filmfare Award for Best Actress - Kannada; Nominated - SIIMA Award for Best Actor in a Leading Role (Female) - Kannada
2019	Chithiram Pesuthadi 2	Dhanalakshmi	Tamil	
2020	Popcorn Monkey Tiger	Devika aka "Popcorn" Devi	Kannada	
