= Shaapa =

2000 film by Ashok Patil

- Directed by: Ashok Patil
- Screenplay by: Ashok Patil
- Story by: Hamsalekha
- Produced by: B. C. Patil; Vanaja Patil
- Starring: B. C. Patil; Ramesh Aravind; Anu Prabhakar
- Cinematography: Ashok Kashyap
- Edited by: S. Manohar
- Music by: Hamsalekha
- Release date: 4 May 2001
- Running time: 150 minutes
- Country: India
- Language: Kannada

Shaapa (Kannada: ಶಾಪ, Curse) is 2001 Indian Kannada-language romantic drama film directed by Ashok Patil starring B. C. Patil, Ramesh Aravind and Anu Prabhakar with K. S. Ashwath and Avinash in supporting roles. The film is about a man who is unable to come to terms with the marriage of his childhood sweetheart. Despite releasing to positive reviews, the film was a box office failure.

== Plot ==
Shaapa is a poignant story of a man (Ramesh Aravind as Shekhar) emotionally abused during his childhood by his father and how he struggles to fight his inner demons throughout his adult life. The story is juxtaposed on the backdrop of the Cauvery river water dispute between the states of Karnataka and Tamil Nadu.

Ramesh plays Shekhar, a man afflicted by his childhood memories of being emotionally abused by his father (played by Jai Jagdish). Often during his childhood, Shekhar was pointed out to be the reason for anything that went wrong with their family. Years after his father's death, he continues to hear his father's voice in his head that keeps telling him that he's useless and that he'd never achieve anything in his life and that he'd be a failure. To add to it, the memories of his step-mother (whom he is shown to love a lot but who dies) keep telling him that whatever he tries to beget in life, will be lost.

Shekhar is shown to free sheep from the butcher's each day by paying for the sheep, so it can remain alive, much to the amusement of the butcher.

Enter Kaveri (Anu Prabhakar), a doctor who believes in working for social causes like widow remarriage. They get on very well. She also teaches him to play the flute (which he was keen to learn in his childhood but was discouraged by his father). He also takes her to his widowed sister so Kaveri can convince her to remarry someone. Over the entire period of their acquaintance, Shekhar can never bring himself to let Kaveri know that he's in love with her for the fear that he might lose her just as he lost his beloved step-mother.

At one point, Kaveri has to leave for Bengaluru and she shares her feelings in a letter that she gives him. The packet also contains a flute which Ramesh notices, but he doesn't notice the letter.

The "father's voice in the head" begins to haunt him even more and he decides to consult a psychiatrist (played by Avinash), who offers him advice on how to overcome his situation. Four years later, he meets Kaveri again and much to his pleasant surprise he gets to know that she's still unmarried. He invites her to his place for dinner on a Diwali night. Kaveri is welcomed by Shekhar and the cook (played by K S Ashwath). After dinner, Shekhar proposes marriage to her in a creative way, only to realize that she's engaged to Ravi, a mechanical engineer from Chennai (played by B C Patil). Shekhar gets to know that Kaveri loved him too and gets to know about the letter that he missed. As Kaveri prepares to leave, Ravi comes to pick her up. The intended metaphor of two people (Ravi from Chennai and Shekhar from Karnataka) fighting for Kaveri and the Cauvery water dispute between the two states becomes more and more apparent from this point.

Shekhar is also in a bit of financial trouble because of dropping coffee prices (he owns a coffee export firm) and his bankers are keen to be repaid by him for the loan he obtained.

Kaveri marries Ravi, only to realize that he's only interested in money and doesn't really love her. He also tries to wean her away from her social services and persuades her to move to London with him so she can have a lucrative medical career there which she doesn't agree to initially. But subsequently she bows to his pressure and leaves for Chennai to get her visa. On the way she meets Shekhar and tells him of her and Ravi's plans. Shekhar's determined not to lose her (he loves her and has to convince himself that he's not a loser). He abandons his errand midway and rushes back to his place with a plan to kill Ravi, buys a revolver and hides in a cupboard at Ravi's home trying to shoot him. Caught between conflicting ideologies ("it's ok to kill if the reason is your survival" and "one should never harm anyone"), he manages to flee Ravi's place in the nick of time managing to evade Ravi's rifle.

He loses his company and all his property to the bank when his coffee godown is flooded by the river.

Shekhar is still determined not to let go of Kaveri (which is shown through a group of people protesting against the release of Cauvery water to Tamil Nadu). He takes the butcher's help (who is shown to have been an aide of an underworld don a few years ago) to kill Ravi and asks him not to leave behind any clue. The butcher is amused to see the change in ideology in Shekhar (he asks him "Why should I kill him?" to which Shekhar says "I have to live").

The butcher plants nails beneath the jeep at Ravi's house and enters to kill him. Meanwhile, Kaveri has got the visa, but she decides that going to London is something that she'd rather not do. She goes to Shekhar's place and tells him of her plan. She says that she'll head back to her home and tell Ravi all about it. Shekhar tells her not to go to her home that night (knowing that the butcher is out to kill Ravi that night). She doesn't heed him.

At Ravi's place, there is a scuffle between the butcher and Ravi. Ravi is killed and as the butcher is making his getaway, he's caught at the doorstep by Kaveri, whom the butcher promptly shoots down. At that moment Shekhar enters, aghast that Kaveri is dying, shoots the butcher down and tries to rush her to a hospital. With the punctured wheels on the vehicle, he's not able to and she dies en route.

The last scene shows him spending 14 years in jail for murder. Upon release he is shown jumping into the Cauvery river to commit suicide, and a symbolic unision with Kaveri is shown.

== Cast ==
- B. C. Patil as Ravi
- Ramesh Aravind as Shekhar
- Anu Prabhakar as Kaveri
- K. S. Ashwath as Cook
- Jai Jagadish
- Avinash as Psychiatrist
- Negro Johnny
- Jayalakshmi
- Shailaja Joshi

== Production ==
B. C. Patil's brother, Ashok Patil, made his directorial debut with this film. He worked as a software engineer in Motorola before moving to Hollywood to pursue a career in films. Unlike many Indian films at the time, the dialogues were recorded when the film was shot instead of at a later time in a studio. B. C. Patil borrowed money to make this film.

== Soundtrack ==
Shaapa

Soundtrack album by Hamsalekha
- Released: 2000
- Genre: Film Soundtrack

The music is scored by Hamsalekha.

Song title	Singers	Lyrics	Description
"Ee Nadiyali"	Rajesh Krishnan, K. S. Chithra	Hamsalekha	
"Kaveravva Kaveravva Neenu Hutti"	Hemanth Kumar, Nanditha, Sujatha	Hamsalekha	
"Le Le Marula Marula"	Hemanth Kumar	Hamsalekha	
"Manase Manase O Manase"	Hemanth Kumar	Hamsalekha	
"Vaahini Vaahini Premada Vaahini"	Hemanth Kumar, Anuradha Sriram	Hamsalekha	

== Reception ==
A critic from Sify wrote that "It is an out and out Ramesh Aravind movie, which has been deftly directed by Ashok Patil. Anu Prabhakar as Kaveri shows that she can emote. But the highlight of the film is the fast moving camera work of Ashok Kashyap. Hamsalekha’s music is melodious. Shappa is a tout suspense thriller". A critic from indiainfo.com rated the film three out of five stars and wrote that "Ashok Patil's maiden venture has many factors to make his Shaapa a blessing. His Hollywood learning and technology expertise has blended well with our sandal wood story. That doesn't mean we can treat it light. It is a psychic story that usually ends-up educative, has an entertainment value in it".

Writing for The Times of India in 2021, Swaroop Kodur wrote that "Embodying the Tom Ripley character shades in the film, Ramesh Aravind played the part to perfection, and along with Anu Prabhakar's lucidness and easy charm, Shaapa turned out to be an exciting - but tragic - romantic thriller that still stands the test of time".

== Awards ==
2000–01 Karnataka State Film Awards

- Best Screenplay - Ashok Patil
- Best Actress - Anu Prabhakar
- Best Cinematographer - Ashok Kashyap
- Second Best Film - Ashok Patil

Cinema Express Awards

- Best Actress - Anu Prabhakar
