= Lankesha =

Indian drama film

- Directed by: B. C. Patil
- Written by: B. C. Patil (dialogue)
- Screenplay by: B. C. Patil
- Story by: B. A. Madhu
- Produced by: Vanaja B Patil; Channabasavanagowda Patil
- Starring: B. C. Patil; Bhavana; Sheetal Bedi
- Cinematography: Ashok Kashyap
- Edited by: Shashikumar
- Music by: Hamsalekha
- Production company: Srushti Films
- Release date: 23 January 2001
- Country: India
- Language: Kannada

Lankesha is a 2001 Indian Kannada-language drama film directed by B. C. Patil and starring himself, Bhavana and Sheetal Bedi. The film was released to mixed reviews.

== Cast ==
- B. C. Patil as Lankesha
- Bhavana
- Sheetal Bedi as Janaki
- Shobaraj
- Rami Reddy
- Shivaram
- Avinash
- Rathnakar
- Srikanta
- Shashi Kumar
- Baby Srushti
- Shailaja Joshi

== Production ==
Bhavana shot for this film alongside Ellara Mane Dosenu (2001), Kurigalu Saar Kurigalu (2001), and Rashtrageethe (2001). She plays a sacrificial character. Mumbai based-Sheetal Bedi made her Kannada debut through this film.

== Soundtrack ==
The music was composed by Hamsalekha, who also wrote the lyrics.

- "Jinchakka Jinchakka" - Hemanth, Anuradha Sriram
- "Mahesha Papa Vinasha (Title Song)" - Hemanth
- "Kennege Hyange Banthu Kempu" - Hemanth
- "Mere Samane Wale" - Hemanth
- "Ranne Oh Ranne" - Hemanth
- "Bandaga Obbane Bande" - Manu

== Reception ==
A critic from Chitraloka.com called the film liked by everyone including Ravana and Rama. A critic from indiainfo.com rated the film two out of five and wrote that "Just when we feel a little too tired with all the violence in the film, sentiments breeze in excess. There are only two emotions one can feel for this film, you can either like it or hate it".
