= Gowri Putra =

- Directed by: Manjunath M Maskal Matty
- Produced by: H Soumyashree
- Starring: Akshay; Nikita Thukral; Nivedhitha
- Cinematography: P L Ravi
- Edited by: Kiran
- Music by: Milind Dharmasen
- Release date: 27 July 2012
- Country: India
- Language: Kannada

Gowri Putra (Kannada: ಗೌರಿ ಪುತ್ರ) is a 2012 Indian Kannada-language film directed by Manjunath M Maskal Matty, starring Akshay, Nikita Thukral and Nivedhitha in lead roles. It is a remake of 2008 Tamil film Raman Thediya Seethai.

== Cast ==
- Akshay as Ganesha
- Nikita Thukral as Ranjitha
- Nivedhitha as Bharathi
- Nagashekar
- Rakesh Sharma
- Roopika as Nandhini
- Manasi as Jayanthi
- Soumya Sankalpa
- Ramesh Bhat
- Sihikahi Geetha

== Music ==
Gowri Puthra

Soundtrack album by Milind Dharmasen
- Released: 2012
- Recorded: 2012
- Genre: Feature film soundtrack
- Length: 10:54
- Language: Kannada

Official audio
- Gowri Puthra - Full Album on YouTube

Track listing
No.	Title	Singer(s)	Length
1.	"Yarigo Yarano Seriso Premave"	Nagashekar, Archana Ayer	4:15
2.	"Deva Dasa Daya Madi"	Koushik Harsha	2:05
3.	"Moda Modalu Nanna Edeya Olage"	Meghana Kulakarni	4:34
Total length:			10:54

== Reception ==
=== Critical response ===
B S Srivani from Deccan Herald scored the film at 3 out of 5 stars and says "Editing goes haywire, so does the lighting and camera shots before semblance of order is restored. Milind Dharmasen comes up with two decent numbers. A nice title, ‘Gowri Putra’ lacks that something to make it last". A critic from News18 India wrote " 'Gowri Putra' is an average affair. Though it is a family-oriented story, it has been presented badly". A critic from NDTV wrote "Akshay has done a good job in the role of Ganesh, but it is Nagashekhar, who scores in the role of Shekhar Nag. The film also scores in its technical values". A critic from The Times of India scored the film at 3 out of 5 stars and wrote "While Akshay has shown maturity, Nagashekar has done a wonderful job. Nikhitha’s role has been spoilt by poor dubbing. Niveditha is lively and Roopika is bubbly. Music by Milind Dharmasena has some catchy tunes. Cinematography by PL Ravee is impressive". A critic from Pinkvilla wrote "With two melodious tunes composed by Milind Dharmasena and neat picturisations, the film comes alive from its dragging narration".
