= Deveeri =

- Directed by: Kavitha Lankesh
- Written by: Kavitha Lankesh
- Screenplay by: Kavitha Lankesh
- Story by: P. Lankesh
- Based on: Akka by P. Lankesh
- Produced by: Bharathi Gowda, Hanumantha Reddy, Kavitha Lankesh
- Starring: Nandita Das; Manjunath
- Cinematography: S. Ramachandra
- Edited by: M. N. Swamy
- Production company: Navajeevana Films
- Release date: 1999 (Bangalore)
- Running time: 105 minutes
- Country: India
- Language: Kannada

Deveeri is a 1999 Kannada language film based on the novel Akka by noted Kannada writer P. Lankesh. The novel was adapted for the film by his daughter Kavitha Lankesh.

The film won the 1999–2000 Karnataka State Award for best film.

== Plot ==
The central storyline revolves around a young girl, Deveeri, who has lost her parents and struggles to care for her younger brother. She becomes prey to exploitation by others.

== Cast ==
- Nandita Das as Deveeri
- Manjunath as Krishna "Kyaatha"
- Bhavana as Paddi
- Sanketh Kashi as Rangappa
- B. Jayashree as Rangappa's wife
- Deesh Mariwala as Nagara

== Production ==
Manjunath is from the NGO BOSCO.

== Reception ==
S. Viswanath of Deccan Herald felt that the film lacked a "taut script" and added, "Besides this, there are tacky numbers, with scenes that rarely justify a genre film." He further wrote, "Popular elements have been accommodated into the scheme of things to pander suit to the puerile tastes of to rake in the moolah, with the result the film is stretched a wee long, while, a more aesthetic screenplay would have taken the film to newer realms of novella vogue cinema." However, he commended the film's background score and wrote, "Music director V Manohar lends ample support to Kavitha with excellent, ear-catching background score, enhancing the melancholic mood to the touching tale." While he praised Manjunath's performance in the film in that he had the "maturity of seasoned player, amply justifying Kavitha's faith in the promising lad's abilities", the performance of Nandita Das seemed "unconvincing" to him. He felt that she failed to "add lustre to the film, and her effort comes as a damp-squib." Also writing for Deccan Herald, Aravind Gowda called the film "an exceptionally well-made movie". He felt, "The screenplay, the characters and the story-line, all go well together into making Deveeri a good film to watch." He concluded writing praises of all leading performances in the film. A critic from Sify wrote, "Kavitha Lankesh, daughter of the illustrious writer cum journalist, in her maiden directorial venture has proved herself to be a chip of the old block and shows a great deal of promise".
