= Kiladi Kitty =

- Directed by: Anantha Raju
- Produced by: S. V. Shivakumar
- Starring: Srinagar Kitty; Haripriya; Nivedhitha
- Cinematography: Ravi Kumar Sana
- Music by: Jassie Gift
- Production company: Sangama Films
- Release date: 18 May 2012
- Country: India
- Language: Kannada

Kiladi Kitty (Kannada: ಕಿಲಾಡಿ ಕಿಟ್ಟಿ) is a 2012 Kannada comedy film directed by Anantha Raju and produced by Shivakumar under Sangama Films banner. It stars Srinagar Kitty and Haripriya in the lead roles while Nivedhitha makes a special appearance. Jassie Gift is the music director and Krishna Kumar is the cinematographer of the film.

The film is a remake of 2008 Telugu film Blade Babji starring Allari Naresh and Sayali Bhagat in the lead roles, which itself was a remake of Hollywood movie Blue Streak.

== Plot ==
Kitty is a pickpocket who takes up the mission of earning 4 crores to rescue the slum dwellers in his area from a builder. He and his gang rob a bank. And they hide the loot in a building under construction. However, by accident they land on a boat to the Andaman Islands which forces them to go away for a month. When they return, they find a police control room at the spot where they hidden their loot. The rest of the story is all about the comedy of errors that follow.

== Cast ==
- Srinagar Kitty as Kitty
- Haripriya
- Nivedhitha as Mandakini
- Rangayana Raghu
- Sangeeta
- Sharan as Dubai Babu
- Anand
- Dileep Raj
- Dayanand as Gunda
- Mukhyamantri Chandru
- Sathyajith

== Soundtrack ==
Kiladi Kitty

Soundtrack album by Jassie Gift
- Released: 2012
- Recorded: 2012
- Genre: Feature film soundtrack
- Length: 24:26
- Language: Kannada

Official audio
- Kiladi Kitty - Full Album on YouTube

The music was composed by Jassie Gift. It was released by Jamaican cricketer Chris Gayle.

No.	Title	Lyrics	Singer(s)	Length
1.	"Kaanji Peenji Haadu"	Yogaraj Bhat	Jassie Gift, Chetan Sosca	4:12
2.	"Thumba Thumba"	Jayanth Kaikini	Sonu Nigam, Sunitha Upadrashta	4:20
3.	"Madhura Huchchu (Duet Version)"	Yogaraj Bhat	Tippu, Shreya Ghoshal	4:07
4.	"Naave Maharajaru"	V. Srikanth	Shankar Mahadevan	3:46
5.	"Kaanji Peenji Haadu Remix"	Yogaraj Bhat	Jassie Gift, Chetan Sosca	4:34
6.	"Madhura Huchchu (Female Version)"	Yogaraj Bhat	Shreya Ghoshal	4:07
Total length:				24:26

== Reception ==
=== Critical response ===
A critic from The Times of India scored the film at 3.5 out of 5 stars and says "Haripriya is amazing with her beauty and expressions. Nivedita impresses you with her charming looks. Rangayana Raghu, Sharan and Dilip Raj keep you entertained throughout. Jessie Gift has a couple of foot-tapping numbers for you. Cinematography by Ravikumar Sana is okay". A critic from News18 India wrote "Jessie Gift, though not at his best, has been able to provide good tunes for two songs. Ravi Kumar Sana, the cinematographer, showcases his talent again through this film. 'Kiladi Kitty' has some shortcomings, but is worth a one-time watch". Y Maheswara Reddy from DNA wrote "Even the heroines, Haripriya and Smitha play their parts out quite well. Cinematographer Ravikumar Sanara has done a neat job behind the camera with Jassy Gift providing some lilting music". A critic from Bangalore Mirror wrote "Despite the flaws, that can fill the page, Kiladi Kitty is the cliched time-pass. You will enjoy it for what it is. Even if you won’t ROFLOL, the flick will make you LOL in some places. Talk about small mercies".
