= Preethi Prema Pranaya =

- DVD cover
- Directed by: Kavitha Lankesh
- Written by: Kavitha Lankesh
- Produced by: Mano Murthy; Ram Prasad; Dr. Renuka Ramappa; Somashekhar
- Starring: Anant Nag; Bharathi Vishnuvardhan; Anu Prabhakar
- Cinematography: A. C. Mahendran
- Edited by: M. N. Swamy
- Music by: Mano Murthy
- Production company: Indo-Hollywood Films
- Release date: 1 August 2003
- Running time: 124 minutes
- Country: India
- Language: Kannada

Preethi Prema Pranaya (transl. Love, love, love) is a 2003 Indian Kannada-language drama film written and directed by Kavitha Lankesh. The film features an ensemble cast of Anant Nag, Bharathi Vishnuvardhan, Sudharani, Prakash Raj, Bhavana, Anu Prabhakar and Sunil Raoh. It was produced by "Indo - Hollywood" films, consisting of five producers, namely Mano Murthy, Ram Prasad, Dr. Renuka and Somashekar. The music was composed by Mano Murthy. The film went on to become a musical hit and won many awards including the National Film Award for Best Feature Film in Kannada.

The movie was also an inspiration for 2005 Hindi movie Pyaar Mein Twist.

== Cast ==
- Ananth Nag as Dr. Chandrashekhar
- Prakash Raj as Dr. Ashok
- Bharathi Vishnuvardhan as Sharada Devi
- Sudharani as Jyothi
- Bhavana as Sheela
- Sunil Raoh as Vivek
- Anu Prabhakar as Kavya
- Sampath Raj as Prasad
- Arun Sagar as Dr Ajay
- Loknath as Badrinath
- Shivaram as Srinivas

== Production ==
Filming for Preethi Prema Pranaya began in January 2003. The film was produced jointly by four NRIs: composer Mano Murthy, singer Ramprasad, Somashekar and Dr Renuka Ramappa under the banner of Indo-Hollywood Creations. Director Kavitha Lankesh stated that the film would present the idea that "love is ageless". She added that, "Having a partner in the old age is not new in the US. This is logically justified as the dear ones including sons and daughters keep away from their own parents. The elders feel left in the lurch especially when they live in far off places without anyone looking after them".

== Soundtrack ==
- "Manase Manase" - Suresh Peters, Archana Udupa
- "Ellidde Illi Thanka" - K. S. Chitra, Ram Prasad
- "Kabbina Jalle" - B. Jayashree, Ram Prasad
- "Chapala Chapala" - Ram Prasad, Sham
- "Ondu Maath Keltheeni" - Nanditha, Ram Prasad
- "Preethi Prema Pranaya" - Archana Udupa, Nanditha, Pallavi

== Reception ==
A critic from Chitraloka.com wrote, "PPP – Preethi Prema Pranaya – is Parabolic, Paragon, Pedestal, Pellucid, Pensive and Perceptible. When a director is armed with top artistes the work might be as easy as lifting a ‘bouquet’ but making it interesting is the area where Kavitha wins millions of hearts".

== Awards ==
51st National Film Awards

- Best Feature Film in Kannada

2003–04 Karnataka State Film Awards

- Best Screenplay – Kavitha Lankesh
- Best Lyrics - K. Kalyan

South Cine Fans Awards

- Best Music Director – Mano Murthy

Chennai Film Fans Association Awards

- Best Film
- Best Music Direction – Mano Murthy
- Best Supporting Artiste – Anant Nag
