= Hrudayavantha =

- Directed by: P. Vasu
- Written by: P. Vasu
- Produced by: K. Manju
- Starring: Vishnuvardhan; Nagma; Anu Prabhakar
- Cinematography: Ramesh Babu
- Edited by: P. R. Soundar Raj
- Music by: Hamsalekha
- Production company: Lakshmishree Combines
- Release date: 2 October 2003
- Running time: 155 minutes
- Country: India
- Language: Kannada

Hrudayavantha (transl. Kindhearted person) is a 2003 Indian Kannada-language drama film directed and written by P. Vasu and produced by K. Manju. The film stars Vishnuvardhan, Nagma and Anu Prabhakar. The film met with average reviews upon release. The soundtrack and score was composed by Hamsalekha.

== Cast ==
- Vishnuvardhan as Shivaswamy
- Nagma
- Ashalatha
- Anu Prabhakar as Gouthami
- Pragathi
- Shivaram
- Doddanna
- Ramesh Bhat
- Shobharaj
- Rangayana Raghu
- Mandya Ramesh
- Renuka Prasad
- Sundar Raj
- Ayyappa P. Sharma
- Giri Dwarakish
- Vaijanath Biradar (uncredited)
- R. G. Vijayasarathy as Vishwanath (uncredited)

== Soundtrack ==
Hrudayavantha

Soundtrack album by Hamsalekha
- Released: 2003
- Genre: Feature film soundtrack
- Label: Jhankar Music

Singles from Hrudayavantha
- 1. "Anna Needore"; 2. "Thangiye Thangiye"

Hamsalekha composed the film's background score and music for its soundtrack, also writing its lyrics. The soundtrack album consists of six tracks.

Track listing
No.	Title	Lyrics	Singer(s)	Length
1.	"Anna Needore"	Hamsalekha	S. P. Balasubrahmanyam	5:05
2.	"Jhumu Jhumu"	Hamsalekha	S. P. Balasubrahmanyam, K. S. Chithra	4:22
3.	"Thangiye Thangiye"	Hamsalekha	S. P. Balasubrahmanyam	5:40
4.	"Annayya Hrudayavantha"	Hamsalekha	Rajesh Krishnan, K. S. Chithra	4:32
5.	"Ghama Ghama"	Hamsalekha	Mano, K. S. Chithra, Anuradha Sriram	4:32
6.	"Madhu Magalagi"	Hamsalekha	S. P. Balasubrahmanyam	5:01
