= Balagalittu Olage Baa =

Indian Kannada-language comedy drama film

- VCD cover
- Directed by: Dinesh Baboo
- Written by: Dinesh Baboo
- Produced by: A S Balu
- Starring: S. Narayan; Chaya Singh
- Cinematography: P K H Das
- Edited by: B S Kemparaj
- Music by: Hamsalekha
- Production company: Ambale Arts
- Release date: 12 July 2002
- Country: India
- Language: Kannada

Balagalittu Olage Baa (transl. Enter with your right foot) is a 2002 Indian Kannada-language comedy drama film directed by Dinesh Baboo and starring S. Narayan and Chaya Singh.

== Plot ==
Madhan goes to a student's house not realizing that there is a long time feud between the ancestors of both families. He manages to stay alive by making use of their tradition of treating guests well.

== Cast ==
- S. Narayan
- Chaya Singh
- Mukhyamantri Chandru
- Ramesh Bhat
- Ramakrishna
- M. S. Umesh
- Bank Janardhan
- Karibasavaiah
- Chitra Shenoy
- B. Jayashree
- Sathyapriya

== Production ==
The film was reported to be a family story and was shot at the Jayalakshmi Vilas mansion in the Manasagangotri campus of the University of Mysore. As of April 2002, filming took place for a month with shoots spanning from morning to evening, and Hamsalekha had composed five of the songs. The filming was to be completed by 1 May. As the makers of the film kept the fact that it was a remake of the American film Our Hospitality (1923) under wraps, the film was still given a subsidy by the state government along with other non-remake films.

== Music ==
Balagalittu Olage Baa

Soundtrack album by Hamsalekha
- Released: 2002
- Genre: Feature film soundtrack
- Length: 27:34
- Language: Kannada
- Label: Ashwini Recording Company

Hamsalekha chronology
Cheluve Ondu Heltheeni (2002)	Balagalittu Olage Baa (2002)	Roja (2002)
External audio
- Balagalittu Olage Baa – Jukebox on YouTube

Hamsalekha composed the music and penned the lyrics.

Track listing
No.	Title	Singer(s)	Length
1.	"Hey Rame Rama"	Rajesh Krishnan, Archana Udupa	5:22
2.	"Hadendare" (version 1)	Hemanth, B. Jayashree	3:39
3.	"Nadeyo Ninna"	Shankar Shanbag	1:37
4.	"Shloka" (Prathamam)	K. J. Yesudas	2:43
5.	"Balagalittu Olage Baa"	Hemanth	4:55
6.	"Hutti Bande"	Hemanth, B. Jayashree	3:42
7.	"Hadendare" (version 2)	K. J. Yesudas	5:36
Total length:			27:34

== Release ==
Despite releasing to high expectations, the film was unexpectedly a box office failure.
