= Once More Kaurava =

2017 Kannada-language action drama film

- Directed by: S. Mahendar
- Written by: S. Mahendar
- Produced by: Naresh Gowda
- Starring: Naresh Gowda; Anusha Ranganath
- Cinematography: A V Krishna Kumar
- Edited by: K M Prakash
- Music by: Sridhar V. Sambhram
- Production company: Ayush Enterprises
- Release date: 3 November 2017
- Country: India
- Language: Kannada

Once More Kaurava is a 2017 Indian Kannada-language action drama film written and directed by S. Mahendar and produced by Naresh Gowda. The film stars Naresh Gowda and Anusha Ranganath. It was released on 3 November 2017. The film is an unofficial namesake sequel to Kowrava (2000).

== Plot ==
Once More Kaurava follows a police officer who confronts corruption and crime in society while navigating personal challenges. The story blends action, drama, and romance, characteristic of Kannada masala films.

== Cast ==
- Naresh Gowda
- Anusha Ranganath
- Devaraj
- Anu Prabhakar
- M. S. Umesh
- Bank Janardhan
- Shivaram
- Madhusudhan Rao
- Vijay Chendoor
- Bala Rajwadi

== Reception ==
Once More Kaurava received mixed reviews from critics, who often criticised its formulaic storytelling while praising certain performances. Deccan Chronicle described it as a "same old branded tale," noting a predictable plot but commending the lead performances. Deccan Herald focused on the protagonist's fight against societal issues, but found the narrative reliant on familiar tropes. Bangalore Mirror called it "torn amid the old and the new," appreciating the action sequences but noting the story's lack of innovation.
