= 9 to 12 =

2011 Indian film

- Directed by: Ashok Patil
- Written by: Ashok Patil
- Produced by: Nandish Dhananjay
- Starring: Kishore; Smitha; B. C. Patil
- Cinematography: Niranjan Babu
- Edited by: Shivakumar
- Music by: Sai Karthik
- Production company: Om Creations
- Release date: 1 July 2011
- Country: India
- Language: Kannada

9 to 12 is a 2011 Indian Kannada-language film directed by Ashok Patil, starring Kishore, Smitha and B. C. Patil in lead roles. The film's plot is based on the 2008 Korean film Truck (also known as 24 Hours To Die).

== Cast ==
- Kishore as Munna
- Smitha
- B. C. Patil
- B. V. Radha
- Nagathihalli Chandrashekar
- Nimisha
- Vijay Kaundilya
- M. S. Umesh
- Sanketh Kashi
- Aravind
- Sihi Kahi Chandru
- Bank Janardhan

== Music ==
9 To 12

Soundtrack album by Sai Karthik
- Released: 2011
- Recorded: 2011
- Genre: Feature film soundtrack
- Length: 8:19
- Language: Kannada

Sai Karthik chronology
Police Police (2010)	9 To 12 (2011)	Dhan Dhana Dhan (2011)

Official audio
- 9 To 12 - Full Album on YouTube

Track listing
No.	Title	Singer(s)	Length
1.	"Nannanthare Bengalore"	Harsha	2:58
2.	"Aakasha Bhoomige Bandide"	Raja	4:12
3.	"Kanada Kai Gombe"	Sai Charan	1:49
Total length:			8:19

== Critical response ==
Shruti Indira Lakshminarayana from Rediff.com scored the film at 1.5 out of 5 stars and wrote "B C Patil's 'special role' was much talked about but it is a big let-down. Kishore is talented, no doubt, but not as good as he can be, while Nivedita, who has great potential, is confined to strutting around in half-sarees. Nagathihalli Chandrashekar appears as a cop in the film. Music has little place in this film except for one song, and the editing could have been tighter". A critic from The New Indian Express wrote "Niranjan Babu has done an excellent job behind the camera. As far as performance of other artistes is concerned, Nagathihalli Chandrasekhar has provided good support while Sanketh Kashi has done neat job as a drunkard. The movie is worth watching if you are interested in suspense thrillers". A critic from Bangalore Mirror wrote "Kishore's performance is the highlight of the film. Without his histrionics, the film would have fallen apart. BC Patil, who plays a trigger-happy cop, is patchy. Action thrillers in Kannada in the mould of Hollywood movies were best done by Sunil Kumar Desai. Ashok Patil's attempt at this genre is not good enough to be compared". A critic from News18 India wrote "Kishore Kumar has delivered a good performance. Actress Smitha, who has changed her name to Nivedita, doesn't suit the role. Her limited presence in the film doesn't make any impact. Veteran actress BV Radha has done well. Niranjan Babu's camera work stands out. "9 to 12" is a good watch for people who love suspense thrillers".
