= Avva (film) =

- VCD cover
- Directed by: Kavitha Lankesh
- Written by: P. Lankesh
- Produced by: Pyramid Saimira
- Starring: Shruti; Duniya Vijay; Smitha
- Cinematography: Madhu Ambat
- Edited by: Suresh Urs
- Music by: Thomas Issac Kottukapalli
- Production company: Pyramid Saimira Production International Limited
- Release date: 8 February 2008
- Running time: 134 min
- Country: India
- Language: Kannada

Avva is a 2008 Indian Kannada language drama film directed by Kavitha Lankesh and produced by Pyramid Saimira. The film stars Shruti, Duniya Vijay and Smitha in the lead roles. The film released to positive critical reception and won multiple awards at the Karnataka State Film Awards for that year. The musical score was composed by Issac Thomas Kottukapalli.

The film is based on the novel "Mussanjeya Katha Prasanga" by P. Lankesh. The film speaks about the modern day rural lifestyle, where the caste system, politics and human greed takes over the traditional human values.

== Cast ==
- Shruti as Aane Baddi Rangavva
- Duniya Vijay as Byadara Manja
- Smitha as Savanthri
- Rangayana Raghu as Baramanna
- Master Rakesh as Kariya
- Suchendra Prasad as Udupanna
- Arundhati Nayak
- Enagi Nataraj
- Prasanna
- Ashwath
- Hanumakka

== Release ==
The film was released on 8 February 2008 in Karnataka. The film met with wide positive critical response particularly for the lead actors performances. A critic from Rediff.com wrote that "Avva is a classy film that is bound to be appreciated by people who look for artistic values". A critic from Deccan Herald wrote that "Politicking, gossiping and back-biting interspersed with folk songs bring the movie alive to an urban audience".

== Awards ==
- Karnataka State Film Awards
1. Best Supporting Actress : Smitha
2. Best Story writer: P. Lankesh
