= Shuddhi (2017 film) =

2017 Indian Kannada film by Adarsh Eshwarappa

- Directed by: Adarsh Eshwarappa
- Written by: Adarsh Eshwarappa
- Produced by: Nandini Madesh; Madesh T. Bhaskar
- Starring: Lauren Spartano; Nivedhitha; Amrutha Karagada
- Cinematography: Andrew Aiello
- Edited by: Ramisetty Pavan
- Music by: Score: Jesse Clinton; Song: Nobin Paul
- Production company: Saanvi Pictures
- Distributed by: Jacob Films
- Release date: 17 March 2017
- Running time: 118 minutes
- Country: India
- Language: Kannada

Shuddhi is a 2017 Indian Kannada-language crime drama film written and directed by Adarsh Eshwarappa. The film mainly stars Nivedhitha, Lauren Spartano and Amrutha Karagada in the lead roles. It also stars Shashank Purushotham and Sidhaartha Maadhyamika in supporting roles.

Whilst the cinematography is by Andrew Aiello, the film score was composed by Jesse Clinton. The major portion of the film has been shot using handheld technique which is a rarity in Indian cinema. The sound designer of the film is Nithin Lukose; Shuddhi was one amongst the very few films in Kannada, which was shot in sync sound.

== Plot ==
The plot of the film highlights the crimes against women faced in the society. Karlyn Smith is an American, who lands in the City of Bengaluru in India. She is on a secret mission, which we gradually discover more about, as we cruise along with her on a spiritual journey. Jyothi & Divya are two journalists of a weekly magazine, who alongside their profession, are fighting against the country's lenient Juvenile Justice Act. They form a team and put up street plays in an effort to generate funds and strengthen their protest with a nationwide tour. Rakesh Patil & Bharat Gowda from the state special crime branch office, along with a team are chasing a criminal and in the process, stumble upon a few mysterious killings.

The culmination of the three stories towards the end; gives a new dimension to the film as a whole and concludes Shuddhi.

== Cast ==
- Lauren Spartano as Karyln Smith
- Nivedhitha as Jyothi
- Amrutha Karagada
- Shashank Purushottam
- Sidhartha Maadhyamika
- Ajay Raj as Vinay Muthappa
- Sanchari Vijay
- Vinay Krishnaswamy
- Kiran Vati
- Nagarjun Rajashekhar as Pawan Rai

== Release ==
The film's trailer was launched on 3 February 2017 and was well received. It trended on YouTube at number 3. Shuddhi released on 17 March 2017 and completed a 100-day theatrical run at Box Office. Shuddhi was screened in over 40 Locations Across North America and went on to become one of the first few Kannada Films to be chosen for Screenings by the Japanese Community in Bengaluru. The Film was bought by and is streaming on Netflix from March 2018. Writer & Director Adarsh Eshwarappa also went on to publish the full Screenplay of the Film online.

== Reception ==
A review on Bangalore Mirror reads “The reel- and real- life inspired moments are blended together effortlessly, and synchronised sound recording, a trend that’s catching up in regional cinemas, adds a realistic touch to the movie" The Times of India review read 'To talk about the story and plot would be taking away credit from the good screenplay woven by the maker'.

== Awards ==
Award	Year	Category	Recipient(s) and nominee(s)	Result	Ref(s)
Karnataka State Film Awards	2017	First Best Film	Saanvi Pictures	Won	
Karnataka State Film Awards	2017	Best Director	Adarsh Eshwarappa	Won	
