= Sangharsha (1993 film) =

1993 film by Sunil Kumar Desai

- Directed by: Sunil Kumar Desai
- Written by: Sunil Kumar Desai
- Produced by: Krishna Raju
- Starring: Vishnuvardhan; Geetha; Shivaranjini; Thiagarajan
- Cinematography: P. Rajan
- Edited by: R. Janardhan
- Music by: Guna Singh
- Production company: K. R. Combines
- Release date: 1993
- Running time: 139 minutes
- Country: India
- Language: Kannada

Sangharsha (transl. Struggle) is a 1993 Indian Kannada-language action thriller film written and directed by Sunil Kumar Desai, and produced by Krishna Raju. The film stars Vishnuvardhan, Shivaranjini and Geetha. The film's music is scored by Guna Singh whilst the cinematography is by P. Rajan. The film was dubbed in Tamil as Veera Muzhakkam.

== Cast ==
- Vishnuvardhan as Mahesh
- Geetha as Poornima
- Shivaranjini
- Sundar Krishna Urs
- Thiagarajan
- R. N. Sudarshan
- Ramesh Bhat
- NGEF Ramamurthy
- B. C. Patil
- Avinash
- Rockline Venkatesh
- Mahesh Kumar
- Praveen
- Janakiram
- G. K. Govinda Rao

== Soundtrack ==
The music of the film was composed by Guna Singh. The audio was released on Lahari Music label.

Track listing
No.	Title	Lyrics	Singer(s)	Length
1.	"Ee Hrudaya Geethe"	Doddarange Gowda	S. P. Balasubrahmanyam, K. S. Chithra
2.	"Rosha Kudiyutha"	Doddarange Gowda	S. P. Balasubrahmanyam
3.	"O My Love"	Shyamsundar Kulkarni	Manjula Gururaj
4.	"Nimma Ee Jeevana"	Shyamsundar Kulkarni	S. P. Balasubrahmanyam

== Release ==
According to Desai, "If a thriller is set in one place, it becomes compact and gripping. In ‘Sangharsha’ (1993), I introduced too many characters and the plot kept moving. Because of that, it didn’t connect with the audiences. So I decided it was better to weave my stories around just four-five characters".
