= Bhavana (Kannada actress) =

Indian actress

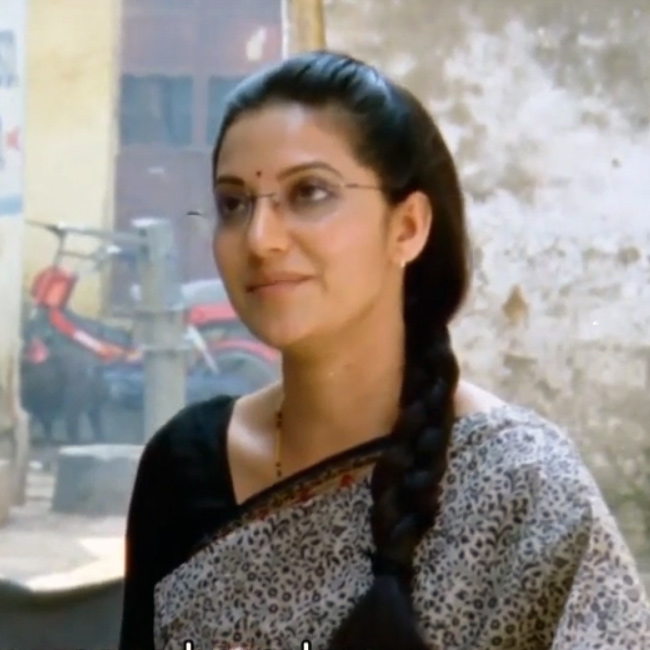
- Bhavana in Vimukthi (2010)
- Born: Nandini Ramanna; Bangalore, Karnataka, India
- Occupation: Actress
- Years active: 1996–present
- Children: 1

Nandini Ramanna (born 1984), better known by her stage name Bhavana, is an Indian actress who works predominantly in the Kannada film industry. A Bharatanatyam dancer, she has received three Karnataka State Film Awards and acted in Shanti, a film that entered the Guinness Book of Records for having the 'fewest actors in a narrative film' (as the film featured only her). Bhavana Ramanna is the director of HomeTown Productions, a production house that conducts dance and music shows.

== Career ==
Bhavana's real name is Nandini Ramanna. Her stage name was suggested by Kodlu Ramakrishna.

Bhavana trained to be a classical dancer and initially had no intention of acting; "films just happened by chance". She learned Bharatanatyam for nearly ten years and aspired for a career as a stage choreographer. She was cast by Krishnappa Uppur in the Tulu film Maribele, after seeing her at a wedding. The film did not do well, but Bhavana was noticed by Kannada film producers. She was cast as heroine in Kodlu Ramakrishna's romance-drama Nee Mudida Mallige and in Seetharam Karanth's musical hit Chandramukhi Pranasakhi starring Ramesh Aravind, and Prema. In Rashtrageethe directed by stalwart K. V. Raju she played a vampish role. Director Dinesh Babu offered her a leading role opposite Ramesh Aravind, in Deepavali, also starring Vishnuvardhan. She made a guest appearance in Vishnuvardhan's Parva . and Ninagagi.

Bhavana did Kavitha Lankesh's Deveeri which got the Aravindan Puraskar award. Bhavana also acted in Kavita Lankesh's second film, Alemaari made for the National Film Development Corporation, which was previewed at many prestigious film festivals but unable to find a commercial release. Bhavana was the only star in Shanti, an off-beat Kannada film directed by the writer Baragur Ramachandrappa. It was the second Indian film to enter the Guinness Book of World Records. in the category 'fewest actors in a narrative film'. It was adjudged the second best film for the State award. Bhavana was adjudged the "Best Actress" for her role in Bhagirathi. She was one of the top Kannada Actresses of 2010 per Rediff.

Bhavana moved to Mumbai for a few years and even did a Bollywood film, Family, that was headlined by Amitabh Bachchan.

== Politics ==
Bhavana campaigned for Indian National Congress (INC) candidates in the 2013 assembly elections in Davanagere among other constituencies. In 2012, she had campaigned for K. Jayaprakash Hegde of the Congress in the Chikmagalur by-election to the Lok Sabha. In 2018, she officially joined the Bharatiya Janata Party (BJP). She rejoined INC in 2021.

== Personal life ==
In July 2025, Bhavana announced that she was pregnant with twins after using in vitro fertilisation. She became pregnant on her first attempt in late 2024 at the age of 40. When speaking with a reporter during her pregnancy, she said: "Even though my children won’t have a father, they will grow up in a home full of art, music, culture, and unconditional love." She delivered a baby girl the following month and named her Rukmini after her maternal grandmother.

== Filmography ==
- Note: all films are in Kannada, unless otherwise noted.

Year	Film	Role	Notes
1996	Maribale		Tulu film
1997	Nee Mudida Mallige		Karnataka State Film Award for Best Supporting Actress
1999	No.1	Durga	
1999	Chandramuki Pranasakhi	Bhavana	
1999	Deveeri		
1999	Anbulla Kadhalukku	Shanthi	Tamil film
2000	Deepavali		
2001	Lankesha		
2001	Ellara Mane Dosenu	Mandara	
2001	Natchatra Kadhal	Malini	Tamil film
2001	Kurigalu Saar Kurigalu		
2001	Rashtrageethe		
2001	Ammaye Navvite	Sirisha	Telugu film
2002	Parva		
2002	Ninagagi		Special appearance
2002	Kshaama		Karnataka State Film Award for Best Actress
2002	Virumbugiren		Tamil film; cameo in song "Pathala Pathala"
2002	Chelvi		
2003	Wrong Number		
2003	Hello		
2003	Aahaa Ethanai Azhagu	Sandhya	Tamil film
2003	Preethi Prema Pranaya	Sheela	
2004	Shanti	Shanti	
2004	Sagari	Divya	
2004	Bhagawan	Bobby	
2006	Family	Virendra's daughter	Hindi film
2008	Inthi Ninna Preethiya	Parimala	
2010	Vimukti	Madhavi	
2010	Aptharakshaka	Neetha	
2012	Chingari		
2012	Bhagirathi	Bhagirathi	Karnataka State Film Award for Best Actress
2014	Crazy Star		
2016	Niruttara	Hamsa	
2022	Once Upon a Time in Jamaligudda		
2023	Otta	Dr. Mary Thomas	Malayalam film

=== Television ===
- Godrej Game Aadi
- Life Change Maadi
- Ramachaari
