= Kadhai (film) =

- Directed by: Abhishek
- Written by: Abhishek
- Produced by: Rajan Radhakrishnan
- Starring: Shaan Kumar; Nivedhitha; Abhinay
- Cinematography: Abushah
- Edited by: R. R. Eashwar
- Music by: Paul Jacob
- Production company: Akash Akshai Raj Cine International
- Release date: 29 January 2010
- Country: India
- Language: Tamil

Kadhai (transl. Story) is a 2010 Indian Tamil-language thriller film written and directed by Abhishek. Produced by Rajan Radhakrishnan, the film stars newcomers Shaan Kumar and Nivedhitha, along with Abhinay in the lead roles. Deepa Venkat, Nalini, and Ganja Karuppu play supporting roles. The music was composed by newcomer Paul Jacob with cinematography by Abushah and editing by R. R. Eashwar. The film was released on 29 January 2010.

== Plot ==
The movie opens when Narain (Shaan), an acclaimed writer, becoming a winner of the Booker prize for one of his works. While he dedicates the honour to his wife Kavya (Nivedhitha), a flashback reveals some secrets in the couple's life.

Narain first sees Kavya playing her violin in a musical theatre. After the performance, Narain and Kavya meet, where he asks her to sign his violin. Narain and Kavya become friends soon after, and they fall in love. One day, when Kavya comes to Narain's home, she notices his awards for his books and realizes that he is an esteemed writer. Narain asks Kavya to marry him right there, and she agrees.

Coming to the present, the husband and wife are now in the United States, where they meet Anand (Abhinay), a childhood friend of Kavya. Narain soon starts to write another book, and when Kavya reads it, she finds out that it is about their personal life, including intercourse. When she confronts her husband, Narain replies that it will only look like a story to the outside world. Narain continues to write his book about how a husband tortures his wife. To truly understand how it feels, Narain tortures Kavya, asking how it felt each time. One day, Anand comes to their home, where he observes how Narain mistreats Kavya. Knowing that Anand knows his secrets, Narain attacks and kills him. Finally, Kavya tries to flee her husband but gets caught. Narain wants to do another "experiment" on her and hangs her from their ceiling fan. Just before death, Narain snaps the rope to ask how Kavya felt and when she did not reply, he decided to hang himself to see how it feels like. On doing so, Narain kills himself, and Kavya is left alone.

== Cast ==
- Shaan Kumar as Narain
- Nivedhitha as Kavya
- Abhinay as Anand
- Nalini as Actress
- Crazy Kumar
- Deepa Venkat as Kavya's friend
- Ganja Karuppu

Uncredited

- Singamuthu
- Nellai Siva as the police inspector
- Balamurali Krishna as himself
- Malgudi Subha as herself
- Chinnaponnu as herself
- Vijay Ganesh

== Production ==
In December 2008, the film was launched at the AVM Studios with a new cast and new crew, with Abhishek, a noted television actor, launching his first directorial venture. A song was shot in March 2009, with several prominent musicians appearing in the film, including Balamurali Krishna, Chinnaponnu and Malgadi Subha.

== Soundtrack ==
Kadhai

Soundtrack album by Paul Jacob
- Released: 29 January 2010
- Recorded: 2009
- Genre: Feature film soundtrack
- Length: 26:35
- Label: Sony Music
- Producer: Paul Jacob

Paul Jacob chronology
365 Kadhal Kadithangal (2009)	Kadhai (2010)	Kattradhu Kalavu (2010)

The soundtrack was composed by newcomer Paul Jacob.

Track listing
No.	Title	Singer(s)	Length
1.	"Phoonk Doonga"	Blaaze, Malgudi Shubha, Shankar Mahadevan	4:47
2.	"Theeradha Vilayaatu Pillai"	Balamurali Krishna, Chinnaponnu	7:36
3.	"The Search (Instrumental)"	Padma Shankar	4:38
4.	"Idhu Thaan Vazhkaiya"	Vasundhara Das	4:08
5.	"Neethaaney"	Shankar Mahadevan, Mahalaxmi Iyer	5:26
Total length:			26:35

== Critical reception ==
The Hindu claimed that "a little more pace in the proceedings would have helped". In terms of performances it labelled Shaan Kumar as having "done a good job right from the beginning", but claimed that Nivedhitha was disappointing. Abinay was told to be "perfect for his role", whilst Nalini, 'Kanja' Karuppu and 'Crazy' Kumar "provide the laughs". Abhishek's direction received a mixed response with the review claiming that he has a "flair for story-telling. But if only he had cut certain unwanted shots, it would have made an interesting film". Sify wrote, "This thriller is worth your time; if you choose to excuse the low production values and hiccups in the histrionics department in favor of good story and decent story telling".
