= U. B. Banakar =

Indian politician

Ujaneshwar Basavannappa Banakar
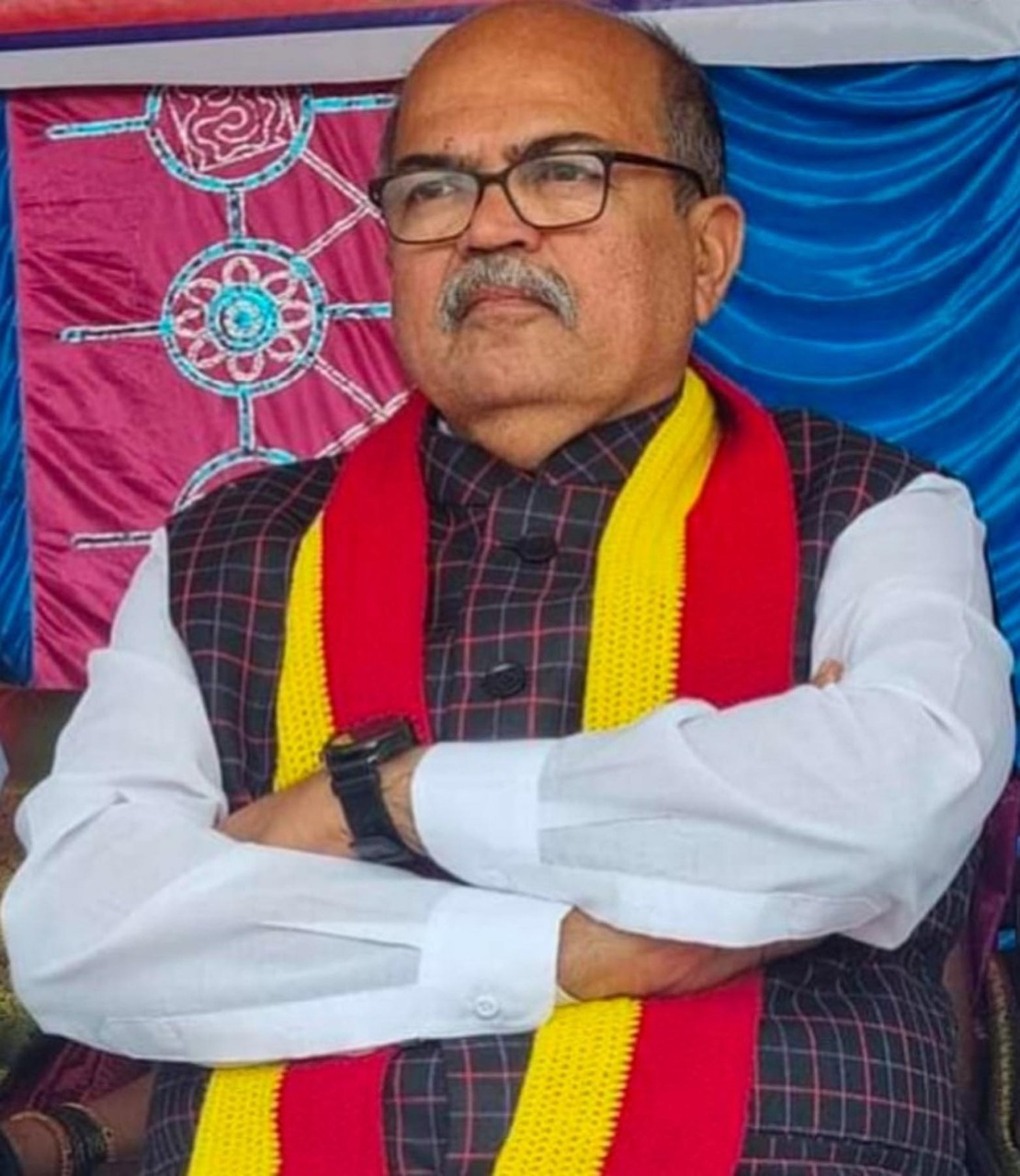
- U. B. Banakar

Member of Karnataka Legislative Assembly
- Incumbent
- Assumed office 2023
- Preceded by: B. C. Patil
- Constituency: Hirekerur
- In office 2013–2018
- Preceded by: B. C. Patil
- Succeeded by: B. C. Patil
- Constituency: Hirekerur
- In office 1994–1999
- Preceded by: B. H. Bannikod
- Succeeded by: B. H. Bannikod
- Constituency: Hirekerur

Personal details
- Born: 4 May 1960 (age 66) Hirekerur, Dharwad district, Mysore state (present day Haveri district, Karnataka)
- Party: Indian National Congress(2022-present)
- Other political affiliations: Bharatiya Janata Party(1994-2005) &(2014-2022) Karnataka Janata Paksha(2012-2014) Independent(2005-2012)
- Spouse: Annapoorna Banakar
- Children: 1, Sharachhandra Banakar
- Parent: B. G. Banakar
- Education: BA, LLB

Ujaneshwar B. Banakar (born 4 May 1960) is an Indian politician from Karnataka who is current member of the Karnataka Legislative Assembly representing Hirekerur Assembly constituency in the Haveri district. He won the 2023 Karnataka Legislative Assembly election on Indian National Congress ticket.

== Early life and education ==
Ujaneshwara Basawaneppa Banakar was born in Chikkonati,Hirekerur. He is the son of former speaker of Karnataka Legislative Assembly and three time MLA, B.G. Banakar. He married Annapoorna. He completed his graduation in arts and did L.L.B.

== Career ==
Banakar first became an MLA winning the 1994 Karnataka Legislative Assembly election from Hirekerur Assembly constituency representing Bharatiya Janata Party. However, he lost the next three consecutive elections from the same seat. He lost on BJP ticket in 1999 and 2004 and then contested unsuccessfully as an independent candidate in 2008. He later shifted to Karnataka Janata Paksha and won the 2013 Karnataka Legislative Assembly election. He polled 52,623 votes and defeated his nearest rival, B. C. Patil, of Indian National Congress by a margin of 2,606 votes. Again he lost the 2018 Assembly election as a BJP candidate to B. C. Patil of Congress by a narrow margin of 555 votes.

He regained the Hirekerur Assembly constituency in the 2023 Karnataka Legislative Assembly election on Indian National Congress ticket. He polled 85,378 votes and defeated his nearest rival, the then Agricultural Minister of Karnataka, B.C.Patil by a margin of 15,020 votes, which is the biggest margin ever in the state legislative assembly election contested by both U. B. Banakar and B. C. Patil, political fires of the constituency.

== Electoral statistics ==
Year	Election	Constituency Name	Party	Result	Opposition Candidate	Opposition Party	Margin
1994	Karnataka Legislative Assembly	Hirekerur	BJP	Won	B. H. Bannikod	JD	9393
1999	Karnataka Legislative Assembly	Hirekerur	BJP	Lost	B. H. Bannikod	IND	3928
2004	Karnataka Legislative Assembly	Hirekerur	BJP	Lost	B. C. Patil	JD(S)	4990
2008	Karnataka Legislative Assembly	Hirekerur	IND	Lost	B. C. Patil	INC	4190
2013	Karnataka Legislative Assembly	Hirekerur	KJP	Won	B. C. Patil	INC	2606
2018	Karnataka Legislative Assembly	Hirekerur	BJP	Lost	B. C. Patil	INC	555
2023	Karnataka Legislative Assembly	Hirekerur	INC	Won	B. C. Patil	BJP	15020
