= Salute (2009 film) =

- Directed by: B. C. Patil
- Produced by: B. C. Patil
- Starring: B. C Patil; Ashwini; Ashok Kheni (GN); K V Nagesh Kumar (SP)
- Cinematography: A R Niranjan Babu
- Edited by: K Eshwar
- Music by: Sai Karthik
- Release date: 2 October 2009
- Country: India
- Language: Kannada

Salute is a 2009 Indian Kannada-language film directed by B. C. Patil starring himself, Ashwini, Ashok Kheni and K V Nagesh Kumar in lead roles.

== Cast ==
- B. C. Patil as himself
- Ashwini
- Ashok Kheni
- K V Nagesh Kumar
- Rachana Maurya

== Music ==
Salute

Soundtrack album by Sai Karthik
- Released: 2009
- Recorded: 2009
- Genre: Feature film soundtrack
- Length: 18:48
- Language: Kannada

Sai Karthik chronology
Brahmanandam Drama Company (2008)	Salute (2009)	Srimathi Kalyanam (2010)

Official audio
- Salute - Full Album on YouTube

Track listing
No.	Title	Singer(s)	Length
1.	"Mastthu Kano Mastthu"	S. P. Balasubrahmanyam	4:18
2.	"Jeevake Jeevava Panavittu"	Ranjith	2:51
3.	"Antantu Antantu"	Suchithra	4:08
4.	"Banda Banda Sevaka"	S. P. Balasubrahmanyam	3:51
5.	"Heegene Onchooru"	Karthik, K. S. Chithra	4:20
Total length:			18:48

== Reception ==
=== Critical response ===
Bangalore Mirror wrote "destroys all corrupt politicians and the Hirekerur MLA ends up as the chief minister of the state. Some miracle like that may spare the audience from more such films". Sify scored the film at 3 out of 5 stars and says "Patil?s dialogue delivery is quite OK but he has forgotten to act. Ashwini as cop in the second half wins for her dialogues. Vijay Kaundinya the new villain on Kannada screen has good career ahead. Onchuru?. song composed by Sai Karthik is passable. Camera by Niranjan is not up to the mark". R G Vijayasarathy of Rediff.com scored the film at 1 out of 5 stars and says "Sai Karthick's background score for the film is effective, but songs are average. Niranjan Babu has completed his work in limited resources. It is difficult to believe that the same Patil who made award-winning films like Nishkarsha and Shaapa earlier, has come up with this one". The New Indian Express wrote "As an ACP, Patil tries to wipe out anti-social elements from Bangalore but politicians come in his way. He resigns from the police department and joins politics. He gets elected as an independent candidate and becomes the home minister. The film ends with Patil becoming the chief minister of Karnataka. Looks like Patil’s wishful thinking was translated into a script".
