= Bhagawan (2004 film) =

- Directed by: H. Vasu
- Written by: Dwarki
- Produced by: Sa. Ra. Govindu
- Starring: Darshan; Daisy Bopanna; Bhavana; Sai Kumar
- Cinematography: K. Krishna Kumar
- Edited by: S. Manohar
- Music by: Rajesh Ramanath
- Production company: Thanu Chitra
- Release date: 6 August 2004
- Running time: 153 minutes
- Country: India
- Language: Kannada

Bhagawan is a 2004 Indian Kannada-language action drama film directed by H. Vasu and written by Dwarki. The film features Darshan and Anjali (Daisy Bopanna) in the lead roles, whilst Bhavana and Sai Kumar play other pivotal roles. The film featured an original score and soundtrack was composed by Rajesh Ramanath.

== Cast ==
- Darshan as Bhagawan "Bhagi"
- Bhavana as Bobby
- Daisy Bopanna (credited as Anjali) as Nanditha
- Sai Kumar Pudipeddi as Devudu
- Rangayana Raghu as Sharath Simha
- Babloo Prithviraj
- Ayyappa P. Sharma
- Nagashekar
- Bullet Prakash
- Bank Janardhan
- Jayalakshmi
- Sundar Raj

== Production ==
The song "Jeeva Jeevakke" was shot at Rockline Studios. The song "Gopalappa" was shot in a dhaba set at Rockline Studios. The filming was completed in the first week of June 2004.

== Soundtrack ==
The music was composed by Rajesh Ramanath.

Track listing
No.	Title	Lyrics	Singer(s)	Length
1.	"Chinage Buddha"	V. Nagendra Prasad	Hemanth
2.	"Chaska Maska Hudugi"	Kaviraj	Chaitra H. G.
3.	"Comeonu Comeonu"	Ramnarayan	Hemanth, Shamitha Malnad
4.	"Suntara Galiya"	Dwarki	Hemanth
5.	"Gopalappa"	V. Nagendra Prasad	B. Jayashree, Rajesh Ramanath
6.	"Jeeva Jeevakke"	Dwarki	Rajesh Krishnan, Lakshmi Manmohan
7.	"Chandrana Ooralli"	K. Kalyan	Rajesh Krishnan, Nanditha

== Reception ==
A critic from Sify wrote that "If you are a fan of Darshan, go and watch it". S. N. Deepak of Deccan Herald wrote "Saikumar’s dialogue delivery in both Kannada and Telugu are worth a mention. Moreover, the film has all the ingredients that appeal to the front benchers — loads of action scenes, an item number by Jr Silk Smitha, the heroine’s dream of hero chasing her in a forest, glamorous Anjali’s dance and her duet with Darshan, the confrontation scenes between Saikumar and Darshan, the family scenes of the hero, Bhavana’s jogging scene and her sentimental mobile scene in the second half".
