= Balagangadharanatha Swamiji =

Indian religious leader

- Born: 18 January 1945 4.44AM; Bananduru, Bidadi, Ramanagara District, Bengaluru, India
- Died: 13 January 2013 (aged 67); BGS Global Hospital, Bengaluru

Gangadharaiah, famously known as Balagangadharanatha Swamiji (18 January 1945 – 13 January 2013) was an Indian religious leader who was the seer of Adichunchanagiri, Nagamangala Taluk, Mandya district. He was awarded Padma Bhushan, India's third highest civilian honour for the year 2010.

== Biography ==
He was born to Chikkalinge Gowda and Boramma as Gangadharaiah. He was born in a Kannada Vokkaliga Community (farming community). He had five siblings - two brothers and three sisters. Shri Gangadharaiah completed his graduation in diploma Science from Government Arts & Science College, Bengaluru. Motivated by the desire to serve God and the people, he chose the spiritual way of life.

Initiated at the age of nineteen, he spent his initial years mastering the Vedas and other sacred texts under the tutelage of his Guru Ramanandanatha Swamiji.

Balagangadharanatha swamiji took over as the 71st Pontiff of the ancient Natha Center of Worship, Shri Adichunchanagiri Math, on 24 September 1974 at the age of 30. He was of the line of Bhakthanatha Swamiji, Chandrashekaranatha Swamiji and Ramanandanatha Swamiji of the ‘Natha Pantha’ (Parampara).

Balagangadharanatha Swamiji died on 13 January 2013, at age 64, due to kidney failure. He was undergoing treatment at BGS Global Hospital, under his control, in Kengeri after his blood pressure went out of control during dialysis.

The mutt witnessed a revolutionary progress under his leadership with several of his flagship projects in education, religion and social service. The seer focused on providing humanitarian services including providing basic necessities like food, education and health for lakhs of people during the last four decades.

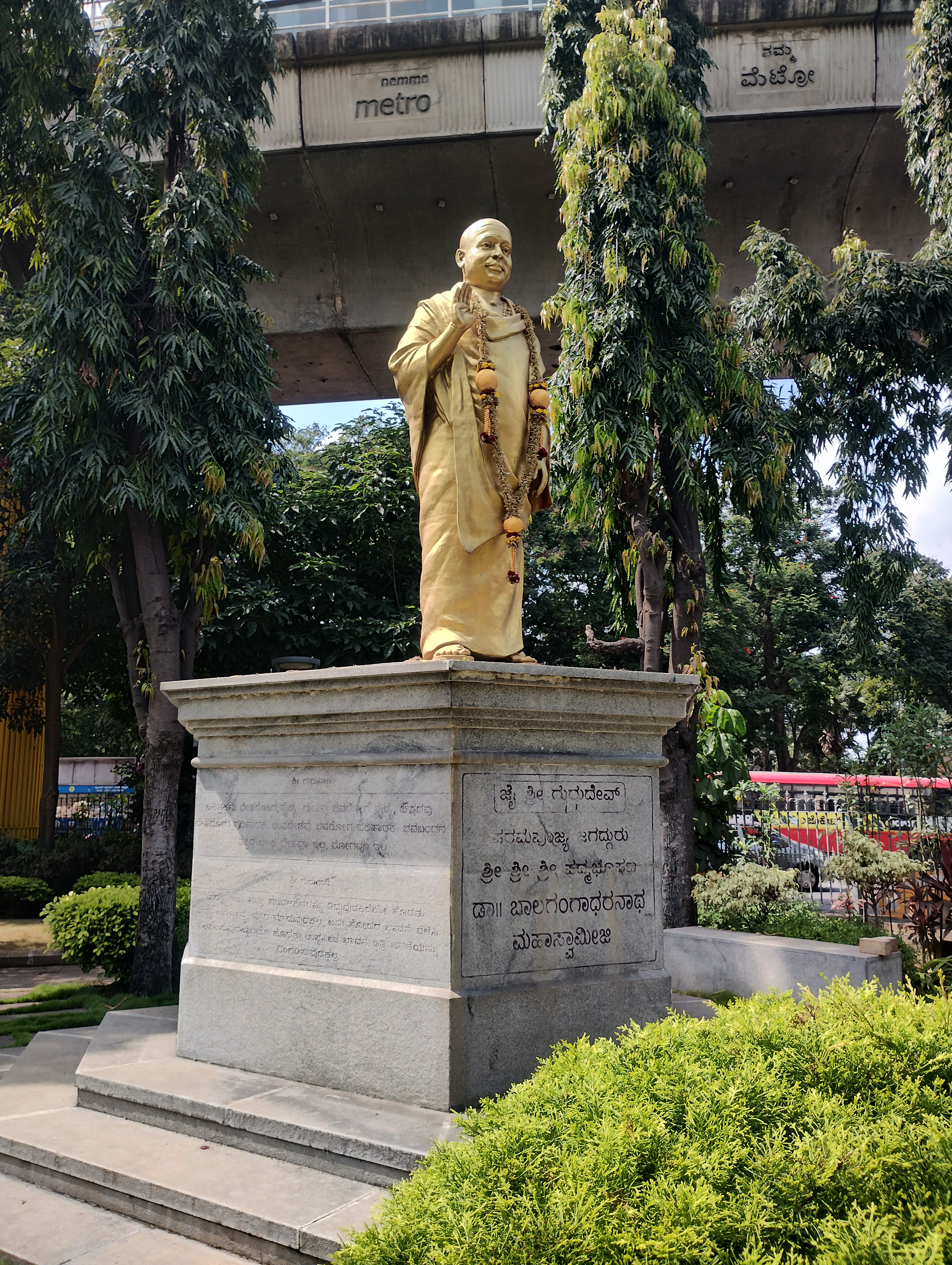
Sculpture of Swamiji in Basava Dhama, Bangalore (2025)

== Awards ==
Year	Award name	Awarded by
1990	National Unity	Global Economic Council, New Delhi
1993	Award	Hindu Temples Samiti, California
1993	Award	Karanataka Samskruthika Sanga, South California
1993	Abhinava Vivekananda	World Religion Conference, Chicago
2002	Parisara Rathna	Karnataka Government
2006	Vidya Samrat	Jain Swamiji Staying in Karnataka
2007	Seva Soorya	Nivarana, Bangalore
2007	Sanathana Dharmarathna	South America & Europe Country Hindu Temples Parishat
2007	Doctorate	International Hindu Vedic University, United States
2008	Akshaya Santha	Nagamangala People
2009	Doctorate	Indira Gandhi University of Medical Sciences
2009	Doctorate	Bangalore University
June 2009	Saadhanaacharya	Mandya District Citizens
2010	Padma Bhushan	Govt of India

== See also ==
- Padma Bhushan Awards (2010–2019)
- Nirmalananda Swamiji
