= Nirmalananda Swamiji =

Pontiff of Sri Adichunchanagiri Mahasamsthana Math

Jagadguru Sri Dr. Nirmalananda Swami
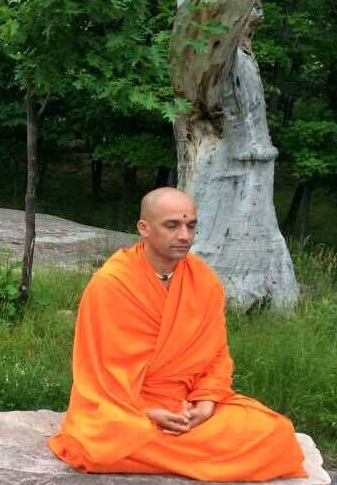
- Nirmalananda Swami
- Title: 72nd Pontiff of Sri Adichunchanagiri Mahasamsthana Math

Personal life
- Born: 20 July 1969 (age 56) Cheernahalli, Gubbi taluk, Tumkur district, Karnataka, India
- Notable work(s): Samvit residential school, Adichunchanagiri University
- Education: BE in Civil Engineering, M.Tech in Structural Engineering, Ph.D in Philosophy.
- Other name: Nagaraj (birth name)

Religious life
- Religion: Hinduism
- Lineage: Natha
- Sect: Adichunchanigiri Math

Senior posting
- Teacher: Parampoojya Balagangadhara Swami
- Website: Adichunchanagiri University

Nirmalananda Swami (known to followers as Jagadguru Sri Sri Sri Dr. Nirmalanandanatha Mahaswamiji, born Nagaraj on 20 July 1969) is the 72nd and current Pontiff of the Sri Adichunchanagiri Mahasamsthana Math, a religious and educational institution in Karnataka, India. He also holds the positions of Chancellor of Adichunchanagiri University and President of the Sri Adichunchanagiri Shikshana Trust, which manages a network of educational institutions. Mahaswamiji attempts to harmonize modern scientific understanding with traditional spiritual teachings, and to increase educational opportunities for underserved communities in India.

== Early life and education ==
Born on July 20, 1969 at Cheranahalli in Gubbi taluk in Tumkur district. He was raised by his parents Narasegowda and Nanjamma who had six children. The family sustained itself by cultivating only 2 acres of land.

Nagaraju finished his primary education in the government school in Cheranahalli, higher primary in nearby Nattekere and high school education in Mavinahalli Government High School.

His academic qualifications include B.E in Civil Engineering, an M.Tech in Structural Engineering from IIT Chennai, with a Gold Medal, and a Ph.D. in Philosophy from Gulbarga University. He has received honorary doctorates from the University of Mysore, Rajiv Gandhi University, and Visvesvaraya Technological University.

After completing his engineering, Swamiji worked as a scientist at Central Water and Power Research Station in Pune but chose instead to volunteer as a teacher at a blind school in Ramanagar district, Karnataka. In 1998, at the age of 29, he renounced worldly life and took Sanyas (monastic vows) under the guidance of his guru, Jagadguru Sri Sri Sri Dr. Balagangadharanatha Mahaswamiji.

== Leadership in education ==
As chancellor of Adichunchanagiri University and president of the Sri Adichunchanagiri Shikshana Trust, Nirmalananda oversees a network of over 500 educational institutions. His leadership has focused on expanding educational access, especially for disadvantaged individuals and communities.

In 2013 he led the establishment of Samvit, a residential school that provides free education to students from underprivileged backgrounds, integrating academic learning with spiritual and ethical values. Nirmalananda also had a role in establishing Adichunchanagiri University.

== Public engagements ==
Nirmalananda has spoken on the connection between spirituality and modern science.

He has also engaged with social issues, including discussions on community reservations in Karnataka, and has met with political leaders including Prime Minister Narendra Modi. He has participated in community events like the Udyami Vokkaliga entrepreneurs meet.
