= Anu Prabhakar =

Indian Kannada actress

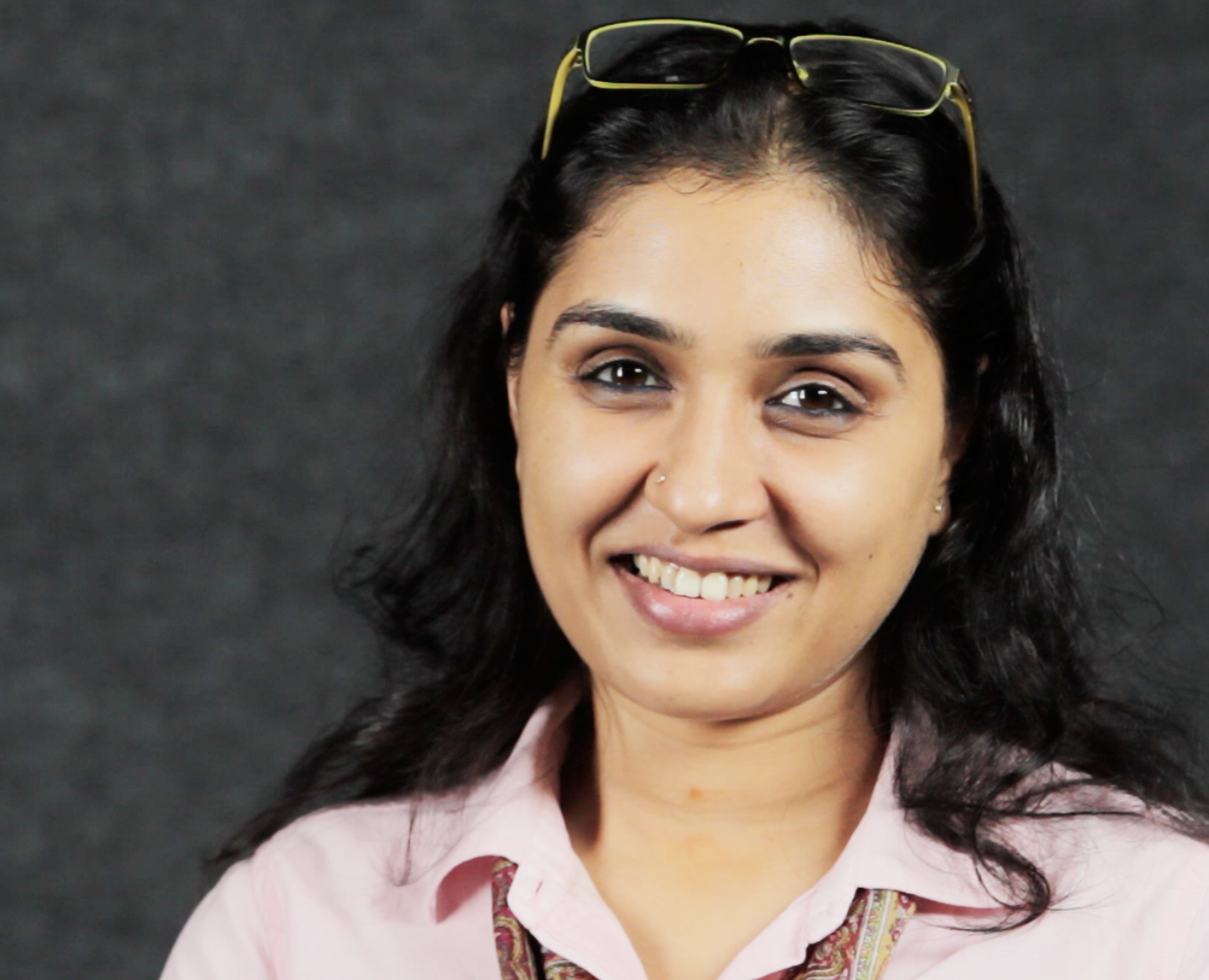
- Anu in TeachAids interview, 2013
- Born: Annapurna Prabhakar; 9 November 1980 (age 45); Bangalore, Karnataka, India
- Occupation: Actress
- Years active: 1989–present
- Spouses: Krishna Kumar (m. 2002; div. 2014) Raghu Mukherjee (m. 2016)
- Children: 1

Annapurna Prabhakar (born 9 November 1980) is an Indian actress, who predominantly appears in Kannada-language films.

== Early life ==
Anu was born in Bangalore on 9 November 1980 to M. V. Prabhakar (died 2003), an engineer with Bharat Heavy Electricals, and Gayathri, a dubbing artiste and actress. Anu grew up in the Malleswaram suburb of Bangalore, and studied in the Nirmala Rani High School. She appeared as a child artiste in Kannada films, and an English television series titled The Mysteries of the Dark Jungle (1990). She dropped out of college when her career as a lead actress took off. She later went on to pursue a master's degree in sociology from Karnataka University through correspondence.

== Career ==
Anu received her first acting offer in 1989 to appear in Chapala Chennigaraya (1990). After working for four years in other films such as Swarna Samsara (1990), Shanti Kranti (1991) and Obbarigintha Obbaru (1992), she enrolled in Mount Carmel College, Bangalore, to study commerce. At this stage, Anu aspired to become an airhostess. However, she was cast as lead opposite Shiva Rajkumar in Hrudaya Hrudaya (1999), produced under the banner Sri Vaishnavi Combines. The film emerged as a commercial success, as was her other release of the year, Snehaloka. Reviewer Srikanth Srinivasa of Deccan Herald, while writing that she needed improvement in her dialogue delivery and diction, wrote that she "comes a whiff of fresh air to the Kannada film industry". On her portrayal as the love interest of Ramesh Aravind's character in Snehaloka, Srinivasa stated that she was "a sweet delight to watch."

Anu would go on to form a popular pair with Ramesh Aravind. She has co-starred with Vishnuvardhan in several films like Soorappa, Jamindarru, Hrudayavantha, Sahukara and Varsha. Anu has acted in a few Tamil movies as well. In 2009, she gave her voice to an HIV/AIDS education animated software tutorial created by nonprofit organisation TeachAids. In her yet-to-release film based on the life of 12th-century Kannada poet Akka Mahadevi, she played a dual role: one of the poet and the other of Jyothi, a girl who pursues PhD on the poet.

== Personal life ==
Anu first married Krishna Kumar, an engineer with the telecommunication department, and son of actress Jayanthi, in March 2002. After 12 years of marriage, the couple applied for a divorce by mutual consent in January 2014. On 25 April 2016, Anu married model-turned-actor Raghu Mukherjee. They have a daughter named Nandana.

== Filmography ==
- Note: all films are in Kannada, unless otherwise noted.

Year	Film	Role	Notes
1990	Chapala Chennigaraya	Anu	Uncredited
1990	Swarna Samsara	Munni	Credited as Baby Annapurna
1991	Shanti Kranti	Young Jyothi	Uncredited
1992	Obbarigintha Obbaru	Mala	Credited as Baby Annapurna
1999	Hrudaya Hrudaya	Usha	Debut as lead actress
1999	Snehaloka	Priya	
2000	Soorappa		Special appearance
2000	Shrirasthu Shubhamasthu	Swapna	
2000	Yaarige Saluthe Sambala	Kusuma	
2001	Hoo Anthiya Uhoo Anthiya	Chandana	
2001	Anjali Geetanjali		
2001	Shaapa	Kaveri	Karnataka State Film Award for Best Actress
2001	Mr. Harishchandra	Pallavi	
2001	Kanasugara		Special appearance
2001	Vishalakshammana Ganda	Vishalakshi	
2001	Shivappanayaka	Girija	
2002	Jamindaarru	Anusuya	
2002	Annayya Tammayya	Anu	
2002	Arputham	Priya	Tamil film
2002	Thavarige Baa Thangi	Gowri	
2002	Olu Saar Bari Olu	Roja	
2003	Shri Kalikamba	Eeswari	Simultaneously shot in Tamil as Annai Kaligambal
2003	Nan Hendthi Maduve	Priya	
2003	Neenilde Nanu Illa Kane	Jyoti / Deepa	
2003	Preethi Prema Pranaya	Kavya	
2003	Hrudayavantha	Gouthami	
2003	Ardhangi	Mahadevi	
2004	Bisi Bisi	Radha Ramesh	
2004	Ok Saar Ok	Divya	
2004	Preethi Nee Illade Naa Hyagirali	Chandramathi	
2004	Kanakambari	Shanti	
2004	Sahukara	Anjali	
2005	Udees	Seetha	
2005	Varsha	Roopa	
2005	Majaa	Selvi	Tamil film
2006	Mohini 9886788888	Sumanna	
2006	Savira Mettilu		
2007	Sri Dhanamma Devi	Sri Dhanamma Devi	
2007	No 73, Shanthi Nivasa	Neetha	
2007	Prarambha	Mother	Short film
2008	Navashakthi Vaibhava	Goddess Annapurneshwari	
2008	Mussanjemaatu	Shwetha	Nominated, Filmfare Award for Best Supporting Actress (Kannada)
2009	Gubbaachigalu	Gayathri	
2009	Bhagyada Balegara		
2010	Banashankari Devi Mahatme		
2010	Pareekshe	Bangari	Karnataka State Film Award for Best Actress
2011	Ko Ko		
2012	Sri Kshetra Adichunchanagiri		
2012	Samsaradalli Golmaal	Ragini	
2013	Garbhada Gudi	Teresa	
2013	Sakkare	Sneha	
2013	Kariya Kan Bitta		Special appearance
2014	Fair & Lovely		
2015	Aatagara	Sandhya Ramagopal	
2016	Shivayogi Sri Puttayyajja		
2017	Once More Kaurava		
2018	Tunturu	Sandhya	
2019	Anukta	Anupama Shetty	
2021	Rathnan Prapancha	Tabassum	
2022	James	Vijay Gayakwad's wife	
2023	Agent	P. Lakshmi	Telugu film
2023	Melody Drama	Indirakka	
2024	Bhairadevi	Shalini	
TBA	Akka	Akka Mahadevi / Jyoti	Filming

=== Television ===
- The Mysteries of the Dark Jungle (1990; English)
- Bale Bangara
- Home Minister
- Shrimati Karnataka
- Manju Musukida Haadi
- Nooru Dinagalu
- Triveni Sangama
- Nannamma Super Star (Judge)
