= B. Jayashree =

Indian theatre personality, actress, singer (born 1950)

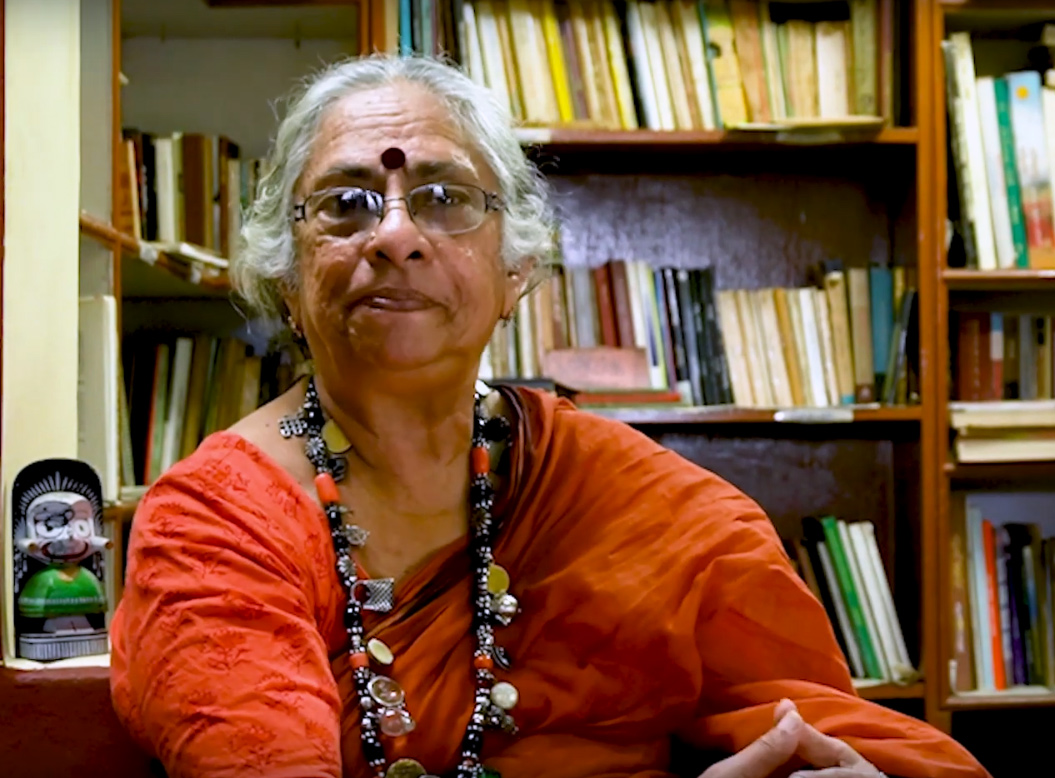
- B. Jayashree in 2019

Member of Parliament, Rajya Sabha (nominated)
- In office 22 March 2010 – 21 March 2016

Personal details
- Born: 9 June 1950 (age 76) Bangalore, India
- Relatives: Gubbi Veeranna (grandfather)
- Occupation: Actor; theatre activist; dubbing artist; singer

B. Jayashree (born 9 June 1950) is a veteran Indian theatre actress, director and singer, who has also acted in films and television and worked as dubbing artist in films. She is the creative director of Spandana Theatre, an amateur theatre company established in Bangalore in 1976.

She was nominated to the Upper house of the Indian Parliament, Rajya Sabha in 2010. She was awarded the Padma Shri, fourth-highest civilian honour by Government of India in 2013.

She is the grand daughter of Gubbi Veeranna, the noted theatre director who founded the Gubbi Veeranna Nataka Company

== Early life and background ==
She was born in Bangalore to G.V. Malathamma who was the daughter of Gubbi Veeranna. She graduated from the National School of Drama, Delhi in 1973, where she trained under noted theatre director and teacher Ebrahim Alkazi.

== Career ==
Over the years, she has worked with notable theatre personalities, including B. V. Karanth. She has acted in Kannada films, like Nagamandala (1997), Deveeri (1999) and Care of Footpath (2006). She was also briefly the director of Mysore-based theatre institute, Rangayana.

She was a voice-over artist for top actresses Madhavi, Gayathri, Jaya Prada, Ambika, Sumalatha and others in Rajkumar movies. As a playback singer she has performed in the hit number "Car Car" for Kannada film, Nanna Preethiya Hudugi.

In 1996, she was awarded the Sangeet Natak Akademi Award for acting, given by the Sangeet Natak Akademi, India's National Academy of Music, Dance & Drama, and the highest Indian recognition given to practicing artists, and later she was nominated to the Rajya Sabha in 2010. She has also received an honorary D. Litt degree from the Karnataka State Open University in 2009.

== Personal life ==
She married K. Ananda Raju and the couple has 2 adopted daughters. Sushma Veer is her biological daughter.

== Filmography ==
=== As actress ===
- Jeevana Chakra (1985)
- Ee Bandha Anubandha (1987)...Vijay's aunt
- Sundara Swapnagalu (1987)
- Malgudi Days (1987)...Muniya's wife
- Cheluvi (1992; Hindi)
- Kotreshi Kanasu (1994)
- Khaki (1996)...Sakamma
- Nagamandala (1997)...Kurudavva
- Kaurava (1998)
- Deveeri (1999)...Rangappa's wife
- Balagalittu Olage Baa (2002)
- Kadamba (2003)
- Durgi (2004)...Durgi's grandmother
- Care of Footpath (2006)...Slummu's caretaker
- Ee Preethi Yeke Bhoomi Melide (2007)
- Banada Neralu (2009)
- Ishtakamya (2016)
- Kiragoorina Gayyaligalu (2016)
- Maasthi Gudi (2017)
- Looty (2018)...Ragpicker
- Mookajjiya Kanasugalu (2019)...Mookajji
- Lineman (2024) (Bilingual)
- Love, Sitara (2024) Hindi

=== As dubbing artist ===
Film	Dubbed for
Babruvahana	Kanchana
Sose Tanda Soubhagya	Vijaya Lalitha
Sanaadi Appanna	Jaya Prada
Parasangada Gendethimma	Reeta Anchan
Huliya Haalina Mevu	Jaya Prada
Ravichandra	Sumalatha
Vasanta Geetha	Gayathri
Guru Shishyaru	Jayamalini
Havina Hede	Sulakshana
Baadada Hoo	Padmapriya
Chalisuva Modagalu	Ambika
Kaviratna Kalidasa	Jaya Prada
Eradu Nakshatragalu	Ambika
Chakravyuha	Ambika
Mooru Janma	Ambika
Ade Kannu	Gayathri
Jwaalamukhi	Gayathri
Bhagyada Lakshmi Baramma	Madhavi
Anuraga Aralithu	Madhavi
Samyuktha	Roopadevi
Shruthi Seridaaga	Madhavi
Shabdavedhi	Jaya Prada
Aarada Gaya	Gayathri (actress)

=== As playback singer ===
- Aaditya (1996) - "Rambhe ee vyaarada Rambhe"
- Naga Devathe (2000) - "Haalundu Hoge"
- Kothigalu Saar Kothigalu (2001) - "Bondana Dummina"
- Durgi (2004) - "Bilthave Nodeega"
- Kadamba (2004) - "Banda Nodamma"
- Nanna Preethiya Hudugi (2001) - "Car Car"
- Balagalittu Olage Baa (2002) - "Hadendare", "Hutti Bande"
- Preethi Prema Pranaya (2003) - "Kabbina Jalle"
- Daasa (2003) - "Kulukabeda"
- Bhagawan (2004) - "Gopalappa"
- Jogi (2005) - "Chikku Bukku Rail"
- Mata (2006) - "Thandaa Thaayee"
- Maathaad Maathaadu Mallige (2007) - "Baaro Nam Therige"
