= List of Indian films without songs =

This is a list of Indian films that have no songs. Although songs and dance often play an integral part in the majority of Indian films, some films (mostly experimental films) choose to exclude them, mostly to focus on the main story.

Year	Title	Language	Ref.
1937	Naujawan	Hindi	
1954	Andha Naal	Tamil	
1955	Pather Panchali	Bengali	
1956	Aparajito	Bengali	
1960	Kanoon	Hindi	
1965	Unnaipol Oruvan	Tamil	
1969	Ittefaq	Hindi	
1971	Seemabaddha	Bengali	
1973	Abachurina Post Office	Kannada	
1977	Agraharathil Kazhutai	Tamil	
1978	Kodiyettam	Malayalam	
1979	Pasi	Tamil	
1980	Albert Pinto Ko Gussa Kyoon Aata Hai	Hindi	
1981	Plot No. 5	Hindi	
1981	Kalyug	Hindi	
1982	Elippathayam	Malayalam	
1983	Jaane Bhi Do Yaaro	Hindi	
1984	Accident	Kannada	
1986	Ek Ruka Hua Faisla	Hindi	
1986	New Delhi Times	Hindi	
1987	Kadamai Kanniyam Kattupaadu	Tamil	
1987	Pushpaka Vimana	None	
1987	Amrutham Gamaya	Malayalam	
1987	Vanna Kanavugal	Tamil	
1988	Veedu	Tamil	
1988	Antima Teerpu	Telugu	
1988	Aparan	Malayalam	
1988	Oru CBI Diary Kurippu	Malayalam	
1988	August 1	Malayalam	
1988	Om-Dar-B-Dar	Hindi	
1989	Tarka	Kannada	
1989	Idu Saadhya	Kannada	
1989	Jagratha	Malayalam	
1989	Raakh	Hindi	
1989	Rajakeeya Chadarangam	Telugu	
1989	Sandhya Raagam	Tamil	
1990	Oru Veedu Iru Vaasal	Tamil	
1990	Utkarsha	Kannada	
1990	Uchi Veyil	Tamil	
1990	Mathilukal	Malayalam	
1990	Mukham	Malayalam	
1991	Marupakkam	Tamil	
1991	Uruvam	Tamil	
1992	Kubi Matthu Iyala	Kannada	
1992	Raat	Hindi / Telugu	
1992	Thalastaanam	Malayalam	
1993	Nishkarsha	Kannada	
1993	Airport	Tamil	
1993	Ekalavyan	Malayalam	
1993	Sthalathe Pradhana Payyans	Malayalam	
1994	Vidheyan	Malayalam	
1994	Commissioner	Malayalam	
1994	Curfew	Kannada	
1995	Kuruthipunal	Tamil	
1995	The King	Malayalam	
1996	Police Story	Kannada	
1997	Chupp	Hindi	
1998	Hyderabad Blues	English	
1998	Nishyabda	Kannada	
1998	The Truth	Malayalam	
1999	Pathram	Malayalam	
1999	House Full	Tamil	
1999	Prathyartha	Kannada	
1999	F. I. R.	Malayalam	
1999	Kaun?	Hindi	
1999	Mugam	Tamil	
2000	Dollar Dreams	Telugu / English	
2001	9 Nelalu	Telugu	
2002	Marma	Kannada	
2002	Atithi	Kannada	
2002	Dweepa	Kannada	
2002	Shivam	Malayalam	
2003	3 Deewarein	Hindi	
2003	Bhoot	Hindi	
2003	Chokher Bali	Bengali	
2004	Ab Tak Chhappan	Hindi	
2004	Adhu	Tamil	
2004	Sethurama Iyer CBI	Malayalam	
2004	Shock	Tamil	
2005	Sins	English	
2005	Shanti	Kannada	
2005	Bharathchandran I.P.S.	Malayalam	
2005	Nerariyan CBI	Malayalam	
2006	Nandanavanam 120km	Telugu	
2006	Cyanide	Kannada	
2006	Kithakithalu	Telugu	
2007	Frozen	Hindi / Ladakhi	
2007	Police Story 2	Kannada	
2007	Parzania	English	
2008	Ashoka	Tamil	
2008	A Wednesday!	Hindi	
2008	Akku	Tamil	
2008	Mumbai Meri Jaan	Hindi	
2008	Roudram	Malayalam	
2008	Sound of Boot	Malayalam	
2009	Bhagavan	Malayalam	
2009	Harishchandrachi Factory	Marathi	
2010	Aaranya Kaandam	Tamil	
2010	Fired	Hindi	
2010	Rokkk	Hindi	
2010	Shock	Kannada	
2011	Nadunisi Naaygal	Tamil	
2011	Payanam	Tamil / Telugu	
2011	Police Story 3	Kannada	
2012	Bhoot Returns	Hindi	
2012	The King & the Commissioner	Malayalam	
2013	Apur Panchali	Bengali	
2013	Attahasa	Kannada	
2013	Chander Pahar	Bengali	
2013	The Lunchbox	Hindi / English	
2013	Mahabharat Aur Barbareek	Hindi	
2013	Mumbai Police	Malayalam	
2013	Onaayum Aattukkuttiyum	Tamil	
2013	Thalaimuraigal	Tamil	
2014	Agadam	Tamil	
2014	Anukshanam	Telugu	
2014	Court	Marathi / Hindi / Gujarati / English	
2014	Riyasat	Hindi	
2015	Aligarh	Hindi	
2015	Karma	Tamil	
2015	Parched	Hindi	
2015	Visaranai	Tamil	
2015	Taskara	Telugu	
2016	U Turn	Kannada	
2016	Kuttrame Thandanai	Tamil	
2016	Seesa	Telugu	
2016	Veeram	Malayalam / Hindi / English	
2017	Chennaiyil Oru Naal 2	Tamil	
2017	Gali Guleiyan	Hindi	
2017	Ghazi	Telugu / Hindi	
2017	Omerta	Hindi / English	
2017	Thupparivaalan	Tamil	
2017	To Let	Tamil	
2017	Vaigai Express	Tamil	
2018	Naachiyaar	Tamil	
2018	Sometimes	Tamil	
2018	X Videos	Hindi / Tamil	
2018	Andhagaara	Kannada	
2018	Awe	Telugu	
2018	CzechMate: In Search of Jiří Menzel	English	
2018	Johnny	Tamil	
2018	Inba Twinkle Lilly	Tamil	
2018	Mercury	Sound	
2018	Lust Stories	Hindi	
2019	Mardaani 2	Hindi	
2019	Devaki	Kannada	
2019	Albert Pinto Ko Gussa Kyun Aata Hai?	Hindi	
2019	Game Over	Tamil / Telugu	
2019	Kedara	Bengali	
2019	Kaithi	Tamil	
2019	V1	Tamil	
2019	Agni Devi	Tamil	
2019	CandyFlip	English/Hindi	
2019	Eeb Allay Ooo!	Hindi	
2019	Kolaiyuthir Kaalam	Tamil	
2019	Watchman	Tamil	
2019	Section 375	Hindi	
2019	Super Deluxe	Tamil	
2019	Suttu Pidikka Utharavu	Tamil	
2019	Udgharsha	Kannada	
2020	London Confidential	Hindi	
2020	Mrs. Serial Killer	Hindi	
2021	Irul	Malayalam	
2021	Joji	Malayalam	
2021	Collar Bomb	Hindi	
2021	Sardar Udham	Hindi	
2022	Naan Mirugamaai Maara	Tamil	
2022	Kaatteri	Tamil	
2023	Por Thozhil	Tamil	
2023	Ghost	Kannada	
