= 1995–96 Karnataka State Film Awards =

Annual Indian film awards ceremony

The Karnataka State Film Awards 1995–96, presented by the Government of Karnataka, honoured the best of Kannada Cinema released in the year 1995.

== Lifetime achievement award ==
Name of Award	Awardee(s)	Awarded As
• Dr. Rajkumar Award • Puttanna Kanagal Award	• R. Lakshman • Dorai - Bhagwan	• Producer • Director

== Film awards ==
Name of Award	Film	Producer	Director
First Best Film	Sangeetha Sagara Ganayogi Panchakshara Gavai	Chindodi Leela	Chindodi Bangaresh
Second Best Film	Kraurya	Nirmala Chitagopi	Girish Kasaravalli
Third Best Film	Beladingala Baale	B. S. Murali	Sunil Kumar Desai
Best Film Of Social Concern	Urvashi	Lalithamma Lingaiah	Amaradeva
Best Children Film	Naaviddeevi Echcharike		T. S. Nagabharana

== Other awards ==
Name of Award	Film	Awardee(s)
Best Direction	Sangeetha Sagara Ganayogi Panchakshara Gavai	Chindodi Bangaresh
Best Actor	Om	Shiva Rajkumar
Best Actress	Om	Prema
Best Supporting Actor	Sangeetha Sagara Ganayogi Panchakshara Gavai	Girish Karnad
Best Supporting Actress	Huliya	Pooja Lokesh
Best Child Actress	Mouna Raaga	Sindhu
Best Music Direction	Sangeetha Sagara Ganayogi Panchakshara Gavai	Hamsalekha
Best Male Playback Singer	Anuraga Sangama ("O Mallige Ninnondige")	Ramesh Chandra
Best Female Playback Singer	Urvashi ("Oh Priyathama Maralali Aa Sambramha")	Chandrika Gururaj
Best Cinematography	Om	B. C. Gowrishankar
Best Editing	Sipayi	K. Balu
Best Lyrics	Kavya ("Vandane Vandane")	Doddarange Gowda
Best Sound Recording	Sipayi	Mahendar
Best Art Direction	Sipayi	• Nazeer • Ismail
Best Story Writer	Urvashi	Gorur Ramaswamy Iyengar
Best Screenplay	Om	Upendra
Best Dialogue Writer	Beladingala Baale	• Sunil Kumar Desai • Vamshi
Jury's Special Award	Beladingala Baale	Manjula Gururaj (For Voice Dubbing)
