= 1998–99 Karnataka State Film Awards =

Annual Indian film awards ceremony

The Karnataka State Film Awards 1998–99 were presented by the Government of Karnataka, to felicitate the best of Kannada Cinema released in the year 1998.

== Lifetime achievement award ==
| Name of Award | Awardee(s) | Awarded As |
|---|---|---|
| • Dr. Rajkumar Award • Puttanna Kanagal Award | • U. S. Vadiraj • T. S. Nagabharana | • Actor, Producer • Director |

== Film awards ==
| Name of Award | Film | Producer | Director |
|---|---|---|---|
| First Best Film | Chaitrada Chiguru | Gururaj Seth | K. Shivarudraiah |
| Second Best Film | Hoomale | K. S. Usha Rao | Nagathihalli Chandrashekar |
| Third Best Film | Doni Saagali | H. N. Maruthi | S. V. Rajendra Singh Babu |
| Best Film Of Social Concern | Bhoomi Thayiya Chochchala Maga | • Jai Jagadish • R. Dushyanth Singh | S. V. Rajendra Singh Babu |
| Best Regional Film | Onthe Yedjust Mallpy (Tulu language) | | |

== Other awards ==
| Name of Award | Film | Awardee(s) |
|---|---|---|
| Best Direction | Chaitrada Chiguru | K. Shivarudraiah |
| Best Actor | Veerappa Nayaka | Vishnuvardhan |
| Best Actor | Hoomale | Ramesh Aravind |
| Best Actress | Doni Saagali | Soundarya |
| Best Supporting Actor | Tuvvi Tuvvi Tuvvi | Doddanna |
| Best Supporting Actress | Tuvvi Tuvvi Tuvvi | Jayanthi |
| Best Child Actor | Varsharuthu | Sukhesh |
| Best Male Playback Singer | Varsharuthu | C. Aswath |
| Best Female Playback Singer | Hrudayanjali ("Omkara Naadamaya") | Anuradha Sriram |
| Best Cinematography | Doni Saagali | D. V. Rajaram |
| Best Editing | Varsharuthu | Basavaraj Urs |
| Best Lyrics | Pratibhatane ("Hasuvina") | Siddhalingaiah |
| Best Sound Recording | Swasthik | S. Mahendran |
| Best Art Direction | Swasthik | M. Ismail |
| Best Story Writer | Bhoomi Thayiya Chochchala Maga | S. V. Rajendra Singh Babu |
| Best Screenplay | Prathyartha | Sunil Kumar Desai |
| Best Dialogue Writer | Bhoomi Thayiya Chochchala Maga | S. Surendranath |
| Jury's Special Award | Veerappa Nayaka (For Film) | Producer: Bhagyavathi Narayan; Director: S. Narayan |
