= Ashok Pai =

Indian psychiatrist, writer and film producer (1946–2016)

Dr. K. A. Ashok Pai
- Born: 30 December 1946
- Died: 29 September 2016 (aged 69); Dublin, Ireland
- Occupations: Psychiatrist, writer and film producer

K. A. Ashok Pai (30 December 1946 – 29 September 2016) was an Indian psychiatrist, writer and film producer based in Shimoga. He served as the chairman of Karnataka Mental Health Taskforce.

Ashok Pai founded the Manasa Nursing Home and the Manasa Educational Foundation in Shimoga.

He died of cardiac arrest on 29 September 2016.

== Filmography ==
=== Films produced ===
Pai has produced four films all of which have been directed by Suresh Heblikar:

- Kadina Benki (1989) - national and state awards winning film
- Prathama Ushakirana (1990) - state award-winning film
- Aagatha (1995) - also writer
- Mana Manthana (2017)

=== Television ===
Pai produced a series called Antarala which had ten episodes with Girish Karnad as the lead actor.
