= Sparsha (film) =

- Film VCD cover
- Directed by: Sunil Kumar Desai
- Written by: Sunil Kumar Desai
- Produced by: Sarovar Sanjeev Rao
- Starring: Sudeep; Rekha; Sudha Rani; Naveen Mayur
- Cinematography: H. C. Venugopal
- Edited by: R. Janardhan
- Music by: Hamsalekha
- Production company: Sarovar Productions
- Release date: 23 July 2000
- Running time: 154 minutes
- Country: India
- Language: Kannada
- Budget: est. ₹2 crore

Sparsha (transl. The Touch) is a 2000 Indian Kannada-language romance film written and directed by Sunil Kumar Desai. It stars Sudeep, Rekha and Sudha Rani. Naveen Mayur, Sihi Kahi Chandru, Kashi, Umashree and Vanishree feature in supporting roles.

Upon theatrical release on 23 July 2000, the film opened to widespread positive reviews from critics and the audience. However, the screening had to be stopped after bandh was called for in most towns and cities of Karnataka following the abduction of Rajkumar, the Kannada actor, in July 2000, thereby affecting the film's collections. After normality resumed, the film completed a 100-day run in theatres.

== Plot ==
Sudeep (Sudeep) is a film actor and model. He falls in love with Suma (Rekha) during a film shoot in Ooty. They meet each other, share their views, and Sudeep meets with Suma's family. Some incidents educate Sudeep that those who make mistakes correct themselves and apologize next. When Sudeep is rushing to see off his lover at the Ooty railway station, he accidentally knocks an unknown young woman, Radha (Sudha Rani), onto the path of a moving train. Radha does not see who knocked her over but only catches a glimpse of the jacket he wears. The accident causes her to lose a leg, as well as the love of her fiancée. Sudeep rushes to the accident spot and takes her to the hospital. He takes care of her but refrains from telling both Radha and Suma that he was responsible for the accident. To avoid the consequences, Sudeep offers to marry Radha. Suma is hurt by his sudden change of heart but accepts his decision. Radha accepts his offer too but continues to hunt for the man who knocked her over. How the truths unfold forms the rest of the story.

== Cast ==
- Sudeep as Sudeep
- Rekha as Suma
- Sudha Rani as Radha
- Naveen Mayur as Ramesh
- Sihi Kahi Chandru as Suma's uncle
- Sanketh Kashi as Taxi Driver
- Umashree
- Anupam
- Vanishree as Mangala
- Jayaram
- Kishori Ballal
- Vidya Murthy
- Ramya
- Rekhamrutha
- Jayashree Raj as Sudeep's friend
- Tharakesh Patel
- Bijjal
- Prithviraj
- Pushpa Swamy
- Radha Ramachandra
- Malathi Saroj
- Shailaja Somashekar
- Ayyappa

== Production ==
Prior to Sparsha, Sudeep had appeared in minor roles in Thayavva (1997) and Prathyartha (1999). The director of the latter film, Sunil Kumar Desai, was roped to direct Sparsha by Sudeep's father Sarovar Sanjeev Rao, who produced the film under the banner Sarovar Productions. Model Rekha was chosen as the heroine. Filming which began in early 2000 had to be stopped a few days in, after Sudeep fell ill from typhoid. He "lost weight" and "looked haggard" before the shooting resumed. Filming took place for a period of 99 days in Bangalore, Hyderabad, Darjeeling, Ooty, Kushalnagar and Chikmagalur.

== Soundtrack ==
Sparsha

Soundtrack album by Hamsalekha
- Released: 2000
- Genre: Feature film soundtrack
- Length: 43:43
- Language: Kannada
- Label: Akash Audio
- Producer: Hamsalekha

Hamsalekha chronology
Soorappa (2000)	Sparsha (2000)	Devara Maga (2000)
External audio
- Official Audio Jukebox on YouTube

Hamsalekha scored for the film and its soundtracks, also penning lyrics for the soundtrack with Shyamsundar Kulkarni, Hamsalekha, K. Kalyan, Itagi Eeranna, Doddarange Gowda and R. N. Jayagopal. The album consists of eight tracks and was distributed in the market by Akash Audio. Popular ghazal singer Pankaj Udhas made his debut in Kannada with this film, singing two songs ,"Chandakintha Chanda" and "Bareyada Mouna" while also singing for its Telugu dubbed version.

No.	Title	Lyrics	Singer(s)	Length
1.	"Managala Sarigama Prema"	Shyamsundar Kulkarni	Rajesh Krishnan, Archana Udupa	6:07
2.	"Ivale Avalu"	K. Kalyan	Hariharan	5:17
3.	"Chandakintha Chanda"	Itagi Eeranna	Pankaj Udhas	5:53
4.	"Oho Chenne"	Hamsalekha	Hariharan, K. S. Chithra	5:10
5.	"Paduvana Dikkinaage"	Doddarange Gowda	C. Ashwath, B. Jayashree	5:03
6.	"Sangathi Heegeke"	R. N. Jayagopal	K. S. Chithra, Rajesh Krishnan	5:02
7.	"Bareyada Mounada Kavithe"	R. N. Jayagopal	Pankaj Udhas, Kavita Krishnamurthy, Archana Udupa	5:29
8.	"Kanasali Kaaduva Hudugi"	Doddarange Gowda	Sonu Nigam, Kavita Krishnamurthy	5:40
Total length:				43:41

== Release and reception ==
The film was released theatrically on 23 July 2000. After a run in Karnataka, it was 'specially' screened in parts of Tamil Nadu and Andhra Pradesh. Between 2001 and 2002, it was screened in various parts of the United States.

The film received mixed to negative reviews from critics upon release. M. D. Riti reviewed the film for Rediff.com and wrote, "Desai relies largely on music to carry this film through. But the music is, of course, of a very different genre: it is soft, melodious and full of Kannada shayari." Despite rating the film well, she felt that it lacked the "special appeal that Desai's earlier films, Beladingala Baale and Nishkarsha had". She further wrote, "Where Sparsha seems to fall short is in the acting skills of its lead pair. Rekha comes across as rather wooden, while Sudeep certainly has the chocolate box good looks that his role calls for, but fails to deliver any powerful histrionics." Adding to it, she rated the music highly before concluding writing, " If only the stars had had more charisma or talent, this film by Desai might have made him even better remembered than his past ventures."

The reviewer for Screen felt that it was a "touching, gripping, captivating and worth-watching film only for the last half an hour." They added Desai's "touch of dexterity is ... missing in some places. His usual verve and agility are not found in this film." They called the music "pleasant to the ears with three songs scored melodiously", editing "jerky" and that the "cinematography by Venu is the high point of the film". Performances of the leading pair, Sudeep and Rekha, were commended in that they "show promise". Indiainfo.com gave the film a negative review and called it "one of those yawn-inducing sagas of unending sacrifices which border on the ridiculous." This reviewer too commended the camerawork on the film and called it "only plus point in the film" before criticizing the performances of the lead actors.

Telugucinema.com reviewing the Telugu-dubbed version wrote, "The subject was sensitively handled by the director sunil kumar desai".

== Awards and nominations ==
2000–01 Karnataka State Film Awards

- Best Lyricist — Itagi Eeranna (for "Chandkintha Chanda")

48th Filmfare Awards South

- Best Film
- Best Director — Sunil Kumar Desai
- Best Actress — Sudha Rani

Film Fan's Association Awards – Kannada

- Best Film
- Best Actor — Sudeep
- Best Supporting Actress — Sudharani

Cinema Express Awards

- Best Film – Kannada
- Best Director — Sunil Kumar Desai

2001 Asianet Kaveri Film Awards

- Best Director — Sunil Kumar Desai
- Best New Face of The Year (Male) — Sudeep
- Best New Face of The Year (Female) — Rekha
- Best Cameraman — H. C. Venugopal
- Best Music Director — Hamsalekha (also for Shabdavedhi)
- Best Lyricist — Hamsalekha (also for Shabdavedhi, Yajamana and Preethse)

2000 Videocon–Suprabhata Awards

- Best Film
- Best Director — Sunil Kumar Desai
- Best Newcomer Actor — Sudeep
- Best Newcomer Actress — Rekha
- Best Cinematographer — H. C. Venugopal
- Best Editor — R. Janardhan

The Karnataka Welfare Association For Blind

- Award — Sudeep
