= 43rd Filmfare Awards South =

Award ceremony for South Indian films

- Date: 14 September 1996
- Site: Kamaraj Memorial Hall, Madras, Tamil Nadu, India
- Hosted by: Heera Rajagopal, VJ Karthik

Highlights
- Most awards: Bombay (Tamil), 4

The 43rd Filmfare Awards South ceremony honoring the winners and nominees of the best of South Indian cinema films released 1995, was held in Madras on 14 September 1996 at Kamaraj Hall.

== Main awards ==
=== Kannada cinema ===
Best Film	Best Director
Beladingala Baale	Sunil Kumar Desai – Beladingala Baale
Best Actor	Best Actress
Shiva Rajkumar – Om	Shruti – Aagatha

=== Malayalam cinema ===
Best Film	Best Director
Spadikam	Bhadran – Spadikam
Best Actor	Best Actress
Mohanlal – Spadikam	Annie Shaji Kailas – Mazhayethum Munpe
Best Music Director
Raveendran – Mazhayethum Munpe

=== Tamil cinema ===
Best Film	Best Director
Bombay	Mani Ratnam – Bombay
Best Actor	Best Actress
Kamal Haasan – Kuruthipunal	Manisha Koirala – Bombay
Best Music Director
A. R. Rahman – Bombay

=== Telugu cinema ===
Best Film	Best Director
Subha Sankalpam	K. Vishwanath - Subha Sankalpam
Best Actor	Best Actress
Mohan Babu – Pedarayudu	Soundarya – Ammoru
Best Music Director
M. M. Keeravani – Subha Sankalpam

== Special awards ==
Lifetime Achievement: Nagesh; Manorama	Special Award for Best Child Actor: Akhil for Sisindri
