= 38th Filmfare Awards South =

Award ceremony for South Indian films

- Date: 11 August 1991
- Site: Kamaraj Memorial Hall Madras, Tamil Nadu, India
- Hosted by: Kasturi

The 38th Filmfare Awards South Ceremony honouring the winners of the best of South Indian cinema in 1990 is an event held on 11 August 1991 was an event held at the Kamaraj Memorial Hall, Madras. The chief guests were Tamil Nadu Governor Bhishma Narain Singh and actor Shatrughan Sinha.

== Awards ==
=== Main awards ===
==== Kannada cinema ====
Best Film	Best Director
Prathama Ushakirana	Suresh Heblikar - Prathama Ushakirana
Best Actor	Best Actress
Ananth Nag- Udbhava	Suhasini - Muthina Haara
Best Music Director
S. A. Rajkumar - Shruthi

==== Malayalam cinema ====
Best Film	Best Director
Thazhvaram	Bhadran - Iyer The Great
Best Actor	Best Actress
Mammootty - Mathilukal	Shobhana - Innale
Best Music Director
Raveendran - His Highness Abdullah

==== Tamil cinema ====
Best Film	Best Director
Pudhu Vasantham	Mani Ratnam -Anjali
Best Actor	Best Actress
Karthik - Kizhakku Vasal	Radhika -Keladi Kanmani
Best Music Director
S. A. Rajkumar - Pudhu Vasantham

==== Telugu cinema ====
Best Film	Best Director
Karthavyam	K. Raghavendra Rao - Jagadeka Veerudu Athiloka Sundari
Best Actor	Best Actress
Rajasekhar- Magaadu	Vijayashanti - Karthavyam
Best Music Director
Ilayaraja- Bobbili Raja

=== Special awards ===
Lifetime Achievement
- M. T. Vasudevan Nair (Screenplay writer, Film director)

== Awards presentation ==
- V. B. K. Menon (Best Film Malayalam) Received Award from Ramki
- K. A. Ashok Pai (Best Film Kannada) Received Award from Vani Ganapathy
- A. M. Rathnam (Best Film Telugu) Received Award from Nirosha
- R. B. Choudary (Best Film Tamil) Received Award from Balu Mahendra
- Bhadran (Best Director Malayalam) Received Award from Archana
- Suresh Heblikar (Best Director Kannada) Received Award from Gulshan Grover
- Mani Ratnam (Best Director Tamil) Received Award from Shilpa Shirodkar
- Ravindran (Best Music Director Malayalam) Received Award from Jayachitra
- S. A. Rajkumar (Best Music Director Kannada) & (Best Music Director Tamil) Received Award from Srividya
- Shobana (Best Actress Malayalam) Received Award from Shatrughan Sinha
- Suhasini (Best Actress Kannada) Received Award from Venkatesh
- Nirosha Received on behalf of sister Radhika Award (Best Actress Tamil) from G. Venkateswaran
- Mammootty (Best Actor Malayalam) Received Award from Rekha
- Rajasekhar (Best Actor Telugu) Received Award from Romu Sippy
- Karthik (Best Actor Tamil) Received Award from Poonam Sinha
- M. T. Vasudevan Nair (Special Award) Received Award from Bhishma Narain Singh
