= Vanitha Vasu =

Indian actress

- Born: Bengaluru, Karnataka, India
- Occupation: Actress
- Years active: 1987–present
- Known for: Tarka; Kadina Benki; Utkarsha
- Spouse: Sundar

Vanitha Vasu is an Indian actress who has appeared in many Kannada films. She is best known for her roles in Aaganthuka (1987), Kadina Benki (1988), Tarka (1989), Utkarsha (1990) and Nagamandala (1997).

Vanitha Vasu was born in Bangalore and completed her education in MES College. She has acted in films and television series and starred opposite all the stalwarts of Kannada film industry like Vishnuvardhan, Anant Nag, Shankar Nag, Ambareesh, Kashinath and Suresh Heblikar.

== Filmography ==
Year	Film	Role	Notes
1987	Aaganthuka		
1988	Chiranjeevi Sudhakar		
1988	Shakthi		
1988	Krishna Rukmini		
1988	Kadina Benki		
1988	Ganda Mane Makkalu	Yashoda	
1989	Tarka	Sudha	
1989	Narasimha		
1989	Jayabheri	Swapna	
1989	Gagana	Meena	
1989	Avane Nanna Ganda	Vanitha	
1989	Ananthara		
1990	Utkarsha	Sunita	
1990	Prathama Ushakirana		
1990	Nigooda Rahasya	Rohini	
1990	Neene Nanna Jeeva		
1990	Golmaal Radhakrishna	Sandhya	
1990	Chapala Chennigaraya	Sangeetha	
1990	Anantha Prema		
1991	Veerappan		
1991	Punda Prachanda		
1991	Mathru Bhagya		
1991	Kala Chakra		
1991	Golmal Part 2	Sandhya	
1992	Entede Bhanta	Ganga	
1992	Obbarigintha Obbaru		
1992	Mannina Doni	Sharmila	
1992	Gharshane		
1993	Vaishaka dinagalu		
1993	Bhagavan Sri Saibaba	Shachi Devi	
1993	Yarigu Helbedi	Champa	
1994	Gold Medal	Lakshmi	
1994	Chamathkara		
1994	Apoorva Samsara		
1995	Kona Eedaithe		
1995	Beladingala Baale	Rajasulochana	
1997	Nagamandala	Chelvi	
2000	Preethse	Poonam	
2001	Chitte		
2001	Asura		
2002	Thuntata		
2002	Majestic		
2002	Joot		
2002	Ekangi		
2003	Ondagona Baa		
2003	Ananda		
2004	Monalisa		Cameo
2005	Thunta		
2005	Karnana Sampatthu		
2005	Yashwanth		
2006	Shubham		
2006	Mata		
2007	Ganesha		
2007	Nali Naliyutha		
2008	Baa Bega Chandamama		
2008	Akasha Gange		
2008	Shivani		
2008	Bindaas		
2009	Nanda		
2011	College College		
2011	Hudugaru		

=== Television ===
- Maneyondu Mooru Baagilu (2003–2010)...Asha
- Brahma Gantu (2018–2021)...Revathi
- Sangarsha (2020–2022)...Byradevi
- Yediyuru Shree Siddhalingeshwara (2022–2023)...Durjara
- Amruthadhaare (2023–present)...Shakuntala
- Antarapata (2023–2024)...Shivani
