= Puriyada Pudir =

1990 film by K. S. Ravikumar

- Poster
- Directed by: K. S. Ravikumar
- Screenplay by: K. S. Ravikumar
- Story by: Sunil Kumar Desai
- Produced by: R. B. Choudary; R. Mohan
- Starring: Rahman; Raghuvaran; Sarathkumar; Anand Babu; Rekha; Sithara
- Cinematography: A. Haribabu
- Edited by: K. Thanikachalam
- Music by: S. A. Rajkumar
- Production company: Super Good Films
- Release date: 7 September 1990
- Running time: 127 minutes
- Country: India
- Language: Tamil
- Budget: ₹29 lakh

Puriyada Pudir (transl. Incomprehensive Puzzle) is a 1990 Indian Tamil-language mystery thriller film written and directed by K. S. Ravikumar in his directorial debut. It is a remake of the 1989 Kannada film Tarka which was based on Agatha Christie's 1958 play, The Unexpected Guest. The film, produced by R. B. Choudary, stars Rahman, Raghuvaran, Sarathkumar, Anand Babu, Rekha and Sithara. It was released on 7 September 1990.

== Plot ==
Raghu (a prisoner), fakes a fight with a fellow inmate (K. S. Ravikumar) to trick the security and escapes from prison.

He hides in a bungalow to escape from the chasing police. Luckily, the bungalow belongs to his college friend Geetha. He confesses to Geetha that he is a convict on death row. Geetha assures Raghu that her husband has gone to Calcutta and there is no one else in the house. Suddenly the doorbell rings and Raghu tries to hide in a wardrobe and is shocked to see a dead body fall out. Geetha, however, seems calm and hides Raghu and the dead body inside the same wardrobe and answers the door. A policeman informs Geetha that the flight that Chakravarthi took to Calcutta earlier that day crashed and there are no survivors. After the police leave, Raghu asks Geetha who that dead person was, and she says that was her husband and she killed him. They dispose the dead body in a well in her dilapidated estate in the outskirts of the city.

Geetha reveals her past to Raghu. Chakravarthi was a rich business man and a friend of her brother. However he was apparently a sadist who always doubted Geetha's fidelity. Babu is a disco dancer and a very good friend of Geetha. Chakravarthi suspects Babu and Geetha are having an affair and tortures her verbally and physically. One day, Chakravarthi decides to go on a business trip to Calcutta and Geetha invites Babu over to her house to discuss how to treat Chakravarthi's mental illness. However, Chakravarthi cancels his trip and returns home and is enraged seeing Babu in his house. Babu leaves the house, planning to come back with the police. Chakravathi then tries to hurt her, and Geetha says she had to kill him in self defense.

Raghu is reminded of his girlfriend and seems to grieve for her. Geetha's friends and relatives who all think Chakravarthi died in the plane crash, visit Geetha to console her. Raghu leaves the house through the back door and is spotted bu a nosy neighbor. But he escapes and returns as Charavarthi's family friend. Meanwhile, Babu wakes up in a hospital with visions of an accident. He calls Geetha's home and Raghu answers. Raghu says he knows about everything that happened the previous day, and asks Babu him to stay put in the hospital. As he leaves the house hurriedly, a mysterious man seems to be noticing all the happenings. Raghu visits Babu in the hospital and asks him not to reveal that Chakravarthi didn't travel in the ill-fated plane. Police later visit Babu in the hospital to ask about his accident, and Babu concocts a different story. The patient in the next bed seems to noticing all this.

Raghu tells Geetha about meeting Babu. He says he has to leave the house to accomplish a mission for which he escaped from jail. But agrees to stay with Geetha because she is too scared to live alone. One day, Geetha gets a phone call from a stranger mentioning about her and Raghu's involvement in disposing Chakravarthi's body in their estate. The blackmailer asks Geetha for money as ransom. Geetha and Raghu suspect that Babu could be the blackmailer as he is only one who is aware that Chakravarthi did not take the flight to Kolkata. Geetha now reveals that she actually did not kill Chakravarthi. She was in fact hiding in her bedroom after Babu left. When she came down after a few minutes, she saw Chakravarthi dead and assumed Babu had killed him. She then decided to take the blame because Babu did this to save her.

The mysterious man seems to be surveilling Geetha and Raghu. Raghu fights him, but the man escapes. Later, Geetha follows the blackmailer's instructions and takes the money to a hotel. Babu is the dancer in that hotel, strengthening her suspicion. The mysterious man is also at the hotel. A random person stabbed to death at the hotel and the blackmailer backs out, suggesting an alternate location. Raghu and Geetha go to the alternate location to leave the money. The black mailer picks up the money, but police arrive at the location and arrest him – who happens to be the policeman who came to Geetha's house to inform her about the plane crash. It is revealed that the mysterious man is crime branch inspector Sarath, who has been investigating the case. Sarath had Geetha's telephone tapped and learned about the stranger threatening her for money. Upon investigation, the policeman reveals that he spotted Raghu and Geetha in the city outskirts when they were disposing Chakravarthi's dead body and decided to extract money by threatening Geetha using this opportunity. Sarath arrests Babu, Geetha and Raghu.

Police torture Babu to confess to killing Chakravarthi. Unable to watch this, Raghu reveals the truth. Apparently, his girlfriend Sindhu was employed in Chakravarthi's company. Chakravarthi and 2 of his friends sexually assaulted Sindhu, and when Raghu tried to fight them, Chakravarthi fatally stabbed Sindhu. Raghu gets framed for the murder and gets sentenced to death. Raghu escaped from prison and killed Chakravarthi, but shocked to see Geetha take the blame and played along. He also confesses to killing one of Chakravarthi's friends who molested Sindhu - the random man in the hotel.

Raghu then mentions he has one more job to do, jumps out of the window and escapes.

== Cast ==
- Rahman as Raghu
- Raghuvaran as Chakravarthi
- Anand Babu as Babu
- Sarathkumar as Inspector Sarath
- Rekha as Geetha
- Sithara as Sindhu
- Delhi Ganesh as Police Officer
- Kumarimuthu as Mark, Geetha's neighbor
- K. R. Indira Devi as Kutti Amma, Geetha's cook

The uncredited cast includes:

- Srikanth as Venkatraman, Geetha's brother
- V. Gopalakrishnan as Chakravarthi's father
- K. S. Ravikumar as fellow prisoner

== Production ==
The producer R. B. Choudary had remade the Kannada film Tarka (1989), based on Agatha Christie's 1958 play, The Unexpected Guest in Malayalam as Chodhyam; however, the remake remained unreleased, as he was not happy with the final cut. He later decided to remake Tarka in Tamil, and asked K. S. Ravikumar, then an assistant under Vikraman, to write the screenplay. Ravikumar completed the screenplay within a week, and later realised that Choudary had appointed him as the director. The film, Puriyada Pudir, thus marked Ravikumar's directorial debut. R. Sarathkumar, who acted in the film, wore a belt around his neck while filming due to an accident he had before production began. The film was planned to be filmed in a 30-day schedule, at the rate of ₹1 lakh (equivalent to ₹11 lakh or US$11,000 in 2026) per day, which would bring the entire budget to ₹30 lakh (equivalent to ₹3.2 crore or US$340,000 in 2026). Ravikumar finished the entire film in 29 days, saving the producer a lakh.

== Soundtrack ==
The music was composed by S. A. Rajkumar.

Song	Singers	Lyrics
"Do Do Ri Ri"	S. P. Balasubrahmanyam	S. A. Rajkumar
"Kannoram Gangai"	Swarnalatha	S. A. Rajkumar
"Kannoram Gangai"	S. A. Rajkumar	S. A. Rajkumar
"Oor Iravil Kaatru"	K. J. Yesudas, P. Susheela	Vaali
"Vishayam Poga Poga"	Mano, Anitha Suresh	Vaali

== Release and reception ==
Puriyada Pudir was released on 7 September 1990. On 21 September, N. Krishnaswamy of The Indian Express wrote, "Puriyaadha Pudhir is a murder thriller that is interesting, and well made from Kodambakkam standards". Kalki appreciated Ravikumar for making his debut with a thriller. The critic felt despite filming a story which resembles pocket novel, the director's hard work is visible throughout the film. The film underperformed at the box office, and Ravikumar later opted against directing offbeat, experimental films; instead he went on to identify with mainstream, populist films. Sarathkumar went on to star in various other films directed by Ravikumar, including his next Cheran Pandian (1991) and Nattamai (1994).

== Bibliography ==
- Aldridge, Mark (2016). Agatha Christie on Screen. Springer. ISBN 978-1-349-67695-8.
