= Panchakshara Gawai =

Musician (1892–1944)

- Born: Panchakshara Gawai; 2 February 1892
- Died: 11 June 1944 (aged 52)

Panchakshara Gawai (2 February 1892 – 11 June 1944) was a blind singer from Gadag, a town in North Karnataka, India. Also known as 'Ganayogi Panchakshara Gavai'. He was born at Kadashettihalli in Hangal Taluk, Karnataka. The Kannada film Sangeetha Sagara Ganayogi Panchakshara Gavai is based on his life.

== Life history and contributions ==
Ganayogi Pandit Panchakshara Gavayi was a Hindusthani musician and Guru from Karnataka. His birth name was Gadigeyya. Born blind, Gadigeyya and his elder brother Gurubasava both had melodious voice and Musical talent. They were able to play many instruments. Pleased by their Musical abilities, Sri Kumara Swamiji of Hanagal came forward to arrange proper Musical training for them. A Musician from Tanjaore taught Carnatic Music to these children for some time.

Their next Guru was one Bheemarao, also for a short time. Then one Sri Gadigeyya of Shiralakoppa was their Guru for 8 years. When boys returned to Hanagal after Musical training, Kumara Swamiji was happy, but boys were keen to learn more.

Blind boy Gadigeyya went to Mysore to continue music studies. He learnt under Vidwan Venkataramanayya for 4 years. Gadigeyya became popular in Mysore. He then returned to Hanagal. He sang at all India Veerashaiva convention and got accolades. Kumara Swamiji gave him a new name ‘Panchakshara Gavayi’. Next, Panchakshara Gavayi started to learn Hindusthani Music from Ustad Abdul Vahid Khan, who was a famous singer of Kirana Gharana. Advanced training was under Pandit Nilakant bua alurmath from Miraj,Ramakrshnabuva Vaze and Baburao Rane.

Panchakshara Gavayi grew and became popular as an expert in both Carnatic and Hindusthani Music styles, along with Tabla. As per Kumara Swamiji’s command, he started training blind and orphan children in Music. There were more than 100 children in his mobile Music school. When Kumara Swamiji started ‘Kumareswara Krpaposhita Sangeeta – Sahitya Mahavidyalaya’ in Rona, Panchakshara Gavayi became its chief. Obeying his Guru’s wish, he remained bachelor to serve less privileged people.

He established a drama company by the name ‘Sri Kumareswara krpaposhita Sangeeta Nataka Mandali’ and started to give shows, thereby lightening the financial burden of feeding hundreds of children. A rich devotee of Gadag, Sri Basarigidada Veerappa, donated his land and built an Ashram there for Gavayi. This Ashram is the famous ‘Veereswara Punyashram’, which is now like a pilgrimage centre for Music lovers. Thousands of blind, poor boys have learnt Music here and doing their service to Music all over the country.

Many students of Panchakshara Gavayi have become famous musicians. To name a few, Pandit Basavaraj Rajguru, Pandit Puttaraja Gavayi, who lead the Ashram after his Guru, Pandit Somnath Mardur and so on.

Ganayogi Panchakshara Gavayi pledged his life for society, Music and uplifting of downtrodden. He died on 11 June 1944. ‘Gana Visharada’, ‘Gana kalanidhi’, Sangeeta Sagara’, ‘Sangeeta Samrat’, ‘Ubhaya Gayanacharya’ – these are some of the titles conferred on him by various organizations.
