= The Unexpected Guest (play) =

1958 play by Agatha Christie

- Original language: English
- Written by: Agatha Christie

Premiere
- Date: 12 August 1958
- Place: United Kingdom

The Unexpected Guest is a 1958 play by crime writer Agatha Christie.

The play opened in the West End at the Duchess Theatre on 12 August 1958 after a previous try-out at the Bristol Hippodrome. It was directed by Hubert Gregg.

== Plot summary ==
On a foggy night, Michael Starkwedder enters the home of the Warwicks through a window in the study. He finds the dead body of Richard Warwick, and finds Richard's wife, Laura, holding a gun that supposedly killed him. Michael does not believe she killed him, and she soon tells him she is innocent.

The two decide to place the blame on an enemy from the past, MacGregor, a man whose son was killed when he was run over by Richard's car while Richard was driving drunk. As the story progresses, it is revealed that Laura was having an affair due to Richard's cruel nature, and was vouching for the man she was cheating with when she claimed to have killed Richard.

== Synopsis of scenes ==
The action of the play takes place in Richard Warwick's study in South Wales near the Bristol Channel.

ACT I

- Scene 1 – An evening in November. About 11:30 pm
- Scene 2 – The following morning, About 11 am

ACT II

- Late afternoon the same day

== Reception ==
Philip Hope-Wallace of The Guardian reviewed the opening night in the issue of 13 August 1958 when he said, "The Unexpected Guest is standard Agatha Christie. It has nothing as ingenious or exciting as the court scene and double twist of Witness for the Prosecution but it kept last night's audience at the Duchess Theatre in a state of stunned uncertainty; guessing wrongly to the last. There are one or two irritating factors: an outsize red herring in the shape of what, naturally, one may not disclose; also one of those corpse's mothers who say, in so many words, "Inspector, I have not many years to live…" and embark on enormities of tedious repetition."
Mr Hope-Wallace said that the corpse was, "impeccably played with, no doubt, full assistance of the Method, by Philip Newman" and concluded, "I have known more tension and greater surprise from other of Mrs. Christie's classics but this is quite a decent specimen of her craft."

Laurence Kitchin of The Observer reviewed the play in the issue of 17 August 1958 when he said. "The corpse cools unregarded in a wheel-chair while the widow and an intruder embark on a complicated exposition. Provided you can accept such unreality and the abysmal humour, there is an ingenious display of suspects, as if lids were being taken off wells of depravity and hastily put back."

The Guardian reported that The Queen attended a performance of the play on the evening of 16 February 1959 with Lord and Lady Mountbatten. The cast were unaware that she was in the audience. It was also the night that Christopher Sandford fell ill part way through the performance and had to be replaced by his understudy after the interval.

== Credits of London production ==
Director: Hubert Gregg

Cast:

- Philip Newman as Richard Warwick
- Renée Asherson as Laura Warwick
- Nigel Stock as Michael Starkwedder
- Winifred Oughton as Miss Bennett
- Christopher Sandford as Jan Warwick
- Violet Farebrother as Mrs Warwick
- Paul Curran as Henry Angell
- Tenniel Evans as Sergeant Cadwallader
- Michael Golden as Inspector Thomas
- Roy Purcell as Julian Farrar

== Radio Play ==
Radio 4 broadcast a version of the play on 18/10/2026 as part of their Celtic Christie series.

For some reason they moved the action to Scotland.

=== Cast ===
- Michael ..... Bryan Dick
- Laura ..... Anneika Rose
- Inspector ..... Michael Nardone
- Mrs Warwick ..... Wendy Seager
- Benny ..... Gabriel Quigley
- Ian ..... Alexander Tait
- Angell ..... Reuben Joseph
- Julian ..... Richard Conlon

Abridged by Kirsty Williams

Directed by Gaynor Macfarlane

Front cover of 1958 Samuel French Ltd. Acting edition

== Publication ==
The play was first published in 1958 by Samuel French Ltd. in a paperback edition priced at six shillings. Like Black Coffee (1998) and Spider's Web (2000), the script of the play was turned into a novel by Charles Osborne. It was published in the UK by HarperCollins in 1999.

== Adaptations ==
A radio version of the play, adapted and directed by Gordon House was broadcast by the BBC on 30 May 1981.

It was adapted into a 1980 Italian television movie, L'ospite inatteso.

Many Indian films have adapted the story into several languages.

- The 1973 movie Dhund produced and directed by B. R. Chopra in Hindi language was one of the earliest adaptations. In 2012, it was remade in Marathi as Don Ghadicha Daav.
- The Kannada language adaptation of the play (with only the core plot retained) was titled Tarka and released in 1988.
  - The Kannada movie was remade in Tamil in 1990 as Puriyaadha Pudhir.
  - The Kannada movie was remade in 1997 in Hindi as Chupp.
  - Raagala 24 Gantallo, a 2019 Indian Telugu-language film, was inspired by the play.
