= Prathama Ushakirana =

- Directed by: Suresh Heblikar
- Story by: Ashok Pai
- Produced by: Manasa Arts
- Starring: Suresh Heblikar; Girish Karnad; Geetha
- Cinematography: P. Rajan
- Edited by: M. N. Swamy
- Music by: Vijaya Bhaskar
- Production company: Manasa Arts
- Release date: 1990
- Running time: 128 minutes
- Country: India
- Language: Kannada

Prathama Ushakirana (transl. The First Morning Ray) is a 1990 Indian Kannada fiction drama film directed by Suresh Heblikar, written by Ashok Pai and produced under Manasa Arts. Besides Heblikar in the lead, the film features Geetha, Girish Karnad, Pramila Joshai and Vanitha Vasu in the pivotal roles. The film's music was composed by Vijaya Bhaskar and the cinematography was by P. Rajan.

The film dealt with child psychiatry as the main theme and met with critical appraise and went on to win several awards at the Karnataka State Film Awards 1989-90 and the 38th Filmfare Awards South. Besides winning awards, the film was screened at various international film festivals.

== Cast ==
- Suresh Heblikar as Shridhar
- Geetha
- Girish Karnad Psychiatrist
- Vanitha Vasu
- Pramila Joshai Seeta
- Sumana
- Shyamala
- Nagathihalli Chandrashekar
- Mimicry Dayanand Shettru
- Shanthamma
- S. Malathi
- Baby Nisha Shenoy G
- Master Damarugendra
- Master Abhishek
- Narayana Rao

== Music ==
The soundtrack and score for the film was composed by Vijaya Bhaskar.

Track listing
No.	Title	Lyrics	Singer(s)	Length
1.	"Etthara Balu Etthara"	M. N. Vyasa Rao, Nagathihalli Chandrashekar	Rajkumar Bharathi

== Awards ==
The film won multiple awards for the year 1990.

- Karnataka State Film Awards

1989-90 :

1. Karnataka State Film Award for Third Best Film - Manasa Arts
2. Karnataka State Film Award for Best Child Actor (Male) - Master Damarugendra
- 38th Filmfare Awards South

1990:

1. Filmfare Award for Best Film - Manasa Arts
2. Filmfare Award for Best Director - Suresh Heblikar
