= ...Re =

- Film poster
- Directed by: Sunil Kumar Desai
- Written by: Sunil Kumar Desai
- Produced by: Lokesh R.
- Starring: Ramesh Aravind; Anant Nag; Harshika Poonacha; Suman; Divya Shetty Shridhar
- Cinematography: G.S. Bhaskar
- Edited by: B. S. Kemparaj
- Music by: Hamsalekha
- Production company: Sujana Creations
- Distributed by: Jayanna Films
- Release date: 4 March 2016
- Running time: 153 minutes
- Country: India
- Language: Kannada

...Re (English: If) is a 2016 Indian Kannada-language comedy film written and directed by Sunil Kumar Desai. The film has an ensemble cast consisting of veteran actors: Ramesh Aravind, Anant Nag, Master Hirannaiah, Loknath, Shivaram, Tennis Krishna, Ramesh Bhat, Vaijanath Biradar, Sharath Lohithaswa, Suman, G. K. Govinda Rao among others. Harshika Poonacha and debutant actress Suman play female leads in the film. Ananth Nag had revealed that the movie is thematically similar to Badal Sircar's play Ballabpurer Roopkatha.

== Cast ==
- Ramesh Aravind as Papanna "Papu" Rao
- Anant Nag as Narayan Rao
- Harshika Poonacha as Parvathi
- Suman as Preethi Bhat
- Ramesh Bhat as Achyuth Rao
- Master Hirannaiah as Vasudev Achar
- Loknath as Dewan Bhima Rao
- G. K. Govinda Rao as Samskrutha's father
- Srinivas Prabhu as Narayan Rao's great-grandfather
- Shivaram as Govinda Rao Sharmana "Samskrutha"
- Chi. Guru Dutt as Dr. Kuju
- Sharath Lohithaswa as Gangaraja / Shobharaj
- Vaijanath Biradar
- Divya Shetty Shridhar as Shreya
- Mahesh Nethrekar
- P. D. Sathish Chandra as ghost
- Prashanth
- Tennis Krishna as auto rickshaw driver
- Mandeep Roy as physicist
- Chidanand
- Suman Nagarkar in a cameo in song "Savi Nenapina"
- Sunil Kumar Desai as doctor (cameo)

== Production ==
Pre-production of the film started in 2013 with the title Thandana Thandanaana. It was revealed that Lokesh R. under Sujana Creations would produce the film and that it would be mostly shot in and around Bengaluru.

Ace cinematographer G. S. Bhaskar who previously worked for Hollywood technicians such as Richard Attenborough handled the camera. Veteran music director Hamsalekha was signed to score music for the film. Anant Nag stated that the film was thematically similar to Badal Sircar's play Ballabpurer Roopkatha.

In an interview with The New Indian Express, the film's director Sunil Kumar Desai said that the film revolves around the "'ifs' of our lives". Lead actor of the film Ramesh Aravind described the film as "an out of the box love story, which has deep meaning with weird characterisations". Nag also felt that the film had "serious messages" about Indian cultural heritage and Adi Shankara's Advaita philosophy.

The film was touted as a comeback film for veterans of Kannada cinema such as director Desai, composer Hamsalekha and senior artists Loknath and Shivaram. In an interview with the Times of India, Ramesh Aravind said that ...Re may seem like a film from the 70s or 80s and that the "old world charm" of the film was intentional. The film makes a sweeping criticism at the state of open defecation in India. Rangayana Raghu was initially cast in the film.

== Soundtrack ==
| No. | Song title | Singers | Lyrics |
|---|---|---|---|
| 1 | "Nanondu Bilihaale" | Badri Prasad, Hiranmayee | Hamsalekha |
| 2 | "Savi Nenapina" | Badri Prasad | Hamsalekha |

== Reception ==
A reviewer of Kannada Prabha wrote"Sunil Kumar Desai, who weaves a story that takes place almost between the four walls, goes to build a hall of speech, is not a good drama and does not show excellence technically, Sunil Kumar Desai is disappointing". Sunayana Suresh from The Times of India says "While the soundtrack from Hamsalekha could have been a tad more contemporary, that can be forgiven given the old-world charm to the entire tale. Watch this for a dose of laughter, with some intelligent witticisms as the bonus". Shyam Prasad S from Bangalore Mirror says "Ramesh Aravind delivers another good performance and seems to be growing younger. It can be safely said that Harshika Poonacha is one of the best actresses in Sandalwood".
