= Entede Bhanta =

- Directed by: D. Rajendra Babu
- Written by: Sudarshan Desai (novel)
- Screenplay by: D. Rajendra Babu
- Based on: Novel by Sudarshan Desai
- Produced by: H. N. Maruthi
- Starring: Ambareesh; Rajani; Vanitha Vasu
- Cinematography: H. G. Raju
- Edited by: K. Balu
- Music by: Hamsalekha
- Production company: Parimala Productions
- Release date: 4 February 1992
- Running time: 129 minutes
- Country: India
- Language: Kannada

Entede Bhanta is a 1992 Indian Kannada-language action drama film directed by D. Rajendra Babu and produced by H. N. Maruthi. Based on a novel by Sudarshan Desai, the film featured Ambareesh, Rajani and Vanitha Vasu. The film's music was composed by Hamsalekha and cinematography was by H. G. Raju.

== Cast ==
- Ambareesh as Bheema
- Rajani as Saraswati
- Vanitha Vasu as Ganga
- Sathyapriya
- Vajramuni
- Girija Lokesh
- Lakshman
- Kashi
- Sadashiva Brahmavar
- Ashalatha
- Krishne Gowda
- Richard Louis

== Soundtrack ==
The music of the film was composed and lyrics were written by Hamsalekha. Audio was released on Lahari Music label.

Track listing
No.	Title	Lyrics	Singer(s)	Length
1.	"Utta Batteyali"	Hamsalekha	S. P. Balasubrahmanyam & Manjula Gururaj
2.	"Yaakindu Neenu"	Hamsalekha	K. J. Yesudas & Latha Hamsalekha
3.	"Entede Bhanta"	Hamsalekha	Manjula Gururaj
4.	"Obbaninda Enoo Agadu"	Hamsalekha	S. P. Balasubrahmanyam
5.	"Hunnimeya Rathrige"	Hamsalekha	S. P. Balasubrahmanyam & Manjula Gururaj
