= Trikona (film) =

2022 Indian Kannada-language thriller drama film

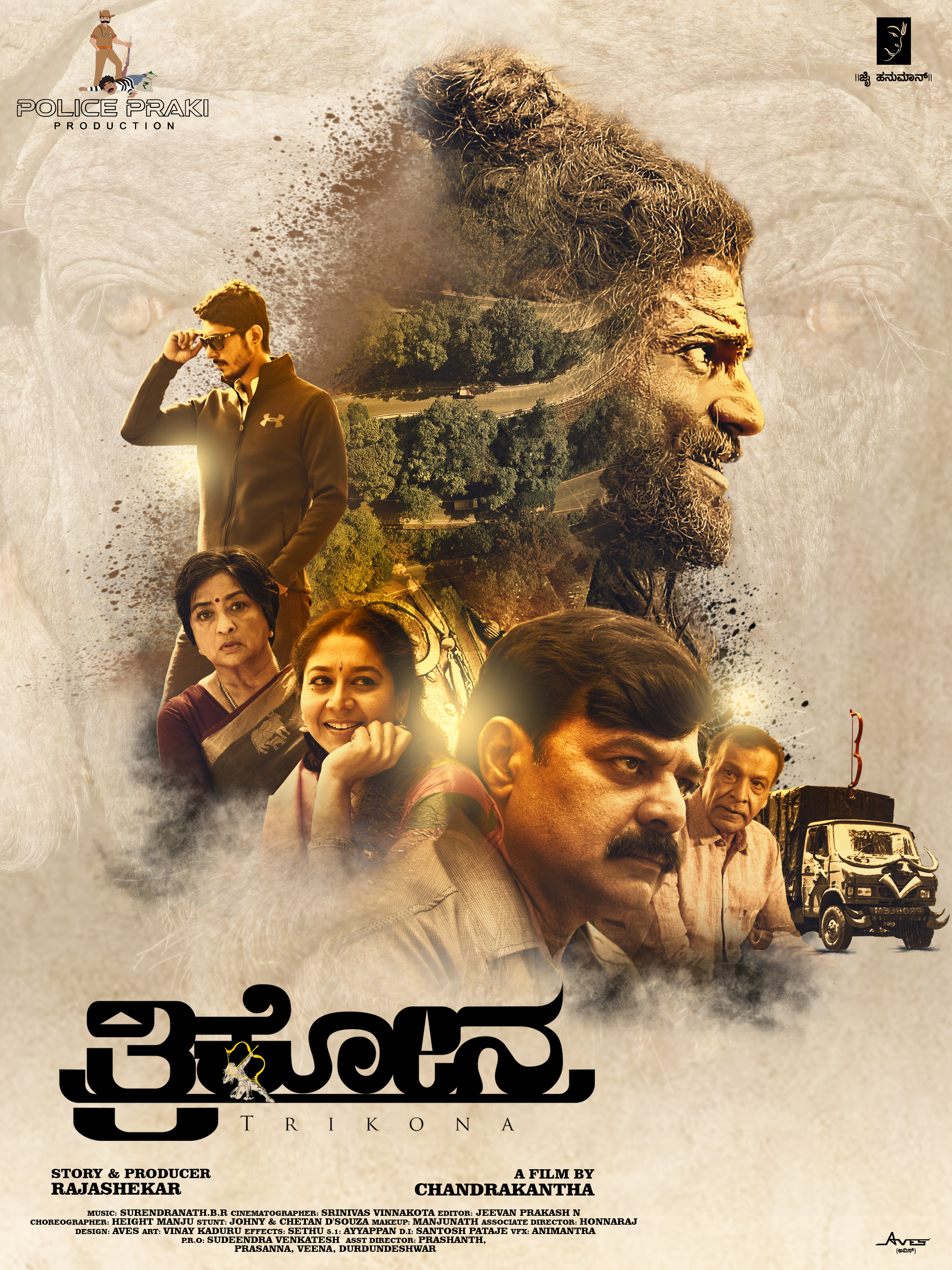
- Trikona promotional poster
- Directed by: Chandrakantha
- Story by: BR Rajashekar
- Produced by: BR Rajashekar
- Starring: Suresh Heblikar; Lakshmi; Achyuth Kumar; Sudha Rani; Sadhu Kokila; Marutesh; Rajveer
- Cinematography: Srinivas Vinnakota
- Edited by: Jeevan Prakash N
- Music by: Surendranath B R
- Release date: 8 April 2022
- Running time: 125 minutes
- Country: India
- Language: Kannada

Trikona (transl. Triangle) is a 2022 Indian Kannada film written and directed by Chandrakantha. The film is produced by BR Rajashekar Under Police Praki Production. The movie features veteran actors Suresh Heblikar, Lakshmi along with Achyuth Kumar, Sudha Rani, Sadhu Kokila, Marutesh and Rajveer in prominent roles. Surendranath B R has composed the music, Jeevan Prakash is the editor and cinematography is handled by Srinivas Vinnakota.

Trikona is a thriller, the story deals with a bunch of people and experiences with anger, patience, ego and death. The movie is set for grand release in 200 theatres in April 2022. Due to multiple Kannada movie releases on Ugadi eve and non availability of theatres, Trikona release date postponed to 8 April.

== Plot ==
The story of Trikona revolves around Nataraj (Suresh Heblikar), Kodandarama (Achyutha Kumar) and Trivikrama (Rajveer) heading towards Mangalore for different reasons. In between their journey at a remote area of the forest, all 3 cars stuck up with one problem simultaneously. From here the testing time Kaala (Marutesh) begins his play, as a valuator of patience. Nataraj (Suresh Heblikar) who is aged 65 is gifted with immense patience and even at this old age he needs to defeat one more problem, the only weapon he has is patience.

== Cast ==
- Suresh Heblikar as Nataraj
- Lakshmi as Parvati
- Achyuth Kumar as Kodandarama
- Sudha Rani as Seetha
- Sadhu Kokila as Sangliyana
- Marutesh as Kaala
- Rajveer as Trivikrama
- Rockline Sudhakar as constable
- Mandeep Roy as Annayya, police constable

== Production ==
Veteran actors Lakshmi and Suresh Heblikar unite back in Trikona after 38 years, they had last acted together in Mani Rathnam’s directorial debut Pallavi Anu Pallavi. The movie was shot over 60 days in scenic regions of Karnataka, key locations were Bengaluru, Hassan, Sakleshpur, Puttur, Hebri and Agumbe. Director Chandrakantha was excited that Trikona is the first film to be shot at Kudlu Theertha Falls located near Udupi. Trikona movie got U/A certificate for the thriller subject.

== Soundtrack ==
Trikona

Soundtrack album by Surendranath B R
- Genre: Feature film soundtrack
- Language: Kannada
- Label: A2 Music

Surendranath B R has composed music and also handled the background score. Popular Kannada music label A2 Music has acquired the audio rights.

Tracklist
No.	Title	Lyrics	Singer(s)	Length
1.	"Trikona-Song Trailer"	Chandrakantha	Sivam and Surendranath B R	1:40
2.	"Gudiyalliro Deva"	Chandrakantha	Nihal Tauro, Chetan Naik and Surendranath B R	3.52
3.	"Chal Chal Chula"	Chandrakantha	Sivam and Surendranath B R	2.25
4.	"Taggi Nadi Summane"	Chandrakantha	Shwetha Prabhu	2.04
