= H. C. Venugopal =

Indian cinematographer

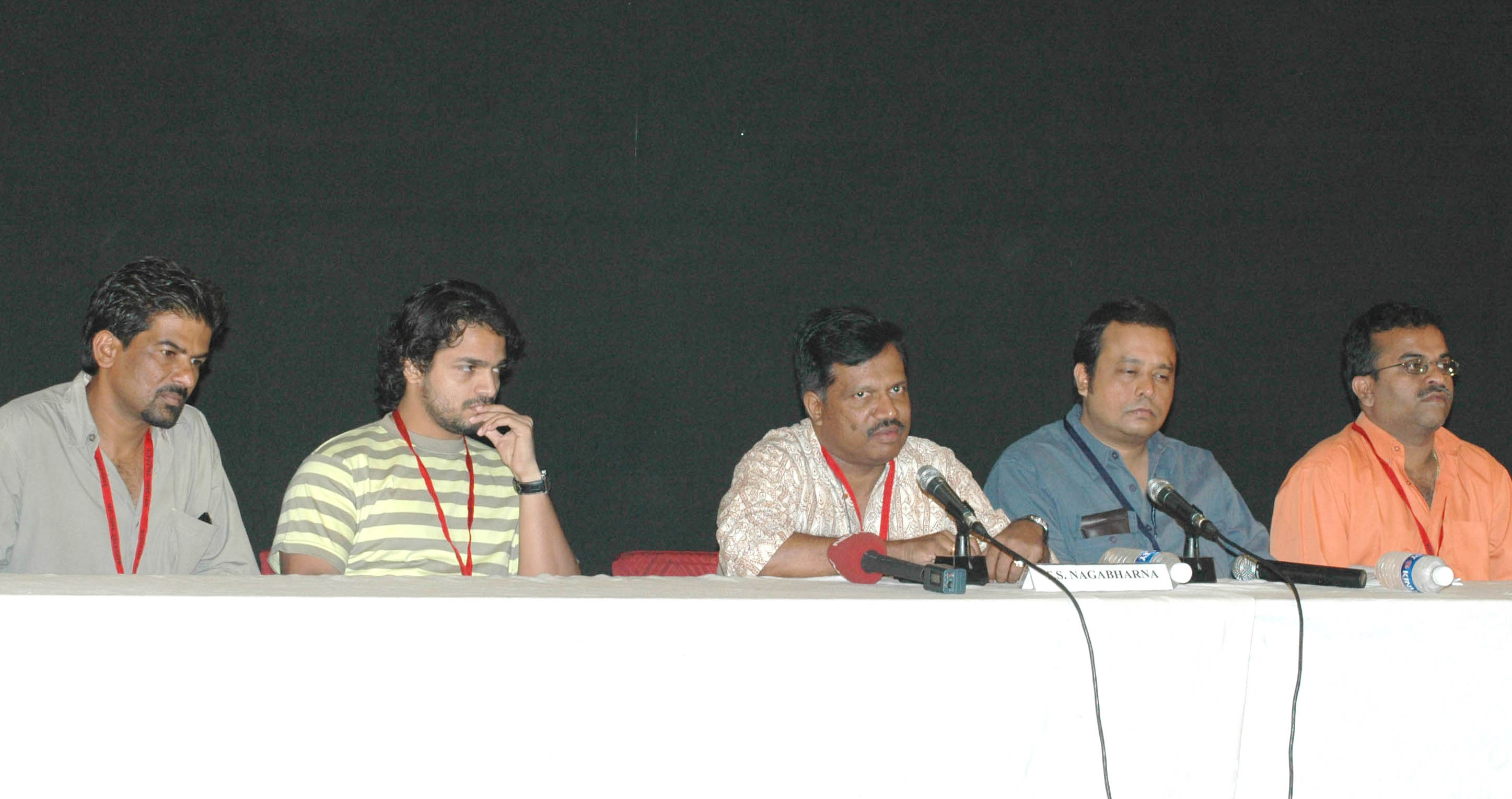
- Venugopal (left), Vijay Raghavendra (right), in IFFI (2006)
- Born: Doddaballapura Taluk, Bengaluru, India
- Other name: H. C. Venu
- Occupation: Cinematographer
- Years active: 1996 - Present
- Television: Raja Rani
- Spouse: Tara

H. C. Venugopal, known professionally as H. C. Venu, is an Indian cinematographer who mainly works in Kannada cinema, along with Tamil cinema.

== Career ==
H. C. Venugopal is a cinematographer who has predominantly worked for Kannada films. He has been active since the late 1990s, regularly collaborating for high-profile Kannada films including A (1998), Sparsha (1999), H2O (2002), Aa Dinagalu (2007), Jaggu Dada (2016) to name a few. He was also involved in the shoot of the first 3D Kannada film Katari Veera Surasundarangi (2012) .

In recent years, he has collaborated with Arjun Sarja for the bilingual films, Jaihind 2 (2014) and Prema Baraha (2018).

== Personal life ==
Venugopal married actress-politician Tara in 2005. They have a son named Shreekrishna (b. 2013) together.

== Filmography ==
- All films are in Kannada, unless mentioned otherwise.

Key
†	Denotes films that have not yet been released

Year	Film	Notes
1998	A	Debut
1999	Prathyartha	
2000	Sparsha	
2002	Dhumm	
2002	Marma	
2002	H2O	Bilingual in Kannada and Tamil
2002	Parva	
2005	Maharaja	
2006	Kallarali Hoovagi	
2006	Neenello Naanalle	
2007	Aa Dinagalu	
2007	Ugadi	
2008	Anthu Inthu Preethi Banthu	
2009	Birugaali	
2010	Modalasala	
2010	Suryakaanti	
2011	Rajadhani	
2012	Chingari	
2012	Katari Veera Surasundarangi	
2013	Nam Duniya Nam Style	
2014	Jaihind 2 Abhimanyu	Trilingual in Tamil, Telugu, and Kannada
2014	Dil Rangeela	
2015	RX Soori	
2016	Jaggu Dada	
2016	Mummy	
2016	Nagarahavu	
2018	Prema Baraha; Solli Vidava	Bilingual in Kannada and Tamil
2019	Devaki	
2020	Shivarjuna	
2023	Kaasina Sara	
2024	UI	
2025	Flirt	
2026	Balaramana Dinagalu	
