= Utkarsha =

1990 Kannada thriller film by Sunil Kumar Desai

- Directed by: Sunil Kumar Desai
- Written by: Sunil Kumar Desai
- Produced by: Sunil Kumar Desai
- Starring: Devraj; Ambareesh; Anjali Sudhakar; Vanitha Vasu
- Cinematography: P. Rajan
- Edited by: R. Janardhan
- Music by: Guna Singh
- Production company: Rachana
- Release date: 31 August 1990
- Running time: 141 minutes
- Country: India
- Language: Kannada

Utkarsha is a 1990 Indian Kannada psychological crime thriller film by Sunil Kumar Desai, starring Devraj, Ambareesh and Vanitha Vasu in the lead roles. The film was the second directorial venture of Sunil Kumar Desai after the 1989 film Tarka retaining much of the cast especially Devaraj (who played the role of a psycho in both the films) and Vanitha Vasu. Just like Tarka, Utkarsha didn't have any songs and had a thriller theme. The background music of the film was scored by Guna Singh. The film received critical appraisal for Devaraj's portrayal of the psychopathic Rajesh.

The concept of the movie is based on Jack the Ripper. The 2008 South Korean movie The Chaser which was unofficially remade in Hindi in 2011 as Murder 2, also had a similar plot line. The film was dubbed into Telugu under the same title.

== Plot ==
Rajesh Sharma, a talented artist specialising in nude paintings, is secretly a psychopath who upon seeing beautiful women meets them alone, gets them naked and slits their throat using his painting knife after making them laugh loudly. One of his victim's body is found in a vegetable lorry spearheading an investigation by Special branch Inspector Naveen who is clueless regarding the killer's motives. His second victim is one of his models, Priya, whom he met recently at a fashion show.

Meanwhile, Sunitha, a young woman meets him and develops a friendly relation with him. Rajesh treats her differently and believes her to be beautiful in a saree. He later kills Kalpana, Sunitha's friend, after the three of them have dinner together and this provides a hint to Naveen. Upon reaching his dwelling he realises that he has left his knife behind and after brief episodes of suspense and tension he manages to retrieve it and escape without Naveen noticing him. The pressure of the case mounts on the police department who give Naveen an ultimatum of ten days to catch the killer. A man is shown stalking Rajesh.

Rajesh targets his friend, Manoj's wife and proceeds to kill her when she is left alone in her home. However, Praveen, the murdered Priya's boyfriend and Anil, Sunitha's boyfriend, happen to discover a stranger breaking into the house while indulging in voyeurism. While Praveen goes to inform Naveen, Anil tries to save the woman but gets attacked by Manoj's dog. By the time Naveen arrives, Anil is left heavily injured while Manoj's wife is killed by Rajesh who escapes without anyone's notice.

A dejected Naveen goes to his superior's house so as to quit his job where he gets a vital clue from Rajesh's painting branding him as the killer. After collecting Rajesh's photo and address and confirming the identity of the killer with Anil, Naveen goes on a secret manhunt. Sunitha who is shocked upon discovering Rajesh's true identity has a vision of him slitting her throat.

Naveen breaks into Rajesh's mansion and comes across the mysterious stalker, Mahendra, who happens to be Rajesh's ex-wife, Hema's first husband. He reveals how he met Hema in Mangalore six months ago, who being sexually frustrated due to Rajesh not being involved physically with her, begins to sleep with him. However, for the past one month she has been missing and a desperate Mahendra began stalking Rajesh so as to find a clue. Naveen learns from Mahendra that Rajesh has been recently spending time with some unknown woman whose address he knows and together they travel to their house. In the meantime, Rajesh brings that girl Sheela to his house and tries to kill her only to be confronted by Sunitha who had followed them secretly. She strips and asks Rajesh to admire her but he refuses to do it since she closely resembles his mother. The story cuts to a flashback.

After parting ways with his ladylove Maya, Rajesh has difficulty coping with his wife Hema and is unable to satisfy her sexual appetite. Once he finds her cheating on him and the sound of her laughter drives him crazy causing him to make her laugh before killing her. However, this incident wounds his mind permanently and makes him a psychopath. The story cuts to the present with Rajesh beating Sunitha for trying to "manipulate" him. He tries to kill Sheila but gets stabbed by Sunitha causing him to attack her. However, before he can slit her throat he is killed by Naveen. As Naveen, Sunitha, Mahendra and Sheila walk away the camera turns to Rajesh face as he suddenly open his eyes.

== Cast ==
Cast	Role
Devaraj	Rajesh Sharma
Ambareesh	Inspector Naveen
Vanitha Vasu	Sunita
Avinash	Mahendra
Ramakrishna	Anil
K. V. Manjayya	
Praveen	
Abhilasha	
Anjali	
Akhila	
Sithara	
Anupriya	
Amrutha	
Varalakshmi	
Kamalashree	
Anjanappa	

== Awards ==
- Karnataka State Film Awards 1990-1991 for Best Editing - R. Janardhan
