= Aaganthuka =

1987 Kannadian film in India

- Directed by: Suresh Heblikar
- Written by: A. Balakrishna
- Starring: Suresh Heblikar; Vanitha Vasu; Devaraj
- Cinematography: Rajan
- Edited by: A. Subrahmanyam
- Music by: Rajeev Taranath
- Production company: Anubhava Films Pvt. Ltd.
- Release date: 12 November 1986
- Running time: 115 min
- Country: India
- Language: Kannada

Aaganthuka ( transl. Stranger) is a 1986 Indian Kannada language thriller film directed by Suresh Heblikar and written by A. Balakrishna. It was produced by Anubhava Films banner. Besides Heblikar, the film features Devaraj, Vanitha Vasu and Seetharam in pivotal roles. The music was composed by Rajeev Taranath. Sunil Kumar Desai worked as an assistant director for the film.

The film won actor Devaraj Karnataka State Best Supporting Actor award for his performance.

== Cast ==
- Suresh Heblikar as Anand
- Vanitha Vasu as Suma
- Devaraj as Chandu
- Seetharam
- Aravind
- Sudheendra
- M. Jayashree
- Goda Ramkumar
- Veeranna Kurli
- Sundaramma

== Soundtrack ==
The songs are composed and scored by Rajeev Taranath and lyrics written by M. N. Vyasa Rao.

| Sl No | Song title | Singer(s) | Lyricist |
|---|---|---|---|
| 1 | "Santhoshada Dina" | P. Susheela | M. N. Vyasa Rao |
| 2 | "Nanna Yedeyalli" | Suresh Heblikar | M. N. Vyasa Rao |
