= Vathsalya Patha =

- Directed by: A. S. R. Rao
- Screenplay by: Dr V. V. Bhat
- Story by: Vyasaraya Ballal
- Produced by: Devamma Range Gowda; A. S. N. Sharma
- Starring: Suresh Heblikar; L. V. Sharada; Devadas; Meenakshi
- Cinematography: S. Ramachandra
- Edited by: J. Stanly; P. Anand Rao
- Music by: B. V. Karanth; Guna Singh
- Production company: Raag Rang Films
- Distributed by: Raag Rang Films
- Release date: 27 December 1978
- Running time: 120 minutes
- Country: India
- Language: Kannada

Vathsalya Patha is a 1978 Indian Kannada film, directed by A. S. R. Rao and produced by Devamma Range Gowda and A. S. N. Sharma. The film stars Suresh Heblikar, L. V. Sharada, Devadas and Meenakshi in the lead roles. The film has musical score by B. V. Karanth and Guna Singh.

== Cast ==
- Suresh Heblikar
- L. V. Sharada
- Devadas
- Meenakshi
- Narasimhachar
- Dr. Sharada
- Basavaraj Vali
- Venkatesh Prasad
- B. Krishna
- Vijaya
- Puttaswamy Gowda
- J. Meera
- Rajarao
- Jayaram
- Gowrishankar
- M. S. Srinivasa Rao
- Baby Anuradha
- Baby Manjula
- Master Pradeep
