= Sangeetha Sagara Ganayogi Panchakshara Gavai =

Sangeetha Sagara Ganayogi Panchakshara Gawayi
- Directed by: Chindodi Bangaresh
- Written by: Chindodi Bangaresh
- Story by: Chindodi Bangaresh
- Produced by: Chindodi Leela
- Starring: Lokesh; Girish Karnad; Kalyan Kumar; Vijay Raghavendra
- Cinematography: B. N. Haridas
- Edited by: Suresh Urs
- Music by: Hamsalekha
- Production company: Shankar Leela Pictures
- Release date: 1 September 1995
- Running time: 140 min.
- Country: India
- Language: Kannada

Sangeetha Sagara Ganayogi Panchakshara Gavai is a 1995 Indian Kannada-language biographical film, directed by Chindodi Bangaresh and produced by Chindodi Leela. Starring Lokesh in the title role, the film also featured Girish Karnad and Vijay Raghavendra in other pivotal roles. The film is based on the life of Panchakshara Gawai (1892 - 1944), who was a blind singer from Karnataka who made a great difference to the life of many blind people in Indian society.

The film, upon release was critically acclaimed and won multiple awards both at the National and State levels. The musical score composed and written by Hamsalekha was highly acclaimed.

== Cast ==
- Lokesh as Panchakshara Gawai
  - Vijay Raghavendra as young Panchakshara Gawai
- Girish Karnad as Hanagal Kumaraswamiji
- Kalyan Kumar
- Dheerendra Gopal
- Gavai
- N. Basavaraj
- Enagi Balappa
- C. T. Savithri
- Madhuri
- Theresamma

== Soundtrack ==
The music of the film was composed by Hamsalekha. The soundtrack features 10 tracks which include a poetry compilation of Purandara Dasa and Tansen. While Hamsalekha won the National Film Award for Best Music Direction, singer S. P. Balasubrahmanyam won National Film Award for Best Male Playback Singer for the year 1995.

Track listing
No.	Title	Lyrics	Singer(s)	Length
1.	"Saavirada Sharanu"	Hamsalekha	Dr. Rajkumar	04:57
2.	"Needu Shiva"	Panchakshara Gavayi	K. S. Chithra	04:40
3.	"Manninda Kaaya"	Purandara Dasa	Shimoga Subbanna, K. S. Chithra, Sowmya Raoh	05:17
4.	"Hambala"	Hamsalekha	Sowmya Raoh	02:19
5.	"Maha Ganapathi"	Hamsalekha	Subramanya, Sowmya Raoh	00:55
6.	"Nodalaagade"	Nijaguna Shivayogi	S. P. Balasubrahmanyam	04:46
7.	"Gaanavidya Badi"	Tansen	S. P. Balasubrahmanyam, L. N. Shastry	05:00
8.	"Paramaartha Thathva"	Sarpa Bhooshana	K. J. Yesudas	03:09
9.	"Naana Embudu"	Shishunala Sharif	Mano	05:13
10.	"Umandu Ghamandu"	Tansen	S. P. Balasubrahmanyam	06:24

== Awards ==
The film has won the following awards since its release.

National Film Awards 1995

- Won – National Film Award for Best Music Direction - Hamsalekha
- Won - National Film Award for Best Male Playback Singer - S. P. Balasubrahmanyam ("Umandu Ghamandu")

Karnataka State Film Awards 1995-96

- Won – Karnataka State Film Award for First Best Film
- Won – Karnataka State Film Award for Best Music Director – Hamsalekha
- Won – Karnataka State Film Award for Best Supporting Actor – Girish Karnad
