= Taskara =

- Directed by: Chandra Sekhar
- Story by: Kiriti Rambhatla
- Produced by: Libra Media & Entertainment
- Cinematography: Rajendra P Nadh
- Music by: Rohit Kumar Naidu
- Release date: 19 December 2015
- Running time: 100 minutes
- Country: India
- Language: Telugu

Taskara is a fictional vigilante hacker superhero who appears in Indian comic books published by Fenil Comics. Created by graphic novelist Kiriti Rambhatla the character is the alias of Dr. Arjun Kumar, an influential Indian born economist who works at the IMF before turning into an underground hacker. Taskara steals from the wealthy banks and sends the stolen digital currency into poor institutions.

Taskara was adapted into live action feature film in 2015 Indian Telugu-language thriller film written by Kiriti Rambhatla. The film is directed by Chandra Sekhar, music by Rohit Kumar, and produced by Libra Media & Entertainment Motion Pictures.

The film had its premiere on 19 December 2015 in Hyderabad and theatrical release on 8 January 2016.

== Motion picture plot ==
In a futuristic London of 2062, a Financial Times journalist is researching currencies. He finds a clue about an anonymous professor of Economics and leaves to meet him in India. The journalist is looking for reasons and asks the professor three questions: why World Bank and IMF no longer exist, why and how did the paper money come to an end and the world adopted cryptocurrency and what is Counter Economic Hitmen Agency. The professor explains to the journalist.

A first narrator shows a video of Bretton Woods conference and explains how the present world financial system operates. A second narrator tells of a mysterious hacker. The Deputy Governor of Republican Bank of India discusses on an anonymous phone call about convincing the government. RAW agent Feroze and CBI Officer Mr. Ramayya meet Dr. Narayanan to warn him of a potential hacking attempt. Dr. Narayanan pays no heed and starts discussing the advanced seven layer security protocol of his bank.

He is informed someone hacked into the RBI system and a huge amount stolen. Dr. Narayanan meets Feroze in Delhi and asks for a high level delegation of members from Financial Intelligence Unit of India. They discuss what could be the potential path of the hacker. An expert says this is a master hacker. He is shown a mysterious hacker video which they record at the Central Cyber Control Room. Feroze and Ramayya move to a recruitment agency and look for clues and go to Financial Software Systems to find out aboutArjun who used to work there. Upon investigation, he threatened a colleague and find a clue to money bank on his desk. Through that clue they meet the manager of money bank. Gireesham has been cheated and his finger prints taken.

Dr Narayanan calls Feroze for the details of the hacker. They find the location of the hacker's garage, but the hacker, an ex-IMF economist Dr. Arjun Kumar, has moved to an unknown airport. Kumar posts the Lehman Brothers crash is shown delivering to people the negative effects of the present day financial system and how Quantitative Easing a method followed by Central Banks is a bad economic tool. He is also of this opinion that IMF should be more proactive in helping poor nations. Arjun has a discussion with his boss and leaves the work place to meet his girlfriend. The next morning an unknown man tries to kill Dr. Ajun and accidentally kills his girlfriend. He escapes, his parents are taken into police custody and he has been branded a murderer and a cheat. A news segment which shows Dr Narayanan giving an interview about the situation.

Dr Narayanan met his boss Christina at IMF. He finds out the Economic Hitmen tried to engage him to convince RBI to introduce a hefty amount into the Indian economy through Quantitative Easing and upon his reluctance, Dr. Narayanan has been chosen to carry it out. Understanding the implications of an additional 10 trillion rupees injection into the Indian economy, Arjun hacks into the RBI portal to divert that money through a system into the stock exchanges around this world to invest in private companies helping third world companies. He meets his ex IMF director in Brazil who then tells him she is sorry for the trouble and loss Arjun faced because of her. She mentions how she repents what she did under the pressure of Economic Hit-men at IMF and she quit for another role at a Brazilian bank. Christina offers him a job at an agency she is about to begin. Arjun finds out it is about countering the Economic hitmen and their negative impacts of countries around the world.

== Graphic novel ==
The character of Taskara created by Kiriti Rambhatla appears as a superhero vigilante hacker in the graphic novel series by the same name under Fenil Comics in India. The graphic novel was launched as a 3-part series in various Indian cities like Bangalore and Delhi. The vigilante hacker is a part of the extended superhero universe of Fenil Comics along with other characters like Fualaad, Bajrangi and Stunt Girl.

=== Personality ===
Taskara's primary character traits can be summarized as intellect, programming, financial systems and economics. His abilities are superhuman intellect and amazing computer hacking skills. He can hack into any system on the planet and is credited as one of the founding members of digital currency in comics. Before turning into an underground vigilante hacker, Taskara is well known to the world of finance and banking as Dr. Arjun Kumar.

=== Abilities ===
Taskara possesses skills in computers, systems, and networking. Over time, he learned digital techniques and can access world banking systems. His skill set includes economics, hacking, strategy, and creating high-tech equipment.

=== Technology ===
Taskara creates his own digital gadgets which help him with extraordinary circumstances. He also manufactures his own digital mask which enables him with exceptional abilities during times of combat.

== Motion picture reception ==
Taskara's first appearance was in a feature film in Indian Telugu language. Though the character for was first conceived to appear in graphic novels, the live action feature film released first in theaters.

With limited theatrical run in the Indian states of Andhra Pradesh and Telangana, Taskara then was streamed on digital platforms like YouTube and Amazon Prime where it garnered over 20 million views. The movie was dubbed into Hindi and released as Intelligent Arjun & Intelligent Hacker.

== Motion picture soundtrack ==
The score was composed by Rohit Kumar.

No.	Title	Performed by	Length
1.	"10 Trillion Hackathon"	Rohit Kumar	1:25
2.	"Financial Meltdown"	Rohit Kumar	1:41
3.	"Interrogation"	Rohit Kumar	2:14
4.	"London Blues"	Rohit Kumar	0:44
5.	"Love Theme"	Rohit Kumar	1:39
6.	"Mystery Hacker"	Rohit Kumar	1:31
7.	"Taskara Theme"	Rohit Kumar	1:45
8.	"Man on Mission"	Rohit Kumar	1:10
