= Beladingala Baale =

- DVD cover
- Directed by: Sunil Kumar Desai
- Screenplay by: Sunil Kumar Desai
- Based on: Vennello Adapilla by Yandamuri Veerendranath
- Produced by: B. S Murali
- Starring: Anant Nag; Suman Nagarkar; Ramesh Bhat
- Cinematography: P. Rajan
- Edited by: R. Janardan
- Music by: Guna Singh
- Release date: 1995
- Country: India
- Language: Kannada

Beladingala Baale (transl. Lady in the moonlight) is a 1995 Kannada-language film directed by Sunil Kumar Desai, starring Anant Nag and Suman Nagarkar. It is based on a Telugu novel titled Vennello Adapilla by Yandamuri Veerendranath which was translated into Kannada by Vamshi titled Beladingala Baale which was also serialised in Sudha, a Kannada weekly magazine. Vamshi, who translated the novel into Kannada, wrote dialogues for the movie or rather dialogues from the novel are adapted in the film without any modifications. The story revolves around Revanth (played by Ananth Nag), a chess grandmaster who is set to find out the identity of his fan, who calls him often and whom he refers to as "Beladingala Baale". Beladingala Baale gives Revanth the clues to find her out. How Revanth accomplishes his task forms the gist of the movie.

Director Desai wanted to remake the movie in Tamil with Kamal Haasan but Haasan refused to be a part of it citing that it is not possible for anyone to replicate Anant's expressions in the moments of silence. The film was blockbuster at the box office.

== Plot ==
Chess player Revanth is the only Grand-master from India and gains worldwide fame when he becomes the world champion by beating Polonski, the reigning world champion. He returns to Bangalore where he works as an assistant executive for Kanara Advertising Service. Revanth is congratulated by all his colleagues including his boss and close friend James (Ramesh Bhat). He is, however, disappointed because even though he has won an international tournament, he has absolutely no fans, very limited press coverage and no sort of recognition from the society.
While he is expressing his disappointment to James, he gets a call from a lady who claims to be his fan and is calling to congratulate him personally. However, she refuses to reveal her name, instead challenges Revanth to identify her within the next half an hour, with the only clue that her name starts with R. He takes up the challenge. James and Revanth start writing down the Hindu names starting with R. Revanth is interrupted by his boss, who asks him to conduct interviews for a batch of candidates. Revanth intelligently takes the interview where he asks all candidates to write Hindu names starting with the letter R. After ten minutes, Revanth has with him many Indian names starting with R but is still not able to identify the mystery woman. The lady disconnects the call as she gets offended by one of the names (Rasikapriya) suggested by Revanth, which was actually provided to Revanth by James.

After a couple of days, she calls again, and he apologizes for his behavior. He is mesmerized by her voice and really falls for her. He expresses his desire to meet her. She accepts only if he can find out the number where she is calling him from in the next two minutes. She gives him a puzzle, solving which he would be able to get her phone number. Revanth solves the puzzle incorrectly and gets into trouble by going to a wrong phone booth in search of the mystery woman. Revanth is frustrated by his failure and James suggests he seek the help of the telephone exchange to find out from where the calls were being made. Again, they fail at that, too, but James meets a girl who is a telephone operator with whom he has a fling.

Revanth ends up in more trouble like being arrested by the police for being in a room where a girl committed suicide, goes on to do extreme tasks like measuring the angle of Dr Ambedkar's hand in front of Vidhana Soudha (88 degrees); all to find out the phone number and address of the mystery woman. He names her "Beladingala Baale", who now gives Revanth one month to find out where she lives. In the meantime, based on the clues in a letter posted by the mysterious woman, Revanth determines that her name is Ramya.

Revanth has an upcoming tournament against Polonski, who is visiting India. However, before playing Polonski, Revanth has to win against the local chess master Prabhakar (Avinash). On the day of the match, he is accused of hypnotizing Prabhakar with a lemon in his pockets which was actually given to him by a novelist, Seetharam. Seetharam was avenging himself since Revanth had refused to write a testimony for his book. Revanth is disqualified from the game and has to resign from his job, too. But when he is about to resign, Beladingala Baale calls him, encourages him not to give up, and to fight this allegation. She suggests that he should challenge Prabhakar and six other chess players into playing against him simultaneously, where he would play blindfolded.

Revanth decides to try out her suggestion and challenges Prabhakar and six others. He successfully defeats each of them and his tarnished image is cleared with him being hailed a true champion.

Meanwhile, James tells Revanth that he will marry Sulochana (Vanitha Vasu), the telephone operator who helped them out while tapping his phone. Revanth tells Ramya over the phone that he is happy for James and expresses a desire to meet Ramya. She tells him to decode her address fast as the deadline is only four days away.

There are only a couple of days left and Revanth gets frustrated by his failure. He has a match against Polonski on the same day Ramya's deadline expires. He has to go to Delhi for the match. Ramya calls him and tells him that he can meet her right-away as she is giving a party to her friends at Ashoka hotel but only if he can arrive there in five minutes. Revanth reaches Ashoka hotel but could only see her hand decorated with jewels in a room filled with her friends. Revanth then calls up James and asks him to come to the hotel with five of his friends on bikes. James arrives there with his friends and Revanth asks them to follow Beladingala Baale's friends individually as he is confident that one of them will go to meet Ramya. Revanth's plan backfires as his friends themselves get caught by the women while following them. He has to leave for his match to Delhi and he heads to the airport.

While playing against Polonski, Revanth is constantly disturbed as he has only a few hours to decipher Ramya's address. In fact, the moves he makes in the chess game start to solve the puzzles that Beladingala Baale had given him to find her address. He messes up his chess moves but he finds her address there. He realizes from the clues given by her that her house is in JP Nagar, Bangalore. Polonski wins the match, but Revanth exclaims, "You have won this match, but I have won the match of my life". He calls James and tells him to search for posh houses in JP Nagar which are named Ramya. He also calls Sulochana and asks her to find the phone number of anyone whose name or company starts with Ramya in JP Nagar. From this he finds her number as 6137336.

As he rushes out of Bangalore airport, he is met by Ramya's father. Revanth explains to him that there are still couple of minutes for the deadline to expire and he has identified the address and phone number so he has won the bet. Ramya's father asks him to accompany him to their home. On the way home in their car, he hands a letter written by Ramya to Revanth and says that it is Ramya's last wish that her dead body should not be moved unless Revanth comes. Revanth is deeply shocked and hurt listening to this. Ramya writes in the letter that she had a rare disease and had only six months to live. She wanted to make friends and not tell anyone about her disease. Revanth is devastated by her letter. Her father invites him inside but instead he turns around and starts walking away without seeing her. On being asked, he tells James that she was in his imagination and he wants to keep her alive in his imagination, so he will not see her dead body. The film ends as he walks out of her house's gateway in spite of the rains.

== Cast ==
- Anant Nag as Revanth
- Ramesh Bhat as James
- Lokanath as Shivanand
- Shivaram as Prof. Huchuraya
- Avinash as Prabhakar
- Praveen as Praveen
- Vanitha Vasu as Rajasulochana
- Suman Nagarkar as Ramya (in Revanth's imagination)
- Shivaranjani
- Kishori Ballal as Revanth's mother
- Sheeba
- Bhavyashree Rai as Ramya's friend
- B. C. Patil as inspector of police
- Mandeep Roy as man at typewriting institute
- K. V. Manjayya as Seetharam
- Thimmaiah as Bhagwant Rao

== Soundtrack ==
Guna Singh scored the music and background score for the film.

Song title	Singers	Lyrics
"Gopala Kelo"	S. P. Balasubrahmanyam, Vani Jairam	Shamasundara Kulkarni
"Neen Yaaro Naa Ariye"	S. P. Balasubrahmanyam	Doddarange Gowda
"Nenapugala Angaladi"	Chandrika Gururaj	S M Patil
"Baraseleda Olave"	S. P. Balasubrahmanyam, Vani Jairam	Doddarange Gowda

== Awards ==
Beladingala Baale was selected for a Retrospective of Kannada Films at the Second Bangalore International Film Festival in 2007.

1995–96 Karnataka State Film Awards

- Best Film
- Best Dialogue Writer — Sunil Kumar Desai & Vamshi
- Jury's Special award — Manjula Gururaj (for voice dubbing)

43rd Filmfare Awards South

- Best Film – Kannada
- Best Director – Kannada — Sunil Kumar Desai

== Legacy ==
The film was reported in inspiring the Tamil film Kadhal Kottai (1995) although that film was inspired by Purananuru. The film 7 O' Clock was heavily inspired by this film.
