= Karnataka State Film Award for Best Sound Recording =

Indian film award

Karnataka State Film Award for Best Sound Recordist
- State award for contributions to Kannada cinema
- Awarded for: Award for adding & mixing sounds to Movie
- Sponsored by: Government of Karnataka
- Rewards: Silver Medal; ₹20,000
- First award: 1968–69
- Final award: 2010–11
- Most recent winner: Palani D. Senapathi

Highlights
- Total awarded: 45
- First winner: P. J. Lakshman

The Karnataka State Film Award for Best Sound Recording is a discontinued award among the Karnataka State Film Awards for Kannada films. It was first awarded for films of 1968-69 and discontinued after the 2010–11 Awards.

== Superlative winners ==
• A. Govindaswamy • N. Pandurangan	3 awards
• K. S. Krishnamurthy	4 awards
• S. P. Ramanathan • S. Mahendran	5 awards

== Award winners ==
The following is a complete list of award winners and the name of the films for which they won.

Year	Recipient(s)	Film
1968–69	P. J. Lakshman	Margadarshi
1969–70	P. J. Lakshman	Karulina Kare
1970–71	Srinivas	Kula Gourava
1971–72	A. Govindaswamy	Subhadra Kalyana
1972–73	Seetharam	Sankalpa
1972–73	D. Mohan Sundaram	Sankalpa
1973–74	A. Govindaswamy	Kaadu
1974–75	S. P. Ramanathan	Upasane
1975–76	K. S. Krishnamurthy	Chomana Dudi
1976–77	S. P. Ramanathan	Babruvahana
1977–78	Koteshwara Rao	Spandana
1978–79	S. P. Ramanathan	Ondanondu Kaladalli
1979–80	S. P. Ramanathan	Minchina Ota
1980–81	A. Govindaswamy	Hanthakana Sanchu
1981–82	Seetharam	Keralida Simha
1982–83	N. Pandurangan	Chalisuva Modagalu
1983–84	N. Pandurangan	Bhakta Prahlada
1984–85	N. Pandurangan	Accident
1985–86	C. D. Vishwanath	Masanada Hoovu
1986–87	C. D. Vishwanath	Malaya Marutha
1987–88	M. K. Srinivasan	Elu Suttina Kote
1988–89	K. S. Krishnamurthy	Tarka
1989–90	S. P. Ramanathan	Mane
1990-91	K. S. Krishnamurthy	Maheshwara
1991–92	Aravinda Kiggal	Mysore Mallige
1991–92	K. S. Krishnamurthy	Mysore Mallige
1992–93	R. Kannan	Angaiyalli Apsare
1993–94	R. Kannan	Nishkarsha
1994–95	V. Balachandra Menon	Aragini
1995–96	S. Mahendran	Sipayi
1996–97	S. Mahendran	Amrutha Varshini
1997–98	Murali Raysam	A
1998–99	S. Mahendran	Swasthik
1999–2000	Kodandapani	A.K.47
2000–01	S. Mahendran	Munnudi
2001–02	L. Sathish Kumar	Ekangi
2002–03	S. Mahendran	Marma
2003–04	A. R. Aravamudan	Nanjundi
2004–05	Murali Rayson	Rishi
2005–06	Johnson	Amrithadhare
2006–07	A. L. Thukaram	Mungaru Male
2007–08	N. Kumar	Accident
2008–09		Psycho
2009–10	N. Kumar	Just Maath Maathalli
2010–11	Palani D. Senapathi	Kalgejje

== See also ==
- Cinema of Karnataka
- List of Kannada-language films
