= Udgharsha =

2019 film directed by Sunil Kumar Desai

- Theatrical release poster
- Directed by: Sunil Kumar Desai
- Written by: Sunil Kumar Desai
- Produced by: Devaraj D.
- Starring: Thakur Anoop Singh; Dhansika; Tanya Hope; Kishore; Shraddha Das; Harshika Poonacha
- Edited by: B S Kemparaju
- Music by: Sanjoy Chowdhury
- Production company: D Creations
- Release date: 22 March 2019
- Running time: 130 minutes
- Country: India
- Language: Kannada

Udgharsha is a 2019 Indian Kannada- language action thriller film, written and directed by Sunil Kumar Desai. The film is produced by Devaraj under the banner D Creations and is touted to be a suspense thriller. The film stars Thakur Anoop Singh, Sai Dhanshika, Kishore, Tanya Hope, Kabir Duhan Singh, Shraddha Das and Harshika Poonacha.

The film was also dubbed in Telugu and Malayalam with the same title and in Tamil language as Uchakattam.

== Plot ==
Rashmi pays the price for capturing an incident on her mobile phone at a resort, where she had gone along with her boyfriend, Aditya. A gang leader, Dharmendra, tries to kill her and destroy the evidence. Rashmi hides herself in a car, which then happens to travel to Madikeri. Aditya, in order to follow her, has no option but to take the help of a passerby, Karishma, who ends up in the woods, and a cat-and-mouse game begins.

In parallel, Vijay Menon and his secretary Krithika went on vacation. Dharmendra assigns Krithika to kill Vijay. What happens to Rashmi, Aditya and Karishma and the reality behind the murder assigned to Krithika forms the crux of Udgharsha.

== Cast ==
- Thakur Anoop Singh as Adhitya
- Dhansika as Rashmi
- Tanya Hope as Karishma
- Kabir Duhan Singh as Dharmendra
- Kishore as Vijay Menon
- Shraddha Das as Krithika
- Harshika Poonacha
- Prabhakar
- Sravan Raghavendra
- Vamsi Krishna
- Manjunath D.
- Gym Ravi
- Manjunath Jambe

== Production ==
In an interview with New Indian Express, the director said that Udgharsha is unique as it "has only 20 minutes of dialogue, the rest of the film will contain shots, music and effects". Bollywood music director Sanjoy Chowdhury who is considered to be a specialist in background music has scored the music for the film. The first look of the film was released on social media and has generated a lot of interest. The majority of the film has been shot in Kodagu.

== Critical reception ==
Jagadish Angadi of Deccan Herald rated the film 4/5 and wrote, "With his brilliant way of narrating a murder mystery, Desai keeps the audience highly engaged for all 130 minutes of the movie." Shyam Prasad S. of Bangalore Mirror gave it 3/5 stars and wrote, "If you are adult enough to stomach some violence and game for something unusual, Udgharsha is the film for you."

Vinay Lokesh of The Times of India gave the film 3/5 stars and wrote, "There is action galore in Udgharsha, but it would seem that it is a tad too much. The narrative also lags at times and could have been maintained tight to keep audiences intrigued. The sheer number of antagonists in the film make for an interesting watch, though." A. Sharadhaa of Cinema Express gave it 3/5 stars and wrote, "With competent performances from almost all the actors, Udgharsha is an engrossing whodunnit that surely qualifies for a one-time watch."

Aravind Shwetha of The News Minute wrote, "The script translates effectively to the big screen - and although there are a few forgivable glitches, the style of storytelling is riveting, thanks to the non-linear narrative." Shashiprasad S. M. of Deccan Chronicle wrote, "Unlike Sunil Kumar Desai's previous venture, this one fails on the crucial factor, which is the suspense. [...] Watch this if you are in bad mood as it may help you ‘beat’ the frustrations."
