= Chupp =

1997 Indian Hindi-language thriller film

- Theatrical release poster
- Directed by: Ambrish Sangal
- Written by: Bashir Babbar (dialogues)
- Screenplay by: Keshav Rathod
- Story by: Keshav Rathod
- Based on: Tarka (1989)
- Produced by: Ramesh U Lakhiani, Keshav R Tolani
- Starring: Jeetendra; Om Puri; Somy Ali; Avinash Wadhavan
- Cinematography: Anil Dhanda
- Edited by: I.M. Kunnu
- Music by: Pradeep Laad
- Production company: Kay Aar Films
- Release date: 14 February 1997
- Running time: 115 minutes
- Country: India
- Language: Hindi

Chupp (transl. Silence!) is a 1997 Hindi-language thriller film, produced by Ramesh U Lakhiani, Keshav R Tolani under Kay Aar Films banner and directed by Ambrish Sangal. Starring Jeetendra, Om Puri, Somy Ali, Avinash Wadhavan and music composed by Pradeep Laad. The film was a remake of 1989 Kannada thriller Tarka which was based on Agatha Christie's play The Unexpected Guest.

== Cast ==
- Jeetendra as Rakesh Rai / Ashok
- Om Puri as Keshav Narang
- Somy Ali as Asha Narang
- Avinash Wadhavan as Avinash
- Mohan Joshi as Inspector Karve
- Dinesh Hingoo
- Fatima Sheikh
