= Chindodi Leela =

Indian politician

- Born: Leela; 1943
- Died: 21 January 2010 (aged 72–73)

Chindodi Leela (1943 – 21 January 2010) was an Indian stage and film actress, politician, and writer from Karnataka.

== Family ==
Leela was born into a family of professional theater artists in 1943 at Davangere, Karnataka. Her father Chindodi Veerappa had established the K.B.R. Drama Company in 1928. Her first play was at the age of 8 as young Siddharama in the play Shivayogi Siddharama (1951)

Over 10,000 performances were held of a play she wrote, Halli Hudugi, with which she revived her family's drama company, making it one of the biggest professional drama troupes in Karnataka.

== Career ==
Leela acted in over 32 movies, including Kittur Chennamma, Gaali Gopura, Krishnadevaraya and Sharapanjara, Puttana Kanagal's Sharapanjara, Tumbida Koda and Gaanayogi Panchakshari Gavayi. She rose to fame with her performances in Shakuntala, Lankadahana, Matanga Kanye, Hemareddy Malamma, Gunasagari, Veera Babruvahana, and Belli Bangara in subsequent year. In 2000, she toured United States and United Kingdom with the help of Government of Karnataka to promote her plays Kitturu Chennamma, Tippu Sultan, and Jagajyothi Basa- veshwara

She produced a film, Hamsalekha, about Panchakshari Gavaayi, a blind musician, which won numerous central government and state awards.She was developing the young kids in drama "HASYA KALAHA" from the school of RJS in Ravindrakalkshithra "

She ran the Karnataka Nataka Academy for more than three decades, acted in more than 20 films, and was a member of the Karnataka Legislative Council.

She head the drama company Kari Basava Rajendra (KBR) drama company. She was made the Nataka Academi chief in 1992 by then chief minister S Bangarappa

== Death ==
Leela suffered a heart attack and had undergone coronary artery bypass surgery on 18 January 2010, and died three days later, on 21 January 2010, aged 72. Leela was cremated on 23 January 2010 near Davanagere.

=== Chindodi Rangaloka ===
A small green park has been set up on the outskirts of Davangere, the first of its kind in the country, to preserve the legacy of a theatre personality. In the center of the park is a tall statue of Leela, the figurines installed across the park give a peek into the versatility of the actor, interior walls bear the pictures of famous roles played by Chindodi Leela, and the exteriors sport drawings that depict the rural life, and above all, a Ranga Dhwaj, a ceremonial flag depicting theater.

== Awards ==
- Chittakarshaka Abhinetri- 1962
- Abhinaya Samrajni- 1965
- Rangabhoomi Saraswati- 1971
- Abhinava Kitturu Channamma- 1982
- Karnataka Rajyotsava Award – 1985
- Pratibha Paripoorne- 1986
- Padma Shri – 1988
- Kala Praveene – 1992
- K V Shankare Gowda Award- 1993
- Karnataka Nataka Academy Award- 1994
- Indira Priyadarshini Award- 1995
- Karnataka State Film Award for Best Film for Sangeetha Sagara Ganayogi Panchakshara Gavai – 1995-96 (As producer)
- Abhinaya Veer Mahile – 1999
- Kala Tapaswini – 1999
- Gubbi Veeranna Award – 2002
- Akhil Bharat Sharan Sahitya Prashasti – 2003
- Katyayini Samman Award by Nadoj Pratisthan- 2003
- Shri Krishna Devaraya Award – 2005
- Sangeet Natak Akademi Award – 2006
- Keladi Channamma Award – 2008
