= Kadina Benki =

1988 film directed by Suresh Heblikar

- Directed by: Suresh Heblikar
- Screenplay by: Nagathihalli Chandrashekhar
- Based on: Kadina Benki by Na D'Souza
- Produced by: Manasa Arts
- Starring: Suresh Heblikar; Girish Karnad; Mamatha Rao; Vanitha Vasu; L S Sudhindra; Kavitha
- Cinematography: P Rajan
- Edited by: Subramanyam
- Music by: Vijaya Bhaskar
- Release date: 29 December 1987
- Running time: 107 minutes
- Country: India
- Language: Kannada

Kadina Benki ( transl. Wildfire) is a 1988 Indian Kannada erotic drama film directed by Suresh Heblikar and starring Vanitha Vasu, Heblikar, Girish Karnad and Mamta Rao. It is based on Na D'Souza's novel of the same name. The film won the National Film Award for Best Kannada Feature Film.

== Cast ==
- Suresh Heblikar
- Girish Karnad
- Mamatha Rao
- Vanitha Vasu
- L S Sudhindra
- Kavitha
