= Mana Manthana =

2017 film

- Theatrical Poster
- Directed by: Suresh Heblikar
- Written by: Suresh Heblikar
- Produced by: Suresh Heblikar
- Starring: Suresh Heblikar; Ramesh Bhat; Kiran Rajapooth; Arpitha Gowda; Sangeetha; Suman; K S Sridhar; Lakshmi Gopinath
- Music by: Ilaiyaraaja
- Release date: 17 February 2017 (India)
- Country: India
- Language: Kannada

Mana Manthana is a 2017 Indian Kannada-language psychological thriller film directed, produced, and written by Suresh Heblikar. The film features Suresh Heblikar, Ramesh Bhat, Kiran Rajapooth, Arpitha Gowda, Sangeetha, Suman, K S Sridhar, and Lakshmi Gopinath, with music composed by Ilaiyaraaja. It was released in India on 17 February 2017. Ramesh Bhat received the Best Supporting Actor award at the 2015 Karnataka State Film Awards for his performance.

== Plot ==
Mana Manthana examines mental health issues, including depression and societal pressures, through a psychological thriller narrative. The story focuses on the psychological states of its characters, particularly young people, and addresses topics such as suicide and mental instability. It follows a doctor's efforts to understand and address these challenges in contemporary India.

== Cast ==
- Suresh Heblikar
- Ramesh Bhat
- Kiran Rajapooth
- Arpitha Gowda
- Sangeetha
- Suman
- K S Sridhar
- Lakshmi Gopinath

== Production ==
The film was directed, produced, and written by Suresh Heblikar, who also plays a lead role. It was developed with an interest in psychiatry and the mental health challenges faced by youth in modern India. Music was composed by Ilaiyaraaja. Filming took place in Karnataka.

== Release ==
Mana Manthana was released in Indian theatres on 17 February 2017.

== Reception ==
Critics provided mixed review on Mana Manthana. Muralidhara Khajane, writing for The Hindu, noted its focus on mental health but stated that some scenes lacked depth. A Reviewer in Deccan Herald acknowledged its portrayal of mental struggles but criticized its pacing. GS Kumar of Times of India rated it 3 out of 5, praising Ramesh Bhat's performance and the film's narrative but noting screenplay inconsistencies. Padma Simoga in Vijaya Karnataka recognized its relevance to societal issues like suicide but described the storytelling as uneven. Ramesh Bhat won Best Supporting Actor at the 2015 Karnataka State Film Awards.
