= Marma (film) =

- Directed by: Sunil Kumar Desai
- Screenplay by: Sunil Kumar Desai
- Story by: Sunil Kumar Desai
- Produced by: S. Srinivasa Murthy; G. D. Suresh Gowda
- Starring: Prema; Anand
- Cinematography: H. C. Venu
- Edited by: R. Janardhan
- Music by: Guna Singh
- Production company: Sri Seetha Bhairaveshwara Productions
- Release date: 15 November 2002
- Running time: 126 minutes
- Country: India
- Language: Kannada

Marma (transl. Secret) is a 2002 Indian Kannada-language psychological thriller film directed by Sunil Kumar Desai. It stars Prema and Anand in the lead roles. Master Hirannaiah, Kishori Ballal, Arun Sagar, Yashwant Sardeshpande feature in supporting roles. The film presents the story of a woman who has a split personality and post traumatic stress disorder (PTSD). Desai had revealed that the plot of the movie had been culled out from an English book which he had read years before he conceptualized the film - from a short story he had read in 1982.

== Plot ==
Anand has thrown a party to celebrate his engagement to Sudha and promises to pick her up from her residence. When he fails to turn up, she drives towards his place, but gets held up midway due to a downpour and knocks on the door of a nearby house. Upon entering, she discovers a corpse of a girl. Sensing an attack, she begins to run for cover, but in the struggle, falls off the roof of the house. She loses consciousness and is taken to a hospital.

Sudha describes the experience upon returning home, but nobody believes her. She fails to recover from the harrowing experience and in one incident, starts a fight with someone in her imagination trying to kill them. Efforts from her fiancé and a psychiatrist to help her recover go in vain. The psychiatrist later believes her when she says a person on a TV program is the killer. He finds the house where Sudha was attacked and takes her there along with her family. Sudha is clear about what she saw that night: the corpse of a girl, and has the button of the girl's dress as evidence. When they arrive at the house, she does not find the corpse. Sudha discovers that the person who she believes attacked her that night is deaf and blind, and that he was a relative of the residents of that house and the girl who died had gotten engaged to him prior to her death. The man explains the reason he followed her was to describe the truth he knew to their family.

Sudha finds a tie clip in a corner of the house and identifies it as one belonging to Anand. When she goes to recover it at the house, she encounters Anand, who is there to retrieve it. She proceeds to confront him and he confesses to committing the murder. In a flashback sequence, it is revealed that as Anand is hurrying through the rain to pick up Sudha, he hits and kills a young boy. A young girl notices him burying the boy's corpse and he proceeds to kill her too. Anand then explains that it was he that took Sudha to the hospital before disposing the girl's corpse. Following the confession, he attempts to kill her, but ends up killing himself. After everything seems to have been resolved, it is revealed that Maya, a friend of Sudha's, who had been a frequent visitor at her residence, is only a figment of her imagination. Sudha had been hallucinating about Maya since her childhood and has made up her whole life story including Maya having a daughter who also accompanies her during the visits. The psychiatrist explains that Sudha has a positive mind which includes positive characters like Maya and a negative mind, where she has placed Prashanth. When Sudha gets home, she sees Anand in her room and lets out a scream.

== Cast ==
- Prema as Sudha
- Anand as Anand
- Shivaraj
- Arun Sagar as Prashanth
- Master Hirannaiah
- Kishori Ballal
- Yashwant Sardeshpande
- Khadar
- Vaishnavi
- G. V. Sharada
- Hemashree
- Shringar Nagaraj
- K. V. Manjayya

== Reception ==
The reviewer for Deccan Herald felt that the "film runs on a wafer-thin plot and a repeatedly screenplay-oriented theme." However, he felt that film was "[w]atchable" and that the editing was "slick". Of the acting performances, he wrote, "Prema has come up with a superlative performance as the troubled woman. Debutant Anand is promising." Viggy.com in its review wrote, "Desai keeps you in suspense till the end of the film with the cinematography of H.C. Venu. Prema's performance is excellent. Hats off to Prema. Arun Sagar too does to justice to his role. Newcomer Anand is promising. Background score by Gunasingh is little too loud."
