= Nishkarsha =

- VCD cover
- Directed by: Sunil Kumar Desai
- Screenplay by: Sunil Kumar Desai
- Story by: L. R. Ranganath rao
- Produced by: Doddagowda C. Patil; G. M. Jayadevappa
- Starring: Vishnuvardhan; Anant Nag; B. C. Patil
- Cinematography: P. Rajan
- Edited by: Janardhan R.
- Music by: Gunasingh
- Production company: Srushti Films
- Release date: 22 December 1993
- Running time: 146 minutes
- Country: India
- Language: Kannada

Nishkarsha ( transl. Definite Decision) is a 1993 Indian Kannada-language heist thriller film directed by Sunil Kumar Desai, starring Vishnuvardhan, Anant Nag and B. C. Patil. The story revolves around a bank robbery where terrorists become trapped with the hostages. It also explores the many travails of the police commissioner and anti-terrorist squad commandos to free the hostages and reign in the terrorists. The film was hailed as a one-of-a-kind in Kannada cinema with its realistic plot elements and that a single location used for most parts of filming.

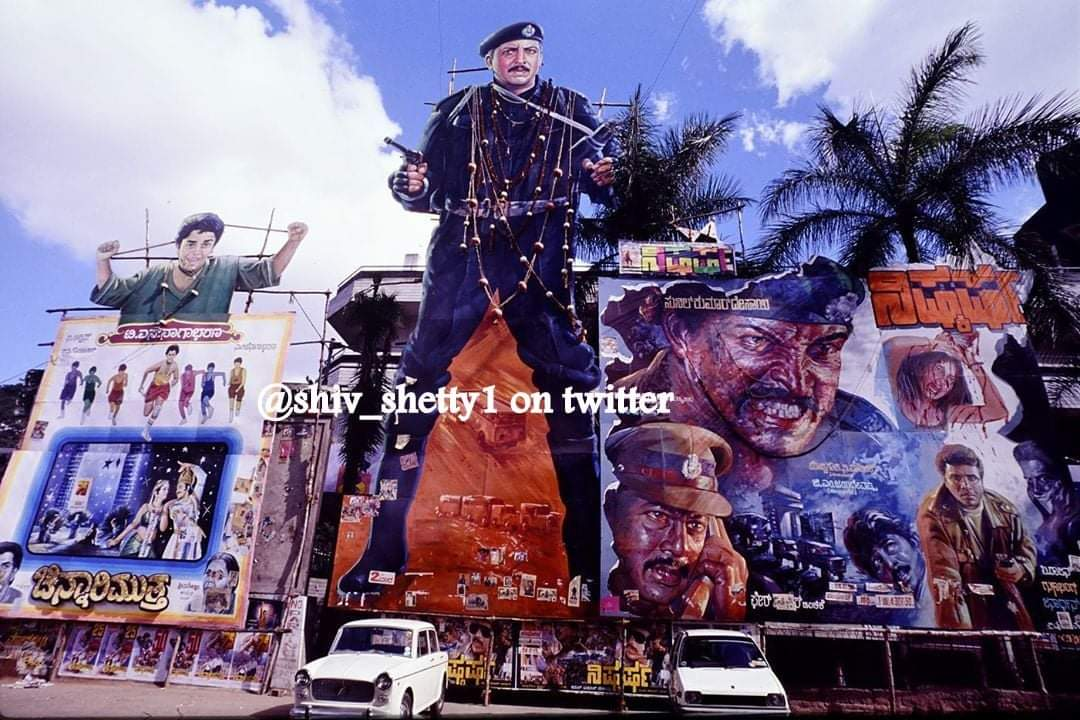
Nishkarsha cutout in Santosh theatre

The film won three awards at the 1993–94 Karnataka State Film Awards — First Best Film, Best Screenplay (Sunil Kumar Desai) and Best Sound Recording (R. Kannan). The movie was partially inspired by L R Ranganath Rao's novel Aa Ombattu Gantegalu and was conceptualized on Die Hard. The film was re-released in Kannada with DTS cinemascope on 20 September 2019.

== Plot ==
The story opens with the kidnapping of an architect (Avinash) at night. He is taken away to a secluded location where he is tortured by unknown assailants for information regarding the structural details of a bank that he helped build. When the torture reaches excruciating levels, the architect gives in and shares the confidential details of the security alarms and safety devices in the bank. It is shown that the leader of the group called Devraj (B. C. Patil) is a terrorist and will stop at nothing to get the bank's money to further his group's operations. It is also shown that he commands a strong team of at least 20 deadly terrorists.

The following morning, the scene opens at Bangalore's Manipal center, the place of the bank that Dev and his associates have planned to rob. It is a normal day, the staff slowly trickle in, and business resumes. Meanwhile, a van that enters into the building, unloads a bunch of carton boxes marked to be delivered to the bank. The boxes are then transferred slowly to the bank premises. Unknown to the security guards, the boxes contain automatic weapons and deadly explosives, which the terrorists plan to use to take control of the bank.

Dev's team tactically disables all the security alarms and safety devices. Once the stage is set, they shoot the security guard, shut the front door, and take all the staff present as hostages. Dev and his assistant force the bank manager to open the safe. As they start looting the safe, another alarm, which Avinash had not revealed to them, goes off. Now, the terrorists find themselves trapped in the bank. No matter how hard they try to break out, they realize that they have painted themselves into a corner. The news spreads and an entire police force descends on Manipal Towers. The Police Commissioner Subhash (Ananth Nag) steps in and assesses the situation. He realizes that he does not command the requisite force to accomplish this task and requests the Chief Minister to dispatch an anti-terrorist squad immediately. The Chief Minister agrees immediately.

Commando Ajay (Vishnuvardhan) is apprised of the situation. He has been a good friend of the Police Commissioner for a long time. He quickly assembles a team and meets with the police commissioner. Commando Ajay takes charge of the operation and learns that the terrorist Dev is the brother of another terrorist who he himself had killed a few years ago. Dev, too, learns that Ajay has been enlisted to supervise this operation and demands that he be taken off the force immediately. When he doesn't oblige, Dev kills the bank manager by throwing him out of the building. The commissioner is left with no choice but to listen to the terrorist.

Soon enough, the police commissioner hatches a plot to bring back Ajay. He orders his fellow officers to bring a large number of pigeons from Shivajinagar. When the pigeons arrive, he informs Ajay of his plan, and when they start flying, Ajay replaces a lookalike commando and takes charge. Meanwhile, the hostages inside grow restless. Fearing that they will all die, they hatch their own plan and attempt a coup. It goes horribly wrong and a few of the hostages get killed. Gundanna (Ramesh Bhat) a lift mechanic, with whom Ajay is in constant touch, acts as a spy and aids Ajay in performing reconnaissance of the terrorists and their activities.

In the end, Ajay infiltrates the terrorist stronghold with the help of his trusted commando (Prakash Raj) and Gundanna. Although the commando valiantly gives up his life and Gundanna is seriously injured, Ajay frees the hostages, kills Devraj, and saves the day.

== Cast ==
- Vishnuvardhan as anti-terrorist commando Ajay Kumar
- Ananth Nag as Police Commissioner Subhash Chandra
- B.C.Patil as Devraj
- Suman Nagarkar as bank employee Suman
- Ramesh Bhat as lift mechanic Gundanna
- Prakash Raj as anti-terrorist Commando Suresh
- Avinash as bank architect Ramakrishna
- Anjana as Durga
- Indudhar as police inspector Praveen
- Thimmayya as Bank manager Vittal Pai
- Manzoor Khan as Rajendra
- Pailwan Venu
- Nanjundi Nagaraj
- Gurukiran as Baldev
- Rocket Vikram
- Mandeep Rai
- Vasanth Kunigal
- Sanketh Kashi
- Rama Murthy
- Anjanappa
- Shankar Bhat
- K. D. Venkatesh
- Nagesh Maiyya
- Jackie Shivu
- Abhinaya
- Baby Roopa
- Agantuka Nagaraj

== Production ==
B. C. Patil, who was then a policeman made his acting debut with this film portraying the antagonist after Desai was impressed with his performance as Tipu Sultan in a play. According to Desai, it was Patil who suggested the idea of a rescue drama as he wanted to show "policemen as good Samaritans". The film was completely shot at Manipal Centre at MG Road, Bangalore where office on the top floor was used for the shoot. The filming began on 12 May 1993. Desai took eight days to come up with the idea for the scene where Vishnuvardhan's idea to distract terrorists from top floor though many suggested the idea of flying balloons and smoke finally Desai went with the idea of using pigeons after seeing them on top floor. 500 pigeons were used for the scene.

== Release and reception ==
According to Patil, one of the film's producers, the film ran for 100 days "but fell short of expected revenue due to financial misconduct by the mediators I trusted".

On the re-release, The News Minute wrote "Few films from the Kannada industry can be compared to Nishkarsha. The film stuck to its premise of telling a gripping two-and-a-half-hour heist story set in central Bengaluru. The film's realistic execution set it apart from its peers and captured the imagination of young and old viewers". However Deccan Herald on its re-release, found "a below-average attempt".
