= Tarka (film) =

- Film poster
- Directed by: Sunil Kumar Desai
- Screenplay by: Sunil Kumar Desai
- Based on: The Unexpected Guest by Agatha Christie
- Produced by: Sunil Kumar Desai
- Starring: Shankar Nag; Vanitha Vasu; Devaraj
- Cinematography: P. Rajan
- Edited by: A. Subramanyam
- Music by: Guna Singh
- Production company: Rachana
- Distributed by: Sri Bharat Films
- Release date: 1989
- Running time: 132 minutes
- Country: India
- Language: Kannada

Tarka (transl. Logic) is a 1989 Indian Kannada-language mystery-thriller film, produced by Praveen and directed and written by Sunil Kumar Desai in his directorial debut which is based on Agatha Christie's 1958 play The Unexpected Guest. It is the first film noir in Kannada cinema, and the first Kannada film to be made without songs, dance, or stunt sequences. The film stars Shankar Nag, Vanitha Vasu and Devaraj. The film also features Avinash, Shivaraj and Praveen Nayak in supporting roles. The film revolves around an escaped convict who finds the body of a man in his childhood friend's house.

Inspired by B. R. Chopra's thrillers, Desai started working on a script in the late 80's. After completing the script he tried to find a producer who could produce the project, but in vain. Producers rejected the film due to its unconventional script and complete lack of commercial elements. However, eventually his friend, Praveen agreed to produce the film under the banner of Rachana. Due to financial constraints filming and post-production took almost 1.5 years to complete. The filming was handled by P. Rajan, and the background score was composed by Guna Singh. The editing of the film was done by A. Subramanyam.

Tarka was released on 1 January 1989, on New Year's Day; it received critical acclaim, primarily for Devaraj's and Vasu's performance, and was awarded two Karnataka State Film Awards for Best Screenplay and Best Sound Record. It was a commercial success, running for more than 100 days in theatres. Desai won the Filmfare Award for Best Director at the 36th Filmfare Awards South. It was remade in Tamil in 1990 as Puriyaadha Pudhir and in Hindi in 1997 as Chupp. A Malayalam remake titled Chodhyam was made in 1990 with Mohanlal in the lead role but was never released.

== Plot ==
Akshay (Shankar Nag), escapes from jail and is being chased by the police when he accidentally runs into the house of Sudha (Vanitha Vasu), a high school classmate of his. He hides in a closet when Inspector Cowry (Avinash) knocks on the door. As he hides, he finds the corpse of her husband, Rithwik Kumar (Devaraj) dumped there. The officer breaks the news to Sudha that the plane by which her husband Kumar traveled to Calcutta crashed, killing all the passengers. She appears shocked and breaks down in front of the officer. After he leaves, she reveals to Akshay that she killed her husband and confides in him. He joins her in disposing of the corpse in an abandoned well by her estate.

Sudha narrates to Akshay the reason she killed him, shown in a series of broken sequences. Kumar, who has schizophrenia is suspicious of his wife's fidelity and is unable to make love to her. He hallucinates scenes of her making love to her male friends, among whom is Shashidhar, a friend whom she meets often. Planning on catching them "red-handed", he plans a fake trip to Calcutta, and returns to his house to find them talking, the following day of his departure. Mad with rage, he attacks Sudha intending to kill her, but an accidental turn of events leading to his death, makes her believe that Shashidhar killed him. Shashidhar, in pursuit to report the matter at the police station, is hit by a police vehicle and finds himself admitted in a hospital.

At present, Akshay disguising as Harish, a friend of Kumar's, meets the mourners and appears to offer support to Sudha. Sudha receives phone calls from a person who demands a ransom from her husband's property that she inherits following his death, blackmailing her that he would otherwise report the matter of her killing and disposing of Kumar's corpse, to the police. The blackmailer directs her to come to a spot with an amount of ₹ 2 lakhs. Pursued by the police, the blackmailer, who emerges to be Cowry, is arrested. Cowry reveals that he saw Sudha and Akshay throwing Kumar's corpse in the estate well and decided to blackmail Sudha. Following a further investigation at the crime scene the investigating officer gets to know that the weapon used in the murder was a knife. Using this as evidence, he reveals the murderer as Akshay, who then confesses to his crime. Akshay narrates a story of his girlfriend Smitha, who was murdered by Kumar, after she humiliated him due to his irrational behaviour and blames Akshay for the murder. A few days later, Akshay escapes from the prison and walks straight into Kumar's house where he kills him, thus avenging Smitha's death, Akshay seizes the opportunity of the ensuing drama in the house between Kumar and Sudha and slits Kumar's throat unseen by Sudha. Akshay gets arrested along with Sudha and is brought to jail by a police vehicle. Akshay tackles the cops, escaping again.

== Cast ==
- Shankar Nag as Akshay / Harish
- Vanitha Vasu as Sudha
- Devaraj as Ritwik Kumar
- Avinash as Inspector Cowry
- Shivaraj
- Vijayaranjini in a cameo appearance
- Uday in a cameo appearance
- Shashidhar Bhat
- Praveen Nayak
- Sudhakar Pai
- Kumar
- Tennis Krishna
- M. S. L. Murthy
- Nagendra
- Srikanth
- Sampath Kumar

== Production ==
Those days, family-orientated films featuring Rajkumar and Vishnuvardhan ruled the box office. And, here I was saying my film will have three grey characters, will be shot in a house, without action scenes, songs, hero or villain. People looked at me as if I had lost my mind. Finally they would ask, ‘will there be at least a little comedy?’ When I said no, they would not invest.”

— Sunil Kumar Desai, in 2019

Sunil Kumar Desai decided to write a script for his directorial debut. In an interview with The Hindu he said, "I wanted to make a thriller. I had watched all of B. R. Chopra’s thrillers including Gumrah, Kanoon and Ittefaq... I loved his films and started writing the story of Tarka ." After completing the script Desai tried to get funding for the project, but in vain. The major reason of the rejection was due to the parallel cinema tone to the script's subject matter, but finally his close friend Praveen agreed to produce the film.

Then, Desai approached Shankar Nag, who was popular as the Karate King at the time through a friend. Desai approached Nag as he had earlier starred in other offbeat films like Minchina Ota (1980) and Accident (1985). Nag asked Desai to narrate the story of Takra in five minutes, which he did and Nag came on board. Nag was given an advance of ₹10,000 and was paid ₹50,000 in total. About the film's filming Desai would say, "The shoot would stop every time the money was exhausted and resume when he got a little money. “The sporadic flow of funds caused Tarka to take almost a year-and-a-half to be completed, with dubbing, re-recording and editing."

== Themes ==
The film is known for exploring mental health illness.

== Reception ==
The film was critically acclaimed and ran successfully. It was a breakthrough in Desai's career. It ran for 21 weeks in Sapna theatre, Bangalore and for 100 days in multiple centers like Mysore, Davngere and Hubli.
