= Prathyartha =

- VCD cover
- Directed by: Sunil Kumar Desai
- Written by: Sunil Kumar Desai
- Produced by: G. V. Srinivas; B. G. Manjunath
- Starring: Ramesh Aravind; Raghuvaran; Girish Karnad; Sudeep
- Cinematography: H. C. Venu
- Edited by: R. Janardhan
- Music by: Ilaiyaraaja
- Release date: 2 April 1999
- Country: India
- Language: Kannada

Prathyartha is a 1999 Kannada suspense-thriller film written and directed by Sunil Kumar Desai featuring Ramesh Aravind, Raghuvaran, Girish Karnad and Sudeep in the lead roles. The film features background score composed by Ilaiyaraaja. The concept of this movie is based on the 1995 movie Nick of Time.

== Cast ==
- Ramesh Aravind as Akshay / Robert
- Raghuvaran as Rakesh
- Girish Karnad as Home Minister of India Sheshanag Dixit
- Sudeep as Sudeep
- Avinash as Karthik, Home Minister's P.A.
- Shivaram as Madhav
- Kashi as Maruthi
- Tharakesh Patel
- K. D. Venkatesh
- Vinayak Joshi as Akshay (not the protagonist)
- Sunil Kumar Desai as visitor in Lalitha Mahal Palace (special appearance)

== Production ==
The film was shot around the Lalith Mahal Palace in Mysore. Sivaji Ganesan was the original choice for the role of Prime Minister. This was Ramesh Aravind's 50th film as actor.

== Awards ==
Karnataka State Film Awards:

- Best Screenplay - Won - Sunil Kumar Desai (1998–99)
