= Karnataka State Film Award for Best Screenplay =

Indian state film award

- State award for contributions to Kannada cinema
- Awarded for: Award for creating well-woven screenplay
- Sponsored by: Government of Karnataka
- Rewards: Silver Medal; ₹ 20,000
- First award: 1967-68
- Final award: 2021
- Most recent winner: Raghu K M

Highlights
- Total awarded: 51
- First winner: S. R. Puttanna Kanagal

Karnataka State Film Award for Best Screenplay is a film award of the Indian state of Karnataka given during the annual Karnataka State Film Awards. The award honors Kannada-language films.

== Superlative winners ==
• Sunil Kumar Desai	3 Awards
• Girish Kasaravalli	4 Awards
• Puttanna Kanagal	6 Awards

== Award winners ==
The first recipient of the award was S. R. Puttanna Kanagal. For six times, multiple writers were awarded for their work in a single film; Shankar Nag and Mariam Jetpurwala for Minchina Ota (1979), Singeetam Srinivasa Rao and Chi. Udayashankar for Bhagyada Lakshmi Baramma (1985, first time) and Anand (1986, second time), S. V. Rajendra Singh Babu and Ramani for Kothigalu Saar Kothigalu (2001), Prakash and M. S. Abhishek for Rishi (2004), and Shashank and Raghu Kovi for Krishna Leela (2015).

The following is a complete list of award winners and the films for which they won.

Year	Winner	Film	Reference
2021	Raghu K. M.	Doddahatti Boregowda	
2020	Raghavendra Kumar	Chandni Bar	
2019	Darling Krishna	Love Mocktail	
2018	P. Sheshadri	Mookajjiya Kanasugalu	
2017	Venkat Bharadwaj	Kempiruve	
2016	Arvind Sastry	Kahi	
2015	Shashank	Krishna Leela	
2015	Raghu Kovi	Krishna Leela	
2014	P. Sheshadri	Vidaaya	
2013	Jayatheertha	Tony	
2012	K. Y. Narayanaswamy	Kalavu	
2011	Ravindra H. P. Das	I Am Sorry Mathe Banni Preethsona	
2010-11	Agni Shridhar	Thamassu	
2009-10	Guruprasad	Eddelu Manjunatha	
2008-09	Duniya Soori	Junglee	
2007-08	Girish Kasaravalli	Gulabi Talkies	
2006-07	Duniya Soori	Duniya	
2005-06	Prem	Jogi	
2004-05	Prakash	Rishi	
2004-05	M. S. Abhishek	Rishi	
2003-04	Kavitha Lankesh	Preethi Prema Pranaya	
2002-03	Kavitha Lankesh	Bimba	
2001-02	S. V. Rajendra Singh Babu	Kothigalu Saar Kothigalu	
2001-02	Ramani	Kothigalu Saar Kothigalu	
2000-01	Ashok Patil	Shaapa	
1999-2000	D. Rajendra Babu	Habba	
1998-99	Sunil Kumar Desai	Prathyartha	
1997-98	D. Rajendra Babu	Jodi Hakki	
1996-97	Dinesh Baboo	Amrutha Varshini	
1995-96	Upendra	Om	
1994-95	H. S. Rajashekar	Curfew	
1993-94	Sunil Kumar Desai	Nishkarsha	
1992-93	S. Surendranath	Aathanka	
1991-92	Abdul Rehman Pasha	Chukki Chandrama	
1990-91	Asrar Abid	Krama	
1989-90	Girish Kasaravalli	Mane	
1988-89	Sunil Kumar Desai	Tarka	
1987-88	T. S. Nagabharana	Aasphota	
1986-87	Singeetam Srinivasa Rao	Anand	
1986-87	Chi. Udayashankar	Anand	
1985-86	Singeetam Srinivasa Rao	Bhagyada Lakshmi Baramma	
1985-86	Chi. Udayashankar	Bhagyada Lakshmi Baramma	
1984-85	Vasanth Mokashi	Accident	
1983-84	Puttanna Kanagal	Amrutha Ghalige	
1982-83	Mani Ratnam	Pallavi Anu Pallavi	
1981-82	S. V. Rajendra Singh Babu	Antha	
1980-81	Girish Kasaravalli	Mooru Daarigalu	
1979-80	Mariyam Jetpurwala	Minchina Ota	
1979-80	Shankar Nag	Minchina Ota	
1978-79	Kashinath	Aparichita	
1977-78	Girish Kasaravalli	Ghatashraddha	
1976-77	P. Lankesh	Pallavi	
1975-76	K. Shivaram Karanth	Chomana Dudi	
1974-75	Puttanna Kanagal	Upasane	
1973-74	Siddalingaiah	Bhootayyana Maga Ayyu	
1972-73	Puttanna Kanagal	Naagarahaavu	
1971-72	Siddalingaiah	Bangaarada Manushya	
1970-71	Puttanna Kanagal	Sharapanjara	
1969-70	Puttanna Kanagal	Gejje Pooje	
1968-69	Geethapriya	Mannina Maga	
1967-68	Puttanna Kanagal	Belli Moda	

== See also ==
- Cinema of Karnataka
- List of Kannada-language films
