= Filmfare Award for Best Director – Kannada =

Indian annual film award

The Filmfare Awards for Best Director – Kannada is given by the Filmfare magazine as part of its annual Filmfare Awards South for Kannada (Sandalwood) films. The award was first given in 1972.

== Superlatives ==
Superlative	Best Director	Record
Most wins	Girish Kasaravalli; Sunil Kumar Desai; T. S. Nagabharana; Puttanna Kanagal; Girish Karnad	3

== Winners ==
Here is a complete list of the recipients and the films they won for.

Year	Director	Film	Ref
2024	Prithvi Konanur	Hadinelentu	
2023	Hemanth M. Rao	Sapta Saagaradaache Ello: Side A	
2022	Kiranraj K	777 Charlie	
2020–21	Raj B. Shetty	Garuda Gamana Vrishabha Vahana	
2019	AWARDS FUNCTION WAS SUSPENDED DUE TO COVID-19 PANDEMIC		
2018	Mansore	Nathicharami	
2017	Tarun Sudhir	Chowka	
2016	Rishab Shetty	Kirik Party	
2015	Anup Bhandari	RangiTaranga	
2014	Rakshit Shetty	Ulidavaru Kandanthe	
2013	Pawan Kumar	Lucia	
2012	Vijaya Prasad	Sidlingu	
2011	Jayathirtha	Olave Mandhara	
2010	Girish Kasaravalli	Kanasemba Kudureyaneri	
2009	Guruprasad	Eddelu Manjunatha	
2008	Shashank	Moggina Manasu	
2007	K. M. Chaitanya	Aa Dinagalu	
2006	Indrajith Lankesh	Aishwarya	
2005	Ratnaja	Nenapirali	
2004	P. Vasu	Aaptamitra	
2003	P.A. Arun Prasad	Kiccha	
2002	Girish Kasaravalli	Dweepa	
2001	Nagathihalli Chandrashekhar	Nanna Preethiya Hudugi	
2000	Sunil Kumar Desai	Sparsha	
1999	Upendra	Upendra	
1998	Girish Kasaravalli	Thaayi Saheba	
1997	T. S. Nagabharana	Nagamandala	
1996	T. S. Nagabharana	Janumada Jodi	
1995	Sunil Kumar Desai	Beladingala Baale	
1994	Rajendra Singh Babu	Mahakshathriya	
1993	Rajendra Singh Babu	Hoovu Hannu	
1992	T. S. Nagabharana	Mysore mallige	
1991	Lokesh	Bhujangayyana Dashavathara	
1990	Suresh Heblikar	Prathama Ushakirana	
1989	Sunil Kumar Desai	Tarka	
1988	Dinesh Baboo	Suprabhatha	
1987	Singeetham Srinivasa Rao	Pushpaka Vimana	
1986	K. V. Jayaram	Hosa Neeru	
1985	N. Lakshmi Narayan	Bettada Hoovu	
1984	Shankar Nag	Accident	
1983	Prema Karanth	Phaniyamma	
1982	M. S. Sathyu	Bara	
1981	Puttanna Kanagal	Ranganayaki	
1980	Shankar Nag	Minchina Ota	
1979	Puttanna Kanagal	Dharmasere	
1978	Girish Karnad	Ondanondu Kaladalli	
1977	K. S. Prakash Rao	Ganda Hendati	
1976	G. V. Iyer	Hamsa Geethe	
1975	B. V. Karanth	Chomana Dudi	
1974	Girish Karnad	Kaadu	
1973	Puttanna Kanagal	Edakallu Guddada Mele	
1972	• B. V. Karanth • Girish Karnad	Vamsha Vriksha	
