= Suresh Heblikar =

Indian filmmaker, director and actor

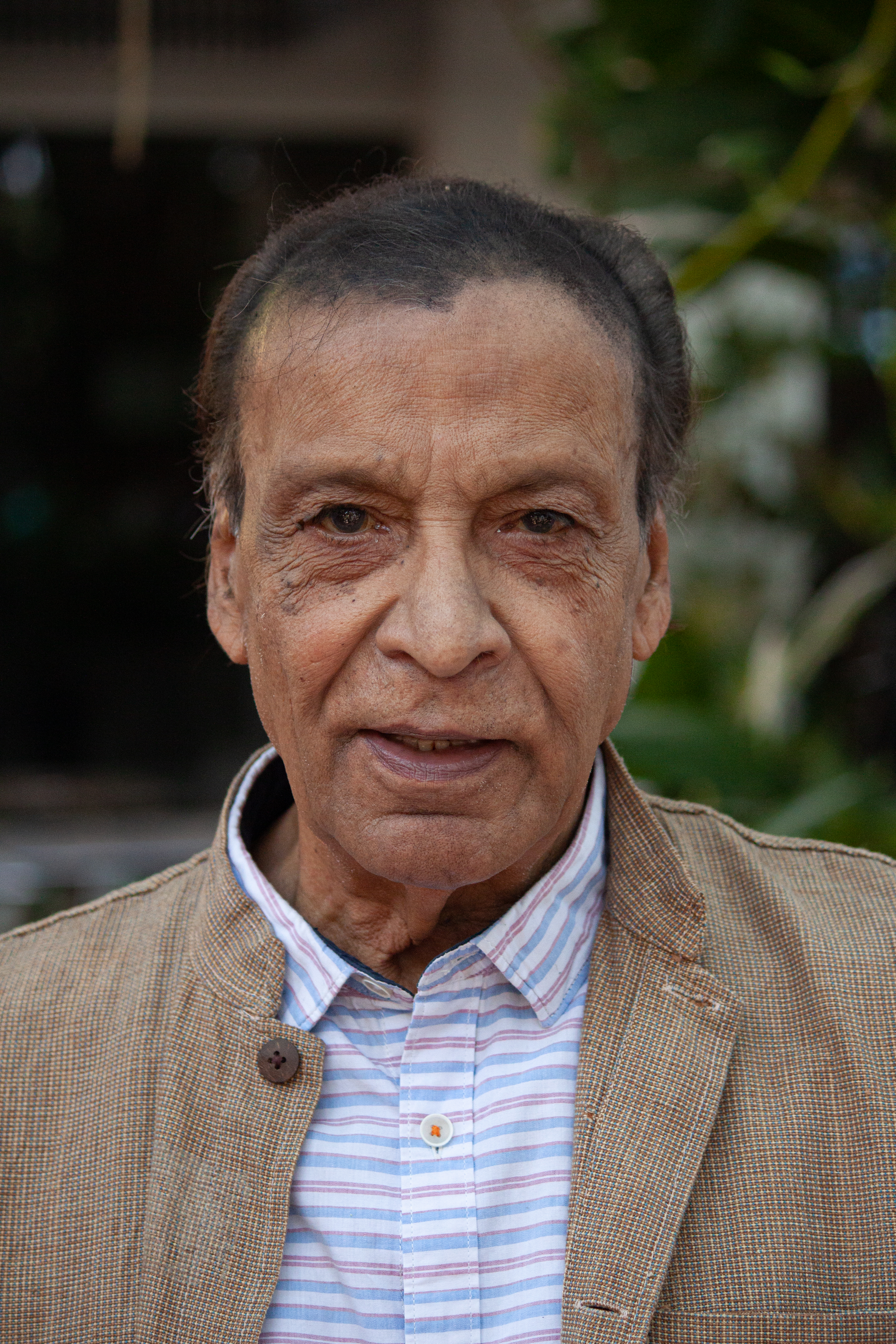
- Heblikar in 2024
- Born: Suresh Heblikar; February 22, 1948 (age 78); Dharwad, Karnataka, India
- Occupations: Actor, director, environmentalist
- Years active: 1971–present

Suresh Heblikar is an Indian Kannada filmmaker, director, and actor.

== Life ==
He is also a environmentalist, founding the Eco-Watch NGO in 1998. He has produced many movies in Kannada of which Kadina Benki won Best Director national award and Usha Kiran the Filmfare award. His films are known to have an offbeat theme where "passionate romance" is portrayed.

== Filmography ==
=== As an actor ===
Year	Title	Role	
1975	Kankana		
1977	Rishya Shrunga		
1978	Aparichita	Prakash	
1979	Khandavidheko Maamsavisheko		
1980	Vathsalya Patha		
1981	Aalemane		
1982	Amara Madhura Prema		
1982	Jyothi		
1983	Pallavi Anu Pallavi		
1983	Antaraala		Also director
1983	Maththe Vasantha		
1984	Kanoonige Saval	Deshpande	
1984	Western Ghats		
1984	Energy 1984		
1984	Smoking Tuna		
1985	Havu Yeni Aata	Ravi	
1987	Aaganthuka	Anand	Also director
1987	Kadina Benki	Rajaram	Also director
1990	Prathama Ushakirana	Sridhar	Also director; Won: Filmfare Award for Best Director - Kannada
1990	Bannada Gejje		
1993	Shhh!	Superintendent of Police	
1993	Chukki Chandrama		
1993	Golibar	Vishwanath	
1994	Chamatkara		Also director
1994	Murder		
1995	Aagatha	Francis	Also director
1996	Circle Inspector		
1999	Thaayi Saheba	Appa Saheb	
1999	Aasha Jyothi		
2000	Gupchup	Chaturvedi	
2000	Chamundi		
2000	Soorappa		
2001	Nanna Preethiya Hudugi		
2006	Care of Footpath		
2010	Mylari		
2011	Sanju Weds Geetha	Doctor	
2013	Ee Bhoomi Aa Bhanu		
2017	Mana Manthana		
2018	Birbal Trilogy Case 1: Finding Vajramuni	Hegde	
2022	Trikona	Nataraj	
2022	Guru Shishyaru	Nijaguna Shanthappa	

== See also ==
- Sunil Kumar Desai
