= Sunil Kumar Desai =

Indian film director, writer and producer

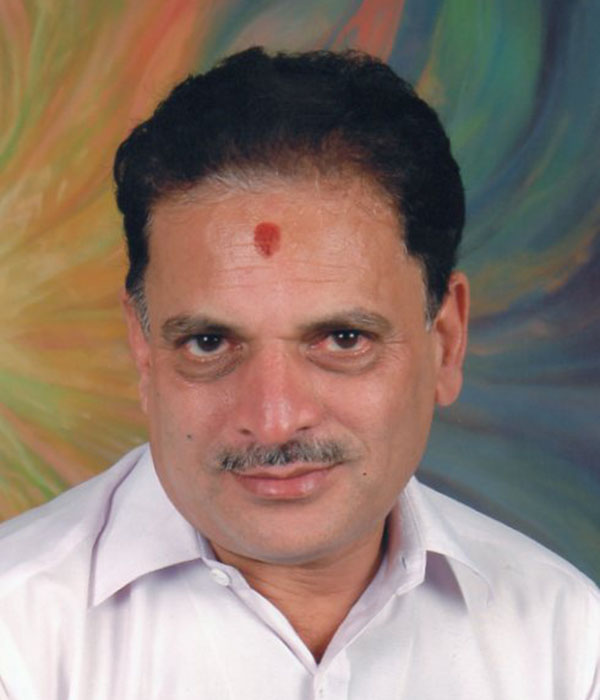
- Born: 22 November 1955 (age 70); Bijapur, Karnataka, India
- Occupations: Film director, producer and writer
- Years active: 1989–2007; 2016–present

Sunil Kumar Desai is an Indian film director, writer and producer, known for his work in Kannada cinema. In most of his films, Desai blends art and commercial cinema. He has written and directed both thrillers and romance films.

== Early life and career ==
Desai was born in Bijapur. He joined Adarsha Film Institute in Bengaluru to learn film direction but left. He worked as an assistant to Kashinath and designed the posters and title card for Anubhava (1984). He also worked for Suresh Heblikar for Aaganthuka (1986).

He made his film debut as a director with the thriller Tarka in 1989 after being inspired by B. R. Chopra's work. His subsequent films Nishkarsha, Beladingala Baale and Nammoora Mandara Hoove earned him a reputation as the most innovative and influential directors of the 1990s. For the film Ramya Chaitrakala, Jayanth Kaikini co-wrote the film.

The film Sarigama starring Prajwal Devaraj, Sunil Raoh, Naga Kiran, Tejaswini Prakash, and Nakshatra was shelved. Another one of his shelved films Thandana Thandanana was revived as ...Re (2016). After three years of absence, Udgharsha was released in 2019.

== Filmography ==
Key
†	Denotes films that have not yet been released

Year	Title	Notes
1989	Tarka	Also producer Karnataka State Film Award for Best Screenplay; Filmfare Award for Best Director – Kannada
1990	Utkarsha	Also producer
1993	Sangharsha	
1994	Nishkarsha	Karnataka State Film Award for First Best Film; Karnataka State Film Award for Best Screenplay
1995	Beladingala Baale	Karnataka State Film Award for Third Best Film; Karnataka State Film Award for Best Dialogue; Filmfare Award for Best Director – Kannada
1996	Nammoora Mandara Hoove	
1998	Prema Raga Haadu Gelathi	
1999	Prathyartha	Karnataka State Film Award for Best Screenplay
2000	Sparsha	Filmfare Award for Best Director – Kannada
2002	Parva	
2002	Marma	
2006	Ramya Chaitrakaala	
2007	Kshana Kshana	
2016	...Re	
2019	Udgharsha	
