= List of Kannada films of 2016 =

A list of Kannada language films produced in the Kannada film industry in India in 2016.

== Box office collection ==
The highest-grossing Kannada films released in 2016, by worldwide box office gross revenue, are as follows.

The rank of the films in the following depends on the worldwide gross.

The highest worldwide gross of 2016
Rank	Title	Production company	Worldwide gross	References
1	Kirik Party	Paramvah Studios Pushkar Films	₹50 crore (US$5.2 million)	
2	Doddmane Hudga	Ajay Pictures	₹45 crore (US$4.7 million)	
3	Kotigobba 2	Rockline Entertainments	₹35.4 crore (US$3.7 million)	
4	Santhu Straight Forward	Jayanna Combines Eros International	₹30 crore (US$3.1 million)	
5	Jaggu Dada	R9 Entertainments RH Entertainments	₹20.5 crore (US$2.1 million)	
6	Mungaru Male 2	E. K. Pictures	₹15 crore (US$1.6 million)	
7	U Turn	Pawan Kumar Studios	₹7.5 crore (US$780,000)	

== Film awards events ==
- 63rd National Film Awards
- Karnataka State Film Awards 2015
- 63rd Filmfare Awards South
- 5th South Indian International Movie Awards
- Suvarna Film Awards, by Suvarna channel.
- Udaya Film Awards, by Udaya Channel
- Bengaluru International Film Festival
- Bangalore Times Film Awards

== January–June ==
Opening		Title	Director	Cast	Notes	Ref
J A N	1	Ishtartha	Pran	Vijay Subramanya, Sripriya Bopayya, Sujith, Killer Venkatesh, Ramesh Pandith, Bank Janardhan	Produced by Sri Keerthi Cine Productions	
J A N	1	Kathe Chitrakathe Nirdeshana Puttanna	Srinivas Raju	Komal Kumar, Priyamani, Pooja Gandhi, P. Ravi Shankar, Sadhu Kokila, Doddanna	Remake of Telugu film Geethanjali (2014); Produced by Apple Blossom Creations	
J A N	1	Killing Veerappan	Ram Gopal Varma	Shiva Rajkumar, Parul Yadav, Yagna Shetty, Sanchari Vijay, Sandeep Bharadwaj	Produced by G. R. Pictures and ZED3 Pictures	
J A N	8	Dynamic	Seetharam Bhat	Karthik Samag, Navya Rao, Vijay Jetty, Dushyanth Chakravarthi, Sushma, Alisha, Harish Kalal, Muni Shetty	Produced by Anagha Enterprises	
J A N	8	Maduveya Mamatheya Kareyole	Kaviraj	Suraj Gowda, Amulya, Ananth Nag	Produced by Thoogudeepa Productions	
J A N	15	Last Bus	S. D. Arvind	Avinash Narasimharaju, Meghashree Bhagavatar, Manasa Joshi, Samarth Narasimharaju, Deepak P. I	Produced by Goals and Dreams	
J A N	15	Parapancha	Krish Joshi	Ragini Dwivedi, Diganth, Ananth Nag, Rangayana Raghu, Yogaraj Bhat, Bhavana Rao, Anitha Bhat, K. S. L. Swamy, H. G. Dattatreya, V. Manohar	Produced by Yogaraj Movies	
J A N	15	Tharle Nan Maklu	Rakesh	Yathiraj, Nagashekar, Shubha Poonja	Produced by Sri Ranga Movies	
J A N	15	Thili Neeru	Yogaraj	Yogaraj, Swathi, Lakshmiraj Shetty, Anusha	Produced by R S V Productions	
J A N	22	Mast Mohabbat	Mohan Malagi	Prem Kumar, Poonam Bajwa, Chikkanna, Sadhu Kokila, Naveen Krishna	Produced by Manasa Movies	
J A N	22	Ricky	Rishab Shetty	Rakshit Shetty, Hariprriya, Kishore, Achyuth Kumar	Produced by S V Productions	
J A N	29	Viraat	H. Vasudeva	Darshan, Vidisha Srivastav, Chaithra Chandranath, Isha Chawla, P. Ravi Shankar, Suhasini Maniratnam, Sumalatha, Sadhu Kokila	Produced by Teja Cinemas	
F E B	5	Bhagyaraj	Deepak Madhuvanahalli	Mahesh, Jahnavi Kamath, Sanketh Kashi, Nagendra Shah, Sudhakar, Mimicry Gopi, Roopesh Kumar	Produced by Sami Associates	
F E B	5	Devara Naadalli	B. Suresha	Prakash Raj, Achyuth Kumar, Disha Ramesh, Mandya Ramesh, Manu Hegde, Sihi Kahi Chandru	Produced by Media House Studio	
F E B	5	Gajapade	Seenu	Harsha, Arun, Siddesh, Thanmayi, Navya, Monisha, Victory Vasu, Master Anand	Produced by Kunchi Creations	
F E B	5	Jwalantham	Ambarish B M	Jwala, Deepthi Kapse, Deepa Gowda, Achyuth Kumar, Yashwanth Shetty, Chetan Poojari, Rohan Kidiyoor, Arasu, Pavan	Produced by Divine Movies	
F E B	5	Nanilde Nee Irtheeya	Veeresh Buradi	Sampath, Kalpana	Produced by Shanthadevi Chithralaya	
F E B	5	Priyanka	Dinesh Babu	Priyanka Upendra, Tejas, Prakash Raj, Shivadwaj, Avinash	Produced by Sai Sree Enterprises	
F E B	5	Shivayogi Sri Puttayyajja	Hamsa Vijeth	Vijay Raghavendra, Shruthi, Anu Prabhakar, Abhijeeth, Shashikumar, Shankaralinga Sugnalli, Umesh Navale	Produced by Sri Thulaja Bhavani Combines	
F E B	12	Banavasi	Dheeraj Surya	Lochan Barga, Sanathani, Sanjay Shivan, Ramesh Bhat, Dingri Nagaraj, Siddaraj Kalyankar	Produced by Sri Chandra Choodeshwara Movies	
F E B	12	Preethiyalli Sahaja	Ratnaja	Surya, Aqsa Bhatt, Raghu Mukherjee, Avanthika Mohan, Devaraj, Suhasini Maniratnam, Avinash	Produced by GVK Cinemas	
F E B	12	Shivalinga	P. Vasu	Shiva Rajkumar, Vedhika, Urvashi, Avinash, Vinaya Prasad, Ashok, Pradeep Rawat, Sadhu Kokila	Produced by Suresh Arts	
F E B	19	Actor	Dayal Padmanabhan	Naveen Krishna, Sihi Kahi Geetha	Produced by Chitraloka Movies	
F E B	19	Bhale Jodi	Sadhu Kokila	Sumanth Shailendra, Shanvi Srivastava, Harshika Poonacha, Ravi Shankar, Hariprriya, Sadhu Kokila	Remake of Telugu film Ala Modalaindi (2011); Produced by Sri Shailendra Productions	
F E B	19	Madhura Swapna	Ravirathnam Karamala	Arjun Kapikad, Keerthana Podwal, Mahalakshmi, Avinash, Vinaya Prasad, Ashok, Mukhyamantri Chandru, Ramakrishna	Produced by ONS Creations	
F E B	19	Nan Love Track	Kathir	Rakshith Gowda, Nidhi Kushalappa, Manoj Kumar, Achyuth Kumar, Sudha Belawadi	Produced by JK Enterprises	
F E B	19	Raj Bahaddur	Alwin	Thriller Puneeth, Sri Shruthi, Saikumar, Thriller Manju, Anitha Bhat, Harish Roy	Produced by Megha Star Creations	
F E B	19	U The End A	Nagendra Karanik	Nagendra, Kumuda Gowda, Yashaswini, Ananth Nag, Sadhu Kokila, Rangayana Raghu, Avinash, Raju Thalikote	Produced by Sri Thrayambike Devi Talkies	
F E B	26	400	Prakash Kabettu	Prakash Kabettu, Rashmi, Raghavendra Rai, Jayaprakasha Mavinakuli, Lakshmi Swarajya, Sandeep Kumar	Produced by Opera Dream Movies	
F E B	26	Game	A. M. R. Ramesh	Arjun Sarja, Shaam, Manisha Koirala, Aqsa Bhatt, Seetha	Simultaneously shot in Tamil as Oru Melliya Kodu; Produced by Akshaya Creations	
F E B	26	Krishna-Rukku	Anil Kumar	Ajay Rao, Amulya, Lekha Chandra, Girija Lokesh, Shobhraj	Produced by Vasavi Enterprises	
F E B	26	Mareyalaare	Sharath Kadri	Thandav, Pavithra Belliyappa, Avinash, Mithra, Gunashekar, Malathishree	Produced by Surabhi Talkies Pvt. Ltd.	
F E B	26	Preethi Kithabu	Vittal Bhat	Nihal, Duniya Rashmi, Poorvi Joshi, Sujay, Avinash, Ramesh Bhat	Produced by Rainbow Productions	
F E B	26	Whatsapp Love	Raam	Jeeva, Aishwarya Sindhogi, Mamatha Rahuth, Chikkanna, Srikanth, Thilak, Srinagar Kitty, Shravya	Produced by JPR Groups	
M A R	4	...Re	Sunil Kumar Desai	Ramesh Aravind, Ananth Nag, Harshika Poonacha, Loknath, Sumana, Suman Nagarkar, Ramesh Bhat, Shivaram, Master Hirannaiah, Sharath Lohitashwa	Produced by Sujana Creations	
M A R	4	Chadurida Karmoda	K. N. Krishnamurthy Rao	Gangadhar, Smitha Gowda, Dharani, Chandrahas Suvarna, Sathish Gowda	Produced by Suvarna Sai Productions	
M A R	4	Dandu	Sanjeev Megoti	Neeraj Shyam, Saikumar, Neha Saxena, Disha Poovaiah, Thriller Manju, Thulasi Shivamani, Ramesh Bhat	Produced by Yashaswini Entertainments	
M A R	4	Supari Surya	R Raghuraj	Virat, Madhurima Banerjee, Sadhu Kokila, Sharath Lohitashwa, Ugram Manju, Bhavya	Produced by Chamundi Cinemas	
M A R	4	Tha	Giridhar P	Vinod, Bindu, Krishna, Roja, Deepesh, Bhanu Prasad, Ammu Prasad, Naveen, Rajesh	Produced by Gagan Geeth Arts	
M A R	4	Tyson	K Ramnarayan	Vinod Prabhakar, Gayathri Iyer, Srinivasa Murthy, Vinaya Prasad, Chikkanna, Suman, Ravi Kale, Thriller Manju	Produced by Druvin Productions	
M A R	10	Bullet Rani	Sajid Qureshi	Nisha Kothari, Ashish Vidyarthi, Avinash, Ravi Kale, Amith, Shafi	Produced by Focus On Pictures	
M A R	11	Aham	Jayagaja Venkatesh	Naveen Krishna, Bhoomika, Archana, Jai Devaraj, Ramesh Bhat, Bhavya	Produced by Jaidevaraj Films	
M A R	11	CBI Sathya	Y. Krishnam Raju	Thriller Manju, Abhijith, Archana, Gayathri, Tara, Doddanna, M. S. Umesh	Produced by Raviprasad Movie Makers	
M A R	11	Chiravada Nenapu	Vincent Bernard	Gurunandan, Sharanya, Snehith Gowda, Thaniya, Ramakrishna, Jai Jagadish	Produced by Mayathere Combines	
M A R	11	Kiragoorina Gayyaligalu	D. Sumana Kittur	Shwetha Srivatsav, Yogesh, Ajay Rao, Kishore, Sukrutha Wagle, Sonu Gowda, Karunya Ram, Achyuth Kumar, Sharath Lohitashwa, Sundar, S. Narayan, Girija Lokesh, Lakshmi Chandrashekar, Ravishankar Gowda	Produced by Megha Movies	
M A R	11	Simpallag Innondh Love Story	Suni	Praveen Tej, Meghana Gaonkar, Master Hemanth	Produced by Ashu Bedra Venture	
M A R	11	Sri Sathyanarayana	Harish Raj	Harish Raj, Ramya Barna, Cudavalli Chandrashekar, Jai Jagadish, Ramakrishna, Radha Ramchandra	Produced by Harish Raj Productions	
M A R	18	Bheeshma	Raviraj	Kishore, Hardika Shetty, Nakul, Shobhraj, G Ramachandran, Bullet Prakash	Produced by G R Gold Films	
M A R	18	Mahaveera Machideva	Nandi Kameshwara Reddy	Saikumar, Charulatha, B. C. Patil, M. S. Umesh, Vijayakashi, Ramesh Bhat, Suchithra	Produced by Sri Anjaneya Creations	
M A R	18	Ranatantra	Aadiram	Vijay Raghavendra, Hariprriya, Sathyajith, Bhajarangi Madhu, Vishal Hegde, Aishwarya Sindhogi	Produced by R Manoj Kumar Yadav Productions	
M A R	25	Byadagi Mirchi	B. S. Sanjay	Vishnuvardhana, Manisha Choudhary, Madhuchanda, Madhusudan, Alisha, Victory Vasu	Produced by Sneha Entertainers	
M A R	25	Cinema My Darling	Gaurish Akki	Vihan Gowda, Sanjjana, Manojava Galagali, Shashi Deshpande, Sanchari Vijay	Produced by Gaurish Akki Cinemas	
M A R	25	Jessie	Pawan Wadeyar	Dhananjay, Parul Yadav, Raghu Mukherjee, Sumalatha, Avinash, Ramakrishna	Produced by R S Productions	
M A R	25	Kala Bhairava	Shiva Prabhu	Yogesh, Akhila Kishore, Sharath Lohitashwa, Rangayana Raghu, Mesthri Balu, Suchendra Prasad	Produced by Super Good Combines	
M A R	25	Matthe Shhh	Wesley Brown	Vijay Chendoor, Shruthi Heera, Sushma, Ashok Kashyap, Ram, Shamitha Shah	Produced by S R Talkies	
M A R	25	Nithya Jothe Sathya	Srinag	Manish Babu, Thejaswini, Devaraj, Kempegowda, Kuri Ranga, Mithra, Vishwa, Dinesh	Produced by Bhagyalakshmi Creations	
A P R	1	Half Mentlu	Lakshmi Dinesh	Sandeep, Sonu Gowda, Mico Nagaraj, Lakshmidevamma, Tabla Nani, Achyuth Kumar	Produced by Sairam Cine Talkies	
A P R	1	Kollegala	Venkatesh Deekshith	Venkatesh Deekshith, Deepa Gowda, Kiran Gowda, Dharma Thej, Suchendra Prasad, Karthik, Avani, Srinivas	Produced by A Frame to Frame Movies	
A P R	1	Koudi	Ravindranath Sirivara	B. Jayashree, Manasa Joshi, Madhu, Sumathi Patil, Sridhar Kaveri, Chethan Kumar, Anupama, Venkataraju, Dwarakish Reddy	Produced by Kannada Circle	
A P R	1	Sri Chakram	Govinde Gowda	Arav Surya, Teena Ponnappa, Sneha, Shobhraj, Jai Jagadish, Bank Janardhan	Produced by SLN Productions	
A P R	8	Jai Maruthi 800	A. Harsha	Sharan, Shruti Hariharan, Shubha Poonja, Sadhu Kokila, Arun Sagar	Produced by Jayanna Combines	
A P R	8	Siganduru Chowdeshwari Mahime	Shashikumar	Sudharani, Harish Raj, Shubha Poonja, Shankar Bhat, Sanjana Naidu	Produced by Sri Chowdeshwari Devi Productions	
A P R	14	Ramabai	M. Ranganath	Yagna Shetty, Dr. Sidram Karnik	Produced by Sri Parameshwari Arts	
A P R	15	Raja Nanna Raja (Re-release)	A. V. Seshagiri Rao	Rajkumar, Aarathi, K. S. Ashwath, Cudavalli Chandrashekar, Thoogudeepa Srinivas	Re-release of the 1976 film Produced by Madhu Art Films	
A P R	15	Red	Rajesh Murthy	Raj Aryan, Kamini, Rahul Somanna, M J Pruthvi, Panchami	Produced by Rajesh Murthy Productions	
A P R	15	The Great Story of Sodabuddi	Jyothirao Mohith	Uthpal Gowda, Anusha Ranganath, Kushee Ravi, Rangayana Raghu, Achyuth Kumar, Master Hemanth	Produced by UG Perfect Pictures	
A P R	22	Apsare	Sarathi	Mamatha Rahuth, Kalla Police Rajendra, Ashok Kheny, Yash Kanodia, Nagendra Urs, Sanjeev, Prasad	Produced by Sarathi's Cinema	
A P R	22	Babruvahana (Re-release)	Hunsur Krishnamurthy	Rajkumar, B. Sarojadevi, Kanchana, Jayamala, Vajramuni, Ramakrishna, Thoogudeepa Srinivas	Re-release of the 1977 film Produced by Rajkamal Arts	
A P R	22	Bilindar	Ravi Basrur	Ravi Basrur, Sheeja Shetty	Produced by Inkfinite Pictures "Chilri Shoki" – sung by Puneeth Rajkumar	
A P R	22	Yashogathe	Vinod J. Raj	Manasa Joshi, Pavithra Belliyappa, Lohith Surya, Tvisha Adappa Tandur	Produced by Moksh Films & Eidikos Productions	
A P R	29	Chakravyuha	M. Saravanan	Puneeth Rajkumar, Rachita Ram, Arun Vijay, Abhimanyu Singh, Bhavya, Rangayana Raghu, Sadhu Kokila	Produced by Sunshine Productions	
A P R	29	Ooty	Mahesh Kumar	Avinash Narasimharaju, Naina Sarwar, Guruprasad, Nikhil, Giriraj	Produced by Parivarthana Productions	
M A Y	6	Akira	G. Naveen Reddy	Aniissh Tejeshwar, Aditi Rao, Krishi Thapanda, Rangayana Raghu, Avinash	Produced by S2 Entertainment	
M A Y	6	Mangaata	M. Lohithraj	Roopesh, Mamatha Rahuth, Pooja, R. N. Sudarshan, Achyuth Kumar, Narayana Swamy	Produced by 3A Cine Productions	
M A Y	6	Thale Bachkolli Powder Hakkolli	A. Venugopal	Vikram Arya, Chikkanna, Nikita Thukral, Aman Grewal, Bullet Prakash, M. S. Umesh	Produced by Dyamamma Devi Creations	
M A Y	6	Thithi	Raam Reddy	Thammegowda, Channegowda, Abhishek H.N., Singri Gowda	Winner of National Film Award for Best Feature Film in Kannada; Produced by Prspctvs Productions	
M A Y	13	Ishtakamya	Nagathihalli Chandrashekar	Vijay Suriya, Kavya Shetty, Mayuri Kyatari, Rangayana Raghu, Chikkanna, B. Jayashree, Suman Nagarkar	Based on Dodderi Venkatagiri Rao's novel Ishtakamya; Produced by Nagathihalli Cine Creations	
M A Y	13	Sakkath Risk	M. G. Raj	Harish, Raju, Shivu, Nagarjun, Susaikumar, Ria Devadiga, Kavya, Anu, Ravikrishna, Jaisurya, Shivu, Rohith, Nataraj, Aruna, Ugram Ravi	Produced by Sai Leela Media Dreams & Sri Durga Huliyuramma Enterprises	
M A Y	13	Style King	PC Shekhar	Ganesh, Remya Nambeesan, Rajendran, Rangayana Raghu, Sadhu Kokila	Produced by Maruthi Enterprises	
M A Y	20	Daksha Yagna	Siddegowda GBS	Somu, Niharika, Priyanka, Shwetha, Shiva, Niranjan, Sachin, Sathish Ponnayya, Nagendra Prasad	Produced by Jeevitha Creations	
M A Y	20	Thandava	Gopal	Vasanth, Chandini, Dharma, Mico Nagaraj, Srinivasa Prabhu, Swathi Ambarish, Ashwin	Produced by Kakarappa Gowda Films	
M A Y	20	U Turn	Pawan Kumar	Shraddha Srinath, Roger Narayan, Radhika Chetan, Dileep Raj, Skanda Ashok, Krishna Hebbale, Sudha Belawadi, Aarna Kulkarni	Produced by Pawan Kumar Studios	
M A Y	27	Apoorva	V. Ravichandran	V. Ravichandran, Apoorva, Vijay Raghavendra, Sudeep, P. Ravi Shankar, Suchendra Prasad	Produced by Sri Eshwari Productions	
M A Y	27	Coma	Ravi, Chethan	Karthik Kumar, Shruthi Nandish, Guruprasad, S. K. Bhagavan, Ranjan Mishra, Suchendra Prasad, Shille Manju, Ajith	Produced by Soundarya Creations	
M A Y	27	Karvva	Navaneeth	Thilak, Devaraj, Anisha Ambrose, RJ Rohith, Anu Poovamma, Poonam Singar, Vijay Chendoor, Srinivas Prabhu	Produced by Sri Swarnalatha Productions	
M A Y	27	Lehya Ajji Lehya	Devaraj	Lakshmiraj Shetty, Nayana Krishna, Smruthi Gowda Sowbhagya, Anitha	Produced by Darshan Gowda Productions	
M A Y	27	Mr. Mommaga	N. Raghavan	S S Ravi, Oviya, Rangayana Raghu, Avinash, Kuri Prathap, Bullet Prakash, Girish, M. N. Lakshmi Devi	Remake of Tamil film Manjapai (2014); Produced by Sumukha Entertainers	
M A Y	27	Shalini	C. Mallikarjun	Santhosh, Prema Kanchan, Puneeth, Aravind, Anvitha, Kavya Gowda, Shobhraj	Produced by SLV Cinemas	
M A Y	27	Suli	P. H. Vishwanath	Srinath, Pragathi A S, Jayaram Ninasam, Susheelamma, Advithi, Ashwithi, Chennakeshava, Lingaraju	Produced by Diya Communications Pvt Ltd	
J U N	3	Birth	Shivu Holalu	Srikanth, Duniya Rashmi, Disha Poovaiah, Madhusudan, Chandrashekar, Dhanush, Thejas	Produced by Dhanush & Thejas Creations	
J U N	3	Godhi Banna Sadharana Mykattu	Hemanth M. Rao	Ananth Nag, Rakshit Shetty, Shruthi Hariharan, Achyuth Kumar, Vasishta N. Simha, Ravikiran	Produced by Pushkar Films, Lost & Found Films	
J U N	10	Brahma Vishnu Maheshwara	Swaroop Swara	Santhosh MH, Anjan Dev, Sunil, Preetham Puneeth, Keerthi Lakshmi, Aishwarya, Jeevitha, Chikkanna, Rangayana Raghu, Bullet Prakash, Sadhu Kokila	Produced by HRP Cine Max	
J U N	10	Dress Code	Shivu Kumar	Pruthvi, Hema, Divya, Kanchana, Shivu Balaji, Harish	Produced by Golden Eye Movie	
J U N	10	Jaggu Dada	Raghavendra Hegde	Darshan, Deeksha Seth, Ananth Nag, P. Ravi Shankar, Urvashi, Srujan Lokesh, Sharath Lohitashwa, Vishal Hegde, Rajat Bedi, Achyuth Kumar, Sadhu Kokila, Bullet Prakash, Rachita Ram, Deepika Kamaiah, Pranitha Subhash	Produced by R9 Entertainment & RH Entertainment	
J U N	17	Beat	Ghanashyam	Patre Ajith, Harshika Poonacha, Shilpa, Shankar Ashwath, Joe Simon, Amith	Produced by Yashas Films	
J U N	17	Jothegathi	K. Shashidhar	Lakshmi Hegde, Manjunath Hegde, Prashanth Malur, Thanuja Mohan	Produced by Sapthagiri Movie Makers	
J U N	17	Mandya Star	Parva MRK	Lokesh, Archana, Ranjitha, Puttainiah, Jai Jagadish, Om Prakash Rao, Padmaja Rao	Produced by Hidden Frames	
J U N	24	Home Stay	Santhosh Kodenkeri	Ashok Balakrishnan, Sayali Bhagat, Shruti, Ravi Kale, Rishab Shetty, H. G. Dattatreya	Also released in Tamil and Hindi; Produced by Miracle Movie Makers & Sahana Pictures	
J U N	24	Jigarthanda	Shiva Ganesh	Raahul, P. Ravi Shankar, Samyukta Hornad, Chikkanna, Sadhu Kokila, H. G. Dattatreya	Remake of Tamil film Jigarthanda (2014); Produced by SRV Productions	
J U N	24	Lakshmana	R. Chandru	Anup Revanna, Meghana Raj, V. Ravichandran, Baahubali Prabhakar, Chikkanna, Pradeep Rawat, Sadhu Kokila, Sridevi Vijayakumar	Remake of Telugu film Athanokkade (2005); Produced by Sairanga Cinemas Pvt Ltd	
J U N	24	Raktha Shasana	V. Manju	Shivu, Rashmitha, Shobhraj	Produced by NGB Enterprises	
J U N	24	Sahasa Simha (Re-release)	Joe Simon	Vishnuvardhan, Kajal Kiran, Rajyalakshmi, Vajramuni, Dheerendra Gopal, Thoogudeepa Srinivas	Re-release of the 1982 film Produced by Sri Lakshmi Cine Productions	

== July–December ==
Opening		Title	Director	Cast	Notes	Ref
J U L	1	Naani	Sumanth	Manish Arya, Priyanka Rao, Baby Suhasini, Suhasini Maniratnam, Jai Jagadish, Kishori Ballal, Ramesh Pandith, Ramesh Bhat	Produced by Tulsi Films	
J U L	1	Zoom	Prashant Raj	Ganesh, Radhika Pandit, Kashinath, Dev Gill, Sadhu Kokila, Nurse Jayalakshmi	Adapted from Hollywood film Lover Come Back (1961); Produced by Nimma Cinema & Pride Films	
J U L	8	Mathu Kathe	Lucky	Krishna Kumar, Gouthami Gowda, Harsha, Rachana	Produced by Lucky Movies	
J U L	8	Run Antony	V. Raghu Shastry	Vinay Rajkumar, Rukshar Mir, Sushmitha Joshi, Devaraj, Saikumar, Bullet Prakash, K. S. Sridhar, Shivajirao Jadhav, H. G. Dattatreya	Produced by Sri Vajreshwari Hospitalitis	
J U L	15	Bhujanga	Jeeva	Prajwal Devaraj, Meghana Raj, Sadhu Kokila, Jai Jagadish, Bullet Prakash	Produced by Nagamale Movies	
J U L	15	Kalpana 2	R. Anantha Raju	Upendra, Priyamani, Avantika Shetty, Vinaya Prasad, Ramesh Bhat, Prakash Heggodu, Thulasi Shivamani	Remake of Tamil film Kanchana 2 Produced by Rajendra Movies	
J U L	15	Nanna Ninna Prema Kathe	Shivu Jamakhandi	Vijay Raghavendra, Nidhi Subbaiah, Thilak Shekar, Chikkanna, Sudha Belawadi, Sangeetha	Produced by AB Cinema Creations	
J U L	22	Akshathe	Raju Devasandra	Kartik Shetty, Mythreya Gowda, Raaj Surya, Vinaya Prasad, Avinash, Chithra Shenoy, Nurse Jayalakshmi, Raju Thalikote	Produced by Sri Gurumanthralaya Productions	
J U L	22	Haaro Hakki	Nagaraj Arehole	Master Shruthidhar, Baby Shreya, Ashok B. A., Prabhakar, Kuladeep, Ramesh Babu	Produced by Sri Nimishamba Communications & Brain Centre	
J U L	29	Deal Raja	Raj Gopisurya	Komal, Bhanu Sri Mehra, Ithi Acharya, Suman Ranganathan, Bullet Prakash, Jai Jagadish, Sadhu Kokila, Tabla Nani	Produced by Meghadooth Movies	
J U L	29	Puta Thirugisi Nodi	Suneel Raghavendra	Kailash TV, Adithi Kalkunte, Sudha Belawadi, Sharath Bhagavan, Anirudh Acharya	Produced by Talents Day Films	
J U L	29	Santheyalli Nintha Kabira	Indra Babu	Shiva Rajkumar, Sanusha, R. Sarath Kumar, Ananth Nag, H. G. Dattatreya, Avinash, Sharath Lohitashwa, Sanjjana	Adapted from Bhisham Sahni's Hindi play "Kabira Khada Bazaar Mein"; Produced by Subrahmanya Productions	
A U G	5	1944	S. Badarinath	Naveen Krishna, Shivani, Shruti, Bhavya, Suchendra Prasad, Bank Janardhan	Adapted from N. S. Rao's drama "Rotti Runa"; Produced by Jai Bharathambhe Movie Makers	
A U G	12	22 July 1947	Vishal Raj	Suchendra Prasad, Sudharani, Achyuth Kumar, Shobhraj	Adapted from Saraju Katkar's novel Produced by Sri Muneshwara Movie Makers	
A U G	12	Kotigobba 2	K. S. Ravikumar	Sudeep, Nithya Menen, Prakash Raj, Devaraj, P. Ravi Shankar, Sadhu Kokila, Nassar, Chikkanna	Produced by Rambabu Productions; Releasing simultaneously in Tamil Mudinja Ivana Pudi	
A U G	19	Asthitva	Nuthan Umesh	Yuvaraj, Prajwal Poovayya, Madhusudhan, Duniya Rashmi, Sonu Gowda, Shine Shetty	Remake of Tamil film Naan (2012); Produced by Vsan Infrastructure Pvt Ltd	
A U G	19	Crazy Boy	Mahesh Babu	Dilip Prakash, Ashika Ranganath, P. Ravi Shankar, Rangayana Raghu, Sadhu Kokila, Ananth Nag	Produced by Durga Parameshwari Amma Films	
A U G	19	Madamakki	Vinay Preetham	Thanush, Nikitha Narayan, Saikumar, Tara, Rajendra Karanth	Produced by Sri Rama Talkies	
A U G	26	Chadurida Karmoda	K. N. Krishnamurthy Rao	Gangadhar, Smitha Gowda, Dharani, Chandrahas Suvarna, Sathish Gowda, Rathnamala	Produced by Suvarna Sai Productions	
A U G	26	Happy Birthday	K. Mahesh Sukhadhare	Sachin, Samskruthy Shenoy, Achyuth Kumar, Ravi Kale, Ninasam Ashwath, Prashanth Siddi, Rajesh Nataranga, Sadhu Kokila, Chikkanna, Bullet Prakash, H. G. Dattatreya, Ambareesh, Srinagar Kitty	Produced by Swarnambika Pictures	
A U G	26	Lifeu Super	Vinod Kumar. R	Likhith Surya, Meghana Appayya, Niranth, Anu Chinnappa, Rangayana Raghu, Achyuth Kumar, Rockline Sudhakar	Produced by Sri Guru Creations	
A U G	26	Naada Rakshaka	Aman Kannadiga	Aman Kannadiga, Mythriya Gowda, T. A. Narayana Gowda, Sameer Kannadiga, Bullet Prakash, Ramesh Bhat, Mohan Juneja, Bhavya	Produced by AA** Productions	
A U G	26	Sa	Hemanth Hegde	Jayram Karthik (JK), Vijay Suriya, Samyukta Hornad, Hemanth Hegde, Anuradha Mukherjee, Doddanna, Ramesh Bhat	Produced by Srihari Enterprises	
A U G	27	Hey Sarasu	B. Ramamurthy	Ramesh Aravind, Saritha Jain, Ashwini	Produced by Om Sri Chamundeshwari Films	
S E P	2	Avadhi	Saikiran Mukkamala	Ranjith, Archana, Ramesh Bhat, Manjunath Gowda, Jai Jagadish, Srinivasa Prabhu, Suchithra	Produced by Maantrix Media Works	
S E P	2	Bablusha	Venkat Bharadwaj	Harsh Arjun, Mrudhula Bhaskar, Mani Shetty, Baby Shama, Paramesh, Avinash, Shobhraj	Produced by Amrutha Film Center	
S E P	2	Jil Jil	A. Madhu	Dhananjay, Puvisha Manoharan, Sumathi Patil, Ravikumar Dasarahalli	Produced by Sri Belaguli Honnammadevi Productions	
S E P	2	Kempammana Court Case	Cudavalli Chandrashekar	Ninasam Siddarth, Vishveshwar, Thaniya Chandrashekar, Hitha Chandrashekar, Jai Jagadish, Srinath, Radha Ramachandra, Asha Jois	Produced by Masuvi Productions	
S E P	2	Neer Dose	Vijaya Prasad	Jaggesh, Hariprriya, Suman Ranganathan, H. G. Dattatreya	Produced by Skkandda Entertainment	
S E P	2	Prema Geema Jaane Do	Kenja Chethan Kumar	Gowtham Ghatke, Pallavi Gowda, Shruthi Thimmaiah, Pallavi Gowda, Sheethal Shetty, Ramesh Bhat	Produced by Horizon Movies	
S E P	2	Selfie	Phani Kotaprolu	Thrilok Shroff, Deepa Gowda, Pooja Kamath, Namratha Gaurakar, Rajendra Raj, Navin Kaipu, Narmada Guddu, Kiran Kumar	Produced by Weekend Movie Makers	
S E P	2	Sikkapatte Ishtapatte	P. Harirajan	Namitha, Shravanth, Kiran Rathod, Ravindranath, Meghana Naidu, Aneesh, Maneesh, Keerthi Chawla	Produced by Sri Preyam Creations	
S E P	10	Golisoda	Raghujaya	Vikram, Priyanka Jain, Divya Rangayana, Hemanth, Chandan, Manju, Raghu, Tara, Shobhraj, Ragini Dwivedi	Remake of Tamil film Goli Soda (2014); Produced by Kolla Entertainments	
S E P	10	Mungaru Male 2	Shashank	Ganesh, V. Ravichandran, Neha Shetty, Aindrita Ray, P. Ravi Shankar, Sadhu Kokila, Tabla Nani	Produced by E K Pictures	
S E P	16	Ananthana Chellata	S. Chandru	Sushil Mokashi, Mamatha Rahuth, Bullet Prakash, Shankar Bhat, Ganesh Rao, Suresh Hegde, Rathnamala	Produced by Sri Lakshmi Vasudevaya Enterprises	
S E P	16	Just Aakasmika	Himayath Khan	Vinod Patil, Sanjjana, Thilak Shekar, Sachin Suvarna, Ramesh Bhat, Mukhyamantri Chandru	Produced by Eye Spice Productions Pvt Ltd	
S E P	23	Adbhutha	K. Anbu Urs	Ravindra, Deepa Gowda, Anjali, Srinivas, Ramesh Bhat	Produced by Chandragiri Creations	
S E P	23	Danger Zone	Devraj Kumar	Roop Shetty, Ramya, Raghav Uday, Rithesh, Abishek, Abhay, Nanditha, Kavya	Produced by Kambadri Enterprises	
S E P	23	Possible	Raaj	Surya, Shravya, Shobhraj, Mohan Juneja, Ramakrishna, Padma Vasanthi	Produced by Aakara Creations	
S E P	23	Sipaayi	Rajath Mayee	Siddharth Mahesh, Sruthi Hariharan, Achyuth Kumar, Sanchari Vijay, Gaurish Akki	Produced by Orange Pixels	
S E P	30	Doddmane Hudga	Duniya Soori	Puneeth Rajkumar, Ambareesh, Radhika Pandit, Sumalatha, Bharathi Vishnuvardhan, 'Madarangi' Krishna, P. Ravi Shankar, Rangayana Raghu, Chikkanna	Produced by Ajay Pictures	
S E P	30	Yuva Samrat	Yashwanth Kumar	Kiran Kumar, Snizhana, Srinivasa Murthy, M. S. Umesh, Bharathi Vishnuvardhan	Produced by Sri Varalakshmi Films	
O C T	6	Jaguar	Mahadev	Nikhil Gowda, Deepti Sati, Ramya Krishnan, Jagapati Babu, Sadhu Kokila	Produced by Chennambika Films; Simultaneously released in Telugu	
O C T	7	Dana Kayonu	Yogaraj Bhat	Duniya Vijay, Priyamani, Rangayana Raghu, Suchendra Prasad, Veena Sundar	Produced by R. S. Productions	
O C T	7	Idolle Ramayana	Prakash Rai	Prakash Rai, Priyamani, Achyuth Kumar, Rangayana Raghu, Sanchari Vijay, Aravind Kuplikar	Remake of Malayalam film Shutter (2012); Simultaneously released in Telugu (Mana Oori Ramayanam); Produced by Prakash Raj Production & First Copy Pictures	
O C T	14	Nagarahavu	Kodi Ramakrishna	Vishnuvardhan (VFX Creation), Ramya, Diganth, Saikumar, Rangayana Raghu, Mukul Dev, Darshan	Simultaneously released in Tamil (Sivanaagam) and Telugu (Nagabharanam); Produced by Pen Movies, Inbox Pictures & Blockbuster Studio	
O C T	21	Rama Rama Re	D. Satya Prakash	K. Jayaram, Nataraj S. Bhat, Dharmanna Kaduru, Sridhar, Bimbashree Ninasam	Produced by Kannada Kolor Cinemas	
O C T	21	Seetha Nadhi	K. Sharath	Shreya, Vishnu Vallabha, Honnavalli Krishna, Thanuja, Kuldeep	Produced by Rathi Cine Creations	
O C T	28	Mukunda Murari	Nanda Kishore	Upendra, Sudeep, Nikita Thukral, P. Ravi Shankar, Ishita Vyas, Devaraj, Avinash, Malavika Avinash, Bhavana (Malayalam actress), Rachita Ram	Remake of Hindi film OMG: Oh My God! (2012); Produced by MNK Movies	
O C T	28	Santhu Straight Forward	Mahesh Rao	Yash, Radhika Pandit, Shaam, Devaraj, Ananth Nag, Saikumar	Produced by K Manju Cinemas	
N O V	6	Kahi	Arvind Sastry	Harisharva, Krishi Thapanda, Mathangi Prasan, Suraj Gowda, Ramesh Bhat	Produced by Boiled Beans Picture	
N O V	11	Leela	L M Gowda	Rohith, Almas, Aashik, Adi Lokesh, Shobhraj, Santhosh, Shafi	Produced by Bhavyashree Films	
N O V	17	Nataraja Service	Pawan Wadeyar	Sharan, Mayuri Kyatari, Rockline Venkatesh, P. Ravi Shankar	Produced by Omkar Movies	
N O V	18	Badmaash	Akash Srivatsa	Dhananjay, Sanchita Shetty, Achyuth Kumar, Suchendra Prasad, Ramesh Bhat, Prakash Belawadi, Ithi Acharya	Produced by Vibha Kashyap Productions	
N O V	18	Mareyadiru Endendu	Mahesh Thejas	Adithya Raj, Gamya, Shashikumar, Bhavya, Srinivas Bali, NGF Ramamurthy, Mohan Juneja	Produced by Sadguru Sri Sridharananda Creations	
N O V	25	Madha Mathu Manasi	Satish Pradhan	Prajwal Devaraj, Shruti Hariharan, Rangayana Raghu, Bullet Prakash, Anushree	Produced by Rajesh & Devi Films	
N O V	25	Mandyada Hudugaru	J J Srinivas	J J Srinivas, Rekhashree, Ram Sagar, Ashika Gowda, Venkatesh, Krishnaveni, Basavaraj	Produced by Harshitha Chithralaya	
D E C	2	Mummy	Lohith H	Priyanka Upendra, Yuvina Parthavi, Aishwarya Sindhogi, Vathsala Mohan, K S Sridhar, Madhusudan, Sandeep	Produced by KRK Productions	
D E C	2	No Entry	Yashas A	Ajay Ninasam, Anika Theja, M. S. Umesh, Aravind Rao, Sunil, Vidvan, Pradhumna	Produced by Saurabha Creations	
D E C	9	Dieyana House	Bharath Nanda	Raghav Nag, Thejaswini, Sardar Sathya, Vardhan Thirthahalli	Produced by Mahakaya Team Works	
D E C	9	Jagruthi	Anantha Rayappa	Mandya Jayaram, Stamp Venkatesh, Anantha Rayappa, Ramarao, Hanumantharaju, Raghavendra, Ashwin Kumar, Jayashree N Srinivas, Motamma	Based on the stage play ‘Jagruthi’ Produced by Modern Films	
D E C	9	John Jani Janardhan	Guru Deshpande	Ajay Rao, Yogesh, Madarangi Krishna, Malashri, Kamna Ranauth, M. S. Umesh, Girija Lokesh	Remake of Malayalam film Amar Akbar Anthony (2015); Produced by M R Pictures	
D E C	9	Sojiga	Dinesh Kampli	Vikranth Hegde, Akhila Prakash, Prashanth Siddi, Harini, Yash Shetty, Vishal	Produced by Shravana Enterprises	
D E C	16	One Time	Raaj	Thejas, Neha Saxena, K. S. L. Swamy, T. S. Nagabharana, S. K. Bhagavan, Om Sai Prakash, P. N. Sathya, Vijayalakshmi Singh, Gadda Viji, Malavalli Saikrishna	Produced by Dioxe Entertainment	
D E C	16	Tharle Village	K. M. Raghu	Channegowda, Singri Gowda, Thammegowda S, Abhishek H. N., Harshitha, Bhagyashree, Somu, Real Kencha	Produced by Jeevitha Creations & Audio-Video Research Centre	
D E C	23	Avalucky	Ashok Nittur	Ashok Nittur, Narayana Swamy, Suman Nazre, Divyashree, Master Srikrishna, V B Srisathya, Manjunath Bhat, Suresh	Produced by Sankula Creative Arts	
D E C	23	Naanu Mattu Varalakshmi	Preetham Gubbi	Pruthvi, Malavika Mohanan, Prakash Rai, Madhoo, Rangayana Raghu, Sadhu Kokila, Achyuth Kumar	Produced by Kollur Mookambika Creations	
D E C	23	NH7	T. Yugandhar	Praveen Tej, Chaithra, Kiran, Honnavalli Krishna, Vijanath Biradar	Produced by Prakul Productions	
D E C	23	Niruttara	Apoorva Kasaravalli	Rahul Bose, Kiran Srinivas, Bhavana, Aindrita Ray	Produced by Hometown Productions & Lexicon Motion Pictures Pvt Ltd	
D E C	23	Sundaranga Jaana	Ramesh Aravind	Ganesh, Shanvi Srivastav, Devaraj, Rangayana Raghu, Ravishankar Gowda, Vasishta N. Simha	Remake of Telugu film Bhale Bhale Magadivoy (2015); Produced by Rockline Entertainments Pvt Ltd & GA2 Pictures	
D E C	30	A Happy Married Life	Anand Vatar	Vardhan, Thejaswini, Sumana	Produced by RK Cine Combines	
D E C	30	Ballari Darbar	Smile Seenu	Pola Srinivas Babu, Sampath Kumar, Haji Baba Khan, Arun Kumar, Mamatha Rahuth, Shubharaksha	Produced by Smile Johar Talkies	
D E C	30	Kirik Party	Rishab Shetty	Rakshit Shetty, Rashmika Mandanna, Samyuktha Hegde, Aravinnd Iyer, Dhananjay Ranjan, Chandan Achar	Produced by Paramvah Studios	
D E C	30	Mandya to Mumbai	Rajashekar; Vardhik Joseph	Rakesh Adiga, Amrutha Rao, Sanjjana, Madhuri, Naveen Krishna, Thilak Shekar, Thippatti Ganesh, Chandan	Remake of Tamil film Renigunta (2009); Produced by Sri Neeladurga Parameshwari Combines	
D E C	30	NH 37	Harshavardhan	Padmaja Rao, Chethan Raj, Vikram, Rathan, Pradeep, Devaraj	Produced by Sahana Creations	
D E C	30	Sri Omkara Ayyappane	Om Sai Prakash	Disha Poovaiah, Roja, Ravi Chethan, Naveen Krishna, Ramesh Bhat, Shivaram, Srinivasa Murthy, M. S. Umesh	Produced by Sri Sadguru Sai Creations	
D E C	30	Zero	Giridev Hassan	Nataraj, Master Madhusudan, Kamal Kumar, Aadya, Suchithra, Laya Kokila	Produced by DCL Productions	
