= Yogaraj But =

Indian Kannada-language film

- Promotional poster
- Directed by: Dayal Padmanabhan
- Screenplay by: Dayal Padmanabhan; Naveen Krishna; Vinod Panna
- Story by: Dayal Padmanabhan
- Produced by: Dayal Padmanabhan
- Starring: Naveen Krishna; Neethu
- Cinematography: B Rakesh
- Edited by: Sri (Crazy Mindz)
- Music by: Milind Dharmasena
- Production company: D Pictures
- Release date: 22 July 2011
- Running time: 115 minutes
- Country: India
- Language: Kannada

Yogaraj But (Note: The name is a play on words of Yogaraj Bhat.) is a 2011 Indian Kannada-language film written, directed and produced by Dayal Padmanabhan, starring Naveen Krishna and Neethu. Suchendra Prasad and Tharun Sudhir appear in supporting roles. It follows Yogaraj (Krishna), a cheerful young man whose growing bond with an orphaned Sihi (Neethu) preparing to leave for London changes his outlook on life, love and destiny. The film explores themes of fate, sacrifice, human relationships, all while discovering the deeper meaning of existence.

While Krishna also wrote dialogue for the film, Milind Dharmasena scored its music. Upon theatrical release on 22 July 2011, the film received mixed reviews from critics. They noted that Krishna and Neethu's performance deserved praise, while adding that the philosophy and the humour in the film was not convincing.

== Plot ==
Sihi, an orphan working as an office administrator at the Siddaganga Matha in Tumkur, travels to Bangalore to complete passport, visa and ticket formalities before leaving for London to pursue a course sponsored by the matha. During her stay, she meets Yogaraj, a cheerful psychology graduate and aspiring astrologer who lives with his mother Sumitra and younger sister Yogitha. The two soon become friends, and Yogaraj helps Sihi with her work around the city. Sihi's warm nature also impresses his family after he introduces her to them.

As their friendship deepens, Yogaraj begins to develop feelings for Sihi. However, before he is able to confess them, he meets with a fatal accident. At the mortuary, Yogaraj's soul questions God about the sudden end to his life, expressing regret that he could not fulfil his responsibilities toward his family or discover whether Sihi reciprocated his feelings. Moved by his sincerity, God decides to grant him another chance at life despite Yamadharma's objections, and diverts the accident that caused his death.

After returning to life, Yogaraj confesses his love to Sihi, but she initially rejects him, revealing that a man named Chandru has already proposed to her and that she intends to meet him before leaving for London. When Sihi informs Chandru that she is unwilling to marry him, Yogaraj becomes hopeful once again. Sihi eventually promises Yogaraj that she would marry him after returning from London in six months. Overjoyed, Yogaraj drops her off at the airport, but suffers another fatal accident on his way back.

Yogaraj's soul once again questions God over his life being taken away a second time. God explains that Yogaraj was destined to have a short lifespan. Still unwilling to give up, Yogaraj pleads for another chance, saying he wished to experience life with Sihi now that she had accepted his love. God then tells him that Sihi too is destined to die within a few months. Heartbroken, Yogaraj selflessly requests that her life be extended instead of his own. God agrees to the request, and later reveals to Yamadharma that Sihi was never actually destined to die, but that the test was meant to determine Yogaraj's selflessness and purity of heart. Impressed by his sacrifice, God grants Yogaraj moksha. Meanwhile, Sihi, unaware of Yogaraj's death, calls him before boarding her flight to London, but receives no response. As she leaves, she fondly reminisces about the moments they shared and dreams about their future together after her return. The film concludes with a reflective narration about the meaning of life, the people one encounters, the memories created and the dreams that give purpose to human existence.

== Cast ==
- Naveen Krishna as Yogaraj
- Neethu as Sihi
- Suchendra Prasad as Paramatma
- Patre Ajith as Chandru
- Srinivasa Murthy as a wandering swami
- Tharun Sudhir as Yamadharma
- Sihi Kahi Chandru as "Kahi" Chandru
- Shivakumar as Shivaram
- Amith
- A. R. Babu
- V. Nagendra Prasad as an astrologer
- Pavan Kumar as Pavan Kumar, tyre repair shop owner
- Michael Madhu as pirated CD vendor
- Kuri Prathap as flower vendor
- Sihi Kahi Geetha as Sumithra, Yogaraj's mother
- Amrutha
- Chandrakala

== Music ==
Yogaraj But

Soundtrack album by Milind Dharmasena
- Released: 2011
- Recorded: 2011
- Genre: Feature film soundtrack
- Length: 25:51
- Language: Kannada

Official audio
- Yogaraj But - Full Album on YouTube

Milind Dharmasena scored music for the film's background and its soundtrack.

Track listing
| No. | Title | Singer(s) | Length |
|---|---|---|---|
| 1. | "Sunaka Sunana" | Tippu, Chaitra H. G. | 4:44 |
| 2. | "Sukumari" | Vijay Prakash | 5:23 |
| 3. | "Sihiyagide" | Karthik | 5:13 |
| 4. | "Bhagavanta" | Meghana | 5:16 |
| 5. | "Sunaka Sunana" | Naveen Krishna | 4:44 |
| 6. | "Nanu Nanna Kanasu" | Neetoo | 1:11 |
| Total length: | | | 25:51 |

== Reception ==
=== Critical response ===
Shruti Indira Lakshminarayan from Rediff.com scored the film at 2 out of 5 stars and says "A fine actor like Sreenivasa Murthy settles for the role of a sanyasi who is meant to be scary, but doesn't quite pull it off. If Tharun Sudheer as the god of death, Yama, is meant to give us goose-bumps, well, he doesn't. Dayal has claimed that this is the best film he has done, but viewers might think that is not saying much". A critic from The New Indian Express wrote, "Had the director avoided such incongruous sequences, Yogaraj But would have been a neat and good entertainer. Among the artistes, Neethu has done a decent job. Her gestures and dialogue delivery are good". B. S. Srivani from Deccan Herald wrote, "Milind Dharmasena comes up with two good compositions and cinematographer B Rakesh and team does a good job along with the art department. Yogaraj But... could have been an excellent film but..."

Sunayana Suresh from DNA wrote, "Just when you think all is well, Yogaraj dies in an accident. The film takes a twist when he convinces ‘God’ to send him back to earth. And there's the indigestible plot that follows through. The film has some good performances from lead actors Naveen and Neettoo". A critic from News18 India wrote, "Yogaraj, But is a different type of film. But it is enjoyable to the core, and there is also a thought provoking element in the film. Watch it". A critic from The Times of India scored the film at 3.5 out of 5 stars and says " Naveen Krishna's understated acting and brilliant dialogue-delivery win your heart though it is Neethu who steals the show. Cinematography by B Rakesh is beautiful while Milind Dharmasena's melodious numbers linger in your mind long after the movie is over".
