= 5 Idiots =

- Directed by: Master Anand
- Written by: Vasu
- Based on: Darwaaza Bandh Rakho (2006)
- Produced by: Lokesh Murthy; Shiva Reddy M V Mohan
- Starring: Master Anand; Naveen Krishna; Vasu; Harshika Poonacha
- Cinematography: Renu Kumar
- Edited by: M. Muniraj
- Music by: Drums Deva
- Production company: Shwetha Creations
- Release date: 18 February 2011
- Running time: 141 minutes
- Country: India
- Language: Kannada

5 Idiots is a 2011 Indian Kannada language comedy film directed by Master Anand making his debut in direction. Besides Anand, the film stars Vasu, Naveen Krishna, Petrol Prasanna, Harshika Poonacha and Namratha Hegde in the lead roles. It is a remake of Hindi film Darwaaza Bandh Rakho (2006) starring Aftab Shivdasani, Isha Sharvani and Manisha Koirala.

The film released on 18 February 2011 across Karnataka. Upon release, the film generally met with average reviews from the critics and audience.

== Cast ==
- Master Anand
- Naveen Krishna
- Petrol Prasanna
- Vasu
- Harshika Poonacha
- Namratha Hegde
- Navyashree
- Karibasavaiah
- Mimicry Dayanand
- Tennis Krishna
- Bank Janardhan
- Chidanand
- Shille Manjunath as Bomb Babu

== Soundtrack ==
5 Idiots

Soundtrack album by Drums Deva
- Released: 8 February 2011
- Genre: Feature film soundtrack
- Length: 19:29
- Label: Anand Audio

Drums Deva has composed totally 3 songs out of which "Ringa Ringa" is copied from Telugu film, Aarya 2 and "Jingichaka" is from Pournami and "Suvarna Suvarna" is also copied from Girl Friend.

Track listing
No.	Title	Singer(s)	Length
1.	"Suvarna Suvarna"	Hemanth Kumar	4:46
2.	"Jingichaka Jingichaka"	Ashok Sharma, Anuradha Bhat	4:50
3.	"Ringa Ringa"	Master Anand, Naveen Krishna, Sunitha Goparaju, Gururaj Hoskote	4:56
4.	"Ringa Ringa"	Sunitha Goparaju, Gururaj Hoskote	4:57
Total length:			19:29

== Reception ==
=== Critical response ===
A critic from Bangalore Mirror wrote "A case in point is the 'talking God' in the first few scenes — totally disconnected to the rest of the film. His first film as a director is just as raw as his tele-serials. He should remember that the roles that made him a child-star in films of the last century were made of sterner stuff". Sunayana Suresh from DNA wrote " Vasu, Naveen Krishna, Master Anand, Petrol Prasanna and Namrata — hatching a kidnap plan for quick money, a take on many gangster flicks like Kaante and Plan. The story then revolves around a series of misadventures that happen in one house". A critic from Sify.com wrote "Except for seasoned performers like Naveen Krishna and Harshitha Poonacha, all the other artistes either overacted or did not perform well. '5 Idiots' is eminently watchable if you can laugh at even illogical and poorly-written lengthier sequences".
