= Kadamba (2004 film) =

- Film poster
- Directed by: Suresh Krissna
- Written by: Universal Films
- Based on: Thanga Pathakkam (Tamil)
- Produced by: D. Kamalakar; M. B. Babu
- Starring: Vishnuvardhan; Bhanupriya; Naveen Krishna
- Cinematography: Ramesh Babu
- Edited by: Shyam Yadav
- Music by: Deva
- Production company: Universal Films
- Release date: 16 January 2004
- Running time: 156 minutes
- Country: India
- Language: Kannada

Kadamba is a 2004 Indian Kannada-language action drama film starring Vishnuvardhan, Bhanupriya and Naveen Krishna. The film is directed and written by director Suresh Krissna, making his debut in Kannada cinema and features soundtrack by Deva. The film is inspired by the 1974 Tamil movie Thanga Pathakkam.

Released on 16 January 2004, the film met with mixed response. It was an average at the box office, however later gained appreciation from the audience after making its television premiere in Udaya TV, especially from Vishnuvardhan fans.

== Cast ==
- Vishnuvardhan as Madhukeshawara Kadamba
- Bhanupriya as Yaamini
- Naveen Krishna as Rajashekar alias Raju
- Rekha Kumar as Uma, Raju’s wife
- Tharun as Sharat Chandra
- Ramesh Bhat as Ramesh
- Chi. Guru Dutt as Jaya Chandra
- Avinash as Deputy Chief Minister
- Rockline Venkatesh as Rockline
- Srinivasa Murthy as Srinivasaiah (Special Appearance)
- Sathyapriya as Kadamba's teacher (Special Appearance)
- Anantha Velu
- Shivaram

== Production ==
The film was launched on 31 August 2003 at Hotel Ashok in Bangalore. During his interaction with the media, Vishnuvardhan who was cast as a cop, stated, "I have a special love for police uniform. I am playing a cop after four years and I always remember my grandfather who was a CID in the erstwhile Wodeyar kingdom, whenever I wear the uniform. Perhaps, that explains my love towards wearing the police colours." He added that the film was about a father-son relationship that runs into rough weather following small misunderstandings. It was announced that he would play the father and Naveen Krishna, his son. It was revealed that Bhanupriya was cast opposite to him, and that Avinash would play the role of a Home Minister, Ramesh Bhat, a trusted friend and Chi. Guru Dutt, a trouble shooter to Vishnuvardhan's character.

== Soundtrack ==
All the songs are composed and scored by Deva. One of the songs "Sangathiye" is based on "Oru Pen Pura", composed by Deva for Annaamalai (1992). The song "Chukki Chukki" was partly based on Deva's own Tamil song "Oh Nandini" from the Tamil film Oruvan (1999) while "Baala Gopalana" is partly based on Deva's own Malayalam song "Shyamame" from Malayalam film The Prince (1996), both these films were directed by Krissna.

Deva later reused "Banda Nodamma" as "Gaja Varanda" for Tamil film Gajendra (2004) also directed by Suresh Krissna.

Sl No	Song title	Singer(s)	Lyrics
1	"Yamini Yaramma Neenu"	S. P. Balasubrahmanyam, K. S. Chithra	K. Kalyan
2	"Sangathiye Kannalli"	S. P. Balasubrahmanyam	K. Kalyan
3	"Chukki Chukki"	S. P. Balasubrahmanyam, K. S. Chithra	K. Kalyan
4	"Baala Gopalana"	Kavita Krishnamurthy	K. Kalyan
5	"Banda Nodamma"	B. Jayashree	K. Kalyan
6	"Pancha Koti Kannadigare"	S. P. Balasubrahmanyam	K. Kalyan

== Critical reception ==
A critic from Deccan Herald wrote that "Producers M B Babu and Kamalakar who made successful films like Soorappa and Kotigobba have tried to do a mishmash of Vishnu’s earlier films to relieve him of his feudal lord image but at the same time give him a macho image through the film". A critic from Chitraloka.com wrote that "Here in this neat package for family and fans this director gives a trouble free film. From the fountain of thought of a director there is a very much needed respite for Kannada audience. In the days of bizarre of ‘Chaku Churi Guns and Bombs’ culture on screen ‘Kadamba’ stands out for its brilliance in screenplay, acting, cinematography and music department". A critic from Viggy wrote that "In a nutshell, Kadamba is truly a 'Habba' (transl. festival) to watch on the screen".
