= Farz Aur Kanoon =

Farz Aur Kaanoon
- Theatrical release poster
- Directed by: K. Raghavendra Rao
- Written by: Kader Khan (dialogues)
- Screenplay by: K. Raghavendra Rao
- Story by: Mahendran
- Based on: Thangappathakkam (Tamil)
- Produced by: M. Arjuna Raju; A. S. R. Anjineelu
- Starring: Jeetendra; Hema Malini; Rati Agnihotri
- Cinematography: K. S. Prakash
- Edited by: Kotagiri Venkateswara Rao
- Music by: Laxmikant–Pyarelal
- Production company: Roja Movies
- Release date: 6 August 1982
- Running time: 161 minutes
- Country: India
- Language: Hindi

Farz aur Kaanoon (transl. Duty and Law) is a 1982 Indian Hindi-language action film, produced by M. Arjuna Raju and A. S. R. Anjineelu under the Roja Movies banner and directed by K. Raghavendra Rao. It stars Jeetendra, Hema Malini, Rati Agnihotri in the pivotal roles and music composed by Laxmikant–Pyarelal. The film is a remake of producer -director duo's own Telugu movie Kondaveeti Simham (1981) starring N. T. Rama Rao, Sridevi which itself was a remake of the 1974 Tamil movie Thanga Pathakkam, which incidentally went on to inspire another Hindi movie in 1982 itself – Shakti.

The film was recorded a "Super Hit" at the box office.

== Plot ==
For Inspector Ranjit Kumar, fulfilling his duty and protecting the law are the only aims of his life, he and Bharti are paired as Ram and Sita of the present age. After their first child is a stillborn, Bharti gives birth to their son Ravi, whom they have high hopes for. From childhood, Ravi begins smoking, gambling, and robbing. His parents admit him to a hostel, but he runs away. Ranjit finds him but, disappointed with his son, conceals this information from Bharti who is heartbroken.

Ranjit Kumar's first son, whom Bharti's father had handed over to a maid-servant Ganga so that Bharti's marriage could not get disturbed, now had grown to a youth in a village and his name is Ramu. Ramu comes to the town - he saves Major Gopal's daughter - Poonam twice from the road Romeos and because of Major Gopal, he comes in contact with Ranjit and Bharti, his parents. Ravi also grew up and returned home, he blamed Ranjit Kumar for all the calamities that he had to face. On one side, Ranjit was on his mission to finish off those people who were working against his country and on the other hand, Ravi joined them and started creating problems for Ranjit. Even though Bharti loved Ravi, Ravi loved the unlawful life, whereas Ranjit Kumar loved his duty and law. Everyone's thoughts differed, so how could they stay under one roof? On this, Ravi left his house. And of this grief, Bharti had a paralysis attack. Bharti had become weak due to the separation of Ravi, at her last moment Ganga the maidservant comes out with the secret of Ramu being her elder son. Bharti was glad, but her time was just near to completion. Before her last breath, she took the promise from Ramu that he must break down the wall that stood between his younger brother Ravi and his father. How does Ramu fulfill his mother's last wish? How does he bring back Ravi from amongst the bad man? How does he put Ranjit Kumar and Ravi together?

== Cast ==
- Jeetendra as S.P. Ranjit Kumar / Ramu (Dual Role)
- Hema Malini as Bharati
- Rati Agnihotri as Poonam
- Raj Kiran as Ravi
- Kader Khan as Naagraj
- Asrani as Sitapati
- Prem Chopra as Major Gopal
- Shakti Kapoor
- Bharat Bhushan
- Sharat Saxena
- Geetha as Padma

== Soundtrack ==
Lyrics: Anand Bakshi

| Song | Singer |
|---|---|
| "Naujawan" | Kishore Kumar, Asha Bhosle |
| "Mere Ghar Ka" | Kishore Kumar, Asha Bhosle |
| "Jab Tak Pyar" | Asha Bhosle, Shabbir Kumar |
| "Dil Ko Zara Sambhalo" | Asha Bhosle, Shabbir Kumar, Suresh Wadkar |
