= Madhura Swapna =

- Theatrical release poster
- Directed by: Ravirathnam Karamala
- Written by: Ravirathnam Karamala
- Produced by: H M Sanjeev Kumar
- Starring: Arjun Kapikad; Keerthana Podwal
- Edited by: E S Eshwar
- Music by: Ravikalyan
- Distributed by: Thugudeepa Production
- Release date: 19 February 2016
- Country: India
- Language: Kannada

Madhura Swapna is a 2016 Kannada language film. It is directed by Ravirathnam Karamala starring Arjun Kapikad and Keerthana Podwal in the lead roles, and Vinaya Prasad, Avinash, Ashok, Mukhyamantri Chandru, and Ramakrishna in supporting roles.

The film was released on 19 February 2016.

== Cast ==
- Arjun Kapikad
- Keerthana Podwal
- Vinaya Prasad
- Avinash
- Ashok
- Mukhyamantri Chandru
- Ramakrishna

== Production ==
As of November 2015, post-production of the film was complete.

== Soundtrack ==
Music was composed by Ravikalyan.

== Release ==
The film was caught up in a technical glitch when ticketing booking site Book My Show showed 'Unavailable' or 'Sold Out' to theaters that were actually empty for this film as well as Actor and Bhale Jodi.
