= Dilwale =

Dilwale may refer to:

- Dilwale (1994 film), a 1994 Bollywood film starring Ajay Devgn and Sunil Shetty
- Dilwale (2015 film), a 2015 Bollywood film starring Shah Rukh Khan, Kajol, Varun Dhawan and Kriti Sanon

== See also ==
- Dilwala, 2013 Indian film
- Dilwale Dulhania Le Jayenge, a 1995 Bollywood musical romance film
