= Sri Harikathe =

- Directed by: Dayal Padmanabhan
- Written by: Dayal Padmanabhan
- Produced by: S. A. Chinne Gowda; M. N. Kumar
- Starring: Sri Murali; Pooja Gandhi; Radhika Gandhi
- Cinematography: B. Rakesh
- Edited by: Jhony Harsha
- Music by: Sameer Kulkarni
- Production company: C. K. Films
- Release date: 12 March 2010
- Running time: 145 minutes
- Country: India
- Language: Kannada

Sri Harikathe is a 2010 Indian Kannada language romantic thriller film directed by Dayal Padmanabhan. The film stars Sri Murali, Pooja Gandhi, Radhika Gandhi and Naveen Krishna in pivotal roles. The film is jointly produced by S. A. Chinne Gowda and M. N. Kumar.

The film release co-coincided with another Sri Murali film Sihigaali on 12 March 2010.

== Plot ==
Hari (Sriimurali), a young businessman and Prakruthi (Radhika Gandhi), a PhD student at the Singapore university love each other and get married. However, Prakruthi insists that they start the family only after she submits and completes her thesis. Hari agrees to the condition for about 6 months. Later again, Prakruthi asks for 3 more months time until she gets prepared to start a family. This makes the couple clash and Prakruthi leaves for an educational trip abroad. Meanwhile, Hari brings a celebrity model Pooja Krishnamurthy (Pooja) home and Prakruthi finds them getting cosy after which the celebrity is seen murdered. The rest of the plot deals with the "who-done-it" and the mystery around the celebrity's death.

== Cast ==
- Srimurali as Hari
- Pooja Gandhi as Pooja Krishnamurthy
- Radhika Gandhi as Prakruthi
- Naveen Krishna as Ram
- Srinivasa Murthy
- Sihi Kahi Chandru
- Padmaja Rao
- Sihi Kahi Geetha
- Achyutha Kumar
- Nagashekar
- Shille Manjunath as Prakruthi's younger brother

== Production ==
Sisters Pooja Gandhi and Radhika Gandhi acted together for the first time with this film. The entire filming got completed in 45 days at a stretch. The main filming took place across the Coastal part of Karnataka namely Mangalore and Surathkal. It was revealed by the director that the film would be a thriller with the lead actress Pooja having some grey shades in her character.

== Soundtrack ==
All the songs are composed and scored by Sameer Kulkarni. The track list consists of 6 songs written by actor Naveen Krishna, Yogaraj Bhat, Nagathihalli Chandrashekar, M. L. Prasanna among others.

Sl No	Song title	Singer(s)	Lyrics
1	"Sari Sari Illellavu"	Kunal Ganjawala, Inchara Rao	Naveen Krishna
2	"Summane Ninnanu"	Rajesh Krishnan, Sumanth	Yogaraj Bhat
3	"Jodi Jeevagale"	Vijay Prakash	Nagathihalli Chandrashekar
4	"Hari Hari Katheyu"	Naveen Krishna	Naveen Krishna
5	"Maadabeda"	Inchara	Sameer Kulkarni
6	"Hari Kathe Theme"	Sameer Kulkarni, Sumanth	Sameer Kulkarni

== Reception ==
=== Critical response ===
Shruti Indira Lakshminarayana of Rediff.com scored the film at 3 out of 5 stars and says "While the first half moves quickly, the movie stretches towards the end. The story is preachy but in a comical way. A scene where Pooja and Radhika hug each other despite being the 'other woman' and wife is however hard to digest. The onscreen sisterly act could have been done away with too. Watch Shriharikathe if you can ignore some of the 'machismo' dialogues that reflect gender stereo types in our society". A critic from Bangalore Mirror wrote "Naveen Krishna as the womaniser delivers a brilliant performance. His presence takes his scenes to a higher level. The rest of the characters, though not impressive, pass the test. The visuals do not strain the eyes and the music does not hamper the ears. So a movie you can safely plan to spend some time on". B S Srivani from Deccan Herald wrote "The biggest disappointment comes from watching Navin Krishna - why is this actor still on the sidelines? If the leisurely pace can be tolerated, “Sriharikathe” is an easy favourite pastime".
