= Bhale Jodi =

Bhale Jodi may refer to:

- Bhale Jodi (1970 film), an Indian Kannada-language drama film
- Bhale Jodi (2016 film), an Indian Kannada-language romantic comedy film
