= Aata (2011 film) =

2011 Indian Kannada-language film

- Directed by: B N Vijaykumar
- Written by: Shashank
- Produced by: Shailendra Babu
- Starring: Sumanth Shailendra; Vibha Natarajan
- Cinematography: N Raghav
- Edited by: K M Prakash
- Music by: Sadhu Kokila
- Release date: 18 November 2011
- Country: India
- Language: Kannada

Aata is a 2011 Indian Kannada-language masala film directed by B N Vijaykumar and produced by Shailendra Babu. It stars debutants Sumanth Shailendra and Vibha Natarajan in lead roles. The music was composed by Sadhu Kokila, while cinematography and editing were handled by N. Raghav and K. M. Prakash.

== Plot ==
Rahul, a football player living with his middle-class family consisting of his mother, father and sister Sandhya, comes across a video of Swathi due to some mix-up in a CD shop. Swathi is the daughter of Rajashekhar, a rich business tycoon and the sister of Rahul's football rival Vikram. After initial misunderstandings, Rahul and Swathi bond well and decide to marry, but Rahul wants the approval of their parents before they take any decisions.

During this time, Sandhya elopes with her boyfriend on the day of her marriage, which completely shatters his parents. Swathi stays in Rahul's house, posing as Sandhya's friend, as Rajashekhar fixed her marriage with his friend's son Srikanth. Learning that Swathi has fallen for someone, Rajashekhar hires "Silent" Shankar, a contract killer, to bring Swathi.

Rahul decides to receive Swathi's parents approval for their proposal and enters into their house without revealing anything, where he bonds with the rest of the family, including Vikram. However, Shankar finds Rahul's identity and reports it to Rajashekhar, who angrily throws Rahul out of the house and takes Swathi away. After many efforts, Rahul kills Shankar in a fight and finally receive their parents' approval and get married happily.

== Cast ==
- Sumanth Shailendra as Rahul
- Vibha Natarajan as Swathi
- Pradeep as Vikram
- Avinash as Rajashekhar, Swathi's father
- Padmaja Rao as Saraswati, Rahul's mother
- Achyuth Kumar as Subramanya, Rahul's father
- Pavithra Lokesh as Kanchana, Swathi's mother
- Sadhu Kokila as a football coach
- Shankar Rao as "Silent" Shankar

== Music ==
Aata

Soundtrack album by Sadhu Kokila
- Released: 2011
- Recorded: 2011
- Genre: Feature film soundtrack
- Length: 36:28
- Language: Kannada

Official audio
- Aata - Full Album on YouTube

Track listing
No.	Title	Singer(s)	Length
1.	"Ninninda"	Shreya Ghoshal, Sonu Nigam	4:20
2.	"Rama Raama"	Chinmayi, Kailash Kher	4:44
3.	"Onde Samane"	Shreya Ghoshal	5:20
4.	"Lifealli Gelloke"	Tippu	4:32
5.	"Onde Samane"	Shreya Ghoshal, Sonu Nigam	4:49
6.	"Idhu Love"	Chinmayi, Ranjith	3:59
7.	"Onde Samane"	Sonu Nigam	5:20
8.	"He Yavva"	Kunal Ganjawala, Shreya Ghoshal	4:44
Total length:			36:28

== Reception ==
=== Critical response ===
The New Indian Express wrote "The script by Shashank has many shades of other language films and it moves on the predictable lines. It is worth watching if you have patience to cope with its lengthy climax." News18 wrote "Shailendra Babu has put in all efforts and loads of money to provide a dream debut to his son Sumanth, but the film mainly suffers because of bad narration."

BSS from Deccan Herald wrote "Shashank’s story keeps the audience engrossed but the lengthy climax jars a bit." Bangalore Mirror wrote "Despite a good plot, the final outcome of the film leaves a lot to be desired."
