= Chikkamagaloora Chikka Mallige =

2008 Indian Kannada-language film

- DVD cover
- Directed by: E. Channagangappa
- Written by: E. Channagangappa
- Starring: Shravanth; Radhika Gandhi; Jagadish
- Cinematography: J. G. Krishna
- Edited by: R. D. Ravi
- Music by: K. Kalyan
- Release date: 10 October 2008
- Country: India
- Language: Kannada

Chikkamagaloora Chikka Mallige (transl. Chikkamagalore's jasmine) is a 2008 Indian Kannada-language romantic drama film directed by E. Channagangappa and starring newcomers Shravanth, Radhika Gandhi and Jagadish. The film's title is based on a song from Shiva Sainya (1996). The film's story is based on one of Rabindranath Tagore's short stories. The film was an average success.

== Cast ==
- Shravanth as Surya
- Radhika Gandhi as Vasundhara
- Jagadish
- C. R. Simha as the king
- Bharath Bhagavathar
- Avinash
- Master Anand
- Sharath Lohitashwa
- Karibasavaiah
- Vinaya Prasad
- Rudresh
- R. G. Vijayasarathy

== Music ==
The music was composed by K. Kalyan.

Tracklist
| No. | Title | Singer(s) | Length |
|---|---|---|---|
| 1. | "Cheluvige Chuluvu" | Bharath, Shruti Srinath | 5:11 |
| 2. | "Ho Vasundara" | Chinmai, Priyadarshini Ram | 5:30 |
| 3. | "Malenaada Soundryakke" | Shruti Srinath | 5:01 |
| 4. | "Neene Bareda Premageethe" | Rajesh Krishnan | 4:11 |
| 5. | "Neenirada Veleyalli (Female)" | Nitin Rajaram, Sri Priya | 6:01 |
| 6. | "Tirugo Bhoomi Tirugabeeda" | Aishwarya Kalyan, Badri Prasad | 5:39 |
| 7. | "Tumbida Chandranege" | Ajay Warriar | 4:43 |
| Total length: | | | 36:16 |

== Reception ==
R. G. Vijayasarathy from IANS wrote that "Chikkamagaloora Chikka Mallige is a neat entertainer". A critic from Rediff.com wrote that "All in all, Chikkamagaloora Chikkamallige has engaging and entertaining moments to appeal to the family audience". A critic from Bangalore Mirror wrote that "The beautiful locals and some passable music by K Kalyan are the only noteworthy features of Chikkamagalura Chikkamallige". A critic from Chitraloka wrote that "Totally, CMCM is a healthy family entertainer which needs to be encouraged for its novel presentation".
