= Vrithra =

- Directed by: R Gautham
- Written by: R Gautham
- Produced by: Lalitha; Shambulingayya Swami; Rajwant Singh
- Starring: Nithya Shri
- Cinematography: Auditya Venkatesh
- Edited by: EM Arun
- Music by: DA Vasantha
- Release date: 11 October 2019
- Country: India
- Language: Kannada

Vrithra is a 2019 Indian Kannada-language crime drama film written and directed by R Gautham . The film has been bankrolled by Lalitha, Shambulingayya Swami and Rajwant Singh. The film stars Nithya Shri while Prakash Belawadi and Sudha Rani appear in supporting roles.

Photographer Auditya Venkatesh has worked as the cinematographer for Vrithra while EM Arun and DA Vasantha have handled the editing and the music departments respectively.

== Plot ==
Investigation officer Indra Rao (Nithya Shri) comes across a series of conspicuous clues as she immerses herself in a seemingly open and shut case. However, as the story progresses, she is left to make a difficult choice-her career or the truth. The story involves a metaphor between the contemporary Bengaluru transforming into a jungle ruled by animals.

Indra Rao is a sub-inspector who initially deals with ordinary crimes in the city, from petty offenses to nuisance. However, she is handed over a suicide case, which she considers ordinary at the beginning due to the number of people committing suicide in the city in a daily basis. Her uncle Prakash Belawadi explains to her that she is trapped in a complex chess game where she doesn't have any clue of who her opponents are. When she goes to find the truth behind the suicide, she finds that the Vrithra is not what she thinks he is but someone who is trying to remove the boundaries in society. The hoarders in society that have all the resources are the actual Vrithra, and she has to make a choice between letting her higher-ranked officer know that she is trying to make things right.

== Cast ==
- Nithya Shri as Indra Rao
- Prakash Belawadi as Indra Rao's uncle
- Sudha Rani
- Ravi Sitaraman (K.J. Ravi)
- Tharun Sudhir

== Production ==
The movie was launched with Rashmika Mandanna as the lead protagonist. However, the makers later replaced her with stage artist Nithya Shri.

The trailer of Vrithra was released on 3 October 2019. The movie has been censored with 'U' certificate and is slated to release on 11 October 2019.

== Reception ==
A critic from the Deccan Chronicle wrote that "If you are one of those serious minds, who look for quality in what's inside than the glittery package on the outside, then go watch this interesting demon being unraveled". A critic from The Hindu wrote that "Though the film starts promisingly, the final reveal ends up as a damp squib". A critic from The Times of India wrote that "The main premise of the story is not new and director Gautham throws in plot points that are not addressed well. For a debutant, though, he deserves a pat on the back for the attempt to try something different in terms of the execution". A critic from Deccan Herald wrote that "As a thriller, ‘Vrithra’ is decent if not great. You see the big reveal coming from a distance". A critic from The New Indian Express wrote that "Gautham undoubtedly keeps the audience guessing every minute of his debut film". A critic from the Bangalore Mirror wrote that "A neat package that a discerning audience should not miss".
