= Tirupathi Express =

2014 Kannada language film

- Directed by: P Kumar
- Written by: Ravichandra N
- Screenplay by: P Kumar
- Story by: Merlapaka Gandhi
- Based on: Venkatadri Express
- Produced by: Shailendra Babu
- Starring: Sumanth Shailendra; Kriti Kharbanda
- Narrated by: Sharan
- Cinematography: J.S. Wali
- Edited by: Jo.Ni. Harsha
- Music by: Arjun Janya
- Production company: Sree Shailendra Productions
- Release date: 5 September 2014
- Running time: 126 minutes
- Country: India
- Language: Kannada

Tirupathi Express is a 2014 Kannada language romantic comedy film starring Sumanth Shailendra and Kriti Kharbanda. The film was written and directed by P Kumar and produced by Shailendra Babu. The film is an official remake of the Telugu movie Venkatadri Express.

== Cast ==
- Sumanth Shailendra as Sumanth
- Kriti Kharbanda as Prathana
- Ashok as Srinivas Rao
- Sumithra as Lakshmi, Srinivas Rao wife
- Naveen Krishna as Mohana
- Kuri Prathap as Sangya Patil
- Chikkanna as Mandya Malya, Auto Driver
- Sadhu Kokila as Indrajaala
- Bullet Prakash
- Sihi Kahi Chandru as Ticket Collector
- Sharath Lohithaswa
- Ninasam Ashwath
- Lakshmi Hegde as Kasturi, Srinivasa Rao daughter
- Sathyajith as Police Inspector
- Mandeep Roy as Snake-Charmer
- Sharan as himself, narrator of the movie

== Soundtrack ==
Tirupathi Express

Soundtrack album by Arjun Janya
- Released: 2014
- Recorded: 2014
- Genre: Feature film soundtrack
- Length: 9:10
- Label: Anand Audio

Arjun Janya chronology
Varadhanayaka (2013)	Tirupathi Express (2014)	Adyaksha (2014)

The movie featured two songs composed by Arjun Janya, released under the Anand Audio label on 2 July 2014.

No.	Title	Lyrics	Singer(s)	Length
1.	"Naanu Righta"	V. Nagendra Prasad	Puneeth Rajkumar	4:32
2.	"Usire Usire Vandisu"	K. Kalyan	Karthik, Chinmayi	4:38
