= Bettanagere =

- Directed by: Mohan Gowda Bettanagere
- Screenplay by: Mohan Gowda Bettanagere
- Story by: Mohan Gowda Bettanagere
- Produced by: B. N. Swamy
- Starring: Sumanth Shailendra; Akshay; Vinod Kambli
- Cinematography: Venu H. C.
- Edited by: Jo. Ni. Harsha
- Music by: Rajesh Ramanath
- Release date: 30 October 2015
- Running time: 125 minutes
- Country: India
- Language: Kannada

Bettanagere is a 2015 Indian Kannada crime thriller film written and directed by Mohan Gowda Bettanagere. It is a fictional exposé of the underworld cousin goons Bethanagere Seena and Bethanagere Shankara who are based in the North Bangalore region called Bethanagere. The film is produced by B. N. Swamy and the music is composed by Rajesh Ramanath. The film stars Sumanth Shailendra and Akshay as the goon brothers along with former cricketer Vinod Kambli in a special supporting role.

Although the film went on floors in October 2013, it had to face many legal troubles and halts during the making. The filming had to be halted and it was reported that the film was dropped. The film eventually underwent a revival and resumed the shoot towards the completion in early 2015. However, the film had to settle for a record 139 edits from the censor board making it the first Kannada film with such large cuts.

== Cast ==
- Akshay as Shekara
- Sumanth Shailendra as Shiva
- Naina Sarwar
- Vinod Kambli
- Muniraj
- Shobaraj
- Avinash
- Achyuth Kumar
- Bullet Prakash
- Yathiraj
- Killer Venkatesh
- Veena Sundar
- Ramnitu Chaudhary as item number "Bandi Bandi"

== Soundtrack ==
The soundtrack is composed by Rajesh Ramanath. The audio was launched by director Ram Gopal Varma in Bangalore's Chamundeshwari Studios. Varma was in town for shooting his film Killing Veerappan. The lyrics of the song "Bandi Bandi" came under the scrutiny of the censor board and the entire lyrics had to be changed for the final approval.

=== Track listing ===
No.	Title	Lyrics	Singer(s)	Length
1.	"Bandi Bandi"	V. Nagendra Prasad	Mamta Sharma
2.	"Neeli Neeli"		Rajesh Krishnan, Anuradha Bhat
3.	"Harakeya Thandevamma"		Kailash Kher
4.	"Neeli Neeli"		Kunal Ganjawala, Anuradha Bhat
5.	"Bethanagere Theme"		Santhosh Venky
