= Darwaaza Bandh Rakho =

Darwaza Bandh Rakho
- Theatrical release poster
- Directed by: J. D. Chakravarthy
- Written by: Snehal Dabi (dialogues)
- Screenplay by: J. D. Chakravarthy
- Story by: Micky
- Produced by: Ram Gopal Varma
- Starring: Aftab Shivdasani; Isha Sharvani; Manisha Koirala; Chunky Pandey; Zakir Hussain; Snehal Dabi; Divya Dutta; Gulshan Grover; Aditya Srivastava
- Cinematography: Chota K. Naidu
- Edited by: Bhanodaya
- Distributed by: RGV Film Company
- Release date: 4 August 2006
- Running time: 106 minutes
- Country: India
- Language: Hindi
- Budget: ₹3.75 crore
- Box office: ₹2.32 crore

Darwaza Bandh Rakho (transl. Keep the Door Shut) is an Indian Hindi-language black comedy film directed by J. D. Chakravarthy, cinematography by Chota K. Naidu and released in 2006. The film was remade in Telugu in 2011 as Money Money, More Money, with J.D. Chakravarthy playing the lead role and in Kannada as 5 Idiots.

== Synopsis ==
Four small-time crooks turn towards kidnapping for some quick money. They kidnap a millionaire's daughter, Isha Taneja, and demand money (1 crore). They are forced to barge into the home of a vegetarian Gujarati family of 35.

Their stay in the house gets extended when they learn that the hostage's father has gone abroad, and they have to wait until he returns. The kidnappers are forced to take more hostages to keep their identities secret and prevent the kidnapping venture from failing. Eventually, other people are stuck in the house, such as a pizza guy, a police constable, a salesgirl, a guy who wants money from Kantilal, and a real estate guy. What follows is a "mad-mad comedy of errors."

Taneja finally appears; he gives the four kidnappers the money; however, there is now a fight between the four, and then Taneja calls the police. The kidnappers go to the court. Isha says Ajay, Goga, and Raghu are innocent but not Abbas. After 16 months, Ajay owns a hotel and works with Mughale Azam; Isha and Ajay are both friends; Julie works with Raghu on the sales business; Goga is an auto driver, Ganpat Kale is not a policeman but an instructor in a driving school ; Abbaas goes to jail; and the Shah residence lives happily ever after.

== Cast ==
- Aftab Shivdasani as Ajay 'Balu' Pandit
- Chunky Pandey as Raghuveer 'Raghu' Achrekar
- Zakir Hussain as Mohammad Abbas Ali
- Aditya Srivastav as Inspector
- Snehal Dabi as Govind 'Goga' Gawde / Narrator
- Isha Sharvani as Isha Taneja
- Manisha Koirala as Julie - CISCO Salesgirl
- Ishrat Ali as Kantilal Shantilal Shah
- Smita Jaykar as Sarita K. Shah
- Gulshan Grover as Taneja
- Tashu Kaushik as Sheeba K. Shah
- Ravi Kale as Havaldar Ganpat Kale
- Divya Dutta as Chameli G. Kale
- Goga Kapoor as Manish Mehta - Real Estate Agent
- Nitin Raikwar as Madhusudan 'Mugaleazam' - Pizza Boy
- Anupam Shyam as Police Inspector
- Srinivasa Rao Kota as Dr. Mukala Umapathi Kutti
- Pramod Moutho as Dinesh Duggal - Secretary
- Raju Mavani as Mushtaqbhai Pathan
- Javed Rizvi as Arvind S. Shetty
- Padma Rani as Mrs. Shah 'Ba'
- Vijay Shah as Ponky K. Shah

== Soundtrack ==
| No. | Title | Singer(s) | Length |
|---|---|---|---|
| 1. | "Darwaza Khulega Kismat Ka" | Nitin Raikwar |
| 2. | "Golimaar" | Guru Randhawa |

== Reception ==
The movie was tagged as a "thrilling comedy"; other reviewers regarded it as an innovative theme that "ran out of steam" midway into the plot. The performance was regarded as "lackluster", Acting was mediocre and people who watched said that the actors tried "too hard" to make people laugh but failed miserably. The movie was box office failure.
