= Vamshodharaka =

- Directed by: Aditya Chikkanna
- Written by: Chandrachar Kumar
- Produced by: Om Shri Kalikamatha Productions; Aravind Rathasaptami
- Starring: Vijay Raghavendra; Meghana Raj
- Cinematography: PKH Das
- Edited by: S. Manohar
- Music by: V. Manohar
- Production company: Om Shri Kalikamatha Productions
- Release date: 6 November 2015
- Country: India
- Language: Kannada

Vamshodharaka is a 2015 Indian Kannada language family drama film directed by Aditya Chikkanna and produced by actor Aravind Rathasapthami. The film stars Vijay Raghavendra and Meghana Raj in the lead roles.

Reported to be a rural family entertainer, the principal photography of the film began in October 2014. The film was released on 6 November 2015.

== Cast ==
- Vijay Raghavendra as Vishwa
- Meghana Raj
- Naveen Krishna
- Rangayana Raghu
- Sadhu Kokila
- Lakshmi
- Vinaya Prasad
- Srinivasa Murthy
- M. N. Lakshmi Devi
- Dingri Nagaraj
- Sathyajith
- Vaijanath Biradar
- Sanketh Kashi
- Veena Sundar

== Soundtrack ==
Vamshodharaka

Soundtrack album by V. Manohar
- Genre: Feature film soundtrack
- Language: Kannada
- Label: Anand Audio

The music for the film and soundtracks are composed by V. Manohar. The album has five soundtracks.

Track listing
No.	Title	Lyrics	Singer(s)	Length
1.	"Hayagi Haraadi"	Ghouse Peer	Sonu Nigam, Anuradha Bhat
2.	"Alemaneyange"	Gooturi	Chinthan Vikas, Supriya Lohith
3.	"Natha Natha"	Gooturi	Chinthan Vikas
4.	"Vamshada Gourava"	K. Kalyan	Bharani Shree
5.	"Raitha Bhoomiya"	K. Kalyan	Madhu Balakrishnan

== Reception ==
A critic from The Times of India wrote that "While the casting is right and the story, in the larger picture, makes for a decent one-time watch, the 152-minute screen time tends to look longer by the end".
