= Kondaveeti Simham =

- Theatrical release poster
- Directed by: K. Raghavendra Rao
- Written by: Satyanand(dialogues)
- Screenplay by: K. Raghavendra Rao
- Story by: Mahendran
- Based on: Thanga Pathakkam (Tamil)
- Produced by: M. Arjuna Raju; K. Sivaramaraju
- Starring: N. T. Rama Rao; Sridevi; Jayanthi; Mohan Babu
- Cinematography: K. S. Prakash
- Edited by: Kotagiri Venkateswara Rao
- Music by: Chakravarthy
- Production company: Roja Movies
- Release date: 7 October 1981
- Country: India
- Language: Telugu

Kondaveeti Simham (transl. The lion of Kondaveedu) is a 1981 Indian Telugu-language action film directed by K. Raghavendra Rao. The film stars N. T. Rama Rao, Sridevi, Jayanthi, and Mohan Babu with music by Chakravarthy. It was produced by M. Arjuna Raju and K. Sivarama Raju under the Roja Movies banner.

The core story of the film was based on the 1974 Tamil film Thanga Pathakkam and was remade by same producer-director duo in Hindi as Farz Aur Kanoon (1982). The film was a blockbuster at box office.

== Cast ==
- N. T. Rama Rao as S. P. Ranjith Kumar & Ramu (Dual Role)
- Sridevi as Devi
- Jayanthi as Annapurna
- Mohan Babu as Ravi
  - Master Harish as young Ravi
- Rao Gopal Rao as Major Gopalam
- Satyanarayana as Nagaraju
- Kanta Rao as I. G.
- Allu Rama Lingaiah as China Yuddham
- Nagesh as Sitapati
- Mukkamala as Ranjith's father-in-law
- Chalapathi Rao as Veerabhadraiah
- Suthi Veerabhadra Rao as à dacoit
- Thyagaraju as a dacoit
- Jagga Rao as a dacoit
- P. J. Sarma as Police Inspector
- Chidatala Appa Rao as Gopalam's servant
- Telephone Satyanarayana as Army Chief
- Geetha as Padma
- Subhashini as Pushpa
- Pushpalatha as Tulasamma
- Jhansi
- Sri Lakshmi
- Girija
- Neelaveni

== Soundtrack ==
Kondaveeti Simham

Film score by Chakravarthy
- Released: 1981
- Genre: Soundtrack
- Length: 26:24
- Label: SAREGAMA Audio
- Producer: Chakravarthy

Chakravarthy chronology
Viswaroopam (1981)	Kondaveeti Simham (1981)	Maha Purushudu (1981)

Music was composed by Chakravarthy. Lyrics were written by Veturi. Music released by SAREGAMA Audio Company.

S.No	Song title	Singers	Length
1	"Attamadugu Vagulona"	S. P. Balasubrahmanyam, P. Susheela	4:19
2	"Pilla Undi"	S. P. Balasubrahmanyam, P. Susheela	4:01
3	"Banginapalli"	S. P. Balasubrahmanyam, P. Susheela	4:10
4	"Vaanochche Varadochche"	S. P. Balasubrahmanyam, P. Susheela	3:22
5	"Goothikada Guntanakka"	S. P. Balasubrahmanyam, P. Susheela	2:32
6	"Ee Madhumasam Lo"	S. P. Balasubrahmanyam, P. Susheela	3:56
7	"Maa Intilona"	S. P. Balasubrahmanyam, P. Susheela	4:21
