= Shrirasthu Shubhamasthu =

- DVD cover
- Directed by: Seetharam Karanth
- Written by: Shashidhar Bhat
- Produced by: N. K. Prakash Babu
- Starring: Ramesh Aravind; Anu Prabhakar; Naveen Krishna
- Cinematography: A. V. Krishna Kumar
- Edited by: P. R. Soundar Raj
- Music by: K. Kalyan
- Production company: Shreematha Pictures
- Release date: 2000
- Running time: 134 minutes
- Country: India
- Language: Kannada

Shrirasthu Shubhamasthu is a 2000 Indian Kannada-language romantic drama film directed by Seetharam Karanth and produced by N. K. Prakash Babu. The film stars Ramesh Aravind, Anu Prabhakar along with Naveen Krishna and Srinivasa Murthy in other prominent roles. The film had a musical score and soundtrack composed and written by K. Kalyan.

The film received mixed response upon release. Actor Srinivasa Murthy won the Karnataka State Film Award for Best Supporting Actor for his performance.

== Cast ==
- Ramesh Aravind as Karthik
- Anu Prabhakar as Sapna
- Srinivasa Murthy as Ramchandra
- Naveen Krishna as Harichandra
- Chitra Shenoy
- Vaishali Kasaravalli as Karthik's Mother
- Nagesh Mayya
- M. N. Suresh
- Mandeep Roy as Ram bhatta
- Krishne Gowda
- Vanishree as Karthik's Sister
- Deepa Bhaskar (Child Artist)
- Bindhushree (Child Artist)

== Soundtrack ==
The music of the film was composed and written by K. Kalyan.

Shrirasthu Shubhamasthu

Soundtrack album by K. Kalyan
- Released: 2000
- Genre: Feature film soundtrack
- Label: Akash Audio

No.	Title	Lyrics	Singer(s)	Length
1.	"Punaha Punaha Kelidaru"	K. Kalyan	S. P. Balasubrahmanyam, K. S. Chithra
2.	"Belli Bettada Mele"	K. Kalyan	S. P. Balasubrahmanyam, K. S. Chithra
3.	"Bhoodevi Netthi Mele"	K. Kalyan	S. P. Balasubrahmanyam, K. S. Chithra
4.	"Sagaradalli"	K. Kalyan	S. P. Balasubrahmanyam, K. S. Chithra
5.	"Dheem Dheem Dhinaka"	K. Kalyan	Badri Prasad
6.	"Doora Doora Nodidashtu"	K. Kalyan	K. S. Chithra
7.	"Ella Manasina Sanchara"	K. Kalyan	Badri Prasad, L. N. Shastry, M. D. Pallavi Arun, Nagachandrika, Mysore Ramesh

== Reception ==
India Info wrote "The director seems to have included some fight scenes as well as songs keeping in mind the marketability of the film and can be lauded only for the narration techniques used in the second half. He succeeds in making only a mediocre film".
