= Tharun Sudhir =

Kannada film actor, director

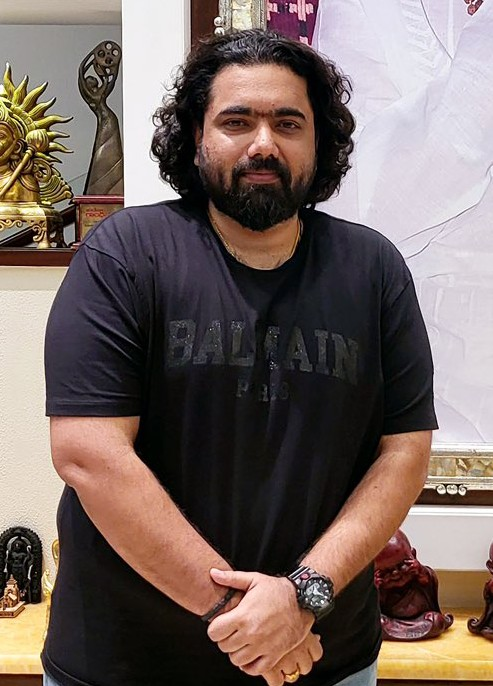
- Born: 9 October 1985 (age 40); Hospete, Karnataka, India
- Citizenship: Indian
- Occupations: Actor, Director, Screenwriter, Producer
- Years active: 1990–present
- Spouse: Sonal Monteiro (m. 2024)
- Parent(s): Sudhir (father); Malathi Sudhir (mother)
- Relatives: Nanda Kishore (Brother)

Tharun Kishore Sudhir is an Indian actor, screenwriter and filmmaker who predominantly works in the Kannada Cinema. He made his directorial debut with the multistarer Chowka which was a commercially successful movie. He is a recipient of one Filmfare and two SIIMA Awards for best director.

== Early life ==
Tharun Sudhir is the son of yesteryear Kannada film actor Sudhir and Malathi Sudhir. Tharun's brother Nanda Kishore is also a Kannada movie director. Tharun completed his studies from the KLE College. He finished his hotel management course and worked at the Ashoka Hotel for 1 year. Apart from his interest in movies, Tharun also desired to pursue a career in Cricket.

== Career ==
=== Acting ===
Tharun has also acted in a few movies. While he made his debut as a child artist in Ganeshana Maduve, Tharun made his senior debut with the movie Excuse Me. He was also seen in movies such as Chappale, Jothe Jotheyali, Vidhyarthi, Navagraha, and Vishnu Sena.

=== Direction ===
After working as a co-director for the 2012 movie Rambo, Tharun made his directorial debut with the movie Chowka in 2017. The movie starred prominent Sandalwood actors such as Prajwal Devraj, Diganth, Prem Kumar and Vijay Raghavendra and received critical acclaim. The movie ran for over 100 days in few centers across Karnataka. Tharun Kishore's next project Roberrt had Darshan in the lead, the movie was released on 11 March 2021. The movie was widely appreciated and was commercially successful at the box office. He once again collaborated with Darshan for Kaatera which was co-written by Jadesh Kumar Hampi and released on 29 December 2023 to positive reports from audience and critics.

He is also acting as creative director for Arvind Kuplikar's directorial starring Sharan and Amrutha Iyengar.

He teamed up again with Darshan for an untitled film based on freedom fighter Sindhoora Lakshmana.

=== Production ===
He also ventured into movie production under his studio Kreatiivez Banner in collaboration with Sharan's Laddu Cinemas for Guru Shishyaru, which he co-produced and acted as creative producer. The movie opened to positive reviews and was commercially successful. He is once again collaborating with Sharan.

== Personal life ==
In 2024 it was revealed that Sudhir was in a relationship with Sonal Monteiro whom he had met on set of Roberrt. The couple married 11 August 2024 according to Hindu customs. They celebrated a Catholic Christian wedding in Mangalore on 1 September 2024.

== Filmography ==
=== As writer and director ===
Key
†	Denotes films that have not yet been released

Year	Film	Director	Writer	Notes
2014	Gajakesari	No	Yes	
2017	Tiger	No	Screenplay	Also creative head
2017	Chowka	Yes	Yes	Filmfare Award for Best Director – Kannada
2018	Raambo 2	No	Yes	
2018	Victory 2	No	Yes	
2021	Roberrt	Yes	Yes	SIIMA Awards 2022 - Best Director
2023	Kaatera	Yes	Story, screenplay	Co-written by Jadesh Hampi

=== As actor ===
Year	Title	Role	Notes
1990	Ganeshana Maduve		Child actor
2003	Excuse Me		
2004	Chappale		
2004	Crime Story		
2005	Vishnu Sena		
2006	Jothe Jotheyali	Prem's friend	
2007	Vidyarthi		
2008	Navagraha	Kumbi	
2008	Honganasu		
2010	Cheluveye Ninne Nodalu	Manoj	
2011	Yogaraj But	Yamadharma	
2014	Haggada Kone		
2014	Gajakesari		
2019	Vrithra		

=== As producer ===
Key
†	Denotes films that have not yet been released

Year	Film	Notes
2022	Guru Shishyaru	Also creative producer
TBA	Untitled film starring Sharan †	

== Awards and nominations ==
Year	Award	Nominated work	Category	Result	Ref.
2018	SIIMA Awards	Chowka	Best Debut Director	Won	
2018	Filmfare Awards South	Chowka	Best Director	Won	
2022	SIIMA Awards	Roberrt	Best Director	Won	
2024	69th Filmfare Awards South	Kaatera	Best Director	Nominated	
