= Thangappathakkam =

1974 film by P. Madhavan

- Theatrical release poster
- Directed by: P. Madhavan
- Written by: Mahendran
- Based on: Thangappathakkam by Mahendran
- Produced by: Shanthi Narayanaswamy; T. Manohar
- Starring: Sivaji Ganesan; K. R. Vijaya; Srikanth; Prameela
- Cinematography: P. N. Sundaram
- Edited by: R. Devarajan
- Music by: M. S. Viswanathan
- Production company: Sivaji Productions
- Release date: 1 June 1974
- Running time: 164 minutes
- Country: India
- Language: Tamil

Thangappathakkam (transl. Gold medal) is a 1974 Indian Tamil-language crime drama film, directed by P. Madhavan and written by Mahendran. Based on Mahendran's play of the same name, the film stars Sivaji Ganesan, K. R. Vijaya, Srikanth and Prameela. It focuses on a disciplined police officer who is dedicated to his job, while his rebellious son, on the contrary, is a criminal and resents his father. Ganesan reprises his role from the play.

Thangappathakkam was released on 1 June 1974. The film was a commercial success, running for over 175 days in theatres, and thereby becoming a silver jubilee film. It served as an inspiration for the Telugu film Kondaveeti Simham (1981), the Hindi film Shakti (1982) and the Kannada film Kadamba (2004).

== Plot ==
Choudhry is a strict and committed police officer. Though a loving husband and father, his top priority is his duty. While he upholds the principles of justice and honesty, his son Jagan proves contrary to this even at a young age. After his father berates him for skipping school and indulging in gambling, Jagan runs away from home. He lands in Bombay, where he is caught by the police for a petty theft and sent to juvenile prison. Though Choudhry's wife Lakshmi longs to meet their son, Choudhry prevents her as he feels it would hamper Jagan's reformation process.

Years later, Choudhry is promoted to Superintendent of Police. Jagan, after his release, returns home. While affectionate towards his mother, he still dislikes his father. This hatred has been ingrained over the years since his father had ignored him for the sake of duty. Jagan falls in love with a woman named Vimala, marries and brings her home. Choudhry and Lakshmi accept her, hoping that all differences have been sorted out and they would now be able to enjoy domestic happiness. However, father and son are still at loggerheads.

Jagan, who befriended other criminals in prison, indulges in several illegal activities like theft, kidnapping and smuggling, and is wanted by the police. Choudhry tries his best to reform Jagan, but fails. His repeated attempts to reform him are misunderstood by Jagan, who decides to take revenge on his father for blocking his path to easy riches. In their fight, the family splits, and a depressed Lakshmi dies. Jagan does not come even for her cremation.

Jagan decides to sell sensitive military documents to a foreign country for a large sum. Choudhry learns of this, confronts him and persuades him to stop, but Jagan refuses and shoots Choudhry, who is forced to shoot back. Jagan dies in the arms of Choudhry, who survives, and is later rewarded with a gold medal for his valour.

== Cast ==
- Sivaji Ganesan as S. P. Choudhry
- K. R. Vijaya as Lakshmi
- Srikanth as Jagan
- Prameela as Vimala
- Major Sundarrajan as Mayandi
- V. K. Ramasamy as Gopalsamy
- R. S. Manohar as Manimangalam Minor
- Cho as Constable Sundaram and Vaiyapuri
- Manorama as Muthammal
- Suruli Rajan as Soodamani
- Pushpamala as Karuppaiee
- V. R. Thilakam as Savithiri
- K. Vijayan as D. I. G. Palanivel
- Poornam Viswanathan as Guest Appearance
- Veeraragavan as Inspector Nithyanandhan / Rajasekaran Chettiyar

== Production ==
Irandil Ondru (transl. One in two) was a play written by Mahendran for actor Senthamarai. While naming the male lead character, a Superintendent of Police, Mahendran could not find any convincing name in Tamil; he found the Bengali name "Choudhry" convincing, and finalised that name. After seeing the play, Sivaji Ganesan bought the rights and staged the play again with some changes under the title Thangappathakkam, starring as Choudhry. This play, which was inaugurated in 1972, was directed by S. A. Kannan. It became a huge success, being staged more than 100 times. Ganesan's company Sivaji Productions decided to adapt it into a film with the same title, with P. Madhavan directing.

Ganesan's daughter Shanthi Narayanaswamy produced the film along with T. Manohar. Mahendran wrote the film's dialogues and was also credited for the original story. Ganesan reprised his role from the play as Choudhry, K. R. Vijaya was cast as his wife Lakshmi, reprising the role originally played by Sivakami while Srikanth was cast as Choudhry's son Jagan, reprising the role originally played by Rajapandian. Cho was cast in two roles: a politician named Vaiyapuri and his older brother Sundaram, a constable. The politician character was not present in the play. Mahendran did not write any dialogue for the scene where Lakshmi dies, instead he "visually depict[ed] the sorrow of a widower, which was very challenging", although Ganesan managed it successfully in a single take. Cinematography was handled by P. N. Sundaram, and editing by R. Devarajan. Choudhry's home was built as set in Vijaya Studios.

== Themes ==
According to Ganesan, Thangappathakkam is not about a man killing his son to receive a gold medal, but a police officer's commitment to his post. In his view, the story elucidates the code of conduct for police officers and how they should perform their duties; the character upholds justice, so the title "Thangappathakkam" (meaning gold medal) actually personifies this dutiful police officer. Within the film, Vaiyapuri calls the policy Annaism (introduced in 1973 by politician M. G. Ramachandran, described by him as "a blend of the fine aspects of Gandhism, communism and capitalism") as "Appaism" (Anna meaning elder brother and Appa meaning father), as a means of ridiculing the policy which was known for being very radical.

== Soundtrack ==
The music was composed by M. S. Viswanathan, with lyrics by Kannadasan. The song "Thatti Sellum" is set in the Carnatic raga known as Valaji, and "Sumaithangi Saaithal" is set in Harikambhoji.

Track listing
No.	Title	Singer(s)	Length
1.	"Sothanai Mel Sothanai"	T. M. Soundararajan, Prameela	3:54
2.	"Thatti Sellum"	Vani Jairam, Saibaba	4:49
3.	"Nallathoru Kudumbam"	T. M. Soundararajan, P. Susheela	4:04
4.	"Sumaithangi Saaithal"	T. M. Soundararajan	3:37
Total length:			16:24

== Release and reception ==
Thangappathakkam was released on 1 June 1974. F. C. Arul, the then Inspector General of Tamil Nadu, made all possible arrangements to exhibit the film in 16 mm in all police stations throughout Tamil Nadu. On 30 June 1974, the Tamil magazine Ananda Vikatan appreciated the film and mentioned that Ganesan showed how a police officer should behave and live through his fantastic acting, and added that the film was a gold medal for Ganesan. Kanthan of Kalki lauded the performances of the lead cast, particularly Srikanth for portraying a new kind of villain not usually seen in Tamil films, in addition to Madhavan's direction and Mahendran's writing. Thangappathakkam was a commercial success, running for over 175 days in theatres, thereby becoming a silver jubilee film. It won the Chennai Film Fans' Association Awards for Best Film, Best Actor (Ganesan), Best Story (Mahendran) and Best Actress (Vijaya).

== Impact ==
Thangappathakkam was dubbed in Telugu as Bangaru Pathakkam in 1976. It served as an inspiration for the Telugu film Kondaveeti Simham (1981), the Hindi film Shakti (1982), and the Kannada film Kadamba (2004). According to Rediff's N. Sathiya Moorthy, Ganesan's characterisation of Choudhry "became a role model for aspiring young police officers". The characterisation of the role became a benchmark in such a way that many later Tamil films would often refer to Choudhry when mentioning an "honest and upright officer". According to film historian G. Dhananjayan, the scene where Choudhry does not utter even a word after his wife's demise "is the way [Mahendran] started his brand of cinema". In Kalakalappu (2012), Pachchai Perumal (George Maryan)'s aspiration is to become a police commissioner and he admires several police officers in films such as S. P. Choudhry.

== Bibliography ==
- Dhananjayan, G. (2011). The Best of Tamil Cinema, 1931 to 2010: 1931–1976. Galatta Media. OCLC 733724281.
- Ganesan, Sivaji; Narayana Swamy, T.S. (2007) [2002]. Autobiography of an Actor: Sivaji Ganesan, October 1928 – July 2001. Chennai: Sivaji Prabhu Charities Trust. OCLC 297212002.
- Mahendran (2013) [2004]. சினிமாவும் நானும் [Cinema and I] (in Tamil). Karpagam Publications. OCLC 54777094.
- Sundararaman (2007) [2005]. Raga Chintamani: A Guide to Carnatic Ragas Through Tamil Film Music (2nd ed.). Pichhamal Chintamani. OCLC 295034757.
