= Isha Sharvani =

Indian actress (born 1991)

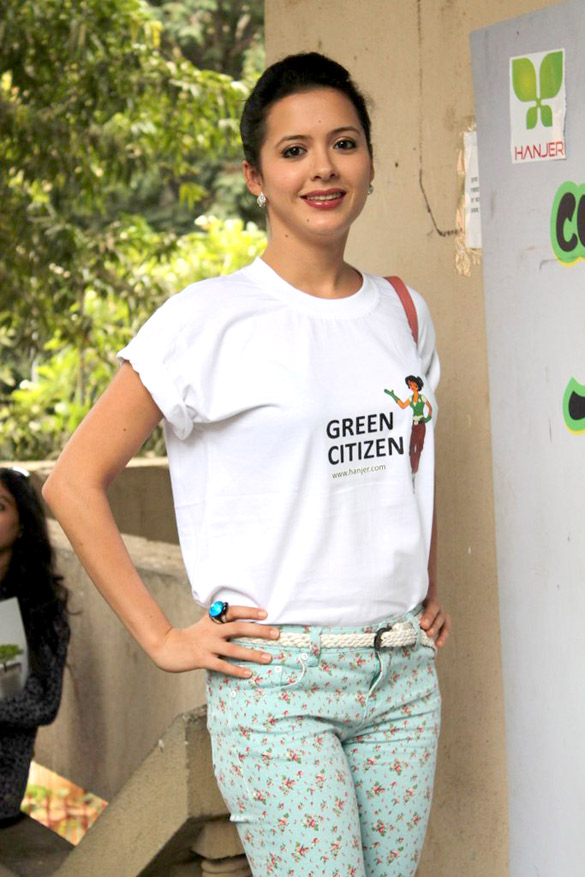
- Sharwani promoting go green initiative, 2012
- Born: 29 September 1984 (age 41); Gujarat, India
- Occupations: Dancer; actress
- Years active: 2005–2020
- Children: 1

Isha Sharvani (born 29 September 1984) is an Indian contemporary dancer and actress. She is known for her stylistic Indian contemporary and aerial dance performances. She has also starred in a few Hindi, Malayalam and Tamil movies.

== Early life ==
Isha was born in Gujarat, India as the eldest daughter of danseuse Daksha Sheth and Australian musician father Dev Issaro from Perth. She lived in Ahmedabad, from where she moved to Delhi, Vrindavan and Bangalore, before settling down in Thiruvananthapuram. She has a younger brother named Tao Issaro, who is a noted percussionist.

Isha's parents founded an arts school called Academy for Art Research, Training and Innovation (AARTI) in Thiruvananthapuram, Kerala, where she lived for 13 or 14 years. At the age of thirteen, she began formal learning in dance from her mother Daksha Sheth at her dance school and learned Kalaripayattu, Kathak and Chhau dance as well as giving performances in 22 countries over last seven years.

According to an interview with India Daily, Isha stated she "lived a different life poles apart from the film industry. For 11 years I have been training eight to 10 hours a day in a very disciplined atmosphere where there is no distinction between boys and girls. I was not supposed to cry over a clipped nail. Beyond stage even my wardrobe has mostly unisexual dresses, jeans and T-shirts". She is a trained Malkam dancer, a type of folk dance.

She has a son named Luca Bassett.

== Career ==
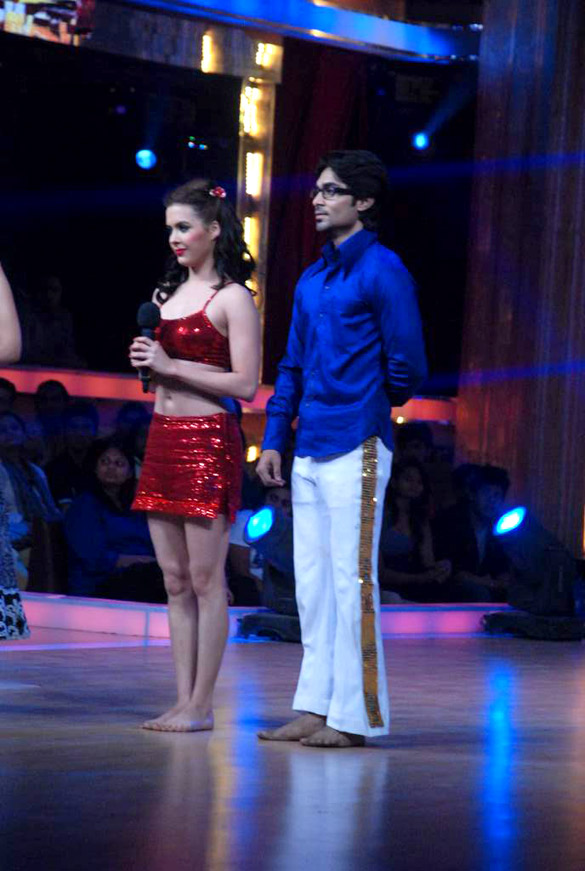
Sharwani on the sets of Jhalak Dikhhla Jaa 5

Isha never gave acting in films much priority, until she was spotted by filmmaker Subhash Ghai, who required someone with dancing skills to perform in his movie Kisna (2005). He offered her the female lead in the film opposite Vivek Oberoi. The film did not do well. She was also the dancer opposite Hritik Roshan in the Parle Hide & Seek commercial, performing a much appreciated dance duet with Hrithik Roshan. Since then she has continued her dance performances on stage, as well as signing for several movies which were released in 2006 and 2007. She appeared as the female lead in the Hindi comedy Darwaza Bandh Rakho in 2006.

She is currently the lead dancer in the Daksha Sheth Dance Company, and has performed in front of live audiences throughout the world, including Mumbai, London, Perth and Muscat. In 2012, Isha was a participant in the dance reality show, Jhalak Dikhhla Jaa Season 5, which was aired on Colors TV and earned acclaim for her dance performances in the show.

In 2013, she played the title role as a housebreaker in the Malayalam short film Esha, a part of the anthology 5 Sundarikal. In 2014, Sharvani played the lead role in the Malayalam film Iyobinte Pustakam, as an Anglo-Indian illegitimate child of a British landlord and an ethnic tribal Indian mother. In 2015, Sharvani played the title role in the Malayalam movie Double Barrel.

== Performances ==
Year	Title	Company	Notes
2021	Whistleblower	The Last Great Hunt	Perth Festival 2021 Commission
2018	Kwongkan (Sand)	Ochre Contemporary Dance	
2016	Kaya (Hello)	Daksha Sheth Dance Company	

== Filmography ==
Year	Film	Role	Language	Notes
2005	Kisna: The Warrior Poet	Lakshmi	Hindi	
2006	Darwaza Bandh Rakho	Isha Taneja	Hindi	
2006	Rocky: The Rebel	Neha Mathur	Hindi	
2007	Good Boy, Bad Boy	Rashmi Awasthi	Hindi	
2008	U Me Aur Hum	Natasha 'Nutty'	Hindi	
2009	Luck by Chance	Nikki Walia	Hindi	
2012	Maattrraan	Herself	Tamil	Special appearance in song "Theeyae Theeyae"
2013	David	Roma	Hindi	Partially reshot in Tamil with same title
2013	5 Sundarikal	Isha	Malayalam	Segment: Esha
2014	Iyobinte Pustakam	Martha	Malayalam	
2015	Double Barrel	Sweety	Malayalam	
2017	Qarib Qarib Singlle	Gauri	Hindi	
2020	Dil Bechara	Guest	Hindi	

== Reality television ==
As contestant

Year	Show	Standing
2012	Jhalak Dikhhla Jaa 5	In the top 3 Withdrew due to injury on 29 September 2012

== See also ==
- List of Indian film actresses
