= Sihi Kahi Geetha =

Indian actress and voice-over artist

- Born: Geetha; Karnataka, India
- Occupations: Actress; voice-over artist
- Spouse: Sihi Kahi Chandru (m. 1990)
- Children: Hitha Chandrashekar

Sihi Kahi Geetha is an Indian actress and voice-over artist known for her work in Kannada cinema and television. She is noted for performances in Nishyabda (1998), Surya Vamsha (1999), Maleyali Jotheyali (2009) and Actor.

== Biography ==
Geetha has appeared in more than 50 films in Kannada. She met actor Sihi Kahi Chandru in the sets of the Doordarshan television series Sihi Kahi in 1986 that they appeared together in. In the widely popular series among the Kannada audience, they played the lead protagonists. They married in 1990. Their daughter Hitha Chandrashekar is an actress and dancer.

== Selected filmography ==
=== As actress ===
- Sididedda Gandu (1990)
- Ramarajyadalli Rakshasaru (1990)
- Bhale Chatura (1990)
- Varagala Bete (1991)
- Modada Mareyalli (1991)
- Kitturina Huli (1991)
- Bhagavan Sri Saibaba (1993)...Sabina
- Indrana Gedda Narendra (1994)
- Hetta Karulu (1994)
- Shubha Lagna (1995)
- Aragini (1995)
- Lady Police (1995)
- Kidnap (1995)
- Betegara (1995)
- Prema Raga Haadu Gelathi (1997)
- Maleyali Jotheyali (2009)
- Sri Harikathe (2010)
- Gowri Putra (2012)
- Haggada Kone (2014)
- Actor (2016)

=== As voice-over artist ===
- Gharshane (1992)
- Banni Ondsala Nodi (1992)
- Shivanna (1993)
- Military Mava (1993)
- Thanikhe (1994)
- Sididedda Pandavaru (1994)
- Gandugali (1994)
- Beda Krishna Ranginata (1994)
- Mojugara Sogasugara (1995)
- Vasantha Kavya (1996)
- Suryavamsha (1999)
- Chamundi (2000)
- O Gulaabiye (2005)

== Television ==
- Sihi Kahi (1986–1987)
- Aadarsha Dampathigalu (2016)
- Jodi No 1 (2022)

== See also ==
- List of people from Karnataka
- List of Indian dubbing artists
- Cinema of Karnataka
- List of Indian film actresses
- Cinema of India
