= Sumanth Shailendra =

Indian Actor

- Born: 7 September 1988 (age 38); Bangalore, Karnataka, India
- Occupation: Actor
- Years active: 2011 – present
- Father: Shailendra Babu

Sumanth Shailendra (born 7 September 1988) is an Indian actor working in Kannada and Telugu language films. He made his acting debut in the 2011 film Aata and got a good break through from the film Dilwala (2013) which brought him much appreciation and popularity. He is the son of popular Kannada film producer Shailendra Babu.

== Career ==
Sumanth debuted in films with the 2011 film, Aata which was produced by his father and directed by Vijayakumar. The film featured him as a football player from a middle-class family. His portrayal of Rahul as the male lead opposite Vibha Natarajan, was not received well among the critics who found the film's plot and his performance to be disappointing. Following this negative response, Sumanth underwent a rigorous training in acting at the Kishore Namith School of Acting and signed his second venture titled Dilwala starring opposite Radhika Pandit. The film received positive reviews from critics with his performance being lauded and citing that a new star to be born in Kannada cinema. The film turned out to be a huge commercial hit at the box-office.

Following this, Sumanth starred in a comedy entertainer Tirupathi Express (2014) alongside actress Kriti Kharbanda. This was a remake of Telugu hit film Venkatadri Express (2013). The film met with an average review from the critics.

== Filmography ==
- All films are in Kannada, unless otherwise noted.

Key
†	Denotes films that have not yet been released

Year	Film	Role	Notes
2011	Aata	Rahul	Debut Film
2013	Dilwala	Prem	
2014	Tirupathi Express	Sumanth	
2015	Bettanagere	Shiva	
2016	Bhale Jodi	Gautham	
2017	Lee	Charlee "Lee"	
2018	Brand Babu	Diamond Babu	Telugu film; Nominated–SIIMA Award for Best Male Debut (Telugu)
2020	Miss India	Vikram	Telugu Film
2021	Govinda Govinda	Venkat	
