= Tharle Village =

- Film Poster
- Directed by: K M Raghu
- Written by: K M Raghu (Dialogue)
- Screenplay by: Sidhe Gowda GBS
- Story by: Sidhe Gowda GBS
- Produced by: Shiva SB
- Starring: Singrigowda; Channegowda; Thammegowda; Abhishek H.N.
- Edited by: KM Prakash
- Music by: Veer Samarth
- Production company: Jeevitha Creations
- Release date: 16 December 2016
- Country: India
- Language: Kannada

Tharle Village, also referred to as Tarle Village, is a 2016 Indian Kannada comedy drama film written and directed by KM Raghu. The film uses several actors from the 2015 Raam Reddy film Thithi, Channegowda, Thammegowda, Abhishek H.N., and Singrigowda, but is otherwise unrelated to the film.

== Synopsis ==
The movie follows several villagers through various exploits and troubles, such as a series of mysterious deaths and an affair.

== Cast ==
- Singrigowda as Nanjappa
- Channegowda as Gaddappa
- Thammegowda
- Abhishek H.N.

== Reception ==
Reception for Tharle Village has been mixed, with most critics feeling that the movie did not measure up favorably to Thithi.The Bangalore Mirror rated the movie at three out of five stars, commenting that "Tarle Village (Mischievous Village) lacks the wry humour and realistic portrayal of village life that was Thithi." The New Indian Express also felt that Tharle Village was not Thithi's equivalent, but gave it "a thumbs up for its honesty. The film is offbeat and is for people who miss the rustic past."

The Hindu was highly critical of the movie, writing that "K.M. Raghu’s poorly conceived and executed film Tharle Village makes you wonder about the relationship between the characters of a story and the story itself."

=== Criticism ===
There was concern that Tharle Village, along with other movies that were casting the Thithi actors in similar or nearly identical roles, were exploiting the actors, prompting Thithi screenwriter Eragowda to state that he was "disturbed after seeing how the actors of Thithi have been recently misused and misappropriated in recent Kannada films." Director Raam Reddy commented that he felt that the actors deserve recognition but that "instead of playing characters that are very similar to their fictional roles in Thithi, it would be much more exciting to see them playing original roles in all their new films."
