= Naveen Krishna =

Indian actor, director and writer

- Born: B. S. Naveen Krishna; Bangalore, Karnataka, India
- Other name: Akshay Krishna
- Occupations: Actor, writer, film
- Years active: 1982–present
- Father: Srinivasa Murthy

Naveen Krishna is an Indian actor, director and writer based in Kannada Film Industry. After having starred in many films as a child actor, he made his adult debut in the film Shrirasthu Shubhamasthu (2000) and has since then acted in various films, mostly in supporting roles, in films such as Kadamba (2004), Nenapirali (2005), Dheemaku (2008) and Mathond Madhuvena (2011). His lead roles in the films, Haggada Kone (2014) and Actor (2016) won him several laurels and appreciations.

In 2013, Naveen announced that he would direct and script a film titled Lakshmi Bar which is yet to release. He did the co-direction for the film Bidalare Endu Ninna (2013).

== Personal life ==
Naveen was born in Bangalore, Karnataka to actor Srinivasa Murthy and Pushpa. He has three siblings of whom his brother Nitil Krishna is also a film actor. He has changed his screen name twice before as Akshay Krishna and later S. S. Krishna to try his luck according to the numerology. However he retained his original name after having found no satisfactory results.

== Filmography ==
Year	Film	Role	Notes
1982	Parajitha		As a child artiste
1988	Mathru Devo Bhava		As a child artiste
2000	Shrirasthu Shubhamasthu		
2003	Hudugigagi		
2003	Bala Shiva		
2004	Kadamba	Rajashekar	
2005	Nenapirali	Ekanth	Credited as Akshay Krishna
2006	Good Luck	Ajay	Credited as Akshay Krishna
2006	Autograph Please		
2006	Geeya Geeya		Credited as Akshay Krishna
2007	Amrutha Vaani		Credited as Akshay Krishna
2008	Dheemaku	Balamurali Krishna	Also writer, lyricist and playback singer
2008	Honganasu	Santhosh	
2010	Sri Harikathe	Ram	
2010	Shambo Shankara		
2010	Naariya Seere Kadda	Vijay	
2011	5 Idiots		Also playback singer for "Ringa Ringa" song
2011	Mathond Madhuvena	Sunny	
2011	Dandam Dashagunam		Voice actor for Chiranjeevi Sarja
2011	Vinayaka Geleyara Balaga		
2011	Yogaraj But	Yogaraj	Also co-writer
2011	Neneyuve Ninna		Also playback singer
2012	Paper Doni	Chethan	
2012	Rambo	Himself	Guest appearance
2012	Jeevana Joke-ali		
2013	Bidalare Endu Ninna	Loki	
2014	Gharshane		Voice-over
2014	Crazy Star		
2014	Nenapideya		
2014	Tirupathi Express		
2014	Haggada Kone	Channa	
2014	Chirayu		
2015	Sri Sai		
2015	Lodde		
2015	Ouija		
2015	Vamshodharaka		
2016	Mast Mohabbat		
2016	Actor	Sanjay	
2016	Aham		
2016	Mandya to Mumbai		
2016	Sri Omkara Ayyappane		
2016	1944		
2017	Ee Kalarava		
2018	Aa Karaala Ratri	Mahalinga	Also dialogue writer
2018	Puta 109		Also dialogue writer
2018	Kismath		
2022	Cutting Shop		

== Television ==
=== As an actor ===
Year	Title	Role	Channel	Notes
	Preethi Illada Mele			
	Maneyondu Mooru Baagilu		ETV Kannada	
2019	Shree Vishnu Dashavatara	Hiranya Kashyapu	Zee Kannada	
2019	Shree Vishnu Dashavataram	Hiranya Kashyapu	Zee Tamil	
2023	Bhoomige Bandha Bhagavantha	Shivaprasad (As a lead)	Zee Kannada	

=== As director ===
Year	Title	Channel	Notes
2016	Girija Kalyana	Colors Super	
2017	Pathedari Pratibha	Zee Kannada	
2018	Kamali	Zee Kannada	
2018–2019	Ughe Ughe Madeshwara	Zee Kannada	
2019–2020	Radha Kalyana	Zee Kannada	
2020–present	Yediyur Shree Siddhalingeshwara	Star suvarana	
