= Master Anand =

Indian film actor

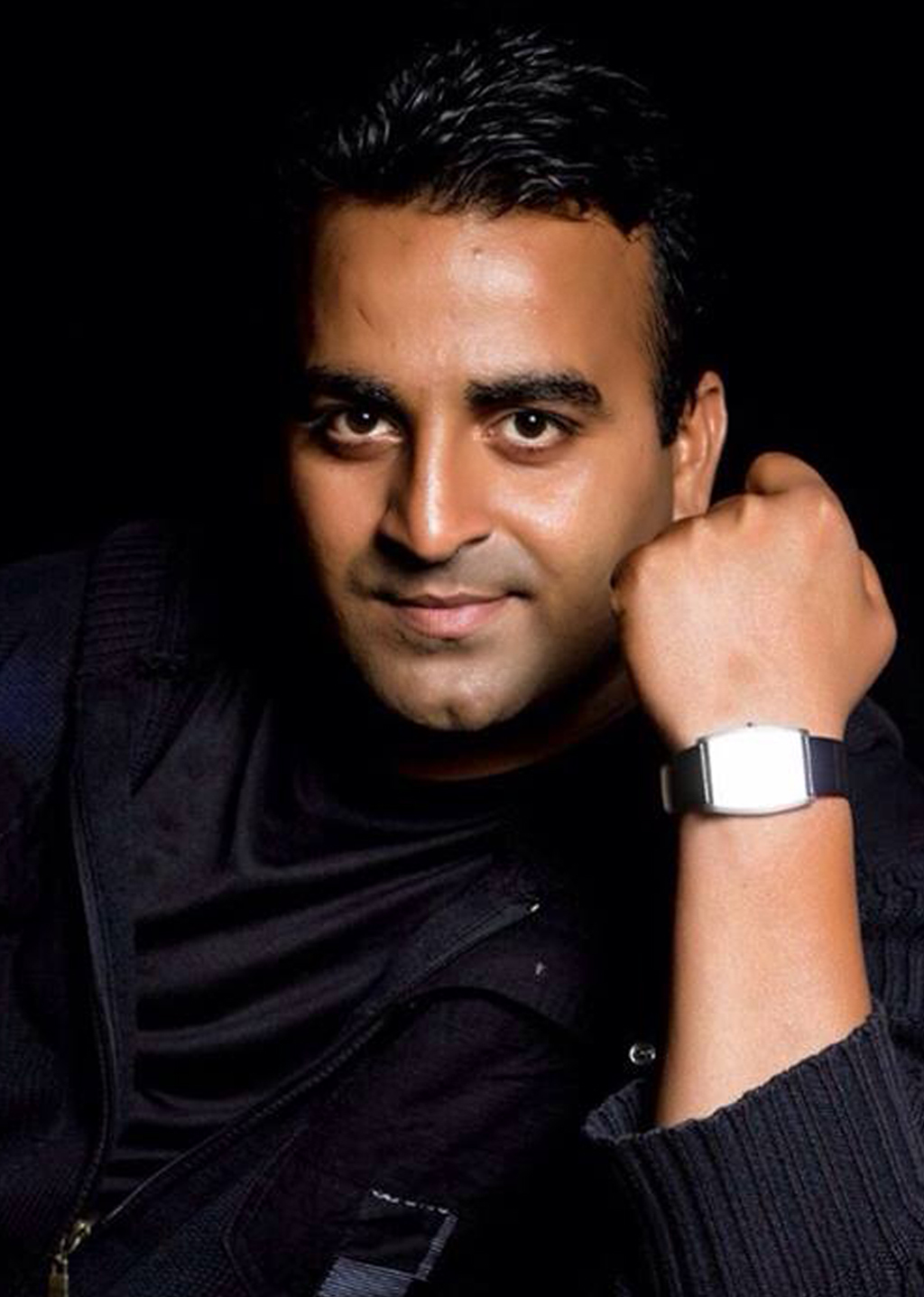
- Born: Hariharan Anand; 4 January 1984 (age 42); Bangalore, Karnataka, India
- Occupations: Actor; director; Television presenter
- Years active: 1988–present
- Spouse: Yashaswini (m. 2010)
- Children: 2
- Website: Official website

Hariharan Anand (born 4 January 1984), popularly known as Master Anand, is an Indian actor, television director and presenter who primarily works in Kannada cinema and television. Regarded as one of the leading child actors of Kannada cinema in the 1990s, he has received several accolades including the Karnataka State Film Awards.

Anand gained recognition for portraying Ganesha in Gauri Ganesha (1990), which earned him his first Karnataka State Film Award for Best Child Actor (Male). He received the award again for his performance in Thayi Illada Thavaru (1995). After transitioning to adult roles, he made his directorial debut with 5 Idiots (2011).

Since the 2010s, Anand has been actively involved in Kannada television as a director, presenter and reality-show personality. He has directed television serials such as SSLC Nan Maklu (2010–2011), Nigoodha Raathri (2019) and Bhoomige Bandha Bhagavantha (2023–2024). He won the second season of the reality show Dancing Stars (2014) and was a finalist on the third season of show Bigg Boss Kannada. Since 2016, he has hosted two popular reality shows Drama Juniors and Comedy Khiladigalu.

== Personal life ==
Anand was born on 4 January 1984 to V. Hariharan and B. S. Latha in Bangalore, Karnataka, India. He has a brother Arun who is also an actor. Anand is married to Yashaswini on 18 March 2010. The couple have a son and a daughter. Their daughter Vanshika Anjani Kashyapa is also a child artist.

== Career ==
Anand began his career as a child artist in Ravichandran's Kindarijogi. As a child actor, he was often credited as Master. He first rose to fame with the 2002 film Friends. He then turned to comedy with the 2010 television series SSLC Nan Maklu, which was telecasted on Asianet Suvarna. In 2011, he debuted as a film director with 5 Idiots. He later directed Paduvaralli Paddegalu, a TV series for Asianet Suvarna and Robo Family, a TV series for Colors Kannada. He was a participant in the second season of Dancing Stars, aired on Colors Kannada; he emerged as the winner in the grand finale. He has acted in over 60 films and has received various awards. He even tasted success as a host through Drama Juniors which was telecasted in Zee Kannada followed by Comedy Khiladigalu which was judged by Jaggesh, Yogaraj Bhat and Rakshita.

== Filmography ==
=== Films ===
Year	Title	Role	Notes
1986	Aparoopada Kathe		
1989	Kindari Jogi		
1990	Shivashankar		
1990	Rani Maharani		
1990	Muthina Haara	Veeraraju	
1990	Hosa Jeevana		
1991	Veerappan		
1991	Sundara Kanda		
1991	Ranachandi		
1991	Keralida Kesari		
1991	Gauri Ganesha	Ganesha	
1992	Belli Kalungura		
1992	Belliyappa Bangarappa		
1992	Goonda Rajya		
1992	Halli Krishna Delhi Radha		
1993	Jwala		
1993	Kollura Sri Mookambika		
1993	Jailer Jagannath	Subhash	
1993	Gundana Maduve		
1994	Chinna		
1994	Gandugali	—N/a	Dubbing artist
1994	Makkala Sakshi		
1994	Kunthi Puthra		
1995	Thayi Illada Thavaru		
1995	Shubha Lagna		
1995	Mojugara Sogasugara		Dubbing artist
1995	Karulina Kudi		
1995	Hosa Baduku		
1995	Hello Sister		
1996	Sowbhagya Devathe		
1996	Shiva Sainya	Ramu	
1996	Pattanakke Banda Putta		
1996	Karpoorada Gombe		
1996	Annavra Makkalu		
1997	Ellaranthalla Nanna Ganda		
1997	Simhada Mari	Young Vishwa's friend	
1997	Mommaga		
1997	Mavana Magalu		
1997	Jenina Hole		
1997	Anna Andre Nammanna		
1997	Nagarika		
1998	Marthanda		
1999	Nannaseya Hoove		
2001	Sri Manjunatha		
2001	Chitte		
2001	Aunty Preethse		
2002	Devaru Varavanu Kotre	Anand	
2002	Friends	Anand	
2003	Hrudayanjali		
2003	Preetisle Beku	Harish's friend	
2003	Panchali		
2003	Mani		
2003	Hudugigagi	Manoj	
2004	Jyeshta	Anand	
2004	Gowdru	—N/a	Dubbing artist
2004	Baithare Baithare		
2005	Hudgeer Saar Hudgeeru		
2007	Sajni		
2007	Preethigaagi	Sanju's friend	
2007	Road Romeo		
2007	Meera Madhava Raghava		
2008	Huttidare Kannada Nadalli Huttabeku		
2008	Chikkamagaloora Chikka Mallige		
2010	Preethi Nee Heegeke		
2010	Preethi Andre Ishtena		
2010	Banni		
2011	5 Idiots	Ganesh	Also director, screenwriter and playback singer
2013	Pyarge Aagbittaite		
2015	Bullet Basya	Painter	
2015	Jathre		
2016	...Re		
2019	Hagalu Kanasu	Vikram	
2021	Premam Poojyam		
2022	Bypass Road		
2023	Na Kolikke Ranga	Ranga	

=== Television ===
Year	Title	Role	Notes	Ref.
2010–2011	SSLC Nan Maklu		Also director	
2011–2012	Paduvaralli Paddegalu	—N/a	As director	
c. 2013–2015	Robo Family	—N/a	As director	
2014	Dancing Stars	Contestant	Season 2; winner	
2015–2016	Bigg Boss Kannada	Contestant	Season 3; finalist	
2016–	Drama Juniors	Host		
2016–	Comedy Khiladigalu	Host		
2019	Nigoodha Raathri	—N/a	As director	
2023–2024	Bhoomige Bandha Bhagavantha	—N/a	As director	

== Awards and honours ==
- Karnataka State Award: Best Child Artist (Gauri Ganesha - 1991–92)
- Karnataka State Award: Best Child Artist (Thayi Illada Thavaru - 1994–95)
- Filmfare Award: Best Child Artist (Makkala Sakshi 1995–96)
