= Actor (2016 film) =

- Film poster
- Directed by: Dayal Padmanabhan
- Written by: Dayal Padmanabhan
- Produced by: K. M. Veeresh; Dayal Padmanabhan; Avinash U. Shetty
- Starring: Naveen Krishna; Sihikahi Geetha
- Cinematography: Suresh Bhairasandra
- Edited by: Raghunath. L
- Music by: Gautham Srivatsa
- Production company: Chitraloka Movies
- Distributed by: Jayanna Films
- Release date: 19 February 2016
- Running time: 100 minutes
- Country: India
- Language: Kannada

Actor is a 2016 Indian Kannada psychological thriller film written, produced by KM Veeresh and co-produced and directed by Dayal Padmanabhan. The film features Naveen Krishna and Sihikahi Geetha as the only two characters appearing on screen. K. M. Veeresh has produced the film for Chitraloka Movies banner. The film re-collaborates director Dayal with actor Naveen after their critically acclaimed previous venture Haggada Kone.

The film's uniqueness is that it is shot at a single location for a stretch of 100minutes involving only two characters. The plot revolves around a successful movie star (Naveen Krishna) whose success rate falls down over a period of time and he gets into a trauma only to be consoled by his home-maid (Geetha) who recites him the stories of her own experience.

== Cast ==
- Naveen Krishna
- Sihikahi Geetha

== Production ==
=== Development & casting ===
The chief editor of the online portal Chitraloka.com, K. M. Veeresh, was in search of a good script to produce a film. After a search of around 3 years, he approached director Dayal Padmanabhan who narrated the story in just few minutes. Veeresh liked the script instantaneously and agreed to produce the film after launching the banner of Chitraloka Movies. Dayal's favorite actor Naveen Krishna was roped in to play the lead protagonist whilst Sihikahi Geetha was signed in to play the role of a maid.

=== Official launch ===
The film was officially launched on 16 November 2015 with a grand opening ceremony held at Bangalore. Naveen's father, actor Srinivasa Murthy clapped for the first shot. Many film personalities including the KFCC Chairman Sa. Ra. Govindu and actor-director V. Ravichandran were among the guests.

=== Marketing ===
The film premiered at the 8th edition of the Bangalore International Film Festival in January 2016. It received huge appreciation from the audience comprising many film industry personalities.

The first promo of the film was launched at the Bigg Boss Kannada 3 by actor-host Sudeep. Later, the trailer was circulated to the online media.

== Soundtrack ==
The soundtrack and original score was composed by Goutham Srivatsa, with lyrics for the former penned by Naveen Krishna. The soundtrack album consists of three tracks. It was released on 6 February 2016 in Bangalore's Chamundeshwari Studios.

=== Track listing ===
| No. | Title | Lyrics | Singer(s) | Length |
|---|---|---|---|---|
| 1. | "Aditya Hrudayam Mantra" | Naveen Krishna | Goutham Srivatsa, Srinivasa | 4:18 |
| 2. | "Bandalu Belakagi" | Naveen Krishna | Goutham Srivatsa | 4:38 |
| 3. | "O Yathrika" | Naveen Krishna | Goutham Srivatsa, Naveen Krishna | 4:16 |
| Total length: | | | | 13:12 |

== Review ==
Deccan Chronicle reviewed the film prior to its theatrical reviews and called the film "A Fine Act!". It rated 3 stars out of 5 lauding the performance of the lead actor Naveen Krishna.
