= Dilwala =

- Film poster
- Directed by: Anil Kumar
- Written by: Anil Kumar
- Produced by: Shailendra Babu
- Starring: Sumanth Shailendra; Radhika Pandit; P. Ravi Shankar
- Cinematography: Sudhakar
- Edited by: K. M. Prakash
- Music by: Arjun Janya
- Production company: Shailendra Productions
- Release date: 4 October 2013
- Country: India
- Language: Kannada

Dilwala is a 2013 Indian Kannada-language romantic drama film directed by Anil Kumar (Dilwala Anil). The film stars Sumanth Shailendra and Radhika Pandit. Shailendra Babu produced the film. The musical score is by Arjun Janya and the cinematographer was Sudhakar's cinematography.

Shot at scenic locales in Bangalore, Mysore, Ooty and Dubai for two songs, the film speaks about a campus romance between a village farmer girl and a rich brat boy. The film received average response from the critics.

== Cast ==
- Sumanth Shailendra as Prem
- Radhika Pandit as Preethi
- Ravishankar
- Jai Jagadish
- Sharath Lohitashwa
- Bullet Prakash

== Production ==
After the debacle of his debut film Aata (2011), actor Sumanth Shailendra with the help of his producer father Shailendra Babu teamed up with director - writer Anil Kumar for a romantic entertainer. The producer signed on the talented actress Radhika Pandit to play the female lead. Arjun Janya was roped in to compose the music while Anil Kumar's previous associate Sudhakar was made to handle the cinematography.

The first schedule of the filming began on 16 December 2012 and continued for a week including a scene at Hyderabad outdoor spot. Rest of the filming took place in Ooty, Mysore, Bangalore and the team left for Dubai to shoot two songs. A huge set was erected on the streets of NICE road near Bangalore spending about ₹30Lakhs.

== Soundtrack ==
The music for the film is composed by Arjun Janya. The lyrics for the songs were written by director Anil Kumar himself along with Yogaraj Bhat and Ananda Priya.

=== Track list ===
No.	Title	Lyrics	Singer(s)	Length
1.	"Ontu Hoda"	Yogaraj Bhat	Arjun Janya	03:58
2.	"Heng Hengo"	Anil Kumar	Kailash Kher, Priya Himesh	03:59
3.	"Heegeke"	Anil Kumar	Harsha Sadananda, Arjun Janya	02:57
4.	"Jaadhoo"	Ananda Priya	Shankar Mahadevan, Shreya Ghoshal	04:51
5.	"Kaigondu"	Anil Kumar	Tippu	05:09
6.	"Arare Arare"	Ananda Priya	Vijay Prakash, Saindhavi	04:47

== Reception ==
A critic from Sify wrote that "Sumanth Shailendra’s 'Dilwala' is definitely better than his previous film ‘Aata’". A critic from Bangalore Mirror wrote that "Dilwala is lavish, colourful and overdone".
