= Bhale Jodi (2016 film) =

- Directed by: Sadhu Kokila
- Screenplay by: Sadhu Kokila
- Based on: Ala Modalaindi (Telugu)
- Produced by: Shailendra Babu
- Starring: Sumanth Shailendra; Shanvi Srivastava; Harshika Poonacha
- Cinematography: Jai Anand
- Edited by: Johny Harsha
- Music by: Sadhu Kokila
- Production company: Sri Shailendra Productions
- Distributed by: M. N. Kumar
- Release date: 19 February 2016
- Country: India
- Language: Kannada

Bhale Jodi is a 2016 Indian Kannada-language romantic comedy film directed by Sadhu Kokila. A remake of Nandini Reddy's Telugu film Ala Modalaindi (2011), the film is produced by Shailendra Babu under his home banner. The film stars Sumanth Shailendra and Shanvi Srivastava in the lead roles along with Harshika Poonacha in the second lead. The music is composed by Sadhu Kokila and cinematography is by Jai Anand.

Filming began in the November month of 2014 and took a single stretch of 32 days to complete. However, the film could not release for a long time. After multiple announcements of the release dates, the film released on 19 February 2016. Even though movie had rich making and was technically sound, it received negative reviews for its lack of depth in story and substandard performances by the lead cast.

== Plot ==
The film begins with an accident. Gautham is abducted by Gejje Kesari. On the way, Gautham is forced to narrate his tale as he talks of stopping a marriage and Kesari too talks of preventing a wedding. Hence, the flashback. Gautham is ready to propose to Ramya with a bunch of roses, but destiny has other plans. Elsewhere, Nithya is playing cricket and hits Gautham with her shot. He is then taken to the hospital in the stretcher. Ramya falls in love with Dr. Anand, who was treating Gautham and they get married eventually. Gautham is invited and leaves for the wedding, but cannot face Ramya. When he walks out, he gets drunk and meets a drunk Nithya who actually was in love with Anand. They go around freaking during the night and part ways the next day.

As destiny has it, they happen to meet in a pub after a few days. Gautham accompanies her everywhere. He realises he's in love with her, but before he could tell her, he finds out that she is already engaged. Gautham steps back and stays secluded. Nithya and her fiancé end their engagement over an argument about Gautham. Unaware of this and having moved on, Gautham starts dating a veterinary doctor Kavya, but they break up after an altercation. Nithya realizes that she loves Gautam and goes to his house after his mother dies, to propose to him, but is shocked to see Kavya in his house. Thinking that they both are married, she leaves to Bangalore and accepts the marriage proposal her parents set for her. After realizing Nithya misunderstood him, Gautham and his friends leave for Bangalore to stop the marriage.

On the way to Bangalore, their car stops and Gautam asks for a lift and they accept and that is where he was kidnapped. After a big fight between Gautam and Kesari, it is revealed that Kesari was looking for the one who gave Gautam a lift, not Gautam. He helps Gautam to reach the wedding. Gautam's friends, who reach the wedding hall, reveal the truth to Nithya. In order to meet Gautham, Nithya escapes from the wedding and ends up asking Kesari for a lift, who accepts looking at the jewellery she is wearing. After listening to her, Kesari realizes that she is Nithya that Gautham came for. He drives back the car to the wedding hall and Nithya take the gun and kidnaps Gautam. Then after a comical scuffle, Nithya reunites with Gautham.

== Cast ==
- Sumanth Shailendra as Gautham
- Shanvi Srivastava as Nithya
- Harshika Poonacha as Ramya
- P. Ravi Shankar as Gejje Kesari
- Sumalatha as Gautham's mother
- Hariprriya as Kavya (special appearance)
- Raj Surya as Soori
- Snigdha as Pinky
- Sadhu Kokila as Gautham

== Soundtrack ==
Bhale Jodi

Soundtrack album by Sadhu Kokila
- Released: November 2015
- Recorded: 2015
- Genre: Feature film soundtrack

Sadhu Kokila has composed the songs and soundtrack for the film.

No.	Title	Performer(s)	Length
1.	"Halavusala"	Harsha, Archana Ravi
2.	"Hello Hello"	Shashank Sheshagiri, Suchitra
3.	"Potco Potco"	Santhosh Venky, Usha
4.	"Vayasige Baro"	Harsha, Lakshmi Vijay
5.	"Yedeya Aala"	Sadhu Kokila
