= Srinivasa Murthy =

Indian actor, director, and producer

- Born: J. K. Srinivasa Murthy; 15 May 1949 (age 77); Jadalathimmanahalli, Kolar, Mysore State (now in Chikkaballapura, Karnataka), India
- Occupations: Actor, television director
- Children: Naveen Krishna

Jadalathimmanahalli Krishnappa Srinivasa Murthy (born 15 May 1949), known popularly as Srinivasa Murthy, is an Indian actor and television director. He is mostly known for his work as a director having made many television series in Kannada, beginning in 2001, based on the lives of various Kannada philosophers and poets, and adaptations of the works of popular Kannada writers. As an actor, he is known for his work in Kannada cinema, appearing often in supporting roles. He began his career as a stage artiste in both professional and amateur theatre, before taking to films in 1977.

== Career ==
=== Films ===
Srinivasa Murthy became a producer of Kannada films quite early. He started off producing films with his friend Jai Jagadish. He made films like Maathru Devo Bhava and a comedy film Thaayigobba Tharlemaga with Kashinath and cast Chandrika (Kannada actress). Followed by Nambidare Nambi Bittare Bidi directed by Umesh which introduced Shruthi and Hosamane Aliya with Anant Nag and Bhavya. He then became a director with the children film Devara Makkalu that won lot of appreciation from critics. It also won an award for Best Children Film from the State government of Karnataka.

=== Television ===
Parallel to his career in films, Murthy directed and starred in many television soaps. He made his debut as a director in 2001, with a Kannada series Anna Basavanna, also starring as the eponymous lead role Basava, a 12th-century philosopher and Kannada poet. The 70-episode series concluded in April 2002, and was aired on ETV Kannada. Following this, in the same year, he directed Pathala Bhairavi, a children fantasy series consisting of 52 episodes, based on the 11th-century Kashmiri poet Kshemendra's work of the same. Murthy appeared in the role of a Mantrik in the series. In 2007, he directed Triveni Sangama, a series based on the works of Anasuya Shankar (pen name, Triveni). He also starred in the series alongside C. R. Simha. In 2014, he made a series based on the life of Kanaka Dasa, a 16th-century philosopher and Kannada poet.

== Personal life ==
Srinivasa Murthy was born on 15 May 1949 to Krishnappa and Nagamma in a village, Jadalathimmanahalli, in the Kolar district of the erstwhile Mysore State (in present-day Chikkaballapura district in Karnataka). Murthy served in the Survey Department under the Government of Karnataka, before entering films in 1977 with Hemavathi.

== Filmography ==
=== As actor ===
- Hemavathi (1977)
- Huliya Haalina Mevu (1979)
- I Love You (1979)
- Guru Shishyaru (1981)
- Keralida Simha (1981)
- Hosa Belaku (1982)
- Joodi Jeeva (1982)
- Parajitha (1982)
- Kaviratna Kalidasa (1983) as Bhoja
- Bhaktha Prahlada (1983)
- Dharani Mandala Madhyadolage (1983)...cameo
- Marali Gudige (1984)
- Kanoonige Saval (1984)...Amara Krishna
- Shapatha (1984)...Sudama
- Avala Antharanga (1986)
- Thayi Karulu (1988)
- Manmatha Raja (1989)...Umapathi
- Shabarimale Swamy Ayyappa (1990)
- Ashoka Chakra (1990)...Dayananda
- Thrinethra (1990)...Police commissioner
- Kaliyuga Seethe (1992)
- Bhagavan Sri Saibaba (1993)...Shyama Pandit
- Dore (1995)
- Mutthinantha Hendathi (1995)
- Ibbara Naduve Muddina Aata (1996)
- Mane Mane Ramayana (1996)
- Mungarina Minchu (1997)
- Chandramukhi Pranasakhi (1999)
- Shrirasthu Shubhamasthu (2000)
- Mahalakshmi (2001)
- Appu (2002)
- Sri Ram (2003)
- Mane Magalu (2003)
- Vijayadashami (2003) as Narasimha
- Saradara (2004)...Gowda
- Udees (2005)
- Valmiki (2005)
- Mr. Bakra (2005)...Bettappa
- Namma Basava (2005)
- My Autograph (2006)
- Ashoka (2006)
- No 73, Shanthi Nivasa (2007)
- Bandhu Balaga (2008)...Anantharamaiah
- Yodha (2009)
- Gilli (2009)
- Mr. Painter (2009)
- Aptharakshaka (2010)
- Prithvi (2010) as Prithvi Kumar's father
- CID Eesha (2013)
- Haggada Kone (2014)
- Shivam (2015)
- Katte (2015)
- Mahakali (2015)
- Mana Mechida Bangaru (2015)
- Thippaji Circle (2015)
- Vamshodharaka (2015)
- Tyson (2016)
- Yuva Samrat (2016)
- Sri Omkara Ayyappane (2016)
- Doddmane Hudga (2016)
- Bangara s/o Bangarada Manushya (2017)
- Raj Vishnu (2017)
- Natasaarvabhowma (2019)
- Rajatantra (2021)
- Talaq Talaq Talaq (2021)
- Krishnam Pranaya Sakhi (2024)

== Television ==
Year	Show	Character	Notes	Channel
2001–2002	Anna Basavanna	Basava	Also director	ETV Kannada
2002	Pathala Bhairavi	A mantrik	Also director	ETV Kannada
2009	Rathasapthami			Udaya TV
2007	Triveni Sangama		Also director	
	Shakthi			
2020–present	Sathya	Ramachandra		Zee Kannada
2021	Kasthuri Nivasa	Brahmachari	Special appearance	Udaya TV

== Awards ==
Karnataka State Film Awards

- 1981–82: Best Supporting Actor—Naari Swargakke Daari
- 1999–2000: Best Supporting Actor—Shrirasthu Shubhamasthu
- Awarded Honorary Dr. Rajkumar Lifetime Achievement Award in Karnataka State Film Awards 2018
