= 14th Cinema Express Awards =

1994 Indian film awards ceremony

- Date: 1994

Highlights
- Best Picture: Kizhakku Cheemayile

The 14th Cinema Express Awards were held on 30 April 1994, and honoured the best of South Indian films released in 1993. The awards were announced on 12 March 1994.

== Tamil ==
Category	Recipient	Film
Best Film	Kalaipuli S. Thanu	Kizhakku Cheemayile
Best Director	Bharathiraja	Kizhakku Cheemayile
Best Actress	Radhika	Kizhakku Cheemayile
Best Villain	Napoleon	Kizhakku Cheemayile
Best Film (Special Award)	K. T. Kunjumon	Gentleman
Best Actor (Special Award)	Arjun	Gentleman
Best Actor	Sathyaraj	Walter Vetrivel
Best Actress (Special Award)	Sukanya	Walter Vetrivel
Best Story Writer	V. Sekhar	Porantha Veeda Puguntha Veeda
Best Dialogue Writer	Crazy Mohan	Chinna Mapillai
Best Lyrics Writer	Vairamuthu	Thiruda Thiruda
Best New Face Actor	Jayaram	Gokulam
Best New Face Actress	Priya Raman	Valli
Best New Face Director	S. Shankar	Gentleman
Best Music Director	A. R. Rahman	Gentleman
Best Cameraman	P. C. Sreeram	Thiruda Thiruda
Best Dance Master	Prabhu Deva	Gentleman
Best Stunt Master	Vikram Dharma	Gentleman
Best Comedy Actor	Vadivelu	Kizhakku Cheemayile
Best Comedy Actress	Manorama	Various
Best Playback Singer	S. P. Balasubrahmanyam	Yajaman and Uzhaippali
Best Playback Singer (Female)	K. S. Chithra	Purusha Lakshanam
Best Child Artist	Baby Shamili	Thanga Pappa

== Telugu ==
Category	Recipient	Film
Best Film	M. S. Raju	Police Lockup
Best Actor	Chiranjeevi	Mutha Mestri
Best Actress	Vijayashanti	Police Lockup
Best Director	Kodi Ramakrishna	Police Lockup

== Kannada ==
Category	Recipient	Film
Best Film	S. A. Govindaraju	Aakasmika
Best Actor	Vishnuvardhan	Rayaru Bandaru Mavana Manege
Best Actress	Malashri	Mangalya Bandhana
Best Director	Dwarakish	Rayaru Bandaru Mavana Manege

== Malayalam ==
Category	Recipient	Film
Best Film	V. B. K. Menon	Devaasuram
Best Actor	Suresh Gopi	Ekalavyan
Best Actress	Madhavi	Akashadoothu
Best Director	Sibi Malayil	Akashadoothu

== NEPC Groups Awards ==
Recipient	Contribution
Rajinikanth	"For his outstanding performance in Hindi films and his efforts in bringing out the talents in technicians in Valli produced by him"
B. R. Vijayalakshmi	"For cinematography in Ravanan and Yen Purushanthan Yenakku Mattumthan"
Vairamuthu	"For the lyrics in Roja emphasising national integration"
Khushbu	"For her contribution to Tamil, Malayalam, Kannada and Telugu films besides Hindi pictures"
