= Ramu (producer) =

Indian film producer in Kannada films (1964–2021)

- Ramu in 2010s
- Born: 20 June 1964; Karnataka, India
- Died: 26 April 2021 (aged 56); Bangalore, Karnataka, India
- Other name: Koti Ramu
- Occupations: Film producer; distributor
- Spouse: Malashri (m. 1997)
- Children: 2
- Website: ramufilms.com

Ramu (20 June 1964 – 26 April 2021) was an Indian film producer and distributor predominantly known for his work in Kannada cinema. He also worked as director and screenwriter. & producer by Ramu are AK 47 (1999), Lockup Death (1994), Kalasipalya (2004), Ganga (2015), Gooli (2008). He died from COVID-19 related complications.

== Career ==
Ramu produced more than 30 films from his production and distribution company, Ramu Films.

== Filmography ==
Year	Title	Ref
2021	Arjun Gowda	
2019	99	
2017	Mumbai	
2016	Dandu	
2016	Danger Zone	
2015	Ganga	
2014	Shivajinagara	
2013	Veera	
2013	Election	
2012	Sagar	
2011	Kanteerava	
2011	Shakti	
2010	Gandedhe	
2009	Kannadadha Kiran Bedi	
2009	Rajani	
2008	Gooli	
2008	Gulama	
2007	Masti	
2007	Preethigaagi	
2006	Thavarina Siri	
2005	Rakshasa	
2005	Auto Shankar	
2004	Malla	
2004	Durgi	
2004	Kalasipalya	
2003	Kiccha	
2003	Nanjundi	
2002	Hollywood	
2002	Law and Order	
2001	Baava Baamaida	
2000	Chamundi	
1999	AK 47	
1997	CBI Durga	
1997	Lady Commissioner	
1997	Simhada Mari	
1996	Circle Inspector	
1995	Hello Sister	
1995	Mutthinantha Hendathi	
1994	Lockup Death	
1993	Golibar	

== See also ==
- List of people from Karnataka
- Cinema of Karnataka
- List of film producers
- Cinema of India
