= Ganga (2015 film) =

2015 film by Sai Prakash

- Official poster
- Directed by: Sai Prakash
- Screenplay by: Sai Prakash
- Story by: Sai prakash
- Produced by: Ramu
- Starring: Malashri; Srinivasa Murthy; Hema Chaudhary
- Cinematography: Rajesh Katta
- Edited by: M. R.
- Music by: Arjun Janya
- Production company: Ramu Films
- Distributed by: Ramu Enterprises
- Release date: 22 October 2015
- Running time: 158 minutes
- Country: India
- Language: Kannada

Ganga is a 2015 Indian Kannada drama film written and directed by Sai Prakash, and produced by Ramu. The film stars Malashri in the lead role. The supporting cast features Srinivasa Murthy, Hema Chowdhary, Pavithra Lokesh, Rangayana Raghu, Suchendra Prasad, Sharath Lohitashwa. Malashri won her first Karnataka State Film Award for Best Actress for her performance in this movie.

== Cast ==
- Malashri as Ganga
- Srinivasa Murthy
- Hema Choudhary as Ganga's sister-in-law
- Pavitra Lokesh as Ganga's sister
- Ishitha Varsha
- Chethan
- Lakshman Rao
- Gururaj Hosakote
- Muni
- Sathya Prakash
- Stunt Siddu
- Mukhyamantri Chandru
- Ramesh Bhat
- Suchendra Prasad
- Sharath Lohitashwa
- Rangayana Raghu
- Sadhu Kokila
- Bullet Prakash

== Production ==
Having worked together in many successful films, with their last being the 1995 film, Gadibidi Aliya, Malashri and Sai Prakash came together for a film after 19 years with Ganga. For the film, Arjun Janya was roped in to compose the music, Anil Kumar for dialogue writing and Rajesh Katta for cinematography. The filming of Ganga began on 6 June 2014 in Bangalore.

== Soundtrack ==
Ganga

Soundtrack album by Arjun Janya
- Released: 27 March 2015
- Genre: Feature film soundtrack
- Length: 9:48
- Label: Anand Audio

Arjun Janya composed the film's background score and music for its soundtrack, with the lyrics written by K. Kalyan. The soundtrack album consists of two tracks.

Track listing
No.	Title	Lyrics	Singer(s)	Length
1.	"Chukku Chukki"	K. Kalyan	Anuradha Bhat, Chithra	4:59
2.	"Neene Thane Ganga"	K. Kalyan	Madhu Balakrishnan	4:49
Total length:				9:48

== Reception ==
Sunayana Suresh of The Times of India rated the film one-and-a-half out of five stars and wrote that "This film is strictly for Malashree fans and those who like their dose of over-the-top melodramas". Echoing the same, a critic from The New Indian Express wrote, "Ganga is purely for those who want to see Malashree in action". Archana Nathan of The Hindu wrote, "Sai Prakash’s Ganga has nothing else that is different from her other films".
