= Simhada Mari =

- Poster
- Directed by: Om Prakash Rao
- Written by: M. S. Ramesh; Kemparaj Bilidaale; Girish Kumar (Dialogues)
- Screenplay by: Omprakash Rao; S. S. David; Kemparaj Bilidaale
- Story by: Omprakash Rao
- Produced by: Rama
- Starring: Shiva Rajkumar; Simran; Krishnam Raju; Ambika
- Cinematography: T. Janardhan
- Edited by: R. Janardhan
- Music by: Hamsalekha
- Production company: Ramu Enterprises
- Distributed by: Ramu Enterprises
- Release date: 6 June 1997
- Running time: 172 minutes
- Country: India
- Language: Kannada
- Budget: ₹3.5 crores

Simhada Mari (transl. Lionet) is a 1997 Indian Kannada-language action drama film directed by Om Prakash Rao and produced by Ramu. The film stars Shiva Rajkumar, Simran and Krishnam Raju. The film's score and soundtrack was scored by Hamsalekha and the cinematography was by T. Janardhan. The movie released in over 80 theatres.

This was the debut movie of Simran in Kannada - which was before her debut in Tamil and Telugu movies. Critics have observed that the flash back portion which is considered to be the heart of this movie went on to be reused in the 2002 Telugu movie Aadi.

== Plot ==
Vishwas frequently rebels against the injustice suffered by the poor and weak at the hands of rich people. Soon, he finds that his father was murdered and seeks vengeance.

== Cast ==
- Shiva Rajkumar as Vishwa / Vishwanatha Simha
- Simran as Usha
- Krishnam Raju as Dharmadhikari Veerendra Simha
- Ambika as Vishwa's mother
- Dheerendra Gopal as Shiva
- Vajramuni as Bhupathi
- Sudheer as Venkatesha
- Tennis Krishna as Tennis Krishna
- Avinash as Vishwa's Caretaker
- B. V. Radha as Usha's mother
- Honnavalli Krishna as Honnavalli
- Vinayak Joshi as young Peter
- Master Anand as Young Vishwa's friend
- Jyothi Meena - special appearance in item dancer in song "Dhekore Dhekore"

== Production ==
The scene in the film had ten stuntmen jump down from a height of 20 feet in police shoes and all had their legs fractured and also camera operator Viji died on the spot. Simran, then a new actress, was chosen for the female lead role. Popular Telugu actor Krishnam Raju was chosen to play a pivotal role making his debut in Kannada films.

== Soundtrack ==
Simhada Mari

Soundtrack album by Hamsalekha
- Genre: Feature film soundtrack
- Length: 30:19
- Label: Lahari Music

Singles from Simhada Mari
- 1. "Manege Ondu Bagilu"; 2. "Naanendu Nimmavane"; 3. "Kannada Nadina"; 4. "Dekhore Dekhore"

External audio
- Simhada Mari Songs Jukebox on YouTube
- Dekhore Dekhore on YouTube
- Naanendu Nimmavane on YouTube
- Nanna Kannu on YouTube
- Manege Ondu Bagilu on YouTube
- Kannada Nadina on YouTube
- Ushe Bandalamma on YouTube

The soundtrack of the film was composed by Hamsalekha and the audio was bought by Lahari Music.

Track listing
No.	Title	Lyrics	Singer(s)	Length
1.	"Ninna Kannu Nanna Kannu"	Hamsalekha	Mano, K. S. Chithra
2.	"Ushe Bandalamma"	Hamsalekha	Mano, K. S. Chithra
3.	"Manege Ondu Bagilu"	Hamsalekha	Rajkumar
4.	"Naanendu Nimmavanu"	Hamsalekha	S. P. Balasubrahmanyam
5.	"Kannada Nadina"	Hamsalekha	Mano
6.	"Dekhore Dekhore"	Om Prakash Rao	Mano
