= Mutthinantha Hendathi =

Indian Kannada-language, drama film

- VCD cover
- Directed by: Perala
- Written by: Perala
- Produced by: Ramu
- Starring: Saikumar; Malashri; Vinaya Prasad
- Cinematography: Manohar
- Edited by: Janardhan
- Music by: Hamsalekha
- Production company: Ramu Enterprises
- Distributed by: Ramu Enterprises
- Release date: 3 February 1995
- Running time: 137 mins
- Country: India
- Language: Kannada

Mutthinantha Hendathi is a 1995 Kannada-language, drama film written, directed by Perala and produced by Ramu. It stars Saikumar, Malashri in lead roles along with Vinaya Prasad, Divyavani, Ramesh Bhat, Srinivasa Murthy, among others in key supporting roles. The music is composed by Hamsalekha.

== Premises ==
The film revolves around the story of Vinod, who is believed to bring death to the girl who marries him due to a curse. Despite this, Gowri decides to marry him.

== Cast ==
- Saikumar as Vinod
- Malashri as Gowri
- Divyavani
- Vinaya Prasad
- K. R. Vijaya
- Ramesh Bhat
- Gundu Kalyanam
- J. V. Somayajulu
- Srinivasa Murthy
- Ashok
- Sanketh Kashi
- Tennis Krishna
- Doddanna
- Anuja
- Uma Shivakumar
- Lokanath

== Soundtrack ==
Mutthinantha Hendathi

Film score by Hamsalekha
- Released: 1995
- Genre: Soundtrack
- Length: 25:46
- Producer: Hamsalekha

The film's music composed and lyrics written by Hamsalekha.

| S. No. | Song title | Lyrics | Singers | length |
|---|---|---|---|---|
| 1 | "Kaleya Baleyolage" | Hamsalekha | S. P. Balasubrahmanyam, S. Janaki | 4:54 |
| 2 | "Shivashankara Poojaphala" | Hamsalekha | S. P. Balasubrahmanyam | 4:44 |
| 3 | "Mutthinantha Hendathi" | Hamsalekha | Mano | 3:34 |
| 4 | "Nava Maasa Thumbida" | Hamsalekha | S. Janaki | 3:55 |
| 5 | "Teenageinida College" | Hamsalekha | Mano | 4.05 |
| 6 | "Namo Murudesha Lingaya" | Hamsalekha | Kusuma | 4.03 |
| 7 | "Thayiye Daivagala" | Hamsalekha | S. P. Balasubrahmanyam, S. Janaki | 5:02 |
