= Lockup Death =

- Directed by: Om Prakash Rao
- Written by: M. S. Ramesh, Kemparaj Bilidaale (Dialogues)
- Screenplay by: Omprakash Rao
- Story by: Omprakash Rao
- Produced by: Ramu
- Starring: Devaraj; Nirosha; Prakash Raj; Shobaraj
- Cinematography: Sundarnath Suvarna
- Edited by: R. Janardhan
- Music by: Hamsalekha
- Production company: Ramu Enterprises
- Distributed by: Ramu Enterprises
- Release date: 12 August 1994
- Running time: 152 minutes
- Country: India
- Language: Kannada
- Budget: ₹ 1 crore to ₹1.5 crore

Lockup Death is a 1994 Indian Kannada-language action film directed and written by Om Prakash Rao starring Devaraj, Nirosha and Saikumar. The film was produced by Ramu for his Ramu Enterprises production banner.

It was one of the first Kannada films to be made with a budget of ₹1 crore. The film was critically acclaimed upon release and won laurels at the Karnataka State Film Awards. It was also a major commercial success heightening the popularity of Devaraj in action hero roles. Editor R. Janardhan was awarded with Best Editing and Thriller Manju was awarded for his action stunts.

The film was widely famous for its action scenes and became a trendsetter for action films in the Kannada film industry. The film was dubbed in Telugu with the same name.

== Plot ==
When a group of young graduates stand anxiously in a queue for attending an important job interview, a young man elaborates about how money is necessary to get a job and asks them to go away only to be beaten by them.

The story cuts to Kumar who aspires to be a police officer. His mother, Janaki, mortgages her house, the only property they have, so as to bribe Minister Mahadevayya who have offered him a job. Kumar has a circle of friends who are thick as thieves. Of them only Amar is employed as he unwilling to bribe anyone has opened a workshop for vehicles. The other three - TK, Giri and Soori are unemployed graduates who spends time attending interviews and partying in Amar's money. Amar's cousin Aasha has a deep crush on him and supports him at difficult times. One night Kumar travels to the minister's house only for the latter to renege upon his word causing an incensed Kumar to assault him. He is arrested by the minister's close aid Circle Inspector Rajashekhar. Inspector uses third degree torture to make a reluctant Kumar sign some papers leading to his death. With the help of Marimuthu, a local rowdy, they bury his corpse. However, Amar, who has already been into a fight with Marimuthu gets to know about this from the latter and takes him to Superintendent of Police Lakshman. The next day in the court Advocate Kabinipathi who defends the minister and the Inspector accuses Amar of the murder with the fake evidences planted by the corrupt Superintendent supporting the claim. He is given a life imprisonment. It is revealed that Marimuthu was killed so as to hide the truth. Unable to face the humiliation and ostracism, Amar's mother and sister commit suicide. While he is taken to perform their last rites, he kills Lakshman and in return is brutally tortured in the prison by Rajasekhar. The next day when he is taken to the hospital his friends rescue him. However, Giri gets killed in the process.

Amar is taken to a secret hideout where he after initial opposition agrees to make his friends and Asha part of his vengeance crusade. Taking the alias of Janma who has achieved Punarjanma (Reincarnation) he threatens to kill his rivals. He first kills Lawyer Kabinipathi and hangs him before court. The pressure of the case mounts upon Commissioner Venkataramayya who gives an ultimatum for Rajasekhar. An enraged Rajasekhar goes with a battalion to Amar's old housing colony in Shantipura and thrashes the innocent people. Amar's uncle criticises them for not believing in Amar and then leads them in a violent rebellion against the police officers. They barge into the station and beat the officers until stopped by Venkataramayya who after coming to know about what happened in the colony feels humiliated and suspends Rajasekhar. He also understands Amar's innocence and declares how he doubt the involvement of the minister in Kumar's custodial death forcing the latter to resign from his post.

Meanwhile, Rajasekhar along with a few hooligans raid Amar's safe house and captures his friends. Amar after a long fight rescues them and impales Rajasekhar to his death. Venkataramayya beefs up the security outside Mahadevayya's house. However, Soori manages to lure them away by posing as a sniper while Amar defeats the ex-minister's bodyguards. Before he can kill Mahadevayya he is captured by the police.

The story shifts to the Uccha Nyayalaya where the prosecutor advocates for capital punishment to battle criminals like Amar when he bursts out about how he became Janma with the law having equal role in it. He mentions about how the blindfolded justice cannot understand the unseen anecdotes behind crimes. Even Venkataramayya threatens to quit his job if the court doesn't serve Amar justice after placing his gun and belt on the Judge's bench. Just about when the Judge is about to read his verdict (possibly negative as poetic justice is not practical) the young man from the beginning of the film who was also a victim of the minister's deceit takes the gun from Judge's bench and murders the ex-minister with all others standing in incredulity.

== Cast ==
- Devaraj as Amar (Janma)
- Nirosha as Asha
- P. Sai Kumar as Kumar
- Prakash Raj as Giri
- Shobhraj as Soori
- Tennis Krishna as Tennis Krishna (TK)
- Costume Krishna as Minister Mahadevayya
- Pradeep Shakthi as Circle inspector Rajashekhar
- Vajramuni as Police Commissioner Venkataramayya
- Doddanna as Lawyer Kapinipathi
- Lokesh as Amar's uncle
- Jayachitra as Amar's mother
- Dubbing Janaki as Kumar's mother
- Avinash as Inspector
- Honnavalli Krishna as Lady Auto Driver
- Dingri Nagaraj as Jaagate
- Lakshman Rao as Police Superintendent Lakshman
- Lohithaswa as High Court Judge
- Rambo Rocky as Maarimutthu
- Silk Smitha, cameo appearance in song "Current Banthu"
- Raju Sundaram, cameo appearance in song "Current Banthu"

== Production ==
The chase scenes required the stuntmen in the costumes of police chasing the protagonist who is being saved by his friends (Shobharaj driving the ambulance with Nirosha and Tennis Krishna inside the Tempo Traveller van with Devaraj in unconscious state) was shot at MG Road, Bangalore. The stuntmen Shivakumar and Ravi had to jump upon a double decker bus of the Bangalore Metropolitan Transport Corporation (then BTS) but something went wrong which resulted in serious injuries of the crew. The film's budget was around 1.4 crore.

== Soundtrack ==
The music of the film was composed and lyrics written by Hamsalekha.

Lockup Death

Soundtrack album by Hamsalekha
- Released: 1994
- Genre: Feature film soundtrack
- Label: Jhankar Music

No.	Title	Lyrics	Singer(s)	Length
1.	"Kachhikondaadona Baaro"	Hamsalekha	K. S. Chithra
2.	"Banthu Banthu Current Banthu"	Hamsalekha	S. P. Balasubrahmanyam, S. Janaki
3.	"Oh Puttananja"	Hamsalekha	S. P. Balasubrahmanyam, K. S. Chithra
4.	"Januma Namagiruvudu"	Hamsalekha	S. P. Balasubrahmanyam
