= Durgi (film) =

2004 Indian film by P. Ravi Shankar

- DVD Cover
- Directed by: P. Ravi Shankar
- Written by: P. Ravi Shankar
- Produced by: Ramu
- Starring: Malashri
- Cinematography: Raja Rathinam
- Edited by: Jo Ni Harsha
- Music by: Hamsalekha
- Production company: Ramu Enterprises
- Distributed by: Ramu films
- Release date: 28 April 2004
- Running time: 161 minute
- Country: India
- Language: Kannada

Durgi is a 2004 Indian Kannada-language action thriller film directed by P. Ravi Shankar who made his directorial debut. The film stars Malashri in the lead role. The film is about a female rowdy seeking revenge against politicians who raped and killed her sister. The film was remade in 2005 in Telugu as Narasimhudu starring Jr. NTR. In 2008, the film was dubbed in Hindi as Main Hoon Durga and in Malayalam as Bhasmasuran.

== Plot ==
The movie opens with Jayadev aka J.D. (Raghuvaran), a business tycoon, about to get arrested by police with the help of his old friend and business partner, Marigudi (Kalabhavan Mani), a notorious goon who is now his rival. Marigudi bribes MLA Chandrappa to testify against J.D. In response, J.D. and his son Rahul kill Chandrappa. J.D. wants to make Rahul candidate in the elections against Marigudi's brother Naga (G. V. Sudhakar Naidu). To end the duo's rivalry, the government appoints a new police commissioner to Bangalore, Shankar (Ashish Vidyarthi), a tough by-the-book officer who will not spare anyone corrupt from the law.

One day, Shankar arrests a young woman named Durgi (Malashri) for thrashing some goons in the Majestic Bus Station. He is compelled to release her after learning that Durgi had stopped the goons from molesting a girl in the bus, though is shocked by the sheer rage in her eyes. The grateful girl and her parents accompany Durgi, her grandmother, and her village master to their housing colony. Durgi came from Madikeri to seek revenge on J.D. and Marigudi. One day, she tries to leave the colony to face them but is noticed by Shankar, who thinks she has mental problems. Unable to control her anger, Durgi and the master plan to kill Marigudi's brother Naga. Marigudi used forged papers to have Naga run as an independent candidate against Rahul.

On the nomination day, Marigudi's car gets blasted, killing four men. Marigudi himself ruthlessly blasted the car to frame J.D. and acquire both public support and votes for Naga. Naga is falsely admitted to the hospital by Marigudi to make the public believe he is in critical condition. They also plan to fake Naga's death. Durgi and the master fail to get inside the hospital due to the increased security so she cuts her hand to be allowed in for treatment. She enters the ICU while Marigudi is absent and brutally kills Naga. Marigudi brings the media to ICU claiming that Naga is in a com, only to be devastated upon seeing his brother dead. Thinking J.D. is responsible, Marigudi vows to finish off him and his son.

Durgi next targets Rahul, whom Marigudi's henchmen chase into a theatre. Durgi silently enters and kills Rahul. Shankar comes to save Rahul but he is found dead in the toilet. To catch the culprit, Shankar orders everyone inside the theater to exit in single-file lines. Durgi and the master leave separately to prevent the commissioner from getting suspicious about seeing them together. However, the master ends committing suicide by shocking himself to save Durgi. Afterwards, Shankar realizes Durgi killed both Rahul and Naga. He enquires about Durgi in her colony, where she arrives and reveals her story.

Durgi is an illiterate woman who resided in Durgapura near Madikeri. She was loved by all in her village and lived happily with her father Ramappa (Ramesh Bhat), younger sister Ninky, and grandmother. One day, J.D. and Marigudi came to Durgapura to construct a sugarcane factory. Naga and Rahul also came. They were alcoholic spoiled brats who sexually harassed Durgi, but she was stopped from retaliating by the caretaker of the guest house. Ramappa prepared food for them which was to be delivered by Durgi. The duo planned to abuse Durgi when she entered but Ninky unfortunately came there instead. Naga and Rahul were angered so they gang-raped Ninky and threw her into the river. After finding her sister, a devastated and enraged Durgi went to confront them but they had already fled. To protect their son and brother from being charged with rape, Marigudi and J.D. bribed the doctor into letting them inside Ninky's hospital room, where they suffocated her to death with a pillow. They also killed Ramappa, who tried to stop them. Durgi, her grandmother, the master, and the villagers were too late to save them. When they tried to file a case against Rahul and Naga with the MLA's help, they discovered that Ninky's post-mortem report was falsified by the doctor on J.D. and Marigudi's orders. A riot broke out, in which a vengeful Durgi murdered the doctor in front of everyone by tearing out his throat.

A police officer arrests Durgi but doesn't take her to jail. He reveals why J.D and Marigudi murdered Ninky and Ramappa, and seemingly encourages Durgi to go after the remaining men who committed injustice towards her family. Durgi escapes but the police officer shoots her to save J.D. and Marigudi. J.D. kills the policeman and lies that he and Durgi shot each other face to face. After hearing Durgi's story, Shankar wants to help her and promises he will bring both J.D. and Marigudi in the front of the law. However, Durgi doesn't believes there is law and vanishes. Durgi saves J.D. from Marigudi so she can kill him in front of the colony residents. She then confronts Marigudi and after an intense battle, kills him.

Shankar witnesses Marigudi's murder but ultimately decides not to charge Durgi due to her continued pain and sorrow. Durgi and her grandmother return to their village, where they are welcomed by the residents. Durgi imagines seeing her sister one last time.

== Cast ==
- Malashri as Durga Parameswari aka Durgi, Madikeri Rowdy
- Ashish Vidyarthi as Shankar, Deputy Police Commissioner of Bangalore City
- Raghuvaran as JD (Jaydev)
- Kalabhavan Mani as Marigudi
- Avinash as Teacher
- Doddanna as MLA
- Sadhu Kokila as Durgi's friend
- Honnavalli Krishna as Colony member
- Tennis Krishna as Colony member
- B. Jayashree as Durgi's grandmother
- Ramesh Bhat as Durgi's Father
- Biradar as Doctor of colony
- G. V. Sudhakar Naidu as Naga, Marigudi's brother
- Sathyajith as corrupt police officer
- Bullet Prakash as colony member
- Mandeep Roy as doctor
- P D Raju
- Costume Krishna
- B K Shankar
- Dinesh Mangaluru
- Bharath Bhagavathar
- Sarigama Viji
- Michael Madhu
- Ramanand
- Rajagopal
- Sridhar
- Jayaram
- Kempegowda
- Chandra
- Ashalatha
- Pankaja
- Baby Arpitha
- Master Ganesh

== Production ==
This film marks the directional debut of actor cum dubbing artist P. Ravi Shankar who earlier assisted Ram Gopal Varma. Malayalam actor Kalabhavan Mani was chosen as the antagonist which marks his debut in Kannada Cinema. Tamil actor Raghuvaran was chosen to portray the role of second antagonist. This film was the comeback of Malashri after a hiatus of 4 years. The film was launched on 23 June 2003 at The High Lands Hotel at Bangalore. This film was originally planned as Ram with Arjun Sarja which the story was changed into female oriented film.

== Soundtrack ==
The soundtrack was composed by Hamsalekha and lyrics are also written by him. The audio is released by Jhankar music.

Durgi

Soundtrack album by Hamsalekha
- Released: 2004
- Genre: film soundtrack
- Language: Kannada
- Label: Jhankar Music
- Producer: Hamsalekha

Hamsalekha chronology
Nanjundi (2003)	Durgi (2004)	Gowdru (2004)

Track listing
No.	Title	Singer(s)	Length
1.	"Bilthave Nodeega Kavvathagalu"	B. Jayashree
2.	"Cotton Pete Kanakamma"	Mano, S. Janaki
3.	"Idu Hennu Huli"	Manjula Gururaj
4.	"Kaveri Neeru Banti Nalliyalli"	Badri Prasad, Chethan Kumar, J. Anoop Seelin, Manjula Gururaj
5.	"Sri Krishna Sri Krishna"	Madhu Balakrishnan

== Release and reception ==
It was released in 2004 and became an average success. A critic from Viggy wrote "Director succeeded to keep the matter secret till the interval; then goes haywire leaving many situations to your imagination. We strongly advise week hearted and sensitive people to avoid this film. But if you are the kinds who love programs like Crime Diary or Crime Story, yes, Durgi is a feast to watch!". A critic from Chitraloka.com wrote that "This is a pakka (transl. pure) commercial film with nail biting stunts. The narration adopted by the director is superb". Deccan Herald wrote "The director has maintained the suspense in the first part and ‘the story begins’ in the second part which is more of violence and action than acting. There is nothing new in the story. It is full of violence, blood, murders and harsh sounds".
