= Porantha Veeda Puguntha Veeda =

- Poster
- Directed by: V. Sekhar
- Written by: V. Sekhar
- Produced by: C. Kannappan; S. S. Durairaju; S. Tamilselvi; R. Vijay
- Starring: Sivakumar; Bhanupriya
- Cinematography: G. Rajendran
- Edited by: A. P. Manivannan
- Music by: Ilaiyaraaja
- Production company: Thiruvalluvar Kalaikoodam
- Release date: 21 May 1993
- Running time: 150 minutes
- Country: India
- Language: Tamil

Porantha Veeda Puguntha Veeda (transl. Birth home or in-law's home?) is a 1993 Indian Tamil-language comedy drama film directed by V. Sekhar. The film stars Sivakumar and Bhanupriya, with Vadivukkarasi, Goundamani, Kovai Sarala, Senthil, S. S. Chandran and Charle in supporting roles. It was released on 21 May 1993. The film was remade in Telugu as Puttinilla Mettinilla (1994).

== Plot ==
Amudha is a hard-working woman who is from a poor family. She has to support her alcoholic father and three siblings. Ravi is a well-educated man who is from a rich family. His mother Nirmala Devi is arrogant, takes her family's prestige seriously, and spends most of her time with her friends, while his father is an uneducated rustic. He also has a mentally challenged sister Mohana, who is married to a jobless man and has three siblings.

For many years, Ravi was looking for a wife who could take care of him and his family. After seeing the beautiful Amudha, he wants to marry her. His family friend Valluvardasan decides to help him. He then talks to Amudha's father about this matter. Amudha accepts for the marriage but only under one condition: she would continue to work and help her family. Ravi and Amudha finally marry.

After the marriage, Ravi wants her to look after his big family. Amudha resigns her job without fuss and tries to become a good housewife, but Nirmala Devi does not miss an opportunity to ridicule her. Later, Amudha's father passes away and Amudha's siblings come to live with them. Nirmala Devi turns Ravi against Amudha; thus, Amudha's siblings are humiliated by Nirmala Devi and they leave their house without warning. This incident has broken Amudha's heart. Thereafter, she becomes pregnant. A few weeks later, Amudha finds her siblings in another city. The three worked hard to eat. Amudha decides to bring them at home; during the travel, they meet an accident and Amudha loses the baby. When Ravi learns of the miscarriage, Amudha is driven from their home. What transpires next forms the rest of the story.

== Cast ==
- Sivakumar as Ravi
- Bhanupriya as Amudha
- Goundamani as Ravi's father
- Senthil as Mohana's husband
- Vadivukkarasi as Nirmala Devi
- Kovai Sarala as Mohana
- S. S. Chandran as Valluvardasan (guest appearance)
- Charle as Pattinathar
- Master Haja Sheriff as Ravi's brother
- Kumarimuthu as Amudha's father
- Thideer Kannaiah as Veera
- Oru Viral Krishna Rao
- Idichapuli Selvaraj as Doctor
- C. K. Saraswathi as Kumari Baby
- K. S. Jayalakshmi as Lilly
- Mano as himself

== Production ==
Sekhar revealed the film's concept was inspired from his wife who often spoke proudly about her birth home.

== Soundtrack ==
The soundtrack was composed by Ilaiyaraaja, with lyrics written by Vaali.

Song	Singer(s)	Duration
"Thondharavu Pannathinga"	Mano, K. S. Chithra	4:24
"Amma Pathil Solladi"	S. Janaki	4:35
"Veettukku Vilakku"	Mano, K. S. Chithra	4:41
"Chandrigaiyum"	Mano, K. S. Chithra	4:59
"Pongallo Pongallayya"	Malaysia Vasudevan	5:36

== Reception ==
Malini Mannath of The Indian Express stated, "Sekhar has once again chosen relevant theme, woven a fairly neat screenplay around it and told his story with humour, warmth and sensitivity" and praised the performances of its lead pair. At the 14th Cinema Express Awards, Sekhar won the award for Best Story Writer.
