= Preethi Prema =

2017 Indian Kannada-language romantic drama film

- Directed by: Kashi Vishwanath
- Produced by: Virgo Illusions
- Starring: Krishna Chaitanya; Nidhi Kushalappa; Tennis Krishna; Swati Rao
- Music by: B.J. Bharath
- Production company: Virgo Illusions
- Release date: 17 February 2017
- Running time: 125 minutes
- Country: India
- Language: Kannada

Preethi Prema is a 2017 Indian Kannada-language romantic drama film directed by Kashi Vishwanath and produced by Virgo Illusions. The film stars Krishna Chaitanya and Nidhi Kushalappa in the lead roles, with Tennis Krishna and Swati Rao in supporting roles. The story revolves around two individuals dealing with past relationships and their evolving bond. It was released on February 17, 2017.

== Plot ==
The film centers on Prem (Krishna Chaitanya), a software engineer affected by a previous breakup, and Preethi (Nidhi Kushalappa), a woman escaping harassment from an ex-lover. They meet and form a connection, which is later complicated by the return of Prem's former girlfriend.

== Cast ==
- Krishna Chaitanya as Prem
- Nidhi Kushalappa as Preethi
- Girish T S
- Girish Vidyanathan
- Yamuna Srinidhi
- Tennis Krishna
- Swati Rao

== Production ==
The film was directed by Kashi Vishwanath, with music composed by B.J. Bharath. It has a runtime of 125 minutes and was produced by Virgo Illusions.

== Release and reception ==
Preethi Prema was released on February 17, 2017. The film received mixed reactions from critics. GS Kumar from The Times of India gave it 2.5 out of 5, writing that it focuses on relationships but lacks narrative strength. A Sharadhaa from The New Indian Express said it portrays the dynamics of modern relationships. Shyam Prasad S. from Bangalore Mirror wrote that the film feels outdated in its approach. Guruprasad Narayana from Kannada Prabha said the premise is relatable, but the execution remains average.
