= Sharath Lohithaswa =

Indian actor (born 1972)

- Born: Sharatchandra Lohithaswa; 5 May 1972 (age 54); Thondagere, Tumkur, Mysore State (now Karnataka), India
- Occupation: Actor
- Years active: 1995–present
- Father: Lohithaswa

Sharatchandra Lohithaswa (born 5 May 1972), known popularly as Sharath Lohithaswa, is an Indian actor who works predominantly in Kannada cinema alongside some Tamil and Telugu films. He has had a successful career in theatre, where he continues to work, and television. After working as a lecturer for a brief period, Sharath took to acting as a full-time profession and worked on stage following the footsteps of his father Lohithaswa. He began working in films in 1995 and has today established himself as a character actor.

== Early life ==
Sharath had an inclination towards cricket and theatre as a child, and "dramatise[d] Bhagat Singh on stage when in school." He "used to read a lot of plays written by people like Kambar" and rated himself as a "fairly good singer too." He accompanied his father Lohithaswa, to his rehearsals for plays, and also took part in "many stage and radio plays before doing amateur theatre in Bengaluru." This led his father Lohithaswa to suggest that Sharath take English-language as his graduation subject. Sharath also obtained a master's degree in English from Bangalore's National College, where he also went on to work as lecturer.

== Career ==
After a while, "boredom and monotony" led Sharath to quit and taking to acting as a full-time profession starting with stage. He performed in Vasamsi Jirnani, based on a Marathi-language play, and Nanna Thangige Ondu Gandu Kodi among others. His made his film debut playing a bit part in M. S. Sathyu's non-commercial film, and his commercial film debut with Huliya (1996). In an interview to Deccan Herald in 2003, he recalled, "I was offered the role of Huliya for which I was supposed to sport a funny haircut. After that, I could not go into teaching again. The roles that I was offered after Huliya were repetitive. I got fed up. Fortunately or unfortunately, I met with an accident and was forced to off work for at least two to three years. Godhuli came as a major break in my career." He received appreciation for his role as Cheluvanayaka in Chi. Guru Dutt's Godhuli, also fetching him the Aryabhata Award. While he began working in films starting in 1995, it was television that gave him recognition. He appeared in Sathyu's Khayar and Poli Kitty. Work in Kicchu and Chidambara Rahasya led him to become a popular face in Kannada television.

In films, Sharath was cast as Kotwal Ramachandra in Aa Dinagalu (2007), a performance that received praise. R. G. Vijayasarathy of Rediff.com called his performance "wonderful". He received multiple awards for his performance, including the South Filmfare Award for Best Supporting Actor.

Sharath's debut in Tamil films came with Ethir Neechal. He appeared in other Kannada films such as Sanju Weds Geetha (2011) and Bheema Theeradalli (2012). He is known mostly for portrayal of villainous roles in the South Indian films. For his performance in Matthe Satyagraha (2014), he received the Karnataka State Film Award for Best Supporting Actor.

== Filmography ==
=== Kannada films ===
Year	Film	Role	Notes
1996	Huliya	Raama	
1996	Police Story	Dharma	
1999	Durga Shakthi	Shivmuttu	
2003	Paris Pranaya		
2003	Huchana Maduveli Undone Jaana		
2003	Singaaravva		
2003	Khaki	Siddharth Nayak	
2003	Daasa		
2004	Monda		
2004	Sarvabhouma	Wasim Akram	
2004	Jyeshta	Bhadra	
2005	Giri		
2006	Suntaragaali		
2006	Kallarali Hoovagi	Palanayaka	
2007	Aa Dinagalu	Kotwal Ramachandra	
2007	Janapada		
2007	Ondu Preethiya Kathe		
2008	Mandakini		
2008	Bidda		
2008	Arjun	Naga	
2008	Yuga Yugagale Saagali	Narasimha	
2008	Chikkamagaloora Chikka Mallige		
2009	Kencha	Pashupathy	
2009	Nanda		
2009	Ninnalle		
2009	Raam	Chikkamallayya	
2009	Hatrick Hodi Maga	Kapali	
2010	Gandedhe		
2010	Punda	Bhoja	
2010	Porki		
2010	Thamassu	Mastan	
2010	Gundragovi		
2010	Jugari		
2010	Meshtru		
2010	Nanjanagoodu Nanjunda		
2010	Vichithra Premi		
2011	Manasina Maathu		
2011	Suicide		
2011	Sanju Weds Geetha	Prakash	
2011	Rajadhani	Manohar	
2011	Saarathi		
2011	Vishnu		
2012	Bheema Theeradalli	Mallappa	
2012	Cyber Yugadol Nava Yuva Madhura Prema Kavyam		
2012	Edegarike		
2012	Gavipura		
2012	Parie		
2012	Sagar		
2012	Shakti	Betappa	
2012	Shikari		
2013	Varadhanayaka		
2013	Gajendra		
2013	Jinke Mari		
2013	Kumbha Rashi		
2013	Khatarnak		
2013	Parari		
2013	Bangari		
2013	Madarangi		
2013	Ziddi		
2013	Sweety Nanna Jodi		
2013	Sthree Shakthi		
2013	Bulbul		
2013	Kaddipudi	Shankarappa	Nominated, Filmfare Award for Best Supporting Actor – Kannada
2013	Dilwala		
2013	Tony		
2013	Election	Vishwanath	
2014	Ambareesha		
2014	Power	Minister Narasimha	
2014	Rangan Style		
2014	Matte Satyagraha	Raje Gowda	Karnataka State Film Award for Best Supporting Actor
2014	Sadagara		
2014	Just Love	Dheerendra Gowda	
2014	Savaari 2	Police Commissioner	
2014	Nakara		
2014	Usirigintha Neene Hattira		
2014	Jaggi		
2014	Central Jail		
2014	Pandya		
2014	Thirupathi Express		
2015	Shivam		
2015	DK	MP Shive Gowda	
2015	Mutthina Maleyali		
2015	Nagaari		
2015	Male Nilluvavarege		
2015	Rebel		
2015	Goolihatti		
2015	Muraari	police officer	
2015	Ranna	Veerappa	
2015	Dove		
2015	Ganga		
2015	Octopus		
2016	Maduveya Mamatheya Kareyole		
2016	Preethiyalli Sahaja		
2016	...Re	Gangaraja / Shobharaj	
2016	Kiragoorina Gayyaligalu		
2016	Kala Bhairava		
2016	Kotigobba 2	Businessman	
2017	Chowka		
2017	Bangara s/o Bangarada Manushya	Minister	
2017	Dada is Back	Delli	
2017	Veera Ranachandi		
2018	Churikatte	Anna	
2018	Dalapathi	Adhipathi	
2018	March 22	Basavana Gowda Patil	
2018	Onthara Bannagalu		
2018	The Villain	Ram's Father	
2019	Bazaar	Yajaman	
2019	Pailwaan	Boxing Coach Vijayendra	
2019	Bharaate	Nayaka	
2019	Odeya	Betappa	
2020	Bicchugatti: Chapter 1 − Dalvayi Dange	Obanna Nayaka	
2021	Shadow		
2022	Bairagee	Minister	
2022	Mata		
2022	Triple Riding	Surappa	
2023	Gowli	Inspector Kalinga	
2023	Siren	Chandra Bose	
2023	Gadhayuddha	Police Commissioner	
2023	Sapta Saagaradaache Ello – Side A	Patila	
2023	Fighter		
2023	Tagaru Palya		
2023	Bad Manners	ACP Gangadhar	
2023	Inamdar	SI Durga	
2023	Mayanagari		
2024	Abbabba	Father Joseph	
2024	Chef Chidambara	Corrupt cop	
2024	Max	Parashuram	
2025	Gajarama	Rudrappa	
2025	Agnyathavasi		
2025	Bhuvanam Gaganam		
2025	Kuladalli Keelyavudo		
2025	Doora Theera Yaana		
2025	Dilmaar	Shaane Gowda	

=== Tamil films ===
Year	Film	Role	Notes
2013	Ethir Neechal	Valli's father	
2013	Pandiya Naadu	Simmakal Ravi	Nominated–Vijay Award for Best Villain
2015	India Pakistan	Sampath	
2015	Massu Engira Masilamani	Anthony	
2016	Thirunaal	Naaga	
2016	Mudinja Ivana Pudi	Businessman	
2016	Kaashmora	Minister	
2017	Bairavaa	Union Minister	
2017	Bongu	Pandian	
2017	Sathriyan	Samuthiram	
2017	Karuppan	Varasanattu Perusu	
2017	Sakka Podu Podu Raja	Kasimedu Das	
2017	Velaikkaran	Doss	
2017	Ulkuthu	Kaaka Mani	
2022	Veerapandiyapuram	Rathnasamy, AKP	Dual roles
2023	Rudhran	Varadha	
2023	Kazhuvethi Moorkkan	Prithvi Kumar	
2023	800	T. K. Hanaan	
2024	Miss You	Minister Singaraayar	
2026	All Pass		

=== Telugu films ===
Year	Film	Role	Notes
2017	Jai Lava Kusa	Misra	Cameo
2018	Aravinda Sametha Veera Raghava	Lashma Reddy	
2019	Saaho	Mani	
2021	Akhanda	Krishnamacharya Perumal	
2022	Sivudu		Dual roles
2023	Vinaro Bhagyamu Vishnu Katha	Rajan	
2023	Ugram	Narasimhareddy Patel	
2023	Kalyanamasthu		
2023	Skanda	Ranjith Reddy	
2025	Odela 2		
2025	Bhairavam	Venkateshwara Rao	
2025	Akhanda 2: Thaandavam	Krishnamacharya Perumal	
2026	Sampradayini Suppini Suddapoosani	MLA Thimmappa	

=== Other language films ===
Year	Film	Role	Language	Notes
2012	Shikari		Malayalam	
2017	Ambar Caterers		Tulu	
2019	Saaho	Mani	Hindi	Partially reshot in Tamil
2025	Pidayi		Tulu	

=== Web series ===
Year	Film	Role	Language	Network	Ref.
2023	Sengalam	Sivagnyanam	Tamil	ZEE5	

== Awards ==
Karnataka State Film Awards

- 2013: Best Supporting Actor: Matthe Satyagraha

Udaya Sunfeast Awards

- 2008 - Won—Best Villain Award for Aa Dinagalu

Airtel Kasturi Awards

- 2008 - Won—Best Villain Award for Aa Dinagalu

Mysore Minerals' Awards

- 2008 - Won—Best Supporting Actor for Aa Dinagalu

Filmfare Awards

- 2008 - Won—Filmfare Award for Best Supporting Actor in Kannada cinema for Aa Dinagalu
- 2013 - Nominated—Filmfare Award for Best Supporting Actor - Kannada for Kaddipudi

South Indian International Movie Awards

- 2012: Nominated, Best Actor in a Negative Role – Kannada: Bheema Theeradalli
- 2014: Nominated, Best Actor in a Negative Role – Kannada: Ambareesha

Santosham Film Awards

- 2012 - Won—Best Supporting Actor - Kannada: Bheema Theeradalli

Bangalore Times Film Awards 2012

- 2012 - Nominated—Best Actor in a Negative Role for Bheema Theeradalli
