= Veera (2013 film) =

- Film poster
- Directed by: Ayyappa P. Sharma
- Written by: Anil Kumar
- Screenplay by: Ayyappa P. Sharma
- Produced by: Ramu
- Starring: Malashri; Komal Kumar; Rahul Dev; Ashish Vidyarthi
- Cinematography: Rajesh Khatta
- Edited by: Lakshman Reddy
- Music by: Hamsalekha
- Production company: Ramu Enterprises
- Release date: 29 March 2013
- Running time: 132 minutes
- Country: India
- Language: Kannada

Veera is a 2013 Indian Kannada language action film directed by Ayyappa P. Sharma and starring Malashri, Rahul Dev and Ashish Vidyarthi in the lead roles. Produced by Ramu Enterprises, the film's soundtrack and lyrics are written by Hamsalekha. The supporting cast features C. R. Simha, Komal, Mukul Dev and Raju Talikote. One of the fight scenes in the film is inspired from Wanted. The film is also dubbed in Hindi as name Veera-The Most Wanted.

== Plot ==
The plot revolves around covert operative Veeralakshmi aka Veera, who is taken care by her step-father police commissioner Garudachar, when she faced prison term for killing a boy. Veera is assigned to track down a gangster RD. RD is involved in a fake note racket in Hong Kong. He has links with Karnataka Home minister Chunchanagadde, who seeks ₹1,000 crore (US$100 million) for election expenses. While RD plans to send the amount, he faces a tough task as he has to confront Veera. She steals diamonds from him and destroys the car, which is used by RD to transport drugs and also kills his aide Alex and brother Joe. Veera seeks vengeance on RD (whose real name is Soma) for killing her brother Manju when they were young. In the process, she also exposes the minister’s links with RD and wins applause from the Chief minister. In the mid-credits scene, Veera heads to another mission in New York.

== Cast ==
- Malashri as Veera Lakshmi aka Veera / Malini Iyer (in-disguise)
- Ashish Vidyarthi as Police commissioner Garudachar
- C. R. Simha as Home Minister Chunchanagatti
- Komal
- Rahul Dev as RD
- Mukul Dev as Joe, RD's brother
- Raju Talikote as Chunchanagatti's PA
- M. N. Lakshmi Devi
- Anantha Velu as Chief Minister
- Sathyadev

== Production ==
=== Development ===
Veera was announced in December 2009, with Malashri returning after a six-month hiatus, following her previous release, Kannadada Kiran Bedi. It was announced that Veera would be produced by her husband Ramu, under his banner Ramu Enterprises. Reports said filming would begin in the first week of December.

=== Casting ===
However, the film went under production only in July 2012, following the signing of Ashish Vidyarthi and Komal Kumar to play pivotal roles. C. R. Simha was signed to play a supporting role in the film, who returned to acting after a sabbatical. Sathyadev was cast to play one of the negative leads.

=== Filming ===
Majority of the filming took place abroad in parts of Southeast Asia such as Bangkok, Hong Kong and Macau. Stuntmen who had previously worked with Jackie Chan were hired to train Malashri to perform the action sequences in the film that involved a motorboat chase and a nine-vehicle cannon blast. Parts of the film were filmed in Bangalore before its completion in November 2012. It included filming for a period of 145 days including 20 days for filming the climax sequence alone. Following filming, dubbing was done at the Akash Studio and Hamsalekha Studio in Bangalore.

== Soundtrack ==
Veera

Soundtrack album by Hamsalekha
- Released: 2013
- Recorded: 2013
- Genre: Feature film soundtrack
- Length: 23:03
- Language: Kannada

Official audio
- Veera - Full Album on YouTube

Hamsalekha composed the film's background score and music for the soundtracks who also penned its lyrics. The album consists of six tracks.

Track listing
No.	Title	Singer(s)	Length
1.	"Dosthi Endare Dhokha"	Hemanth Kumar	3:14
2.	"Indiyana"	Vijay Yesudas	4:25
3.	"Kabadiya"	Raksha	3:41
4.	"Mahalu"	Raghu Dixit	4:07
5.	"Veera"	Chandan	3:29
6.	"Asha Kirana"	Badri Prasad	4:47
Total length:			23:03

== Release ==
The film was given the "U/A" (Parental Guidance) certificate by the Regional Censor Board in early-March 2013. The film released theatrically on 29 March 2013, in over 200 prints across Karnataka, the highest for a Malashri film.

=== Critical response ===
Upon release, it opened to mixed response from critics. G. S. Kumar of The Times of India rated the film 3.5/5 and wrote "Armed with a good script, director Ayyappa P. Sharma has churned out a commercial movie packed with action." He concluded writing, "Malashri has given a neat performance. Rahu Dev, Mukul Dev, Ashish Vidyarthi, CR Simha have done justice to their roles. Komal gives an excellent comic touch. Hamsalekha has contributed a couple of catchy tunes. Rajesh Kata shines with his cinematography". Muralidhara Khajane from The Hindu wrote "Veera is the story of a sister avenging the murder of her brother Manju who was killed during their childhood. The film opens with a commentary on how greedy politicians take advantage of the loopholes in democracy". Y. Maheswara Reddy from DNA wrote "Veera for all its hype disappoints big time. In fact, going by the number of action scenes, dialogues and the pedestrian screenplay, it would seem that director Ayyappa P. Sharma has taken the Kannada film-viewing audience for granted." He added, "the film also lacks any semblance of romance or humour". A critic from Bangalore Mirror wrote "Composer and lyricist, Hamsalekha, seems to be undergoing an identity crisis. For director Ayyappa Sharma whose film Varadanayaka, released recently, this is another film which is actually a series of action and stunt sequences". A critic from Deccan Herald wrote "Veera appears to be another name in Malashree’s list that has been ticked off. Apart from splendid action and Komal’s comedy, there’s little to write home about. The actress’ fans, however, will get their ticket’s poora worth". A Shardhaa from The New Indian Express wrote "Veera is mildly diverting, and feels like a long trailer. Nothing to boast about Hamsalekha's music, which doesn't add much to the loudness and action in the movie. The Verdict: This action packed film is purely for front benchers with no exciting storyline".
