= Gandedhe =

2010 film

- Directed by: Akula Shiva
- Written by: Akula Shiva
- Produced by: Ramu
- Starring: Chiranjeevi Sarja; Ragini Dwivedi
- Cinematography: Muzeer
- Edited by: M. Muniraj
- Music by: Chakri
- Production company: Ramu Enterprises
- Release date: 30 July 2010
- Running time: 126 minutes
- Country: India
- Language: Kannada

Gandedhe is a 2010 Indian Kannada language romantic action film written and directed by Akula Shiva and produced by Ramu of Ramu Enterprises. The film stars Chiranjeevi Sarja and Ragini Dwivedi in the lead roles with Devaraj and Rangayana Raghu in supporting roles. Noted composer Chakri scored the music.

== Plot ==
Krishna (Chiranjeevi) is a poor college going boy who falls in love with his classmate Nandini (Ragini). Nandini is the daughter of a rich landlord Shankare Gowda (Devaraj). Both fall in love and seeks approval from their parents. Nandini's father is much against the alliance and disapproves of the relationship. The rest of the story deals with the methods adopted by Krishna to win over Nandini's family with the help of his friend SMS (Raghu), who has a solution for every issue that Krishna faces.

== Cast ==
- Chiranjeevi Sarja as Krishna
- Ragini Dwivedi as Nandini
- Devaraj as Shankare Gowda
- Rangayana Raghu as SMS
- Sharath Lohitashwa
- Ramesh Bhat
- Aruna Balraj
- Sanketh Kashi
- Gym Ravi
- Sathyajith
- Kempegowda
- Dombara Krishna Suresh
- Pavan Benaka
- Vaijanath Biradar
- Suryanarayana Waali
- Honnavalli Krishna

== Production ==
Ramu, the head of Ramu Enterprises, teamed up with the Telugu film writer Akul Shiva to direct his debut Kannada film in late 2008. He roped in actor Chiranjeevi Sarja to play the lead role. Actress Ragini Dwivedi was also approached and signed into the team. The film was announced to be basically set in a college campus background. The unit shot two songs in and around Singapore for about eight days.

== Soundtrack ==
Gandedhe

Soundtrack album by Chakri
- Released: 2010
- Recorded: 2010
- Genre: Film soundtrack
- Length: 33:06
- Label: Anand Audio Video
- Producer: Chakri

Chakri chronology
Saradaga Kasepu (2010)	Gandedhe (2010)	Wanted (2011)

The music was composed by Chakri and launched on Anand Audio Video.

Track-List
No.	Title	Lyrics	Singer(s)	Length
1.	"Andu Kolladene" (Happy)	Ram Narayan	Sri Krishna	5:09
2.	"Ninna Kadeye Nanna"	Ram Narayan	Karthik, Kousalya	5:19
3.	"Gira Gira Thirugide"	Ram Narayan	Chakri, Anjana Sowmya	4:12
4.	"Andu Kolladene" (Sad)	Shyam Shimoga	Venu, Adarshini	4:32
5.	"Do Something"	Ram Narayan	Simha	4:19
6.	"Nolalyaka Chenni"	Shyam Shimoga	Vasu, Chaitra H. G.	4:16
7.	"Ninna Kadeye Nanna" (Remix)	Ram Narayan	Chakri, Kousalya	5:19
Total length:				33:06

== Reception ==
=== Release ===
The film released on 30 July 2010 across Karnataka.

=== Critical response ===
Shruti Indira Lakshminarayana of Rediff.com scored the film at 1 out of 5 stars and says "Music is by Chakri. Songs fail to make an impact and the lyrics don't help in the least. Most songs come with a heard-it-before feel too. What's more is that they add to the length of the film. Overdramatic dialogues and scenes like the one in which an immersed Ganesha idol helps the hero, who has been thrown into a river by goons, to recover, spoil things further. All in all, a confusing potboiler". A critic from Sify.com wrote "Chakri's music is a big let down. Mujeeb's photography is nothing spectacular though the fight sequences are well choreographed. 'Gandedhe' is a predictable fare with just some good fight scenes thrown in".
