= Hrudaya Haadithu =

- Directed by: M. S. Rajashekar
- Written by: Vamshi
- Screenplay by: Chi. Udaya Shankar
- Based on: Himada Hoovu by Vamshi
- Produced by: S. A. Srinivas; B. P. Somu
- Starring: Ambareesh; Malashri; Bhavya; K. S. Ashwath
- Cinematography: B. C. Gowrishankar
- Edited by: S. Manohar
- Music by: Upendra Kumar
- Production company: Sri Vahini Arts Combines
- Release date: 1991
- Running time: 144 minutes
- Country: India
- Language: Kannada

Hrudaya Haadithu is a 1991 Indian Kannada-language romantic drama film directed by M. S. Rajashekar and produced by S. A. Srinivas & B. P. Somu. The story is based on the novel Himada Hoovu written by Vamshi. The film stars Ambareesh, Bhavya and Malashri and was widely acclaimed for its score and lead actor performances, with Malashri winning a Filmfare Award for her portrayal of a heart patient and Upendra Kumar winning Karnataka State Film Award for Best Music Director for his work on the film's music.

The main lead for the movie was initially supposed to be Shiva Rajkumar but upon completion of the script Parvathamma Rajkumar felt that Ambareesh would be a better fit for the role and so he was cast instead.

== Plot ==
Dr. Prasad is a renowned doctor who has performed many successful, including novel heart surgeries, during his medical practice in India. A group of press reporters visit him to invite him as a guest for an event. When a journalist questions him about the toughest case he has handled, Prasad begins narrating one from his early days as a doctor.

At the start of his career, Prasad meets a mischievous and lively young girl named Asha who has had a history of heart disease. Her rich father, Mahadevayya is prepared to shell out any amount of money to save his daughter. Prasad performs a life-saving surgery on her, but knows that the procedure has only extended her life by a few months to a couple of years. He informs Mahadevayya about it. During this time, unbeknownst to Prasad, Asha has developed feelings towards him. She eventually expresses her desire to marry him, to her father, resulting in her father begging him to accept her last wish. Prasad reveals that he is already married to Dr. Abhilasha, a former classmate of his and rejects the proposal before estranging himself from Asha. Upon learning this, Abhilasha tries to convince Prasad to accept Asha's proposal. He agrees to go through with the marriage after thinking about the effects rejection might have on Asha. Although they marry, Prasad is unable to consummate the marriage as he feels too strongly for his other wife Abhilasha. One day, Asha visits Abhilasha and finds her and Prasad being intimate. Heartbroken, Asha loses her temper and learns later from Abhilasha's parents that the two actually were married before her wedding to Prasad. This worsens her condition, leading to her sudden collapse. Prasad performs a surgery on her attempting to save her life.

In the present, the reporters are curious to know what happened to Asha. Abhilasha and Asha both enter the living room where they were all seated; Prasad introduces them both as his wives, letting everyone know the surgery was a success.

== Cast ==
- Ambareesh as Dr. Prasad
- Bhavya as Dr. Abhilasha
- Malashri as Asha
- K. S. Ashwath as Mahadevayya
- Sundar Krishna Urs as Raja Rao, Abhilasha's father
- Girija Lokesh as Abhilasha's mother
- M. S. Umesh as Ranganathaiah, Mahadevayya's manager
- Balaraj
- M. S. L. Murthy

== Soundtrack ==
The film score was composed by Upendra Kumar, with lyrics by Chi. Udaya Shankar. All the songs, especially "Naliyuthaa" and "Kannalli Jyothi", were extremely well received.

Track listing
No.	Title	Lyrics	Singer(s)	Length
1.	"Naliyuthaa"	Chi. Udaya Shankar	Rajkumar
2.	"Kannalli Jyothi"	Chi. Udaya Shankar	Manjula Gururaj
3.	"Giri Navilu Yello"	Chi. Udaya Shankar	S. P. Balasubrahmanyam, Manjula Gururaj
4.	"Thampada Gaali Beesali"	Chi. Udaya Shankar	S. P. Balasubrahmanyam
5.	"O Nanna Mallige"	Chi. Udaya Shankar	S. P. Balasubrahmanyam
