= Eshwar Alla =

1998 Indian film by Ayyappa P. Sharma

Eshwar Allah
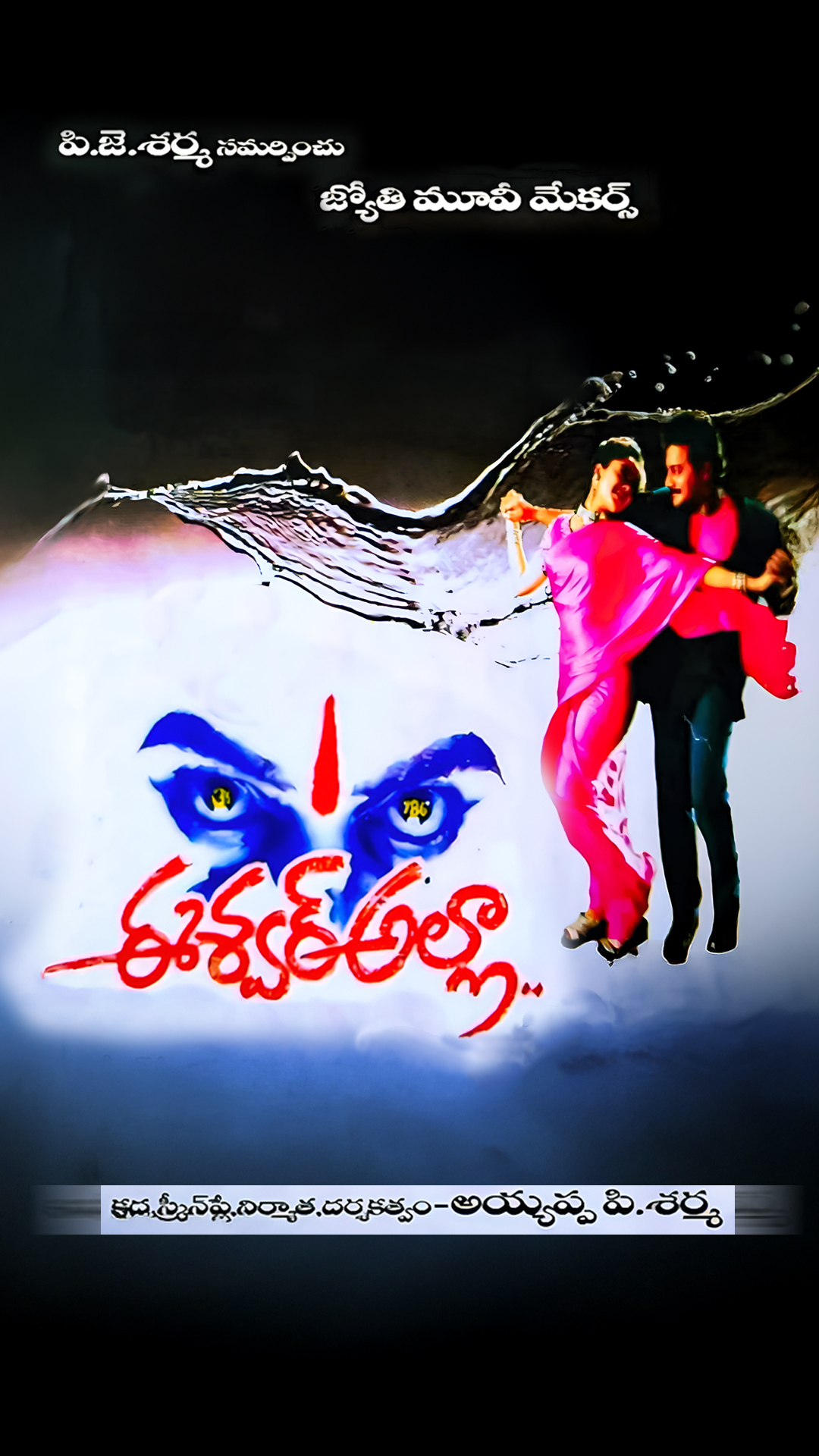
- Movie poster
- Directed by: Ayyappa P. Sharma
- Written by: Ayyappa P. Sharma
- Produced by: Ayyappa P. Sharma
- Starring: P. Sai Kumar; Soundarya
- Cinematography: Chota K. Naidu
- Edited by: Gautham Raju
- Music by: Koti
- Production company: Jyothi Movie Makers
- Release date: 1998
- Running time: 135 minutes
- Country: India
- Language: Telugu

Eshwar Allah is a 1998 Indian Telugu-language action drama film written, directed and produced by Ayyappa P. Sharma through Jyothi Movie Makers. The film features P. Sai Kumar and Soundarya in lead roles. The film won the prestigious Sarojini Devi Award for a Film on National Integration at the Andhra Pradesh State Nandi Awards 1998 which was received by Ayyppa P. Sharma as Producer and Director.

== Plot ==
Eshwar Allah is a socially impactful film that revolves around Kranthi, an orphan raised with strong values of humanism and secularism. Set in a peaceful mixed-community colony of Hindus and Muslims, the story takes a sharp turn when a group of self-serving political leaders deliberately incite communal riots between the two communities. Their hidden agenda is to evict the residents and illegally seize the land for personal gain. Amidst the rising tensions, Kranthi stands as a lone warrior, trying to stop the spread of hatred and violence. He brings to light the manipulations of these politicians and appeals to the people’s conscience, reminding them of their shared humanity beyond religion. Through courage, sacrifice, and relentless effort, Kranthi inspires unity among the residents, ultimately thwarting the conspirators' plans and restoring peace in the colony. The film delivers a powerful message on national integration, portraying the idea that "God is one – whether called Eshwar or Allah", and emphasizes living beyond religious and caste boundaries.

== Cast ==
- P. Sai Kumar as Kranthi
- Soundarya as Durga Bhavani
- P. J. Sarma as Badhshaw
- Rallapalli as Journalist
- Devadas Kanakala as Vishnumurthy
- Achyuth as Collector
- Kaikala Satyanarayana as Ibhrahim
- Narra Venkateswara Rao as Politicean
- Ali as Kranthi Friend
- Subhalekha Sudhakar as Kranthi Friend
- Suthi Velu as Kranthi Gardien

== Music ==
- Lyrics: Sirivennela Seetharama Sastry, Bhuvana Chandra, Pamula Ramachandra Rao, Jaladantki Sudhakar
- Singers: S.P. Balasubrahmanyam, K. J. Yesudas, Mano, Raj-Koti, Ram Chakravarthi, K.S Chithra, Lalitha Sagari, Saikumar
- Music: Koti

== Awards ==
- Nandi Award for Sarojini Devi Award for a Film on National Integration – 1998
