= Election (2013 film) =

- Film poster
- Directed by: Om Prakash Rao
- Screenplay by: Om Prakash Rao
- Produced by: Ramu
- Starring: Malashri; Pradeep Rawat
- Cinematography: Rajesh Katta
- Edited by: Lakshman
- Music by: Hamsalekha
- Production company: Ramu Enterprises
- Release date: 23 May 2013
- Running time: 136 minutes
- Country: India
- Language: Kannada

Election is a 2013 Indian Kannada-language action drama film directed by Om Prakash Rao and produced by Ramu under the banner Ramu Enterprises. The film stars Malashri in the lead role. The supporting cast features Pradeep Rawat, Dev Gill, Sharath Lohitashwa, Hanumanthegowda and Suchendra Prasad. The film was later dubbed in Hindi as Sher E Jigar in 2018 on WAM.

== Cast ==
- Malashri as Indira
- Pradeep Rawat as Narasimha
- Dev Gill as Deviprasad
- Srinivasa Murthy
- Lohithaswa as Vishwanath
- Hanumanthegowda as Gangadhara
- Suchendra Prasad as Ramaswamy
- Sadhu Kokila
- Bullet Prakash
- Ganesh Rao Kesarkar
- Shobaraj
- Mallesh Gowda
- Mahesh Dev
- G. K. Govinda Rao
- Param Gubbi
- Keerthiraj
- Meghana Naidu as an item number

== Production ==
=== Filming ===
The filming of Election began on 8 December 2012 in Bangalore.

=== Pre-release revenues ===
The satellite rights of the film were sold for ₹2.5 crore (US$260,000).

== Soundtrack ==
No.	Title	Singer(s)	Length
1.	"Othro Vote"	Malgudi Subha

== Reception ==
Election received mixed to negative response from critics upon its theatrical release. G. S. Kumar of The Times of India gave the film a rating of three out of five and wrote, "Director N Omprakash Rao has done a good job of a story that helps you understand the lifestyle of politicians, how they indulge in goondaism, sex and luring voters with gifts, including money." and praised the role of acting and cinematography in the film.
