= Suchendra Prasad =

Indian actor (born 1973)

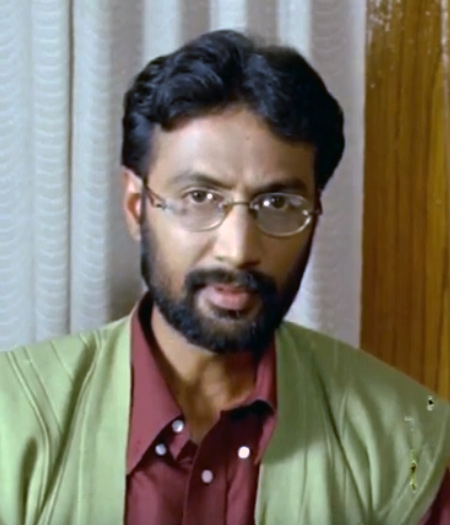
- Suchendra Prasad (Beru, 2005 Kannada film)
- Born: 1972 (age 53–54); Karnataka, India
- Education: Master of Arts, Bachelor of Laws
- Occupations: Actor, director, playwright
- Years active: 1994–present
- Spouse: Mallika Prasad Sinha (m. 2002; div. 2006)
- Partner: Pavitra Lokesh (2007–2018)
- Children: 2

K. Suchendra Prasad (born 1 May 1972) is an Indian actor, director, and playwright known for his work in Kannada cinema, television, and theatre. He began his career in the 1990s. Over the years, he has worked across film, television, and stage, and has been involved in productions that have received national recognition.

== Early life and education ==
Suchendra Prasad was born in Bengaluru, Karnataka, and has ancestral roots in Kannauj, Uttar Pradesh. He holds a Bachelor of Laws (LLB) degree and a Master of Arts (MA). He has been associated with the National School of Drama (NSD), where he worked as a tutor and later contributed to the Regional Resource Centre in Karnataka, focusing on stagecraft and folk traditions.

== Career ==
Suchendra Prasad has appeared in Kannada cinema and television, including his role in Kanooru Heggadithi (1999), a film that received national recognition. He has also worked in a large number of television productions and has collaborated on various commercial and parallel cinema projects.

His directorial projects include: Prapaatha (2010), Sangdhigdha, Ekacharam (2022), Maavu Bevu (2023), and Padmagandhi (2025).

He has been associated with cultural and literary organizations, including Samskara Bharati, where he has held a leadership role in Karnataka.

== Filmography ==
=== Director ===
- Prapaatha (2010)
- Ekacharam (2022; Sanskrit)
- Maavu Bevu (2023)
- Padmagandhi (2025)

=== Actor ===
- Galige (1994)
- Kanooru Heggadithi (1999)...Hoovayya
- Beru (2005)...Raghunandan
- Thutturi (2006)
- Avva (2008)
- Varasdara (2008)
- Jolly Days (2009)...College Principal
- Parole (2010)
- Bettada Jeeva (2011) ...Shivaramu
- Suicide (2011)
- Gaggara (2011) (Tulu)...Shankara
- Shyloo (2011)...Bhaskar
- Ball Pen (2012)...Srinivasaiah
- Bheema Theeradalli (2012)...Shashikant Desai
- Drama (2012)...Shalivahana
- Attahasa (2013)...DCF Srinivas
- Election (2013)
- Madarangi (2013)
- Bhairavi (2013)
- Tony (2013)
- Gharshane (2014)
- Haggada Kone (2014)...Jailor
- Simhadri (2014)...Prakash Gowda
- Kwatle Satisha (2014)... Doctor
- Drishya (2014)
- Raja Rajendra (2015)
- Rhaatee (2015)
- Daksha (2015)
- Vidaaya (2015)
- Plus (2015)
- Ganga (2015)
- Vascodigama (2015)
- 1944 (2016)
- Badmaash (2016)
- Lee (2017)
- Marali Manege (2017)
- Bharjari (2017)
- Hombanna (2017)
- Raju Kannada Medium (2018)
- Krishna Tulasi (2018)
- Buckasura (2018)
- Kannadakkagi Ondannu Otthi (2018)
- Ananthu Vs Nusrath (2018)
- Kannada Deshadol (2018)
- Paradesi C/o London (2018)
- Chemistry of Kariyappa (2019)
- Ammana Mane (2019)
- Face 2 Face (2019)
- Majjige Huli (2019)
- Aadi Lakshmi Puraana (2019)
- Ranganayaki Volume 1: Virginity (2019)
- Shakeela (2020; Hindi)
- Roberrt (2021)...Thanu's father
- Lanke (2021)
- James (2022)...Jessie's father
- Wheelchair Romeo (2022)...Prasad
- O (2022)
- Mayanagari (2023)
- Guns and Roses (2025)...Rajesh Varma
- Timmana Mottegalu (2025)...Vijay Kumar
- Jaganmathe Akkamahadevi (2026)
- Sarkari Shale H8 (2026)
- Calendar (2026)

=== Dubbing artist ===
- Pawan Singh - Wrong Number (2003)
