= Purusha Lakshanam =

- Poster
- Directed by: K. S. Ravikumar
- Screenplay by: K. S. Ravikumar
- Story by: P. Vasu
- Produced by: M. Narendiran
- Starring: Jayaram; Khushbu
- Cinematography: Ashok Rajan
- Edited by: K. Thanikachalam
- Music by: Deva
- Production company: Good Luck Films
- Release date: 3 December 1993
- Country: India
- Language: Tamil

Purusha Lakshanam (transl. Characteristic of a great man) is a 1993 Indian Tamil-language drama film, written and directed by K. S. Ravikumar from a story by P. Vasu. The film stars Jayaram and Khushbu. It was released on 3 December 1993. The film was remade as Bhale Pellam in Telugu and in Mangalya Bandhana in Kannada.

== Plot ==
Nandagopal works as a managing director in a company. Abhirami "Ammu", a carefree college student, falls in love with Nandagopal at first sight, while Anju also loves him, but it is one sided. Finally, Nandagopal accepts to get married with Ammu. Raja was Ammu's classmate and was in love with her, so he wants to take revenge on her. Raja begins to compel Ammu, and challenges to marry her. One day, Raja hugs Ammu in front of Nandagopal, Nandagopal thinks that his wife has an affair with Raja and he expels Ammu. What transpires later forms the crux of the story.

== Cast ==
- Jayaram as Nandagopal
- Khushbu as Abhirami (Ammu)
- Anju as Anju
- R. Sundarrajan as Rajgopal
- Srividya as Vidya
- Raja Ravindra as Raja
- Charle as Rajesh
- K. S. Ravikumar as Madhavan Nair
- Idichapuli Selvaraj
- Loose Mohan
- Major Sundarrajan
- Thyagu
- Pandu
- Kumarimuthu
- Shanmugasundari as Shanmugasundari
- Indraja

== Production ==
P. Vasu wrote the story with Khushbu in mind, and she accepted. Though Khusbhu had fever on the first day of shooting, she concealed this from director K. S. Ravikumar to prevent production delays.

== Soundtrack ==
The music was composed by Deva and lyrics were written by Kalidasan.

Song	Singers	Length
"Anna Salai"	K. S. Chithra	04:51
"Kaakai Chiraginile"	S. P. Balasubrahmanyam, K. S. Chithra	04:42
"Kum Kum Kumbakonam"	S. Janaki	04:20
"Mundhanaiye Naan"	Mano	04:57
"Oru Thaali"	K. S. Chithra	05:22
"Sempattu Poove"	S. P. Balasubrahmanyam, K. S. Chithra	04:12

== Reception ==
Malini Mannath of The Indian Express wrote "P. Vasu's story gets a serious turn, the director gets a grip [..] and the film manages to keep the viewers engrossed in the proceedings." K. Vijiyan of New Straits Times praised Khushboo's performance and Ravikumar's direction, saying he "has managed to keep the pace light and full of delightful moments for first three quarters of the movie". Kalki wrote that the film was moving at a brisk pace despite having elements like thaali sentiment and devotional song. K. S. Chithra won the Cinema Express Award for Best Playback Singer (Female) at the 14th Cinema Express Awards.
