= Tushar Ranganath =

Indian film director (1974–2011)

- Born: 31 March 1974; Bangalore, Karnataka
- Died: 20 December 2011 (aged 37); Bangalore, Karnataka
- Occupations: screenwriter, lyricist, director

Tushar Ranganath (31 March 1974 – 20 December 2011), also known as Ranganth or Ranganna, was a Kannada cinema director. Born and raised in Bangalore, India, Ranganath made his directorial debut with Gulama. He died due to cardiac arrest on 20 December 2011.

== Filmography ==
Director

- Gulama (2009)
- Kanteerava (2010)
- Sugreeva (2010)

Writer

- Gandhinagara (2003)
- Rakshasa (2005)
- Namma Basava (2005)
- Auto Shankar (2005)
- Suntaragaali (2006)
- Duniya (2006)
- Masti (2007)
- Anatharu (2007)
- Aramane (2008)
- Gange Baare Thunge Baare (2008)
- Kannadadda Kiran Bedi (2009)
- Swayamvara (2010)
- Devru (2010)
- Kari Chirathe (2010)
- Aithalakkadi (2010)
- Prem Adda (2012)
