= Face 2 Face (2019 Indian film) =

2019 Kannada film

- Film poster
- Directed by: Sandeep Janardan
- Produced by: Sumithra B K
- Starring: Rohith Bhanuprakash; Divya Uruduga; Purvi Joshi
- Cinematography: Vishwajith Rao
- Edited by: Sri Crazy Mindzz
- Music by: Ek Khwaab-The band
- Release date: 15 March 2019
- Running time: 109 minutes
- Country: India
- Language: Kannada

Face 2 Face is a 2019 Indian Kannada romantic thriller film directed by Sandeep Janardhan and starring Rohith Bhanuprakash, Divya Uruduga and Purvi Joshi.

== Plot ==
The film revolves around three characters: Santhosh, Sneha and Preethi. Santhosh is in love with Preethi, but a small incident changes the situation. Santhosh struggles to get his love back with the help of Sneha, who has just applied for a divorce from her husband. This continues to show three parallel stories - one about the possessive mother, a romantic story and a tale of a friendship.

== Cast ==
- Rohith Bhanuprakash as Santhosh
- Divya Uruduga as Sneha
- Purvi Joshi as Preethi
- Aaryan Achukatla as Vikruth
- Suchendra Prasad
- Veena Sundar
- Yamuna Srinidhi

== Soundtrack ==
Face 2 Face

Soundtrack album by Ek Khwaab-The band
- Genre: Film soundtrack
- Label: PRK Audio

No.	Title	Lyrics	Singer(s)	Length
1.	"Baayaarike"	Jayanth Kaikini	Armaan Malik
2.	"Nindhe Haavali"	Kaviraj	Vijay Prakash, Ananya Bhat
3.	"Ibbani Haniyondu"	Vishwajith Rao	K. S. Chithra
4.	"Ee Mussanje"	Vishwajith Rao	Haricharan
5.	"Title Track"	Dhananjay Ranjan	Ananya Bhat

== Release ==
=== Theatrical ===
The film released on 15 March 2019.

=== Critical reception ===
Reviewer Shashiprasad S. M from Deccan Chronicle gave the film a rating of 3/5 and wrote "the entertaining surprises coupled with dialogues and the performances of the characters elevates face to face to another level. There are also good number of negatives in the narrative when it starts throwing away too much of information but the end is what matters to make it a good watch" Vivek M V of Deccan Herald gave the film a rating of 3/5 and stated "The film also tries to fit in nods to current affairs like the growing debate on dubbing in Kannada and the growing competition between telephone networks. It aims a sly dig at film critics." A The New Indian Express critic A Sharadhaa gave the film a rating of 2.5/5 and says" Technically, Face 2 Face has its own cinematic beauty, credit for which goes to cinematographer Vishwajith Rao, whose picturisation explains the story better."
