= Ayyappa P. Sharma =

Indian actor

- Born: Pudipeddi Ayyappa Sharma; 22 January 1969 (age 57); Madras, Tamil Nadu, India
- Occupations: Actor; director; voice actor
- Years active: 1996–present
- Spouse: Kavitha
- Children: 2
- Father: P. J. Sarma
- Relatives: P. Sai Kumar (brother); P. Ravi Shankar (brother); Aadi (nephew)

Pudipeddi Ayyappa Sharma (born 22 January 1969), known professionally as Ayyappa P. Sharma, is an Indian actor, director and voice actor who primarily works in Telugu and Kannada films. Sharma made his directorial debut with the Kannada film Aayudha (1996) and later gained critical acclaim for the Telugu film Eshwar Alla (1998) which won him a Nandi Award.

He expanded to lead acting with Gharshane (2014) and has since appeared in supporting roles in KGF: Chapter 1 (2018), Akhanda (2021), Bimbisara (2022), Shivam Bhaje (2024) and Kingdom (2025).

== Early life ==
Ayyappa P. Sharma was born into a family with a film background in Madras (now Chennai), Tamil Nadu. He is the youngest son of renowned Telugu actors P. J. Sarma and Krishna Jyothi. He has two elder brothers, P. Sai Kumar and P. Ravi Shankar, both of whom are prominent actors. They also have two sisters – Priya and Kamala.

== Career ==
Sharma began his career as a director with the Kannada film Aayudha (1996). Subsequently, his debut Telugu film Eshwar Alla (1998) gained critical acclaim and won the Nandi Award for a Film on National Integration. He also served as the producer of the film. Kannada film Varadhanayaka (2013) was his major successful film at the box-office received the award. He became a full-fledged actor, playing the lead role in the Kannada film Gharshane (2014). Since then, he has been active as an actor and dubbing artist. He received critical acclaim for his role as Vanaram in the Kannada film KGF: Chapter 1 (2018). His performance as Ketu in the Telugu film Bimbisara (2022) was also appreciated.

== Filmography ==
=== As an actor ===
| Year | Title | Role | Language | Notes |
|---|---|---|---|---|
| 2001 | Hyderabad | Das | Telugu | Also director and writer |
| 2003 | Hrudayavantha | | Kannada | |
| 2003 | Partha | Krishna | Kannada | |
| 2004 | Bhagawan | | Kannada | |
| 2005 | Slokam | | Telugu | |
| 2014 | Gharshane | ACP Ganesh | Kannada | Debut in lead role |
| 2014 | Masterpiece | Danny | Kannada | |
| 2016 | Lacchimdeviki O Lekkundi | | Telugu | |
| 2016 | Manamantha | Dass | Telugu | |
| 2017 | Katamarayudu | Juttu Ranga | Telugu | |
| 2017 | Baahubali 2: The Conclusion | Royal Priest | Telugu | |
| 2017 | Tiger Galli | | Kannada | |
| 2018 | Aravinda Sametha Veera Raghava | | Telugu | |
| 2018 | KGF: Chapter 1 | Vanaram | Kannada | |
| 2019 | Bharaate | Veerappa Nayaka | Kannada | |
| 2019 | Tenali Ramakrishna BA. BL | Simhadri Naidu | Telugu | |
| 2021 | Annaatthe | Manoj's henchman | Tamil | |
| 2021 | Akhanda | Prachanda | Telugu | |
| 2022 | Bheemla Nayak | Prisoner | Telugu | Cameo appearance in the song "Bheemla Nayak" |
| 2022 | KGF: Chapter 2 | Vanaram | Kannada | |
| 2022 | Avatara Purusha | Brahma Jois | Kannada | |
| 2022 | Bhala Thandanana | Chakri | Telugu | |
| 2022 | Bimbisara | Kethu | Telugu | |
| 2022 | Thaggedele | | Telugu | |
| 2023 | Mr. Bachelor | | Kannada | |
| 2023 | Michael | Swamy | Telugu | |
| 2023 | Gadayuddha | | Kannada | |
| 2023 | Marakastra | | Kannada | |
| 2023 | Chandramukhi 2 | Rudraiyya | Tamil | |
| 2024 | Avatara Purusha 2 | Brahma Jois | Kannada | |
| 2024 | Shivam Bhaje | | Telugu | |
| 2024 | Kanguva | Vijuran | Tamil | |
| 2025 | Hari Hara Veera Mallu | Abdullah | Telugu | |
| 2025 | Kingdom | Bhairagi | Telugu | |
| 2025 | Coolie | Ayyappan | Tamil | |
| 2025 | Baahubali: The Epic | Royal Priest | Telugu | Combined recut version of The Beginning and The Conclusion |
| 2025 | Akhanda 2: Thaandavam | Prachanda | Telugu | |
| 2025 | Vrusshabha | | Telugu | Partially reshot in Malayalam |
| 2026 | Mrithyunjay | Jay’s friend | Telugu | |

=== As director and writer ===
| Year | Title | Credited as | | Language | Notes |
| Year | Title | Director | Writer | Language | Notes |
|---|---|---|---|---|---|
| 1996 | Aayudha | Yes | Story | Kannada | |
| 1998 | Eshwar Alla | Yes | Yes | Telugu | Also producer; Nandi Award for a Film on National Integration |
| 2000 | Durgada Huli | Yes | Screenplay | Kannada | |
| 2001 | Hyderabad | Yes | Yes | Telugu | Also actor |
| 2002 | Janam | Yes | Yes | Telugu | |
| 2013 | Varadhanayaka | Yes | No | Kannada | |
| 2013 | Veera | Yes | Screenplay | Kannada | |

=== Television ===
| Year | Title | Network |
|---|---|---|
| 2023 | Mansion 24 | Disney+ Hotstar |
