= Timmana Mottegalu =

2025 Kannada film directed by Rakshith Thirthahalli

- Theatrical release poster
- Directed by: Rakshith Thirthahalli
- Written by: Rakshith Thirthahalli
- Produced by: Adarsh Iyengar
- Starring: Keshav Guttalike; Suchendra Prasad; Ashika Somashekar; Sringeri Ramanna; Raghu Ramanakoppa; Pragati Prabhu; Master Harsha
- Cinematography: Praveen S
- Edited by: B S Kemparaju
- Music by: Hemanth Jois
- Production company: SriKrishna Productions
- Release date: 27 June 2025
- Country: India
- Language: Kannada

Timmana Mottegalu is a 2025 Indian Kannada-language drama film written and directed by Rakshith Thirthahalli. It is produced by Adarsh Iyengar under the banner of Srikrishna Productions. The film stars Keshav Guttalike, Suchendra Prasad, Ashika Somashekar, Sringeri Ramanna, Raghu Ramanakoppa, Pragati Prabhu and Master Harsha in pivotal roles.

Set in the Malenadu region of Karnataka, the film explores the life of a villager facing personal and environmental challenges while delving into themes of faith, survival and the human connection with nature.

The film was released theatrically on 27 June 2025.

== Plot ==
Set in the dense forests of the Western Ghats, Timmana Mottegalu follows Timma, a poor father desperate to secure his sons education and rebuild their crumbling hut. With no options left, he agrees to a risky tasktracking the elusive king cobra, its eggs, and neston the request of a renowned snake expert, Vijaykumar. What begins as a desperate mission soon spirals into a journey filled with confusion, inner conflict, and unexpected courage, shaped by the necessity and inevitability of survival.

== Cast ==
- Keshav Guttalike as Timma
- Suchendra Prasad as Vijay Kumar
- Ashika Somashekar as Hita
- Sringeri Ramanna as Venkataiah
- Raghu Ramanakoppa
- Pragati Prabhu
- Master Harsha as Timma's son

== Soundtrack ==
The soundtrack and background score for Timmana Mottegalu were composed by Hemanth Jois, with lyrics by Rakshith Thirthahalli. The lead single Edeya Dani, sung by producer Adarsh Iyengar, was released prior to the film's theatrical release.

Song	Singer	Music composer	Lyrics
Kaadu Daari	Vasuki Vaibhav	Hemanth Jois	Rakshith Thirthahalli
Moodana Paduvana	Aishwarya Rangarajan	Hemanth Jois	Rakshith Thirthahalli
Edeya Dani	Chinmayee Chandrashekar, Adarsh Iyengar	Hemanth Jois	Rakshith Thirthahalli

== Reception ==
=== Critical reception ===
Timmana Mottegalu received positive reviews from critics. Cinema Express rated the film 3/5 and praised it as "a slow-burning fable of forest, faith and fate" and appreciated its poetic narrative and cinematography. The Times of India gave the film a 3.5/5 rating, commending its depiction of rural hardships and ecological themes. A critic from Bangalore Mirror rated the film 3/5 and wrote, "The movie is worth a watch for those who enjoy movies about nature".
