= Solillada Saradara =

- Title card
- Directed by: Om Sai Prakash
- Written by: Om Sai Prakash
- Produced by: K. Prabhakar
- Starring: Ambareesh; Malashri; Bhavya
- Cinematography: Mallikarjun
- Edited by: Narasaiah
- Music by: Hamsalekha
- Production company: Vijay Films
- Release date: 1992
- Running time: 129 minutes
- Country: India
- Language: Kannada

Solillada Saradara (transl. Leader without defeat) is a 1992 Indian Kannada-language romantic drama film directed and written by Om Sai Prakash and produced by K. Prabhakar. The film stars Ambareesh, Malashri and Bhavya.

== Cast ==
- Ambareesh as Krishna
- Malashri as Radha
- Bhavya as Rukmini
- Doddanna as Diwan
- Om Sai Prakash as Radha's Father
- Mukhyamantri Chandru as Rukmini's father, a landlord
- Jaggesh as Manohar, Diwan's illegitimate son
- Mysore Lokesh as Ramegowda
- Dingri Nagaraj as Tippeshi
- Padma Kumta as Bhadra
- Kaminidharan
- Ashalatha
- Rathnakar as a priest
- A. S. Murthy
- Killer Venkatesh as Veerabhadra
- Manjumalini as a villager

== Soundtrack ==
The music of the film was composed and lyrics written by Hamsalekha. Audio was released on Lahari Music.

All tracks are written by Hamsalekha.

Track listing
No.	Title	Singer(s)	Length
1.	"Kaveramma Kapadamma"	S. P. Balasubrahmanyam	4:37
2.	"Jogayya Jogayya"	S. P. Balasubrahmanyam, K. S. Chithra	4:45
3.	"Ee Kannada Mannanu"	S. P. Balasubrahmanyam	5:13
4.	"Yaarigaagi Hele"	K. S. Chithra, Manjula Gururaj	5:10
5.	"Jigi Jigi Bombeyata"	K. Shivaram	4:58
6.	"Premavendarenu Helabaradenu"	K. S. Chithra], Manjula Gururaj	5:12
Total length:			29:55
