= Gooli =

- Directed by: P. N. Sathya
- Produced by: Ramu
- Starring: Sudeepa; Mamta Mohandas
- Edited by: Munraj
- Music by: Anoop Seelin
- Production company: Ramu Enterprises
- Release date: 21 March 2008
- Country: India
- Language: Kannada

Gooli is a 2008 Indian Kannada-language action film, directed by P. N. Sathya. It stars Sudeep, Mamta Mohandas (her Kannada debut) in lead roles. The film is produced by Ramu under the banner Ramu Enterprises and music is by Anoop Seelin. The film was later dubbed into Hindi as Sabse Bada Mawali in 2009 and into Tamil as Korukkupettai Kooli in 2012.

== Plot ==
Gooli (Sudeep) is an uneducated, rude youngster as well as a deadly, merciless, cruel rowdy with whom a girl named Ramya (Mamta) accidentally falls in love by seeing his pure and unadulterated heart. Ramya continues to keep in touch with Gooli despite opposition from her family, and although Gooli tries to keep Ramya at a distance, he finds he has also fallen in love with her. They marry but separate shortly afterwards. Later, Gooli hears shocking news about the apparent death of Ramya; however, she is not dead but in a mental asylum due to severe brain damage.

== Cast ==
- Sudeep as Gooli
- Mamta Mohandas as Ramya
- Kishore as ACP Devaraj
- Lakshman Rao as Ramya's elder brother
- Bhavya
- Rajashekhar
- Yethiraaj as Gooli's sidekick
- P. N. Sathya as Seena
- Rekha V. Kumar

== Production ==
This film marks the second collaboration of actor Sudeep with producer Ramu after Kiccha(2003) and also director P. N. Sathya's only collaboration with Sudeepa. Debutant Anoop Seelin is the music director replacing director's regular collaborator Sadhu Kokila. Actress Mamta Mohandas made her debut in Kannada Cinema with this film.

== Soundtrack ==
The film's soundtrack was composed by Anoop Seelin, replacing director P. N. Sathya's regular collaborator Sadhu Kokila.

Gooli

Soundtrack album by Anoop Seelin
- Released: 2008
- Recorded: 2008
- Genre: Feature film soundtrack
- Label: T-Series

Anoop Seelin chronology
Gooli (2008)	Eddelu Manjunatha (2009)

No.	Title	Singer(s)	Length
1.	"Kaddu Kaddu"	Rajesh Krishnan, K. S. Chithra	5:01
2.	"Summ Sumne Yako"	Karthik, Nanditha	4:51
3.	"Jeevana Hudukutha"	Hariharan	5:12
4.	"Dealige Dealu"	Shankar Mahadevan, K. S. Chithra, P. Sathya	5:04
5.	"Gooli"	Rajesh Krishnan	4:46

== Reception ==
A critic from Rediff.com wrote that "Gooli is a great watch for Sudeep's fans who were waiting to see him in an action film for a long time. As for the others, they better start believing that the Sudeep-Sathya combination rocks". A critic from Sify wrote that the film "is not the run of the mill gangster film that you see these days in Kannada". A critic from Deccan Herald wrote that "Watch out for Sudeep's excellent acting and engrossing story".
