= Raja Kempu Roja =

- Directed by: S. Umesh
- Produced by: Raviraj
- Starring: Tiger Prabhakar; Malashri; Tara; Raviraj
- Cinematography: B. S. Basavaraj
- Edited by: S. Umesh
- Music by: Upendra Kumar
- Production company: Vijaya Cine Creations
- Release date: 1990
- Running time: 119 minutes
- Country: India
- Language: Kannada

Raja Kempu Roja is a 1990 Indian Kannada-language action drama film directed, written and edited by S. Umesh and produced by Raviraj. The film features Tiger Prabhakar, Malashri and Tara. The film's music was composed by Upendra Kumar.

== Cast ==
- Tiger Prabhakar as Anand
- Malashri
- Raviraj
- Vajramuni
- Tara
- Sundar Krishna Urs
- Dheerendra Gopal
- Shivaram
- M. S. Umesh
- Tennis Krishna
- Dinesh
- Vishwa Vijetha
- Bank Janardhan
- Mysore Lokesh

== Soundtrack ==
The soundtrack of the film was composed by Upendra Kumar.

Track listing
No.	Title	Lyrics	Singer(s)	Length
1.	"Sakhi Yare Karedavaru"	Chi. Udayashankar	S. P. Balasubrahmanyam, S. Janaki	05:10
2.	"Gulabi Rango Rangu"	Sri Ranga	S. P. Balasubrahmanyam, Manjula Gururaj	04:59
3.	"Bhanu Bhoomi Seridante"	Chi. Udayashankar	S. P. Balasubrahmanyam, Manjula Gururaj	05:00
4.	"Ee Haalu Solle Kadidaga"	Sri Ranga	S. P. Balasubrahmanyam, Manjula Gururaj	05:08
5.	"Aathura Thori Aadida Maathu"	Doddarangegowda	S. P. Balasubrahmanyam	05:04
6.	"Savi Nenapu Adeko Kaane"	M. N. Vyasa Rao	S. Janaki	05:14
