= Kannadadda Kiran Bedi =

Kannadada Kiran Bedi
- DVD Cover
- Directed by: Om Prakash Rao
- Written by: Om Prakash Rao
- Screenplay by: Tushar Ranganath
- Produced by: Ramu
- Starring: Malashri; Srinivasa Murthy; Rangayana Raghu; Ashish Vidyarthi; Sayaji Shinde
- Cinematography: K. M. Vishnuvardhan
- Edited by: Deepu. R. Kumar
- Music by: Hamsalekha
- Production company: Ramu Enterprises
- Release date: 27 March 2009
- Running time: 159 minutes
- Country: India
- Language: Kannada

Kannadadda Kiran Bedi (alternatively spelled as Kannadada Kiran Bedi, lit. 'Kannada Kiran Bedi') is a 2009 Indian Kannada action drama film starring Malashri in the lead role with Srinivasa Murthy, Rangayana Raghu and Ashish Vidyarthi in pivotal roles.

The film was released on 27 March to mixed reviews but was a box-office hit. The film has also been dubbed into Hindi as Mumbai Ki Kiran Bedi, in Telugu as Andhra Kiran Bedi, in Tamil as Tamil Kiran Bedi and in Malayalam as Kerala Kiran Bedi.

== Plot ==
A police constable, Venkatappa meets Bellary Bhagyalakshmi, a fraud and tells her his daughter, Kiran Bedi's story. Kiran was a police officer in Bangalore and resembled Bellary. There is a crime nexus run by Bhoopathy, his partners Naga, Mobile Nachappa, D'Souza and Muni in Bangalore. Bhoopathy's son Vicky murders a young civil service student, Shweta. Bhoopathy hides Vicky in Bhadramma's house in Madurai, Tamil Nadu. Kiran finds Vicky and kills him and Bhadramma. Bhoopathy, in a fit of rage, manages to kill Kiran. Venkatappa now requests Bellary to become Kiran Bedi and finish Bhoopathy and his associates. Bellary accepts after listening to the story and being paid for it. Bellary targets the whole nexus of Bhoopathy and takes them down. But soon Bellary's identity is revealed in the court. Full of remorse, she enters civil services and becomes a real police officer finishing Bhoopathy.

== Cast ==
- Malashri as double role
  - DCP Kiran Bedi
  - ACP Bellary Bhagyalakshmi
- Srinivasa Murthy as Constable Venkatappa
- Ashish Vidyarthi as Bhoopathy
- Rangayana Raghu as Mobile Nachappa
- Telangana Shakuntala as Bhadramma
- Kote as Naga
- Sayaji Shinde
- Siva Parvati as mother of Kiran Bedi

== Production ==
The film began production in 2006.

== Reception ==
=== Critical reception ===
The film received mixed reviews.

The Times of India said "It is a feast for Malashri fans and those who like action movies. It is a treat to watch her in a double role -- fighting rowdies, chasing cars, shooting underworld dons and helping good Samaritans for a crime-free society". Sify wrote "The songs in the background written and composed by Hamsalekha are very meaningful and rise to the occasion. KM Vishuvardhana camera work is splendid. The capturing of many action scenes is not an easy task. Action lovers this is a festival treat!" R G Vijayasarathy of Rediff.com scored the film at 2 out of 5 stars and says "Camera work is another highlight of the film. Hamsalekha shines in the background score though the lyrics tend to get drowned in the music. In a nutshell, go watch Kiran Bedi for Malashri's breathtaking stunts."

=== Box office ===
The film was rated as a hit at the box-office.
