= Gharshane =

2014 film by Dayal Padmanabhan

- Film poster
- Directed by: Dayal Padmanabhan
- Screenplay by: Dayal Padmanabhan
- Based on: Yuddham Sei (2011) by Mysskin
- Produced by: Shankar Gowda; Shankar Reddy; B. K. Mohan Kumar
- Starring: Malashri; Ayyappa P. Sharma; Ashish Vidyarthi
- Cinematography: Rajesh Kata
- Edited by: Sri (Crazy Mindz)
- Music by: S. N. Abhishek
- Production company: Shankar Productions
- Release date: 3 January 2014
- Running time: 131 minutes
- Country: India
- Language: Kannada

Gharshane is a 2014 Indian Kannada language action thriller film directed by Dayal Padmanabhan, and is a remake of the 2011 Tamil film Yuddham Sei. It stars Malashri, Ashish Vidyarthi and Ayyappa P. Sharma in the lead roles. The supporting cast features Roopika, Muni and Keerthiraj. Palaniraj received a nomination for Best Fight Choreographer at the 4th South Indian International Movie Awards.

== Cast ==
- Malashri as Nethravathi
- Ashish Vidyarthi
- Ayyappa P. Sharma as ACP Ganesh
- Roopika as Anjali
- Suchendra Prasad
- Pavitra Lokesh
- Muni as Sub-inspector Muniraju
- Gururaj Hoskote
- Sanketh Kashi
- Mico Nagaraj
- Nayana
- Vally Vamadapadav
- Keerthiraj
- Tarun Chandra in a cameo appearance

== Production ==
The film was Malashri's first outside her home banner in 14 years. The film's director Dayal Padmanabhan who also wrote the screenplay approached her to play the lead role of an investigative officer with the Central Crime Branch, Karnataka. Film director Ayyappa P. Sharma, who had formerly made cameo appearances in films, was signed to play the role of ACP Ganesh, a corrupt officer in the film. Film critic Shyam Prasad S. was roped in to pen the dialogues for the film.

=== Filming ===
Filming began in October 2012. Filming took place at various localities in Bangalore. The filming was completed in four schedules at various places. The song sequence for the track "Ring Aagide" was filmed at a specially erected set at Mysore Lamps Factory, in the Malleswaram suburb of Bangalore. The last sequence, of a fight was filmed in Bangalore in July 2013.

== Soundtrack ==
Gharshane

Soundtrack album by Manikanth Kadri
- Released: 25 December 2013
- Genre: Feature film soundtrack
- Length: 13:12
- Label: Anand Audio

Abhishek S. N. composed the film's background score, and the music for its soundtrack was composed by Manikanth Kadri. A remixed version of the track "Olage Seridare Gundu" was included in the album, the original of which featured in Malashri's 1989 film Nanjundi Kalyana. Lyrics for the remaining three tracks of the four-track album were penned by Abhishek S. N. and Shastry.

Track listing
| No. | Title | Lyrics | Music | Singer(s) | Length |
|---|---|---|---|---|---|
| 1. | "Olage Seridare" (Remix) | Bhangi Ranga | Upendra Kumar | Manjula Gururaj | 4:00 |
| 2. | "Ring Aagide" | Shastry | Manikanth Kadri | Priya Himesh, Naveen Madhav, Santhosh Venky, Sriraksha | 4:26 |
| 3. | "Gharshane" | S. N. Abhishek | Manikanth Kadri | Abhishek S. N. | 2:51 |
| 4. | "Hey Aakarshane" | S. N. Abhishek | Manikanth Kadri | Bharath B. J. | 1:55 |
| Total length: | | | | | 13:12 |

=== Critical reception ===
Kavya Christopher of The Times of India reviewed the album and gave it a 2.5/5 rating, and wrote, "The song [Olage Seridare], rendered by Manjula Gururaj retains the oomph of the original while aiming to top the charts in its remixed avatar." and concluded writing, "It's clearly a no frills attached album".

== Release and reception ==
The film was given the "U/A" (Parental guidance) certificate by the Regional Censor Board. Following this, 27 December 2013, was set as the tentative release date by the makers. However, it released theatrically on 3 January 2014.

Upon release, the film opened to mixed reviews from critics. The Times of India in its review rated the film three out of five and wrote, "With a neat script and narration, the director has done a good job of the story that keeps you gripped to the seat. While the first half is a bit confusing with too many characters, the second half compensates for it with neat narration." The performances of Malashri, Vidyarthi, Muni and Ayyappa were praised. Sridhar Vivan of Bangalore Mirror wrote, "The film scores on two things: gripping narration and a taut screenplay." However he felt that the song and fight sequences were "unnecessary" and "out of place". Sify.com in its review called the film "average" and wrote of Malashri's performance that she plays the "cop role to its perfection". The screenplay and narration of the film were also praised. However, the reviewer felt that stunts and song sequences were out of place. B. S. Srivani of Deccan Herald rated the film 2/5 and credited the film's cinematography and the acting performances, and criticized its music.
