= Mangalya Bandhana =

- VCD cover
- Directed by: S. K. Bhagavan
- Written by: Chi. Udayashankar (dialogues)
- Screenplay by: S. K. Bhagavan
- Story by: P. Vasu
- Based on: Purusha Lakshanam (1993)
- Produced by: S. K. Bhagavan
- Starring: Malashri; Ananth Nag; Moon Moon Sen
- Cinematography: J.G. Krishna
- Edited by: S. Manohar
- Music by: Hamsalekha
- Production company: Anupam Arts
- Release date: 31 December 1993
- Running time: 129 minutes
- Country: India
- Language: Kannada

Mangalya Bandhana is a 1993 Indian Kannada-language romantic drama film directed and produced by S. K. Bhagavan and written by P. Vasu. The film stars Ananth Nag, Malashri and Moon Moon Sen with Marthaanda, K. S. Ashwath and Ramesh Bhat in key supporting roles. The film's music was composed by Hamsalekha. The film was a remake of Tamil film Purusha Lakshanam (1993).

== Cast ==
- Anant Nag as Vijay
- Malashri as Geetha
- Moon Moon Sen as Rita
- Marthanda as Ashok
- K. S. Ashwath as Geetha's father
- Tennis Krishna as Gunjappa
- Ramesh Bhat
- Thimmaiah as lawyer
- Honnavalli Krishna as Chenna
- Shani Mahadevappa as Ramdas
- M. S. Umesh
- G. R. Bheema Rao
- Sridevi as Sharada
- Mynavathi as Vijay's mother
- Smitha
- Shanthamma
- Reshma
- Asha
- Uma
- Bhagyashree
- Anuradha
- Sarvamangala

== Soundtrack ==
The music of the film was composed and lyrics written by Hamsalekha.

Track listing
No.	Title	Lyrics	Singer(s)	Length
1.	"Sanjeyu Bandaithu"	Hamsalekha	Manjula Gururaj
2.	"Jeeva Nanna"	Hamsalekha	S. P. Balasubrahmanyam, K. S. Chithra
3.	"Bisilaadarenu"	Hamsalekha	S. P. Balasubrahmanyam, K. S. Chithra
4.	"Baalu Needalaagadavanu"	Hamsalekha	S. P. Balasubrahmanyam, K. S. Chithra
5.	"Nodu Nannomme"	Hamsalekha	Manjula Gururaj
6.	"Gaandhari"	Hamsalekha	Dr. Rajkumar
