= Gadibidi Aliya =

- DVD Cover
- Directed by: Om Sai Prakash
- Produced by: K. Raghava Rao
- Starring: Shiva Rajkumar; Malashri; Mohini; Jayamala
- Cinematography: Janilal
- Edited by: K. Narasaiah
- Music by: Koti
- Production company: Kalyani Enterprise
- Release date: July 4, 1995
- Running time: 149 minutes
- Country: India
- Language: Kannada

Gadibidi Aliya is a 1995 Indian Kannada-language comedy drama film, directed by Sai Prakash and produced by K. Raghava Rao. This film stars Shiva Rajkumar in a dual role, Malashri and Mohini whilst Jayamala and Srinath play other pivotal roles.

The original score and soundtrack was composed by Koti for the lyrics of R. N. Jayagopal. The film is a remake of Telugu film Allari Alludu (1993).

== Cast ==
- Shiva Rajkumar as Shivu and Raj in dual roles
- Malashri
- Mohini
- Jayamala
- Srinath
- M. N. Lakshmi Devi
- Tennis Krishna
- Doddanna
- Dubbing Janaki
- Ramesh Bhat
- Bank Janardhan
- Sathyabhama
- Manju Malini
- Rajesh
- Bank Suresh
- Narasimha Murthy
- M. S. Karanth
- Ananthrao Maccheri
- Agro Chikkanna
- Mysore Ramanand
- Adugodi Srinivas
- Bharath Kumar
- Honnavalli Krishna

== Soundtrack ==
Soundtrack was composed by Raj-Koti. The song "Umma Beku Sai" was remade from Raj-Koti's own composition "Bavalu Sayya" they composed for Telugu film Bava Bavamaridi. Raj-Koti later adapted "Jama Jama Jamaisi" as "Daayi Daayi" for Telugu film Raja Simham.

#	Title	Singer(s)	Lyrics
1	"Jama Jama Jamaisi"	S. P. Balasubrahmanyam, K. S. Chithra	R. N. Jayagopal
2	"Ladyige Jentle Manu"	S. P. Balasubrahmanyam, K. S. Chithra	R. N. Jayagopal
3	"Havana Havana"	S. P. Balasubrahmanyam	R. N. Jayagopal
4	"Umma Beku Sai"	Rajesh Krishnan, Manjula Gururaj, Sangeetha Katti	R. N. Jayagopal
5	"Rama Rasave"	S. P. Balasubrahmanyam, Manjula Gururaj	R. N. Jayagopal
6	"Kannadada Kuvara"	Rajkumar, Rajesh Krishnan	R. N. Jayagopal
