= Gulama =

- movie poster
- Directed by: Tushar Ranganath
- Written by: Tushar Ranganath
- Screenplay by: Tushar Ranganath
- Produced by: Ramu
- Starring: Prajwal Devaraj; Bianca Desai; Sonu
- Cinematography: KM Vishnuvardhan; Shekhar Chandra
- Edited by: Deepu S Kumar
- Music by: Gurukiran
- Distributed by: Ramu Enterprises
- Release date: 1 January 2009
- Country: India
- Language: Kannada

Gulama (transl. Bondsman) is a 2009 Kannada-language film directed by Tushar Ranganath and produced by Ramu. The film stars Prajwal Devraj, Bianca Desai, and Sonu in the lead roles. Music was composed by Gurukiran. The film released statewide on 1 January 2009.

== Synopsis ==
The film is about a love triangle: Anil loves Priyanka, and Divya loves Anil.

== Cast ==
- Prajwal Devaraj as Anil
- Bianca Desai as Priyanka
- Sonu as Divya
- Rangayana Raghu as Police Constable Nanjundaswamy, Anil's father
- Avinash as Police Commissioner Vijay Kumar Singh
- Lakshman Rao
- Ganesh Rao Kesarkar
- Sudha Belawadi as Vanajakshi, Anil's mother
- Shailaja Joshi
- M. N. Lakshmi Devi
- Kaddipudi Chandru as Babloo Chandra
- Malavalli Saikrishna
- Vishwa Kaddi as Pagal Seena
- Sanketh Kashi
- N. Vinod Kumar
- Yogi G. Raj
- Kung-fu Chandru
- Maafi Gowda as himself
- Raghu Samrat
- K. V. Manjayya
- Malathi Sardeshpande
- Mallesh Mysore

== Soundtrack ==
Gulama

Film score by Gurukiran
- Genre: Film score
- Language: Kannada
- Label: Anand Audio
- Producer: Ramu

The film has five songs composed by Gurukiran, with the lyrics primarily penned by Tushar Ranganath and Kaviraj.

No.	Title	Lyrics	Singers	Length
1.	"Shakala Shakala Umma"	Tushar Ranganath	Gurukiran, Sunitha
2.	"Snehitane Snehitane"	Tushar Ranganath	Srinivas, K. S. Chithra
3.	"Ishte Ishtu Iruva Hrudaya"	Tushar Ranganath	Madhu Balakrishnan
4.	"Taare Annutaare"	Kaviraj	Sunidhi Chauhan
5.	"Chandalana Kaili"	Tushar Ranganath	Gururaj Hoskote, Murali Mohan, Gurukiran

== Reception ==
=== Critical response ===
R G Vijayasarathy of Rediff.com scored the film at 2 out of 5 stars and says "Guru Kiran does not make any impact with his music compositions. Vishnuvardhan's cinematography and Danny's fights choreography are better handled. Gulama may impress the mass audience to some extent, but it is not meant for the family audience." Bangalore Mirror wrote "The background music could have ensured that flashbacks and current narratives are differentiated, but it does not.For the record, the film is dedicated to Vinod Kumar, the aspiring actor shot dead by producer Govardhan Murthy last year." Manjju Shettar of Mid-Day scored the film at 2 out of 5 stars and says "Prajwal and Biyanka are matured in their acting and Sonu will attract the audience. Rangayana Raghu and other actors have done well with their performances. Film's settings are highly rich but choreography has failed. Cameraman K M Vishnuvardan has done a good job with creativity."
