= Malashri =

Indian actress

- Born: Sri Durga; Madras, Tamil Nadu, India
- Other name: Malashree
- Occupation: Actress
- Years active: 1977–present
- Spouse: Ramu (m. 1997; died 2021)
- Children: 2, including Aradhana
- Relatives: Subhashri (sister)

Malashree (born Sridurga Pandey) is an Indian actress who works predominantly in Kannada cinema besides also having sporadically appeared in Telugu and Tamil language films. "She has appeared in 100 and more films in a career spanning three decades." . She began her career as a child artiste and starred in the 1979 Tamil film Imayam. She made her debut as an adult in the 1989 Kannada-language film Nanjundi Kalyana. In the following years, she established herself as one of Kannada cinema's top heroines. She had been called, by the media and fans, "Kanasina Rani" (Queen of dreams). She is popular for playing diverse roles in women-centric movies many of which were highly successful at the box-office.

Her debut film Nanjundi Kalyana with Raghavendra Rajkumar was a major box office success, which was her breakthrough. Throughout the '90s, she starred in several successful films like: Gajapathi Garvabhanga (1989), Policena Hendthi (1990), Kitturina Huli (1990), Rani Maharani (1990), Mruthyunjaya (1990), Hrudaya Haadithu (1991), Ramachaari (1991), Belli Kalungura (1992), Solillada Saradara (1993) and Gadibidi Aliya (1995), establishing herself as one of the top heroines of the Kannada film industry. In 1992, she starred in 19 films, breaking the 24-year-old record of highest releases in Kannada in a lead role in a single year, held by Dr. Rajkumar. She won the Filmfare Award for Best Actress in 1991 for her performance as a young woman inflicted with an incurable heart disease in the movie Hrudaya Haadithu. In 2015, she won her first Karnataka State Film Award for Best Actress for her action-oriented role in Ganga.

== Personal life ==
Malashri was born and brought up in Madras (now known as Chennai) to a Telugu mother, Chandralekha, and a Punjabi father, Pandey. She was named Sridurga at birth. She shot to fame with Nanjundi Kalyana in 1989 but her personal life hit an all-time low the same year when her step mother and grandmother died in a road accident. She was in a relationship with actor Sunil, her co-star of many films. But in 1994 they met with a car accident and while Malashree suffered multiple injuries, Sunil died on the spot. It was rumoured that they had been planning to get married. She was married to film producer Ramu in 1997 and they had a daughter and son together, Ananya (b. 2001; later renamed Radhana) and Arjun. Her sister Subhashri was also an actress, who appeared in South Indian films. Her husband Ramu died on 26 April 2021 due to COVID-19.

== Career ==
=== Child artist ===
Malashri began her career as a child artiste and appeared in 35 films in Tamil and Telugu and she played the role of a boy in 26 of them. In a talk show, Majaa Talkies, she said that as a child, she was a fan of actor Amitabh Bachchan and would dress up like him, which prompted directors to cast her as a boy, in 1979 films like Imayam and Neela Malargal.

=== Lead roles ===
Writer and lyricist Chi. Udaya Shankar introduced Malashri to the Rajkumar family when they were on the lookout for a fresh face opposite their son Raghavendra Rajkumar who was gearing up to make his debut. Parvathamma Rajkumar decided to cast her in Nanjundi Kalyana (1989) for her production banner, Vajreshwari Combines and rechristened her Malashri. Malashri went on to act in two other films with Vajreshwari Combines, Gajapathi Garvabhanga opposite Raghavendra again, and Mruthyunjaya with Shiva Rajkumar. Between the years 1989–1991, she starred in around 50 films, out of which 35 films hits and 15 were average grosses, making her the heroine with the highest hit percentage in the Kannada film industry.

In 1990 Malashri took on the famous double role in Rani Maharani (immortalized by Sridevi in ChaalBaaz) and won a huge fan following with her powerhouse performance. Her next film Hrudaya Haadithu where she played a young woman inflicted with a heart problem won her acclaim from the masses and critics alike as well as the Filmfare Best Actress award for 1991. As she churned out hit after hit even the stalwart V. Ravichandran, who till then believed only in importing heroines from other states, cashed in on her popularity by casting her in Ramachaari (a remake of Tamil Hit Chinna Thambi). The move paid off, enabling him to come out of the financial crisis he faced due to the debacle of Shanti Kranti.

In the later part of the 90s, Malashri had a string of less successful films like Prema Khaidi, Snehada Kadalalli, Megha Mandara, Arishina Kumkuma, and Solillada Saradara. She took brief hiatus after marriage and made a comeback in the new millennium with "angry woman" roles in Chamundi (2000), Durgi (2004), Kannadada Kiran Bedi (2009), Shakti (2012), Veera (2013) and Ganga (2015).

== Filmography ==
=== Kannada films ===
Year	Film	Role	Notes
1989	Nanjundi Kalyana	Devi	
1989	Gajapathi Garvabhanga	Sowmya	
1990	Policena Hendthi	Vanaja	
1990	Mruthyunjaya	Shylaja	
1990	Raja Kempu Roja	Geetha	
1990	Rani Maharani	Suma / Rani	Dual roles
1990	Prathap	Rani	
1991	Hrudaya Haadithu	Asha	Filmfare Award for Best Actress
1991	Kitturina Huli	Bharathi	
1991	Thavarumane Udugore	Lakshmi	
1991	Readymade Ganda	Lakshmi	
1991	S. P. Bhargavi	Bhargavi	
1991	Ramachaari	Nandini	
1991	Gandu Sidigundu	Jyothi	
1991	Rowdy & MLA	Gowri	
1991	Halli Rambhe Belli Bombe	Asha	
1991	Gruha Pravesha	Jyothi	
1991	Kollur Kala	Kanaka	
1991	Mangalya	Savithri	
1992	Belli Kalungura	Bhadra	Record for highest number of releases in Kannada filmdom in a single year (20 films)
1992	Hatamari Hennu Kiladi Gandu	Sharadha	Record for highest number of releases in Kannada filmdom in a single year (20 films)
1992	Shivanaga	Nagamma	Record for highest number of releases in Kannada filmdom in a single year (20 films)
1992	Belli Modagalu	Seetha	Record for highest number of releases in Kannada filmdom in a single year (20 films)
1992	Sindhoora Thilaka	Kaveri	Record for highest number of releases in Kannada filmdom in a single year (20 films)
1992	Vajrayudha	Padmini	Record for highest number of releases in Kannada filmdom in a single year (20 films)
1992	Malashree Mamashree	Malashri	Record for highest number of releases in Kannada filmdom in a single year (20 films)
1992	Solillada Saradara	Radha	Record for highest number of releases in Kannada filmdom in a single year (20 films)
1992	Nagaradalli Nayakaru	Maya	Record for highest number of releases in Kannada filmdom in a single year (20 films)
1992	Kanasina Rani	Prabhavati	Record for highest number of releases in Kannada filmdom in a single year (20 films)
1992	Sahasi	Geetha	Record for highest number of releases in Kannada filmdom in a single year (20 films)
1992	Prema Sangama	Preethi	Record for highest number of releases in Kannada filmdom in a single year (20 films)
1992	Megha Mandara	Mandara	Record for highest number of releases in Kannada filmdom in a single year (20 films)
1992	Gruhalakshmi	Mangala	Record for highest number of releases in Kannada filmdom in a single year (20 films)
1992	Halli Krishna Delhi Radha	Radha	Record for highest number of releases in Kannada filmdom in a single year (20 films)
1992	Snehada Kadalalli	Ganga	Record for highest number of releases in Kannada filmdom in a single year (20 films)
1992	Mana Mecchida Sose	Sandhya	Record for highest number of releases in Kannada filmdom in a single year (20 films)
1992	Marana Mrudanga	Lavanya Devi	Record for highest number of releases in Kannada filmdom in a single year (20 films)
1992	Belliyappa Bangarappa	Special appearance	Record for highest number of releases in Kannada filmdom in a single year (20 films)
1992	Kaliyuga Seethe	Seetha	Record for highest number of releases in Kannada filmdom in a single year (20 films)
1993	Hendthi Helidare Kelabeku	Mala	
1993	Mangalya Bandhana	Geetha	
1993	Kalyana Rekhe	Sunitha	
1993	Navibbaru Namagibbaru	Kanchana	
1995	Mutthinantha Hendathi	Gowri	
1995	Gadibidi Aliya	Mala	
1995	Giddu Dada	Sandhya	
1995	Lady Police	DCP Priyanka	
1995	Putmalli	Putmalli	
1995	Hello Sister	Mala	
1996	Circle Inspector	Arundhathi	
1996	Arishina Kunkuma	Susheela	
1996	Nirnaya	Herself	Special appearance
1997	Ganga Yamuna	Ganga	
1997	C.B.I. Durga	Durga	
1997	Lady Commissioner	Kiran	
1997	Akka	Asha	
1997	Zindabad	Ashwini	
1998	Lady Tiger	Inspector Tejaswini	
1998	Agni Sakshi	Pallavi	
1998	Goonda Matthu Police	ACP Bhavani	
1998	Tiger Padmini	Padmini	
2000	Chamundi	Chamundi	
2001	Bhavani IPS	Bhavani	
2004	Durgi	Durgi	
2009	Kannadada Kiran Bedi	Kiran Bedi / Bellary Bhagyalakshmi	
2012	Shakti	Shakti / Chamundi	
2013	Veera	Veeralakshmi	
2013	Election	Indira	
2014	Gharshane	Nethravathi	
2015	Mahakali	Devi	
2015	Ganga	Ganga	Karnataka State Film Award for Best Actress
2016	John Jani Janardhan	Policewoman	Special appearance
2017	Uppu Huli Khara	Policewoman	
2023	Marakastra	Janhavi	
2024	Night Curfew	Durga	
2025	Maadeva		Extended cameo appearance
2025	Pendrive	Chamundi	
2026	Majestic 2		
2026	Kendada Seragu	Pavitra	
2026	Calendar	Health Minister	
2027	Mangala Gowri †	Mangala	Filming

=== Telugu films ===
Year	Film	Role	Notes
1977	Gadasu Ammayi	Tuition student	Credited as Baby Durga
1979	Yugandhar	Ram Singh's daughter	Credited as Baby Durga
1980	Superman	Raja's sister	Credited as Baby Durga
1980	Mama Allulla Saval	Papayya's daughter/Madhu's sister	Credited as Baby Durga
1986	Ide Naa Samadhanam		Credited as Durga
1987	Ramu	Jalaja	
1988	Chinababu	Poorna	
1988	Ramudu Bheemudu	Surpanaka	
1988	Varasudochadu	Bujji	
1988	Donga Ramudu	Durga	
1989	Chinnari Sneham		
1990	Prema Khaidi	Neelima	Nominated—Filmfare Award for Best Actress – Telugu
1993	Paruvu Prathistha		
1993	Akka Chellelu		
1993	Urmila		
1993	Bava Bavamaridi	Geeta	
1994	Police Alludu		
1994	Allari Police	Kasturi	
1994	Bhale Maavayya		
1994	Bangaru Mogudu		
1994	Gharana Alludu	Padmavathi	
1994	Thodi Kodallu		
1996	Sahasa Veerudu Sagara Kanya	Ganga	
1997	Surya Putrulu		

=== Tamil films ===
Year	Film	Role	Notes
1979	Imayam	Jamuna	Credited as Baby Durga
1979	Neela Malargal	Master Kannan	
1986	Manakanakku	An actress	
1989	Chinna Chinna Aasaigal		Credited as Rasika
1990	Aatha Naan Pass Ayittaen		

== Awards ==
Karnataka State Film Awards

- 2015 : Karnataka State Film Award for Best Actress : Ganga

Filmfare Awards South

- 1991: Filmfare Award for Best Actress: Hrudaya Haadithu
- 1993 : Cinema Express Award for Best Actress : Mangalya Bandhana

Other awards

1990 - Nandi Award for best Supporting Actress - Prema Khaidi

- 2011: NTR Award
- 2016: Santosham Award for Completing 25 Years in Cinema at 14th Santosham Film Awards
