= Nanjundi =

2003 Kannada film directed by S. R. Brothers

- VCD cover
- Directed by: S. R. Brothers
- Written by: S. R. Brothers
- Produced by: Ramu
- Starring: Shiva Rajkumar; Debina Bonnerjee; Umashri; Lokesh
- Cinematography: B. Suresh Babu
- Edited by: Jo Ni Harsha
- Music by: Hamsalekha
- Production company: Ramu Enterprises
- Release date: 22 August 2003
- Running time: 155 minutes
- Country: India
- Language: Kannada

Nanjundi is a 2003 Indian Kannada-language drama film directed and written by S. R. Brothers and produced by Ramu. The film stars Shiva Rajkumar and Debina Bonnerjee in her Kannada debut along with Umashri and Lokesh in other pivotal roles. The film's highlight was the exclusive shot of the famous Kambala race that happens along the coastal region of Karnataka.

The film featured original score and soundtrack composed and written by Hamsalekha which marked his 250th film work. A R Aravmundan won Karnataka State Film Award for Best Sound Recording award for the year 2003–04.

== Cast ==
- Shiva Rajkumar as Nanjundi
- Debina Bonnerjee as Soundarya
- Umashree as Janavva
- Lokesh
- Suresh Heblikar
- M. N. Lakshmi Devi
- Chitra Shenoy as Soundarya's mother
- Shobha Raghavendra
- Doddanna as Doddanna
- Sadashiva Brahmavar as priest
- Srinivasa Prabhu as Soundarya's father
- Karibasavaiah
- Vaijanath Biradar as Narsa
- Venkat Rao as Lakshmi's father
- Sadhu Kokila
- M. P. Shankar as sarpanch
- M. S. Karanth as doctor
- K. V. Manjayya as doctor
- Karthik Sharma (credited as Master Karthik)

== Soundtrack ==
The music was composed by Hamsalekha scoring for his 250th film. Veteran singers like S. Janaki, K. J. Yesudas, S. P. Balasubrahmanyam among others have sung for the songs as a mark to their long association with the composer. The soundtrack is said to be purely associated with traditional musical instruments without any usage of the modern electronic instruments.

Track listing
No.	Title	Lyrics	Singer(s)	Length
1.	"Kayuthalanno Namma"	Hamsalekha	S. P. Balasubrahmanyam
2.	"Nanjundi Haadu"	Hamsalekha	S. Janaki
3.	"Andada Maneya"	Hamsalekha	Madhu Balakrishnan
4.	"Thayi Endalli Januma Ide"	Hamsalekha	K. J. Yesudas
5.	"Koli Ko Koli"	Hamsalekha	Rajesh Krishnan
6.	"Deepadinda Deepava"	Hamsalekha	Madhu Balakrishnan, Nanditha
7.	"Baaro Maleraya"	Hamsalekha	Madhu Balakrishnan
8.	"Chellidaro Malligeya"	Hamsalekha	Chetan Sosca, Nanditha

== Reception ==
A critic from Chitraloka wrote that "Like how a best story is not written it is always re written, this film needed some sharp scissors and proper outlook is missing". India Info wrote "Good music, tight screen play, excellent cinematography makes NANJUNDI a winner".
