= Shakti (2012 film) =

- Film poster
- Directed by: Anil Kumar
- Screenplay by: Anil Kumar
- Story by: Ramu Enterprises
- Produced by: Ramu
- Starring: Malashri; Hema Chaudhary; P. Ravi Shankar; Sadhu Kokila; Sayaji Shinde; Ashish Vidyarthi
- Cinematography: Rajesh Kata
- Edited by: Lakshman Reddy (Picture House)
- Music by: Vardhan
- Production company: Ramu Enterprises
- Distributed by: Ramu Films
- Release date: 6 January 2012
- Running time: 144 minutes
- Country: India
- Language: Kannada

Shakti (Kannada: ಶಕ್ತಿ) is a 2012 action Kannada film directed by Anil Kumar starring Malashri, Hema Choudhary and P. Ravi Shankar. This is Ramu Enterprises 32nd film produced by Ramu. The film was released across Karnataka on 6 January 2012.

== Cast ==
- Malashri as Shakti / Chamundi
- Hema Choudhary as Rudramma
- Sayaji Shinde as Bacchegowda
- P. Ravi Shankar as Huchchegowda
- Ashish Vidyarthi as Police officer
- Sharath Lohitashwa as Bettappa
- Avinash
- Sadhu Kokila as Thrill Deena
- Vinaya Prasad
- Kiran Srinivas as Vijay
- Radhika Gandhi as Gayathri
- Ashalatha
- Kuri Prathap
- H. M. T. Nandha
- Shashikala
- Ne.La.Narendra Babu
- Suresh Mangalore
- Mimicry Gopi
- Shankar Bhat
- Soujanya DV
- Mamatha Ravuth
- Ashwath Narayan
- Stunt Siddu
- Fayaz Khan
- Suryanarayana waali
- Lakshman Rao

== Production ==
The film production went on floors in July 2011. This marks actress Malashri's 8th film with her husband's home banner. Malashri plays tough cop fighting against corruption. Anil Kumar, who was introduced as a script writer makes his debut at the direction and also scripts the screenplay along with dialogues. The film is expected to release in the first week of January 2012. One of the highlights of the film is the association of 5 stunt directors namely Thriller Manju, Ravi Varma, Ram Lakshman, Palani Raj and Mass Mada.

== Soundtrack ==
Shakti

Soundtrack album by Vardhan
- Released: 5 January 2012
- Genre: Feature film soundtrack
- Length: 4:36
- Label: Alpha Digitech

K. Kalyan has written lyrics for the lone song composed by Vardhan in this film. The song "Bandiyu Saguthide" is sung by veteran actor Shivarajkumar. Akash Audio holds the audio recording rights. Vardhan composed the film's soundtrack for the album consisting of three tracks. The track "Bandi Saaguthide" was sung by actor Shiva Rajkumar, with lyrics written by K. Kalyan.

Track list
No.	Title	Lyrics	Singer(s)	Length
1.	"Bandi Saguthide"	K. Kalyan	Shiva Rajkumar	3:15
2.	"Naale Emba" (female vocals)		Malashri	0:41
3.	"Naale Emba" (male vocals)		Vardhan	0:40
Total length:				4:36

== Reception ==
=== Critical response ===
A critic from The New Indian Express wrote "Cinematographers Sudhakar and Rajesh have done a neat job behind the camera. Their contribution in picturising the action sequences is immense". BSS from Deccan Herald wrote "Hardcore Malashree fans will be heartened to see their “Gundina Hudugi” revelling in what she does best. Ditto anger management ‘experts’. But there is little else to appreciate". A critic from News18 India wrote "An experienced director would have been able to make 'Shakti' work at least in B and C Centres. 'Shakti' has absolutely nothing to offer to movie lovers". A critic from Bangalore Mirror wrote "Too much of a good thing is boring. There is no relief with the dialogues either. Maybe the debutant filmmaker thinks the audience is not intelligent enough to understand the progression of a story without dialogues".

== Awards ==
Ceremony	Category	Nominee	Result
2nd South Indian International Movie Awards	Best Actor in a Negative Role	P. Ravi Shankar	Nominated
