= Tennis Krishna =

Indian actor

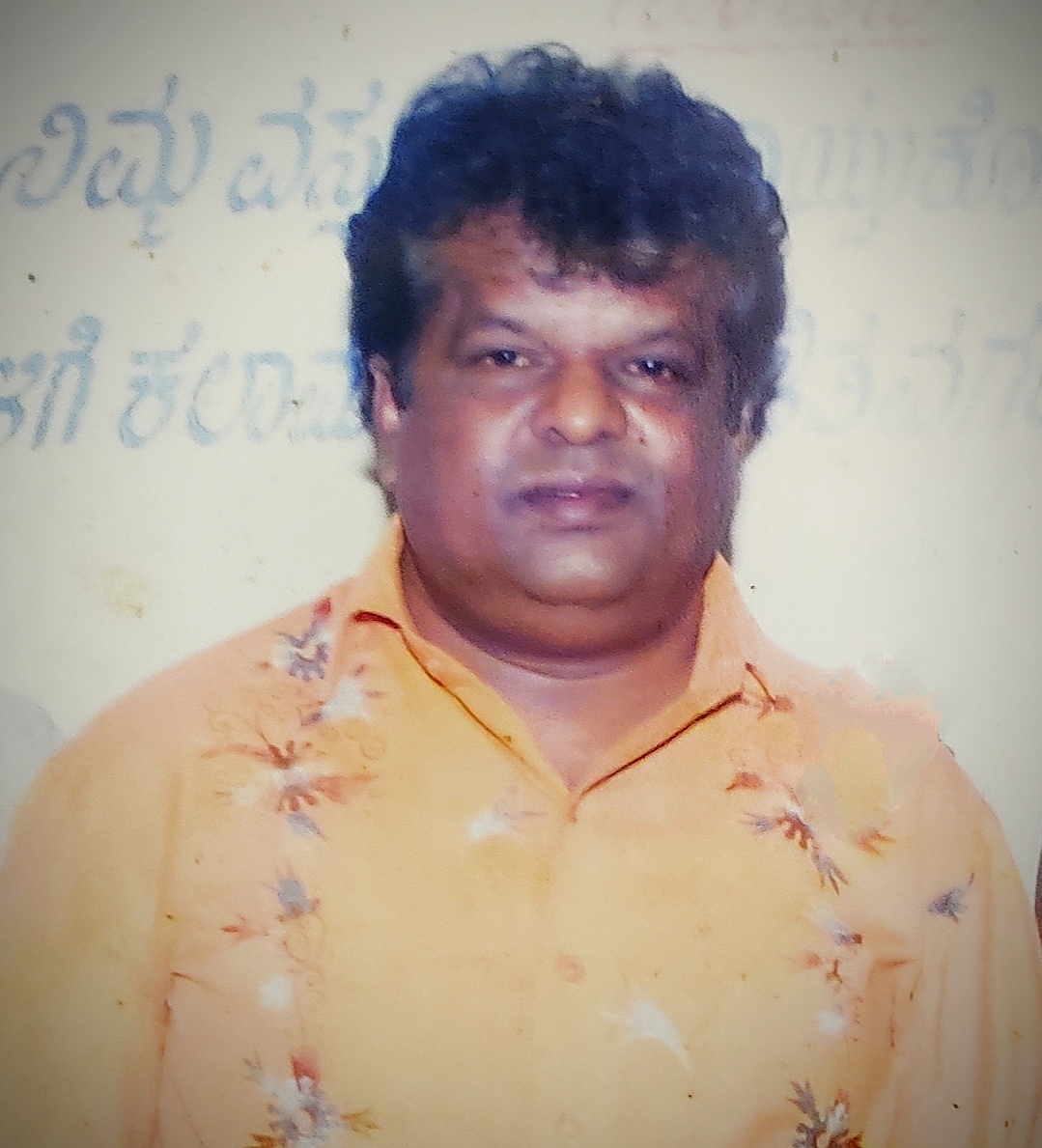
- Born: 5 June 1961 (age 64); Bengaluru
- Occupation: Actor
- Years active: 1990–present

Tennis Krishna is an Indian actor known for his works in Kannada films as a comedian. He has acted in over 600 movies and has a record of appearing in 100 movies with comedy actress Rekha Das.

== Life ==
His background is from Kannada theatre. Since Krishna was a common name in the film industry, he got the moniker Tennis Krishna to differentiate himself since he used to be a tennis coach.

He acted with Kannada actor Dr. Rajkumar in the movie Jeevanachaitra. His first released Kannada, in a lead role for the first film was Appa Nanjappa Maga Gunjappa in 1994. After the success of Appa Nanjappa Maga Gunajappa, Tennis Krishna acted in many more films mainly in comedy roles including Bannada Neralu and Ond Chance Kodi.

== Partial filmography ==
=== As actor ===
Year	Film	Role	Notes
1990	Raja Kempu Roja		
1992	Jeevana Chaitra	Putta Jois	
1992	Undu Hoda Kondu Hoda	Kamangi	
1992	Tharle Nan Maga		
1992	Chikkejamanru		
1992	Bombat Hendthi	Krishna	
1992	Kaliyuga Seethe		
1993	Mangalya Bandhana		
1993	Anuragada Alegalu		
1994	Appa Nanjappa Maga Gunjappa		Lead role
1995	Gadibidi Aliya		
1995	Mojugara Sogasugara		
1996	Dhani		
1997	Ee Hrudaya Ninagaagi		
1997	Cheluva		
1998	Hello Yama		
1998	Kowrava		
1998	Thutta Mutta		
1998	Preethsod Thappa	Tennis	
1999	Jayasoorya		
1999	Nannaseya Hoove		
1999	Patela		
1999	Meese Hotta Gandasige Demandappu Demandu		
2000	Kiladi		
2000	Soorappa		
2000	Nan Hendthi Chennagidale	Passerby	Cameo appearance
2000	Yajamana	Krishna	
2001	Diggajaru		
2001	Yaarige Beda Duddu		
2002	Neela Megha Shyama		
2002	Makeup		
2002	Thuntata	Thimma	
2002	Olu Saar Bari Olu		
2003	Shri Kalikamba		
2003	Gokarna		
2004	Durgi		
2005	Maharaja		
2005	Anna Thangi		
2005	News		
2005	Sirichandana		
2006	Nidhi		
2006	Hettavara Kanasu		
2006	Road Romeo		
2007	Parodi		
2007	Lava Kusha		
2008	Mast Maja Maadi		
2009	Veera Madakari	Hosdoddi	
2009	Chickpete Sachagalu	Mic Madesha	
2010	Idre Gopi Bidre Papi		
2010	Onti Mane		
2011	5 Idiots		
2011	Uyyale		
2011	Gavipura		
2011	Kaanchaana		
2011	Putra		
2011	Taare		
2011	Namitha I Love You		
2011	Sri Naga Shakthi		
2012	Hara		
2012	Bhagavantha Kai Kotta		
2012	Navika		
2013	Bulbul		
2013	Pyarge Aagbittaite		
2014	Ekka Saka		Tulu film
2015	Ond Chance Kodi		
2015	Uppi 2		
2015	Bangalore 560023		
2016	Ilamai Oonjal	Paramasivan	Tamil film; uncredited
2016	John Jani Janardhan		
2017	Preethi Prema		

=== As singer ===
- 2002 - Yaarige Beda Duddu!
- 2002 - Neela Megha Shyama
- 2009 - Veera Madakari

==== Television ====
- 2018 - Comedy Khiladi Championship - Zee Kannada
