= List of Kannada films of 1992 =

== Top-grossing films ==
| Rank | Title | Collection | Ref. |
|---|---|---|---|
| 1. | Jeevana Chaitra | ₹9 crore (₹73.84 crore in 2025) | |
| 2. | Halli Meshtru | ₹5 crore (₹41.02 crore in 2025) | |
| 3. | Aatma Bandhana | ₹4 crore (₹32.87 crore in 2025) | |
| 4. | Belliyappa Bangarappa | ₹3 crore (₹24.61 crore in 2025) | |
| 5. | Tharle Nan Maga | ₹2 crore (₹16.44 crore in 2025) | |

== List ==
The following is a list of films produced in the Kannada film industry in India in 1992, presented in alphabetical order.

| Title | Director | Cast | Music | Reference |
|---|---|---|---|---|
| Aathma Bandhana | Srikanth Nahata | Shashikumar, Jayapradha, Vaishnavi | Rajan–Nagendra | |
| Adjustment | Rajavardhan | Jai Jagadish, Sundar Krishna Urs, Rekha Das, Ramanna | Manoranjan Prabhakar | |
| Agni Panjara | Srinivasa Reddy | Devaraj, Vinaya Prasad | Hamsalekha | |
| Alli Ramachari Illi Brahmachari | B Ramamurthy | Jaggesh, Swathi Ganguli, Prathibha, Abhijeeth | V. Manohar | |
| Amara Prema | Om Sai Prakash | Kumar Bangarappa, Chandrika, Shivaranjini | Upendra Kumar | |
| Athi Madhura Anuraga | P. H. Vishwanath | Kashinath, Panchami, Vatsala | Hamsalekha | |
| Baa Nanna Preethisu | Siddalingaiah | Shashikumar, Soundarya, Madhuri | Rajan–Nagendra | |
| Banni Ondsala Nodi | S. Umesh | Vinod Raj, Shruti, Tara, Triveni, Dheerendra Gopal | Upendra Kumar | |
| Belli Kalungura | K. V. Raju | Sunil, Malashri, Tara, Doddanna | Hamsalekha | |
| Belli Modagalu | K. V. Raju | Ramesh Aravind, Malashri, Doddanna, Jayanthi | Upendra Kumar | |
| Belliyappa Bangarappa | Poorna Pragna | Kumar Bangarappa, Amala, Malashri, Master Anand, Vishnuvardhan, Shiva Rajkumar, Sudharani | S. P. Balasubrahmanyam | |
| Bhanda Nanna Ganda | Raj Kishor | Jaggesh, Priyanka, Ambareesh | V. Manohar | |
| Bharjari Gandu | Renuka Sharma | Raghavendra Rajkumar, Roopashree, Srinath, Lokesh | Upendra Kumar | |
| Bombat Hendthi | P. N. Ramachandra Rao | Sridhar, Ramesh Bhat, Shruti, Tennis Krishna, Sihi Kahi Chandru | Upendra Kumar | |
| Chaitrada Premanjali | S. Narayan | Raghuveer, Shwetha, Lokesh, Abhijeeth | Hamsalekha | |
| Chikkejamanru | Om Sai Prakash | V. Ravichandran, Gouthami, Jai Jagadish | Hamsalekha | |
| Chitralekha | V. Somashekar | Devaraj, Shruti, Doddanna, Ramesh Bhat | Hamsalekha | |
| Edurmaneli Ganda Pakkadmaneli Hendthi | Relangi Narasimha Rao | Shashikumar, Shruthi, Mukhyamantri Chandru, Umashree | Raj–Koti | |
| Entede Bhanta | D. Rajendra Babu | Ambareesh, Rajani, Vanitha Vasu, Vajramuni | Hamsalekha | |
| Gandharva | Ramnath Rugvedi, H S Rajashekar | Shashikumar, Brinda, Soundarya, Ramesh Bhat | Hamsalekha | |
| Ganesha Subramanya | Phani Ramachandra | Ananth Nag, Ramesh Bhat, Mukhyamantri Chandru, Anjali, Hema Chaudhary, Vaishali Kasaravalli | V. Manohar | |
| Gharshane | Om Sai Prakash | Devaraj, Shashikumar, Vanitha Vasu, Anitha | Upendra Kumar | |
| Gili Bete | Vemgal Jagannath Rao | Vinod Raj, Sadhana, Tara | Manoranjan Prabhakar | |
| Goonda Rajya | Vijay | Devaraj, Vinaya Prasad, Avinash, R. N. Sudarshan | Upendra Kumar | |
| Gopi Krishna | V. Ravichandran | V. Ravichandran, Rupini, Sumithra | Hamsalekha | |
| Gruhalakshmi | B. Subba Rao | Sridhar, Srinath, Malashri, Lakshmi, Jayanthi | Raj–Koti | |
| Guru Brahma | Veerappa | V. Ravichandran, Sukanya, Lokesh, Ramakrishna | Hamsalekha | |
| Halli Krishna Delhi Radha | P V Raju | Sunil, Malashri, K. S. Ashwath, Vajramuni | Rajan-Nagendra | |
| Halli Meshtru | Mohan - Manju | V. Ravichandran, Bindiya, Tara, Silk Smitha, Balakrishna | Hamsalekha | |
| Harakeya Kuri | K. S. L. Swamy | Vishnuvardhan, Geetha, Prakash Rai | Vijaya Bhaskar | |
| Hatamari Hennu Kiladi Gandu | Renuka Sharma | Sridhar, Malashri, Anjana, Jaggesh | Rajan–Nagendra | |
| Hendtheere Hushar | Om Sai Prakash | Shashikumar, Sowmyashree, Mukhyamantri Chandru | Upendra Kumar | |
| Hosa Kalla Hale Kulla | Dwarakish | Shashikumar, Dwarakish, Madhumathi, Silk Smitha | Hamsalekha | |
| Jeevana Chaitra | Dorai–Bhagavan | Rajkumar, Madhavi, Sudharani, Balaraj, Abhijeeth, Chi Guru Dutt | Upendra Kumar | |
| Jhenkara | Raghuram | Ananth Nag, Kumar Bangarappa, Priyanka, Geetha, Jayanthi | Hamsalekha | |
| Kaliyuga Seethe | Vijay | Sunil, Malashri, Srinivasa Murthy, Avinash | Rajan–Nagendra | |
| Kanasina Rani | M. S. Rajashekar | Shashikumar, Malashri, Jaggesh, Ananth Nag | Upendra Kumar | |
| Kranthi Gandhi | N. T. Jayarama Reddy | Sridhar, Shivaranjini, K. S. Ashwath, Doddanna | Guna Singh | |
| Kempu Nishane | Ravi Raj | Ambareesh, Navaneetha | Raja Shekar | |
| Ksheera Sagara | Singeetam Srinivasa Rao | Kumar Bangarappa, Amala, Shruti, C. R. Simha, Lokesh | Hamsalekha | |
| Kubi Matthu Iyala | Sadananda Suvarna | Charuhasan, Raghubir Yadav, Lalithanjali, Vaishali Kasaravalli | L. Vaidyanathan | |
| Malashree Mamashree | Om Sai Prakash | Sunil, Balaraj, Malashri, Tara, Mukhyamantri Chandru | Raj–Koti | |
| Mallige Hoove | Raj Kishor | Ambareesh, Shashikumar, Rupini, Priyanka | Hamsalekha | |
| Mana Mecchida Sose | B. Ramamurthy | Sunil, Malashri, Abhijeeth, Dheerendra Gopal | Upendra Kumar | |
| Mannina Doni | M. S. Rajashekar | Ambareesh, Sudha Rani, Vanitha Vasu, Chi Guru Dutt, Umashree | Hamsalekha | |
| Marana Mrudanga | B Ramamurthy | Thiagarajan, Malashri, Ramakrishna Hegde, Sunil, Ananth Nag | Hamsalekha | |
| Mavanige Thakka Aliya | V. Govindraj | Shivarajkumar, Lokesh, M. S. Umesh | Shankar–Ganesh | |
| Megha Mandara | K. V. Jayaram | Ambareesh, Malashri, Anjana, Jaggesh, K. S. Ashwath | S. P. Venkatesh | |
| Midida Shruthi | M. S. Rajashekar | Shivarajkumar, Sudharani, Vinaya Prasad, Srinath | Upendra Kumar | |
| Mysore Jaana | A. T. Raghu | Ambareesh, Vinaya Prasad, Anjana | Rajan–Nagendra | |
| Nagaradalli Nayakaru | Om Sai Prakash | Malashri, Sunil, Balaraj, Chi. Guru Dutt, Tara | Raj–Koti | |
| Nanjunda | S. Narayan | Vinod Raj, Sumathi, Leelavathi | Raj Mohan | |
| Nanna Shathru | K. S. R. Das | Vishnuvardhan, Rekha, Srinath | Rajan–Nagendra | |
| Nanna Thangi | Perala | Devaraj, Soundarya, Anjana, Sanjay | Hamsalekha | |
| Obbarigintha Obbaru | A. M. Samuella | Sunil, Chi Guru Dutt, Kinnera, Vanitha Vasu | S. A. Rajkumar | |
| Ondu Cinema Kathe | Phani Ramachandra | Ananth Nag, Devaraj, Anjana, Abhilasha | Rajan–Nagendra | |
| Police File | G. K. Mudduraj | Devaraj, Vinaya Prasad, Tara, Jaggesh | Hamsalekha | |
| Police Lockup | K. V. Raju | Arjun Sarja, Kavya, Vinaya Prasad, Thyagarajan | V. Manohar | |
| Prajegalu Prabhugalu | Bi Ma Nagaraj; Vijayalakshmi Vishukumar | Devaraj, Lokanath, Doddanna, Anitha Rani | Manoranjan Prabhakar | |
| Pranayada Pakshigalu | S. Mahendar | Ramesh Aravind, Kavya, Anjali, Manasa | Manoranjan Prabhakar | |
| Prema Sangama | H. R. Bhargava | Ambareesh, Malashri, Jai Jagadish, Tara | Rajan–Nagendra | |
| Pruthviraj | Renuka Sharma | Devaraj, Bhavya, Abhilasha, Avinash | Sax Raja | |
| Purushotthama | M. S. Rajashekar | Shivarajkumar, Shivaranjini | Hamsalekha | |
| Putta Hendthi | A. T. Raghu | Tiger Prabhakar, Kumari Rekha, Vajramuni, Doddanna | Vijaya Bhaskar | |
| Rajadhi Raja | H. R. Bhargava | Vishnuvardhan, K. S. Ashwath, Rupini | Vijay Anand | |
| Ravivarma | Joe Simon | Vishnuvardhan, Bhavya, Rupini, Jai Jagadish | Upendra Kumar | |
| Sahasi | Om Sai Prakash | Malashri, Sunil, Jaggesh, Vajramuni | Hamsalekha | |
| Sangya Balya | Sundar Krishna Urs | Ramakrishna, Vijay Kashi, Umashri, Bharathi Patil | Vijaya Bhaskar | |
| Sapthapadi | H.R. Bhargava | Ambareesh, Sudha Rani, Rupini, Ramesh Bhat | Upendra Kumar | |
| Shakthi Yukthi | B Ramamurthy | Ananth Nag, Vinaya Prasad, Pramod Chakravarthy, Bhuvana, Doddanna | Manoranjan Prabhakar | |
| Shambhavi | Rama Narayanan | Shamili, Sunil, Shruthi, Sangeeta | Shankar–Ganesh | |
| Shivanaga | K. S. R. Das | Arjun Sarja, Malashri, Mukhyamantri Chandru | Rajan–Nagendra | |
| Sindhoora Thilaka | Om Sai Prakash | Sunil, Malashri, Shruthi, Jaggesh | Upendra Kumar | |
| Snehada Kadalalli | Joe Simon | Arjun Sarja, Malashri, Sunil, Rockline Venkatesh | Raj–Koti | |
| Solillada Saradara | Om Sai Prakash | Ambareesh, Bhavya, Malashri | Hamsalekha | |
| Soori | L Raja | Shashikumar, Padmini, Umashri, Vajramuni | Raj–Koti | |
| Sriramachandra | D. Rajendra Babu | V. Ravichandran, Mohini, Srinath, Umashri, Vajramuni | Hamsalekha | |
| Super Nanna Maga | G. K. Mudduraj | Jaggesh, Swathi Ganguli, Bank Janardhan, Komal Kumar | V. Manohar | |
| Tharle Nan Maga | Upendra | Jaggesh, Priyanka, Anjali Sudhakar, Bank Janardhan | V. Manohar | |
| Undu Hoda Kondu Hoda | Nagathihalli Chandrashekar | Ananth Nag, Tara, Karibasavaiah, Maanu, Vijay Kashi, M. S. Umesh | Vijaya Bhaskar | |
| Vajrayudha | B. Ramamurthy | Ramesh Aravind, Malashri, Ananth Nag, Tara | Hamsalekha | |

== See also ==
- Kannada films of 1991
- Kannada films of 1993
