= List of Kannada films of 1991 =

== Top-grossing films ==
Rank	Title	Collection	Ref.
1.	Ramachaari	₹10 crore (₹91.44 crore in 2025)	
2.	Shanti Kranti	₹8 crore (₹73.15 crore in 2025)	
3.	Lion Jagapati Rao	₹5 crore (₹45.72 crore in 2025)	
4.	Avatara Purusha	₹3 crore (₹27.43 crore in 2025)	
5.	Kaliyuga Bheema	₹2.5 crore (₹22.86 crore in 2025)	

== List ==
The following is a list of films produced in the Kannada film industry in India in 1991, presented in alphabetical order.

Title	Director	Cast	Music
Ajagajantara	Kashinath	Kashinath, Anjana, Sriraksha, Bank Janardhan	Hamsalekha
Anatha Rakshaka	T. Janardhan	Shashikumar, Sunil, Rohini, Apsara, Tara	Hamsalekha
Aralida Hoovugalu	Chi. Dattaraj	Shiva Rajkumar, Vidhyasree, Srinath, Chi Guru Dutt	Upendra Kumar
Aranyadalli Abhimanyu	H. R. Bhargava	Ambareesh, Poonam Dasgupta, Devaraj, Jaggesh	Laxmikant–Pyarelal
Avatara Purusha	Raj Kishor	Ambareesh, Sumalatha	Vijay Anand
Balaka Ambedkar	Basavaraj	Chiranjeevi Vinay, Master Amith, Master Umesh, Theertha Prasad, Jagannatha Rao, Mahendra	Samrat
Bangaradantha Maga	Y. R. Swamy	Balaraj, Geetha Raju, Keerthi, Kalyan Kumar	S. Vasu Rao
Bhairavi	Rama Narayanan	Shamili, Sridhar, Rupini, M. S. Umesh, Shivaranjini	Shankar–Ganesh
Bhujangayyana Dashavathara	Lokesh	Lokesh, Pallavi Joshi, Girija Lokesh, Vadiraj, Krishne Gowda	Hamsalekha
Bombay Dada	Tiger Prabhakar	Tiger Prabhakar, Lakshmi, Vajramuni	Shankar–Ganesh
C. B. I. Shiva	B. Ramamurthy	Tiger Prabhakar, Ramesh Aravind, Jaggesh, Tara, Chandrika	Upendra Kumar
CBI Vijay	V. Uma Shankar	Ambareesh, Roopa Ganguly, Ramesh Aravind	Guna Singh
Central Rowdy	B. Ramamurthy	Ambareesh, Anjana, Mukhyamantri Chandru	Shankar–Ganesh
Diamond Secret	Vijayakala	Ravindra, Vijayakala, Latha, Vijaya	Eeshwar
Durga Shakti	Surya	Devaraj, Shruthi	Rajesh Ramnath
Durgashtami	Geethapriya	Ashok, Mahalakshmi, Vajramuni	Shankar–Ganesh
Elukoti Marthanda Bhairava	Shankarlinga Sugnalli	Srinath, Tara, Doddanna	Amarapriya
Gandanige Thakka Hendthi	H. R. Bhargava	Shashikumar, Chandrika, Shruthi	Rajan–Nagendra
Gandu Sidigundu	M. S. Rajashekar	Ambareesh, Malashri, Thoogudeepa Srinivas	Upendra Kumar
Garuda Dhwaja	Bharathi Raja	Ambareesh, Srinath, Ramesh Aravind, Nirupama	Upendra Kumar
Gauri Ganesha	Phani Ramachandra	Ananth Nag, Vinaya Prasad, Shruti, Mukhyamantri Chandru, Ramesh Bhat, Sihi Kahi Chandru, Master Anand	Rajan–Nagendra
Giri Mallige	Mohammed Fakruddin	Vijayakumar, Thriveni, Sundar Raj	M. Ranga Rao
Golmaal Radhakrishna 2	Om Sai Prakash	Ananth Nag, Kavya, Chandrika, Tara, Mukhyamantri Chandru	Upendra Kumar
Gowri Kalyana	Dwarakish	Harshavardhan, Nithya, M. P. Shankar, Vajramuni	S. A. Rajkumar
Gruhapravesha	Om Sai Prakash	Sridhar, Devaraj, Malashri, Mukhyamantri Chandru	Upendra Kumar
Halli Rambhe Belli Bombe	M. S. Rajashekar	Chi. Guru Dutt, Malashri, Chi. Udayashankar, M. P. Shankar, Umashri	Upendra Kumar
Hatyakanda	Kashinath Gayathonde Krishna Gaitonde	Devaraj, Abhinaya, Avinash	Hamsalekha
Hosamane Aliya	B. Ramamurthy	Ananth Nag, Bhavya, Mukhyamantri Chandru, Ramesh Bhat	Manoranjan Prabhakar
Hrudaya Haadithu	M. S. Rajashekar	Ambareesh, Malashri, Bhavya, K. S. Ashwath	Upendra Kumar
Ibbaru Hendira Muddina Police	Relangi Narasimharao	Shashikumar, Tara, Nirosha, Umashree	Raj–Koti
Ide Police Belt	Mudduraju	Devaraj, Jaggesh, Vinaya Prasad, Tara	Hamsalekha
Iduve Jeevana	Sunand	Ramakrishna, Shivaranjini, Abhilasha, Balaram	Vijaya Bhaskar
Jagadeka Veera	H. R. Bhargava	Vishnuvardhan, Ashok, Triveni, Rohini	Rajan–Nagendra
Kaala Chakra	D. Rajendra Babu	Ambareesh, Deepika Chikhalia, Prakash Rai	M. Ranga Rao
Kadana	K. V. Raju	Ambareesh, Roopa Ganguly, Tara, Devaraj	Sangeetha Raja
Kalla Malla	Om Sai Prakash	Shashikumar, Jaggesh, Doddanna, Priyanka, Jai Jagadish, Umashri	Upendra Kumar
Kaliyuga Bheema	Tiger Prabhakar	Tiger Prabhakar, Sumalatha, Kushboo, Pandari Bai, Srinath	Hamsalekha
Kalyana Mantapa	V. Govinda Raj	Raghavendra Rajkumar, Mohini, Umashree	Upendra Kumar
Keralida Kesari	K. V. Jayaram	Shashikumar, Shivaranjani, Tiger Prabhakar, Tennis Krishna	Sangeetha Raja
Kiladi Gandu	B. Ramamurthy	Prabhakar, Ramesh Aravind, Vinaya Prasad, Tara	Manoranjan
Kitturina Huli	Om Sai Prakash	Shashikumar, Malashri, Chi. Guru Dutt, Mukhyamantri Chandru	Upendra Kumar
Kollur Kala	Om Sai Prakash	Shashikumar, Malashri, Vidhyasree, Rajeev	Upendra Kumar
Krama	Asrar Abid	Srinath, Tara, Vijayakashi, Udaya Hutthinagadde	R. Damodar
Lion Jagapathi Rao	Om Sai Prakash	Vishnuvardhan, Bhavya, Lakshmi	Upendra Kumar
Mangalya	B. Subba Rao	Sridhar, Malashri, Sunil, Srinath, Vani Viswanath	Rajan–Nagendra
Maneli Ili Beedili Huli	Om Sai Prakash	Ananth Nag, Shashikumar, Tara, Mahalakshmi	Shankar–Ganesh
Mathru Bhagya	Chandrashekar Sharma	Tiger Prabhakar, Mahalakshmi, Devaraj, Vanitha Vasu	Upendra Kumar
Modada Mareyalli	M. S. Rajashekar	Shiva Rajkumar, Soumya, Srinath, K. S. Ashwath	Rajan–Nagendra
Mysore Mallige	T. S. Nagabharana	Anand, Sudha Rani, Girish Karnad	C. Ashwath
Naagini	Sripriya	Shankar Nag, Ananth Nag, Rajani, Geetha, Tara, Devaraj	Shankar–Ganesh
Nanagu Hendthi Beku	B. Ramamurthy	Srikanth, Vinod Raj, Madhuri, Shivaranjani, Tara	Manoranjan Prabhakar
Navathare	N. R. Nanjunde Gowda	Kumar Bangarappa, Anusha, GR Viswanath, Srinath	Hamsalekha
Neenu Nakkare Haalu Sakkare	Dorai-Bhagavan	Vishnuvardhan, Rupini, Vinaya Prasad, Rajani, Chandrika, Anjali, M. S. Umesh	Hamsalekha
Police Matthu Dada	Tulasi Shyam	Vishnuvardhan, Roopa Ganguly, Sangeeta Bijlani	Bappi Lahiri
Prema Pareekshe	S. Umesh	Tiger Prabhakar, Ramakrishna, Bhavya	Upendra Kumar
Puksatte Ganda Hotte Tumba Unda	Rajkishore	Ambareesh, Vidhyasree, Bhavya	Hamsalekha
Punda Prachanda	Sudhindra Kallola	Shankar Nag, Ramesh Aravind, Shruti, Vanitha Vasu	Hamsalekha
Ramachaari	D. Rajendra Babu	V. Ravichandran, Malashri, Prakash Rai, Lokesh, Girija Lokesh, Sumithra	Hamsalekha
Ranachandi	G. K. Mudduraj	Sharath Babu, Radha, Mukhyamantri Chandru	Sax Raja
Readymade Ganda	Om Sai Prakash	Shashikumar, Malashri, Mukhyamantri Chandru, Doddanna	Upendra Kumar
Rollcall Ramakrishna	B. Ramamurthy	Ananth Nag, Vidhyasree, Tara, Devaraj	Upendra Kumar
Rowdy & MLA	Om Sai Prakash	Ambareesh, Malashri, Jaggesh, Srinath	Hamsalekha
Sagar Sangama	Arani Rudresh	Arani Rudresh, Sanganath, Bhavyashree, Bhagyashree	R. S. James
Shanti Kranti	V. Ravichandran	V. Ravichandran, Juhi Chawla, Kushboo, Ramesh Aravind, Ananth Nag	Hamsalekha
Shivaraj	Joe Simon	Shashikumar, Bhavya, Doddanna, Avinash	Hamsalekha
Shwethagni	B. Ramamurthy	Devaraj, Tara, Shamili, Vinaya Prasad	Manoranjan Prabhakar
S. P. Bhargavi	V. Somashekhar	Devaraj, Malashri, Doddanna, Srinath	Hamsalekha
Sri Nanjundeshwara Mahime	Hunsur Krishnamurthy; M S Ramachandra	Srinath, Udayakumar, Srinivasa Murthy, Padmapriya, Srilalitha	M. Ranga Rao
Sundarakanda	K. V. Raju	Shankar Nag, Shivaranjani, Tara, Devaraj, Jayanthi	Sangeetha Raja
Thavarumane Udugore	B. Subba Rao	Sridhar, Malashri, Sunil, Umashri	Upendra Kumar
Undu Hoda Kondu Hoda	Nagathihalli Chandrashekar	Ananth Nag, Tara, Vijay Kashi, M. S. Umesh	Vijaya Bhaskar
Varagala Bete	Renuka Sharma	Tiger Prabhakar, Ramesh Aravind, Sudharani, Sridhar, Madhushree	M. Ranga Rao
Veera Dheera	G. K. Mudduraj	Devaraj, Thiagarajan, Anjana	Hamsalekha
Veerappan	Ravindranath	Devaraj, Lokesh, Vanitha Vasu	Guna Singh

== See also ==
- Kannada films of 1990
- Kannada films of 1992
