= Citizen (2008 film) =

- Directed by: Om Sai Prakash
- Screenplay by: C. V. Reddy
- Dialogues by: B. L. Venu; S. V. Ravikumar
- Story by: C. V. Reddy
- Produced by: C. V. Reddy
- Starring: Sai Kumar; Ashish Vidyarthi
- Cinematography: Manohar C.
- Edited by: M. Muniraju
- Music by: Vandemataram Srinivas
- Production company: C. V. Arts Pvt. Ltd
- Release date: 11 July 2008
- Country: India
- Language: Kannada

Citizen is a 2008 Indian Kannada-language political action drama film directed by Om Sai Prakash and starring Sai Kumar and Ashish Vidyarthi.

== Cast ==
- Sai Kumar as Bharat
- Ashish Vidyarthi as Simhadri
- Jayaprakash Reddy
- Ajay
- Vaibhavi
- Sadashiva Brahmavar
- M. S. Umesh
- Layendra Kokila
- Chidanand
- Joe Simon

== Production ==
The film began production as a Kannada-Telugu bilingual and was Sai Kumar's 50th Kannada film and 75th Telugu film. The Kannada version began production on 26 January 2008. The Telugu version was launched at Annapurna Studios on 21 February 2008 with Tammareddy Bharadwaja in attendance. The film was predominantly shot in Rayalaseema.

== Soundtrack ==
All lyrics are written by R. N. Jayagopal and Kaviraj; all music is composed by Vandemataram Srinivas.

Track listing
No.	Title	Singer(s)	Length
1.	"Mariyade Mariyade"	Suchitra
2.	"Agnikunda"	S. P. Balasubrahmanyam

== Reception ==
R. G. Vijayasarathy of Rediff.com rated the film 1/5 stars and wrote, "Citizen's narration reminds you of films made in the 1960s, when there were no technical equipments to enhance films".
