= Loafer (1996 film) =

- Poster
- Directed by: David Dhawan
- Written by: Jalees Sherwani (dialogue); P. Vasu (screenplay and story)
- Based on: Velai Kidaichuduchu (1990) by P. Vasu
- Produced by: Surinder Kapoor; Boney Kapoor
- Starring: Anil Kapoor; Juhi Chawla; Shakti Kapoor
- Cinematography: Rajan Kinagi
- Edited by: A. Muthu
- Music by: Anand–Milind
- Production company: Narsimha Enterprises
- Distributed by: Narsimha Enterprises
- Release date: 7 June 1996
- Running time: 146 minutes
- Country: India
- Language: Hindi

Loafer is a 1996 Indian Hindi-language masala film directed by David Dhawan and produced by Surinder Kapoor and Boney Kapoor. It stars Anil Kapoor and Juhi Chawla in pivotal roles. The film was a remake of the 1990 Tamil film Velai Kidaichuduchu.

== Cast ==
- Anil Kapoor as Ravi Kumar
- Juhi Chawla as Kiran Mathur
- Pramod Muthu as Dhandpani
- Mukesh Rishi as Badshah
- Gulshan Grover as Krupashankar
- Kulbhushan Kharbanda as Vidyapati Kumar, Ravi's father
- Farida Jalal as Janki Kumar
- Shakti Kapoor as Bhiku - Ravi's Mamaji
- Vikas Anand as Mohan Mathur, Kiran's father
- Tiku Talsania as Hotel Client / School Principal Narayan
- Viju Khote as Hotel Manager Damodar
- Kunickaa Sadanand as Flirting Woman Sweety
- Yunus Parvez as Husband Saxena of Flirting woman
- Vivek Vaswani as Pandey
- Deep Dhillon as Tatya
- Chandrashekhar as Judge Surinder
- Chandrakant Gokhale as Oldster Rajesh, juice seller
- Dharmesh Tiwari as Shankar ,Son of Juice Seller
- Anil Dhawan as Govt Officer KK
- Ishrat Ali as Public Prosecutor Lambu Atta
- Dinesh Anand as Insp. Bhagwat

== Soundtrack ==
Loafer

Studio album by Anand–Milind
- Released: 1996
- Length: 39:00
- Label: Tips Music

| # | Title | Singer(s) |
|---|---|---|
| 1. | "Teri Tirchi Nazar Mein" | Udit Narayan |
| 2. | "Tere Dil Ne" | Shankar Mahadevan; Gayatri Iyer |
| 3. | "Aao Chalo Hum Karein" | Udit Narayan; Poornima |
| 4. | "Meri Tirchi Nazar Mein" | Alka Yagnik |
| 5. | "Kuch Kuch Kuch Ho Raha Hai" | Udit Narayan; Poornima |
| 6. | "Jiske Liye Pal Bhar" | Alka Yagnik; Udit Narayan |
| 7. | "Pandit Ji Haath Mera" | Udit Narayan; Alka Yagnik |
