= Guru Brahma =

- Directed by: Veerappa Maralavadi
- Written by: Veerappa Maralavadi
- Screenplay by: Veerappa Maralavadi
- Produced by: Bhanu
- Starring: V. Ravichandran; Sukanya; Lokesh; Sumithra
- Cinematography: Kabir Lal
- Edited by: K Balu
- Music by: Hamsalekha
- Production company: Sri Ranga Creations
- Release date: 4 August 1992
- Country: India
- Language: Kannada

Guru Brahma (Kannada: ಗುರು ಬ್ರಹ್ಮ) is a 1992 Indian Kannada film, directed by Veerappa Maralavadi and produced by Bhanu. The film stars V. Ravichandran, Sukanya, Lokesh and Sumithra in lead roles. The film had musical score by Hamsalekha. This is one of those rare movies where both hero and heroine played dual roles.

== Cast ==
- V. Ravichandran
- Sukanya
- Lokesh
- Sumithra
- Ramakrishna
- Brahmavar
- Ramesh Bhat
- Mukhyamantri Chandru
- Ashalatha
- Mandeep Roy
- Shani Mahadevappa
- Rathnakar
- Agro Chikkanna
- B K Shankar
- Bharath Bhagavathar
- Go Ra Bheema Rao
- Nanjundaiah

== Soundtrack ==
The music was composed and lyrics for the soundtrack written by Hamsalekha.

Track listing
No.	Title	Singer(s)	Length
1.	"Varuna Varuna"	Mano, K. S. Chithra
2.	"Deepa Deepa Roopa"	K. J. Yesudas, K. S. Chithra
3.	"Hetthu Hotthu Mutthu"	K. J. Yesudas, Mano, Manjula Gururaj
4.	"O Prema Prema"	Mano, Rajesh Krishnan
5.	"Maduve Maduve"	K. J. Yesudas, Mano, K. S. Chithra
