= Jagadeka Veera =

- Video cover
- Directed by: H. R. Bhargava
- Written by: Kunigal Nagabhushan
- Screenplay by: H. R. Bhargava
- Story by: T. S. Sainath
- Produced by: B. Vijaya Kumar; H. Ramamurthy; N. Venkatesh; M. Rajagopal; K. Varadaraj; S. A. Sathyam
- Starring: Vishnuvardhan; Ashok; Rohini; Thriveni
- Cinematography: Mallikarjun
- Edited by: B. Nagesh
- Music by: Rajan–Nagendra
- Production company: Sri Vinayaka Combines
- Distributed by: Sri Vinayaka Combines
- Release date: 12 November 1991
- Running time: 146 min
- Country: India
- Language: Kannada

Jagadeka Veera (Kannada: ಜಗದೇಕ ವೀರ) is a 1991 Indian Kannada film, directed by H. R. Bhargava and produced by B. Vijaya Kumar, H. Ramamurthy, N. Venkatesh, M. Rajagopal, K. Varadaraj and S. A. Sathyam. The film stars Vishnuvardhan, Ashok, Rohini and Thriveni in the lead roles. The film has musical score by Rajan–Nagendra.

== Cast ==
- Vishnuvardhan
- Ashok
- Rohini
- Thriveni
- Pandari Bai
- Malathi
- Kamalashree
- Bhavani
- K. S. Ashwath
- Ramesh Bhat
- Sudheer
- Sathyajith
- Sihikahi Chandru
- Prakash Rai
- Rajanand
- Bangalore Nagesh
- Dingri Nagaraj
- Saikumar
- Mandeep Roy
- Shankar Patil
- M. S. Karanth
- Shani Mahadevappa
- Janardhan
- Bemel Somanna
- B. K. Shankar
- Shankar Bhat
- M. S. L. Murthy
- Srishailan

== Soundtrack ==
Soundtrack was composed by Rajan-Nagendra.

- Ninna Roopa - S. P. Balasubrahmanyam, K. S. Chithra
- Naanu Neenu - S. P. Balasubrahmanyam, K. S. Chithra
- Jumma Jumma - S. P. Balasubrahmanyam, Manjula Gururaj
- Nanna Preethi - K. S. Chithra
- Samsara Endare - S. P. Balasubrahmanyam, Manjula Gururaj
