= Ennennum Kannettante =

- Ennennum Kannettante poster
- Directed by: Fazil
- Screenplay by: Fazil
- Story by: Madhu Muttam
- Produced by: Sajan
- Starring: Sangeet Pillai; Sonia G. Nair
- Cinematography: Vipindas
- Edited by: T. R. Shekhar
- Music by: Jerry Amaldev
- Production company: Saj Productions
- Release date: 10 April 1986
- Country: India
- Language: Malayalam

Ennennum Kannettante (transl. Kannettan's Forever) is a 1986 Indian Malayalam-language romance film, written and directed by Fazil, starring newcomers Sangeet Pillai and Sonia G. Nair. The film won the Kerala State Film Award for Best Film with Popular Appeal and Aesthetic Value for the year 1986. Srividya won the Kerala State Film Award for Second Best Actress also for this film. Despite all the critical acclaim, the film was a box office failure. It was remade in Tamil by the same director as Varusham 16 (1989) and also in Kannada as Halli Krishna Delhi Radha (1992).

== Plot ==
Ennennum Kannettante is a teenage love story. It portrays the incomplete love story of 19-year-old Kannan and 16-year-old Radhika.

Kannan comes from Trivandrum to his Valiya Koikkal Tharavadu (ancestral house) with his mother to spend vacation and to attend the festival in their family temple, the Pookkulangara Devi temple. There are his relatives, like grandfather Parameswara Kurup, grandmother, head of the family and his aunt Vijayalakshmi and her children. Everybody likes Kannan very much, and he has a good time along with his friend Gopu.

But with the arrival of his uncle's daughter (Murappennu) Radhika from Bangalore after a gap of nine years to perform her dance debut (Arangettam) in the temple, everyone's attention turns to her. Kannan initially felt sad and angry but, once he sees Radhika, immediately falls in love with her. Kannan and Radhika were childhood friends and both have memories of their childhood. Radhika also likes Kannan, but was afraid to reveal it to Kannan. To know whether Radhika loves him, Kannan plans to ask her secretly and hides himself in the bathroom. Radhika sees him and cries aloud. The whole family learns of the incident, and Kannan was blamed by all, including his mother. She send a message to Kannan's father to take him back to Trivandrum for his exams. Meanwhile, Radhika reveal to Kannan that she loves him as much as he loves her. Soon, Kannan's father take him back to the city.

After finishing the exams, Kannan rushed back to the village to meet Radhika, but she had already gone to the railway station to return to Bangalore and then to the United States with her parents. Kannan rushed to the station. As he reached there, the train had already left and he couldn't meet Radhika one last time, even though he chased her train. Radhika had left a souvenir for him on the platform, but the heartbroken Kannan didn't see it.

== Cast ==
- Sangeet Pillai as Kannan
- Sonia G. Nair as Radhika
- Appa Haja as Gopu
- Nedumudi Venu as Tharavadu Karanavar
- Thilakan as Parameswara Kurup (Kannan's grandfather)
- K. P. Ummer as Kannan's father
- Srividya as Kannan's mother
- Jagathy Sreekumar as Padmanabha Pillai
- Jalaja as Vijayalakshmi (Viji)
- Sukumari
- Meena as Maheswari
- Adoor Bhavani

== Soundtrack ==
All lyrics are written by Kaithapram Damodaran except where noted; all music is composed by Jerry Amaldev.

No.	Title	Lyrics	Artist(s)	Length
1.	"Bhaagavatham"	Thunchaththu Ezhuthachan	M. G. Radhakrishnan
2.	"Devadundhubhi"		K. J. Yesudas
3.	"Devadundhubhi"		K. J. Yesudas, Satheesh Babu & Sunanda
4.	"Kaakkem Keekkem"	Madhu Muttam	Padma Subramaniam, Sunanda
5.	"Nizhalaay Pozhiyum"		K. J. Yesudas
6.	"Onnaanam Kulakkadavil"		Choir
7.	"Poovattaka Thattichinni"		K. J. Yesudas, K. S. Chithra, Choir
8.	"Thankathala Thaalam"		K. J. Yesudas, Choir

This was the first work of poet Kaithapram Damodaran as a lyricist. Kaithapram used to write poems in Mathrubhumi, and this brought him to the notice of playback singer K. J. Yesudas, who asked him to write lyrics for his Tharangini Records. Fazil heard some of these, and asked Kaithapram to write the lyrics for the film.
