= Naa Rani Nee Maharani =

- Directed by: B. Ramamurthy
- Produced by: Sathyanarayana B
- Starring: Pooja Gandhi; Akshay Shashwath
- Cinematography: Mallikarjun
- Edited by: S Soundar Rajan
- Music by: Vinay Chandra
- Production company: Dream Creations
- Release date: 10 December 2010
- Country: India
- Language: Kannada

Naa Rani Nee Maharani (transl. I am the queen, you are the great queen) is a 2010 Indian Kannada-language film directed by B. Ramamurthy starring Pooja Gandhi and Akshay Shashwath in the lead roles. The film has a similar storyline to Rani Maharani (1990), which is a remake of Hindi film ChaalBaaz (1989).

== Cast ==
- Pooja Gandhi as Rani and Pooja
- Akshay Shashwath
- Pramila Joshai
- Sundar Raj
- Ramesh Bhat
- Anilkumar
- Dingri Nagaraj
- Mohan Juneja
- Honnavalli Krishna
- Harish Roy

== Music ==
Naa Rani Nee Maharani

Soundtrack album by Vinay Chandra
- Released: 2010
- Recorded: 2010
- Genre: Feature film soundtrack
- Language: Kannada

Official audio
- Naa Rani Nee Maharani - Full Album on YouTube

Track listing
No.	Title	Length
1.	"Baarolo Baaro Eega"
2.	"Kanasalu Neene Manasalu Neene"
3.	"Koogo Kolige Khaara Masaale"
4.	"Mutthu Mutthu Maleye"

== Reception ==
Shruti Indira Lakshminarayana from Rediff.com scored the film at 1.5 out of 5 stars and says "Vinaychandra's music is soothing. The song Kugo kolige khara masala from the original has been retained. But the original composition remains unmatched, and so does the original Rani Maharani". A critic from The New Indian Express wrote "At this juncture, the director introduces a sequence explaining how Pooja’s relatives want to exploit her for the sake of money. Pooja has tried her level best to perform well, but has failed. The movie is worth watching if you want to see how Pooja manages to play the dual character". B. S. Srivani from Deccan Herald wrote "The music director is one to watch out for. The same cannot be said of Mallikarjun’s camerawork which complements Ramamurthy’s old habits. Only the bunch of kids and Pooja’s dhishoom-dhishoom in a lovely pink saree in the climax manage to linger. A wasted opportunity". A critic from DNA wrote "This is just one of the many uncertainties. In the acting department, Pooja seems to have the plum and does a good job. The two heroes remain mere props. Skip this one, opt for the DVD of the older version, we'd say". A critic from The Times of India scored the film at 2.5 out of 5 stars and wrote "Full marks to Pooja Gandhi for her brilliant performance. Sundarraj, Pramila Joshai and Ramesh Bhat excel. Debut music director Vinaya Chandra has given a couple of catchy tunes".
