= Shruthi (film) =

- Directed by: Dwarakish
- Written by: Kunigal Vasanth (Dialogues)
- Screenplay by: Dwarakish
- Story by: Vikraman
- Based on: Pudhu Vasantham (Tamil)
- Produced by: Dwarakish
- Starring: Sunil; Indudhar; Honnavalli Krishna; Shruti; Dileep
- Cinematography: Karunakara Rao
- Edited by: Goutham Raju
- Music by: S. A. Rajkumar
- Production company: Abhilash Enterprises
- Release date: 24 October 1990
- Running time: 152 min
- Country: India
- Language: Kannada

Shruthi is a 1990 Indian Kannada-language musical-drama film directed and produced by Dwarakish. A remake of the Tamil film Pudhu Vasantham (1990), the film stars Sunil, Indudhar, Honnavalli Krishna, Srivatsa, Shruti and Dileep with music composed by S. A. Rajkumar.

== Plot ==
The film tells the story of four struggling friends aspiring to be musicians when they accidentally meet a girl called Shruthi who is in search of her lover. Shruthi joins the gang of friends and helps them change their fortunes in the music industry. The sudden arrival of Shruthi's lover takes a toll on their relationship.

== Cast ==
- Sunil as Krishna
- Indudhar as Gopi
- Honnavalli Krishna as Seena
- Srivatsa as Robert
- Shruti as Sruthi
- Dileep as Vijay
- Mandeep Roy
- Vaishali Kasaravalli
- Srinath
- Geetha Srinath
- Chethan Ramarao
- Kunigal Vasanth
- Manju Malini
- Shankar Rao

== Production ==
R. B. Choudary, who held the overseas rights for Dwarakish's production Adutha Varisu, invited him to watch Pudhu Vasantham. Choudary agreed to give Dwarakish the remake rights at the cost he asked for when Dwarakish was not doing well financially.

Initially Prabhu Deva was considered to play the lead role but left to choreograph for a Chiranjeevi film. Dwarakish saw Sunil while driving on the road and cast him in the film. It was through this film that Shruti, previously credited as Priyadarshini, got her screen name, which became her identity throughout her career. The film featured several newcomers and notably features Honnavalli Krishna in a leading role. The film was made on a low budget with the total remuneration of all of the actors being just ₹5000.

== Soundtrack ==
All the songs are composed and scored by S. A. Rajkumar who also scored for the original Tamil film. The lyrics were written by Chi. Udaya Shankar, M. N. Vyasa Rao and R. N. Jayagopal. The song "Haadonda Naa Haduvenu" is based on "Pattu Onnu Naan Paadattuma" from the original. The songs were appreciated upon release.

Sl No	Song title	Singer(s)	Lyricist
1	"Kannada Thayiya Makkalu"	S. A. Rajkumar	Chi. Udaya Shankar
2	"Haadonda Naa Haduvenu"	K. J. Yesudas	R. N. Jayagopal
3	"Chilipili Enuthali"	Manjula Gururaj	Hamsalekha
4	"Thalakke Navella"	S. P. Balasubrahmanyam	M. N. Vyasa Rao
5	"Januma Janumadallu"	K. J. Yesudas, Manjula Gururaj	M. N. Vyasa Rao
6	"Hennige Thali"	S. P. Balasubrahmanyam	Chi. Udaya Shankar
7	"Haadonda Naa Haduvenu"	S. P. Balasubrahmanyam	R. N. Jayagopal

== Box office ==
The film was a box office success and Sunil and Shruti went on to appear in several films together.
