= Bangaradantha Maga =

- Directed by: Y. R. Swamy
- Written by: Keerthiraj; Suresh Swamy; Guruprasad (dialogues)
- Screenplay by: Y. R. Swamy
- Story by: Y. R. Swamy
- Produced by: R. Rama Raju
- Starring: Balaraj; Geetha Raju; Shivakumar; Keerthi
- Cinematography: V. Prabhakar
- Edited by: P. Venkateshwara Rao
- Music by: S. Vasu Rao
- Production company: Ajantha Productions
- Distributed by: Ajantha Productions
- Release date: 22 May 1991
- Running time: 135 min
- Country: India
- Language: Kannada

Bangaradantha Maga (Kannada: ಬಂಗಾರದಂಥ ಮಗ) is a 1991 Indian Kannada film, directed by Y. R. Swamy and produced by R. Rama Raju. The film stars Balaraj, Geetha Raju, Shivakumar, and Keerthi in the lead roles. The film has musical score by S. Vasu Rao.

== Cast ==
- Balaraj
- Geetha Raju
- Shivakumar
- Keerthi
- Kalyan Kumar
- Hema Choudhary
- Dinesh
- Aravind
- Rajanand
- Umashree
- Kadambari
- Shubha
- Reshma
- Sathyabhama
- Master Amith
- Master Raghavendra
- Master Rajendra Prasad
- Baby Roopa
