= Mere Sajana Saath Nibhana =

- Film poster
- Directed by: Rajesh Vakil
- Produced by: K C Bokadia
- Starring: Mithun Chakraborty; Juhi Chawla; Shantipriya
- Music by: Anand–Milind
- Release date: 7 February 1992
- Running time: 135 minutes
- Language: Hindi

Mere Sajana Saath Nibhana is a 1992 Indian Hindi-language film directed by Rajesh Vakil, starring Mithun Chakraborty, Juhi Chawla, Shantipriya and Prem Chopra. The film is the remake of the Tamil film Kizhakku Vaasal.

== Plot ==
Kanhaiya (Mithun Chakraborty) lives with his mother in a small rural town in India, and makes a living singing and dancing at wedding, birthdays, and other important ceremonies in the community along with Bhola (Shakti Kapoor), a young man whom Kanhaiya's mother had offered house and shelter when he was lost in a fair. Chanchal, community's powerful Thakur and Zamindar Raghuvir Singh's daughter, who throws pranks on Kanhaiya often, falls in love with him eventually, and asks him to approach her father for her hand in marriage. Bhola and Kanhaiya's mother approaches him accordingly, but are insulted, severely beaten and thrown out. Kanhaiya's mother tells Bhola not to disclose this incident to Kanhaiya but as a result of severe thrashing, insult and shock, Kanhaiya's mother dies and this incident makes Bhola disclose all that what had happened at the Thakur's house, leaving Kanhaiya enraged to avenge her death from the arrogant Thakur. When Thakur finds out that it was his daughter who had proposed marriage, he feels insulted and speechless for beating Bhola and his mother due to her daughter's actions. Thakur, angry with her daughter, fix her marriage to his friend Thakur Pratap Singh's son Ranjit, much against her wishes. He also apologizes to Kanhaiya and invites him to sing for his daughter's wedding. During her marriage ceremony, Chanchal apologizes for her father's actions and tells him that she truly loved him, but due to society and caste pressure she surrendered and agreed to her father's decision. This is overheard by Ranjit and he decides to cancel his marriage with Chanchal. But his father consoles him and tells him not to cancel the marriage but to keep her as a sex slave and marry a girl of his choice because Chanchal will bring much fortune with her, and that Thakur Pratap can control her family through Chanchal. But this is somehow heard by Thakur Raghuvir, and he decides to abandon the marriage.

High on rage, Ranjit, with his goons, attack Kanhaiya and inflicts him with a serious injury by a poisonous weapon. No one comes to help Kanhaiya due to fear of Thakur Pratap. It is then when Kanhaiya is helped by with Janki, a young woman, living with her mentor, Dayal, who works for Thakur Pratap Singh. Dayal who used to earn money by beating himself and showing his tolerance, is met upon by Janki, who urges him to find some good work. Dayal finds work in a house of a mistress called Shanti. Janki also lives with Dayal, and her living and education is financed by Shanti. One day Janki sees Shanti in an uncompromising position with Thakur Pratap, and gets to know that Thakur Pratap often used to come to her house. Shanti falls ill and needs immediate medical treatment which costed ₹50000. Thakur Pratap lends her the money on one condition that in case Shanti doesn't survive, Janki should take the position of Shanti. Unfortunately Shanti dies, and Janki gets caught in a situation where either she needs to repay the amount to Thakur Pratap or follow his orders and come to his bed room at the night. Dayal feels helpless and seeks help of Kanhaiya to rescue her. Janki falls in love with Kanhaiya but Pratap considers Janki his mistress, doesn't permit anyone to come near her, leave alone marry her. Kanhaiya calls in Janki and marries her in a Temple. Eventually, Pratap learns of the incident, and he and his son Ranjit tries to avenge from the death of Kanhaiya. They come to fight with Kanhaiya but the villages, mobilized by Thakur Raghuvir, attack the father & son duo and beat them up, saving Kanhaiya. The story ends with Kanhaiya and Janki being happily married.

== Soundtrack ==
| # | Title | Singer(s) |
|---|---|---|
| 1 | "Dam Dam Dafli Bajaoon" | Udit Narayan |
| 2 | "Jhoom Jhom Kahta Hai" | Udit Narayan, Kavita Krishnamurthy |
| 3 | "Banno Re Aise Kyun" | Udit Narayan, Anand Kumar |
| 4 | "Mandir Toote To" | Udit Narayan |
| 5 | "Nakhre Dikha Ke Dil Ko Chur" | Udit Narayan, Sadhana Sargam |
| 6 | "Kangana Kunware Kangana" | Udit Narayan, Sadhana Sargam |
