= Sahasi =

- Directed by: Om Sai Prakash
- Written by: Y. Madhavaiah
- Screenplay by: Om Sai Prakash
- Produced by: P. Vidyasagar
- Starring: Sunil; Malashri; Jaggesh
- Cinematography: Kulashekhar
- Edited by: P. Venkateshwara Rao
- Music by: Hamsalekha
- Production company: Sai Arts
- Release date: 1992
- Running time: 116 minutes
- Country: India
- Language: Kannada

Sahasi is a 1992 Indian Kannada-language action film directed by Om Sai Prakash and produced by P. Vidyasagar. The film stars Malashri, Sunil and Jaggesh. The film's music was composed by Hamsalekha and the audio was launched on the Lahari Music banner.

== Cast ==
- Malashri
- Sunil
- Vajramuni
- Jaggesh
- Shivaram
- M. S. Umesh
- Bank Janardhan
- M. S. Karanth
- Bangalore Nagesh
- Kavitha
- Rathnakar
- Malathi
- Om Sai Prakash in a guest appearance

== Soundtrack ==
The music of the film was composed and songs written by Hamsalekha.

Track listing
No.	Title	Lyrics	Singer(s)	Length
1.	"Kogile Kogile"	Hamsalekha	S. P. Balasubrahmanyam, K. S. Chithra
2.	"Saadisi Thorisu Sahasi"	Hamsalekha	S. P. Balasubrahmanyam
3.	"Hasiru Baliya Kesari Jhanda"	Hamsalekha	S. P. Balasubrahmanyam
4.	"Swatantra Thanda"	Hamsalekha	S. P. Balasubrahmanyam
5.	"Hasiru Baliya Kesari Jhanda (Female)"	Hamsalekha	Manjula Gururaj
