= Rani Maharani =

- Directed by: B. Ramamurthy
- Screenplay by: B. Ramamurthy; Veerappa Maralavadi
- Produced by: Jai Jagadish
- Starring: Malashri; Ambareesh; Shashikumar
- Cinematography: S. V. Srikanth
- Edited by: S. Manohar
- Music by: Hamsalekha
- Production company: Arpitha Arts
- Release date: 1990
- Running time: 149 minutes
- Country: India
- Language: Kannada

Rani Maharani is a 1990 Indian Kannada language film directed by B. Ramamurthy, starring Malashri, Ambareesh and Shashikumar in lead roles. The supporting cast features Jaggesh, Umashree, Doddanna, Mysore Lokesh, Umesh, Tennis Krishna. The film is a remake of 1989 Bollywood film ChaalBaaz. It was remade in 2010 by B. Ramamurthy, titled Naa Rani Nee Maharani.

== Plot synopsis ==
Rani and Maharani, twin sisters with contrasting personalities, get separated at a young age. Later when they cross paths, Rani finds out about Maharani's abusive family and switches places with her to teach Maharani's family a lesson.

== Cast ==
- Malashri
- Ambareesh
- Shashi Kumar
- Umashree
- Doddanna
- Jaggesh
- Mysore Lokesh
- M. S. Umesh
- Tennis Krishna

== Soundtrack ==
Hamsalekha composed the background score the film and the soundtracks and penning the lyrics for the soundtracks. The album has five soundtracks.

Tracklist
No.	Title	Lyrics	Singer(s)	Length
1.	"Gundige Kal Gundige"	Hamsalekha	Ramesh, Manjula Gururaj	5:01
2.	"Koogo Kolige Kaara Masale"	Hamsalekha	Manjula Gururaj	4:33
3.	"Baare Binkamma"	Hamsalekha	Ramesh, Manjula Gururaj	5:06
4.	"Eddalo Eddalo"	Hamsalekha	Manjula Gururaj	2:53
5.	"Bandalo Bandalo"	Hamsalekha	Manjula Gururaj
