= Dilan Teer Bija =

1987 Balochi-language political song

Dilan Teer Bija (or Dila Teer Bija; lit. 'an arrow to your heart', the arrow being the election symbol for the Pakistan People's Party) is a Pakistani Balochi-language political song composed by Zahoor Khan Zeibi and sung by Shabana Noshi. The song was originally released in 1987 as part of a larger five-album set of music to support Benazir Bhutto and the Pakistan People's Party (PPP) in the following year's general election. Genre-wise, the song mixes traditional Balochi folk music with influence from the Lyari disco scene, a Karachi neighborhood known as a PPP stronghold where the song was recorded. The song was one of the first produced for a party's political campaign in Pakistan, and became popular upon release, with the PPP and it's ideological ally Muhajir Qaumi Movement going on to produce many political songs in Karachi through to the 1993 Pakistani general election, where the opposing Jamaat-i-Islami party also produced their own song. Later on, the song also became popular in Hyderabad, India as a wedding song in the marfa tradition arising from its similar rhythm and use of the dhol compared to traditional marfa songs. It has become so embedded in the culture of Hyderabad that many people there are unaware of its Pakistani origin and it is often simply called "the Bhutto song". Additionally, the song's melody was adapted for the number Main Na Jhoot Bolun in the 1991 Indian film Indrajeet. In 2010, Bakhtawar Bhutto Zardari, Benazir's daughter, and Stewart Copeland remixed the song for the documentary film Bhutto.
