= Chilakapachcha Kaapuram =

- Cover
- Directed by: Kodi Ramakrishna
- Written by: Akella (dialogues)
- Screenplay by: Kodi Ramakrishna
- Story by: M. S. Madhu (original); Divya Art Pictures Unit
- Based on: Kizhakku Vasal (1990)
- Produced by: C. Surendra Raju
- Starring: Jagapathi Babu; Meena; Soundarya
- Cinematography: Kodi Lakshman
- Edited by: Suresh Tata
- Music by: Vidyasagar
- Production company: Divya Art Pictures
- Release date: 7 February 1995
- Running time: 135 minutes
- Country: India
- Language: Telugu

Chilakapachcha Kaapuram (transl. A green parrot's life) is a 1995 Indian Telugu-language drama film, produced by C. Surendra Raju under the Divya Art Pictures banner, directed by Kodi Ramakrishna. It stars Jagapathi Babu, Meena and Soundarya, with music composed by Vidyasagar. The film is a remake of the Tamil movie Kizhakku Vasal (1990). The film was recorded as a hit at the box office. Despite being remade from Tamil film, this Telugu remake was dubbed in Tamil as Thedi Vandha Devathai.

== Plot ==
The film begins in a village adjacent to the river Godavari. Parasuramaiah and Bullabbai are the most influential members of the community. They are brothers-in-law and are also rivals for the leadership of the village. Gopala Krishna is a local boatman who is beloved by the villagers. He wishes to end the brothers-in-law's conflict. Satyavati, the daughter of Parasuramaiah secretly loves Gopala Krishna. Bullabbai brings a young woman from the city named Radha and keeps her isolated in a mansion. Curious about this development, Gopala Krishna secretly enters the premises. He befriends her and both eventually fall in love. Meanwhile, Gopala Krishna's mother Ramulamma is aware of Satyavathi's love and proposes marriage between her and Gopala Krishna. However, she is humiliated by Parasuramaiah who cannot believe that Ramulamma dared to ask for the hand of his daughter for her boatman son. As a result, she commits suicide. This enrages Gopala Krishna and he attacks Parasuramaiah, almost killing him before being restrained by Parasuramaiah's wife's pleadings.

Parasuramaiah joins with Bullabbai for vengeance. They stab Gopala Krishna. Radha takes him to the hospital after rescuing him. Gopala Krishna asks Radha about her past. Radha was a simple girl when her mother became terminally ill. Bullabbai exploited her situation and made her come to the village with him. He wishes to make her his mistress but she has so far managed to put him off while searching for a way out of his clutch. Gopala Krishna decides to marry Radha so that he can protect her from her tormentor. Meanwhile, Parasuramaiah's wife manages to change his mind and he accepts Satyavati's love for Gopala Krishna. Bullabai attacks Gopala Krishna and Radha but the villagers chase him and he is eventually killed in the skirmish. Finally, the movie ends on a happy note with the union of Gopala Krishna and Radha with Satyavati sacrificing her love.

== Cast ==
- Jagapathi Babu as Gopala Krishna
- Meena as Radha
- Soundarya as Satyavathi
- Charan Raj as Bullabbai
- Giri Babu
- Costumes Krishna
- Mukka Narasimha Rao as Parasuramaiah
- Annapurna as Parasuramaiah's wife
- Silk Smitha as item number in "Gopiloluda"
- Subha as Ramulamma
- Dubbing Janaki as Bullabbai's wife

== Soundtrack ==
Chilakapachcha Kaapuram

Film score by Vidyasagar
- Released: 1995
- Genre: Soundtrack
- Length: 23:26
- Label: Supreme Music
- Producer: Vidyasagar

Vidyasagar chronology
Alibaba 6 Dongalu	Chilakapachcha Kaapuram (1995)	Vetagadu (1995)

Music composed by Vidyasagar. Music released on Supreme Music Company.

No.	Title	Lyrics	Singer(s)	Length
1.	"Koyilamma Konalona"	Sahithi	S. P. Balasubrahmanyam	4:55
2.	"Kanugonti Kanugonti"	Sirivennela Sitarama Sastry	S. P. Balasubrahmanyam	4:33
3.	"Kittayyo Kittayyo" (Picturised on Jagapathi Babu and Soundaraya and features colors.)	Bhuvanachandra	S. P. Balasubrahmanyam	4:42
4.	"Kanchi Pattu Cheera Katti"	Sirivennela Sitarama Sastry	S. P. Balasubrahmanyam, S. Janaki	4:36
5.	"Gopiloluda"	Sahithi	Malgudi Subha	4:40
Total length:				23:26
