= Indrajeet =

- Film poster
- Directed by: K. V. Raju
- Written by: Kader Khan (dialogues)
- Story by: K. V. Raju
- Produced by: Ramesh Behl
- Starring: Amitabh Bachchan; Jaya Prada; Kumar Gaurav; Neelam
- Cinematography: Peter Pereira
- Edited by: Sunder Shetty
- Music by: R. D. Burman
- Production company: Rose Audio Visuals
- Release date: 2 August 1991
- Running time: 182 minutes
- Country: India
- Language: Hindi

Indrajeet is a 1991 Bollywood action film directed by K. V. Raju. The film stars Amitabh Bachchan, and Jaya Prada in lead roles, with Kumar Gaurav, Neelam, Saeed Jaffrey, Sadashiv Amrapurkar, and Kader Khan in supporting roles. The film was a remake of the director's own Kannada film Bandha Muktha (1987), starring Tiger Prabhakar.

== Plot summary ==
Honest Police officer Inderjeet's life takes a turn for the worse when he has to arrest his lady love Shanti's (Jaya Prada) father, Mr. Din Dayal for murder, but gets transferred. Years later, retired Inderjeet arranges his adopted daughter Neelu's (Neelam Kothari) marriage with Vijay (Kumar Gaurav), but the married couple gets killed by Shanti's brother and his friends. When the police take no action, Inderjeet decides to take the law into his hands to avenge his adopted daughter's death.

== Cast ==
- Amitabh Bachchan as Inspector Indrajeet
- Jaya Prada as Shanti
- Kumar Gaurav as Vijay
- Neelam as Neelu
- Saeed Jaffrey as Seth Dindayal
- Sadashiv Amrapurkar as Police Commissioner Shyam Sundar
- Kader Khan as Minister Sadachari
- Ajit Pal Mangat as Ajit Kumar
- Avtar Gill as Inspector Vishnu
- Vijayendra Ghatge as Inspector Sudhir
- Ashutosh Gowarikar as Ashu
- Ajinkya Deo
- Mahesh Anand as Mahesh
- Sharat Saxena as Batra
- Kamal Kapoor as College Principal
- Gulshan Bawra as Khurana
- Suresh Chatwal as Chandu
- Nirupa Roy as Mother of Indrajeet seen only in photo frame (Uncredited)
- Shagufta Ali as Item Dancer in Hotel Bar (Special Appearance) in the song Reshmi Zulfen

== Soundtrack ==
All music was composed by Rahul Dev Burman and written by Gulshan Bawra. Main Na Jhoot Bolun notably uses an adaption of the melody for the 1987 Pakistani song Dilan Teer Bija.

Song	Singer
"Ab To Humko"	Asha Bhosle, Amit Kumar
"Main Khule Aam"	Asha Bhosle, Amit Kumar
"Main Na Jhuth Boloon"	Asha Bhosle, Amit Kumar
"Duniyawale Yeh"	Mir Sahib
"Jab Tak Jaan Mein"	Sudesh Bhosle
"Reshmi Zulfen, Nasheeli Aankhen"	Abhijeet, Jolly Mukherjee, Ranu Mukherjee
