= Road Romeo =

- Directed by: Om Sai Prakash
- Written by: B. A. Madhu (dialogues)
- Screenplay by: Om Sai Prakash; M. S. Abhishek
- Story by: Om Sai Prakash
- Produced by: Sonali Nikhil; Nandkumar
- Starring: Dilip Pai; Ashitha
- Cinematography: Babu
- Edited by: M. Muniraju
- Music by: K. M. Indra
- Production company: Rare Brains Films
- Release date: 28 September 2007
- Country: India
- Language: Kannada

Road Romeo is a 2007 Indian Kannada-language romantic drama film directed by Om Sai Prakash and starring Dilip Pai and Ashitha. The movie was produced by Pai's brother in an attempt to launch an acting career for him.

== Plot ==
The plot centers around Dilipa, an irresponsible young man from a lower income family. He falls for Anjali, who rejects him because of his irresponsibility. Thanks to Anjali's encouragement, Dilipa learns to be a responsible man.

== Cast ==
- Dilip Pai as Dilipa
- Ashitha as Anjali
- Avinash
- Padma Vasanthi
- Tennis Krishna
- Master Anand
- Dharma
- Harish Roy

== Reception ==
=== Critical response ===
R. G. Vijayasarathy of Rediff.com describes the film as lackluster. He criticizes the film's poor script, technical staff, and music. However, he praised the performances of the actors. The Times of India generally agreed, describing the film as lacking creativity. However, the Times found the music and technical work to be acceptable. The Times also praised the performance of the actors. On the contrary, a critic from Indiaglitz rated the film seven out of ten and wrote that "Go watch this Road Romeo. It is worth your ticket value".
