= Rajadhi Raja (1992 film) =

Rajadhiraja
- Directed by: H. R. Bhargava
- Written by: B. L. Venu
- Screenplay by: H. R. Bhargava
- Story by: N. T. Jayarama Reddy
- Produced by: Sri Vaishnavi Internationals
- Starring: Vishnuvardhan; Rupini; K. S. Ashwath; Shivaram
- Cinematography: D V Rajaram
- Edited by: Victor Yadav
- Music by: Vijayanand
- Production company: Sri Vaishnavi Internationals
- Distributed by: Sri Vaishnavi Internationals
- Release date: 18 March 1992
- Running time: 142 min
- Country: India
- Language: Kannada

Rajadhiraja (Kannada: ರಾಜಾಧಿರಾಜ) is a 1992 Indian Kannada film, directed by H. R. Bhargava and produced by Sri Vaishnavi Internationals. The film stars Vishnuvardhan, Rupini, K. S. Ashwath and Shivaram in lead roles. The film had musical score by Vijayanand.

== Cast ==
- Vishnuvardhan
- Rupini
- K. S. Ashwath
- Pandari Bai
- Soundarya
- Ramesh Bhat
- Shivaram
- Rajanand
- Vajramuni
- Mukhyamantri Chandru
- Sudheer
- Bhavyashree Rai
- Shobha Raghavendra

== Music ==
The music was composed by Vijayanand.

- "Ninnalliro Anda" – S. P. Balasubrahmanyam, K. S. Chithra
- "Daba Daba" – S. P. Balasubrahmanyam, K. S. Chithra
- "Baa Priya Daamini" – S. P. Balasubrahmanyam
- "Rajadhiraja" – S. P. Balasubrahmanyam
- " Sambhanda Churaagi" – S. P. Balasubrahmanyam
- "Yerida Gunginalli" – Manjula Gururaj
