= Mana Mecchida Sose =

- Directed by: B. Ramamurthy
- Written by: Ilavarasan
- Screenplay by: B. Ramamurthy
- Produced by: Kumaresh Babu; Bhadravathi Govindu
- Starring: Abhijith; Malashri; Sunil
- Cinematography: N. Venkataratnam
- Edited by: D. Vijaykumar
- Music by: Upendra Kumar
- Production company: Golden Creations
- Release date: 19 August 1992
- Running time: 134 minutes
- Country: India
- Language: Kannada

Mana Mecchida Sose is a 1992 Indian Kannada-language romantic drama film directed by B. Ramamurthy and written by Ilavarasan. The film stars Malashri, Sunil and Abhijith. The film's music was composed by Upendra Kumar and the audio was launched on the Lahari Music banner.

This was actor P. Ravi Shankar's second movie in Kannada after his debut movie Halli Krishna Delhi Radha which had the same lead actors as this movie. The movie was a remake of 1989 Malayalam movie Chakkikotha Chankaran which itself was heavily inspired by the 1987 Tamil film Enga Veettu Ramayanam.

== Cast ==
- Malashri as Sandhya
- Sunil as Shankar
- Abhijith as Balu
- Uttara as Devi
- Dheerendra Gopal as Shankar and Balu's father
- Girija Lokesh as Padmavati
- K. S. Ashwath as Sitapathi
- Mynavathi as Savitri
- Sarigama Viji as Lakshman
- P. Ravi Shankar as Diwakar, a stalker
- Shani Mahadevappa as fortune-teller
- Ashwath Narayan

== Soundtrack ==
The music of the film was composed by Upendra Kumar with lyrics by Chi. Udaya Shankar.

Track listing
No.	Title	Lyrics	Singer(s)	Length
1.	"Beda Raja Sankocha"	Chi. Udaya Shankar	Manjula Gururaj
2.	"Chandada Gini"	Chi. Udaya Shankar	S. P. Balasubrahmanyam, Sangeetha Katti
3.	"Naane Haadide"	Chi. Udaya Shankar	S. P. Balasubrahmanyam, Sangeetha Katti
4.	"Neene Swarada Shrungara"	Chi. Udaya Shankar	S. P. Balasubrahmanyam
