= Baa Nanna Preethisu =

- Directed by: Siddalingaiah
- Written by: B. A. Madhu
- Screenplay by: Siddalingaiah
- Produced by: Siddalingaiah
- Starring: Shashikumar; Soundarya; Madhuri; Aravind
- Cinematography: B. S. Basavaraj
- Edited by: Shyam Yadav
- Music by: Rajan–Nagendra
- Production company: Vijayashree Productions
- Release date: 20 April 1992
- Country: India
- Language: Kannada

Baa Nanna Preethisu (Kannada: ಬಾ ನನ್ನ ಪ್ರೀತಿಸು) is a 1992 Indian Kannada film, directed and produced by Siddalingaiah. The film stars Shashikumar, Soundarya, Madhuri, and Aravind in the lead roles. The film's musical score was composed by Rajan–Nagendra.

== Cast ==
- Shashikumar
- Soundarya
- Madhuri
- Aravind
- Rajaram
- Kalabhairava Gangadhar
- Girija Lokesh
- Lokesh
- Sanatani

== Soundtrack ==
- "Andu Ninna Kandaagale" - S. P. Balasubrahmanyam, Manjula Gururaj
- "Manadaase Nooru" - S. P. Balasubrahmanyam, Manjula Gururaj
- "Ondu Beku Eradu Saaku" - S. P. Balasubrahmanyam, Manjula Gururaj
- "Baaro Baaro Maleraaya" - S. P. Balasubrahmanyam
- "Kempegowdre" - S. P. Balasubrahmanyam
