= Common Man (film) =

- Directed by: Om Sai Prakash
- Written by: N. Narasimha Murthy
- Screenplay by: Om Sai Prakash
- Story by: N. Narasimha Murthy
- Produced by: N. Narasimha Murthy
- Starring: Gowrishankar SRG; Shona Ladwa; Sabby Suri; N. Narasimha Murthy; Ramesh Bhat
- Cinematography: J. G. Krishna; Deepak Kumar J. K.
- Edited by: M. Muniraju
- Music by: Vinay Chandra
- Production company: Surabhi Films
- Release date: 25 September 2026
- Country: India
- Language: Kannada

Common Man is a 2026 Indian Kannada-language political drama film directed by Om Sai Prakash.

== Plot ==
The film follows Kumar Kamsale, an advocate who becomes involved in addressing problems affecting ordinary citizens. After unexpectedly becoming Chief Minister, he attempts to bring changes to the political system. His efforts bring him into conflict with political opponents and powerful interests. The story explores corruption, governance and the relationship between political leadership and the public.

== Cast ==
- Gowrishankar SRG as Kumar Kamsale
- Shona Ladwa
- Sabby Suri
- N. Narasimha Murthy
- Ramesh Bhat
- Ashok
- Bala Rajwadi
- Prakash Thuminad
- P. D. Satish Chandra
- Nagendra Urs
- Ganesh Rao Kesarkar

== Production ==
The film was directed by Om Sai Prakash, marking his 106th directorial venture. N. Narasimha Murthy wrote the story and produced the film under the Surabhi Films banner. Om Sai Prakash also handled the screenplay.

== Release ==
The film was released theatrically on 25 September 2026.

== Reception ==
The Times of India rated the film 2 out of 5 stars, describing it as a socially relevant story dealing with corruption and political issues. TV9 Kannada rated the film 3 out of 5 stars. Cinema Express and Bangalore Mirror also published reviews of the film, discussing its political subject, performances and screenplay.
