= Maruthu Pandi =

- Poster
- Directed by: Manoj Kumar
- Written by: R. P. Viswam (dialogues)
- Screenplay by: Manoj Kumar
- Story by: Su. Thirunavukkarasar
- Produced by: S. Selvarethinam
- Starring: Ramki; Seetha; Nirosha
- Cinematography: R. H. Ashok
- Edited by: B. Krishnakumar; Srinivas
- Music by: Ilaiyaraaja
- Production company: Ponmanam Films
- Release date: 27 April 1990
- Running time: 130 minutes
- Country: India
- Language: Tamil

Maruthu Pandi is a 1990 Indian Tamil language action drama film directed by Manoj Kumar. The film stars Ramki, Seetha and Nirosha, with Nassar, S. S. Chandran, Senthil, Kovai Sarala, Raghavi and Pradeep Shakthi playing supporting roles. It was released on 27 April 1990 and became a major box office success. The film was remade in Kannada as Kollur Kala (1991) and in Hindi as Aag (1994).

== Plot ==
In the village Ammapatti, Maruthu Pandi is a coracle operator in the day and the village protector at night. The villagers give him food in exchange for his work. Maruthu Pandi has a mentally ill sister Lakshmi who is pregnant and he takes care of Lakshmi like a mother. Kanagavalli is a dancer performing in a dance troupe. After performing their dance in Ammapatti, the dancers leave Kanagavalli alone. The villagers help Kanagavalli to stay in the village : they build a house for her. Kanagavalli slowly falls in love with Maruthu Pandi. Kanagavalli is, in fact, a police officer who wants to arrest Maruthu Pandi. Maruthu Pandi's real name is Manickam.

In the past, Manickam was a poor tailor, where he lived happily with his only sister. Manickam was in love with Kavitha, daughter of a rich zamindar. Her father Jagannathan refuses to let his daughter marry Manickam; instead he wants to get her married to a zamindar like him : Inspector of Police Thiagarajan. On the day of the wedding, Kavitha drinks poison and dies. That same night, Jagannathan, Thiagarajan and Thiagarajan's friend Pradeep beat up Manickam and abduct Lakshmi and she is brutally raped by Thiagarajan. Manickam manages to beat up them while Jagannathan, Kavitha's father is killed in the process and Lakshmi becomes mentally unstable. He flees the village with his sister from that village.

Thiagarajan and his police team come to Ammapatti to arrest Manickam. What transpires later forms the crux of the story.

== Cast ==
- Ramki as Maruthu Pandi / Manickam
- Seetha as Kanagavalli
- Nirosha as Kavitha
- Nassar as Thiagarajan
- S. S. Chandran as Nattamai
- Senthil
- K. Samarasam
- Kovai Sarala
- Raghavi as Lakshmi
- Pradeep Shakthi as Pradeep
- Singamuthu
- Theni Kunjarammal
- Srilekha
- K. Kannan as Vellaisamy
- Mohan Babu
- Veera Raghavan
- K. K. Soundar
- Senji Krishnan
- MLA Malliah
- Joker Thulasi
- Pasi Narayanan
- Balambika

== Production ==
The film was originally offered to Sathyaraj who refused it.

== Soundtrack ==
The soundtrack was composed by Ilaiyaraaja.

| Song | Singer(s) | Lyricist | Duration |
|---|---|---|---|
| "Adhamum Yevalum" | Arunmozhi, S. Janaki | Piraisoodan | 4:43 |
| "Amma Pattiyil Adicha" | S. Janaki | Vaali | 4:23 |
| "Paadi Paadi" | Malaysia Vasudevan | Pulamaipithan | 4:51 |
| "Pombala Illama" | Mano, S. Janaki | Gangai Amaran | 4:39 |
| "Singara Selvangale" | Ilaiyaraaja | Na. Kamarasan | 4:16 |

== Reception ==
P. S. S. of Kalki wrote that the director managed to narrate a gripping screenplay out of an age old plot.
