= Udhaar Ki Zindagi =

- Theatrical release poster
- Directed by: K. V. Raju
- Written by: K.V. Raju
- Produced by: Rajesh Misra; S.S Misra
- Starring: Jeetendra; Moushumi Chatterjee; Kajol
- Cinematography: S. Naidu
- Edited by: S. Heera
- Music by: Anand–Milind
- Production company: Asht Murti Film Combines
- Release date: 4 November 1994
- Running time: 162 minutes
- Country: India
- Language: Hindi
- Budget: ₹1.35 crore
- Box office: ₹1.73 crore

Udhaar Ki Zindagi (transl. Life of Debt) is a 1994 Indian Hindi-language drama film, produced by Rajesh Mishra, S.S. Misra under the Asht Murti Film Combines banner and directed by K. V. Raju. It stars Jeetendra, Moushumi Chatterjee and Kajol, with music composed by Anand–Milind. It is a remake of 1991 Telugu film Seetharamayya Gari Manavaralu which the director of this film, K.V. Raju, had earlier remade in Kannada in 1992 as Belli Modagalu.

== Plot ==
Sitaram runs his family in an authoritarian manner. He has planned the marriage of his son, Vasudev, only to be told that Vasudev loves another woman, Suman, whom he plans to marry. Sitaram tells his son to forget about his love and marry the woman he has chosen for him. Vasudev marries Suman and brings her home to introduce her to his family. While the rest of the family welcome Suman, Sitaram makes it clear that she is not welcome. Shortly thereafter Vasudev and Suman leave the household and relocate to the U.S. Several years later, Sitaram receives a letter informing him that Vasudev and his family will visit them in India. Sitaram looks forward to seeing his son and his family after all these years. He is enraged when he finds that the only one sent to visit him is Sita, his granddaughter, and the excuse for Vasudev and Suman not attending is that "they are busy". Old wounds resurface and Sitaram will have nothing to do with his granddaughter, who has brought a special gift from her father for her grandfather. However, Sitaram refuses to accept this gift unless his son himself gives it to him, and it is then that he realizes the reason for his son's absence. It is later revealed that his son and daughter in law were killed and their last wish was to send their daughter to meet her grandparents and share the reason behind her visit.

== Cast ==
- Jeetendra as Seetaram
- Moushumi Chatterjee as Janki
- Kajol as Seeta
- Rohit bhatia as Kashi
- Sujata Mehta as Gauri
- Tinnu Anand as Arjun's father
- Ravi Kishan as Vasu
- Shiva Rindani as Arjun
- Mehmood as Radhe
- Raghuveer Yadav as Suraj

== Production ==
Udhaar Ki Zindagi was an official remake of the Telugu-language drama film Seetharamayya gari Manavaralu (1991), which starring Akkineni Nageswara Rao, Meena and Rohini Hattangadi. It was previously titled Kaagaz Ki Gudia. According to Deccan Herald's journalist Piali Banerjee, the film was shot in Hyderabad.

== Soundtrack ==
Anand–Milind composed the soundtrack. The songs were authored by Sameer. "Thodi Hansi Hain" was widely appreciated for its lyrics.

#	Title	Singer(s)
1.	"Dadaji Ki Chhadi Hoon Main"	Poornima
2.	"Dil Dhadakne Ka Bahaana"	Kumar Sanu, Alka Yagnik
3.	"Humne Toh Li Hai Kasam"	Kumar Sanu, Alka Yagnik
4.	"Main Bhi Chup Hoon"	Kumar Sanu, Sadhana Sargam
5.	"Rang Daalo Pheko Gulaal"	Udit Narayan, Poornima
6.	"Thodi Hasi Hai Toh Thode Aansu"	Udit Narayan, Suresh Wadkar, Kavita Krishnamurthy
7.	"Thodi Hasi Hai Toh Thode Aansu"-2	Suresh Wadkar, Sadhana Sargam
