= Kaliyuga Bheema =

- Directed by: Tiger Prabhakar
- Written by: K. S. Sathyanarayana
- Screenplay by: Tiger Prabhakar
- Produced by: N. Ravikumar; H. N. Ramachandra Hande
- Starring: Tiger Prabhakar; Khushbu; Sumalatha; Srinath
- Cinematography: K. Sundarnath Suvarna
- Edited by: Victor Yadav
- Music by: Hamsalekha
- Production company: Shilapkala Pictures
- Release date: 16 August 1991
- Country: India
- Language: Kannada

Kaliyuga Bheema is a 1991 Indian Kannada film, directed by Tiger Prabhakar and produced by N. Ravikumar and H. N. Ramachandra Hande. The film stars Tiger Prabhakar, Khushbu, Sumalatha and Srinath in the lead roles. The film has musical score by Hamsalekha.

== Cast ==
- Tiger Prabhakar as Rajasekhar Gonsalves Mohammad Ali aka Raja
- Khushbu
- Sumalatha as Nirmala Devi
- Srinath
- Jai Jagadish
- Pandari Bai
- Baby Arpitha
- Master Vinay
- Vajramuni as Baladeva Raj
- Sudarshan as Khan
- Sudheer as Pinto/Sikander
- Doddanna
- Vishwa Vijetha
- Sundar Krishna Urs
- Dheerendra Gopal
- Rajanand
- Mysore Lokesh
- Sadashiva Brahmavar
- Sarigama Viji
- Negro Johnny
- Circus Boranna
- Go Ra Bheema Rao
- Srishailan

== Music ==
Kaliyuga Bheema

Soundtrack album by Hamsalekha
- Released: 1991
- Genre: Feature film soundtrack
- Label: Lahari Music

The songs had its lyrics written and composed by Hamsalekha.

- Mother India - SPB
- Shaari Shaari Enuthare – Latha Hamsalekha
- Bheeme Gowda Ninthidda - SPB, Manjula Gururaj
- Kai Thutthu Kottole - SPB
- Chandamama - SPB, B. R. Chaya, Manjula Gururaj
- Bhoomigintha Bhaara – Swarnalatha
