= Om Sai Prakash =

Film director and producer

- Born: Prakash Reddy; Phirangipuram, Guntur district, Andhra Pradesh
- Occupations: Writer, Director, Producer
- Years active: 1988-present

Enreddy Prakash Reddy, known by his stage name Om Sai Prakash, is a Kannada and Telugu film director and producer.

== Early life ==
Born in Phirangipuram, in Guntur district, Andhra Pradesh, Om Sai Prakash moved to Chennai to pursue a career in filmmaking. He began his career as an assistant to Kodi Ramakrishna before becoming a director.

== Career ==
While working in Telugu cinema, Prakash was encouraged by actor Vishnuvardhan to move to Bengaluru and direct Kannada films. He made his Kannada directorial debut with Sahasa Veera (1988). His Kannada films include Anna Thangi, Kitturina Huli, Thavarige Baa Thangi and Golmaal Radhakrishna. He has also directed Telugu films, including Maa Inti Aadapoduchu, Amma Leni Puttillu, Kodalu Diddina Kaapuram, Khaidi Garu, Amma Durgamma, Amma Nagamma, Pelli Aadu Choopista and Naga Devatha.

In a 2026 he described his career as spanning more than 40 years in Kannada and Telugu cinema. Common Man (2026) was his 106th directorial film and marked his return to direction after a six-year break.

== Personal life ==
He is married to Ms Rajamma. His son Sai Krishna Enreddy works as a publicity designer, actor and a director.

== Filmography ==
=== Director ===
Year	Film	Language	Notes			
Year	Film	Language	Notes	1988	Sahasa Veera	Kannada
1989	Mutthinantha Manushya					Kannada
1989	Thaayi Gobba Tharle Maga					Kannada
1989	Manmatha Raja					Kannada
1989	Narasimha					Kannada
1990	Challenge Gopalakrishna					Kannada
1990	Swarna Samsara					Kannada
1990	Policena Hendthi	Remake of Telugu film Police Bharya				Kannada
1990	Golmaal Radhakrishna	Remake of Telugu film Chalaki Mogudu Chadastapu Pellam				Kannada
1990	Bhale Chathura	Remake of Telugu film Attaku Yamudu Ammayiki Mogudu				Kannada
1991	Golmaal Radhakrishna 2					Kannada
1991	Kalla Malla	Remake of Hindi film Baap Numbri Beta Dus Numbri				Kannada
1991	Gruha Pravesa	Remake of Telugu film Gruha Pravesam				Kannada
1991	Kitturina Huli	Also producer				Kannada
1991	Lion Jagapathi Rao					Kannada
1991	Rowdy & MLA	Remake of Tamil film Velai Kidaichuduchu				Kannada
1991	Kollur Kala					Kannada
1991	Maneli Ili Beedhili Huli	Remake of Tamil film Veetla Eli Veliyila Puli				Kannada
1991	Readymade Ganda					Kannada
1991	Thavarumane Udugore					Kannada
1992	Chikkejamanru	Remake of Tamil film Chinna Gounder				Kannada
1992	Malashree Mamashree					Kannada
1992	Nagaradalli Nayakaru	Remake of Malayalam film In Harihar Nagar				Kannada
1992	Sahasi	Also made a guest appearance				Kannada
1992	Solillada Saradara					Kannada
1992	Sindhoora Thilaka	Remake of Tamil film Kizhakku Vasal				Kannada
1992	Gharshane					Kannada
1992	Amara Prema					Kannada
1992	Hendtheere Hushar	Remake of Telugu film Mama Alludu				Kannada
1993	Bhagawan Sri Sai Baba	Also actor				Kannada
1993	Muddina Maava	Remake of Tamil film Naan Pudicha Mappillai				Kannada
1993	Aathanka					Kannada
1993	Dharma Peeta	Remake of Telugu film Bobbili Brahmanna				Kannada
1994	Indrana Gedda Narendra					Kannada
1994	Hettha Karulu					Kannada
1994	Sididedda Pandavaru					Kannada
1995	Gadibidi Aliya	Remake of Telugu film Allari Alludu				Kannada
1995	Ammaleni Puttillu	Telugu				
1995	Hello Sister	Kannada				
1995	Rowdy	Kannada				
1995	Revenge	Kannada				
1996	Sowbhagya Devathe	Kannada	Remake of Telugu film Aame			
1996	Maa Inti Aadapaduchu	Telugu				
1996	Muddina Sose	Kannada				
1996	Samayakondu Sullu	Kannada				
1996	Amma Durgamma	Telugu				
1996	Amma Nagamma	Telugu				
1997	Kodalu Diddina Kaapuram	Telugu				
1997	Thambulalu	Telugu				
1997	Saradala Samsaram	Telugu				
1998	Pelladi Choopista	Telugu				
1998	Gadibidi Krishna	Kannada				
1998	Khaidi Garu	Telugu	Remake of Malayalam film Kauravar			
1999	Aaha Nanna Maduveyante	Kannada				
2000	Khiladi	Kannada	Remake of Telugu film Alluda Majaka			
2000	Nagadevathe	Kannada				
2001	Rusthum	Kannada	Remake of Tamil film Pistha			
2001	Grama Devathe	Kannada				
2002	Thavarige Baa Thangi	Kannada				
2002	Dheera	Kannada	Remake of Evadra Rowdy			
2003	Mane Magalu	Kannada	Remake of Telugu film Maa Inti Aadapaduchu			
2003	Thayi Illada Thabbali	Kannada				
2004	Rowdy Aliya	Kannada				
2004	Rama Krishna	Kannada	Remake of Tamil film Aan Paavam			
2005	Anna Thangi	Kannada				
2005	Kashi From Village	Kannada	Based on Tamil film Bhagavathi			
2005	Maharaja	Kannada				
2006	Hettavara Kanasu	Kannada	Remake of Telugu film Ammayi Kapuram			
2006	Neelakanta	Kannada	Remake of Tamil film Aranmanai Kili			
2006	Odahuttidavalu	Kannada	Remake of Tamil film Porkaalam			
2006	Thavarina Siri	Kannada				
2007	Parodi	Kannada	Remake of Hindi film Krantiveer			
2007	Ugadi	Kannada	Remake of Telugu film Santhosham			
2007	Road Romeo	Kannada				
2007	Hetthare Henanne Herabeku	Kannada	Remake of Telugu film Kante Koothurne Kanu			
2007	Lava Kusha	Kannada				
2008	Navashakthi Vaibhava	Kannada				
2008	Citizen	Kannada				
2009	Bhagyada Balegara	Kannada				
2009	Devaru Kotta Thangi	Kannada				
2011	Sri Naga Shakthi	Kannada				
2012	Samsaradalli Golmaal	Kannada	Remake of Telugu film Aadivaram Adavallaku Selavu			
2012	Sri Kshetra Adichunchanagiri	Kannada				
2012	Nandeesha	Kannada	Remake of Malayalam film Thilakkam			
2013	Gharbada Gudi	Kannada				
2015	Ganga	Kannada				
2015	Sri Sai	Kannada				
2015	Mana Mechida Bangaru	Kannada				
2016	Sri Omkara Ayyappane	Kannada				
2017	Real Police	Kannada				
2017	Yudha Kanda	Kannada				
2018	Kranthiyogi Mahadevaru	Kannada				
2020	Jaggi Jagannadha	Kannada				
2026	Common Man	Kannada	Post-production			

=== Actor ===
- Bhagwan Sri Sai Baba (1993)
- Sri Sai Mahima (2000) (Telugu)
- Hey Nan Bheeshma Kano (2003)
- Ramakrishna (2004)
