= Halli Krishna Delhi Radha =

Indian Kannada-language romance film

- Directed by: P. V. Raju
- Written by: Fazil (Remake of Ennennum Kannettante (1986))
- Produced by: A Narasimha Reddy; M Mahendra Reddy
- Starring: Malashri; Sunil
- Cinematography: Babji
- Edited by: Thiruvavukkarasu
- Music by: Rajan-Nagendra
- Production company: Sri Venkatalakshmi Productions
- Release date: 10 August 1992
- Running time: 148 mins
- Country: India
- Language: Kannada

Halli Krishna Delhi Radha is a 1992 Kannada-language, romance film directed by P. V. Raju. The film is a remake of Fazil's Tamil film Varusham 16 (1989), which itself was based on his Malayalam film Ennennum Kannettante (1986). It stars Sunil and Malashri in lead roles along with K. S. Ashwath, Vajramuni and Mysore Lokesh in supporting roles. The music is composed by Rajan-Nagendra. This was actor P. Ravi Shankar's debut movie in Kannada.

== Plot ==
Krishna comes to his ancestral house with his mother to spend vacation and to attend the festival in their family temple. There are his relatives, like grandfather, grandmother, head of the family and his aunt and her children. Everybody likes Krishna very much, and he has a good time along with his friend Gopi.

But with the arrival of his uncle's daughter Radha from Delhi after a gap of nine years to perform her dance debut (Arangetram) in the temple, everyone's attention turns to her. Krishna initially felt sad and angry but, once he sees Radha, immediately falls in love with her. Krishna and Rada were childhood friends and both have memories of their childhood. Radha also likes Krishna, but was afraid to reveal it to Kannan. To know whether Radha loves him, Kannan plans to ask her secretly and hides himself in the bathroom. Radha sees him and cries aloud. The whole family learns of the incident, and Krishna was blamed by all, including his mother. She send a message to Krishna's father to take him back to village for his exams. Meanwhile, Radha reveal to Kannan that she loves him as much as he loves her. Soon, Krishna's father take him back to the city.

After finishing the exams, Krishna rushed back to the village to meet Radha, but she had already gone to the railway station to return to Delhi and then to the United States with her parents. Krishna rushed to the station. As he reached there, the train had already left and he couldn't meet Radha one last time, even though he chased her train. Radha had left a souvenir for him on the platform, but the heartbroken Krishna didn't see it.

== Cast ==
- Sunil as Krishna
- Malashri as Radha
- K. S. Ashwath as Moorthy
- Vajramuni
- Mysore Lokesh
- B. K. Shankar
- Honnavalli Krishna
- Ravishankar
- Bank Janardhan
- Hema Chaudhary
- Annapurna
- Ashalatha
- Chethan Ramarao
- Adugodi Srinivas
- Master Anand
- Master Dayanand
- Nandakumar
- Madhusudhan
- Baby Divya

== Production ==
This film marked the Kannada debut of Ravishankar and his first scene was with Vajramuni.

== Soundtrack ==
Halli Krishna Delhi Radha

Film score by Rajan-Nagendra
- Released: 1992
- Genre: Soundtrack
- Length: 20:46
- Producer: Rajan-Nagendra

Music composed by Rajan-Nagendra.

S. No.	Song title	Lyrics	Singers	length
1	"Beke Idu Beke"	Chi. Udayashankar	S. P. Balasubrahmanyam, K. S. Chithra	4:54
2	"Mutthinda Mattheritu"	Chi. Udayashankar	S. P. Balasubrahmanyam, K. S. Chithra	4:44
3	"Ayyo Ayyo Krishna"	Chi. Udayashankar	S. P. Balasubrahmanyam, K. S. Chithra	3:34
4	"Preethiyinda Nodu"	Chi. Udayashankar	S. P. Balasubrahmanyam	3:55
5	"Aadidano Ranga"	Chi. Udayashankar	S. P. Balasubrahmanyam	4.05
