= Nagaradalli Nayakaru =

- Directed by: Om Sai Prakash
- Written by: Kunigal Nagabhushan Dialogues
- Screenplay by: Om Saiprakash
- Story by: Siddique-Lal
- Produced by: S. M. Venkatesh; Y. Raghubabu
- Starring: Malashree; Sunil
- Cinematography: Johny Lal
- Edited by: K. Narasaiah
- Music by: Raj–Koti
- Production company: New Dynamic Movie Makers
- Release date: 5 November 1992
- Running time: 122 min
- Country: India
- Language: Kannada

Nagaradalli Nayakaru is an Indian comedy thriller film in the Kannada language and was first released in 1992. It was directed by Om Sai Prakash and written by the screenwriter duo Siddique-Lal. The film is about four guys trying to woo a girl, who moved to another city with her grandparents in order to find out who murdered her brother.

The film is a remake of the popular Malayalam film In Harihar Nagar (1990).

== Cast ==
- Malashri as Maya
- Sunil as Ramu
- Chi. Guru Dutt as Bheemu
- Balaraj as Dhamu
- Sudhakar as Kaamu
- Tara
- Mukhyamantri Chandru
- Jai Jagadish as Sharath
- Rambo Rocky as John Robert
- Rathasapthami Aravind
- Sridhar as Anand
- M.S. Umesh
- Sathyabhama
- Ananthrao Maccheri
- Pailwaan Venu
- K. D. Venkatesh
- Rocket Vikram
- Bank Suresh
- Guru Murthy

== Soundtrack ==
No.	Song title	Singers	Lyrics
1	"Ninna Athhe Maga"	Mano	R. N. Jayagopal
2	"Oh Priyathama"	S. P. Balasubrahmanyam, K. S. Chitra	R. N. Jayagopal
3	"My Darling Sweety"	S. P. Balasubrahmanyam, K. S. Chitra	R. N. Jayagopal
4	"Bengalooru Sampige"	Mano	R. N. Jayagopal
