= Vajrayudha (film) =

- Directed by: B. Ramamurthy
- Screenplay by: B. Ramamurthy; Veerappa Maralavadi
- Produced by: S. R. Rajeshwari
- Starring: Ramesh Aravind; Malashri; Ananth Nag
- Cinematography: V. K. Kannan
- Edited by: S. Manohar
- Music by: Hamsalekha
- Production company: Samruddha Enterprises
- Release date: 1992
- Running time: 149 minutes
- Country: India
- Language: Kannada

Vajrayudha (Kannada: ವಜ್ರಾಯುಧ) is a 1992 Indian Kannada language action film directed by B. Ramamurthy and produced by S. R. Rajeshwari. The film stars Ramesh Aravind, Ananth Nag and Malashri. The film's music is composed by Hamsalekha.

== Cast ==
- Ramesh Aravind
- Ananth Nag
- Malashri
- Tara
- Doddanna
- Mysore Lokesh
- M. S. Umesh
- Tennis Krishna

== Soundtrack ==
Vajrayudha

Soundtrack album by Hamsalekha
- Genre: Feature film soundtrack
- Label: Lahari Music

Hamsalekha composed the background score the film and the soundtracks and penning the lyrics for the soundtracks. The album has four soundtracks.

Tracklist
No.	Title	Lyrics	Singer(s)	Length
1.	"Tooru Tooru"	Hamsalekha	S. P. Balasubrahmanyam, K. S. Chithra	4:42
2.	"Mohini Mohini"	Hamsalekha	K. S. Chithra	4:46
3.	"Collegina Kanasina Rani"	Hamsalekha	S. P. Balasubrahmanyam, Latha Hamsalekha	4:37
4.	"Jagavuraluthide"	Hamsalekha	Manjula Gururaj	4:28
