= Sunil (Kannada actor) =

Indian film actor (1964-1994)

- Born: Sunil Shetty; 1 April 1964; Yedthady, Udupi, Karnataka, India
- Died: 24 July 1994 (aged 30)
- Occupation: Film actor
- Years active: 1987–1994

Sunil (1 April 1964 – 24 July 1994) was an Indian actor in Kannada cinema. Some of the notable films of Sunil as an actor include Shruthi (1990), Mana Mecchida Sose (1992), Belli Kalungura (1992) and Shambhavi (1992).

== Career ==
Sunil had been part of more than thirty Kannada feature films and was paired with Malashri in many films. He first acted as her brother in the film Mangalya (1991).

== Death ==
In 1994, actress Malashri, Sunil, and his aunt's son, Sachin, met with a car accident when their car on route from Hospet to Bengaluru was hit by a truck. While Malashri and Sachin suffered multiple injuries, Sunil died within an hour.

== Filmography ==
- All films are in Kannada, unless otherwise noted.

Year	Title	Role	Notes
1990	Shruthi	Krishna	
1991	C. B. I. Shiva	Indudhar	
1991	Nagunagutha Nali		
1991	Thavarumane Udugore	Gopi	
1991	Anatha Rakshaka	Krishna	
1991	Mangalya	Anand	
1991	Amma Kadupu Challaga	Balayya	Telugu film
1992	Halli Krishna Delhi Radha	Krishna	
1992	Obbarigintha Obbaru	Ramu	
1992	Malashree Mamashree	Anand	
1992	Mana Mecchida Sose	Shankar	
1992	Snehada Kadalalli	Sunny	
1992	Belli Kalungura	Krishna	
1992	Nagaradalli Nayakaru	Ramu	
1992	Sindhoora Thilaka	Ranga	
1992	Sahasi	Vijay	
1992	Marana Mrudanga	Anil / Nithyanand	
1992	Kaliyuga Seethe	Inspector Anand	
1992	Shambhavi	Dr. Suresh	
1992	Thevar Veettu Ponnu	Dr. Suresh	Tamil film
1993	Urmila	Chandru	Telugu film
1993	Dakshayini	Shankar	
1993	Mecchida Madumaga	Sampath	
1994	September 8		Tulu film
1994	Panjarada Gili	Raja	Posthumous release
1996	Nadasurabhi	Murali	Shot in 1987; posthumous release
1998	Bisi Raktha	Arun	Shot in 1989; posthumous release

== See also ==
- List of people from Karnataka
- Cinema of Karnataka
- List of Indian film actors
- Cinema of India
