= Varusham 16 =

1989 film directed by Fazil

- Theatrical release poster
- Directed by: Fazil
- Written by: Gokula Krishnan (dialogues)
- Screenplay by: Fazil
- Story by: Madhu Muttam
- Produced by: Ousepachan Vaalakuzhy; Fazil
- Starring: Karthik; Khushbu
- Cinematography: Anandakuttan
- Edited by: T. R. Sekar
- Music by: Ilaiyaraaja
- Production company: Ganga Chithra Productions
- Release date: 18 February 1989
- Country: India
- Language: Tamil

Varusham 16 (read as "Varusham Padhinaaru"; transl. Year 16) is a 1989 Indian Tamil-language romantic drama film, directed by Fazil. The film stars Karthik and Khushbu in the lead roles, with Sukumari, V. K. Ramasamy, Janagaraj, Charle and Vadivukkarasi in supporting roles. It is a remake of Fazil's own Malayalam film Ennennum Kannettante. The film was released on 18 February 1989, and Karthik won the Filmfare Award for Best Actor – Tamil.The film was major commercial success and ran over 200 days in Chennai and Madurai and 100 days at 15 centres.

== Plot ==
The story deals with an immature teenage love story between Kannan and Radhika who are cousins (marriage within cross-cousins is common in India). The annual festival for the village deity is conducted by the patriarch with pomp.

Kannan is the apple of the large joint family's eye and is spoiled by all. His cross-cousin Radhika comes to join the family for the village festival and suddenly, Kannan's position is usurped. He first antagonises and humiliates her going so far as to hide in her bathroom while she goes to take bath which backfires with him becoming hated in the household and being thrown out of the house forcing him to stay with his friends. Radhika apologises for exposing him in his bathroom stunt revealing that she is in love with him since childhood and came here explicitly to see him. Their love blossoms much to the ire of Radhika's paternal grandmother who has other plans for her, to get her married to her US-based cross-cousin, Moorthy, and settle there. Moorthy comes to the village with 4 of his friends and are made to stay in the outhouse where they spend time drinking, smoking, and dancing. Radhika's paternal grandmother proudly says that Moorthy is very good in hunting as Moorthy shoots a goat in front of everyone in the house. Once during a conflict, Moorthy pushes Kannan's grandfather, which leads to Kannan thrashing Moorthy and his friends. Kannan's grandfather gets angry and sends Kannan out of the house. Moorthy vows to kill Kannan later. On the day of the festival, Kannan sings and Radhika dances as planned. Moorthy and his friends try to collapse the celebration but are blocked by Kannan's family and friends. Unable to attack Kannan directly, Moorthy runs home to bring his gun. Seeing Moorthy with his gun, Kannan tries to block him and both involve in a fight. After the dance and the pooja, Radhika comes running to save Kannan, but Moorthy pushes her near Kannan's feet. As he aims to shoot Kannan, Radhika stands and gets the bullet. Seeing this, Moorthy flees and an enraged Kannan runs after him and ends up killing him. He stands with blood stains in front of his mother. Kannan who goes to prison comes out after 16 years, and is taken to the big house in the village where his grandparents and eveyone lived. His grandfather had given him his mantle symbolizing that Kannan will be the next elder person in the house. He wears the mantle and tells his brother Rajamani that everyone should gather in the house (which is now full of dirt and dust) and that the temple festival should be held every year moving forward. The film ends by Kannan lifting a small goat kid which Rajamani had bought for him as a memory of Kannan's family.

== Cast ==
- Karthik as Kannan
- Khushbu as Radhika
- V. K. Ramasamy as Sundaramoorthy
- Poornam Viswanathan as Ramamoorthy
- Janagaraj as Rajamani
- Charle as Narayana
- Tinku as Tabu
- Baby Shalini
- Vijay Menon as Moorthy
- Sukumari as Parvathi
- Vadivukkarasi as Maheshwari
- Jayabharathi as Sundari

== Production ==
Varusham 16 is a remake of director Fazil's own Malayalam film Ennennum Kannettante. The role of the lead actress was offered to Nirosha; due to her clash of dates, the director choose to cast Khushbu. According to Khushbu, the song "Poo Pookum" was shot at a studio in Porur, Madras. The filming was primarily held at Padmanabhapuram Palace, Kanyakumari. The song "Pazhamuthircholai" was shot at Mathur Aqueduct, Kanyakumari.

== Soundtrack ==
The music was composed by Ilaiyaraaja, with lyrics by Vaali. The song "Gangai Karai Mannanadi" is set in Todi, a Hindustani raga, "Hey Aiyasamy" is set in Dharmavati, a Carnatic raga, "Karayatha Manamum" is set to Hema Bhushani, "Pazhamuthir Cholai" is set in Harikambhoji, and "Poo Pookum Masam" is set in Keeravani. For the Telugu-dubbed version Premanjali, all lyrics were written by Rajasri.

Tamil track list
No.	Title	Singer(s)	Length
1.	"Pazhamuthir Cholai"	K. J. Yesudas	4:36
2.	"Hey Ayyaasaamy"	S. P. Balasubrahmanyam, K. S. Chithra	4:31
3.	"Poo Pookum Maasam"	P. Susheela	4:45
4.	"Gangai Karai Mannanadi"	K. J. Yesudas	5:40
5.	"Karaiyaatha Manamum"	K. J. Yesudas, K. S. Chithra	4:29
Total length:			24:01

Telugu track list (Premanjali)
No.	Title	Singer(s)	Length
1.	"Brundaavaname Naakosame"	S. P. Balasubrahmanyam	4:31
2.	"Hey Chitti Naannaa"	S. P. Balasubrahmanyam, P. Susheela	4:29
3.	"Koothaku Vacchenu"	P. Susheela	4:34
4.	"Raagaale Paadedhane"	S. P. Balasubrahmanyam	4:11
Total length:			17:45

== Release and reception ==
Varusham 16 was released on 18 February 1989. N. Krishnaswamy of The Indian Express wrote that Karthik "puts much life and energy into his role", Khushbu "looks just out of school" and Viswanathan was "great as the head of the family", while also appreciating Jayabharathi, Vadivukkarasi and Charle's performances. P. S. S. of Kalki said the film could be watched for the cast performances but not the drama. Karthik won the Filmfare Award for Best Actor – Tamil, and Fazil won the Cinema Express Award for Best Director. Sekar was awarded the Tamil Nadu State Film Award for Best Editor.

== Bibliography ==
- Sundararaman (2007) [2005]. Raga Chintamani: A Guide to Carnatic Ragas Through Tamil Film Music (2nd ed.). Pichhamal Chintamani. OCLC 295034757.
