= Marana Mrudanga =

- Directed by: B. Ramamurthy
- Written by: Sainath Thotapalli
- Screenplay by: Sainath Thotapalli
- Based on: Marana Mrudangam (novel by Yandamuri Veerendranath)
- Produced by: K. Chidambara Shetty
- Starring: Ramakrishna Hegde; Malashri; Sunil; Ananth Nag
- Cinematography: Mallikarjun
- Edited by: Narasaiah
- Music by: Hamsalekha
- Production company: Sri Chithra Creations
- Release date: 16 October 1992
- Running time: 141 minutes
- Country: India
- Language: Kannada

Marana Mrudanga is a 1992 Indian Kannada-language political drama film directed by B. Ramamurthy and written by Sainath Thotapalli based on the novel Marana Mrudangam by Yandamuri Veerendranath. The film stars Malashri, Sunil, Ananth Nag and Thiagarajan in lead roles. The film features former Karnataka Chief Minister, Ramakrishna Hegde in a pivotal role.

The film's music was composed by Hamsalekha and the audio was launched on the Lahari Music banner.

== Cast ==
- Malashri
- Sunil
- Ramakrishna Hegde
- Ananth Nag
- Thiagarajan
- Sadashiva Saliyan
- Nagesh Kashyap
- Sudha Narasimharaju
- Agro Chikkanna
- Nagesh Mayya
- Sundar Raj

== Soundtrack ==
The music of the film was composed and lyrics written by Hamsalekha.

Track listing
No.	Title	Lyrics	Singer(s)	Length
1.	"Rajakeeya"	Hamsalekha	C. Ashwath
2.	"Dava Dava"	Hamsalekha	S. P. Balasubrahmanyam, Manjula Gururaj
3.	"Delhiyagali Halliyagali"	Hamsalekha	S. P. Balasubrahmanyam, Manjula Gururaj
4.	"Bhoomi Aakasha"	Hamsalekha	S. P. Balasubrahmanyam, Manjula Gururaj
5.	"Ko Ko Yee Andha"	Hamsalekha	Manjula Gururaj
