= Kollur Kala =

- Directed by: Om Sai Prakash
- Screenplay by: Om Sai Prakash
- Story by: Su. Thirunavukkarasar
- Based on: Maruthu Pandi (1990)
- Produced by: M. Sheshan; K. Mohamood; D. Shivaji Rao
- Starring: Shashikumar; Malashri; Vidyashri; Umashri
- Cinematography: Johny Lal; Ravindran
- Edited by: K. Narasaiah
- Music by: Upendra Kumar
- Production company: Sri Raghavendra Cine Productions
- Release date: 29 November 1991
- Running time: 132 minutes
- Country: India
- Language: Kannada

Kollur Kala is a 1991 Indian Kannada-language action film, directed by Om Sai Prakash. The story was written by Thirunavukkarasu. The film stars Shashikumar and Malashri, with Vidyashri playing a key supporting role.

The film's music was composed by Upendra Kumar and the audio was launched under the Lahari Music banner. The film was a remake of the Tamil film Maruthu Pandi (1990).

== Cast ==
- Shashikumar
- Malashri
- Vidyashri
- Doddanna
- Umashri
- Abhinaya
- Rajeev
- Mukhyamantri Chandru
- Sihi Kahi Chandru
- M. S. Umesh
- Mysore Lokesh
- Mandeep Roy
- Aravind
- Devikarani

== Soundtrack ==
The music of the film was composed by Upendra Kumar and the lyrics were written by R. N. Jayagopal.

Track listing
No.	Title	Lyrics	Singer(s)	Length
1.	"Chinna Nanna Ninna Jodi"	R. N. Jayagopal	S. P. Balasubrahmanyam, Manjula Gururaj
2.	"Nanna Bangaradantha Thangi"	R. N. Jayagopal	S. P. Balasubrahmanyam
3.	"Ale Muttokke Bandaga"	R. N. Jayagopal	S. P. Balasubrahmanyam
4.	"Nee Hrudayadi Anuraga"	R. N. Jayagopal	S. P. Balasubrahmanyam
5.	"Hari Golu Kondu Baaro"	R. N. Jayagopal	Manjula Gururaj
6.	"Ee Maddura Hudugi"	R. N. Jayagopal	Manjula Gururaj
7.	"Nanna Bangaradantha Thangi (sad)"	R. N. Jayagopal	S. P. Balasubrahmanyam
