= Chikkejamanru =

- Directed by: Om Sai Prakash
- Written by: Kunigal Nagabhushan (dialogues)
- Story by: R. Selvaraj
- Based on: Chinna Gounder (Tamil)(1992)
- Produced by: Anam Gopalkrishna Reddy
- Starring: V. Ravichandran; Gautami; Jai Jagadish
- Cinematography: Jhonny Lal
- Edited by: K. Narasaiah
- Music by: Hamsalekha
- Production company: Sri Venkatakrishna Films
- Release date: 1992
- Running time: 140 minutes
- Country: India
- Language: Kannada

Chikkejamanru (transl. Young Landlord) is a 1992 Kannada-language drama film directed by Om Sai Prakash. The cast includes V. Ravichandran, Gautami, Jai Jagadish, Shubha and Mukhyamantri Chandru among others. The film was a remake of Tamil film Chinna Gounder.

The film featured original score and soundtrack composed and written by Hamsalekha and was produced by Anam Gopalkrishna Reddy for Sri Venkatakrishna Films banner.

== Cast ==
- V. Ravichandran as Chikkejamanru
- Gautami
- Shubha
- Jai Jagadish
- Mukhyamantri Chandru
- Shivakumar
- Tennis Krishna
- Srilalitha
- Kaminidharan
- Vijay

== Soundtrack ==
The music was composed and written by Hamsalekha.

Track listing
No.	Title	Singer(s)	Length
1.	"Rama Rama Rama"	S. P. Balasubrahmanyam, S. Janaki
2.	"Nammura Nyaya Devaru"	S. P. Balasubrahmanyam, K. S. Chithra
3.	"Buguri Buguri"	S. P. Balasubrahmanyam, K. S. Chithra
4.	"Premada Hoogara"	S. P. Balasubrahmanyam
5.	"Sobane Enniramma"	S. P. Balasubrahmanyam, S. Janaki
6.	"Rama Rama Rama (sad)"	S. P. Balasubrahmanyam, S. Janaki

== See also ==
- Chinna Gounder
- Chinarayudu
