= Snehada Kadalalli =

- Directed by: Joe Simon
- Written by: Joe Simon
- Screenplay by: Joe Simon
- Produced by: G. Govind; T. N. Venkatesh; J. G. Krishna
- Starring: Arjun Sarja; Malashri; Sunil
- Cinematography: J. G. Krishna
- Edited by: Suresh Urs
- Music by: Raj–Koti
- Production company: GVK Productions
- Release date: 4 October 1992
- Running time: 128 minutes
- Country: India
- Language: Kannada

Snehada Kadalalli is a 1992 Indian Kannada-language romance film directed by Joe Simon and produced by GVK Productions. The film stars Arjun Sarja, Malashri and Sunil. The film's title is adapted from a song from the film Shubhamangala (1975). The film was dubbed in Tamil as Meenavan.

The film's music was composed by Raj–Koti and the audio was launched on the Lahari Music banner.

== Plot ==
Ganga, a woman from a family of fishermen, is about to marry a man from their own community. However, their wedding comes under threat when she falls in love with Raja, the son of a business tycoon.

== Cast ==
- Arjun Sarja as Krishna
- Malashri as Ganga
- Sunil as Sunny
- Rockline Venkatesh as Venkatesh
- G. K. Govinda Rao as Sunny's father
- Girija Lokesh as Krishna's mother
- Rekha Das
- Joe Simon
- Shani Mahadevappa
- Navaneetha as Girija
- Lamboo Nagesh as Mohan Das

== Soundtrack ==
The music of the film was composed by Raj–Koti with lyrics by Prof.Doddarange Gowda.

Track listing
No.	Title	Lyrics	Singer(s)	Length
1.	"Maa Thaayi Ganga Maayi"	Doddarange Gowda	Mano, K. S. Chithra
2.	"Ninna Haage Kanninalli"	Doddarange Gowda	Mano, K. S. Chithra
3.	"Barpara Bhel"	Doddarange Gowda	Mano, K. S. Chithra
4.	"Jhum Jhum Endendu"	Doddarange Gowda	Mano, K. S. Chithra
5.	"Nanna Jeevana"	Doddarange Gowda	Mano, K. S. Chithra
