= Sindhoora Thilaka =

- Directed by: Om Sai Prakash
- Story by: M. S. Madhu
- Produced by: K. Satyaranayana
- Starring: Sunil; Malashri; Shruti
- Cinematography: Johny Lal
- Edited by: Narasaiah
- Music by: Upendra Kumar
- Production company: R S Arts
- Release date: 1992
- Running time: 133 minutes
- Country: India
- Language: Kannada

Sindhoora Thilaka is a 1992 Indian Kannada language film directed by Om Sai Prakash, starring Sunil and Malashri. The supporting cast features Shruti, Jaggesh and Abhijeeth. The music was composed by Upendra Kumar.

The film was a remake of the Tamil film Kizhakku Vasal directed by R. V. Udayakumar.

== Cast ==
- Sunil
- Malashri
- Shruti
- Jaggesh
- Mukhyamantri Chandru
- Abhijeeth
- Jai Jagadish
- Umashri
- Asha Rani
- Padma Kumuta
- Om Sai Prakash

== Soundtrack ==
Sindhoora Thilaka

Soundtrack album by Upendra Kumar
- Genre: Feature film soundtrack
- Label: Lahari Music

Upendra Kumar composed the film's background score and music for its six tracks. The lyrics were written by R. N. Jayagopal.

Track list
No.	Title	Lyrics	Singer(s)	Length
1.	"Suggi Bandare"	R. N. Jayagopal	S. P. Balasubrahmanyam
2.	"Sindhoora Thilaka"	R. N. Jayagopal	Sangeetha Katti
3.	"Naa Seeti Hodidare"	R. N. Jayagopal	S. P. Balasubrahmanyam
4.	"Pancharangi Giniye"	R. N. Jayagopal	S. P. Balasubrahmanyam
5.	"Sobaana Haaduve"	R. N. Jayagopal	S. P. Balasubrahmanyam
6.	"Sobaana"	R. N. Jayagopal	Chorus
