= Ravivarma (film) =

- VCD cover
- Directed by: Joe Simon
- Written by: Joe Simon
- Screenplay by: Joe Simon
- Story by: Joe Simon
- Based on: Bramma (Tamil) by K. Subash
- Produced by: Hemalatha Ramesh
- Starring: Vishnuvardhan; Bhavya; Rupini
- Cinematography: D V Rajaram
- Edited by: Suresh Urs
- Music by: Upendra Kumar
- Production company: Chinni Pavan Cine Creations
- Release date: 4 June 1992
- Running time: 156 min
- Country: India
- Language: Kannada

Ravivarma is a 1992 Indian Kannada-language film, directed by Joe Simon and produced by Hemalatha Ramesh. The film stars Vishnuvardhan, Bhavya and Rupini in lead roles. The film had musical score by Upendra Kumar. The film was a romantic drama and a remake of the 1991 Tamil movie Bramma.

== Cast ==
- Vishnuvardhan as Ravivarma
- Bhavya as Pavithra
- Rupini as Jennifer
- Mysore Lokesh
- Sundar Krishna Urs
- Ashok Rao as Dayanand
- Sudheer
- Sihi Kahi Chandru
- Shanthamma
- Ramamurthy
- Jai Jagadish
- Shivaram
- Babu Antony as George

== Soundtrack ==
All songs were composed by Upendra Kumar. The lyrics were written by Chi. Udaya Shankar and Shyamsundar Kulkarni. The soundtrack was successful upon release.

- "Nenapu Nooru Manadali" – Mano
- "Sogasu Kanna" – S. Janaki
- "Naane Bere Nanna Style Bere" – Mano
- "Ododi Hoguva"- Mano, S. Janaki
- "Ravivarma Baredanta" – Mano, S. Janaki
