= Rowdy & MLA =

1991 Kannada crime action film directed by Om Sai Prakash

- Directed by: Om Sai Prakash
- Written by: P. Vasu
- Screenplay by: Om Sai Prakash
- Based on: Velai Kidaichuduchu (1990) by P. Vasu
- Produced by: Mohan Nataraj; Tharangai Shanmugam
- Starring: Ambareesh; Malashri
- Cinematography: Johny Lal
- Edited by: K. Narasaiah
- Music by: Hamsalekha
- Production company: Sri Rajakali Amman Enterprises
- Release date: 10 September 1991
- Running time: 137 minutes
- Country: India
- Language: Kannada

Rowdy & MLA is a 1991 Indian Kannada-language crime action film directed by Om Sai Prakash who also wrote a fresh screenplay for the original story by P. Vasu. The film is a remake of the Tamil film Velai Kidaichuduchu (1990), which was directed by P. Vasu. The film stars Ambareesh and Malashri. The film's music was composed by Hamsalekha and the audio was launched on the Lahari Music banner.

== Cast ==
* Ambareesh as Shivu 

- Malashri
- Jaggesh
- Srinath
- Shubha
- Jai Jagadish
- Mukhyamantri Chandru
- Sihi Kahi Chandru
- Rambo Rocky as Kapali
- Bank Janardhan
- Mohanapriya
- Annapoorna

== Soundtrack ==
Rowdy & MLA

Soundtrack album by Hamsalekha
- Released: 31 August 1991
- Recorded: 1991
- Genre: Feature film soundtrack
- Label: Lahiri Music

Hamsalekha chronology
Shanti Kranti (1991)	Rowdy & MLA (1991)	Ramachaari (1991)

The music of the film was composed and lyrics written by Hamsalekha.

Track listing
No.	Title	Lyrics	Singer(s)	Length
1.	"Rebel Rebel"	Hamsalekha	S. P. Balasubrahmanyam, Manjula Gururaj
2.	"O India O India"	Hamsalekha	S. P. Balasubrahmanyam
3.	"Viraha Viraha"	Hamsalekha	S. P. Balasubrahmanyam, K. S. Chithra
4.	"Kolu Kolenna Kole"	Hamsalekha	S. P. Balasubrahmanyam, K. S. Chithra
