= Kizhakku Vaasal =

1990 film by R. V. Udayakumar

- Theatrical release poster
- Directed by: R. V. Udayakumar
- Screenplay by: R. V. Udayakumar
- Story by: M. S. Madhu
- Produced by: T. G. Thyagarajan; G. Saravanan
- Starring: Karthik; Revathi; Khushbu
- Cinematography: Abdul Rehman
- Edited by: Anil Malnad
- Music by: Ilaiyaraaja
- Production company: Sathya Jyothi Films
- Release date: 12 July 1990
- Country: India
- Language: Tamil

Kizhakku Vaasal (transl. East Gate) is a 1990 Indian Tamil-language romantic drama film directed and co-written by R. V. Udayakumar. The film stars Karthik, Revathi and Khushbu. It was released on 12 July 1990 and ran for over 175 days in theatres. The film was remade in Hindi as Mere Sajana Saath Nibhana, in Kannada as Sindhoora Thilaka (both 1992) and in Telugu as Chilakapachcha Kaapuram (1995).

== Plot ==
Ponnurangam is a folk singer who performs with his mini troupe in villages occasionally for festivals. He works part-time as a labourer for Vijayakumar. He has a crush on Selvi, the daughter of Valliyuran, the rich headman of a neighbouring village and the brother-in-law of Vijayakumar . Selvi looks down upon Ponnurangam and tries to pull a prank on him by asking his mother to meet her father with a wedding proposal. But Ponnurangam's mother is beaten by Valliyuran's men while she visits his house with the marriage proposal and she later dies in her sleep due to the trauma.

Thaayamma is a holy lady in the village and worshipped as a god that comes down to give them orders periodically. She leads a cloistered life and does not visit anyone. Ponnurangam befriends her and both spends more time together.

Meanwhile Selvi repents her actions and falls for Ponnurangam, but he becomes dejected with life. At the time, Vijayakumar arranges his spoilt son's (Thiyagu) marriage with Selvi to end their feud of 20 years and also to grab all of their properties through his son. Ponnurangam is asked to perform at Valliyuran's house the night before the wedding. Selvi apologises to Ponnurangam for his mother's death and gives him money which he coldly rejects. Thiyagu sees them together. There is a fight between the families and the wedding is called off. Next day, Thiyagu and his men attack Ponnurangam and stab him in the back with a poisoned knife. Thaayamma takes care of Ponnurangam and shares her story.

At past Thaayamma was an orphan and is found by Janagaraj, who is a street performer. They go from house to house begging for food. One day a lonely woman, Sulakshana, (a secret mistress of the village high man – Vijayakumar) accepts Thaayamma as her own daughter and Janagaraj as her brother, and makes them stay in her own house. After 10 years, Thaayamma attains puberty and some days later finds Sulakshana's estranged life. She and Janagaraj attempt to leave her house, but Sulakshana suddenly falls ill and this stops their exit . After Sulakshana's death, Vijaykakumar, the head of the village, tries to take advantage of Thaayamma. But Thaayamma keeps dodging him and keeps herself chaste.

Now, Ponnurangam wants to marry Thaayamma, as love developed between the two. Knowing about the love, Vijayakumar tries to thwart them by abducting Thaayamma. He kills Ponnurangam's friend Maakan (Chinni Jayanth), but he is then attacked by the angry villagers and beaten up. The last scene shows Ponnurangam and Thaayamma leaving the village and walking away together.

== Cast ==
- Karthik as Ponnurangam
- Revathi as Thaayamma
- Khushbu as Selvi
- Chinni Jayanth as Maakaan
- Manorama as Chinnathayi
- Vijayakumar as Rathnavelu Gounder
- Janagaraj as Periya Karuppu Thevar
- Shanmugasundaram as 'Valliooran' Vedhanayagam
- Thyagu as Shanmugavelu Gounder
- Sulakshana
- S. N. Parvathy as Paruvatham
- Kallapetti Singaram
- Bhavana as younger Thaayamma

== Production ==
Manobala was originally supposed to direct Kizhakku Vaasal; due to his commitments to Mera Pati Sirf Mera Hai, he could not take up this film, and was replaced by R. V. Udayakumar. The production was plagued with various problems. The set which was built for the film was burnt; storywriter M. S. Madhu suffered from fits after witnessing the fire. Actress Sulakshana was hospitalised due to nose bleeding. Udayakumar was hospitalised due to a car accident and he went into coma for a month. While recovering, he was able to complete the climax after rejecting proposals for someone else to do so.

== Soundtrack ==
Ilaiyaraaja composed the soundtrack. All the songs are set in Carnatic ragas; "Ada Veettukku" and "Pachamala Poovu" are in Sankarabharanam, "Paadi Parantha" and "Thalukki Thalukki" are in Keeravani, and "Vanthathe Oh Kungumam" is in Mohanam. "Ada Veettukku" was inspired by Wolfgang Amadeus Mozart's 25th symphony, 1st movement. For the Telugu-dubbed version Thoorupu Sindhooram, all songs were written by Sirivennela Seetharama Sastry.

Tamil
No.	Title	Lyrics	Singer(s)	Length
1.	"Ada Veettukku"	Vaali	Ilaiyaraaja	4:13
2.	"Pachamala Poovu"	R. V. Udayakumar	S. P. Balasubrahmanyam	4:26
3.	"Thalukki Thalukki"	R. V. Udayakumar	S. P. Balasubrahmanyam	5:01
4.	"Paadi Parantha"	R. V. Udayakumar	S. P. Balasubrahmanyam	4:55
5.	"Vanthathe Oh Kungumam"	R. V. Udayakumar	K. S. Chithra	4:40
Total length:				23:15

Telugu
No.	Title	Singer(s)	Length
1.	"Tala Vakita"	S. P. Balasubrahmanyam	4:15
2.	"Vacchene"	K. S. Chithra	4:44
3.	"Paccha Pacchani"	S. P. Balasubrahmanyam	4:49
4.	"Poddu Vali Poye"	S. P. Balasubrahmanyam	4:38
5.	"Thalukku"	S. P. Balasubrahmanyam	4:38
Total length:			23:04

== Release and reception ==
Kizhakku Vaasal was released on 12 July 1990. N. Krishnaswamy of The Indian Express wrote, "The film moves leisurely at a pastoral face but without boring you. Though not without a cinematic craft, it manages to retain a flavour of reality and of some human interest". P. S. S. of Kalki praised the film, saying not only is there quality in Udayakumar's screenplay, dialogue and direction; acknowledging that we will see more surprises, we seem to be welcoming the younger generation. Despite being released on the same day as Anjali, the film became a commercial success, running for over 175 days in theatres.

== Accolades ==
Tamil Nadu State Film Awards

- Best Film – G. Thyagarajan, R. V. Udayakumar (director)
- Best Actor – Karthik
- Best Actress – Revathi
- Best Cinematographer – Abdul Rahman

Cinema Express Awards

- Best Actor – Karthik
- Filmfare Award for Best Actor – Tamil

== Remakes ==
In 1992, Kizhakku Vaasal was remade in Hindi as Mere Sajana Saath Nibhana and Kannada as Sindhoora Thilaka. In 1995, it was remade in Telugu as Chilakapachcha Kaapuram, despite already having been dubbed in the language as Thoorpa Sindhooram.

== Bibliography ==
- Arunachalam, Param (2020). BollySwar: 1981–1990. Mavrix Infotech. ISBN 978-81-938482-2-7.
- Sundararaman (2007) [2005]. Raga Chintamani: A Guide to Carnatic Ragas Through Tamil Film Music (2nd ed.). Chennai: Pichhamal Chintamani. OCLC 295034757.
