= Velai Kidaichuduchu =

- Poster
- Directed by: P. Vasu
- Written by: P. Vasu
- Produced by: Mohan Natarajan
- Starring: Sathyaraj; Gautami
- Cinematography: Ravindar
- Edited by: P. Mohanraj
- Music by: Hamsalekha
- Production company: Sree Rajakaali Amman Enterprises
- Release date: 15 August 1990
- Country: India
- Language: Tamil

Velai Kidaichuduchu (transl. Got The Job) is a 1990 Indian Tamil-language crime action film written and directed by P. Vasu. The film stars Sathyaraj and Gautami. It was released on 15 August 1990. The film was remade in Telugu as Assembly Rowdy (1991), in Kannada as Rowdy & MLA (1991) and in Hindi as Loafer (1996).

== Plot ==
The film starts with Gautami visiting a village and remembering the past as the film takes us to a flashback. The village would have been a victim to a local don named Baasha whose atrocities go unchecked even by the police. Most of the policemen would either accept bribes or get killed by him. Palanisamy's family relocates to this village. He questions the riots happening in the village and develops enmity with Baasha. How Palanisamy saves the village from Baasha and his boss forms the rest of the story. In the end, Palanisamy kills Purushothaman and dies while hoisting a flag.

== Cast ==
- Sathyaraj as Palanisamy
- R. Sarathkumar as Purushothaman
- Gautami
- Vijayakumar
- Sumithra
- Anandaraj as Baasha
- Mansoor Ali Khan as Maari
- Goundamani
- Priya
- Pandu
- Poornam Viswanathan as Advocate
- Rocky as Muniyandi
- Sethu Vinayagam
- Vijay Krishnaraj
- Thilak
- Santhana Bharathi as Speaker
- Mohan V. Natarajan as Survey Officer

== Soundtrack ==
The soundtrack was composed by Hamsalekha, and lyrics were written by Vaali.

Track listing
No.	Title	Singer(s)	Length
1.	"Iyyare Iyyare"	S. P. Balasubrahmanyam, K. S. Chithra	4:58
2.	"Nooraandu Poovum"	K. S. Chithra	1:06
3.	"Vaasi Nadaswaram"	Malaysia Vasudevan, K. S. Chithra	4:52
4.	"Nenachadhum Nadandhachu"	S. P. Balasubrahmanyam, K. S. Chithra	4:59
5.	"Setthukulla"	S. P. Balasubrahmanyam, K. S. Chithra	5:00
Total length:			20:55

== Reception ==
N. Krishnaswamy of The Indian Express said, "There is nothing new in this line, but the rhetoric that accompanies this ploy in P. Vasu's Velai Kidaichuduchu is a little different".
