= Belli Modagalu =

- Directed by: K. V. Raju
- Written by: Kranti Kumar
- Produced by: G. Govinda; T. N. Venkatesh; J.G. Krishna
- Starring: Ramesh Aravind; Malashri; Doddanna; Jayanthi
- Cinematography: J.G. Krishna
- Edited by: Shyam Yadav
- Music by: Upendra Kumar
- Production company: GVK Productions
- Release date: 1992
- Running time: 119 min
- Country: India
- Language: Kannada

Belli Modagalu (transl. Silver clouds) (Kannada: ಬೆಳ್ಳಿ ಮೋಡಗಳು) is a 1992 Indian Kannada-language drama film, starring Ramesh Aravind, Malashri, Doddanna and Jayanthi in the lead roles. The film is directed by K. V. Raju. It is a remake of the Telugu film Seetharamayya gari Manavaralu which was earlier remade in Malayalam as Sandhwanam by Sibi Malayil and later remade in Hindi in 1994 as Udhaar Ki Zindagi by Raju himself.

== Cast ==
- Ramesh Aravind
- Malashri as Seetha
- Jayanthi
- Doddanna
- Thoogudeepa Srinivas
- Ramakrishna
- Avinash
- Jyothi
- Ramamurthy

== Soundtrack ==
All the songs were composed and scored by Upendra Kumar.

S. No.	Song title	Singer(s)	Lyrics
1	"Male Billa Singara"	S. Janaki, Mano	K. V. Raju
2	"Rama Baana"	Mano, Sangeetha Katti	K. V. Raju
3	"Bhoomiyali Chandirana"	S. Janaki	K. V. Raju
4	"Mavinali Hosa Thorana"	Mano, Sangeetha Katti	K. V. Raju
5	"Lokavane Thoogiruva"	Mano	K. V. Raju
6	"Hrudayave Ninna Hesarige"	Mano, S. Janaki	K. V. Raju
