= Belli Kalungura =

- Directed by: K. V. Raju
- Screenplay by: Veerappa Maralavadi
- Story by: K. V. Raju
- Produced by: Sa.Ra.Govindu
- Starring: Sunil; Malashri; Tara
- Cinematography: J.G. Krishna
- Edited by: S. Manohar
- Music by: Hamsalekha
- Production company: Thanu Chithra
- Release date: 10 January 1992
- Running time: 142 minutes
- Country: India
- Language: Kannada

Belli Kalungura (transl. Silver toe-ring) is a 1992 Indian Kannada language film directed by K. V. Raju, starring Sunil and Malashri. The supporting cast features Tara, Chi. Guru Dutt, Avinash, Doddanna, Rockline Venkatesh and Girija Lokesh. The music was composed by Hamsalekha, also writing lyrics to four of its soundtracks. The film was a success during its time and is seen as a milestone in the career of Malashri, who would go on to appear in many successful films in the 1990s.

== Cast ==
- Sunil as Krishna
- Malashri as Bhadra
- Tara as Thunga
- Chi. Guru Dutt as Nagendra
- Shivakumar as Bharama
- Avinash as Research professor
- Doddanna as Paramashivayya
- Girija Lokesh as Paramashivayya's wife
- Rockline Venkatesh
- Venki
- Lambu Nagesh as Lawyer
- K. S. Sridhar
- Ananthrao Maccheri
- Sadashiva Brahmavar as Achchappa
- Killer Venkatesh as Venkatesha, Paramashivayya's son
- Girish Rao
- Master Anand

== Production ==
The song "Kelisade Kallukallinalli" was shot at Hampi.

== Soundtrack ==
Belli Kalungura

Soundtrack album by Hamsalekha
- Genre: Feature film soundtrack
- Length: 35:16
- Label: Lahari Music

Hamsalekha composed the film's background score and music for the soundtracks, also writing its lyrics with Doddarange Gowda. The album consists of seven soundtracks. The song "Kellisade Kallukallinalli" attained popularity. The film's producer wanted Doddarange Gowda to write lyrics on a song which spoke about Kannada and he wrote the lyrics without listening to the tune and was done within 3 days.

Tracklist
No.	Title	Lyrics	Singer(s)	Length
1.	"Kelisade Kallukallinali (Male version)"	Doddarange Gowda	S. P. Balasubrahmanyam	4:55
2.	"Belli Kalungura"	Hamsalekha	S. Janaki, Chithra	4:52
3.	"Onde Ondu (Male Version)"	Hamsalekha	S. P. Balasubrahmanyam	5:13
4.	"Me Ladki Ladki"	Sriranga	Manjula Gururaj	4:56
5.	"Maama Maama Chandamaama"	V. Manohar	Chithra, S. P. Balasubrahmanyam	5:17
6.	"Onde Ondu (Female Version)"	Hamsalekha	S. Janaki	5:11
7.	"Kelisade Kallukallinali (Female version)"	Doddarange Gowda	Chithra	4:52
Total length:				35:16
