= Shivaraj =

Shivaraj may refer to:

- Shivaraj Sajjanar Indian politician
- Shivaraj Municipality administrative division in Nepal
