= Kaliyuga Seethe =

- Directed by: Vijay
- Written by: M. D. Sundar
- Screenplay by: M. D. Sundar
- Produced by: B. Nagi Reddy; Damayanthi
- Starring: Malashri; Sunil
- Cinematography: Mahendra Chittibabu
- Edited by: Narasaiah
- Music by: Rajan–Nagendra
- Production company: Sri Durga Art Productions
- Release date: 27 November 1992
- Running time: 123 minutes
- Country: India
- Language: Kannada

Kaliyuga Seethe is a 1992 Indian Kannada-language romantic drama film directed by Vijay and written by M. D. Sundar. The film stars Malashri, Sunil with Srinivasa Murthy, Sudheer and Lohithaswa in key supporting roles.

The film's music was composed by Rajan–Nagendra and the audio was launched on the Lahari Music banner.

== Cast ==
- Malashri
- Sunil
- Srinivasa Murthy
- Avinash
- Lohithaswa
- Sudheer
- Balakrishna
- M. S. Umesh
- Shivakumar
- Tennis Krishna
- Sihi Kahi Chandru
- Bhagyashri
- Vanishri

== Soundtrack ==
The music of the film was composed by Rajan–Nagendra and lyrics written by Chi. Udaya Shankar.

Track listing
No.	Title	Lyrics	Singer(s)	Length
1.	"Hoovu Beke Hoovu"	Chi. Udaya Shankar	K. S. Chithra
2.	"Dinavu Nalide"	Chi. Udaya Shankar	S. P. Balasubrahmanyam, K. S. Chithra
3.	"Sarasa Sarasa"	Chi. Udaya Shankar	S. P. Balasubrahmanyam, K. S. Chithra
4.	"Thattu Innu Thattu"	Chi. Udaya Shankar	K. S. Chithra
5.	"Amma Naanu"	Chi. Udaya Shankar	B. R. Chaya
