= Thavarumane Udugore =

- VCD cover
- Directed by: B. Subba Rao
- Written by: B. Subba Rao
- Screenplay by: B. Subba Rao
- Produced by: D. Rama Naidu
- Starring: Sridhar; Malashri; Sunil; Srinath; Hema Choudhary
- Cinematography: V. Prathap
- Edited by: K. V. Krishna Reddy; K. Madhavan
- Music by: Upendra Kumar
- Production company: Suresh Productions
- Release date: 26 April 1991
- Running time: 137 minutes
- Country: India
- Language: Kannada

Thavarumane Udugore is a 1991 Indian Kannada-language drama film directed by B. Subba Rao and produced by D. Rama Naidu under Suresh Productions. The film stars Malashri, Sridhar and Sunil. The film was a remake of the 1988 Rajasthani film Bai Chali Sasariye.

The film's music was composed by Upendra Kumar and the audio was launched on the Lahari Music banner.

== Cast ==
- Malashri as Lakshmi
- Sridhar
- Sunil
- Rajesh
- Hema Choudhary
- Viji Chandrasekhar
- Srinath
- Umashree
- Vaishali Kasaravalli
- Mysore Lokesh
- Balaraj
- Mandeep Roy
- Keerthiraj
- Veena

== Plot Summary ==
The story revolves around Lakshmi (Malashri), a kind-hearted and cheerful young woman who is deeply loved by her family. She is married off to a well-to-do gentleman (Sridhar) and transitions into her new life with her in-laws. The title Thavarumane Udugore refers to the traditional sentiments, responsibilities, and emotional attachments connected to the gifts a bride receives from her maternal home as she transitions into her husband's family. However, the narrative takes an emotional and dramatic turn when complex family dynamics, hardships, and misunderstandings begin to threaten her happiness. Lakshmi's deep bond with her parents and brothers comes under heavy strain due to societal and financial pressures. Throughout the emotional turmoil, Lakshmi emerges as a pillar of sacrifice and endurance, trying to mend broken familial ties and bring harmony back to both households. The film follows her journey through dense emotional conflicts, leading up to a dramatic and sentimental climax that tests the strength of maternal and marital bonds.

=== Production and Cinematic Context ===
The film was structured heavily as a "family sentimental entertainer," a genre that peaked in popularity during the early 1990s in Kannada cinema. Produced by D. Rama Naidu, it showcased top-tier production values for its time. The story was highly universal, capturing the vulnerabilities of the Indian joint-family system. Its source material (Bai Chali Sasariye) was so structurally impactful that it sparked multiple regional remakes across India, including: Puttinti Pattu Cheera (1990) in Telugu Maherchi Sadi (1991) in Marathi (which became one of the highest-grossing Marathi films of all time) Saajan Ka Ghar (1994) in Hindi, starring Juhi Chawla and Rishi Kapoor

== Soundtrack ==
The music of the film was composed by Upendra Kumar, with lyrics by Chi. Udaya Shankar.

Track listing
No.	Title	Lyrics	Singer(s)	Length
1.	"Chiguride Hosa Latheyu"	Chi. Udaya Shankar	S. P. Balasubrahmanyam, Manjula Gururaj
2.	"Ellellu Neene"	Chi. Udaya Shankar	S. P. Balasubrahmanyam, Manjula Gururaj
3.	"Amma Anthu Illa"	Chi. Udaya Shankar	S. P. Balasubrahmanyam
4.	"Kai Bale Ghal Ghal"	Chi. Udaya Shankar	Manjula Gururaj
5.	"Kannirale Huttida Thavare"	Chi. Udaya Shankar	S. Janaki
6.	"Shubhamasthu Shubhamasthu"	Chi. Udaya Shankar	S. Janaki
