= K. V. Raju =

Indian film director (1954–2021)

- Born: 1954
- Died: 24 December 2021 (aged 66–67); Bengaluru, India
- Occupations: Film director, screenwriter, dialogue writer
- Known for: Kannada cinema and Bollywood films

K. V. Raju (1954 – 24 December 2021) was an Indian film director, screenwriter and dialogue writer who worked in Kannada and Hindi cinema.

He started his career in Kannada film industry in 1982 as an associate director in Baadada Hoo directed by his brother K. V. Jayaram and debuted as a director and scriptwriter in 1984 film Olave Baduku. He directed many acclaimed Kannada films in the 1980s and 1990s. He debuted in Hindi film industry in 1991 as the director of Indrajeet and his other two Hindi films are Udhaar Ki Zindagi and Khooni Jung.

Raju died from a heart attack at his Rajaji Nagar residence in Bengaluru on 24 December 2021, at the age of 67.

== Selected filmography ==
=== Director ===
Year	Film	Notes
1987	Sangrama	
1987	Bandha Muktha	
1988	Navabharatha	
1989	Indrajith	
1989	Yuddha Kaanda	
1991	Sundarakanda	
1991	Kadana	
1991	Indrajeet	Hindi
1992	Belli Modagalu	
1992	Belli Kalungura	
1992	Police Lockup	
1993	Abhijith	
1993	Bombat Hudga	
1994	Udhaar Ki Zindagi	Hindi
1994	O Gandasare Neeveshtu Olleyavaru	
1996	Huliya	
1997	Yuddha	
1998	Number 1	
2001	Prema Rajya	
2001	Rashtrageethe	
2004	Nija	
2006	Pandavaru	

=== Writer only ===
Year	Film	Director	Notes
1985	Shwetha Gulabi		
1986	Hosa Neeru		
1989	C.B.I. Shankar		
1989	Jayabheri		
1996	Kempu Mugilu		
1997	CBI Durga		
2001	Avaran Bit Ivaran Bit Avar Yaaru		
2004	Kalasipalya		
2004	Bhagavan		
2008	Gaja		
2010	Shourya		
2010	Deadly 2		
2010	Kari Chirathe		
2011	Rajadhani		
2012	Dashamukha		
2013	Brindavana		
2014	Ragini IPS		
2017	Tiger Galli		
2019	Kempegowda 2		
