= Joe Simon (director) =

Indian Kannada film director and writer (1947/1948–2026)

- Born: S. M. Joe Simon; 1947 or 1948
- Died: 12 February 2026 (aged 78); Bengaluru, Karnataka, India
- Occupations: Film director; Actor; Screenplay & story writer; Lyricist
- Children: 4

S. M. Joe Simon (1947 or 1948 – 12 February 2026) was an Indian film director, actor, lyricist, screenplay and story writer, known for his work in Kannada cinema. Some of the films directed by Simon are Mr. Vasu (1995), Wanted (1993), Ravivarma (1992), Snehada Kadalalli (1992).

Simon was a part of more than 100 films in Kannada, either as actor, dialogue writer or director. He had served as the Vice-president of Kannada Film Directors Association (KANFIDA). He died from a heart attack on 12 February 2026, at the age of 78.

== Selected filmography ==
=== As a director ===
Year	Film(s)
1977	Ondu Premada Kathe
1980	Simha Jodi
1980	Nanna Rosha Nooru Varusha
1981	Maha Prachandaru
1982	Sahasa Simha
1982	Oorige Upakari
1983	Nyaya Geddithu
1983	Sididedda Sahodara
1984	Rowdy Raja
1984	Prema Jyothi
1984	Odeda Haalu
1984	Raktha Thilaka
1985	Maha Purusha
1986	Prema Jaala
1988	Bharath
1989	Raja Simha
1989	Hongkongnalli Agent Amar
1991	Shivaraj
1992	Snehada Kadalalli
1992	Samara Simha
1992	Ravivarma
1993	Wanted
1994	Time Bomb
1995	Mr. Vasu
1995	Chiranjeevi Rajegowda
2000	Krishnarjuna
2007	Dadagiri
2019	Payana

=== As a writer ===
- Idu Entha Premavayya (1999) (screenplay)

== See also ==
- List of people from Karnataka
- Cinema of Karnataka
- List of film and television directors
- List of Indian film actors
- Cinema of India
