= B. Ramamurthy =

Indian film director

- Born: Bheemrao Ramamurthy
- Occupations: Actor, director
- Children: Akshay Ramamurthy, Adarsh Ramamurthy

B. Ramamurthy is an Indian director who works in Kannada films. He wrote and directed numerous blockbuster films. He is known for giving chances to youngsters who have made names in Kannada Film Industry and beyond. He is known to have an exceptional eye for talent, a trait acknowledged by his well established disciples. He is considered one of the most revered directors of Kannada film industry sandalwood.

== Selected filmography ==
| Year | Film Name |
|---|---|
| 1990 | Rudratandava |
| 1990 | Ashoka Chakra |
| 1990 | Rani Maharani |
| 1991 | Rollcall Ramakrishna |
| 1991 | Shwetagni |
| 1991 | Nanagu Hendthi Beku |
| 1991 | Central Rowdy |
| 1991 | CBI Shiva |
| 1991 | Kiladi Gandu |
| 1992 | Shakthi Yukti |
| 1992 | Alli Ramaachaari Illi Brahmachari |
| 1992 | Marana Mrudanga |
| 1992 | Vajrayudha |
| 1992 | Mana Mecchida Sose |
| 1993 | Love Training |
| 1993 | Hrudaya Bandhana |
| 1994 | Gopi Kalyana |
| 1994 | Apoorva Samsaara |
| 1994 | Mayor Prabhakar |
| 1995 | Shiva |
| 1995 | Aata Hudugata |
| 1996 | Anuraga Spandana |
| 2000 | Minchu |
| 2003 | Galaate Maduve |
| 2004 | Super Aliya |
| 2005 | Lathi Charge |
| 2006 | Rambha |
| 2010 | Naa Rani Nee Maharani |
| 2010 | Crazy Kutumba |
