= Loosegalu =

Kannada language Indian film

- Official poster
- Directed by: Arun
- Produced by: Sayed Hussain
- Starring: Sriimurali; Shreeki; Akul Balaji; Aishwarya Nag; Shravya Rao; Rekha Vedavyas
- Cinematography: HK Chidananda
- Edited by: Akshay P Rao
- Music by: Vani Harikrishna
- Production company: County Film Makers
- Release date: 26 July 2013
- Country: India
- Language: Kannada

Loosegalu (transl. Crazy people) is a 2013 Indian Kannada-language romantic comedy film directed by Arun and starring Sriimurali, Shreeki, Akul Balaji, Aishwarya Nag, Shravya Rao, and Rekha Vedavyas.

== Cast ==
- Sriimurali as Kabir
- Shreeki as Buji
- Akul Balaji as Shankar
- Aishwarya Nag as Milky
- Shravya Rao
- Rekha Vedavyas as Maggie

== Production ==
The film began production as Naavu Loosegalu Neevu Loosegalu (transl. We are crazy, you are crazy) before the title was shortened. The film is produced by restaurant owner Sayed Hussain. Vijay Raghavendra wore a wig for his role in the film. This film marked the debut of Om Prakash Rao and Rekha Das's daughter Shravya Rao. As part of film promotions, the film's title was written in 4D and the name of the film was written as a barcode.

== Soundtrack ==
This film marks the debut of Vani Harikrishna, wife of V. Harikrishna, as a music director. Restaurant worker Raghavendra worked as a lyric writer.

Track listing
No.	Title	Singer(s)	Length
1.	"Beso Ghali Edhu"	Deepak Doddare, Aishwarya	3:24
2.	"Bheli Hari Odebandhe"	Vani Harikrishna	4:04
3.	"Govindha"	Tippu	3:59
4.	"Title Song"	Santhosh Venky, Suvarna Rathood	1:46
5.	"Navvu Neevu Ella Loosegalu"	Shreyas, Rama	4:26
6.	"Rabba Rabba"	Suvarna Rathood, Santhosh Venky	4:17
Total length:			21:56

== Release and reception ==
The film was initially scheduled to release on 19 July 2013 before the date was pushed to 26 July.

A critic from Sify opined that "The director has made an honest attempt to showcase youths and their troubles, but the movie falls short of expectations and in the process fails to impress the audience". A. Sharadhaa of The New Indian Express stated that "A moral lesson of sorts, Loosegalu tries to tell us about what happens when we try to take shortcuts to success but it loses track on the way". A critic from The Times of India wrote that "The movie has a good theme to deal with, but the narration is too slow and many times lengthy keeping you guessing what the director wants to say".
