= 49th Filmfare Awards South =

Ceremony

- Date: 20 April 2002
- Site: Jawaharlal Nehru Stadium, Chennai, Tamil Nadu, India

Highlights
- Best Picture: Kothigalu Sir Kothigalu (Kannada); Meghamalhar (Malayalam); Aanandham (Tamil); Nuvvu Nenu (Telugu)
- Most awards: Nuvvu Nenu (4; Telugu)
- Most nominations: Huchcha (5; Kannada); Murari (5; Telugu)

The 49th Filmfare Awards South ceremony honouring the winners and nominees of the best of South Indian cinema for films released 2001, was held on 20 April 2002 at the Jawaharlal Nehru Stadium, Chennai.

== Multiple nominations and awards ==
=== Kannada ===
- Nominations
  - 5 nominations: Huchcha
  - 3 nominations: Vaalee
  - 2 nominations: Kothigalu Saar Kothigalu
  - 1 nomination: Nanna Preethiya Hudugi, Kotigobba, Kanasugara, Gattimela and Chithra
- Awards
  - 1 award: Huchcha, Kothigalu Saar Kothigalu, Nanna Preethiya Hudugi, Kanasugara and Chithra

=== Malayalam ===
- Nominations
  - 4 nominations: Meghamalhar and Uthaman
  - 2 nominations: Theerthadanam and Kattu Vannu Vilichappol
  - 1 nomination: Karumadikkuttan, Ravanaparabhu and Ishtam
- Awards
  - 2 awards: Meghamalhar
  - 1 award: Karumadikkuttan, Theerthadanam, and Ravanaparabhu

=== Tamil ===
- Nominations
  - 4 nominations: Aanandham and Kasi
  - 2 nominations: Nandhaa and Poovellam Un Vasam
  - 1 nomination: Friends, Pandavar Bhoomi, Aalavandhan and Minnale
- Awards
  - 3 awards: Minnale (including female debut and female playback singer)
  - 2 awards: Nandhaa (including cinematography)
  - 1 award: Aanandham, Pandavar Bhoomi, Kasi and Paarthale Paravasam (Choreography)

=== Telugu ===
- Nominations
  - 5 nominations: Murari
  - 4 nominations: Nuvvu Nenu and Narasimha Naidu
  - 3 nominations: Kushi
  - 1 nomination: Preminchu
- Awards
  - 4 awards: Nuvvu Nenu
  - 1 award: Kushi

== Main awards ==
Winners are listed first, highlighted in boldface.

=== Kannada cinema ===
Best Film	Best Director
**Kothigalu Saar Kothigalu**; Huchcha; Vaalee	**Nagathihalli Chandrashekar – Nanna Preethiya Hudugi**; S. Mahendar – Vaalee; Om Prakash Rao – Huchcha
Best Actor	Best Actress
**Sudeep – Huchcha**; Ramesh Aravind – Kothigalu Saar Kothigalu; Vishnuvardhan – Kotigobba	**Prema – Kanasugara**; Rekha Vedavyas – Huchcha; Shruthi – Gattimela
Best Music Director
**Gurukiran – Chitra**; Rajesh Ramanath – Huchcha; Rajesh Ramanath – Vaalee

=== Malayalam cinema ===
Best Film	Best Director
**Meghamalhar**; Theerthadanam; Uthaman	**Vinayan – Karumadikkuttan**; Anil Babu – Uthaman; Kamal – Meghamalhar
Best Actor	Best Actress
**Jayaram – Theerthadanam**; Biju Menon – Meghamalhar; Jayaram – Uthaman	**Samyuktha Varma – Meghamalhar**; Chippy – Kattu Vannu Vilichappol; Sindhu Menon – Uthaman
Best Music Director
**Suresh Peters – Ravanaparabhu**; Mohan Sitara – Ishtam; M. G. Radhakrishnan – Kattu Vannu Vilichappol

=== Tamil cinema ===
Best Film	Best Director
**Aanandham**; Friends; Kasi	**Cheran – Pandavar Bhoomi**; Bala – Nandhaa; N. Lingusamy – Aanandham; Vinayan - Kasi
Best Actor	Best Actress
**Vikram – Kasi**; Ajith Kumar – Poovellam Un Vasam; Kamal Haasan – Aalavandhan	**Laila – Nandhaa**; Devayani – Aanandham; Jyothika – Poovellam Un Vasam
Best Music Director
**Harris Jayaraj – Minnale**; Ilaiyaraja – Kasi; S. A. Rajkumar – Aanandham

=== Telugu cinema ===
Best Film	Best Director
**Nuvvu Nenu**; Kushi; Murari	**Teja – Nuvvu Nenu**; B. Gopal – Narasimha Naidu; Krishna Vamsi – Murari
Best Actor	Best Actress
**Uday Kiran – Nuvvu Nenu**; Balakrishna Nandamuri – Narasimha Naidu; Mahesh Babu – Murari; Pawan Kalyan - Kushi	**Bhoomika Chawla – Kushi**; Laya – Preminchu; Sonali Bendre – Murari; Simran - Narasimha Naidu
Best Music Director
**R. P. Patnaik – Nuvvu Nenu**; Mani Sharma – Narasimha Naidu; Mani Sharma – Murari

== Technical Awards ==
Best Choreography: Lawrence – from Paarthale Paravasam	Best Cinematography: R. Rathnavelu – Nandhaa

== Special awards ==
Lifetime Achievement: M. S. Viswanathan; Dasari Narayana Rao	Filmfare Award for Best Female Debut - South: Reemma Sen - Minnale	Best Playback Singer: Bombay Jayashri - Minnale
