= Victory 2 =

- Directed by: Hari Santhosh
- Screenplay by: Tharun Sudhir
- Story by: Tharun Sudhir
- Produced by: Manasa Tharun; Tarun Shivappa
- Starring: Sharan; Asmita Sood; Apoorva; P. Ravishankar
- Cinematography: Guruprashanth Rai
- Edited by: K. M. Prakash
- Music by: Arjun Janya
- Production company: Tharun Talkies
- Distributed by: Jayanna Films
- Release date: 1 November 2018
- Running time: 150 minutes
- Country: India
- Language: Kannada

Victory 2 is a 2018 Indian Kannada-language comedy film directed by Hari Santhosh, written by Tharun Sudhir and produced by Tharun Shivappa under the banner Tharun Talkies. Initially published as a sequel to Nanda Kishore's 2013 film Victory, the film retains the cast and crew of the prequel including actors Sharan, Asmita Sood, P. Ravishankar, Sadhu Kokila and technicians including Guruprashanth Rai as cinematographer and Arjun Janya as music composer. Apoorva, Avinash, Nassar, Tabla Nani among others are newly added in the cast.

The film was released on 1 November 2018, coinciding the Karnataka Rajyotsava day. It received mixed reviews from the critics and was appreciated for its comic content. Sharan played a quadruplet in the movie thereby becoming the second Indian actor after Kamal Hassan to play such a role.

== Plot ==
The film starts with Chandru being taken by the police. The film shifts to flashback.

Chandru is raised by his deaf uncle and dumb aunty. Priya who had married him in the previous film, always doubts him and is fed up of him. But her father scolds her and asks her to forgive him and not to fight with him on silly reasons. Meanwhile, they get a call from hospital that Chandru is admitted. They rush to hospital and discover that Chandru had asked doctor to cut his unloading part because of Priya. Priya realizes her mistakes. Chandru and Priya reunite.

Meanwhile, Munna and Maamu are released from jail. Munna saves Nandini from a gas leak accident and gets her ring and starts to fall for her. They hear two men talking there is bag full of golds in one room of a house and they want two Ayyangari women for cooking. Munna and Maamu disguise as women and are selected for cooking. Munna introduces himself as Nagavalli and Maamu introduces himself as Chandramukhi and say both are sisters. But since that was very strict and dangerous house, they manage to escape.

A man pranks Chandru and he leaves his wife and comes for which she is angered. While returning, he saves an old man from some people. Chandru does not recognize Munna and Maamu and asks them to give lift to him. Later discovering that they were CCB officers and the man was Dawoor Hussain, a dangerous criminal. Chandru is arrested for saving him. Dawoor takes him back to same house which is his sister's.

Chandru asks them to take him to court. But he wakes up in a house where Dawoor video calls and asks him to take place of his son Salim who is in jail showing his mother. He agrees for one week. Munna gets jealous because Nandini mistakes Salim for Munna. But they hear Dawoor saying that Chandru would be killed in the jail itself.

Sadhu Gowda is assigned the case of Chandru. Munna as Nagavalli, with the help of Nandini, meets Sadhu and reveals that Chandru would be killed. Sadhu disguises himself as Arundhati, Nagavalli and Chandramukhi's sister and enters the house. He sees a couple tied in the room and escapes. Dawoor finds the couple and questions his sister. At the same time Nandini, now aware Nagavalli is Munna, narrates him the story.

Dawoor's sister wanted to divide the property and kept the rich property with her and her husband and poor property for her husband's brother and his wife. But the poor couple found gold in a deceased Shiva temple. On hearing this, Dawoor's sister had blackmailed them to reveal the place of gold but they managed to escape with their quadruplet children. But their father gets hit and both are captured. But however the kids are saved since they had sat on a goods train. Doctor says that they have lost the memory.

Dawoor wants 50 percent from the gold. Sadhu calls Munna and reveals it. Meanwhile, with the help of a man from the previous film, Chandru escapes. But Salim in the form of Chandru, enters his house. Chandru calls Priya and reveals everything. Angered, she mixes sleep tablets in milk for Salim. Dawoor and his sister realize that the three are indeed men. Chandru reaches his home and drinks the milk instead. Nandini comes crying home saying Nagavalli is Munna (she was acting to save him). Salim tries to kill Priya but is beaten by Munna. Munna and Priya make Chandru vomit and save him. Munna says that Salim, Chandru and him are brothers. But they hide it from Salim since he will not believe them and tie him. Priya leaves to meet her father and bring him to the place where the gold is. Nandini says the old couple that their sons are back for which they react and say that they had never lost the memory and reveal the place.

Dawoor, his sister and her family reach the spot. Dawoor ties Munna, Chandru, their parents, Maamu, Sadhu and his sister's family and asks Salim (who untied by Chandru's uncle) to blast them. But he refuses saying that they are innocent. Dawoor reveals that Salim is adopted and ties him too. But Sadhu says that if the couple has four kids, then they have forgotten the fourth one.

Here enters Richie, who fights all men. However snakes enter and climb everybody. Snakes leave and Sadhu says that all four were adopted from the goods train so he knows that they are their kids.

== Cast ==
- Sharan as Chandru / Munna / Salim / Richie
- Apoorva as Nandini, Munna's love interest
- Asmita Sood as Priya Chandru
- P. Ravishankar as Maamu
- Sadhu Kokila as Sadhu Gowda
- Avinash as DCP Rajendra, Priya's father
- Nassar as Dawoor Hussain
- Tabla Nani as Chandru's adoptive uncle
- Arasu Maharaj as Bahubali
- Mimicry Dayanand
- Rajashekar
- Keerthi Raj as Veerabhadra
- Ganesh Rao Kesarkar
- Kalyanee raju as Suvarna
- Sundar Rao as Lakshmana
- Kuri Prathap
- Lahari Velu as Home Minister
- Mithra as Snake Trainer
- Manjunath Hegde as Ramanna, Father of Chandru, Munna, Salim, Richie
- Aruna Balaraj as Lakshmi, Mother of Chandru, Munna, Salim & Richie
- Shivakumar Aaradhya
- M. N. Suresh
- Mallesh Gowda

== Soundtrack ==
Victory 2

Soundtrack album by Arjun Janya
- Released: 25 October 2018
- Recorded: 2018
- Genre: Film soundtrack
- Language: Kannada
- Label: Anand Audio
- Producer: Arjun Janya

Arjun Janya has scored the soundtrack and the background score for the film. Janya composed three songs written by V. Nagendra Prasad, Yogaraj Bhat and Shivu Bhergi. The song "Naav Maneg Hogodilla" reunited the hit combination of Janya, Bhat and singer Vijay Prakash which was well promoted before the film release. Leading actors of Kannada cinema were shown to be listening and enjoying the song making it to top the charts.

Tracklist
| No. | Title | Lyrics | Singer(s) | Length |
|---|---|---|---|---|
| 1. | "Cheap & Best" | V. Nagendra Prasad | Divya Kumar |
| 2. | "Kuttu Kuttu" | Shivu Bhergi | Shabbir Dange, Shamitha Malnad |
| 3. | "Naav Maneg Hogodilla" | Yogaraj Bhat | Vijay Prakash |
| Total length: | | | | 19:28 |
