= Mukunda Murari =

- Theatrical release poster
- Directed by: Nanda Kishore
- Story by: Umesh Shukla
- Based on: OMG – Oh My God! "Kanji Virrudh Kanji"
- Produced by: M.N.Kumar; Jayashreedevi
- Starring: Sudeepa; Upendra; Ishita Vyas; Nikita Thukral; P. Ravi Shankar
- Cinematography: Sudhakar S. Raj
- Edited by: K. M. Prakash
- Music by: Arjun Janya
- Production companies: MNK Movies; Kichcha Creations; Jayashreedevi Productions
- Release date: 28 October 2016
- Country: India
- Language: Kannada

Mukunda Murari is a 2016 Indian Kannada-language devotional satirical comedy drama film directed by Nanda Kishore. The film stars Sudeep in an Lord Krishna role and Upendra playing the role of atheist, teaming up for the first time. The film, a remake of Hindi film OMG - Oh My God! (2012), which in turn was based on a Gujarati stage play Kanji Virrudh Kanji, is produced by M.N. Kumar along with B. Jayashree Devi. The rest of the cast includes Nikita Thukral, Ishita Vyas, Kaavya Shah, P. Ravishankar, Avinash among others. The film has cinematography by Sudhakar S. Raj. The soundtrack and film score are composed by Arjun Janya.

The film released in over 250 screens on 28 October 2016 and ran for 50 days in theatres.

== Plot ==
The film follows the story of an atheist, Mukunda, who sues God after losing his shop in an earthquake. Religious organizations revolt against him, and Murari visits him as his human guide.

Atheist shop owner Mukunda (Upendra) talks about selling bulk statues of Hindu gods, and later tricks a devotee from Andhra Pradesh into buying a statue by claiming it is famous. The lack of respect, as his family sees it, makes his wife sad, and she makes their son write the name of Rama for at least ten pages. After that, he criticises the practices of his son and wife. On the night of Krishna Janmashtami, he openly mocks a guru named Siddeshwara Swami Avinash who was encouraging his son and wife to walk on fire and pierce their tongues with a Trishula. However, after a dangerous earthquake in his market in Mysore, his antique shop was destroyed and had many financial liabilities. His in-laws' family had separated his wife and son from him.

== Cast ==
- Sudeepa as Murari / Krishna
- Upendra as Mukunda
- Nikita Thukral as Mukunda's wife
- P. Ravi Shankar as Leeladhara Swamy
- Devaraj as a retired advocate
- Prakash Belawadi as advocate
- Avinash as Siddeshwara Swami
- Malavika Avinash as TV interviewer
- Ishita Vyas as Gopika Mathe
- Kaavya Shah as a news reporter
- Tabla Nani as Mukunda's assistant
- Shivaram as Swamiji
- Kuri Prathap as Insurance Company Official
- Dingri Nagaraj
- Bullet Prakash
- K. S. Shridhar as priest
- Mohan Juneja
- Rachita Ram
- Bhavana
- Sathish Ninasam
- Mimicry Dayanand
- Vasu
- Swapna Raj
- Kuri Sunil
- Rockline Sudhakar

== Production ==
=== Development ===
In January 2016, it was reported that director Nanda Kishore was in preparation to remake the hit Bollywood film OMG - Oh My God!, retaining the basic plot and giving it a native touch. Initially, the film was titled 'Kiccha!! Nee Begane Baaro', 'Brahma Vishnu', 'Sri Krishanrjuna Vijaya', 'Super Star Mattu Bigg Boss' and the makers roped in two of the biggest stars Upendra and Sudeepa to reprise the roles played by Paresh Rawal and Akshay Kumar respectively in the original version. Later, the title was altered as the makers thought the earlier one was quite a common name. To bring the uniqueness to the title, it was renamed to Mukunda Murari.

=== Casting ===
After having roped in Upendra and Sudeepa to play the protagonist roles, the makers were on the search for the female lead and approached actress Prema, hoping to bring her back to the screen after a long hiatus. Later Priyanka Upendra's name was also considered for this role. However, actress Nikita Thukral was finalized to play the wife role to Upendra. Further, actresses' names such as Ramya Krishnan, Sadha, and Nidhi Subbaiah were reported to play key supporting roles. Since none of these actresses were available, Ishita Vyas and Kaavya Shah were roped in to play those roles. The director went on to cast P. Ravi Shankar and Avinash to play other key roles.

== Soundtrack ==
Mukunda Murari

Soundtrack album by Arjun Janya
- Released: 16 October 2016
- Recorded: 2016
- Genre: Feature film soundtrack
- Length: 17:58
- Language: Kannada
- Label: D Beats
- Producer: Arjun Janya

Arjun Janya chronology
Kalpana 2 (2016)	Mukunda Murari (2016)	Hebbuli (2017)

Arjun Janya had composed the soundtrack and score for the film collaborating with Upendra for the third time after Super Ranga (2014), Kalpana 2 (2016) and Sudeep for fourth time after Kempe Gowda (2011), Varadanayaka (2013) and Maanikya (2014). A total of four songs and one instrumental track were composed by him. The audio was officially released on 16 October 2016 through the D Beats Music label.

Tracklist
No.	Title	Lyrics	Singer(s)	Length
1.	"Gopala Baa"	V. Nagendra Prasad	Vijay Prakash, Palak Muchhal, Chintan Vikas	3:39
2.	"Mukunda Murari"	V. Nagendra Prasad	Shankar Mahadevan	5:21
3.	"I Am God God is Great"	Yogaraj Bhat	Upendra	4:00
4.	"Sri Krishna Flute"	Instrumental	Kamlakar (Flute)	2:03
5.	"Mukunda Theme"	Various	Various	2:45
Total length:				17:58

== Release ==
The film was released in over 250 screens on 28 October 2016.

=== Box office ===
The film was released on the occasion of Deepavali. The film ran for 50 days in theaters.

== Awards and nominations ==
IIFA Utsavam :-

- Best Villain Kannada (2016) - P. Ravishankar - Nominated
- Best Lyricist Kannada (2016) - V. Nagendra Prasad for the song "Neene Raama Neene Shyama" - Nominated

64th Filmfare Awards South :-

- Best Lyrics - Kannada (2016) - V. Nagendra Prasad for the song "Neene Raama Neene Shyama" - Nominated
- Best Male Playback Singer – Kannada (2016) - Shankar Mahadevan for the song "Neene Raama Neene Shyama" - Nominated

6th South Indian International Movie Awards :-

- Best Actress In A Supporting Role - Kannada (2016) - Kaavya Sha - Nominated (result pending)
- Best Actor In A Negative Role - Kannada (2016) - P. Ravishankar - Nominated (result pending)
- Best Lyricist - Kannada (2016) - V. Nagendra Prasad for the song "Neene Raama Neene Shyama" - Nominated (result pending)
- Best Music Director - Kannada (2016) - Arjun Janya - Nominated (result pending)

== See also ==
- OMG - Oh My God!
- Gopala Gopala
- The Man Who Sued God
- Religious satire
