= Tarun Shivappa =

Indian producer

- Born: 1 April 1983 (age 43); Attibele, Bangalore
- Occupations: Film producer, Entrepreneur
- Years active: 2007–present
- Known for: Victory 2, Mass Leader
- Spouse: Manasa Tarun

Tarun Shivappa (Kannada: ತರುಣ್ ಶಿವಪ್ಪ) is an Indian film producer best known for his work in Kannada cinema. As of 2023, Shivappa had produced five films.

== Early life ==
Tarun Shivappa was born on 1 April 1983 to Shivappa and Susheelamma in Attibele, a town in Bangalore, Karnataka. He graduated with Bachelor of Commerce degree from BTL Degree College & BES College. He is married to Mansa Tarun.

== Career ==
Shivappa's career in the industry began as an assistant director for a TV channel in 2007. From there, he became a film section head and programming head. Shivappa founded 9 Thots Media Solutions, an advertising agency and event management company that hosts film awards and audio launch functions. He then moved into film production.

Shivappa started his production company Tarun Talkies and debuted with the Kannada language film Rose in 2014.

Shivappa teamed up with director Hari Santhosh to produce the sequel to Victory. The name of the sequel was retained. The film received a positive review from Indian Express who wrote, "Victory 2 - A sequel that offers four times the entertainment".

Shivappa produced the film Khaki which was released in 2020. In 2023, he produced Choo Mantar.

== Filmography ==
Year	Film	Notes
2014	Rose	
2017	Mass Leader	
2018	Victory 2	
2020	Khaki	
2023	Choo Mantar	
