= Huccha 2 =

- Directed by: Om Prakash Rao
- Screenplay by: D Manohar Chennai
- Story by: Ameer Sultan
- Based on: Raam (Tamil)(2005) by Ameer Sultan
- Produced by: A M Umesh Reddy
- Starring: Krishna; Shravya Rao; Malavika Avinash; P. Sai Kumar
- Cinematography: V Ravikumar
- Edited by: Lakshman N Reddy
- Music by: J. Anoop Seelin
- Release date: 6 April 2018
- Country: India
- Language: Kannada

Huccha 2 is a 2018 Indian Kannada-language drama film directed by Om Prakash Rao. A remake of the Tamil-language film Raam (2005), the film stars Krishna, Malavika Avinash, Shravya and P. Sai Kumar. It was released theatrically on 6 April 2018. It is a spiritual sequel of Rao's 2001 film Huchcha.

== Synopsis ==
Raam is a righteous man who loves his mother more than anyone else. However, his life is turned upside down when he is accused of murdering his own mother.

== Cast ==
- Krishna as Raam
- Shravya Rao as Kushi
- Malavika Avinash
- P. Sai Kumar
- Avinash
- Sadhu Kokila
- Ashwin Shetty
- Suchendra Prasad
- Om Prakash Rao

== Production ==
It was reported that Dhananjaya was to star in the film; however, he was replaced by Krishna. Reports that newcomer Vaishali would replace Shravya Rao proved to be false.

== Reception ==
Sunayana Suresh from The Times of India wrote "But, given how subtlety has slowly crept into the narratives, even among the commercial dramas, one wonders whether the filmmaker could have moved ahead in time while writing the screenplay for the original". A reviewer of Udayavani said, Apart from a few things like this, there are very few negatives in the movie Huccha 2. Other positives are performances by Krishna, Malavika, Saikumar and Avinash, songs and background music by Anoop Seelin, cinematography by Ravikumar, M.S. Ramesh's dialogues are eye-catching. Ganesh Ranebennur from Samyukta Karnataka wrote "It has nothing to do with him. Since this is a movie of a different vein, if you look at some aspects aside, you will like 'Huccha'. Anoop Seelin's songs and background music are one of the high points of the film. MS Ramesh dialogues complement the film".
