= Theedhum Soodhum Endhan Mugavari =

2023 Indian film by Ghitha Mohhan

- Theatrical release poster
- Directed by: Ghitha Mohhan
- Written by: Sreekumar Jay
- Produced by: Sreekumar Jay
- Starring: Sreekumar Jay; Angana Arya; Avinash Yelandur
- Cinematography: Parandhagan E
- Edited by: Bhuvanesh Manivannan
- Music by: Pranav Giridharan
- Production company: Jayanthi Productions
- Release date: 15 December 2023
- Country: India
- Language: Tamil

Theedhum Soodhum Endhan Mugavari (trans. Bad and evil is my address) is a 2023 Indian Tamil-language crime thriller film directed by Ghitha Mohhan. The film stars Sreekumar Jay, Angana Arya and Avinash Yelandur in the lead roles. The film was produced by Sreekumar Jay under the banner of Jayanthi Productions.

== Cast ==
- Sreekumar Jay
- Angana Arya
- Avinash Yelandur
- Srinivasan Lokanayakalu
- Baby Thakshika
- Kavitha Radheshyam

== Production ==
The film was produced by Sreekumar Jay under the banner of Jayanthi Productions. The cinematography was done by Parandhagan E, while editing was handled by Bhuvanesh Manivannan.

== Soundtrack ==
Soundtrack was composed by Pranav Giridharan.

- Ennodu Kadhal - Shibi Srinivasan, Maneswini
- Kanne Thoongadi - Pranav Giridharan, Asha Bhosle
- Kaasura Kaasura - Pranav Giridharan, Adarsh Bharadwaj
- Thiruda - Rishirpiya
- Wrath of Shiva - Pranav Giridharan, Armious
- Manitha - The Redemption - Jay, Pranav Giridharan
- Kaalan Naanae - Satyah, Pranav Giridharan
- Nature of Man - Pranav Giridharan
- Freakshow - Pranav Giridharan, Armious
- The Devil's Orchestra -Pranav Giridharan, Armious
- Nature of Man - Variation - Pranav Giridharan
- The Promise - Pranav Giridharan
- Umar's Plea - Pranav Giridharan
- Theethum Soothum - Pranav Giridharan

== Reception ==
Times Now critic rated 3 out of 5 and worte that "Theedhum Soodhum Endhan Mugavari promises a compelling journey through the intricacies of love and the challenges posed by societal expectations." and rated three out of five stars. Maalai Malar critic rated two point five out of five and stated that "lthough we have already seen the story of kidnapping for money in many films, it is special to change the course of the screenplay".
