= Khaki (2020 film) =

2020 Indian Kannada vigilante action drama film

- Film poster
- Directed by: Naveen Reddy. B
- Written by: Udaya Kumar PS
- Produced by: Tarun Shivappa; Manasa Tarun
- Starring: Chiranjeevi Sarja; Tanya Hope; Chaya Singh
- Cinematography: Bala
- Edited by: K.M.Prakash
- Music by: Rithvik Muralidhar
- Production company: Tarun Talkies
- Release date: 24 January 2020
- Running time: 116 minutes
- Country: India
- Language: Kannada

Khaki is a 2020 Indian Kannada-language vigilante action drama film written and directed by Naveen Reddy. B and produced by Tarun Shivappa and Manasa Tarun. It features Chiranjeevi Sarja and Tanya Hope along with Chaya Singh in the lead roles. The supporting cast includes Dev Gill and Shivmani. The score and soundtrack for the film is by Rithvik Muralidhar, the cinematography is by Bala, and the editing by K. M. Prakash. The film was released on 24 January 2020.

== Plot ==
A young Chiru seeks help from a police officer to help his sister, who had gone into labour, but the officer does not budge and leave. When Chiru returns to the house, his sister died leaving him orphaned which also causes hatred towards the police department. Chiru starts to trouble the police and gets caught in the process, where he meets an honest woman constable Chaya, where she consoles him and Chiru starts to respect Chaya as his sister. When Chaya gets a transfer order from the department, she tells Chiru to fight for what is right and learn what is wrong. Years later, Chiru is a do-gooder in a neighbourhood, where he works as a cable operator living with his friend Subhash and his wife Navya with an infant daughter.

Chaya has now become the Sub-inspector of the same neighbourhood, where she investigates about the case of an old man suicide case, along with garbage dumping in the neighbourhood. When Chaya meets Chiru to divulge the information, she dies from a car accident. After Chaya's death, the neighbourhood has been infested in waste dumping along with chain snatching activities, unknown to anyone it was orchestrated by neighbourhood's MLA under the orders from higher forces. After realizing that they are on their own now as the new SI Narasimha.G is a corrupt cop. Chiru along with his lover Lasya, Subhash and with neighbourhood people forms a team of vigilance group dubbed Parallel Police.

The vigilance group is a success where crime rates in the neighbourhood are reduced. However, the MLA plans water scarcity in the neighbourhood, but the problems are thwarted by Chiru and the neighbourhood people. One night, Subhash and Chiru finds the land survey files, which is purchased by only one person Dev, a Dubai-based businessman, who is the mastermind behind the waste dumping and the neighbourhood's problems. A constable named Thimmayya, who is Chiru's relative leaves his phone to know about the conversation between Dev, MLA and Narasimha where they learn that Dev is behind the old man's death and also had killed Chaya when she refused their offer to build an IT Park in the neighbourhood.

Meanwhile, the North Indian gang, who are hired by Dev finds Chiru and Subhash and reports it to Dev, who orders to kill them. Chiru and Subhash escape, However, Subhash is killed in the process leaving Chiru and Navya devastated. Enraged, the neighbourhood people led by Chiru thrashes and bring the North Indian gang and the MLA where they hand them over to the police, with evidences collected by Lasya. However, Dev is nowhere to be seen, sensing that he fled to Dubai. It is revealed that on the night when Subhash was killed, Chiru tracked Dev through Narasimha, where he killed Dev and burnt him in the dumping yard, thus having avenged Chaya and Subhash's death.

== Cast ==
- Chiranjeevi Sarja as Chiru, a cable Operator
- Tanya Hope as Lasya, Chiru's love interest
- Chaya Singh as SI Chaya, Chiru's adopted elder sister
- Dev Gill as Dev, a Dubai-based Businessman
- Shivmani as MLA
- Raghu Ramappa as SI Narasimha.G

== Soundtrack ==
Khaki

Soundtrack album by Rithvik Muralidhar
- Genre: Feature film soundtrack
- Language: Kannada
- Label: Lahari Music
- Producer: Tarun Shivappa

The film's music is composed by Rithvik Muralidhar. The music rights were acquired by Lahari Music.

Tracklist
No.	Title	Lyrics	Singer(s)	Length
1.	"Yaare Neenu"	V. Nagendra Prasad	Sanjith Hegde, Eesha Suchi	3:45
2.	"Pratiyobba"	Yograj Bhat	Naveen Sajju	3:40
3.	"Asalu Vishaya"	Kaviraj	Chetan Nayak, Eesha Suchi	3:53

== Production ==
The principal photography of the film finished on 12 February 2019. Tanya Hope was cast as the female lead and Chiranjeevi Sarja as the protagonist. The film had Rithvik Muralidhar on board to score music for the film.
