= Ishita Vyas =

Indian television and film actress

Ishitas
- Born: Manju Vyas
- Occupations: Actress, model
- Years active: 2010–present

Manju Vyas known by her stage name, Ishita Vyas is an Indian television and film actress. She placed in the top seven of the reality television show, Kingfisher Calendar Hunt 2013.

== Career ==
Vyas began her career as a model then she moved on to acting. Her first project was the talk show Lift Kara De for Yash Raj Films. Soon after the show went on air, she got a chance to play Jhalkaribai, an Indian female Koli soldier who played an important role in the Indian Rebellion of 1857 for the serial Jhansi Ki Rani. Her portrayal of Jhalkaribai led to widespread acclaim in both Bollywood and the television industry. She also played in a film for Kamdhenu Steel with John Matthew Matthan. After seeing Ishita's talent, financer and producer Apoorvaditya (Aaditya) Kulshreshtha signed him up for his big-budget suspense thriller film named 11.40, which will start shooting in August 2020.

== Filmography ==
=== Television ===
| Year (s) | Show | Role | Channel | Notes |
|---|---|---|---|---|
| 2010 | Lift Kara De | Herself | Sony TV | Contestant |
| 2010 | Ssshhhh...Phir Koi Hai | Malika | STAR One | |
| 2010 | Sapna Babul Ka...Bidaai | Laxmi | Star Plus | |
| 2011 | Mata Ki Chowki | Goddess Kali | Sahara One | |
| 2011 | Jhansi Ki Rani | Ran Bankura/Jhalkari Bai | Zee TV | |
| 2011 | Veer Shivaji | Janki Bai | Colors TV | |
| 2011–12 | Adaalat | Rukmani, Kavya, Meera Bhagat | Sony TV | Three episodes |
| 2011 | Mann Kee Awaaz Pratigya | Sheetal | Star Plus | |
| 2012 | Ruk Jaana Nahin | Rubina | Star Plus | |
| 2012 | Bade Achhe Lagte Hain | Isha | Sony TV | |
| 2012 | Shapath | Devika | Life OK | |
| 2012–13 | Savdhaan India @ 11 | Kavita, Sunita, Rakshanda, Arpita | Life OK | Four episodes, protagonist |

=== Films ===
| Year | Film | Role | Notes |
|---|---|---|---|
| 2010 | Peepli Live | Akshita | |
| 2010 | Maryam | Isha | Lead role |
| 2011 | Bete | Sunita | Lead role |
| 2012 | OMG – Oh My God! | Jenny | |
| 2013 | Commando | Natasha | |
| 2015 | Gabbar is Back | Veena | |
| 2015 | Miss Leelavathi | Leelavathi | Telugu film |
| 2015 | Majjilii | Queen Sundara | Telugu film |
| 2016 | Mukunda Murari | Gopika Maathe | Kannada film |
| 2017 | Chakravarthy | Item dancer | Kannada film |
| 2020 | 11:40 | Main Lead | Lead role |
