= Jerax =

- ಜೆರಾಕ್ಸ್
- Genre: Fantasy; Comedy; Thriller
- Created by: Srinidhi Bengaluru
- Written by: Srinidhi Bengaluru
- Directed by: Srinidhi Bengaluru
- Starring: Nagabhushana NS; Payal Chengappa; Om Prakash Rao; Vijay Prasad
- Music by: Vinay Shankar
- Country of origin: India
- Original language: Kannada
- No. of seasons: 1
- No. of episodes: 6

Production
- Executive producers: Murali Shankar Shastry; Yadunandan K M
- Producer: Dhananjaya
- Cinematography: Adarsha R
- Editor: Sanjeev Jagirdar
- Running time: 18- 24 minutes
- Production company: Daali Pictures

Original release
- Network: ZEE5
- Release: April 24, 2026

Jerax is a 2026 Indian Kannada-language fantasy comedy-thriller television miniseries written and directed by Srinidhi Bengaluru. Produced by Dhananjaya under the Daali Pictures banner, the series stars Nagabhushana NS in the lead role. It is scheduled to premiere on ZEE5 on 24 April 2026.

== Synopsis ==
The series follows Prakasha, a modest xerox shop employee in the town of Malavalli. His life takes a supernatural turn when his photocopying machine gains the ability to create living duplicates, human clones that possess the memories and traits of the originals. The narrative explores the social and personal chaos that ensues as multiple versions of the town's residents begin to coexist.

== Cast ==
- Nagabhushana NS as Prakasha
- Payal Chengappa as Sooji
- Manju Pavagada as Inspector Ravindra
- Om Prakash Rao as Dodappa
- Srivatsa S as Jingchak
- Vijay Prasad as Ramanna
- Thukali Santhu as Deepu
- Yeshwanth Shetty as Revanth
- Usha Bhandary as Kamalamma, Ramanna's wife
- Sudhakar Gowda R as Viral Venky, youtuber
- Siddu Mandya as Renu, Ramanna PA
- Jagappa as Huli
- Richard Louis as Sooji's father
- Vishal Patil as Channa
- Anand Ninasam as Nanjunda, Prakasha's father
- Aruna Balraj as Rajamma, Prakasha's mother

== Production ==
The series marks the directorial debut in the digital space for Srinidhi Bengaluru, who previously directed the critically acclaimed science-fiction film Blink (2024). Actor Dhananjaya produced the series under his home banner, Daali Pictures, marking his first venture into OTT production. The series was filmed primarily in the Mandya and Mysuru regions of Karnataka to capture a grounded, local aesthetic.

== Critical reception ==
The series received mixed reviews from critics, who praised the performances and concept but criticized the execution and pacing.

Vivek M.V. of The Hindu gave the series a positive review, describing it as "a witty fantasy drama propelled by fine performances." Anandu Suresh, writing for The Indian Express, noted that the lead actors "Nagabhushana [and] Payal Chengappa lead a simple fantasy comedy series that fumbles along the way."

Other reviewers were more critical of the show's pacing. India Today rated the series 2 out of 5 stars, stating that while the show features an "innovative concept", it ultimately represents a "wasted opportunity." Similarly, Susmita Sameera of The Times of India also awarded the series 2 out of 5 stars, concluding that it is "a unique concept that struggles to sustain engagement."
