= Huchcha =

2001 film by Om Prakash Rao

- Directed by: Om Prakash Rao
- Written by: M. S. Ramesh; R. Rajashekhar (Dialogues)
- Story by: Bala
- Based on: Sethu (Tamil)
- Produced by: K. Mustafa; Smt. A. Meharunnisa Rehman
- Starring: Sudeep; Rekha Vedavyas
- Cinematography: Anaji Nagaraj
- Edited by: S. Manohar
- Music by: Rajesh Ramanath
- Production company: Oscar Films
- Release date: 6 July 2001
- Running time: 142 minutes
- Country: India
- Language: Kannada

Huchcha (transl. Mad) is a 2001 Indian Kannada-language romantic tragedy drama film directed by Om Prakash Rao, starring Sudeep and Rekha Vedavyas. It is a remake of the 1999 Tamil film Sethu, The film released to positive reviews and brought a lot of fame to Sudeep. Earlier the script was rejected by Upendra and Shiva Rajkumar. The film Huccha 2 is not a continuation of this film but has a similar theme.

== Plot ==
Sachidananda aka Kicha (Sudeep) is a rough and macho college rowdy and also The student union's chairman of the college, who uses violence as the only way to deal with people. He lives with his brother, a Magistrate (Avinash), and his sister-in-law, who is the only person who seems to understand him properly.

The movie opens with Kicha winning the elections to the office bearers of the college's Students Union followed by celebrations and an in-campus fight between the rival candidates.

Kicha has a staple diet of yes-sir friends surrounding him. He comes across a timid girl, Abishta (Rekha Vedavyas), who is the daughter of a poor temple priest, and starts to woo her. When she initially rejects him, he kidnaps her and forces her to fall in love with him.

After Abishta falls in love with him, Kicha is attacked by some goons from a brothel who take revenge on him for interfering with their business. Kicha suffers from brain damage and ends up in a Swamiji's ashram. With no memory of his past and having developed an unusual behaviour, he starts to recollect memories. At one point, he is completely back to his normal self and tries to convince the wardens and Swamiji that he is back to normal and can be released. However, the Swamiji ignores him and the wardens beat him up. Desperate, Kicha tries to escape by climbing over the gates. He fails and ends up with serious injuries.

Whilst Kicha is sleeping with his injuries, Abishta makes a surprise visit. However Kicha is asleep and she leaves with this woeful memory of him. As she is about to leave the institution, he wakes up and realises that she had come to see him. As he calls out, she leaves unable to hear him.

Persistent in meeting her, Kicha makes another attempt to leave the institution and this time he is successful. When he arrives at Abishta's house, however, he finds Abishta dead. He realises that she had committed suicide.

Distraught after what he saw, Kicha walks out and his old friends and family try to help him remember who he is. Kicha pretends to be unconscious. At that point he is met with the mental institution wardens who came chasing after him. The film ends with Kicha leaving with them as he has nothing to live for after his true love's death.

== Cast ==
- Sudeep as Sachidananda / Kiccha
- Rekha Vedavyas as Abishta Shobhite Prasannakshi
- Pavitra Lokesh as Kicha's mentally disabled friend
- Shailaja Joshi as lecturer
- Sana as Kicha's sister-in-law
- M. N. Lakshmi Devi as Lakshmamma
- KS Sridhar as doctor
- Tarakesh Patel as Kicha's friend
- Anju Mahendran as Kicha's friend
- Shivaram as professor
- Avinash as Kicha's brother
- Bullet Prakash as temple visitor (uncredited)

== Soundtrack ==
Soundtrack was composed by Rajesh Ramanath. The songs "Enge Sellum", "Namma Sethuvukku", "Vidiya Vidiya" and "Vaarthai Thavari Vittai" from the original film were retained here as "Yaaro Yaaro", "Namma Kichanige", "Tirugo Tirugo" and "Maathu Thappidalu", respectively. Sudeep was dissatisfied with Sonu Nigam's, a non-Kannadiga, rendition of "Usire Usire" and asked Rajesh Ramanath if Rajesh Krishnan could sing the song.

All lyrics are written by K. Kalyan.

Track listing
No.	Title	Singer(s)	Length
1.	"Yaaro Yaaro"	K. J. Yesudas	05:23
2.	"Hudgiro Hudgiro"	Gurukiran, chorus	05:17
3.	"Namma Kichchanige"	Badri Prasad, Sadhu Kokila	02:36
4.	"Jakkanakka Jakkanakka"	Malgudi Subha	04:52
5.	"Maathu Thappidalu"	K. J. Yesudas	02:44
6.	"Usire Usire"	Rajesh Krishnan, Nanditha	05:40
7.	"Usire Usire"	Sonu Nigam, Nanditha	05:40
8.	"Tirugo Tirugo"	Badri Prasad	1:12

== Reception and legacy ==
A critic from Sify gave the film a verdict of above average and wrote that "The newcomer Sudeep is promising as Kicha, Rekha as Shobita is not impressive". A critic from Online Bangalore wrote that "Overall, Huchcha can be termed to be a nicely made movie and one can go for it without second thoughts". A critic from Indiainfo wrote that "Overall, the remake is good work by the whole team".

Following the film's release, Sudeep earned the fan-given sobriquet "Kiccha" Sudeep after the nickname of his character.

== Accolades ==
At the 49th Filmfare Awards South, Huchcha received nominations for Best Film, Best Director (Om Prakash Rao), Best Actress (Rekha Vedavyas) and Best Music Director (Rajesh Ramanath) and Sudeep won for Best Actor.
