= Yada Yada Hi Dharmasya =

Indian action drama film

- Theatrical release poster
- Directed by: Viraj
- Written by: Viraj
- Produced by: Akshara Tiwari; Vishal Tiwari
- Starring: Vijay Raghavendra; Viraj; Shravya Rao; P. Sai Kumar
- Cinematography: Shankar
- Edited by: K M Prakash
- Music by: Judah Sandhy; Parag Balavalli
- Production company: Akshara Productions
- Release date: 29 March 2019
- Country: India
- Language: Kannada

Yada Yada Hi Dharmasya (or simply Dharmasya) is a 2019 Indian Kannada-language action drama film directed by Viraj and starring himself, Vijay Raghavendra, Shravya Rao and P. Sai Kumar. The film was released after a three year delay to negative reviews.

== Cast ==
- Vijay Raghavendra as Dharma
- Viraj as Jeeva
- Shravya Rao as Aishwarya
- P. Sai Kumar as Maari
- Sadhu Kokila
- Padma Vasanthi as Jeeva's mother
- Rockline Sudhakar
- Prajwal Devaraj in a cameo appearance
- Mamatha Rahuth in a cameo appearance

== Production ==
The film's muhurat took place on 15 April 2016.

== Music ==
Yada Yada Hi Dharmasya

Soundtrack album by: Judah Sandhy; Parag Christopher
- Released: 2019
- Genre: Feature film soundtrack
- Length: 11:38
- Language: Kannada
- Label: Lahari Music
External audio
- Yada Yada Hi Dharmasya – Jukebox on YouTube

The film has songs composed by Judah Sandhy and Parag Christopher.

Track listing
No.	Title	Lyrics	Music	Singer(s)	Length
1.	"Eno Agidhe"	Viraj, Giridev	Parag Christopher	Chinmai, Supriya Lohith	3:54
2.	"Duniyana Gelloke"	Viraj	Parag Christopher	Shashank Sheshagiri	3:35
3.	"Hudgirandre"	Abhi Kanasina Kavana	Judah Sandhy	Abhi	4:09
Total length:					11:38

== Reception ==
A critic from The Times of India rated the film one-and-a-half out of five stars and wrote that "Yada Yada Hi Dharmasya has an underworld subject, which is laced with love and emotions. But it fails to work. It has a much-used subject in Sandalwood, which doesn't keep you hooked. The content should have been stronger to make the right impact". A critic from Asianet News rated the film two out of five stars and wrote that "'Dharmasya' seems to have been made with the calculation that if there are five or six fights, three or four songs, love, comedy, message and a little family sentiment, the film can win. It has them all, but the 'soul' it should have is missing!"
