= Chakravarthy (2017 film) =

2017 Indian Kannada action crime film directed by Chintan A V

- Theatrical release poster
- Directed by: Chintan A V
- Written by: Chintan A V
- Produced by: Anaji Nagaraj
- Starring: Darshan; Deepa Sannidhi; Aditya; Srujan Lokesh
- Cinematography: K. S. Chandrashekar
- Edited by: K. M. Prakash
- Music by: Arjun Janya
- Production companies: CSD; Veera Films
- Distributed by: Veera Films through Thoogudeepa Distributors
- Release date: 14 April 2017
- Country: India
- Language: Kannada

Chakravarthy (transl. Emperor) is a 2017 Indian Kannada-language action crime film written and directed by Chintan A.V. It stars Darshan, Deepa Sannidhi, besides Srujan Lokesh and Aditya, playing key supporting roles. The film's music score and soundtrack was composed by Arjun Janya, while cinematography and editing were handled by Chandrashekar K S and K. M. Prakash.

The project commenced in May 2016 at Mysore and subsequently shot exclusive scenes at Bangkok and Malaysia. The film was released on 14 April 2017 with the shows beginning at midnight.

== Plot ==
Shankar is care free guy having a habit of hunting Tigers in Kodagu. After his father, who is a retired army officer, sends him to Bengaluru in a search of a job, he decides to wipe out Bengaluru underworld rowdies with the help of Shetty and ACP Suryakanth. Gangster life, from the 1980s to today, is represented in this movie.

== Cast ==
- Darshan as Shankar aka Chakravarthy
- Deepa Sannidhi as Shanti
- Aditya as ACP Suryakanth (Hunter)
- Kumar Bangarappa as Sharad Shetty
- Yashas Surya as Doctor
- Srujan Lokesh as Kittappa
- Sharath Lohitashwa
- Shawar Ali as Bombay Diwan
- Charulatha as Bhavana, Kumar's wife
- Siddhanth as InterCop
- Shivadhwaj as Don Oil Kumar
- Dinakar Thoogudeepa as Maharaja
- Sadhu Kokila
- Chi. Guru Dutt as Appaji aka D. Devaraj Urs
- Ashok
- Ramesh Bhat
- Cudavalli Chandrashekar
- Vanishree as Saabakka
- Ishita Vyas in a cameo appearance in the song "Naughty Girl"

== Production ==
=== Development ===
The film has been under production development since early 2008. Script and dialogue writer Chintan who had finally succeeded by choosing his "mentor" Darshan as his lead actor for the project. Chintan had previously collaborated with Darshan as a writer for the films such as Saarathi and Ambareesha. For the financial aid, he chose Saarathi producer Sathyaprakash to invest in his new project. Reportedly, Darshan had been paid an advance by Sathyaprakash to star in the film after he completed Ambareesha film. The film was in development hell throughout the year 2015 as Darshan got busy with his previous commitments. In early 2016, the project was revived with the producer Sathyaprakash dropping out from the project due to undisclosed reasons. Another actor turned producer Siddhanth along with producer Anaji Nagaraj took over the project in May 2016 and announced the official launch of the film would be on the 24th of the same month.

=== Casting ===
In 2014, Chintan, along with producer Sathyaprakash, approached Darshan to star in the lead role for which he signed in and gave his dates only after completing his projects like Ambareesha and Jaggu Dada. Upon his availability in April 2016, the film crew went on with the process of casting. Actress Anjali was cast for the leading role in April 2016. But soon after, after the official launch of the film at Mysore, she walked out of the project citing issues with the team which got irked due to her delayed presence for the shoot. In the same month, the team roped in actors Auditya and Srujan Lokesh to play important supporting roles with the former being selected to play a cop role. Darshan's brother-director Dinakar Thoogudeepa was chosen to make his acting debut as an antagonist through this film. After the ouster of Anjali, the female lead search ended up with Deepa Sannidhi chosen to make her comeback to Kannada films after a brief hiatus. Actor-turned-politician Kumar Bangarappa was added to the star cast in September 2016 to play an antagonist role. According to the director, all the shots featuring him would be filmed in Malaysia, and his schedule would start from mid-September 2016. Actress Ishita Vyas was signed in to feature in an item song for the film.

=== Filming ===
After the official launch of the film on 25 May 2016 at Mysuru, the filming began on 26 May with a huge set erected at the Premier studios. Darshan's first look of sporting a vintage 1980's looks was revealed soon after the shooting began. After wrapping the first schedule involving actors Deepa Sannidhi and Srujan Lokesh, the team released the first look of the film, with Deepa sporting a retro look, clad in a sari. Her character name was revealed as Shanti, and that she would be an important part of Chakravarthy's life. The filming went on at a brisk pace until early September when the shooting was stalled due to the Cauvery river dispute in Karnataka. To express solidarity, Darshan suggested the team to refrain from shooting during that time. The team flew to Bangkok for three days to shoot some song sequences. The next schedule involving actors Darshan, Kumar Bangarappa, and Srujan Lokesh were canned in Malaysia. In October 2016, a poster showing Darshan in a blonde hair look was released and received positive response.

== Music ==
Arjun Janya has been signed on to compose the original score and soundtrack for the film. Arjun was being told to bring the retro effect in his soundtrack so as to recreate the 1980s–90s era. For this, he roped in a Mysore-based "Bharath Brass" band who are more popular for their Mysore Dasara cultural activities.

== Soundtrack ==
Chakravarthy

Soundtrack album by Arjun Janya
- Released: 15 January 2017
- Recorded: 2016
- Genre: Feature film soundtrack
- Length: 19:27
- Label: Anand Audio
- Producer: Arjun Janya

Arjun Janya composed the film's background and scored for its soundtrack. The lyrics for the soundtrack were penned by V. Nagendra Prasad and Umesh. The soundtrack album consists of five tracks, including one theme song.

Track listing
| No. | Title | Lyrics | Artist(s) | Length |
|---|---|---|---|---|
| 1. | "Chakravarthy" | V. Nagendra Prasad | Vyasraj | 3:39 |
| 2. | "Matthe Maleyagide" | Dr. Umesh | Sonu Nigam, Shreya Ghoshal | 4:51 |
| 3. | "Naughty Girl" | | Rita | 3:46 |
| 4. | "Ondu Malebillu" | V. Nagendra Prasad | Armaan Malik, Shreya Ghoshal | 4:42 |
| 5. | "Chakravarthy Theme" | | Arjun Janya | 2:29 |
| Total length: | | | | 19:27 |

== Release ==
=== Promotion ===
The trailer of the film was released on 29 March 2017. The two-minute trailer featured no dialogues and, as revealed by the director prior to the release, was "cut with around 200 shots, which also includes the cruise, a jetski, a chopper and highlights with music and effects in the background."

== Critical response ==
The writer Shashiprasad SM of Deccan Chronicle rated the film 1.2/5 stars and stated that "Probably a similar film made in the past, which was 'quite' impressive, spoils the fun of watching this one. "And described the performance of the characters that "Darshan has poured his acting skills to his best, but largely the making of it and probably a similar film made in the past."

The writer Shyam Prasad of Bangalore Mirror rated the film 3/5 stars and stated that "Darshan's maturity shows in some scenes and he is as convincing a screen don anyone can be. Dinakar reminds of his father Toogudeepa Srinivas. Arjun Janya's music adds value to the film and so does the presence of a top-star cast that includes Aditya, Kumar Bangarappa and Srujan Lokesh. Chintan makes a promising debut as a commercial movie director. Chakravarthy may not be the best, even in terms of a commercial potboiler, but it has enough ammunition to be a cracker for Darshan's fans."

The writer Sunayana Suresh of Times of India rated the film 2.5/5 stars and stated that "Darshan looks like he has given his all for the film, what with sporting multiple looks and dedicating many days to live his role as Chakravarthy. Sadly, his effort seems futile at times, because of the amateurish narrative. One could have had a rather slick, edgy story that re-creates a partly fictionalized version of the Bangalore underworld. Instead, the makers have fallen prey to some usual tricks adopted in commercial capers that dilute the second half. But, if you're the sort who wants a treat of masala moments on screen, this could be worth your visit to the screens."

== Accolades ==
- Filmfare awards south 2018:-
  - Filmfare Award for Best Male Playback Singer – Kannada— Armaan Malik— Ondu Malebillu— Won
