= Siddhanth =

Indian actor and medical doctor (born 1973)

Anand Gollahalli Shivaprasad
- Born: 19 October 1973 (age 52); Gollahalli, Tumkur, Karnataka, India
- Other names: Siddhanth; Sounding Star
- Education: JJM Medical College (M.B.B.S.); University of Leeds (M.H.A.)
- Occupations: Actor & Producer
- Years active: 2008–present
- Spouse: Malini
- Children: 2
- Parent(s): Dr G. Shivaprasad; Gangambika Mayanna
- Relatives: Dr G. Parameshwara (Paternal Uncle)

Dr. Anand Gollahalli Shivaprasad, also known as Dr. G. S. Anand (born 19 October 1973), better known by his stage name Siddhanth, is an Indian actor who appears in Kannada cinema. He is a medical doctor by profession.

== Early life and education ==
Siddhanth was born to Gangambika and Dr G. Shivaprasad as a second child, he was brought up in a village called Gollahalli (now renamed as Siddhartha Nagar) in Tumkur. His Primary & Secondary education, was at Sarvodaya School in Tumkur, followed by P. U. College from Sarvodaya P. U. College and then went on to study M.B.B.S. in JJM Medical College, Davangere, Later, he obtained an M.H.A. Degree from the University of Leeds in the United Kingdom.

== Career ==
=== Administrative career ===
After his studies, he came back to India, to look after Sri Siddartha Dental College as Administrative Officer. Later, he became a member to Sri Siddhartha Education Society, which was run by his family.

=== Film career ===
He started acting from 2008 as the main lead in Minchu.

Siddhanth's Shankaracharya film with Duniya Vijay was stopped in the controversial started by Akhila Karnataka Brahmana Maha Sabha and Sringeri Mutt objections to the title by filing the complaint before Karnataka Film Chamber of Commerce.

== Personal life ==
Siddhanth married his childhood friend Malini and has a son named Rishon. Siddhanth is the nephew to Dr G. Parameshwara.

== Filmography ==
Year	Film	Role	Ref.
2009	Minchu	Ganesh	
2012	AK 56	Ajay	
2013	Chatrapathi	Chatrapati Shivaji	
2017	Chakravarthy	InterCop	
