= Rose (2014 film) =

Rose (ರೋಸ)
- Directed by: Sahana Murthy H. S.
- Written by: Sahana Murthy
- Story by: Sahana murthy
- Produced by: Tarun Shivappa
- Starring: Ajay Rao; Shravya Rao
- Cinematography: Guruprashanth Rai
- Edited by: K. M. Prakash
- Music by: Anoop Seelin
- Distributed by: Sri Bhyaraveshwara Film Planet
- Release date: 4 July 2014
- Running time: 2 hours 38 minutes
- Country: India
- Language: Kannada

Rose is a 2014 Kannada romantic drama film starring Ajay Rao and Shravya Rao. The film is directed by Sahana Murthy and produced by Tarun Shivappa. The music for the film is composed by Anoop Seelin. The film is set for a simultaneous release in India and Australia on 4 July 2014. The story is about a man who takes blame for the crime which was not committed by him but once out of prison, has to face the wrath of a gangster with whom he had crossed swords while in jail.

The film was launched in May 2013 and is an intense emotional love story involving the Rose flower as a central character. The filming took place around Bangalore, Mysore and went abroad to shoot three songs.

== Cast ==
- Ajay Rao as Ajai (credited as Ajay Krishna Rao)
- Shravya Rao as Amrutha
- Sadhu Kokila
- Bullet Prakash
- Mico Nagraj
- Sudha Belawadi
- Pavitra Lokesh
- Aruna Balraj
- Saikumar Pudipeddi as Jailer
- Petrol Prasanna
- Shankar Ashwath
- Muni
- Patre Nagaraj
- Cudavalli Chandrashekar
- Girija Lokesh
- Malathi Mysore
- Harish Rayappa
- Cockroach Sudheer
- Rockline Sudhakar

== Soundtrack ==
The audio of the film was launched in January 2014 in Bangalore. The event was attended by the cast and crew of the film. Anoop Seelin has composed five tracks for the film.

No.	Title	Singer(s)	Length
1.	"Ye Huduga"	Sreeram Chandra, Supriya Lohith
2.	"Navilugariyondu"	Anoop Seelin
3.	"Preethige Rose Andaru"	Nakul Abhyankar, Sunitha Gopuraju
4.	"Sorry Ri Sorry"	Sreeram Chandra, D. S. Shwetha
5.	"Yenla Boddadde"	Raj Guru, Varijashree Venugopal
6.	"Navilugariyondu"	Haricharan
7.	"Sorry Ri Sorry"	Anoop Seelin, D. S. Shwetha

== Reception ==
A critic from The Times of India wrote that "While the first half of the film doesn't have much to offer, it gains momentum in the second part, keeping the audience hooked".
