= Katte (film) =

- Directed by: Om Prakash Rao
- Screenplay by: Om Prakash Rao
- Based on: Kedi Billa Killadi Ranga (Tamil)
- Produced by: A. M. Umesh Reddy
- Starring: Nagashekar; Chandan Kumar; Shravya Rao; Rukshar Dhillon
- Cinematography: V. Ravikumar
- Edited by: Lakshman N. Reddy
- Music by: S. A. Rajkumar
- Production company: Sri Renuka Movie Makers
- Release date: 3 April 2015
- Country: India
- Language: Kannada

Katte is a 2015 Indian Kannada-language political comedy film directed by Om Prakash Rao and starring Nagashekar, Chandan Kumar, Shravya Rao, and Rukshar Dhillon with Srinivasa Murthy and Avinash in supporting roles. The film is a remake of the 2013 Tamil-language film Kedi Billa Killadi Ranga.

== Cast ==
- Nagashekar as Nagu
- Chandan Kumar as Chandu
- Shravya Rao as Sandhya
- Rukshar Dhillon as Shanthi
- Geetha
- Ravitheja
- Om Prakash Rao
- Srinivasa Murthy as Chandu's father
- Avinash as Nagu's father
- Sathyajith
- Lakshman
- Danny
- Mico Nagaraj as Nethralaya Nagaraj
- Prashanth
- Mallesh
- Michael Madhu

== Production ==
Nagashekar plays a rural politician in the film. Om Prakash Rao's daughter Shravya Rao worked under him for the first time and played a girl next door and was paired opposite Nagashekar. Chandan Kumar and Rukshar Dhillon (credited as Vriksha) were paired opposite each other. The film was shot in Srirangapatna and Melukote. The shoot was completed in 38 days.

== Soundtrack ==
All music is composed by S. A. Rajkumar, and it was released under the Anand Audio music label. Puneeth Rajkumar was the chief guest at the film's audio launch.

Track listing
No.	Title	Lyrics	Singer(s)	Length
1.	"Devva Devva"	V. Nagendra Prasad	Ranjith, S. A. Rajkumar	3:57
2.	"Sanihake"	V. Nagendra Prasad	Udit Narayan, Shweta Mohan	4:21
3.	"Venkteshwara"	V. Nagendra Prasad	Suchitra, Sujith Suresh	4:13
4.	"Saavira Daiva"	K. Kalyan	Vijay Yesudas	4:27
5.	"Kalla Kaakaro"	Arasu Anthare	Haricharan	3:41
Total length:				20:39

== Reception ==
G S Kumar of The Times of India rated the film 2.5/5 stars and wrote, "A mediocre movie with no logic, Katte is like old wine in a new bottle". A critic from Sify wrote, "Overall, it's an entertaining comic tonic, advisable to watch only once". A critic from the Deccan Herald wrote, "Watch Katte, which evokes memories of late Shankar Nag’s Malgudi Days with trains criss-crossing every frame". A critic from Prajavani wrote that instead of glorifying the hero, director Omprakash Rao has taken a different path to show that he is also an ordinary young man. The reviewer added that Katte does not go beyond the boundaries of being ordinary. A critic from Bharatstudent.com rated the film 2.5/5 and wrote, "Overall, the film has nothing new to offer but there were few good moments".
