= Adyaksha =

2014 film directed by Nanda Kishore

- Poster
- Directed by: Nanda Kishore
- Screenplay by: Nanda Kishore
- Story by: Ponram
- Based on: Varuthapadatha Valibar Sangam
- Produced by: B. Basavaraju; A. Venkatesh; B. K. Gangadhar
- Starring: Sharan; Hebah Patel; Chikkanna
- Cinematography: Sudhakar S. Raj
- Edited by: K. M. Prakash
- Music by: Arjun Janya
- Production company: Shree Shankara Movies
- Distributed by: Ramu Enterprises
- Release date: 15 August 2014
- Country: India
- Language: Kannada

Adhyaksha (transl. President) is a 2014 Indian Kannada-language romantic comedy film written and directed by Nanda Kishore. It stars Sharan, Hebah Patel, Chikkanna, P. Ravi Shankar, Malavika Avinash and Ramesh Bhat. It is a remake of the Tamil film Varuthapadatha Valibar Sangam. A spiritual sequel titled Adyaksha in America was released in 2019. A sequel Upadhyaksha starring Chikkanna in the lead role was released in 2024.

== Plot ==
The film begins with police arriving at Shivarudre Gowda's (P. Ravi Shankar) house questioning him about the killing of his daughter Aishwarya (Hebah Patel) after she had run away with the guy she loved. Chandru (Sharan) and Narayana (Chikkanna) are two friends who are the leaders of a group called Chi Thu Sangha. Chandru falls in love with Kalyani (Asmita Sood) who is a schoolteacher. Chandru writes a love letter to her, but wants someone to give it to her which is when he finds Aishwarya. Aishwarya gives the letter to her teacher who refuses Chandru's proposal but Aishwarya doesn't reveal it to Chandru.

Gowda fixes a marriage for Aishwarya, but she is not willing to marry because of her desire to study further. Despite her attempts, nothing stops her marriage. Her marriage was posted on a billboard and Chandru and Narayana decide to stop it. They go to the police station and threaten the police that they will go to the commissioner. The police inspector talks to Gowda and makes him stop the marriage. This ignites Aishwarya's love for Chandru. She tricks him into getting many gifts to her in the name of Kalyani. One day, Aishwarya delivers the news to Chandru that Kalyani is getting married. He decides to move on in life. He debates with Shivarudre Gowda on organizing record dance during village festival and succeeds in doing so. On the day of the festival, seeing Aishwarya's draped in a sari, he falls in love with her. At the fest, Gowda takes on Chandru's challenge and dances to modern songs. The same night, the police reveal to him that the person who stopped Aishwarya's marriage was Chandru.

A day later he tells her about his love for her but she ignores him and says no to test his patience. Chandru walks away listening to a sad song when a gang comes and bashes him. He later finds out that it was Shivarudre Gowda's gang of goons who attacked him. So, Chandru and Narayana decide to steal Gowda's gun what he considers his 'soul'. They get into trouble having stolen it. Chandru returns the gun on Aishwarya's insistence without anyone knowing. Aishwarya's mother, aware of their affair, warns her that this is not correct and she should stop it. Gowda's cow falls into a well when he goes out of town and Chandru helps to get it out. One night, Chandru stays with Aishwarya in her house and they see her father sleepwalking and again the following morning too. This time he is awake but Chandru thinks he's sleepwalking again and so he tells Gowda about liking his daughter. Once he finds out that he is indeed awake, he runs out of that house.

Gowda makes his daughter promise that she would marry a boy of his choice. They fix a marriage for Aishwarya but on the night before her marriage, she decides to run away with Chandru. When running away at night, they see her father and he tells them to run away and gives them some money so that they never come back. Shivarudre Gowda wants Chandru and Aishwarya to run away because he doesn't want Aishwarya to marry the guy he has chosen for her and he can't stop her marriage because he has too much respect in his village. He watches them get married and then he walks home with blood on his shirt (the blood is of a goat that he killed) and lies to everyone that he killed his daughter because of his reputation. Chandru and Aishwarya return though and ruin Shivarudre Gowda's plans and Chandru stated that he returned because his father offered him more money. The film ends with Gowda and Chandru laughing happily.

== Cast ==
- Sharan as Chandrashekhara "Chandru" Gowda
- Hebah Patel as Aishwarya (credited as Raksha)
- Chikkanna as Narayana Gowda
- P. Ravi Shankar as Shivarudre Gowda
- Veena Sundar as Lakshmi, Aishwarya's mother
- Asmita Sood as Kalyani (guest appearance)
- Malavika Avinash as Lady Sub-inspector of police
- Ramesh Bhat as Chandru's father
- Satyajit
- Kuri Prathap
- Rockline Sudhakar
- Dharma
- Umesh Punga
- Mithra as Lawyer Gunavantha
- Karisubbu as Manthravadi Manjanna
- Venkata Rao
- Akki Channabasappa
- B. Thimmegowda
- Roopashree
- Prem in a special appearance in song "Phonu Illa"
- Srinagar Kitty in a special appearance in song "Phonu Illa"
- Srimurali in a special appearance in song "Phonu Illa"
- Nanda Kishore in a special appearance in song "Phonu Illa"

== Soundtrack ==
Adyaksha

Soundtrack album by Arjun Janya
- Released: 6 June 2014
- Genre: Feature film soundtrack
- Length: 20:19
- Language: Kannada
- Label: D Beats
- Producer: Arjun Janya

The music for the film and soundtracks were composed by Arjun Janya. The album has five soundtracks.

Tracklist
No.	Title	Lyrics	Singer(s)	Length
1.	"Adhyaksha Adhyaksha"	V. Nagendra Prasad	Puneeth Rajkumar, Vijay Prakash	4:29
2.	"Kannigu Kannigu"	K. Kalyan	Tippu, Archana Ravi	4:02
3.	"Open Hairsu Bitkondu"	Yogaraj Bhat	Vijay Prakash	3:52
4.	"Phonu Illa"	Yogaraj Bhat	Vijay Prakash	4:26
5.	"Sum Sumne"	K. Kalyan	Palak Muchhal	3:30
Total length:				20:19
