= Mayanagari =

Indian thriller film

- Directed by: Shankar Aradhya
- Produced by: Shivashankar N
- Starring: Aniissh Tejeshwar; Teju; Shravya Rao
- Cinematography: Srinivas
- Edited by: Vijay M Kumar
- Music by: Arjun Janya
- Production company: Sandalwood Pictures
- Release date: 15 December 2023
- Country: India
- Language: Kannada

Mayanagari is a 2023 Indian Kannada-language thriller film directed by Shankar Aradhya and starring Aniissh Tejeshwar, Teju and Shravya Rao. The film was released to mixed-to-positive reviews.

== Cast ==
- Aniissh Tejeshwar as Shankar
- Teju as Varalakshmi
- Shravya Rao as Mallika
- Dwarakish as Dwarakish
- Chikkanna
- Avinash
- Sharath Lohitashwa
- Suchendra Prasad as the police inspector
- Rockline Sudhakar
- Edakallu Guddada Mele Chandrasekhar
- Kari Subbu

== Production ==
This is the director's second film after 18th Cross (2012). The film began production more than six years prior to 2023 and the CGI work took one year to complete. The film was initially titled Nagarakatte. Shravya Rao was in PUC while working on this film. The film's delay was caused by COVID-19.

== Reception ==
A critic from The New Indian Express rated the film two-and-a-half out of five stars and wrote that "What initially seems ordinary gradually unfolds into an intricate tale, engaging the audience as layers of the story unravel". A critic from The Times of India rated the film three out of five stars and wrote that "Director Shankar Aradhya displays his filmmaking acumen by maintaining an engaging storyline, despite the film's shortcomings. Though not without flaws, Mayanagari emerges as a compelling choice for crime thriller enthusiasts". A critic from Cinema Express wrote that "The film orchestrates a clash between aspiration and despair within a thrilling and horror quest. What initially seems ordinary gradually unfolds into an intricate tale, engaging the audience as layers of the story unravel". A critic from Bangalore Mirror wrote that "All in all, the movie Mayanagari is worth watching for those who crave suspense thrillers". A critic from Asianet News rated the film three out of five and wrote that "The director is clear about what he has to say. There is an image accordingly. There are ups and downs in writing. Curiosity has a saving quality. Along with that, Anish has excelled with many acting varieties". A critic from Udayavani wrote that "If the story has to be told in one line, it is a tale of lust and greed. The director has tied it in his own style. The desire of the director to leave out the regular elements and make a good movie is evident". A critic from Prajavani wrote that "The director had the opportunity to tie the entire film to the horror genre. In the first half, the director's attempt to make it a commercial film by adding unnecessary love and fight scenes did not work".
