= Malavika Avinash =

Indian spokesperson, actress, television personality and politician

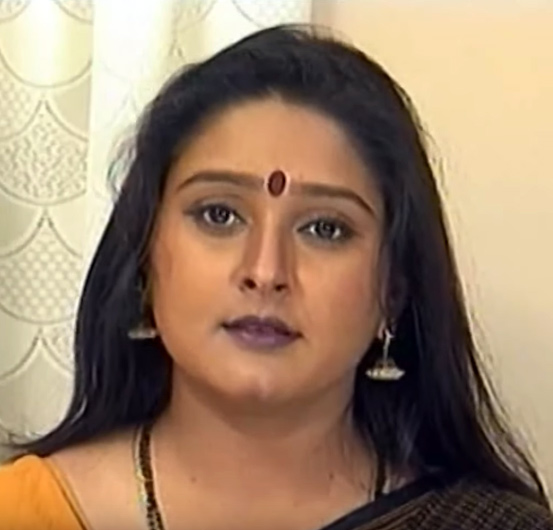
- Malavika Avinash in 1998 Kannada serial Mayamruga

Spokesperson of Bharatiya Janata Party of Karnataka
- Incumbent
- Assumed office February 2014
- President: Nalin Kumar Kateel

Personal details
- Born: Madras, Tamil Nadu, India
- Party: Bharatiya Janata Party (2013–present)
- Spouse: Avinash (m. 2001)
- Children: 1
- Education: Bangalore University
- Occupation: Actress; politician

Malavika Avinash is an Indian spokesperson, actress, television personality and politician of Bharatiya Janata Party of Karnataka. She is known for her work in Kannada, Malayalam and Tamil films.

== Early life ==
Malavika was born in a Tamil family to N. Ganesan from Thanjavur. Her father was a banker and writer, and her mother, Savithri, a vocalist and dancer. She was initiated into classical arts under the tutelage of Padmashree Leela Samson in Bharatanatyam and Pandit Partho Das on the sitar. G. V. Iyer spotted her at a dance performance as Krishna and cast her as Krishna in his Krishnavataar. She then played a lead role as a princess in Prema Karanth's Panorama children's film Nakkala Rajakumari.

She completed her Bachelor of Law at Bangalore University and was awarded 3rd rank.

She married actor Avinash in 2001. They have a son named Ugaala.

== Career ==
Her introduction to the limelight began early with acclaimed performances, most notably in the Kannada film Krishnāvatāra in 1988. She garnered acclaim for her roles in Malayalam and Kannada cinema, working under directors like Lenin Rajendran. Her television career flourished with memorable roles in series directed by stalwarts like Girish Karnad and Ashutosh Gowariker in Hindi, Ashok Naidu in Kannada, and Dinesh Baboo in Malayalam. Notably, her portrayal in the Kannada series Mayamruga solidified her place as a household name.

Transitioning to Tamil cinema, Malavika Avinash made a significant impact with roles in films like K. Balachander's Anni, where she played the lead. Her versatility and dedication further shone through in various serials and films across languages.

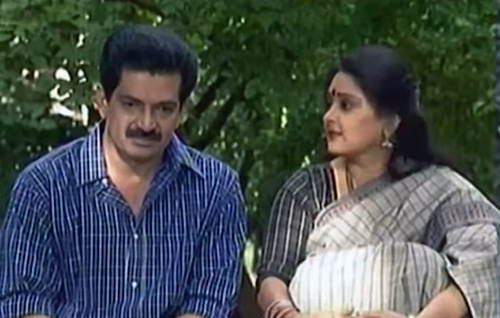
Avinash (left), Malavika Avinash (right) in 1998 Kannada serial Mayamruga

Another milestone was her portrayal of Nanjamma, the protagonist in Girish Kasaravalli's Kannada film of S. L. Bhyrappa's celebrated novel, Gruhabhanga. Malavika's Tamil films and serials include Raja Rajeshwari and K. Balachander's Nilavai Pidippom where she portrayed a middle-class working woman, and in Comedy Colony again under her mentor Balachander. She played Madurai Thilaka in Arasi and Muththazhagi in Chellamey. She played key roles in Tamil films.

Agni, a talk show that Malavika hosted on E-TV Kannada was followed by Baduku Jataka Bandi. In the latter, Malavika deals with the problems of individuals, thereby providing an Alternate Dispute Resolution forum for resolving family issues. She also discusses social issues. She was one of the contestant in Bigg Boss Kannada Season 4.

Malavika Avinash has built a strong reputation across Indian cinema and television. She has excelled in powerful supporting roles, often portraying characters such as lawyers, politicians, and strong-willed maternal figures.

=== Journalism ===
Malavika participated in and won many international moot courts as a student, served as editor of her college journal, joined Madhyam, a development communications organization, served as assistant-editors of Madhyam journal, a legal column for the Times of India and UDAYAVANI for two years, her "Malavika Pakkam" column in Kumudam, a Tamil weekly, an Agony aunt column for Kumudam and more recently, 'Malavika order', a weekly column in Vijaya Karnataka. Malavika served as head of programming at Zee Kannada.

== Dance ==
Malavika's association with Bharatanatyam commenced at age five when her mother introduced it to her. She trained under M. R. Krishnamurthy of Kalakshetra, followed by advanced tutelage under Padmashri Leela Samson in Delhi. She was a recipient of the CCERT (a unit of the Culture Ministry) scholarship for Bharatanatyam. She pursued dance along with her dancer sister, an alumnus of Kalakshetra, Ranjani Ganesan Ramesh. As a duo they performed at cultural centres in India and abroad, including Hampi festival, Pattadakkal festival, Khujrajo festival, Chidambaram Natyanjali and Uttara Chidambaram. Together, they organise an annual dance festival called Arudhra at Bangalore.

Malavika served as a judge on TV dance shows and hosted Takadhimithaa, a game show dedicated to Bharatanatyam on JayaTV.

Malavika Avinash entered politics campaigning for BJP leader Sushma Swaraj in Bellary. She is a member of the BJP's Mahila Morcha. She joined Bharatiya Janata Party in September 2013 and was appointed one of its co-spokespersons in February 2014.

== Controversy ==
=== Sanitary pad controversy ===
Goods and Service Tax applied on sanitary napkins when items like bangles and sindhoor were exempted from the new tax system by the ruling Bhartiya Janata Party has come under criticism from women and men. In July 2017, Malavika defended the BJP and said that sanitary pads are not required as Multi-national corporations have been dumping sanitary pads in India since it was rejected by developed countries, Cloth is hygienic in contrast to sanitary pads. The defense of Malavika on the decision of her party to enforce GST on sanitary pads provoked a lot of backlash from people.

== Filmography ==
Year	Film	Role	Language	Notes
1988	Krishnaavataara		Kannada	
1989	Makkala Rajakumari	Rajakumari	Kannada	
1992	Daivathinte Vikrithikal	Elsie	Malayalam	
1993	Janam	Reshma	Malayalam	
1995	Kalyanothsava	Rashmi	Kannada	
1995	Samara	Sandhya	Kannada	
1995	Ravitheja	Teja	Kannada	
2003	Jay Jay	Meena	Tamil	
2005	Aaru	Vimala	Tamil	
2006	Aathi	Ramachandran's wife	Tamil	
2006	Dishyum	Malar	Tamil	
2006	Kalvanin Kadhali	Haritha's sister-in-law	Tamil	
2006	Cyanide	Shubha	Kannada	
2008	Jayamkondaan	Chandrika	Tamil	
2010	Irandu Mugam	Thilakavathy	Tamil	
2010	Huli	Bharathi	Kannada	
2011	Vanthaan Vendraan	Arjun and Ramana's mother	Tamil	
2012	Munjane	Manu's mother	Kannada	
2012	Dashamukha	Madhuri	Kannada	
2012	Drama	Gayathri	Kannada	
2012	Krantiveera Sangolli Rayanna	Goddess	Kannada	
2012	Yaare Koogadali	Kumara's stepmother	Kannada	
2013	Myna	Revathi	Kannada	
2013	Karodpathi		Kannada	
2014	Kalyanamasthu		Kannada	
2014	Adyaksha		Kannada	
2014	Mr. and Mrs. Ramachari	Sudha	Kannada	
2015	Ring Road		Kannada	
2016	Mukunda Murari	TV interviewer	Kannada	
2016	Shivalinga	Police commissioner	Kannada	
2017	Bairavaa	Judge	Tamil	
2018	Huccha 2		Kannada	
2018	K.G.F: Chapter 1	Deepa Hegde	Kannada	
2018	David		Kannada	
2019	Boomerang	Siva's mother	Tamil	
2019	Kaithi	Nalini	Tamil	Uncredited role
2021	Rudra Thandavam	Judge	Tamil	
2021	Enemy	Arundhati Mohan	Tamil	
2021	Sakath	Judge	Kannada	
2022	K.G.F: Chapter 2	Deepa Hegde	Kannada	
2022	Captain	Major Kavitha Nair	Tamil	
2024	Love Li	Dr. Shashikala	Kannada	
2025	Just Married		Kannada	
2025	Middle Class	Dr. Malathy	Tamil	
2026	Ram and Leela	Ram's mother	Tamil	

== Television career ==
Serials

Year	Title	Role	Language	Channel	Note(s)
1995	Chinna Chinna Aasai-Uravu	Pooja	Tamil	Sun TV	
1998–2000	Mayamruga	Malavika	Kannada	DD Chandana	
2001	Micro Thodar Macro Sinthanaigal - Ayirathil Oruvanum Nooril Oruthiyum	Kamali	Tamil	Raj TV	
2001–2002	Manvantara	Gargi	Kannada	ETV Kannada	
2001–2003	Gruhabhanga	Nanjamma	Kannada	ETV Kannada	
2001–2003	Anni	Angayarkkani	Tamil	Jaya TV	
2004–2005	Chidhambara Ragasiyam	Thulasi	Tamil	Sun TV	replaced by Devadarshini
2004–2006	Raja Rajeshwari	Raja Rajeshwari	Tamil	Sun TV	replaced by Abitha
2005–2006	Nilavai Pidippom	Thenmozhi	Tamil	Raj TV	
2008–2009	Comedy Colony	Chellamma	Tamil	Jaya TV	
2008–2009	Arasi	Madurai Thilakavathy	Tamil	Sun TV	replaced by Sudha Chandran
2008–2010	Mukta	SP Madhavi Patel	Kannada	ETV Kannada	
2009–2013	Chellamey	Muthazhagi	Tamil	Sun TV	
2019	Magalu Janaki	Sheela Bhushan	Kannada	Colors Kannada	
2021	Kaatrukkenna Veli	Saradha	Tamil	Star Vijay	Replaced by Jyothi Rai
2021	Paaru	Mahalakshmi	Kannada	Zee Kannada	Special Appearance
2022–2024	Kannedhirey Thondrinal	Rudra	Tamil	Kalaignar TV	
2022	Mathe Mayamruga	Malavika	Kannada	Siri Kannada	
2025	Getti Melam	Rajeshwari	Tamil	Zee Tamil	Special Appearance
2025	Idhayam	Muthulakshmi	Tamil	Zee Tamil	Special Appearance
2025	Jai Lalitha	Herself	Kannada	Star Suvarna	Special Appearance

Shows

Year	Title	Role	Language	Channel	Note(s)
2010–2011	Baduku Jataka Bandi	Host	Kannada	Zee Kannada	
2012	Kaiyil Oru Kodi - Are You Ready?	Contestant	Tamil	Sun TV	
2014	Mahaparva	Judge	Kannada	ETV Kannada	
2015	Aradirali Belaku	Host	Kannada	Udaya TV	
2016–2017	Bigg Boss Kannada	Herself	Kannada	Colors Kannada	As contestant; season 4
2022	Jodi No 1	Judge	Kannada	Zee Kannada	
2022	Comedy Khiladigalu and Jodi No 1 Mahasangama	Judge	Kannada	Zee Kannada	
2023–2024	Jodi No 1 Season 2	Judge	Kannada	Zee Kannada	
