= Tantiram =

Tantiram: Chapter 1: Tales of Shivakasi
- Directed by: Muthyala Meher Deepak
- Written by: Shabaz MS, Wineeth Ponnuru
- Produced by: Srikanth Kandragula ( Shree Tej SK )
- Starring: Srikanth Gurram; Priyanka Sharma; Avinash Yelandur
- Cinematography: Sirugudi Vamsi Srinivas
- Edited by: Sirugudi Vamsi Srinivas
- Music by: Ajay Arasada
- Production company: Cinema Bandi
- Release date: 13 October 2023
- Country: India
- Language: Telugu

Tantiram: Chapter 1: Tales of Shivakasi is a 2023 Indian Telugu-language film directed by Muthyala Meher Deepak, produced by Srikanth Kandragula (Shree Tej SK ) under Cinema Bandi Banner. The film stars Srikanth Gurram, Priyanka Sharma and Avinash Yelandur in the lead roles.The Music of the Movie was composed by Ajay Arasada, cinematography and editing by Sirugudi Vamsi Srinivas. The screenplay was written and co-directed by Wineeth Ponnuru and Shabaz MS, with Wineeth Ponnuru also serving as the executive producer.

== Plot ==
The narration starts with the story of Ahalya, the most beautiful woman in the universe, who was created by Brahma. The narrator then talks about jinns and how some jinns terrorise humans to mate with unsuspecting women.

The story moves to the present time Hyderabad where a few friends are drinking together and telling each other horror stories. One of them, Ajay, tells the story of Balachandran, a man traumatised since his mother eloped, deeply mistrusts women. Under the pressure of his father, he marries Alagini, which turns him into a jovial and loving person and he starts treating his female employees better. The Jinn, a supernatural entity who lived in the firecracker factory Bala's family owned, takes control of him, causing him to lose trust and face horrific consequences.

The Jinn overhears the women at the factory discussing how beautiful Alagini is and tries to attract Bala's attention. Bala keeps getting nightmares, and as Alagini tries to comfort him, and he slowly starts overcoming his fears and biases. One day, Alagini visits Bala at the factory, and the jinn lusting after her starts manipulating Bala. The Jinn tells Bala that his father doubts on his ability to run the factory, but if he agrees to give the jinn a few drops of Alagini's blood, the Jinn will help him to become rich and successful. Despite hesitating at first, Bala drugs his wife and steals a few drops of her blood to offer to the jinn. The Jinn licked her blood and told Bala that he is leaving forever and will not return until Bala calls it. Bala's wish is granted and his business starts expanding and within a year he started building a new factory. But Bala grows greedy and calls the jinn again, asking for more wealth and riches. But this time, the Jinn asks to mate with Alagini instead of her blood. A furious Bala refuses and tries to bargain with the jinn. He tries to send the jinn away, but the jinn refuses, saying Bala could call the jinn but he cannot send it back. It warns Bala that if it can make him rich, it can destroy him too. Shortly after, a government ban on firecrackers was implemented, and that badly affected Bala's business. He moves all his stock and equipment inside the new factory. Very soon, it rained very hard and destroyed everything in the new factory, which had a poorly built base. Desperate to save his fortune, he goes to ask the jinn for help. The jinn again asks to get intimate with Alagini again, and Balachandran refuses. The jinn mocks him, saying that his wife has been unfaithful to him and asks him to ask her about a person named Kailash. When he asks Alagini, she assures him that Kailash was just her childhood friend whom she liked as a teen, but nothing happened between them because Kailash never intended to marry Alagini.

Bala feels ashamed for doubting his wife and goes back to tell the jinn that he was wrong to believe what it said. The jinn convinces him by showing him a vision of Alagini with Kailash. Driven by anger and rage, a confused Bala asks his father for advice. His father tells him to let the jinn take his wife, because that's what he did as well. Bala realises that his mother didn't elope, but decides to sacrifice Alagini because he considers herself impure.

Balachandran asks Alagini to dress up as a newly wed bride for a puja he wants to conduct at the factory. When they reach the factory, the jinn thanked Bala for doing what it asked for. As it engulfs Alagini in flames, Bala accuses Alagini of lying to him. Alagini reminds him of their first night together, where there was blood on the bed they consummated, proving her innocence and virginity. She also informs him that she was pregnant. A devastated Bala tries to plead to the jinn, but the jinn mocks him and leaves with Alagini.

Bala goes home to meet his father, who asks him if the deal is done. Bala doesn't answer and suffocated his father to death with a pillow, blaming him for the death of his mother and Alagini. He later kills himself in the same factory.

As Ajay finished the story, his friends ask him where did this happen, and Ajay says that it happened right where they are. Realising that they are in the same factory where Bala and Alagini died, his friends panic. The ending shows a flash of a burning Alagini.

== Cast ==
- Srikanth Gurram as Balachandran
- Priyanka Sharma as Alagini
- Avinash Yelandur as Adhiban
- Srinivasa Murthy as Jinn (Voiceover)
- Kalidindi (KP)
- Shiva Prased
- Leela Venkatesh
- Dileep Kumar
- Nani kumar
- Ashasujay
- Steffi Louise
- Sukanya Gadavir

== Production ==
Director of the film mentioned that this is a "novel" horror story. The film was shot in Kerala and various locations in India. Later the trailer of the film was released on 13 September 2023. The film received U/A from the Censor Board and was released in five languages in theatres worldwide.

== Reception ==
A critic from News18 Telugu stated that it was a "Psychology action thriller with mythology" and rated it two point five out of five.
