= AK 56 =

- Poster
- Directed by: Om Prakash Rao
- Screenplay by: Om Prakash Rao
- Produced by: Sheetal Shettiyar; Moti Tolani; Kunal Tolani
- Starring: Siddhanth; Sherin; Sumalatha; Sharat Babu; Atul Kulkarni; Lokanath
- Cinematography: S. Manohar
- Edited by: Lakshman Reddy
- Music by: Abhiman Roy
- Production company: Silver Screen Pictures
- Release date: 10 February 2012
- Country: India
- Language: Kannada

AK 56 is a 2012 Indian Kannada-language action film written and directed by Om Prakash Rao. It was produced by Silver Screen Pictures and released on 10 February 2012.

== Cast ==
- Siddhanth as Ajay
- Sherin
- Sumalatha as Gowri
- Sharat Babu
- Atul Kulkarni as Saleem
- Saurav Lokesh
- Sardar Sathya as Ajay's friend

== Production ==
=== Filming ===
Principal photography began on 15 September 2009. The team successfully completed the final schedule at on 29 January 2010.

== Music ==
AK 56

Soundtrack album by Abhimann Roy
- Released: 2012
- Recorded: 2012
- Genre: Feature film soundtrack
- Length: 22:02
- Language: Kannada

Official audio
- AK 56 - Full Album on YouTube

Track listing
No.	Title	Singer(s)	Length
1.	"Kaddu Kaadu"	Abhiman Roy, Yashaswini.A Roy	5:22
2.	"Karedaaga"	Sonu Nigam	4:32
3.	"Pasandaithi Gelathi"	Avinash Chebbi, Ananya Bhagath	4:44
4.	"Adjust Madko"	Rita, Avinash Chebbi	4:32
5.	"Mera Bharath"	Ramanujam L.R	3:32
Total length:			22:02

== Reception ==
=== Critical response ===
A critic from The Times of India scored the film at 3 out of 5 stars and wrote "Shirin, with her lively performance, is sure to entertain youngistan. Sumalatha and Sharathbabu are graceful. Music by Abhiman Roy has some foot-tapping numbers". A critic from Deccan Herald wrote "Suchendra Prasad gets to showcase his worth yet again, but only just. Some of the dialogues put the brakes on the thinking processes. But when the viewer can be satisfied with a) the chase scene b) the pleasant songs and c) another close-up of the KRS in all its barren glory, things like ‘values’ recede into oblivion quite naturally". Atul Chaturvedi from Bangalore Mirror wrote "Sterling acts by Sumalatha, Loknath, Suchindra Prasad and Atul Kulkarni add power to the film. Abhiman Roy music has two good tunes and S Manohar captures the richness well. If you have enjoyed at least one of Rao’s previous films, AK56 is the film for you". A critic from Rediff.com wrote "Suchendra Prasad walks away with the acting honours for his powerful dialogue delivery as a cop. Sumalatha, Sharath Babu, Atul Kulkarni and Lokanath are adequate. Shobhraj and Kote Prabhakar add value as the baddies. AK 56 is one of the best films made by Omprakash; it is better than his decade-old film AK 47". A critic from News18 India wrote "Songs composed by Abhiman Roy are unimpressive. Manohar is good behind the camera. 'AK 56' may look for action film lovers only, but the film has too many flaws". Y Maheswara Reddy from DNA wrote "Even music director Abhiman Roy has done a neat job with the song Kadhu Kadhu Noodthaale. All criticism aside, for all those who enjoy good action films, this could definitely spice up your weekend".
