= Shravya Rao =

Indian actress

- Occupation: Actress
- Years active: 2013-present
- Parent(s): Om Prakash Rao; Rekha Das

Shravya Rao is an Indian actress who works in Kannada and Telugu-language films.

== Personal life and career ==
She is the daughter of director Om Prakash Rao and actress Rekha Das. She decided against appearing in one her father's directorial and decided to go through auditions. She debuted with Loosegalu (2013) and then appeared in Rose (2014) opposite Ajay Rao in the role of a Brahmin girl. Regarding her performance in the film, a critic wrote that "Shravya steals the shows with her brilliant portrayal of Ammu". She then starred in Katte (2015) directed by her father and portrayed the role of a girl next door.

She made her Telugu debut with Vanavillu (2017). At the request of her father, she starred in Huccha 2, which was directed by him. Regarding her performance in the film, a critic noted that she was "cute". She changed her name to Saathvika Rao in 2023 for the film Athi I Love You.

== Filmography ==
Year	Title	Role	Language	Notes
2013	Loosegalu		Kannada	
2014	Rose	Amrutha	Kannada	
2015	Katte	Sandhya	Kannada	
2016	Whatsupp Love		Kannada	Special appearance
2016	Possible	Madhu	Kannada	
2017	Vanavillu	Shravya	Telugu	
2018	Huccha 2	Kushi	Kannada	
2018	Nanjundi Kalyana	Vindhya	Kannada	
2019	Natana	Janaki	Telugu	
2019	Yada Yada Hi Dharmasya	Aishwarya	Kannada	
2023	Athi I Love You	Athira	Kannada	
2023	Mayanagari	Mallika	Kannada	
