= Chatrapathi (2013 film) =

- Chatrapathi Kannada Movie Poster
- Directed by: Dinesh Gandhi
- Written by: V. Vijayendra Prasad
- Based on: Chatrapathi by S.S.Rajamouli
- Produced by: Dinesh Gandhi
- Starring: Siddhanth; Priyadarshini
- Cinematography: Dasari Seenu
- Edited by: S. Manohar
- Music by: M. M. Keeravani; Rajesh Ramnath
- Production company: S. S. Combines
- Release date: 27 December 2013
- Country: India
- Language: Kannada

Chatrapathi (Kannada: ಛತ್ರಪತಿ) is a 2013 Indian Kannada-language action film directed and produced by Dinesh Gandhi. It stars Siddhanth, Priyadarshini, and Bhanupriya in the main lead. The film is a remake of Telugu film of the same name, which starred Prabhas and Shriya Saran. M. M. Keeravani, the composer of the original version, recreates his compositions in Kannada version.

== Plot ==
Sivaji and Ashok are the sons of Parvati. Sivaji is her stepson, but Parvati shows equal affection to both of them. Her biological son, Ashok, is jealous of the affection that Sivaji gets. The family lives on the coast of Sri Lanka. One day, these villagers are forced to evacuate the coast due to a raging fire. Ashok's lies to his mother that Sivaji has died in the fire. As the family escapes the inferno, Sivaji is separated from his family. He ends up in a different boat and lands in Vizag port. He is brought up in the port itself, but his search for his mother never ceases. In that process, he comes across Neelu. Here, the port is dominated by Baji Rao and some goons using refugee labor for their own gain. Sivaji is an aggressive guy but is controlled by his well-wishers. One day, he reacts aggressively in defense of himself and the other refugees. People start calling him Chhatrapati. Meanwhile, Ras Bihari comes down to Vizag in the hunt for Sivaji since he killed his brother Baji Rao. Ashok, too lands in the same place. Realizing that Sivaji is his brother, he joins hands with the bad guys. The story is then of Chhatrapati, who is searching for his mother, and has a bunch of bad guys, including his brother, on his back while the entire port looks up to him.

== Cast ==
- Siddhanth as Shivaji aka Shivu
- Priyadarshini
- Bhanupriya as Shivaji's step-mother
- Rachana Maurya
- Mithra
- Dilip
- Harry Jose (Mumbai)
- Khetan
- Honnavalli Krishna

== Soundtrack ==
Chatrapathi

Soundtrack album by M. M. Keeravani
- Released: 2013
- Recorded: 2013
- Genre: Feature film soundtrack
- Language: Kannada

Official audio
- Chatrapathi - Full Album on YouTube

Track listing
| No. | Title | Singer(s) | Length |
|---|---|---|---|
| 1. | "Kalla Banda Kalla" | Akanksha Badami, Santhosh |
| 2. | "Bellane Haalu Baalige" | Akanksha Badami, Santhosh |
| 3. | "Mannu Yaako Thinthiya Krishna" | Akanksha Badami |
| 4. | "Miss Call Kodathi Yaake" | Akanksha Badami, Santhosh |
| 5. | "Gandu Ee Gandige" | Harsha, Akanksha Badami |

== Reception ==
=== Critical response ===
A critic from The Times of India scored the film at 2 out of 5 stars and says "Siddhanth has a long way to go to prove his mettle as an actor. Priyadarshini is not used well. While Bhanumathi has done a good job, Mitra’s comic avatar is a disaster. The less said the better about the rest". B S Srivani from Deccan Herald wrote "But the one who steals the show is Jaidev, with his mean streak making the role interesting. Sadly, the director’s ineptitude doesn’t help the film’s cause. But Manju’s fans can rejoice for the slick, violent fight pieces. Elsewhere, this Chatrapathi stumbles bad".
