= Nanda Kishore =

Indian film director

- Born: 29 March 1981; Sagara, Karnataka, India
- Occupations: Film director, screenwriter
- Parent(s): Sudhir; Malati
- Relatives: Tharun Sudhir (brother)

Nanda Kishore is an Indian film director and screenwriter who works in Kannada film industry. He is known for directing films like Victory (2013), Adyaksha (2014), Ranna (2015) and Pogaru (2021).

== Family ==
Nanda Kishore is the son of Kannada film actor Sudhir, and Malati. His brother, Tharun Sudhir, is also a film director, in Kannada cinema.

He overcame his obesity problem by losing 76 kg (168 lb) of weight.

== Filmography ==
Key
†	Denotes films that have not yet been released

Year	Film	Language	Notes
2013	Victory	Kannada	
2014	Adyaksha	Kannada	Remake of Tamil film Varuthapadatha Valibar Sangam
2015	Ranna	Kannada	Remake of Telugu film Attarintiki Daredi
2016	Mukunda Murari	Kannada	Remake of Hindi film OMG: Oh My God!
2017	Tiger	Kannada	
2018	Brihaspathi	Kannada	Remake of Tamil film Velaiilla Pattadhari
2021	Pogaru	Kannada	
2022	Raana	Kannada	Remake of Tamil film Thadaiyara Thaakka
2025	Vrusshabha	Telugu	Partially reshot in Malayalam

As an actor

Year	Film	Notes
2013	Victory	Cameo appearance in song "Khaali Quarter Bottle"
2014	Adyaksha	Cameo appearance in song "Phonu Illa"
2015	Ranna	Cameo appearance in song "Seereli Hudugeena"
2016	Mukunda Murari	Cameo appearance in song "Gopala Baa Baa"
2017	Tiger	Cameo appearance in title song "Tiger"
2018	Brihaspathi	Cameo appearance in song "Dammaru Dammaru"
2021	Pogaru	Cameo appearance in song title song "Pogaru"
