= Victory (2013 film) =

- Promotional poster
- Directed by: Nanda Kishore
- Screenplay by: M. S. Sreenath
- Story by: M. S. Sreenath
- Produced by: SRS Media Vision; Anand Audio
- Starring: Sharan; Asmita Sood; Avinash; Ravishankar
- Narrated by: Jaggesh
- Cinematography: Shekar Chandra
- Edited by: K. M. Prakash
- Music by: Arjun Janya
- Production company: SRS MEDIA VISION
- Distributed by: Jayanna Combines
- Release date: 23 August 2013
- Running time: 158 minutes
- Country: India
- Language: Kannada
- Budget: ₹2.5 crores

Victory is a 2013 Indian Kannada comedy film directed by Nanda Kishore and written by M. S. Sreenath. The film stars Sharan and Asmita Sood in the lead roles along with Avinash, Ravishankar and Ramesh Bhat playing supporting roles. Actress Ragini Dwivedi appears in one item dance number for the film. The film is produced by SRS Media Vision in association with Anand Audio, a popular audio company in Karnataka.

The film was an instant success at the box-office. The original score and soundtrack for the film was composed by Arjun Janya. One of the songs, "Khali Quarter", from the film went viral on the social media and was widely appreciated by celebrities and critics. The film premiered in the US through producer Atlanta Nagendra on 6 September 2013, and was widely appreciated. It was observed that the storyline of the movie was similar to that of 1995 Kannada movie Ganeshana Galate which itself was based on the 1978 movie The Odd Job. The movie was remade in Telugu in 2016 as Selfie Raja starring Allari Naresh. The movie had a sequel titled Victory 2 released in 2018 in which he played a quadruplet thereby becoming the second Indian actor after Kamal Hassan to play such a role.

== Plot ==
The film starts with Chandru (Sharan) marrying Priya (Asmita Sood) and on the very first night of their marriage they get separated as she is made to believe that Chandru is a womeniser. Dejected by this, Chandru attempts suicide several times, but in vain. He finally hires a local Don "Mafia" (Ravishankar) and gives him a week's time to kill him. Meanwhile, Priya returns to Chandru realizing her mistakes and wants to live with him happily. But by then, Mafia who is reluctant to kill Chandru, realises that he is a look a like of his childhood friend Munna and he immediately plans to earn some money by killing Chandru & claiming his life insurance amount. Meanwhile Veerabhadra (Keerthi Raj) is on the verge of taking revenge on DCP Rajendra's family. What follows is the comical twists and turns on how Chandru escapes from the don and re-unites with Priya.

== Cast ==
- Sharan as Chandru & Munna (Double character)
- Asmita Sood as Priya, Chandru's wife
- Ravishankar as Mafia, a local goon
- Tabla Nani as Chinthamani Choornananda, Chandru's uncle
- Keerthiraj as Veerabhadra, a local Rowdy
- Avinash as DCP Rajendra & Priya's Father
- Sadhu Kokila as Inspector Sadhu Gowda
- Kuri Prathap as a Police constable
- Ramesh Bhat as DCP Rajendra's friend
- Ragini Dwivedi as Maya, Munna's love interest (Also a special appearance in the item number "Yakka Nin Maglu")
- Mimicry Dayanand as Astrologer
- Girija Lokesh as DCP Rajendra's Mother & Priya's Grand mother
- Chikkanna
- Rani Damukumar
- Apoorva
- Rachana Gowda
- Akki channabasappa
- Arasu Maharaj as one of Mafia's henchman
- Mithra as Snake Charmer
- Rockline Sudhakar
- Mandeep Rai as Doctor
- Sangamesh Upaase as Receptionist in Doctor's clinic
- Cool Chinna
- Nanda Kishore in a cameo appearance in song "Khali Quarter"

== Production ==
Actor turned debutant director Nanda Kishore, son of yester-year actor Sudheer, announced his maiden project and titled it as "Victory". He roped in Sharan as the main protagonist who tasted big success from Rambo released in 2012. One of the unit members reported that the film would be a comic-caper and would engage the audience for its complete length. Model-turned-actress Asmita Sood who was a Miss India finalist in 2011, was signed up for her first Kannada film to play the lead role opposite Sharan.

== Soundtrack ==
Victory

Soundtrack album by Arjun Janya
- Released: 20 May 2013
- Genre: Feature film soundtrack
- Label: Anand Audio

Owing to the success of the previous venture, Rambo, the audio company Anand Audio, which also returned to film production, once again teamed up with music director Arjun Janya and actor Sharan for this film. Arjun composed four tracks for the film out of which one repeats in male and female versions. Well known lyricists such as Jayanth Kaikini, Yogaraj Bhat, K. Kalyan and Kaviraj wrote the lyrics for the songs. Popular yester-year playback singer L. R. Eswari made a comeback by rendering her voice for a dance song in this film.

The single "Khali Quarter" from the soundtrack sung by Vijay Prakash and written by Yogaraj Bhat went viral on the online video sharing sites and was widely considered as one of the most successful songs of 2013.

No.	Title	Lyrics	Singer(s)	Length
1.	"One Two Za Two"	K. Kalyan	Arjun Janya
2.	"Kanna Minche Jaahirathu"	Jayanth Kaikini	Sonu Nigam, Anuradha Bhat
3.	"Khali Quarter Baatli Hange Lifeu"	Yogaraj Bhat	Vijay Prakash
4.	"Vone Vone"	Kaviraj	Mika Singh, Sangeetha
5.	"Yakka Nin Magalu"	Shivu Byargi	L. R. Eswari, Kailash Kher
6.	"Kanna Neere Jaahirathu"	Ghouse Peer	Anuradha Bhat

== Response ==
Victory opened to a tremendous response at the box office. All across the Karnataka State, the film was declared a blockbuster hit within the first week of its release. Even before the release, the film created a news by selling the satellite rights at a record price of ₹ 2.5Crores to a Kannada channel. This price itself was the total production cost of the film and further the distribution sales were at the record selling price which made the film a blockbuster all over. The first week collections mounted about ₹6Crores while the first weekend collections were about ₹2.6Crores.

== Reception ==
=== Critical response ===
A critic from The Times of India scored the film at 3 out of 5 stars and says "Sharan has again proved that he is a hero material with his brilliant performance. Asmitha Sood has done a good job. Ravishankar is as excellent in comedy roles as in villain's roles. Ragini's dance sequence and Arjun Janya's music are the highlights. Shekhar Chandra as captured some eye-catching scenes in his camera". B S Srivani from Deccan Herald wrote "Victory, however, leaves two questions unanswered: One, was the Akka nin maglu song really necessary? Second, who played Chandru's aunt — Sharan himself or...?". A critic from Sify.com wrote "Music by Arjun Janya may not be top class, but one song Khaali Quarter (lyrics penned by Yograj Bhat) has become a chartbuster. Ragini Dwivedi has performed an item number in the movie and it fails to live up to the expectations. This movie is definitely for those who want a change in their routine life by laughing for a couple of hours".
