= Raam (2005 film) =

2005 film by Ameer

- Poster
- Directed by: Ameer
- Written by: Ameer
- Produced by: Ameer
- Starring: Jiiva; Saranya Ponvannan; Gajala
- Cinematography: Ramji
- Edited by: Raja Mohammad
- Music by: Yuvan Shankar Raja
- Production company: Teamwork Production House
- Release date: 4 March 2005
- Running time: 131 minutes
- Country: India
- Language: Tamil

Raam is a 2005 Indian Tamil-language mystery thriller film written, produced and directed by Ameer. The film stars Jiiva, Gajala and Saranya Ponvannan, with Kunal Shah, Rahman, Ganja Karuppu and Murali playing supporting roles. It revolves around the title character, an autistic young man who is close to his mother but becomes the prime suspect in her murder case.

The film was released on 4 March 2005 and became a sleeper hit. It was screened at the 2006 Cyprus International Film Festival, where it won two awards, for Best Actor and Best Musical Score, for Jiiva and Yuvan Shankar Raja, respectively. The film was critically acclaimed with praise for the performances of Jiiva and Saranya, screenplay, music and cinematography. The film was remade in Hindi as Bolo Raam (2009) and in Kannada as Huccha 2 (2018).

== Plot ==
In Kodaikanal, Raam is an autistic young man who shares a close relationship with his mother, Saradha. The film begins with both of them found lying in a pool of blood. Saradha is dead, while Raam is still alive. Believing that Raam may have murdered his mother, the police arrest him. Police Inspector Umar begins investigating the case.

Through flashbacks, it is revealed that Raam had mental health difficulties from a young age and was later diagnosed with autism. He is extremely attached to his mother and has a strong sense of justice. Saradha often worries that his inability to tolerate wrongdoing may get him into trouble. In the past, Raam had also killed a man who attempted to rape and forcibly marry a young woman.

Karthikayeni, the daughter of Sub-Inspector Malaichamy, lives near Raam and develops feelings for him. Raam does not return her affection. Malaichamy strongly disapproves of his daughter's feelings for Raam. After learning about them, Malaichamy argues with Raam and Saradha, calls Raam "retarded", and threatens to have him arrested on a false charge.

During the investigation into Saradha's death, Umar learns about Karthikayeni's feelings from Vaazhavandan, a close friend of Raam and Saradha. When questioned, Karthikayeni tells Umar about her father's opposition to her feelings for Raam and his argument with Raam and Saradha.

Umar eventually discovers that Karthikayeni's brother, Satish, is the real murderer. Satish is addicted to drugs, and Saradha had discovered his addiction. After Malaichamy insulted Raam by calling him mental, Saradha confronted Satish and threatened to reveal his drug addiction to his father. Fearing that his secret would be exposed, Satish attacks Saradha in a fit of rage and stabs her. He then flees, leaving Saradha to die from her injuries.

Umar and Malaichamy later discover that Satish is responsible for the murder and track him down. Malaichamy initially asks Umar to let his son go, but Umar convinces him that Satish must face the consequences of his crime. Satish manages to escape after taking Umar's gun, killing Umar and shooting his father. Malaichamy survives the shooting and is taken to the hospital. After recovering, he tells the police what happened and asks them to protect Raam from Satish.

Raam learns that Satish killed his mother after following Umar and Malaichamy during their investigation. Determined to avenge Saradha's death, he searches for Satish and eventually finds his hideout. Karthikayeni also arrives and begs Raam not to kill her brother. However, overwhelmed by memories of his mother, Raam shoots Satish several times with Umar's gun, killing him.

The film ends with the police approaching the hideout while Raam sits meditating on the rooftop of a dilapidated building.

== Cast ==
- Jiiva as Ramakrishnan "Raam"
- Saranya Ponvannan as Saradha
- Gajala as Karthikayeni
- Rahman as Inspector Umar
- Kunal Shah as Satish
- Murali as Sub-Inspector Malaichami
- Ganja Karuppu as Vaazhavandhan
- Prathap Pothan as a Psychiatrist
- Dinesh (special appearance in the song "Boom Boom")
- Aruldoss as Reporter (uncredited)

== Production ==
Ameer revealed that while he was working on Nandhaa (2001) as an assistant director, he got to witness a report in a local news channel where a 20-year-old man was shown sitting near his mother's corpse, feeling remorse for murdering her. This triggered Ameer to make a film on that incident; however, he decided not to portray the son as a murderer. Jiiva, who was in search of story for his third film, met cinematographer Ramji who informed him that Ameer wanted to make a film with him which prompted Jiiva to meet him and agreed to act under his direction after hearing the script and character. Ameer decided to produce the film on his own after the initial producers who produced Ameer's debut Mounam Pesiyadhe (2002) withdrew. To portray his character, Jiiva grew his hair long, had to remain blank and did a lot of recce and also met a person who had autism and observed his mannerisms. The filming was primarily held at Kodaikanal where sets were built on land belonging to Jiiva's family. The scene where Jiiva meditates was shot at Dolphin Nose, Kodaikanal. The film took nearly two years to complete.

== Soundtrack ==
The music was scored by Yuvan Shankar Raja. The soundtrack features seven tracks, including one instrumental. All lyrics were penned by Snehan.

Track listing
No.	Title	Singer(s)	Length
1.	"Boom Boom"	Yuvan Shankar Raja, Jyotsna, Premji Amaran, Tippu	4:36
2.	"Aarariraro"	K. J. Yesudas	4:46
3.	"Vidigindra Pozhudhu"	Srimathumitha	3:59
4.	"Yaaro Arivaal"	Madhu Balakrishnan	2:26
5.	"Manidhan Solgindra"	K. J. Yesudas, Vijay Yesudas, Ranjith	4:41
6.	"Nizhalinai Nijamum"	Vijay Yesudas, Yuvan Shankar Raja	5:21
Total length:			25:49

== Critical reception ==
Malathi Rangarajan of The Hindu wrote, "Crafted with care and treated with finesse, Raam is a luminous feather in the maker's cap". Visual Dasan of Kalki called Raam a miracle cure for rotten taste. M. Bharat Kumar of News Today wrote "Director Ameer needs to be applauded for coming up with a gripping emotional melodrama detailing the travails of an autistic boy, which is sure to impress movie buffs. Engrossing screenplay by the director himself, excellent cinematography by Ramjhi [sic] and good background score by Yuvan Shankar Raja add strength to the movie".

== Accolades ==
At the 2006 Cyprus International Film Festival, Jiiva won the award for Best Actor in a Feature Film, and Yuvan won for Best Musical Score in a Feature Film. He remains the only Indian to have received that award to date.
