= Rekha Das =

Indian film actress

- Born: Karnataka, India
- Occupation: Film actress
- Spouse: Om Prakash Rao (divorced)
- Children: 1

Rekha Das is an Indian actress in the Kannada film industry. Some of the notable films of Rekha Das as an actress include Shwethaagni (1991), Shanti Kranti (1991), and Hoovu Hannu (1993).

== Personal life ==
She was married to Kannada film director and producer Om Prakash Rao and has a daughter Shravya Rao who is also an actress.

== Career ==
Rekha Das has been part of more than six hundred and fifty films and many television series in Kannada. She and comedian Tennis Krishna, have acted in one hundred films together.

== Selected filmography ==
She has acted in over 100 films.

- Rudra Tandava (1990)
- Mruthyunjaya (1990)...Sridevi
- Gowri Kalyana (1991)
- Shanti Kranti (1991)
- Gopi Krishna (1992)
- Malashree Mamashree (1992)
- Aata Hudugata (1995)
- Karpoorada Gombe (1996)
- Ammavra Ganda (1997)
- Arjun Abhimanyu (1998)
- Mangalyam Tantunanena (1998)
- Aunty Preethse (2001)
- Friends (2002)
- Simhadriya Simha (2002)
- Galate Maduve (2002)
- Prema Qaidi (2002)
- Nagabharana (2003)
- Bisi Bisi (2004)
- Maurya (2004)
- Manasugula Mathu Madhura (2008)
- Godfather (2012)
- Aryan (2014)
- Saahasi Makkalu (2018)
- Drona (2020)

== See also ==
- List of people from Karnataka
- Cinema of Karnataka
- List of Indian film actresses
- Cinema of India
