= Om Prakash Rao =

Indian film director, screenwriter, producer, and actor

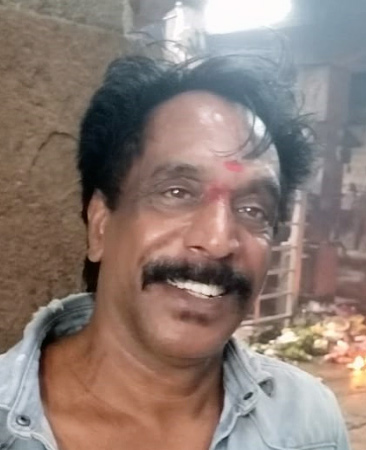
- Born: Bengaluru, Karnataka, India
- Occupations: Film director; screenwriter; producer; actor
- Spouses: Rekha Das (divorced); Denissaa Prakash (m. 2012)
- Children: 4, including Shravya

N. Om Prakash Rao is an Indian film director, screenwriter, film producer and actor who primarily works in Kannada film industry. He has, till date, directed about 47 films in Kannada language.

== Career ==
Om Prakash Rao's successful films such as Lockup Death (1996), Simhada Mari (1997), AK-47 (1999), Huchha and Kalasipalya (2004) have been huge blockbusters in Kannada cinema.

=== Controversies ===
Omprakash Rao was beaten up in Srirangapattina. The filmmaker, who was revealed as a director who took advantages of all actresses sexually, was said to have been physically abused for all his wrongdoings. The director couldn't even complete the shooting of his ongoing film. The film was said to have been stalled by angry people. Om Prakash Rao was said to have asked for sexual favours by actresses by offering them some top projects

Omprakash Rao and Guru Deshpande, and producers Diwakar Babu and Rajashekar, were caught on camera luring young girls with the promise of roles in films

== Personal life ==
Om Prakash Rao is the son of actor N. S. Rao and Yashodhamma. He has been married multiple times. His was first married to actress Rekha Das. Their daughter Shravya Rao is also an actress. Rao then married Nanda, and the couple had one child, daughter Kushboo. In 2001, he married actress Bhavya Premayya. He is presently married to Denissa.

== Filmography ==
=== As director ===
Year	Film title	Notes
1994	Palegaara	
1994	Lockup Death	
1994	Gold Medal	
1995	Emergency	
1997	Simhada Mari	
1997	CBI Durga	
1999	A. K. 47	Kannada- Telugu bilingual film
2001	Vande Matharam	
2001	Huchcha	Remake of Sethu; Nominated, Filmfare Award for Best Director
2002	Ninne Preethisuve	Remake of Nee Varuvai Ena
2003	Partha	Also producer
2003	Sachi	
2003	Annavru	Remake of Thalapathi
2004	Kalasipalya	
2004	Sahukara	Remake of Muthu
2005	Ayya	
2005	Thunta	
2006	Hubli	Also producer
2006	Mandya	Also producer
2009	Kannadadda Kiran Bedi	
2009	Yodha	Remake of Bose
2010	Sugreeva	
2010	Huli	
2011	Prince	
2012	AK 56	
2012	Bheema Theeradalli	
2012	Shiva	
2013	Election	
2014	Chandralekha	Remake of Prema Katha Chitram
2015	Katte	Remake of Kedi Billa Killadi Ranga
2018	Huccha 2	Remake of Raam
TBA	Thrishulam †	
TBA	Phoenix †	Also producer
TBA	Guerrilla War †	Also producer

=== As actor ===
Year	Title	Role	Note(s)
		1990	ganeshana maduve
1991	S. P. Bhargavi		
1992	Kaliyuga Seethe		
1993	Kempaiah IPS		
2002	Dakota Express	Sundar	
2003	Sachi		
2004	Kanakambari	Krishna	
2004	Aliya Mane Tholiya	Krishna	
2005	Pandu Ranga Vittala		
2006	Hatavadi		
2006	Aishwarya	proprietor of advertising company	
2007	Hetthare Hennanne Herabeku		
2008	Neenyare		
2008	Paramesha Panwala		
2008	Akasha Gange		
2008	Dheemaku		
2009	Abhay	Shastri	
2009	Devru		
2009	Thaakath		
2009	Yagna		
2010	Thipparalli Tharlegalu	Pandu	
2010	Shourya		
2010	Nanjanagoodu Nanjunda		
2010	Aithalakkadi		
2010	Khadak		
2011	Dhool		
2011	Prince		
2012	Golmaal		
2012	Dakota Picture		
2012	Kalpana	Priest	
2013	Topiwala		
2014	Fair & Lovely		
2014	Chirayu		
2014	Power		
2014	Typical Kailas		
2014	Savari 2		
2014	Agraja		
2014	Nimbe Huli		
2015	Katte		Cameo
2016	Mandya Star		
2018	Huccha 2		
2026	Jerax		

== External sources ==
- Om Prakash Rao at IMDb
