= Avinash Yelandur =

Indian actor (born 1959)

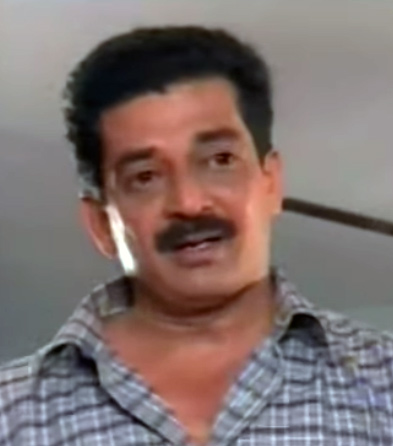
- Avinash in 1998 Kannada serial Mayamruga
- Born: Yelandur Narayan Ravindra; 22 December 1959 (age 66); Yelandur, Mysore State, India
- Education: University of Mysore
- Occupations: Actor; professor
- Spouse: Malavika (m. 2001)
- Children: 1

Yelandur Narayan Ravindra (born 22 December 1959), known mononymously by his stage name Avinash, is an Indian actor who appears predominantly in Kannada and Tamil films. He has been working in films for more than three decades. Known for his authentic portrayal of complex characters and versatility, Avinash is one of the most sought after actors for supporting roles.

== Early life ==
Avinash was born in the town of Yelandur in Mysore district (now in Chamarajanagar district), in the Mysore State (now Karnataka), to Indira and B. K. Narayana Rao, a lawyer. After completing his education at Mysore's Hardwick High School and College, Avinash went on to attend University of Mysore, where he obtained his master's degree in English literature. Drawn to theatre and cinema from a young age, he had an active theater life in Mysore and later in Bangalore. During the time, he taught English at the National Institute of Engineering, Mysore, and later at the MES college in Bangalore.

== Career ==
=== Theatre ===
His first job after his M.Phil. was that of an English lecturer in National Institute of Engineering, Mysore. He continued to teach at MES College Bangalore as one of the most popular lecturers of the college. However, soon his passion for theatre took him abroad to train in acting at Mermaid Theatre, London. On returning home, he worked in Kannada theatre as part of the renowned B Jayashree's troupe "Spandana" and with the Shankar Nag as part of his "Sanketh" for many years.

=== Films ===
Films were a natural choice for Avinash after his debut in G. V. Iyer's Madhvacharya (1986) based on the life and times of the twelfth-century enlightened master as the protagonist Madhvacharya, a film that won several National and State Awards. His debut in mainstream cinema however, was with Shivarajkumar's Samyuktha (1988), which went in to become a hit with audiences, ushering him into the world of South Indian Cinema. He has worked with more than 200 directors such as K. Balachander, Girish Kasaravalli, T. N. Seetharam, A. R. Murugadoss, Puri Jagannadh, P. Vasu, Vetrimaaran, Siva, Suseenthiran, Duniya Suri, Prashanth Neel, Gautham Vasudev Menon and T. S. Nagabharana.

His other notable performances were in Girish Kasaravalli's Dweepa (2002), in which he played the lead opposite Soundarya, T. S. Nagabharana's Chinnari Mutha (1993) and T. N. Seetharam's Mathadana (2001), all three of which won National Award. He also lists Singaaravva (2003) and Chigurida Kanasu (2003) among his most memorable films.

P. Vasu's hit horror series Apthamitra (2004), Chandramukhi (2005) and Aptharakshaka (2010) were high points in his career. 5Ters, an experimental (computer graphics) children's film in Hindi gave him the opportunity of playing good and evil characters and he considers the film to be a high point of his career.

Apart from his diverse repertoire, he has played major roles alongside doyens such as Rajkumar, Vishnuvardhan, Rajinikanth, Mammootty, stars such as Nagarjuna, Nandamuri Balakrishna, Venkatesh, Shiva Rajkumar, Vijay, Ajith Kumar, Vikram, Suriya, Puneeth Rajkumar, Kiccha Sudeep, Yash, Arya, Karthi, Mahesh Babu, Prithviraj Sukumaran and several of the younger stars of South Indian Cinema.

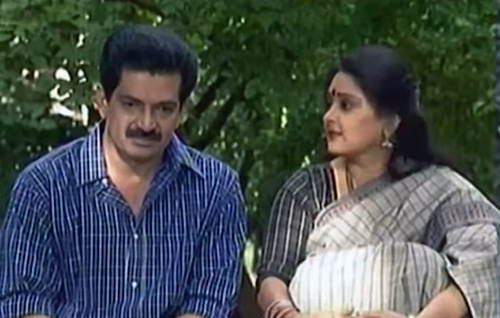
Avinash (left) and Malavika Avinash in 1998 Kannada serial Mayamruga

== Personal life ==
Avinash married Malavika, who was his co-star in the soap opera Mayamruga, in 2001. They have a son, Gaalav.

== Awards and nominations ==
Year	Award	Category	Work	Result	Ref.
2000–01	Karnataka State Film Award	Best Supporting Actor	Mathadana	Won	
2011	Filmfare Awards South	Filmfare Award for Best Supporting Actor – Kannada	Aptharakshaka	Won	
2018	Rajyotsava Award	Lifetime Achievement	—	Won	

== Partial filmography ==
=== Kannada films ===
Year	Film	Role	Notes
1985	Trishula	Damodar Rao	
1986	27 Mavalli Circle	P. R. Arunkumar	
1986	Madhvacharya	Young Madhvacharya	
1987	Aapadbandhava		
1987	Athiratha Maharatha		
1987	Ravana Rajya		
1987	Bandhamuktha	Prabhakar's friend	
1987	Sangrama		
1987	Agni Parva		
1988	Samyuktha	Gopal Rao	
1988	Krishna Mecchida Radhe		
1988	Daada	Vishnu's friend	
1988	Mathru Vathsalya	Shekhar	
1989	Ondagi Balu	Thyagaraj	
1989	Tarka	Cowry	
1989	Yuddha Kaanda	Dr. Hegde	
1989	Onti Salaga	Ramesh	
1989	Deva		
1989	Inspector Vikram	Rao	
1989	C.B.I. Shankar	Vikram	
1990	Ashwamedha	Muthanna	
1990	Kiladi Thatha		
1990	Mathsara	Somashekhar	
1990	Poli Kitty		
1990	Rudra Thandava		
1990	S. P. Sangliyana Part 2	Imposter of CBI officer	
1990	Swarna Samsara	Diwakar	
1990	Utkarsha	Mahendra	
1991	Hathya Kanda	Prasad	
1991	CBI Vijay	S.I. Harischandra	
1992	Pruthviraj	Inspector Rajashekar	
1992	Mannina Doni	Pradeep	
1992	Sangya Balya	Veeranna Setty	
1993	Chinnari Mutha	Saawanth	
1993	Aakasmika	Rijji	
1994	Nishkarsha	Ramakrishna	
1994	Lockup Death	Police Inspector	
1994	Kiladigalu	Chikkaraja	
1996	Huliya	Madagi	
1997	CBI Durga		
1998	Karnataka Police	Captain	
1999	Aryabhata		
1999	Drona	JD	
1999	Idu Entha Premavayya	Arun's brother	
1999	Hrudaya Hrudaya		
1999	Nannaseya Hoove		
1999	Om Namah Shivaya		
2000	Yajamana	Devaraj	
2001	Lankesha		
2001	Shaapa	Psychiatrist	
2001	Prema Rajya		
2001	Huchcha	Kiccha's brother	
2001	Vishalakshammana Ganda		
2001	Mathadana	Puttathammayya	Karnataka State Film Award for Best Supporting Actor
2001	Kotigobba	Keshava	
2002	Appu	Rajashekhar	
2002	Ninagagi	Dr. Subramanya	
2002	Karmugilu	Shankar	
2002	Balarama	Landlord	
2002	Kitty	Kitty's brother	
2002	Dweepa	Ganapa	
2003	Don	Ramaswamy Iyengar	
2003	Singaaravva	Saragam Desai	
2003	Sri Ram	Lokayuktha DCP Kshetrapal	
2003	Raja Narasimha		
2003	Thayi Illada Thabbali	Nanjappa	
2003	Chigurida Kanasu	Shanubhog	
2003	Khushi	Durga Prasad	
2003	Daasa		
2003	Mani		
2003	Mooru Manasu Nooru Kanasu	Anand's father	
2004	Veera Kannadiga	Vishwa	
2004	Durgi		
2004	Apthamitra	Acharya Ramachandra Shastri	
2004	Kalasipalya	Seetharam	
2004	Jennifer	Basha	
2005	Valmiki	Deshpande	
2005	Sirichandana		
2005	Aakash	Dayanand	
2005	Deadly Soma	Chinnaswamy	
2005	Siddu		
2005	Sye	Sivaji	
2005	Aadi	Udayachandar	
2005	Amrithadhare	Puru's Father	
2005	News	Umesh	
2005	Swamy	Desai	
2005	Green Signal		
2006	Mandya	Bhoopayya	
2006	Chellata	Chandrasekhar	
2006	Cyanide	Kempaiah IPS	
2006	Gandugali Kumararama		
2006	Sirivantha	Mastan Bhai	
2006	Tananam Tananam	Gowda	
2006	Kallarali Hoovagi	Parashuramappa	
2006	Shree		
2007	Hudugaata	S. K. Ananth Rao	
2007	Gunavantha		
2008	Manasugula Mathu Madhura		
2008	Bombaat	Ananthakrishnan	
2008	Baa Bega Chandamama	Poonacha	
2008	Chikkamagaloora Chikka Mallige		
2009	Kabaddi		
2009	Bellary Naga	Vishwanath Gowda	
2010	Police Quarters	Vishwanna	
2010	School Master		
2010	Porki	Satya Narayan Murthy	
2010	Aptharakshaka	Acharya Ramachandra Shastri	Filmfare Award for Best Supporting Actor – Kannada
2010	Prithvi	Narasimha Nayak	
2010	Jayahe	Sushilkumar	
2010	Preethi Hangama	Geetha's boss	
2011	Karthik		
2011	Double Decker		
2011	Hudugaru	Paramashiva Murthy	
2011	Paramathma	Srinivas	
2011	Putra	Narasimha	
2012	Shakti		
2012	Anna Bond	Major Chandrakanth	
2012	Romeo		
2013	Sandalwood Sa Re Ga Ma		
2013	CID Eesha		
2013	Jataayu		
2013	Victory	DCP Rajendra	
2013	Kaddipudi	ACP Vijaya Prasad	
2013	Madarangi	Deepu's father	
2014	Angaaraka		
2014	Ninnindale	Lakshmi Venkatesh	
2014	Ugramm	Shivarudra Lingaiah	
2014	Shivajinagara	Dayanand	
2014	Kalyanamasthu		
2014	Ragini IPS	Hiremath	
2014	Huchudugaru		
2014	Maryade		
2014	Veera Pulikeshi		
2014	Maanikya		
2014	Hara		
2014	Jasmine.5		
2014	Aakramana		
2014	Power		
2015	Katte	Nagu's father	
2015	Mrugashira		
2015	Vajrakaya	Viraj's adoptive father	
2015	Preethiyinda	Amar Kumar Pandey	
2015	Lodde		
2015	Mr. Airavata	Police Commissioner	
2015	Goolihatti		
2015	Dove		
2015	7		
2015	Ring Road Suma		
2015	Bettanagere		
2015	Alone		
2016	Bullet Rani		Bilingual film
2016	Jaguar	College Principal	Bilingual film
2016	Kotigobba 2	Landlord	
2017	Hebbuli	ACP Prathap	
2017	Raajakumara	Jagadeesh	
2017	Rogue		Bilingual film
2017	Dandupalya 2	Police Officer	
2018	Prema Baraha	Ram	
2018	Idam Premam Jeevanam		
2018	Ambi Ning Vayassaytho	Nandini's father	
2018	Gultoo	Inspector Avinash	
2018	Vaasu Naan Pakka Commercial		
2018	Victory 2	DCP Rajendra	
2018	Orange	Huli Veeraiah	
2019	Natasaarvabhowma	Avinash	
2019	Dasharatha		
2019	Akhaada		Only dubbed versions released
2019	Pailwaan	Rukumini's father	
2019	Katha Sangama		
2020	Mounam		
2020	Arishadvarga	Manjunath Bhat	
2020	Shivarjuna	Rayappa	
2020	Law	Nandini's father	
2020	Act 1978	Chief Minister of Karnataka	
2021	Roberrt	Omkar Shukla	
2021	Yuvarathnaa	Jayapal	
2021	Mugilpete		
2022	James	Army officer	
2022	Home Minister	Renuka's father	
2022	Shiva 143	Narasimha	
2023	Love Birds		
2023	Vidhi (Article) 370		
2023	19.20.21		
2023	Mariguddada Gaddadharigalu		
2023	Suraari		
2023	Siren	Police Commissioner Ashok Kumar	
2023	Yadha Yadha Hi	Avinash Bhat	
2023	Iravan	Dr Satya Murthy	
2023	Aparoopa		
2023	David		
2023	Sheela		
2023	Sapta Saagaradaache Ello – Side A	Shankare Gowda	
2023	Mayanagari		
2023	Kaatera	Shanubogha	
2024	Juni	Partha's father	
2024	Abbabba	Gopal Reddy	
2024	Bagheera	Ramakanth Appayya	
2024	Bhairathi Ranagal	Khandre	
2025	Guns and Roses		
2025	Choo Mantar	Acharya Ramachandra	Cameo appearance
2025	Forest	Mani	
2025	Rudra Garuda Purana		
2025	Unlock Raghava		
2025	Vaamana		
2025	Kothalavadi	Commissioner Ananta Padmanabha	
2025	Jambu Circus		
2025	I Am God		
2025	Jai Gadakesari		
2025	Flirt		

=== Tamil films ===
Year	Film	Role	Notes
2003	Thirumalai	Ashok	
2005	Chandramukhi	Ramachandra Acharya	
2006	Paramasivan	DGP Rajasekar	
2006	Vattaram	Karuppusamy	
2006	Poi	Valluvanar	
2007	Madurai Veeran	Vishvanathan	
2008	Velli Thirai	Reddy	
2008	Singakutty	Anjali's father	
2008	Satyam	Sathyam's father	
2008	Aegan	John's friend	
2010	Kanagavel Kaaka	Vel's Father	
2010	Siddhu +2	Pavithra's father	
2011	Siruthai	Bavuji	
2011	7 Aum Arivu	Pallava King	
2011	Rajapattai	Chidambaram	
2013	Udhayam NH4	Avinash Patel	
2014	Veeram	Aavudayappan	
2014	Meaghamann	Avinash Bhote	
2015	Killadi	SP Easwarapandiyan	
2015	Yennai Arindhaal	Hemanika's father	
2015	Sandamarutham		
2015	Vedalam	Rahul's assistant	
2016	Gethu	Craig's boss	
2016	Moondraam Ullaga Por	Subramaniam	
2018	Sollividava	Ram	
2019	Neeya 2	Ananda Siddhar	
2020	College Kumar	Kaliyamurthy	
2022	Sardar	Victor (Chetta)	
2022	Connect	Father Alex	
2023	Theedhum Soodhum Endhan Mugavari		
2025	Aaryan	DGP Ravi Chakrapani	
2026	Sardar 2	Agent Victor "Chetta"	

=== Telugu films ===
Year	Film	Role	Notes
2003	Golmaal	Abdullah	
2007	Lakshmi Kalyanam	Chalamaiah	
2008	Sangamam	Raghava Rao	
2009	Aa Okkadu	Swamy	
2010	Nagavalli	Acharya Ramachandra Siddhanthi	
2012	Daruvu	Shantaram	
2012	Damarukam	Aghora's chief	
2016	Bullet Rani		Bilingual film
2016	Jaguar	College Principal	Bilingual films
2017	Rogue	Sanju's father	Bilingual films
2017	Raju Gari Gadhi 2	Priest	
2020	College Kumar	Madhava Rao	
2021	Akhanda	Akhanda's father	
2023	Suvarna Sundari	Raja Ram Bahadur	
2023	Tantiram	Adhiban	
2025	Dear Krishna	Balakrishna	Partially reshot version

=== Other language films ===
Year	Film	Role	Language
1998	Jungle Boy	Sanjay	English
2011	Doubles	Louie	Malayalam
2011	5ters: Castle of Dark Master		Hindi

=== Television ===
Year	Title	Role	Network	Notes
2026	Raakshasa		ZEE5	

== Other activities ==
Avinash is the founder member of Sneha Loka, a club to promote sporting activity among the film fraternity.
