= Ramesh Aravind filmography =

Ramesh Aravind has acted in predominantly Kannada films apart from Tamil, Telugu, Hindi, Malayalam and Tulu films.

== Kannada films ==
- Note: he was credited as Ramesh from 1986 to 2005 and as Ramesh Aravind from 2005 to present.

List of Ramesh Aravind Kannada film credits
Year	Title	Role	Notes	Ref.
1986	Sundara Swapnagalu	Prem		
1986	Mouna Geethe	Vishwa	credited as G. Ramesh	
1986	Maneye Manthralaya	Amar		
1987	Sangrama	Raju		
1987	Elu Suttina Kote	Gopal		
1988	Ganda Mane Makkalu	Chandru		
1989	Madhu Masa	Vikram		
1989	Idu Saadhya	Dr. Prathap		
1990	Kempu Gulaabi	Anand		
1990	Panchama Veda	Ravi		
1991	Varagala Bete	Balaraj (Balu)		
1991	Punda Prachanda	Prakash		
1991	CBI Vijay	Satyanarayan	Special appearance	
1991	C. B. I. Shiva	Bhaskar		
1991	Garuda Dhwaja	Shiva		
1991	Shanti Kranti	Inspector Bharath		
1991	Kiladi Gandu	Rakesh		
1992	Belli Modagalu	Kashi		
1992	Vajrayudha	Mahesh		
1992	Pranayada Pakshigalu	Ramesh		
1993	Abhijith	Ramesh		
1994	Musuku	Hemanth		
1994	Hanthaka	Vijay		
1995	Aragini	Sathya		
1995	Srigandha	Vivek		
1995	Baalondu Chaduranga			
1995	Anuraga Sangama	Ramesh		
1996	Karpoorada Gombe	Ramesha		
1996	Boss	Kiran		
1996	Nammoora Mandara Hoove	Praveen		
1997	America America	Surya	Won—Karnataka State Film Award for Best Actor; Won—Screen Videocon Award for Best Actor	
1997	Rangena Halliyage Rangada Rangegowda	Ramesh		
1997	Amruthavarshini	Abhishek Bharadwaj	Won—Filmfare Award for Best Actor – Kannada; Won—Screen Videocon Award for Best Actor	
1997	O Mallige	Krishnamurthy/Kitty	Won—Udaya Film Award for Best Actor	
1997	Ulta Palta	Devaraj		
1997	Maduve	Ramesh		
1997	Mungarina Minchu	Chethan		
1997	Prema Raga Haadu Gelathi	Kashi		
1998	Anthargami	Ravi		
1998	Megha Banthu Megha	Chandrashekhar		
1998	Thutta Mutta	Harsha		
1998	Avala Charitre	Krishna		
1998	Yaare Neenu Cheluve	Ramesh	Guest appearance	
1998	O Gandasare Neevestu Oleyavaru	Ram		
1998	Hoomale	Santosh	Also story writer	
1998	Hoomale	Santosh	Won—Karnataka State Film Award for Best Actor; Won—Filmfare Award for Best Actor – Kannada; Won—Filmfans Association Award for Best Actor	
1998	Suvvi Suvvalali	Ramesh		
1998	Bhoomi Thayiya Chochchala Maga	Bharath Kumar		
1998	Kanasalu Neene Manasalu Neene	Himself	Special appearance	
1999	Chandrodaya	Sunil Kumar		
1999	Sambhrama	Murali	Won—Filmfans Association Award for Best Actor	
1999	Prathyartha	Akshay/Robert		
1999	Idu Entha Premavayya	Arun		
1999	Chandramuki Pranasakhi	Susheel	Won—Cinema Express Award for Best Actor – Kannada	
1999	Hrudaya Hrudaya	Dr. Suresh		
1999	Aryabhata	Anand		
1999	Arunodaya	Mohan		
1999	Snehaloka	Ramesh		
2000	Shrirasthu Shubhamasthu	Karthik		
2000	Deepavali	Harishchandra		
2000	Nan Hendthi Chennagidale	Himself	Special appearance	
2001	Mahalakshmi	Shyam a.k.a. Karna		
2001	Kurigalu Saar Kurigalu	Rommy		
2001	Hoo Anthiya Uhoo Anthiya	Shivu		
2001	Premi No.1	Muddu Krishna		
2001	Shaapa	Shekar		
2001	Amma Ninna Tholinalli	Kitty		
2001	Kothigalu Saar Kothigalu	Rommy	Won—Filmfare Award for Best Actor – Kannada	
2002	Mutthu	Shivanna		
2002	Ninne Preethisuve	Kalyan		
2002	Olu Saar Bari Olu	Raghu		
2003	Pakka Chukka	Rami a.k.a. Pakka, Rami's father	Dual role	
2003	Katthegalu Saar Katthegalu	Rommy		
2003	Kushalave Kshemave	Murali		
2004	Bisi Bisi	Vijay	Also singer and writer	
2004	Apthamitra	Ramesh		
2004	Joke Falls	Prof. Ananth Patil		
2005	Varsha	Ravi		
2005	Rama Shama Bhama	Rama	Also director	
2005	Rama Shama Bhama	Rama	Won—Udaya Film Award for Best Debut Director; Won—Suvarna Film Award for Best Actor in a Comedy role	
2005	Vishnu Sena	Ramesh		
2006	A Aa E Ee	Shekhar	Guest appearance	
2006	Tenali Rama	Thenali/Thengin Thotad Nagappa Lingappa		
2007	Ekadantha	Vakrathunda/Vakky		
2007	Soundarya	Ramesh		
2007	Sathyavan Savithri	Dr. Sathya	Also director	
2008	Accident	Sawanth	Also director	
2009	Venkata in Sankata	Venkata	Also director	
2009	Mooru Guttu Ondu Sullu Ondu Nija	Appu		
2010	Crazy Kutumba	Shankar Gouda Patil		
2010	Krishna Nee Late Aagi Baaro	Krishna		
2010	Naanu Nanna Kanasu	Jayanth	Guest appearance	
2010	Preethiyinda Ramesh	Ramesh		
2010	Hendtheer Darbar	Shivaramu		
2010	Shock	Ramesh		
2011	Rangappa Hogbitna	Ramesha		
2011	Kalla Malla Sulla	Ramesh		
2012	Nammanna Don	Dr. Arjun	Also director	
2013	Chathrigalu Saar Chathrigalu	Rammi	Also writer	
2013	Mangana Kaiyalli Manikya	Manu		
2014	Mahasharana Haralayya	Basavanna		
2016	...Re	Papanna "Paapu"		
2016	Hey Sarasu	Seetharama Rao		
2017	Pushpaka Vimana	Anatharamiha	100th Kannada film	
2017	Sundaranga Jaana	Himself	Cameo appearance	
2018	Tunturu	Doctor		
2020	Shivaji Surathkal	Shivaji Suratkal	Nominated—Filmfare Award for Best Actor – Kannada	
2021	100	Vishnu	Also director	
2023	Shivaji Surathkal 2	Shivaji Surathkal		
2024	Bhairadevi	DCP Aravind		
2026	Raktha Kashmira	Himself	Special appearance in the song "Star Star"	
2026	KD: The Devil	Dharma Alam		
2026	Yours Sincerely Raam †	TBA	Completed	
2026	Daiji †	TBA	Completed	

== Tamil films ==
List of Ramesh Aravind Tamil film credits
Year	Title	Role	Notes	Ref.
1986	Punnagai Mannan	Malini's lover	Deleted scenes	
1987	Manathil Uruthi Vendum	Ramesh	credited as Aravind	
1988	Unnal Mudiyum Thambi	Charukesi	Uncredited	
1988	Penmani Aval Kanmani	Meenakshi's husband		
1990	Keladi Kanmani	Sashi		
1991	Vasanthakala Paravai	Ravi		
1991	Marikozhundhu	Seenu		
1991	Idhaya Vaasal	Aravind		
1991	Anbulla Thangachikku	Ramesh		
1992	Urimai Oonjaladugirathu	James		
1992	Mouna Mozhi	Chandru		
1993	Puthiya Thendral	Arun		
1993	Maharasan	Ramesh		
1994	Duet	Siva		
1994	Chinna Pulla	Madhan	Guest appearances	
1994	Pathavi Pramanam	Selvamani	Guest appearances	
1995	Sathi Leelavathi	Arunachalam		
1995	Paattu Vaathiyar	Ramesh		
1995	Vetri En Pakkam			
1996	Meendum Savithri	Anandakrishnan		
1996	Avvai Shanmughi	Himself	Guest appearances	
1999	Jodi	Sivabalan	Guest appearances	
2000	Rhythm	Srikanth		
2001	Kutty	Ranganathan		
2002	Panchathantiram	Ganesh Hegde		
2004	Kadhale Engal Desiya Geetham			
2005	Mumbai Xpress	Thambhu		
2010	Manmadhan Ambu	Rajan		
2015	Uttama Villain	Himself	Also director Guest appearance	

== Other language films ==
List of Ramesh Aravind other language film credits
Year	Title	Role	Language	Notes	Ref.
1988	Indradhanassu		Telugu	credited as Aravind	
1988	Rudraveena	Charukesa	Telugu	credited as Ramesh	
1988	O Bharya Katha	Gowtham	Telugu	Uncredited role	
1989	Akhari Kshanam		Telugu		
1991	Parama Sivudu	Raja	Telugu		
1993	Avan Ananthapadmanabhan	Ananthu	Malayalam		
1996	Little Soldiers	Aravind	Telugu		
1996	Neti Savithri	Anandakrishna	Telugu		
1996	Aur Ek Prem Kahani	Satyamoorthy	Hindi		
2003	Golmaal	Amar Sastry	Telugu		
2005	Mumbai Xpress	Thambhu	Hindi		
2013	Nirel	Himself	Tulu	Guest appearance	

== As director and writer ==
=== As film director ===
List of Ramesh Aravind film credits as director
Year	Title	Language	Notes	Ref.				
Year	Title	Language	Notes	Ref.	2005	Rama Shama Bhama	Kannada	Remake of Tamil film, Sathi Leelavathi
2007	Sathyavan Savithri						Kannada	
2008	Accident						Kannada	
2009	Venkata in Sankata						Kannada	
2012	Nammanna Don						Kannada	
2015	Uttama Villain	Tamil						
2016	Sundaranga Jaana	Kannada	Remake of Telugu film, Bhale Bhale Magadivoy					
2021	100	Kannada	Remake of Tamil film, Thiruttu Payale 2					
TBA	Butterfly †	Kannada	Remakes of Hindi film, Queen					
TBA	Paris Paris †	Tamil	Remakes of Hindi film, Queen					

=== As writer ===
List of Ramesh Aravind film credits as writer
Year	Title	Credited as	Language	Notes
Year	Title	Writer	Language	Notes
1998	Hoomale	Yes	Kannada	
2004	Bisi Bisi	Screenplay	Kannada	
2005	Amrithadhare	Story	Kannada	
2013	Chathrigalu Saar Chathrigalu	Yes	Kannada	

== As narrator ==
Year	Title	Language	Notes	Ref.
2010	Cheluveye Ninne Nodalu	Kannada		
2018	Aadi Lakshmi Puraana	Kannada		
2025	Kantara: Chapter 1	Tamil	Dubbed version	

== Television ==
List of Ramesh Aravind television credits
Year	Title	Role	Language	Channel	Notes	Ref.
1995	Kaiyalavu Manasu		Tamil	Sun TV		
1995	Chinna Chinna Aasai		Tamil	Sun TV	Acted in story "Nirangal"	
2004	Diwali Interview with Kamal Haasan	Host	Tamil	Jaya TV		
2009	Preetyinda Ramesh	Host	Kannada	Kasturi TV	52 episodes	
2011	Raja Rani Ramesh	Host	Kannada	ETV Kannada	26 Episodes	
2014–present	Weekend with Ramesh	Host	Kannada	Zee Kannada	104 Episodes	
2018	Kannadada Kotyadhipati	Host	Kannada	Star Suvarna	Season 3	
2019–2020	Nandini Season 2	Narrator	Kannada	Udaya TV		

=== As producer ===
List of Ramesh Aravind television credits as producer
Year	Title	Language	Channel	Ref.
2019–2020	Nandini Season 2	Kannada	Udaya TV	
2021–2023	Sundari	Kannada	Udaya TV	
2023–present	Neenadena	Kannada	Star Suvarna	
2023–present	Aase	Kannada	Star Suvarna	
