= S. Mahendar =

Indian film director

- Born: Bandahalli, Kollegal, Karnataka, India
- Occupations: Film director, actor, producer, screenwriter
- Years active: 1992–present
- Spouse(s): Shruti (divorced); Yashoda (2012 - current)

S. Mahendar is an Indian film director working in Kannada cinema. He is also a politician with the BJP contesting from Kollegal constituency in Karnataka. He debuted into cinema with Pranayada Pakshigalu (1992) and went to direct for over 30 films. He also acted in Gattimela (2001) in the lead role under his own direction. His well-known movies include Thayi Illada Thavaru (1995), Karpoorada Gombe (1996), Snehaloka (1999), Asura (2001), Vaalee (2001), Ninagagi (2002), Gowdru (2004) and Thandege Thakka Maga (2006).

== Personal life ==
Mahendar was married to actress Shruti who had been cast in many of his films. They have a daughter named Gowri. In 2009, Shruti applied for divorce citing understanding differences. He later married a Mysore-based Economics student, Yashoda, in 2012.

== Filmography ==
=== As director ===
Year	Title	Starring	Note
1992	Pranayada Pakshigalu	Ramesh Aravind, Kavya, Anjali Sudhakar	Debut film
1993	Shrungara Kavya	Raghuveer, Sindhu	
1995	Thayi Illada Thavaru	Ramkumar, Shruti	
1996	Hetthavaru	Kalyan Kumar, Lakshmi	
1996	Mouna Raaga	Ambareesh, Srishanthi	
1996	Karpoorada Gombe	Ramesh Aravind, Shruti	
1996	Sthree	Shashikumar, Shruti, Sithara	
1997	Ganga Yamuna	Shiva Rajkumar, Malashri	Remake of Telugu film Subhalagnam
1997	Kodagina Kaveri	Ramkumar, Shruti	
1998	Megha Banthu Megha	Ramesh Aravind, Shilpa	
1998	Suvvi Suvvalali	Ramesh Aravind, Shilpa	Remake of Hindi film Baseraa
1998	Kowrava	B. C. Patil, Prema	Remake of Tamil film Kadalora Kavithaigal
1999	Chandrodaya	Shiva Rajkumar, Ramesh Aravind, Prema	Remake of Tamil film Mouna Ragam
1999	Premachari	B. C. Patil, Shilpa	
1999	Snehaloka	Ramesh Aravind, Anu Prabhakar, Ramkumar	Remake of Tamil film Kannethirey Thondrinal
2001	Gattimela	Himself, Shruti	also actor
2001	Asura	Shiva Rajkumar, Damini	Remake of Tamil film Amarkkalam
2001	Vaalee	Sudeep, Poonam	Remake of Tamil film Vaalee; Nominated - Filmfare Award for Best Director
2002	Ninagagi	Vijay Raghavendra, Radhika	Remake of Malayalam film Niram
2002	Balarama	Rockline Venkatesh, Prema	Remake of Telugu film Yerra Mandaram
2003	Kushalave Kshemave	Ramesh Aravind, Darshan	Remake of Tamil film Kaalamellam Kadhal Vaazhga
2003	Jogula	B. C. Patil, Vijayalakshmi, Ruchita Prasad	
2004	Sakhi	Praveen Kumar, Poonam	
2004	Gowdru	Ambareesh, Shruti, Meena	Remake of Tamil film Kizhakku Cheemayile; Won - Karnataka State Film Award for Third Best Film
2006	Thandege Thakka Maga	Ambareesh, Upendra, Laila Mehdin	Remake of Tamil film Thevar Magan
2007	Preethigaagi	Srimurali, Sridevi Vijayakumar	Remake of Malayalam film Aniyathipravu
2007	Gandana Mane	Shiva Rajkumar, Gowri Munjal	
2008	Akka Thangi	Shruti, Rashmi	
2011	Veerabahu	Duniya Vijay, Nidhi Subbaiah	
2015	Mahakali	Malashri	
2017	Once More Kaurava	Naresh Gowda, Anusha	
2022	Pampa Panchalli Parashivamurthy	Sangeetha Sringeri	

=== As singer ===
Year	Title	Song	Note
2001	Kushalave Kshemave	"Kamakshi Meenakshi"	
