= Mangana Kaiyalli Manikya =

Indian comedy film

- Official poster
- Directed by: Rajendra Karanth
- Written by: Rajendra Karanth
- Produced by: Sandesh Nagaraju
- Starring: Ramesh Aravind; Rangayana Raghu; Ravishankar Gowda; Harshika Poonacha
- Cinematography: J. G. Krishna
- Edited by: S K Nagendra Urs
- Music by: Rajesh Ramanath
- Production company: Sandesh Combines
- Release date: 26 July 2013
- Country: India
- Language: Kannada

Mangana Kaiyalli Manikya (transl. Ruby in monkey's hand) is a 2013 Indian Kannada-language comedy film directed by Rajendra Karanth in his directorial debut and starring Ramesh Aravind, Rangayana Raghu, Ravishankar Gowda and Harshika Poonacha.

== Cast ==
- Ramesh Aravind as Manohar a.k.a. Manu
- Rangayana Raghu as Prabhu
- Ravishankar Gowda as Ranganna
- Harshika Poonacha as Manohar's fiancé
- Sonia Gowda as Roopa
- Saurav Lokesh

== Production ==
Rajendra Karanth, worked on the directorial team of Ramesh Aravind's directorial ventures such as Nammanna Don (2012). The film was initially titled Rasagulla. The film was shot in Bidadi, Bangalore and Mysore.

== Release and reception ==
The film was initially scheduled to release in March of 2013, but it was delayed to July of 2013.

A critic from The Times of India rated the film 3 1/2 out of 5 and wrote that "The neat comedy subject with laughter every moment is for the entire family. The climax could have been better".
