= Jaana (film) =

- Directed by: Shivamani
- Written by: B. Suresh [Dialogues]
- Screenplay by: Shivamani
- Story by: Shivamani
- Produced by: Gayathri Sa Ra Govindu
- Starring: V. Ravichandran; Kasthuri; Shruti
- Cinematography: R. Madhusudhan
- Edited by: Suresh Urs
- Music by: Hamsalekha
- Production company: Amrutheshwari Chithra
- Release date: August 31, 1994
- Running time: 154 minutes
- Country: India
- Language: Kannada

Jaana (Kannada: ಜಾಣ) is a 1994 Indian Kannada language romantic drama film written and directed by Shivamani and produced by Sa. Ra. Govindu. The film stars V. Ravichandran along with Kasthuri and Shruti among others.

== Cast ==
- V. Ravichandran as Ravishankar
- Kasthuri as Kasturi
- Shruti as Lakshmi
- B. C. Patil as police officer
- Anandaraj as Anand (Terrorist)
- Anjana as Beena
- B. V. Radha
- Shivaram as Shivarama Shastri
- Umashri as Mary
- Bank Janardhan as John
- Ashalatha
- Kishori Ballal
- Shankar Ashwath
- Honnavalli Krishna as Auto Manju
- Guru Murthy
- Stunt Devu
- Rocket Vikram
- Raj Kumar

== Soundtrack ==
The music was composed and lyrics were written by Hamsalekha. All the seven tracks composed for the film became popular with "Prema Lokada Parijathave" and "Premane Nanna Prana" being received well.

Track listing
No.	Title	Lyrics	Singer(s)	Length
1.	"Premane Nanna Prana"	Hamsalekha	S. P. Balasubrahmanyam, K. S. Chithra
2.	"One By Two"	Hamsalekha	S. P. Balasubrahmanyam, Lata Hamsalekha
3.	"Premalokada Parijathave"	Hamsalekha	S. P. Balasubrahmanyam
4.	"Dham Dham Endide"	Hamsalekha	S. P. Balasubrahmanyam, Lata Hamsalekha
5.	"Ay Hudugi Yaake"	Hamsalekha	S. P. Balasubrahmanyam, K. S. Chithra
