= Snehaloka =

- Audio cover page
- Directed by: S. Mahendar
- Written by: B. A. Madhu
- Screenplay by: S. Mahender
- Story by: Ravi. C. Chandran
- Based on: Kannedhirey Thondrinal (Tamil)
- Produced by: Jayashri Devi
- Starring: Ramesh Aravind; Anu Prabhakar; Ramkumar; Shashikumar; Vinod Raj
- Cinematography: Krishna Kumar
- Edited by: P. R. Soundar Rajan
- Music by: Hamsalekha
- Production company: Chinni Chitra
- Release date: 24 December 1999
- Running time: 147 minutes
- Country: India
- Language: Kannada

Snehaloka (transl. World of friendship) is a 1999 Indian Kannada-language romantic drama film directed by S. Mahendar and produced by Jayshree Devi. The film has an ensemble cast comprising Ramesh Aravind, Ramkumar, Shashikumar, Vinod Raj and Anu Prabhakar. This film is the Kannada remake of Tamil film Kannedhirey Thondrinal (1998). The film released on 24 December 1999 to generally positive reviews from critics who lauded the lead performances and the catchy musical score by Hamsalekha.

== Plot ==
Ram meets Priya at Bangalore Airport and immediately falls for her. At college, after some ragging, Ramesh and his gang (Abhi, Sharan, Africa) become friends with Ram. Ram does not know that Priya is Ramesh's sister. Priya is unaware that Ram is her brother's friend. Ram pursues Priya and eventually Priya reciprocates his feelings.

Ramesh avoids bringing his friends home for some reason. Ram finds out that Ramesh had a friend called Vinod who had eloped with his other sister Hema on the day of her wedding. This had led to a lot of humiliation for Ramesh and his mother which is the reason why Ramesh's friends are not allowed in their house.

As his story with Priya is parallel to that of Vinod and Hema's, deciding to sacrifice his love, Ram begins avoiding Priya. When it is clear that Ram has chosen his brother's friendship over her love and there is no way of changing that, Priya tries to take her own life.

In the hospital, Ram's friend Shashi reveals the truth to Ramesh. A repentant Ramesh decides to accept Ram and Priya's love. He then finds out that Vinod was the one who got Priya admitted to the hospital and saved her life. He and his mother decide to forgive Vinod and Hema as well.

The film ends with a symbolic snapping that represents their friendship.

== Cast ==
- Ramesh Aravind as Ramesh
- Ramkumar as Ramkumar
- Anu Prabhakar as Priya
- Shashikumar as Shashi (Special appearance)
- Vinod Raj as Vinod
- Vanishree as Hema
- B. V. Radha as Ramesh's mother
- Manju Malini
- Sharan as Sharan
- Abhishek as Abhi
- Michael Madhu as "Africa"
- Shobaraj as police officer
- Lohithaswa as Manohar
- Karibasavaiah as Muthanna "Muthu"
- Shankanada Anjanappa as Sannappa

== Soundtrack ==
Snehaloka

Soundtrack album by Hamsalekha
- Released: 16 August 1999
- Genre: Feature film soundtrack
- Length: 40:27
- Label: Anand Audio

This film music was composed and written by Hamsalekha. A breathless song "Onde Usiranthe" was recorded in the voices of Rajesh Krishnan and K. S. Chitra which was widely appreciated. Sonu Nigam also sang his second number in Kannada whose soundtrack was "inspired" by Celine Dion's "My Heart Will Go On" from the soundtrack of the film Titanic (1997). The album consists of seven tracks.

All tracks are written by Hamsalekha.

No.	Title	Singer(s)	Length
1.	"Titanic Heroine"	Sonu Nigam, Hemanth Kumar	5:40
2.	"Ooty Ooty Beauty"	Suresh Peters, Rajesh Krishnan	6:37
3.	"Onde Usiranthe"	Rajesh Krishnan, K. S. Chithra	6:04
4.	"Loka Snehaloka"	Rajesh Krishnan	5:23
5.	"Yaarige Yaaroo Ilri"	Rajesh Krishnan	5:05
6.	"Thamta Thakita"	Rajesh Krishnan, Ramesh Chandra, Manjula Gururaj, Latha Hamsalekha	5:50
7.	"Don't Worry Thamma"	Suresh Peters, Latha Hamsalekha	5:48
Total length:			40:27

== Reception ==
Srikanth Srinivasa of Deccan Herald called the film a "tear-jerker mould with a light and clean social entertainer." Of the acting performances, he wrote, "Ramesh fits the bill perfectly especially after shedding oodles of adipose. Ramesh has added another dimension to his acting capability. Ramkumar has definitely matured as an actor. Anu Prabhakar is a sweet delight to watch. Sharan seems to have a natural flair for comedy and his dialogues are timed well and so does Michael. Vinod Raj impresses in his brief sojourn. Shashi Kumar looks out of place but has a role to play in the end." Indiainfo wrote "For a change here, the remake is better than the original. Many changes have been made from its original 'Kannedure Tondrinal' to suit the Kannada audience. If you want to see Kaliyuga's Karna who readily sacrifices his love for friendship, watch Snehaloka".
