= Shruti (actress) =

Indian actress and politician (born 1975)

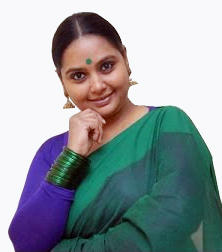
- Shruti in 2016

Chairperson, Karnataka Women's Development Corporation
- In office 2008 – June 2009
- Succeeded by: D. S. Aswath

Chairperson, Karnataka State Tourism Development Corporation
- In office January 2020 – July 2021

Personal details
- Born: Girija; 18 September 1975 (age 50) Bangalore, Karnataka, India
- Party: Bharatiya Janata Party (2008–13, 2014–present)
- Other political affiliations: Karnataka Janata Paksha (2013–14)
- Spouses: S. Mahendar (m. 1998; div. 2009) Chakravarthy Chandrachud (m. 2013; div. 2014)
- Relatives: Sharan (brother)
- Occupation: Actress; politician

Shruti (born Girija; 18 September 1975), is an Indian actress, television personality and politician. She is known for her work predominantly in Kannada language films and in a few Telugu, Tamil, Malayalam, Hindi and Tulu films. She has appeared in more than 160 films, out of which she has been cast in leading role in over 130 films. More than half of the movies are female-oriented, thereby making her one of the very few actresses in Indian cinema to have been successfully cast in more number of heroine oriented movies. She has won three Karnataka State Film Awards, one Tamil Nadu State Film Awards and four Filmfare Awards South in her illustrious career spanning over 35 years.

Shruti was among the leading actresses in Kannada cinema during the 1990s and early 2000s who featured in the lead roles in several commercially successful, female centric and critically acclaimed films such as Shruthi (1990), Muddina Maava (1993), Aagatha (1995), Karpoorada Gombe, Kalki (both 1996), Gowdru (2004), Rama Shama Bhama (2005), Akka Thangi (2008) and Puttakkana Highway (2011). In the later years, she switched to character roles and won laurels for her performances in Kalpana (2012), Gombegala Love (2013), Rathnan Prapancha, Bhajarangi 2 (both 2021), Kaatera (2023) and Maadeva (2025). She is the only actress in Kannada cinema to have been portrayed successfully in all sorts of roles such as the emotional roles, comedy roles and villain.

Shruti is the sister of actor Sharan. In 2016, she won the third season of the reality television show Bigg Boss Kannada. She has continued to appear in Television as a judge for reality shows such as Majaa Talkies and Kwaatle Kitchen.

Shruti joined the Bharatiya Janata Party (BJP) in 2008. She was made the chairperson of the Karnataka Women and Child Development Corporation before being removed in 2009. In 2013, she joined the Karnataka Janata Paksha which eventually merged in 2014 with BJP. She also served as chief secretary of Bharatiya Janata Party's women's wing in its Karnataka cadre. In 2020, she was appointed as the Chairperson of Karnataka State Tourism Development Corporation.

== Early life ==
Shruti was born as Girija on 18 September 1975 into a family of Kannada theatre artists in Bangalore, Karnataka. Her father G. V. Krishna owned a theatre company and married twin sisters Radha and Rukmini who had joined his troupe as artists. Shruti's elder brother Sharan is a leading actor in Kannada cinema, while her sister Usha is younger to her. Since they have two mothers, the subject about who is their biological mother has generated curiosity among the media and public over the years. However, both Sharan and Shruti have asserted that they consider both to be their biological mother. Shruti spent most of her early life in Puttur where she pursued her basic schooling.

== Career ==
=== Films ===
==== 1990-2000: Debut, breakthrough and Stardom ====
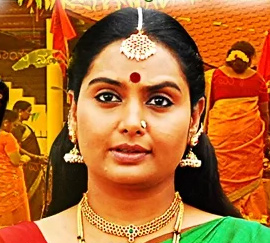
Shruti in 2011 Kannada film Sri Naga Shakthi

At the age of 14, Shruti landed in her first film in a supporting role in S. Umesh's romantic comedy film, Nambidre Nambi Bitre Bidi, released in 1990. She was credited as Priyadarshini by the makers so as not to be confused with another actress Girija Lokesh. Her next role came through another comedy film, Aasegobba Meesegobba released in the same year where she played sister to actor Shiva Rajkumar. However, her breakthrough came in the same year with the film Shruthi, which was directed by Dwarakish who rechristened her name as Shruti. She played the titular role of a struggling singer who is aided by four men to achieve her dreams. The film, which was a remake of Tamil film, Pudhu Vasantham, had a successful theatrical run of over 25 weeks.

Following this, Shruti featured in a series of comedy films out of which Gauri Ganesha, Punda Prachanda (both 1991), Bombat Hendthi, Edurmaneli Ganda Pakkadmaneli Hendthi (both 1992) were successful projects. She expanded into Tamil and Telugu cinema in 1992 with Devar Veettu Ponnu and Pellaniki Premalekha Priyuraliki Subhalekha respectively. She followed this by playing second lead roles in films such as C. B. I. Shiva, Sindhoora Thilaka, Shambhavi, Ksheera Sagara and Dakshayini. She later took up family drama films such as Alimayya, Sri Durga Pooje, Midida Hrudayagalu and Muddina Maava, all released in 1993.

In 1994, she appeared in two films opposite V. Ravichandran, Rasika, directed by Dwarakish, and Jaana. Her other notable performance came through Rashmi in the same year. She went on to win her first Filmfare Award for her performance in the drama film, Hettha Karulu. In 1995, She won her first Karnakata State Film Award and second Filmfare Award for her critically acclaimed role in Aagatha, directed by Suresh Heblikar. During the same period, she shared screen with actor Vishnuvardhan in films such as Time Bomb (1994), Thumbida Mane and Mojugara Sogasugara (both 1995).

In 1996, Shruti worked with K. Balachander for the Tamil film Kalki, where she played the lead titular role alongside Rahman, Prakash Raj and Geetha. Her performance in the film was critically acclaimed, earning her the Filmfare Award for Best Actress – Tamil and the Tamil Nadu State Film Award for Best Actress. In Kannada, she had seven releases out of which Karpoorada Gombe and Thavarina Thottilu made an impact with the audience. She was typecasted in tear-jerker films during this period earning her the "Tragedy queen" status in Kannada cinema. In 1997, she expanded into Malayalam cinema with the Sathyan Anthikkad film Oral Mathram opposite Mammootty and continued with Rajasenan's romantic comedy film Kottaram Veettile Apputtan (1998) opposite Jayaram. Both these films were successful at the box-office and her roles were critically acclaimed.

She attracted a lot of women to theatres in 90s. With more than half of her movies being female oriented, they showcased the struggles of Indian women. She is regarded as "Kannadada manemagalu" for the same reason. She ruled the industry in 90s and earned the superstar status.

==== 2001-2020: Lead and character roles ====
Shruti continued to work with Vishnuvardhan in films such as Veerappa Nayaka (1999) and Soorappa (2000) which were blockbusters. In 2001, she teamed up with her then husband S. Mahendar by starring opposite him in Gattimela. Her performance was well received and earned her a nomination at the Filmfare Awards. After few unsuccessful projects, she appeared in Gowdru (2004) which turned out to be her 100th release in which she played the sister of the character played by Ambareesh. Her performance won laurels and earned her the second Karnataka State Film Award. In 2005, she starred opposite Kamal Hassan in the multi-starrer Rama Shama Bhama, a remake of Tamil hit, Sathi Leelavathi (1995). Her performance was acclaimed; earning nominations at the various film awards including Filmfare. Her last pairing with Vishnuvardhan, before his demise, came through the film Sirivantha in 2006.

Navashakthi Vaibhava, filmed in 2003, had a delayed release in 2008. In 2011, Shruti's biggest critical acclaimed role came through Nagathihalli Chandrashekar's novel based film Puttakkana Highway directed by B. Suresha. She played the lead role of Puttakka, a widowed farmer who fights against the system when her land is threatened by construction. A critic from The Times of India reviewed the film by commenting "Hats off to Shruthi for her brilliant portrayal of Puttakka, a rustic woman. The film won the National Film Award for Best Feature Film in Kannada for the year 2010–2011 and Shruti earned several award nominations for her portrayal of the character.

From 2012, Shruti switched over from lead to character roles in films such as Rambo and the comedy-horror Kalpana. The latter won her several laurels and appreciations including a nomination at Udaya Film Awards and Suvarna Film Awards. In 2013, the films Gombegala Love and Bachchan were noted for her performances. Later she featured in Dandupalya film series in its second and third instalments. She took up lead actor's mother roles in films such as College Kumar (2017), Rathnan Prapancha (2021) and later in Krishnam Pranaya Sakhi (2024).

==== 2021-till date: Continued supporting roles ====
Her character role Alamelamma brought her laurels in the Shiva Rajkumar starrer Bhajarangi 2 in 2021. In 2023, she was noticed again for her character role in Darshan starrer Kaatera which earned her a nomination at Filmfare Award for supporting actress. In Vidhi (Article) 370, set in the backdrop of terror activities in Jammu and Kashmir, her first release of 2023, Shruti played Preethi, the wife of an army officer who needs a heart transplant. In Veeram, she played Saraswathi, the protective sister of the protagonist played by Prajwal Devaraj. The reviewer for Cinema Express wrote: "Shruti's role brings that emotional connection among siblings and all the sentiment is brought through her."

In 2025, she was part of an ensemble cast in the film Maadeva where her performance as Kamalakshi stood out. She was also seen in commercially successful film Ekka and later in Just Married.

=== Television ===
Shruti made her small screen debut in the Malayalam serial Sthreethvam aired on Surya TV during 2005. Also, her Tamil daily serial, Karthigai Pengal aired on Sun TV from July 2012. Shruti was a contestant in the reality television show Bigg Boss Kannada 3, winning the season, in January 2016. In 2017, she appeared as a judge in the comedy television series Majaa Bharatha. In 2025, she appeared as a judge in the comedy cookery show Kwaatle Kitchen aired in Colors Kannada.

== Personal life ==
Shruti was married to film director S. Mahendar for 11 years and they divorced in 2009. Post her divorce she was linked with Chakravarthy Chandrachud, a journalist-turned-director. They got married in June 2013 and divorced a year later.

== Filmography ==
=== Kannada films ===
Year	Title	Role	Notes
1990	Nambidre Nambi Bitre Bidi		Credited as Priyadarshini
1990	Aasegobba Meesegobba	Radha	Credited as Priyadarshini
1990	Shruthi	Shruthi	
1991	Gauri Ganesha	Gauri	
1991	Nagu Nagutha Nali		
1991	Punda Prachanda		
1991	C. B. I. Shiva	Shruthi	
1992	Sindhoora Thilaka		
1992	Bombat Hendthi		
1992	Chitralekha		
1992	Edurmaneli Ganda Pakkadmaneli Hendthi	Jayakumari	
1992	Shambhavi		
1992	Ksheera Sagara	Chandra	
1993	Abhijith		
1993	Kaadambari		
1993	Alimayya	Lakshmi	
1993	Dakshayini		
1993	Sri Durga Pooje		
1993	Mouna Sangrama		
1993	Ranjitha		
1993	Kempaiah IPS		
1993	Rupaayi Raja		
1993	Midida Hrudayagalu	Kaveri	
1993	Muddina Maava	Lakshmi	
1993	Amruta Sindhu		
1994	Apoorva Samsara	Raji	
1994	Rashmi	Rashmi	
1994	Rasika	Rukmini	
1994	Jaana	Lakshmi	
1994	Vijaya Kankana	Vijaya	
1994	Sammilana		
1994	Bhuvaneshwari		
1994	Mr. Mahesh Kumar	Soumya	
1994	Hettha Karulu		Filmfare Award for Best Actress – Kannada
1994	Time Bomb	Maala	
1995	Thumbida Mane	Kaveri	
1995	Maangalya Sakshi		
1995	Kalyanotsava		
1995	Mojugara Sogasugara	Shantha	
1995	Shubha Lagna		
1995	Urvashi		
1995	Satya Jwale		
1995	Taayi Illada Tavaru		
1995	Aagatha	Usha	Karnataka State Film Award for Best Actress; Filmfare Award for Best Actress – Kannada
1996	Karpoorada Gombe	Seetha	
1996	Thavarina Thottilu		
1996	Geluvina Saradara		
1996	Sthree	Heera	
1996	Sowbhagya Devathe		
1996	Minugu Thare		
1996	Thayi Kotta Seere		
1997	Taaliya Sowbhagya		
1997	Shruthi Hakida Hejje		
1997	Baalina Daari		
1997	Kodagina Kaveri	Kaveri	
1997	Thavarina Theru		
1998	Bhama Satyabhama	Bhama	
1998	Marthanda		
1998	Nammura Huduga		
1998	Goonda Mattu Police		
1998	Jagadeeshwari		
1998	Tavarina Kanike		
1999	Veerappa Nayaka		
1999	Durga Shakthi		
2000	Soorappa	Lakshmi	
2000	Kadlimatti Station Master	Kashibai	
2000	Mahathma		
2000	Swalpa Adjust Madkolli		
2001	Amma Ninna Tholinalli		
2001	Gattimela	Girija	Nominated—Filmfare Award for Best Actress – Kannada
2001	Jenu Goodu		
2001	Mahalakshmi	Mahalakshmi	
2001	Ellara Mane Dosenu	Vasantha	
2002	Annayya Thammayya		
2002	Mutthu	Gowri	
2002	Manase O Manase		
2004	Hendthi Andre Hendthi		
2004	Gowdru	Gowri	Karnataka State Film Award for Best Actress; Nominated—Filmfare Award for Best Actress – Kannada
2005	Rama Shama Bhama	Shanti	Vatika Chalana Chitra Award for Best Comedian; Nominated—Udaya film Award for Best Comedian; Nominated—Udaya Film Award Best Supporting Actress; Nominated—Filmfare Award for Best Supporting Actress – Kannada
2005	Pandu Ranga Vittala		
2006	Sirivantha	Lakshmi	
2006	Hendathi Kattida Thali		Delayed release
2008	Navashakti Vaibhava	Saubhagya	
2008	Avva	Aane Baddi Rangavva	
2008	Nandadeepa		
2008	Akka Thangi	Nagi	
2011	Sri Naga Shakthi		
2011	Puttakkana Highway	Puttakka	Filmfare Award for Best Supporting Actress – Kannada; Nominated—TV9 Film Award for Best Supporting Actress - Kannada; Nominated—Innovative Award for Best Supporting Actress - Kannada; Nominated—Sandalwood Star Award for Best Supporting Actress; Nominated—Udaya Film Awards for Best Supporting Actress; Nominated—Suvarna Film Awards for Best Supporting Actress
2011	Aidondla Aidu		
2012	Sri Kshetra Adichunchanagiri		
2012	Rambo	Vijayalakshmi	
2012	Kalpana	Janaki	Nominated—Sandalwood Star Award for Best Comedian; Nominated—Udaya Film Award for Best Comedian; Nominated—Suvarna Film Award for Best Comedian; Nominated—Udaya Film Award for Best Supporting Actress; Nominated—Suvarna Film Award for Best Supporting Actress
2013	Gombegala Love	Panju's mother	Karnataka Vanijya Mandali Award for Best Supporting Actress
2013	Bachchan	Lakshmi	
2015	Ond Chance Kodi	Tavare	
2016	Shivayogi Sri Puttayyajja		
2016	1944	Girija	
2016	Home Stay		
2017	Marali Manege		
2017	Dandupalya 2	Abhivyakthi	
2017	College Kumar	Girija	
2018	Dandupalya 3	Abhivyakthi	
2020	ACT 1978	Kanika Mehta	
2021	Mohandas	Putlibai	
2021	Rathnan Prapancha	Yellavva	
2021	Bhajarangi 2	Alamelamma	
2023	Vidhi (Article) 370	Preethi	
2023	Veeram	Saraswathi	
2023	Tatsama Tadbhava	Suman	
2023	13 Part-1	Saira	
2023	Kaatera	Kumari	Nominated—Filmfare Award for Best Supporting Actress – Kannada; Chittara Star Awards for Best Supporting Actress; IIFA Utsavam Award for Best Supporting Actress (Kannada)
2024	Krishnam Pranaya Sakhi	Krishna's mother	
2025	Maadeva	Kamalakshi	
2025	Ekka	Ratna	
2025	Just Married	Gangamma	
2025	Flirt		
2026	Surya: The Power of Love	Mamatha	
2026	Majestic 2		

=== Other language films ===
Year	Title	Role	Language	Notes
1992	Thevar Veettu Ponnu	Saroja	Tamil	
1992	Pellaniki Premalekha Priyuraliki Subhalekha	Keerthi	Telugu	
1994	September 8		Tulu	
1994	Parugo Parugu	Saroja	Telugu	
1996	Kalki	Kalki	Tamil	Tamil Nadu State Film Award for Best Actress; Filmfare Award for Best Actress – Tamil
1997	Oral Mathram	Devika Menon	Malayalam	
1998	Kottaram Veettile Apputtan	Ambili	Malayalam	
1998	Bobbili Vamsham		Telugu	
1999	Annan Thangachi	Sarasu	Tamil	
2004	C. I. Mahadevan 5 Adi 4 Inchu	Dr. Lakshmi	Malayalam	

== Television ==
- All shows are in Kannada, unless otherwise noted.

Year	Title	Role	Notes	Ref.
2005	Sthreetvam		Malayalam series	
2012–2013	Karthigai Pengal	Charu	Tamil series	
2015	Super Minute	Contestant		
2015–2016	Bigg Boss Kannada (season 3)	Contestant	Winner	
2017	Majaa Bharatha	Judge		
2017	Weekend with Ramesh	Herself		
2017	Sathya Kathe	Herself		
2020	Majaa Talkies	Guest		
	Mareyalare			
	Hejje Guruthu			
2022–2023	Gicchi GiliGili	Judge		
2023	Bigg Boss Kannada (season 10)	Guest		
2025	Kwaatle Kitchen	Judge		

Preceded by Akul Balaji (2014)	Bigg Boss Kannada Winner (Series 3) 2015	Succeeded by Pratham (2016)
