= Mahasharana Haralayya =

2014 film

- Directed by: B A Purushottham
- Produced by: A Devaraj
- Starring: Ramesh Aravind; Sridhar
- Cinematography: Gouri Venkatesh
- Edited by: C H Kumar
- Music by: Jimmy Raj
- Release date: 10 January 2014
- Country: India
- Language: Kannada

Mahasharana Haralayya is a 2014 Indian Kannada-language film directed by B A Purushottham starring Ramesh Aravind and Sridhar. and K V Ravichandra in lead roles. The film released on 10 January 2014 The film is based on the 12th century philosophers Basavanna and Haralayya.

== Cast ==
- Ramesh Aravind as Basavanna
- Sridhar as Haralayya
- K V Ravichandra
- Ramakrishna as Bijjala
- Ramesh Bhat as Manchanna
- Rajvardhan as Sheelavantha
- Rajendra (Dingri)
- Vikram Udaykumar
- Jayalakshmi
- Sheela
- Sumithra

== Production ==
This is Ramesh Aravind's first mythological film.

=== Filming ===
Principal photography began on 1 July 2013. The team successfully completed the first schedule at Chitradurga Fort on 26 July 2013. The film was successfully wrapped on 24 August 2013. It was shot extensively in North Karnataka, such as Basavakalyan, Gadag, Dharwad, Kundagol and Basavana Bagewadi.

== Music ==
Mahasharana Haralayya

Soundtrack album by Jimmy Raj
- Released: 2013
- Recorded: 2013
- Genre: Feature film soundtrack
- Length: 37:22
- Language: Kannada

Official audio
- Mahasharana Haralayya - Full Album on YouTube

The soundtrack of the album was released on 13 December 2013. Mahasharana Haralayya consists of 11 songs composed by Jimmy Raj, Basavanna and BA Purushottam are the lyricists who have penned the lyrics for the songs.

Track listing
No.	Title	Singer(s)	Length
1.	"Bandhanu Basavanu"	Badari Prasad	4:25
2.	"Badukinalli Sudina"	Ajay Warier and Nanditha	5:31
3.	"Andu Indu Vachana"	Badari Prasad	2:32
4.	"Kollenayya Pranigala Vachana"	Ajay Warier	3:05
5.	"Avanaadarenu Vachana"	Ajay Warier	0:54
6.	"Kayothande Ninu"	Nanditha, Ajay Warier	5:26
7.	"Koluvavane Vachana"	Badari Prasad	1:02
8.	"Nelavonde Vachana"	Badari Prasad	3:20
9.	"Shivana Sanidya"	Nanditha, Ajay Warier	5:12
10.	"Shivanoba Balla"	Hemant Kumar	5:15
11.	"Vedhakke Horeya Vachana"	Ajay Warier	2:00
Total length:			37:22

== Reception ==
=== Critical response ===
A Sharadhaa from The New Indian Express wrote "Though a predictable story, the director satisfactorily brings majesty to every frame in the film. Ramesh Aravind as Basavanna does well. Sridhar fulfills the asking of his character. Being a period film, there are one too many songs, all composed by Jimmy Raj. The Verdict: Despite some plodding on, the film showers respect for its subject. Can be watched to brush up your history". A critic from The Times of India scored the film at 3.5 out of 5 stars and says "Full marks to Ramesh Aravind, Sridhar, Ramesh Bhat and Ramakrishan for their brilliant performance. Music by Jimmi Raj is good and cinematography by Gauri Venkatesh is superb". A critic from Sify wrote "While the camera work by Gouri Venkatesh compliments the movie, Jimmy Raj?s music needs some improvement. Supporting star cast Ramesh Bhat, Ramakrishna, Dingri Raju, Jayalakshmi, Sheela and Sumithra have all put in their best efforts. Ismail?s art direction is visible clearly onscreen and applaud able too".
