= Kushalave Kshemave =

- DVD cover
- Directed by: S. Mahendar
- Screenplay by: S. Mahendar
- Story by: R. Balu
- Based on: Kaalamellam Kadhal Vaazhga (1997)
- Produced by: Dr. Sathyamurthy Kotam Raju
- Starring: Ramesh Aravind; Shri Lakshmi
- Cinematography: D. Srinivasa Rao
- Edited by: P. R. Sounder Rajan
- Music by: Rajesh Ramanath
- Production company: Sri Rajarajeshwari Creations
- Release date: 2 May 2003
- Country: India
- Language: Kannada

Kushalave Kshemave (transl. Have you been doing well?) is a 2003 Indian Kannada-language romantic drama film directed by S. Mahendar and starring Ramesh Aravind and Shri Lakshmi. The film is a remake of the Tamil film Kaalamellam Kadhal Vaazhga (1997). Unlike the original, this film was a box office failure.

The film's story is about Murali, a struggling singer, who starts falling in love with Priya after talking with her over the telephone. While he finds various ways to meet her in real life, her marriage is fixed with another man. The film's title is inspired by a song of the same name from Yaare Neenu Cheluve (1998).

== Plot ==
Murali is a college boy and an unemployed singer (with bundles of commitments as he belongs to the lower middle class), who enchants the rich college girl Priya with his musical skills through the telephone. Priya, the music buff who is in the habit of appreciating good singers over the phone, does it with Murali and also sends him greeting cards. The telephonic voice of Priya and her cards turn out to have a tremendous magical romantic effect on the hero (to the point of starvation), who besides falling in one-sided love with her, wants to see her in real life too. Unbeknownst to Murali, Priya is to marry a man named Darshan.

== Cast ==
- Ramesh Aravind as Murali
- Shri Lakshmi as Priya
- Dattatreya
- Mukhyamantri Chandru
- Sharan
- Michael Madhu
- Shyam Navale
- Darshan as Darshan
- Shivaram
- Avinash
- B. V. Radha
- Renukamma Murgod
- Kishori Ballal
- Ashok Rao
- Bharath Bhagavathar
- Ramkumar in a guest appearance

== Production ==
The film's title is based on a song from Yaare Neenu Cheluve (1998). The story was reported to be similar to Beladingala Baale (1995).

== Soundtrack ==
The music was composed by Rajesh Ramanath, and the songs were released under the Anand Audio label. The lyrics were written by K. Kalyan. Except for "Aa Devara Sundara", all songs were reused from the original.

Track listing
No.	Title	Singer(s)	Length
1.	"Telephone Gelathi"	Rajesh Krishnan	5:29
2.	"Aa Devara Sundara"	Rajesh Krishnan	3:59
3.	"Babilona"	Rajesh Krishnan	5:27
4.	"Kamakshi Meenakshi"	S. Mahendar	4:05
5.	"Nannolave"	Rajesh Krishnan, K. S. Chithra	5:33
6.	"Bhagavantha"	Rajesh Krishnan	4:29
Total length:			29:02

== Reception ==
A critic from Vijaya Karnataka wrote that "the foundation here is shaky. It is a superhuman idea for the hero to die without seeing the heroine even once" added that the film was saved by Ramesh's performance, the comedy by Sharan and Micheal Madhu and the song "Telephone Gelathi". A critic from indiainfo.com wrote that "Its happy time for Ramesh. For sometime we had lost our Ramesh in the Kathe, Kothi, Kuri fiasco. But Kushalave Kshemave is something different. It reminds us a lot of our old Ramesh. The role of an innocent loverboy suits Ramesh very much".
