= Chandrodaya =

- Poster
- Directed by: S. Mahendar
- Based on: Mouna Ragam by Mani Ratnam
- Starring: Ramesh Aravind; Prema
- Cinematography: Krishna Kumar
- Edited by: P. R. Soundar Raj
- Music by: Hamsalekha
- Production company: Sandesh Enterprises
- Release date: 5 February 1999
- Running time: 140 minutes
- Country: India
- Language: Kannada

Chandrodaya (transl. Moonrise) is a 1999 Indian Kannada-language romance drama film directed by S. Mahendar, and is a remake of the 1986 Tamil film Mouna Ragam. The film stars Ramesh Aravind and Prema in lead roles, with Shiva Rajkumar making a guest appearance. Shivaram, Sathyapriya, Bharath Bhagavathar, Tara and Doddanna feature in supporting roles. It narrates the life of Divya (Prema), a young woman who reluctantly agrees to an arranged marriage with Sunil Kumar (Ramesh Aravind) despite being unable to overcome the memories of her deceased lover Shivu (Shiva Rajkumar). The film explores her emotional struggle between clinging to her past and adjusting to her new married life.

The film was produced under the banner Sandesh Enterprises. Hamsalekha scored music for the film and Krishna Kumar served as the cinematographer. Upon theatrical release on 5 February 1999, it was met with generally positive reviews.

== Plot ==
Divya, an M.Sc. Zoology student living in Mysore with her parents, two sisters Geetha and Ramya, brother and sister-in-law, faces constant pressure from her family to get married as her father nears retirement from government service. Although Divya believes she is too young for marriage and wishes to continue her studies, her father's deteriorating health and a subsequent heart attack compel her to reluctantly agree for the sake of her family.

Meanwhile, Sunil Kumar, a personnel manager working for a firm in New Delhi, visits Divya's house with his family as part of an arranged marriage proposal. While both families approve of the alliance, Divya openly tells Sunil that she has no interest in marrying him. Despite this, Sunil develops an affection for her and agrees to the marriage. Following their wedding, Divya moves to New Delhi with him, but remains emotionally distant and resentful. She rejects his attempts at affection, refuses his gifts and expresses discomfort whenever he tries to get close to her.

When Sunil questions her behaviour, Divya reveals her past. During her college days, she had fallen in love with Shivu, a principled man who had become involved in criminal activities due to circumstances beyond his control. Although Shivu wished to reform and marry her through a registered marriage, he is falsely arrested in connection with a crime and is accidentally shot dead by the police while attempting to escape custody. Still traumatized by the incident, and when offered by Sunil to choose between a gift he has bought for her and signing the divorce papers, she choses the latter. The couple consult a lawyer to file the papers before the court and finalize their divorce. However, she tells them that the law requires that they remain together for a year before the court grants the divorce.

As they continue living together, Divya gradually begins to understand Sunil's kindness and integrity. Their relationship slowly improves, particularly after she cares for him when he is assaulted by an office attendant whom he had dismissed from work, and other members of his union. Despite recognizing her growing affection, Sunil distances himself emotionally, believing he must prepare himself for life after their separation. Hurt by his words, Divya decides to leave for Mysore, but before departing she confesses her love for him and tears up the divorce papers. Sunil eventually admits that he too loves her, and Divya chooses to stay with him.

== Cast ==
- Ramesh Aravind as Sunil Kumar
- Prema as Divya
- Shiva Rajkumar in a guest appearance as Shivu
- Shivaram as Krishnaswamy, Divya's father
- Sathyapriya as Divya's mother
- Bharath Bhagavathar as Prasad, Divya's brother
- Tara as Divya's sister-in-law
- Doddanna as Sunil Kumar's boss
- Vinaya Prasad in a guest appearance as a lawyer
- Avinash as police officer
- Rangayana Raghu as employee fired by Sunil Kumar (uncredited)

== Production ==
Filming took place in Mysore and New Delhi. Four song sequences for the film were shot in Mysore and its vicinity in December 1998.

== Soundtrack ==
Hamsalekha scored music for the film including its soundtracks in addition to writing its lyrics. The soundtrack album constitutes six tracks.

Track listing
No.	Title	Singer(s)	Length
1.	"Baro Geleya"	K. S. Chithra	4:59
2.	"Bul Bhulla"	Ramesh Chandra, K. S. Chithra	5:11
3.	"Hoovige Thangali"	S. P. Balasubrahmanyam, K. S. Chithra	4:51
4.	"Inchara Inchara"	K. S. Chithra	4:54
5.	"Oho Chandrama"	S. P. Balasubrahmanyam	5:12
6.	"Raja Raja"	Shiva Rajkumar	4:51
Total length:			29:58

== Reception ==
Srikanth Srinivasa, reviewing the film for Deccan Herald, called the film "fairly decent" and wrote, "The film could have been easily trimmed in the dull first half. Music is mediocre by Hamsalekha's standards, except for the song Baaro baaro geleya... Director S Mahendar has faltered in the fight sequences of the film." He further wrote, "Ramesh is controlled and wooden as his character demands. Prema is pleasing and endearing as ever. Prema has put up a spirited performance. However, Ramesh looks jaded in the fight sequences that have been done badly. Shiva Rajkumar is wasted and so is Doddanna." S. Shiva Kumar wrote in The Times of India, "Director Mahender is catching up on the Tamil classics of the '80s. So, after a rehash of Bharathi Rajaa's Kadalora Kavidhaigal, it's Mani's Mouna Raagam. Mahender takes his job seriously and even the simplest of shots have the same camera angle. The most impressive aspect is that he doesn't tamper with the original and tries to use his imagination. If you haven't seen the original, this is not bad at all and is several notches above what's being served today It would have been much better if Mahender had used the original background score by Ilayaraja which was superb". Y Maheswara Reddy of The New Indian Express wrote, "Director Mahendar has taken every care to make it watchable by bringing out all the talent of the artists in this film".
