= Aaghaatha =

Aaghaata
- Directed by: Suresh Heblikar
- Written by: Suresh Heblikar
- Based on: novel by Dr. Ashok Pai
- Produced by: Manasa Arts
- Starring: Suresh Heblikar; Shruti
- Cinematography: S. R. Bhat
- Edited by: M. N. Swamy
- Music by: Vijaya Bhaskar
- Production company: Manasa Arts
- Release date: 1994
- Running time: 127 min
- Country: India
- Language: Kannada

Aaghaata is a 1994 Indian Kannada language thriller - drama film directed by Suresh Heblikar and based on a novel by Dr. Ashok Pai. It was produced by Manasa Arts banner. Besides Heblikar, the film features Girish Karnad, Shruti and Srikanth in pivotal roles. The music was composed by Vijaya Bhaskar.

The film won actress Shruti her first Karnataka State Best Actress award for her performance.

== Plot ==
Kannada psychodrama based on the true-life case studies of the Pai couple, practicing psychiatrists and the film's producers. Usha (Shruthi), daughter of a retired school teacher, turns down a marriage proposal from a progressive US-based engineer in favour of university colleague Vikas (Srikant). Vikas abandons Usha when his oppressive father demands a dowry she cannot pay. After psychiatric treatment, Usha joins a rural voluntary organisation where she falls for its leader, Francis (Suresh Heblikar). The demise of her second lover after local gossip takes on religious overtones causes a further psychological crisis. The psychiatrist in the film (Girish Karnad), representing the producers, offers a sociological critique of the events.

== Cast ==
- Suresh Heblikar
- Girish Karnad
- Shruti
- Srikanth
- Ramakrishna
- G. V. Shivanand
- Radha Ramachandra
- Mallikarjuna

== Soundtrack ==
All the songs are composed and scored by Vijaya Bhaskar.

Sl No	Song title	Singer(s)	Lyricist
1	"Banthido Shringara Maasa"	Kusuma	D R Bendre
2	"Eko Kaane Arali Banthu"	Rajesh Krishnan	Chi. Udaya Shankar
