= Gowdru =

- VCD cover
- Directed by: S. Mahendar
- Written by: B. A. Madhu; M. S. Abhishek; S. Mahendar
- Based on: Kizhakku Cheemayile
- Produced by: Sandesh Nagaraj
- Starring: Ambareesh; Meena; Devaraj; Shruti; B. Jaya
- Cinematography: Sundarnath Suvarna
- Edited by: P. R. Soundarraj
- Music by: Hamsalekha
- Production company: Sandesh Combines
- Release date: 16 July 2004
- Running time: 149 minutes
- Country: India
- Language: Kannada

Gowdru is a 2004 Kannada drama film directed by S. Mahendar. The film features Ambareesh, Meena, Devaraj and Shruti in the lead roles. B. Jaya and Ramesh Pandit feature in supporting roles. The film marks the 200th of Ambareesh and the 100th of Shruti. The film featured original score and soundtrack composed and written by Hamsalekha. Sandesh Nagaraj claimed this film was inspired from novel Kerege Hara. The film is an unofficial remake of Tamil film Kizhakku Cheemayile (1993).

== Cast ==
- Ambareesh as Rame Gowda
- Meena as Parvati
- Devaraj as Rudrappa Gowda
- Shruti as Gowri
- Chytra Hallikeri as Kaveri (credited as Chaitra)
- Vishal Hegde as Shivu
- Srinagar Kitty as Nanjunda
- Karibasavaiah as Kariya
- Ramesh Pandit as Naga, Rudrappa Gowda's brother-in-law
- Renuka Prasad as villager
- Shivaji Rao Jadhav as villager
- Nagaraj Kote as villager
- B. Jaya as Rudrappa Gowda's mother
- Shailaja Somashekhar
- Arpitha as young Kaveri (credited as Baby Arpitha)

== Soundtrack ==
Hamsalekha composed the film's background score and music for its soundtrack.

Track listing
No.	Title	Lyrics	Singer(s)	Length
1.	"Gaaliyalli Bhoomiya"	Hamsalekha	Chetan Sosca	6:32
2.	"Thaali Kanda Naari"	Hamsalekha	Fayaz, Chetan Sosca, M. Sheela, Lata Hamsalekha	6:52
3.	"En Gowdre"	Hamsalekha	Rajesh Krishnan, Hemanth Kumar, Nanditha	6:08
4.	"Helu Hamsa Pakshi"	Hamsalekha	Rajesh Krishnan, Archana Udupa	4:49
5.	"Gandhada Pada"	Hamsalekha	Rajesh Krishnan, Archana Udupa, Nanditha, Jayamma	5:32
6.	"Male Banda Marughalige"	Hamsalekha	Rajesh Krishnan, Divya Raghavan	5:14
Total length:				35:07

== Reception ==
S. N. Deepak of Deccan Herald in his review of the film wrote, "The story, though not new, has its loads of sentimental scenes. The comic interludes are good." While commending the music and lyrics of the film's soundtrack, cinematography, dialogue and costumes on the film, he noted that "[a]t some points, scenes lack continuity..." Sify wrote "It is an out and out Ambareesh show and he is outstanding in his 200th film. He carries the film entirely on his shoulders and Sruthi as his sister is also convincing (it is her 100th film). Hamsalekha’s music has certain earthiness about it. On the whole Gowdru is a decent family tear-jerker that will do well in the interior regions".

== Accolades ==
Karnataka State Film Awards

- Third Best Film
- Best Actress — Shruti
- Best Supporting Actress — B. Jaya
