= Time Bomb (1994 film) =

- VCD cover
- Directed by: Joe Simon
- Written by: N. Utthamchand Jain
- Produced by: N. Utthamchand Jain
- Starring: Vishnuvardhan; Devaraj; Tiger Prabhakar; Shruthi
- Cinematography: Johny Lal
- Edited by: Suresh Urs
- Music by: Hamsalekha
- Release date: 4 February 1994
- Running time: 146 minutes
- Country: India
- Language: Kannada

Time Bomb is a 1994 Indian Kannada-language action thriller film directed by Joe Simon and written and produced by N. Utthamchand Jain. The film starred Vishnuvardhan, Tiger Prabhakar Devaraj, Shruthi and Sowmya Kulkarni in the leading roles. The film's music is scored by Hamsalekha whilst the cinematography is by Johny Lal.

== Cast ==
- Vishnuvardhan as DCP Vishwanath
- Tiger Prabhakar as Police Commissioner Durai
- Devaraj as Prathap
- Sowmya Kulkarni as Madhavi
- Shruthi as Mala
- Puneet Issar as Jinga
- Dheerendra Gopal as Minister Madan Kumar
- Sundar Raj
- Joe Simon
- Sathyajith as MLA Rudrappa
- Rockline Venkatesh as Gajendra
- Sihi Kahi Chandru
- M. S. Umesh as Subba Shastri
- Lohithaswa
- Pandari Bai as Mangalamma
- Ashalatha
- Shobha Raghavendra
- K. V. Manjaiah

== Soundtrack ==
The music of the film was composed and lyrics written by Hamsalekha. After release, the soundtrack was well received. Audio was released on Manoranjan Music label.

Track listing
No.	Title	Lyrics	Length
1.	"Ee Bombat Bombe"	Hamsalekha
2.	"Mutthina Butti Kattikondu"	Hamsalekha
3.	"Alli Bombu Illi Bombu"	Hamsalekha
4.	"Guyya Guyya"	Hamsalekha
5.	"Jhumma Jhumma"	Hamsalekha
