= Karpoorada Gombe =

- VCD cover
- Directed by: S. Mahendar
- Written by: S. Mahendar
- Produced by: M. Chandrashekar
- Starring: Ramesh Aravind; Shruti; Lokesh; Shwetha
- Cinematography: Krishna Kumar
- Edited by: P. R. Soundar Raj
- Music by: Hamsalekha
- Production company: Sri Nimishamba Productions
- Release date: 5 June 1996
- Running time: 150 min
- Country: India
- Language: Kannada

Karpoorada Gombe is a 1996 Indian Kannada language romantic drama film directed and written by S. Mahendar. The film stars Ramesh Aravind, Shruti and Shwetha in the lead roles and featured music composed by Hamsalekha. Actor Sharan made his debut with this film. The film was dubbed and released in Tamil as Akka by R. B. Choudary with added comedy track of Vadivelu and Chinni Jayanth. The film was remade in Telugu as Seetakka with Vinod Kumar and Aamani.

== Cast ==
- Ramesh Aravind as Ramesh
- Shruti as Seetha
- Shwetha as Yashoda
- Sharan
- Lokesh
- Srinivasa Murthy
- Doddanna as Puttaranga
- Rekha Das as Puttaranga's wife
- Ashalatha
- Vanishree
- Master Anand
- Keerthana H. S.
- Vaijanath Biradar

== Soundtrack ==
All the songs are composed, scored and lyrics written by Hamsalekha.

Sl No	Song title	Singer(s)
1	"O Malligeye"	K. S. Chithra
2	"Thabbalige Ee Thabbaliya"	K. S. Chithra
3	"Bandhu O premada Sindhu"	K. S. Chithra
4	"Karpoorada Gombe"	Mano, K. S. Chithra
5	"O Malebille"	Mano, K. S. Chithra

== Reception ==
K. N. Vijiyan of New Straits Times wrote that "S. Mahendar's treatment of the story is very much like what you would find in movies of yeateryear - straight-forward storytelling with no new tricks".
