= Haralayya =

12th century scheduled cast poet-saint

Sharana Haralayya
- Born: Basavakalyan, Karnataka
- Died: Basavakalyan, Karnataka
- Works: Chambhar, Cobbler, poet & propagator of Sharana movement

Ecclesiastical career
- Religion: Lingayat

Sant Haralayya or Guru Haralayya was a 12th-century great saint and poet of Vachana sahitya in India. He joined Anubhava Mantapa, the hall created by Basava, where every caste was welcome.

== History ==
Haralayya was born in Chamar Community Kalyan of Karnataka. He was a cobbler and an ardent follower of Basava, who founded Lingayatism. He married Kalyanamma, who was also a follower of Basava.

Once he met Basava on the streets and greeted him, eliciting a polite reply Basava. Haralayya was dumb struck that he was greeted so courteously by the king's treasurer. Later he regretted that he did not answer Basava's greeting and failed to show humility. So he and Kalyanamma decided to offer footwear made from their own skin to Basava. But Basava refused to accept the gift, because he did not regard himself worthy.

On his way back home, Haralayya met Madhavarasa, a Brahmin minister of Kalchuris, who tried to snatch the shoes and take them with him, but because of this misdeed, he contracted leprosy. His maid took him to Haralayya to cure him, and after bathing in water from Haralayya's tank, he healed. Madhavarasa apologized to him and took 'Istalingadiksha' and became a follower of Lingayatism.

Basava arranged the marriage of Madhavarasa's daughter, Lavanya, to Haralayya's son, Sheelavantha, which resulted in strong opposition by Bijjala II, the ruler of Southern Kalachuris. Offended by the decision, he killed both Madhavara and Haralayya's family.

== In popular culture ==
In 2014, Kannada film director Purushottam directed the movie Mahasharana Haralayya, chronicling the story of Haralayya's life.

Haralayya Tirth was built at the entrance of Basavakalyan by Basava Dharma Peetha Charitable Trust.
