= Veerappa Nayaka =

- Directed by: S. Narayan
- Written by: B. L. Venu (dialogues)
- Screenplay by: S. Narayan
- Story by: S. Narayan
- Produced by: Vidyavathi Narayan
- Starring: Vishnuvardhan; Shruti; Hema Choudhary
- Cinematography: R. Giri
- Edited by: P. R. Soundar Raj
- Music by: Rajesh Ramanath
- Production company: Vidyadhare Pictures
- Release date: 1 January 1999
- Running time: 157 minutes
- Country: India
- Language: Kannada

Veerappa Nayaka is a 1999 Indian Kannada-language biographical film, directed by S. Narayan, starring Vishnuvardhan and Shruti. It is a story of a Gandhian's son turning into a terrorist. This was also the first film in Vishnuvardhan and Narayan's combination and the movie ran for 50 weeks at the box office. This film is quite important in studying the history of the production of the Indian flag through the ages. The film uses the location of garag village, which was the place where the flag was made by a weaving village before it was certified by the Bureau of Indian Standards.

== Plot ==
An innocent man's son becomes a terrorist.

== Cast ==
- Vishnuvardhan as Veerappa Nayaka
- Shruthi as Hema, Veerappa's wife and Subash's mother
- Hema Choudhary as Veerappa Nayaka's Mother
- Saurav
- Shobaraj
- Kote Prabhakar
- Renuka prasad
- Bhavani Shankar
- Agro Chikkanna
- Bhavyashree Rai
- Ashalatha
- Renukamma Murugod
- Bank Suresh
- Fayaz Khan
- Sudheer
- Renuka Prasad

== Soundtrack ==
Music for the film was composed by Rajesh Ramanath.

S. No.	Song	Singers
1	"Ee Mannina Hemmeya Maganivanu"	S. P. Balasubrahmanyam
2	"Malle Ninna Maathu Kelada"	S. P. Balasubrahmanyam, K. S. Chitra
3	"O Ambarave Ninnede"	S. P. Balasubrahmanyam
4	"Aa Dushtara Shikshiso" (Bit)	S. P. Balasubrahmanyam
5	"Are Jinga Jingaale"	Rajesh Krishnan, K. S. Chitra
6	"Ee Adharadali Garigala"	Rajesh Krishnan, K. S. Chitra
7	"Onde Ondu Maathu" (Bit)	K. S. Chitra
8	"Jeeva Jyothiye"	S. P. Balasubrahmanyam
9	"Bharathambe Ninna Januma Dina"	S. P. Balasubrahmanyam

== Reception ==
A critic from Deccan Herald opined that "The film is truly worthy of the weavers of our national tricolour!" The New Indian Express wrote, "This film may remain as one of the best films of Vishnuvardhan’s career. With his mature acting, the film’s story has been handled with the right touch. He never indulges in overacting".
