= C. B. I. Shiva =

- Directed by: B. Ramamurthy
- Written by: Kunigal Nagabhushan (Dialogues)
- Screenplay by: B. Ramamurthy
- Story by: B. Ramamurthy
- Produced by: Babu; Padma; Vijayalakshmi; Manjunath
- Starring: Tiger Prabhakar; Shruti; Ramesh Aravind; Jaggesh; Tara
- Cinematography: J. G. Krishna
- Edited by: S. Manohar
- Music by: Upendra Kumar
- Production company: Panchami Chitra
- Release date: 1991
- Running time: 128 minutes
- Country: India
- Language: Kannada

C. B. I. Shiva is a 1991 Kannada action drama film directed and written by B. Ramamurthy. The film features an ensemble cast including Tiger Prabhakar, Ramesh Aravind, Sunil, Jaggesh and Shruti along with Madhuri, Sridevi and Avinash in other pivotal roles.

The film featured an original score and soundtrack composed by Upendra Kumar.

== Cast ==
- Tiger Prabhakar as Shiva
- Ramesh Aravind as Bhaskar
- Sunil as Indudhar
- Jaggesh as Chandru
- Shruthi as Shruthi
- Tara as Ranjini
- Madhuri as Devi
- Sridevi as Malathi
- Avinash as Bettappa
- Lohithaswa as Chief Minister Sharanappa
- Kunigal Nagabhushan as Doctor

== Soundtrack ==
The music was composed by Upendra Kumar.

Track listing
No.	Title	Lyrics	Singer(s)	Length
1.	"Ee Novinalu"	Chi. Udaya Shankar	Vishnu, Gururaj
2.	"Hidiva Suryana"	Sriranga	Sangeetha Katti, Srinath, Chandrika Gururaj, L. N. Shastry, Kusuma, Gururaj
