= Chakravarthy Chandrachud =

Indian journalist, writer and actor (born 1977)

- Born: 15 August 1977 (age 49); Devanur, Chikmagalur District, Karnataka
- Education: B.E, M.A. (Psychology)
- Occupations: Journalist, filmmaker
- Spouses: Manjula (1999–?); Shruti (m. 2013; div. 2014)
- Writing career
- Language: Kannada

Chakravarthy Chandrachud (born 15 August 1977) is an Indian journalist, poet, social activist, actor, and film director from Devanur, Karnataka.

== Education ==
Chakravarthy Chandrachud was born on 15 August 1977 in Devanur, Chikmagalur District, Karnataka. He earned a bachelor’s degree in Instrumentation Technology from the Sri Jayachamarajendra College of Engineering (SJCE) in Mysore, India. He later received a postgraduate degree in Psychology at the University of Mysore, followed by an M.Phil. from Kuppam.

== Career ==
Chandrachud's journalism career began during his college days. He worked with Janamitra, a local newspaper in Hassan, and Andolana, a daily newspaper in Mysore. He also contributed to weekly publications such as Hai Bangalore, Agni, and Lankesh Patrike, where he later served as an editor.

=== Books ===
Chandrachud's first book, Jana Jala Kranti, examines the contributions of Anna Hazare and Rajendra Singh to irrigation reform. The book is based on his research conducted in Rajasthan and Maharashtra, and earned him the National Environmental Award.

His other books include Khaali Shilube (The Empty Cross), which was released at a Lingayat cemetery in Chamrajpet, Bangalore and Mailu Tutta, released at Malleshwaram's Dhobi ghat. Mailu Tutta (Katha Bharata) is a narrative chronicling India's evolution through its revolutionary movements.

=== Film and television ===
Chandrachud made his acting debut in the 2019 Kannada film Melobba Mayavi, where he also contributed as a writer.

== Personal life ==
In 1999, Chakravarthy married Manjula. In June 2013, he attempted to enter a second marriage with Kannada actress Shruti; however, the union was annulled by a court later that year on the grounds that he had not legally dissolved his first marriage. Following Manjula’s petition, the court ruled that the second marriage was invalid. Shruti also acknowledged the irregularity of the procedure.
