= Sambhrama =

- Directed by: K. Mahesh Sukhadhare
- Written by: S. V. Krishna Reddy
- Produced by: C. Gopala Krishna; K. V. Narayan; Smt Shamantha Narayan; Dr. Sanjeeva Murthy; Smt Vimala Sanjeeva Murthy; Shreepal Jain
- Starring: Ramesh Aravind; Kaveri; Hema Panchamukhi
- Cinematography: A. C. Mahendran
- Edited by: Nagesh Yadav
- Music by: Hamsalekha
- Production company: Srinivasa Combines
- Release date: 19 March 1999
- Running time: 158 minutes
- Country: India
- Language: Kannada

Sambhrama is a 1999 Kannada-language Indian romance film directed by Mahesh Sukhadare and produced by Srinivasa Combines banner. The story is a remake of the Malayalam film Ee Puzhayum Kadannu (1996).

The film stars Ramesh Aravind and Kaveri in leading roles, with Hema Panchamukhi, Kalyan Kumar, and Srinivasa Murthy, among others, playing supporting roles.

== Plot ==
Anjali (Kaveri) is the third daughter of a deceased music teacher. She lives with her two elder sisters Deepa (Hema Panchamukhi), Roopa (Vanishree) and grandmother (B V Radha). Her life changes when Gopi (Ramesh Aravind) moves to his brother's (Srinivas Murthy) house as her neighbor. They fall in love. However, she hesitates to marry him while her two elder sisters are unmarried. Gopi finds a groom for Ashwathy, but the marriage is called off as she is mute and deaf. After two failed attempts to get her married, they all feel hopeless but out of the blue Gopi's friend admits that he loves Ashwathy, and Gopi helps him marry her. Then they try to get Aarthi married, but she admits to never having gotten over her old boyfriend. They then track him down and ask him to marry her. He admits to liking her, but says that his mother would ask for a lot of dowry. Gopi does everything he can, including making his brother loan out his house in order to obtain the money and the ornaments they demanded, which are provided by Aarthi's boyfriend himself.

However, that night, when their drunkard step-brother Raghu steals the ornaments from Anjali's house, Gopi finds him and accidentally kills him. He confesses to Anjali that he killed him, but they hide this until Aarthi's wedding is over. Eventually Gopi is arrested in front of the wedding guests.

After five years, when Gopi comes back from jail, Anjali and her whole family are waiting for him, and the movie ends on a positive note.

== Cast ==
- Ramesh Aravind as Gopi
- Kaveri as Anjali
- Hema Panchamukhi as Deepa
- Kalyan Kumar
- Vanishree as Roopa
- B. V. Radha as Anjali, Deepa, and Roopa's grandmother
- H. G. Dattatreya
- Karibasavaiah
- Srinivasa Murthy as Gopi's brother
- M. N. Lakshmi Devi
- Surekha
- Nagesh Yadav
- Poorvi Kulkarni

== Soundtrack ==
The music was composed by Hamsalekha for Jhankar music company. All the songs had lyrics written by him.

Track listing
No.	Title	Lyrics	Singer(s)	Length
1.	"Namaskara Ninage Bhaskara"	Hamsalekha	Anuradha Sriram, Ramesh Chandra
2.	"Yaaru Bhoomige"	Hamsalekha	S. P. Balasubrahmanyam
3.	"O Bhoorame"	Hamsalekha	K. S. Chithra
4.	"What A Smile"	Hamsalekha	S. P. Balasubrahmanyam, K. S. Chithra
5.	"Hubli Hudugi"	Hamsalekha	S. P. Balasubrahmanyam, Anuradha Sriram

== Reception ==
Y Maheswara Reddy of The Indian Express wrote "THOUGH it is a re-make of the Telugu movie Pellipeetalu, Sambhrama is like a cool shower on a hot summer day. Director Mahesh Sukhadhare, who is making his debut with this film, has succeeded in making a film that is good, clean fun." Srikanth Srinivasa of the Deccan Herald wrote, "Sambhrama comes like a whiff of fresh air. The right kind of film for a family audience. Though this flick is a remake of the Telugu film Pelli Peetalu, director Mahesh Sukhadhare has captured the beauty and essence of the Malnad region".

== See also ==
- Ee Puzhayum Kadannu
- Pelli Peetalu
