= Mahalakshmi (film) =

- Directed by: Karthik Raghunath
- Written by: Rudramurthy Shastry (dialogue)
- Screenplay by: Raja Venkataramanan
- Story by: G. R. C. C. Katha Vibhaga
- Produced by: K. Madanlal
- Starring: Ramesh Aravind; Kumar Govind; Shruti
- Cinematography: R. R. Rajkumar
- Edited by: P. R. Sounder Rajan
- Music by: N. Govardhan
- Production company: Gloria Rakesh Cine Circuit
- Release date: 16 February 2001
- Country: India
- Language: Kannada

Mahalakshmi is a 2001 Indian Kannada-language romantic drama film directed by Karthik Raghunath and starring Ramesh Aravind, Kumar Govind and Shruti in the titular role. The film was released to negative reviews.

== Plot ==
Mahalakshmi and Shyam are married, but Shyam is often busy with work. He dies in a car crash. To overcome her grief, Mahalakshmi works as a nurse and marries Ramanna a.k.a. Ram. Ram brings home Karna, an amnesia patient, whom Mahalakshmi suspects to be Shyam. What happens after Karna undergoes an operation and regains his memory forms the rest of the story.

== Cast ==
- Ramesh Aravind as Shyam alias Karna
- Kumar Govind as Ramanna a.k.a. Ram
- Shruti as Mahalakshmi
- Srinivasa Murthy as Colonel A. S. Chandrashekar
- Mandya Ramesh as Raju
- Kumaraswamy Nayak as Rukmini's husband
- Jayanthi as Ram's mother
- Ashalatha as Rukmini
- Vanishree as Raju's mother

== Production ==
The director worked on several Tamil films for two decades before making his Kannada debut with this film.

== Soundtrack ==
The music was composed by N. Govardhan, who won the Karnataka State Film Award for Best Music Director.

| Song | Singer(s) | Lyricist |
|---|---|---|
| "Thaala Mela" | Butto, Manjula Gururaj | T. Ramesh Rao |
| "Aakashadache" | Rajesh Krishnan, Nanditha | T. Ramesh Rao |
| "Kannu Kannu" | Ramesh Chandra, Nanditha | T. Ramesh Rao |
| "Neenu Yaarendu Helalu" | | |
| "Haaruva Hakkige" | B. R. Chaya | Rudramurthy Shastry |

== Reception ==
A critic from Chitraloka.com wrote that the director "fails to evoke the needed response. He has been fast in his narration but all that is not enough. His brilliance needed some more thought so that it could have been a slick film". A critic from indiainfo.com wrote that "All in all, Mahalaxmi is like watching a tele-film".
