= Akka Thangi =

- DVD cover
- Directed by: S. Mahendar
- Written by: S. Mahendar
- Screenplay by: S. Mahendar
- Produced by: Ramesh Yadav
- Starring: Shruti; Rashmi
- Cinematography: B. Suresh Babu
- Edited by: P. R. Soundar Raj
- Music by: V. Manohar
- Production company: Ramesh Yadav Movies
- Release date: 5 December 2008
- Running time: 138 minutes
- Country: India
- Language: Kannada

Akka Thangi (transl. Elder sister, younger sister) is a 2008 Indian Kannada language film written and directed by S. Mahendar. It stars Shruti and Rashmi in the lead roles. The supporting cast features Mohan, Kishore and Sharan.

== Cast ==
- Shruti as Nagi
- Rashmi as Kaveri, Nagi's sister
- Mohan
- Kishore as Huliyappa
- Sharan
- Vaijanath Biradar
- Shankar Rao
- Siddaraj Kalyankar
- Dr. Manu
- Namratha
- M. N. Lakshmi Devi
- Kishori Ballal
- Padmaja Rao
- Baby Sahana
- Baby Padmavathi
- Baby Shravanishree
- Master Bharath Venkatadri
- Master Rakesh

== Soundtrack ==
Akka Thangi

Soundtrack album by V. Manohar
- Released: 2007
- Genre: Feature film soundtrack
- Label: R Music

V. Manohar composed the film's background score and music for its soundtrack. The album consists of five tracks.

Tracklist
No.	Title	Lyrics	Singer(s)	Length
1.	"Dharani Mandala"	S. Mahendar	Chithra
2.	"Thangaali"	K. Kalyan	Chithra
3.	"Tuvvi Tuvvi"	Kaviraj	Rajesh Krishnan, Nanditha
4.	"Badavanadare"	Satyananda Pathrota	S. Mahendar
5.	"Maadeva Maadeva"	K. Kalyan	Hemanth Kumar, Nanditha

== Critical reception ==
Upon theatrical release, the film received positive reviews from critics. R. G. Vijayasarathy of Rediff rated the film 3.5/5 and called it "an emotionally engaging film made on a reasonable budget with a strong story, good narration and pleasing music." On the acting performances he wrote, "... Shruti makes a deep impression as the elder sister. Kishore in the role of Huliyappa who stands out with another strong performance." He added, "V Manohar's music is the other plus point of the film." A critic from the IANS gave the film the same rating and wrote, "Watch Akka Thangi for its good story content and great performances". A critic from the Bangalore Mirror wrote, "Akka Tangi thankfully does not descend into tear-jerking mode. The sentiments are subtle. The comedy is likable without double entendre. This is a complete family entertainer which you cannot dare to miss".
