= Oral Mathram =

- Directed by: Sathyan Anthikkad
- Written by: S. N. Swamy
- Starring: Mammootty; Thilakan; Shruti; Sreenivasan; Sudheesh; Lalu Alex
- Cinematography: Vipin Mohan
- Edited by: K. Rajagopal
- Music by: Johnson
- Release date: 1 September 1997
- Running time: 149 minutes
- Country: India
- Language: Malayalam

Oral Mathram (Only One Person) is a 1997 Malayalam film directed by Sathyan Anthikkad. The film stars Mammootty, Thilakan, Shruti, Kavya Madhavan, Sreenivasan, Sudheesh and Lalu Alex.

== Plot ==
Shekhara Menon is a retired income tax officer from Mumbai and has now settled in a remote village in Kerala. He owns some land and a house where he, his three daughters, and Menon's elderly father live together and leads a calm, silent and happy life. Menon owns a smaller house adjacent to his own which is given for rent, and is his source of income other than agricultural income. Mr. Menon's Pension from the service has been blocked due to some unclear issues. Hareendran is a struggling small-time contractor and comes in as a new tenant to the rented house. Hareendran is constantly put under unwanted troubles by his aide Balachandran, who convinces Hareendran to help people in trouble. His experience with Balachandran has made Hareendran a selfish man and he presently is least concerned about other people's problems around him.

But the things take a change after Menon goes absconding leaving three daughters and the grandfather alone in the house. Hareendran, the selfish tenant quickly decides to vacate the house to avoid unwanted troubles. Even though selfish and unkind outside, the good-hearted Hareendran cannot stand the harsh difficulties forced to be faced by the girls in front of his house and rest of the story is about how only Hareendran (Oral Mathram -> the only person) steps up to help the girls.

After Shekhara Menon's disappearance his aged father starts doubting that he is no longer alive since he has not returned to see them for a long time. Eventually he dies out of grief. Hareendran approaches the District Collector with a request to speed up the police investigation which leads SI Mathew Varghese to find out that Shekhara Menon has travelled to Mumbai some days back, based on the ticket he took from the railway station. He also finds a co-traveler Hameed who was able to confirm this since he travelled with Menon that day briefly. Hareendran further seeks the help of his now suspended CI friend Sachi who deduces after meeting Menon's daughters that there is no chance of Menon absconding and would’ve been dead by now in all likeness. Meanwhile, Hareendran is approached by Kunjachan, a manager who wants Hareendran to undertake a wedding hall construction project on behalf of his boss settled at USA. Hareendran is confused as he is attacked by a couple of goons one night and his current project work getting halted midway under mysterious circumstances due to government issues. Sachi, on investigating further at Mumbai railway stations, find out that the train had Menon's reservation, but he never turned up for the trip and was mentioned as a ‘no show’ in the records. Hareendran and Sachi round up Hameed and beat him up to get the truth from him since it was now evident that he was lying about Menon travelling with him. He does not divulge anything even after intense questioning and physical torture but blurts out the name KRK while semi-conscious. On checking with Mathew Varghese, Hareendran and Sachi find out that KRK might be the name for KR Kuttikrishnan, a wealthy business owner who had got rich quickly and is notorious for his fraudulent ways. Sachi and Hareendran decide to visit KRK at his office and while there Hareendran is shocked to learn that KRK is the same person as Kunjachan. Hari lures him to his construction site pretending to discuss about the new project and beats him up there.

It is revealed that KRK was Menon's subordinate before in Income Tax department and was a highly corrupt employee. Based on Menon's action, he was imprisoned for 3 years which lead to his family getting humiliated and his sister's wedding getting cancelled. KRK soon becomes rich with his corrupt ways, getting hell bent on revenge at Menon. He starts blocking all alliances coming for Menon's elder daughter Devika using his wealth, power, and connections. Menon, too late to realize that KRK was all along behind his pension fund issue and his daughter's wedding problems, confronts KRK and requests him to stay out of his daughter's life. There is a struggle between the two where KRK kills Menon. To divert the case, he books a dummy ticket to Mumbai under Menon's name and has Hameed give false witness to the police to confirm his story. KRK goes behind bars and Sachi joins the force back, leaving Hareendran as the sole supporter for the 3 girls now.

== Cast ==
- Mammootty as Hareendranath
- Shruti as Devika Menon
- Thilakan as Shekhara Menon
- Sreenivasan as CI Sachidanandan
- Sudheesh as Balachandran
- Lalu Alex as SI Mathew Varghese
- Praveena as Malavika Menon
- Kavya Madhavan as Gopika Menon
- Sindhu as Engineer
- Unnikrishnan Namboothiri as Muthasshan, Menon's aged father
- Oduvil Unnikrishnan as Pankunny Menon
- Vishnuprakash as Kunjachan / K.R.Kuttikrishnan (KRK)
- Mamukkoya as Kunjhalikutty
- Sankaradi as Nambiar, the tea shop owner
- Mahesh as Hameed

== Soundtrack ==
Oral Mathram

Soundtrack album by Johnson
- Genre: Film
- Language: Malayalam

The film features songs composed by Johnson and written by Kaithapram.

Song title	Singer
"Aardramaay Chandrakalabham"	K. J. Yesudas
"Aardramaay Chandrakalabham"	K. S. Chithra
"Chaithranilaavinte"	K. J. Yesudas
"Kaarvarnane Kando Sakhi"	K. J. Yesudas
"Kaarvarnane Kando Sakhi"	K. S. Chithra
"Mangalappaala"	K. S. Chithra
