= Rani Channamma University, Belagavi =

State University in Karnataka

Rani Channamma University
- Motto: Vidvāna sarvatra pūjyate
- Type: Public
- Established: 2010
- Affiliations: UGC
- Chancellor: Governor of Karnataka
- Vice-Chancellor: Vijay F. Nagannavar
- Location: Belgaum, Karnataka, India, India; 16°0′16.7″N 74°30′18.9″E
- Campus: Rural
- Website: Official website

Rani Channamma University is a public university in Belgaum established by the government of Karnataka in 2010. It was created by upgrading Kittur Rani Channamma Post Graduate Centre at Belgaum which was established by the Karnatak University, Dharwad in 1982.

The university is recognised by University Grants Commission and accredited by National Assessment and Accreditation Council (NAAC). As of 2021, Rani Channamma University has been awarded "Grade B+" by the NAAC.

In December 2025, RTI activist Dattatreya Kulkarni filed a complaint with the Karnataka Lokayukta alleging irregularities in the procurement of marks cards and degree certificates at the university. According to media reports, the complaint named Vice-Chancellor Prof. C. M. Thyagaraja, Registrar Santosh Kamagouda, former Registrar (Evaluation) Ravindranath N. Kadam, and Finance Officer M. A. Sapna. The complaint alleged tender manipulation and procurement-rule violations. The allegations were reported to be under review by the Lokayukta

The main aim of this university is to provide an opportunity to develop access to for higher education for students from North Karnataka Region which is deprived of good educational facilities.

Rani Channamma University has a main campus, called "Vidyasangama", as its headquarters, on 172 acres of land near Bhutaramanahatti, adjacent to the Pune–Bangalore National Highway 4, about 18 km from Belgavi city. It has been functioning with the jurisdiction of Belgavi, Bijapur and Bagalkot districts.
