= Rama Shama Bhama =

2005 film by Ramesh Aravind

- Directed by: Ramesh Aravind
- Written by: Yashwant Sardeshpande, Rajendra Karanth (dialogues)
- Screenplay by: Ramesh Aravind
- Story by: Balu Mahendra
- Based on: Sathi Leelavathi (1995) by Balu Mahendra
- Produced by: K. Manju
- Starring: Ramesh Arvind; Kamal Haasan; Urvashi; Shruthi; Daisy Bopanna; Anirudh
- Cinematography: PKH Das
- Edited by: Nagendra Urs
- Music by: Gurukiran
- Production company: Lakshmishree Combines
- Distributed by: Raaj Kamal Films International
- Release date: 9 December 2005
- Running time: 141 minutes
- Country: India
- Language: Kannada

Rama Shama Bhama is a 2005 Indian Kannada-language comedy film directed by Ramesh Aravind, making his directorial debut. The film stars Aravind in the lead role, with Kamal Haasan, Urvashi, Daisy Bopanna and Shruthi portraying supporting roles.

The film revolves around a married cartoonist Rama who has an affair with Priya. When she finds out about his personal life, she still continuously pursues him. The rest of the film revolves around Rama reuniting with his wife, who plans to win him back with the help of his friend. The film was produced by K. Manju. The cinematography and editing was handled by PKH Dass and Nagendra Urs. The film's soundtrack was composed by Gurukiran.

The film was a remake of the 1995 Tamil film, Sathi Leelavathi which itself was inspired by the 1989 film She Devil. The film was critical and a commercial success, and completed a 16-week run at a theatre in Bangalore.

== Plot ==
Priya (Daisy Bopanna) is an orphan who faced hardships in her childhood. Now as an adult she dreams of having a comfortable and luxurious life by seeking a rich man who will love her and provide everything for her. Raja (Aniruddha Jatkar), is a colleague of Priya who is in love with her, but Priya rejects his love as he is not affluent.

Ram (Ramesh Aravind) is a professional cartoonist with a successful career and family. He lives with his wife, Bhama Mani (Urvashi), and their two children Ravi (Master Goutham) and Gowri (Baby Priyanka), and his father Rangaswamy (H. G. Dattatreya). One day when Ram is looking to buy an apartment, he contacts the real estate company where Priya works. Priya shows him around the apartment and soon they begin to have an affair. Priya has no idea that Ram is married and has children.

Ram and Priya decide to go to Goa on a 3-day vacation and while at the airport ready to depart, Ram's college friend Dr.Shyam Sajjan (Kamal Haasan) bumps into him. Dr. Shyam Sajjan is a bit eccentric and never leaves Ram's side even though Ram tries to get rid of him on multiple occasions. Ram wants to conceal his affair with Priya from Dr. Shyam Sajjan as he is aware of Ram's family and children. Ram successfully tries to evade Dr. Shyam on the aircraft by lying that he is going to stay with his friend but again gets caught in the hotel reception while trying to check-in. Ram still pretends that he doesn't know Priya and Priya goes along with the deception. In the night, while Ram is trying to carry Priya to bed, he has a muscle pull and is injured. Upon the unavailability of a hotel doctor, the hotel requests if any guest who is a doctor can help Ram. Dr. Shyam Sajjan shows up and discovers that Ram has been lying all along and is indeed having an affair with Priya. He tries to warn Ram that it is not the right thing to do, but Ram blind in love, rejects Dr. Shyam's advice.

Ram returns from Goa and almost gets caught by his wife, as he has lied to his wife that he is going to Delhi on official work. Ram keeps lying to his wife repeatedly, however one day is caught red handed hanging out with Priya. Bhama mani throws a tantrum and gives Ram a choice to either end the affair and come back or go and stay with Priya. Ram chooses Priya and starts living with her in the apartment. Now Bhama mani is heart broken but is determined to win back her husband. To teach him a lesson, Bhama mani sends Ram's father, his two children to Priya's house. Chaos ensues in Priya's life as the two children is a handful and Ram's father being of older generation cannot adopt modern day life style. This creates a friction between Ram and Priya. Ultimately, Priya gets rid of Ram's father and his two children.

Now, Bhama mani is heartbroken again as her plan did not work. So, Bhama mani plots a new plan taking Dr. Shyam's help. The plan is to get Priya's colleague Raja (who loved her once) to Dr Shyam's house and without his knowledge invite Priya and get them to talk it out. And in the meanwhile, even Ram is invited without Raja's or Priya's knowledge and make Ram see Raja and Priya together. The plan goes well, Raja and Priya unite, meanwhile Ram apologies to Bhama mani and begs her to accept him back. Everything works out well for everyone until suddenly Dr. Shyam's wife Shanti (Shruti) shows up unexpectedly who was at her mother's place earlier and had decided to come back home without informing her husband Dr. Shyam Sajjan. When Priya is thanking Dr. Shyam Sajjan by hugging him as a brother, Shanti mistakes that her husband is having an affair with Priya. Again chaos ensues and things go out of control when Priya, Raja, Ram and Bahama mani falls into the swimming pool and Shanti takes off in anger in the family car. Their son who is a prankster without knowledge of what's going on, had removed the brakes from the car. Dr. Shyam Sajjan and his son now follows Shanti on a motorcycle and after lots of chaos ultimately returns to their family home. After explaining Shanti understands that this is all a misunderstanding and her husband is indeed innocent.

In the last scene all the happy couple, Raja and Priya, Ram and Bhama mani, Dr. Shyam Sajjan and Shanti dance in joy.

== Cast ==
- Ramesh Aravind as Rama
- Kamal Haasan as Shyama Sajjan
- Urvashi as Bhama Mani aka Peddus
- Shruti as Shanti
- Daisy Bopanna as Priya
- Aniruddha Jatkar as Raja
- H. G. Dattatreya as Rangaswamy, Ram's father
- Manikantha Surya
- Prathima Devi as Ram's neighbour
- Yashwanth Sardeshpande as A. Satyamurthy, co-passenger
- Shashank as Shyam's son (credited as Master Shashank)
- Goutham as Ravi (credited as Master Goutham)
- Priyanka as Gowri (credited as Baby Priyanka)
- M. S. Umesh as Srikantha Murthy
- Rajendra Karanth as resident in flat
- K. Praveen Nayak as a guy in washroom
- Imran Sardhariya

== Production ==
This film marked the directorial debut of actor Ramesh Arvind. It also marked the appearance of Kamal Haasan in Kannada films after 17 years. An early working title was Stree Samanya.

== Soundtrack ==
Rama Shama Bhama

Soundtrack album by Gurukiran
- Released: 2005
- Genre: Feature film soundtrack
- Label: Ashwini Audio
- Producer: Gurukiran

Gurukiran composed the background score and soundtrack music for the film. The lyrics for the soundtracks were penned by Kaviraj and Goturi. The album has two songs.

Track listing
No.	Title	Lyrics	Singer(s)	Length
1.	"Pade Pade Nenapade"	Kaviraj	Chithra, Ramesh Chandra
2.	"Jopana Raathri"	Goturi	Shamitha Malnad, Gurukiran, Gururaj Hoskote

== Critical reception ==
Writing for Rediff, R. G. Vijayasarathy wrote, "Ramesh wields the megaphone for the first time and comes out in flying colours." He praised the performances of the actors and the dialogues, and concluded calling the film "a wholesome family entertainer." Sify wrote, "Kamal Hassan has scored full marks with Hubli- Dharwad accent and perfect histrionics required for a comedy riot" and added, "Camera of P K H Das and catchy dialogues by Yeshwanth Sardeshpande are added attractions." S. N. Deepak of Deccan Herald reviewed the film and praised the performances of all the actors, the camerawork and the dialogues.
