= Kizhakku Cheemayile =

1993 film by Bharathiraja

- Theatrical release poster
- Directed by: Bharathiraja
- Screenplay by: Bharathiraja
- Story by: M. Rathnakumar
- Produced by: Kalaipuli S. Thanu
- Starring: Vijayakumar; Radikaa; Napoleon
- Cinematography: B. Kannan
- Edited by: K. Pazhanivel
- Music by: A. R. Rahman
- Production company: V Creations
- Release date: 13 November 1993
- Running time: 147 minutes
- Country: India
- Language: Tamil

Kizhakku Cheemayile (pronounced [kiɻakku tɕiːmajileː] transl. In the east border) is a 1993 Indian Tamil-language drama film directed by Bharathiraja. It stars Vijayakumar, Radikaa and Napoleon in the lead roles, while Vignesh, Pandiyan and Vadivelu play supporting roles. The film involves a touching sentimental story between a brother and a sister. The music was scored by A. R. Rahman, marking his first of several collaborations with Bharathiraja.

Kizhakku Cheemayile was released on 13 November 1993, during Diwali, and became a commercial success. The film was remade in Telugu as Palnati Pourusham (1994) and unofficially in Kannada as Gowdru (2004).

== Plot ==
Maayaandi Thevan is very fond of his younger sister Virumaayi. She too pours love and affection on him. Virumaayi is married to Sivanaandi from the neighbouring village. Sivanaandi's brother-in-law Periya Karuppu does not like Maayaandi and tries to create a rift between them. During a village festival, Periya Karuppu creates a problem between Maayaandi and Sivanaandi, causing the family to split. Periya Karuppu's wife realises this and commits suicide. Thinking that Maayaandi is the reason for this, Sivanaandi breaks all ties with him and forbids Virumaayi from seeing her brother. Periya Karuppu dies soon after.

Years pass, and Maayaandi's son Seenu returns to the village after studying in the city. He sees his cousin Virumaayi's daughter Pechchi, and they both rekindle their love. Sivanaandi finds out about this and tries to separate the couple. He arranges Pechchi's wedding with his nephew Chinna Karuppu, a spoiled brat and womaniser. Pechchi, with her mother's help, escapes home and meets Seenu.

A fight ensues between the two villages, with Maayaandi and Sivanaandi accusing each other of what Pechchi and Seenu did. Chinna Karuppu fights with Seenu, and Seenu wins. Chinna Karuppu says he is not an enemy to their love but hates his uncle Sivanaandi as he did not help his father Periya Karuppu, leading to his death. At the fighting ground, Virumaayi asks Maayaandi to spare her husband's life, but Sivanaandi tries to kill Maayaandi. Virumaayi comes in between and gets wounded in the neck by Sivanaandi, much to everyone's shock. She removes the nuptial string from her neck, declaring that she does not have any more relationship with Sivanaandi, and dies in her brother Maayaandi's arms. Maayaandi carries Virumaayi, while a devastated Sivanaandi looks from afar.

== Cast ==
- Vijayakumar as Maayaandi Thevan
- Radikaa as Virumaayi
- Napoleon as Sivanaandi
- Vignesh as Seenu
- Pandiyan as Chinna Karuppu
- Vadivelu as Ochchu
- R. V. Aswini as Pechchi
- Viji Chandrasekhar as Kaudari
- Suryakanth as Periya Karuppu
- Rajaguru Ramarajan as Accountant
- Sujatha
- Vijaya
- S. J. Suryah as a bull trainer (uncredited role)
- Sevvalai Rasu as a villager (uncredited role)
- Kalyan in a special appearance

== Production ==
Screenwriter M. Rathnakumar first approached Kalaipuli S. Thanu to produce this film. Thanu liked the script, worked on it with him, and then asked him to narrate it to Bharathiraja, saying he is the appropriate person to direct the film. The project became a reality after he came on board. The film was made on first copy basis by Bharathiraja for the producer at a cost of ₹80 lakhs. Originally, Rajkiran was considered for the lead role. However, when his salary expectation was too high, Vijayakumar was finally selected for the role. Radikaa was initially reluctant to accept playing the female lead since she had just given birth, but when Bharathiraja persuaded her, she relented. Poet Arivumathi worked as an assistant with this film. Thavasi made his debut through this film. Vadivelu, who played a supporting role, was fired by Bharathiraja after asking a then substantial remuneration of ₹25,000 (equivalent to ₹180,000 or US$1,900 in 2023), but reinstated after Thanu empathised with him and promised to pay the same.

== Soundtrack ==
The soundtrack was composed by A. R. Rahman and lyrics written by Vairamuthu. Kizhakku Cheemayile was the first of five films in which Bharathiraja and Rahman worked together. The songs gained Rahman notice for composing folk music, contrary to his reputation for composing westernised music.

Song	Artist(s)	Length
"Maanooththu Manthaiyile"	S. P. Balasubrahmanyam, B. S. Sasirekha	5:15
"Aathangara Marame"	Mano, Sujatha Mohan	4:54
"Edhukku Pondatti"	Shahul Hameed, T. K. Kala, Sunanda	4:13
"Then Kizhakku Cheemayile I"	K. S. Chithra, Malaysia Vasudevan	5:41
"Kathaazha Kaattu Vazhi"	S. Janaki, P. Jayachandran	4:33
"Then Kizhakku Cheemayile II"	K. S. Chithra, Malaysia Vasudevan	1:41

== Marketing and release ==
Thanu advertised the film using only Bharathiraja, Rahman and Vairamuthu in the wall posters on the launch date, feeling they were more popular than the artistes. For the first time, computerised digital designing method was used to print posters and publicity materials. Kizhakku Cheemayile was released on 13 November 1993, Diwali day.

== Reception ==
Malini Mannath of The Indian Express wrote, "With some sterling performances [..] and some emotion-charged scenes that move the viewer, Kizhakku Cheemayile may not be the classic Bharatiraja film, but it is a good film that makes you forget its flaws." Seetha Ravi of Kalki gave a more mixed review, though she appreciated the performances of Radikaa, Vijayakumar and Napoleon.

== Accolades ==
Event	Category	Recipient	Ref.
1993 Tamil Nadu State Film Awards	Best Actor (Special Prize)	Vijayakumar	
1993 Tamil Nadu State Film Awards	Best Male Playback Singer	Jayachandran (for "Kathaazha Kaattu Vazhi")	
14th Cinema Express Awards	Best Film	Kalaipuli S. Thanu	
14th Cinema Express Awards	Best Director	Bharathiraja	
14th Cinema Express Awards	Best Actress	Radhika	
14th Cinema Express Awards	Best Villain	Napoleon	
14th Cinema Express Awards	Best Comedy Actor	Vadivelu	

== Remakes ==
Kizhakku Cheemayile was remade in Telugu as Palnati Pourusham (1994) and unofficially in Kannada as Gowdru (2004).

== Bibliography ==
- Dhananjayan, G. (2011). The Best of Tamil Cinema, 1931 to 2010: 1977–2010. Galatta Media. OCLC 733724281.
- Trilok, Krishna (18 September 2018). Notes of a Dream: The Authorized Biography of A.R. Rahman. India: Penguin Random House. ISBN 978-9353051969.
