= 100 (2021 film) =

2021 Kannada film by Ramesh Arvind

- Theatrical release poster
- Directed by: Ramesh Aravind
- Written by: Ramesh Aravind (additional screenplay)
- Based on: Thiruttu Payale 2 by Susi Ganesan
- Produced by: M. Ramesh Reddy; Uma
- Starring: Ramesh Aravind; Rachita Ram; Poorna; Vishwa Karna
- Cinematography: Satya Hegde
- Edited by: Akash Srivatsa
- Music by: Ravi Basrur
- Production company: Suraj Productions
- Distributed by: Lilac Entertainments; Jagadeesh Films
- Release date: 19 November 2021
- Country: India
- Language: Kannada

100 is a 2021 Indian Kannada-language crime thriller film directed by Ramesh Aravind. The film stars himself, Rachita Ram, Poorna, and newcomer Vishwa Karna. It is a remake of the Tamil film Thiruttu Payale 2. The film released on November 19, 2021.

== Plot ==
Inspector Vishnu is an honest officer, who is living with his family- his mother, younger sister Hima and wife Anagha where he is also involved in benami dealings. Vishnu's boss asks him to tap the phone calls of a few senior officers and politicians to track their illegal activities. Vishnu learns that the politicians' wives and other women, including Anagha, are having affairs with Harsha, a sociopath and cybercriminal, who seduces woman to fall for him and blackmails them for money.

Vishnu confronts Harsha, who blackmails him by hacking Vishnu's personal computer and downloaded the audio recordings that Vishnu has collected so far. It is revealed that Vishnu was involved in the dealings, in order to construct a hospital for the poor. Harsha leaks the call of DGP in order to get Vishnu into trouble. However, Vishnu is instead congratulated by his boss for publicly removing the DGP from competing. When the scandal escalates, The higher-ups in the department decide to frame Vishnu as the scapegoat to save their name.

Meanwhile, Vishnu plants bugs at his house where he learns that Hima was having an affair with Harsha, not Anagha. Hima met Harsha in Facebook. When he called her to sleep with him, she learnt about his true nature and blocks his phone number, but was blackmailing by calling her from different numbers. Hima confronts Harsha and tries to have sex with her, but escapes and she learnt that he made a lascivious photos on her and is torturing her since.

Realizing that his higher-ups are framing him, Vishnu blackmails his higher-ups with their audio recordings that he is heading to kill Harsha and the charges against him should be dropped. The higher-ups follow Vishnu's orders where Vishnu kidnaps Harsha and kills him at his guest house. Vishnu returns to work and decide to expose many cyber criminals, who are targeting women for their personal benefits.

== Cast ==
- Ramesh Aravind as Vishnu, cybercrime officer
- Rachita Ram as Hima, Vishnu's sister
- Poorna as Ananga, Vishnu's wife
- Vishwa Karna as Harsha, a cyber criminal
- Prakash Belawadi as IGP Siddharama
- Raju Talikote
- Shobaraj as DGP Surya Prakash
- Amita Ranganath

== Production ==
The film is produced by M Ramesh Reddy and Uma under Suraj Productions. Akash Shrivatsa worked as an editor for this film.

== Soundtrack ==
Music is composed by Ravi Basrur.

No.	Title	Lyrics	Singer(s)	Length
1.	"Rangu Rangu Partyge"	Kinnal Raj, Pramod Maravante, Baskar Bangera	Ramesh Arvind, Ananya Bhat, Neethu Subramanyan	4.00

== Release ==
100 was released on 19 November 2021 and received positive reviews from critics.

=== Critical response ===
A. Sharaadha of The New Indian Express wrote "The timing of this film is noteworthy considering digital crime is on the rise. 100 is an attempt at sensitising audiences about the crime". Jagadish Angadi of Deccan Herald gave 4 out of 5 stars and wrote "Ramesh Aravind's '100', a masterfully crafted cyber crime drama, proves this. The seasoned artiste brings in his experience to craft a near-perfect suspense thriller. It's hard to find faults in the film as it shines in all departments". Madiri of Bangalore Mirror gave 4 out of 5 stars and wrote "Ramesh Aravind has balanced direction and playing the lead role well." Sunayana Suresh of The Times of India gave 3.5 out of 5 stars and wrote "100 has a pertinent message that deals with how social media has taken over most lives. This can be a good choice for a family movie outing for this weekend".
