= Sathyavan Savithri =

- DVD cover
- Directed by: Ramesh Arvind
- Screenplay by: Ramesh Aravind
- Story by: Rajendra Karanth
- Based on: Fleur de cactus and Cactus Flower (1969)
- Produced by: Ajay Chandani
- Starring: Ramesh Aravind; Daisy Bopanna; Jennifer Kotwal
- Cinematography: PKH Das
- Edited by: P. R. Soundar Rajan
- Music by: Gurukiran
- Production company: Ajay Films
- Release date: 29 June 2007
- Running time: 137 minutes
- Country: India
- Language: Kannada

Sathyavan Savithri is a 2007 Indian Kannada-language comedy film directed by Ramesh Aravind, who costars alongside Jennifer Kotwal and Daisy Bopanna. The story written by Rajendra Karanth, is inspired by a famous French play Fleur de cactus by Pierre Barillet and Jean-Pierre Gredy which was also made in English as Cactus Flower (1969) and Hindi as Maine Pyaar Kyun Kiya? (2005). It features soundtrack and score by Gurukiran.

== Plot ==
The film is about the hilarious incidents that happen in a dentist Sathyavan's (Ramesh Aravind) life. He is a big time flirt and doesn't believe in marriage. His grandfather (Dattatreya) plays a game of handing over his luxurious property to a charitable trust if he does not heed to the request of marriage. Sathyavan meets a girl Monisha (Jennifer Kotwal) and tries to woo her for marriage. Meanwhile, another girl Subbulakshmi (Daisy Bopanna) comes into his life as his secretary and the story focuses on whom Sathyavan chooses to marry.

== Cast ==
- Ramesh Aravind as Sathyavan
- Jennifer Kotwal as Monisha
- Daisy Bopanna as Subbulakshmi
- Nethra
- Mohan Shankar
- Aniruddh
- Komal Kumar
- H. G. Dattatreya
- Sadashiva Brahmavar
- Sundar Raj
- Shobha Raghavendra
- Pal Chandani

== Soundtrack ==
The music was composed by Gurukiran for Anand Audio company. The audio was launched and released to the market on 13 June 2007. The song "Dr. Sathya" is heavily inspired from Doctor Jones song performed by Danish-based dance group Aqua.

Track listing
No.	Title	Lyrics	Singer(s)	Length
1.	"Dr. Sathya"	Kaviraj	Gurukiran, Chaitra H. G.	4:45
2.	"First Time Ninna Nodidaaga"	Kaviraj	Lakshmi Manmohan	4:46
3.	"Hello Boys"	Rajendra Karanth	Apoorva Sridhar, L. N. Shastry, Gurukiran	4:24

== Reception ==
Upon release, the film met with favorable critical reviews for its comical content and character portrayals. Rediff.com reviewed with 3.5 stars saying the film is hilarious and is an enjoyable fare for family audiences. Deccan Herald reviewed saying the film is a clean entertainer.

== See also ==
- Cactus Flower (film)
- Maine Pyar Kyun Kiya?
