= Kishori Ballal =

Indian actress (died 2020)

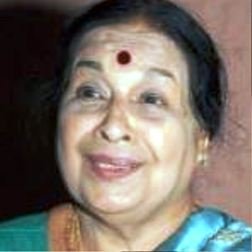
- Born: 1937/1938; Mangaluru, Kingdom of Mysuru, British India
- Died: 18 February 2020 (aged 82); Bengaluru
- Occupation: Actress
- Years active: 1960–2020
- Spouse: N Sripathi Ballal

Kishori Ballal (1937/1938 – 18 February 2020) was an Indian actress who was known for her works in Kannada cinema.

The actress made her debut in 1960 with Ivalentha Hendthi and since then in a career spanning over 15 years, she has appeared in 72 films and along the way has worked with some of the most renowned directors and stalwart actors. Apart from Kannada film, the actress has also worked in Hindi films most notably as the caretaker of Shah Rukh Khan in the critically acclaimed Swades. Television roles include the matriarch in long running serial Amruthavarshini.

She died on 18 February 2020 due to age-related ailments.

== Filmography ==
Kannada

- 2000 Hats Off India
- 2000 Sparsha
- 2003 Khushi (as Kishori Balal)
- 2005 Nammanna (as Kishori Balal)
- 2008 Akka Thangi (as Kishori Balal)
- 2009 Jolly Days as Ankita's grandmother
- 2010 Vaare Vah
- 2011 Kempe Gowda as Kavya's grandmother (as Kishori Balal)
- 2013 Galaate (as Kishori Balal)
- 2014 Aakramana
- 2015 Bombay Mittai (as Kishori Balal)
- 2015 Ring Road as Grandmother (as Kishori Balal)
- 2016 Mahaveera Machideva
- 2016 Naani (as Kishori Balal)
- 2016 Kahi as Ajji

Hindi

- 1989 Gair Kaanooni (as Kishori Bhallal)
- 2003 Ek Alag Mausam
- 2004 Swades as Kaveri Amma
- 2010 Lafangey Parindey
- 2012 Aiyyaa as Surya's mother
- 2016 Aasra

Telugu

- 2007 Aadavari Matalaku Arthale Verule as Kusumamba
- 2010 Varudu
- 2011 Panjaa

English

- 2009 Quick Gun Murugun as Mrs. S.G. Murugun

Tulu

- 2012 Bangarda Kural

Marathi

- 2015 Carry On Maratha (as Kishori Balal)

== See also ==
- List of Bollywood actors
