= Nammanna Don =

- Directed by: Ramesh Aravind
- Written by: DBC Shekar; Ramesh Aravind
- Produced by: Ravi Joshi
- Starring: Ramesh Aravind; Mona Parvaresh; Sunayana Suresh; Sanathini
- Cinematography: A. V. Krishna Kumar
- Edited by: P. R. Sounder Raj
- Music by: Mathews Manu (songs); Layendra (score)
- Distributed by: Lav Kush Productions
- Release date: 17 February 2012
- Running time: 2 hours 40 minutes
- Country: India
- Language: Kannada

Nammanna Don is a 2012 Indian Kannada comedy film starring Ramesh Aravind, Mona Parvaresh and Sanathini in the lead roles. Ramesh himself has directed and written the script with DBC Shekar for the movie. Mathew Manu is the music director of the film. Ramesh's brother-in-law, Ravi Joshi has produced the venture under Lava Kush Productions.

== Cast ==
- Ramesh Aravind as Dr. Arjun
- Mona Parvaresh as Malini
- Sanathini
- Raju Talikote as Muthu
- Rajendra Karanth
- Nitesh Nittur as Malpani
- Sunayana Suresh
- Veena Bhat
- Achyuth Kumar
- Layendra

== Soundtrack ==
Mathews Manu three songs for the soundtrack.

- "Ee Jeeva Ninagaagi" - Rajesh Krishnan
- "Bongu Bongu" - Jogi Sunitha
- "Jumbalaka Sakkath" - Mathews Manu

== Critical reception ==
Srikanth Srinivasa from Rediff.com scored the film at 3 out of 5 stars and says "Mathew who has also scored the music has done well. There's a flashmob sequence in a mall that has been picturised well while taking the shoppers by surprise. Nam Anna Don is a light-hearted movie. It will bring a smile on your face". A critic from Bangalore Mirror wrote "Nam Anna Don is better than most of the recent films of Ramesh. But it is not as good as Rama Shama Bhama that it is being compared to. It will not disappoint, but at the same time it is not a compulsive film". A critic from DNA wrote "One of the best things about the film is the complete absence of violence and being able to send a message through humour; yes, you can definitely take your family". A critic from News18 India wrote "Krishna Kumar's camera work is good, but he could have shot night sequences with more lights. Editor Soundar's work is crisp. 'Nammanna Don' is a fun-cum-message-oriented film which should not be missed".
