= Sathi Leelavathi (1995 film) =

Indian comedy film by Balu Mahendra

- Theatrical release poster
- Directed by: Balu Mahendra
- Written by: Crazy Mohan (dialogue)
- Screenplay by: Balu Mahendra
- Story by: Ananthu
- Produced by: Kamal Haasan
- Starring: Ramesh Aravind; Kalpana; Heera; Kovai Sarala; Kamal Haasan
- Cinematography: Balu Mahendra
- Edited by: Balu Mahendra
- Music by: Ilaiyaraaja
- Production company: Raaj Kamal Films International
- Release date: 15 January 1995
- Running time: 151 minutes
- Country: India
- Language: Tamil

Sathi Leelavathi (/səθi liːlɑːvəθi/ transl. Leelavathi, the chaste wife) is a 1995 Indian Tamil-language comedy film directed, co-written, photographed and edited by Balu Mahendra. The film stars Ramesh Aravind, Kalpana and Heera, with Kovai Sarala and Kamal Haasan in supporting roles. It revolves around Arun (Aravind) who, unhappy with his wife Leelavathi's (Kalpana) plain looks and weight, engages in an extramarital affair with Priya (Heera).

The film was produced by Haasan, with the story by Ananthu adapted loosely from the 1989 American film She-Devil and dialogues by Crazy Mohan. Ilaiyaraaja composed the music. Sathi Leelavathi was released on 15 January 1995 and became a commercial success. It was remade in Hindi as Biwi No.1 (1999) and in Kannada as Rama Shama Bhama (2005) with Aravind and Haasan reprising their roles.

== Plot ==
Arun is married to Leelavathi, arranged by their parents, and they have two children together. He is embarrassed by his wife's plain looks and weight. When he meets Priya, who works in a building construction company, he hides from her the fact that he is married, and they have an affair.

When Arun and Priya decide to go on vacation to Bangalore over a long weekend, Arun bumps into an old friend Sakthivel, an orthopaedic surgeon from Coimbatore, who is also going on holiday to Bangalore with his wife Palani and his son Anand. Sakthivel ends up travelling with Arun on the same flight and even staying in the same hotel. Throughout the trip, Arun tries to hide that Priya is with him, since Sakthivel knows that Arun is married to Leelavathi . Arun also has to ensure that Priya does not find out about his marriage. On their first night there, Sakthivel is called to Arun's room in the night as Arun has injured his back and the hotel doctor is unavailable. He bumps into Priya in the room and learns about their affair, but hesitantly keeps it under wraps from his own family on Arun's insistence.

After returning to Chennai, Priya finds out that Arun is married and even has children, but decides to stay with him when Arun says he was forced into this marriage and promises to divorce Leelavathi. When Leelavathi discovers Arun's affair through pictures Sakthivel's son Anand took of their holiday, she has a huge breakdown, leading to Arun moving out of their home and into Priya's flat. With the help of Sakthivel and Palani, and then Priya's old lover Raja, Leelavathi sends their children to stay with Arun and Priya, then her father-in-law and pet dog as well, making Priya hate Arun. Finally, Priya unites with Raja, apologising to him, and Leelavathi accepts a remorseful Arun.

== Cast ==
- Ramesh Aravind as Arunachalam "Arun"
- Kalpana as Leelavathi "Leela" aka "Gundus"
- Heera as Priyadarshini "Priya"
- Kovai Sarala as Palaniammal Sakthivel Gounder
- Chokkalinga Bhagavathar as Arun's father
- Raja as Raja (Guest appearance)
- Ra. Sankaran as Leela's father
- Veeraraghavan as Veeraraghavan
- Janaki as Leela's mother
- Madhan Bob as Rukmaangathan, Leelavathi's brother
- Krishnan as Hotel staff
- Vatsala Rajagopal as Ambujam Maami
- Lalitha as Bhagyalakshmi
- Master Anand as Sakthivel's son
- Baby Monisha as Ammulu
- Master Nadhim as Aravind
- Kamal Haasan as Dr. Sakthivel Gounder

== Production ==
The initial plot of Sathi Leelavathi revolved around two men fighting over a woman, with one of them being the antagonist. Raja, who had grown weary of being typecast in "soft" roles, readily accepted director Balu Mahendra's offer to portray the antagonist to break the stereotype, but deep into pre-production, Kamal Haasan felt this premise had been "done-to-death", and according to Raja, "From a bad guy, I became the extreme good guy". Jayaram was initially offered the lead role but his unavailability meant that the team finalised Ramesh Aravind. Haasan, who was supposed to appear only in four scenes, was attracted by the story and took on a larger role.

Rohini was Mahendra's choice for the role of Palani, although Haasan wanted Kovai Sarala. Mahendra objected, but Haasan remained adamant, and the director gave in. According to Sarala, post-release Mahendra was delighted that she was part of the film and that he felt bad for initially doubting her ability. Haasan speaks Kongu Tamil in the film, which he was said to have learned from Sarala. The film was loosely inspired by the 1989 American film She-Devil, but unlike that film, does not depict the female lead trying to establish her own identity at the cost of her husband's.

== Soundtrack ==
The music was composed by Ilaiyaraaja, with lyrics by Vaali. The song "Marugo Marugo" pays homage to the song of the same name from Vettri Vizhaa (1989).

Track listing
No.	Title	Singer(s)	Length
1.	"Ethana Vagai"	Chorus	4:30
2.	"Marugo Marugo"	Kamal Haasan, K. S. Chithra	6:10
3.	"Oru Thaaram"	Ben Surender	2:07
4.	"Maharajanodu"	P. Unnikrishnan, K. S. Chithra	5:19
5.	"Theme Music" (instrumental)	–	2:03
Total length:			21:09

== Release and reception ==
Sathi Leelavathi was released on 15 January 1995, the week of Pongal. R. P. R. of Kalki criticised the story's lack of originality, but lauded Mohan's dialogues and Haasan's humour-based performance. The film was a success, which Haasan attributed in large part to Sarala's comedy. She won the Tamil Nadu State Film Award for Best Comedian.

== Other versions ==
Sathi Leelavathi was dubbed in Telugu under the same title, with Haasan' voice dubbed by Mano instead of the usual S. P. Balasubrahmanyam. It was remade in Hindi as Biwi No.1 (1999), and in Kannada as Rama Shama Bhama (2005) with Aravind and Haasan reprising their roles.

== Bibliography ==
- Rajadhyaksha, Ashish; Willemen, Paul (1998) [1994]. Encyclopaedia of Indian Cinema. British Film Institute and Oxford University Press. ISBN 0-19-563579-5.
