= Vanishree =

Indian Kannada film, television actress

- Born: Karnataka, India
- Occupations: Actress (film; television)
- Children: 1

Vanishree or Vanishri is an Indian actress known for her work in Kannada cinema and television. Some of the notable films of Vanishree as an actress include Sparsha (2000), Nan Hendthi Chennagidale (2000), Gaalipata (2008), and Chowka (2017).

== Career ==
Vanishree has been part of more than ninety films and many Television serials and Shows in Kannada including Bigg Boss (Season 4).

== Selected filmography ==
- Nammoora Ramayana (1991)
- Elukoti Marthanda Bhairava (1991)
- Bharjari Gandu (1992)
- Ranjitha (1993)
- Om (1995)
- Thavarina Theru (1997)
- Hendithghelthini (1998)
- Hoomale (1998)
- Swasthik (1999)
- Shrirasthu Shubhamasthu (2000)
- Sparsha (2000)...Mangala
- Nan Hendthi Chennagidale (2000)...Sonia
- Mahalakshmi (2001)
- Meera Madhava Raghava (2007)
- Ganesha (2007)
- Beladingalagi Baa (2008)
- Gaalipata (2008)...Ganesh's sister
- Mussanjeya Gelathi (2009)
- Lodde (2015)
- Abhinethri (2015)
- Chowka (2017)
- Chakravarthy (2017)
- Tiger (2017)
- Chamak (2017)
- Orange...Dr. Sudha
- French Biriyani (2020) as Mahadev's wife

== Television ==
Year	Title	Role	Channel	Language	Notes
2016	Bigg Boss Kannada	Contestant	Colors Kannada	Kannada	Big Boss Kannada Season 4
2017-2018	Nandini	Madhavi	Sun TV	Tamil	Replaced by Rekha Krishnappa
2019	Premaloka		Star Suvarna	Kannada	
2020	Seetha Vallabha	Devaki	Colors Kannada	Kannada	

== See also ==
- List of people from Karnataka
- List of Indian film actresses
