= Ramesh Aravind =

Indian actor

- Born: 10 September 1964 (age 62); Kumbakonam, Tamil Nadu, India
- Education: University of Visvesvaraya College of Engineering, Bangalore
- Occupations: Actor, director, television presenter, screenwriter
- Years active: 1986–present
- Works: Full list
- Spouse: Archana
- Children: 2
- Website: ramesharavind.com

Ramesh Aravind (born 10 September 1964), known mononymously as Ramesh (in Kannada), is an Indian actor, director, screenwriter and television presenter, who predominantly works in Kannada and Tamil films in addition to a few Telugu, Hindi and Malayalam films. Widely known for his romantic dramas and comedy roles, Ramesh has appeared in over 140 films besides directing about 10 films in Kannada and Tamil. He has received numerous accolades including two Karnataka State Film Awards and two Filmfare Awards South, two Udaya Film Awards and Suvarna Film Awards.

Ramesh made his acting debut in Kannada with Sundara Swapnagalu (1986), in Tamil with Manathil Uruthi Vendum (1987) and in Telugu with Rudraveena (1988), all directed by K. Balachander. Throughout the 1990s, he has largely appeared in romantic drama in films such as Panchama Veda (1990), Keladi Kanmani (1990), Vasanthakala Paravai (1991), Belli Modagalu (1992), Duet (1994), Sathi Leelavathi (1995), Anuraga Sangama (1995), Karpoorada Gombe (1996), Nammoora Mandara Hoove (1996), Amruthavarshini (1997), America! America!! (1997), O Mallige (1997), Ulta Palta (1997), Mungarina Minchu (1997), Thutta Mutta (1998), Hoomale (1998), Sambhrama (1999) and Chandramukhi Pranasakhi (1999). In the 2000s, Ramesh returned to act performance oriented roles in films such as Kurigalu Saar Kurigalu (2001), Kothigalu Saar Kothigalu (2001), Apthamitra (2004), Varsha (2005), Pushpaka Vimana (2017) and Shivaji Surathkal (2020). Ramesh made his directorial debut with Rama Shama Bhama (2005) and since then he has directed over ten films both in Kannada and Tamil languages.

In addition to his acting career, Ramesh has worked as a writer on his films, hosted television programs and has been a prominent celebrity endorser for brands and products. His talk show Weekend with Ramesh, which has aired for five seasons on Zee Kannada gained huge popularity among audience. He also hosted Season 3 of Kannadada Kotyadhipati, the Kannada version of Who Wants to Be a Millionaire. Bruhat Bengaluru Mahanagara Palike (BBMP) appointed him as the awareness ambassador for COVID-19. He is the Brand Ambassador for 7 Wonders of Karnataka campaign jointly done by Suvarna News and Tourism Dept of Karnataka.

In 2022, Ramesh was awarded an honorary doctorate for his contribution to field of cinema by Rani Channamma University. Also in 2022, he was awarded the Dr. Shivarama Karanth Award for his services as an actor, director and resource person. In 2025, Ramesh was ranked as the 4th Top Motivational Speaker in India and 28th globally by Feedspot, a leading blog and information platform. This recognition highlights his influence and impact in the field of motivational speaking. In a moment of historic recognition, Austin mayor pro team Vanessa Fuentes presented an official Mayoral proclamation declaring 23 August, as "Dr Ramesh Aravind Day" in Austin, Texas.

On June 20th at the Prajavani Cine Sammana 2026, Dr Ramesh Aravind was conferred the honorary title "Kannadada Dhruva Thare" by Prajavani in recognition of his multifaceted contributions to Kannada culture, cinema, literature, and society.

== Early and personal life ==
Ramesh Aravind was born on 10 September 1964 into a Tamil Iyengar family in Kumbakonam, Tamil Nadu, India, to P. A. Govindachari and Saroja, who are originally from Tanjore district. He was raised primarily in Bangalore, Karnataka, where his family relocated for his fourth standard. He has three siblings including an elder sister. Growing up in an urban, middle‑class environment, Ramesh was exposed to both academic discipline and cultural activities, including theatre and local film culture, which later influenced his creative interests. As a school student, he was reportedly a high achiever, even securing a state rank of seventh in the Secondary School Leaving Certificate (SSLC) examination.

Ramesh attended institutions including Sri Kumaran Children’s Home (primary education) and later National High School, Basavanagudi. In 1987, he graduated with a Bachelor of Engineering (Mechanical Engineering) from the University Visvesvaraya College of Engineering (UVCE), Bangalore University.

He married Archana on 7th July 1991 and they have two children.

== Career ==
=== Acting ===
While studying at engineering college, Ramesh Aravind worked as an emcee at award functions, including an event celebrating the success of the film Sagara Sangamam (1983), where he met his long-term collaborator Kamal Haasan. He then started his television career hosting the show Parichaya on DD1-Kannada before working on a Kannada-language film titled Mouna Geethe, in which he had a supporting role. Prior to the release of the film, Ramesh was approached by director K. Balachander who had been casting the role of Kamal Haasan for a Kannada version of the Tamil film Sollathaan Ninaikkiren (1973). After a brief audition, Balachander selected Ramesh after being "impressed with his eyes" and cast him as the playboy character in Sundara Swapnagalu (1986), which released shortly before Mouna Geethe.

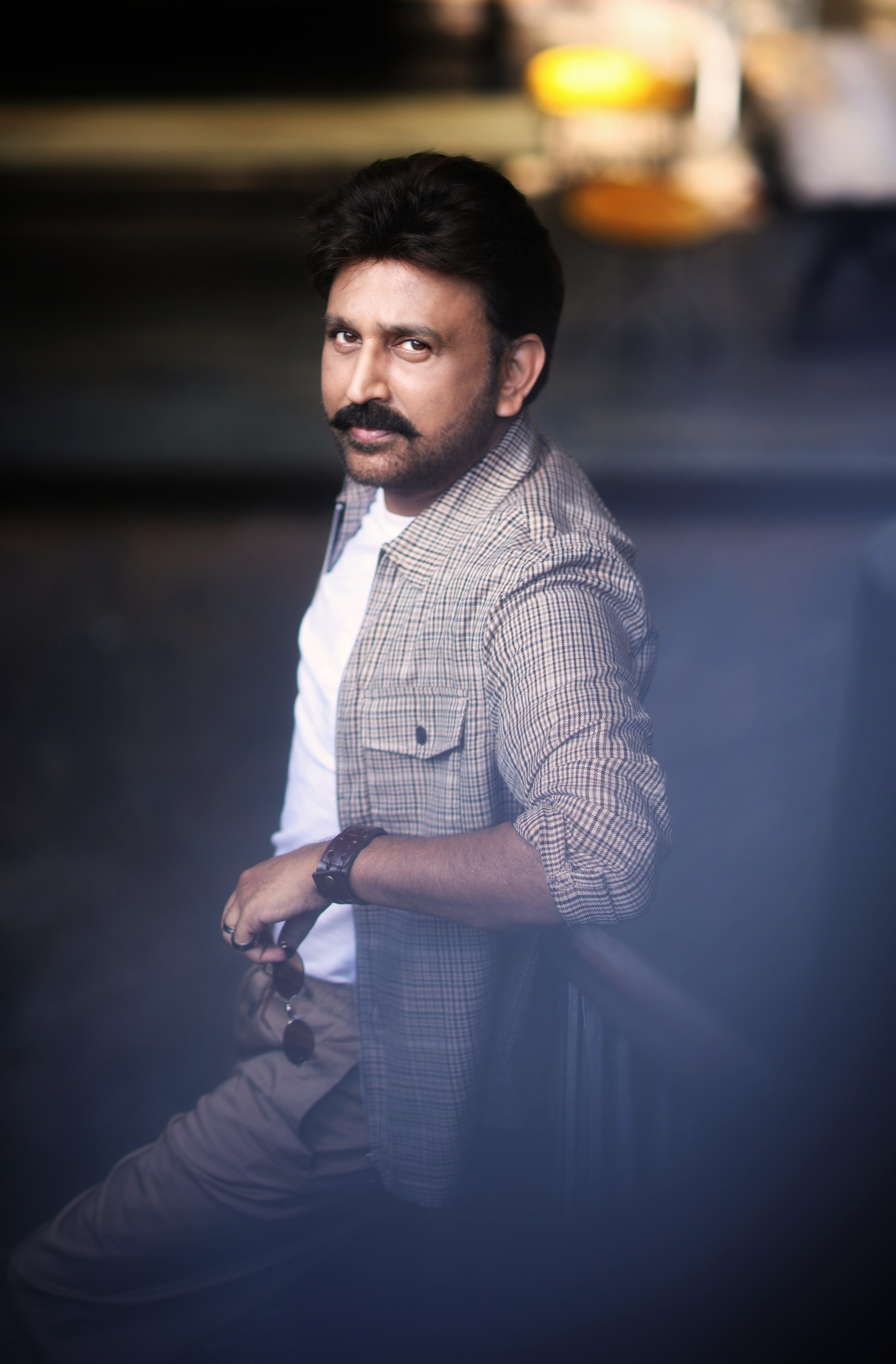
Ramesh at a promotional event for Shivaji Surathkal in 2020

Balachander then gave Ramesh a small role in Punnagai Mannan (1986) as Revathi's ex-lover but his scenes were edited out of the final version. Ramesh worked with the same director in the Tamil film Manathil Uruthi Vendum (1987) but Balachander later recommended to him to opt out of the film and work with K. Bhagyaraj instead to make his debut in a leading role. The proposed film was later shelved and Ramesh returned to the cast of Manathil Uruthi Vendum, winning critical acclaim for his performance. Balachander introduced Ramesh into Telugu films through Rudraveena, having been introduced into three film industries by the same director.

Ramesh made his breakthrough portraying a student union leader in Vasanth's romantic drama film Keladi Kanmani (1990), whose commercial success. He earned critical acclaim in Tamil cinema for his portrayal of a love-ridden musician in Balachander's Duet (1994) and for his performance alongside Kamal Haasan in Balu Mahendra's comedy film Sathi Leelavathi (1995). Subsequently, he returned to the Bangalore-based film industry to work in Kannada films. He appeared in several consecutive commercially successful Kannada films including Anuraga Sangama (1995), Karpoorada Gombe (1996), Nammoora Mandara Hoove (1996), Amruthavarshini (1997), America! America!! (1997), O Mallige (1997), Ulta Palta (1997), Mungarina Minchu (1997), Thutta Mutta (1998), Hoomale (1998), Sambhrama (1999) and Chandramukhi Pranasakhi (1999), becoming one of the industry's highest-paid actors.

Ramesh Aravind scripted the film Hoomale in 1998, leading to his career in film directing. Hoomale won him the Best Actor Filmfare Award and the Karnataka State Award. His script for Amruthadhare (2005) won him the Raghavendra Chitravani Award for Best Story.

In his return to Tamil films since the mid-1990s, Ramesh frequently collaborated with Kamal Haasan on projects including the unreleased Kanden Seethaiyai (1996), Panchathantiram (2002) and Mumbai Xpress (2005). His supporting role in Vasanth's Rhythm (2000) alongside Meena was appreciated.

=== Directing ===
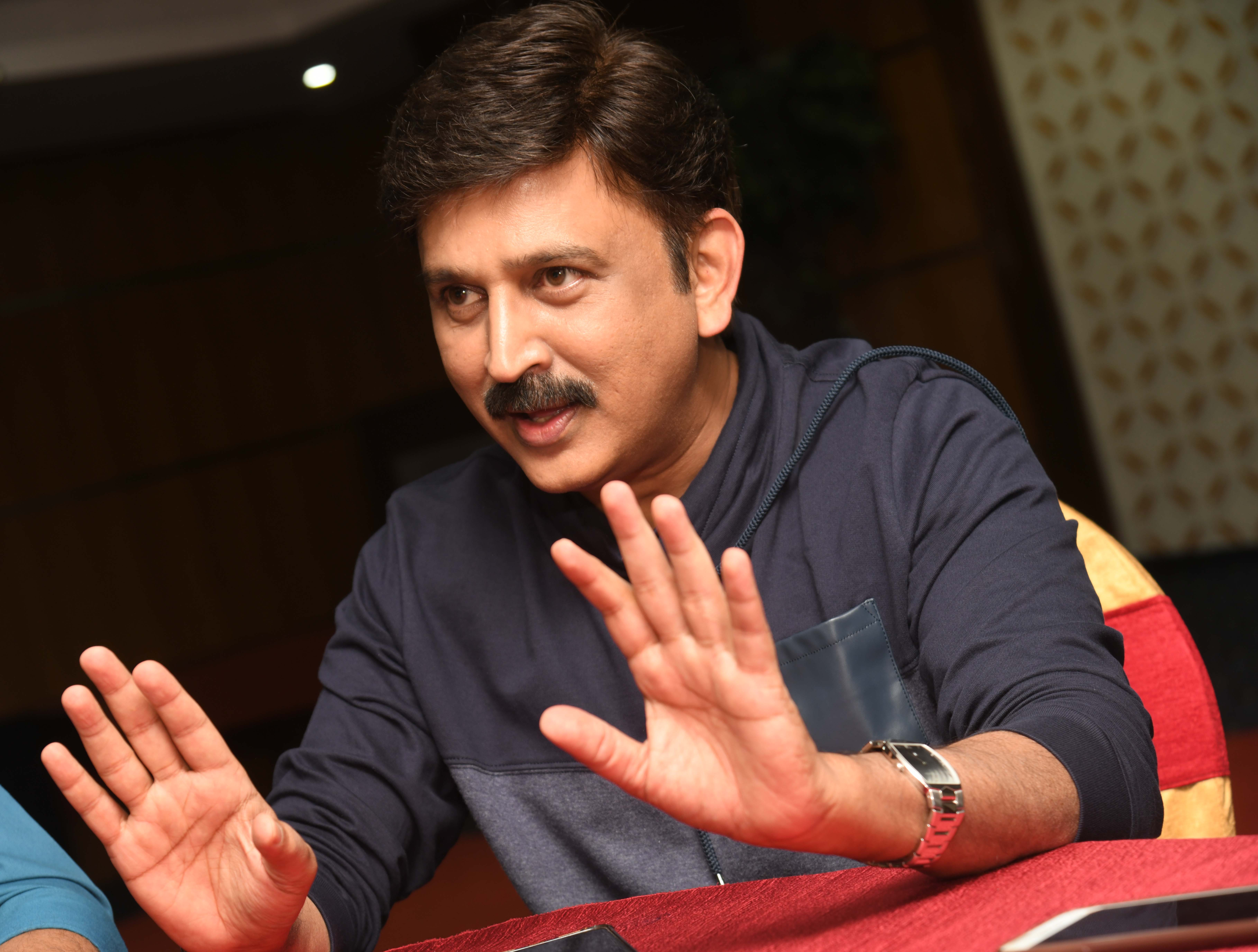
Ramesh in an interview

Ramesh Aravind's directorial debut was Rama Shama Bhama (2005) with Kamal Haasan. After this, he directed Sathyavan Savithri and Accident. In 2009, he directed the comedy film Venkata in Sankata and later Nammanna Don in 2012.

When Kamal Haasan asked Aravind to direct the Tamil-language film Uttama Villain (2015), Aravind accepted the offer. Uttama Villain is the first Aravind-directed film in which he did not portray a leading role; he said he accepted the film due to the "challenging nature of the script" and the opportunity to direct his mentor K. Balachander.

In 2016, Ramesh Aravind has stamped his own signature for his seventh directorial, Sundaranga Jaana, remake the original 2015 Telugu film, Bhale Bhale Magadivoy. In 2021, Ramesh as the protagonist and excels in his performance in the crime thriller film 100.

=== Writer ===
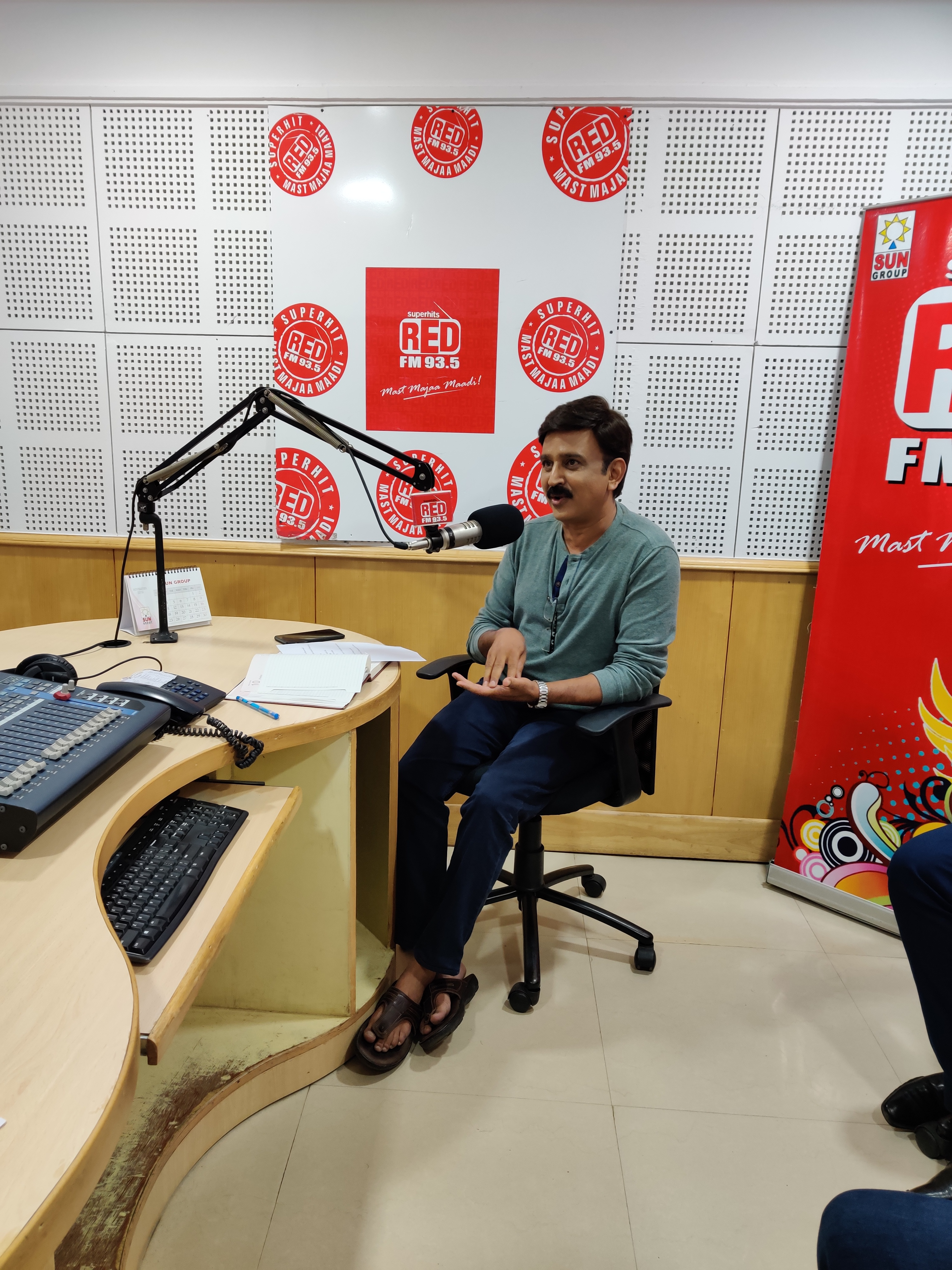
Ramesh in a talk show at RedFM 93.5 studios

His Kannada book "Art of Success" which is a collection of his quotes, became a bestseller. His recent book "Preetiyinda Ramesh" as highly successful with 5 editions in 5 months of release Aravind has written and narrated the Kannada audiobook "MasadaMaatu with Ramesh", which is available on Storytel.

Ramesh was also a celebrity talk-radio host on Big FM. His more recent notable appearance was in Shivaji Surathkal 2 which was released all over cinema theatres on 14 April 2023.

In 2024, his popular book & the Best Seller of 2022 - 23 "Preethyinda Ramesh" was translated to Tamil language as "Anbudan Ramesh".

=== Public speaking ===
Ramesh Aravind is also known for his work as a motivational speaker. A message in his voice was used as ringtone urging voters to vote in 2023 Assembly elections over Jio, Airtel platforms because of his noncontroversial and neutral image. He was chosen as Brand Ambassador for Bengaluru Gold Shopping Festival - Edition 2 in 2023.

=== Television ===
Ramesh Aravind has hosted the following shows: His show Weekend with Ramesh involves him inviting some of the prominent personalities from Karnataka to talk about their personal and professional lives. His show Weekend With Ramesh Season 5 is streaming on Zee Kannada. Dr. Ramesh Aravind turns as "Master-Mind" or Maha Guru for the show Mahanati (2024) telecasting every weekend in Zee Kannada channel. His inspirational speeches, and activities & other constant supporting abilities are appreciated by audience.

== Awards and accolades ==
Ramesh Aravind has won awards for his acting, directing and writing. He was awarded an honorary doctorate degree by Rani Channamma University for his contribution to cinema. In the year 2022, he was awarded the Dr. Shivarama Karanth Award for his work as an actor, director and resource person.

List of film awards and nominations received by Ramesh Aravind
Year	Film	Award	Category	Result	Ref.
1996–97	America America	Karnataka State Film Awards	Best Actor	Won	
1997	Amrutha Varshini	Filmfare Awards South	Best Actor – Kannada	Won	
1997	O Mallige	Udaya Film Awards	Best Actor	Won	
1997	America America; Amrutha Varshini	Screen Awards	Best Actor – Kannada	Won	
1998	Hoomale	Filmfare Awards South	Best Actor – Kannada	Won	
1998	Hoomale	Filmfans Association Award	Best Actor	Won	
1998–99	Hoomale	Karnataka State Film Awards	Best Actor	Won	
1999	Sambhrama	Filmfans Association Award	Best Actor	Won	
1999	Chandramukhi Pranasakhi	Cinema Express Awards	Best Actor	Won	
2001	Kothigalu Saar Kothigalu	Filmfare Awards South	Best Actor	Nominated	
2005	Amrithadhare	Raghavendra Prathishtana Awards	Best Story	Won	
2006	Rama Shama Bhama	Udaya Film Awards	Best Director Debut	Won	
2006	Rama Shama Bhama	Suvarna Film Awards	Best Actor (Hero in a comedy role)	Won	
2021	Shivaji Surathkal	Filmfare Awards South	Best Actor	Nominated	
2024	Shivaji Surathkal 2	5th Chandanavana Film Critics Academy Awards	Best Actor	Won	

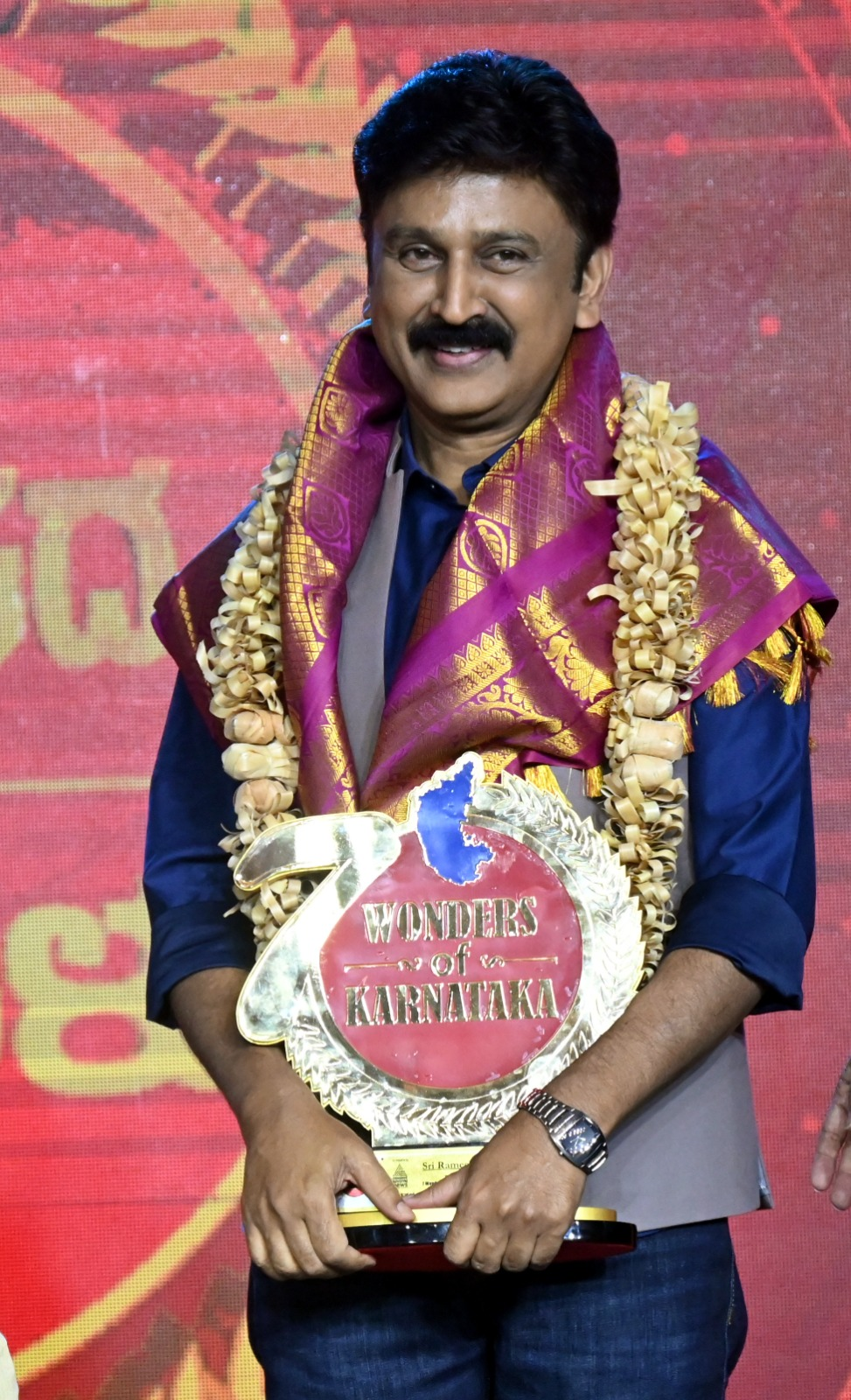
Ramesh as the ambassador of the 7 Wonders of Karnataka

List of accolades/appreciations received by Ramesh Aravind
Year	Award	Category	Awarded by	Ref.
2015	Zee Kutumba Awards	Pride of Zee Kannada (Weekend with Ramesh)	Zee Kannada	
2016	Zee Kutumba Awards	Pride of Zee Kannada (Weekend with Ramesh)	Zee Kannada	
2018	Zee Hemmeya Kannadiga	Proud Inspiration	Zee Kannada	
2018	Nadaprabhu Kempegowda Award	Contribution to Field of Arts	BBMP	
2022	Honorary Doctorate	In Contribution to Cinema Industry	Rani Channamma University, Belagavi	
2023	Dr. Shivarama Karanth Award	In contribution to Cinema & Society	Dr. Shivarama Karanth foundation	
2023	Kannada Kala Bhushana Award	Karunada Sambrama, Bengaluru		
2024	Mantralaya Parimala Prashasti 2024	In Contribution to Cinema Industry	Mantralaya Mutt & Space Media	
2024	Raghavendra Parimala Prashasti 2024	In Contribution to Cinema Industry	Parimala Geleyara Balaga	
2025	Mayoral proclaimation of "Dr Ramesh Aravind Day" on 23 August	In Contribution to Cinema & Society	Mayor, City of Austin	
2026	Kannadada Dhurvataare	In Contribution to Cinema, Literature & Society	Prajavaani, Kannada Newspaper at Prajavaani Kannada Cini Sanmana	
