= List of Kannada films of 2002 =

The following is a list of films produced in the Kannada film industry in India in 2002, presented in alphabetical order.

== Highest grossing films ==
Rank	Title	Collection	Ref.
1.	Appu	₹38 crore (₹161.33 crore in 2025)	
2.	Thavarige Baa Thangi	₹27 crore (₹114.62 crore in 2025)	
3.	Simhadriya Simha	₹19 crore (₹80.66 crore in 2025)	
4.	H2O	₹10 crore (₹42.45 crore in 2025)	
5.	Hollywood	₹6 crore (₹25.47 crore in 2025)	

== List of released films ==
Title	Director	Cast	Music	Notes
Artha	B. Suresha	Rangayana Raghu, Kiran Barkur, Megha Nadiger, Arundhathi Jathkar	Hamsalekha	
Aathma	Sushil Mokashi	Charan Raj, Kumar Govind, Sharan, Jhansi Subbayya, Varna	Prashanth Raj	
Annayya Thammayya	S. Umesh	Charan Raj, Shruti, Anu Prabhakar	Prashanth Raj	
Appu	Puri Jagannadh	Puneeth Rajkumar, Rakshita, Avinash, Ashok	Gurukiran	26 April release
Atithi	P. Sheshadri	Prakash Raj, H. G. Dattatreya, Lakshmi Chandrashekar	V. Manohar	9 August release
Bala Navika	Shivaji Rao Watker	Ramesh Bhat, Sneha, Bank Janardhan	Peter Selvaraj	
Balagalittu Olage Baa	Dinesh Babu	S. Narayan, Chaya Singh, Mukhyamantri Chandru, Ramesh Bhat, B. Jayashree	Hamsalekha	15 November release
Balarama	S. Mahendar	Rockline Venkatesh, Prema, Avinash, Doddanna, Tara	Hamsalekha	Remake of Telugu film Yerra Mandaram; 2 August release
Banallu Neene Buviyallu Neene	S. Narayan	S. Narayan, Shashikumar, Divya Unni, Rekha Das, Mukhyamantri Chandru	Prashanth Raj	Remake of Tamil film Veetla Visheshanga
Boothayyana Makkalu	G. K. Mudduraj	Sourav, Chaitra, Ananth Nag, Lokesh, Shruti, Darshan	Rajesh Ramanath	
Chandu	V. Arun Prasad	Sudeep, Sonia Agarwal, Srinath, Avinash, Chitra Shenoy, Lohithaswa	Gurukiran	10 May release
Chelvi	Dinesh Gandhi	B. C. Patil, Prema, Bhavana, Damini, Sunil Ghode	Hamsalekha	4 October release
Cheluve Ondu Heltheeni	Saigopal	Sourav, Chaitra, Karibasavaiah	Hamsalekha	Remake of Telugu film Swayamvaram
Commissioner Narasimha	G K Mudduraj	Charan Raj, Shwetha, Sridhar	Shivamaya	13 December release
Daddy No.1	Akash Babu	Charan Raj, Mohan Shankar, Vijayalakshmi, Tara	V. Manohar	
Dakota Express	M. S. Rajashekar	Om Prakash Rao, Amrutha, Rockline Venkatesh, Doddanna, Lokanath	Hamsalekha	Remake of Malayalam film Ee Parakkum Thalika; 11 April release
Devaru Varavanu Kotre	M. D. Sridhar	Vasu, Amrutha, Master Anand, Sharan	K. Kalyan	
Dharma Devathe	Nagendra Magadi	Devaraj, Shilpa, Jayanthi, Bank Janardhan	Upendra Kumar	11 January release
Dheera	Om Sai Prakash	Rockline Venkatesh, Sanghavi, Jayanthi, Mohan Shankar	Rajesh Ramanath	
Dhruva	M. S. Ramesh	Darshan, Sherin, Om Puri, Sadhu Kokila	Gurukiran	13 September release
Dhumm	M. S. Ramesh	Sudeep, Rakshita, Nassar, Srinath, Rangayana Raghu	Gurukiran	27 September release
Dil	P. N. Sathya	Vinod Prabhakar, Sridevi, Avinash, Darshan	M. N. Krupakar	
Dweepa	Girish Kasaravalli	Soundarya, Avinash, M. V. Vasudeva Rao, Harish Raj	Isaac Thomas Kottukapally	27 December release
Ekangi	V. Ravichandran	V. Ravichandran, Ramya Krishna, Prakash Raj, Vanitha Vasu, Sridhar	V. Ravichandran	28 March release
Friends	M. D. Sridhar	Sharan, Vasu, Master Anand, Ruthika	K. Kalyan	Remake of Telugu film 6 Teens
Galaate Maduve	B. Ramamurthy	Shashikumar, Deepthi, Tara, Sihi Kahi Chandru	N. Govindan	
H2O	Lokanath; Rajaram	Upendra, Prabhu Deva, Priyanka Trivedi, Babu Mohan, Bank Janardhan	Sadhu Kokila	29 March release
Hatthoora Odeya	B. C. Patil	B. C. Patil, Sanghavi, Damini, Karibasavaiah	K. Kalyan	30 August release
Hollywood	Dinesh Babu	Upendra, Felicity Mason, Ananth Nag	Gurukiran	6 December release
Jamindaru	S. Narayan	Vishnuvardhan, Prema, Raasi, Anu Prabhakar, Doddanna	M. M. Keeravani	3 April release
Joot	S. Govind	Saurav, Monika, Dhruv Sharma, Vanitha Vasu, B. V. Radha	Hamsalekha	13 September release
Kambalahalli	Senthil Nathan	Devaraj, Prema, Radhika Chaudhari, C P Yogeshwar, Balaraj	Hamsalekha	1 November release
Karmugilu	Venkatesh Prasad	Avinash, Tara, Ushakiran		
Kitty	G. K. Mudduraj	Darshan, Navya Natarajan, Bhavya, Avinash	Sadhu Kokila	29 November release
Kodanda Rama	V. Ravichandran	V. Ravichandran, Shivarajkumar, Sakshi Shivanand, Asha Saini, Mohan Shankar	V. Ravichandran	Remake of Malayalam film Thenkasipattanam; 17 May release
Kogile O Kogile	Vijay Venkatesh	Balaraj, Ramya, Srividya, Bank Janardhan	M N Krupakar	
Kullara Loka	Sharan Davangere	Vinod Alva, Niharika, Vasudev Shanbag	Abhimanyu	
Law and Order	Shivamani	Sai Kumar, Sharath Babu, Ashish Vidyarthi, Prathima Devi, Sadhu Kokila	Rajesh Ramanath	11 January release
Love Lavike	Kumar	Naveen Mayur, Chaithra (HP), Sara Shivakumar	K. Kalyan	Remake of Tamil film Parthen Rasithen
Love You	Shivamani	Shivamani, Chandini, Damini, Rami Reddy, Nirmal Pandey	Gurukiran	29 November release
Majestic	P. N. Sathya	Darshan, Sparsha Rekha, Jai Jagadish, Vanitha Vasu	Sadhu Kokila	8 February release
Makeup	Singeetham Srinivasa Rao	Jaggesh, Laila Patel, Shakti Kapoor, Komal Kumar, Mimicry Dayanand	John	8 November release
Manasella Neene	Mugur Sundar	Nagendra Prasad, Gayathri Raguram, Prabhu Deva, Karibasavaiah, M. Sundaram, Raju Sundaram, Ananth Nag	Ravi Raj	Remake of Telugu film Manasantha Nuvve; 21 June release
Manase O Manase	M. S. Rajashekar	Ramkumar, Shruti, Ananth Nag	V. Manohar	Remake of Telugu film Manasu Mamatha
Marma	Sunil Kumar Desai	Anand, Prema, Arun Sagar	Guna Singh	15 November release
Mutthu	H. Vasu	Ramesh Aravind, Ambareesh, Prema, Shruti, Kumar Govind	Rajesh Ramanath	Remake of Tamil film Kunguma Pottu Gounder; 21 February release
Naanu Naane	D. Rajendra Babu	Upendra, Sakshi Shivanand, Ananth Nag, Pavithra Lokesh, Sadhu Kokila	Deva	Remake of Hindi film Raja Hindustani; 11 October release
Nagarahavu	Murali Mohan	Upendra, Jyothika, Rockline Venkatesh, Sadhu Kokila	Hamsalekha	Remake of Hindi film Baazigar; 22 August release
Nammoora Yejamana	K. Venkatsamy	Charan Raj, Mohan Shankar, Shobhraj	Muthuraj	
Nandhi	D. Rajendra Babu	Sudeep, Sindhu Menon, Radhika Chaudhari, Ambika, Ashish Vidyarthi	Gurukiran	27 December release
Nata	Sudharshan	Tarakesh Patel, Rashmi, K. S. Ashwath	Gurukiran	Remake of Tamil film Priyamudan
Neela Megha Shyama	Raj Kishore	Srujan Lokesh, Radhika, Doddanna	Prashanth Raj	
Ninagagi	S. Mahendar	Vijay Raghavendra, Radhika, Tara, Ramakrishna	Gurukiran	Remake of Telugu film Nuvve Kavali
Ninagoskara	Yogesh Hunsur	Darshan, Ruchita Prasad, Naveen Mayur, Bhavna Pani	Chaitanya	27 September release
Ninne Preethisuve	Om Prakash Rao	Shivarajkumar, Ramesh Aravind, Raasi, Sharan, Lokesh	Rajesh Ramanath	Remake of Tamil film Nee Varuvai Ena; 9 August release
Olu Saar Bari Olu	Nagendra Magadi	Ramesh Aravind, Mohan Shankar, Anu Prabhakar, Ruchita Prasad, Balaraj	Rajdev	Remake of Marathi film Ashi Hi Banwa Banwi; 29 November release
Parva	Sunil Kumar Desai	Vishnuvardhan, Roja, Prema, Radharavi, Naveen Mayur	Hamsalekha	18 January release
Police Officers	Anand P. Raju	Thriller Manju, Charan Raj, Madan Mallu, Shailaja Somashekar	Shivamaya	3 May release
Preethi Mado Hudugarigella	B. C. Ranga	V. Ravichandran, Naveen Mayur, Rajani, Sripriya	Hamsalekha	8 February release
Prema	Suresh Raj	Prema, Vijaykumar, Lakshmi	K. Kalyan	25 October release
Prema Qaidi	Naganna	Vijay Raghavendra, Radhika Kumaraswamy, Doddanna, Sadhu Kokila	Prashanth Raj	Remake of Telugu film Prema Khaidi; 2 August release
Punjabi House	V. R. Bhaskar	Ramkumar, Vinod Alva, Damini, Shwetha	Rajan Ananth	Remake of Malayalam film Punjabi House
Putti	B. R. Keshav	Abhijeeth, Karibasavaiah, M. V. Vasudeva Rao, Deepa	Nagesh	
Roja	H. Vasu	Alankar, Urmila Shrivastav, Abhijeeth	Hamsalekha	15 November release
Romeo Juliet	Guna Kumar	Vijay Raghavendra, Radhika Kumaraswamy, Ritu Singh, Doddanna	Hamsalekha	11 October release
Saadhu	Thriller Manju	Thriller Manju, Sridevi, Rami Reddy	V. Manohar	20 September release
Sainika	Mahesh Sukhadhare	C P Yogeshwar, Sakshi Shivanand, Radhika Verma, Doddanna, Ashish Vidyarthi	Deva	14 June release
Simhadriya Simha	S. Narayan	Vishnuvardhan, Bhanupriya, Meena, Ruchita Prasad, Mukhyamantri Chandru, Ramesh Bhat, Abhijeeth, Umashree	Deva	Remake of Tamil film Nattamai; 7 June release
Sri Krishna Sandhana	Annayya	Venkatadri, Tara, Doddanna	V. Manohar	
Super Police	H S Rajashekar	Sai Kumar, Bhavana, Tennis Krishna		
Super Star	Nagathihalli Chandrashekar	Upendra, Keerthi Reddy, V. Manohar	Hamsalekha	21 June release
Surya IPS	B. C. Patil	B. C. Patil, Usha Kiran, Keerthi Raj	Sadhu Kokila	1 March release
Tapori	B. Suresha	Alankar, Anitha, Prema	Hamsalekha	
Thavarige Baa Thangi	Om Sai Prakash	Shivarajkumar, Radhika Kumaraswamy, Anu Prabhakar, Komal Kumar	Hamsalekha	1 November release
Thuntata	Indrajit Lankesh	Aniruddha Jatkar, Chaya Singh, Rekha Vedavyas, Umashree, Komal Kumar, Sudeep	Gurukiran	24 May release
Vamshakobba	Balaji Singh Babu	Jaggesh, Sujitha, Mani Chandana, Mukhyamantri Chandru	Sadhu Kokila	Remake of Tamil film Mallu Vetti Minor; 1 March release
