= Aata Hudugata =

Indian Kannada-language romantic thriller film

- VCD cover
- Directed by: B. Ramamurthy
- Written by: B. Ramamurthy
- Produced by: B. Sathyanarayana
- Starring: Raghavendra Rajkumar; Prema; Swathi
- Cinematography: Mahendra Chittibabu
- Edited by: Raghava
- Music by: Sadhu Kokila
- Production company: Sri Rajarajeshwari Films
- Distributed by: Gokul Films
- Release date: 4 July 1995
- Running time: 146 mins
- Country: India
- Language: Kannada

Aata Hudugata (transl. Child's play) is a 1995 Indian Kannada-language romantic thriller film written and directed by B. Ramamurthy. The film stars Raghavendra Rajkumar and Prema in the lead roles along with Swathi, Gangadhar, Shivaranjan, Aravind and Shivakumar in supporting roles. The music is composed by Sadhu Kokila. The film draws its plot as an inspiration from the Hindi film, Khiladi (1992).

== Plot summary ==
The plot revolves around Prema and Raj's efforts to unite their friends Anu and Vicky, who are facing opposition from their families. Things become complicated when Anuradha is mysteriously murdered.

== Cast ==
- Raghavendra Rajkumar as Raj
- Prema as Prema
- Shivaranjan as Inspector Sharath
- Swathi as Anuradha
- Gangadhar as Rajashekar
- Bank Janardhan as Mohan
- Rekha Das
- Michael Madhu
- Aravind
- Shivakumar
- Bheema Rao
- Anil Kumar
- Mohan Juneja
- Vidya
- Shilpa
- Sarojamma
- G. R. Ramadas

== Production ==
Aata Hudugata was actress Prema's second film to release in the same year after Savyasachi co-starring Shiva Rajkumar. Even though both the films were commercially unsuccessful, Prema's performance was noticed and she was signed on for her third film of the year 1995, Om which was a blockbuster success. Actor Gangadhar made his last screen appearance in this film before he died due to diabetes in 2003. This film marked the first notable role of Mohan Juneja.

== Soundtrack ==
Aata Hudugata

Film score by Sadhu Kokila
- Released: 1995
- Genre: Soundtrack
- Length: 19:34
- Producer: Sadhu Kokila

The film's music is composed by Sadhu Kokila and lyrics written by Sri Ranga.

S. No.	Song title	Lyrics	Singers	length
1	"Mutthu Ondu Mutthu"	Sri Ranga	Raghavendra Rajkumar	5:14
2	"Ullasada Ee Sanjege"	Sri Ranga	Raghavendra Rajkumar, Kusuma	4:32
3	"Aa Belli Chukki"	Sri Ranga	S. P. Balasubrahmanyam, K. S. Chithra	3:34
4	"O Premave Nee"	Sri Ranga	Rajesh Krishnan, K. S. Chithra	5.04
5	"Rukku Rukku Rukkumani"	Sri Ranga	Rajesh Krishnan	4.50
