= 1999–2000 Karnataka State Film Awards =

Annual Indian film awards ceremony

- Date: December 2001
- Location: Bengaluru
- Country: India
- Presented by: V. S. Ramadevi (Governor of Karnataka)

Highlights
- Most wins: • Deveeri • Kanooru Heggadithi • A.K.47 (3 Awards Each)

The 1999–2000 Karnataka State Film Awards, presented by Government of Karnataka, recognised the best of Kannada Cinema releases in the year 1999.

== Lifetime achievement award ==
Name of Award	Awardee(s)	Awarded As
• Dr. Rajkumar Award • Puttanna Kanagal Award • Lifetime Contribution to Kannada Cinema Award	• M. Leelavathi • V. Somashekar • S. P. Varadappa	• Actress, Supporting Actress • Director • Producer

== Jury ==
A committee headed by Jayamala was appointed to evaluate the feature films awards.

== Film awards ==
Name of Award	Film	Producer	Director
First Best Film	Deveeri	• Bharathi Gowda • Arathi Gadasali • Hanumantha Reddy • Kavitha Lankesh	Kavitha Lankesh
Second Best Film	Kanooru Heggadithi	• H. G. Narayan • I. P. Mallegowda • C. M. Narayan	Girish Karnad
Third Best Film	Chandramukhi Pranasakhi	Prakash Babu	Seetharam Karanth
Best Film Of Social Concern	Shabdavedhi	Parvathamma Rajkumar	S. Narayan

== Other awards ==
Name of Award	Film	Awardee(s)
Best Direction	Deveeri	Kavitha Lankesh
Best Actor	Hrudaya Hrudaya	Shiva Rajkumar
Best Actress	Kanooru Heggadithi	Tara
Best Supporting Actor	Shrirasthu Shubhamasthu	Srinivasa Murthy
Best Supporting Actress	Bannada Hejje	Vinaya Prasad
Best Child Actor	Deveeri	Manja
Best Music Direction	Chandramukhi Pranasakhi	K. Kalyan
Best Female Playback Singer	Arunodaya ("Aa Arunodaya Chanda")	Latha Hamsalekha
Best Male Playback Singer	Bannada Hejje ("Nagu Bandaroo Alu Bandaroo")	Rajesh Krishnan
Best Cinematography	Nannaseya Hoove	J. G. Krishna
Best Editing	A. K. 47	S. Manohar
Best Lyrics	Hagalu Vesha (All Songs)	Baraguru Ramachandrappa
Best Sound Recording	A. K. 47	Kodandapani
Best Art Direction	Kanooru Heggadithi	Shashidhar Adapa
Best Story Writer	Hagalu Vesha	Baraguru Ramachandrappa
Best Screenplay	Habba	D. Rajendra Babu
Best Dialogue Writer	Hrudaya Hrudaya	A. G. Sheshadri
Jury's Special Award	A. K. 47 (For Novel Techniques)	
