= Dr. Vishnuvardhan Award =

Regional Indian film award

- State award for contributions to Kannada cinema
- Awarded for: Contribution to Kannada Cinema.
- Sponsored by: Government of Karnataka
- Rewards: Gold Medal; ₹ 2,00,000
- First award: 1999–2000
- Final award: 2018
- Most recent winner: B. S. Basavaraju

Highlights
- Total awarded: 22
- First winner: S. P. Varadappa

The Dr. Vishnuvardhan Award, instituted in 2011 for the 2008–09 Karnataka State Film Awards is an award given by the government of Karnataka to long-serving film personalities in Kannada cinema. The award, previously called Lifetime Contribution to Kannada Cinema Award, was named Dr. Vishnuvardhan Award in honour of Kannada film industry actor Vishnuvardhan after his demise in 2009. The award carries a purse of ₹200,000 and a gold-plated plaque.

== Recipients ==
Year	Recipient	Notes	Ref
1999–2000	S. P. Varadappa	Film producer	
2000–01	T. S. Narasimhan	Film and TV series producer	
2001–02	Rajanand	Actor	
2002–03	S. K. Karim Khan	Lyricist	
2003–04	Kuppuswamy Naidu	Film producer	
2004–05	Vajramuni	Actor	
2004–05	Chandulal Jain	Film Producer	
2005–06	S. Ramachandra	Cinematographer	
2006–07	Dwarakish	Actor, film director, producer	
2007–08	Parvathamma Rajkumar	Film producer	
2008–09	A. R. Raju (Ajantha Raju)	Film producer	
2008–09	R. N. K. Prasad	Cinematographer	
2009–10	S. D. Ankalagi	Film producer; produced the first CinemaScope film in Kannada	
2010–11	Ambareesh	Actor	
2011	Anant Nag	Actor	
2012	Rajesh	Actor	
2013	K. V. Gupta	Film producer and distributor	
2014	Suresh Urs	Film editor	
2015	Rajan	Composer	
2016	K. Chinnappa	Poster artist	
2017	G. N. Lakshmipathy	Film producer	
2018	B. S. Basavaraju	Cinematographer	

== See also ==
- Karnataka State Film Awards
