= Nandi Awards of 1990 =

Indian Telugu film and TV awards ceremony

Nandi Awards presented annually by Government of Andhra Pradesh. First awarded in 1964.

== 1990 Nandi Awards Winners List ==
Category	Winner	Film
Best Feature Film	Mutyala Subbaiah	Yerra Mandaram
Second Best Feature Film	T. Kranthi kumar	Seetharamayya Gari Manavaralu
Third Best Feature Film	A Raghurami Reddy	Hrudayanjali
