= Picchalli Srinivas =

Indian singer, theatre activist

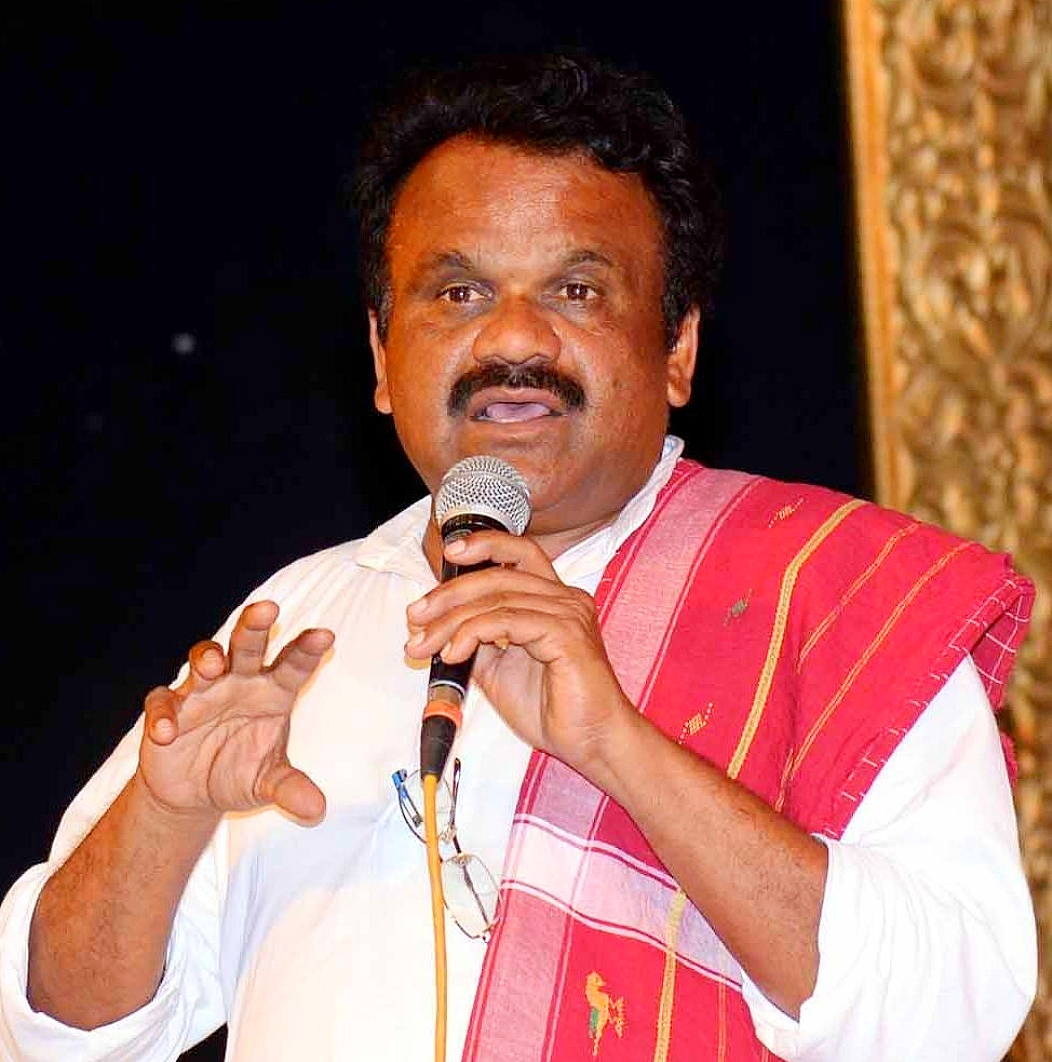
- Born: Picchalli, Bangarpet, Kolar, Karnataka, India
- Occupations: Singer; composer; performer; theatre activist
- Awards: Karnataka State Film Award for Best Male Playback Singer
- Musical career
- Genres: Filmi; Folk
- Instrument: Vocals
- Labels: Independent Artist

Picchalli Srinivas is an Indian singer, music director, theatre personality and activist, known for his works in Kannada. Apart from numerous folk songs, Srinivas has sung a few film songs. For his song "Dodda Gowdara" in the movie Amasa, he won the Karnataka State Film Award for Best Male Playback Singer in 2003-04. He also served as the President of Karnataka Janapada Akademi, the State's top institution for folk and performing arts.

== Career ==
Srinivas started his career as folk singer in plays along with acting in theatre. His folk songs were gained recognition for him. Songs like "Ee Nada Manninalli", "Entha Chandada Nagarahavu", "Yatakke Male Hodavo", "Kattutheva Navu" and are well received by the audience. Songs written by Siddalingaiah and Kotiganahalli Ramaiah are mostly rendered by Srinivas and became popular.

His film songs including "Dodda Gowdara" (Amasa), "Dharegene Dodda Vamsha" (Neela), "Elli Hodavo Kannige Kanadadavo" (Maathaad Maathaadu Mallige) are popular.

Srinivas served as the Chairperson of the Karnataka Jaanapada Akademi.

== Discography ==
Selected film songs recorded by Srinivas, are listed here.

- All songs are in Kannada

Year	Film	Song	Music	Co-singers
2001	Neela	"Dharegene Dodda Vamsha"	Vijaya Bhaskar	L. N. Shastry
2001	Neela	"Dharegene Dodda Vamsha"	Vijaya Bhaskar	solo
2003	Amasa	"Dodda Gowdara"	Picchalli Srinivas	solo
2009	Malebille	"Duddidre Duniya"	Manikanth Kadri	Hemanth, Mysore Jenny, Chintan Vikas
2009	Banada Neralu	"Thangali Alaru Marave"	Picchalli Srinivas	Solo
2009	Thaakath	"Alele Savari"	Gurukiran	solo
2010	Shabari	"Ee Bhumi Nammadu"	V. Manohar	solo
2010	Siddha Ganga	"Yaru Ninnavaralla"	Picchalli Srinivas	solo
2010	Siddha Ganga	"Yava Shapa Badiyitu"	Picchalli Srinivas	solo
2010	Siddha Ganga	"Chithe Illi Uridaithe"	Picchalli Srinivas	solo
2010	Siddha Ganga	"Beeso Gaaligu"	Picchalli Srinivas	solo
2012	Shiva	"Kollegaladalli"	Gurukiran	Malgudi Shubha
2013	Gandhi Jayanthi	"Sutthmuttha Hatthooralli"	H. Phalguna	solo
2013	Dasavala	"Nayi Banduddappa"	Gurukiran	solo

== Accolades ==
- Dr. B. R. Ambedkar Award by Karnataka Government
- 2003-04 – Karnataka State Film Award for Best Male Playback Singer for the song "Dodda Gowdara" from Amasa
- Janapada Akademi Award
- 2014 - President at the 10th Bangarpet Taluk Kannada Sahitya Sammelana
