= Neela (film) =

2001 film directed by T. S. Nagabharana

- Directed by: T. S. Nagabharana
- Written by: Kotiganahalli Ramayya
- Produced by: Ajay Kumar
- Starring: Gayatri Jayaraman
- Cinematography: G S Bhaskar
- Edited by: T Shashikumar
- Music by: Vijaya Bhaskar
- Release date: 28 September 2001
- Country: India
- Language: Kannada

Neela is a 2001 Indian Kannada-language drama film directed by T. S. Nagabharana and written by Kotiganahalli Ramaiah. Featuring Gayatri Jayaraman in the lead protagonist role, it also stars Shivadhwaj, Ananth Nag, Sarath Babu, Mayoori, Jayanthi and Naveen Mayur in key roles.

Neela was screened at the Indian Panorama international festival and won many accolades for the content. The film won the third best film at the Karnataka State Film Awards, and Gayatri Jayaraman won Best Actress at the Cinema Express Awards.

== Plot ==
The story is about a nomadic folk singer, Neela, who belongs to the "Neelagararu" tribe. She develops throat cancer and suddenly loses her voice. The story highlights her struggle to survive in her conservative society.

== Cast ==
- Gayatri Jayaraman as Neela
- Shivadhwaj as Sanjeeva
- Ananth Nag as Shivajja
- Sarath Babu as Palegar Jagadevaraya
- Jayanthi as Jagadevaraya's mother
- Rangayana Raghu as Siddayya, Neela's father
- Naveen Mayur as Karthik
- Enagi Nataraj as History professor
- Mayoori as Chandri, Jagadevaraya's daughter
- Picchalli Srinivas as mute person
- Apoorva Bargur as Geethanjali

== Soundtrack ==
Neela

Soundtrack album by Vijaya Bhaskar
- Genre: Feature film soundtrack
- Label: Anand Audio

The music was composed by the renowned composer Vijaya Bhaskar, his last work before his death. The soundtrack consisted of 12 tracks most of which were sung by acclaimed playback singer Vani Jairam.

Track listing
No.	Title	Lyrics	Singer(s)	Length
1.	"Aa Meru Ee Meru"	Kotiganahalli Ramaiah	Rajesh Krishnan, Vani Jairam
2.	"Kannannu Muchchabahudu"	Lakshmipathy Kolar	Vani Jairam
3.	"Chitthi Surimaleyanthe"	Lakshmipathy Kolar	Badri Prasad
4.	"Yedeyaaga Yekathiri"	Lakshmipathy Kolar	Hemanth Kumar, Vani Jairam
5.	"Dharegene Dodda Vamsha"	Lakshmipathy Kolar	L. N. Shastri, Picchalli Srinivas
6.	"There There Ninna Daari"	Lakshmipathy Kolar	Badri Prasad
7.	"Kotta Daniya Kottanthe"	Lakshmipathy Kolar	Vani Jairam
8.	"Ee Naada Manninalli"	Lakshmipathy Kolar	Vasundhara Das
9.	"Dho Dho Surimaleyanu"	Kotiganahalli Ramayya	Vani Jairam, M. D. Pallavi Arun, L. N. Shastri
10.	"Kannanu Muchhabahudu"	Lakshmipathy Kolar	Vani Jairam, Badri Prasad
11.	"Hejje Hejje Mathaadu"	Kotiganahalli Ramayya	Vasundhara Das
12.	"Dharegene Dodda Vamsha"	Lakshmipathy Kolar	Picchalli Srinivas

== Reception ==
A critic from indiainfo wrote that "Overall if you have lots of time to spare and want to catch a movie, Neela might just be it!"
