= Nammoora Mandara Hoove =

1996 Kannada film by Sunilkumar Desai

- Promotional poster
- Directed by: Sunil Kumar Desai
- Written by: Sunil Kumar Desai
- Produced by: Jayashri Dev
- Starring: Shiva Rajkumar; Ramesh Aravind; Prema
- Cinematography: Sundarnath Suvarna
- Edited by: R. Janardhan
- Music by: Ilayaraja
- Production company: Chinni Films
- Distributed by: Yash Raj Films
- Release date: 5 August 1996
- Running time: 168 minutes
- Country: India
- Language: Kannada

Nammoora Mandara Hoove (transl. The flower grown in our town) is a 1996 Indian Kannada-language film directed by Sunil Kumar Desai starring Shiva Rajkumar, Ramesh Aravind and Prema in lead roles. It's considered one of the all-time blockbuster romantic movies in the Kannada film industry.

The film was also a milestone movie in the career of its lead actors Shiva Rajkumar, Ramesh Aravind and Prema. It was a huge success at the box-office. The music composition by Ilaiyaraaja was received with much accolades with the songs continuing to frequently play in the air waves. Following a 22-week run in Bangalore, it was screened in a few screens in the United States. The film was remade in Tamil as Kangalin Vaarthaigal with Prema reprising her role and all songs retained in that version.

== Plot ==
Manoj (Shiva Rajkumar) is a documentary project director, whose father is a singer and music composer. He tells his producer (Avinash) that he plans to visit different locations for his forthcoming projects. He decides to go to Karwar, which is 322 miles northwest of Bangalore, in the Uttara Kannada district of Karnataka. He then plans to stay with Praveen (Ramesh), a close friend, who lives in nearby Yellapur, in order to see the location, and to shoot the location on video. Praveen says that Pramod Hegde is the best person to guide him.

Next day, Manoj goes for a walk by the beautiful Satoddi Waterfalls, where he hears a girl with a beautiful voice. He films her, but when she sees him, she runs off. Then he meets a young lad, Deepu (Master Vinayak Joshi), to whom he shows the girl he has filmed in his video camera and asks him who she is. He tells her that she is his sister, Suma (Prema). Manoj is intrigued by the girl, and the sound of her voice. He gradually falls in love with her. He meets Shivram Dixit, her singing teacher, and Praveen's friend, Pramod who is to be his guide. Then Praveen introduces him to Suma, and they look at each other, with love in their eyes.

There is a cry, Deepu has fallen into the well. Everyone runs to the well, and Manoj and Pramod jump in to save him. Manoj gives him artificial respiration, and everyone is relieved when he finally breathes again. Suma signals her gratitude to Manoj. They decide to go on a picnic to Yana, a place famous for two massive black, crystalline limestone rock outcrops, the Bhairaveshwara Shikhara and the smaller Mohini Shikhara. They take Suma, Praveen, Sudha (Praveen's sister), Pramod and Maruthi (Praveen's servant). Manoj tells Suma that he loves her, and Suma begins to gradually fall in love with Manoj. Another girl, Jaji, arrives on the scene. Maruthi (to whom her father had promised her in marriage) had told her father that he had seen her out with Mahadev, whom she says she loves. Her back is bruised, where her father had beaten her because of what Maruthi had told him.

Manoj tells Praveen that Suma could become a very famous singer. He says he will make a recording of her voice and send it to his father. Praveen is delighted, and so is Suma. He also sends a video cassette of her to his mother and later tells her that she is the girl he wants to marry. However, Praveen starts to behave differently. Sudha, his sister realises that Praveen has loved Suma for a long time but has never told her of his love for her, and Sudha tells him that she is going to tell Manoj, but Praveen makes her promise not to tell anybody. Manoj overhears this conversation and decides to sacrifice his love for Praveen, but Praveen also decides to sacrifice his love for Manoj. Suma realizes all this and confesses everything. The film ends with Manoj marrying Suma and Suma receiving an award.

== Cast ==
- Shiva Rajkumar as Manoj
- Ramesh Arvind as Praveen Bhat
- Prema as Suma
- Suman Nagarkar as Sudha, Praveen's sister
- Renukamma Murugodu as Kamalamma, Suma's grandmother
- Sanketh Kashi as Maruthi
- Sudhakar Bannanje as Tabla Player
- Praveen Rao as Pramod Hegde, Relative of Praveen bhat
- Kavana as Jaaji
- Bharath Bhagavathar
- Kamanidharan as Praveen's Mother
- Ramesh Bhat as Shivarama Dixit, Music Teacher
- Master Vinayak Joshi as Deepu, Suma's brother
- Kishori Ballal as Manoj's mother
- Sripathi Ballal as Manoj's father
- Avinash in a cameo appearance

== Production ==
After making thrillers, Nammoora Mandara Hoove was Desai's first film in romantic genre. The film saw Shivarajkumar and Prema uniting for second time after Om (1995). The film was entirely shot at Yana, Yellapura, Yekkambi, Sirsi and Banavasi in Uttara Kannada district of Karnataka. The song "Hele Kogile" was shot at Sathodi Falls. Vinayak Joshi made his acting debut as child artist with this film. A red Maruti Suzuki Gypsy was used in the film.

== Soundtrack ==
Nammoora Mandara Hoove
- Soundtrack cover

Soundtrack album by Ilayaraja
- Released: 26 December 1995
- Genre: Feature film soundtrack
- Length: 34:18
- Label: Lahari Music

Ilaiyaraaja composed the background score for the film and the soundtracks. The lyrics for the soundtracks were penned by K. Kalyan, V. Manohar, S.M.Patil and Doddarange Gowda. The album consists of seven soundtracks. The album was well received and is considered a major contributor in the film's success. All the songs were retained in the Tamil remake version. About the song, "Muthu Muthu Neera", Deepa Ganesh of The Hindu wrote "the folksy chorus, the melody tossing between highs and lows, and the summing up percussion patterns. The highlight is the solo flute which lands on a high from where the chorus soars." According to Krishna Prakasha Ulithaya, the song "Omkaradi Kande" was one of the Kannada songs for effectively using the silence.

| No. | Title | Lyrics | Singer(s) | Length |
|---|---|---|---|---|
| 1. | "Halli Laavaniyali Laali" | K. Kalyan | S. P. Balasubrahmanyam, K. M. Kusuma | 4:41 |
| 2. | "Hele Kogile" | K. Kalyan | Chithra | 4:59 |
| 3. | "Omkaaradi (Female Version)" | S. M. Patil | Chithra | 4:55 |
| 4. | "Mutthu Mutthu Neera Haniya" | K. Kalyan | S. P. Balasubrahmanyam, Chithra | 5:09 |
| 5. | "Dheem Thakita" | V. Manohar | S. P. Balasubrahmanyam | 4:36 |
| 6. | "Manadaase Hakkiyaagi" | Doddarangegowda | S. P. Balasubrahmanyam, Manjula Gururaj | 5:03 |
| 7. | "Omkaaradi (Duet)" | V.Manohar | Ilaiyaraaja, Chithra | 4:55 |
| 8. | "Ga ga ri ri ga (Aalaapa)" | - | Rathnamala Prakash | 00:30 |
| Total length: | | | | 34:48 |

== Awards ==
1996–97, Karnataka State Film Awards

- Best Child Actor – Male for Master Vinayak Joshi
- Best Female Playback Singer for K. S. Chithra.

== Legacy ==
The filming locations Yana and Sathodi Falls falls attained popularity and became tourist spots after the film's release.
