= Kangalin Vaarthaigal =

- VCD cover
- Directed by: Muktha S. Sundar
- Written by: Sunil Kumar Desai; Crazy Mohan
- Produced by: Muktha S Ravi; Muktha Srinivasan
- Starring: Vikram; Sriram; Prema; Karan
- Cinematography: C. H. Rajkumar
- Edited by: K. Sampath
- Music by: Ilaiyaraaja
- Production company: Muktha Films
- Release date: 6 March 1998
- Running time: 171 minutes
- Country: India
- Language: Tamil

Kangalin Vaarthaigal (transl. Words from the eyes) is a 1998 Indian Tamil-language film directed by Muktha S. Sundar. The film stars Vikram, newcomer Sriram, Prema and Karan. It is a remake of the 1996 Kannada film Nammoora Mandara Hoove. The film was released on 6 March 1998.

== Cast ==
- Vikram as Chandru
- Sriram as Madhan
- Prema as Janaki
- Jeeva as Kausalya
- Karan as Chandru's uncle
- R. Sundarrajan
- Kunnakudi Vaidyanathan
- Kaka Radhakrishnan
- Loose Mohan
- Pandu
- Jagan
- Rukmini

== Production ==
The film marked Muktha Srinivasan's 50th year in the film industry. Though Vikram's big budget film, Ullaasam (1997), became a box office failure, the producers still offered him the chance to star in a multistarrer project since they felt that he could not carry a film on his own. Newcomer Sriram, who was a medical student, was subsequently added to the cast.

== Soundtrack ==
Music was composed by Ilaiyaraaja. All the songs from the Kannada film were retained, which had also been composed by Ilaiyaraaja.

Song	Singers	Lyrics
"Alli Sundaravalli"	Arunmozhi, Harini	Palani Bharathi
"En Idhayam"	P. Unnikrishnan	Ilandevan
"Indha Kadhal"	Bhavatharini, P. Unnikrishnan	Muthulingam
"Muthu Muthu"	Harini, Mano	Palani Bharathi
"Nenjathin Geethame"	Bhavatharini	Ilandevan
"Sree Ramane"	K. S. Chithra, Ilaiyaraaja	Ilandevan

== Reception ==
D. S. Ramanujam from The Hindu wrote, "the concluding portions where the three meet in a clash of emotions, the boys being beaten by a level- headed girl, requires some more depth in handling."
