= Muktha S. Sundar =

Indian film director and cinematographer

- Other name: Srinivasan Sundar
- Occupation: Director
- Years active: 1986–present
- Parent: Muktha Srinivasan (father)

Muktha S. Sundar is an Indian film director and cinematographer who has worked on Tamil language films.

== Career ==
Being the son of film director and producer Muktha Srinivasan, Sundar made his directorial debut under his father's production with Kodai Mazhai (1986). Sundar had completed a course in cinematography at the American Film Institute and worked as the cinematographer for films including his father's productions Katha Nayagan (1988), Vaai Kozhuppu (1989) and Brahmachari (1992). He subsequently also directed the films Chinna Chinna Aasaigal (1989), Ethir Kaatru (1990) and Kangalin Vaarthaigal (1998) with Vikram in the lead role.

Sundar made a comeback to the film industry with the comedy thriller, Pathayeram Kodi (2013), featuring Dhruv Bhandari and Vivek in leading roles. The film began production in late 2011 and had a low-profile release in January 2013.

Sundar later announced a film based on Vedanta Desika 2016 featuring Dushyanth Sridhar, which was dropped.

== Filmography ==
Year	Film	Notes
1986	Kodai Mazhai	
1989	Chinna Chinna Aasaigal	Also cinematographer
1990	Ethir Kaatru	Also cinematographer
1998	Kangalin Vaarthaigal	
2013	Pathayeram Kodi	
2018	Vedanta Desika	Sanskrit film (Manipravalam language)
