= Naalo Unna Prema =

2001 film by V. R. Pratap

- DVD cover
- Directed by: V.R Pratap
- Written by: Diwakar Babu (dialogues)
- Screenplay by: V.R Pratap
- Story by: Seetaram Karanth
- Produced by: K.L.N. Raju
- Starring: Jagapati Babu; Laya; Gajala
- Cinematography: Ajay Vincent
- Edited by: Nandamuri Hari
- Music by: Koti
- Production company: Sri Sairam Productions
- Release date: 1 September 2001
- Running time: 139 minutes
- Country: India
- Language: Telugu

Naalo Unna Prema (transl. The Love Inside Me) is a 2001 Telugu-language romantic drama film, produced by K.L.N. Raju on Sri Sairam Productions banner and directed by V. R. Pratap. The film stars Jagapati Babu, Laya, Gajala and music was composed by Koti. This film is the debut of Gajala in Telugu and she is credited as Raaji by her character name in the film later her screen name was changed to Gajala from the film Student No.1 by K. Raghavendra Rao. The film was a remake of Kannada film Chandramukhi Pranasakhi (1999).

== Plot ==
The film begins in Hyderabad, where a businessman, Sai Krishna, is a fan of famous singer Hema from Vizag. Once, he visits his friend's wedding and encounters an impish girl, Raaji, who has known no bounds for her devilishness. She pokes fun at Sai Krishna, and he smartly pays back. So, ired Raaji seeks vengeance. Meanwhile, Hema's musical night is conducted on the eve of the nuptial when Sai Krishna is on cloud nine and falls for her. Moreover, he learns that Hema and Raaji are siblings. Soon after the return, Sai Krishna writes a letter to Hema. Fortuitously, Raaji picks it up, and she starts her horseplay. Now, she poses as Hema by writing letters and having telephone conversations. After some time, Raaji officially traveled to Hyderabad. Therein, Sai Krishna cares for her meticulously in favor of Hema. Perceiving it, Raaji inadvertently starts loving him.

After homecoming, Raaji attempts to reveal reality, but she hesitates. Simultaneously, Sai Krishna's dearness to Hema escalates. He bestows a locket containing his and Hema's photos, which Raaji starts wearing and feels for herself. Concurrently, Sai Krishna organizes Hema's program in his town. At the concert, Hema aspires to wear the locket undisclosed, and Raaji is unwilling to hand it over. But Raaji is distraught at what would happen when Sai Krishna and Hema come across each other. Hence, she divulges the fact to Sai Krishna through a letter. However, before it arrives, he moves on. Immediately after the concert, Sai Krishna tries to speak to Hema. Anyhow, she opines him as a mischief-maker and mortifies him. Thus, enraged Sai Krishna slaps Hema and shows the locket as evidence of their love.

At the sight of it, Hema turbulently reaches home and assaults Raaji. Besides, Sai Krishna is inflamed and distressed. During that predicament, the elders thought it was worth speaking with each other, so they knit Sai Krishna & Hema. Sai Krishna accepts it, provided Raaji should apologize to him. So, he proceeds to their house, where he converses with Hema and Raaji. Herein, Sai Krishna proclaims he does not have the heart to espouse Hema because Raaji reciprocates his feelings. Plus, he knows Raaji's true love with her last forgiveness letter. At last, Sai Krishna heartfully proposes to Raaji, and she blissfully agrees. The movie ends on a happy note with the marriage of Sai Krishna & Raaji.

== Cast ==
- Jagapati Babu as Sai Krishna
- Laya as Hema
- Gajala as Raji
- Ranganath as Sai's father
- Giri Babu as Hema's father
- M. S. Narayana as Tabelu Vamana Rao
- L. B. Sriram as Bose
- Annapurna as Sai's mother
- Kovai Sarala as Sarala
- Indu Anand
- Ram Jagan
- Ananth
- Visweswara Rao

== Soundtrack ==
Music was composed by Koti. The song "Manasa O Manasa" is based on "Manase O Manase" from Kannada film Chandramukhi Pranasakhi.

No.	Title	Lyrics	Singer(s)	Length
1.	"Veeche Chirugaali"	Sirivennela Sitarama Sastry	SP Charan	4:48
2.	"O Naa Priyathama"	Sirivennela Sitarama Sastry	Mano, Chitra	4:35
3.	"Enno Enno"	Sirivennela Sitarama Sastry	Hariharan, Sujatha	4:16
4.	"Edalo Okate Korika"	Potula Ravikiran	Tippu, Sujatha	4:19
5.	"Gopala Krishnudamma"	Sirivennela Sitarama Sastry	S. P. Balasubrahmanyam, Chitra	4:46
6.	"Manasa O Manasa"	Sriharsha	Chitra	5:05
7.	"Veeche Chirugaali" (female)	Sirivennela Sitarama Sastry	Chitra	4:48
Total length:				32:07

== Reception ==
Idlebrain wrote "First half of the film is OK. Second half of the film is predictable. This film is a run-of-the-mill stuff offering no variety". Full Hyderabad wrote "The plot, like you'd have made out, will not give Wodehouse any complex, and the performances are average. Raji has the meatiest role, and is the poorest performer. Her dialogues on the seaside that were intended to take the film to a plane of profundity make your stomach churn. But for her pretty looks, there is nothing you can say for her. Laya is just a glorified extra. And Jagapathi Babu is his usual self - you should be very clear about what you should expect from him". Andhra Today wrote "The story, though lacks in novelty, has many scenes conceived quite differently. This variety in conception has not been exploited to his advantage by the director due to his own shortcomings. The movie's pace is too slow to hold the audience's interest. Even the scenes with potential have not been dealt with suitably by the director".
