= Omkaram =

1997 Telugu film by Upendra

- Theatrical release poster
- Directed by: Upendra
- Written by: Upendra; L. B. Sriram (dialogues)
- Screenplay by: Upendra
- Story by: Upendra
- Based on: Om (1995)
- Produced by: KKN Kumari
- Starring: Dr. Rajasekhar; Prema
- Cinematography: Sundarnath Suvarna
- Edited by: R. Janardhan
- Music by: Hamsalekha
- Release date: 6 February 1997
- Running time: 158 minutes
- Country: India
- Language: Telugu

Omkaram is a 1997 Indian Telugu-language action drama film directed by Upendra making his directorial debut in Telugu. The film stars Dr. Rajasekhar, Prema and Bhagyashree. The film was a remake of director's own 1995 Kannada film Om with Prema reprising her role in the remake. The Telugu version was an average success.

== Cast ==
- Dr. Rajasekhar as Satya
- Prema as Madhuri "Madhu"
- Bhagyashree as Sasi
- J. V. Somayajulu as Satya's father
- Kote Prabhakar
- Upendra as the narrator of the first scene
- Subbaraya Sharma
- Ananth

== Soundtrack ==
The soundtrack was composed by Hamsalekha who also composed the songs for the original Kannada version . He retained three songs from the original while the fourth one was from one of his earlier Kannada movie.

The film retained three songs from the original film while the song "Om Brahmanda", which comes in the place of "Hey Dinakara" retained only the opening Sanskrit verse from the original version and was followed by the tune of another Kannada song by Hamsalekha - "Eke Heegaytho" from the 1988 Kannada movie Anjada Gandu.

Telugu version

- "College Kurrodu" - Mano
- "O Gulabi" - S. P. Balasubrahmanyam
- "Bullemma" - Mano
- "Dilruba" - S. P. Balasubrahmanyam
- "Om Brahmanda" - S. P. Balasubrahmanyam

Tamil version

- "College Student" - Mano
- "O Rojave" - S. P. Balasubrahmanyam
- "Kanne Vaa" - Devi
- "Om Brahmananda" - S. P. Balasubrahmanyam
- "I Love You" - S. P. Balasubrahmanyam
