= Prema (Kannada actress) =

Indian actress

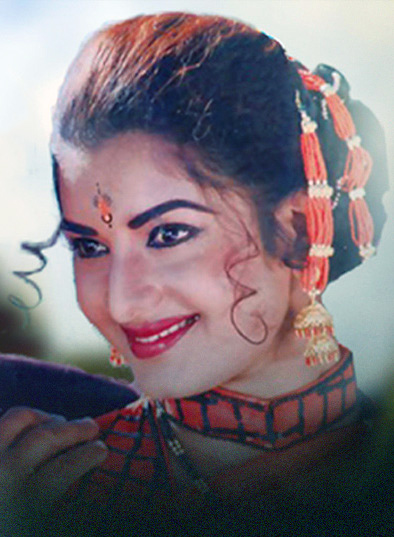
- Prema in Ellaranthalla Nanna Ganda film
- Born: Neravanda Chetticha Prema; Bangalore, Karnataka, India
- Occupation: Actress
- Years active: 1994–2009; 2017–present
- Relatives: Neravanda Aiyappa (brother)

Neravanda Chetticha Prema is an Indian actress known for her work predominantly in Kannada, Telugu, Malayalam, and a few Tamil language films. She ruled Kannada industry in the 90s and early 2000s and she has appeared in many commercially successful feature films. She was a leading Kannada actress at the turn of the century and has received the Karnataka State Film Award and Filmfare Best Actress awards for her performances in Kannada films. She has featured in Om and Yajamana, which are the two major blockbuster and highest-grossing films of their time in Kannada cinema. After an eight-year hiatus, she returned to films with Upendra Matte Baa in 2017.

== Personal life ==
Prema was born into Neravanda family, of the Kodava community to Chetticha and Kaveri, in military hospital, Bangalore. She received high school education in Mahila Seva Samaja High School and completed her Pre-university course in Murnad junior college, Kodagu. As a student she was involved actively in sports and represented her school and college in high jump and volleyball events at the national level. Her younger brother Neravanda Aiyappa was a cricket player who represented Karnataka in Ranji Trophy. Her younger sister Indu NC lives in Dubai.

Prema was married to Jeevan Appacchu. She filed a divorce petition in the Family Court, Bangalore in March 2016.

== Career ==
Prema began her career in the Rajkumar camp in 1995 starring opposite Shivarajkumar in Savyasachi and Raghavendra Rajkumar with Aata Hudugata respectively. Though both films did not perform well at the box-office, she was given the lead role in another Shivarajkumar starrer Om directed by Upendra. The film turned out to be a blockbuster and also got her the Karnataka State Award for Best Actress.

In 1996 she acted in the Sunil Kumar Desai directed Nammoora Mandara Hoove co-starring Shivarajkumar and Ramesh Aravind. She also made her Malayalam debut with The Prince opposite Mohanlal, directed by Tamil director Suresh Krissna fresh from the success of Baashha. The same year, she made her Telugu debut with Dharma Chakram. In 1999 the super success of her films had catapulted her to the top spot in Kannada movies. Chandramuki Pranasakhi, Upendra and V. Ravichandran's Naanu Nanna Hendthiru in Kannada and the Telugu language film, Devi which collected Rs. 18 crores at the box-office and was dubbed into Hindi as well.

In 2000 she saw 6 releases of which Yajamana opposite Vishnuvardhan was a runaway hit. 2001 proved lucky with the female-centric Kanasugara, the remake of Tamil film Unnidathil Ennai Koduthen, which fetched her the Filmfare Award for Best Actress and many other awards for her portrayal of a simple girl who becomes a famous singer. Her main release in 2002 was Sunil Kumar Desai's musical Parva co-starring Vishnuvardhan and Roja Selvamani. In 2003, she was praised by critics for her complex role in Singaravva. In 2004, Prema played Vishnuvardhan's leading lady in Apthamitra, the Kannada remake of Malayalam Manichitrathazhu by P. Vasu.

She has shared screen space with Vishnuvardhan in seven films - Yajamana, Apthamitra, Jamindaru, Kshana Kshana, Ekadantha, Parva, and Ellaranthalla Nanna Ganda.

Post her marriage in 2006, Prema cut down on her film assignments. Her last release was Shishira in 2009 before taking a hiatus. In 2017 she made her comeback with Upendra Matte Baa. She has, thus far, acted in more than 70 movies in Kannada and more than 28 movies in Telugu.

== Awards ==
- 1996: Karnataka State Film Award for Best Actress — Om
- 2001: South Filmfare Award for Best Kannada Actress — Kanasugara

== Filmography ==
Key
†	Denotes films that have not yet been released

Year	Film	Role	Language	Notes
1995	Savyasachi	Raadha	Kannada	
1995	Om	Madhuri	Kannada	Karnataka State Film Award for Best Actress
1995	Aata Hudugata	Prema	Kannada	
1995	Police Power	Bhagya	Kannada	
1996	Nammoora Mandara Hoove	Suma	Kannada	Udaya Film Award for Best Actress
1996	The Prince	Swarna	Malayalam	
1996	Dharma Chakram	Surekha	Telugu	
1996	Jagadeka Veerudu		Telugu	
1996	Adirindi Guru		Telugu	
1997	Atta Nee Koduku Jagratta	Prema	Telugu	
1997	Korukunna Priyudu	Priya	Telugu	
1997	Chelikaadu	Likhita	Telugu	
1997	Omkaram	Madhuri	Telugu	
1997	Ellaranthalla Nanna Ganda	Nethra	Kannada	
1998	Thutta Mutta	Pooja	Kannada	
1998	Kowrava	Shashi	Kannada	
1998	Shanti Shanti Shanti	Suzy	Kannada	
1998	Maa Aavida Collector	Meena	Telugu	
1998	Dheerga Sumangali Bhava		Telugu	
1998	Kangalin Vaarthaigal	Janaki	Tamil	
1999	Chandramukhi Pranasakhi	Sahana	Kannada	Cinema Express Award for Best Actress
1999	Chandrodaya	Divya	Kannada	
1999	Naanu Nanna Hendthiru	Manisha	Kannada	
1999	Upendra	Swathi	Kannada	
1999	Z	Prema	Kannada	
1999	Devi	Devi	Telugu	Gemini Film award for Best Actress
1999	Raghavayya Gari Abbayi		Telugu	
2000	Naga Devathe	Nagalakshmi	Kannada	
2000	Maya Bazaar	Roopa and Deepa	Kannada	
2000	Nuvve Kavali	Cameo	Telugu	
2000	Ammo! Okato Tareekhu	Dhanalaakshmi	Telugu	
2000	Ee Tharam Nehru	Sumanjali	Telugu	
2000	Rayalaseema Ramanna Chowdary	Nagasulochana	Telugu	
2000	Nannavalu Nannavalu	Chandu	Kannada	Asianet Kaveri Film Award for Best Actress (also for Yajamana and Chandramuki Pranasakhi)
2000	Chiru Navvutho	Aruna	Telugu	
2000	Uttara Dhruvadim Dakshina Dhruvaku	Nandini	Kannada	
2000	Yajamana	Sangeetha	Kannada	ETV Film Award for Best Actress
2000	Daivathinte Makan	Anjali	Malayalam	
2000	Gajina Mane		Kannada	
2001	Anjali Geethanjali	Anjali	Kannada	
2001	Kanasugara	Sangeetha	Kannada	Filmfare Award for Best Actress – Kannada
2001	Premi No.1	Radha	Kannada	
2001	Kothigalu Saar Kothigalu	Lalitha	Kannada	
2001	Grama Devathe	Kaveri	Kannada	
2001	Neelambari	Durga	Kannada	
2001	Prematho Raa	Sandhya	Telugu	
2001	Devi Putrudu	Goddess	Telugu	
2002	Parva	Suma	Kannada	
2002	Mutthu	Saraswathi	Kannada	
2002	Chelvi	Chelvi	Kannada	
2002	Tapori	Chameli	Kannada	
2002	Jamindaru	Ganga	Kannada	
2002	Balarama	Sevanthi	Kannada	
2002	Prema	Prema	Kannada	
2002	Kambalahalli		Kannada	
2002	Singaravva	Singaravva	Kannada	
2002	Marma	Sudha	Kannada	
2003	Mooru Manasu Nooru Kanasu	Lakshmi	Kannada	
2003	Hey Nan Bheeshma Kano		Kannada	
2003	Sri Renuka Devi		Kannada	
2003	Ananda Nilaya		Kannada	
2003	Vijayadashami		Kannada	
2003	Love Passagali	Pooja	Kannada	
2003	Janaki Weds Sriram	Prema	Telugu	
2004	Apthamitra	Soumya	Kannada	
2004	Azhagesan	Nandhini	Tamil	
2005	Inspector Jhansi	Jhansi	Kannada	
2005	Pandu Ranga Vittala	Prema	Kannada	
2005	Devi Abhayam	Naag Devi	Telugu	
2005	Ayodhya	Jyothi	Telugu	
2006	A Aa E Ee		Kannada	
2007	Ekadantha	Bhakti	Kannada	
2007	Kshana Kshana	Phalguni	Kannada	
2007	Dhee	Shankar's wife	Telugu	
2008	Sundarakanda	Seetha	Telugu	
2008	Krishnarjuna		Telugu	
2008	Navashakthi Vaibhava	Chamundeshwari	Kannada	
2008	Adivishnu	Prema	Telugu	
2009	Anjani Putrudu		Telugu	
2009	Shishira		Kannada	
2017	Upendra Matte Baa	Sathyabhama	Kannada	
2022	Anukoni Prayanam	Gayatri	Telugu	
2022	Wedding Gift	Prema	Kannada	
2023	My Name Is Shruthi	Dr. Kiranmayi	Telugu	
2024	Razakar	Anthamma	Telugu	
2025	Kishkindhapuri	Visravaputra's mother	Telugu	
2026	Suyodhana	Mahathi	Telugu	
