= Murgod =

Village in Karnataka, India

Murgod ಮುರುಗೋಡು
- Village
- Location in Karnataka, India Murgod ಮುರುಗೋಡು (India)
- Coordinates: 15.78°N 75.12°E
- Country: India
- State: Karnataka
- District: Belagavi
- Assembly constituency: Bailhongal
- Talukas: Savadatti

Population (2001)
  - Total: 11,033

Languages
  - Official: Kannada
- Time zone: UTC+5:30 (IST)
- PIN: 591 119
- Telephone code: 08337
- Vehicle registration: KA 24 (Bailhongal)

Murgod/Murugodu is a village in the southern state of Karnataka in India. It is located in the Savadatti taluk of Belagavi district in Karnataka, 491 km from the capital Bengaluru and 54 km from district headquarters Belagavi.

== Demographics ==
As of 2001 India census, Murgod has a population of 11,033 with 5,537 males and 5,496 females. Run in part by grama panchayath, Murgod has 28 ward members, and good bus facilities. Located 11 km away from Bailhongal and 15 km from Yaragatti, three sides of the city are overshadowed by hills.

== Mythology ==
At the time of Mahabharata, Murgod was called Amarkalyan though the name was later changed to Threeshigapura (in Kannada it means Mooru-gudda). Eventually, the name became Murgod. Murgod is the holy place for Saint Basava and Shiva Avataar. Shri Mahant Duradhundishwara Math and Purnabrahamha Shri Shiv Chidambara Mahaswami Punya Kshetra attracts devotees across India.

Some other holy places in Murgod are "Shri Mallikarjuna Temple" which is built similarly to "Shrishail Mallikarjuna Temple". Its ancient architecture is very attractive.

"Pandavar Padi" (Pandavar Hill). There is a myth that, in the time of Mahabharath, Pandavas crossed through this village : that is the reason why it is called "Pandavara Padi".

"Siddappana Gavi"(Siddappa's Cave) when Yadeyur Siddalingeshwar came to this village, they stayed in this cave.

Other sites of interest around village are "Shri Kshetra Sogal", "Naveelathirth Dam Munavalli".

== Economy ==
The population is engaged in agriculture and related activities. Cotton and jowar (sorghum) are suited to the semi-arid climate.

It is a center of commerce for the surrounding villages of Karimani, Rudrapur, Sogal, Somapur etc. In the village, there is a type of bhel called "Sangheet Khara". Pottery is also a main craft for people of Murgod. Pottery made in this village is exported to Maharashtra and Andhra Pradesh. This village is famous for green bangles. There is a huge market in Maharashtra, North Karnataka. Prathmik Krushi Pattin Shakari Shanga Ltd. Murgod is one of the best societies in Soundatti Taluka in an Agricultural Sector. Corporation Bank, Shri Mahanteshwar Bank and Shri Chidambar co-op society are the major banks in Murgod. Shri Akkamahadevi co-op society, Shri Jyoti co-op society and Parishrama Pattina Sahakari Sangha, Nirantar Vivadoshagal Sahakari Co-Op Society are the other finance sectors.

== Education ==
Shri Mahanteshwar Shikshana Samiti is a top education society in Murgod. It has a high school, a primary school, P U college (Arts), JODC (Job Oriented Diploma Course) and D.Ed. (Diploma in Education) courses. It was established 30 years back. It is working under the direction of Shri Mahant Shivoyogi and headed by Shri Neelakanth Mahaswamy.

Dr. B.R.Ambedkar High School.

Kannada Government Boys and Girls Primary School.

Shri Shiv Chidambareshwar Educational Institute which also provides good education to rural children.

Chidambareshwar Institute which has English middle as well as Kannada middle schools, this Institute is directed by Shri Shiv Chidambar Math.

== Notable people ==
- Balappa Hukkeri - Theatre personality, folk singer
- Renukamma Murgod - Theatre and film actress
- [[Purushottamrao Yarazarvi [Rayaru]] - Santa's

== See also ==
- Belagavi
- Districts of Karnataka
