= Ekadantha =

- VCD cover
- Directed by: Sachin Pilgaonkar
- Written by: Sachin Pilgaonkar
- Based on: Navra Maza Navsacha by Sachin Pilgaonkar
- Produced by: Sriram; Gopi; Kumar
- Starring: Vishnuvardhan; Ramesh Aravind; Prema
- Cinematography: P. K. H. Das
- Edited by: T. Shashikumar
- Music by: Gurukiran
- Production company: Ekadantha Productions
- Release date: 16 March 2007
- Running time: 147 minutes
- Country: India
- Language: Kannada

Ekadantha is a 2007 Indian Kannada-language comedy drama film directed and written by Bollywood actor - director Sachin starring Vishnuvardhan, Ramesh Aravind and Prema. It features soundtrack from Gurukiran. Released on 16 March 2007, the film met with average and critical response at the box-office.

The film is a remake of his 2004 Marathi film Navra Maza Navsacha which was inspired by the 1972 Hindi movie Bombay to Goa which in turn was a remake of 1966 Tamil movie Madras to Pondicherry.

== Cast ==
- Vishnuvardhan as Vijay
- Ramesh Arvind as Vakrathunda "Vyakky"
- Prema as Bhakthi
- Ramesh Bhat as Mallayya
- Mimicry Dayanand as Diamond Danny
- Umashri as Sheela Devi
- Mandya Ramesh as the dumb guy who is an undercover officer
- Bank Janardhan as teacher who is co-passenger in bus
- Girija Lokesh as Girija
- Maria Monica Susairaj as an RJ and co-passenger in the bus
- Mandeep Roy as Auto rickshaw Driver Kishore
- Kaminidharan as Malayali co-passenger
- Kamala Prakash
- Roopesh Gowda
- Bhanu Prakash
- Sachin
- Apoorva as Diamomd Danny's wife
- Rathnamaala as Diamomd Danny's wife
- Shivajirao Jadhav as co-passenger
- Joe Simon as director
- Vaijanath Biradar as a struggling actor
- Mohan Juneja as a co-passenger in the bus
- R. G. Vijayasarathy
- M. N. Suresh
- Rachana Maurya as an item dancer in "E Sonta Nodu"
- Gurukiran in a guest appearance as himself

== Production ==
The film came into fruition in 2005 when Sachin told his friend Vishnuvardhan about his novel's positive reception when he made it into a Marathi film. Vishnuvardhan suggested Sachin make the novel into a Kannada film. The film's producers previously produced News (2004). The film was shot in Ganpatipule, Maharastra.

== Soundtrack ==
All the songs are composed and scored by Gurukiran.

Sl No	Song title	Singer(s)	Lyrics
1	"Bandal Badaayi"	Gurukiran	Gurukiran
2	"Ganapati Bappa"	S. P. Balasubrahmanyam, K. S. Chithra	V. Manohar
3	"Ekadantha"	S. P. Balasubrahmanyam, K. S. Chithra	Goturi
4	"Hogona Hogona"	Gurukiran, Shamita Malnad	V. Manohar
5	"Ee Sonta Nodu"	Vishnuvardhan, Malgudi Subha, Sachin	Shiva

== Reception ==
=== Critical response ===
R. G. Vijayasarathy of IANS wrote that "This is one film which entertains you fully barring the first ten or fifteen minutes which has been surprisingly lagging and has some jarring sequences. But once Dr. Vishnuvardhan's character makes an entry into the scene, the film takes off to zoom and then it is zoom...vroom...ooh.... haa for the viewers. It is laughter all the while with each character in the film trying his level best to make the audience laugh". Rediff.com wrote that "Ekadantha simply rocks -- it's an enjoyable film all the way".
