= Om (1995 film) =

1995 Indian Kannada film by Upendra

Om (1995)
- Theatrical re-release poster
- Directed by: Upendra
- Written by: S. Muralimohan (dialogues)
- Screenplay by: Upendra
- Story by: Upendra
- Produced by: Parvathamma Rajkumar
- Starring: Shiva Rajkumar; Prema
- Cinematography: B. C. Gowrishankar
- Edited by: T. Shashikumar
- Music by: Hamsalekha
- Production company: Poornima Enterprises
- Distributed by: Sri Vajreshwari Combines
- Release date: 19 May 1995
- Running time: 150 minutes
- Country: India
- Language: Kannada
- Budget: ₹75 lakh
- Box office: ₹10 crore

Om, stylized as ॐ, is a 1995 Indian Kannada-language romantic gangster drama film written and directed by Upendra. The film was produced by Parvathamma Rajkumar under the production company Sri Vajreshwari Combines. The film stars Shiva Rajkumar and Prema with Srishanthi, G. V. Shivanand, Sadhu Kokila in supporting roles with real-life gangsters - Bekkina Kannu Rajendra, Tanveer, Korangu Krishna and Jedaralli Krishnappa - portraying the role of gangsters in a small but important portion of the film.

Om was remade in Telugu as Omkaram (1997) starring Rajasekhar and Prema which was also directed by Upendra. Hamsalekha was also the music director of the Telugu remake and retained the songs in the Telugu version. The film was unofficially remade in Hindi as Arjun Pandit (1999). The movie inspired 3 Bangladeshi movies - while the 2003 movie Bastob starring Manna, remained a faithful remake, Manna had also earlier starred in the 2001 film Panja whose core plotline was loosely inspired by Om with a change in narration pattern. Later, in 2009, another movie titled Prem Koyedi, starring Shakib Khan, copied the interval twist and the hero transformation scenes from Om. UP gangster Vikas Dubey was reported to be an ardent fan of Arjun Pandit.

The film became a successful venture at the box office and was declared an industry hit. It remains a cult classic in Kannada cinema with a dedicated fan following among audience owing to its re-release every two weeks. This film has a Limca record for re-releasing more than 550 times. The movie was reported to be the highest screened film in the history of Kannada cinema. The movie has released 30 times in Kapali theatre, Bangalore which is a record. On the occasion of completion of 25 years, Upendra had revealed that the core plot of the film was based on a real-life person - Purshi who was his brother's friend. The film is credited for ushering in the genre of underworld mafia in a full-fledged manner in Kannada cinema.

== Plot ==
Shashi is a journalist who interviews underworld gangsters and provides a book titled ॐ, which is written by her and requests them to read. In the book, Shashi, who was interviewing about the Bangalore Underworld learns about a gangster named Satyamurthy "Satya" Shastri, who has been forcing a college student named Madhuri "Madhu" to love him by day, but is also involved in oil smuggling activities by Oil Raja at night. One night, Satya meets another gangster named Rayan where he reveals that Raja has hired a hitman named Kutty to kill him. Satya stabs Kutty, but manages to survive despite being severely injured and also kills Oil Raja at his mansion, where his wife Maria becomes the eyewitness. After being provided with an iota, Shashi told him he would be waiting for Madhuri at his friend Geetha's house. The cops chase Satya but manage to escape, leaving Madhu. Shashi learns about Satya's past from Geetha:

Satya was a humble college student and the son of a brahmin priest named Sreekantha Shastri, who is leading a happy life with his mother and three sisters: Sujatha, Suma, and Gowri. At his house, Satya is visited by Dheena's brother Ponna, who wants to stay away from Madhu, whom Dheena is in love with. Madhu is attracted to Satya and keeps talking to him, and Satya falls in love with Madhu, who instills the courage to fight back. At the college, Satya hacks Dheena and Ponna, who survive with severe injuries. Madhu testifies that Satya hacked the brothers for personal vengeance where he is tortured in police custody, but is granted bail by Ponna's boss Jayaraj. Satya visits Madhu where he learns that she is his friend Harish's sister. In a past event, Satya and Harish witnessed the killing of a girl by Ponna. Ponna and his gang frame Harish for the murder and threaten to kill Satya if he doesn't testify against Harish.

Satya is reluctant but is forced to lie at the court that Harish is the murderer of his family. Distraught, Harish commits suicide in jail. Subsequently, Harish's and Madhu's mother dies from shock. Madhu planned vengeance against Ponna where she used Satya as a weapon to kill Ponna while also tarnishing Satya's life. Satya is also ousted by his father Sreekantha Shastri, where he joins hands with Jayaraj. In the present, Satya takes Madhu to propose to her, but Madhu stabs Satya and escapes. However, Satya arrives at Madhu's house alive where he takes Shashi to a room and quietly asks her to help him convince Madhu of his innocence. Shashi agrees, and the two orchestrate a drama and make Madhu realize her mistake. Having seen Satya's family's condition, Madhu feels guilty and decides to change Satya to his past self. Meanwhile, Kutty and Ponna brainwash Rayan against Satya, leading to a gang war at the former's sister's wedding, but Satya executes the henchmen in front of his family.

When the cops arrive, Madhu takes Satya and escapes, but Satya's sister alliance is broken due to Satya's actions. Sreekantha Shastri performs a funeral, claiming that Satya is dead, which leads Satya heartbroken. Madhu tries to console Satya while professing her love for him and tells Satya to be his normal self, and she also tells him about Rayan's involvement in the attack. Enraged and ignorant of Madhu, Satya attacks Rayan at a restaurant but Rayan escapes. Madhu begins fasting till Satya changes his ways. Satya learns about Kutty's release from prison and his involvement in the death of Jayaraj and his gang members, so he hacks him to death at night. Madhu is admitted to the hospital where Satya meets her, but Rayan and his henchmen also arrive at the hospital. At this point in the film, the book's ending pages are missing, so the gangsters contact Shashi to find out about the ending.

Shashi takes them to a dhaba, where she reveals what happened at the hospital. At the hospital, Satya tells the gangsters to finish him, and he also promises Madhu that he will lead a life free from the underworld. After making the promise, one of Satya's legs is chopped and Madhu's face is half-burnt by the acid thrown by one of the goons. Rayan and the others realize that Satya has changed, so they leave him to start a new life. It is revealed that Shashi brought them to Satya, who is a changed man, running a dhaba and leading a happy life with Madhu and his children. After seeing the happiness of Satya and his family, the gangsters realize their mistake and retire from the underworld to live a peaceful life with their families, with the film ending with a message of peace.

== Cast ==
- Shiva Rajkumar as Satyamurthy "Satya" Shastri
- Prema as Madhuri "Madhu"
- Srishanthi as Shashi, a journalist of Krantiveera
- G. V. Shivanand as Narasimha, Madhu's father
- Upasane Seetharam as Sreekantha Shastri, Satya's father
- Honnavalli Krishna as a press photographer in Krantiveera
- Sadhu Kokila as Shankar
- V. Manohar as Chennakeshava, Editor-in-chief of Krantiveera
- Vanishree as Sujatha, Satya's sister
- Sandhya as Suma, Sathya's sister
- Michael Madhu as Michael
- Bekkina Kannu Rajendra as himself
- Tanveer as himself
- Korangu Krishna as himself
- Jedaralli Krishnappa as himself
- Ajay as "Srirampura" Kutty
- Dileep as Jai
- S. Murali Mohan as Harish, Madhuri's brother
- Harish Rai as Don Roy
- Kote Prabhakar as Dheena, Ponna's brother (Voice dubbed by Upendra)
- Tumkur Mohan as Ponna, Dheena's brother
- Vikram Udayakumar as Inspector
- Sriraksha Shivakumar as Geetha, Madhu's friend
- Balu Murugaraj
- Sriraj Kothari
- John
- Sukumar
- Shankar Narayan
- Ashwath Narayan
- N. Lokanath
- Mysore Anand
- Suresh Rai

Uncredited

- Master Vinay as Satya and Madhu's elder son
- Master Yuva as Satya and Madhu's younger son

== Production ==
=== Development ===
Upendra wrote a part of the story during his days in college in the late-1980s. Purushottam, a friend of Upendra, brought to him a letter written by someone that caught his attention. Drawing inspiration from it, he drafted the first part of the story, that he subsequently developed, although incompletely. He also revealed that had always wanted make a film on organized crime and mafia, based on real-life incidents. He said he was "disappointed" on learning that the screenplay of 1989 film Siva had a similar storyline to what he had written. He began working as a dialogue writer and songwriter in Kannada cinema during the time, and the first half of the 1990s saw him direct two films, Tharle Nan Maga (1992) and Shhh! (1993). Alongside, he developed the storyline and wrote a screenplay with the plot taking sequences of flashback, which he said "took another form" at the end of completion.

=== Casting ===
Having given the film a working title as Satya, Upendra initially decided to cast Kumar Govind as the eponymous lead, who he had previously collaborated with, in Shhh!. However, later, eager to cast Shiva Rajkumar in the role, Upendra approached actor Honnavalli Krishna in 1994, and persuaded him to speak the matter over to Shiva's father and actor, Rajkumar. Krishna spoke to S. P. Varadappa, Rajkumar's brother, who invited Upendra and him over to their house in Bangalore. Impressed by the story narrated by Upendra in a span of ten minutes using newspaper cuttings of oil mafia to elaborate on the subject, Rajkumar gave the go-ahead and Shiva was signed as the male lead. Rajkumar also agreed to produce the film and handed an amount of ₹50,000 over to Upendra the same day. Shiva had till then portrayed roles predominantly of a romantic hero in his then career of 8 years. Speaking on casting him, Upendra said he was drawn by Shiva's "powerful brownish-shaded eyes" and wanted to "make full use of it". Many actresses had been speculated to play the role of the female lead Madhuri, in the film, including then popular Hindi film actress Juhi Chawla. Finally, on Rajkumar's approval, Prema, a newcomer then, who was already filming with Shiva in Savyasachi, was cast in the role. Real-life gangsters Bekkinakannu Rajendra, Korangu Krishna, Tanveer Ahmad and Jedarahalli Krishna made cameo appearances in the film.

=== Filming ===
The principal photography began on 7 December 1994 in Bangalore. On the day, Rajkumar wrote the spiritual icon "ॐ" on the film's screenplay material using kumkuma, which was later made the title design for the film. B. C. Gowrishankar who handled cinematography used a warm, yellow tone and employed filters throughout the film to diffuse the violence and the colour of the blood.

== Soundtrack ==
Om

Soundtrack album by Hamsalekha
- Genre: Feature film soundtrack
- Length: 24:28
- Label: Magnasound

Hamsalekha composed the film score and the film's soundtrack, also writing its lyrics. In September 2015, the rights for the soundtrack album was acquired by Sony Music Entertainment, and was released digitally. All the songs including Hey Dinakara and O Gulabiye were well received and became chartbusters.

Track list
No.	Title	Lyrics	Singer(s)	Length
1.	"Hey Dinakara"	Hamsalekha	Rajkumar	5:08
2.	"College Kumaru"	Hamsalekha	Mano	5:07
3.	"Mehabooba"	Hamsalekha	Mano	4:58
4.	"O Gulaabiye"	Hamsalekha	Rajkumar, Rathnamala Prakash	4:58
5.	"Amruthavanthe Premada"	Hamsalekha	Mano	4:17
Total length:				24:28

== Release ==
The film was made on a budget of ₹68–75 lakh. H. D. Kumaraswamy bought the rights to distribute the film for the Mysore area and made a small fortune.

=== Re release ===
The movie crossed its 500th re-release mark in 2013. As of March 2015, Om had been re-released over 550 times and in over 400 theatres across Karnataka. On 12 March 2015, the film was re-released with digital intermediate and DTS for the first time in over 100 theatres. It was distributed by Kishore Films.

=== Pre-release business ===
Om earned approximately ₹2 crores in pre-release business.

=== Home media ===
Even though the film was released in 1995, its satellite rights was sold to Udaya TV only in 2015 for a sum of ₹10 crores. The film had its television premiere on 15 August 2015 on the eve of Independence Day. The amount is the highest for any Kannada film considering that the film is already 20 years old and has been released hundreds of times. Video rights was released by Sri Ganesh Video.

== Awards ==
1995–96 Karnataka State Film Awards

- Best Actor — Shiva Rajkumar
- Best Actress — Prema
- Best Screenplay — Upendra
- Best Cinematographer — B. C. Gowrishankar

43rd South Filmfare Awards

- Best Actor — Shiva Rajkumar

== Legacy ==
Om attained cult status in Kannada cinema. It became a trendsetter in the genre of films based on gangsters. Rediff in its review of Darshan starrer Shastri (2005) called it "poor imitation of the trendsetting Kannada film, Om". Murali Mohan who worked as an assistant in Om made his directorial debut with Santha (2007) which had a similar plot.

In 1999, the film was unofficially remade in Hindi as Arjun Pandit (1999) by Rahul Rawail which stars Sunny Deol and Juhi Chawla in leading roles was criticized by film viewers for deviating from the storyline.
