= Chandramukhi Pranasakhi =

- Film poster
- Directed by: Seetharama Karanth
- Written by: Shashidhar Bhat (Dialogues)
- Screenplay by: Seetharam Karanth
- Story by: Seetharam Karanth
- Produced by: N. K. Prakash Babu
- Starring: Ramesh Aravind; Prema; Bhavana
- Cinematography: R. Giri
- Edited by: P. R. Sounder Raj
- Music by: K. Kalyan
- Production company: Sri Matha Pictures
- Release date: 30 July 1999
- Running time: 2 hours 39 minutes
- Country: India
- Language: Kannada

Chandramukhi Pranasakhi is a 1999 Indian Kannada-language film, directed by Seetharam Karanth, starring Ramesh Aravind, Prema and Bhavana. It's one of the highest grossing Kannada films of the year 1999. The movie is considered one of the best movies in the career of Ramesh Aravind. At the 1999–2000 Karnataka State Film Awards, the film won two awards, Third Best Film and Best Music Director (K. Kalyan). The film was later remade in Telugu language as Naalo Unna Prema.

== Plot ==
The movie begins with Susheel listening to a music programme. He falls in love with the singer of the programme, Sahana. The plot continues with Susheel attending the marriage of his best friend in a remote village. Instead of reaching the groom's place, he arrives at the bride's place. There, he comes across a troublesome girl, Bhavana. She immediately starts messing with Susheel for fun. Susheel starts to hate Bhavana. Susheel realizes he needs to get back to the groom's place, but his attempts keep failing due to various reasons. Somehow at the end of the day, he manages to find a person from the groom's place who is taking people back to the groom's place.

On the day of the wedding, Susheel learns that Bhavana is the sister of Sahana. On the other hand, Bhavana keeps playing pranks on Susheel. Tired of these pranks, Susheel decides to take revenge on Bhavana. This revenge results in Bhavana missing the crucial time of marriage. This makes Bhavana angry. She vows to make Susheel pay.

Susheel comes back to his place. He is happy that he got to meet his crush i.e. Sahana. His maternal uncle convinces him to write a letter to Sahana so that they can develop a friendship. This letter reaches Sahana's place. But Bhavana gets hold of this letter. Acting on her grudge to take revenge on Susheel she decides to manipulate him, she acts like Sahana and starts talking with Susheel. She makes him believe that he is talking to Sahana. She reveals this only to her best friend.

Though she started to talk with Susheel only for revenge, she eventually starts falling in love with him. When he sends a locket which contains his and Sahana's photos, she starts wearing it saying she got it from her friend. She completely changes herself for him. Though she hated wearing sarees before she loves doing the same now. She even starts to cook. She also starts to get very depressed because she realizes she is cheating him. The fact that he loves her sister makes her very worried. She starts to realize that one day she needs to tell everyone the truth, and gets very tensed thinking of that day.

One day Susheel gets a chance to work near Sahana's place, so he decides to visit her on that day. He tells this to Bhavana(he thinks he s talking to Sahana). Bhavana decides to tell everything to Susheel on the day of his visit. She arranges things so that none of her family members are at home on the day of Susheel's visit. But on the day of the visit, she gets scared that he will not accept her if she tells him the truth. So she doesn't tell him the truth. Susheel seeing that Sahana is not at home even though he had told her of his visit, gets a bit depressed. But due to some circumstances, Ramesh sees Sahana at the railway station and he thinks she has come to see him. So he talks to Sahana in a loud voice as the train starts moving, leaving Sahana very confused.

Meanwhile, Susheel, gets to know through a newspaper that Sahana is about to perform in Town Hall, Bengaluru. And for that concert she wishes to wear the locket which Bhavana carries along with her, though unwilling to hand it over to Sahana, but accedes later and gives her the locket. For the concert, Susheel his uncle, accompanied by Mom visits, and by the end of it, he tries to speak to Sahana. she treats him as any other fan and friction arises, which leads to a slap. In fit of anger, she arrives to her residence and confronts her sister Bhavana, who is listening to the song sung by Susheel. Both sisters get into an argument which is later paused by their parents and a similar situation arises in Susheel's premises too. The elders think it worthy to have a word facing each other. Susheel visits, he feels sorry for slapping Sahana after her concert, Sahana's father asks her to speak with him alone to understand each other, Susheel enquires about Bhavana, who is hiding and listening to their talks. Susheel, who is angry, speaks to Bhavana asking whether she is OK if he marries her sister Sahana, for which she answers yes. But he says no, because it is Bhavana who reciprocated his feeling for his letter and phone calls and he wishes to marry Bhavana, not Sahana, because she doesn't have any feelings towards him.

The movie ends with the elders happy with the decision made by their children. Sahana is happy that her sister found her love.

== Cast ==
- Ramesh Aravind as Susheel
- Prema as Sahana
- Bhavana as Bhavana
- Srinivasa Murthy as Govindaiah, Susheel's uncle
- Vaishali Kasaravalli as Susheel's mother
- Shivaram as Ex-Colonel Ramarao, Sahana's father
- B. V. Radha as Sahana's mother
- Akhila as Kavya, Bhavana's friend
- Mandeep Roy
- M. N. Suresh
- Mysore Ramanand
- Renukamma Murugodu
- Cheluva Murthy
- Seetharam Karanth
- Shashidhar Bhat

== Production ==
After a series of small budget films, Bhavana was cast as a tomboy character in the film. Since the role was similar to her real life self, Bhavana had freedom to what she wanted with the role. The film was shot in locations at Honnavar, Sirsi, Gokarna and Agumbe.

== Soundtrack ==
Chandramukhi Pranasakhi
- Soundtrack cover

Soundtrack album by K. Kalyan
- Released: 6 May 1999
- Genre: Feature film soundtrack
- Length: 41:19
- Label: Lahari Music

K. Kalyan composed the background score for the film and the soundtracks, also writing the lyrics for all the soundtracks. The album has eight soundtracks. This film provided a breakthrough for K. Kalyan and the film's music became popular.

Track list
No.	Title	Singer(s)	Length
1.	"Nenapugala Maathu Madhura"	S. P. Balasubrahmanyam, K. S. Chithra	5:02
2.	"Manase O Manase"	K. S. Chithra, Badri Prasad	5:08
3.	"Aralo Hunnime"	S. P. Balasubrahmanyam	4:49
4.	"El El Mallige"	S. P. Balasubrahmanyam, K. S. Chithra, Bhutto	4:56
5.	"Modala Prema Patrave"	K. S. Chithra, S. P. Balasubrahmanyam	6:46
6.	"Chiguru Bombeye"	K. S. Chithra	4:49
7.	"Chandramukhi Hoy"	Chorus	4:45
8.	"Ondu Prema Pallakkiya Mele"	K. S. Chithra, S. P. Balasubrahmanyam	5:04
Total length:			41:19

== Box-office ==
Chandramukhi Pranasakhi was a hit at the box office, with melodious songs composed by K. Kalyan.It was one of the highest grossing Kannada films of the year 1999. The film was one among the twenty films considered good quality by the Karnataka state government and was given a subsidy of ₹ 10 lakh. The movie is considered one of the milestone movies in the career of actress Bhavana.

== Awards ==
Karnataka State Film Awards 1999-2000

- Third Best Film - Sri Matha Pictures and Seetharama Karanth
- Best Music Director – K. Kalyan

Filmfare Awards South - 1999

- Best Music Director - K. Kalyan

== Impact ==
In a write-up from 2010, a writer from Rediff.com said that actress Bhavana made a name for herself with this film and Inti Ninna Prethiya.

In a write-up from 2020, a writer from Deccan Herald opined that Ramesh Aravind "played his roles to a T in complex dramas like Mungarina Minchu (1997), Hoomale (1998) and Chandramukhi Pranasakhi (1999)".
