= Renukamma Murgod =

Indian Kannada theatre and film actress (1932-2008)

- Born: Renukamma Murugodu; 1932; Murgod, Savadatti, Belagavi, Karnataka, India
- Died: 25 June 2008 (aged 76); Murgod
- Other name: Renukaajji
- Occupation: Actress
- Known for: Theatre, Soap and Film acting

Renukamma Murugodu was an Indian actress who worked in Kannada film industry. She began acting at 13 and performed in many dramas, soaps and films including Kraurya, Nammura Mandara Hoove and Shabdavedhi.

Renukamma was a winner of the Gubbi Veeranna Award. She died at 76.

== Filmography ==
Some of Renukamma's movies are listed here:

- 1996-Nammoora Mandara Hoove
- 1996-Kraurya
- 1997-Prema Raga Hadu Gelati
- 1998-Hoomale
- 1999-Veerappa Nayka
- 1999-Chandramukhi Pranasakhi
- 2000-Shabdavedhi
- 2001-Mussanje
- 2002-Parva
- 2002-Joot
- 2003-Artha
- 2003-Chandra Chakori
- 2003-Kushalave Kshemave
- 2004-Pravaha
- 2004-Ranga SSLC
- 2004-Darshan
- 2007-Ninade Nenapu
- 2007-Arasu
