= The Prince (1996 film) =

- Theatrical release poster
- Directed by: Suresh Krissna
- Written by: T. A. Razzaq (dialogues)
- Screenplay by: Suresh Krishna
- Produced by: Kochumon
- Starring: Mohanlal; Prema; Prakash Raj; Girish Karnad
- Cinematography: V. Pratap
- Edited by: Ganesh Kumar
- Music by: Deva
- Production company: Casino Pictures
- Distributed by: Casino Release
- Release date: 23 August 1996
- Country: India
- Language: Malayalam

The Prince is a 1996 Indian Malayalam-language gangster film scripted and directed by Suresh Krissna, starring Mohanlal and Prema. Dialogues were written by T. A. Razzaq. The film marked the Malayalam cinema debut of accomplished Tamil director, Krishna and actor Prakash Raj. The music was scored by Deva. The film was dubbed and released in Tamil as Mahaan.

== Plot ==
It was a story of the other side of a Mafia family. Jeeva, son of a Don Vishwanath, falls in love with Swarna, daughter of a famous Carnatic singer. He hides the truth of his family background from her to win her love. But she learns of this, and uses silence to make him confess his situation. How Jeeva goes through trials and tribulations of saving his love on one side and law of the mafia on the other side forms the theme of the film.

== Cast ==
- Mohanlal as Jeeva "Prince" Viswanath
- Prema as Swarna
- Prakash Raj as Surya Das
- Girish Karnad as Viswanath
- Kakka Ravi
- Spadikam George as Rajashekharan
- Srividya
- Oduvil Unnikrishnan
- Jagannatha Varma
- Renuka

== Soundtrack ==
The soundtrack consists of six songs composed by Deva, with lyrics penned by Girish Puthenchery.

=== Malayalam (Original) ===
Song	Singer(s)
"Jum Thaka Jum Thaka"	M. G. Sreekumar, K. S. Chithra
"Shyamayam Radhike"	K. S. Chithra, Mohanlal
"Kannil Kannil Kannaadi"	M. G. Sreekumar, K.S. Chithra
"Cholakkilikal"	K. S. Chithra
"Nanda Nandana"	K. S. Chithra
"Thannana Thannana"	M. G. Sreekumar, K. S. Chithra
"Prince Theme"	Chorus

=== Telugu soundtrack (Dubbed) ===
Song	Singer(s)	Writer(s)
"Nee Padham"	K. S. Chithra	Vennelakanti
"Zumthaka"	Sujatha Mohan, S.P. Balasubrahmanyam	Vennelakanti
"Naadha Nandhana"	S. P. Sailaja	Vennelakanti
"Saage Thene"	K. S. Chithra, S.P. Balasubrahmanyam	Vennelakanti
"Korika Guvvala"	Sujatha Mohan, S.P. Balasubrahmanyam	Vennelakanti
"Cheekatimayama"	S. P. Sailaja	Vennelakanti

== Reception ==
The film was released on 27 August 1996. Prince was released with high expectations among audience, considering the director's previous release Baashha being a major success, but it underperformed at the box office.
