= Ananda (film) =

- Directed by: Vara Mullapudi
- Written by: V. Nagendra Prasad (dialogue)
- Story by: Srinu Vaitla
- Based on: Anandam by Srinu Vaitla
- Produced by: Ramoji Rao
- Starring: Naveen Mayur; Ruthika; Rajesh Nataranga; Jhansi Subbaiah
- Cinematography: P. K. H. Das
- Edited by: Manohar
- Music by: Rajesh Ramanath
- Production company: Usha Kiran Movies
- Release date: 14 February 2003
- Country: India
- Language: Kannada

Ananda is a 2003 Indian Kannada-language romantic drama film directed by Vara Mullapudi. A remake of the Telugu-language film Anandam, the film stars Naveen Mayur, Ruthika, Rajesh Nataranga, and Jhansi Subbaiah. The film was a box office success and ran for fifty days.

== Cast ==
- Naveen Mayur as Kiran
- Ruthika as Aishwarya
- Rajesh Nataranga as Raja
- Jhansi Subbaiah as Deepika
- Anant Nag
- Vanitha Vasu
- Dwarakish
- Padma Vasanthi
- Sharan as College Student
- Sanketh Kashi as Professor
- Sathyajith
- Venu
- Rakesh
- M. S. Umesh
- Shobha
- Niranjan

== Production ==
The film marked the directorial debut of Vara Mullapudi, son of Telugu screenwriter Mullapudi Venkata Ramana.

== Soundtrack ==
The soundtrack of the film was composed by Rajesh Ramanath, who reused all of the songs from the original.

All lyrics are written by K. Kalyan.

Track listing
No.	Title	Singer(s)	Length
1.	"Chikki Chikki Cham"	Badri Prasad	4:05
2.	"Kannu Theredaro"	Badri Prasad, Nanditha
3.	"Monalisa Monalisa"	Sudha Sampath, Rajesh Ramanath
4.	"Preethi Andre Enoo Andre"	Badri Prasad, Naga Chandrika, Rajesh Ramnath
5.	"Yaradaro (male)"	Badri
6.	"Yaradaro Kandeera (female)"	K. S. Chithra

== Reception ==
A critic from Deccan Herald wrote that "This film is a welcome relief for cine-goers and has come to their rescue notwithstanding the fact that Ananda is a remake of the Telugu superhit film Anandam. Yes, this one a relief for those people who have been longing to see a good Kannada film in the theatre". A critic from Viggy wrote that "In a nut shell, a good remake film - must see for Naveen fans. A good teenage and family entertainer".
