= Kanasugara =

2001 film by Karan

- DVD cover
- Directed by: Karan
- Written by: M. S. Ramesh (Dialogues)
- Screenplay by: Karan
- Story by: Vikraman
- Based on: Unnidathil Ennai Koduthen (Tamil)
- Produced by: Sa. Ra. Govindu
- Starring: V. Ravichandran; Prema; Shashikumar; Hema Choudhary; Mandya Ramesh
- Cinematography: G. S. V. Seetharam
- Edited by: Shyam Yadav
- Music by: Rajesh Ramanath
- Production company: Thanu Chitra
- Release date: 3 August 2001
- Running time: 147 minutes
- Country: India
- Language: Kannada

Kanasugara (transl. Dreamer) is a 2001 Indian Kannada-language romantic drama film directed by Karan. The film stars V. Ravichandran and Prema in lead roles and Shashikumar in guest appearance. Kanasugara is a remake of 1998 Tamil film Unnidathil Ennai Koduthen. Music is composed by Rajesh Ramanath.

The film was released on 3 August 2001 and received a good response at the box office. Actress Prema won the Best Actress at South Filmfare Awards for Kanasugara.

== Plot ==
Ravi (V. Ravichandran) and his friend Balu (Mandya Ramesh) are petty thieves who live their lives by stealing stuff from people. One day, they are assigned a job to steal a Ganesh Idol from the temple, for Don Delli (Tennis Krishna), who had just moved into a new house, citing prosperity as a reason. The friends succeed in stealing the idol, but are spotted by the people, who then start chasing them. They hide in a house and encounter Sangeeta(Prema). Sangeeta is a maid in the house and is looking after the owners' three children while the adults are away on a pilgrimage tour. Sangeeta and the kids lock the two of them in a room and order them to do stuff for three days. Sangeeta, while spending time alone in the house with the guys, realizes that they are not bad after all and develops a soft spot for Ravi, and he, in return, falls for her. The guys are released after three days, the day the owners are to return.

Balu steals Sangeeta's handbag, which contains her diary. Ravi reads the diary and finds out that Sangeeta is the illegitimate daughter of Lawyer Vishwanath (Srinath). After her mother's (Ambika) death, Sangeeta meets her father, who accepts her as his daughter but has to bring her into the house as a maid. Vishwanath's second wife, Vijaya (Hema Chaudary) and her sister, Vasanthi (Shanoor Sana) take an instant dislike for Sangeeta. They treat her with utter disgust and blame her for the tiniest of things. Vishwanath plans to arrange the marriage between Ajay (Shashi Kumar), his brother-in-law, and Sangeeta. But Ajay says that he doesn’t know if Sangeeta has the qualities to become his wife and said that he would have to think about it and asks for three months. Sangeeta waits for his reply. Ravi, after reading her diary, feels pity for her and tries to change his ways by working responsibly after Sangeeta's advice. He also hides his feelings for her.

After returning from the trip, Vijaya finds out that her diamond necklace is missing. When looking for it, she finds a cigarette bud in one of the drawers. She and her Vasanthi scold Sangeeta and chase her out. Ravi, who comes to return her bag, finds out and helps her to accommodate in a hostel. He does many petty jobs to pay the hostel fees and help Sangeeta. One day, Ravi finds out about Sangeeta's singing talent and tries to help her move on with it. He encounters music director V. Manohar late one night and helps him repair his car. In return, he asks the director to help Sangeeta out. Sangeeta, after singing a few songs, becomes successful in her singing career and becomes rich. She stays in her bungalow with Ravi and Balu.

During an interview, Sangeeta refrains from saying her father's name. Upset, Vishwanath reveals that he is the father. His wife, looking at Sangeeta's money, accepts Sangeeta as her daughter as well. They come to stay at her house. Vishwanath's wife does not like Ravi and Balu staying with them. They plan the wedding of Ajay and Sangeeta, as Ajay had accepted to marry Sangeeta, long time back. When Sangeeta had gone out of town with Ajay, to receive an award, Vishwanath's wife and sister-in-law staged a drama that Ravi stole Sangeeta's money and chased him and Balu out. Sangeeta comes back and is shocked. She finds Ravi's diary in his room and understands his love for her.

During an award ceremony, Sangeeta reveals that the reason for her success is not her family, but Ravi and she had fallen in love with him. She also tells her desire to marry him. Ravi who had arrived there to drop a passenger, sees it and is called upon the stage when Sangeeta sees him in a TV. In a short flashback, it is shown that Sangeeta had informed Ajay and Vishwanath about her love for Ravi and how Ajay had accepted it. The film ends with Ravi and Sangeeta leaving the place hand in hand.

== Cast ==
- Ravichandran as Ravi
- Prema as Sangeeta
- Shashikumar as Ajay (Guest Appearance)
- Anu Prabhakar (Guest Appearance)
- Hema Chaudhary as Vijaya
- Srinath as Lawyer Vishwanath
- Ambika as Sangeeta's mother
- Mandya Ramesh as Balu
- Doddanna
- Tennis Krishna as Don Delli
- Shanoor Sana as Vasanthi
- Honnavalli Krishna as Swamiji
- Mimicry Dayanand
- M. S. Umesh
- V. Manohar as himself (Guest Appearance)
- Sulochana Rai
- Guru Murthy
- Mysore Ramanand
- Sneha Eshwar as Sneha (Guest Appearance)

== Soundtrack ==
All the songs are composed and scored by Rajesh Ramanath. Almost all the songs are recomposed with the same tunes as in the original Tamil film composed by S. A. Rajkumar except the song "Om Namaha" which was reused from "Kaathoramai Kadhai" from Kannupadapoguthaiya also composed by Rajkumar.

Song title	Singer(s)	Lyrics
"Chitte Banthu Chitte"	S. P. Balasubrahmanyam	K. Kalyan
"Kamana Bille"	S. P. Balasubrahmanyam, K. S. Chithra	K. Kalyan
"Suryana Gelethanake"	S. P. Balasubrahmanyam, K. S. Chithra	K. Kalyan
"Ello Adu Ello"	S. P. Balasubrahmanyam	K. Kalyan
"Ello Adu Ello"	K. S. Chithra	K. Kalyan
"Koti Pallavi Haaduva"	K. S. Chithra	K. Kalyan
"Om Namaha"	S. P. Balasubrahmanyam, Manjula Gururaj	K. Kalyan

== Reception ==
Sify wrote "Ravichandran sleepwalks through the movie while it is Prema who steals the thunder. She has done a good job inspite (sic) of looking extremely beautiful. Mandya Ramesh also is good in the comedy track. But however it is the music in the film (which is a clean lift from the original sound track) which is the highlight". Indiainfo wrote "This Tamil remake of Unadethil Ennai Kuduthene starring Karthik and Roja has its dramatic moments but it's not worth raving about".
