= Brahmachari (1992 film) =

- Directed by: Muktha Srinivasan
- Screenplay by: Muktha Srinivasan
- Story by: Babu-Gopu
- Produced by: S. Ravi; R. Govind
- Starring: Nizhalgal Ravi; Gautami
- Cinematography: Muktha S. Sundar
- Edited by: P. Mohanraj
- Music by: Deva
- Production company: Muktha Films
- Release date: 15 January 1992
- Running time: 145 minutes
- Country: India
- Language: Tamil

Brahmachari (transl. Bachelor) is a 1992 Indian Tamil-language comedy film directed by Muktha Srinivasan in his last directorial venture. The film stars Nizhalgal Ravi and Gautami. It was released on 15 January 1992.

== Plot ==
Ganesan is a bachelor and wants to get married as soon as possible. Ganesan and his friend Panchavarnam look for the perfect bride. Later, Ganesan falls in love with Malathi at first sight. He follows her everywhere and even proposes his wish to marry her. At first, Malathi refuses but she then accepts his love. Malathi is from a rich family and her father Periya Thiruvadi only wants a rich groom, while Ganesan is a poor guy. There comes Ganesan's uncle from Dubai and the lovers think that he is rich. Knowing the news, Thiruvadi is urged to prepare their wedding. His uncle turns out to be a simple hairdresser in Dubai. Ganesan, Malathi and his uncle decide to maintain the lie until the end of the wedding. What transpires later forms the crux of the story.

== Cast ==
- Nizhalgal Ravi as Ganesan
- Gautami as Malathi
- Janagaraj as Ganesan's uncle
- Vennira Aadai Moorthy as Periya Thiruvadi, Malathi's father
- S. S. Chandran
- Charle as Panchavarnam
- Jai Ganesh as Thangaraj
- Manorama as Malathi's grandmother
- Sulakshana as Kokila
- Sangeetha
- Kumarimuthu as Muthu
- Kokila as Mary
- V. Gopalakrishnan as Gopal
- Oru Viral Krishna Rao
- Pasi Sathya
- Sivaraman
- Karuppu Subbiah

== Soundtrack ==
The soundtrack was composed by Deva.

Song	Singer(s)	Lyrics	Duration
"Naan Thaane Brahmachari"	Mano, Chorus	Vaali	4:13
"Love Hospital"	S. P. Balasubrahmanyam, Swarnalatha, Chorus	Vaali	4:41
"Thenkasi Thenai"	Mano, Swarnalatha	Vaali	4:26
"Vaigai Nathi Vellathile"	S. N. Surendar, Uma Ramanan	Vairamuthu	4:19
"Tamil Nadu Thaikulame"	Krishnaraj	Vaali	4:34
