= Ellaranthalla Nanna Ganda =

- A screenshot still from the film.
- Directed by: S. Umesh
- Written by: Ra Prakash Thrishuli (dialogues)
- Screenplay by: S. Umesh
- Story by: Ra Prakash Thrishuli
- Produced by: K. Prabhakar
- Starring: Vishnuvardhan; Prema; Umashree; Thara
- Cinematography: R. Giri
- Edited by: S. Umesh
- Music by: Upendra Kumar
- Production company: Vijay Films
- Distributed by: Vijay Films
- Release date: 29 April 1997
- Running time: 140 minutes
- Country: India
- Language: Kannada

Ellaranthalla Nanna Ganda (transl. My husband is unlike everyone) is a 1997 Indian Kannada film, directed by S. Umesh and produced by K. Prabhakar. The film stars Vishnuvardhan, Prema, Umashree and Tara in the lead roles. The film has musical score by Upendra Kumar.

== Plot ==
When Surya accuses Vishwa Prasad, a politician, of acquiring his position through political influence, Vishwa swears to destroy him.

== Cast ==
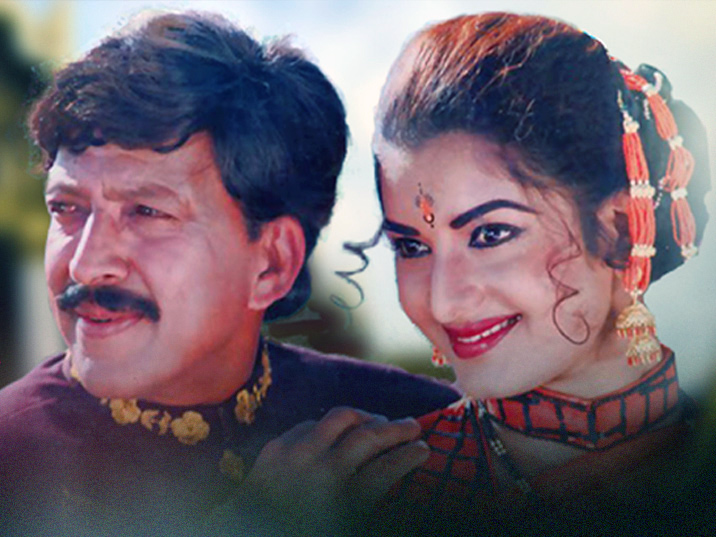
Vishnuvardhan, Prema in the film

- Vishnuvardhan as Surya
- Prema as Nethra
- Umashree as Surya's mother
- Tara
- Ashalatha as Lakshmi
- Girija Lokesh as Girija
- Jyothi
- Meena
- Doddanna as Shankarappa
- B. C. Patil as Vishwaprasad
- Loknath
- Lohithaswa
- Rajanand
- Sadashiva Brahmavar
- Kunigal Vasanth
- Krishne Gowda
- Suresh Sharma
- Ashok Babu
- Tennis Krishna
- Bank Janardhan
- Dingri Nagaraj as Broker Nagaraj
- Rathnakar
- Lakshman
- Sathyajith
- Bharath
- M. N. Vasudeva Rao
- Joe Simon as interviewer
- Kunigal Nagabhushan as interviewer
- Ramanjulu
- Ramamurthy
- Srishailan
- Shankar Bhat
- M. S. Karanth
- Vaijanath Biradar
- Master Anand
- Master Vinayaka Joshi
- Master Mohan
- Master Rakesh

== Soundtrack ==
Soundtrack was composed by Upendra Kumar.

- Janumada Neediruve - Dr. Rajkumar
- Baanigalla Obba - S. P. Balasubrahmanyam, K. S. Chithra
- Ee Hrudaya Dochi - S. P. Balasubrahmanyam, K. S. Chithra
- Kannadakkagi - S. P. Balasubrahmanyam
- Mohada Bombu - Vishnu, Manjula Gururaj

== Reception ==
Film critic Srikanth Srinivasa of Deccan Herald panned the film, termed it "[A]voidable" and wrote, "The film meanders through the first half. Though Prema looks stunning and beautiful, she is wasted in an inconsequential role. Vishnuvardhan definitely steals the show with his trimmed physique and pleasing screen presence. Umashri is adequate. B C Patil is boring." He added, "Director Umesh has failed to capitalise on Vishnu's immense acting prowess. Music Director Upendra Kumar has scored two melodious tunes which remain hummable only within the theatre hall."
