= Ethir Kaatru =

- Title card
- Directed by: Muktha S. Sundar
- Screenplay by: Muktha Srinivasan
- Story by: Subha
- Produced by: Muktha Srinivasan
- Starring: Karthik; Kanaka
- Cinematography: Mukta S. Sundar
- Edited by: P. Mohanraj
- Music by: Ilaiyaraaja
- Production company: Muktha Films
- Release date: 7 December 1990
- Running time: 140 minutes
- Country: India
- Language: Tamil

Ethir Kaatru (transl. Headwind) is a 1990 Indian Tamil-language thriller film, directed by Muktha S. Sundar and produced by Muktha Srinivasan. The film stars Karthik and Kanaka. It was released on 7 December 1990. The film is based on the Malayalam film Artham, which is in turn based on the Tamil novel Ethir Kaatru, written by Subha.

== Plot ==
Ram Narendran, a rich orphan youth, decides to end his life. Waiting on the railway track, he sees another man there who tries to jump on the railway track and Ram Narendran saves him. This person is Jana, he lives with his parents and his little sister Geetha. Jana was a jobless youth and he got a job as a manager in a chit fund company with the help of Madhavan, a family friend, and paid a big amount to join the company. Later, the company ripped off his clients; Madhavan cheated him. The clients threatened the innocent Jana and they put pressure on him to pay them back. Angered, Jana killed Madhavan, so he decides to commit suicide.

Ram Narendran decides to surrender instead of him and goes to the jail voluntarily. Jana has a guilty conscience and he appoints S. Chandrasekaran, a lawyer, to bail Narendran out of jail. However, Ram Narendran would rather sacrifice his life without goals than Jana's life. Later, Jana meets Devaraj, the chit fund company's head, and his partners: Maasi, a politician's cousin, and a police officer's son. Jana challenges Devaraj to punish them. The next day, Jana's dead body is found on a railway track.

Chandrasekaran publishes Ram Narendran's book and it turns out to be a huge success. Anita, a journalist, tries to meet him. Anita and S. Chandrasekaran bail Ram Narendran out of jail. Ram Narendran cannot accept that Jana committed suicide, so Anita and Ram Narendran start to investigate Jana's mysterious death.

== Cast ==
- Karthik as Ram Narendran
- Kanaka as Journalist Anita
- Anand Babu as Jana (Janardan)
- V. K. Ramasamy as Advocate S. Chandrasekaran
- Chithra as Geetha, Jana's sister
- Anandaraj as Devaraj, Owner of Chit Fund Company
- Livingston as Maasi, Brother in law of a minister
- Crazy Venkatesh as son of DSP and an acquaintance of Maasi and Devaraj
- Manorama as the landlady of S. Chandrasekaran
- Ra. Sankaran as Jana's father
- M. N. Rajam as Jana's mother
- Vathiyar Raman as Francis
- Vennira Aadai Moorthy
- V. Gopalakrishnan
- Oru Viral Krishna Rao
- Santhana Bharathi as Minister Azhagesan
- Delhi Ganesh as Sundaramoorthy, Anita's editor
- Kavithalayaa Krishnan as Kamala Kannan (KK)
- LIC Narasimhan
- K. Natraj as Anita's Newspaper company owner
- Writer S. Ramakrishnan in one scene.

== Soundtrack ==
The music was composed by Ilaiyaraaja.

Song	Singer(s)	Lyrics	Duration
"Ingu Irukkum"	Uma Ramanan	Vaali	4:56
"Koondai Vittu"	K. J. Yesudas	Vaali	4:43
"Nee Ulla Poranthu"	Malaysia Vasudevan	Ilaiyaraaja	4:48
"Raja Illa"	Arunmozhi, Uma Ramanan	Vaali	4:57
"Saamiyaaraa Ponavanukku"	Ilaiyaraaja	Ilaiyaraaja	4:25
