= Chinna Chinna Aasaigal =

- Title card
- Directed by: Muktha S. Sundar
- Screenplay by: Muktha Srinivasan
- Story by: Gopu–Babu
- Produced by: Muktha Srinivasan
- Starring: Pandiarajan; Malashri
- Cinematography: Muktha S. Sundar
- Edited by: P. Mohanraj
- Music by: Chandrabose
- Production company: Muktha Films
- Release date: 15 December 1989
- Country: India
- Language: Tamil

Chinna Chinna Aasaigal (transl. Small Desires) is a 1989 Indian Tamil-language comedy film directed by Muktha S. Sundar, starring Pandiarajan and Malashri. The film was released on 15 December 1989.

== Cast ==
- Pandiarajan
- Rasika
- S. S. Chandran
- Vijayakumar
- Vinu Chakravarthy
- Maadhu Balaji
- Chinni Jayanth

== Soundtrack ==
The music was composed by Chandrabose.

Track listing
No.	Title	Lyrics	Singer(s)	Length
1.	"O Meghame"	Pulamaipithan	K. J. Yesudas, Lalitha Sagari	4:22
2.	"Akka Maga"	Muthulingham	Vani Jairam	4:02
3.	"Aadungamma"	Na. Kamarasan	Malaysia Vasudevan, Chandrabose, T. Thyagarajan	3:56
4.	"Ilayavale"	Mu. Metha	K. S. Chithra	3:41
5.	"Anbu Nanbane"	Ponnadiyan	Mano	4:07

== Reception ==
P. S. S. of Kalki praised the film's humour, cinematography and dialogues.
