= Kodai Mazhai =

1986 film by Muktha S. Sundar

- Title card
- Directed by: Muktha S. Sundar
- Screenplay by: Muktha Srinivasan
- Story by: Muktha Sundar
- Produced by: V. Ramasami
- Starring: Vidhyashree; Lakshmi; Jaishankar; Sripriya
- Cinematography: Gajendramani
- Edited by: V. P. Krishnan; C. R. Shanmugam
- Music by: Ilaiyaraaja
- Production company: Muktha Films
- Release date: 26 September 1986
- Country: India
- Language: Tamil

Kodai Mazhai (pronounced [koːɖaɪ maɻaɪ] transl. Summer Rain) is a 1986 Indian Tamil-language film, directed by Muktha S. Sundar and produced by V. Ramasami. The film stars Vidhyasree, with Lakshmi, Jaishankar and Sripriya in supporting roles. It was released on 26 September 1986.

== Cast ==
- Sunitha as Vidhya
- Lakshmi
- Jaishankar
- Sripriya
- Prasad
- Manorama
- Loose Mohan
- S. Ve. Sekhar
- Senthil
- Thengai Srinivasan
- Amala
- Bhagyaraj
- Saritha
- Charle
- Master Nagesh
- Baby Vijayapriya
- Rajinikanth in a guest appearance

== Production ==
Kodai Mazhai, the directorial debut of Muktha S. Sundar, was one of the earliest South Indian films to have scenes shot in low light, following the introduction of high-speed negative film in India the mid-1980s. It was the feature film debut of Sunitha, who later became known as "Kodai Mazhai Vidya". The dialogues were written by Komal Swaminathan. Some scenes were shot at Ooty.

== Soundtrack ==
Soundtrack was composed by Ilaiyaraaja. The song "Kaatrodu Kuzhalin" is set in Simhendramadhyamam raga.

Song	Singers	Lyrics
"Kaatrodu Kuzhalin"	K. S. Chithra	Pulamaipithan
"Pala Pala"	Uma Ramanan, Devie Neithiyar	Mu. Metha
"Thenthoongum"	S. Janaki	Vaali
"Thuppakki Kaiyil"	Ilaiyaraaja	Na. Kamarasan

== Release and reception ==
Kodai Mazhai was released on 26 September 1986. Jayamanmadhan of Kalki wrote there have already been films in Tamil about vibrant artistes with dreams in their eyes and dancing on their feet, but without mixing love and lust is what makes the film special.
