= Kraurya =

- ಕ್ರೌರ್ಯ
- Directed by: Girish Kasaravalli
- Written by: T. N. Seetharam
- Screenplay by: Girish Kasaravalli
- Produced by: Nirmala Chitagopi
- Starring: Renukamma Murugodu; Girish Kasaravalli; Vishwas; H. G. Dattatreya; T. V. Gurumurthy
- Cinematography: S. Ramachandra
- Edited by: M. N. Swamy
- Music by: L. Vaidyanathan
- Production company: Nirmala Chithra
- Release date: 20 September 1996
- Running time: 118 minutes
- Country: India
- Language: Kannada

Kraurya (transl. Cruelty) is a 1996 Indian Kannada language drama film directed by Girish Kasaravalli, based on a story written by T. N. Seetharam about an old woman who has to deal with complex relationships with people of different generations she is put up with. The title in Kannada literally means "cruelty". The cast includes Renukamma Murugodu in the lead role as Rangajji, and supporting roles played by Vishwas, H. G. Dattatreya and T. V. Gurumurthy.

The film won two awards at the 43rd National Film Awards - Best Feature Film in Kannada and Best Child Artist (Vishwas).

== Plot ==
Kraurya is the story of Rangajji, a widow who loves to tell stories of fantasy to the children of her village. Rangajji's hardships start when her only son dies young mysteriously. Rangajji goes to live with a distant relative of hers, only to receive a cold welcome. Life goes on endlessly for Rangajji. She longs to tell stories to children, but her freedom is severely restricted. While she spends every day in boredom, Murty the youngest son of the family becomes close to Rangajji. Rangajji feels a new lease of life when the eldest son of the family Subbanna decides to go to Bangalore to start his own private business. Rangajji lends the money Subbanna needs, thinking that Subbanna might help her find her husband's close friend Mr. Padmanabiah in Bangalore. Subbanna leaves for Bangalore. After a few months Rangajji leaves for Bangalore along with Murty only to receive another cold welcome from Subbanna. She tries to find Mr. Padmanabiah with Murty's help. When her search ends, she discovers that Mr. Padmanabiah is no more. She feels hopeless and loses her will to live. Murty decides to return her to the village. But a spate of events during the journey back to the village leaves Rangajji physically wounded. Murty tries to take control of the situation, but fails. The climax of the film shows Rangajji in an unconscious state lying in the police station, while Murty, afraid that the police might arrest him for murder, escapes.

== Cast ==
- Renukamma Murugodu as Rangajji
- Master Vishwas
- H. G. Dattatreya
- T. V. Gurumurthy
- Ashok Hegde
- Vijaya Ekkundi
- Swathi, Roopa
- Srinivasa Meshtru
- Srinivasa Thavarekere
- Jerry Anantharam
- Vishweshwara Surapura
- Rajanna
- Sadananda Bhat
- M. N. Suresh
- Manjunath
- Munishyamappa

== The inner theme ==
"Kraurya" is a Kannada word meaning "cruelty". The story and the film deal with the violence of the human mind. The protagonist is a victim of such violence. Girish Kasaravalli contemplates on how humans can wreck other's lives by displaying behaviour that lacks humanitarian consideration. We know that we can hurt another person in some or the other way. But we still say it. That we know it is just a fact, never a reality. Kraurya effectively showcases this. Sometimes, cruelty of the mind is far more penetrating than cruelty in the physical form. The former has immense potential to delve deep into human mind and leave the person devastated for the rest of his life, never to rise again. We witness all these through the film. The metamorphosis of Rangajji from a woman bubbling with life and enthusiasm to a lonely woman waiting to die effectively showcases the power and notoriety of human mind.

== Highlights ==
- The sudden transition in the life of the protagonist was well picturised and creates a lasting impression on the audiences. The scene shows Rangajji visiting a watch shop during her search. It is here when she learns of her husband's friend's death. Unable to believe it, she rejects the fact that Mr.Padmanabiah has died. The person in the shop shows her reflection in the mirror and says that if she could be so old, Mr.Padmanabiah can be dead too. Rangajji for the first time looks at herself in the mirror like she had never looked before. She feels her grey hair, her toothless mouth, the wrinkles of her face... She realises that she is very old too and maybe her death is nearing. It is just this one realization that transforms her. She no longer desires to live and just waits in darkness for death.
- The climax, like in all of Girish Kasaravalli's films was a major highlight. Rangajji is lying in a police station. She is in a place where nobody knows her. She is aware of nothing as she is unconscious. Murty tries his best to revive her. When the police realize that the old woman may die any moment, they threaten Murty that if something happens to Rangajji, they will arrest him. Murty tries to wake up Rangajji, but she just lies motionless on the ground. In a moment of desperation, fear and hopelessness, Murty runs away from the police station to never return again.

== Actors and performances ==
Renukamma Murugodu as Rangajji delivered a world class performance in the film. Kraurya was the most memorable actress from the film . Master Vishwas as Murty won a national award for his role. The film also featured senior artistes like H.G.Dattatreya and Mr. Gurumurty.

== Awards and screenings ==
- Kraurya won the silver lotus award for the best Kannada film of the year.
- Master Vishwas won the National award for the Best child artist.
- It also won the Karnataka state award for the second best film.
- Kraurya was screened at the Hong Kong International Film Festival.
