= Naveen Mayur =

Indian Kannada actor

- Born: 25 November 1978
- Died: 3 October 2010 (aged 31); Bangalore, Karnataka, India
- Other name: Naveen Mayoor
- Occupation: Actor

Naveen Mayur (25 November 1978 – 3 October 2010) was an Indian actor who was known for his work in Kannada cinema. He appeared in more than 30 films starting 2000 before he died of jaundice in 2010.

== Early life ==
Mayur was born on 25 November 1978. He completed his primary education from Sri Kumaran's School, Bangalore. Later, he joined National High School and subsequently the Sri Bhagawan Mahaveer Jain College where he obtained a degree in Bachelor of Business Management. Mayur began modeling later and was one of 25 models selected from South India for the Regional Scanning of Graviera Mr. India in 1997, but was disqualified because he was under-age to contest. He was subsequently introduced to film director Sunil Kumar Desai, who cast him in his first film, Sparsha.

== Career ==
Mayur began acting when in college and performed in plays such as Naanu Neenu. After his film debut with Sparsha, he was cast in T. S. Nagabharana's Neela.

Mayur was cast as the college-going Kiran in Ananda (2003), a remake of the 2001 Telugu-language film Anandam, opposite Rutika. Srikanth of Deccan Herald wrote of his performance: "Naveen Mayur has come of age. He exudes confidence in his role and shows some excitement on the screen for the youngsters of his age." Mayur received praise for his role of a cancer patient in Uppi Dada M.B.B.S.. R. G. Vijayasarathy of Rediff.com felt that he "comes out with flying colours..."

Mayur also worked in television; he appeared in the popular soap, Danda Pindagalu.

== Death ==
On 3 October 2010, Mayur died of jaundice at the age of 32.

== Filmography ==
Year	Title	Role	Note(s)	Ref.
2000	Sparsha	Ramesh		
2001	Neela	Karthik		
2002	Parva			
2002	Preethi Mado Hudugarigella	Siddharth		
2002	Ninagoskara	Jay		
2002	Love Lovike			
2003	Neenandre Ishta			
2003	Ananda	Kiran		
2003	Ramaswamy Krishnaswamy			
2003	Hello			
2004	Poorvapara	Sunder		
2004	Nalla	Srikanth		
2005	Ranachandi			
2006	Uppi Dada M.B.B.S.	A patient		
2006	Nan Hendthi Kole	Ajay		
2006	Avnandre Avne			
2006	Autograph Please			
2007	Hosa Varsha			
