= Jamindaarru =

- Directed by: S. Narayan
- Written by: S. Narayan
- Produced by: K. Manju
- Starring: Vishnuvardhan; Prema; Raasi; Hema Choudhary
- Cinematography: Mathew
- Edited by: P. R. Soundar Raj
- Music by: M. M. Keeravani; Sax Raju (background score)
- Production company: Lakshmishree Combines
- Release date: 3 April 2002
- Running time: 160 min
- Country: India
- Language: Kannada

Jamindaarru (transl. Zamindar) is a 2002 Indian Kannada-language action drama film written and directed by S. Narayan and starring Vishnuvardhan in dual roles, Prema and Raasi. The film is produced by K. Manju under Lakshmishree Combines. The film, upon release, met with positive reviews. The music was scored by M. M. Keeravani and Sax Raju.

== Plot ==
The Landlord of a village has 2 sons from 2 different wives. One of the wives demands that she and her son get the status of heir but the landlord denies. That wife kills herself and her son keeps this incident in mind and lives away from father and his brother with bitterness and vengeance. The Film revolves around how two brothers and their respective family menuvar the enimity and circumstances and who gets to become the heir.

== Cast ==
- Vishnuvardhan as
  - Bettappa, elder brother
  - Biligiri, younger brother
- Prema as Ganga
- Raasi
- Anu Prabhakar as Anusuya
- Srinivasa Murthy as Bettappa and Biligiri's father
- Hema Choudhary as Biligiri's Aunty
- Shivaram as Gangs's father
- Sundar Raj as Bettappa's maternal uncle
- Doddanna as Bettappa's aide
- Mukhyamantri Chandru as Bellary Naga
- Ashalatha as Bettappa's mother (Special Appearance)
- Shobaraj

== Production ==
The film began with a song recording held at Kanteerava Studios. Producer K. Manju claimed that Jamindarru was his costliest film at the time of release. The scenes were shot in a home situated at Dr. Ramanaidu Village on Hyderabad.

== Soundtrack ==
All the songs are composed and scored by M. M. Keeravani.

Sl No	Song title	Singer(s)	Lyricist
1	"Bettappa Bettappa"	S. P. Balasubrahmanyam	S. Narayan
2	"Huduga Huduga"	Mano, K. S. Chithra, M. M. Keeravani	S. Narayan
3	"Kande Na Kande"	K. S. Chithra	S. Narayan
4	"Ganga Ganga"	Rajesh Krishnan, Manjula Gururaj	S. Narayan
5	"Bettadantha Manasu"	M. M. Keeravani	S. Narayan
6	"Hetthavalu Yaramma"	M. M. Keeravani	S. Narayan
7	"Veena"	K. S. Chithra	S. Narayan

== Release and reception ==
The film was released on 3 April 2002 across Karnataka state cinema halls. The film was met with positive response at the box office and was one of the highest grossing Kannada film of the year.

A critic from Chitraloka.com wrote that "‘Jamindarru’ is not a dry Jamoon. It is a spicily prepared sumptuous lunch for the whole family. Don't miss this power packed, sentiment mixed and well acted film". A critic from Vishnuvardhan.com praised the acting, dialogues, cinematography, songs and graphics while criticising the background score and direction. Indiainfo wrote "The whole story is well held up by the dialogues except for Doddanna and M. M. Chandru's poor jokes. Songs are not memorable. Mathews photography has gobbled up either Vishnu's forehead or his arms. The major plus point in this movie is that S. Narayan is not acting in it. All said and done a watchable movie".
