= Balarama (film) =

- Directed by: S. Mahendar
- Written by: B. A. Madhu (dialogue)
- Screenplay by: S. Mahendar
- Story by: M. V. S. Haranatha Rao
- Based on: Yerra Mandaram (1991)
- Produced by: Ramesh Yadav
- Starring: Rockline Venkatesh; Prema
- Cinematography: A. C. Mahendra
- Edited by: P. R. Sounder Rajan
- Music by: Hamsalekha
- Production company: Royal Pictures
- Release date: 2 August 2002
- Country: India
- Language: Kannada

Balarama is a 2002 Indian Kannada-language film directed by S. Mahendar and produced by Ramesh Yadav. The film stars Rockline Venkatesh and Prema. It is a remake of the 1991 Telugu film Yerra Mandaram (1991). The film revolves around a criminal who, after committing a series of crimes, traps an innocent politician in his vicious web. Soon, the politician's wife sets out to exact revenge. The film was a box office flop.

== Plot ==
Balarama is an uneducated and innocent person working in a theatre. Sevanthi loves Balarama and marries him. Due to allegations of corruption, Saahukaar Durgappa, the incumbent President of Mandal Panchayat, is barred from contesting elections. Hence, Saahukaar decides to make Balarama as the President since he is innocent and can be made a puppet in his hands. However, Balarama wants to reform his village but is left helpless as he lacks courage. Later one day, he feels ashamed of himself for being so powerless and unable to stop the crimes committed by Saahukaar. He revolts against this which results in his arrest with false accusations and is killed by Saahukaar's men after he returns from the police station. The police take Saahukaar's side and close the case, reporting that the person killed was someone other than Balarama. Finally, Saahukaar is then murdered by Sevanthi and her son, both of whom allege that the murder was committed by Balarama who is still said to be alive by the police. The movie ends with Sevanthi and her son walking free.

== Cast ==
- Rockline Venkatesh as Balarama
- Prema as Sevanthi
- Avinash as Saahukaar Durgappa
- Doddanna
- Shobaraj
- Shivaram
- C. R. Simha
- Karibasavaiah
- Tara
- Kishori Ballal
- Renuka Prasad

== Music ==
The music was composed by Hamsalekha, who also penned lyrics for all the six songs.

Track listing
No.	Title	Singer(s)	Length
1.	"Badava Ninna Kopa"	S. Mahendar
2.	"Chairmenre Chairmenre"	Rajesh Krishnan, Latha Hamsalekha, Hamsalekha
3.	"Entha Chenda Nodi"	Rajesh Krishnan, Sangeetha
4.	"Onti Henna"	S. P. Balasubrahmanyam, B. Jayashree
5.	"Rama Balarama"	Rajesh Krishnan
6.	"Seere Utta Singaari"	Rajesh Krishnan, Divya Raghavan

== Reception ==
A critic from indiainfo.com wrote that "Though it has all the characteristics of parallel cinema, it is overwhelming with commercial aspects. Still one can feel the beautiful blend of comedy, song and sentiments". A critic from Viggy wrote that "Director Mahendar succeeded in not making the film look like photocopy of its original film 'Erra Mandaram'. With his consecutive success of remake films Vaali, Ninagagi and Balarama Mahendar now is a hatric[k] director".
