= Parva (film) =

2002 Indian Kannadafilm directed and written by Sunil Kumar Desai

- VCD cover
- Directed by: Sunil Kumar Desai
- Written by: Sunil Kumar Desai
- Produced by: H. C. Srinivas
- Starring: Vishnuvardhan; Prema
- Cinematography: H. C. Venu
- Edited by: R. Janardhan; T. Govardhan
- Music by: Hamsalekha
- Production company: Srinivasa Productions
- Release date: 18 January 2002
- Running time: 157 minutes
- Country: India
- Language: Kannada

Parva is a 2002 Indian Kannada-language musical drama film directed and written by Sunil Kumar Desai and produced by H. C. Srinivas. The film stars Vishnuvardhan along with Prema and Roja in prominent roles. The music was written, scored and produced by Hamsalekha.

The film released on 18 January 2002 to generally positive reviews from critics, but proved to be a commercial failure. This is one of the rare movies in Kannada cinema history. The movie starts with a song and also ends with a song and dance. This is probably the first time in Kannada cinema where the director uses a song to complete the climax for the movie.

== Plot ==
Sagar (Vishnuvardhan) is a good singer and dancer. He starts searching for Suma (Prema) in a huge crowd. When the crowd starts wondering why is he looking for her commences the first flashback, which is one among the seven or so flashbacks in the movie.

Sagar is a nice guy who has taken up drinking due to failure in his love life. Suma lands at Sagar's place to learn Bharathanatyam from his father, who is an expert. She tries to find out why Sagar has stopped singing. This leads to another flashback where Sagar explains as to how he was ditched by Sudha (Roja) and also narrates how he lost his mother. This forced him to stop singing and take up drinking. Sagar finally takes up singing after much persuasion from Suma and returns to the singing family. He also agrees to give a comeback show, but insists on Suma's presence in that show. Suma never turns up for the show. Here begins the search for her. He sets a deadline through a TV performance to Suma.

Suma turns up to Sagar's place and this leads to another flashback where she narrates as to why she couldn't attend the performance a year back. Bhattacharya is a very good singer. He and Suma's father (Dattatreya) have an argument because Bhattacharya's father insisted on his daughter winning the competition and forces him to go for a particular raga. This irritates Suma's father and he leaves the huge hall in a rage. He meets with an accident and dies. Bhattacharya insists on Suma not attending Sagar's performance as that will harm the growth of his daughter's image and that's the reason Suma doesn't turn up to Sagar's show (all this was a flashback). The rest of the movie is about the clash between Sagar and Bhattacharya. This leads to the climax song which is of 11–13 minutes duration and how he defeats Bhattacharya in a competition.

== Cast ==
- Vishnuvardhan as Sagar
- Prema as Suma
- Roja as Sudha (Extended Special Appearance)
- Keremane Shivarama Hegde as Shastri
- Radha Ravi as Bhattacharya
- Ramesh Bhat as Shivaya
- Sparsha Rekha as Rekha
- Bhavana as Shanthala
- Naveen Mayur as Peter
- Sanketh Kashi as Kashi
- Mandeep Roy
- Arun Sagar as Shivamani
- Kishori Ballal as Gayathri (Guest Appearance)
- H. G. Dattatreya as Appanna Pandit (Guest Appearance)
- Aparna Vaidyanathan
- Renukamma Murgod
- Amulya (credited as Baby Amulya)

== Production ==
Director Sunil Kumar Desai conceived the film as a multi-dimensional narrative that would juxtapose flashback sequences with linear storytelling. He stated that there are "different shades" to their characterisation of the leading pair. Vishnuvardhan was cast as a singer and showman, and Prema as a classical dancer, opposite him. Roja Selvamani was cast as the second female lead, while Mandeep Roy and Sanketh Kashi were signed to play supporting roles.

Yakshagana exponent Shambu Hegde was cast to play the father of Vishnuvardhan's character. Making his first screen appearance, he stated, "I was reluctant to accept the cinema offer because this is an unknown territory to me. Cinema and camera are all new to me. Film shooting is a new experience. Desai offered me the role of a dance teacher and a father. He insisted that I play this role which involves a lot of complexities concerned with the rhythm, pitch and musical beat that go into the character. I have entrusted the entire responsibility of saving my honour at the hands of Sunil Kumar Desai. This is not only a test for me but it is the same for the director."

It was reported that film had four dance choreographers – Ganesh Hegde, Tara, Bhanumati Rao, Chandra Mayur and Shivanand, with distinct styles. The reported added that filming would take place in Kalasa, Kudremukh, Maravanthe, Ooty, Madikeri and Bangalore.

== Soundtrack ==
The music of the film was composed and the lyrics written by Hamsalekha. It was earlier rumored that singer Lata Mangeshkar would sing a song in the film. However, it turned out to be a mere gossip. The Music Magazine wrote "Compared to Sandhyaraga, Hamsageete or even Upasane, the songs here do not make a huge impression. Hamsalekha is best at wit and street language, and while Parva has some interesting patches, a classical dance and music-oriented film like this perhaps calls for a different set of skills".

Parva

Soundtrack album by Hamsalekha
- Released: 2001
- Genre: Feature film soundtrack
- Label: Akash Audio

No.	Title	Lyrics	Singer(s)	Length
1.	"Pallavi Thane Haadina"	Hamsalekha	S. P. Balasubrahmanyam, K. S. Chitra
2.	"Ee Parva"	Hamsalekha	Divya Raghavan
3.	"Ee Parva Bhavasagara"	Hamsalekha	S. P. Balasubrahmanyam, Mano, Nanditha, Divya Raghavan
4.	"O Nanna Spoorthiye"	Hamsalekha	S. P. Balasubrahmanyam
5.	"Sadhane Paramapada"	Hamsalekha	S. P. Balasubrahmanyam, K. S. Chitra
6.	"Antharanga Aasegala"	Hamsalekha	Divya Raghavan, Udit Narayan
7.	"Elli Hode"	Hamsalekha	Hariharan, Nagachandrika
8.	"Dolu Dolu Dangura"	Hamsalekha	Udit Narayan

== Reception ==
Sify wrote "Parva is a non-stop dance party, which becomes tedious and boring. Director Sunilkumar Desai, had made action thrillers in the past but following the success of his love story Nammoora Mandara Hoove he has now changed track to love stories. But Desai fails in his attempt to portray various dimensions of love. He ends up borrowing bits and shards of films like Hum Kissise Kum Nahi, Hum Dil De Chuke Sanam, Taal and other Bollywood musicals". A critic from Chitraloka.com wrote, "This is a film little lengthy but all the way worth watching".

== Awards ==
- Karnataka State Film Award for Best Supporting Actor - Keremane Shambhu Hegde

== External source ==
- movie review
