= Savyasachi (1995 film) =

- Theatrical release poster
- Directed by: M. S. Rajashekar
- Written by: T. N. Narasimhan
- Based on: Vijay Sasanur's novel
- Produced by: R. Niveditha; N. Prema
- Starring: Shiva Rajkumar; Prema
- Cinematography: Mallikarjuna
- Edited by: P. Bhaktavatsalam
- Music by: Sadhu Kokila
- Production company: Shashvathi Chitra
- Release date: 21 April 1995
- Running time: 140 minutes
- Country: India
- Language: Kannada

Savyasachi (transl. Ambidextrous) is a 1995 Indian Kannada-language action drama film directed by M. S. Rajashekar and adapted from a novel of same name by Vijay Sasanur. The film stars Shiva Rajkumar and Prema in her debut. The soundtrack and background score was composed by Sadhu Kokila.

== Synopsis ==
Akhilesh is a CBI officer who sets out to find Keshavani in order to avenge his father's death and thwart his attempts to sell the country's military secrets for his profits.

== Cast ==
- Shiva Rajkumar as Akhilesh
- Prema as Radha
- Charithra
- Thoogudeepa Srinivas
- Malathi
- Tej Sapru as Keshwani
- Avinash as Dr. Delta
- Shivaram
- Pruthviraj
- Ravikiran
- H. G. Dattatreya

== Soundtrack ==
The soundtrack of the film was composed by Sadhu Kokila.

Track listing
No.	Title	Lyrics	Singer(s)	Length
1.	"Changulabi Thotadalli"	Sriranga	S. P. Balasubrahmanyam& K. S. Chithra
2.	"Raja Rani Naavilokake"	Hamsalekha	S. P. Balasubrahmanyam & K. S. Chithra
3.	"Namma Madhuchandra"	Sriranga	S. P. Balasubrahmanyam & K. S. Chithra
4.	"Naagara Haave"	Hamsalekha	S. P. Balasubrahmanyam, K. S. Chithra, Rajesh Krishnan & Mangala
5.	"Ee Hrudayada Haadu"	M. N. Vyasa Rao	Manjula Gururaj
