= Yerra Mandaram =

- Movie Poster
- Directed by: Muthyala Subbaiah
- Screenplay by: Pokuri Babu Rao; Sanjeevi
- Story by: M. V. S. Haranatha Rao
- Produced by: Pokuri Venkateswara Rao
- Starring: Rajendra Prasad; Yamuna
- Cinematography: R.Rama Rao
- Edited by: Gautham Raju
- Music by: Chakravarthy
- Production company: Eetharam Films
- Release date: 25 January 1991
- Running time: 155 minutes
- Country: India
- Language: Telugu

Yerra Mandaram (transl. Red Hibiscus) is a 1991 Indian Telugu-language revolutionary film directed by Muthyala Subbaiah. Produced by Pokuri Venkateswara Rao on Eetharam Films banner, the film stars Rajendra Prasad and Yamuna with music composed by Chakravarthy. The entire film was shot in a remote village. The film was remade in Tamil as Puthiya Parasakthi (1996) and in Kannada as Balarama (2002). The film won four Nandi Awards.

== Cast ==
- Yamuna as Arundhati
- Rajendra Prasad as Ramudu
- Devaraj as Degala Jagganna Dora
- P. L. Narayana as Babai, Retired Army Soldier
- Sakshi Ranga Rao as Poojari
- Narra Venkateswara Rao as Posukolu
- Sanjeevi as Nasa
- Jayalalita as Kotamma
- Sailaja as Jagganna Dora's wife

== Music ==
Erra Mandaram

Film score by Chakravarthy
- Released: 1991
- Genre: Soundtrack
- Length: 18:36
- Label: Cauvery Audio
- Producer: Chakravarthy

Chakravarthy chronology
| Amma Rajinama (1991) | Erra Mandaram (1991) | Talli Tandrulu (1991) |

Music was composed by Chakravarthy. Audio soundtrack was released on Cauvery Audio Company label.

| S. No | Song title | lyrics | Singers | length |
|---|---|---|---|---|
| 1 | "Yendi Bullemma" | Jaladi | S. P. Balasubrahmanyam, Chitra | 4:22 |
| 2 | "Kadu Kadu Antava" | Adrusta Deepak | Vandemataram Srinivas | 4:21 |
| 3 | "Yalo Yalo Ooyala" | Jaladi | Raja, Chitra | 5:10 |
| 4 | "Randayyo Jejelu" | Sirivennela Sitarama Sastry | S. P. Balasubrahmanyam, S. P. Sailaja | 4:43 |

== Awards ==
Nandi Awards

- Best Feature Film - Gold - P. Venkateswara Rao
- Best Actor - Rajendra Prasad
- Best Villain - Devaraj
- Best Lyricist - Jaladi Raja Rao
