= Kotiganahalli Ramaiah =

Indian politician

- Born: Ramaiah; 1954 (age 70–71); Kotiganahalli, Kolar, Karnataka, India
- Occupations: poet; activist; theatre activist; playwright

Kotiganahalli Ramaiah (born c. 1954) is a Dalit poet, playwright, philosopher and cultural activist from Karnataka, India. He is one of the founders of Aadima, an institution that experiments with children's theatre, film, education and caste consciousness.

He was an Aam Aadmi Party candidate for Kolar Lok Sabha constituency in the 2014 Indian general election.

== Early life and career ==
Ramaiah was born in the village of Kotiganahalli in Kolar district, Karnataka. He quit college, before completing a degree, to join the Dalit Sangharsha Samiti, a political group that spearheaded the struggle against caste discrimination and fought to acquire land rights for the former untouchables castes in Karnataka. He rose to be an instrumental figure in the Dalit movement where his contribution is most remembered for the numerous songs of resistance and struggles penned by him, some of which were adapted from the political climate of the left movement in Andhra Pradesh, particularly those by the revolutionary poet Gaddar. During this period Ramaiah also worked as a journalist with Lankesh Patrike, Mungaru and Suggi Sangati; and as a screenplay writer for numerous Kannada films and television serials.

== Founding of Aadima ==
Disillusioned with what he perceived as a lack of direction within the Dalit movement, as well as the rapid erasure of the inclusive foundations of the modern Indian state, Ramaiah and a few others within the movement envisioned a broad-based cultural response to address the roots of social exclusion in India. They saved a rupee a day for many years towards the establishment of Aadima, an experimental space that aims to temper the overarching need for political modernity with an understanding of the history of cultural resistance and the philosophical meaning systems that evolved as a response to centuries of marginalisation. Aadima was founded in 2005, adjoining Shivagange Village on the Anthargange Hill Range. Since then, Aadima has been researching and documenting oral traditions and narratives, creating plays and films and, experimenting in educational pedagogy with numerous communities that live in the Anthargange Hill Range. Aadima also plays host to Hunimme Haadu, an event on full moon nights that features plays from across Karnataka.

== Awards ==
- (2005) Karnataka Rajyotsava Award
- (2012) Karnataka Sahitya Akademy Award
- (2012) Suvarna Ranga Samman – Kannada Sangha Kanthavara

== Works ==
=== Plays ===
- Kaage Kannu Irve Bala
- Nayi Thippa
- Ratnapaksi
- Kannaspatre Quenalli Jagadambe
- Hakki Hadu
- Vogatina Rani
- Sum Sumke
- Darb Bar Buddanna
- Marjina Mattu Nalavattu Jana Kallaru
- Kattale Rajya

=== Published works ===
- Kaage Kannu Irve Bala (2012)
- No Alphabet in Sight: New Dalit Writing from South India, Dossier 2 – Editors – Susie Tharu and K. Satyanarayana (Forthcoming 2012)
- Sindh Madigara Samskruti (1993)
