= S. P. Varadappa =

Indian film producer and actor

- Born: Singanalluru Puttaswamayya Varadaraj; 1935; Gajanur, Madras Presidency, British India
- Died: 8 February 2006 (aged 70–71); Bangalore, India
- Other name: Varadappa
- Occupations: Film producer, actor
- Family: Rajkumar (brother); Sharadamma (sister)

Singanalluru Puttaswamayya Varadaraj (also known as S. P. Varadappa, (Note: "appa" is a respectful term of address for elders in India.) 1935 – 8 February 2006) was an Indian actor and producer in Kannada cinema. He produced films such as Bhootayyana Maga Ayyu starring Lokesh, and Hemavathi starring Udaykumar.

He was an architect in shaping up Sri Vajreshwari Combines, one of the most successful banners in the Kannada film industry, under which his sister-in-law Parvathamma Rajkumar produced films starring her husband Rajkumar, and his sons Shiv RajKumar, Raghavendra Rajkumar, and Puneeth Rajkumar.

== Biography ==
He was born at Gajanur – situated in the Karnataka–Tamil Nadu border – to Singanalluru Puttaswamayya, a theatre-artist, and Lakshmamma as a third child; Rajkumar, a Kannada film icon, is his elder brother while Sharadamma and Nagamma are his sisters.

He began his career as an actor part of Gubbi company (drama troupe) along with his father, elder brother – S.P. Muthuraj – popularly known as Rajkumar – and his younger sister. Later, he acted in couple of movies as a child artist in Makaranda and Krishnaleela. As an adult, he played minor roles in Kannada movies such as Sarvagnamoorthy released in 1965, Satishakti, and Dharma Vijaya released in 1959, in which his brother Rajkumar played a lead role. He produced Bhootayyana Maga Aiyyu and Hemavathi movies along with his friend – Chandulal Jain.

He died at an age of 71 in Bangalore due to heart ailment on 8 February 2006. An award on his name S.P. Varadaraju Awards has been instituted to honour the theatre personalities annually.

== See also ==
- Rajkumar filmography
- Kannada films of the 1950s
