= Arjun Sarja filmography =

Filmography for Arjun Sarja

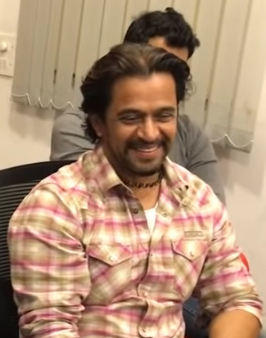
Sarja in 2019

Arjun Sarja is an Indian actor, producer and director who works predominantly in Tamil cinema and Kannada. He also established his career in Telugu cinema apart from a few Hindi and Malayalam films. He debuted as an actor in the film Simhada Mari Sainya in Kannada in the year 1981. Sarja had acted in more than 165 movies. He has directed 12 films and also produced and distributed a number of films. After starring in numerous Kannada films with minor roles, he starred in his first movie as an independent actor in Male Bantu Male. In 1984, Sarja made his Tamil debut in Rama Narayanan's film Nandri. During the subsequent years he acted in many Telugu and Kannada films portraying lead and supporting roles in Trimurtulu (1987), Premagni (1989), Prathap (1990) and Shivanaga (1992).

Sarja made his directorial debut with the film Sevagan in 1992. In 1993, he starred in his first breakthrough film as a contemporary actor in S. Shankar's Gentleman, which opened to positive reviews, while Sarja went on to win the Tamil Nadu State Film Award for Best Actor. He then starred in commercially successful films such as Jai Hind (1994), Karnaa (1995), and the crime drama film Kurudhipunal (1995). In 1999, he starred in the political thriller Mudhalvan (1999). Sarja won critical acclaim for portraying an ambitious television reporter who became the Chief Minister of Tamil Nadu for a day. The film ran for over 100 days in theaters and won awards on a regional scale.

In 2000, he starred in Vasanth's film Rhythm. He appeared in several action films in which he directed and featured in lead roles are Ezhumalai (2002) and Parasuram (2003), while also starred in Arasatchi (2004). The films, Giri (2004) and Marudhamalai (2007) were box office hits, while several were average grossers including Madrasi (2006), Vathiyar (2006) and Durai (2008). He portrayed the role of the Hindu deity Hanuman in Krishna Vamsi's devotional film Sri Anjaneyam (2004).

Since 2010, Sarja has attempted to change his "action king" image and played negative roles. In 2011, he starred alongside Ajith Kumar in Venkat Prabhu's crime thriller Mankatha, which became a box office success. The following year he appeared in Kannada film Prasad, for which he won the Karnataka State Film Award for Best Actor. He then starred in Mani Ratnam's Kadal (2013), in which he portrayed in the role of a smuggler, which went on to become a box office failure. In a directorial venture, Jai Hind 2 became a box office success in Kannada, while the Tamil and Telugu versions failed at the box office. In 2017, he starred in his 150th film Nibunan which was simultaneously made in Kannada as Vismaya. He then acted in the Telugu film Naa Peru Surya, followed by the Tamil action movie Irumbu Thirai (2018), which later became a blockbuster at the box office.

== As actor ==
Key
†	Denotes films that have not yet been released

List of films and roles
Year	Film	Role(s)	Language(s)	Notes	Ref.
1981	Simhada Mari Sainya	Arjun	Kannada		
1983	Aasha	Arjun	Kannada		
1983	Prema Yuddha	Raja	Kannada		
1984	Pooja Phala	Kumar	Kannada		
1984	Prema Jyothi	Anand	Kannada		
1984	Male Bantu Male	Subbu	Kannada		
1984	Pralayanthaka	Arjun	Kannada	Guest appearance	
1984	Nandri	Murugan	Tamil	Tamil debut	
1984	Kadamai	Jeeva	Tamil		
1985	Naagam	CID officer	Tamil		
1985	Maa Pallelo Gopaludu	Gopalam	Telugu	Telugu debut	
1985	Ilamai	Arjun	Tamil		
1985	Terror	Kaali	Telugu		
1985	Bangaru Chilaka	Raja	Telugu		
1985	Engal Kural	Raja	Tamil		
1985	Yaar?	Major Jagan	Tamil		
1985	Vesham	Ashok	Tamil		
1985	Avan	Johnny	Tamil		
1985	Sivappu Kili		Tamil		
1986	Naga Devatha	School master	Telugu		
1986	Na Ninna Preetisuve	Pruthvi	Kannada		
1986	Kutra	Arjun	Telugu		
1986	Prathidwani	Ravi	Telugu		
1986	Kotigadu	Koti	Telugu		
1986	Kulirkaala Megangal	Prem	Tamil		
1986	En Sabadham	Vijay	Tamil		
1986	Mannemlo Monagadu	Arjun	Telugu		
1986	Cowboy No. 1	Vijay	Telugu		
1986	Konaseema Kurradu	Rambabu	Telugu		
1986	Vettai		Tamil	Delayed release; Filmed in 1984	
1987	Manavadostunnadu	Babu	Telegu		
1987	Kalyana Kacheri	Vadivelu	Tamil		
1987	Sankar Guru	Inspector Shankar Guru	Tamil	Bilingual film	
1987	Chinnari Devatha	Inspector Babu	Telugu	Bilingual film	
1987	Thayaramma Thandava Krishna	Thandava Krishna	Telugu		
1987	Trimurtulu	Siva	Telugu		
1987	Monagadu	Vijay	Telugu		
1987	Garjinchina Ganga	Gopi	Telugu		
1987	Prathispandhana		Telugu		
1987	Nyayaniki Sankellu	Nethaji	Telugu		
1987	Rakshasa Samharam	Babu / Arjun	Telugu		
1988	Doctor Gari Abbai	Kranthi	Telugu		
1988	Thaimel Aanai	Raja	Tamil		
1988	Chattamtho Chadarangam	Madhu	Telugu		
1988	Veguchukka Pagatichukka	Bhargava	Telugu		
1988	Dhaayam Onnu	Arun (Raja / Ilaiyaraja / Arjun / Ignatius Immanuel Inbaraj)	Tamil		
1988	Siripuram Chinnodu	Ravi	Telugu		
1988	Coolie	Gopi	Telugu		
1988	Thaai Paasam	Raja	Tamil		
1988	August 15 Raatri	Abhimanyu	Telugu		
1988	Pattikkattu Thambi	Chinna Thambi	Tamil		
1989	Vettaiyaadu Vilaiyaadu	Raja	Tamil		
1989	Padicha Pulla	Kasi	Tamil		
1989	En Thangai	Pandiyan	Tamil		
1989	Sonthakkaran	Rajadurai	Tamil		
1989	Annanukku Jai	Kaali	Tamil		
1989	Enga Annan Varattum	Manikkam	Tamil		
1989	Premagni	Vikram	Kannada		
1990	Paattali Magan	Gopi	Tamil		
1990	Manaivi Oru Manickam	Vijay	Tamil		
1990	Periya Idathu Pillai	Vijay	Tamil		
1990	Prathap	SP Prathap	Kannada		
1990	Aatha Naan Pass Ayittaen	Chinnasamy	Tamil		
1990	Thangaikku Oru Thalattu	Gopi / Prakash	Tamil		
1991	Thanga Thamaraigal	Ramu	Tamil		
1991	Enga Ooru Sippai	Rasaiyya	Tamil		
1992	Sevagan	DSP Sanjay	Tamil	Also director	
1992	Mudhal Kural	Karan	Tamil		
1992	Annan Ennada Thambi Ennada	Shankar	Tamil		
1992	Police Lockup	Arjun	Kannada		
1992	Snehada Kadalalli	Krishna	Kannada		
1992	Shivanaga	Shiva	Kannada		
1993	Pratap	Pratap	Tamil		
1993	Gokulam	Kannan	Tamil	Guest appearance	
1993	Alimayya	Anantha	Kannada		
1993	Gentleman	Krishnamoorthy (Kicha)	Tamil	Tamil Nadu State Film Award for Best Actor	
1993	Dhuruva Natchathiram	Suriyadevan	Tamil	Delayed release; Filmed in 1990	
1993	Karpagam Vanthachu	Sakthivel	Tamil	Delayed release; Filmed in 1992	
1993	Rojavai Killathe	Alexander (Duraipandi)	Tamil		
1994	Jaihind	ACP Bharath	Tamil		
1994	Mettupatti Mirasu	Chinnadurai	Tamil	Delayed release; Filmed in 1991	
1994	Sadhu	Sathyamoorthy (Sakthi)	Tamil		
1994	Maa Voori Maaraju	Suribabu	Telugu		
1995	Mudhal Udhayam	Seenu	Tamil	Delayed release; Filmed in 1993	
1995	Karnaa	Vijay / Karnaa	Tamil		
1995	Kuruthipunal	Abbas IPS	Tamil	Bilingual film	
1995	Ayudha Poojai	Krishnasamy	Tamil		
1996	Sengottai	SP Sekhar IPS	Tamil		
1996	Drohi	Abbas IPS	Telugu	Bilingual film	
1996	Subash	Colonel Subash	Tamil		
1997	Adimai Changili	Karthikeyan (Kannan)	Tamil		
1998	Kondattam	Raja (Ramu)	Tamil		
1998	Thayin Manikodi	Arjun	Tamil		
1998	Zulm-O-Sitam	Arjun	Hindi	Hindi Debut	
1998	Subhavartha	Rajendra Prasad (Raja)	Telugu	Partially re-shot in Tamil as Mannavaru Chinnavaru	
1999	Nanbaa	Unknown	Tamil	Shelved Movie	
1999	Suriya Paarvai	Vijay	Tamil	Partially re-shot in Telugu as Hello Friend	
1999	Mannavaru Chinnavaru	Rajendra Prasad (Raja)	Tamil	100th Film; Partially reshot version of Telugu film Subhavartha	
1999	Suyamvaram	ACP Sanjay	Tamil		
1999	Kannodu Kanbathellam	Seetharam	Tamil		
1999	Mudhalvan	Pughazhendi	Tamil		
2000	Sudhandhiram	Vishwa	Tamil		
2000	Rhythm	Karthikeyan	Tamil		
2000	Vaanavil	Surya	Tamil		
2001	Vedham	Vijay	Tamil		
2001	Sri Manjunatha	Manjunatha	Kannada		
2001	Hanuman Junction	Krishna	Telugu		
2002	Ezhumalai	Ezhumalai	Tamil		
2003	Parasuram	ACP Parasuram	Tamil		
2003	Ottran	Karthik	Tamil		
2004	Puttintiki Ra Chelli	Sivanna	Telugu	Partially re-shot in Tamil as Anbu Sagotharan	
2004	Sri Anjaneyam	Lord Anjaneya	Telugu		
2004	Arasatchi	Siddharth	Tamil		
2004	Giri	Giri (Shiva)	Tamil		
2004	Jai Soorya	Jai Anand IAS / Surya	Tamil		
2005	Chinna	Chinna	Tamil		
2005	Aanai	Vijay IPS	Tamil		
2006	Madrasi	Kasi	Tamil	Partially re-shot in Telugu as Sivakasi	
2006	Vathiyar	Annadurai	Tamil		
2007	Manikanda	Manikanda / Raja	Tamil	Delayed release; Filmed between 2002 and 2005	
2007	Marudhamalai	Inspector Marudhamalai	Tamil	125th Film	
2007	Thavam	Marudhamalai	Tamil	Guest appearance	
2008	Swagatam	Srikanth	Telugu		
2008	Durai	Durai (Raja)	Tamil		
2008	Thiruvannamalai	Easwaran / Guruji	Tamil		
2008	Bommalattam	Vivek Varma IPS	Tamil	Partially version of Hindi as Final Cut of Director	
2009	Vayuputra	Himself	Kannada	Guest appearance	
2010	Rama Rama Krishna Krishna	Ashok Deva	Telugu		
2010	Vandae Maatharam	Anwar Hussain IPS	Tamil-Malayalam	Tamil-Malayalam bilingual film; Malayalam Debut	
2010	Vallakottai	Muthuvel (Vayuputhran)	Tamil		
2011	Mankatha	ACP Prithviraj	Tamil		
2012	This Weekend	Dr. Sanjay	Hindi	Partially re-shot in Tamil and Telugu as Kaattupuli and Aranyam, respectively	
2012	Maasi	Inspector Masilamani	Tamil		
2012	Prasad	Shankar	Kannada	Karnataka State Film Award for Best Actor	
2013	Kadal	Bergmans	Tamil	Vijay Award for Best Villain	
2013	Attahasa	D.G.P. K. Vijay Kumar	Kannada	Partially re-shot in Tamil as Vana Yuddham	
2013	Moondru Per Moondru Kadal	Paul Harris Rosario	Tamil		
2014	Jaihind 2	Abhimanyu	Tamil-Telugu-Kannada	Multilingual film	
2014	Abhimanyu	Abhimanyu	Tamil-Telugu-Kannada	Multilingual film	
2016	Game	DCP Sharat Chandra	Kannada	Kannada–Tamil bilingual film	
2016	Oru Melliya Kodu	DCP Shakthivel	Tamil	Kannada–Tamil bilingual film	
2016	Final Cut of Director	Vivek Varma IPS	Hindi	Partially re-shot in Tamil as Bommalattam	
2017	Nibunan	DSP Ranjith Kalidoss	Tamil-Kannada	150th Film	
2017	Vismaya	DSP Ranjith Kalidoss	Tamil-Kannada	150th Film	
2017	Lie	Padmanabham	Telugu		
2018	Prema Baraha	Hanuman devotee/Flight captain	Kannada-Tamil	Special appearance: Kannada–Tamil bilingual film	
2018	Solli Vidava	Hanuman devotee/Flight captain	Kannada-Tamil	Special appearance: Kannada–Tamil bilingual film	
2018	Naa Peru Surya	Dr. Rama Krishna Raju	Telugu		
2018	Irumbu Thirai	Sathyamoorthy (White Devil)	Tamil		
2019	Kolaigaran	DCP Karthikeyan	Tamil		
2019	Kurukshetra	Karna	Kannada		
2019	Jack & Daniel	Daniel Alexander IPS	Malayalam		
2019	Hero	Sathyamoorthy "Moorthy" (Mask)	Tamil	Norway Tamil Film Festival Award for Best Supporting Actor	
2021	Friendship	Sylender	Tamil		
2021	Marakkar: Lion of the Arabian Sea	Anandan	Malayalam		
2022	Khiladi	Arjun Bharadwaj	Telugu		
2022	Oppanda	Sanjay Rangaswamy	Kannada		
2023	Leo	Harold Das	Tamil	SIIMA Award for Best Actor in a Negative Role	
2024	Virunnu	Deva Narayanan	Malayalam	Partially re-shot in Tamil with Arjun Sarja portions	
2024	Virundhu	Deva Narayanan	Tamil	Partially re-shot in Tamil with Arjun Sarja portions	
2025	Vidaamuyarchi	Rakshith	Tamil		
2025	Aghathiyaa	Dr. Siddharthan	Tamil		
2025	Theeyavar Kulai Nadunga	Inspector Magudapathy	Tamil		
2026	Seetha Payanam	Giri	Telugu	Guest appearance	
2026	Blast	Rajaraman	Tamil		
2027	Polimera 3	Viraavi	Telugu	Filming	

== As director, producer, writer and distributor ==
List of films and roles
Title	Year	Credited as				Language	Notes
Title	Year	Director	Producer	Writer	Distributor	Language	Notes
Sevagan	1992	Yes	Yes	Yes	Yes	Tamil	
Prathap	1993	Yes	Yes	Yes	Yes	Tamil	
Jai Hind	1994	Yes		Yes		Tamil	
Karna	1995			Yes		Tamil	
Thayin Manikodi	1998	Yes		Yes		Tamil	
Thutta Mutta	1998		Yes			Kannada	
Suyamvaram	1999	Yes				Tamil	
Vedham	2001	Yes	Yes	Yes	Yes	Tamil	
Ezhumalai	2002	Yes		Yes		Tamil	
Parasuram	2003	Yes		Yes		Tamil	
Madrasi	2006	Yes		Yes	Yes	Tamil	
Vathiyar	2006			Yes		Tamil	
Thavam	2007		Yes		Yes	Tamil	
Durai	2008			Yes		Tamil	
Vayuputra	2009		Yes			Kannada	
Jai Hind 2 Abhimanyu	2014	Yes	Yes	Yes	Yes	Tamil; Kannada; Telugu	Multilingual; Sequel to Jai Hind; also lyricist
Prema Baraha Solli Vidava	2018	Yes	Yes	Yes	Yes	Kannada; Tamil	Bilingual film
Semma Thimiru	2021				Yes	Tamil	Tamil dubbed version of Kannada film Pogaru; Distributor only
Martin	2024			Yes		Kannada	Story only
Seetha Payanam	2026	Yes	Yes	Yes	Yes	Telugu	

== As singer ==
List of films and songs
Film	Year	Song	Music director	Notes
Jai Hind	1994	"Ootathuma"	Vidyasagar	Sang the beginning lyrics "Thanni Vechu"
Mudhal Udhayam	1995	"Raasi Nalla Raasi"	Shankar–Ganesh	
Karnaa	1995	"Hello Miss Chellama"	Vidyasagar	Spoke dialogues in the beginning, Sang alongside Chetan, Swarnalatha
Subash	1995	"Hero Honda"	Vidyasagar	
Parasuram	2003	"Chittukuruvi"	A. R. Rahman	Sang alongside Swarnalatha, Sriram Parthasarathy
Jai Soorya	2004	"Kattuna Avala Kattuvenda"	Deva	Sang alongside Vadivelu

== Television ==
List of series and roles
Series Name	Year	Role(s)	Language(s)	Channel	Notes	Ref.
Survivor Tamil	2021	Host	Tamil	Zee Tamil	Debut in Television	
