= Sree Raam Films International =

Indian film production and distribution company

- Type: Film production Film distribution
- Industry: Entertainment
- Founded: 1992
- Headquarters: Chennai, India
- Key people: Arjun Sarja; Niveditha Arjun
- Products: Motion pictures (Tamil, Kannada)

Sree Raam Films International is an Indian film production and distribution company headed by Arjun Sarja.

== History ==
Sree Raam Films International, set up by Arjun Sarja in 1992, has often been the production studio behind films directed by Arjun himself. His brother, Kishore Sarja, also directed two films under the banner. The children of two brothers, Aishwarya Arjun and Chiranjeevi Sarja have also featured in films made by the studio.

Actor Vishal worked as an assistant director with the studio during the making of Vedham (2001), while Arjun's wife Niveditha Arjun and daughters Aishwarya and Anjana Arjun have served as executive producers with the studio.

== Filmography ==
Year	Title	Language	Director	Cast	Ref.
1992	Sevagan	Tamil	Arjun Sarja	Arjun Sarja, Khushbu, Captain Raju	
1993	Prathap	Tamil	Arjun Sarja	Arjun Sarja, Khushbu, Captain Raju	
1998	Thutta Mutta	Kannada	Kishore Sarja	Ramesh Aravind, Prema, Kasthuri	
2001	Vedham	Tamil	Arjun Sarja	Arjun Sarja, Sakshi Shivanand, Vineeth	
2007	Thavam	Tamil	Sakthi Paramesh	Arun Vijay, Vandana Gupta	
2009	Vayuputra	Kannada	Kishore Sarja	Chiranjeevi Sarja, Aindrita Ray	
2014	Jaihind 2	Tamil / Telugu	Arjun Sarja	Arjun Sarja, Surveen Chawla	
2014	Abhimanyu	Kannada	Arjun Sarja	Arjun Sarja, Surveen Chawla	
2018	Prema Baraha	Kannada	Arjun Sarja	Chandan Kumar, Aishwarya Arjun	
2018	Sollividava	Tamil	Arjun Sarja	Chandan Kumar, Aishwarya Arjun	
2026	Seetha Payanam	Telugu	Arjun Sarja	Niranjan Sudhindra, Aishwarya Arjun	
