= Baava Baamaida =

2001 film by Kishore Sarja

- Theatrical release poster
- Directed by: Kishore Sarja
- Written by: Ramu; T.S. Nagabharana
- Story by: Ramu
- Based on: Pandithurai (Tamil)
- Starring: Shiva Rajkumar; Rambha; Prakash Rai
- Cinematography: Ashok Kashyap
- Edited by: S. Manohar
- Music by: Hamsalekha
- Production company: Sri Nirupama Combines
- Release date: 23 August 2001
- Running time: 161 min
- Country: India
- Language: Kannada

Baava Baamaida is a 2001 Indian Kannada-language romantic comedy film starring Shiva Rajkumar and Rambha. The film is directed by Kishore Sarja and based on the Tamil language film Pandithurai (1992) directed by Manoj Kumar.

In an interview to Kannada newspaper Vijaya Karnataka, Shiva Rajkumar had revealed that Chiranjeevi Sarja had worked as an assistant director to his uncle, director Kishore Sarja, on the sets of this movie.

== Plot ==
Raju leaves his parents to live with his newlywed sister. As days pass by, he learns that his brother-in-law has an illegal affair with another woman. Enraged, Raju decides to teach him a lesson.

== Cast ==
- Shiva Rajkumar
- Rambha
- Prakash Rai
- Vinaya Prasad
- Rani
- Jayanthi
- Loknath
- Sadhu Kokila
- Doddanna
- Ramu

== Soundtrack ==
All the songs are composed and scored by Hamsalekha.

Sl No	Song title	Singer(s)
1	"Onti Ontiyagiruvudu"	S. P. Balasubrahmanyam, K. S. Chithra
2	"Yavvi Yavvi"	S. P. Balasubrahmanyam, Kavita Krishnamurthy
3	"Chennagide"	Radhika Thilak
4	"Jungle Hakki"	Radhika Thilak, Sonu Nigam, chorus
5	"Benna Hinde Bande"	K. S. Chithra
6	"Preeti Nee Illade"	Sonu Nigam, K. S. Chithra
