= Nivedita Jain =

Indian actress (1979–1998)

- Nivedita Jain in late 90s
- Born: 9 June 1979; Bangalore, Karnataka, India
- Died: 10 June 1998 (aged 19); Bangalore, Karnataka, India
- Other name: Nivedita Rinky
- Occupations: Actress, model

Nivedita Jain (9 June 1979 – 10 June 1998) was an Indian beauty contestant and an actress who appeared in Kannada films. She was crowned Miss Bangalore in 1994. She made her debut as actress in the 1996 film Shivaranjini.

== Career ==
Jain started her acting career as early as when she was 16. She was approached by the Rajkumar's home production in 1997 with a two-film offer. The first released movie was Shivaranjini opposite Raghavendra Rajkumar and the second release was Shiva Sainya opposite Shivarajkumar. The latter film was successful and she began to get offers from many other production houses. She made a cameo appearance alongside Ramesh Aravind in the hit movie Amrutha Varshini. She also played a vital role in the Arjun Sarja, Tabu starrer Tamil film, Thayin Manikodi. She had been set to star again opposite Arjun in Selva's Thenaali Raja, but the film was later cancelled.

Majority of her films were released in single year and with her death in the following year, her brief career came to an end.

== Filmography ==
Year	Film	Role	Notes
1996	Shivaranjani		
1996	Shiva Sainya	Sheela	
1997	Nee Mudida Mallige		
1997	Baalida Mane		
1997	Tokaleni Pitta		Telugu film
1997	Amrutha Varshini	Shruthi	Cameo appearance
1997	Prema Raga Haadu Gelathi		
1998	Thayin Manikodi	Asha	Tamil film
1998	Baalina Daari		
1998	Sutradhara		

== Death ==
On the night of 17 May 1998, Jain received serious head injuries after falling off the parapet wall of the terrace on the second floor, from a height of 35 feet, of her home located in Rajarajeshwari Nagar suburb of Bangalore. She had been practicing catwalk in preparation for the Miss India beauty contest, as she had intended a return to modeling after her last few films had not done well. The following day, 18 May, it was reported she had briefly regained consciousness but remained incoherent and her condition was considered critical. She lapsed into a coma, and for 24 days remained on life support in Mallya Hospital, Bangalore, as doctors skilled in general medicine, neurology, homeopathy, reiki and mahikari treated her for severe head injuries and multiple fractures. While she was hospitalized, her father, hoping it would bring good fortune and help her recover from her coma, renamed her Nivedita Rinki.

At 11:00 am on 10 June 1998, she was declared dead by the doctors.

== Awards and nominations ==
- 1994, Won title of Miss Bangalore
