= Spark (2026 film) =

- Directed by: Mahantesh Handral
- Written by: Mahantesh Handral
- Produced by: Garima Avinash Vashishtha
- Starring: Niranjan Sudhindra; Bhavana Menon; Prem Kumar; Rachana Inder; Ramesh Indira; Abhay Vashishtha; Shubham Singh
- Cinematography: Swamy J Gowda
- Edited by: Madhu Tumbekere
- Music by: Sachin Basrur
- Production company: Garima Avinash Productions (GAP Studios)
- Release date: 25 September 2026
- Country: India

Spark is a 2026 Indian Kannada-language investigative thriller film directed by Mahantesh Handral and produced by Garima Avinash Vashishtha. It stars Niranjan Sudhindra, Bhavana Menon, Prem Kumar, Rachana Inder, Ramesh Indira, Shubham Singh and Abhay Vashishtha.

== Plot ==
An investigative journalist takes on a massive bank scam, challenging a powerful cop and soon uncovers a deadly conspiracy that leads straight to its hidden mastermind.

== Cast ==
- Niranjan Sudhindra
- Bhavana Menon
- Prem Kumar
- Rachana Inder
- Ramesh Indira
- Abhay Vashishtha
- Shubham Singh

== Production ==
The film is produced by Garima Avinash Production.

== Release ==
The film was released on 25th September, 2026.

== Reception ==
A Sharadhaa of The New Indian Express says, "While movies about corruption often slip into loud chest-thumping, debut director Mahantesh Handral keeps Spark grounded, using an investigative thriller framework to examine systemic greed through a devastating banking scam." She adds that Handral and his cast succeed because they treat corruption not as the work of a lone rogue villain, but as a predatory web feeding on ordinary people. Even when it asks for a slight leap of logic, Spark delivers a tight, relevant procedural thriller about the cost of broken public trust.

Susmita Sameera of Times of India says that the film sets up an interesting dynamic between the aggressive police officer and the ambitious young journalist, attempting to get to the bottom of the massive financial fraud. She adds that Niranjan Sudhindra makes a good impression with his screen presence and delivers a consistent performance throughout the film. Prem Kumar and Bhavana Menon, on the other hand, surprise with the darker shades of their characters. She reviews the writing as distinctly dramatic saying that this approach brings a certain element of surprise to some of the proceedings. She adds, "There is a lot happening within the narrative, and the film attempts to balance its investigative storyline. Spark brings together an interesting premise, strong performances and plenty of commercial elements."
