= Shiva Sainya =

- Theatrical release poster
- Directed by: Shivamani
- Screenplay by: J. M. Prahlad
- Story by: Shivamani
- Produced by: Shivamani
- Starring: Shiva Rajkumar
- Cinematography: Krishna Kumar
- Edited by: K. Balu
- Music by: Ilaiyaraaja
- Production company: Yashi Enterprises
- Release date: 26 April 1996
- Running time: 138 minutes
- Country: India
- Language: Kannada

Shiva Sainya is a 1996 Indian Kannada-language political action drama film directed by Shivamani and produced by Y. S. Ramesh. The film features Shiva Rajkumar in the lead role. H. G. Somashekar Rao, Arundathi Nag, Venki and Nivedita Jain appear in supporting roles. The film's score and soundtrack was scored by Ilaiyaraaja and the cinematography was by Krishna Kumar. The film is based on the life of Prafulla Kumar Mahanta.

== Plot ==
The plot follows a group of youths who are disgusted with corruption in the government that they helped form. They proceed to lead a movement and topple it, before forming their own political party and rising to power in an attempt to provide honest governance, led by Shiva, played by Shiva Rajkumar.

== Cast ==
- Shiva Rajkumar as Shiva
- Nivedita Jain as Sheela
- H. G. Somashekar Rao as Ramachandra Rao
- C. R. Simha as Rajashekhar
- Doddanna as Mallayya
- Arundathi Nag as Shiva's mentor
- Mukhyamantri Chandru as aide of Shiva's mentor
- Kadandale Venkatesh (venky) as Surya Swami, a godman
- Lokanath as Shiva's father
- Sadashiva Brahmavar as a politician
- Shankar Rao as Shankar Rao
- Sathyabhama as Manamohanamma
- Sudheer as Sannappa Doddappanavar
- Dheerendra Gopal as Gunde
- Master Anand as Ramu
- Mandeep Roy as a barber
- Michael Madhu as "Bulldog"
- Nagesh Kashyap
- Vijayasarathi as Election Commissioner
- Radha Ramachandra as Parvati, Shiva's mother
- B. Jaya

== Soundtrack ==
The soundtrack of the film was composed by Ilaiyaraaja. The song "Chikkamagaloora Chikkamallige" became popular.

Track listing
No.	Title	Lyrics	Singer(s)	Length
1.	"Chikkamagaloora Chikkamallige"	Shyamsundar Kulkarni	Ilaiyaraaja, K. S. Chithra	04:51
2.	"O Mere Pyare"	V. Manohar	Mano, K. S. Chithra	05:44
3.	"Raja Namma Rajyakke"	V. Manohar	Mano	04:32
4.	"Om Shanthi Om Shanthi"	V. Manohar	Mano	05:05
5.	"Jailali Hutti"	Ilaiyaraaja	Ilaiyaraaja, Mano	05:16
6.	"Are Laila Laila"	Sriranga	Mano	04:59
7.	"Yuva Kranthiya"	Doddarangegowda	Chorus	04:57
