= Darling Darling (2000 film) =

- Poster
- Directed by: Rajasenan
- Written by: Udayakrishna; Siby K. Thomas
- Produced by: Vijaya; Gopala Krishnan; Mohan
- Starring: Kavya Madhavan; Vineeth; Dileep
- Cinematography: K. P. Nambiathiri
- Edited by: Sreekar Prasad
- Music by: Ouseppachan
- Production company: V. G. M. Creations
- Distributed by: V. G. M. Release
- Release date: 17 November 2000
- Running time: 150 minutes
- Country: India
- Language: Malayalam

Darling Darling is a 2000 Indian Malayalam-language romantic comedy-drama directed by Rajasenan and written by Udayakrishna and Siby K. Thomas. This love triangle movie stars Kavya Madhavan, Dileep and Vineeth in lead roles.The movie was remade in Kannada as Jodi and in Telugu under the same name.

== Plot ==
Subhash Chandra Bose, aka Kochu Kurup is forced to leave his hometown as he is mistaken for the lover when he tries to help his friend elope with the daughter of Unnithan, an influential localite, and is caught. His parents send him to Bangalore to meet his best friend Kartik, aka Aniyankutty, who is a rich womanizer. Aniyankutty, pretending to be Kochu Kurup goes to meet Kochu Kurup's father's friend's daughter, Shalini. There, he meets Shalini's friend Pappi aka Padmaja and introduces himself as Karthik and falls in love with Pappi. One day while driving the car Karthik hits a woman and drives away without helping her. Kochu Kurup comes across the accident and noticing that no one is helping the woman takes her to the hospital and leaves Karthik's name and phone number as he does not have an address in Bangalore. The woman in the accident was Pappi's aunt and she mistakes Kochu Kurup as the one who hit her aunt. She calls him and threatens to sue him. When her aunt wakes up and tells Pappi that Kochu Kurup is the one who saved her, Pappi calls him and apologies. As they talk on the phone they fall in love with each other and decide to meet. While Karthik and Kochu Kurup waits for Pappi at a bus stop, Karthik finds out that his Pappi and Kochu Kurup's Padmaja are the same person. From then on Karthik sabotages all the attempts made by Kochu Kurup and Padmaja to meet each other. Meanwhile, Kochu Kurup's father brings a marriage alliance to him, but he says that he is not interested, not knowing that the alliance is with Pappi herself. However, Kartik gets to know this, and he helps Kochu Kurup to cancel the wedding.

Kochu Kurup and Pappi try to elope before the marriage, unaware that the marriage scheduled for them was with each other. Aniyankutty stops Kurup on the way with the help of Unnithan's thugs so that instead of Kurup he can reach the railway station and take Pappi with him. But Pappi's family intervenes and Aniyankutty is beaten by the thugs. Pappi reaches the railway station and waits for Kochu Kurup, but when he does not show up Pappi tries to commit suicide walking down the railway track. Kochu Kurup shows up late and tries to find Pappi, but he is not able. Then he realizes Pappi is going to commit suicide and runs to save her from the train, but he is far behind. Aniyankutty wakes up from being hit by the goons and sees Pappi walking down the railway track and the train closing in. Aniyankutty runs and saves Pappi from the train just in time. Kochu Kurup thought Pappi was dead, but as the train passes by he sees that Aniyankutty saved her and explains everything to her. Pappi and Kochu Kurupp unite as Aniyankutty leaves to Bangalore.

== Cast ==
- Kavya Madhavan as Padmaja Warrier / Puppy
- Vineeth as Subhash Chandra Bose aka Kochu Kurup / Aniyankutty (fake)
- Dileep as Karthik aka Aniyankutty
- Sarath Das as Manikuttan, Kochu Kurup's best friend
- Jagathy Sreekumar as Appachan, Aniyankutty's friend and roommate
- Sukumari as Sudha Warrier, Padmaja's aunt
- C. I. Paul as Palathinkal Kurup, Kochu Kurup's father
- Janardhanan as Vattaparambil Sreedharan Unnithan, Kurup's friend
- Oduvil Unnikrishnan as Vadakkedathu Warrier, Padmaja's grandfather
- Indrans as Achu, Unnithan's helper and assistant
- Salim Kumar as telephone booth owner
- Dr. Jayan as Padmaja's brother
- Chandhu as Padmaja's brother
- Babu Swamy as G. K. Menon
- Radhika as Lathika
- Roslin as Rugmini, Kochu Kurup's mother
- Praseetha Menon as Shalini, Menon's daughter
- Geetha Nair as Menon's Wife and Shalini's mother
- Ponnamma Babu as Sarada, Padmaja's mother
- Bobby Kottarakkara as Unnithan's sidekick member
- Dhanya Menon as Sarassu, Unnithan's Daughter and Manikuttan's love interest
- Ramadevi as Unnithan's Wife and Sarassu's mother
- Jose Pellissery as Doctor
- Machan Varghese as autorickshaw driver

== Soundtrack ==
The film's soundtrack and background score were composed by Ouseppachan, with lyrics penned by S. Ramesan Nair. Notably, the song "Pranaya Sowgandhikangal" was adapted from a background score originally composed by Ouseppachan for the 1991 Malayalam film Ulladakkam.

Soundtrack Album
#	Song	Singers
1	"Aniyampoo Muttathu"	M. G. Sreekumar, Santhosh Keshav
2	"Aniyampoo Muttathu (Instrumental)"	Ouseppachan
3	"Chithirappanthalittu"	K. J. Yesudas, K. S. Chithra
4	"Darling Darling" (Version I)	Hariharan
5	"Darling Darling" (Version II)	S. P. Balasubrahmanyam
6	"Muthum Pavizhavum" (Version I)	Hariharan, Sujatha Mohan
7	"Muthum Pavizhavum" (Version II)	Sreenivas, Sujatha Mohan
8	"Pranaya Sowgandhikangal (Duet)"	Santhosh Keshav, K. S. Chithra
9	"Pranaya Sowgandhikangal (Female)"	K. S. Chithra
10	"Pranaya Sowgandhikangal (Male)"	Santhosh Keshav
