= Aatha Naan Pass Ayittaen =

- Directed by: M. K. Saimohan
- Written by: Liaquat Ali Khan
- Produced by: M. K. Saimohan
- Starring: Arjun; Shantipriya; Malashri
- Cinematography: Babu
- Music by: Vidyasagar
- Production company: Anitha Pictures
- Release date: 23 November 1990
- Running time: 137 minutes
- Country: India
- Language: Tamil

Aatha Naan Pass Ayittaen (transl. Mum, I've passed!) is a 1990 Tamil language drama film produced and directed by M. K. Saimohan. The film stars Arjun, Shantipriya and Malashri. It was released on 23 November 1990.

== Cast ==
- Arjun as Chinnasamy
- Shantipriya
- Malashri
- Gandhimathi
- Anuja
- S. R. Vijaya
- Senthil
- Vennira Aadai Moorthy
- Jai Ganesh
- K. Kannan
- Usilai Mani
- Kullamani
- Sharjah Sheriff
- Satishkumar
- Venky
- Jacky Siva

== Soundtrack ==
The soundtrack was composed by Vidyasagar, with lyrics by Vaali.

Song	Singer(s)
"Kanaavil Partha"	S. P. Balasubrahmanyam, K. S. Chithra
"Nethu Varaikum"	Mano
"Onna Renda Ava"	Malaysia Vasudevan, S. P. Sailaja
"Ponga Vachi"	Malaysia Vasudevan, Swarnalatha
"Moonu Mozha"	S. P. Balasubrahmanyam, K. S. Chithra

== Release ==
Aatha Naan Pass Aayitten was released on 23 November 1990 alongside another Arjun starrer Thangaikku Oru Thalattu.
