= Thutta Mutta =

- Directed by: Kishore Sarja
- Written by: Richard Louis
- Produced by: Arjun Sarja
- Starring: Ramesh Aravind; Prema; Sujatha; Kasthuri
- Cinematography: Ramesh Babu
- Edited by: K. Balu
- Music by: Hamsalekha
- Production company: Sree Raam Films International
- Release date: 21 January 1998
- Running time: 146 minutes
- Country: India
- Language: Kannada

Thutta Mutta is a 1998 Indian Kannada-language romantic drama film directed by Kishore Sarja and produced by his brother, actor Arjun Sarja. The story was written by Richard Louis. The film cast includes Ramesh Aravind, Prema, Kasthuri and Sujatha.

The original score and soundtrack for the film were composed and written by Hamsalekha.

== Cast ==
- Ramesh Aravind as Harsha
- Prema as Pooja, Harsha's wife
- Kasthuri as Dr. Seema
- Sujatha as Anasuya, Harsha's mother
- Srinath
- Tennis Krishna
- Doddanna
- Ashalatha as Kamakshamma
- B. V. Radha as Savitri, Pooja's mother
- Girija Lokesh
- Shivarjun
- Nagendra Shah
- Pramod Raj
- Ramesh Rao

== Soundtrack ==
The music of the film was composed and lyrics written by Hamsalekha.

Thutta Mutta

Soundtrack album by Hamsalekha
- Released: 1998
- Genre: Feature film soundtrack
- Label: Akash Audio

No.	Title	Singer(s)	Length
1.	"Thaare Thaare"	P. Unnikrishnan
2.	"Thusu Mella Beesu"	S. P. Balasubrahmanyam
3.	"Madhana Kama Raja"	S. P. Balasubrahmanyam, K. S. Chithra
4.	"Anga Anga Seri"	S. P. Balasubrahmanyam, K. S. Chithra
5.	"Muttu Kodolu Bandaga"	P. Unnikrishnan
6.	"Thusu Mella Beesu"	K. S. Chithra
7.	"Baligobba Bandhu"	C. Ashwath
