= Kishore Sarja =

Indian director

- Born: c. 1959
- Died: 27 June 2009 (aged 50); Bangalore, India
- Occupation: Film director
- Years active: 1993–2009
- Spouse: Aparna
- Children: 1
- Relatives: Sarja family

Kishore Sarja (1959 - 27 June 2009) was an Indian film director who worked in Kannada-language films.

== Career ==
Kishore Sarja started his career as an assistant director before making his directorial debut with Alimayya (1993) starring his brother Arjun Sarja, which was a remake of the 1987 Tamil film Kalyana Kacheri starring Arjun. He is known for directing the film Thutta Mutta (1998), starring Ramesh Aravind, which was commercially successful and his only film that was not a remake. He also directed other films including Baava Baamaida (2001) and Jodi (2001), both starring Shiva Rajkumar. He introduced his nephew, Chiranjeevi Sarja with the film Vayuputra (2009), which was produced by Arjun Sarja.

== Personal life ==
Sarja's father, Shakti Prasad, was an actor in Kannada cinema while his brother Arjun Sarja is a filmmaker and actor. Kishore died on 26 June 2009. A week before his death, he had been admitted to a hospital, where he was treated for multiple health problems.

== Filmography ==
Director

- Alimayya (1993)
- Thutta Mutta (1998)
- Baava Baamaida (2001)
- Jodi (2001)
- Vayuputra (2009)

Producer

- Padicha Pulla (1989) (Tamil)
- Pratap (1993; as co-producer)
