= Prema Raga Haadu Gelathi =

- Poster
- Directed by: Sunil Kumar Desai
- Written by: Yandamuri Veerendranath (Nishyabda novel)
- Produced by: Jayashree Devi
- Starring: Shiva Rajkumar; Ramesh Aravind; Nivedita Jain; Srinath
- Cinematography: A. V. Krishna Kumar
- Edited by: R. Janardhan
- Music by: Ilaiyaraaja
- Production company: Chinni Films
- Release date: 28 November 1997
- Running time: 165 minutes
- Country: India
- Language: Kannada

Prema Raga Haadu Gelathi (transl. Sing the song of love, girl) is a 1997 Indian Kannada-language romantic drama film directed by Sunil Kumar Desai based on Yandamuri Veerendranath's novel Nishyabda translated into Kannada by Sharadatanaya. The movie was produced by Jayashree Devi. The film stars Shiva Rajkumar, Ramesh Aravind and Nivedita Jain.

The film marked the reunion of the director Desai, producer Jayashree Devi, actors Shiva Rajkumar and Ramesh Aravind and music composer Ilaiyaraaja after their successful venture Nammoora Mandara Hoove in 1996. However, this film could not taste the same success as the previous venture.

== Cast ==
- Shiva Rajkumar as Anand
- Ramesh Aravind
- Nivedita Jain
- Srinath
- Lokesh
- Loknath
- Bhavyashri Rai
- Vaishali Kasaravalli
- Sihi Kahi Chandru
- Archana
- Shivaram
- Renukamma Murugod
- Kunigal Nagabhushan

== Soundtrack ==
The soundtrack of the film was composed by Ilaiyaraaja who teamed up with the director after the successful score in Nammoora Mandara Hoove (1996).

Track listing
No.	Title	Lyrics	Singer(s)	Length
1.	"Baa Baare O Gelathi"	S. M. Patil	S. P. Balasubrahmanyam, Chandrika Gururaj
2.	"Lalanamani Lalanamani"	K. Kalyan	S. P. Balasubrahmanyam, Chandrika Gururaj, Gangadhar
3.	"Naav Andaaga"	K. Kalyan	S. P. Balasubrahmanyam, Manjula Gururaj
4.	"Baa Baare O Gelathi - Bit"	S. M. Patil	S. P. Balasubrahmanyam, Chandrika Gururaj
5.	"Malle Hoo Maale"	S. M. Patil	Gangadhar
6.	"O Baale Baale"	K. Kalyan	Shivarajkumar
