= Premagni =

- Directed by: T. S. Nagabharana
- Written by: T. S. Nagabharana
- Screenplay by: T. S. Nagabharana
- Produced by: V Varghees
- Starring: Arjun Sarja; Khushbu; Sundar Krishna Urs; Shashikumar
- Cinematography: R. Deviprasad
- Edited by: Suresh Urs
- Music by: Hamsalekha
- Production company: Surya Creators
- Release date: 22 December 1989
- Country: India
- Language: Kannada

Premagni is a 1989 Indian Kannada-language film directed by T. S. Nagabharana and produced by V. Varghees. The film stars Arjun Sarja, Khushbu, Sundar Krishna Urs and Shashikumar in the lead roles. The film has a musical score by Hamsalekha. The film was dubbed into Tamil as Thennattu Venghai.

== Cast ==
- Arjun Sarja
- Khushbu
- Sundar Krishna Urs
- Shashikumar
- Tara
- Sathyapriya
- Shankar Rao
- Chinna Kasaragod
- C. R. Shashikumar
- Nagesh Mayya
- Jackie Shivu
- Shivaprakash
- Chikka Suresh
- Ramashankar
- Shekar
- Sriranga
- Madhu
- Prema
- Rani
- Naveena
- Mala
- Saritha
- Madhavi

== Soundtrack ==
Lyrics written by Hamsalekha.

1. Hey Priya - S. P. Balasubrahmanyam, Latha Hamsalekha
2. Giniyu Kacchada - S. P. Balasubrahmanyam, S. Janaki
3. Hatthira Hatthira - S. P. Balasubrahmanyam, S. Janaki
4. O Kogile Koogu - S. P. Balasubrahmanyam, S. Janaki
5. Naa Nee Nee Naadavu - S. P. Balasubrahmanyam, S. Janaki
