= Seetha Payanam =

2026 film directed by Arjun Sarja

- Theatrical release poster
- Directed by: Arjun
- Screenplay by: Arjun
- Dialogues by: Sai Madhav Burra
- Story by: Arjun
- Produced by: Arjun
- Starring: Niranjan Sudhindra; Aishwarya Arjun
- Cinematography: G. Balamurugan
- Edited by: Ayoob Khan
- Music by: Anup Rubens
- Production company: Sree Raam Films International
- Distributed by: Asian Cinemas; Sree Raam Films International
- Release date: 14 February 2026
- Running time: 152 minutes
- Country: India
- Language: Telugu

Seetha Payanam (transl. Seetha's Journey) is a 2026 Indian Telugu-language road romantic drama film written, directed and produced by Arjun under the banner of Sree Raam Films International. The films stars Niranjan Sudhindra and Aishwarya Arjun (in their Telugu debut), with Arjun and Dhruva Sarja making special appearances in the film. The film was also dubbed in Kannada, Tamil, and Malayalam with the former being titled Seetha Payana and the latter two having the same title, respectively.

Seetha Payanam was theatrically released on 14 February 2026, coinciding with Valentine's Day and received mixed reviews from critics.

== Plot ==
Seetha loses her mother in childhood, and her father, Rajendra Prasad, raises her with immense love, becoming both mother and father. They share a close bond, but Seetha always avoids the topic of marriage. She travels from Vizag to Hyderabad for work, where she meets Abhi. During the journey, a few unexpected incidents change her life. What exactly happened on the trip? What roles do Giri and Pawan play? And finally, does Seetha get married or not? The answers unfold on screen.

== Cast ==
- Aishwarya Arjun as Seetha
- Niranjan Sudhindra as Dr. Abhiram "Abhi"
- Sathyaraj as Rajendra Prasad, Seetha's father
- Prakash Raj as Anjaneyulu, Abhi's grandfather
- Kovai Sarala
- Bithiri Sathi
- Saran Shakthi
- Siri Hanumanth
- Mani Chandana
- Sumithra as Anjaneyulu's wife and Abhi's grandmother
- Sahasra
- Dubbing Janaki
- Raj Kumar
- Naga Mahesh
- Posani Krishna Murali
- Jabardasth Phani
- Narra Srinivas
- Fish Venkat
- Mallesh Yadav
- Prathibha Prathap
- Rafi
- Arjun as Giri (special appearance)
- Dhruva Sarja as Pawan (special appearance)

== Production ==
Reports that Arjun directing Vishwak Sen in the Telugu debut film of Aishwarya Arjun came in May 2022. After a fallout, both Arjun and Viswak Sen decided to part ways.

The film's title was officially announced in October 2024 with Niranjan Sudhindra replacing Vishwak Sen, marking his Telugu debut.

== Music ==
The soundtrack and background score are composed by Anup Rubens. The audio rights were acquired by Saregama.

== Reception ==
Divya Shree of The Times of India rated it 2.5 out of 5 stars and wrote, "While it impresses with performances, visuals, and intent, it falls short of becoming a truly memorable cinematic experience". Suresh Kavirayani of Cinema Express rated the film 1.5 out of 5 stars and wrote, "Seetha Payanam turns out to be a tedious journey rather than an emotional one".
