= 2nd Half =

2018 film by Yogi Devegange

- Release poster
- Directed by: Yogi Devegange
- Produced by: Nagesh
- Starring: Priyanka Upendra; Surabhi Santosh; Niranjan Sudhindra
- Cinematography: R K Shivakumar
- Music by: Chetan Sosca
- Release date: 1 June 2018
- Country: India
- Language: Kannada

2nd Half is a 2018 Indian Kannada-language crime-thriller film directed by debutant Yogi Devegange. It stars Priyanka Upendra, Surabhi Santosh and Niranjan Sudhindra in the lead. The music direction is by Chetan Sosca.

== Plot ==
The story focuses on the life of a police constable, Anuradha (Priyanka Upendra), who is assigned to the police CCTV control room. On her job, she becomes intrigued by the life of a young girl, Saranya (Surabhi Santosh), who is a free-spirited artist. One day, she witnesses the girl go missing one day through the CCTV, which abruptly ends when the camera stops working. The rest of the story focuses on Anuradha's mission to find the girl with the help of a local boy named Niru (Niranjan Sudhindra), who also happens to be Saranya's lover.

== Cast ==
- Priyanka Upendra as Anuradha
- Surabhi Santosh as Saranya
- Niranjan Sudhindra as Niru
- Shalini
- Veena Sundar
- Sharath Lohitashwa
- Ritesh Gowda

== Production ==
Talking about her character in 2nd Half, Priyanka Upendra said: "The movie's content is such that it talks about the khakhi profession and highlights how juniors are treated insignificantly by seniors. It becomes very difficult to make yourself 'heard'." While explaining her interest to be part of new age cinema, she continued, "It's easy to do the tried-and tested methods. But it's hard to take the road less taken. The same applies for films and directors. One such is Yogi Devagange, a director who is open to taking risks. Which is why I like associating with him on work. Such roles, for me as an actor, are challenging. For example, when I first heard the story of 2nd Half, I felt that it was a story that would definitely work."

It also marks the entry of actor Upendra's nephew Niranjan into the Kannada film industry. On choosing 2nd Half as his debut, he said: "Since I've grown up being interested in theatre, I've closely observed my Uncle and his acting style. I've also understood the intricacies of camera work since I associated with him in Uppi 2. Initially, I was considering entering the industry after mastering every department. I wanted to hone my skills, come in as a complete package and become a director's actor. But when 2nd Half happened, I realised that it was the right film to debut with," says Niranjan, who consulted his uncle before taking the plunge into the industry. "He felt that I shouldn't miss an opportunity that came knocking at his door. His words made me realise that it's okay to start small and scale up."

== Reception ==
The film released on 1 June 2018 to mixed to positive reviews.

The Times of India rated the film 2 out of 5, stating that it "unfurls at a sluggish pace and the songs in the film feel rather forced, too".

Cinema Express said that "The premise of this crime plot is different enough from the rest to warrant attention. Just be warned of the slow build up." while giving it 3 out of 5.

The New Indian Express also gave a 3 out of 5 rating, stating: "Priyanka, on her part takes a lot of responsibility on her shoulders. Being the centre point of the film, she has gone as per the director's vision. For Niranjan, 2nd Half becomes a trial run, before he gets his next big picture. A little hardwork from his end, might help to mould his career. This is just the beginning and he has a long way to go. Surabhi Santhosh is the soul of the film with the revolving mostly around him. Even though she doesn't have much screen space, 2nd Half doesn't make for a complete picture without her."
