= Amruthavarshini (film) =

- Video cover
- Directed by: Dinesh Baboo
- Written by: Dinesh Baboo
- Produced by: Bharathi Devi
- Starring: Suhasini; Sarath Babu; Ramesh Aravind
- Cinematography: Dinesh Baboo
- Edited by: B S Kemparaju
- Music by: Deva
- Production company: Chinni Chitra
- Release date: 29 January 1997
- Running time: 147 minutes
- Country: India
- Language: Kannada

Amruthavarshini (transl. Rain of immortal nectar) is a 1997 Indian Kannada-language romantic thriller film written, photographed and directed by Dinesh Baboo. It stars Suhasini, Ramesh Aravind and Sarath Babu. Nivedita Jain appears in a cameo role. It features Ramesh Arvind playing a negative role for which he was widely praised. The film revolves around the three central characters of a husband (Sharath), wife (Suhasini) and a friend (Ramesh) who intrudes into the couple's life and turns their life into tragic events.

Upon release, the film was declared a blockbuster hit with all the songs of the soundtrack composed by Deva becoming evergreen hits. The film was one of the highest grossers at the box-office for the year 1997. The film was awarded with multiple State Awards and Filmfare Awards, particularly for the story and acting.

The film was subsequently dubbed in Telugu with same title name and in Tamil as Uyirinum Melaaga. In Malayalam, the film was remade as Mazhavillu (1999) by the same director.

== Plot ==
Hemanth heads an advertising firm and is happily married to Veena. His childhood friend and poet Abhishek Bharadwaj visits him and stays with the family for a while. Abhishek is depressed due to the death of his girlfriend, Shruti, due to cancer. Before her death, Shruthi had asked Abhishek to promise her that he would marry another girl after her death. A prolonged stay at Hemanth's leads to Abhishek becoming obsessed with Veena due to her strong resemblance to Shruthi. Hemanth learns of this but does not reveal it to Veena.

A few days later, the three, together with the employees of Hemanth's firm, take a trip to Kodaikanal. Abhishek happens to drive Hemanth to a cliff in an off-road vehicle for the latter to photograph the sunset. Once there, Hemanth chides Abhishek over his advances towards Veena and asks him to return home before things worsen. However, Abhishek, in an attempt to kill him, puts the vehicle's gears in neutral hoping it would run him down the cliff. Hemanth survives the hit but is left hanging off the cliff; Abhishek does not save him.

Veena is distraught over her husband's death. Friends of Hemanth request Abhishek to stay with Veena at her residence until she recovers. However, Veena learns of Abhishek's intentions and confides in her friend, Dr. Vimala. She has also got hold of the negatives from her husband's motorised camera and develops them only to find that all of her husband's final moments were captured, including Abhishek watching on as he asked for help. However, she pretends to have moved on and suggests that she is ready to share her life with Abhishek and announces before her friends that she would marry him. A day later, she asks him to take her to the cliff where Hemanth died as it was his long-cherished dream to take photographs from there. Once there, she confronts and reveals that she knows what transpired on that fateful day before handing over a trembling Abhishek the developed photographs. She then kills her self by leaping from the cliff, in front of him, as a revenge.

== Cast ==
- Suhasini as Veena
- Sarath Babu as Hemanth
- Ramesh Aravind as Abhishek Bharadwaj
- Ramakrishna as Janakiram
- Nivedita Jain as Shruthi (cameo)
- Tara as Vimala
- Sathyapriya as Abhishek's mother
- Kunigal Nagabhushan as Ranganna
- Vinayak Joshi as Peter, tourist guide in Kodaikanal (uncredited)

== Production ==
Dinesh Baboo prepared the story in 1979. In 1987-88, he met Suhasini Maniratnam and narrated the story of Amruthavarshini; however, that meeting ended up in the film Suprabhatha (1988). Suhasini called Dinesh Baboo while he was in Kerala about producer Jayashreedevi, who was looking for a director-cum-cinematographer for their next venture. Baboo did not like the director's script and he told her the story of Amruthavarshini. Ramesh Aravind's character had very few lines and had to convey his expressions through his eyes and face. Due to his challenging character, Ramesh Aravind had a headache after the climax and felt exhausted for the next scene. Palani Senapathy made his debut as a sound designer.

== Soundtrack ==
Amrutha Varshini

Soundtrack album by Deva
- Released: 18 September 1996
- Genre: Feature film soundtrack
- Length: 34:45
- Label: Lahari Music

Deva composed the music for the film and the soundtrack, with lyrics of the tracks penned by K. Kalyan. The soundtrack album has nine tracks.

Tracklist
No.	Title	Singer(s)	Length
1.	"Tunturu (Female Version)"	K. S. Chithra	5:21
2.	"Ee Sundara"	K. S. Chithra, S. P. Balasubrahmanyam	5:16
3.	"Manase Baduku"	S. P. Balasubrahmanyam	5:04
4.	"Kannina Notagalu"	S. P. Balasubrahmanyam, K. M. Kusuma	5:30
5.	"Tampu Tangali"	K. S. Chithra	0:30
6.	"Bhale Bhale Chandadha"	S. P. Balasubrahmanyam, K. M. Kusuma	5:27
7.	"Yella Shilpagaligu"	K. S. Chithra, S.P Balasubrahmanyam	5:21
8.	"Gaali Gaali"	K. S. Chithra	1:51
9.	"Tunturu (Male Version)"	Gangadhar	0:25
Total length:			34:45

== Reception ==
Rajitha of Rediff.com wrote that "What appears in print to be a trite, thrice-told tale reveals, on celluloid, an ability to grip, to carry the viewer along on a tide of emotions ranging from the soft through the turbulent into the increasingly darker shades. And a lot of the credit goes to the three major performers, with Suhasini showing no sign of rust from her layoff. What is interesting is the way the film -- by no means a whodunit, because you know right at the outset that Arvind is the culprit -- keeps you nailed, your sympathies oscillating between Arvind and Suhasini till the very end".

Reviewing the Tamil dubbed version, Malathi Rangarajan of The Hindu wrote, "Nevertheless you can sense Dinesh Babu's urge to be different. And he succeeds in being exactly that - different".

== Awards ==
- It won the Arya Bhata Award and was also screened at the Indian Panorama Festival.
- Filmfare Award for Best Film – Kannada 1997 - B. Jayashree Devi
- Filmfare Award for Best Actor – Kannada 1997 - Ramesh Aravind
- Filmfare Award for Best Music Director – Kannada 1997 - Deva
- Karnataka State Film Award for Best Screenplay
- Karnataka State Film Award for Best Editor - Kemparaj
- Screen Award for Best Actress (Kannada) – Suhasini Maniratnam
- Screen Award for Best Actor (Kannada) - Ramesh Aravind (shared with America America)

== Legacy ==
The song "Tunturu" inspired a 2018 film of the same name also starring Ramesh Aravind.
