= Jodi (2001 film) =

- DVD cover
- Directed by: Kishore Sarja
- Written by: M. S. Ramesh (dialogue)
- Screenplay by: Kishore Sarja
- Based on: Darling Darling (Malayalam) by Rajasenan
- Produced by: Rockline Venkatesh
- Starring: Shiva Rajkumar; Jaggesh; Poonam Singar
- Cinematography: P. K. H. Das
- Edited by: Shyam
- Music by: S. A. Rajkumar
- Production company: Rockline Productions
- Release date: 7 December 2001
- Country: India
- Language: Kannada

Jodi (transl. Couple) is a 2001 Indian Kannada-language romantic comedy film directed by Kishore Sarja, starring Shiva Rajkumar, Jaggesh and Poonam Singar with Mukhyamantri Chandru, Doddanna and Sadhu Kokila portraying supporting roles. The film's soundtrack was composed by S. A. Rajkumar. It was released on 7 December 2001. The film is a remake of the Malayalam film Darling Darling (2000) and was a box office failure.

== Cast ==
- Shiva Rajkumar as Vinod
- Jaggesh as Sunil
- Poonam Singar as Pushpa
- Mukhyamantri Chandru
- Doddanna
- Lokanath
- Sadhu Kokila
- Sanketh Kashi
- Kalyani
- Shailaja Joshi
- Chitra Shenoy
- Shankar Ashwath
- Killer Venkatesh
- Ramesh Bhat
- R. G. Vijayasarathy

== Production ==
When Rockline Venkatesh decided to remake Malayalam film Darling Darling in Kannada, he originally chose Dinesh Babu to direct the film. Babu who initially agreed to direct later pulled out from the venture after he got an offer from Usha Kiran Movies. This led Venkatesh to file a complaint against Babu at Kannada Producers Association which initially banned him but was later revoked after Babu agreed to pay penalty. He was replaced by Kishore Sarja.

== Soundtrack ==
The film's soundtrack was composed by S. A. Rajkumar.

Track listing
No.	Title	Lyrics	Singer(s)	Length
1.	"O Preetiye"	K. Kalyan	K. S. Chithra, S. P. Balasubrahmanyam	5:14
2.	"Minche Ninnava"	R. N. Jayagopal	Mano, Anuradha Sriram	4:50
3.	"Darling"	R. N. Jayagopal	S. P. Balasubrahmanyam, Devan	4:39
4.	"Gentleman"	R. N. Jayagopal	S. P. Balasubrahmanyam, Devan	5:09
5.	"Neeligiriya Mele"	R. N. Jayagopal	Hemanth, Archana Udupa	4:51
6.	"Suriya Nodayya"	R. N. Jayagopal	Anuradha Sriram, Suresh Peters	4:53
Total length:				29:36

== Reception ==
A critic from Chitraloka.com described Jodi as an "amazing love triangle". Sify wrote "Director Kishore Sarja keeps us guessing till the end, as to who gets the girl! He can be applauded for crafting the film well [..] On the whole the film is an entertainer".
