= Alimayya =

- Directed by: Kishore Sarja
- Story by: Manivannan
- Produced by: N. Kumar
- Starring: Arjun Sarja; Shruti; Lokesh
- Cinematography: Mallikarjun
- Edited by: Prasad
- Music by: M. M. Keeravani
- Production company: Sri Lakshmi Films
- Release date: 23 June 1993
- Running time: 123 minutes
- Country: India
- Language: Kannada

Alimayya is a 1993 Indian Kannada-language romantic drama film written by Manivannan and directed by Kishore Sarja in his directorial debut. The film starred Arjun Sarja and Shruti. The film is a remake of 1987 Tamil film Kalyana Kacheri which was also an Arjun Sarja starrer. The film had a musical score by M. M. Keeravani and was produced by N. Kumar.

== Cast ==
- Arjun Sarja
- Shruti
- Lokesh
- Silk Smitha
- Kovai Sarala
- Tennis Krishna
- Doddanna
- Rajanand
- Sarigama Viji
- Girija Lokesh
- M. S. Umesh
- Gundu Kalyanam

== Soundtrack ==
All the songs are composed and scored by M. M. Keeravani with the lyrics by Doddarangegowda and Sriranga.

Sl No	Song title	Singer(s)
1	"Ninnalathe Mooru Mola"	S. P. Balasubrahmanyam
2	"Yavanavva Cheluvaraya"	K. S. Chithra
3	"Nanna Ninna Antu Nantu"	Malgudi Subha
4	"Kopava Thapava"	S. P. Balsubramanyam, K. S. Chithra
5	"Baaladaari Nadeyalu"	M. M. Keeravani
