= Mudhal Udhayam =

- Directed by: Prithviraj
- Story by: Rajapandiyan
- Produced by: S. Gowry; S. Ramamurthi
- Starring: Arjun; Suman Ranganathan
- Cinematography: G. Madhavan
- Edited by: K. R. Ramalingam
- Music by: Shankar–Ganesh
- Production company: Mother Cine Productions
- Release date: 10 February 1995
- Country: India
- Language: Tamil

Mudhal Udhayam (transl. The first sunrise) is a 1995 Indian Tamil-language action film directed by Prithviraj and produced by Gawri and Ramamurthy. The film stars Arjun and Suman Ranganathan. Though completed by 1993, it was released on 10 February 1995.

== Cast ==
- Arjun as Seenu
- Suman Ranganathan as Geetha
- R. P. Vishwam as Naina
- Yuvashree
- Delhi Ganesh
- Senthil
- Vennira Aadai Moorthy as Geetha's father

== Soundtrack ==
The music was composed by the duo Shankar–Ganesh.

Song	Singer(s)	Duration
"Raasi Nalla Raasi"	Arjun	4:20
"Unakku Naan Paadum Pattu"	K. J. Yesudas	4:20
"Poongatre"	S. P. Balasubrahmanyam, K. S. Chithra	4:56
"April Maadham"	Kausalya	4:43
"Aavani Thingal"	Mano	5:14

== Release and reception ==
Mudhal Udhayam was cleared by the censor board on 7 October 1993; however delays meant that the film was released on 10 February 1995. K. Vijiyan of New Straits Times wrote, "Despite the tight censorship laws in India, crooked politicians and policemen remain favourite topics for Tamil and Telugu movie makers. Prithivaraj's attempt here is nothing much to shout about as he does not attempt a fresh angle on such occurrences."
