= Thayin Manikodi =

1998 Indian drama film

- Poster
- Directed by: Arjun
- Written by: Arjun; K. C. Thangam
- Produced by: D. Aruna; D. Sudhakar Raju
- Starring: Arjun; Tabu; Nivedita Jain
- Cinematography: K. S. Selvaraj
- Edited by: P. Sai Suresh
- Music by: Vidyasagar
- Production company: Sree Lakshmi Devi Associates
- Release date: 29 August 1998
- Running time: 152 minutes
- Country: India
- Language: Tamil

Thayin Manikodi (Note: Spelt as Thayinmanikodi on the CBFC certificate.) (transl. Mothers' jewelled flag) is a 1998 Indian Tamil-language action film written and directed by Arjun, who also stars alongside Tabu and Nivedita Jain. Featuring music composed by Vidyasagar, the film began production in late 1996 and was released on 29 August 1998.

== Plot ==
Arjun is an Indian Police Service officer who attempts to prevent confidential documents from falling into the hands of a terrorist, who intends to use them to carry out attacks in the country.

== Cast ==
- Arjun as Arjun
- Tabu as Anjali
- Nivedita Jain as Asha
- Vijayakumar
- Goundamani as Shilpa Kumar
- Rajesh Babu
- Chandrasekhar
- Vennira Aadai Moorthy
- Sowcar Janaki
- Annapoorna
- Tharun Kumar
- Rocky
- Baburaj
- Baby Shamili as Rosie
- Baby Ann
- Baby Jennifer
- Alphonsa in a special appearance
- Naren as Politician

Uncredited

- Charle
- Chinni Jayanth
- Rallapalli

== Production ==
The film was first announced in January 1996, with director and lead actor Arjun initially casting Vijayashanti in a leading role. However the actress later left the project after she had creative differences with the film's producer, Sudhakar Raju. The film began production in late 1996 and took over a year to complete. Hindi actress Tabu and model Nivedita Jain were cast in key roles, with the latter subsequently making her debut in Tamil films. The film was named after a song from Arjun's previous film, Jaihind (1994).

The film was shot extensively in foreign locations, with scenes filmed in locations in Hong Kong and Switzerland, which the team had to settle for after their visas for Canada were rejected. Further scenes were also shot in Madanapalle, Andhra Pradesh, with art director Thota Tharani constructing sets for the film. Production was delayed as a result of the FEFSI strike of 1997.

== Soundtrack ==
The soundtrack was composed by Vidyasagar.

Track listing
No.	Title	Lyrics	Singer(s)	Length
1.	"Nooraandukku Oru Murai"	Vairamuthu	Gopal Sharma, Devie Neithiyar	05:15
2.	"Adi Raani Sultana"	Vairamuthu	Mano, Devie Neithiyar	04:18
3.	"Mister Hollywood"	Vaasan	Gopal Sharma, Swarnalatha	05:06
4.	"Sixteena Seventeena"	Vairamuthu	Gopal Sharma, Swarnalatha	04:38
5.	"Uncle Uncle"	Vairamuthu	S. P. Balasubrahmanyam, Baby Sruthi Unnikrishnan, Baby Deepika	05:06
6.	"Yahaan Ladki Hai"	Palani Bharathi	Vidyasagar, Sujatha Mohan	04:26
Total length:				28:49

== Release and reception ==
The film was initially scheduled to release in November 1997 during the Diwali season, but was subsequently put on hold for several months. The film was later released in August 1998, with the title card of the film including a tribute to Nivedita Jain, who died before the film's release. The film became a commercial success at the box office.

Ji of Kalki felt Tabu and Vijayakumar were wasted but praised the action sequences. D. S. Ramanujam of The Hindu wrote that Arjun "has spent much energy to present a plausible tale (story and screenplay are also his) with all the entertainment elements, including some family sentiments. But the fine blend the director tries to achieve does not materialise".

Four years after the original release, the film was later dubbed and released in Telugu during November 2002 as Jaatiya Pattaakam.
