= Thangaikku Oru Thalattu =

- Poster
- Directed by: K. S. Madhangan
- Written by: K. S. Madhangan
- Produced by: P. Ramakrishnan
- Starring: Arjun; Seetha
- Cinematography: K. S. Mani
- Edited by: M. Kadhirvel; Kumar
- Music by: Shankar–Ganesh
- Production company: Raghavendralaya Cine Creations
- Release date: 23 November 1990
- Running time: 120 minutes
- Country: India
- Language: Tamil

Thangaikku Oru Thalattu (transl. A Lullaby To Sister) is a 1990 Indian Tamil language film directed by K. S. Madhangan. The film stars Arjun and Seetha. It was released on 23 November 1990.

== Plot ==
Gopi, a poor youth, lives with his mother and his uncle Baba. J. M. J is a businessman who cheats and kills rich people. Arun, an honest journalist, is killed by J. M. J's henchmen. Prakash, who looks like Gopi, arrests an innocent young woman, Priya. Janaki, Prakash's sister, is Priya's friend. Prakash believed that Priya was a prostitute but in a function, he knows her real identity and he apologises to Priya. Priya becomes a journalist like her brother. With Arun's written and photos evidence, she investigates on J. M. J with Prakash's help. Janaki gets married, but she and her husband die in a car accident. Prakash arrests his sister's killer, but due to the finance minister's kidnapping, he has to release him. Later, he saves the finance minister without releasing his sister's killer. Gopi's uncle reveals to Gopi the truth. Gopi had a twin brother, and his father was killed by J. M. J. Gopi is kidnapped by J. M. J to spoil Prakash's police career. He manages to escape from there. Gopi's uncle also reveals to Prakash his past. Gopi and Prakash fight against J. M. J's henchmen. Gopi dies with J. M. J.

== Cast ==
- Arjun as Gopi and Prakash
- Seetha as Priya
- K. R. Vijaya as Gopi's mother
- Ramesh Raja as J. M. J
- Renuka as Kasthuri (Stella)
- Senthil as Arumugam
- Delhi Ganesh as Arun (guest appearance)

== Soundtrack ==
The soundtrack was composed by Shankar–Ganesh, with lyrics written by Muthulingam and Shanmugham.

Song	Singer(s)	Duration
"Aadi Paadum Azhagana" (duet)	S. P. Balasubrahmanyam, S. P. Sailaja	4:30
"Aadi Paadum Azhagana" (solo)	S. P. Balasubrahmanyam	1:23
"Ennada Kadhayakeedhu"	Mano	5:02
"Seergazhi En Ooru"	S. Janaki	4:45
"Sindhupaadum"	Mano, K. S. Chithra	4:48

== Release ==
Thangaikku Oru Thalattu was released on 23 November 1990 alongside another Arjun starrer Aatha Naan Pass Ayittaen, and became a success.
