= Jaihind (1994 film) =

1994 film directed by Arjun Sarja

- Theatrical release poster
- Directed by: Arjun
- Written by: Arjun
- Produced by: S. Chain Raaj Taleda
- Starring: Arjun; Ranjitha
- Cinematography: K. S. Selvaraj
- Edited by: P. Sai Suresh
- Music by: Vidyasagar
- Production company: Mishri Entreprises
- Release date: 20 May 1994
- Running time: 150 minutes
- Country: India
- Language: Tamil
- Budget: ₹3 crore

Jaihind (transl. Victory to India!) is a 1994 Indian Tamil-language action war film written and directed by Arjun. The film stars him and Ranjitha. It was released on 20 May 1994, and became a commercial success. A spiritual successor titled Jaihind 2, also starring Arjun, was released in 2014.

== Plot ==
The movie starts with a terrorist organization funded by foreign countries to halt the growth of India, executing multiple attacks throughout the country. The Tamil Nadu state government, enraged by this sends a group of policemen to a nearby island where the terrorists are hiding out to capture them, but they end up getting martyred by the terrorists who knew of the impending attacks. It is revealed that there is a mole in the police force relaying information to the terrorist organization.

The movie then shifts to the life of ACP Bharath (Arjun), a highly patriotic police officer in love with Priya (Ranjitha), who is also a policewoman and the daughter of an influential figure (Charuhasan). Bharath kills one of the terorrists in one such encounter and is appreciated by the force and people alike. Meanwhile, the terrorists continue their strikes and in one of them, they assassinate the Chief Minister of Tamil Nadu. Sriram (Devan), Bharath's brother is killed while trying to capture the killer.

Driven by his loss and his patriotism, Bharath takes over a mission to stop the terrorists before they wreak more havoc. However, the mole relays the information to the terrorists immediately and his family gets death threats. Trusting nobody, he then devises a plan and pretends to quit the force in front of his colleagues and covertly takes over the mission with backing from his higher officials. And for the mission, instead of leading a group of cops, he takes Priya, Kottaisamy (Goundamani), and a group of prisoners serving death penalty along with him on the mission to keep the mission a secret.

He then leads the team to the island and the group faces many hurdles while on the mission and learn that the terrorist in conjunction with Mr. X (surprise reveal) are plotting an attack on world peace leader Maria Devi on world unity day to damage India's reputation worldwide and start a global communal war. How they overcome all the challenges and succeed in the mission forms the rest of the story.

== Cast ==
- Arjun as ACP Bharath IPS
- Ranjitha as Inspector Priya
- Goundamani as Head constable Kottaisamy
- Manorama as Bharath's mother
- Senthil in dual role as Kottaisamy's dream and DIG
- Major Sundarrajan as Ravichandran
- Kalyan Kumar as the Chief Minister of Tamil Nadu
- Devan as Sriram, Bharath's brother
- Rajesh as Seenivasan
- Pandari Bai as Maria Devi
- Chandrasekhar as Sekhar
- Vaishnavi as Susila
- Charuhasan as Priya's father
- Chokkalinga Bhagavathar
- Idichapuli Selvaraj as a police constable
- Vimalraj as the terrorist leader
- Bayilvan Ranganathan as Inspector
- Gowtham as Gowtham
- Kamala Kamesh
- Baby Vichitra

Cameo appearances

- Kavithasri
- Raju Sundaram

== Soundtrack ==
The music was composed by Vidyasagar, with lyrics written by Vairamuthu. The song "Thayin Manikodi" remains hugely popular and is frequently played during Independence Day. It inspired the title of a 1998 film also directed by and starring Arjun.

Song	Singer(s)	Duration
"Bodhai Yeri Pocchu"	S. P. Sailaja, Suresh Peters	4:29
"Kanna En Selai"	S. Janaki, S. P. Balasubrahmanyam	4:53
"Muttham Thara"	Mano, Sindhu	3:22
"Thanni Vachu"	Malgudi Subha, Vidyasagar, Arjun	4:49
"Thayin Manikodi"	S. P. Balasubrahmanyam	4:26

== Reception ==
K. Vijiyan of New Straits Times wrote, "The strong family theme helps prop up all the action scenes and makes it different from just another Rambo-style movie." R. P. R. of Kalki wrote that Arjun has done a one man show like Seshan, but felt that Arjun has messed up in aspects like music, calling it torture, keeping lengthy dialogues and the poor choice of actor as antagonist. He concluded that one must appreciate the makers for the fact that they have made a point, but sighed at the fact that they did not know how to convey it.
