= Pratap (1993 film) =

- Theatrical release poster
- Directed by: Arjun
- Written by: Arjun
- Produced by: Arjun
- Starring: Arjun; Khushbu
- Cinematography: R. H. Ashok
- Edited by: P. Sai Suresh
- Music by: Maragathamani
- Production company: Sree Raam Films International
- Distributed by: Sree Raam Films International
- Release date: 16 April 1993
- Running time: 120 minutes
- Country: India
- Language: Tamil

Pratap (/prəθɑːp/) is a 1993 Indian Tamil-language action film written, directed and produced by Arjun via Sree Raam Films International. The film stars Arjun himself, Khushbu, Janagaraj, Devan and Rocky. It was released on 16 April 1993.

== Plot ==
Pratap is released from prison, and he learns that his sister Priya is missing. After initial efforts, Pratap finds Priya in a mental asylum and learns that she was the witness behind the crimes committed by brothers: Vimal, Michael and Alex Raj. Priya finally recovers and she reports the Raj brothers' crimes to the media and an arrest warrant is issued. However, the Raj brothers corner Priya and kill her, which enrages Pratap. He finally kills the Raj brothers after an intense combat, thus avenging his sister, Priya's death.

== Cast ==
- Arjun as Pratap
- Khushbu as Anjali
- Janagaraj as Rajappa
- Captain Raju
- Devan as Michael Raj
- Vennira Aadai Moorthy
- Senthil
- Rocky as Alex Raj
- J. D. Chakravarthy as Vimal Raj
- Prabhu Deva as a dancer in "Maanga Maanga"
- Anju as Priya
- C. R. Saraswathi

== Soundtrack ==
The music was composed by Maragathamani, with lyrics by Vairamuthu. For the Telugu dubbed version Muta Rowdy, all lyrics were written by Rajasri.

Tamil
No.	Title	Singer(s)	Length
1.	"Maanga Maanga"	S. P. Balasubrahmanyam, Maragathamani	4:18
2.	"En Kannanuku Kaadhal"	S. P. Balasubrahmanyam, K. S. Chithra	4:39
3.	"Solli Adi Raja"	S. P. Balasubrahmanyam, K. S. Chithra	4:45
4.	"Mandil Oru Paatu"	S. P. Balasubrahmanyam, K. S. Chithra	4:37
5.	"Arjunare Arjunare"	S. P. Balasubrahmanyam, K. S. Chithra	4:47
6.	"Raathire Nerathil"	K. S. Chithra	4:58
Total length:			28:04

Telugu
No.	Title	Singer(s)	Length
1.	"Nene Neeku Raja"	S. P. Balasubrahmanyam, K. S. Chithra	4:43
2.	"Banti Banti Chamanti"	S. P. Balasubrahmanyam, Chorus	4:16
3.	"Naa Kannulake"	S. P. Balasubrahmanyam, K. S. Chithra	4:35
4.	"Arjunada ! Arjunada"	S. P. Balasubrahmanyam, K. S. Chithra	4:35
5.	"Ratiri Vela"	K. S. Chithra	4:47
6.	"Padenu Oka Pata"	S. P. Balasubrahmanyam, K. S. Chithra	4:31
Total length:			27:30

== Release and reception ==
Pratap was released on 16 April 1993, by Sree Raam Films International. The Indian Express wrote the film "is tailormade for Arjun", appreciating the action sequences and Rocky's performance as the antagonist but criticising the music as average.
