= Vedham =

2001 film

- DVD cover
- Directed by: Arjun
- Written by: Arjun
- Produced by: Arjun
- Starring: Arjun; Sakshi; Vineeth; Divyaa Unni; Mumtaj
- Cinematography: Ramesh Babu
- Edited by: P. Saisuresh; Joel Jayakumar
- Music by: Vidyasagar
- Production company: Sree Raam Films International
- Release date: 22 August 2001
- Running time: 140 minutes
- Country: India
- Language: Tamil

Vedham (/veɪðəm/) (transl. Veda) is a 2001 Indian Tamil-language romantic drama film written, produced, and directed by Arjun via Sree Raam Films International. The film stars himself, Sakshi, Vineeth, and Divyaa Unni, while Mumtaj, Goundamani, and Senthil play important roles. The music was composed by Vidyasagar. The film was released on 22 August 2001. Actor Vishal worked as one of the assistant directors in the film.

== Plot ==
Sanjay and Anitha are a married couple living in Coimbatore but are on the verge of getting divorced. Vijay, a friend of Sanjay, understands the situation and decides to patch them together. Vijay travels to Sanjay's home and stays with the couple for a few weeks. During their conversations, Vijay keeps describing about his wife Seetha, two kids, and his joyful marriage life. Slowly, Sanjay and Anitha understand each other and want to lead a happy life similar to Vijay and Seetha. Finally, it is revealed that all the stories told by Vijay are just his imagination so that it would inspire Sanjay and Anitha to reconcile. The truth is that Vijay was in love with Seetha, but she accidentally died before their wedding and Vijay lives her memories. However, he ensures that Sanjay and Anitha do not get to know the truth. In the end, Sanjay and Anitha get united. Vijay leaves to his home in Chennai with the satisfaction of solving Sanjay's problems.

== Cast ==
- Arjun as Vijay
- Sakshi as Seetha
- Vineeth as Sanjay
- Divyaa Unni as Anitha Sanjay
- Mumtaj as Pooja
- Goundamani as Govindsamy
- Senthil
- Visu
- Vennira Aadai Moorthy
- Chinni Jayanth
- Mayilsamy
- Vijay Krishnaraj
- Chokkalinga Bhagavathar
- Dinesh as dancer in "Hey Meenalochani"
- Sridhar as dancer in "Hey Meenalochani"

== Soundtrack ==
The soundtrack was composed by Vidyasagar.

For "Malai kaatru" song Vidyasagar used his own tune from "Oru raathri" song from Malayalam movie Summer in bethlehem.

Song	Singers	Lyrics
"Hey Meenalochani"	Shankar Mahadevan, Swarnalatha	Pa. Vijay
"Konji Konji Pesi"	S. P. Balasubrahmanyam	Pa. Vijay
"Malai Kaatru"	Hariharan, Mahalakshmi Iyer	Vairamuthu
"Mudhal Poo"	Hariharan, Sujatha	Pa. Vijay
"Oh Anbe"	Shankar Mahadevan	Pa. Vijay
"Umma Ayya"	Annupamaa, Sriram Parthasarathy	Pa. Vijay

== Critical reception ==
Sify wrote, "Vedham is sleep inducing. Arjun should stick to patriotism, guns and scantly clad girls dancing in ribaldry. But here he wants to experiment with the idea – "To be in love for ever" but ends up making an insufferable film that leaves you with a migraine'. Malathi Rangarajan of The Hindu wrote, "Generally it is patriotism that is the underlying theme of Arjun's films. But in Vedham he deviates much, to talk about the sanctity of the institution of marriage and glorify the familial unit. The message is loud and clear – so clear that it turns didactic".

Visual Dasan of Kalki praised the fights of Arjun, performances of actors, uncomplicated screenplay by narrating small flashbacks, Saisuresh's editing and realistic dialogues but felt Vidyasagar's hard work was wasted due to songs being forced and concluded saying barring a few sudden cinematic twists, this celluloid class Room is a must-have for today. Malini Mannath of Chennai Online wrote, "The film moves at an interesting pace, promisingly enough, during the first part. But then Arjun, who has taken on the burden of writing, directing, producing, and playing the central role – a burden which seems to sit a bit too heavily on him – loses track of his main theme and drifts into the song-dance-fight routine".
