= Niranjan Sudhindra =

Indian actor

- Born: 20 August 1996 (age 30); Bangalore, Karnataka, India
- Occupation: Actor
- Years active: 2009–present

Niranjan Sudhindra (born 20 August 1996) is an Indian actor who works in Kannada films. He made his debut as a child actor in Bellary Naga (2009).

== Early life ==
Niranjan Sudhindra was born to Sudhindra Kumar B.M. and Veena S.K. He is the nephew of Upendra. He has a younger brother Nidarshan.

Niranjan Sudhindra grew up in Bangalore and graduated in Business Administration from PES University. As a student he was drawn to acting and western dance. He acted in many plays and was part of a theatre troupe Thaksh theatrics. He also took part in dance competitions held in Mumbai, Kolkata and Bangalore.

== Career ==
In 2018, Niranjan began his adult acting career with 2nd Half, a crime thriller directed by Yogi Devagange. The film also stars his aunt Priyanka Upendra and Niranjan plays a prominent role.

Niranjan's debut film as a lead was Namma Hudugaru (2022), directed by H.B. Siddu, and he played the lead role opposite Radhya. A romantic drama set in a village, the movie evoked mixed reviews among the critics. However, Niranjan’s individual performance as Barma, a happy-go-lucky college student, was appreciated.

Niranjan's next feature film Superstar was directed by Ramesh Venkatesh Babu, and he plays the role of a dancer who becomes a household name. He is paired with social media sensation Zaara Yesmin, who is making her debut in Kannada. This film has improvised the title of his uncle Upendra’s 2002 hit Super Star, and is said to be a commercial entertainer with lots of song and dance numbers. Raghavendra V is the music director and Chethan Kumar has penned the lyrics. Yash will be doing voiceover for the film teaser. Niranjan’s upcoming projects include Hunter: On Duty, directed by Vinay Krishna. He will be the lead actor and paired with Sowmya Menon. He has also signed a movie Q, an action thriller, directed by Nagashekar.

== Filmography ==
Key
†	Denotes films that have not yet been released

Year	Film	Role	Notes
2009	Bellary Naga		
2018	2nd Half	Niru	
2022	Namma Hudugaru	Barma	
2026	Seetha Payanam	Abhi	Telugu film
2026	Spark	Abhiram	
