= Jaihind 2 =

2014 Indian film by Arjun Sarja

- Poster in Tamil
- Directed by: Arjun Sarja
- Written by: Arjun Sarja; G. K. Gopinath (Tamil / Telugu dialogues)
- Produced by: Arjun Sarja
- Starring: Arjun Sarja; Surveen Chawla; Charlotte Claire; Rahul Dev
- Cinematography: H. C. Venugopal
- Edited by: Kay Kay
- Music by: Arjun Janya
- Production company: Sree Raam Films International
- Release date: 7 November 2014
- Running time: 155 minutes
- Country: India
- Languages: Kannada; Tamil; Telugu

Jaihind 2 (also known in Tamil as Arjunin Jaihind 2) is a 2014 Indian action drama film written, produced and directed by Arjun Sarja, who also stars in the lead role. It is the sequel of his previous film Jai Hind, and was simultaneously made in Telugu and Kannada with the latter titled as Abhimanyu.

Jaihind 2 and Abhimanyu was released on 7 November 2014, and became a commercial success in Kannada, but did not perform well in Tamil and Telugu. The film's Kannada version won the Karnataka State Film Award for Second Best Film.

The film explores India becoming a superpower, as it appeared in A. P. J. Abdul Kalam's dreams and also tries to tackle the issues in the education system.

== Plot ==
Abhimanyu, a computer engineer and martial artist, gets disturbed by the death of a poor child's parents due to moneymaking schemes of private schools, where he sets out to fight for the rights of children to free and compulsory education.

== Cast ==
Actor (Tamil)	Actor (Telugu)	Actor (Kannada)	Role (Tamil)	Role (Telugu)	Role (Kannada)
Arjun Sarja			Abhimanyu	Abhimanyu	Abhimanyu
Surveen Chawla			Nandhini	Nandhini	Nandhini
Charlotte Claire			Simran	Simran	Simran
Rahul Dev					
Brahmanandam		Jahangir			
Mayilsamy	Ali	P. D. Sathish Chandra			
Manobala	Raghu Babu	Raghu Babu	Nandhini's father	Nandhini's father	Nandhini's father
Vinaya Prasad			Nandhini's mother	Nandhini's mother	Nandhini's mother
Ravi Kale			Inspector R. Ravindranath	Inspector R. Ravindranath	Inspector R. Ravindranath
Atul Mathur			Vikram Tagore	Vikram Tagore	Vikram Tagore
Bose Venkat			Ramnath	Ramnath	Ramnath
Amit Tiwari					
Master Bharath			Students	Students	Students
Trinethrudu			Students	Students	Students
Pawan			Students	Students	Students
Aadithya Saini			Students	Students	Students
Sruthi Raaj			Students	Students	Students
Shruti Reddy			Students	Students	Students
Yuvina Parthavi			Parvathi	Parvathi	Parvathi
Amrutha			Student	Student	Student
Shafi			Chandru	Chandu	Chandra
Biradar			Parvathi's grandfather	Parvathi's grandfather	Parvathi's grandfather
Ashok Mandanna			All India Private School Owners Association president	All India Private School Owners Association president	All India Private School Owners Association president
Gowtham Sundararajan			All India Private School Owners Association owner	All India Private School Owners Association owner	All India Private School Owners Association owner
Ravindranath KS			Private School Association Member	Private School Association Member	Private School Association Member
Siva Narayana Murthy			Army officer	Army officer	Army officer
Narasimha Raju			Private School Association Member	Private School Association Member	Private School Association Member
Gana Bala			Special appearances in the song "Ayya Padichavare" / "Ayya Chandruda" / "Kathala Manayolage"		
Sampath Ram			Special appearances in the song "Ayya Padichavare" / "Ayya Chandruda" / "Kathala Manayolage"		
Scissor Manohar			Special appearances in the song "Ayya Padichavare" / "Ayya Chandruda" / "Kathala Manayolage"		
Jahangir		—	Special appearances in the song "Ayya Padichavare" / "Ayya Chandruda" / "Kathala Manayolage"		
Yogi Babu			Private School Association Member (uncredited)	Private School Association Member (uncredited)	Private School Association Member (uncredited)
Prakash Shenoy			Uncredited	Uncredited	Uncredited
Sujatha			Abhimanyu's mother (in portrait)	Abhimanyu's mother (in portrait)	Abhimanyu's mother (in portrait)

Tamil version

- Brahmanandam as Ezhumalai
- Mayilsamy as Kulfi Gopalan

Kannada version

- Master Manjunath as Karate Master
- Tumkur Mohan as Prisoner (uncredited)
- M. N. Suresh as Prisoner (uncredited)

== Production ==
The film shoot was launched on 9 June 2013 in a grand manner in Mumbai and budgeted at ₹20 crore. The huge set resembling a jail was erected by art director Sasidhar at a cost of ₹25 lakh. A high-octane action sequence was filmed in a former army facility in Bangkok.

== Soundtrack ==
All music is composed by Arjun Janya.

Kannada Track listing
No.	Title	Lyrics	Singer(s)	Length
1.	"Hriva Ninna Naguva"	Jayant Kaikini	Karthik, Saindhavi	4:00
2.	"Ivan Yaarivano"	K. Kalyan	Karthik, Priya	4:01
3.	"Kathala Manayolage"	V. Nagendra Prasad	L. N. Shastry, Rajesh Krishnan	5:13
4.	"Naguve Manasaara"	Arjun Sarja	Ravi Varma	1:20
Total length:				14:34

Tamil Track listing
No.	Title	Lyrics	Singer(s)	Length
1.	"Ayya Padichavare"	Vairamuthu	Gana Bala, Rajesh Krishnan	5:14
2.	"Mazhalai Malaraaga"	Ilakkiyan	Ravi Varma	1:20
3.	"Ivan Yaarivan"	Pa. Vijay	Karthik, Priya	4:02
4.	"Adada Nenjil Adada"	Pa. Vijay	Karthik, Saindhavi	4:00
Total length:				14:36

Telugu Track listing

- "Edige Ma Chinni" - Ravi Varma
- "Idi Pranayama" - Karthik
- "Manasa Nee Madhurima" - Saindhavi
- "Ayya Chandruda" - Manikka Vinayagam

== Critical reception ==
=== Jaihind 2 ===
Baradwaj Rangan of The Hindu stated "Arjunin Jai Hind 2 is the kind of film about which you shrug and say, “Well, if you liked Jai Hind…”. If you have to watch a film about a one-man army, you could do worse than watch one with Arjun in it. He totally pulls it off". The Times of India gave 2.5 stars out of 5 and wrote, "For most parts, Arjunin Jai Hind 2 plays like a collage of various Arjun films...What's interesting, however, is that instead of telling his story as a straightforward narrative, Arjun presents it as events from the lives of different individuals who come into Abhimanyu's life...The problem with the film is that it tells a predictable story and in a rather longwinded manner".

The New Indian Express wrote, "The film conveys a relevant message, but one that could have been better executed. The saving grace is Arjun who has penned the plot and screenplay, directed and produced the film. The actor tackles his role with cool intensity. His physique well toned, the action king is a delight to watch in the fights-stunt scenes as he packs a powerful punch at his tormentors. If only his screenplay had matched the lofty message". Rediff gave 2 stars out of 5 and wrote, "Unfortunately, Arjun fails as a director. Despite the good storyline, he struggles to keep the audience involved. The real issue seems lost in all the unnecessary twists and drama surrounding the characters. Patriotic action dramas have been his forte, but Jai Hind 2 neither creates empathy for the characters and their situation, nor has entertainment value".

=== Abhimanyu ===
Bangalore Mirror wrote, "Abhimanyu may not be unique in how the story is told, but the idea is novel and is appealing enough". The New Indian Express wrote "Abhimanyu is a taut action film with a strong social message. The subject would not have lost its grip if he was a little focussed on what exactly he wanted to say. However, Arjun has put enough effort into the film to make it a worthy one-time watch".
