= Ezhumalai =

2002 film by Arjun Sarja

- Poster
- Directed by: Arjun
- Written by: K. C. Thangam (Dialogues); Arjun; Chinni Krishna (story)
- Based on: Narasimha Naidu (Telugu)
- Produced by: V. Ravichandran; S.Amaravathy
- Starring: Arjun; Simran; Gajala; Mumtaj
- Cinematography: K. S. Selvaraj
- Edited by: P. Sai Suresh
- Music by: Mani Sharma
- Production company: Sri Venkateswara Production
- Distributed by: Aascar Film
- Release date: 21 June 2002
- Running time: 167 minutes
- Country: India
- Language: Tamil

Ezhumalai (transl. Seven hills) (Note: Also the title character.) is a 2002 Indian Tamil-language action drama film directed by Arjun, who also plays the title character. It also features an ensemble cast of Simran, Gajala, Mumtaj, Vijayakumar and Ashish Vidyarthi. It is the Tamil remake of the Telugu film Narasimha Naidu (2001) which also starred Simran and has music by Mani Sharma.

Ezhumalai was released on 21 June 2002 and became a commercial success. It was dubbed into Telugu as Simha Baludu. K. S. Selvaraj won the Cinema Express Award for Best Cameraman.

== Plot ==
A feud between two neighbouring villages ensues, where Venkatachalam and Kalingarayan are rivals. Since Venkatachalam is a peace-loving person, their village is suppressed under the toe of malice Kalingarayan. He squats the fields of their Lakshmi Narasimha temple. Looking ahead, Venkatachalam plans to build an army for which he orders to sacrifice a male child from a family, and accords his younger son Ezhumalai.

Years later, Anjali, the pampered daughter of a savage factionist Nagalingam, grows at her maternal uncle’s house. She is later inspired by Ezhumalai, who manages a dance school. Anjali joins as his student and develops feelings for him despite knowing that he is a widower with a son. However, Nagalingam fixes Anjali’s alliance with his nephew, who is the son of Kalingarayan. Anjali later declares her love for Ezhumalai. Knowing this, the bridegroom moves to take hold of Anjali. Ezhumalai and Anjali boards the same train when the bridegroom's henchmen chase after them. At that point, a furious Ezhumalai reveals himself, where the henchmen escape out of fear. Later, Ezhumalai learns about Anjali's identity and reveals his past.

After forming an army, Ezhumalai grows up as a gallant, who warns Kalingarayan to be on terms. On the eve of the celebrations, Kalingarayan onrushes where Ezhumalai slays him. Being cognizant of it, Nagalingam pledges to destroy Ezhumalai and his family. Venkatachalam decides to search a bride for Ezhumalai. He selects Lakshmi, who is a generous woman and sensitive to violence. Nevertheless, Venkatachalam conducts their marriage by concealing his son’s occupation, but Lakshmi realises the fact and bends to his goodness. Later, Ezhumalai's three siblings arrive from abroad along with their families who are conceited and negligent. However, Ezhumalai endears and adulation them a lot, but they always snide at him.

Lakshmi fails to receive and retorts. Listening to this, Ezhumalai exiles her when she reaches her parents' house and gives birth to a boy. Later, Ezhumalai’s brothers are about to return without viewing the newborn baby and refuse to accompany them. While travelling, they are onslaught by Nagalingam’s men, but Ezhumalai secures his family, keeping his life at risk, and safely sends them off. They realise his virtue and plead pardon after soul-searching. Simultaneously, Nagalingam attempts to kill Ezhumalai's son, where Lakshmi is stabbed while guarding him. Before leaving her breath, she implores Ezhumalai to get rid of this climate, which Venkatachalam also convinces him about the same.

In the present, an enraged Nagalingam attacks Venkatachalam but is struck seeing Ezhumalai (who has returned to his hometown). Ezhumalai hands over Anjali to him. During this, Ezhumalai's son spells his first words, calling Anjali as his mother. Later, Venkatachalam initiates Ezhumalai to bring Anjali as a mother to his child. Anjali’s wedding arrangements are in progress, where Ezhumalai uproars Nagalingam fixing his match with Anjali and challenges him to block him. He cracks down on the day of the marriage and perceives the presence of Anjali at the hospital, who has removed her uterus as a sacrifice not to have an offspring. At last, Ezhumalai finally accepts Anjali wholeheartedly.

== Cast ==
- Arjun as Ezhumalai
- Simran as Lakshmi
- Gajala as Anjali Nagalingam
- Mumtaj as Sandhya, Lakshmi's sister
- Vijayakumar as Venkatachalam, Ezhumalai's father
- Ashish Vidhyarthi as Nagalingam, Anjali's father
- Anandaraj as Nagalingam's brother-in-law (Adangoppan Thamirabaranila Thala Muzhuga)
- Keerikkadan Jose as Kalingarayan,Nagalingam's younger brother
- Chandrasekhar as Venkatachalam's friend
- Sathyapriya as Nagalingam's sister
- Gowtham Sundararajan as Ezhumalai's elder brother
- Thyagu as Ezhumalai's elder brother
- Vennira Aadai Moorthy as Marriage Broker
- Peeli Sivam as Lakshmi and Sandhya's father
- Charle as Ezhumalai's assistant
- Vaiyapuri as Marriage Broker's assistant
- Scissor Manohar as Drummer

== Production ==
A fight sequence was shot at a temple at Kumbakonam for three days while another scene was shot at a bungalow in Chennai.

== Soundtrack ==
The songs are by Mani Sharma.

Song	Singers	Lyrics	Length
"Chillendru"	S. P. Balasubrahmanyam, Sujatha	Vaali	05:21
"Ella Malaiyilum"	Karthik, K. S. Chithra	Vaali	05:28
"Lux Papa"	S. P. Balasubrahmanyam, Swarnalatha	Vaali	05:07
"Maina Kunjo"	Shankar Mahadevan, Sujatha	Vaali	04:23
"Un Punnagai"	Mallikarjun, Harini	Thamarai	04:34

== Critical reception ==
Malathi Rangarajan of The Hindu wrote "The screenplay is Arjun's. So is the direction. And the action hero thrills his fans with stunts aplenty. Yet fights alone, however well choreographed, cannot make a film watchable. You need a well-narrated story — something "Ezhumalai" lacks. Most of the time action waits for no reason and seems to need no logic." Sify wrote that "the film caters strictly to the frontbenchers". Cinesouth wrote "The film is full of blood, gore, fights, unimpactful scenes and an ancient story. These make 'Ezumalai' unworthy of devoted viewing". Malini Mannath of Chennai Online wrote "A remake of the Balkrishna-starrer 'Narasimhanaidu', the film was a record -breaker in the original version. Arjun, after 'Vedam's failure, seems rather desperate to make it work this time round with a remake of a proven subject. The desperation shows and somewhere along the way he seems to have lost focus".
