= Aishwarya Arjun =

Indian actress

- Born: Bengaluru, Karnataka, India
- Occupation: Actress
- Years active: 2013–present
- Spouse: Umapathy Ramaiah (m. 2024)
- Parent(s): Arjun Sarja; Niveditha
- Relatives: Sarja family

Aishwarya Arjun is an Indian actress who has acted in Tamil, Kannada and Telugu films. She made her film debut in the film Pattathu Yaanai in 2013. She is known for sporadically appearing in films and collaborating with her father, Arjun Sarja.

== Personal life ==
Aishwarya Arjun was born in Bengaluru, Karnataka to film actor and director Arjun Sarja and former actress Niveditha Arjun. She has a younger sister, Anjana.

She and Umapathy Ramaiah tied the knot on 10 June 2024 in an intimate ceremony at Arjun's Sri Yoga Anjaneyar Temple in Gerugambakkam, Chennai.

== Career ==
Aishwarya did an acting course at Anupam Kher's school and made her debut in the Tamil film Pattathu Yaanai co-starring Vishal. Her role in the film received mixed reviews with most critics citing that she "does not have much to do".

Her next film was the Kannada-Tamil bilingual film Prema Baraha directed by her father.

== Filmography ==
Year	Film	Role	Language	Notes
2013	Pattathu Yaanai	Aishwarya	Tamil	Tamil debut
2018	Prema Baraha	Madhu	Kannada	Kannada debut; Nominated - SIIMA Award for Best Debutant Actor in a Leading Role (Female) - Kannada
2018	Sollividava	Madhu	Tamil	
2026	Seetha Payanam	Seetha	Telugu	Telugu debut
