= Prema Baraha =

2018 film directed by Arjun Sarja

- Theatrical release poster in Kannada
- Directed by: Arjun Sarja
- Written by: Arjun Sarja
- Produced by: Niveditha Arjun
- Starring: Chandan Kumar; Aishwarya Arjun
- Cinematography: H. C. Venugopal
- Edited by: Kay Kay
- Music by: Jassie Gift
- Production company: Sree Raam Films International
- Release date: 9 February 2018
- Country: India
- Languages: Kannada; Tamil

Prema Baraha (transl. Script of love) in Kannada / Sollividava (transl. Shall I say it) in Tamil is a 2018 Indian romantic drama film written and directed by Arjun Sarja. It was produced by his wife Niveditha Arjun under his home studio of Sree Raam Films International and made simultaneously in Kannada and Tamil languages. The film stars Chandan Kumar and Aishwarya Arjun (in her Kannada debut) with different ensemble casts for the two versions. Jassie Gift composed the soundtrack and score. H. C. Venugopal was the director of photography and Kay Kay edited the film. The two versions of the film were released worldwide on 9 February 2018. It had a grand opening and became a commercial success at the box office of Karnataka, but had a decent run in Tamil.

== Plot ==
Sanjay (Chandan Kumar) and Madhu (Aishwarya Arjun) are two journalists from rival news organizations who do not have the best equation. However, when the two of them are forced to work together while covering the Kargil War, a bond is forged between them.

== Cast ==
Actor (Kannada)	Actor (Tamil)	Role
Chandan Kumar		Sanjay
Aishwarya Arjun		Madhu
Suhasini		Madhu's aunt
K. Viswanath		Seenu
Prakash Raj		Army man's father
Avinash		Ram
Sadhu Kokila	Sathish	Sanjay's friend
Pandi		Sanjay's friend
O. A. K. Sundar		Subhendar Ganesan
K. Viswanath		Seenu
Rangayana Raghu	Rajendran	Narayana
Mandya Ramesh	Manobala	Apartment president
Kuri Prathap	Yogi Babu	Madhu's friend
Kuri Prathap	Bonda Mani	Madhu's friend
Jeet Raidutt		Jeet
—N/a	Nellai Siva	Traffic police officer
Arjun Sarja		Special appearance in "Jai Hanumantha"/Flight captain
Darshan	Shobi Paulraj	special appearance in "Jai Hanumantha"
Chiranjeevi Sarja	Shobi Paulraj	special appearance in "Jai Hanumantha"
Dhruva Sarja	Shobi Paulraj	special appearance in "Jai Hanumantha"

== Production ==
In December 2015, Arjun announced that he was set to produce and direct a bilingual Kannada and Tamil romantic film featuring his daughter Aishwarya Arjun in the lead role. He had initially narrated three stories to his daughter, who was most satisfied with a script on two journalists falling in love during the Kargil War of 1999. While he was working on the screenplay, Arjun spent a week in the studios of Asian News International and went through all the material they had on Kargil. Kannada actor Chetan Kumar was signed on to feature as the lead actor in the project, thus making his debut in Tamil films. In May 2016, Chetan Kumar backed out of the project, unhappy with his characterisation in the film, and was replaced by another Kannada actor, Chandan Kumar. For her particular role, Aishwarya Arjun carefully observed the style and characteristics of Barkha Dutt who worked as a journalist during the 1999 conflict.

The film was launched in May 2016 with promotional stills from a shoot released shortly after. The film's first schedule was completed in July 2016 with Suhasini and K. Viswanath also joining the cast. It was then shot in Dharamsala, Chennai, Hyderabad, Kerala, Mumbai, Switzerland, and Italy. In August 2017, the Tamil title was changed from Kadhalin Ponveedhiyil to Sollividava. The Kannada title of Prema Baraha is derived from Arjun Sarja's song Prema Baraha Koti Taraha from the film Prathap (1990).

== Soundtrack ==
Prema Baraha

Soundtrack album by Jassie Gift
- Released: 2017
- Recorded: 2017
- Genre: Feature film soundtrack
- Labels: U1 Records (Tamil); Divo (Tamil/Kannada)
- Producer: Jassie Gift

Jassie Gift chronology
Chicken Kokkachi (2017)	Prema Baraha (2017)	Jani (2017)

Jassie Gift has composed the score and songs for the film, with Divo releasing the soundtrack in Kannada and U1 Records in Tamil. The heroine introduction theme included in the album was composed by Aruldev. The title track of both versions are based on the song "Prema Baraha" from the Kannada film Prathap (1990). The song was also reused in the Tamil film Captain Magal as "Yarumillai".

Kannada version

Track list
No.	Title	Lyrics	Singer(s)	Length
1.	"Prema Baraha"	Hamsalekha	Armaan Malik, Palak Muchhal	5:05
2.	"Manase Manase"	Arjun, Kaviraj	M. M. Keeravani, Harini	5:16
3.	"Jai Hanumantha"	Vijaya Narasimha, Gotturi	S. P. Balasubrahmanyam, Tippu	5:07
4.	"Rama Rama"	V. Nagendra Prasad	Haricharan, Anitha Karthikeyan	3:58
5.	"Paan Banaras"	Ghouse Peer	Karthik, Priya Himesh	4:12
6.	"Prema Baraha (Mashup mix)"	—	Jassie Gift, Arjun Sarja, Chandan Shetty, Harini	2:48
7.	"Manase Manase (Solo)"	Arjun, Kaviraj	M. M. Keeravani	5:15
8.	"Introduction theme"	—	Instrumental	1:15

Tamil version

Track list
No.	Title	Lyrics	Singer(s)	Length
1.	"Mashup Mix"	—	Jassie Gift, Arjun Sarja, Chandan Shetty	2:48
2.	"Uyire Uyire"	Madhan Karky	G. V. Prakash Kumar, Harini	5:16
3.	"Jai Hanumantha"	Vijaya Narasimha, Gotturi	S. P. Balasubrahmanyam, Tippu	5:07
4.	"Rama Rama"	Viveka	Haricharan, Anitha Karthikeyan	3:58
5.	"Paan Banaras"	Pa. Vijay	Karthik, Priya Himesh	4:12
6.	"Uyire Uyire (Solo)"	Madhan Karky	G. V. Prakash Kumar, Harini	5:15
7.	"Heroine Introduction Music"	—	Instrumental	1:15
8.	"Sollividava"	Madhan Karky	Sathyaprakash Dharmar, Harini	5:03

== Critical reception ==
=== Kannada version ===
A critic from The Times of India wrote that "Watch this film if you're a fan of the stereotypical commercial fare, replete with comedy, sentiments, action and romance". A critic from Deccan Chronicle opined that "Unfortunately, the brilliant actor Arjun Sarja falls short in deploying the right force and making use of the right kind of ammunition for this kind of lovely mission".

=== Tamil version ===
A critic from The Hindu said that "What lets the film down is Arjun's unfocussed writing, un-missable lectures on nationalism and using stock Kargil war footage liberally instead of staging the war". A critic from The New Indian Express stated that "On the whole, it's just a run-of-the-mill romantic film which has almost no redeeming factors".
