= Simhada Mari Sainya =

- Film VCD cover
- Directed by: Rajendra Singh Babu
- Written by: Harish Vinayak Subba Rao
- Produced by: Nathan Robinson Somashankar; Thomas Suryaraj Nagaprakash
- Starring: Arjun Sarja; Amrish Puri
- Cinematography: Prathap Singh Prakash
- Edited by: Karthik Balu
- Music by: Satyam
- Production company: S. R. S. Productions
- Distributed by: Varuna Films
- Release date: 31 July 1981
- Running time: 142 minutes
- Country: India
- Language: Kannada

Simhada Mari Sainya (transl. Army of lion cubs) is a 1981 Indian Kannada- language children's film directed by Rajendra Singh Babu. It stars Arjun Sarja (credited as Master Arjun Sarja), Amrish Puri, Baby Indira, Baby Rekha and an ensemble of other child actors. It won two awards at the 1981–82 Karnataka State Film Awards — Best Editor (K. Balu) and Best Female Child Actor (Baby Rekha). The film is notable for a scene that involves Arjun Sarja clinging onto a helicopter hovering at a height of 500 feet above the ground. The film was selected for the Paris and Moscow International Film Festivals. Later it was dubbed in Hindi as Aaj Ke Sholey by Jaya Bachchan.

== Plot ==
A group of children, led by James and Arjun, journey into a forest to rescue the two daughters of their friend's sisters kidnapped by Gupta.

== Cast ==
- Arjun Sarja as Arjun
- Master Bhanuprakash as James
- Amrish Puri as Gupta
- Jayanthi as Triveni
- Sundar Krishna Urs
- Fighter Shetty
- Baby Indira
- Master Prasanna Kumar
- Baby Rekha
- Master Arjun

Cameos

- Manjula as Herself
- Dwarakish as Himself
- Shivaram

== Production ==
Arjun's father Shakti Prasad, did not want his son to become an actor and turned down film offers that Arjun began to receive as a teenager. In a surprise move, film producer Rajendra Singh Babu managed to convince Arjun, then 17 year old boy to begin shooting for a feature film for his production house without Shakti Prasad's express permission and consequently, his father agreed to Arjun's career choice and the featured him as a junior artiste and the director of the film gave him the stage name of Arjun, replacing his original name Ashok Babu. He performed a risky stunt of hanging from a helicopter which is above 500 feet.

== Soundtrack ==
Simhada Mari Sainya

Soundtrack album by Satyam
- Released: 1981
- Genre: Feature film soundtrack
- Label: Saregama

Satyam composed the background score and the music for the soundtracks in the album.

Track list
| No. | Title | Lyrics | Singer(s) | Length |
|---|---|---|---|---|
| 1. | "Idly Vade Sambar" | | S. P. Balasubrahmanyam |
| 2. | "Simhada Mari Sainya" | | S. P. Balasubrahmanyam, S. Janaki |
| 3. | "Nane Rama Neene Lakshmana" | | S. P. Balasubrahmanyam, S. Janaki |
| 4. | "Doora Yake Ninthihe" | Hunsur Krishnamurthy | S. Janaki |
