= Sevagan =

1992 film by Arjun Sarja

- Poster
- Directed by: Arjun
- Written by: Arjun; Raja Subramanian
- Produced by: Arjun
- Starring: Arjun; Khushbu
- Cinematography: Lakshmi Narayanan
- Edited by: P. Sai Suresh
- Music by: Maragadha Mani
- Production company: Sree Raam Films International
- Release date: 5 June 1992
- Running time: 140 minutes
- Country: India
- Language: Tamil

Sevagan (/seɪvəɡən/ transl. Servant) is a 1992 Indian Tamil-language action film written, directed and produced by Arjun in his directorial debut. The film stars him and Khushbu, with Nassar, Captain Raju and Charuhasan in supporting roles. It was released on 5 June 1992 and became a box office success.

== Plot ==
DSP Sanjay is transferred to a new city and locks horns with Sabapathy, a corrupt minister. Sabapathy is involved in liquor smuggling, procuring and illegal gambling. Sabapathy gets enraged after Sanjay destroys his business, so he kills Sanjay's wife Anjali. Sanjay's mentor Satyamoorthy, a politician, is also killed by Sabapathy. An enraged Sanjay finally kills Sabapathy and surrenders to the court. The court releases Sanjay as an act of self-defense and Sanjay returns to duty.

== Cast ==
- Arjun as DSP Sanjay
- Khushbu as Anjali
- Captain Raju as Sabapathy
- Nassar as Ashok
- Rocky as Dhoni/Singh
- Vennira Aadai Moorthy as Egambaram
- Senthil as Kanagambaram
- Charuhasan as Sathyamoorthy
- Ra. Sankaran as Shanmugam
- MRK as Aarumugam
- Kavitha as Sanjay's mother
- C. R. Saraswathi as Ashok's mother

Guest appearances

- Ravichandran
- Major Sundarrajan

== Production ==
Sevagan marks the directorial debut of Arjun. As his acting career was floundering and stopped receiving offers from directors, Arjun himself decided to direct, produce and star in a film which became Sevagan.

== Soundtrack ==
The music was composed by Maragadha Mani, with lyrics written by Vairamuthu.

Song	Singer(s)	Length
"Kalloori Mandabathil"	K. S. Chithra	4:10
"Nandri Solli"	S. P. Balasubrahmanyam, Chorus	2:47
"Nandri Solli Paaduven"	Mano, K. S. Chithra	4:02
"Sevagan"	S. P. Balasubrahmanyam	3:15
"Thanga Kaavalan"	Maragadha Mani, K. S. Chithra	4:30

== Release and reception ==
Sevagan was released on 5 June 1992. RSP of The Indian Express gave the film a mixed review, citing "the narration lacks depth [...] Kushboo has been wasted. Captain Raju fails to impress only the first song bears Maragadha Mani's stamp" and praised the stunt sequences. The film was a success, and revitalised Arjun's career.
