= Vayuputra =

- VCD cover
- Directed by: Kishore Sarja
- Written by: M. S. Ramesh (dialogues)
- Story by: N. Linguswamy
- Based on: Sandakozhi (Tamil)
- Produced by: Arjun Sarja
- Starring: Chiranjeevi Sarja; Aindrita Ray; Ambareesh
- Cinematography: Sundarnath Suvarna
- Edited by: Kay Kay
- Music by: V. Harikrishna
- Production company: Sri Ram Films International
- Release date: 3 September 2009
- Running time: 142 minutes
- Country: India
- Language: Kannada

Vayuputra (transl. Son of Wind) is a 2009 Indian Kannada-language action film directed by Kishore Sarja and produced by Arjun Sarja. A remake of Tamil film Sandakozhi, the film stars Chiranjeevi Sarja in his film debut, alongside Ambareesh, Aindrita Ray, Ajay, Sadhu Kokila, Mukhyamantri Chandru, Ramesh Bhat, Padmaja Rao and Shobha Raghavendra. The original score and soundtrack for the film were composed by V. Harikrishna.

Vayuputra was released on 3 September 2009 and also marks Kishore's final film as director as he died three months before the film's release.

== Plot ==
Balu is an engineering student who visits the house of his classmate and friend Karthik in Mangalore after the final exams. Balu and Karthik's sister Divya develop affection for each other which transforms into love. Punja is a local gangster in Mangalore who is feared by the entire town. On his way back to his hometown in Mandya, Balu sees Punja chasing a man with a sickle. When Punja is about to kill the man he was chasing, Balu interferes and stops Punja, who is angered and immediately tries to attack Balu, but Balu beats up Punja in front of everyone to save himself, and leaves.

Punja is furious and wants vengeance against Balu. His men trap Karthik/Divya's father and learn about Balu's native place. Punja sets goons to kill Balu, but gets shocked when he learns that Balu's father is Chowde Gowda, a powerful chieftain of Mandya, and it will be difficult to attack them. Punja leaves for Mandya and awaits the right moment to kill Balu and his family. Balu meets Divya, Karthik and their family at a temple. Divya/Karthik's father is initially angry on seeing Balu as he was responsible for bringing trouble by hitting Punja, but Balu convinces him and both the families agree to the marriage of Balu and Divya.

One day, Punja tries to kill Balu, but instead attacks Chowde Gowda. Chowde Gowda understands that Balu is being targeted and decides to protect him. A localite in Mandya hates Chowde Gowda and his family, and decides to help Punja kill Chowde Gowda. Punja utilizes the opportunity to kill Balu and Chowde Gowda, during a temple festival, but Balu saves Chowde Gowda and fights with Punja. Chowde Gowda asks Balu to fight with him and win. Balu thrashes Punja and leaves, challenging him to return if he still has guts to finish him.

== Cast ==
- Chiranjeevi Sarja as Balu
- Aindrita Ray as Divya
- Ambareesh as Chowde Gowda, Balu's father
- Ajay as Punja
- Sadhu Kokila
- Mukhyamantri Chandru as Divya and Karthik's father
- Ramesh Bhat as a localite
- Padmaja Rao as Divya and Karthik's mother
- Shobha Raghavendra
- Mohan Juneja as Mangalore Bose Shetty
- Ramesh Pandit
- Narsing Yadav
- Arjun Sarja in a cameo appearance in "Rock A Body"

== Soundtrack ==
The music of the film was composed by V. Harikrishna and lyrics written by V. Nagendra Prasad and Kaviraj. The song "Ketta Kodukkura" from the original Tamil film was retained here as "Bhoomi Namma Jeeva". The song "Bhagavantha Bandha" was loosely inspired from Tamil song "Podhuvaaga En" from Murattu Kaalai (1980).

Vayuputra

Soundtrack album by V. Harikrishna
- Released: 2009
- Genre: Feature film soundtrack
- Label: Akash Audio

No.	Title	Lyrics	Singer(s)	Length
1.	"Bhagavantha Banda"	V. Nagendra Prasad	Karthik
2.	"Baare Baare Gopamma"	V. Nagendra Prasad	Rahul Nambiar, Jyotsna Radhakrishnan
3.	"Rock A Body"	Kaviraj	Tippu, Jyotsna Radhakrishnan
4.	"Banda Gandara Ganda"	V. Nagendra Prasad	Vandemataram Srinivas
5.	"Bhoomi Namma Jeeva"	V. Nagendra Prasad	Amul Raj, Priya Himesh
6.	"Yaare Yaare Yaramma"	V. Nagendra Prasad	Rajesh Krishnan

== Reception ==
=== Critical response ===
R G Vijayasarathy of Rediff gave 2.5/5 stars and wrote "Vaayuputhra is just a timepass movie which could have been better".
