= Chiranjeevi Sarja =

Indian actor (17 October 1980 - 7 June 2020)

- Born: 17 October 1984; Bangalore, Karnataka, India
- Died: 7 June 2020 (aged 35) (Note: Most sources state Chiranjeevi's age at his death as 35.); Bangalore, Karnataka, India
- Other name: Chiru
- Occupation: Actor
- Years active: 2009–2020
- Spouse: Meghana Raj (m. 2018)
- Children: 1
- Relatives: Sarja family

Chiranjeevi Sarja (17 October 1984 – 7 June 2020) was an Indian film actor who appeared in Kannada films. Hailing from a family of actors, Sarja acted in more than 20 films in a career spanning 11 years.

== Early life and family ==
Sarja was born as the first child of Ammaji and Vijay Kumar. He comes from a family of actors in the South Indian film industry; his maternal grandfather Shakti Prasad, maternal uncle Arjun Sarja and younger brother Dhruva Sarja are all actors, while another maternal uncle Kishore Sarja was a director. He completed his schooling from Baldwin Boys' High School before graduating from Vijaya College, Bangalore. He worked as an assistant director to his uncle Arjun for about four years.

== Career ==
Sarja appeared in 22 films, beginning with the 2009 film Vayuputra which was directed by his uncle Kishore Sarja and earned him the Innovative Film Award for Best Debut (Male). A number of his films were remakes of those from other Indian languages, including the action film Varadhanayaka (2013), the supernatural thriller Whistle (2013), the horror comedy Chandralekha (2014), the action film Rudra Tandava (2015) and the action thriller Amma I Love You (2018). His other notable films include the mystery thriller Aatagara (2015), which was based on Agatha Christie's novel And Then There Were None, and the horror film Aake (2017), both of which were directed by K. M. Chaitanya.

Three of Sarja's films were released in 2020; Shivarjuna turned out to be his last appearance before his death. He had five more films lined up which were in various stages of production at the time of his sudden passing.

== Personal life and death ==
In October 2017, he was engaged to actress Meghana Raj. They got married in a Christian ceremony on 30 April 2018, followed by a traditional Hindu wedding ceremony on 2 May 2018 at Palace Grounds. At the time of his death, they were expecting their first child. Their son was born on 22 October 2020, four months after his death.

On 6 June 2020, Sarja suffered convulsions and complained of breathlessness. The following day, he developed chest pain and collapsed around 1:10 p.m. (IST). He was taken to a private hospital in Jayanagar in "an unresponsive state"; the doctors declared him dead at 3:48 p.m. (IST), citing cardiac arrest as the cause of death. Sarja's body was laid in repose at his residence in Basavanagudi where actors, politicians and fans visited to pay their respects. His funeral was held on 8 June at Dhruva Sarja's farmhouse on Kanakapura Road.

== Filmography ==
Year	Title	Role	Notes	Ref.
2009	Vayuputra	Balu	Innovative Film Award for Best Debut (Male)	
2010	Gandedhe	Krishna		
2010	Chirru	Chiru		
2011	Dandam Dashagunam	Surya		
2011	Kempegowda	Ram	Cameo appearance	
2013	Varadhanayaka	Hari		
2013	Whistle	Ram		
2014	Chandralekha	Chandhu		
2014	Ajith	Ajith		
2015	Rudra Tandava	Shivaraj		
2015	Aatagara	Mrutyunjay		
2015	Ramleela	Ram		
2017	Aake	Arjun / Shiva		
2017	Bharjari	Soldier	Cameo appearance	
2018	Prema Baraha	Hanuman devotee	Cameo appearance in "Jai Hanumantha" song	
2018	Samhaara	Shrishaila		
2018	Seizer	Seizer		
2018	Amma I Love You	Sidharth		
2019	Yajamana	Himself	Special appearance	
2019	Sinnga	Singa		
2020	Khaki	Chiru		
2020	Aadyaa	Aditya Shankar		
2020	Shivarjuna	Shiva		
2021	Ranam	Devdas	Posthumous release	
2023	Raja Marthanda	Raja Marthanda	Posthumous release	

== Music video ==
List of Vijay Sethupathi music video credits
Year	Title	Role	Performer(s)	Notes	Ref.
2017	"Party Anthem"	Himself	Raghu Dixit	Promotional song for the film Happy New Year	
