= Arjun Sarja =

Indian actor, producer, director (born 1962)

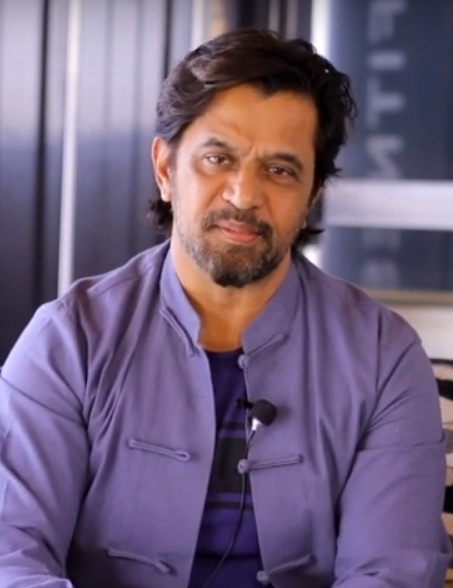
- Arjun Sarja in 2019
- Born: Srinivasa Sarja; 15 August 1962 (age 64); Madhugiri, Mysore State, India
- Occupations: Actor; director; producer; screenwriter; distributor
- Years active: 1981 – present
- Works: Full list
- Spouse: Niveditha (m. 1988)
- Children: Aishwarya Arjun; Anjana Arjun
- Parent: Shakti Prasad (father)
- Relatives: Sarja family

Srinivasa Sarja (born 15 August 1962), better known by his stage name Arjun (in Tamil and Telugu) and Arjun Sarja (in Kannada), is an Indian actor, producer, and director who works predominantly in Tamil cinema. He has mainly acted in Tamil films in addition to Kannada and Telugu films as well as a few Malayalam and Hindi films. Referred to by the media and his fans as "Action King" for his roles in action films, Arjun has acted in more than 165 films, most of them being lead roles. He is one of few South Indian actors to attract fan following from multiple states of India. He has directed 12 films and also produced and distributed a number of films.

In 1993, he starred in S. Shankar's blockbuster Gentleman which opened to positive reviews, while Arjun went on to win the Tamil Nadu State Film Award for Best Actor. During this time, he starred in hits such as Jai Hind (1994), Karnaa (1995), and the action thriller film Kurudhipunal (1995), for which Arjun won acclaim for his role while the film became India's official entry for the 68th Academy Awards in the Best Foreign Language Film category. In 1999, he starred in the political action-thriller, Mudhalvan, which earned him for his role as well as numerous other nominations. He was then featured in Vasanth's romantic drama film Rhythm, where he played a photographer, who eventually falls in love with a widow. Featuring a popular soundtrack and opening to positive reviews, Rhythm also became a commercial success.

His appearances in Kannada and Telugu films include Sri Manjunatha (2001) and Hanuman Junction (2001), respectively. He won the Karnataka State Film Award for Best Actor for his work in the film. The multilingual film Abhimanyu (2014) won the Karnataka State Film Award for Second Best Film.

== Personal life ==
Arjun was born as Srinivasa Sarja on 15 August 1962 to Kannada actor Shakti Prasad, and Lakshmi, an art teacher. Arjun had always thought and dreamt of becoming a police officer but his fate took him into an entirely different direction. Inspired by Bruce Lee's 1973 film Enter the Dragon, Arjun began training in karate at the age of 16 and holds a black belt in the martial art.

Arjun married Niveditha Arjun in 1988, a former actress who has appeared in the Kannada films Ratha Sapthami (1986) and Agni Parva (1987) under the stage name of Asha Rani. They co-starred in the 1988 Telugu film Doctor Gari Abbai. Kannada actor Rajesh is his father-in-law. He has two daughters, Aishwarya, who is also an actor, and Anjana.

Arjun had one elder brother Kishore Sarja, who directed Kannada films. His nephews Chiranjeevi Sarja and Dhruva Sarja are Kannada actors. Bharat Sarja, made his acting debut in 2014 with Veera Pulikeshi.

Arjun is an ardent devotee of Hanuman. He is building the Hanuman temple in the outskirts of Chennai. A 35-foot statue of the Lord Anjaneya was sculpted exclusively for the temple; the statue is in a seated posture and weighs around 140 tonnes. The single-stone statue is 35 feet high, 12 feet wide and 7 feet thick.

In October 2018, as part of the #MeToo movement, actress Shruthi Hariharan accused Arjun Sarja of misconduct, on the set of the 2016 film Vismaya (Nibunan in Tamil), where she portrayed Arjun Sarja's wife. In response, Arjun Sarja denied her allegations and filed a Rs 5 crore defamation suit against her. Sruthi then filed a sexual harassment case with the police, who concluded there was "no evidence" in favour of her. Crew members said no such incident happened on set. According to the director, Arjun Sarja had asked the filmmaker to reduce the romantic scenes in the movie. Sruthi alleged that the police did not seem to put much effort in investigating her claim. Her career took a nosedive, and she was unofficially blacklisted by the Kannada industry, as it supported Arjun.

Arjun was honoured with an honorary doctorate by Dr. M.G.R. Medical University in November 2024.

== Acting career ==
=== 1981-1991: Early career and breakthrough ===
Arjun's father Shakti Prasad, a renowned actor of Kannada films, did not want his son to become an actor and turned down film offers that Arjun began to receive as a teenager. In a surprise move, film producer Rajendra Singh Babu managed to convince Arjun to begin shooting for a feature film for his production house without Shakti Prasad's express permission and consequently, his father agreed to Arjun's career choice. The film Simhada Mari Sainya (1981) featured him as a junior artiste and the director of the film gave him the stage name of Arjun, replacing his original name Ashok Babu. While he began to establish himself Kannada films, he received an offer from actor-producer A. V. M. Rajan and director Rama Narayanan to do a Tamil film Nandri (1984). Simultaneously he was offered a Telugu film, Kodi Ramakrishna's Maa Pallelo Gopaludu (1985) in Telugu too which went on to be a big success, running for 367 days.

His career as an actor began to take off in the mid-1980s and he sometimes worked for up to seven shifts in a day to keep up with the films he had committed to do. In Telugu, he established himself as a bankable actor with roles in films such as Naga Devatha (1986), Cowboy No. 1 (1986), Konaseema Kurradu (1986) and Manavadostunnadu (1987). In Tamil, his successful films during the period included Shankar Guru (1987), Thaimel Aanai (1988), Vettaiyaadu Vilaiyaadu (1989), Sonthakkaran (1989), Thangaikku Oru Thalattu (1990) and Thanga Thamaraigal (1991).

=== 1992-2001: Commercial success and critical acclaim ===
In 1992, he subsequently chose to direct his feature film Sevagan. The film was a success, and revitalised Arjun's career. Soon after, Shankar cast him in the lead role in his first film, Gentleman (1993), after much persuasion. Arjun had initially rejected the film without listening to Shankar's narration but the director's persistence prompted him to feature in the film as a vigilante against corruption. The film opened to positive reviews and went on to become a trendsetter in the Tamil film industry, as well as achieving significant box office success, while Arjun went on to win the State Award for Best Actor. His change of fortune at the box office continued and Arjun began to gain ground as a bankable lead star in action films after his films including his patriotic directorial venture Jai Hind (1994) and Karnaa (1995), where he played a dual role, went on to become blockbusters. Kamal Haasan approached Arjun to play a police officer in the action thriller film Kurudhipunal (1995), and the actor accepted the opportunity and agreed to do the film even without hearing the narration. Arjun won positive acclaim for his role, while the film became India's official entry for the 68th Academy Awards Best Foreign Language Film category.

In the late 1990s, after a series of action films, including Sengottai (1996) and Thayin Manikodi (1998), he teamed up again with Shankar in the political drama film Mudhalvan (1999). Portraying an ambitious TV journalist who receives the opportunity to become the Chief Minister of Tamil Nadu for a day, Arjun offered bulk dates for filming the project to Shankar. The film subsequently won positive reviews with Arjun described as having "acquitted himself with aplomb in the challenging role".

Arjun then briefly experimented in softer roles, portraying critically acclaimed characters of businessman with "shades of grey" in Prabhu Solomon's Kannodu Kanbathellam (1999) and as an energetic civil service officer in Vaanavil (2000). He then featured in Vasanth's romantic drama film Rhythm (2000), where he played a widower and a professional photographer, who eventually falls in love with a widow. Featuring a popular soundtrack and opening to positive reviews, Rhythm also became a commercial success, with a critic noting "Arjun is as polished as ever" and adding "who would have conceived this idea that the "action king" could attempt a soft-natured role of this kind". He carried on with a lighter theme in his next directorial venture, the love story Vedham (2001), while he ventured into Telugu cinema again by appearing in Raja's Hanuman Junction (2001) and as a Hindu devotee in Sri Manjunatha (2001).

=== 2002-2010: Action roles and experimentation ===
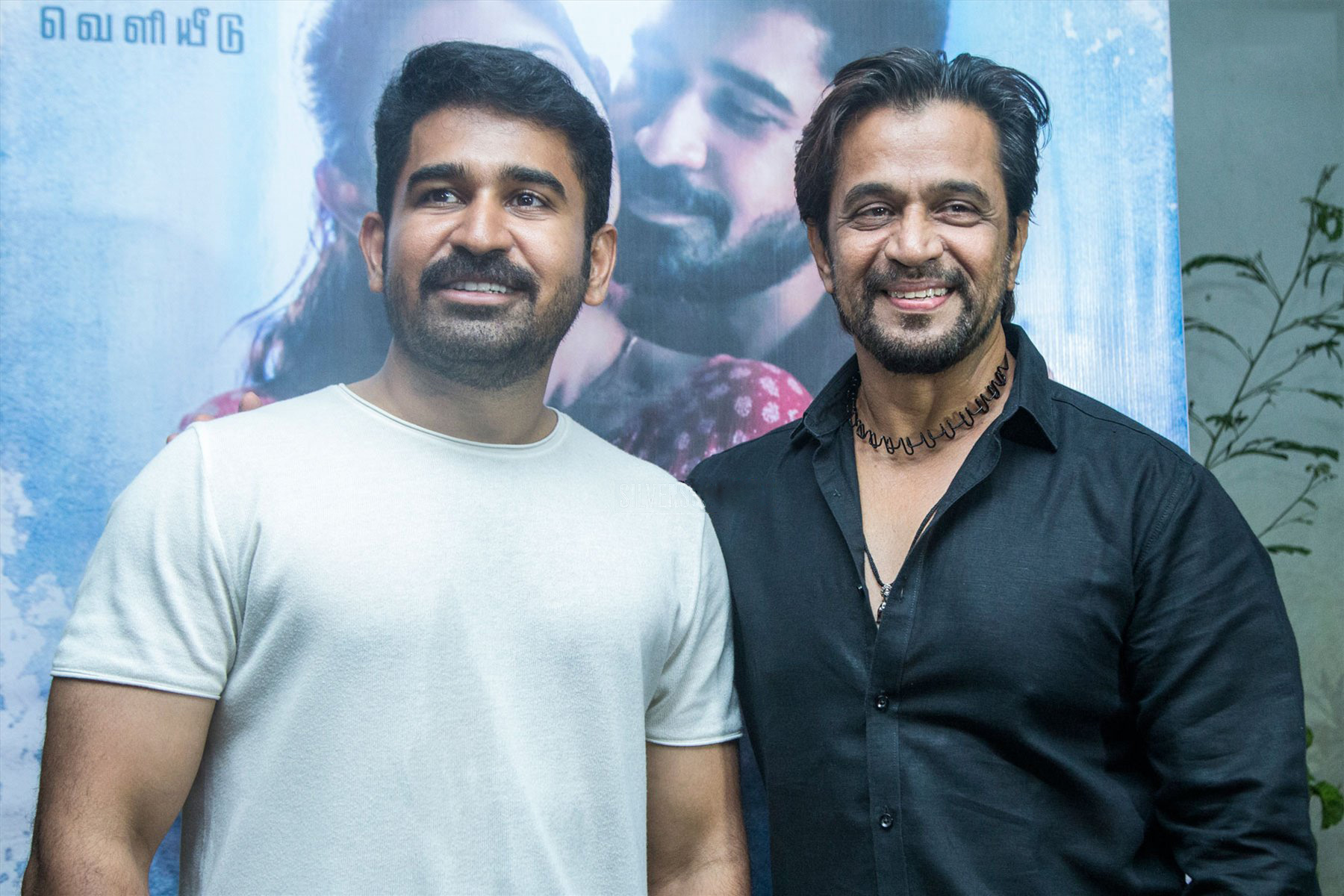
Arjun and Vijay Antony at the Kolaigaran Press Meet

The image of "action king" made him popular with town and village centre audiences, who appreciated the actor's fight and stunt scenes. He thus actively chose to specialise in action films, often collaborating with directors who specialised in them such as Sundar C, Venkatesh and Selva. In the mid-2000s, he appeared in several action films with the same premise, often portraying a police officer or a local do-gooder. He directed and featured in both the action films Ezhumalai (2002) and Parasuram (2003), while also being involved in Maharajan's Arasatchi (2004). Some of his films, Giri (2004) and Marudhamalai (2007), were box office successes, with several of his projects were not, including Madrasi (2006), Vathiyar (2006) and Durai (2008), in all of which he was the story writer.

Despite not achieving any significant hit films in the 2000s, producers often considered Arjun as a "minimum guarantee" actor and felt his sizable fan following would help recover money even through the Telugu dubbed versions of his Tamil films. In a rare experimental film for him in the decade, he portrayed the role of the Hindu deity Hanuman in Krishna Vamsi's devotional film Sri Anjaneyam (2004) and worked on the film without taking remuneration as a self-confessed worshipper of the deity.

=== 2011-present: Character roles and recent projects ===
Since the turn of the decade, Arjun has attempted to move away from his "action king" image and accepted to star in films where he would play the antagonist or a supporting role, with the move drawing praise from film critics. In 2011, Arjun accepted the opportunity to act alongside Ajith Kumar in Venkat Prabhu's action thriller Mankatha, with critics praising his performance as a police officer in the blockbuster. The following year he appeared in Kannada film Prasad, for which he won the Karnataka State Film Award for Best Actor. Portraying a middle-class father with a deaf and dumb son, Arjun noted it was a rewarding experience for him to break the monotony of his standard roles and attempt something different, admitting he was moved by the script. The film opened to unanimously positive reviews in March 2012 and then was selected to be screened at the Berlin Film Festival.

Arjun collaborated with Mani Ratnam with Kadal (2013), in which the actor portrayed a negative role of a smuggler in coastal Tamil Nadu. While the film opened to mixed reviews and became a box office failure, Arjun won rave reviews for his portrayal with Sify.com noting Arjun is "deliciously despicable in his career's most memorable negative role" and The Hindu labelling him as "brilliant". He then won acclaim for his portrayal of a real-life police officer K. Vijay Kumar in the Kannada film Attahasa (2013), the biopic of notorious forest brigand Veerappan, as well as for his role of a paralysed swimming coach in Vasanth's romance film, Moondru Per Moondru Kadal (2013).

His directorial venture, Jai Hind 2 (2014) contained a message about the declining state of the Indian education system. The film became a box office success in Kannada, while the Tamil and Telugu versions did not perform well at the box office. In 2016, he played a realistic police officer in Bharathiraja's critically acclaimed Final Cut of Director (dubbed in Tamil as Bommalattam), where a reviewer felt his "showcase of the soft, subtle yet unrelenting cop was noteworthy". In 2017, he appeared in his 150th film Nibunan, an action thriller where he played a police officer hunting a serial killer. The film won positive reviews, with a critic noting that Arjun "looks stylish and suave as the fit and honest officer, and excels in a couple of action blocks he gets". He then directed a bilingual film titled Prema Baraha (2018) starring his daughter Aishwarya Arjun in the leading role While, the Kannada version performed well, the Tamil version, Sollividava, went unnoticed at the box office. He starred in the Telugu films Lie (2017) and Naa Peru Surya (2018). Irumbu Thirai (2018) showed a different Arjun to the audience. Kolaigaran (2019) was also a performance-oriented film. Arjun Sarja's performance as Karna is another highlight of the movie Kurukshetra (2019).

He played the role of a warrior called Anandan in the epic historical action Malayalam film, Marakkar: Lion of the Arabian Sea (2021) directed by Priyadarshan. His was next roped in to play the role of one of the antagonists in the Vijay starrer Leo (2023), directed by Lokesh Kanagaraj, earning him praise from critics for this role as well. He was cast in the Ajith starrer Vidaamuyarchi (2025) as the antagonist directed by Magizh Thirumeni.

== Awards ==
- 1993 – Tamil Nadu State Film Award for Best Actor for Gentleman
- 2011 – Silver Screen Sensational Actor Award
- 2012 – Karnataka State Film Award for Best Actor for Prasad
- 2013 – Vijay Award for Best Villain – Kadal
- 2014 – Karnataka State Film Award for Second Best Film for Abhimanyu
- 2020 – Norway Tamil Film Festival Award for Best Supporting Actor – Hero
- 2024 – SIIMA Award for Best Actor in a Negative Role – Leo

=== Honours ===
- Kalaimamani Award - 1999
