= 2006–07 Karnataka State Film Awards =

Annual Indian film awards ceremony

The Karnataka State Film Awards 2006–07, presented by the Government of Karnataka, honoured the best of Kannada Cinema releases in the year 2006.

== Lifetime achievement award ==
Name of Award	Awardee(s)	Awarded As
• Dr. Rajkumar Award • Puttanna Kanagal Award • Lifetime Contribution to Kannada Cinema Award	• M.N Lakshmi Devi • Singeetam Srinivasa Rao • Dwarakish	• Supporting Actress • Director • Actor, Producer, Director

== Jury ==
A committee headed by Nagathihalli Chandrashekar was appointed to evaluate the awards.

== Film awards ==
Name of Award	Film	Producer	Director
First Best Film	Mungaaru Male	E. Krishnappa	Yogaraj Bhat
Second Best Film	Duniya	T. P. Siddaraju	Duniya Soori
Third Best Film	Cyanide	• Indumathi • Kenchappa Gowda	A. M. R. Ramesh
Best Film Of Social Concern	Kaada Beladingalu	• K. M. Veeresh • G. N. Siddalingaiah • B. S. Lingadevaru	B. S. Lingadevaru
Best Regional Film	Badi (Tulu language)		

== Other awards ==
Name of Award	Film	Awardee(s)
Best Direction	Mungaaru Male	Yogaraj Bhat
Best Actor	Duniya	Vijay
Best Actress	Cyanide	Tara
Best Supporting Actor	Duniya	Rangayana Raghu
Best Supporting Actress	Koti Chennaya	Neethu
Best Child Actor	Daatu	Revanth
Best Music Direction	Mungaaru Male	Mano Murthy
Best Male Playback Singer	• Kallarali Hoovagi ("Kallarali Hoovaagi") • Janapada ("Ele Ele Banna")	Hemanth Kumar
Best Female Playback Singer	Duniya ("Nodayya Kote Lingave")	M. D. Pallavi Arun
Best Cinematography	Mungaaru Male	S. Krishna
Best Editing	Kallarali Hoovagi	Basavaraj Urs
Best Lyrics	Mungaaru Male ("Anisuthide")	Jayanth Kaikini
Best Sound Recording	Mungaaru Male	Thukaram
Best Art Direction	Kallarali Hoovagi	Vittal
Best Story Writer	Kaada Beladingalu	H. Girish Rao
Best Screenplay	Duniya	Duniya Soori
Best Dialogue Writer	Mungaaru Male	Yogaraj Bhat
Best Male Dubbing Artist	Soundarya	Murali
Best Female Dubbing Artist	Arasu	Deepa
Jury's Special Award	Kallarali Hoovagi	• Nagini Bharana • Roshani (For Costume Design)
Jury's Special Award	Daatu	Aneka Creations (For Film)
Jury's Special Award	Snehanjali	Dhruva (For Hearing & Speech Impaired)
