= 2017 Karnataka State Film Awards =

Annual Indian film awards ceremony

- Date: TBA
- Country: India
- Presented by: H. D. Kumaraswamy (Chief Minister of Karnataka)
- Most wins: Hebbet Ramakka (3 wins)

The 2017 Karnataka State Film Awards, presented by Government of Karnataka, felicitated the best of Karnataka cinema released in the year 2017. The list of winners was announced on 25 October 2018. The jury panel headed by director N. S. Shankar submitted the list of winners to the Chief Minister H. D. Kumaraswamy.

== Lifetime achievement award ==
| Name of Award | Awardee(s) | Awarded As | Awards |
|---|---|---|---|
| • Dr. Rajkumar Award • Puttanna Kanagal Award • Dr. Vishnuvardhan Award | • Lakshmi • S. Narayan • TBA | • Actress • Director • TBA | • ₹ 2,00,000 & Gold Medal with a certificate • ₹ 2,00,000 & Gold Medal with a certificate • ₹ 2,00,000 & Gold Medal with a certificate |

== Jury ==
A committee headed by director Kavitha Lankesh was appointed to evaluate the awards. Other jury members were actress Rekha Rao, cinematographer Basavaraj, Director KN Vaidyanath and singer Chandrika Gururaj.

== Film awards ==
| Name of Award | Film | Producer | Director |
|---|---|---|---|
| First Best Film | Shuddhi | • Nandini Madhesh • Madhesh Bhaskar | Adarsh Eshwarappa |
| Second Best Film | March 22 | • Harish Sherigar • Sharmila Sherigar | Kodlu Ramakrishna |
| Third Best Film | Paddayi (Tulu film) | | Abhaya Simha |
| Best Film of Social Concern | Hebbet Ramakka | • S. A. Puttaraju • Kavitha Raj | N. R. Nanjunde Gowda |
| Best Children Film | Eleyaru Naavu Geleyaru | Nagaraj Gopal | Vikram Soori |
| Best Regional Film | Sophia (Konkani language) | Janet Noronha | Harry Fernandes |
| Best Entertaining Film | Raajakumara | Vijay Kirangadur | Santhosh Ananddram |
| Best Debut Film Of Newcomer Director | Ayana | | Gangadhar Salimath |

== Other awards ==
| Name of Award | Film | Awardee | Cash prize |
|---|---|---|---|
| Best Director | Shuddhi | Adarsh Eshwarappa | ₹ 1,00,000 |
| Best Actor | Manjari | Vishruth Naik | ₹ 20,000 |
| Best Actress | Hebbet Ramakka | Tara | ₹ 20,000 |
| Best Supporting Actor | Lakshmi Narayana Prapanchane Bere | Manjunath Hegde | ₹ 20,000 |
| Best Supporting Actress | Mooka Nayaka | Sparsha Rekha | ₹ 20,000 |
| Best Child Actor | Ramarajya | Master Karthik | ₹ 20,000 |
| Best Child Actress | Kataka | Shlaga Saligrama | ₹ 20,000 |
| Best Music Direction | Raajakumara | V. Harikrishna | ₹ 20,000 |
| Best Male Playback Singer | Huliraaya ("Valase Bandavare") | Tejaswi Haridas | ₹ 20,000 |
| Best Female Playback Singer | Dayavittu Gamanisi ("Aasadulla Daadi Bitta") | Apoorva Sridhar | ₹ 20,000 |
| Best Cinematography | Chamak | Santhosh Rai Pathaje | ₹ 20,000 |
| Best Editing | Mufti | Harish Komme | ₹ 20,000 |
| Best Lyrics | March 22 | J. M. Prahlad ("Muthu Ratnada Pyate") | ₹ 20,000 |
| Best Art Direction | Hebbuli | Ravi S. A. | ₹ 20,000 |
| Best Story Writer | Kengulabi | Hanumanth B. Haligeri | ₹ 20,000 |
| Best Screenplay | Kempirve | Venkat Bharadwaj | ₹ 20,000 |
| Best Dialogue Writer | Hebbet Ramakka | S. G. Siddaramaiah | ₹ 20,000 |
| Jury's Special Award | Mahakavya; Raaga | Sridarshan (For direction); Mithra (For acting) | ₹ 20,000 each |
