= Tara (Kannada actress) =

Indian actress and politician

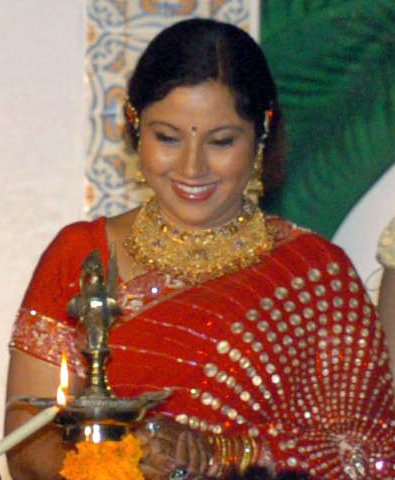
- Tara, IFFI (2005)

Member (nominated) of Karnataka Legislative Council
- In office 10 August 2012 – 2018

President of the Karnataka Chalanachitra Academy
- In office 15 March 2012 – June 2013

President of The Karnataka State Commission for Protection of Child Rights Be
- Incumbent
- Assumed office January 2020

Personal details
- Born: Anuradha; 4 March 1973 (age 53) (Note: Tara has said that she was born on 4 March 1973 whereas a news report carried by The Times of India in 2013 quoted she was 48, which implies she was born in c. 1973.) Bangalore, Mysore State, India (now Karnataka, India)
- Party: Bharatiya Janata Party
- Spouse: H. C. Venugopal (m. 2005)
- Children: 1
- Occupation: Actress, politician

Anuradha (born 4 March 1973), known by her stage name Tara, is an Indian actress, television personality and a politician. She is known for her work predominantly in Kannada language films in addition to a few Telugu and Tamil films. She has appeared in over 250 films and has won a National Film Award for Best Actress, three Karnataka State Film Awards and two Filmfare Awards South in her career spanning over 40 years.

Tara made her debut in 1984 with the Tamil film Ingeyum Oru Gangai. Her Kannada film debut came in 1985 with Thulasidala. Some of her most notable films in Kannada include Krama (1991), Munjaneya Manju (1993), Kanooru Heggadithi (1999), Munnudi (2000), Mathadana (2001), Hasina (2005), Cyanide (2006) and Ee Bandhana (2007), Ulidavaru Kandanthe (2014). Even though she started off in the lead role, most part of her film career has been in playing the second lead and supporting roles during the 1980s and the early 1990s. In the mid-1990s she began to take up author backed roles which earned her critical acclaim and several awards and laurels including the National Film Award for the film Hasina. She has been among the judge panel in television reality shows such as Raja Rani (2021) and Nannamma Super Star (2021–22).

She joined the Bharatiya Janata Party (BJP) in 2009 and is currently a nominated member of the Karnataka Legislative Council. After joining BJP, she was elected as the president of the Karnataka Chalanachitra Academy in 2012 and held the position for a year. In the same year, she was nominated as a member of the Karnataka Legislative Council, the upper house of the legislature of Karnataka.

== Film career ==
=== 1980s: Debut and breakthrough ===
Tara was first noticed by director Vemagal Jagannath Rao during her ballad performance in school, who offered her a role in his 1985 film, Thulasidala. Following this, she was signed in the Tamil film, Manivannan's Ingeyum Oru Gangai (1984) opposite Murali, where she was first credited as "Tara". It became her first theatrical release as a lead actress. Tara got her break in Dr. Rajkumar starrer Guri (1986) and thereafter acted in several movies as a leading lady and supporting actress. In the late 1980s, she appeared in supporting roles in two Mani Ratnam's Tamil films, Nayakan (1987) and Agni Natchathiram (1988). She expanded to Telugu cinema in 1985 with Bullet and later featured in Sankeertana (1987), Pelli Chesi Choodu (1988) and Sarvabhoumudu (1989).

Some of her other notable Kannada films in the 1980s include Maneye Manthralaya (1986), Sundara Swapnagalu (1986), Karunamayi (1987), Ranaranga (1988), Sangliyana (1988), Hendthighelbedi (1989), Doctor Krishna (1989) and Avathara Purusha (1989).

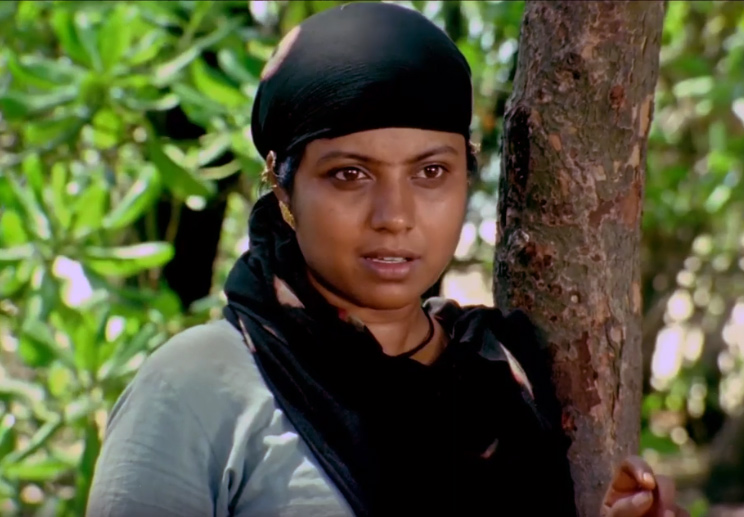
Tara in 2004 Kannada film Hasina, which won her National Film Award for Best Actress

=== 1990s:Career expansion, awards and collaborations ===
In the 1990s, Tara's first significant role came with Krama (1991) which was directed by Asrar Abid. Her performance won her first Karnataka State Award. Following this, she played the lead in Nagathihalli Chandrashekar's directorial debut, Undu Hoda Kondu Hoda (1992), opposite Ananth Nag. Her other notable roles came through Belli Kalungura (1992), Malashree Mamashree (1992) and Munjaneya Manju (1994) for which she received the Karnataka State Film Award for Best Supporting Actress.

After a string of films featuring her in secondary lead and supporting roles, Tara's major breakthrough came with Girish Karnad's parallel cinema, Kanooru Heggadithi (1999). The film, based on a 1936 novel by Kuvempu, fetched multiple awards including the State Award for Best Actress and her first Filmfare Best Actress award.

Throughout the 1990s, Tara has shared screen with established Kannada actors including Rajkumar, Shankar Nag, Vishnuvardhan, Ambareesh, Ananth Nag, Ravichandran, Shashikumar, Tiger Prabhakar, Shiva Rajkumar, Kashinath, Raghavendra Rajkumar, Sunil, Devaraj and Tamil actors such as Kamal Haasan, Prabhu, Murali and Karthik.

=== 2000 - till date: Critical acclaim and supporting roles ===
Tara received wide critical acclaim for the female centric role in P. Sheshadri's Munnudi (2000) which received multiple National Film Awards, including Best Film on Other Social Issues. Besides numerous commercial entertainers, Tara played centric roles in critically acclaimed films such as Mathadana (2002), Karmugilu (2002) and Bhagirathi (2012).

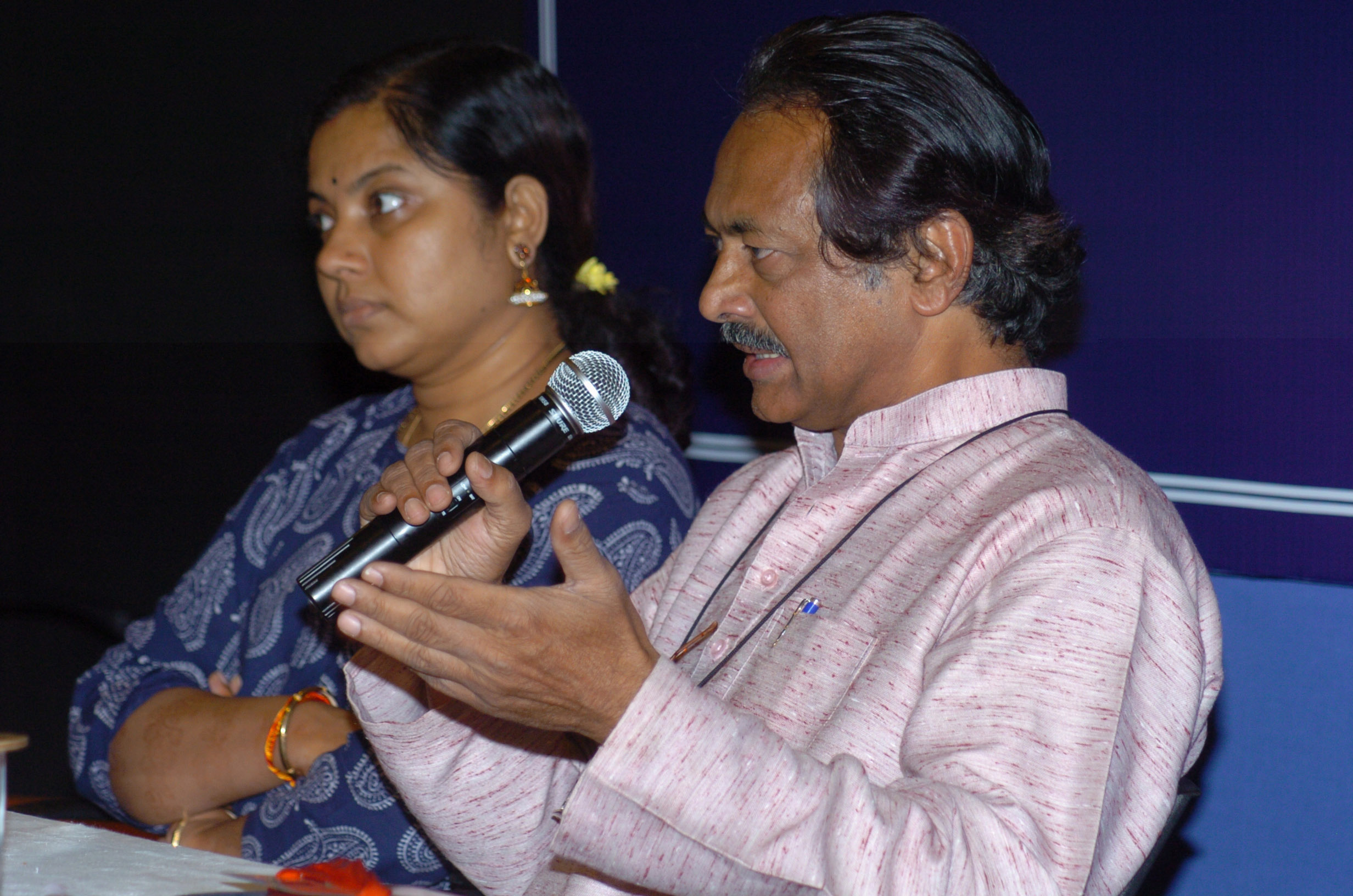
Tara (left) and Girish Kasaravalli (right) at a press conference in IFFI (2005)

In 2004, she played the titular role in Girish Kasaravalli's Hasina, for which she won the National Film Award. Beside acting, Tara produced Hasina, and announced her intention to direct films as well. Subsequently, her role as a mother in Deadly Soma (2005) was appreciated.

Tara's next notable role came with A. M. R. Ramesh's crime drama, Cyanide (2006), for which she received her third Best Actress award at the Karnataka State Film Awards. She portrayed a "traumatic" Mridula, the wife of Rangayana Raghu's Raghunath, who provide shelter to the plotters of Prime Minister Rajiv Gandhi's assassination. In 2007, she played a supporting role in Vijayalakshmi Singh's Ee Bandhana, a remake of Hindi film Baghban, and won Filmfare Best Supporting Actress award.

In the social drama Hebbet Ramakka (2018), Tara played an illiterate yet forthright villager whose world revolved around tending to her farmland, caring for her livestock, and raising her two school-going children. Her performance won her the Karnataka State Film Award for Best Actress for the fourth time.

Tara continued to play mother roles to many new age actors such as Yash (Kirataka (2011)), Sudeepa (Kempegowda (2011)), Suriya (Maattrraan (2012)), Ganesh (Shravani Subramanya (2013)), Rakshit Shetty (Ulidavaru Kandanthe (2014)), Dhruva Sarja (Bharjari (2017)), Chiranjeevi Sarja (Sinnga (2019)), Sri Murali (Bharaate (2019)) and Dhananjaya (Badava Rascal (2021) & Kotee (2024)).

== Personal life ==
Tara married cinematographer H. C. Venugopal in 2005. They have a son (b. 2013).

== Filmography ==
=== Kannada films ===
Year	Film	Role	Notes
1985	Thulasidala	Anitha	
1986	Anand	Asha	
1986	Guri		
1986	Brahmastra	Mala	
1986	Maneye Manthralaya		
1986	Samsarada Guttu		
1986	Sundara Swapnagalu		
1986	Ella Hengasarinda		
1986	Satkaara		
1986	Hennina Koogu		
1986	Madhura Bandhavya		
1986	Mathondu Charithre		
1986	Thavaru Mane		
1986	Bete		Guest appearance
1987	Ravana Rajya		
1987	Shubha Milana		
1987	Mr. Raja		
1987	Anthima Ghatta		
1987	Bala Nouke		
1987	Karunamayi		
1987	Kurukshetra		
1987	Mukhavada		
1987	Thayi		Guest appearance
1987	Bhadrakali		
1987	Lorry Driver		
1988	Ranaranga	Bhavana	
1988	Avale Nanna Hendthi	Gayathri	
1988	Kampana		
1988	Mathrudevobhava		
1988	Sangliyana		
1988	Mutthaide		
1988	Thayigobba Karna		
1988	Kote		
1988	Meenakshi Mane Meshtru		
1988	Dharmapathni		
1988	Thayi Karulu		
1989	Hendthighelbedi		
1989	Avathara Purusha		
1989	Bidisada Bandha	Aruna	
1989	En Swamy Aliyandre		
1989	Deva	Sujatha	
1989	Anthintha Gandu Nanalla	Kamala	
1989	Doctor Krishna	Chanchala	
1989	Poli Huduga		
1989	Raja Yuvaraja		
1989	Padmavyuha		
1989	C.B.I. Shankar	Actress	Guest appearance
1989	Premagni		
1989	Sura Sundaranga		
1990	Nigooda Rahasya		
1990	Agni Divya		
1990	Amrutha Bindu		
1990	Khiladi Thatha		
1990	Maheshwara		
1990	Neene Nanna Jeeva		
1990	Policena Hendthi		
1990	Chakra		
1990	Muraligana Amruthapana		
1990	Challenge		
1990	Ivalentha Hendthi		
1990	Kaliyuga Krishna		
1990	Raja Kempu Roja		
1990	Sididedda Gandu		
1990	Sri Sathyanarayana Pooja Phala		
1991	C. B. I. Shiva	Ranjini	
1991	Ide Police Belt		
1991	Krama		Karnataka State Film Award for Best Actress
1991	Nagu Nagutha Nali		
1991	Anatha Rakshaka		
1991	Kadana		
1991	Khiladi Gandu		
1991	Aranyadalli Abhimanyu		
1991	Maneli Ili Beedeeli Huli		
1991	Ibbaru Hendira Muddina Police	Rukmini "Rukku"	
1991	Karnana Sampathu		
1991	Nagini		
1991	Nanagu Hendthi Beku		
1991	Rollcall Ramakrishna		
1991	Shwethagni		
1991	Golmaal Part 2	Meera	
1991	Sundara Kanda		
1992	Undu Hoda Kondu Hoda	Rukmini	
1992	Halli Meshtru	Teacher's wife	Cameo role
1992	Belli Kalungura	Tunga	
1992	Nagaradalli Nayakaru		
1992	Vajrayudha		
1992	Malashree Mamashree	Tara	
1992	Prema Sangama		
1992	Banni Ondsala Nodi		
1992	Gili Bete		
1992	Roshagara		
1992	Police File		
1993	Munjaneya Manju	Hema	Karnataka State Film Award for Best Supporting Actress
1993	Apoorva Jodi		
1993	Karimaleya Kaggathalu		
1993	Muddina Maava		
1993	Khaidi No.407		
1993	Manikantana Mahime		
1993	Mojina Maduve		
1993	Prana Snehitha		
1993	Bhagavan Sri Saibaba	Lakshmi	
1993	Sidukabeda Singari		
1993	Bhavya Bharatha		
1993	Jwala		
1993	Love Training		
1993	Mahendra Varma		
1993	Sarkarakke Savaal		
1993	Server Somanna		Guest appearance
1993	Shrungara Raja		
1994	Alexander		
1994	Sammilana		
1994	Gandhada Gudi Part 2	Marappa's wife	
1994	Hettha Karulu		
1994	Praja Shakti		
1994	Yarigu Helbedi		
1994	Apoorva Samsara		
1994	Bhuvaneshwari		
1994	Poorna Sathya		
1995	Operation Antha		
1995	Thumbida Mane	Geetha	
1995	Mana Midiyithu		
1995	Nilukada Nakshatra		
1995	Mister Abhishek	Revathi	
1995	Bhavani		
1995	Hello Sister		Guest appearance
1995	Killer Diary		
1995	Ravitheja		
1995	Chinnada Raja		
1995	Eshwar		
1995	Professor		
1995	Shubha Lagna		
1996	Ibbara Naduve Muddina Aata		
1996	Sipayi		
1996	Dhani		Guest appearance
1996	Aadithya	Inspector	
1996	Jeevanadhi		
1996	Nannaseya Nandini		
1996	Nirnaya		
1996	Saakida Gini		
1996	Mouna Raga		
1996	Muddina Sose		
1996	Surya Puthra		
1996	Veerabhadra		
1996	Karadipura		
1997	Amrutha Varshini	Vimala	
1997	Ellaranthalla Nanna Ganda		
1997	Central Jail		
1997	Jackie Chan		
1997	Vimochane		
1997	Kandalli Gundu		
1998	Yaare Neenu Cheluve	Mary	
1998	Anthargami		
1998	Gadibidi Krishna		
1998	Hendithghelthini		
1998	High Command		
1998	O Gandasare Neeveshtu Olleyavaru		
1998	Sri Siddharooda Mahime		
1999	Kanooru Heggadithi	Subbamma	Karnataka State Film Award for Best Actress; Filmfare Award for Best Actress – Kannada; Suprabhata Award for Best Actress
1999	Premotsava	Shanti	
1999	Chandrodaya	Divya's sister-in-law	
1999	Durga Shakti		
1999	Tharikere Erimele		Guest appearance
1999	Final Judgement		
2000	Galate Aliyandru		
2000	Devara Maga	Sundari	
2000	Hagalu Vesha		
2000	Kadlimatti Station Master		
2000	Deveeri		Guest appearance
2000	Munnudi	Rukhiya	
2000	Swalpa Adjust Madkolli		
2000	Tiger Padmini		
2001	Diggajaru	Gowri	
2001	Kothigalu Saar Kothigalu	Actress	
2001	Amma		
2001	Namma Samsara Ananda Sagara		
2001	Neelambari		
2002	Mathadana	Lakshmi	
2002	Ninagagi	Rukkamma	
2002	Karmugilu	Gowri	
2002	Balarama		
2002	Daddy No.1		
2002	Galate Maduve		
2002	Sri Krishna Sandhana		
2003	Hey Nan Bheeshma Kano	Lakshmi	
2003	Paris Pranaya	Seetha	
2003	Ondagona Baa		
2003	Shravana Sambhrama		
2004	Nalla	Dr. Sarala Desai	
2004	Aagodella Olledakke		
2004	Saradara		
2004	Jyeshta		
2004	Nalla		
2004	Devasura		
2004	Naari Munidare Gandu Paraari		
2004	Roshagni		
2005	Deadly Soma	Parvathi	
2005	Karnana Sampathu		
2005	Siddhu	Sowmya	
2005	Namma Basava		
2005	Hasina	Hasina	National Film Award for Best Actress
2005	Dr. B. R. Ambedkar	Ramabai Ambedkar	
2005	Pandu Ranga Vittala	Sarala	
2005	Samarasimha Nayaka		
2005	Auto Shankar		
2006	Mata	Chandra's lover	
2006	Cyanide	Mridula	Karnataka State Film Award for Best Actress
2006	Pandavaru		
2006	Care of Footpath	Saraswati	
2006	Eesha		
2007	Shri Kshetra Kaivara Thathaiah		Suvarna Film Award for Best Supporting Actress
2007	Maathaad Maathaadu Mallige	Jummi	
2007	Ee Bandhana	Sukanya	Filmfare Award for Best Supporting Actress – Kannada
2007	Right Adre		
2007	Deepa		
2007	Vidyarthi		
2008	Aramane	Savitri	
2008	Jnanajyothi Sri Siddaganga		
2008	Ganga Kaveri	Ganga's mother	Guest appearance
2009	Birugaali		
2009	Nirudyogi		
2009	Abhimani	Lakshmi	
2009	Brahmacharigalu Saar Brahmacharigalu		
2009	Prashne		
2010	Modalasala	Paaru	
2010	School Master		
2010	Eradane Maduve		
2010	Jotheyagi Hithavagi		
2010	Kunidu Kunidu Baare		
2010	Niranthara		
2011	Mathond Madhuvena		
2011	Kirataka	Nandisha's mother	
2011	Jolly Boy	Lakshmi	
2011	Panchamrutha	Shanthi	segment: "Ondu Kanasu: a dream"
2011	Kempegowda	Kavya's mother	
2011	Sogasugara		
2012	Bhageerathi		Udaya Award for Best Supporting Actress
2012	Samsaaradalli Golmaal		
2012	Golmal Gayathri		
2013	Galaate		
2013	Shravani Subramanya	Anuradha	Nominated—Filmfare Award for Best Supporting Actress – Kannada
2014	Ulidavaru Kandanthe	Ratna	
2015	Octopus		
2016	CBI Sathya		
2016	Madamakki	Ratna	
2016	Golisoda		
2017	Bharjari	Nimmi	
2017	Gapallondu Cinema		
2018	Hebbet Ramakka	Ramakka	Karnataka State Film Award for Best Actress; Nominated—Filmibeat Award for Best Actress – Kannada
2018	Atharva		
2018	Savitribai Phule		
2019	Sinnga	Janakamma	
2019	Aadi Lakshmi Puraana	Shanthamma	
2019	Ellidde Illi Tanaka	Lakshmi	
2019	Bharaate	Jagan's mother	
2020	Shivarjuna	Shiva's mother	
2021	Tom And Jerry		
2021	Mugilpete	Raja's mother	
2021	Badava Rascal	Shankar's mother	
2022	Dandi		
2023	Tagaru Palya	Shantha	
2023	Bad Manners	Lakshmamma	
2024	Kotee	Kotee's mother	
2025	Vaamana		
2025	Marutha	Eeshwar's mother	
2026	Elra Kaaleliyatte Kaala	Brundavva	
2026	Uttara	Judge	
2026	A for Anand †		
2026	Criminal †		

=== Other language films ===
Year	Film	Role	Language	Notes
1984	Ingeyum Oru Gangai	Maruthayi	Tamil	
1984	January 1		Tamil	
1985	Bullet		Telugu	
1987	Nayakan	Shakila	Tamil	
1987	Sankeertana		Telugu	
1987	Thulasi	Ponni	Tamil	
1988	Agni Natchathiram	Mallika	Tamil	
1988	Pelli Chesi Choodu	Seeta	Telugu	
1989	Sarvabhoumudu	Usha	Telugu	
1990	Sirayil Pootha Chinna Malar	Muthappa's wife	Tamil	
1990	Kaliyuga Abhimanyudu	Padma	Telugu	
1990	Neti Siddhartha	Rekha	Telugu	
1990	Maa Inti Katha		Telugu	Nandi Award for Best Supporting Actress
1990	Sathiyavakku		Tamil	
1991	Brahmarshi Viswamitra	Sakunthala's friend	Telugu	
2008	Muniyandi Vilangial Moonramandu		Tamil	
2012	Maattrraan	Sudha	Tamil	
2017	Sathriyan	Niranjana's mother	Tamil	

== Television ==
Year	Serial	Role	Language	Notes	Ref.
1993	Mikhaelinte Santhathikal		Malayalam		
–2002	Sarojini		Kannada		
2002	Parva		Kannada		
2007	Mega Bangarada Bete	Host	Kannada	Kannada version of Mega Thangavettai which is the revamped version of Tamil gameshow Thanga Vettai	
2021	Raja Rani	Judge	Kannada		
2021–2022	Nannamma Super Star	Judge	Kannada		
2025–present	Naavu Nammavaru	Judge	Kannada		

== Awards and nominations ==
List of film awards and nominations received by Tara
Year	Film	Award	Category	Result	Ref.
1991	Krama	Karnataka State Film Awards	Best Actress	Won	
1994	Munjaneya Manju	Karnataka State Film Awards	Best Supporting Actress	Won	
1999	Kanooru Heggadithi	Filmfare Awards	Best Actress	Won	
1999	Kanooru Heggadithi	Karnataka State Film Awards	Best Actress	Won	
2000	Munnudi	Film Fans' Association Award	Best Actress	Won	
2004	Hasina	National Film Awards	Best Actress in a Leading Role	Won	
2006	Cyanide	Karnataka State Film Awards	Best Actress	Won	
2007	Ee Bandhana	Filmfare Awards South	Best Supporting Actress	Won	
2008	Sri Kshethra Kaivara Thathayya	Suvarna Film Awards	Best Supporting Actress	Won	
2010	Modalasala	Filmfare Awards South	Best Supporting Actress	Nominated	
2012	Bhagirathi	Udaya Film Awards	Best Supporting Actress	Won	
2013	Shravani Subramanya	Filmfare Awards South	Best Supporting Actress	Nominated	
2017	Hebbet Ramakka	Karnataka State Film Awards	Best Actress	Won	
2023	Tagaru Palya	Filmfare Awards South	Best Supporting Actress	Nominated	
2023	Tagaru Palya	IIFA Utsavam Awards	Performance in a Supporting role - Female	Nominated	
