= 54th National Film Awards =

2008 Indian film award

- Awarded for: Best of Indian cinema in 2006
- Awarded by: Directorate of Film Festivals
- Presented by: Pratibha Patil (President of India)
- Announced on: 10 June 2008
- Presented on: 2 September 2008
- Site: Vigyan Bhawan, New Delhi
- Official website: dff.nic.in

Highlights
- Best Feature Film: Pulijanmam
- Best Non-Feature Film: Bishar Blues
- Best Book: Helen: The Life and Times of an H-Bomb
- Best Film Critic: • G. P. Ramachandran • Rafique A. R. Baghdadi
- Dadasaheb Phalke Award: Tapan Sinha
- Most awards: • Antarnad • Lage Raho Munna Bhai • Waris Shah: Ishq Daa Waaris (4)

The 54th National Film Awards, presented by Directorate of Film Festivals, the organisation set up by Ministry of Information and Broadcasting, India to felicitate the best of Indian Cinema released in the year 2006.

Three different committees were instituted in order to judge the various entries for feature film, non-feature film and best writing on cinema sections; headed by National award winner director, Buddhadeb Dasgupta, for feature films and K. Bikram Singh along with Madhu Jain for Non-feature films and best writing on cinema sections, respectively.

Each chairperson announced the award on 10 June 2008 for their respective sections and award ceremony took place at Vigyan Bhavan, New Delhi with President of India, Pratibha Patil giving away the awards on 2 September 2008.

== Awards ==
Awards were divided into feature films, non-feature films and books written on Indian cinema.

=== Lifetime Achievement Award ===
Name of Award	Image	Awardee(s)	Awarded As	Awards
Dadasaheb Phalke Award		Tapan Sinha	Director	Swarna Kamal, ₹ 10,00,000 and a shawl

Along with Dadasaheb Phalke Award, another one special lifetime achievement award was also given to commemorate the 60th year of Indian Independence. Award was given to veteran actors, Dilip Kumar and B. Saroja Devi along with Lata Mangeshkar. Incidentally, Lata Mangeshkar and Dilip Kumar were already awarded with Dadasaheb Phalke Award for their contribution to Indian cinema at the 37th and 42nd National Film Awards respectively.

Name of Award	Awardee(s)	Awarded As	Awards
Special Lifetime Achievement Award	Dilip Kumar	Actor	₹ 10,00,000 and a shawl each
Special Lifetime Achievement Award	Lata Mangeshkar	Playback singer	₹ 10,00,000 and a shawl each
Special Lifetime Achievement Award	B. Saroja Devi	Actress	₹ 10,00,000 and a shawl each

=== Feature films ===
Films made in any Indian language shot on 16 mm, 35 mm or in a wider gauge or digital format but released on a film format or video/digital but certified by the Central Board of Film Certification as a feature film or featurette are eligible for Feature Film section.

Feature films were awarded at All India as well as regional level. For 54th National Film Awards, a Malayalam film, Pulijanmam won the National Film Award for Best Feature Film; whereas a Konkani film, Antarnad along with a Hindi film, Lage Raho Munna Bhai and a Punjab film, Waris Shah: Ishq Daa Waaris won the maximum number of awards (4). Following were the awards given in each category:

==== Juries ====
A committee headed by Buddhadeb Dasgupta was appointed to evaluate the feature films awards. Following were the jury members:

- Jury Members
  - Buddhadeb Dasgupta (Chairperson) • Rahul Dholakia • P. Sheshadri • Ratnottama Sengupta • Sekhar Das • Siva Shankari
  - Sharada Ramanathan • Hari Kumar • N. Krishna Kumar (Unni) • Himanshu Khatua • Meenakshi Shedde • Sharad Dutt • Ashok Rane

==== All India Award ====
Following were the awards given:

===== Golden Lotus Award =====
Official Name: Swarna Kamal

All the awardees are awarded with 'Golden Lotus Award (Swarna Kamal)', a certificate and cash prize.

Name of Award	Name of Film	Language	Awardee(s)	Cash prize
Best Feature Film	Pulijanmam	Malayalam	Producer: M. G. Vijay; Director: Priyanandanan	₹ 2,50,000/- Each
Best Feature Film	Citation: For a layered film that uses metaphors to address global and local issues of contemporary society.			
Best Debut Film of A Director	Eakantham	Malayalam	Producer: Anthony Joseph; Director: Madhu Kaithapram	₹ 62,500/- Each
Best Debut Film of A Director	Citation: For sensitively portraying the solitude of two ageing brothers who have lost everyone around them.			₹ 62,500/- Each
Best Debut Film of A Director	Kabul Express	Hindi	Producer: Aditya Chopra; Director: Kabir Khan	₹ 62,500/- Each
Best Debut Film of A Director	Citation: For capturing, through the journey of two Indian journalists, the collapse of Taliban in post 9/11 Afghanistan.			₹ 62,500/- Each
Best Popular Film Providing Wholesome Entertainment	Lage Raho Munna Bhai	Hindi	Producer: Vidhu Vinod Chopra; Director: Rajkumar Hirani	₹ 2,00,000/- Each
Best Popular Film Providing Wholesome Entertainment	Citation: For revalidating the philosophy of non-violence in a strife-torn world and helping rediscover the Gandhi within the common man.			
Best Children's Film	Care of Footpath	Kannada	Producer: Shylaja Shrikanth; Director: Kishan Shrikanth	₹ 1,50,000/- Each
Best Children's Film	Citation: For articulating the burning desire for education in a slumdweller. The issue is particularly relevant, as the film is directed by a nine-year-old boy.			
Best Animated Film	Kittu	Telugu	Producer: Bhargava Kodavanti; Director: B. Sathya	₹ 1,00,000/- Each
Best Animated Film	Citation: For film made with characters and concerns that reflect the Indian ethos in a format so far identified with the West.			
Best Direction	Traffic Signal	Hindi	Madhur Bhandarkar	₹ 2,50,000/-
Best Direction	Citation: For weaving in the lives, livelihoods and concerns of the street dwellers in a metro and the inspiring stand that makes the protagonist a role model across society.			

===== Silver Lotus Award =====
Official Name: Rajat Kamal

All the awardees are awarded with 'Silver Lotus Award (Rajat Kamal)', a certificate and cash prize.

Name of Award	Name of Film	Language	Awardee(s)	Cash prize
Best Feature Film on National Integration	Kallarali Hoovagi	Kannada	Producer: S. Madhu Bangarappa; Director: T. S. Nagabharana	₹ 1,50,000/- Each
Best Feature Film on National Integration	Citation: For depicting the sanctity of loyalty to one's land and amity through a love story set in the times of Hyder Ali.			
Best Film on Family Welfare	Karutha Pakshikal	Malayalam	Producer: Kaladharan K. V. and Vallabhan K. G. Director: Kamal	₹ 75,000/- Each
Best Film on Family Welfare	Citation: For redefining family values in the slums of a city through the life of a man who irons clothes for a living.			₹ 75,000/- Each
Best Film on Family Welfare	Faltu	Bengali	Producer: Arindam Chaudhuri; Director: Anjan Das	₹ 75,000/- Each
Best Film on Family Welfare	Citation: For delineating the need for family through the predicament of an illegitimate child.			₹ 75,000/- Each
Best Film on Other Social Issues	Hope	Telugu	Producer: Policherla Venkata Subbiah; Director: Satish Kasetty	₹ 1,50,000/- Each
Best Film on Other Social Issues	Citation: For focusing on the need to re-examine the present-day education system that leads many young people to commit suicide.			
Best Actor	Podokkhep	Bengali	Soumitra Chatterjee	₹ 50,000/-
Best Actor	Citation: For etching the agonies and elations of an elderly person trying to keep peace with changing times.			
Best Actress	Paruthiveeran	Tamil	Priyamani	₹ 50,000/-
Best Actress	Citation: For portraying the ferocity of love in a firebrand village girl.			
Best Supporting Actor	• Lage Raho Munna Bhai • Shevri	• Hindi • Marathi	Dilip Prabhavalkar	₹ 50,000/-
Best Supporting Actor	Citation: For the sincere portrayal of a wide range of emotions of two divergent and equally challenging characters of Gandhi in Lage Raho Munna Bhai and a benign middle-class clerk in Shevri.			
Best Supporting Actress	Omkara	Hindi	Konkona Sen Sharma	₹ 50,000/-
Best Supporting Actress	Citation: For the textured characterisation of a village woman trying to bring sanity in the violent lives of a political family in Uttar Pradesh.			
Best Child Artist	Antarnad	Konkani	Divya Chaphadkar	₹ 50,000/-
Best Child Artist	Citation: For evoking the complex emotions of a talented child overshadowed by a celebrity mother.			
Best Male Playback Singer	Waris Shah: Ishq Daa Waaris ("Couplets of Heer")	Punjabi	Gurdas Maan	₹ 50,000/-
Best Male Playback Singer	Citation: For building the entire narrative through his singing of Heer.			
Best Female Playback Singer	Antarnad	Konkani	Arati Ankalikar-Tikekar	₹ 50,000/-
Best Female Playback Singer	Citation: For the sonorous rendering that gives conviction to the central character of a classical vocalist.			
Best Cinematography	Yatra	Hindi	Cameraman: Gautam Ghose; Laboratory Processing: Rainbow Colour Lab	₹ 50,000/- Each
Best Cinematography	Citation: For creating evocative moods and capturing the nuances of a feudal system changing to modern times.			
Best Screenplay	Lage Raho Munna Bhai	Hindi	• Abhijat Joshi • Rajkumar Hirani • Vidhu Vinod Chopra	₹ 50,000/-
Best Screenplay	Citation: For the original vision with which Gandhi's philosophy of non-violence is given life in popular parlance.			
Best Audiography	Omkara	Hindi	• Shajith Koyeri • Subhash Sahoo • K. J. Singh	₹ 50,000/-
Best Audiography	Citation: For the brilliant sound design that enhances the moods and emotions through different layers of sound in the film.			
Best Editing	Paruthiveeran	Tamil	Raja Mohammad	₹ 50,000/-
Best Editing	Citation: For innovative editing that enhanced the director's vision to fashion a powerful film.			
Best Art Direction	Waris Shah: Ishq Daa Waaris	Punjabi	Rashid Rangrez	₹ 50,000/-
Best Art Direction	Citation: For the authentic recreation of a historic and culturally rich era.			
Best Costume Design	Waris Shah: Ishq Daa Waaris	Punjabi	Manjeet Maan	₹ 50,000/-
Best Costume Design	Citation: For accurate and convincing costumes, reflecting the socio-cultural fabric of a historic era.			
Best Make-up Artist	Traffic Signal	Hindi	Anil Motiram Palande	₹ 50,000/-
Best Make-up Artist	Citation: For subtle and convincing make-up for a wide range of characters.			
Best Music Direction	Antarnad	Konkani	Ashok Patki	₹ 50,000/-
Best Music Direction	Citation: For a judicious range of music from the classical to pop, elevating the film.			
Best Lyrics	Lage Raho Munna Bhai ("Bande Mein Tha Dum")	Hindi	Swanand Kirkire	₹ 50,000/-
Best Lyrics	Citation: For rousing words that lyrically combine tradition with modernity to reach the masses.			
Best Special Effects	Krrish	Hindi	EFX, Chennai	₹ 50,000/-
Best Special Effects	Citation: For impressive effects and technical finesse that enhances the magical quality of the film.			
Best Choreography	Rathri Mazha	Malayalam	• Madhu Samudra • Sajeev Samudra	₹ 50,000/-
Best Choreography	Citation: For choreography that displays modern and innovative aesthetics in rhythm and movement.			
Special Jury Award	Omkara	Hindi	Vishal Bhardwaj (Director)	₹ 1,25,000/-
Special Jury Award	Citation: For an outstanding film that synergises international treatment with an earthy, rooted sensibility.			
Special Mention	Eakantham	Malayalam	Thilakan (Actor)	Certificate Only
Special Mention	Citation: For his evocative portrayal of a man ageing with grace and dignity.			Certificate Only
Special Mention	Dosar	Bengali	Prosenjit Chatterjee (Actor)	Certificate Only
Special Mention	Citation: For his effective portrayal of a man, emotionally expressive despite his physical immobility.			Certificate Only

==== Regional Awards ====
The award is given to best film in the regional languages in India.

Name of Award	Name of Film	Awardee(s)	Cash prize
Best Feature Film in Assamese	Aideu	Producer: Nabomika Borthakur; Director: Arup Manna	₹ 1,00,000/- Each
Best Feature Film in Assamese	Citation: For highlighting a lesser known, pioneering heroine of Indian cinema.		
Best Feature Film in Bengali	Anuranan	Producer: Jeet Banerjee, Indrani Mukerjee, Aniruddha Roy Chowdhury; Director: Aniruddha Roy Chowdhury	₹ 50,000/- Each
Best Feature Film in Bengali	Citation: For sensitively exploring nuances in relationships.		₹ 50,000/- Each
Best Feature Film in Bengali	Podokkhep	Producer: Nitesh Sharma; Director: Suman Ghosh	₹ 50,000/- Each
Best Feature Film in Bengali	Citation: For a convincing depiction of an old man coping with loneliness.		₹ 50,000/- Each
Best Feature Film in Hindi	Khosla Ka Ghosla	Producer: Savita Raj Hiremath; Director: Dibakar Banerjee	₹ 1,00,000/- Each
Best Feature Film in Hindi	Citation: For an original portraying the middle class struggle against the real estate mafia.		
Best Feature Film in Kannada	Kaada Beladingalu	Producer: K. M. Veeresh, K. N. Siddalingaiah and B. S. Lingadevaru; Director: B. S. Lingadevaru	₹ 1,00,000/- Each
Best Feature Film in Kannada	Citation: For highlighting the impact of youth migration and media opportunism on the older generation.		
Best Feature Film in Konkani	Antarnad	Producer: Rajendra Talak Creations; Director: Rajendra Talak	₹ 1,00,000/- Each
Best Feature Film in Konkani	Citation: For a sensitive portrayal of an artist and her conflicting relationship with her daughter.		
Best Feature Film in Malayalam	Drishtantham	Producer: M. P. Sukumaran Nair; Director: M. P. Sukumaran Nair	₹ 1,00,000/- Each
Best Feature Film in Malayalam	Citation: For a powerful tribute to the co modification of ancient tradition.		
Best Feature Film in Marathi	Shevri	Producer: Neena Kulkarni; Director: Gajendra Ahire	₹ 1,00,000/- Each
Best Feature Film in Marathi	Citation: For an empathetic portrayal of the struggles of middle class married woman estranged from her family.		
Best Feature Film in Odia	Puja Pain Phulatie	Producer: Padmini Puty; Director: Gadadhar Puty	₹ 1,00,000/- Each
Best Feature Film in Odia	Citation: For an emotional portrayal of the bonding and generosity of children.		
Best Feature Film in Punjabi	Waris Shah: Ishq Daa Waaris	Producer: Sai Productions; Director: Manoj Punj	₹ 1,00,000/- Each
Best Feature Film in Punjabi	Citation: For an evocative portrayal of the rich, musical Sufi tradition.		
Best Feature Film in Tamil	Veyil	Producer: S. Shankar; Director: Vasanthabalan	₹ 1,00,000/- Each
Best Feature Film in Tamil	Citation: For a moving portrayal of sibling bonding in a turbulent family.		
Best Feature Film in Telugu	Kamli	Producer: B. C. Hari Charana Prasad and P. V. Sukanya; Director: K. N. T. Sastry	₹ 1.00,000/- Each
Best Feature Film in Telugu	Citation: For a convincing portrayal of the courage of a disadvantaged woman in her fight against female foeticide and child swapping.		

Best Feature Film in Each of the Language Other Than Those Specified In the Schedule VIII of the Constitution

Name of Award	Name of Film	Awardee(s)	Cash prize
Best Feature Film in English	Quest	Producer: Amol Palekar; Director: Amol Palekar	₹ 1,00,000/- Each
Best Feature Film in English	Citation: For a bold film addressing issues of sexuality.		
Best Feature Film in Tulu	Koti Channaya	Producer: R. Dhanaraj; Director: Anand P. Raj	₹ 1,00,000/- Each
Best Feature Film in Tulu	Citation: For promoting caste reform and integration.		

=== Non-Feature Films ===
Films made in any Indian language shot on 16 mm, 35 mm or in a wider gauge or digital format and released on either film format or video/digital but certified by the Central Board of Film Certification as a documentary/newsreel/fiction are eligible for non-feature film section.

==== Juries ====
A committee headed by K. Bikram Singh was appointed to evaluate the non-feature films awards. Following were the jury members:

- Jury Members
  - K. Bikram Singh (Chairperson) • Arvind Sinha • Apurba Sarma • Biyot Projna Tripathi • Satheesh Venganoor • Iftikhar Ahmed

==== Golden Lotus Award ====
Official Name: Swarna Kamal

All the awardees are awarded with 'Golden Lotus Award (Swarna Kamal)', a certificate and cash prize.

Name of Award	Name of Film	Language	Awardee(s)	Cash prize
Best Non-Feature Film	Bishar Blues	English	Producer: Amitabh Chakraborty; Director: Amitabh Chakraborty	₹ 1,00,000/- Each
Best Non-Feature Film	Citation: For courageously treating a sensitive subject in a poetic form. It demolishes the myth that the practice of Islam is monolithic and not multifaceted.			
Best Non-Feature Film Direction	Ek Aadesh - Command For Choti	Hindi	Ramesh Asher	₹ 1,00,000/-
Best Non-Feature Film Direction	Citation: For making imaginative use of the locale and cast of characters, and for displaying complete command over all disciplines of film making.			

==== Silver Lotus Award ====
Official Name: Rajat Kamal

All the awardees are awarded with 'Silver Lotus Award (Rajat Kamal)' and cash prize.

Name of Award	Name of Film	Language	Awardee(s)	Cash prize
Best First Non-Feature Film	Andhiyum	Malayalam	Producer: N. Dinesh Rajkumar; Director: Jacob Verghese	₹ 75,000/- Each
Best First Non-Feature Film	Citation: For displaying command over the medium that goes far beyond the level expected from a first film.			
Best Biographical Film	Minukku	Malayalam	Producer: Devadasan Kizhapat and Bina Narayanan; Director: M. R. Rajan	₹ 50,000/- Each
Best Biographical Film	Citation: The film succeeds in imaginatively presenting the life story of "Kottakkal Sivaraman" the legendary Kathakali artist, who specialises in performing female roles. In the process it also highlights some aspects of traditional Kathakali dance.			₹ 50,000/- Each
Best Biographical Film	Guru Laimayum Thambalngoubi Devi	Meitei	Producer: Aribam Syam Sharma; Director: Aribam Syam Sharma	₹ 50,000/- Each
Best Biographical Film	Citation: For the simplicity and grace with which the director has related the story of the great Manipuri dance and theatre artist "Guru Laimayum Thambalngoubi Devi"			₹ 50,000/- Each
Best Arts / Cultural Film	Jatra Jeevan Jeevan Jatra	English	Producer: Kailash Chandra Bhuyan; Director: Kapilas Bhuyan	₹ 50,000/- Each
Best Arts / Cultural Film	Citation: For creatively presenting the transformation of Oriya Jatra from a folk form to a highly commercialised and mainstream form.			
Best Scientific Film / Best Film on Environment / Conservation / Preservation (Jointly given)	Kalpavriksha - Legacy Of Forests	English	Producer: Mike Pandey; Director: Nina Subramani	₹ 50,000/- Each
Best Scientific Film / Best Film on Environment / Conservation / Preservation (Jointly given)	Citation: For bringing out the symbiotic relationship between forests and human life and underlining the need for conserving the rich bio diversity still existing in our remaining forests.			
Best Promotional Film	Rendezvous With Time	English	Producer: Madhya Pradesh Madhyam; Director: Rajendra Janglay	₹ 50,000/- Each
Best Promotional Film	Citation: For sensitively evoking the spirit of the cultural heritage of Madhya Pradesh.			
Best Agriculture Film	Jaivik Kheti	Hindi	Producer: Mr. Ravindra Alias Nitin Prabhakar Bhosale and Mrs. Mrunalini Ravindra Bhosale; Director: Mrunalini Ravindra Bhosale	₹ 50,000/- Each
Best Agriculture Film	Citation: For its direct and convincing approach to the need and methods of organic farming.			
Best Film on Social Issues	Children Of Nomads	Hindi	Producer: Leoarts Communication; Director: Meenakshi Vinay Rai	₹ 50,000/- Each
Best Film on Social Issues	Citation: For gently drawing attention to the deprivation experienced by the children of nomads and for creating sensitive interaction between an urban child and a group of nomadic rural children.			
Best Educational / Motivational / Instructional Film	Filariasis	English	Producer: A. S. Nagaraju; Director: M. Elango	₹ 50,000/- Each
Best Educational / Motivational / Instructional Film	Citation: For a straight forward and matter-of-fact treatment of a major health problem that has no cure but that can be controlled.			
Best Investigative Film	Mere Desh Ki Dharti	Hindi	Producer: Rajiv Mehrotra; Director: Sumit Khanna	₹ 50,000/- Each
Best Investigative Film	Citation: For exploring in depth the problem of falling agro-production and poisoning of the food chain due to use of chemical fertilizers and chemical pesticides.			
Best Animation Film	Nokpokliba	English	Producer: Children's Film Society, India; Director: Meren Imchen	₹ 50,000/- Each
Best Animation Film	Citation: For relating a beautiful folk tale from Nagaland in lyrical colours and fluid animation.			
Best Short Fiction Film	Ek Aadesh - Command For Choti	Hindi	Producer: Children's Film Society, India; Director: Ramesh Asher	₹ 50,000/- Each
Best Short Fiction Film	Citation: For sensitively bringing out the moral dilemma created by existence at a subsistence level in a hostile environment.			
Best Cinematography	Raga Of River Narmada	Music Only	Cameraman: Rajendra Janglay and Sanjay V.	₹ 50,000/- Each
Best Cinematography	Citation: For stretching the technical possibilities of videography and capturing the varying moods of river Narmada.			
Best Audiography	Bishar Blues	Bengali	Partha Barman	₹ 50,000/-
Best Audiography	Citation: For creating a sound track by combining location sound, ambience sound and music that enhance the "meaning" of the film.			
Best Editing	Bishar Blues	Bengali	Amitabh Chakraborty and Amit Debnath	₹ 25,000/- Each
Best Editing	Citation: For creating a rhythm which is unhurried and profound and that is in tune with the life and world view of Fakirs in rural Bengal.			
Best Music Direction	Raga Of River Narmada	Music Only	Ramakant and Umakant Gundecha	₹ 50,000/-
Best Music Direction	Citation: For creating a music score which becomes an invocation of the spirit of the holy river Narmada.			
Best Narration / Voice Over	Minukku	Malayalam	Nedumudi Venu	₹ 50,000/-
Best Narration / Voice Over	Citation: For the unique style of first person narration, the quality of narrator’s voice and the selective use of narration that advances the story of the film.			
Special Jury Award	Lama Dances Of Sikkim	English	• Anuradha Mookerjee (Producer) • Manash Bhowmick (Director)	₹ 25,000/- Each
Special Jury Award	Citation: For presenting the ritualistic significance and the colourful nature of the Lama mask dances in cinematic language.			
Special Mention	Special Children	English	• Kuldip Sinha (Producer) • Suresh Menon (Director)	Certificate Only
Special Mention	Citation: For highlighting the problems faced by special children or differently abled children and their families-an aspect of our society that is still not receiving adequate attention.			

=== Best Writing on Cinema ===
The awards aim at encouraging study and appreciation of cinema as an art form and dissemination of information and critical appreciation of this art-form through publication of books, articles, reviews etc.

==== Juries ====
A committee headed by Madhu Jain was appointed to evaluate the writing on Indian cinema. Following were the jury members:

- Jury Members
  - Madhu Jain (Chairperson) • Rashmi Doraiswamy • Vasiraju Prakasam

==== Golden Lotus Award ====
Official Name: Swarna Kamal

All the awardees are awarded with 'Golden Lotus Award (Swarna Kamal)' and cash prize.

Name of Award	Name of Book	Language	Awardee(s)	Cash prize
Best Book on Cinema	Helen: The Life and Times of an H-Bomb	English	Publisher: Penguin Books India Pvt. Ltd. Author: Jerry Pinto	₹ 75,000/- Each
Best Book on Cinema	Citation: For an insightful and witty account of a marginal yet iconic persona of the Hindi cinema.			
Best Film Critic		Malayalam	G. P. Ramachandran	₹ 37,500/- Each
Best Film Critic	Citation: For his analytical and perceptive writing on a wide range of themes and cinematic styles.			₹ 37,500/- Each
Best Film Critic		English	Rafique A. R. Baghdadi	₹ 37,500/- Each
Best Film Critic	Citation: For his writings on the history of cinema as well as his cogent analysis of contemporary cinema.			₹ 37,500/- Each

==== Special Mention ====
All the award winners are awarded with Certificate of Merit.

Name of Award	Language	Awardee(s)	Cash prize
Special Mention (Film Critic)	Assamese	Utpal Datta	Certificate Only
Special Mention (Film Critic)	Citation: For his sensitive interpretation of films and trends in cinema.		

=== Awards not given ===
Following were the awards not given as no film was found to be suitable for the award:

- Best Feature Film in Manipuri
- Best Anthropological / Ethnographic Film
- Best Exploration / Adventure Film
- Best Non-Feature Film on Family Welfare
- Best Historical Reconstruction/Compilation Film
