= Police Quarters =

- Poster
- Directed by: A. M. R. Ramesh
- Written by: A. M. R. Ramesh
- Produced by: S. Indumathi
- Starring: Anish Tejeshwar; Sonu
- Cinematography: R. Dwarkanath
- Edited by: Anthony
- Music by: James Vasanthan
- Production companies: S Lad Entertainment Pvt Ltd; Vasista Pictures
- Distributed by: A. M. R. Ramesh
- Release date: 1 January 2010
- Running time: 122 minutes
- Country: India
- Language: Kannada

Police Quarters is a 2010 Indian Kannada-language film directed by A. M. R. Ramesh, known for directing Cyanide. It stars Anish Tejeshwar and Sonu in the lead roles, while Dileep Raj, Saranya Ponvannan, and Avinash play supporting roles. The music was composed by James Vasanthan. The film was dubbed in Tamil as Kadhalar Kudiyiruppu (transl. Lovers' residence) in 2011.

== Cast ==
- Anish Tejeshwar as Ashwin
- Sonu as Anita
- Dileep Raj as Raju
- Saranya Ponvannan as Jayamma
- Avinash as Vishwanna
- Dharma as Venkatesh Gowda
- Lohith as Lohith
- Rohini
- Pushpa

== Soundtrack ==
The soundtrack was composed by James Vasanthan, which marked his debut in Kannada cinema.

Police Quarters

Soundtrack album by James Vasanthan
- Released: 2009
- Genre: Feature film soundtrack
- Length: 23:06
- Language: Kannada
- Label: Sony Music India

James Vasanthan chronology
Pasanga (2009)	Police Quarters (2009)	Yathumaagi (2010)

Kannada

No.	Title	Lyrics	Singer(s)	Length
1.	"Doddavaru Janaralla"	V. Nagendra Prasad	Srinivasan, Padmanabhan, Bellie Raj	4:58
2.	"Biseyada Suddioneda"	Jayanth Kaikini	Chinmayi Sripada	5:34
3.	"Aaha Oho Nakshatra"	V. Manohar	Rajesh Krishnan, Venkat Sham Sundar	4:41
4.	"Baanu Bhoomi Seridha"	KM. Gangadarappa	Rajesh Krishnan, Hari Priya	5:00
5.	"Hay Thaye Heegeke Doorade"	KM. Gangadarappa	Srinivasan	2:53
Total length:				23:06

Tamil

The Tamil soundtrack released under the name Kavalar Kudiyiruppu. All songs written by Na. Muthukumar except where noted.

- "Appan Policeda" - Sunandan, Bharani, Prasanna, Srinivasan, Padmanabhan
- "Uyire En Uyiril" - Chinmayee
- "Gangai Nadhi" - Bellie Raj, Padmanabhan
- "Kodi Kodi" - (lyrics by Yugabharathi) Sharath, Priya Himesh
- "Thaaye" - Srinivas

== Reception ==
=== Critical response ===
R G Vijayasarathy of Rediff.com scored the film at 2.5 out of 5 stars and says "Aneesh Tejeshwar shows promise. But he should improve his emoting expressions. Sonu looks cute and delivers a decent performance. Dileep comes up with a good performance as Raja. Veteran artists Avinash, Sharanya sleep walk through their roles. The camera work is good. James Vasnthan's music is above average. Police Quarters could have been a better film". A critic from The New Indian Express wrote "As far as Anees’ performance is concerned, he has done a neat job, especially in a dance sequence. Dileep Raj is at his best. Sonu looks beautiful in some sequences. Her acting has surely improved. Avinash has provided good support and Sharanya has also acted well. Dharma plays a brief role" A critic from Bangalore Mirror wrote "This does not mean that the film is boring. It is fast paced and keeps you engaged. But minus the emotional touch, it is not entertaining enough. The film is still good enough for a one-time watch. Ramesh could have made it a must-watch by adding a little more ingredients". The Times of India wrote "Ramesh has done justice to the story with a good script, though the climax is overly sentimental. The movie is not a patch on his earlier film Cyanide and one finds that touch missing in the narration". Deccan Herald wrote that "It is the understated, almost natural play by the actors that makes ‘Police Quarters’ all the more attractive". Sify.com wrote that "The relationships between the characters making the commercial film very much like a documentary. The film is still good enough for a one-time watch".
