= Mouni (film) =

- film poster
- Directed by: B. S. Lingadevaru
- Written by: U. R. Ananthamurthy
- Screenplay by: Uday Marakini; H. Girish Rao
- Produced by: N. Sivanandam
- Starring: H. G. Dattatreya; Anant Nag
- Cinematography: H. M. Ramachandra
- Edited by: Anil Naidu
- Music by: Baali
- Production company: Technomark Television Network Pvt. Ltd.
- Release date: 2003
- Running time: 127 minutes
- Country: India
- Language: Kannada

Mouni is a 2003 Indian Kannada language film directed by B. S. Lingadevaru, and is based on a novella of U. R. Ananthamurthy. It stars H. G. Dattatreya and Anant Nag in the lead roles.

== Plot ==
Kuppanna Bhatta and Appanna Bhatta are areca cultivators and custodians of the math's property. The story revolves around the tensions and circumstances that shape and influence their relationship.

== Cast ==
- H. G. Dattatreya as Kuppanna Bhatta
- Anant Nag as Appanna Bhatta
- Venkata Rao
- Nagendra Shah
- Rajeshwari Parthasarthy
- Achyuth Kumar
- Harish Raj
- Kari Subbu
- Lakshmi Chandrashekhar
- Vasudha Bharighat

== Production ==
Director B. S. Lingadevaru comes from an agricultural family that sells coconuts. He found one of U. R. Ananthamurthy's 1966 novellas about areca nut sellers relevant, so he made a film about it.

== Awards ==
- 2003 National Film Award - Special Mention – H. G. Dattatreya
- 2003 Karnataka State Film Award for Best Story – U. R. Ananthamurthy
