= Munjaneya Manju =

- Directed by: P. H. Vishwanath
- Written by: Eechanuru Jayalakshmi
- Produced by: Sandesh Nagaraj
- Starring: Ambareesh; Sudharani; Tara; K. S. Ashwath
- Cinematography: R. Manjunath
- Edited by: Suresh Urs
- Music by: Hamsalekha
- Production company: Sandesh Combines
- Release date: 1993
- Running time: 144 minutes
- Country: India
- Language: Kannada

Munjaneya Manju is a 1993 Indian Kannada-language romantic drama film, directed by P. H. Vishwanath and based on Eechanooru Jayalakshmi's novel of the same name. The film stars Ambareesh, Sudharani and Tara. The film, produced by Sandesh Nagaraj, was widely appreciated for its songs tuned by Hamsalekha and lead actors performances upon release. Tara won the Karnataka State Film Award for Best Supporting Actress for her performance in this film.

== Plot ==
It is a topical crime thriller wrapped around a domestic misunderstanding melodrama. The film addresses real estate-related crime (a controversial subject in post-liberalisation Bangalore). The villain is portrayed as a North Indian named Juneja. Madhav (Ambareesh), a lawyer with a mission, makes an enemy of Juneja when he refuses to take him on as a client. At home, his wife Meera (Sudharani), pathologically sensitive to disturbing news, gets Madhav to promise her to refuse dangerous cases. They help Meera's friend Hema (Tara) by hiring her for Madhav's office, but Meera suspects an affair between them and becomes jealous. Eventually, both the crime story and the domestic story find a joint resolution.

== Cast ==
- Ambareesh
- Sudharani
- Tara
- Ramesh Bhat
- Avinash
- K. S. Ashwath
- Tennis Krishna
- Honnavalli Krishna
- Rajendra Singh
- Ashalatha

== Soundtrack ==
The music of the film was composed and lyrics written by Hamsalekha and the entire soundtrack was received extremely well. Audio was released on Lahari Music.

Track listing
No.	Title	Lyrics	Singer(s)	Length
1.	"Kopana Madana"	Hamsalekha	K. S. Chithra
2.	"Dumbi Dumbi"	Hamsalekha	S. P. Balasubrahmanyam, K. S. Chithra
3.	"Munjaneya Manju"	Hamsalekha	S. P. Balasubrahmanyam, K. S. Chithra
4.	"Ee Jeevana Sarigama"	Hamsalekha	S. P. Balasubrahmanyam, K. S. Chithra
5.	"Kaalada Kaiyolage"	Hamsalekha	Rajkumar

== Awards ==
- 1993-94 - Karnataka State Film Award for Best Supporting Actress - Tara
