= Nannamma Super Star =

Kannada language TV soap opera

- Created by: Parameshwar Gundkal
- Developed by: Prakash Gopalkrishna
- Directed by: Prakash Gopalkrishna
- Presented by: Anupama Gowda
- Judges: Srujan Lokesh; Tara (Kannada actress); Anu Prabhakar
- Opening theme: Super Star Super Star Nannamma Super Star
- Country of origin: India
- Original language: Kannada
- No. of seasons: 3

Production
- Producer: Pixel Pictures Private Limited
- Production location: Bengaluru
- Cinematography: Arun Bramha
- Camera setup: Multi-camera
- Running time: 60-75 minutes
- Production company: Viacom 18

Original release
- Network: Colors Kannada
- Release: 27 November 2021 – present

Nannamma Super Star (ನನ್ನಮ್ಮ ಸೂಪರ್ ಸ್ಟಾರ್) is a Kannada game show involving celebrity mothers and their children, and it is airing on Colors Kannada and streamed on Voot. The show is dedicated to motherhood as the mother-child duos compete in fun tasks for the title of Nannamma Super Star. The judges of the show are Srujan Lokesh, Anu Prabhakar and Tara. The show is hosted by Anupama Gowda. The show premiered on 27 November 2021.

== Production ==
A celebrity game show like no other, featuring 12 awesome celebrity mothers who participate with their children, and the pair that excels in games, compatibility, and entertainment will take home the coveted title competing for the title of Nannamma Super Star. Each week brings unique themed tasks and challenges where the mothers and their children will not just have to win the game but also win hearts with their compatibility and entertaining ability. The surviving duo will be crowned Nannamma Super Star. The show is produced by Pixel Pictures Private Limited.

== Contestants ==
A total of 12 celebrity mothers, mostly TV actors are part of the show.

#	Mother	Child	
1	Yashaswini	Vanshika	Winner
2	Mamatha	Poorvika	
3	Supreetha Shetty	Ibbani	
4	Nandini	Advik	
5	Bhavyashree Rai	Suprabham	
6	Vijayalakshmi	Dheeraj	
7	Vindhya	Rohith	
8	Janhavi Karthik	Granth	
9	Tanuja	Mahitha	
10	Punitha	Arya	Runner up
11	Amrutha	Samanvi	
12	Bhagyashree	Ayushman	

== Weekly summary ==
Week No.	Episode No.	Original Air Date	Duo Evicted Rank	Theme	Star Of The Week	Entertainer Of The Week
1 Grand Premiere	1; 2	27 November 2021; 28 November 2021	—N/a	Introduction	—N/a	—N/a
1 Grand Premiere	Celebrity mothers and their children were introduced with performances.					
2	3; 4	4 December 2021; 5 December 2021	—N/a	Roles reverse Round	—N/a	—N/a
2	Roles are reversed of mothers and children and the contestants perform tasks.					
3	5; 6	11 December 2021; 12 December 2021	—N/a	Entertainment Round	Bhagyashree & Suprabham	—N/a
3	Couples prepare tasty, finger-licking dishes blended with romance with a pinch of twist.					
4	7; 8	18 December 2021 19 December 2021	—N/a	Halli Round	Vindya & Rohith	—N/a
4	Contestants perform tasks related to village lifestyle; Tara offers Kai Thuthu to everyone.					
5	9; 10	25 December 2021 26 December 2021	—N/a	Raja Rani Meets Nannamma Super Star	—N/a	—N/a
5	All the Raja Rani show contestants are invited for a reunion with Nannamma Super Stars; Contestants perform certain tasks and Dance by giving wholesome entertainment.					
6	11	2 January 2022	—N/a	Fancy Dress Round	Vijayalakshmi & Deeraj	—N/a
6	Dhananjay, Amrutha Iyengar & the entire Badava Rascal film team is invited as guests for this special round.; Contestants perform skits by wearing fancy dresses.					
7	12 13	8 January 2022 9 January 2022	Bhagyashree & Ayushman Amrutha Naidu & Samanvi; Rank 12 & Rank 11	Cooking Round	Yashaswini and Vanshika	Jahanavi & Granth
7	Danish Sait graces the show to promote his web series Humble Politician Nograj.; Contestants perform cooking tasks with some twists inserted in them.					
8	14 15	15 January 2022 16 January 2022	—N/a	Sankranthi Special Round	Vindya & Rohith	Puneetha & Arya
8	Tasks related to the festival were performed.; Ede Thumbi Haaduvenu contestants graced the show or the festival's special episode.					
9	16 17	22 January 2022 23 January 2022	—N/a	Blockbuster Film Round	Supreetha & Ibbani	Jahanavi & Granth
9	Contestants recreate the blockbuster films in their own way.					
10	18 19	5 February 2022 6 February 2022	—N/a	Surprise Gift Round	Bhavya Shree Rai & Suprabham	Nandini Vittal & Adhvik
10	All the children bought gifts for their mothers and surprised them.; To win the gifts mothers perform certain tasks.					
11	20 21	12 February 2022 13 February 2022	—N/a	Super Challenge Round	—N/a	—N/a
11	The contestants performed challenging tasks.; Srujan surprises Tara, Anu Prabhakar, and Anupama Gowda by gift.					
12	22 23	19 February 2022 20 February 2022	—N/a	Daddy's Round	Puneetha & Arya	Nandini & Advik
12	The daddies of all the contestants participated in the show.; Tasks related to the daddy and their understanding of their families were arranged.					
13	24	26 February 2022	—N/a	Get up Round	Arya & Punnetha	Nandini & Advik
13	The contestants wear different get-ups and they perform.; Aliens act by Poorvika and Mamta steals the show.					
14	25 26	5 March 2022 6 March 2022	—N/a	Ranga Sambrhrama Round	Puneetha and Team	Jahnavi and Team
14	The contestants perform different kinds of theater plays.; Theater artists are felicitated on the stage.					
15 (Quarter Finale)	27 28	12 March 2022 13 March 2022	Mamtha & Poorvika Vijaylakshmi & Dheeraj; Rank 10 & Rank 09	Dance Dhamaka Round	—N/a	—N/a
15 (Quarter Finale)	The contestants perform blockbuster dance performances.; Two eliminations were held.					
16 (Semi Finale)	29 30	19 March 2022 20 March 2022	Bhavyashree & Suprabham Tanuja & Mahitha; Rank 08 & Rank 07	Granny's Round	—N/a	—N/a
16 (Semi Finale)	All the Grandmothers of the contestants participate in the show.; A step closer to the finale intense the competition among the contestants					
