= Pavitra (1986 film) =

- Directed by: Vinay
- Written by: Satyanand (dialogues)
- Screenplay by: Vinay
- Story by: P. Kalaimani
- Based on: Ingeyum Oru Gangai (1984)
- Produced by: B. R. Mohan; K. K. Viswanatham
- Starring: Rajendra Prasad; Chandra Mohan; Bhanupriya
- Cinematography: Sarath
- Edited by: Nandamuri Banerjee
- Music by: Krishna-Chakra
- Production company: Vijaya Lakshmi Art Creations
- Release date: 30 April 1986
- Running time: 134 mins
- Country: India
- Language: Telugu

Pavitra is a 1986 Telugu-language drama film, produced by B. R. Mohan and K. K. Viswanatham under the Vijaya Lakshmi Art Creations banner and directed by Vinay. It stars Rajendra Prasad, Chandra Mohan, Bhanupriya and music composed by Krishna-Chakra. The film is a remake of the Tamil film Ingeyum Oru Gangai (1984) and was also remade in Kannada as Prema Gange.

== Plot ==
The film begins in a village where a decent girl, Pavitra, is striving hard for survival with her drunkard father, Narasimha, and three infant siblings. Kishtaiah, a ruffian therein, molds into a genuine with her acquaintance, and the two crush. Whereat, Narasimham mortifies Kishtaiah, seeking him bride price. Thus, he challenges steps in the city and toils day & night for a paycheck. Besides, Chandraiah is a candid & disabled son of wealthy Raghavaiah. Gopalam, his vicious brother-in-law, is Narasimha's cocktail sidekick who forwards a bridal connection for Pavitra. She accepts and splices Chandraiah since her family worsens by starving to death. Pavitra sets foot in her in-law's house when Chadraiah oaths not to touch her until her consent. Step by step, she comprehends her husband's virtue and nears him along with facing the torments of Chandraiah's stepmother, Durga & sibling, Urmila. Moreover, Gopalam looks at her with evil intent. Meanwhile, Kistaiah backs and devastates, conscious of the event, and becomes a rover. Being unbeknownst, he secures Chandraiah against danger but wounds out. So, Chandraiah houses him, which leads to a puzzling pain between the turtle doves. Discerning it, Chandraiah declares that they should be reunited. Once, Gopalam attempts to molest Pavitra in the absence of all when Chandraiah endeavors to safeguard her but is backstabbed. In the interim, everyone appears when Gopalam adversely attributes taint to Pavitra, which Chandraiah reinforces. Hence, Raghavaiah expelled Pavitra when Kishtaiah invited her. Parallelly, it unveils Gopalam's ruse, and Raghavaiah banishes him. Hereupon, Chandraiah meets Pavitra, proclaiming his guiltless aim of conjoining the two. At last, Kishtaiah & Pavitra bows down before Chandraiah's devout soul. Finally, the movie ends with Pavitra proceeding towards Chandraiah and Kishtaiah quitting the village.

== Cast ==
- Rajendra Prasad as Kishtaiah
- Chandra Mohan as Chandraiah
- Bhanupriya as Pavitra
- Satyanarayana as Raghavaiah
- Gollapudi Maruthi Rao as Narasimham
- Nutan Prasad as Gopalam
- Rallapalli as Subbaiah
- Suthi Velu as Appigadu
- Annapurna as Durga
- K. Vijaya as Urmila
- Jaya Vijaya as Pedda Bujjamma
- Kalpana Rai
- Y. Vijaya as Chinna Bujjamma

== Soundtrack ==
Pavitra

Film score by Krishna-Chakra
- Released: 1986
- Genre: Soundtrack
- Length: 18:18
- Label: Koneru
- Producer: Krishna-Chakra

Music composed by Krishna-Chakra was released through Koneru music label where all lyrics were written by Sirivennela Seetharama Sastry.

Track list
No.	Title	Singer(s)	Length
1.	"Itthadi Bindhe Bhale Unde"	S. P. Balasubrahmanyam	3:43
2.	"Idi Odinavaadi Vyatha"	S. P. Balasubrahmanyam, P. Susheela	4:23
3.	"Edi Aa Vennela"	S. P. Balasubrahmanyam, P. Susheela	4:28
4.	"Oka Sukka Chethilona"	Madhavapeddi Ramesh, Manjula, S. P. Sailaja	3:59
5.	"Manuvu Manaku Kudire"	S. P. Balasubrahmanyam, P. Susheela	4:23
Total length:			18:56
