= Ingeyum Oru Gangai =

- Poster
- Directed by: Manivannan
- Screenplay by: Manivannan
- Story by: P. Kalaimani
- Produced by: P. Kalaimani
- Starring: Murali; Tara; Chandrasekhar
- Cinematography: A.Sabapathy
- Edited by: L. Kesavan
- Music by: Ilaiyaraaja
- Production company: Everest Films
- Release date: 10 August 1984
- Country: India
- Language: Tamil

Ingeyum Oru Gangai (transl. A Ganges is here too) is a 1984 Indian Tamil-language romance film directed by Manivannan and produced by P. Kalaimani. The film stars Murali, Tara and Chandrasekhar. It was released on 10 August 1984 and emerged a success. The film was remade in Kannada as Prema Gange and in Telugu as Pavitra.

== Plot ==
Maruthayi lives in a village with her father and sister. Kathamuthu is a happy-go-lucky young man who makes living by stealing cows and demanding "maintenance" fee from the owners before returning them. When her cow goes missing, Marudayi accuses Kathamuthu and curses him. She is flabbergasted when she later finds out that it was her father who sold the cow to a butcher. She pleads with the butcher to return her cow, but he refuses until he gets paid back. Kathamuthu pays him and saves her cow. Maruthayi is embarrassed that she suspected him and falls in love with him. Kathamuthu promises to leave his thieving days behind and find a job.

Things go well until Maruthayi's father decides to find a groom for her. Kathamuthu asks for her hand but her father refuses to let his daughter marry a thief and beats him up. Kathamuthu decides to go to Madras to find a job. Maruthayi asks him to take her with him but he refuses, saying that he will return with means and get her father's approval to rightfully marry her. While he is gone, her father forces her to marry a rich but physically disabled man. Though her husband showers affection on her, Maruthayi is unable to forget Kathamuthu. Meanwhile, Kathamuthu finds a good job and returns to claim her hand. He is enraged when he finds out that she is already married and vows to get her back come what may. Can he get his lost love back forms rest of the story.

== Cast ==
- Murali as Murali
- Tara as Maruthayi
- Chandrasekhar as Maruthayi's husband
- T. K. S. Chandran
- Janagaraj
- Vinu Chakravarthy as Maruthayi's father
- Senthil
- Gandhimathi
- Y. Vijaya
- S. Varalakshmi
- Gemini Rajeshwari

== Production ==
P. Kalaimani requested Manivannan to make a film for his production company to which he agreed. Gobichettipalayam was chosen as the filming location. Since composer Ilaiyaraaja was busy, Kalaimani collected the rights of Ilaiyaraaja's five unused songs from producers of other films and the storyline of Ingeyum Oru Gangai was developed based on them. The film was launched at Prasad Studios along with song recording. Mohan, Nalini, Pandiyan were originally reported to be the cast members. It is the Tamil debut of Anuradha, who was given the stage name Tara. Chandrasekhar, who portrayed her character's husband, had to remove his signature beard for the role.

== Soundtrack ==
The soundtrack was composed by Ilaiyaraaja. The song "Solai Pushpangale" is set in the Carnatic raga Shivaranjani. According to Charulatha Mani, the line "sogum sollungale" from the song "touches upon the Sadharana Gandhara giving a hint of sadness that is so quintessential in this piece".

Track listing
No.	Title	Lyrics	Singer(s)	Length
1.	"Solai Pushpangale"	Vairamuthu	Gangai Amaran, P. Susheela	4:17
2.	"Oru Villa Valachu"	Na. Kamarasan	Malaysia Vasudevan, Deepan Chakravarthy, Gangai Amaran	5:08
3.	"Annatha Nenachen"	Vaali	Gangai Amaran	1:57
4.	"Santhana Kiliye"	Gangai Amaran	S. P. Sailaja	2:06
5.	"Aattam Thaan"	Muthulingam	S. P. Sailaja	3:37
6.	"Therku Theru Machaney"	Na Kamarasan	Gangai Amaran, P. Susheela	4:29
7.	"Parama Sivan Thalaiyil Ulla"	Gangai Amaran	Ilaiyaraaja	2:42
Total length:				24:16

== Release ==
Ingeyum Oru Gangai was released on 10 August 1984, and emerged a success.
