= Attahasa =

- Promotional poster
- Directed by: A. M. R. Ramesh
- Written by: A. M. R. Ramesh
- Produced by: A. M. R. Ramesh; V. Srinivas; Jagadeesh
- Starring: Arjun Sarja; Kishore; Suresh Oberoi
- Cinematography: Vijay Milton
- Edited by: Anthony
- Music by: Sandeep Chowta
- Production companies: Akshaya Creations; Sai Sri Cinemas; S Lad Entertainment
- Release date: 14 February 2013
- Country: India
- Language: Kannada
- Box office: ₹5 crore

Attahasa (transl. Defiance) is a 2013 Indian Kannada-language biographical film directed by A. M. R. Ramesh, based on the notorious forest brigand Veerappan. Kishore plays the role of Veerappan in the film, whilst featuring Arjun Sarja and Suresh Oberoi. After much delay in the theatrical release the film was opened to screens on 14 February 2013 all across the southern states of India to positive reviews. The film was partially reshot in Tamil as Vana Yuddham (transl. Forest war). The film was dubbed into Telugu as Veerappan.

== Cast ==
- Arjun Sarja as D.G.P K. Vijay Kumar IPS, who killed Veerappan
- Kishore as Veerappan
- Suresh Oberoi as Rajkumar, who gets kidnapped by Veerappan
- Lakshmi Rai as Vijetha Vasisht (guest appearance)
- Ravi Kale as Senthamarai Kannan IPS
- V. I. S. Jayapalan as Periyavar
- Sampath Ram as Sethukuli Govindan
- A. M. R. Ramesh as Gurunatha
- Vijayalakshmi as Muthulakshmi Veerappan, Veerappan's wife
- Bhavana Rao as Chandhini
- Sulakshana as Parvathamma Rajkumar
- Suchendra Prasad as DCF Srinivas
- Jayachitra as Jayalalithaa, Chief Minister of Tamil Nadu
- Rishab Shetty as Bomb maker (Undercover Cop)
- Nagappa Maradagi (abducted along with Rajkumar) as himself
- Suresh Mangalore as Minister Nagappa
- Yogi Devaraj as Veerappan's father
- Suma Guha as Vijayakumar's wife
- Besant Ravi (Tamil version)

== Production ==
In March 2011, A. M. R. Ramesh confirmed that his next directorial would be based on Veerappan and that he had completed the scriptment, while adding that Kishore had already agreed to play the lead role of Veerappan. Ramesh had been researching on Veerappan for 10 years and had spoken with several key people who were associated with him or involved in various incidents. Ramesh clarified that he would just present the real happenings, without taking any sides. Arjun won the role of the chief Special Task Force officer Vijayakumar. Initial reports claimed that Bollywood actress Rani Mukherji was considered for the role of Veerappan's wife, Muthulakshmi. Sources in July 2011 reported that Priyamani and Jayachitra were signed on to portray Muthulakshmi and the role of Chief Minister Jayalalithaa, respectively. Priyamani denied being part of the project, adding that she was not offered the role. Subsequently, Vijayalakshmi was finalized for the role. Although Ramesh wanted Akkineni Nageswara Rao to play Kannada actor Rajkumar, who was kidnapped by Veerappan, Suresh Oberoi was eventually roped in, while Sulakshana would play his wife Parvathamma. Ramya was initially supposed to enact the role of a journalist, however the actress too dismissed the reports, following which Nikita Thukral was approached for the role. Lakshmi Rai then confirmed that she was offered the role. Bhavana Rao, known under her stage name Shikha in Tamil cinema, revealed that she was playing a character called Chandhini, who was considered as "Veerappan's right-hand". Nagappa Maradagi, who also was abducted by Veerappan, and Shivakumar Mugilan, who was part of Veerappan's gang, were involved in the making of the film.

Vijay Milton and Anthony were confirmed as the cinematographer and editor, respectively, while Sandeep Chowta was signed on to compose the film's score, although initial reports suggested that Yuvan Shankar Raja would be the music director.

== Reception ==
Srikanth Srinivasa of Rediff gave the film a rating of three out of five stars and praised the performance of Kishore as Veerappan in the film. Also, the role of the cinematographer was praised. Srinivasa concluded saying, "A M R Ramesh has made another visually captivating film, notwithstanding the flaws. The movie makes for quite an engaging watch with timelines and specific instances. Veerappan’s final encounter is interesting, making it an edge-of-the-seat thriller" IBN too praised the performance of all the departments in the film and call the film, a technically brilliant biopic of Veerappan". The Times of India scored the film at 3.5 out of 5 stars and wrote "Kishore has done a neat job as Veerappan with good dialogue delivery and expressions. Arjun Sarja and Ravi Kale have done justice to their roles. Suresh Oberoi is quite good as Rajkumar. Music by Sandeep Chowta is excellent. Cinematography by Vijay Milton is catchy". The New Indian Express wrote "Telling the life of a forest brigand is violent but compelling. Biographical facts are not an easy job but Attahasa has brought an interesting element into Kannada films".

== Controversy ==
Mysore based writer T. Gururaj, who wrote a book on Veerappan titled Rudhra Narthana, filed a complaint against Ramesh for using his content in the film without his permission.

Veerapan's wife Muthulakshmi filed a case against the film's production company calling for its ban, as she felt her husband was portrayed in a bad light. The Supreme court of India asked the producers to pay Rs. 2.5 million to the widow. The film was then released during the course of the day.
