= Kaada Beladingalu =

- Directed by: B. S. Lingadevaru
- Written by: Jogi (Girish Rao)
- Screenplay by: B. S. Lingadevaru
- Produced by: • K. M. Veeresh • Siddalingayya • B. S. Lingadevaru
- Starring: C. H. Lokanath, H. G. Dattatreya, Ananya Kasaravalli
- Cinematography: H.M. Ramachandra
- Edited by: Anil Naidu
- Music by: Rajesh Ramanath
- Release date: 2007
- Country: India
- Language: Kannada

Kaada Beladingalu (Kannada: ಕಾಡ ಬೆಳದಿಂಗಳು) is a Kannada language film released in 2007 and directed by B. S. Lingadevaru. The movie is about the impact of urbanization on the old people living in the rural areas. The film was shot in the interior villages of Chikmagalur district.

== Cast ==
- Lokanath as Sadashivaiah
- H. G. Dattatreya as Chandranna
- Ananya Kasaravalli as Sudeshne
- M. P. Venkat Rao as Shankranna

== Awards ==
Karnataka State Film Awards 2006-07

- Karnataka State Film Award for Best Social film
- Karnataka State Film Award for Best Story

54th National Film Awards

- National Film Award for Best Feature Film in Kannada
