= Yathumaagi =

- Poster
- Directed by: S. Balakumar
- Produced by: Sakthi Sangavi; Mohana Sangavi
- Starring: Sachin; Sunaina
- Cinematography: Mohammed Nazir
- Edited by: VJ Sabu; Riyas
- Music by: James Vasanthan
- Production company: Chola Creations
- Release date: 12 March 2010
- Country: India
- Language: Tamil

Yathumaagi is a 2010 Indian Tamil-language romance film written and directed by S. Balakumar that stars newcomer Sachin and Sunaina in lead roles. The film's score and soundtrack were composed by James Vasanthan. The film, produced by Sakthi Sangavi and Mohana Sangavi under the Chola Creations banner, was released on 12 March 2010.

== Plot ==
Anand (Sachin) is an advertisement photographer. Quite typical to such genre of films, he comes across Annalakshmi (Sunaina), who is conservative in her looks. After a few initial encounters, Annalakshmi develops love for Anand. However, Anand has other plans. The mystery is soon unraveled and is made known that Anand hails from a family of doctors. When everyone thinks that Anand will tie the knot to Annalakshmi, the twist occurs in the form of Anand accepting an arranged marriage. What transpires between the lead couple forms the rest of the story, which ends in an interesting climax.

== Cast ==
- Sachin as Anand
- Sunaina as Annalakshmi
- Riyaz Khan
- Aniruthan
- Azhagan Thamizhmani as Annalakshmi's father
- Ramesh Khanna
- Pandu
- S. S. Kumaran
- Sengai Chellappa
- T. K. Madhan

== Production ==
Sunaina played a village belle in the film.

== Soundtrack ==
The film's soundtrack is composed by James Vasanthan, which features six tracks.

Yathumaagi

Soundtrack album by James Vasanthan
- Released: 2010
- Genre: Film soundtrack
- Language: Tamil

James Vasanthan chronology
Police Quarters (2009)	Yathumaagi (2010)	Easan (2010)

Song	Singer(s)
"Parthadum"	Vijay Yesudas, K. S. Chitra
"Yathumaagi"	Benny Dayal
"Pesum Minsaram"	Benny Dayal
"Thigatta Thigatta"	Deepa Miriam
"Yaaradhu Yaro Yaro"	Belli Raj, Srimathumitha
"Koothadichivada"	Prasad, Ramkumar, Vijay Krishnan, Uma

== Reception ==
A critic from The Times of India gave the film two out of five stars and wrote that "The film's thin storyline is not at fault, only it loses out to poor, unimaginative narration".
