= James Vasanthan =

Indian television host

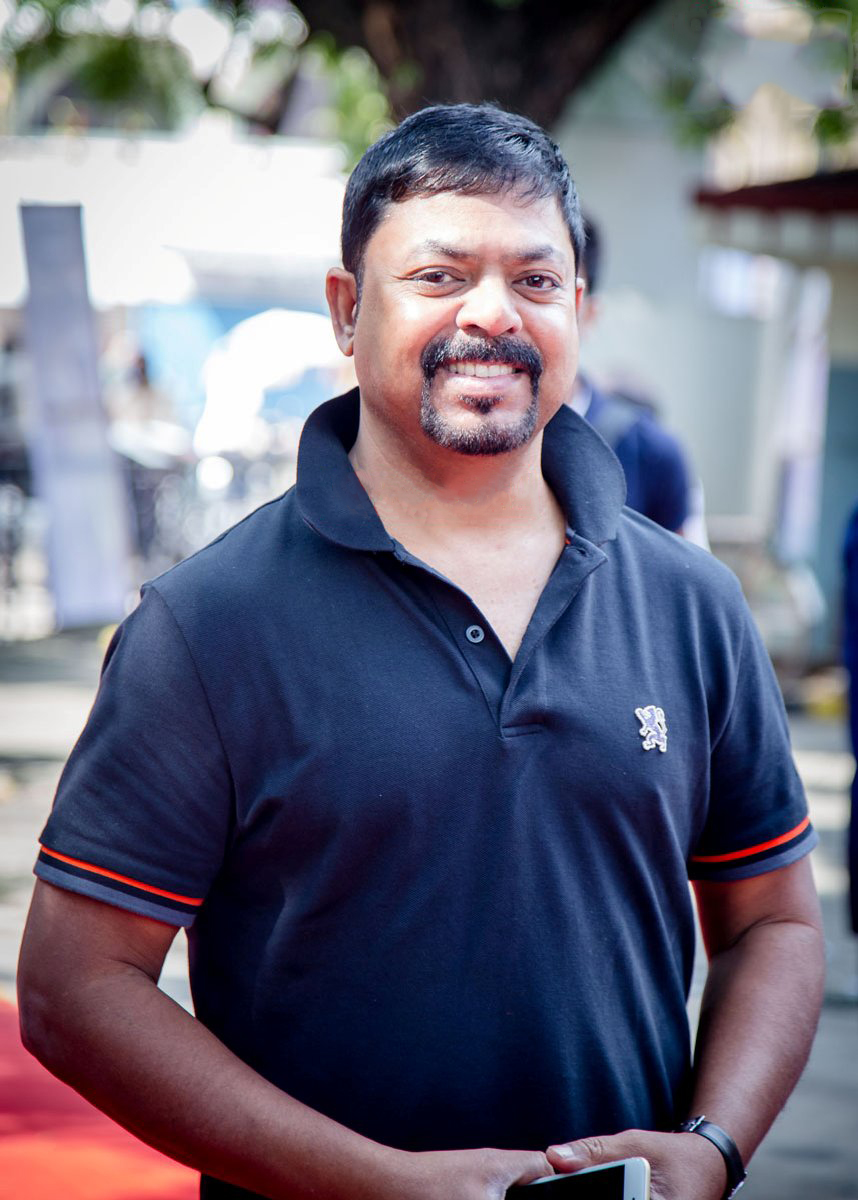

Background information
- Born: Tiruchirappalli, Tamil Nadu, India
- Genres: Film music; Choral; Gospel
- Occupations: Composer, filmmaker, tv host, singer, lyricist, screen writer, motivational speaker
- Instruments: Piano, guitar
- Years active: 1995–present (TV Host); 2008–present (Film Composer); 2015–present (Filmmaker)
- Labels: Bigdeal Music (own); Miracle Entertainment (own)
- Website: www.jamesvasanthan.in

James Vasanthan is an Indian Television (Tamil) host, a film music composer, and a filmmaker and a motivational speaker. For more than two decades, he has worked as an anchor in popular Tamil satellite television channels like Sun TV and Vijay TV before debuting as a film music composer in the Tamil Film Industry in the year 2008, and a filmmaker in 2015.

== Biography ==
James Vasanthan was born in Tiruchirapalli (Trichy), Tamil Nadu, India, to Brownie Sophia and George Theophilus, a police officer, who died in service, due to cancer. James was just 12 then. His mom used to tell him that her father Antony who was an engineer in the ropeway services in Anamalai Hills, Pollachi, erected and maintained by the Brits in the colonial times, was a meticulous person known for his discipline and strictness. James could see all of those traits in her. She was known to be a disciplinarian and perfectionist, excelling in every aspect of home-making. James owes every skill and craft that he possesses today, to her. Losing her when he was 21 was a turning point of his life.

He studied first at YWCA Primary School (Presently BHEL Matriculation Higher Secondary School) and later at Bishop Heber Higher Secondary School (Teppakulam) and then graduated in English literature from Bishop Heber College, Trichy, though his desire was to pursue a science degree. Being a single mother, she couldn't afford the high fee structure of a science course, which made him a literature student. Then he did his master's degree in English in Jamal Mohamed College. Later, he educated himself in Carnatic music from Madras University. It was his mentor Dr Uma Maheswari (former principal of Government College of Music, Thiruvaiyaru) who advised him to do this course and paid all his fees and provided every course material and resource, being a scholar in the subject. He looks up to her gratefully for all that she did to him. He also holds diplomas in Pianoforte, Guitar and Theory of Music in Western music from Trinity College, London.

After his studies he went to Kodaikanal and was working as the restaurant musician in Carlton Hotel, until he moved on to teach music in the residential school, St. Peter's School, Kodaikanal, formerly known as St. Peter's Public School. After a six-year stint as music teacher, he migrated to Madras to fulfill his long-term desire and dream of making as a film composer.

Though music was his "first love", he forayed into television as an anchor in SUN TV.

He has composed music for Christian audio albums numbering around 400. He still continues to arrange music for many gospel productions. In 2008, he eventually entered the Chennai film industry as a music director by composing the songs and score for the Tamil film Subramaniyapuram, directed by M. Sasikumar, who was a student at St. Peter's Public School in Kodaikanal, where James Vasanthan went to teach music after his post-graduation. This film 'Subramaniyapuram' which went on to become a blockbuster brought him into prominence with the film's songs and background score gaining fame and being praised. and the song "Kangal Irandal" topping the charts and being cited as the "anthem of the year among the youth".

== Discography ==
As composer

Year	Title	Language	Notes
2008	Subramaniyapuram	Tamil	Released in Telugu as Ananthapuram 1980 Winner, Vijay Award for Best Find of the Year; Nominated, Filmfare Best Music Director Award (Tamil)
2009	Naanayam	Tamil	Released in Telugu as Padmavyuham
2009	Pasanga	Tamil	
2009	Police Quarters	Kannada	Released in Tamil as Kadhalar Kudiyiruppu
2010	Yaathumagi	Tamil	
2010	Eesan	Tamil	Winner, Vijay music awards for Best Folk Song of the year.
2011	Doubles	Malayalam	
2011	Marudhavelu	Tamil	
2012	Paagan	Tamil	
2012	Puthagam	Tamil	
2012	Dalam (Telugu)	Telugu	
2012	Koottam	Tamil	
2013	Nagaraja Cholan MA, MLA	Tamil	
2013	Vizha	Tamil	
2013	Azhagumagan	Tamil	
2014	Vasanthathinte Kanal Vazhikalil	Malayalam	Composed one song "Adima Nukam" Sung by K. J. Yesudas
2015	Sandamarutham	Tamil	
2015	Vaanavil Vaazhkai	Tamil	Writer, composer, director
2018	Pareeth Pandari	Malayalam	
2023	Ariyavan	Tamil	Composed one song "Yaaraiyum Velgira"
TBA	Oh! Andha Naatkal	Tamil	Writer, composer, director
TBA	Para Para Para	Tamil	
2026	Chola Kollai Bommai	Tamil	Writer, composer, director

As lyricist

Year	Songs	Film	Notes
2009	"Who's That Guy"	Pasanga	
2010	"Aasa Aasa"	Naanayam	
2015	"Bye To School"	Vaanavil Vaazhkkai	
2015	"Music Makes Me Happy"	Vaanavil Vaazhkkai	
2015	"We Are Happy This Way"	Vaanavil Vaazhkkai	
2015	"Vazha pirandhaval"	Vaanavil Vaazhkkai	
2015	"This Is Real Love"	Vaanavil Vaazhkkai	
2015	"Boys Don't Cry"	Vaanavil Vaazhkkai	
2015	"God Bless Saturday"	Vaanavil Vaazhkkai	
2015	"Four In One"	Vaanavil Vaazhkkai	
2015	"Vaazhndhidave Vidu"	Vaanavil Vaazhkkai	
2015	"Please Forgive Me"	Vaanavil Vaazhkkai	
2015	"Vaanavil Vaazhkkai"	Vaanavil Vaazhkkai	

As singer

Year	Song	Film	Notes
2013	"Viraivil Vidiyum"	Nagarajan Cholan M. A. MLA	

== Filmography ==
=== Onscreen appearances ===
Year	Film	Role	Notes
1998	Unnidathil Ennai Koduthen	television interviewer	

=== Television anchor ===
Year	Show	Channel	Notes
1999	Super Kudumbam	Sun TV	
2006-2007	Tamil Pesu Thanga Kaasu	Makkal Tholaikaatchi	
2007	Tamil Pechu Engal Moochu	Star Vijay	
2010-2016	Oru Vaarthai Oru Latcham Tamizhodu Vilayaadu	Star Vijay	
2012-2013	Hariyudan Naan	Jaya TV	
2023-2026	Tamizhodu Vilayaadu	Kalaignar	
