= Kallarali Hoovagi =

- Film poster
- Directed by: T. S. Nagabharana
- Written by: B. L. Venu
- Based on: Kallarali Hoovagi by B. L. Venu
- Produced by: Anand Singh; Madhu Bangarappa
- Starring: Vijay Raghavendra; Umashankari; Anant Nag; Ambareesh; Bharathi
- Cinematography: H. C. Venu
- Edited by: Basavaraj Urs
- Music by: Hamsalekha
- Production company: Akash Audio
- Release date: 22 December 2006
- Running time: 148 minutes
- Country: India
- Language: Kannada

Kallarali Hoovagi (Kannada: ಕಲ್ಲರಳಿ ಹೂವಾಗಿ) is a 2006 Indian Kannada historical drama romance film directed by T. S. Nagabharana, based on a novel of the same name written by B. L. Venu. Set in 1772, during the reign of Madakari Nayaka, the last ruler of Chitradurga, it features a fictitious love story between a Hindu Veerashaiva boy and a Muslim girl. The film stars Vijay Raghavendra, Umashankari, Anant Nag, Bharathi, Ambareesh, Avinash.

At the 54th National Film Awards, the film won Nargis Dutt Award for Best Feature Film on National Integration. It also won multiple awards at the 2006–07 Karnataka State Film Awards. Upon theatrical release on 22 December 2006, the film received widespread critical acclaim and also emerged as a box-office success.

The core plot of the 2015 Hindi film Bajrangi Bhaijaan was thematically same as this movie.

== Plot ==
A young Hindu boy (belonging to a caste primarily considered vegetarian) staying in a Hindu dominated kingdom finds a mute Muslim girl belonging to Muslim dominated neighbouring enemy kingdom. He gives her shelter in his Hindu family without knowing her background. When he realizes that she is a non-vegetarian, he secretly provides her with biryani in spite of him being vegetarian. He realizes that she is Muslim while she is offering prayers but hides it from his parents. When it comes to the fore that she belongs to the enemy kingdom, he faces opposition from a senior family member. He decides to personally send her back to her hometown safely. Though he escapes the security at the borders, he gets caught in the enemy kingdom as she reaches home and is sentenced to death by hanging. However, he is pardoned after the girl regains her lost voice in the climax.

== Cast ==
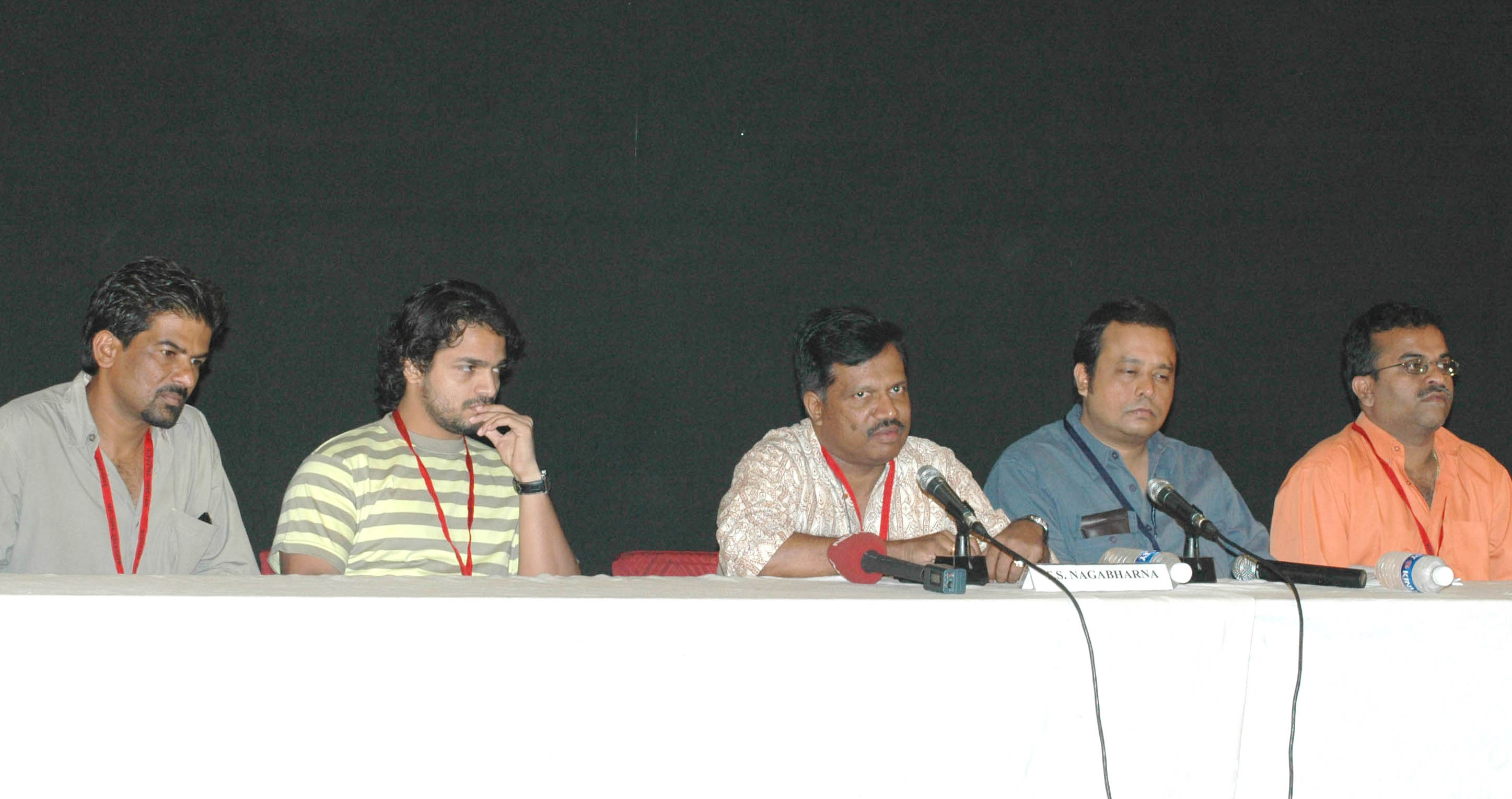
Director T. S. Nagabharana (center) with the film's crew, addressing the media in the sidelines of 37th International Film Festival of India, 2006.

- Vijay Raghavendra as Jayadeva
- Uma Shankari as Noor Jahan/Ratna
- Anant Nag as Basayya (Jayadeva's father and royal court physician)
- Bharathi Vishnuvardhan as Neelamma (Jayadeva's mother)
- Ambareesh as Madakari Nayaka
- Sumalatha as Padmamma Nagathi (Madakari Nayaka's wife)
- Devaraj as Hyder Ali
- Avinash as Parashuramappa
- M. P. Shankar as Dodda Madakari Nayaka
- Mukhyamantri Chandru as Murigeppa (Jayadeva's uncle)
- Sathyajith as Kallinarasappa
- Sharath Lohithaswa as Palanayaka
- Kishore as Mohiddin
- Vijay as Bedara Paapu
- Nivedhitha as Gangi
- Mahalakshmi as Gauri, Jayadeva's sister
- Amulya as Uma, Jayadeva's sister
- Shanthamma as Thippajji
- Pavan Kumar as Ranga, Jayadeva's friend
- Yogish as Shivu
- Akul Balaji as Thippaga, Jayadeva's friend
- Santosh as Bhasha
- Narendra Babu Sharma as Talavar Rangayya
- Bharath Bagavathar as Kuthbuddin Khan

== Production ==
The sets of Chitradurga fort was recreated at Kanteerava Studios.

== Soundtrack ==
Kallarali Hoovagi

Soundtrack album by Hamsalekha
- Released: 20 October 2006
- Genre: Feature film soundtrack
- Length: 50:13
- Label: Anand Audio
- Producer: Hamsalekha

Hamsalekha chronology
Sixer (2006)	Kallarali Hoovagi (2006)	Pandavaru (2006)

Hamsalekha composed the film's background score and music for its soundtrack, also writing its lyrics. The soundtrack album consists of 12 tracks.

No.	Title	Lyrics	Singer(s)	Length
1.	"Kallarali Hoovaagi"	Hamsalekha	Hemanth Kumar	5:26
2.	"Wah Wah Khana"	Hamsalekha	Udit Narayan	5:51
3.	"Ee Bhoomi"	Hamsalekha	Hemanth Kumar	5:42
4.	"Nanna Nechhina Koteya"	Hamsalekha	Kunal Ganjawala, Chithra	5:26
5.	"Hanatheya Adiyalle"	Hamsalekha	Shankar Mahadevan	3:57
6.	"Dayavillada Dharmavu"	Basavanna	M. M. Keeravani	2:58
7.	"Barappa O Thingala Mava"	Hamsalekha	Kunal Ganjawala	5:08
8.	"Akka Kelavva"	Akka Mahadevi	Nanditha	4:51
9.	"Ninna Nenapinali"	Hamsalekha	Rajesh Krishnan, Chithra	4:54
10.	"Alimola Alimola"	Hamsalekha	Rajesh Krishnan, Chithra	2:37
11.	"Mysore Desh"	Hamsalekha	Jayateerth Mevundi	1:40
12.	"Sampige Siddesha"	Hamsalekha	Hemanth Kumar	1:53
Total length:				50:13

== Critical reception ==
R. G. Vijayasarathy of IANS wrote that "Kallarali Hoovaagi is a top line film which is a must see for all film buffs who look for quality in films. Even for the so called mass audience, it will be a good package of good entertainment values". A critic from Rediff.com wrote that "Long story short, Kallarali Hoovaagi is that modern day rarity -- a must see film for all ages, all classes, everywhere".

== Awards ==
54th National Film Awards

- Nargis Dutt Award for Best Feature Film on National Integration

2006–07 Karnataka State Film Awards

- Best Editor – Basavaraj Urs
- Best Art Direction – Vittal
- Special Jury Award (Costume Design) – Nagini Bharana, Roshni Dinaker

== See also ==
- Janumada Jodi
