= Cyanide (2006 film) =

2006 film by A. M. R. Ramesh

- Film poster
- Directed by: A. M. R. Ramesh
- Written by: A. M. R. Ramesh
- Produced by: B. Kenchappa Gowda
- Starring: Ravi Kale; Rangayana Raghu; Malavika Avinash; Tara; Avinash
- Narrated by: Prakash Raj
- Cinematography: R. Rathnavelu
- Edited by: Anthony
- Music by: Sandeep Chowta
- Production company: Akshaya Creations
- Distributed by: Halappa Creations
- Release date: 7 July 2006
- Running time: 115 minutes
- Country: India
- Language: Kannada

Cyanide is an Indian 2006 Kannada-language drama film written and directed by A. M. R. Ramesh. The plot of the film set in and around Bangalore from 1st to 20th August 1991, deals with incidents surrounding the assassins of former Indian Prime Minister Rajiv Gandhi. It stars Ravi Kale as Sivarasan (One-eyed Jack), the mastermind of the assassination. Malavika Avinash, Tara, Rangayana Raghu in pivotal roles. The supporting cast features Avinash, Nassar and Suresh Heblikar. The film was dubbed in Tamil as Kuppi.

Upon theatrical release on 7 July 2006, the film received widespread critical acclaim. Critics acclaimed the film's narration, the acting performances of Ravi Kale, Rangayana Raghu, Tara and Malavika Avinash, and the camerawork and editing of the film. At the 2006–07 Karnataka State Film Awards the film won two awards – Third Best Film and Best Actress (Tara). For his portrayal of Ranganath, who sheltered the assassins, Raghu was awarded the Best Supporting Actor at the 54th Filmfare Awards South. The film is seen by some critics as one of the finest films ever made in Kannada cinema.

== Cast ==
- Ravi Kale as Sivarasan
- Rangayana Raghu as Puttenahalli Ranganath
- Malavika Avinash as Shubha
- Tara as Mridula
- Avinash as DCP Kempaiah, Bangalore City
- Nassar as DIG Karthikeyan, Chennai City
- Suresh Heblikar
- Usha Bandari
- Muni
- Sandeep
- Ashok Rao
- Sampath Kumar
- Naveen
- Mohan Raj
- Manjunath
- Bank Janardhan as constable

== Critical reception ==
Reviewing the film, R. G. Vijayasarathy of IANS said it "shocks and surprises", and wrote, "[Its] dialogues are crisp, narration has good pace, camera angles and lighting match the mood and the background score fits perfectly." He added, "It is an outstanding effort that needs appreciation and applause." The reviewer of Viggy.com felt the film's USPs were "its gripped narration, simplistic presentation" and "the style of picturising a dynamic story in an entertaining way". He concluded praising the performance of all the lead characters in the film. Sify.com commended the performance of the cast and added, "The camera work of Ratnavelu on the proceedings of 20 days of life of Shivarasan & gang is very effectively shown on screen, while Sandeep Chowta?s background score is awesome." A critic from Chitraloka.com wrote that "This is not at all disappointing. This is one and half hour film coolly watchable".

== Accolades ==
2006–07 Karnataka State Film Awards

- Third Best Film
- Best Actress – Tara

54th Filmfare Awards South

- Best Supporting Actor – Kannada – Rangayana Raghu
