= Hebbet Ramakka =

- Directed by: N. R. Nanjundegowda
- Written by: N. R. Nanjundegowda
- Produced by: S. A. Puttaraju; Kavitha Raj
- Starring: Tara; Devaraj
- Music by: Poornachandra Tejaswi
- Production company: Saviraj Cinemaas
- Release date: 27 April 2018
- Country: India
- Language: Kannada

Hebbet Ramakka (transl. Illiterate Ramakka) is a 2018 Indian Kannada political drama film written and directed by N. R. Nanjundegowda and produced by S. A. Puttaraju. The film stars Tara in the lead protagonist role along with Devaraj. The score and soundtrack for the film is by Poornachandra Tejaswi.

At the 65th National Film Awards, the film won the Best Feature Film in Kannada award. The film made its theatrical release on 27 April 2018.

== Cast ==
- Tara as Ramakka
- Devaraj as Kalleshanna, Ramakka's husband
- Nagaraj Murthy
- Kappanna
- Hiral
- Hanumanthegowda

== Soundtrack ==
Hebbet Ramakka

Soundtrack album by Poornachandra Tejaswi
- Genre: Feature film soundtrack
- Language: Kannada
- Label: Ananda Audio
- Producer: Poornachandra Tejaswi

The film's background score and the soundtracks are composed by Poornachandra Tejaswi. The music rights were acquired by Ananda Audio.

Tracklist
| No. | Title | Lyrics | Singer(s) | Length |
|---|---|---|---|---|
| 1. | "Hebbettu Ramakka" | Poornachandra Tejaswi | Pancham Jeeva, Esha Suchi |
| 2. | "Avarbitt Ivaryaaru" | Dr. Ramalingappa Beguru | Vijay Prakash |
| 3. | "Gudisabekavva Kasava" | S. G. Siddaramaiah | Manoj Vasishta |
