= Karunamayi =

Hindu spiritual leader

Sri Amma Karunamayi
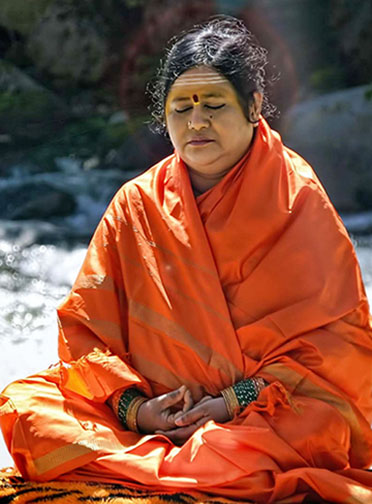
- Sri Amma Karunamayi, Atlanta 2014

Personal life
- Born: 24 October 1958 Andhra Pradesh, India
- Notable work: "Sri Vidya – Divine Radiance Within"

Religious life
- Religion: Hinduism
- Philosophy: Advaita Vedanta

Religious career
- Teacher: God

Quotation

"Love only is Self-Realization."

Amma Sri Karunamayi (born Vijayeswari; 24 October 1958) is a Hindu spiritual figure, yogi, humanitarian and guru. Karunamayi is translated as "she who is permeated with compassion".

Her disciples consider her to be an incarnation of Saraswati, who is the consort the creator god Brahma.

Karunamayi travels internationally promoting global peace, meditation and the spiritual upliftment of humanity.

== Early life ==
Vijayeswari was born in Gudur, Andrah Pradesh in South India on 24 October 1958. The day coincided with Vijayadashami, the tenth day of Navaratri, a major Hindu festival.

Karunamayi's mother was a devotee of Bhagawan Ramana Maharshi. On one rare occasion Ramana whispered to Karunamayi's mother that she would give birth to "Thai" or the divine mother who would help heal the planet. Encouraged by her parents, Karunamayi spent her childhood on spiritual paths immersed in prayer and worship.

On June 9th, 1980, after attending college for one year, Vijayeswari left her home in Bangalore for the secluded jungle of Kanva Ksendra (Penusila Kshetram) in Andhra Pradesh. She was approximately 21 when she began her life of intensive meditation and ascetism.

According to Karunamayi's biography and other sources, there was no familial resistance to her choice of ascetism and a spiritually hermetic lifestyle. Some female gurus were never married away (as per customs), though their desire to remain unmarried caused conflict in their families; ie. Ammachi. However in the instance of Karunamayi, the issue does not seem to have created conflict in her family. Yet in all these cases, the status as guru is largely constituted by their present asceticism.

After performing spiritual austerities alone in the forest for fourteen years, she founded a hermitage and charitable institution called Sri Mathru Devi Viswa Shanthi Ashram on the outskirts of the forest at Penusila. Some time later she created the Karunamayi Shanthi Dhama ashram in the city of Bangalore.

In 1995 Karunamayi began touring internationally (United States, Canada, Europe, Asia, Australia) and throughout India in order to promote humanitarian issues, world peace, health and education for the underprivileged and meditation.

== Darshan and Programs ==
Sri Karunamayi gives darshan to the public and her devotees through several means.

=== Individual or personal blessings ===
One receives a blank card to write down their questions, concerns or problems (spiritual or worldly). In order, individuals approach Karunamayi and give her their card. Karunamayi then gives each person an individual or personal blessing. She may also directly address specific matters or engage in conversation.

=== Meditation and Retreats ===
Karunamayi's central message is for one to achieve higher levels of awareness through the regular practice of meditation, saying sadhana will produce real spiritual progress and Divine knowledge. She regularly gives meditation retreats so as to help improve the practices of the individual meditator and propel them along the path towards liberation. One or multi day meditations with Karunamayi are offered during tours or in the Penusila ashram.

=== Discourses ===
Karunamayi engages attendees and devotees with talks or discourses during public events. Many such talks are spontaneous, with far ranging topics discussed. Often speaking about anything from Vedic principles, to world events, to astrology or to meditation advice.

=== Homas or Pujas ===
Homas, or Vedic fire ceremonies, are performed several times during Karunamayi's visits to North America as well as in India. They are aimed for the material and spiritual well-being of all those who attend.

== Avatar ==
Sri Amma Karunamayi's followers claim her to be an Avatar, a manifestation of Divine Mother who is born enlightened or fully self-realized. She is called Amma by her devotees, which means "mother" in her native Telugu language and other South Indian languages. Sri Karunamayi Amma is the third incarnation of Divine Mother since the birth of the Creator, the first two being Sati Devi and Parvati Devi.

Karunamayi, according to Karen Pechilis, is identified with Saraswati, Bala Tripurasundari, Lalita (Parvati), and Lakshmi. Further stating that female Hindu gurus are differentiated from female Hindu saints by the predominant qualities of shakti and/or bhakti they display. The guru identifies with the Goddess as well as their connection to teaching and to their chelas (students), which includes initiations, instruction and philosophical precepts.

According to her devotees, Karunamayi is a "poorna avatar," a full incarnation of the Goddess (Devi). Identifying her as the incarnation of Saraswati, the goddess of wisdom, music, speech and the arts in Hindu cosmology.

== Ashrams and Institutions ==
Karunamayi founded the Sri Mathru Devi Viswa §manthi Ashram on the outskirts of the forest at Penusila at the conclusion of her austerities (tapas) in the early 1990's. This institution also houses the SMVA (Sri Matrudevi Viswashanti Ashram) Trust.

Soon after, the Shanthi Dhama ashram, in the city of Bangalore was created at the request of devotees who wished her to maintain a more urban presence.

In 2006, Karunamayi founded her first North American ashram, the SRIM Center (Srikarunamayi Research Institute of Meditation) in Forsyth, GA. Retreats, festivals, pujas and homas take place here during her North American tours.

== Humanitarian Works ==
Karunamayi's first concentrated works of charity and providing relief to the suffering and underprivileged began in the Penusila Forest area. The same area where she had maintained her life of ascetism for over 14 years. The first school was inaugurated in 1994 and included classes for math, science, arts, languages and social studies. All programs were free and available to the hundreds of thousands of local villagers.

She draws attention to both practical and spiritual ideals in her humanitarian works. Stating meditation is needed in order to achieve inner virtues (as compassion, truthfulness, wisdom, forgiveness and unconditional love) but “selfless service to mankind and to others is the best yoga"

=== Programs in India ===
Karunamayi has since created many charitable programs to help the rural, disenfranchised and the extremely poor in Andhra Pradesh. These provide free educational facilities, housing projects, clean water programs, a free hospital, mobile medical clinics, emergency relief programs, food and clothing donations and free housing for people who had been dispossessed of their land.

In 2008, Karunamayi founded the Jubilee Free Housing Project, an initiative to create durable homes for families in need.

She opened a free 100-bed hospital for a community of over 500,000 impoverished local villagers. A mobile medical van also visits rural areas to provide free care.

Healthcare for women and children has been a priority for Karunamayi. Via the SMVA Trust (a non-profit organization), she runs a number of charitable projects to uplift underserved populations. These include a free hospital (established in 2002) located in Andhra Pradesh, two schools (established in 1994) that provide education to hundreds of children; a water sanitation program that, to date, has opened 32 water treatment plants providing thousands of people access to clean drinking water.

In addition, under Amma’s direction, the SMVA Trust has sponsored efforts such as mobility aids for disabled individuals as well as projects building safe, enclosed housing and bathrooms for women and girls.

=== Global Programs ===
Karunamayi and the SMVA Trust are also active in numerous charitable activities across the globe.

In 2012, she began conducting free medical camps in the United States with doctors from a wide range of specialties including Orthopedics, Dentistry, Cardiology, Neurology and Optometry. Recently, Cancer Education and Early-Detection (CEED) programs have been included in Amma’s Free Medical Camps. By providing this service to people, anyone who sees a physician at one of Karunamayi’s Free Medical Camps and is diagnosed with cancer, qualifies to receive completely free medical care throughout the duration of their battle with cancer.

Her organization, Narayana Seva (Annadanam), distributes free food with the help from volunteers across the world, including the U.K, United States, South America, and Canada.

=== Peace Initiatives ===
Karunamayi has led many peace initiatives such as peace marches and peace prayers. In 2011 she held a World Peace Prayer with participants from over 60 countries at ‘Ground Zero’, the site of the 9/11 tragedy in New York City, USA.

=== Environmentalism ===
Citing humanity's coexistence with nature, Karunamayi has repeatedly made light of the impact of electronic radiation, CO2 emissions, pollution etc and their respective current impact on bees, weather, crops and trees in countless discourses, talks and interviews.

== Honours ==
US Congressman Danny Davis of the Seventh Congressional District of Illinois presented the Golden Eagle Award 2012 to Her Holiness Amma Sri Karunamayi : Bhagavathi Sri Sri Sri Vijayeswari Devi, Founder President of S.M.V.A. Trust, Sri Manidweepa Mahasamsthanam, Nellore District, Andhra Pradesh, India, in recognition of her selfless service and dynamic leadership in providing numerous welfare programs for the underprivileged.

Karunamayi’s work for the world’s underprivileged and underrepresented was recognized by the United States Congress, former (39th) president of the United States Jimmy Carter, and the United Nations. She spoke at the UN's International Day of Peace in 2015 in New York City.

She is in the U.S. Congressional Record recognized by Congressman Bill Foster, for her life of service and "Her charitable works in India".

The New Jersey State Assembly passed a resolution presented by then Deputy Speaker Upendra Chivukula for her "selfless and unwavering dedication to humanitarian endeavors".

In Toronto, Canada, she was recognized for 10 years of service by former Member of the Provincial Parliament Tony Ruprecht, through a motion introduced by then M.P.P. Bas Balkissoon.

== Publications and documentaries ==
Karunamayi has authored several books, most notably the Blessed Souls series. An amalgamation of edited discourses that have taken place over the years while she was on North American tours. These form a basis of her teachings arranged in a straightforward and presentable manner. She has also written extensively on the topic of mantras, most notably about the Gayatri Mantra, Sri Lalita and the Sri Mahishasura Mardini mantras. Her books about meditation include titles such as Divine Wisdom and Keys to Sadhana. These three branches; teachings, mantras and meditation form the basis of the books she has released.

A biographical book written about her life called, Sri Karunamayi: A Biography, authored by Murugan Murugan was released in January 2002.

There are also numerous audio CDs of Sri Karunamayi singing mantras and bhajans.

Karunamayi is featured in various spiritual documentaries and films.

- 2009 Souljourns 1 Amma Sri Karunamayi - Love and Wisdom Pour Fourth by Ted Henry
- 2010 Souljourns 2 Amma Sri Karunamayi - Her Love Knows No Bounds by Ted Henry (a further 7 Souljourns full and mini documentaries were made by Ted Henry)
- 2015 Amma Sri Karunamayi - Buddha at the Gas Pump Interview
- 2016 The Blazing Heart - A Portrait of the Hindu Saint, Amma Sri Karunamayi by Bob Peck
- 2025 2025 Guru Poornima Divine Discourse by Karunamayi.
- 2026 Ongoing Discourses, Interviews, Weekly Telecasts, Bhajans and Sri Lalita Sahasranama Mahima Episodes by Karunamayi.

Karunamayi has a weekly television program, transmitted in India on Gemini TV, Bhakti TV and YouTube.
