= Karnataka State Film Award for Best Supporting Actress =

Indian film award

- State award for contributions to Kannada cinema
- Awarded for: Best Acting by an Actress in Supporting Role
- Sponsored by: Government of Karnataka
- Rewards: Silver Medal; ₹ 20,000
- First award: 1967-68
- Final award: 2021
- Most recent winner: Umashree

Highlights
- Total awarded: 53
- First winner: Pandari Bai

Karnataka State Film Award for Best Supporting Actress is a film award of the Indian state of Karnataka given during the annual Karnataka State Film Awards. The award honours Kannada-language films.

== Superlative winners ==
• Leelavathi	8 Awards
• Umashree	6 Awards

== Award winners ==
The following is the complete list of award winners and the films for which they won.

Year	Image	Winner	Film	Role
1967-68	–	Pandari Bai	Belli Moda	Lalitha
1968-69	–	Pandari Bai	Namma Makkalu	Padma
1969-70		Leelavathi	Gejje Pooje	Aparna
1970-71	–	M. Jayashree	Amara Bharathi	
1971-72		Leelavathi	Sipayi Ramu	Yamuna
1972-73	–	Shubha	Naagarahaavu	Margaret
1973-74	–	Advani Lakshmi Devi	Gandhada Gudi	Saraswathamma
1974-75	–	Bhargavi Narayan	Professor Huchuraya	
1975-76	–	Padma Kumuta	Chomana Dudi	Belli
1976-77	–	Jayalakshmi	Bayalu Daari	Indira
1977-78	–	Lakshmi Krishnamurthy	Tabbaliyu Neenade Magane	Thayavva
1978-79	–	L. V. Sharada	Vathsalya Patha	Malathi
1979-80	–	Uma Shivakumar	Chandanada Gombe	Eeri
1980-81		Pramila Joshai	Sangeetha	
1981-82	–	Mamatha Rao	Praya Praya Praya	Malini
1982-83	–	Archana Rao	Phaniyamma	
1983-84	–	Kamanidharan	Anubhava	Seethakka
1984-85		Arundhati Nag	Accident	Mayarani
1985-86	–	Shashikala	Hosa Neeru	Lakshmi
1986-87	–	Jayanthi	Anand	Kamala
1987-88	–	Papamma	Mana Mechchida Hudugi	Siddavva
1988-89		Umashree	Yaaru Hone	
1989-90		Leelavathi	Doctor Krishna	Lakshmidevamma
1990-91		Girija Lokesh	Bhujangayyana Dashavathara	Parvathamma
1991-92		Sukanya Kulkarni	Pathitha Pavani	
1992-93		Umashree	Sangya Balya	Paravva
1993-94		Tara	Munjaneya Manju	Hema
1994-95		Umashree	Kotreshi Kanasu	Nagamma
1995-96	–	Pooja Lokesh	Huliya	Rekha
1996-97		B. Jayashree	Nagamandala	Kurudavva
1997-98		Bhavana	Nee Mudida Mallige	Ranjini
1998-99	–	Jayanthi	Tuvvi Tuvvi Tuvvi	Mariya Peter Breganzha
1999-2000		Vinaya Prasad	Bannada Hejje	Seetha
2000-01		Umashree	Kurigalu Saar Kurigalu	Rukmini
2001-02		M. N. Lakshmi Devi	Kalla Police	
2002-03	–	Arundhati Jatkar	Artha	Rani
2003-04		Umashree	Mani	Shanthakka
2004-05	–	B. Jaya	Gowdru	
2005-06		Arundathi Nag	Jogi	Bhagyakka
2006-07		Neethu	Koti Chennaiah	Deyi Badithi
2007-08		Smitha	Avva	Savanthri
2008-09		Lakshmi	Vamshi	Mother
2009-10		Chandrakala Mohan	Runaanubandha	Mother
2010-11		Harshika Poonachha	Thamassu	Amrin Saba
2011		Girija Lokesh	Sidlingu	Rangamma
2012		Aruna Balraj	Olavina Ole	
2013	–	Bhageerathi Bai Kadam	Agasi Parlour	
2014		B. Jayashree	Kaudi	Ambavva
2015	–	Pooja S. M.	Thithi	Kaveri
2016	–	Akshata Pandavpura	Pallata	
2017	–	Rekha	Mooka Nayaka	Kaveri
2018		Veena Sundar	Aa Karaala Ratri	Gowramma
2019		Anusha Krishna	Brahmi	
2020		Manjulamma	Danthapurana	
2021		Umashree	Rathnan Prapancha	Saroja Bai

== See also ==
- Cinema of Karnataka
- List of Kannada-language films
