= B. S. Lingadevaru =

Indian television and film director

B.S. LingaDevaru
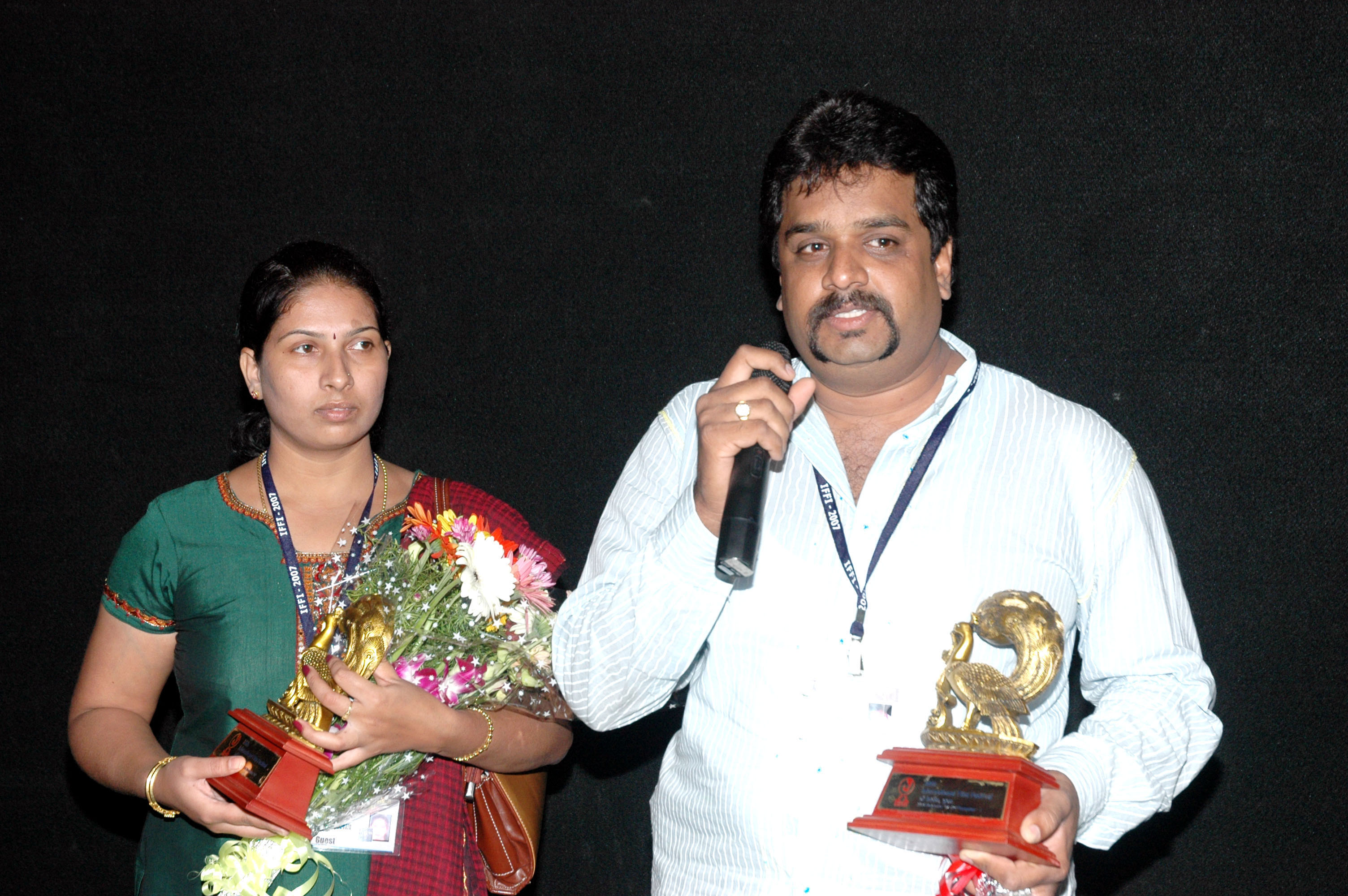
- Lingadevaru in 2007
- Occupations: Actor, producer, director

B. S. Lingadevaru is an Indian actor, producer and film director who works predominantly in Kannada cinema. He is the recipient of State and National Film Awards. He is known for his films Naanu Avanalla...Avalu, Mouni, and Kaada Beladingalu.

== Filmography ==
- Mouni (2003)
- Kaada Beladingalu (2007)
- Naanu Avanalla...Avalu (2015)

=== Awards ===
- Second Best Kannada Film Award at the 8th BIFFes, 2016 for Naanu Avanalla...Avalu.
