= A. M. R. Ramesh =

Indian film director

- Born: 20 October 1969 (age 56); Hanumantha Nagar, Bengaluru, India
- Other name: AMR
- Occupations: Director, Producer, Screenwriter, Actor
- Years active: 2004 – present
- Spouse: S. Indumathi

A. M. R. Ramesh is an Indian film director and producer who has directed several Kannada films. Apart from films, he had directed several serials and telefilms for Sun Network at the beginning of his career.

The director rose to fame upon his second venture Cyanide. In 2013, he was in media attention regarding his latest biopic on forest dacoit Veerappan.

== Personal details ==
A. M. R. Ramesh was born in Bangalore, Karnataka, India.

== Filmography ==
Year	Film	Notes
2004	Santhosha	Credited as M. R. Ramesh; also choreographed the song "Chamile Chamile"
2006	Cyanide	
2008	Minchina Ota	
2010	Police Quarters	
2013	Attahasa	Also actor
2016	Game	Simultaneously shot in Tamil as Oru Melliya Kodu; also actor
