= Karnataka Chalanachitra Academy =

- Abbreviation: KCA
- Formation: 26 July 2009; 17 years ago
- Type: Governmental department
- Purpose: Film Cultural
- Headquarters: Badami House, Opp. to BBMP Office
- Location: Bangalore
- Official language: Kannada
- President: Sadhu Kokila
- Website: Karnataka Chalanachitra Academy

Karnataka Chalanachitra Academy (English: Karnataka Film Academy) was formed by the Government of Karnataka in 2009 to promote film culture in Karnataka. The academy has taken up several projects to develop a healthy film culture in the state and adopted the motto of promoting 'Education in Cinema and Cinema in Education'.

== Activities ==
Karnataka Chalanachitra Sanstha (Karnataka Movie Academy) has been conducting Film Appreciation Courses in different parts of the Karnataka state, in colleges and film societies. It has also promoted the establishment of district, institutional and campus film societies all over the state. It engaged the members of these societies to participate in the first-ever Karnataka Chalanachitra Sanstha Antarjatiya Chalanachitra Utsava (English: Karnataka Film Academy International Film Festival), a low-budget event with DVD screenings of 100 films, which found overwhelming response in Bengaluru and four other districts of Karnataka.

SV Rajendrasingh has been heading the academy as Mukhya Adhyaksha (English: Chief President) since 2014.

The academy is mandated by the government to conduct the 6th BIFFES (Bangalore International Film Festival), the international film festival in Bengaluru, from 26 December 2013, for a week, showcasing the Chalanachitra Parishrama Alli Uttama (English: Best in Cinema) from around the world.

== Belli Hejje ==
Belli Hejje is a program arranged by the academy every month. In this event, the academy invites an eminent personality from the field of Cinema to discuss their careers, experiences and achievements.

Participants of Belli Hejje are:

† indicates celebrity couple

Participant	Designation	Date
Parvathamma Rajkumar	Producer	14 November 2009
Dwarakish	Actor, producer, director	18 December 2009
B. Saroja Devi	Actress	2 January 2010
Siddalingaiah	Director	13 February 2010
Jayanthi	Actress	13 March 2010
Geethapriya	Lyricist, Director	10 April 2010
K. C. N. Gowda	Producer	15 May 2010
Leelavathi	Actress	12 June 2010
K. S. L. Swamy	Actor, director	10 July 2010
Harini	Actress	14 August 2010
P. B. Srinivas	Playback singer	4 September 2010
Bharathi Vishnuvardhan	Actress	9 October 2010
S. K. Bhagavan	Director	13 November 2010
M. N. Lakshmi Devi	Actress	11 December 2010
• R. N. Sudarshan • Shylashri†	• Actor • Actress	9 January 2011
C. V. Shivashankar	Lyricist, director	12 February 2011
Rajesh	Actor	9 April 2011
Rajan	Music Director	14 May 2011
Prathima Devi Shankar Singh	Actress	11 June 2011
S. Shivaram	Actor, producer	9 July 2011
S. D. Ankalagi	Producer	13 August 2011
Sowkar Janaki	Actress	10 September 2011
Anant Nag	Actor	8 October 2011
Srinath	Actor	12 November 2011
Ambareesh	Actor	28 December 2011
K. Janakiram	Cinematographer, director	28 January 2012
Ashok	Actor	11 February 2012
B. Jaya	Actress	24 March 2012
Hamsalekha	Lyricist, music director	April 2012
Mukhyamantri Chandru	Actor	26 May 2012
K. Sundarnath Suvarna	Cinematographer	23 June 2012
M. S. Umesh	Actor	28 July 2012
Kunigal Nagabhushan	Writer, actor	25 August 2012
S. V. Rajendra Singh Babu	Director	22 September 2012
C. H. Lokanath	Actor	27 October 2012
Ramesh Aravind	Actor, director	17 November 2012
K. V. Gupta		8 December 2012
Ramesh Bhat	Actor	19 January 2013
H. R. Bhargava	Director	16 February 2013
B. K. Sumithra	Playback singer	16 March 2013
Srinivasa Murthy	Actor	25 May 2013
Bhavya	Actress	31 August 2013
Ramakrishna	Actor	28 September 2013
Suresh Heblikar	Actor, director	26 October 2013
Kashinath	Actor, director	30 November 2013
• M. K. Sundar Raj • Prameela Joshai†	• Actor • Actress	15 February 2014
Joe Simon	Director	24 May 2014
Honnavalli Krishna	Actor	28 June 2014
Jai Jagadish	Actor, producer	26 July 2014
V. Ravichandran	Actor, director	12 September 2014
T. S. Nagabharana	Director	7 August 2015
M. N. Kumar	Producer	11 September 2015
Doddanna	Actor	14 November 2015
Shiva Rajkumar	Actor	30 November 2015
Girish Kasaravalli	Director	21 December 2015
Sa. Ra. Govindu	Producer	8 January 2016
Sudha Rani	Actress	2 July 2016
H. D. Gangaraju		25 July 2016
Lakshmi	Actress	7 August 2016
M. Bhakthavathsala	Producer	17 September 2016
K. C. N. Chandrashekar	Producer	26 December 2016
Nagathihalli Chandrashekar	Director	16 March 2017
P. Sheshadri	Director	10 July 2017
P. R. Ramadas Naidu	Director	2 September 2017
G. Manoharan Naidu		10 October 2017
Baraguru Ramachandrappa	Writer, director	9 November 2017
Suresh Urs	Editor	17 November 2017
Om Sai Prakash	Director	14 July 2018
H. G. Dattatreya	Actor	27 July 2018
B. L. Venu	Writer	6 October 2018
S. A. Chinnegowda	Producer	15 June 2019
Vijaya Reddy	Director	27 July 2019
Richard Castelleno	Director	3 August 2019

== Belli Cinema Belli Maathu ==
Film	Date
Lift Man	29 July 2017
Kaudi	15 July 2017
1st Rank Raju	22 April 2017
Chomana Dudi	1 April 2017
Pallata	18 March 2017
Rama Rama Re...	4 March 2017
Krishna Leela	21 January 2017
Naagarahaavu	31 December 2016
Godhi Banna Sadharana Mykattu	5 November 2016
Kempammana Court Case	22 October 2016
Karva	20 August 2016
Belli Kirana	16 July 2016
Last Bus	25 June 2016
Ashtavakra	18 June 2016
Ishtakamya	4 June 2016
Arivina Mane	28 May 2016
Bombeyaata	21 May 2016
Alemaariya Athmakathe	7 May 2016
Babruvahana	30 April 2016
Sandhya Raga	23 April 2016
Kranthiveera Sangolli Rayanna	2 April 2016
Haggada Kone	5 March 2016
Puta Thirugisi Nodi	27 February 2016
Vidaaya	20 February 2016
Thamassu	16 January 2016
Mythri	2 January 2016
RangiTaranga	26 December 2015
Prarthane	19 December 2015
Edegarike	5 December 2015
Munseefa	21 November 2015
Konchavaram	7 November 2015
Bharath Stores	31 October 2015
Chithramandiradalli	17 October 2015
Ingale Marga	10 October 2015
Agasi Parlour	3 October 2015
Thallana	19 September 2015
Eradu Kanasu	12 September 2015
Haadu Hakki Haadu	29 August 2015
Hajj	22 August 2015
Gandhi	15 August 2015
Prakruthi	8 August 2015
December-1	25 July 2015
Harivu	18 July 2015

== Festivals ==
- Bangalore International Film Festival
- KCA International Film Festival – in collaboration with the Federation of Film Societies of India (FFSI)

== Also Read ==
- Bangalore International Film Festival
