= 2014 Karnataka State Film Awards =

Annual Indian film awards ceremony

- Date: 2016
- Location: Mysore
- Country: India

The Karnataka State Film Awards 2014, presented by the Government of Karnataka, recognised the best of Kannada Cinema releases in the year 2014.

== Lifetime achievement award ==
Name of Award	Awardee(s)	Awarded As
• Dr. Rajkumar Award • Puttanna Kanagal Award • Dr. Vishnuvardhan Award	• Basant Kumar Patil • Baraguru Ramachandrappa • Suresh Urs	• Producer • Director • Editor

== Jury ==
A committee headed by K. Shivarudraiah was appointed to evaluate the awards. He said that the committee watched 73 films watched in 45 days before shortlisting 12 for a "re-watch in the second round".

== Film awards ==
Name of Award	Film	Producer	Director
First Best Film	Harivu	Avinash U. Shetty	Manjunath S. Reddy
Second Best Film	Abhimanyu	Arjun Sarja	Arjun Sarja
Third Best Film	Haggada Kone	• Dayal Padmanabhan • Umesh Banakar	Dayal Padmanabhan
Best Film Of Social Concern	Brahmashri Narayana Guru Swamy		
Best Children Film	Baanaadi	Dhruthi Nagaraj	Nagaraj Kote
Best Regional Film	Vishada Male (Tulu language)		
Best Entertaining Film	Gajakesari	• Jayanna • Bhogendra	S. Krishna
Best Debut Film Of Newcomer Director	Ulidavaru Kandanthe	• Hemanth • Simple Suni • Abhi	Rakshit Shetty

== Other awards ==
Name of Award	Film	Awardee(s)
Best Direction	Harivu	Manjunath S. Reddy
Best Actor	Naanu Avanalla...Avalu	Sanchari Vijay
Best Actress	Vidaaya	Lakshmi Gopalaswamy
Best Supporting Actor	Nayakanahatti Sri Tipperudraswamy Mahatme	Arun Devasya
Best Supporting Actress	Kaudi	B. Jayashree
Best Child Actor	Sachin! Tendulkar Alla	Snehith
Best Child Actress	Aata Paata	Lahari
Best Music Direction	Ulidavaru Kandanthe	B. Ajaneesh Loknath
Best Male Playback Singer	Gajakesari ("Saahore Saahore")	Chintan Vikas
Best Female Playback Singer	Sachin! Tendulkar Alla ("Kanne Illada Mele")	Vidya Mohan
Best Cinematography	Rhaatee	Satya Hegde
Best Editing	Ugramm	Srikanth
Best Lyrics	Kaudi ("Belaka Battaleyolage")	Hulikunte Murthy
Best Art Direction	143 Nooranalavathmooru	Chandrakantha
Best Story Writer	Naanu Avanalla...Avalu	Living Smile Vidya
Best Screenplay	Vidaaya	P. Sheshadri
Best Dialogue Writer	Thippaji Circle	B. L. Venu
Jury's Special Award	Jyothi Alias Kothiraj	Jyothiraj (For Stunts)
