= Karnataka State Film Award for Best Book on Kannada Cinema =

- State award for contributions to Kannada cinema
- Awarded for: Best Book on Kannada Cinema
- Sponsored by: Government of Karnataka
- Rewards: Silver Medal; ₹ 20000
- First award: 2014

Highlights
- Total awarded: 9
- First winner: Touch Screen
- Recent winner: Antarangada Anna

The Karnataka State Film Award for Best Book on Kannada Cinema is a film award of the Indian state of Karnataka given during the annual Karnataka State Film Awards. The award honors the authors who wrote the books related to the topics of Kannada Cinema.

== Winners ==
Year	Book	Publisher	Author	Refs.
2014	Touch Screen	K. M. Veeresh	Uday Marakini	
2015	Dr. Rajkumar Samagra Charithre	Preethi Prakashana	Doddahullur Rukkoji	
2016	Nenapina Mutthina Haara	Ankitha Pusthaka	S. V. Rajendra Singh Babu	
2017	Cinema Samaya	Sahitya Prakashana	Gangadhar Modaliar	
2018	Chitrakathe Hagendarenu?	Karnataka Chalanachitra Academy	N. S. Shankar	
2018	Ambarish: Vyakti-Vyaktitva-Varnaranjita Baduku	Sawanna Books	Sharanu Hullur	
2019	Belli Tore – Cinema Prabandhagalu	Ankitha Pusthaka	C. H. Raghunath	
2020	Namo Venkatesha	Annapurna Prakashana	C. H. Raghunath	
2021	Antarangada Anna	Sirigandha Prakashana	Prakash Raj Mehu	
