= AFTC =

AFTC may refer to:

- Arabinofuranan 3-O-arabinosyltransferase, an enzyme
- Air Force Test Center
- Air Force Technical College, Bangalore
