= Karnataka State Film Award for Best Actress =

Indian film award

- Awarded for: Award for Best Performance of an actress in Leading Role
- Sponsored by: Government of Karnataka
- Rewards: Silver Medal; ₹ 20,000
- First award: 1967–68
- Final award: 2021
- Most recent winner: Archana Jois

Highlights
- Total awarded: 55
- First winner: Kalpana

The Karnataka State Film Award for Best Actress is a film award of the Indian state of Karnataka given during the annual Karnataka State Film Awards. The award honours Kannada language film actresses. Aarathi, Jayanthi and Tara are tied with four wins each, the most by any recipient.

== Winners ==
=== Key ===
Symbol	Meaning
†	Indicates a joint award for that year

List of award recipients, showing the year and film(s)
Year	Image	Recipient(s)	Role(s)	Film(s)	Ref(s)
1967–68		Kalpana	Indira	Belli Moda	
1968–69		Kalpana	Malathi	Hannele Chiguridaga	
1969–70		Bharathi Vishnuvardhan	Chennambike	Sri Krishnadevaraya	
1970–71		Kalpana	Kaveri	Sharapanjara	
1971–72	–	L. V. Sharada	Kathyayini	Vamsha Vriksha	
1972–73	–	Aarathi	Alamelu	Naagarahaavu	
1973–74		Jayanthi†	Madhavi	Edakallu Guddada Mele	
1973–74	–	Nandini Bhaktavatsala†	Kamali	Kaadu	
1974–75	–	A. Revathi		Kankana	
1975–76	–	Aarathi	Munithaayi	Katha Sangama	
1976–77		Jayanthi		Manassinanthe Mangalya	
1977–78	–	Aparna Narang		Spandana	
1978–79	–	Aarathi	Thunga	Dharmasere	
1979–80	–	Vaishali Kasaravalli	Lakshmi	Akramana	
1980–81	–	Aarathi	Ranganayaki / Maala	Ranganayaki	
1981–82		Jayanthi	Putti	Dharma Dari Thappithu	
1982–83	–	Padma Vasanthi	Vasanthi	Maanasa Sarovara	
1983–84	–	Abhinaya	Gowri	Anubhava	
1984–85	–	Roopa Devi		Avala Antharanga	
1985–86		Jayanthi	Chinnamma / Thara Devi	Masanada Hoovu	
1986–87	–	Geetha	Dr. Janaki / Dr. Janavi	Aruna Raaga	
1987–88	–	Usha	Akka Mahadevi	Shivayogi Akkamahadevi	
1988–89	–	Saritha	Banneri	Sankranthi	
1989–90		Sudha Rani	Rukmini	Panchama Veda	
1990–91		Tara	Jaya	Krama	
1991–92		Sudha Rani	Padma	Mysore Mallige	
1992–93		Vinaya Prasad	Vani	Aathanka	
1993–94		Lakshmi	Ramabai	Hoovu Hannu	
1994–95		Shruti	Usha	Aagatha	
1995–96		Prema	Madhuri (Madhu)	Om	
1996–97		Shilpa	Kanaka	Janumada Jodi	
1997–98		Jayamala	Narmada Thaayi / Thaayi Saheba	Thaayi Saheba	
1998–99		Soundarya	Kshama	Doni Saagali	
1999–2000		Tara	Subbamma Heggadithi	Kaanuru Heggadathi	
2000–01		Anu Prabhakar	Kaveri	Shaapa	
2001–02		Soundarya	Naagi	Dweepa	
2002–03		Bhavana	Channi	Kshaama	
2003–04		Radhika Kumaraswamy	Gowri	Thayi Illada Thabbali	
2004–05		Shruti	Gowri	Gowdru	
2005–06		Pavitra Lokesh	Venkatalakshmi	Naayi Neralu	
2006–07		Tara	Mrudula	Cyanide	
2007–08		Umashree	Gulabi	Gulabi Talkies	
2008–09		Radhika Pandit	Chanchala	Moggina Manasu	
2009–10		Anu Prabhakar	Bangari	Pareekshe	
2010–11		Ramya	Geetha	Sanju Weds Geetha	
2011		Bhavana	Bhageerathi	Bhageerathi	
2012	–	Nirmala Chennappa	Jayamma	Tallana	
2013		Nivedhitha	Devakka	December-1	
2014		Lakshmi Gopalaswamy	Meera	Vidaaya	
2015	–	Malashri	Ganga	Ganga	
2016		Sruthi Hariharan	Nandini	Beautiful Manasugalu	
2017		Tara	Ramakka	Hebbet Ramakka	
2018		Meghana Raj	Poorvi	Iruvudellava Bittu	
2019	–	Anupama Gowda	Namana	Thrayambakam	
2020	–	Akshatha Pandavapura	Bindushree	Pinki Elli	
2021	–	Archana Jois	Divya	Mute	

== Superlatives : Multiple winners ==
Wins	Recipient(s)
4	Jayanthi, Aarathi, Tara
3	Kalpana
2	Sudha Rani, Shruti, Soundarya, Anu Prabhakar, Bhavana

== See also ==
- Karnataka State Film Award for Best Actor
- Cinema of Karnataka
- List of Kannada-language films
