= 2000–01 Karnataka State Film Awards =

Annual Indian film awards ceremony

- Date: 16 December 2001
- Location: Dr. B. R. Ambedkar Bhavan, Bengaluru
- Country: India
- Presented by: V. S. Ramadevi (Governor of Karnataka)

The 2000–01 Karnataka State Film Awards were presented by Government of Karnataka to felicitate the best of Kannada Cinema released in the year 2000.

The awards were announced by the Minister of State for Information B. K. Chandrashekar, and M. S. Sathyu, the Chairman of the Film Awards Committee, on 28 May 2001. Sathyu criticized the films of the year, stating that "most of the films were substandard and marked by sex and violence. Women were depicted lowly, and most of the films had no message to convey, leave alone being educative." He added that the films also had "fascist tendency" in them. The winners were announced on 28 May 2001, and awards were given out on 16 December.

== Lifetime achievement award ==
Name of Award	Awardee(s)	Awarded As
Dr. Rajkumar Award	Vijaya Bhaskar	Music Director
Puttanna Kanagal Award	K. V. Jayaram	Director
Lifetime Contribution to Kannada Cinema Award	T. S. Narasimhan	Film and TV series producer

== Film awards ==
Name of Award	Film	Producer	Director
First Best Film	Mussanje	• Beerappa • P. R. Ramadas Naidu	P.R. Ramdas Naidu
Second Best Film	Shaapa	• Channabasavanagowda Patil • Vanaja Patil	Ashok Patil
Third Best Film	Kurigalu Saar Kurigalu	• Jai Jagadish • Vijayalakshmi Singh • Dushyanth Singh	Rajendra Singh Babu
Best Film Of Social Concern	Munnudi	Navyachithra	P. Sheshadri
Best Regional Film	Thudar (Tulu language)		Kodlu Ramakrishna

== Other awards ==
Name of Award	Film	Awardee(s)
Best Director	Mussanje	P. R. Ramadas Naidu
Best Actor	Munnudi	H. G. Dattatreya
Best Actress	Shaapa	Anu Prabhakar
Best Supporting Actor	Mathadana	Avinash
Best Supporting Actress	Kurigalu Saar Kurigalu	Umashree
Best Child Actor	Mussanje	Rohith Bhat
Best Music Direction	Mahalakshmi	N. Govardhan
Best Male Playback Singer	Munnudi ("Kadala Theregalu")	Ramesh Chandra
Best Female Playback Singer	Gatti Mela ("Navileno Kunibeku")	K. S. Chithra
Best Cinematography	Shaapa	Ashok Kashyap
Best Editing	Mussanje	Anil Naidu
Best Lyrics	Sparsha ("Chandakinta Chanda")	Itagi Eeranna
Best Sound Recording	Munnudi	S. Mahendran
Best Story Writer	Munnudi	Bolwar Mahammad Kunhi
Best Screenplay	Shaapa	Ashok Patil
Best Dialogue Writer	Mussanje	P. R. Ramadas Naidu
Jury's Special Award	Munnudi (Costume Designer)	• Jubeda • Anupama Sheshadri

== No award ==
Committee not announce any recipients in following category

- Best Director
- Best Children Film
- Best Child Actress
- Best Art Direction

== Members of the Film Awards Committee ==
- M. S. Sathyu, chairman
- Indira Shivanna
- Vijay Bhaskar
- A. Rajashekar
- Geeta Nagabhushan
- K. Ramaiah
- R. Nagesh
- D. S. Nagaraj
- Somashekar
