= Munnudi =

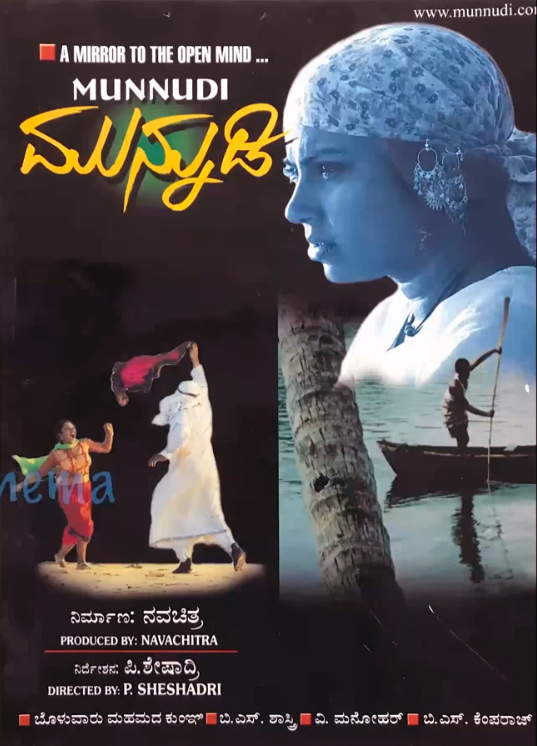
- Film Poster
- Directed by: P. Sheshadri
- Written by: Bolwar Mahammad Kunhi
- Screenplay by: P. Sheshadri; Bolwar Mahammad Kunhi
- Based on: Muthechchera by Bolwar Mahammad Kunhi
- Produced by: M/S Navachitra
- Starring: Tara; H. G. Dattatreya; Shashikumar; Chaya Singh
- Cinematography: B. S. Shastri
- Edited by: B. S. Kemparaju
- Music by: V. Manohar
- Release date: 27 October 2000
- Country: India
- Language: Kannada
- Budget: ₹ 17 lakh
- Box office: ₹ 28 lakh

Munnudi (Kannada: ಮುನ್ನುಡಿ, The Preface) is a 2000 Indian Kannada language film directed by P. Sheshadri, based on Bolwar Mahammad Kunhi's short story Muthucchera, and starring Tara, H. G. Dattatreya, Shashikumar and Chaya Singh in pivotal roles.

The film is about the misuse of Shariat by opportunistic men and the manipulation of the testaments on "Nikah" and "Talaaq".

== Plot ==
Day-to-day practice of any religion goes as per the customs evolved through i find instances of "intelligent" interpretations of these very tenets by unscrupulous people to serve their own interests. One such instance is the exploitation of woman for the sheer thrill of man in a male dominated society taking advantage of the ‘custom’ of ‘marriage’ particularly when the woman is struck by ignorance, fear and poverty.

"Munnudi" is a preface written by the waves of Arabian Sea on the plank of the sand. An untold pain of a woman in a pictorial parody, a mirror to an open mind.

In Sheriah (Islamic Law) prostitution is deliberated as the worst crime on earth, which solicits heavy punishment to the culprit's life after death. "Munnudi" makes an attempt to discuss the misuse of ‘Sheriah’ by certain canny men, who maintain that they could elude both ‘Crime’ and ‘Punishment’ for transgression on woman by sheltering themselves beneath the testaments on ‘Nikha’ and ‘Talaaq’.

Munnudi is the story of a mother of a teenaged girl who lived in a small village on the coast of Arabian Sea, who raised the first dissident cry against the barbarian act of man, the act that every folk was made to believe, that cherished the sanctity of the Holy Book. ‘Munnudi’ is the story of the first woman who burnt her silence against this ritual, wherein every woman of the village was to go to bed as temporary wife with a new alien annually, decorating herself in trousseau.

Munnudi deals with this kind of gender discrimination – a crime perpetrated by man against woman in the guise of ‘marriage’. The story goes like this. Mutthuchera, a tiny seaside village, has a special attraction to Arabian traders who have been regularly coming to this village. They come in a particular ‘season’ and stay on for about three months during which they settle contracts for buying wood, spices, etc. Local traders vie with each other to woo the Arabians to their side by providing them all comforts including ‘temporary wives’. For this, they have evolved an ingenious method. They induce poor local women to agree to a ‘system’ in which they marry the Arabians and live with them as their wives in nearby posh hotels. After about three months, it is time for the Arabians to go back. They give divorce (Talaaq) before leaving. These women return to their huts and wait in silence for the next ‘season’ to become ‘new wife’ for some ‘new’ Arabian husband.

These women get some good money as Meher, as a part of marriage custom every time they marry. There are other inducements as well, like visas for their kith and kin to go to Arab countries for work. There are agents who fix such marriages for a commission. Their trump card is knowledge of Arabic language. For ages, these women have accepted this system as a way of life. No one questions the ‘sanctity’ of such events as everything is done as per the ‘rules’ of marriage (Nikaah) and divorce (Talaq); ‘Meher’ and ‘Visa’ are anyway too tempting for a woman struggling for two meals.

As if by exception, an Arabian who marries Rukhiya develops true love for her. Rukhiya too loves him. He does not divorce her and promises to return soon to take her back with him. Rukhiya gets a daughter (Unnisa) through this marriage. Sixteen years pass by; the Arabian does not return. But Rukhiya's love and hope are so strong that she continues to wait and wards off pressures and inducements for remarriage taking shelter under the fact that she is not divorced.

Meanwhile, sensing the concern of the local youth group, a pious religious leader explains the complexities involved in Nikaah and Talaaq and advises the group to deal with the situation as a social problem. This youth group becomes a stumbling block to the local trader and the agent. Though, the system has to go on, as otherwise the trader suffers. What occurs openly takes the form of secret marriages.

As a part of his job, Hasanabba (the Agent) turns his attention to Rukhiya's daughter. Rukhiya tries to avoid her daughter falling prey to such a system. She wants to marry her off to some local boy. But it proves impossible as no one is prepared to marry a girl whose paternity is not known – not even any member of the youth group!! This stark reality and the mounting pressures of the agent and the trader compel Rukhiya to painfully agree to such a ‘marriage’ for her daughter. But the sight of the corpse (floating in the river) of another girl recently married in such a manner unshackles her pent up anguish. She bursts into the trader's mansion where the marriage proceedings are going on and stuns all the men folk by breaking the marriage of her daughter and vows to ensure that such a marriage will never take place in the village, thus taking a lead to walk away into freedom – freedom from fear and oppression.

This film is based on the short story ‘Mutthuchera’ by Boluwar Mohammad Kunhi, well known for pioneering the projection of various aspects of Muslim Life in Kannada Literature. Boluwar Mohammad Kunhi has won three Sahithya Academy Awards including Fellowship.

With his directorial debut, P. Sheshadri introduced new opportunities for films exploring fresh and sensitive subjects.

== Cast ==
- Tara as Rukhiya
- Dattatreya H.G. as Hasanabba
- Shashikumar as Arab
- Chaya Singh as Unnisa
- Shimoga Venkatesh as Abdullah
- Venkatarao M. P. as Khaji
- Sudheer Attavar as Ubaidulla
- Suresh M.N. as Adam
- Sumukha as Young Unnisa
- Nanditha Yadav as Saramma
- Vidyadhar as Hussain

== Reception ==
Vashistha, the reviewer for Screen felt that director P. Sheshadri "deserves kudos for tackling and highlighting a theme which spells social commitment and which he has handled with diligence" and added that he "has worked on the human sentiments in the film and has made a thoughtful approach in its presentation". The reviewer praised H. G. Dattatreya's performance and wrote that he "outshines everyone in his dialogue delivery, mannerisms and timing."

== Awards ==
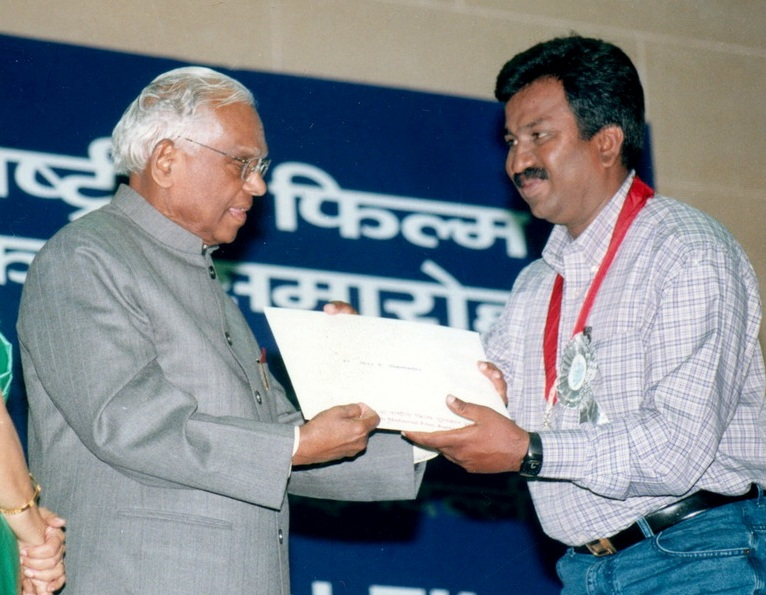
P. Sheshadri receiving the National Film Award for Best Film on Other Social Issues from President K. R. Narayanan

48th National Film Awards

- Best Film on Other Social Issues
- Best Supporting Actor — H. G. Dattatreya

10th Aravindan Puraskaram

- Best Debut Director — P. Sheshadri

2000–01 Karnataka State Film Awards

- Special Film of Social Concern
- Best Story — Bolwar Mahammad Kunhi
- Best Actor — H. G. Dattatreya
- Best Costume Design (Special Award) — Anupama and Jubeda
- Best Male Playback Singer — Ramesh Chandra ("Kadala Theregalu")
- Best Sound Recording — Mahendran

== Participation ==
- International Film Festival of India - 2001
- 6th International Film Festival of Kerala - 2001
- Flanders International Film Festival (Belgium) - 2001
- "A Look Apart" Programme - Minneapolis (USA) - 2001
- 4th International Film Festival (Mumbai) - 2001
- Palm Springs International Film Festival – 2002
