= Shivayogi Sri Puttayyajja =

- Written by: Umesh Puranik Mata
- Produced by: Shyam M Navale and Mukund T Navale
- Starring: Vijay Raghavendra; Shruti; Anu Prabhakar; Shashikumar
- Cinematography: Sathish; Chandru Belavangala
- Edited by: Amith Javalkar
- Music by: Amara Priya
- Production company: Sri Tulaja Bhavani Combines Hubli
- Release date: 5 February 2016
- Running time: 148 minutes
- Country: India
- Language: Kannada

Shivayogi Sri Puttayyajja is a 2016 Indian Kannada biographical film produced by Shyam M Navale and Mukund T Navale under the banner Sri Tulaja Bhavani Combines. Starring Vijay Raghavendra in the title role, the film also featured Shruti, Shashikumar, Anu Prabhakar and Abhijith in other pivotal roles. The film is based on the real life of Pandit Puttaraja Gawai (1914 - 2010), who was a scholar and a Hindustani traditional musician who was well noted for his social services.

The film, upon release was critically acclaimed and won awards at the Karnataka State Awards for Best Social Film and Best Actor to Vijay Raghavendra. The musical score composed and written by Amara Priya.

== Cast ==
- Vijay Raghavendra as Puttaraj Gawai
- Shruti
- Anu Prabhakar
- Shashikumar
- Abhijith
- Bhavyashree Rai
- Shankarlinga Sugnalli
- Ramananda Nayak

== Production ==
Shyam M Navale (Actor, Producer & Distributor), son of the producer Mukund Tuljaram Navale, selected Umesh Puranik for the script. Actor Vijay Raghavendra was initially reluctant to accept the offer to play the title role since it would require a lot of sincere dedication and time. Later he agreed to star in the film with Shruti, Anu Prabhakar and Shashikumar also being roped in to play supporting roles. The film was shot in Gadag, Badami and Pattadakal regions of Karnataka state where Gawai used to live.

=== Legal issues ===
The film faced legal troubles post its shooting and was stayed from its release. The stay order was put forth by producer Maruthi Jediyavar who claimed that he had acquired the rights to do a film on the legendary musician. However, after a certain delay, the court withdrew the stay order and gave a clean chit to release the film. The initial plan to release was on 15 January 2016 which was postponed to 5 February 2016.

== Soundtrack ==
The music of the film was composed by Amara Priya. The soundtrack features 16 tracks which include a poetry compilation of Puttaraj Gawai, Basavanna, Shishunala Sharif and Amara Priya himself.

Track listing
No.	Title	Lyrics	Singer(s)	Length
1.	"Nee Enage Guruvagabekendu"	Puttaraj Gawai	Rajesh Krishnan
2.	"Bhoomigintha Neenu"	Amara Priya	Rajesh Krishnan
3.	"Puttarajaane"	Amara Priya	Sangeetha Katti
4.	"Naana Embudu Naanalla"	Shishunala Sharif	Rajesh Krishnan
5.	"Mathadu Mathadu Lingave"	Janapada	Uday, Vasundhara
6.	"Enu Ninna Leeleyo"	Sri Shankarananda Swamiji	Rajesh Krishnan, Ajay Warrior
7.	"Akaara Ukaara Makaara"	Amara Priya	Rajesh Krishnan
8.	"Sabh Sakhi Milkar"	Traditional	Basavaraj Bhantanuru
9.	"Neethi Lakshana Bhajiso"	Ghana Matada Shivayogi	Sharankumar Jalahalli
10.	"Iliyuvude Shiva"	Traditional	Basavaraj Bhantanuru
11.	"Morey Binath Arade"	Puttaraj Gawai	Basavaraj Bhantanuru
12.	"Kannolage Kanniddu"	Basavanna	Basavaraj Bhantanuru
13.	"Bana Bana Doondana"	Puttaraj Gawai	Basavaraj Bhantanuru
14.	"Vidhi Hoodida"	Umesh Puranik	Basavaraj Bhantanuru
15.	"Iru Thiruguva Vidhi"	Paramparika	Sharankumar Jalahalli
16.	"Shadja Rishaba"	Traditional	Chorus

== Awards ==
The film has won the following awards since its release.

2015-16 Karnataka State Film Awards

- Won – Karnataka State Film Award for Best Social film
- Won – Karnataka State Film Award for Best Actor – Vijay Raghavendra
