= H. G. Dattatreya =

Indian actor, theatre personality

Wing Commander H. G. Dattatreya
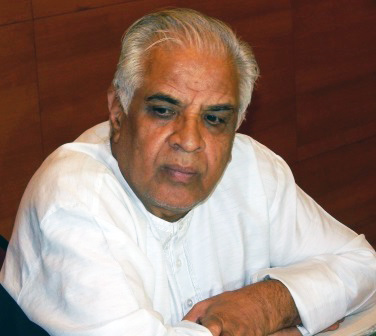
- Dattatreya in 2013

Personal details
- Born: Harihar Gundurao Dattatreya; 20 April 1942 (age 84) Chitradurga, Kingdom of Mysore
- Relatives: H. G. Somashekar Rao (brother)
- Education: UVCE, Bangalore; Air Force Technical College; Indian Institute of Science
- Occupation: Actor

Military service
- Allegiance: India
- Branch/service: Indian Air Force
- Years of service: 1965–1986
- Rank: Wing Commander

Harihar Gundurao Dattatreya (born 20 April 1942), popularly known as Dattanna, is an Indian actor who has appeared in more than 204 films and several plays. Alongside his career as an actor, he served in the Indian Air Force as an Aeronautical Engineer for over 20 years and also occupied academic positions with Hindustan Aeronautics Limited (HAL). He is best known for his work in Kannada cinema, in which he appears in mostly supporting roles. In a film career of almost three decades, he has won two National Film Award – Special Jury Awards, one National Film Award for Best Supporting Actor and two Karnataka State Film Awards. He is known for his performances in Munnudi (2000), Bettada Jeeva (2011) and Bharath Stores (2012). In 2022, he was awarded the Rajyotsava Prashasti by the Government of Karnataka.

== Early life and education ==
Dattatreya was born in 1942 in Chitradurga, in the erstwhile Kingdom of Mysore (now in Karnataka, India) to Harihar Gundurao and Venkamma. He has six siblings; brothers Venkatesh, who was a physicist at the Indian Institute of Technology Kharagpur; Suryanarayana Rao, is a professor of English in University of Mysore; and H. G. Somashekar Rao, a writer and an occasional actor. Dattatreya completed his education in Chitradurga. He secured the first rank in his matriculation exams in 1958, and second rank on completion of his pre-university course in 1959. He graduated with a degree in electrical engineering from University of Visvesvaraya College of Engineering (UVCE), Bangalore, in 1964. In 1978, he obtained a master's degree in electrical communication engineering from Indian Institute of Science (IISc), Bengaluru.

== Career ==
=== In Indian Air Force ===
After graduating in 1964, Dattatreya joined the Indian Air Force, as a Commissioned Officer in its technical branch. He subsequently trained at Air Force Technical College, Bangalore, and while studying his post graduation at IISc, Bangalore, he received a certificate on completion of a project on Management and Advance Technologies, in 1984. He served the IAF for over 20 years, before retiring as a Wing Commander. Upon retirement, he served in the Management Academy of Hindustan Aeronautics Limited (HAL), the Staff Training College, as its Deputy General Manager and Principal.

=== As actor ===
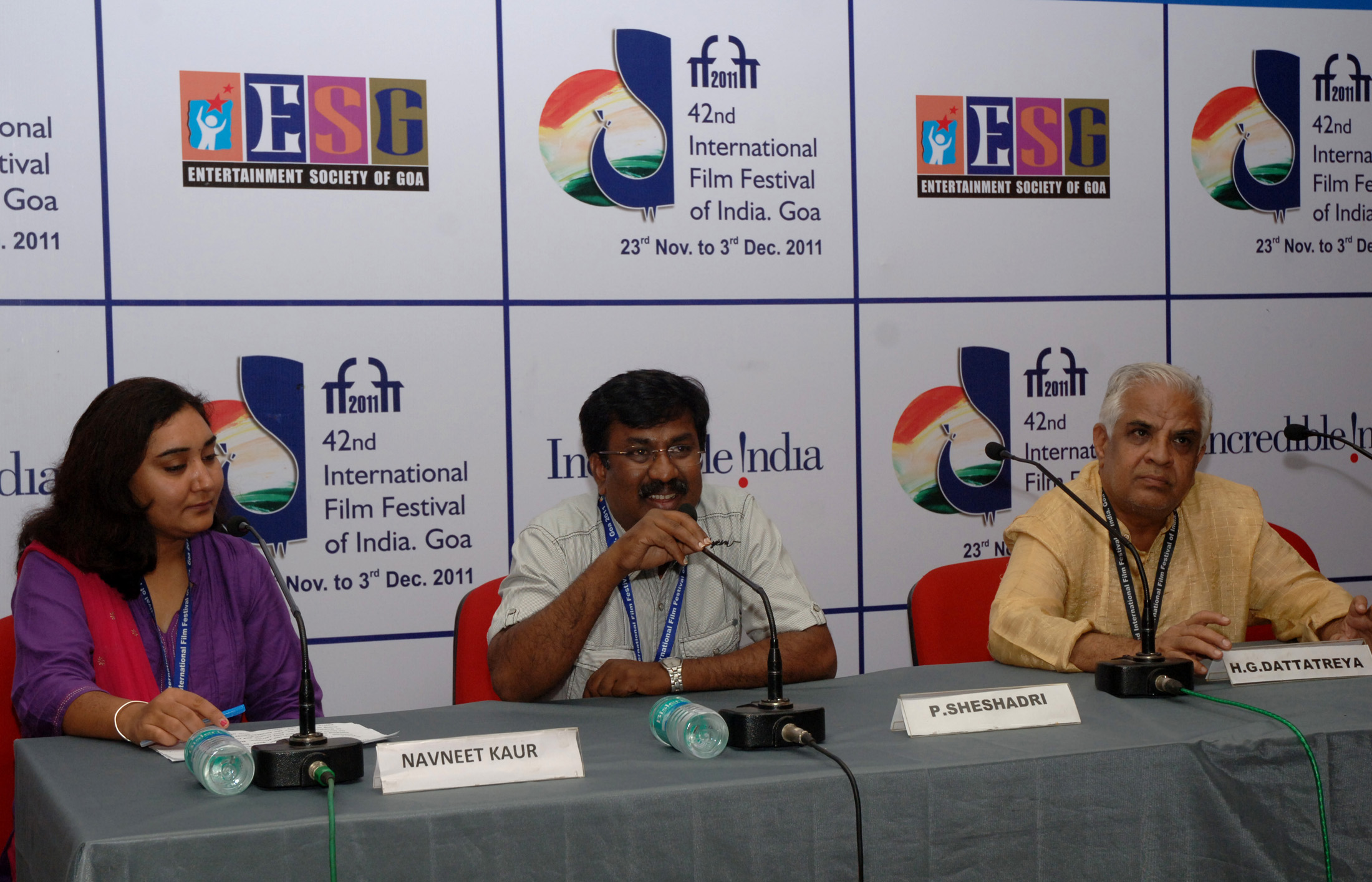
P. Sheshadri (middle) and Dattatreya (right) addressing a press conference during the 42nd International Film Festival of India, in Panaji, Goa

Dattatreya began acting in plays in the late 1950s and early 1960s, and while studying engineering in college at UVCE. His first appearance in a Kannada film came in T. S. Nagabharana's Aasphota (1988), which earned him the Karnataka State Film Award for Best Supporting Actor. Since then, he went on to appear in several films that have won multiple awards such as Kraurya (1996) and Munnudi (2000). His performance in the latter film earned him the National Film Award for Best Supporting Actor and the Karnataka State Film Award for Best Actor.

Dattatreya's performances in Mouni (2003) won him a National Film Award – Special Jury Award at the 51st National Film Awards. In the 2012 released film Bharath Stores, his role as Govinda Shetty, a Grocery shop owner hit hard when the Union Government increases foreign direct investment in the retail sector, won widespread critical acclaim. He won his second National Special Jury Award at the 60th National Film Awards. He was also awarded the Best Actor at the International Film Festival in Fiji in 2013.

== Partial filmography ==
- Note: All films are in Kannada, unless otherwise noted.

Year	Title	Role	Notes
1988	Udbhav		Hindi film
1988	Aasphota		
1989	Madhuri		
1990	Santha Shishunala Sharifa	Imam Sab	
1992	Mysore Mallige		
1992	Harakeya Kuri	Danappa	
1993	Chinnari Mutha	Daada	
1994	Kotreshi Kanasu		
1995	Lady Police		
1996	Kraurya		
1997	Ganga Yamuna		
1997	Ulta Palta	Police inspector	
1997	America! America!!	Srinivas	
1998	Andaman	Lieutenant Governor	
1998	Hoomale	Santosh's uncle	
1999	Maha Edabidangi		
1999	Chaithrada Chiguru		
1999	Prema Prema Prema		
2000	Thiladaanam	Subbayya	Telugu film
2000	Munnudi	Hasanabba	
2001	Mussanje	Seshanna	
2001	Chandana Chiguru		
2002	Atithi	Doctor	
2003	Don		
2003	Mouni		
2004	Yahoo	Haladi Nagappa's ghost	
2004	Dharma		
2004	Joke Falls	Raghavendra Joshi	
2005	Dr. B. R. Ambedkar		
2005	Beru	Venkateshaiah	
2005	Siddhu	Siddu's teacher	
2005	Rama Shama Bhama	Rangaswamy	
2006	Thutturi		
2006	Miss California		
2006	Uppi Dada M.B.B.S.		
2007	SMS 6260	Dattanna	
2007	Masanada Makkalu		
2007	Sathyavan Savithri		
2007	Kaada Beladingalu	Chandranna	
2007	Atheetham		
2008	Hani Hani		
2009	Anu		
2009	Maleyali Jotheyali	Col. Thammayya	
2009	Kurunadu		
2009	Daatu		
2010	Anishchitha		
2010	Cheluveye Ninne Nodalu	Gopala Gowda	
2011	Johny Mera Naam Preethi Mera Kaam	Priya's grandfather	
2011	Bettada Jeeva	Gopalaiah	
2011	Allide Nammane Illi Bande Summane		
2011	Paramathma	Appanna	
2012	Dashamukha		
2013	Bharath Stores	Govinda Shetty	
2014	December-1	Chief Minister	
2014	Matthe Satyagraha		
2014	Bahaddur		
2014	Baanaadi	Kishore's grandfather	
2014	Haggada Kone		
2015	Male Nilluvavarege		
2015	Endendigu		
2015	Vidaaya		
2016	Parapancha		
2016	Godhi Banna Sadharana Mykattu		
2016	Home Stay		
2016	Jigarthanda		
2016	Run Antony		
2016	Santheyalli Nintha Kabira		
2016	Happy Birthday		
2016	Neer Dose	Dattatreya	
2016	Doddmane Hudga		
2017	Srinivasa Kalyana		
2017	Jilebi		
2017	Prathima		
2017	Raajakumara	Mohammad Rafi	
2017	Tab		
2017	April Na Himabindu	Srikanta	
2017	Kempiruve	Venkatesh Murthy	
2017	Hombanna		
2018	Churikatte	Adi's grandfather	
2018	Kannadakkaagi Ondannu Otti		
2018	Double Engine		
2018	Loudspeaker		
2018	Amrutha Ghalige		
2018	Ajja		
2018	Ananthu vs Nusrath	Zulfikar Ali Khan	
2019	Mission Mangal	Ananth Iyengar	Hindi film
2019	Premier Padmini	Vinayak's neighbour	
2019	Sarvajanikarige Suvarnavakasha	Devraj	
2019	Brahmachari	Dr. Ramdev	
2020	Act 1978	Venkatachalaiah	
2021	SriKrishna@gmail.com		
2021	Rider	Principal	
2021	Nan Hesaru Kishora Yel Pass Yentu		
2022	Four Walls & Two Nighties	Mavayya	
2022	Selfie Mummy Googl Daddy		
2022	Totapuri: Chapter 1	Imaam Saheb	
2023	Raghavendra Stores	Gunda Bhat	
2023	Jersey Number 10		
2023	Totapuri: Chapter 2		
2023	Bad Manners		
2024	Yathabhava		
2024	My Hero		
2024	Murphy	Richard	
2026	Elra Kaaleliyatte Kaala		

=== Web series ===
- 2018 - Joshelay

== Awards and nominations ==
- 1987–88: Karnataka State Film Award for Best Supporting Actor: Aasphota
- 2000 : National Film Award for Best Supporting Actor: Munnudi
- 2000: Film Fans Association Award for Best Supporting Actor: Munnudi
- 2000–01: Karnataka State Film Award for Best Actor : Munnudi
- 2003 : National Film Award – Special Jury Award: Mouni
- 2011: Nominated : Filmfare Award for Best Supporting Actor – Kannada: Bettada Jeeva
- 2012 : National Film Award – Special Jury Award : Bharath Stores
- 2013: Best Actor Award at the Fiji International Film Festival for Bharath Stores
- 2016: Nominated, Filmfare Award for Best Supporting Actor – Kannada for Neer Dose
- 2016: Nominated, SIIMA Award for Best Actor in a Supporting Role – Kannada for Neer Dose
- 2016: Nominated, Filmfare Award for Best Supporting Actor – Kannada for Kempirve
- 2022: Rajyotsava Prashasti
