= Vimukthi (film) =

2010 Kannada language Indian drama film

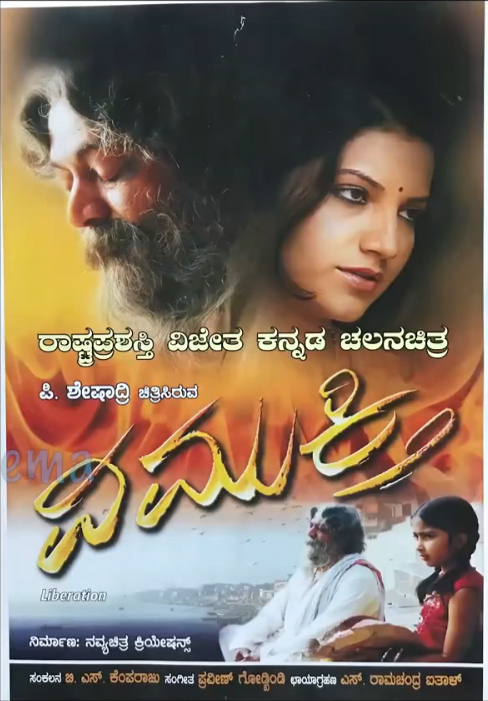
- Film poster
- Directed by: P. Sheshadri
- Screenplay by: P. Sheshadri
- Produced by: Navyachitra Creations
- Starring: Bhavana; Ramakrishna
- Cinematography: S. Ramachandra
- Edited by: B. S. Kemparaju
- Music by: Pravin Godkhindi
- Release date: 12 February 2010
- Running time: 102 minutes
- Country: India
- Language: Kannada

Vimukthi (transl. Salvation) is a 2010 Kannada language Indian drama film written and directed by P. Sheshadri. It is produced by Navyachitra Creations and stars Bhavana and Ramakrishna. The film deals with the Electra complex.

== Cast ==
- Bhavana as Madhavi
- Ramakrishna as Madhavi's father
- Houda as Nouvah

== Production ==
The film was shot in Varanasi.

== Release ==
Vimukthi was released theatrically on 12 February 2010.

== Reception ==
A critic from The New Indian Express wrote "Vimukthi is a well enacted film with Bhavana and Ramakrishna coming out with flying colours. Veteran artistes like Venkatarao and Eknath Agarkal really shine despite the limited opportunity. The camera work of S. Ramachandra is outstanding". B S Srivani from Deccan Herald wrote "With Sheshadri choosing to dwell more on Madhavi’s quest, the film’s touch-and-go approach tests viewer patience. The second half however redeems the film with the associated gnawing pain–a grim reminder of the director’s class!". A critic from Bangalore Mirror wrote "Praveen Godhkindi’s music and camera work by S Ramachandra Aithal are on par with Seshadri’s thoughts. Vimukthi documents incidents more than expressing thoughts and ideas. The film could have been more complex and thought provoking". A critic from News18 India wrote "Sheshadri's characterization is apt though the editing could have been a little sharper. The climax of the film is another highlight when the daughter searches for her own identity and decides to unite with her husband in the process of finding her father".

== Accolades ==
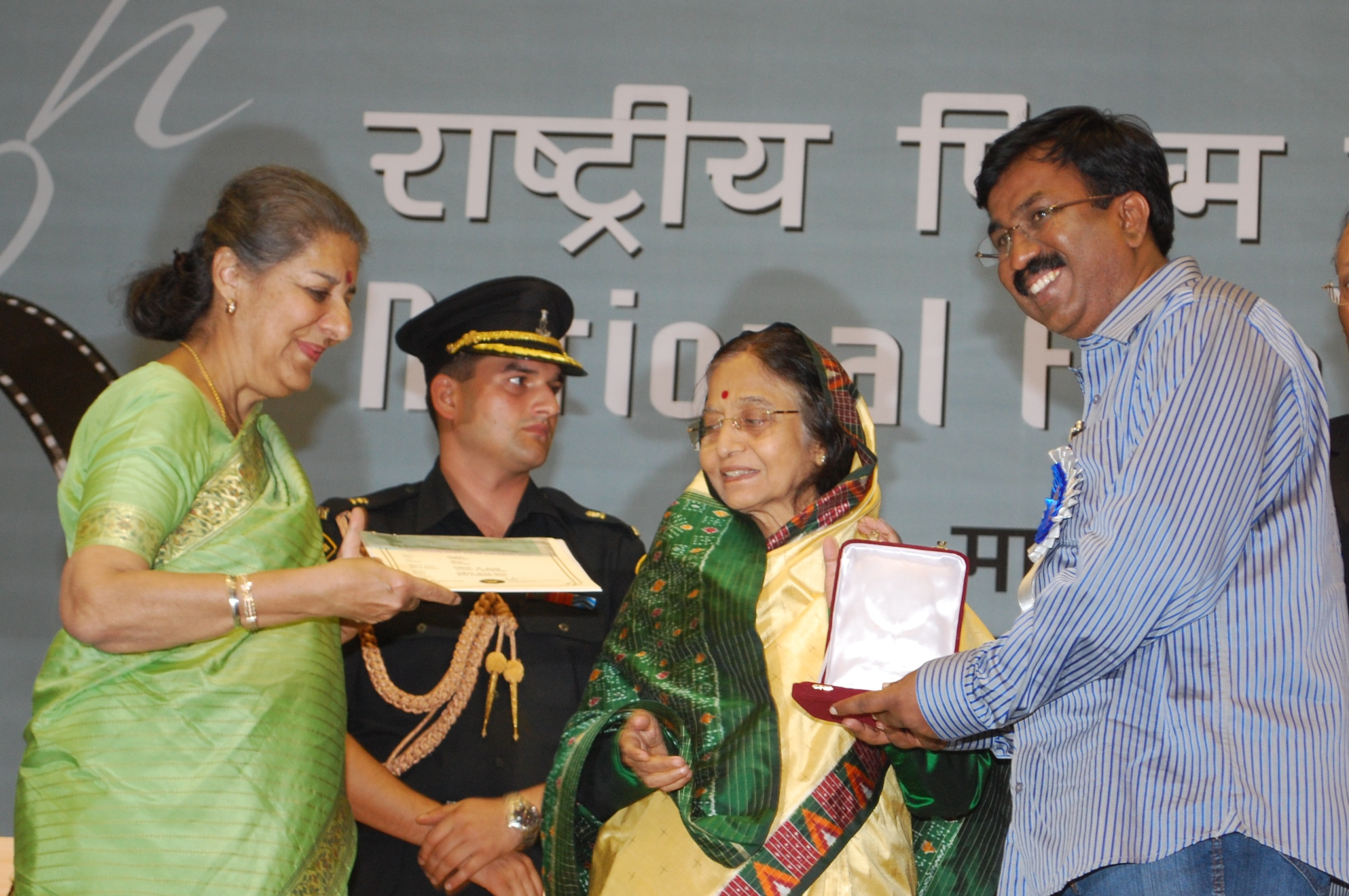
P. Sheshadri receiving the National Film Award for Best Feature Film in Kannada from President Pratibha Patil

Film trailer

Vimukthi was awarded the National Film Award for Best Feature Film in Kannada at the 56th National Film Awards.
