= Brahmashri Narayana Guru Swamy =

- Theatrical release poster
- Directed by: Rajashekar Kotian
- Written by: Mulky Chandrashekar Suvarna
- Produced by: Rajashekar Kotian
- Starring: Venkatadri; Vijaya Raghavendra; Rajeshekar Kotian; Balakrishna Shetty; Suryodhaya; Abhayachandra Jain, Jaya C suvarna Umanath Kotian; Chandrashekar Suvarna; Ashok Karnad; Chandrakanth, Sudheer Kotary; Ranjith; Gagan, Aravind Bolar; Bojaraj Vamanjoor; Boomika, Navya; Chitra Suvarna; Ashwini; Poornima
- Cinematography: P K H Das
- Edited by: Sanjeeva Reddy
- Music by: Pravin Godkhindi
- Release date: 2 May 2014
- Running time: 2h 40min
- Country: India
- Language: Tulu

Brahmashri Narayana Guru Swamy is a Tulu Language film directed and produced by Rajashekhar Kotian under the banner of Thungabadra Films. Venkatadri has played the lead role of Narayana Guru and Vijaya Raghavendra in a supporting role. The film was released on 2 May 2014 at five theaters across Udupi and Mangalore. The film won the Karnataka State Film Award for Special Film of Social Concern.

== Cast ==
- Venkatadri as Narayana Guru
- Vijay Raghavendra
- Rajshekar Kotian
- Balakrishna Shetty
- Suryodhaya
- Abhayachandra Jain
- Jaya C Suvarna
- Umanath Kotian
- Chandrashekar Suvarna
- Ashok Karnad
- Chandrakanth
- Sudheer Kotary
- Ranjith, Gagan
- Aravind Bolar
- Bojaraj Vamanjoor
- Boomika
- Navya
- Chitra Suvarna
- Ashwini
- Poornima
