= Atithi (2002 film) =

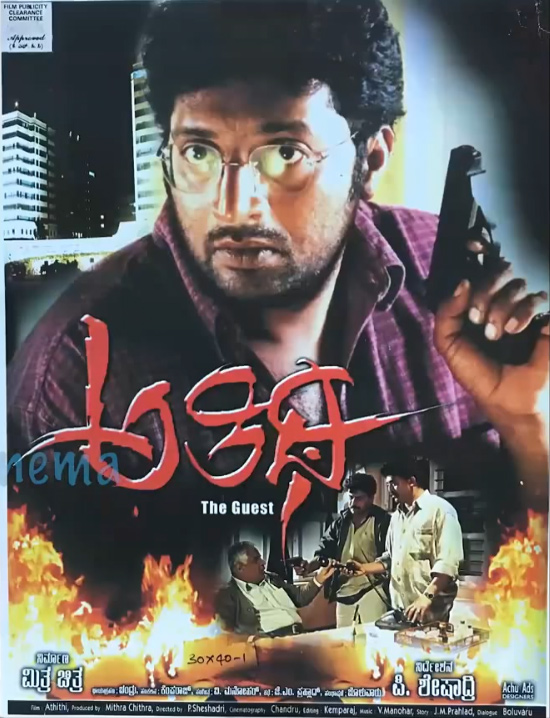
- Film poster
- Directed by: P. Sheshadri
- Screenplay by: P. Sheshadri; J. M. Prahlad
- Story by: J. M. Prahlad
- Produced by: Mithra Chithra
- Starring: Prakash Rai; Baby Raksha; H. G. Dattatreya; Lakshmi Chandrashekar
- Cinematography: Chandru
- Edited by: B. S. Kemparaju
- Music by: V. Manohar
- Release date: 9 August 2002
- Running time: 90 minutes
- Country: India
- Language: Kannada

Atithi (transl. The Guest) is a 2002 Indian Kannada language film directed by P. Sheshadri. The film deals with terrorism and the psychology of the terrorist. The 9/11 US tragedy and a car blast in Bangalore inspired the director Sheshadri to make a film about the psychology of terrorism.

== Plot ==
The film opens with a minister inaugurating a new flyover. The flyover is then bombed by a man (the Terrorist) along with his associates resulting in many deaths. The film moves to a village, where a well revered Doctor lives. He lives alone with his wife while his son lives in some other city. The Terrorist gets wounded while making a bomb. His associates are then forced to take him to the doctor's clinic where they kidnap his wife.

They threaten to kill her if the doctor calls the police or tells anyone. During the days the Terrorist is healing, there are many close calls. He meets and becomes friends with a girl named Putti, who regularly visits the Doctor. He and the Doctor have chats about his objectives.

He and his associates plan to bomb a dam being visited by the chief minister of the state. Some school children will also go there. He is forced to hurt Putti, who was also supposed to go there in order to save her.

The Doctor confronts him and tries to persuade him not to do this task. However, the Terrorist does not listen. On the day of the bombing, the Terrorist return the Doctor's wife and head to the dam. The Doctor tries one last time to stop the Terrorist by threatening to shoot him. However, the Terrorist calls his bluff.

While heading to the dam, the terrorists run into some school children, when the Terrorist imagines seeing Putti. He asks his associates to go down another road as he wants to think.

The film then ends, not revealing whether the terrorists carried out their attack or not.

Film trailer

== Cast ==
- Prakash Rai as Unnamed Terrorist
- H. G. Dattatreya as Doctor
- Lakshmi Chandrashekar as Doctor's Wife
- Baby Raksha as Putti
- C. R. Shashikumar as Police Inspector
- Dinesh Mangaluru as Terrorist
- Ramesh Pandit as Terrorist
- Kalpana Naganath as Putti's Mother

== Production ==
Prakash Rai reportedly charged just one rupee to act in this film.

== Critical reception ==
The film was well received by the critics. Critics were particularly unequivocal in their praise of the approach to a complex subject such as terrorism. Though the film had terrorism as the theme, there was no throttling noise of blasts and guns.

== Awards and screening ==
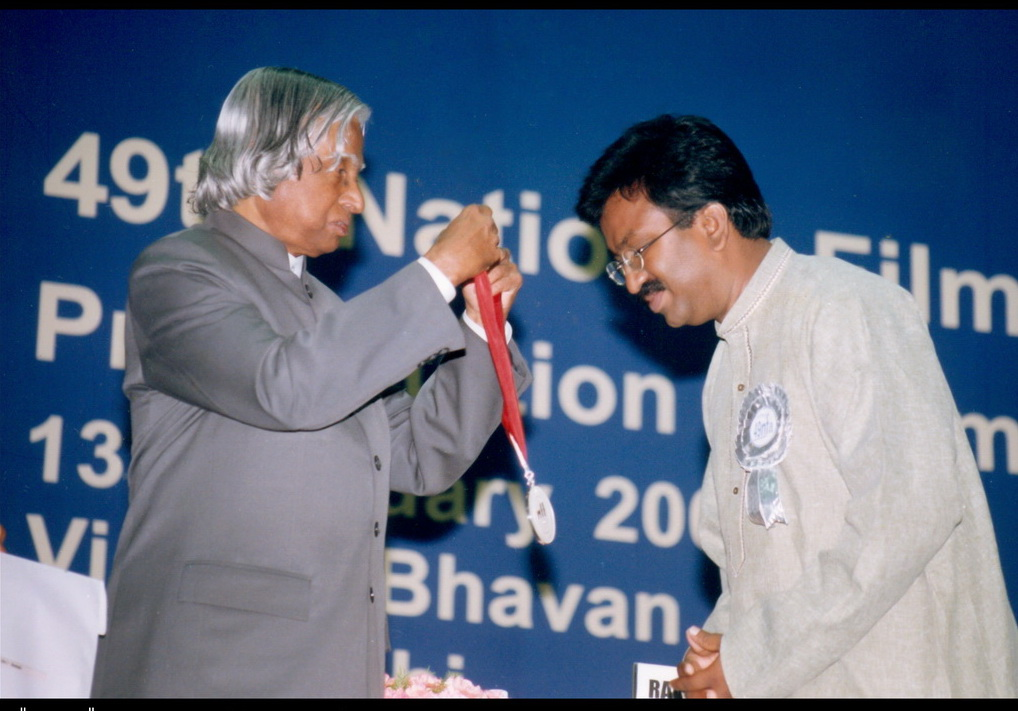
P. Sheshadri receiving the National Film Award for Best Feature Film in Kannada from President A. P. J. Abdul Kalam

- 2002 The film was selected for Indian Panorama in International Film Festival of India, Goa
- 2003 Screened at Cairo International Film Festival
- 2001: 49th National Film Awards: Best Film in Kannada
- Six Karnataka State Awards, entry in International Film Festivals of India, Kerala, Mumbai, Flanders (Belgium), Palm Springs (USA),
