= Hosa Neeru =

- DVD cover
- Directed by: K. V. Jayaram
- Screenplay by: K. V. Raju; K. V. Jayaram
- Story by: K. V. Raju
- Produced by: K. S. Sacchidananda
- Starring: Anant Nag; Suhasini; Lokanath
- Cinematography: B. S. Basavaraj
- Edited by: S. Manohar
- Music by: G. K. Venkatesh
- Production company: Panchama Movie Makers
- Release date: 3 January 1986
- Running time: 144 minutes
- Country: India
- Language: Kannada

Hosa Neeru is a 1986 Kannada-language film, directed by K. V. Jayaram and written by K. V. Raju. The film stars Anant Nag and Suhasini. It is considered one of the best movies by the Anant Nag and K. V. Jayaram duo. It is also the first movie for Suhasini with Anant Nag.

After marriage, a woman who is an engineering graduate decides to take up a job. However, she faces strong opposition from her father-in-law who does not want her to work.

The film score and soundtrack were composed by G. K. Venkatesh. The film was critically acclaimed and won multiple awards at the Karnataka State Film Awards for the year 1985–86.

== Cast ==
- Anant Nag as Krishnaprasad
- Suhasini as Bhavana
- Loknath as Krishnaprasad's father
- Lohithashwa as Principal
- Pandari Bai as Bhavana's mother
- Shashikala as Krishnaprasad's Mother
- Jaggesh
- Dingri Nagaraj
- Chethan Ramarao
- Thimmaiah

== Soundtrack ==
The music was composed by G. K. Venkatesh, with lyrics by R. N. Jayagopal.

Track listing
No.	Title	Singer(s)	Length
1.	"Neene Nanna Preethi"	S. P. Balasubrahmanyam
2.	"Neene Indu Prema Veene"	S. P. Balasubrahmanyam, S. Janaki
3.	"Koreva Chaliyali"	S. P. Balasubrahmanyam, S. Janaki
4.	"Olavu Thanda Besuge"	S. P. Balasubrahmanyam, S. Janaki
5.	"Naavella Ondagi"	S. P. Balasubrahmanyam, S. Janaki

== Awards ==
1985–86 Karnataka State Film Awards

- First Best Film
- Best Actor — Anant Nag
- Best Supporting Actress — Shashikala
- Best Music director — G. K. Venkatesh

Filmfare Awards South

- Best Director – Kannada — K. V. Jayaram
