= Thoovalkattu =

- Directed by: Venu B Nair
- Written by: T. M. Siddique
- Produced by: Ashok Kumar
- Starring: Manoj K. Jayan; Lakshmi Gopalaswami; Jagadish; Indrans; Sai Kumar
- Cinematography: M. J. Radhakrishnan
- Edited by: P. C. Mohanan
- Music by: Kaithapram Vishwanath
- Distributed by: R. K. Films
- Release date: 20 June 2010
- Country: India
- Language: Malayalam

Thoovalkattu is a 2010 Malayalam film directed by Venu B Nair starring Manoj K. Jayan and Lakshmi Gopalaswami in the lead roles.

== Plot ==
Sundaran, is the lead character in this movie. Contrary to his name, he is quite an unattractive person. Still he has managed to win the heart of Devu. Hajiyar, another character in the movie is less of an employee and more of an elder brother to Sundaran. Hajiyar's daughter happens to confront a few terrorists who blow up a mansion in the village.

== Cast ==
- Manoj K. Jayan as N.K Sundaran
- Lakshmi Gopalaswami as Devu
- Jagadish as Vanduran
- Anu Anad as Devan
- Indrans
- Sai Kumar as Hajiyar
- Bindu Panicker as Sarabi
- Sukumari
