= Pravin Godkhindi =

Indian classical bansuri player (born 1973)

Pandit. Dr. Pravin Godkhindi
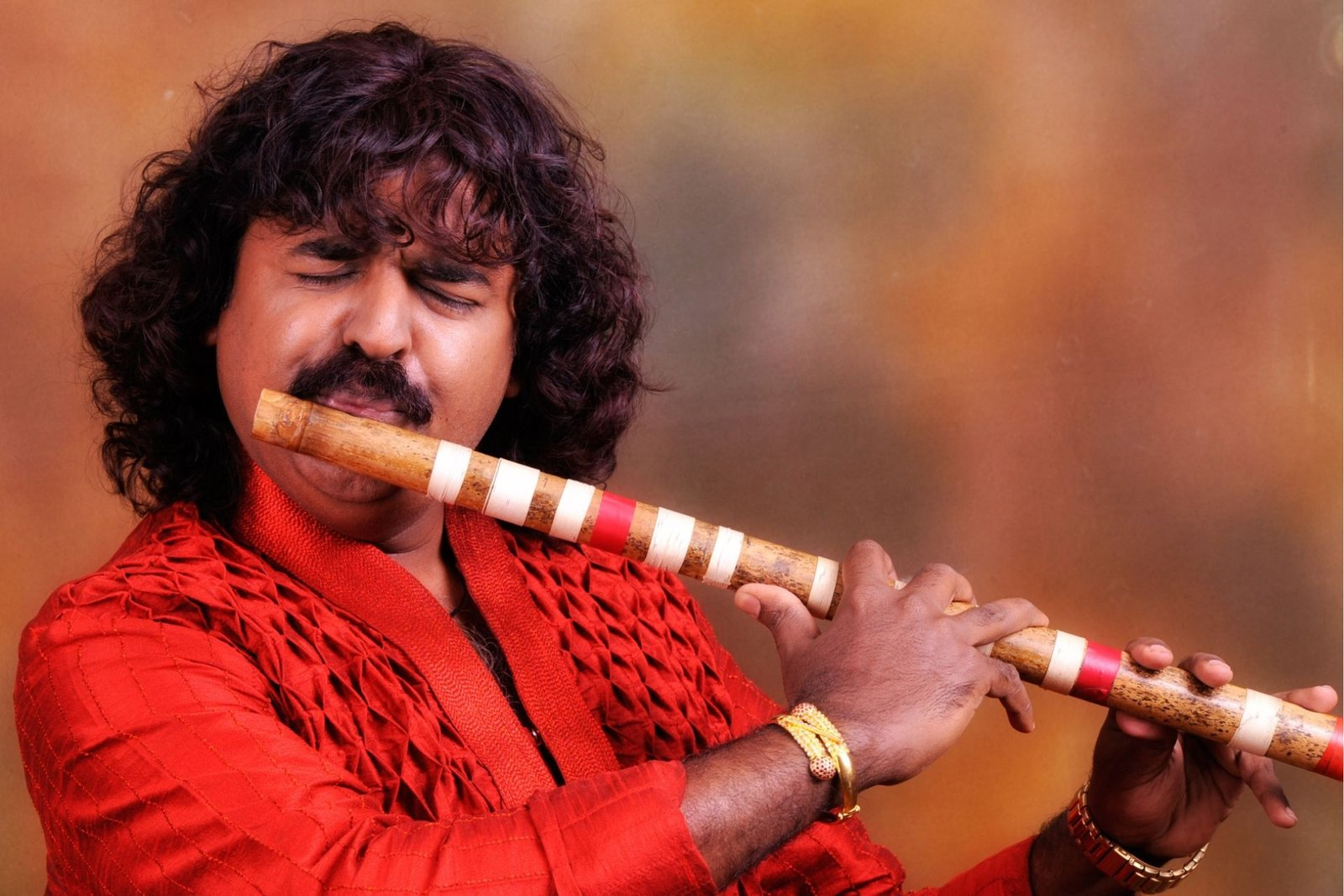
- Indian classical bansuri player

Background information
- Born: Pravin Godkhindi; 28 October 1973 (age 53)
- Origin: Dharwad, Karnataka, India
- Genres: Hindustani classical, fusion, world music
- Occupations: Flautist, composer, director, author
- Years active: 1979–present
- Website: pravingodkhindi.com

Pravin Godkhindi (born 28 October 1973) is an Indian classical bansuri player. In 2013, he became the first South Indian Hindustani bansuri artist to be recognized by All India Radio as an "A Top" ranking artist. He incorporates both the tantrakari (instrumental) and gayaki (vocal) styles into his performances.

== Early life and education ==
Born in Dharwad, Karnataka, Godkhindi began training at age three under his father, Pandit Venkatesh Godkhindi. He later studied rhythm under Vidwan Anoor Anantha Krishna Sharma. He graduated with distinction in Electrical and Electronics Engineering from SDM College of Engineering and Technology. In 2022, he was conferred an honorary doctorate by Tumkur University.

== Career ==
Pravin Godkhindi is known for performing on an eight-foot-long contrabass flute, which he named the "Gods Bansi". He is the first Indian to perform on the 8-foot contrabass flute. He is the first Indian bansuri player to incorporate the circular breathing technique into classical music performances. He has designed three unique custom flute variations: the Mandra Bansuri (an Alto U-shaped bansuri designed to achieve the lower octave Pancham note), the Flutar (a combination instrument merging the flute and electric guitar), and the Divya Bansuri (an amplified, illuminated flute containing built-in microphones and LED indicators).

In 1998, he established the fusion band "KRISHNA," a musical ensemble blending Hindustani classical, Carnatic, and Western musical elements.

He has collaborated with musicians including Ustad Zakir Hussain, M. Balamuralikrishna, and Vishwa Mohan Bhatt. As a composer, he co-produced and scored the soundtracks for the National Award-winning Kannada films Beru (2005) and Vimukthi (2010). He has composed original scores and title tracks for over 15 feature films and 40 television serials, alongside various devotional and dance drama recordings.

In 2022, he published his first novel, Prahara: Haduva Gadiyara, which he later translated into English as Prahar: The Singing Clock (2023).

== Awards and recognition ==
- Grammy Awards (2026): Earned a nomination in the Best Global Music Album category at the 68th Annual Grammy Awards (held February 1, 2026) for his musical contributions to the collaborative spiritual album Sounds of Kumbha, presented by singer and composer Siddhant Bhatia.
- National Film Awards: Received national recognition from the President of India as the co-producer and music composer for the Kannada feature films Beru and Vimukti.
- Krishna Hangal National Award (2026): Honoured for significant contributions to Hindustani classical music.
- Chowdiah Award (2017): Awarded by the Academy of Music, Bengaluru.
- ZMR Award, USA (2015): Won for Best Contemporary Instrumental Album for the collaborative tracking album Imaginings.
- Kempegowda Award (2011): Bestowed by the Bruhat Bengaluru Mahanagara Palike (BBMP).
- Titles: Surmani (awarded at age 16 by Sur Singaar Samsad, Mumbai), Venugaana Praveena, Singara Kala Ratna (conferred by the Singapore Kannada Sangha), Naada-Nidhi, and Aasthana Sangeet Vidwan from the Udupi Sri Krishna Mutt, Sringeri Sharada Peetham, and Aavani Sringeri Mutt.
