= Bharath Stores =

- Film poster
- Directed by: P. Sheshadri
- Screenplay by: P. Sheshadri
- Story by: P. Sheshadri
- Produced by: Basantkumar Patil
- Starring: Sudharani; Chi. Guru Dutt; H. G. Dattatreya
- Cinematography: Mahendra Simha
- Edited by: B. S. Kemparaju
- Music by: V. Manohar
- Production company: Basanth Productions
- Release date: 5 April 2013
- Running time: 98 minutes
- Country: India
- Language: Kannada

Bharath Stores (Kannada: ಭಾರತ್ ಸ್ಟೋರ್ಸ್) is a 2013 Indian Kannada-language film directed by P. Sheshadri, starring Sudharani, H. G. Dattatreya, Chi Guru Dutt, V. Manohar and others. The film deals with issue of Foreign direct investment (FDI) in Indian retail industry, and the impact of introduction of multi brand retail outlets on small retailers.

== Plot ==
Bharathi came to Bengaluru after nine years with her husband, Sharath, to fulfill her father's deathbed wish to repay his dues to Mr Govinda Shetty. Mr Govinda Shetty inherited the small grocery shop, "Bharath Stores" and was proudly carrying on the family business.

When searching for Shetty, Bharathi meets Chandru and Manjunath, who had worked in that shop. Chandru tells her how he learnt along with the tricks of the trade, to be humane from him. Manjunath tells her, he stayed in the shop till the end until Shetty was hospitalized. He brings her to the old age home. Bharathi finds Shetty there gazing at nothing, having stopped speaking for months and unable to react to her.

Globalisation, liberalisation and industrialisation brought the countries nearer. It is a couple of decades India also accepted these, resulting in the gradual change in the lifestyle. Malls and marts popped up. New ethics and style of business were adapted. Curious clientele gradually were being attracted to the mall culture. Repercussion was the deteriorating retail, small and box shops. Govinda Shetty too was a victim of the tsunami of this dangerous evolution. It is the status of lakhs and lakhs of those like him.

== Cast ==
- Sudharani as Bharathi
- Chi. Guru Dutt as Sharath
- H. G. Dattatreya as Govinda Shetty

== Reception ==
=== Critical response ===
Srikanth Srinivasa of Rediff.com scored the film at 3 out of 5 stars and wrote "It’s a uni-dimensional story and just scratches the surface of the problem though it is a sincere effort in focusing on a topical subject". A critic from The Times of India scored the film at 4 out of 5 stars and says "The climax is deeply touching. Sudharani has done a splendid job as the lead character. Chi Gurudutt is equally good. But it is Dattatreya who brings a tear or two in the climax with his brilliant performance. Cinematography by Mahendra Simha is good". A critic from Bangalore Mirror scored the film at 3 out of 5 stars and says "Dattatreya has done justice to his role and rightly deserves the special mention at the National Awards. This is the third time he gets a special mention. His brilliant performance is the soul of the film".

== Awards ==
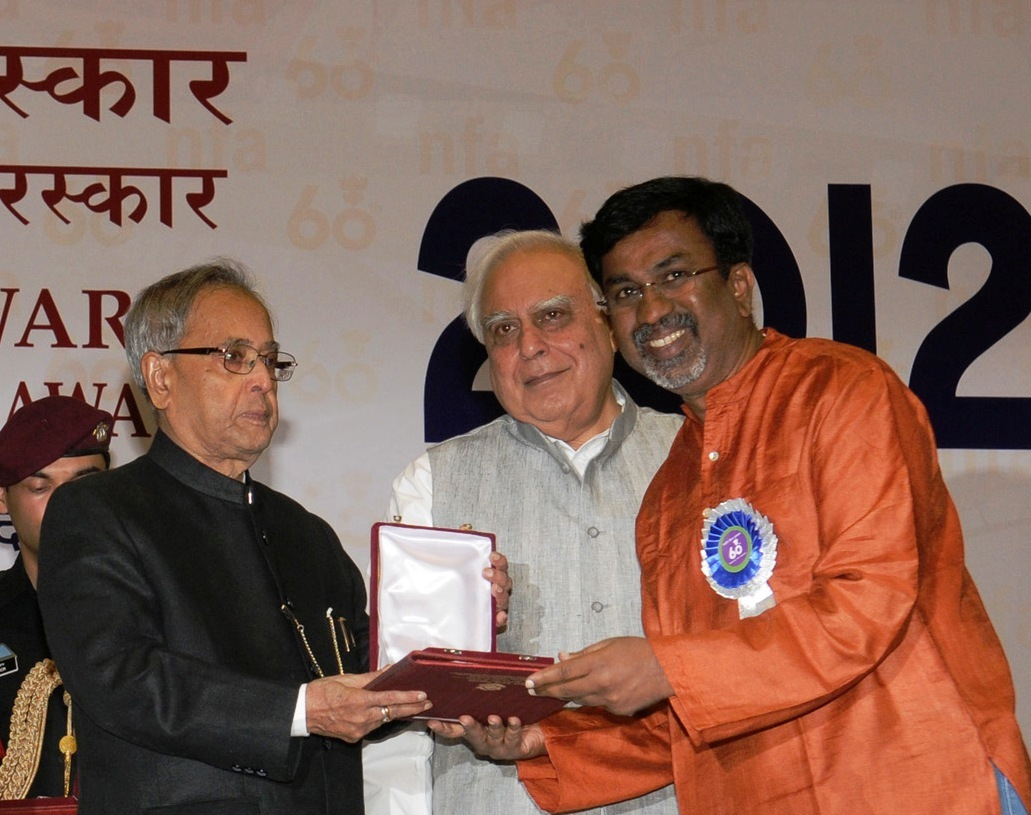
P. Sheshadri receiving the National Film Award for Best Feature Film in Kannada from President Pranab Mukherjee

- 2012: 60th National Film Awards: Best Feature Film in Kannada
- 2012-13: Karnataka State Film Award for Second Best Film
