= Karnataka State Film Award for Special Film of Social Concern =

Indian film award

Karnataka State Film Award for Best Social Film
- State award for contributions to Kannada cinema
- Awarded for: Best Film about Social Concern
- Sponsored by: Government of Karnataka
- Rewards: Silver Medal; ₹75,000
- First award: 1993-94
- Final award: 2020
- Most recent winner: Giliyu Panjaradollilla; E-Mannu

Highlights
- Total awarded: 55
- First winner: Karimaleya Kaggatthalu

== Winners ==
The following is the list of films winning the Karnataka State Best Social Film award.

Year	Film	Producer	Director	Refs.
2020	• Giliyu Panjaradollilla • E-Mannu	• Eshwaridas Shetty • Rajeshwari Rai	• P. R. Ramadas Naidu • Shivadhwaj Shetty	
2019	Kanneri	• Hebbar • Madhavi Hebbar • Chandrashekar	Manjunath S	
2018	Santakavi Kanakadasara Ramadhanya	Sreelakshmi Narasimha Movies	T.N. Nagesh	
2017	Hebbet Ramakka	S. A. Puttaraju	N. R. Nanjunde Gowda	
2016	Mudla Seemeyalli		K. Shivarudraiah	
2015	Shivayogi Sri Puttayyajja	Shyam Mukund Navale	Hamsa Vijeth	
2014	Brahmashri Narayana Guru Swamy (Tulu Film)		Shekhar Kotiyan	
2013	Ingale Marga	Ghanshyam Bhandge	Vishal Raj	
2012	Karanika Shishu		C. Lakshman	
2011	Sarasammana Samaadhi	Basant Kumar Patil	K. N. T. Sastry	
2010-11	Byari	T. K. Altaf Hussain	Suveeran	
2009-10	Shabari	Ramesh Yadav	Baraguru Ramachandrappa	
2008-09	Mukhaputa	• Narayana Hosmane • Subraya Hosmane • Roopa Iyer	Roopa Iyer	
2007-08	Banada Neralu	V. Chandrakanth	Umashankar Swamy	
2006-07	Kaada Beladingalu	• K. M. Veeresh • K. N. Siddalingayya • B. S. Lingadevaru	B. S. Lingadevaru	
2005-06	Thaayi	Prameela Joshai	Baraguru Ramachandrappa	
2004-05	Haseena	Chiguru Chitra	Girish Kasaravalli	
2003-04	Pravaaha	• Beerappa • P. R. Ramadas Naidu	P. R. Ramadas Naidu	
2002-03	Sainika	Rajayogi Films	Mahesh Sukhadhare	
2001-02	Gandhada Gombe	• B. Shankar • M. D. Hasham	B. Srinivas	
2000-01	Munnudi	Navyachithra	P. Sheshadri	
1999-2000	Shabdavedhi	Parvathamma Rajkumar	S. Narayan	
1998-99	Bhoomi Thayiya Chochchala Maga	• Jai Jagadish • R. Dushyant Singh • Vijayalakshmi Singh	S. V. Rajendra Singh Babu	
1997-98	Bhoomi Geetha	R. Mahadeva Gowda	Kesari Haravu	
1997-98	Maaribale (Tulu Film)		Krishnappa Uppoor	
1996-97	Karadipura	Rajalakshmi Ramachandrappa	Baraguru Ramachandrappa	
1995-96	Urvashi	Lalithamma Lingannaiah	Amaradeva	
1994-95	Kotreshi Kanasu	G. Nandakumar	Nagathihalli Chandrashekar	
1993-94	Karimaleya Kaggatthalu	Ganapathi Prabhu	E. Chennagangappa	

== See also ==
- Karnataka State Film Awards
