= Hajj (film) =

- Directed by: Nikhil Manjoo
- Written by: Srilalithe
- Screenplay by: Srilalithe
- Produced by: Rajiv Kothari
- Starring: Nikhil Manjoo; Manasa Joshi; Geethamani
- Cinematography: Siddegowda
- Edited by: Aditya Kunigal
- Music by: Shashi
- Production company: Surya Entertainers
- Release date: 2013
- Country: India
- Language: Kannada

Hajj (Kannada: ಹಜ್) is a 2013 Indian Kannada language directed by and starring Nikhil Manjoo in the lead role, alongside Manasa Joshi and Geethamani who appear in pivotal roles.

At the 2013 Karnataka State Film Awards, the film won four awards – Best Film, Best Director, Best Actor (Nikhil Manjoo) and Best Story (Srilalithe). In December 2014, at the 7th Bengaluru International Film Festival, the film was awarded the Best Kannada Film.

== Cast ==
- Nikhil Manjoo as Altaf
- Manasa Joshi as Hazira
- Geethamani as Fatima
