= Lakshmi Gopalaswamy =

Indian actress, classical dancer

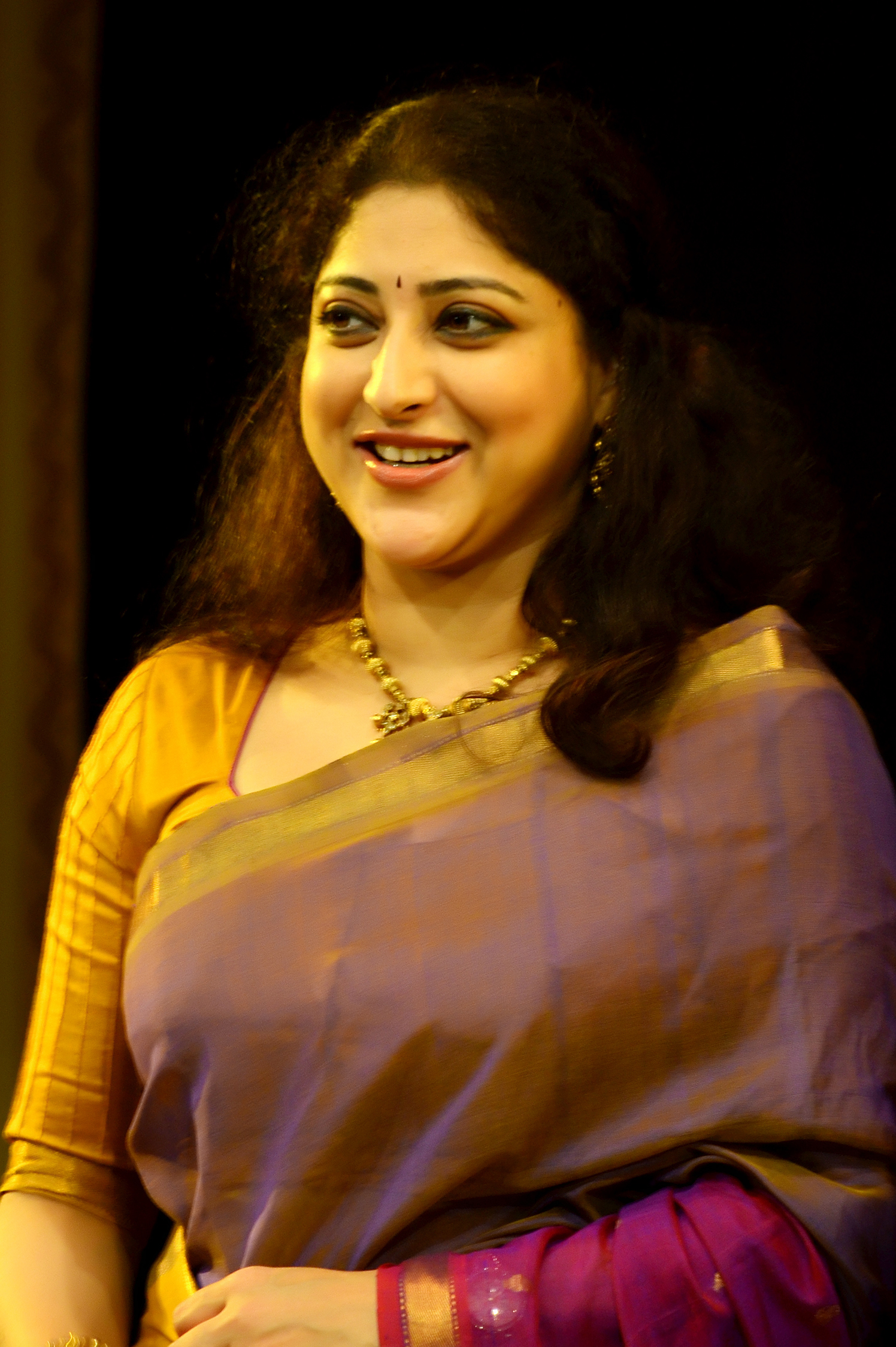
- Lakshmi Gopalaswamy in 2014
- Born: Lakshmi Gopalaswamy; Bengaluru, Karnataka, India
- Occupations: Actress; classical dancer; model
- Years active: 1998–present
- Parents: Gopalaswamy; Uma

Lakshmi Gopalaswamy is an Indian actress from Karnataka and a classical dancer, qualified in Bharatanatyam. She has mainly acted in Malayalam films, while also appearing in few Kannada and Tamil films.

She won the Karnataka State Film Award for Best Actress for her performance in her Kannada film Vidaya. Her debut Malayalam film Arayannangalude Veedu alongside Mammootty won her the Kerala State Film Award as the best supporting actor. She was a judge on Asianet's dance show Vodafone Thakadhimi..

== Early life ==
Lakshmi Gopalaswamy, was born in a Kannada family in Bangalore, Karnataka to M. K. Gopalaswamy and Dr. Uma Gopalaswamy. She has a younger brother, Arjun. Her mother is a scholar of music who prompted Lakshmi to learn and pursue a career in Bharatanatyam.

== Film career ==
She did her debut in the year 2000 with a Malayalam film Arayannangalude Veedu written and directed by Lohithadas alongside Mammootty which won her the Kerala State Film Award as the best supporting actress. In 2007, Lakshmi again received the Kerala State Film Award for the second best actress for her performances in Thaniye directed by debutant director Babu Thiruvalla and Paradesi directed by P. T. Kunju Mohammed. For the same films, she also received the "Atlas Film Critics Award" for the best woman actor.

In 2010, she secured a role in Aptharakshaka directed by P. Vasu, opposite South Indian star Vishnuvardhan. In this Kannada film, her performance as a dancer possessed by an evil spirit was praised by critics and the film-going public as well. The film went on to become a mega hit and ran for 35 continuous weeks in the theatres; and it was the last Kannada film of Vishnuvardhan. She also acted in Vishnuvardhan films like Vishnu Sena and Namyajamanru. Talking about the success of the film, Lakshmi in a recent interview said "I am satisfied with the kind of response I am getting from the audience for my performance in it. I had a desire to act with Vishnuji again and that is fulfilled with this movie."

She acted in the Tamil serial titled Lakshmi and has won much praise.

Her success in Malayalam cinema also got her offers from her native Kannada film industry, too. Her debut Malayalam film Arayannangalude Veedu got her the Kerala State Award for the best supporting actress. Her second film, Kochu Kochu Santhosangal, also brought in much acclaim for her acting. Acting afforded her a different kind of exposure. "Initially I was intimidated by the profession, I was too shy to be famous," but she soon felt at home.

== Dance ==
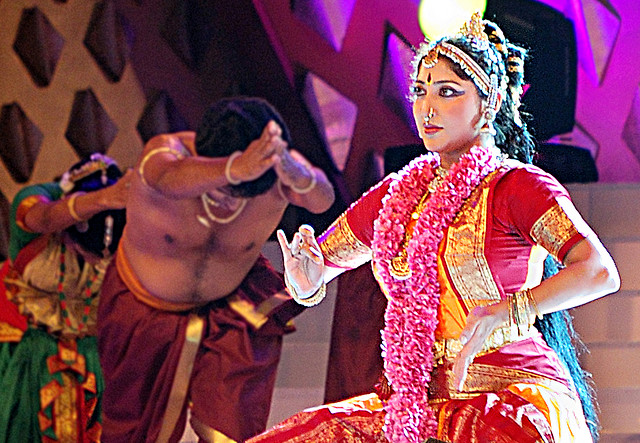
Lakshmi Gopalaswamy in 2009

Gopalaswamy claimed dance will always remain her favorite metier; she has also expressed love for playing certain roles in films, like those that integrate semi-classical dance tracks, such as Kochu Kochu Santhoshangal, in which two classical dance numbers became popular in Kerala. Her star status in the film world notwithstanding, she dreams of metamorphosing into a top-notch dancer.

== Awards ==
Kerala State Film Awards : Winner

- 2000:Kerala State Film Award for Second Best Actress – Arayannangalude Veedu
- 2007: Kerala State Film Award for Second Best Actress – Thainye

Karnataka State Film Awards : Winner

- 2014 : Karnataka State Film Award for Best Actress - Vidaaya

== Filmography ==
Key
†	Denotes films that have not yet been released

=== Malayalam films ===
Year	Title	Role	Notes
2000	Arayannangalude Veedu	Seetha	
2000	Kochu Kochu Santhoshangal	Asha Lakshmi	
2001	Achaneyanenikkishtam	Seetha	
2002	Punyam	Sukanya	
2004	Mampazhakkalam	Nirmala	
2004	Vamanapuram Bus Route	Meenakshi	
2004	Symphony	Sindhu	
2005	Boy Friennd	Nandini	
2006	Kanaka Simhasanam	Kanchanalakshmi	
2006	Smart City	Sarada	
2006	Keerthi Chakra	Sreekutty Mahadevan	
2007	Paradesi	Khadeeja	
2007	Paranju Theeratha Visheshangal	Vijayalakshmi	
2007	Thaniye	Home nurse	
2008	Bhagavan	Priya	
2008	Pakal Nakshatrangal	Padma	
2009	Bhramaram	Latha	
2009	Ividam Swargamanu	Maria	
2009	Black Dahliya	Dancer	
2010	Thathwamasi	Sreedevi	
2010	Thoovalkattu	Devu	
2010	Alexander the Great		
2010	Sahasram	Dr.Vrinda	
2010	Shikkar	Rukmini	
2011	Arabiyum Ottakavum P. Madhavan Nayarum in Oru Marubhoomikkatha	Khadeeja	
2011	Christian Brothers	Jessy	
2011	Kamal Perak	Stella	
2011	Veeraputhran	Sharada Balakrishnan	
2012	Naughty Professor	Karthika Viswambaran	
2012	916		
2012	Little Masters	Rajalakshmi	
2013	Oru Yathrayil	Meenakshi	Segment : I Love Appa
2013	Yathra Thudarunnu	--	
2013	Kadal Kadannu Oru Maathukutty	Herself	
2013	Ginger	Molykutty	
2013	Oru Indian Pranayakatha	Dr.Thulasi	
2014	Swapaanam	Kalyani	
2014	Mathai Kuzhappakkaranalla	Geetha	
2015	Ammakkoru Tharattu	Keerthana	
2017	Kambhoji	Uma Antharjanam	
2019	Jack & Daniel	Irine Jerald	
2019	Thakkol		
2022	Salute	Dr.Radhika Nambiar	
2023	Rajni	Dr. Fasli	
2025	Odum Kuthira Chaadum Kuthira	Malini	

=== Kannada films ===
Year	Film	Role	Notes
2004	Poorvapara	Vineetha	
2005	Vishnu Sena	Chitra	
2009	Nam Yajamanru	Urmila	
2010	Aptharakshaka	Saraswathi	
2015	Vidaaya	Meera	
2017	Allama	Allama Prabhu's mother	
2022	Raymo	Mahalakshmi	
2024	The Judgement	Bharghavi	

=== Tamil films ===
Year	Film	Role	Notes
2004	Kanavu Meippada Vendum	Hema	
2008	Bheemaa	Padma	
2022	Anantham	Saroja	web series
2017	Aruvi	Shobha Parthasarathy	
2023	Aval Peyar Rajni	Dr. Fasli	

=== Other language films ===
Year	Film	Role	Language	Notes
2015	Karbonn	--	Hindi	
2018	Aravinda Sametha Veera Raghava	Aravinda's Mother	Telugu	
2019	Sye Raa Narasimha Reddy	Seethamma	Telugu	

== Television ==
Year	Program	Role	Language	Channel	Notes
2006-2007	Lakshmi	Nethra	Tamil	Sun TV	TV Serial
2006	Swamy Ayyappan	Mohini	Malayalam	Asianet	TV Serial
2008	Vodafone Thaka Dhimi	Judge	Malayalam	Asianet	Reality show
2011	Sarigama	Participant	Malayalam	Asianet	Game show
2011	Golden Couple	Anchor	Malayalam	Jeevan TV	Game show
2011	Varnam	Dancer	Malayalam	ACV	
2013	Khayal	Dancer	Malayalam	MediaOne	
2014	Sree Venkateshwara Kalyana	Sridevi	Telugu	E TV	TV serial
2016	D 4 Dance Reloaded	Dancer	Malayalam	Mazhavil Manorama	Reality show
2017	Suvarnam Hariharam	Dancer	Malayalam	Mazhavil Manorama	
2018	Sthree Sakthi	Arakkal Beevi	Malayalam	Asianet News	
2018	Amma Mazhavillu	Dancer	Malayalam	Mazhavil Manorama	
2021–2022	Comedy Stars Season 3	Judge	Malayalam	Asianet	Reality show
2022	Red Carpet	Mentor	Malayalam	Amrita TV	
2022	Kaiyethum Doorath	Herself as Cameo Appearance	Malayalam	Zee Keralam	TV serial
2022	Flowers Oru Kodi	Participant	Malayalam	Flowers TV	
2023	Star Magic	Mentor	Malayalam	Flowers TV	
2023	Manimuthu	Herself as Cameo Appearance	Malayalam	Mazhavil Manorama	TV serial
2026-present	Dance Dhamaka	Judge	Malayalam	Flowers TV	

She has been presenting her dance performances on different stages worldwide. She has appeared in many commercials especially in Malayalam.

=== Albums ===
- Ormmayundo
