= Arabinofuranan 3-O-arabinosyltransferase =

Class of enzymes

Identifiers
- EC no.: 2.4.2.47

Databases
- IntEnz: IntEnz view
- BRENDA: BRENDA entry
- ExPASy: NiceZyme view
- KEGG: KEGG entry
- MetaCyc: metabolic pathway
- PRIAM: profile
- PDB structures: RCSB PDB PDBe PDBsum
Search
- PMC: articles
- PubMed: articles
- NCBI: proteins

Arabinofuranan 3-O-arabinosyltransferase (EC 2.4.2.47, AftC) is an enzyme with systematic name alpha-(1->5)-arabinofuranan:trans,octacis-decaprenylphospho-beta-D-arabinofuranose 3-O-alpha-D-arabinofuranosyltransferase. This enzyme catalyses the following chemical reaction:

Adds an alpha-D-arabinofuranosyl group from trans,octacis-decaprenylphospho-beta-D-arabinofuranose at the 3-O-position of an alpha-(1->5)-arabinofuranan chain attached to a beta-(1->5)-galactofuranan chain

This enzyme is isolated from Mycobacterium smegmatis.
