= December-1 =

- Film Poster
- Directed by: P. Sheshadri
- Written by: P. Sheshadri
- Produced by: Basantkumar Patil
- Starring: Nivedhitha; Santosh Uppina; H. G. Dattatreya
- Cinematography: Ashok V. Raman
- Edited by: B. S. Kemparaju
- Music by: V. Manohar
- Release date: 25 April 2014
- Running time: 98 minutes
- Country: India
- Language: Kannada

December-1 (Kannada: ಡಿಸೆಂಬರ್-1) is a 2014 Indian Kannada-language film written and directed by P. Sheshadri starring Niveditha, Santosh Uppina and H. G. Dattatreya.

The film won two National Film Awards at the 61st National Film Awards – Best Feature Film in Kannada and Best Screenplay (P. Sheshadri) At the 2013 Karnataka State Film Awards, Niveditha was awarded the Best Actress.

== Plot ==
Basupura is a tiny village where Madevappa works here in a flour mill, and his wife Devakka makes rotis and sells in nearby towns. A school-going son, a daughter still in cradle and Madevappa's aged mother are the others in the family. It is a hand-to-mouth existence; but they have got used to it, with their own small pleasures and distant dreams.

The whole village is getting geared up for the Chief Minister (CM)'s visit on 1 December. CM's officially scheduled overnight stay in Madevappa's house gives Madevappa’s family extra attention, earning them a better social standing as they look forward to the event.

CM's visit goes on well with a grand welcome, dinner with Madevappa, Photo Shoots, Press Meets, discussions with local leaders etc. Madevappa & family are overwhelmed by the proceedings, but hardly get to interact with the CM. Instead, they face embarrassing moments feeling as though they are outsiders in their own house.

Wide media coverage highlights CM's exhortations on the need for humanitarian approach in dealing with people suffering from serious health setbacks. Though well intended it creates difficulties to Madevappa and family driving them to despair.

== Cast ==
- Nivedhitha as Devakka
- Santosh Uppina as Madevappa
- H. G. Dattatreya as Chief Minister
- Shanthabai Joshi as Devakka's mother-in-law
- Shashikumar as District Commissioner
- Preeti Nagaraj as School Headmiss

== Reception ==
December-1 opened to positive response from critics upon its theatrical release. G. S. Kumar of The Times of India gave the film a rating of four out of five and wrote, "The script has elements of tension, suspense, sarcasm and humour. Kudos to Sheshadri for the excellent narration that keeps the film moving at a fast pace." and praised the roles of acting, cinematography, music and costume designing departments in the film. A. Sharadhaa of The New Indian Express wrote, "Crisp and witty dialogues, great performances, a pithy screenplay, edgy camerawork...nothing has gone wrong with the film, which is about a family of a struggling husband, an enterprising wife, their two children and a grandmother." and concluded writing, "Despite being an artistic film, December 1 has great potential to do well commercially." Shyam Prasad S. of the Bangalore Mirror wrote of the film, "... December 1 is an art film that has the best potential for commercial success among all such films in recent years. The director brings to life a telling presentation of a village family destroyed by a political gimmick." and concluded writing, "There is nothing legally wrong in what the CM and the media did in the film. But if the film sends the wrong message to the intended audience, it makes for a bad postscript for December 1."

== Awards ==
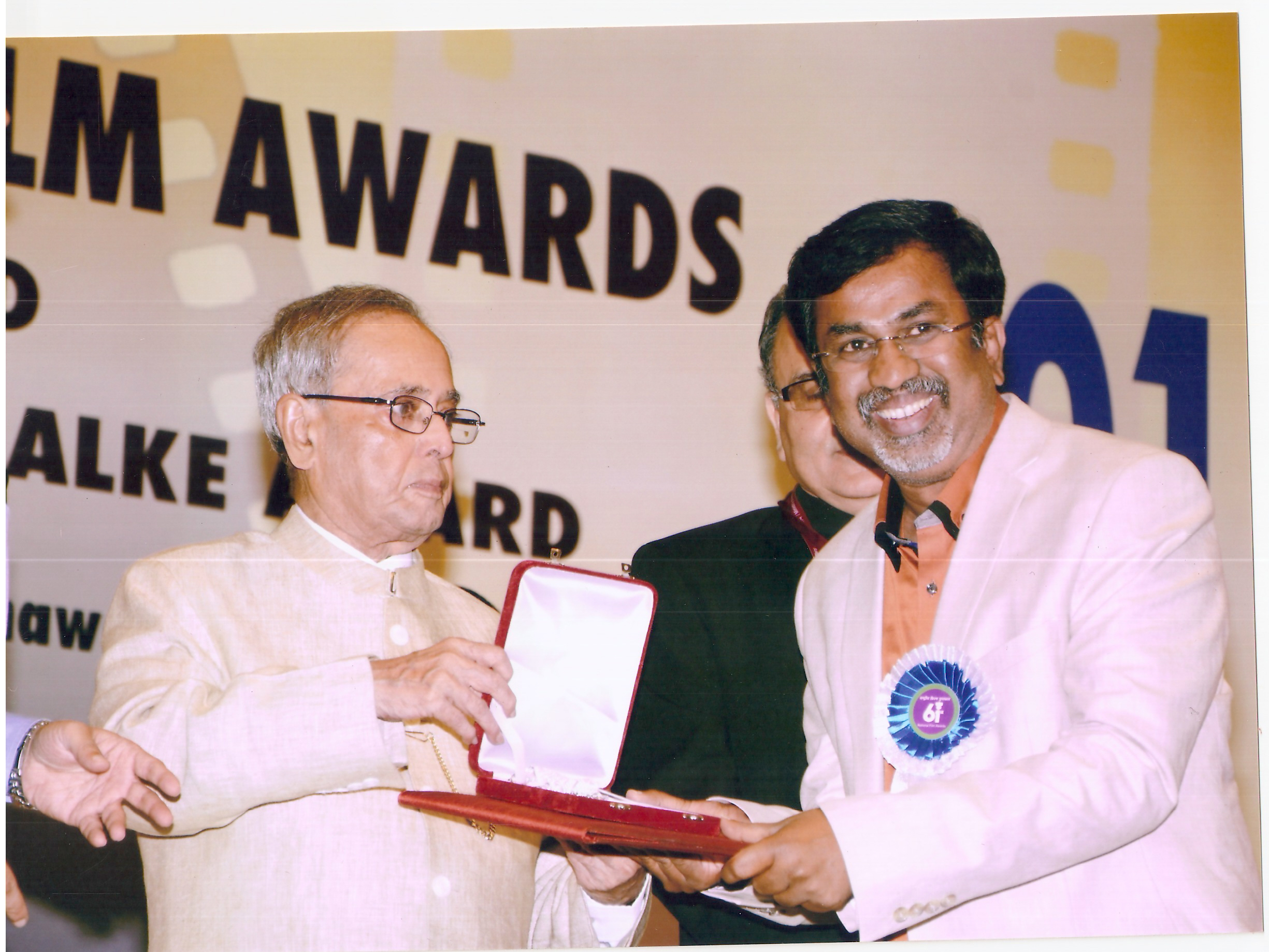
P. Sheshadri receiving the National Film Award for Best Feature Film in Kannada from President Pranab Mukherjee

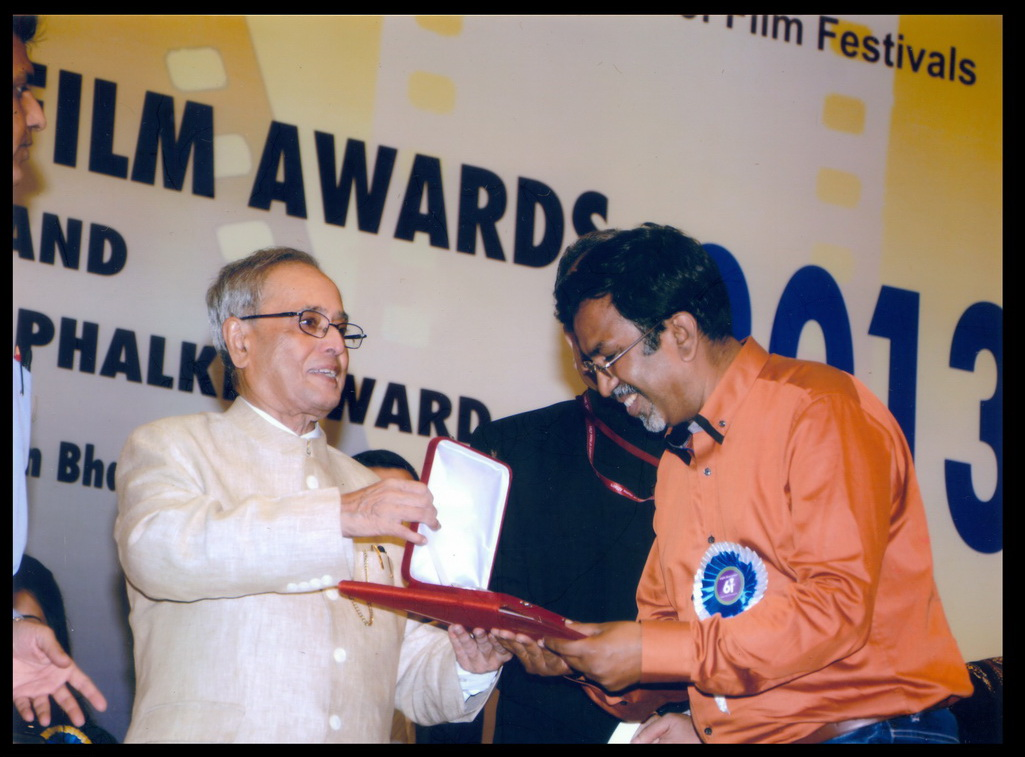
P. Sheshadri receiving the National Film Award for Best Screenplay from President Pranab Mukherjee

61st National Film Awards

- Best Screenplay (original) – P. Sheshadri
- Best Feature Film in Kannada – P. Sheshadri and Basantkumar Patil

Karnataka State Film Awards 2013

- Best Actress – Niveditha
