= Karnataka State Film Award for Best Actor =

Indian film award

- State award for contributions to Kannada cinema
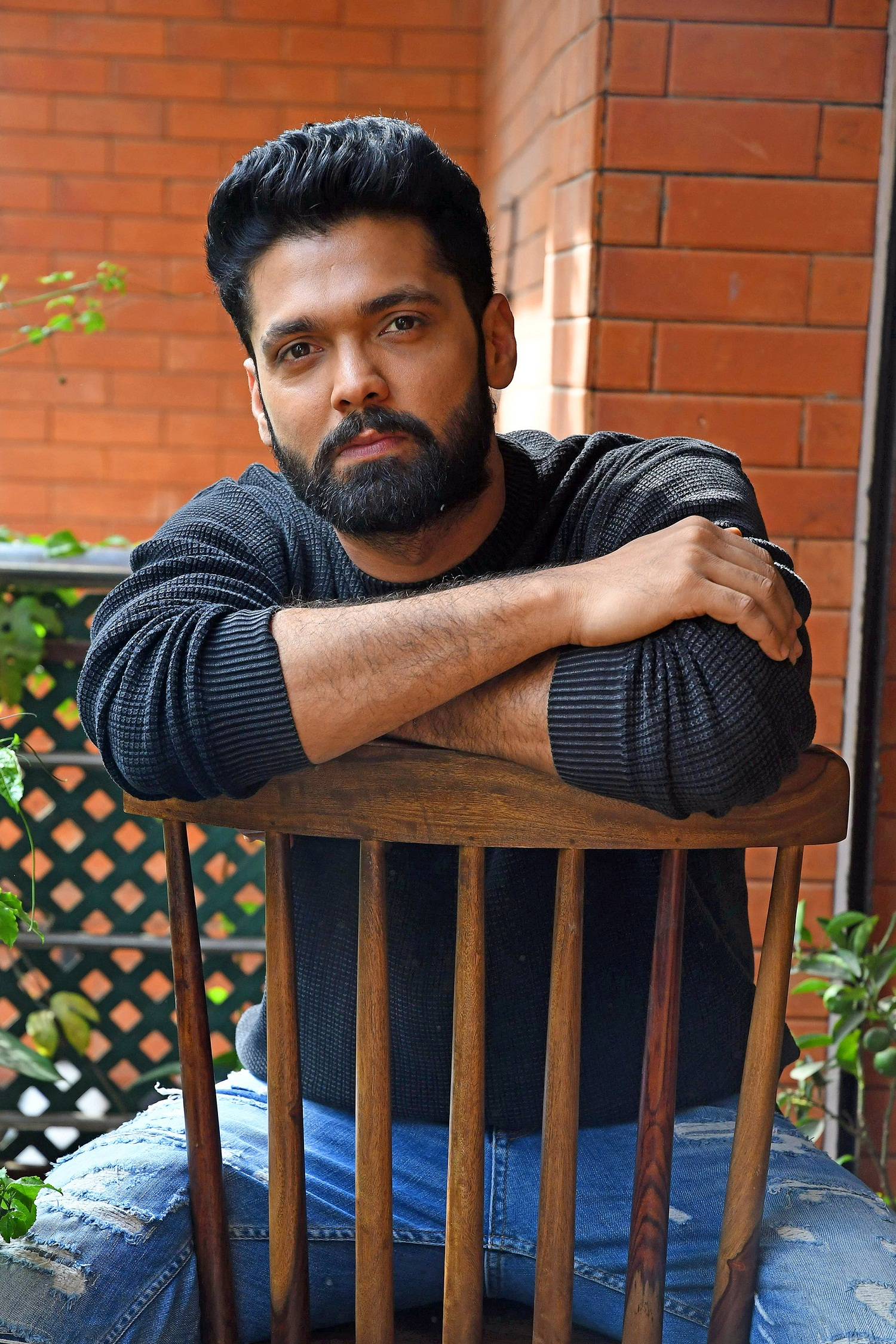
- Rakshit Shetty, the latest winner for 777 Charlie
- Awarded for: Best Actor of the Year
- Sponsored by: Government of Karnataka
- Rewards: Silver Medal; ₹ 20,000
- First award: 1967-68
- Final award: 2021
- Most recent winner: Rakshit Shetty

Highlights
- Total awarded: 55
- First winner: Rajkumar

Karnataka State Film Award for Best Actor is a film award of the Indian state of Karnataka given during the annual Karnataka State Film Awards. The award honours Kannada-language films.

== Recipients ==
The first recipient was Rajkumar who was honored in 1967 for his performance in Bangaarada Hoovu. As of 2019 he was the most honored actor with nine awards. Vishnuvardhan was honored in seven occasions. Two actors Anant Nag, Shiva Rajkumar have been honored four times, while Lokesh honored thrice and three actors Ramesh Aravind, Sudeepa and Puneeth Rajkumar have won twice. The award was tied in the year of 1998–99 between Vishnuvardhan and Ramesh Aravind. Shiva Rajkumar, Raghavendra Rajkumar and Puneeth Rajkumar are the only siblings to have bagged this award. The most recent recipient is Rakshit Shetty who is honored in 2021 for his performance in the film 777 Charlie.

The following is a complete list of award winners and the name of the films for which they won.

=== Key ===
Symbol	Meaning
†	Indicates a joint award for that year
/	Indicates one role with multiple names
‡	Indicates that the winner won the award for double roles

Year	Image	Recipient(s)	Role	Film	Ref(s)
1967-68		Rajkumar	Anand	Bangarada Hoovu	
1968-69		R. Nagendra Rao	Anantha Raya	Hannele Chiguridaga	
1969-70		B. R. Panthulu	Thimmarasu / Appaji	Sri Krishnadevaraya	
1970-71		Rajkumar	• Raja Raghunatha Rao • Ravi / Chandrashekharaiah • Shankar / Anand	Kula Gourava	
1971-72	–	Venkata Rao Thalageri	Shrinivasa Shrothri	Vamsha Vriksha	
1972-73		Vishnuvardhan	Ramachari	Naagarahaavu	
1973-74		Lokesh	Sambayya / Ayyu	Bhootayyana Maga Ayyu	
1974-75		Rajkumar	Gora Kumbhar	Bhakta Kumbara	
1975-76		M. V. Vasudeva Rao	Choma	Chomana Dudi	
1976-77 ‡		Rajkumar	• Arjuna • Babruvahana	Babruvahana	
1977-78		Vishnuvardhan	Dr. Nataraj	Hombisilu	
1978-79		Lokesh	Thimma	Parasangada Gendethimma	
1979-80		Anant Nag	Antony De'Souza	Minchina Ota	
1980-81		Srinath	Raghavendra	Shree Raghavendra Vaibhava	
1981-82		Rajkumar	Ravi	Hosa Belaku	
1982-83		Rajkumar	Ranga	Haalu Jenu	
1983-84		Lokesh	Malgudi Margayya	Banker Margayya	
1984-85		Vishnuvardhan	Dr. Harish	Bandhana	
1985-86		Anant Nag	Krishna Prasad	Hosa Neeru	
1986-87	–	Charuhasan	Tabara Shetty	Tabarana Kathe	
1987-88		Anant Nag	Krishnappa Gowda	Avasthe	
1988-89		Rajkumar	Krishna Murthy	Devatha Manushya	
1989-90	–	Sridhar	Shishunala Sharif	Santha Shishunala Sharifa	
1990-91 ‡		Vishnuvardhan	• Lion Jagapathi Rao • Kumar Raja	Lion Jagapathi Rao	
1991-92		Devaraj	Veerappan	Veerappan	
1992-93		Rajkumar	Vishwanath	Jeevana Chaitra	
1993-94		Rajkumar	Ramanna	Odahuttidavaru	
1994-95		Anant Nag	Raghappa	Gangavva Gangamaayi	
1995-96		Shiva Rajkumar	Sathya Murthy / Sathya	Om	
1996-97		Ramesh Aravind	Surya	America! America!!	
1997-98		Vishnuvardhan	Swaroop Krishna Kumar	Laali	
1998-99 †		Vishnuvardhan	Veerappa Nayaka	Veerappa Nayaka	
1998-99 †		Ramesh Aravind	Santosh	Hoomale	
1999-2000		Shiva Rajkumar	Ravi	Hrudaya Hrudaya	
2000-01		H. G. Dattatreya	Hasanabba	Munnudi	
2001-02 ‡		V. Ravichandran	• Raja • Ravi	Ekangi	
2002-03		Sudeepa	Nandi	Nandhi	
2003-04		Shiva Rajkumar	Shankar / Dattanna	Chigurida Kanasu	
2004-05		Sri Murali	Kanthi / Srikanta	Kanthi	
2005-06		Shiva Rajkumar	Madesha / Jogi	Jogi	
2006-07		Vijay	Shivalingu	Duniya	
2007-08		Puneeth Rajkumar	Akash	Milana	
2008-09	–	Yogesh	Dhananjaya / Dhanu	Ambari	
2009-10 ‡		Vishnuvardhan (posthumously)	• Dr. Vijay • Vijaya Rajendra Bahaddur	Aaptha Rakshaka	
2010-11		Puneeth Rajkumar	Jackie	Jackie	
2011		Arjun Sarja	Shankar	Prasad	
2012		Darshan	Sangolli Rayanna	Krantiveera Sangolli Rayanna	
2013	–	Nikhil Manjoo	Altaf	Hajj	
2014		Sanchari Vijay	Madesha (Vidya)	Naanu Avanalla...Avalu	
2015		Vijay Raghavendra	Puttaraj Gawai	Shivayogi Sri Puttayyajja	
2016		Achyuth Kumar	Shivappa	Amaravathi	
2017	–	Vishruth Naik	Bhyra	Manjari	
2018		Raghavendra Rajkumar	Rajeeva	Ammana Mane	
2019		Sudeepa	Pailwan Krishna	Pailwaan	
2020		Prajwal Devaraj	Bharath	Gentleman	
2021		Rakshit Shetty	Dharma	777 Charlie	

== See also ==
- Cinema of Karnataka
- List of Kannada-language films
