= Air Force Technical College, Bengaluru =

College in Bangalore, India

Coordinates: 13°3′6.04″N 77°31′16.42″E

Air Force Technical College, Bangalore
- Other name: AFTC
- Motto: Gyanen Shobhamahe
- Type: Military college
- Established: 4 July 1949
- Commandant: Air Commodore VN Rao
- Location: Bangalore, Karnataka, India
- Website: https://web.archive.org/web/20171227121134/http://indianairforce.nic.in/show_page.php?pg_id=81

Air Force Technical College is in Bangalore, India.

== History ==
Air Force Technical College (AFTC) was established on 4 July 1949, in collaboration with Air Service Training Co. (Hamble), U.K. with Gp.Capt. J Beaumont CBE, DFC, as the first Commandant. The college was then named as Technical Training College (TTC). The entire staff of the college were officers and technicians from the Royal Air Force (RAF). The first principal of the college was Gp.Capt. Vaghuan Phillips, who was succeeded by Gp. Capt. Thripps. Technical staff included Sir. William Houghton - the co-inventor of Radar, Mr. B.H.Middleton of Smiths Aircraft Instruments U.K., Mr. Holbon of Rolls-Royce and Mr. Sturggeon of de Havilland. Mr.Porter headed the Department of Basic Engineering Technology.

In the early 1950s, the Indian Air Force initiated the unique “Zero Course” — a cohort of engineering officers specially selected and trained as pilots to address immediate operational needs. Many of these officers went on to serve with distinction in wars and rose to senior leadership roles.

Technicians were trained for the IAF from 1949, after India became independent. The youths were aged between 15 and 17.5. The streams were divided into seven categories: airframes, aero engines, aircraft instruments, electricals, wireless, radar, and armaments, and allotted according to the individual's aptitude. The ab initio training was for a period of two years as aircraft apprentice followed by one-year practical training at the various air force flying and maintenance establishments in the country after which they returned to the college for advanced training in their disciplines for another year. However this was modified after the sixth entry of apprentices passed out and the later batches were trained for the entire four years at the A.F.T.C., after the completion of which they passed out as full aircraft technicians in Group I trades with a liability to render 15 years regular and 9 years reserve service. Some of them later qualified and rose to the position of Air Marshal in their respective branches of specialization or branched off to other flying arms like pilots, navigators, flight signalers, flight engineers, flight gunners. Many left the IAF to become engineers, technocrats and managers in civilian establishments. Some of them joined the Indian Army during the Indo-China war and rose to the rank of colonel in technical branches. The first apprentice who graduated from the college in 1951 carrying the service No. 400001 by name G.K. Pillay belonged to the Aero Engines group. Most of the graduates from AFTC during the course of employment in the IAF were trained in foreign countries like UK, US, Germany, France and Russia on specialised equipment and aircraft.

In commemoration of completion of 60 years since the passing-out of the I batch of technicians, an alumni association called "Afticans" was formed in 2011 led by G. Sivasankara Pillai (14th Rad.).Annual Reunions are held where the former Apprentices along with their family, who are now in the seventies and eighties congregate to savour their nostalgia! The 10th Reunion meeting was held at AFTC, presided over by the incumbent commandant Air.Cmde. C.R.Mohan V.S.M. when 22 octogenarian ex-apprentices were honoured, followed by a gala lunch at the aircraft hangar on 4 July 2017 coinciding with the college raising day. The speech of the commandant entailing a visionary approach for the future growth of the college was greatly appreciated by the veterans.

After TTC was renamed as AFTC on 1 January 1957, Gp. Capt M.J. Kriplani MBE took over as the first Indian commandant of the college. AFTC is the alma mater for all technical officers of the Indian Air Force. In December 1962, during the national emergency, the Apprentices' Training Scheme was terminated with the 22nd Entry, and the Direct Entry officers' training was accelerated. In Dec 1971 the four technical branches of Tech (Engines), Tech (Elect), Tech (Signals) & Tech (Armament) were integrated into two i.e., Aeronautical Engineering (Mechanical) and Aeronautical Engineering (Electronics) designated as AE(M) and AE(L). The first batch to graduate under this scheme commenced their training in Jan 1972. The college is equipped with many Engineering and Science laboratories, fighter, bomber, and transport aircraft, and has an airfield.

The crest of the college depicts a mechanical gear and emanating electrical waves superimposed by torch bearing an eternal flame. The President of India approved the crest on 8 Aug 1962. The motto on the crest is 'Gyanen Shobhamahe' (it is knowledge through which we find pride in ourselves). The college was awarded the "Presidential Colors" by Pratibha Patil on 12 November 2008.

Milestones:

Some of the important events in the history of AFTC are given below:- (a) September 1951 - 1st Entry Passing out-Parade of Apprentices From T.T.C.

(b) 1 April 1954 - First Indian Chief of Staff Air Marshal Mukherjee takes salute at the Passing out Parade held in the college air field of 2nd entry Con-Course and 6th entry Apprentices.

(c) April 1956. Air Services Training Ltd.,(Hamble) hand over the training responsibilities to Indian staff.

(d)1 January 1957 - name changed to Air Force Technical College

(e) March 1958 - first Foreign Officer (Indonesian) joins

(f) August 1962 - President of India approves crest of AFTC Gyanen Shobhamahe'

(g) December 1962 - aircraft apprentices scheme comes to a close

(h) April 1993 - first batch of 25 women officers are inducted

(j) July 1999 - golden jubilee year celebrated

(k) August 2003 - establishment of Software Development Centre

(l) 26 May 2005 - Chief of Air Staff inaugurates Back- drop to Parade Ground

(m) 1 April 2006 - commencement of first distance education course

(n) 12 November 2008 - Presidential Colors awarded

(O) 14 November 2014 - surviving apprentices from 1st to 22nd entry visit. The commandant hosts a tea party in their honour

(p) 11 November 2016 - Presentation of rolling trophies and mementos for being awarded to future engineers by ex-apprentices

(q) 4 July 2017 - graduates celebrate the college raising day with a ceremonial lunch after a convention in the auditorium

(r) 4 July 2024- college celebrates its platinum jubilee. 75 years of glorious service to the nation. Air Commodore Ashutosh Shrivastava, Commandant, greeted the dignitaries, veterans and their families.

== Program ==
The stated aim of the college is to produce officers of the highest class with thorough professional excellence.

== Commandants ==
Commandants of AFTC
Rank	Name	Dates
Gp Capt	J Beaumont CBE DFC	July 1949 - July 1956
Gp Capt	MJ Kriplani MBE	July 1956 - June 1961
Gp Capt	K Narshiman	July 1961 - August 1965
Gp Capt	HD Mehra	July 1966 - September 1966
Gp Capt	RJ Hermon	November 1966 - January 1970
Gp Capt	JN Jungalwalla	January 1970 - June 1972
Air Cmde	SS Sehgal	June 1972 - January 1977
Air Cmde	Satinder Singh	January 1977 - June 1981
Air Cmde	SK Verma	July 1981 - January 1983
Air Cmde	S Venkatraman	January 1983 - November 1983
Air Cmde	S Roy	December 1983 - March 1985
Air Cmde	CL Kotwal	March 1985 - September 1986
Air Cmde	JP Dhir	October 1986 - July 1988
Air Cmde	S Srinivasan VSM	August 1988 - January 1990
Air Cmde	PN Bajaj	January 1990 - April 1991
Air Cmde	SS Gupta VSM	April 1991 - February 1992
Air Cmde	K Badrinarayanan VSM	February 1992 - August 1994
Air Cmde	SKS Sitaram VSM	September 1994 - May 1996
Air Cmde	DS Gotra	November 1996 - December 1997
Air Cmde	SK Jindal	January 1998 - September 2000
Air Cmde	RC Kakar VSM	September 2000 - July 2002
Air Cmde	SL Sharma VSM	July 2002 - July 2004
Air Cmde	Kamal Singh AVSM	September 2004 - September 2006
Air Cmde	Rajiv Mital VSM	September 2006 - November 2008
Air Cmde	P Kanakraj VSM	December 2008 - August 2009
Air Cmde	AK Paul VSM	August 2009 - Feb 2012
Air Cmde	Alok Singh	Feb 2012- Dec 2013
Air Cmde	MK Guleria VSM	Dec 2013- Dec 2014
Air Cmde	PK Shrivastava VSM	Dec 2014- Mar 2016
AVM	PK Shrivastava VSM	Apr 2016 - Apr 2016
Air Cmde	CR Mohan VSM	May 2016 - Feb 2019
AVM	CR Mohan VSM	Feb 2019 - Feb 2019
Air Cmde	Biji Philip VSM	Feb 2019 - Aug 2021
Air Cmde	Sameer Kalode VSM	Sep 2021- Nov 2022
Air Cmde	Ratnesh Gupta VSM	Nov2022-Dec2023
Air Cmde	Ashutosh Shrivastava VSM	Dec 2023 - Dec 2025
Air Cmde	K Giri VSM	Dec 2025 - current
