= P. Sheshadri =

Indian film director (born 1963)

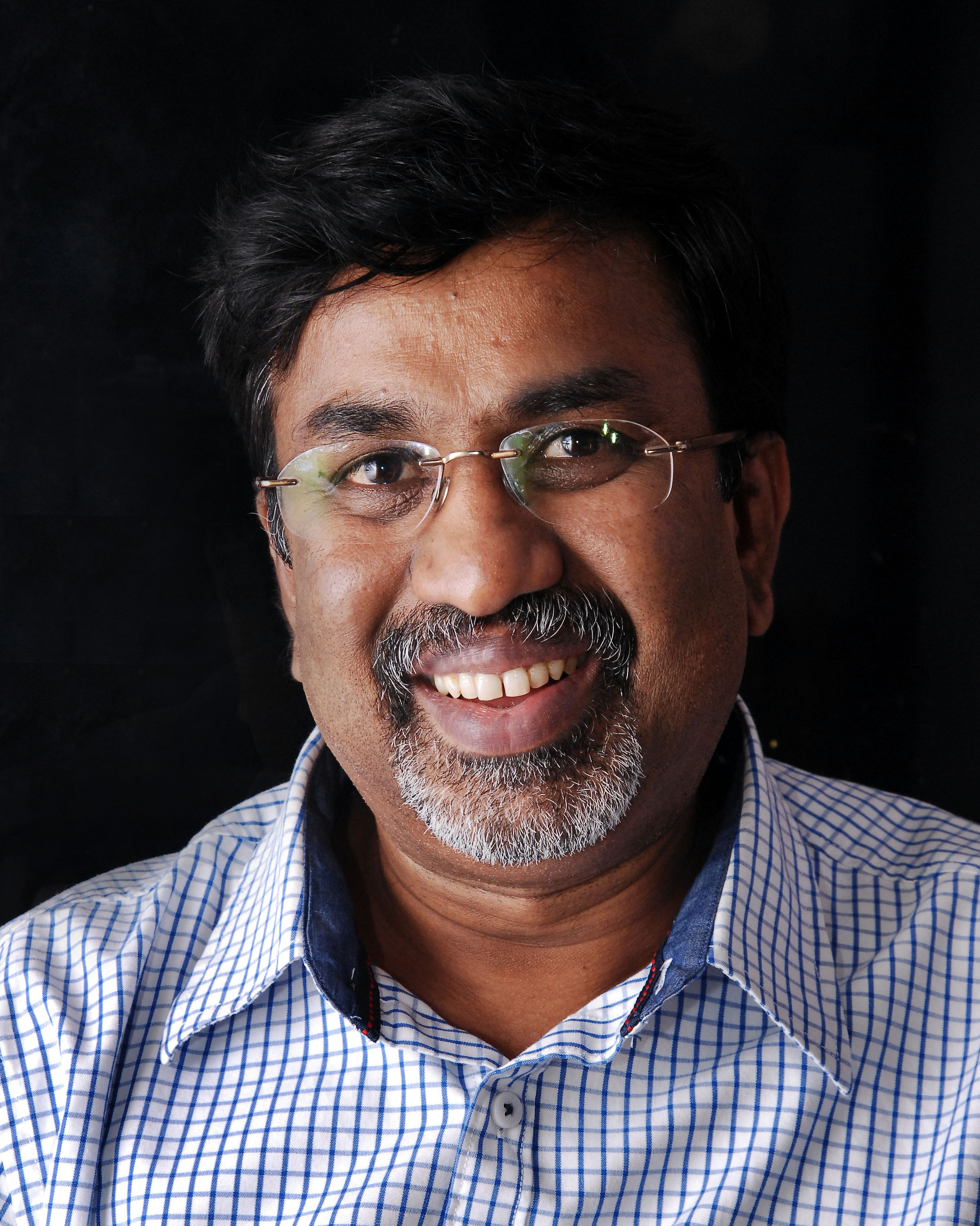
- P. Sheshadri in 2013
- Born: Pattabhiramaiah Sheshadri; 23 November 1963 (age 62); Dandinashivara, Tumkur, Mysore State (now Karnataka), India
- Occupation: Film director
- Website: www.psheshadri.com

Pattabhiramaiah Sheshadri (born 23 November 1963) is an Indian film director who works in Kannada cinema. He is known for his films Munnudi, Atithi, Beru, Tutturi, Vimukthi, Bettada Jeeva, Bharath Stores and December-1. He has also worked as a director in various television serials.

Sheshadri became the first director to win a National Film Award eight times consecutively when his film December-1 won the National Film Award for Best Feature Film in Kannada and the National Film Award for Best Screenplay.

== Early life and education ==
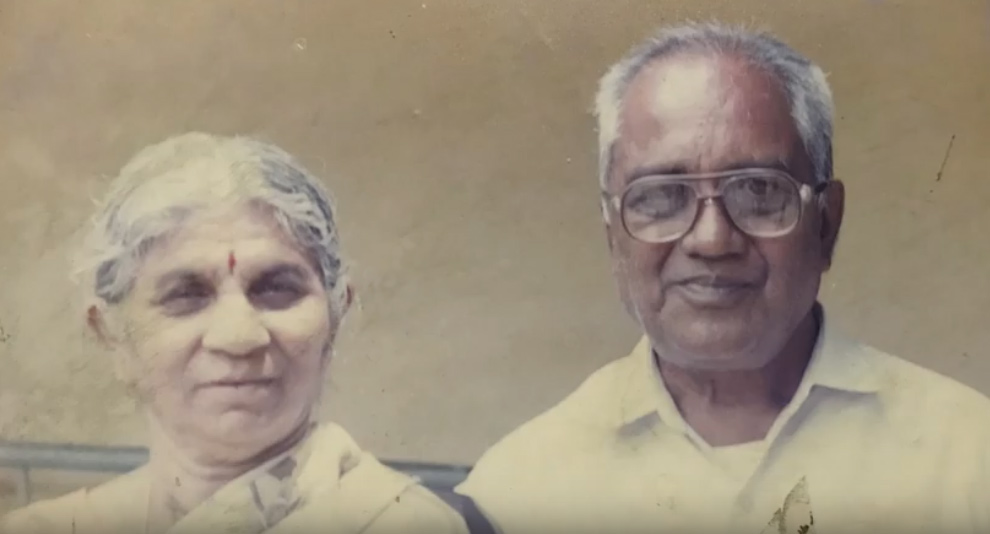
Parents of P. Sheshadri

Sheshadri was born on 23 November 1963 in the village of Dandinashivara in Karnataka to Pattabhiramaiah, a primary school teacher, and Kamalamma. He is the youngest of four siblings. He completed his master's degree in Kannada literature and also received a diploma in journalism from University of Mysore.

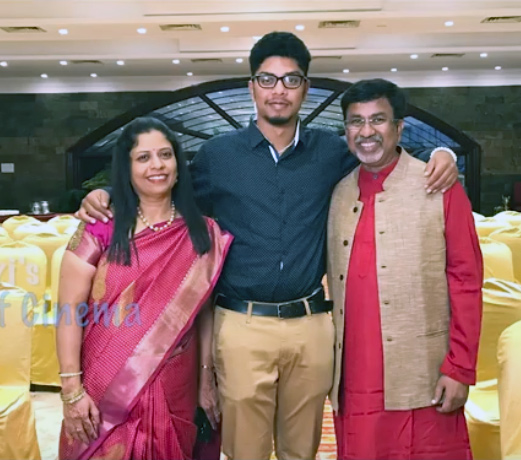
P. Sheshadri, with wife and son

== Career ==
=== Before 1990: Journalism ===
Sheshadri began his career working at Navakarnataka Prakashana, a publishing house, where he designed cover pages for the publication. His next job was at Suddi Sangaati, a Kannada weekly. He wrote film reviews and features on films during his time there which provided him an opportunity to understand the Kannada film industry. He began attending film festivals where he was exposed to world cinema for the first time. This inspired him to make his own films.

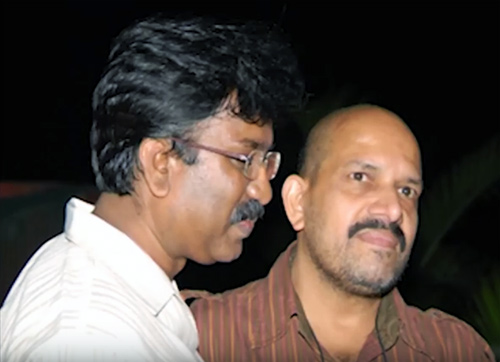
P. Sheshadri (left) and V. Manohar at a ceremony

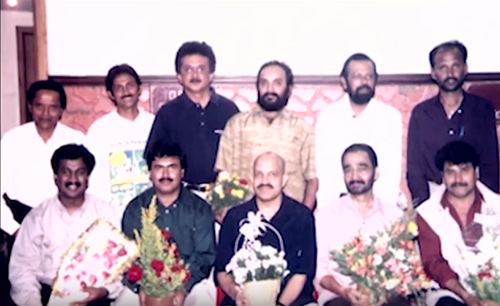
P. Sheshadri (first in second row), V. Manohar (third in second row) and Bolwar Mahammad Kunhi (fourth in second row)

=== 1990–1995: Entry into films ===
Sheshadri started working in films and television by writing scripts and assisting the established director T. S. Nagabharana, with who he worked in three films Aakasmika (1993), Chinnari Mutha (1993) and Sagara Deepa (1994), "besides serials and documentaries". He called working with Nagabharana "...a good learning experience." Sheshadri then wrote the screenplay and dialogue for Gowrishankar (1995).

=== 1995–2000: Working in television ===
Sheshadri made his television debut as director with 'Inchara in 1995. He then made 'Kamanabillu. When DD Chandana (DD 9) were looking for new directors to make television series for them, Sheshadri made Kalyanamasthu, using predominantly stage actors. His then made Kathegara (1996), an adaptation of short stories such as Kamalapurada Hotelinalli by Panje Mangesh Rao and of Mogalli Ganesh. He co-directed the series alongside Seetharam and Nagendra Sha. The series became popular and was moved from DD Chandana to DD National where it completed the full run of 78 episodes. The trio then made Mayamruga in 1999 which went to become hugely popular as well.

=== 2000–present: First film and directorial career ===
During the 31st International Film Festival of India in New Delhi in 2000, Sheshadri watched the Malayalam film Karunam which had won the Best Feature Film award at the festival. He learnt during a conversation with the film's director that it was made on a budget of ₹1 million. This gave him the confidence that a film could be made with a small budget.

Sheshadri then decided to adapt Bolwar Mahammad Kunhi's book Muttuchera into a film titled Munnudi (2000). He approached numerous producers assuring them he could make the film on a budget of ₹1 million but he was turned down by all of them and was also told that no Hindus would watch the film as all the characters in the story are Muslims and no Muslims would watch the film either since the story speaks up against their beliefs.

It was at this point that the idea to finance the film in a cooperative model struck him and he approached his friends from the film industry who each agreed to invest ₹100,000 each into the project. Munnudi ended up making a profit of ₹1 million at the end of its run.

Sheshadri and his friends decided to invest those profits into making his next film titled Atithi which starred Prakash Raj in the lead role. Sheshadri has continued to use this cooperative model and has financed five of his films using this method.

His Mohandas, based on the life of Mahatma Gandhi, an adaptation from Bolwar Mahammad Kunhi's book Papu Gandhi, Bapu Gandhi Aada Kathe and The Story of My Experiments with Truth, was released theatrically in 2021. In 2025, he began working on Ruby Cube, based on a short story of the same name written by his son, Pratham, centering around present-day society and relationships. The filming was completed in 15 days and was shot using three cameras and sync sound.

== Filmography ==
=== Films ===
Year	Title
2000	Munnudi
2002	Atithi
2004	Beru
2005	Thutturi
2008	Vimukthi
2010	Bettada Jeeva
2012	Bharath Stores
2014	December-1
2015	Vidaaya
2017	Beti
2019	Mookajjiya Kanasugalu
2021	Mohandas
2026	Ruby Cube

=== Television ===
Year	Title
1995	Inchara
1996	Kamanabillu
1996–1997	Kathegaara
1998	Mayamruga
2000–2001	Nikshepa
2001–2002	Kannaamuchaale
2003	Uyyale
2003–2004	Subbanna
2005–2006	Mounaraaga
2008–2009	Suprabhatha
2012	Chakrateertha
2015	Saakshi

== Awards ==
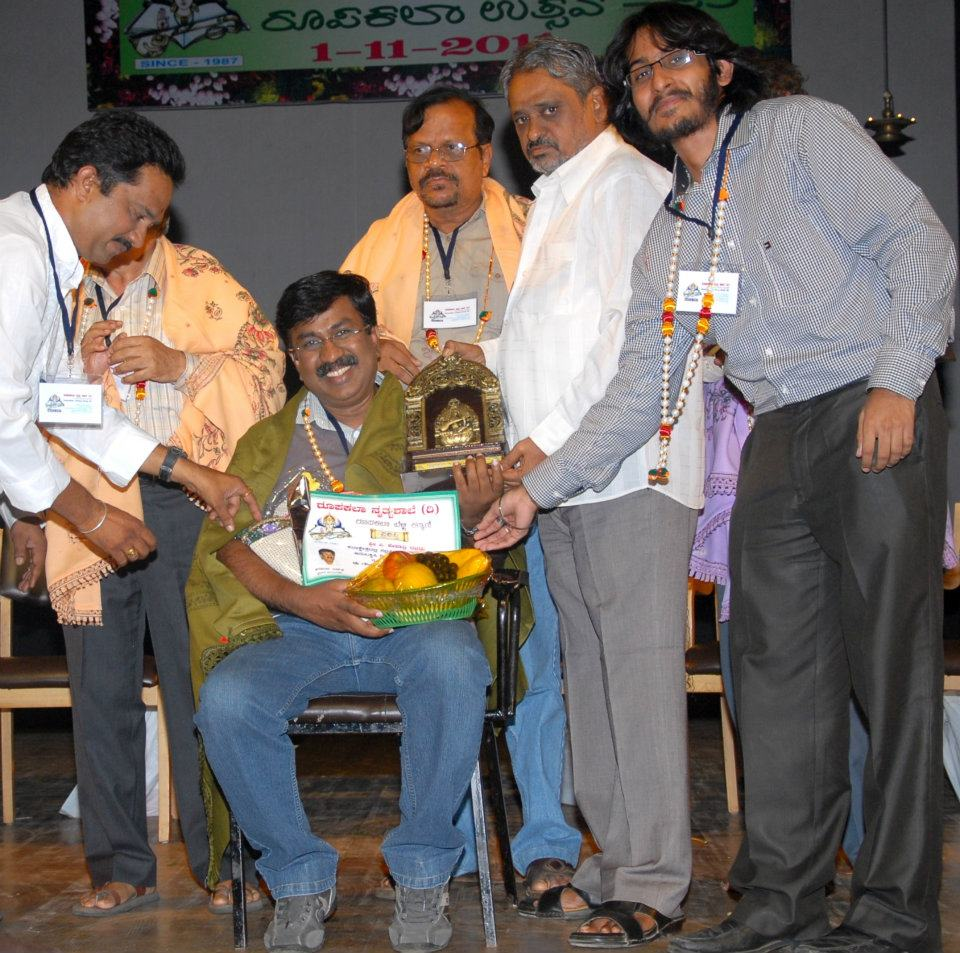
Sheshadri receiving the Roopakala Award, 2011

- For his Contribution to Kannada Cinema, awarded Honorary Puttanna Kanagal Award in Karnataka State Film Awards 2018.

=== National Film Awards ===
Year	Film	Category
2000	Munnudi	Best Film on Other Social Issues
2001	Atithi	Best Feature Film in Kannada
2004	Beru	Best Feature Film in Kannada
2005	Thutturi	Best Film on Environment Conservation/Preservation
2008	Vimukthi	Best Feature Film in Kannada
2010	Bettada Jeeva	Best Film on Environment Conservation/Preservation
2012	Bharath Stores	Best Feature Film in Kannada
2013	December-1	Best Feature Film in Kannada
2013	December-1	Best Original Screenplay

=== Karnataka State Film Awards ===
Year	Film	Category	Ref.
2000–01	Munnudi	Special Film of Social Concern	
2012	Bharath Stores	Second Best Film	
2014	Vidaaya	Best Screenplay	
2018	Mookajjiya Kanasugalu	Best Screenplay	
2018	Lifetime achievement	Puttanna Kanagal Award	

=== Dhaka International Film Festival ===
Year	Film	Category
2006	Thutturi	Children's Film: Best Audience Award
