= 2010–11 Karnataka State Film Awards =

Annual Indian film awards ceremony

- Date: 2013
- Location: Dharwad
- Country: India
- Presented by: Jagadish Shettar (Chief Minister of Karnataka)
- Most wins: Ondooralli (5)

The 2010–11 Karnataka State Film Awards, presented by the Government of Karnataka, recognised the best Kannada-language films released in the year 2010. The selection committee was headed by retired filmmaker S. K. Bhagavan.

== Lifetime achievement award ==
Name of Award	Awardee(s)	Awarded As
• Dr. Rajkumar Award • Puttanna Kanagal Award • Dr. Vishnuvardhan Award	• S. Shivaram • H. R. Bhargava • M. H. Ambareesh	• Supporting Actor, Producer, Director • Director • Actor

== Jury ==
A committee headed by S. K. Bhagavan was appointed to evaluate the feature films awards.

== Film awards ==
Name of Award	Film	Producer	Director
First Best Film	Maagiya Kaala	Bhagya Moodnakoodu Chinnaswamy	K. Shivarudraiah
Second Best Film	Thamassu	Syed Aman Bachchan, M. S. Ravindra	Agni Shridhar
Third Best Film	Manasa	Anitha Rani	Kodlu Ramakrishna
Best Film Of Social Concern	Byari	T. M. Altaf Hussain	Suveeran
Best Children Film	Ondooralli		
Best Regional Film	Naa Puttna Mann (Kodava language)		

== Other awards ==
Name of Award	Film	Awardee(s)
Best Direction	Maagiya Kaala	K. Shivarudraiah
Best Actor	Jackie	Puneeth Rajkumar
Best Actress	Sanju Weds Geetha	Ramya
Best Supporting Actor	Hejjegalu	Achyuth Kumar
Best Supporting Actress	Thamassu	Harshika Poonacha
Best Child Actor	Ondooralli	Chenna Kumar
Best Child Actress	Hejjegalu	Prakruthi
Best Music Direction	Ondooralli	Jayashree Aravind
Best Male Playback Singer	Puttakkana Highway ("Banda Daari")	Ravindra Soragavi
Best Female Playback Singer	Ondooralli ("Hadedaru Devaki")	Sriraksha Priyaram
Best Cinematography	Ondooralli	B. L. Babu
Best Editing	Aidondla Aidu	Suresh Urs
Best Lyrics	Kalgejje ("Ee Panchamavedada Naadadali")	A. Bangaru
Best Sound Recording	Kalgejje	Palani D. Senapathi
Best Art Direction	Sanju Weds Geetha	Ismail
Best Story Writer	Maagiya Kaala	Eshwar Chandra
Best Screenplay	Thamassu	Agni Shridhar
Best Dialogue Writer	Bhagavathi Kaadu	Lakshmipathi Kolar
Best Dubbing Artist (Male)	Veerabahu	Sringeri Ramanna
Best Dubbing Artist (Female)	Murali Meets Meera	Anushree
Jury's Special Award	Super (For Technical Innovation)	
