= 2012 Karnataka State Film Awards =

Annual Indian film awards ceremony

The Karnataka State Film Awards 2012, presented by Government of Karnataka, recognised the best of Kannada-language films released in the year 2012.

== Lifetime achievement award ==
Name of Award	Awardee(s)	Awarded As
• Dr. Rajkumar Award • Puttanna Kanagal Award • Dr. Vishnuvardhan Award	• M. Bhakthavathsala • Chi. Dattaraj • Rajesh	• Producer, Distributor • Director • Actor

== Jury ==
A committee headed by film producer K. C. N. Chandrashekar was appointed to evaluate the feature films awards.

== Film awards ==
Name of Award	Film	Producer	Director
First Best Film	Thallana	Thanmaya Chithra	N. Sudarshan
Second Best Film	Bharath Stores	• Amrutha Patil • Basant Kumar Patil	P. Sheshadri
Third Best Film	Edegarike	• Syed Aman Bachchan • M. S. Ravindra	Sumana Kittur
Best Film Of Social Concern	Karanika Shishu		
Best Children Film	Little Master		
Best Regional Film	Konchavaram (Banjara language)		
Best Entertaining Film	Krantiveera Sangolli Rayanna	Anand Appugol	Naganna
Best Debut Film Of Newcomer Director	Alemaari	B. K. Srinivas	Santhu

== Other awards ==
Name of Award	Film	Awardee(s)
Best Direction	Thallana	N. Sudarshan
Best Actor	Krantiveera Sangolli Rayanna	Darshan Thoogudeep
Best Actress	Thallana	Nirmala Chennappa
Best Supporting Actor	Kalavu	Kari Subbu
Best Supporting Actress	Olavina Ole	Aruna Balaraj
Best Child Actor	Karanika Shishu	Anil Kumar
Best Child Actress	Sheshu	Lepana
Best Music Direction	Alemaari	Arjun Janya
Best Male Playback Singer	Cyber Yugadol Nava Yuva Madhura Prema Kavyam ("Hale Cycle Hattikondu")	Vasu Dixit
Best Female Playback Singer	Little Master	Anuradha Bhat
Best Cinematography	Edegarike	Rakesh
Best Editing	Saagar	P. R. Soundar Raj
Best Lyrics	Ee Bhoomi Aa Bhanu (All Songs)	B. H. Mallikarjun
Best Art Direction	Karanika Shishu	Bheemeshappa
Best Story Writer	Angulimala	Baraguru Ramachandrappa
Best Screenplay	Kalavu	K. Y. Narayanaswamy
Best Dialogue Writer	Bheema Theeradalli	M. S. Ramesh
Jury's Special Award	Krantiveera Sangolli Rayanna	Ravi Varma (For Action Sequences)
