= Balaramana Dinagalu =

2026 Indian Kannada-Language film

- Directed by: K. M. Chaitanya
- Written by: K. M. Chaitanya
- Produced by: Padmavathi Jayaram; Shreyas
- Starring: Vinod Prabhakar; Priya Anand
- Cinematography: H. C. Venugopal
- Edited by: P. Haridas KGF
- Music by: Santhosh Narayanan
- Production company: Padmavathi Films
- Distributed by: KVN Productions
- Release date: 26 June 2026
- Running time: 151 minutes
- Country: India
- Language: Kannada

Balaramana Dinagalu is a 2026 Indian Kannada-language period crime drama film written and directed by K. M. Chaitanya and produced by Padmavathi Films. The film stars Vinod Prabhakar in his 25th feature film, along with Priya Anand and Atul Kulkarni in addition to the ensemble supporting cast including Sharath Lohitashwa, Avinash, Ashish Vidyarthi and Vinay Gowda.

The film's soundtrack and background score is composed by Santhosh Narayanan, in his debut Kannada film.. The cinematography is by H. C. Venugopal and editing is by P. Haridas KGF.

The film set in the 1980s and 1990s, commenced shooting in 2024 and completed in July 2025. The filming took place in diverse locales like Bengaluru, Mysore, Shivamogga, and Sakleshpur, the team wrapped up the filming over a span of 80 days. The film released across Karnataka on 26 June 2026 and KVN Productions took up the distribution rights.

== Synopsis ==
The story is set in the 1980s where Balarama, a migrant who becomes involved in the city's underworld and gradually rises through its ranks amid shifting alliances, gang rivalries and struggles for influence. Running parallel to some of the events depicted in Aa Dinagalu, the narrative explores the social and political environment that shaped Bengaluru's criminal networks during the period. As Balarama navigates the competing interests of prominent gang leaders and confronts the personal consequences of his choices, the film examines themes of ambition, loyalty, survival and the human cost of organized crime.

== Cast ==
- Vinod Prabhakar as Balarama
- Priya Anand as Revathi
- Atul Kulkarni as Agni Sreedhar
- Sharath Lohitashwa as Kotwal Ramachandra
- Avinash as Col. Devaiah
- Ashish Vidyarthi as Jayaram
- Ramesh Indira as Monappa Rai
- Vinay Gowda as Katthi
- K. S. Sridhar as Devaraj Shetty
- Aditya Ashree as Singli
- Rajath
- Dragon Manju
- Prathap Narayan
- Ashwin Hasan
- Arun
- Abhay Puneeth

== Music ==
The soundtrack and background score is composed by Santhosh Narayanan making his debut in Kannada cinema.

Track listing
No.	Title	Lyrics	Singer(s)	Length
1.	"Shuru Shuru"	Jayanth Kaikini	Sanjith Hegde, Punya	4:32
2.	"Tata Tata"	V. Nagendra Prasad	Santhosh Narayanan	4:20
3.	"Quarterru"	V. Nagendra Prasad	Sanjana Kalmanje	4:40
4.	"Yarilla Yarilla"	All Ok	All Ok	5:41

== Reception ==
Balaramana Dinagalu received generally mixed-to-positive reviews from critics, with most reviewers highlighting its recreation of Bengaluru's underworld during the 1980s and its attempt to place the story within a broader social and historical context. Deccan Herald described the film as a detailed reconstruction of a particular period in Bengaluru's history, noting its production design, cinematography and period atmosphere, while also observing that the narrative avoids romanticising its criminal characters despite drawing from real-life underworld influences.

Cinema Express and The New Indian Express praised director K. M. Chaitanya's focus on the circumstances that shape individuals involved in organised crime rather than presenting a conventional gangster narrative. The reviews highlighted the film's portrayal of the links between crime, politics and urban development, as well as performances by Vinod Prabhakar, Ashish Vidyarthi and Atul Kulkarni. At the same time, reviewers noted that the film's multiple storylines and large ensemble cast may require greater engagement from viewers.

The Times of India characterized the film as a chronicle of Balarama's rise and decline within Bengaluru's underworld during a period of changing power structures, while assigning it a moderate critical rating. Across reviews, there was broad agreement that the film's primary strengths lie in its period setting, depiction of Bengaluru's criminal ecosystem and historical references, although opinions varied regarding its pacing and narrative complexity.
