= Head Bush =

- Theatrical release poster
- Directed by: Shoonya
- Written by: Agni Shridhar
- Produced by: Dhananjaya; Ramco Somanna
- Starring: Dhananjaya; Payal Rajput; Balu Nagendra; Devaraj; Vasishta N. Simha; V. Ravichandran; Yogesh; Raghu Mukherjee
- Cinematography: Sunoj Velayudhan
- Edited by: Joseph K. Raja; Harish Komme
- Music by: Charan Raj
- Production companies: Daali Pictures; SD Manna Talkies; Zee Studios
- Distributed by: Zee Studios
- Release date: 21 October 2022
- Running time: 138 minutes
- Country: India
- Language: Kannada

Head Bush (Note: Head and bush refer to sides of a coin. The name was a gambling game from 1970s Bangalore.) is a 2022 Kannada-language gangster film directed by Shoonya, written by Agni Shridhar, and produced by Dhananjaya and Ramco Somanna under the banner of Daali Pictures, SD Manna Talkies, and Zee Studios. The film features an ensemble cast of Dhananjaya, Balu Nagendra, Payal Rajput (in her Kannada debut), Devaraj, Yogesh, V. Ravichandran, Raghu Mukherjee, Vasishta N. Simha, Sruthi Hariharan, and Prakash Belawadi.

Head Bush was released on 21 October 2022. It received mixed to negative reviews from critics and became a box-office bomb.

== Premise ==
In the late 1970s in Bangalore, M. P. Jayaraj alias "Head Bush" and his friends, Ganga and Samson, are called by Devraj Urs's son-in-law, MDN, to head "Indira Brigade" which was formed to protect Indira Gandhi's reputation. With unlimited money flowing from the politicians and cops, Jayaraj takes control over Bangalore, but petty issue triggers Jayaraj's gang, which leads to a personal rivalry between Jayaraj and his gang.

== Cast ==
- Dhananjaya as M. P. Jayaraj
- Balu Nagendra as Samson
- Payal Rajput as Reshma
- Sruthi Hariharan as Rathna Prabha
- V. Ravichandran as a professor (guest appearance)
- Vasishta N. Simha as Kotwal Ramachandra
- Yogesh as Tigalarapete Ganga
- Raghu Mukherjee as M. D. Nataraj
- Devaraj as Devraj Urs
- Avanthika as Indira Gandhi
- Prakash Belawadi

== Production ==
Sandy was initially considered for the role of Samson.

== Soundtrack ==
The music of the film is composed by Charan Raj

Track listing
No.	Title	Lyrics	Singer(s)	Length
1.	"Sakkare Putta"	Nagarjun Sharma	Meghana Bhat	3:18
2.	"Habibi Habibi"	Dhananjaya	Vagu Mazan; Aishwarya Rangarajan	3: 46
3.	"Head Bush title track"	Karthik Chennoji Rao	Charan Raj; Karthik Chennoji Rao	3: 30
4.	"Rowdigalu Naavu Rowdigalu"	Agni Shridhar	Sanjith Hegde and Deepak Blue	2:52

== Reception ==
Sridevi S of The Times of India gave 3 out of 5 stars and wrote "If you are a fan of commercial films, Head Bush has the right ingredients to offer, that if you can manage to sit through the slow first half".

Muralidhara Khajane of The Hindu wrote "Despite being a well-written gangster drama that marries a political thriller, poor character writing and execution trouble this Dhananjaya film". Y Maheshwara Reddy of Bangalore Mirror gave 3.5 out of 5 stars and wrote "For a peek into the 1970s, this film is a must-watch".

Vivek M V of Deccan Herald gave 2.5 out of 5 stars and wrote "The makers stay clear of any standpoint. It's also not right to expect the entire truth in a biopic. But is it too much to ask for a team filled with potential to deliver to its fullest?" Shuklaji from The News Minute gave 2.5 out of 5 stars and wrote "Head Bush, as a film and the first episode of a potential long series, promises a lot but delivers on very, very little because the film, unfortunately, is consumed by its own lack of clarity".

A. Sharadhaa of Cinema Express gave 3 out of 5 stars and wrote "Overall, Head Bush highlights crime, friendship, and family, and makes for a perfect outing for lovers of gangster films".

== Controversy ==
The film became controversial because of a scene that allegedly insults Veeragase, a folk dance form of Karnataka. In a film sequence, a character refers to the Dharmaraya chariot as "jijubi" (useless). Sathish, a trustee of the Dharmaraya temple, said that the community was offended by the scene and urged the makers to remove it. He also claimed that the chariot shown in the movie is not a real one and further offered to provide the makers with actual footage of the chariot.
