= Kotwal Ramachandra =

Indian gangster

Kotwal Ramachandra

Kotwal Ramachandra was a gangster in Bengaluru in the 1970s and 1980s. He covered Bengaluru North and operated in Kodandarampura and Srirampura there. He was a contemporary of rival M. P. Jayaraj. The two had a power struggle over who would rule the Bangalore underworld under the crime boss Oil Kumar. Jayaraj was successful in bumping off Ramachandra with the help of Agni Shridhar, Bachchan and Varadharaja Nayak.

== Early life ==
Ramachandra was from Shimoga. He was over six feet tall, and used knives and sickles as his weapons. He was backed by some politicians in his heyday.

== Career ==
Ramachandra was known to carry out random attacks of innocents in public in order to invoke fear that led him to develop more unwanted enemies but alleviate the situations but not his market value as he assumed.

=== Political links ===
Ramachandra gained access to political circles when he started working as driver and body guard to then Chief Minister of Karnataka, D. Devaraj Urs. He threatened Ramakrishna Hegde, another Chief Minister with a knife at an open house that was photographed by press.. He was accused of barging into the CM's daughters' Beauty Parlour in Sadashivanagar to threaten them. The ensuing search forced him to exit Bengaluru and seek shelter in the Tumakuru farmhouse where he was murdered.

== In popular culture ==
A motion picture in Kannada, Aa Dinagalu, directed by K. M. Chaitanya, prominently depicts the rise and murder of Ramachandra. Agni Sreedhar has written an autobiography, My Days in the Underworld-Rise of Bangalore Mafia (Westland, 2013), in which the murder of Kotwal Ramachandra has been highlighted.

== Murder trial ==
Jayaraj helped the four killers who murdered Ramachandra and disposed of his bones in the Bay of Bengal. He arranged for dog bones to be buried instead, with an intention to mislead the investigation and exonerate the killers.

== Death ==
He was killed on 22 March 1986 by a four-member goonda team, supported by Jayaraj. He was killed in a farm house near koratagere taluk Allalasandra, Tumkur. His death was not known to outside world for more than a month.

Some of his associates continued criminal activity after his death.

== Bibliography ==
- Sreedhar, Agni (2013). MY DAYS IN THE UNDERWORLD RISE OF THE BANGALORE MAFIA. Westland. ISBN 9789383260348.
