= Fair & Lovely =

Fair & Lovely or Fair and Lovely may refer to:

- Fair & Lovely (film), a 2014 Indian Kannada romance drama film
- Glow & Lovely, a skin-lightening cosmetic product of Hindustan Unilever, formerly known as "Fair & Lovely"
