= M. P. Jayaraj =

Gangster, Indian politician (c.1947–1989)

- Born: June 20, 1947; Thigallarapete, Bangalore, Karnataka, India
- Died: November 21, 1989 (aged 42); Bangalore, Karnataka, India
- Occupation: Gangster
- Political party: Indian National Congress

Mysore Puttaswamaiah Jayaraj, known as M. P. Jayaraj (1947–1989) was an Indian mafia gangster who operated in Bangalore during the 1970s and 1980s. He was a hobbyist wrestler from his childhood who seriously practiced at Annayappa Garadi in Thigalrapete. He was brought into forefront of Bangalore underworld by M. D. Nataraj, the then son-in-law of the Chief Minister of Karnataka Devaraj Urs.

== Political and underworld career ==
During the 1970s, the politics in Karnataka was undergoing an immense change, the backward classes were pushed to the forefront in all the spheres of life due to the policies of D. Devaraj Urs. Devaraj Urs helped the backward classes and Dalits through his government programmes. To deal with any opposition to the vision of upliftment of the poor and backward classes, the Devaraj Urs Govt used every tool at their disposal, whether legal or sheer illegal brute force. They had a tight grip on the underworld through their protege Jayaraj. They leveraged this to silence, intimidate and dispel fear in anyone who came in their way.

M. P. Jayaraj ruled the Bangalore underworld throughout the 1970s under the patronage of M. D. Nataraj, but after he was sentenced for 10 years in jail for assaulting a person called Thigallarapete Gopi in court premises, his hold on the underworld began to loosen, while he was in jail Devaraj Urs died, when he came out of it Bangalore was taken over by the new dons Kotwal Ramachandra and Oil Kumar. In the ensuing struggle to reign over Bangalore, Kothwal Ramachandra was killed by Agni Shridhar, Varadharaja Nayak and Bacchan who were backed by Jayaraj. Death of Kotwal Ramachandra is very well depicted in Kannada movie Aa Dinagalu. Jayaraj was popular with people. He ran a newspaper "Ghareebi Hatao" targeting Janata Dal politicians and police. He had a very strained relation with the police force as he openly criticized them on Rasheed Murder Case.

M.P. Jayaraj was later sent to jail in an attempt to murder case [307 case]. He was attacked in front of the Bengaluru Central Jail (today's Freedom Park) by a group consisting of Pushparaj alias Cottonpete Pushpa, Chakre, Bekkinakannu Rajendra and others. He was able to fight off the assassins and escaped their attempt on his life by fleeing into the jail. He later requested to be transferred to Mysore jail for his safety. 15 days later, when he was admitted in the K R hospital, he was once again attacked by a group of sharp shooters. Jayaraj managed to fend off the attackers by hurling bombs at them and he escaped unscathed. In the meantime, his associate, Station Shekar was killed in a police encounter. Jayaraj used his newspaper "Gareebi Hatao" and also his influence to trouble the police in this matter, however the case didn't stand and it failed. Jayaraj later thought of contesting for the MLA elections as an independent candidate from Jayanagar as the Congress party refused him the ticket. He took a bail from the court to contest for the elections and was rallying in his area every day for the elections. He would visit Siddapura police station every day to sign.

== Death ==
On 21 November 1989, one day before he would go to jail, Jayaraj was returning from Siddapura police station after signing. He was accompanied by his brother M.P. Umesh, Lawyer Vardhamanayya and his associates in his ambassador car. At 7:20AM when his car approached the Lalbagh gate, he was assassinated by Muthappa Rai, Subash Singh Thakur and 10 others. A bullet was fired from the back which led to the driver M.P. Umesh lose control and hit the footpath on the left. As soon as the car stopped, everyone in the car except Jayaraj and Lawyer Vardhamanayya ran away. The assassins surrounded Jayaraj's car and started showering the bullets. Although his Lawyer Vardhamanayya used himself as a shield to protect him and despite being assisted through a bomb by his associate standing at a distance, Jayaraj failed to escape this time. He was shot dead in the head at 7:20AM while returning to his home from the police station.

== Bibliography ==
- Shridhar, Agni (2013). My Days in the Underworld: Rise of the Bangalore Mafia. Westland. ISBN 9789383260348.
