= Vinod Prabhakar =

Indian film actor

- Born: 3 December 1980 (age 45); Bangalore, Karnataka, India
- Occupations: Actor; Producer
- Years active: 2002–present
- Spouse: Nisha
- Father: Tiger Prabhakar

Vinod Prabhakar is an Indian actor and film producer, who has worked predominantly in Kannada cinema. He made his debut with the film Dil (2002). He is the son of actor Tiger Prabhakar.

== Career ==
In the action film Roberrt (2021), Vinod played a close associate to the titular character played by Darshan. His role and performance received praise from critics. Vinod ventured into film production in early 2022, and started he company Tiger Talkies, named after his father. However, the 'i' in Talkies was omitted due to numerological reasons, and he settled with the name Tiger Talkes, in July 2022. It was reported that he would produce an action film starring himself titled Lankasura. After it failed to release in 2022, his only release of the year was Varada. In the film, Vinod played a boy born into a lower middle-class family, raised by a mother, who goes on to become an engineer, and is grappling with a fraught relationship with his father. The film received mixed reviews from critics. However, Vinod's performance received praise. The reviewer for The Times of India stated that he is "at his best as Varada". In the social action-drama Fighter (2023), Vinod played a principled young man who takes on systemic corruption and social injustice.

He played an eponymous role in the period-drama Maadeva. Set in the 1980s, he plays a reclusive and emotionally-detached village hangman whose life is unsettled by human connection. The film was a commercial success, and completed a 50-day run at the box office. His performance received praise from critics. A. Sharadhaa of The New Indian Express called his "most restrained performance yet..." and wrote, "What elevates Vinod Prabhakar’s performance is how he sheds his action-hero skin and inhabits the role of a broken man. His walk, stillness, and silence speak more than words. His rage simmers only when needed; his expressions carry quiet intensity." The reviewer for The Times of India wrote, "Vinod Prabhakar delivers one of his best, portraying the shades of a broken man with intense depth, reminiscent of Upendra in Anatharu. His action impresses, but it's his monstrous side that's hardest to watch."

Vinod's latest film is Balaramana Dinagalu, a take on organized crime inspired by real events and is directed by K. M. Chaitanya.

== Filmography ==
=== Films ===
Key
†	Denotes films that have not yet been released

Year	Film	Role	Notes	Ref.
2002	Dil	Vinod		
2002	Phatinga			
2004	Srusti	Santosh	Credited as Junior Prabhakar	
2006	Maha Nagara	Vinod		
2007	VIP 5			
2007	Circle Rowdy	Nagaraj		
2008	Navagraha	Tony		
2011	Hori	Krishna		
2013	Gajendra	Gajendra		
2014	Belli	Babu		
2016	Tyson	Deepu		
2017	Crack	Crack		
2018	Mari Tiger	Tiger		
2019	Yajamana	Himself	Special appearance	
2019	Rugged	Shivu		
2021	Shadow	CM or Common Man		
2021	Roberrt	Raghava		
2022	Varada	Varada		
2023	Fighter	Mohak		
2025	Maadeva	Maadeva		
2026	Balaramana Dinagalu	Balarama		
2026	Nelson †	TBA		
2026	Lankasura †	TBA	Also producer	
