= Raju James Bond =

Indian Kannada-language Spy comedy film

- Theatrical release poster
- Directed by: Deepak Madhuvanahalli
- Written by: Deepak Madhuvanahalli
- Produced by: Manjunath Vishwakarma; Kiran Bharathuru
- Starring: Gurunandan; Mrudula Pattanashetti; Chikkanna; Achyuth Kumar
- Cinematography: Manohar Joshi
- Edited by: Amit Javalkar
- Music by: Anoop Seelin
- Production company: Karma Bros Productions
- Distributed by: Sathya Cine Distributors
- Release date: 14 February 2025
- Running time: 136 minutes
- Country: India
- Language: Kannada

Raju James Bond is a 2025 Indian Kannada-language Spy comedy film written and directed by Deepak Madhuvanahalli. The film stars Gurunandan as Raju along with Mridula Pattanashetti, Achyuth Kumar, Chikkanna and P. Ravishankar in pivotal roles. It is jointly produced by Manjunath Vishwakarma and Kiran Bharathuru under Karma Bros Productions banner. The film's music is composed by Anoop Seelin and cinematography is by Manohar Joshi.

The film was announced and went on floors and the shooting was completed in 2018. However, the release was postponed multiple times and took nearly seven years to finally release on 14 February 2025. The filming took place in villages around Srirangapatna and Sanduru with few shots filmed in London. The film's trailer was unveiled by actor Sriimurali on 12 February 2025. Upon release, the film met with critical response from critics and failed to impress the audience.

== Premises ==
Raju dreams of becoming a bank manager in Suvarnapura while carrying the burden of saving his family home from debt, a promise made to his late father. His love for Vidya, a teacher and the sister of a bank committee member, complicates his struggles. As Suvarnapura's MLA Bhootayya adds to his troubles, Raju joins forces with his eccentric uncle, a news reporter, an astrologer, and a mysterious friend.

== Cast ==
- Gurunandan as Raju
- Mrudula Pattanashetty as Vidya
- Chikkanna
- Sadhu Kokila
- P. Ravishankar as MLA Bhootayya
- Achyuth Kumar as Krishna
- Jai Jagadish
- Vijayalakshmi Singh
- Tabla Nani
- Manjunath Hegde
- Vijay Chendur
- Meera Kiran
- Jayasimhan
- Triveni Sashistha
- Shivamogga Ramanna
- Master Nikhil
- Danam Shivamogga

== Production ==
In August 2018, it was reported that actor Gurunandan would be continuing his "Raju" titled films after his successful First Rank Raju and Raju Kannada Medium, this time in a James Bond character. The film's story was reported to be based on a bank robbery that takes place in Punjab. The first look of the character was also revealed. The film went through multiple hurdles for release including the COVID-19 pandemic. After multiple date announcements, the film officially was brought to screens on 14 February 2025 coinciding the Valentines Day. It was announced that the film will be released in both Kannada and Hindi languages on the same date. The distribution was taken up by Sathya Cine Distribution in Karnataka. The producers announced that the film will also be released in US, UK, Canada, Australia and other parts of the world.

== Soundtrack ==
The soundtrack was composed by Anoop Seelin and the audio was marketed by A2 Music. The single "Kanmani" performed by Sanjith Hegde was released in January 2025

Track listing
No.	Title	Lyrics	Singer(s)	Length
1.	"Kanmani"	Jyothi Vyasaraj	Sanjith Hegde	4:49
2.	"James Bond"	Jyothi Vyasaraj	Chandan Shetty, Sanvi Shetty	4:13
3.	"Bekittha Bekittha"	Deepak Madhuvanahalli	Anthony Daasan	4:13
Total length:				13:02

== Reception ==
Y. Maheshwara Reddy of Bangalore Mirror rated the film 3 out of 5 and wrote, "Had the director focused on the screenplay, the movie would have been better. Having said that, it is still worth a watch".

A. Sharadhaa of The New Indian Express rated the film 2.5 out of five stars and wrote, "Raju James Bond is a quirky, if slightly flawed, drama that offers a local take on the story of an underdog facing seemingly insurmountable odds. It’s a film about a man who might not be the picture of a traditional hero, but whose journey is compelling in its own, imperfect way".
