= Gurunandan =

Indian film and television actor

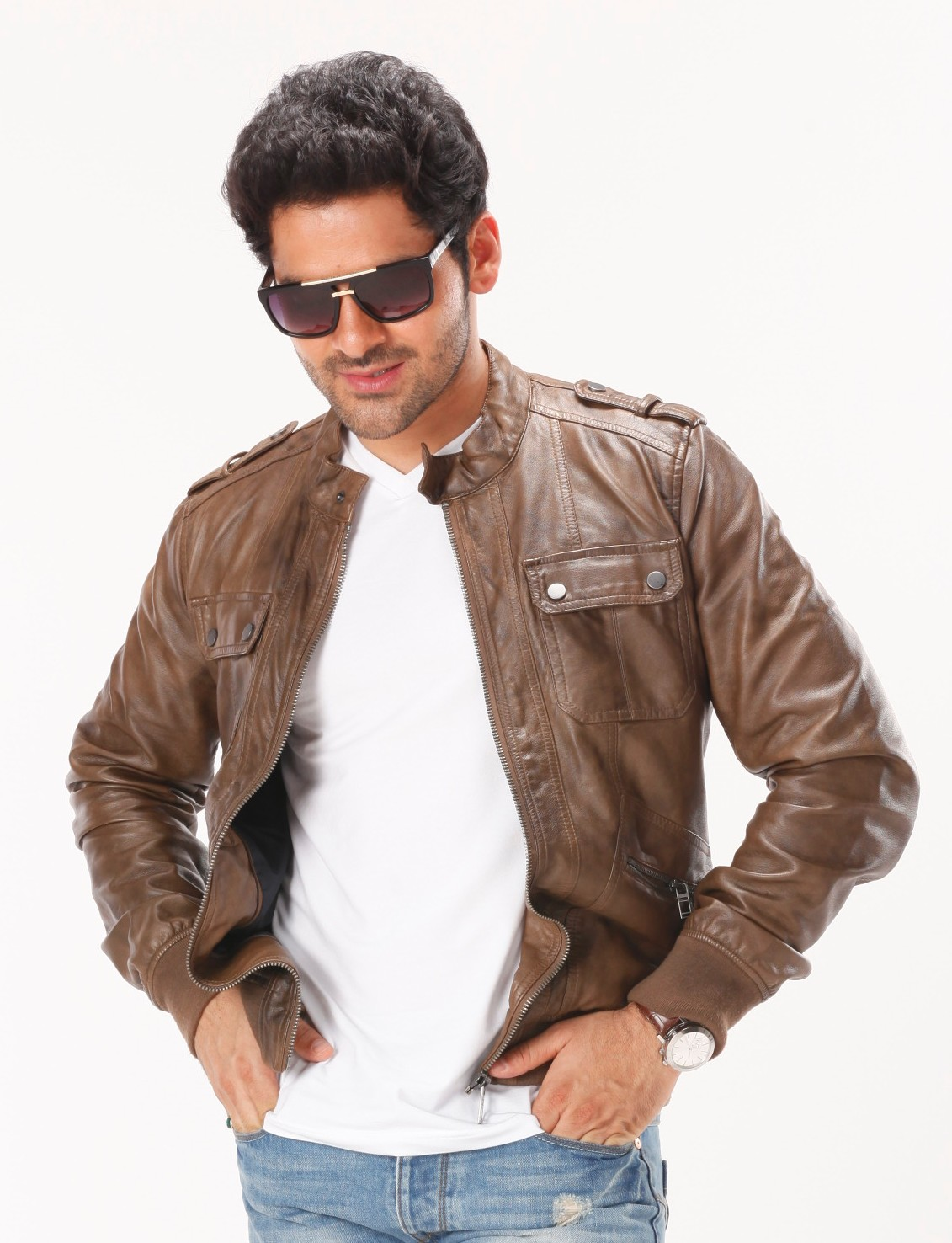
- Born: Gurumurthy; Mudigere, Karnataka, India
- Other names: Raju, Rank Star
- Occupations: Actor, Model
- Years active: 2011–present

Gurumurthy credited as Gurunandan, is an Indian film and television actor working in Kannada cinema. After having worked in small roles in television series, he rose to fame with the popular series Lakumi aired on the Asianet Suvarna. Following this, he made his big screen lead debut with Cyber Yugadol Nava Yuva Madhura Prema Kavyam (2014). His breakthrough came with his second film in a lead role, First Rank Raju (2015) for which he received both critical acclaim and commercial success.

== Early life ==
Gurunandan was born as Gurumurthy in Mudigere, Chikkamagaluru District, Karnataka. After completing his 8th grade in school, he ran away from his home to Bangalore to try his luck in cinema.

== Career ==
Gurunandan made his debut in mainstream cinema with the experimental romantic film Cyber Yugadol Nava Yuva Madhura Prema Kavyam, where he starred opposite Shwetha Srivatsav. His performance was well-received, earning him a nomination for the SIIMA Best Male Debut Award. However, the film underperformed at the box office.

Gurunandan gained widespread recognition with the 2015 comedy-drama First Rank Raju, where he played the titular role of Raju. The film was both a critical and commercial success, establishing him as a promising actor in Kannada cinema.

Gurunandan acted in films such as Chiravada Nenapu (2016), Smile Please (2017), and Raju Kannada Medium (2018). His 2019 film Missing Boy saw him portray the emotionally layered character of Nishchay Jagdish.

== Filmography ==
Year	Film	Role	Notes
2012	Cyber Yugadol Nava Yuva Madhura Prema Kavyam	Jayantha	Nominated - SIIMA Best Male Debut Award
2015	Charlie	Himself	Guest appearance
2015	First Rank Raju	Raju	
2016	Chiravada Nenapu	Raj	
2016	John Jani Janardhan	Himself	Guest appearance
2017	Smile Please	Manamohan/Manu	
2018	Raju Kannada Medium	Raju	
2019	Missing Boy	Nishchay Jagdish	
2025	Forest	Sunil	
2025	Raju James Bond	Raju	
2025	Mr. Jack	Jack AKA Janakirama	
TBD	Happy Ending	Vasu	Release date TBD
