= Fighter (2023 film) =

Indian Kannada-language action film

- Directed by: Nuthan Umesh
- Written by: Nuthan Umesh
- Produced by: Kattigenahalli Somashekar
- Starring: Vinod Prabhakar; Lekha Chandra; Paavana Gowda
- Cinematography: Shekar Chandra
- Edited by: KM Prakash
- Music by: Gurukiran
- Release date: 22 September 2023
- Running time: 112 minutes
- Country: India
- Language: Kannada

Fighter is a 2023 Indian Kannada-language action film written & directed by Nuthan Umesh and produced by Kattigenahalli Somashekar. The film stars Vinod Prabhakar, alongside Lekha Chandra and Paavana Gowda, Sharath Lohithaswa, Raj Deepak Shetty, Rajesh Nataranga and K. S. Sridhar. The music was composed by Gurukiran, while cinematography and editing were handled by Shekar Chandra and KM Prakash.

Fighter was theatrically released on 6 October 2023 and received mixed reviews from critics.

== Plot ==
Mohak, a writer, is compelled to kill his girlfriend Vismaya, whose father Venkoba is involved in transporting blood illegally outside the country. It is revealed that Mohak shot Vismays as his mother ACP Radha is kidnapped and blackmailed by a stranger. The stranger tells Mohak to kidnap Rama Naik, a landlord in Ramadurga. Mohak gets into Rama Naik's house through Rama Naik's daughter Paavana, Mohak's college friend.

Mohak kidnaps Rama Naik and brings him to a godown. Venkoba also arrives at the godown as he is called by the stranger in order to learn about Vismaya's killer. The stranger arrives with Radh, where it is revealed that the stranger is actually Mohak's grandfather Basavarajappa. Basvarajappa reveals that Mohak's father Kotresha tried to prevent the farmers of Ramadurga to use chemical fertilizers, which would lead to crop abundance.

Rama Naik and Venkoba wanted the farmers to use chemical as they want the farmers to sell the land for real estate businesses. Realizing that Kotresha is becoming a threat, Rama Naik and Venkoba killed Kotresha. Radha leaves with Mohak as he does not want Mohak to be involved in violence. After the revelation, Mohak kills Rama Naik and Venkoba and their henchmen, thus avenging Kotresha's death.

== Cast ==
- Vinod Prabhakar as Mohak
- Lekha Chandra as Vismaya
- Paavana Gowda as Paavana
- Nirosha as Radha, Mohak's mother
- Sharath Lohitashwa as Rama Naik
- Raj Deepak Shetty as Venkoba
- Rajesh Nataranga as Kotresha, Mohak's father
- K. S. Sridhar as Basavarajappa, Mohak's grandfather
- Kuri Prathap as Bhajarangi
- Girija Lokesh as Girija
- Pavan

== Soundtrack ==
The music was composed by Gurukiran.

== Reception ==
=== Critical response ===
A. Sharadhaa of The New Indian Express gave 3/5 stars and wrote that "Director Nuthan Umesh’s storytelling skills and Vinod’s action stunts make this film a one-time watch for audiences who appreciate films that seamlessly blend action with social messages". Vinay Lokesh of The Times of India gave 2/5 stars and wrote "Fighter sets out to be an action-packed commercial drama that takes no time to get into the main plot."
