= Smile Please (2017 film) =

- Theatrical Poster
- Directed by: Raghu Samarth
- Written by: Raghu Samarth
- Produced by: K Manju
- Starring: Gurunandan; Kavya Shetty
- Cinematography: J S Wali
- Edited by: Jo Ni Harsha
- Music by: J Anoop Seelin
- Production company: K Manju Cinemaas
- Release date: 10 February 2017
- Running time: 124 minutes
- Country: India
- Language: Kannada

Smile Please is a 2017 Indian Kannada romance film written and directed by Raghu Samarth, produced by K Manju under the banner K Manju Cinemaas. The film stars Gurunandan and Kavya Shetty in the lead roles. It began production in the mid of 2016.

== Plot ==
The movie Smile Please revolves around the protagonist Manu Gurunandan, who is a very happy soul, so full of life and keeps celebrating the life. He is always seen smiling and making others smile. Manu's family badly want him to get married but girls keep rejecting him for his funny and bold outlook towards marriage. After hundred girls rejecting him father gives up on his marriage but the mother who is little over dramatic decides to send her son to her brother Murthy's house. What happens next is in the movie is the plot.

== Cast ==
- Gurunandan as Manamohan
- Kavya Shetty as Maanasa
- Neha Patil as Anagha
- Sudha Belawadi as Ranga Nayaki
- Ravi Bhat as Paramahamsa
- Srinivas Prabhu as Sachchidananda Murthy
- Aruna Balraj as Gauri
- Rangayana Raghu as Sadananda
- Girish Shivanna as Pannaga Bhushan
- Shilpa Ravi as Nivedita
- Likhitesh Ravindra as Sunil
- Roopesh Shetty as Roopesh
- Hamsa Pratap as Ramya
- Master Chinmay as Rahul
- Avinash as Dr. Mithun

== Soundtrack ==
The music was composed by J. Anoop Seelin.

No.	Title	Artist(s)	Length
1.	"Rayar Kudre Katte Aytu"	Haricharan	3:29
2.	"Life Ondu Comedy"	Santhosh Venky	3:30
3.	"Kannalle Nee Deepa Hachchi"	Anoop Seelin, Samanvitha Sharma	4:08
4.	"Smile Please"	Anoop Seelin	3:50

== Reception ==
A critic from The Times of India wrote that "The film can be watched once, but the film does have some moments that are far stretched from reality".
