= Nirmala Chennappa =

Indian film director, actress, producer

- Born: June 21, 1987 (age 39); Karnataka, India
- Occupations: Film actress; dubbing artist; TV soap/serial director/producer
- Children: 1

Nirmala Chennappa or Nirmala Sathya is an Indian film director, producer and actress in the Kannada film industry best known for her role in Thallana (2013) for which she won the Karnataka State Film Award for Best Actress. She participated as a contestant in Bigg Boss Kannada season 8.

== Career ==
Nirmala Chennappa has been part of the film Thallana and many soaps/serials in Kannada. Nirmala was one of the contestants in the Bigg Boss Kannada (season 8) and got evicted on the 14th day of the show.

== Selected filmography ==
Year	Film	Role	Notes
2013	Thallana	Jaya	Won—Karnataka State Film Award for Best Actress
2016	Kiragoorina Gayyaligalu	Daanamma	Dubbing artist

=== Television ===
- Padmavathi (2017-2019) (as director)
- Kannada Kogile (2018) (as producer)

== See also ==
- List of people from Karnataka
- Cinema of Karnataka
- List of Indian film actresses
- Cinema of India
