= Suryakaanti =

Suryakanthi
- Directed by: K. M. Chaitanya
- Written by: K. Y. Narayanaswamy
- Produced by: M. Vasu and Sujatha
- Starring: Chetan Kumar; Regina Cassandra; Nassar
- Cinematography: K. C. Venu
- Music by: Ilaiyaraaja
- Release date: 14 January 2010
- Country: India
- Language: Kannada

Suryakanthi (transl. Sunflower) is a 2010 Indian Kannada language film directed by K.M. Chaitanya and starring Chetan Kumar, Regina Cassandra, Nassar. The music is scored by Illayaraja.

== Premise ==
The film is a story of an international assassin played by Chetan.

== Cast ==
- Chetan Kumar as Rohith / Surya
- Regina Cassandra as Kaanti
- Nassar as Malanna Bahdur
- Ganesh Yadav as Stalin
- Ramakrishna as Saheba
- Kishori Ballal
- Sangeetha Gopal (Cameo)

== Soundtrack ==
All music is composed by Ilaiyaraaja.

No.	Title	Singers	Length
1.	"Swalpa Soundu"	Ilaiyaraja, Anitha Karthikeyan, Roshini, megha, Suvvi, Reshma, Neha
2.	"Chan Channare"	Shreya Ghoshal
3.	"Edeya Baagilu"	Kunal Ganjawala, Shreya Ghoshal
4.	"Mouni Naanu"	Karthik
5.	"Jaikaara Haakona"	Tippu, Roshini
6.	"Mouni Naanu (Pathos)"	Karthik

== Reception ==
=== Critical response ===
R G Vijayasarathy of Rediff.com scored the film at 2.5 out of 5 stars and says "As mentioned earlier, H C Venu's outdoor images are visually strong. Ilayaraja is very good in creating the background score. His two song compositions Edheya Baagilu Thattadhe and Mouna Neenu have raised above the bar of excellence. Chaithanya's Suryakanthi is worth a watch for Ilayaraja's work and superb outdoor shoot". B S Srivani from Deccan Herald wrote "So are Chetan and Regina. Dialogues sometimes tend to be stilted though... Swaying with gentle twists and turns, "Suryakaanti" allows little time for emotions to register. But this may indeed indicate a future when viewer intelligence finally gets its due. For now, "Suryakaanti" is an entertainer foremost and on that count, is "bhar-poor" 'paisa vasool' film". A critic from Bangalore Mirror wrote "Chetan's acting gets better by the day and Regina too has done a decent job. Ganesh Yadav as Stalin is brilliant in his role. The music is just about okay. The cinematography is commendable. All in all, the direction by K M Chaitanya has worked wonders this time too".
