= Thallana =

Indian drama film

- Theatrical release poster
- Directed by: N. Sudarshan
- Produced by: N. Sudarshan
- Starring: K. S. Shridar; Nirmala Chennappa; Nagendra Shah; Anil Kumar; Surabhi Vasisht; Mamatha
- Cinematography: Suryakanth Honnalli
- Edited by: M. N. Swamy
- Production company: Thanmaya Chithra
- Release date: 6 December 2013
- Country: India
- Language: Kannada

Thallana (transl. Distraught) is a 2013 Indian Kannada-language drama film directed by N. Sudarshan starring K. S. Shridar, Nirmala Chennappa, Nagendra Shah, Anil Kumar, Surabhi Vasisht and Mamatha.

== Plot ==
A school student and a maid Jaya's daughter Sushma goes missing. Jaya along with her husband Kumara go to the police station to no avail. Jaya works in Sadananda's house, but he is accused of being in a relationship with her by the police. Sadananda withdraws himself from the case as he has to deal with his daughter Gargi, who is forced to have an abortion by her in laws. How Jaya and Kumara find Sushma forms the rest of the story.

== Cast ==
- K. S. Shridar as Sadananda
- Nirmala Chennappa as Jaya
- Nagendra Shah as the police inspector
- Anil Kumar as Kumara
- Surabhi Vasisht as Gargi
- Mamatha as Sushma

== Production ==
The film was shot in South Bangalore and in villages near Kanakapura.

== Reception ==
A critic from The Times of India rated the film three-and-a-half out of five stars and wrote that "Armed with a neat script, director N Sudarshan has done a good job of the narration highlighting how poor parents of a girl face embarrassing situations and realities of society when their daughter goes missing with even the police failing to come to their help. A movie for every family to watch".

A critic from Indian Link wrote that "Nirmala Chennappa as Jaya, Sridhar as Sadananda, and Mamatha as Sushma exhibit great acting abilities. In many scenes the acting is so natural, that is doesn’t look like acting".

== Accolades ==
Event	Category	Recipient	Ref.
2012 Karnataka State Film Awards	First Best Film	Thallana	
2012 Karnataka State Film Awards	Best Director	N. Sudarshan	
2012 Karnataka State Film Awards	Best Actress	Nirmala Chennappa	
