= Maadeva =

Indian Kannada-language action drama film

- Theatrical release poster
- Directed by: Naveen Reddy. B
- Written by: Naveen Reddy. B
- Screenplay by: Naveen Reddy. B
- Story by: Naveen Reddy. B
- Produced by: R. Keshava Devasandra
- Starring: Vinod Prabhakar; Sonal Monteiro; Srinagar Kitty
- Cinematography: Balakrishna Thota
- Edited by: Vijay M. Kumar
- Music by: Pradyotthan
- Production company: Radhakrishna Pictures
- Distributed by: Jayadev Films
- Release date: 6 June 2025
- Country: India
- Language: Kannada
- Budget: 4 Crores
- Box office: 10 Crores

Maadeva is a 2025 Indian Kannada-language action drama film directed and written by Naveen Reddy. B, and produced by R. Keshava Devasandra. Set in the 1980s, the plot surrounds the backdrop of a jail and a train. The film stars Vinod Prabhakar and Sonal Monteiro in lead roles, along with Srinagar Kitty, Shruti, Malashri and Achyuth Kumar in key supporting roles.

The film's announcement following by the principal photography began in July 2022 in various parts of Karnataka and Hyderabad. The musical score and soundtrack for the film is composed by Pradyottan. The cinematography and editing were handled by Balakrishna Thota and Vijay M. Kumar respectively.

Maadeva was released on 6 June 2025 to positive reviews from critics and audience.

== Plot ==
Set in the 1980s, Maadeva follows the life of a solemn, emotionally detached hangman named Maadeva (Vinod Prabhakar), who resides in a remote Karnataka village. The film opens with a chilling sequence where Maadeva carries out a public execution, then calmly sits down to eat biryani at the gallows—an indication of his numbed spirit and acceptance of death as part of his routine.

Maadeva's daily existence is marked by solitude and a refusal to engage with the world around him. He avoids eye contact, speaks sparingly, and suppresses even ordinary emotional responses, refusing to offer compassion to others in need—to the point of denying a pregnant woman a seat or ignoring a playing child. This hardened existence begins to reshape when Parvathi (Sonal Monteiro), a kind and determined young woman, arrives seeking his help. Her mother, Subhadra (Chaithra Rao), is imprisoned, and Parvathi believes Maadeva, known inside the prison circles, can assist her with access or petitions. At first, Maadeva remains impassive, treating Parvathi’s pleas as another burden, but her warmth and steadfastness gradually chip away at his emotional walls.

Born into a fiercely traditional environment, Maadeva was quickly burdened by familial expectations and emotional loss. Trauma and isolation in his formative years drove him to seek solace in the certainty of death—resulting in his appointment as the village hangman. Over decades of performing executions, his heart hardened, and he deliberately shut himself off emotionally—an act of protection from the pain he regularly administers. His only consistent companionship is with Karunakar (Achyuth Kumar), a train loco pilot, and Nandish (Sumanth), both of whom recognize that Maadeva's emotional detachment is more about survival than cruelty.

Samudhra (Srinagar Kitty) emerges as a powerful adversary, seeking retribution for his brother’s inexplicable death. He becomes a looming threat to both Maadeva and Parvathi. Meanwhile, Kamalakshi (Shruti) portrays a cunning matriarch who manipulates prison politics to free her incarcerated son—escalating tensions further within and outside the jail walls. Samudhra’s brute force, Kamalakshi’s scheming, and hidden vendettas culminating in a sudden, surprise villain whose identity is revealed in a late twist, tilting Maadeva’s world into unexpected danger. Maadeva leverages his grim authority and newfound resolve to ensure justice—not just by enforcing death, but by protecting the innocent from injustice. In the end, he accepts his role with renewed consciousness and a fragile sense of humanity, acknowledging that his duty does not need to come at the expense of empathy.

== Cast ==
- Vinod Prabhakar as Maadeva
- Sonal Monteiro as Parvathi
- Srinagar Kitty as Samudhra
- Achyuth Kumar as Karunakar
- Shruti as Kamalakshi
- Bala Rajwadi
- Cockroach Sudhi as Jilebi
- Mico Nagaraj
- Muniraju
- Chaithra Rao as Subhadra
- Malashri in an extended cameo

== Soundtrack ==
The soundtrack consists of songs composed by Pradyotthan marking his debut in Kannada cinema. Audio was released on Think Music Kannada label.

Track listing
No.	Title	Lyrics	Singer(s)	Length
1.	"Edeli Thangaali"	Prasanna Kumar. M	Ananya Bhat	4:40
2.	"Path of Parvathi"	Sai Sarvesh	Malavalli Mahadevaswamy	4:17
3.	"Ma Ma Maadeva"	Traditional	Ananthu	3:41
Total length:				13:33
