= Aa Dinagalu =

- Promotional poster
- Directed by: K. M. Chaitanya
- Screenplay by: Girish Karnad
- Based on: Daadaagiriya Dinagalu by Agni Shridhar
- Produced by: Syed Aman Bachchan; M. S. Ravindra
- Starring: Chethan Kumar; Veda Sastry; Sharath Lohitashwa; Ashish Vidyarthi; Atul Kulkarni; Girish Karnad
- Cinematography: H. C. Venugopal
- Edited by: Nagendra Urs
- Music by: Ilaiyaraaja
- Production company: Megha Movies
- Release date: 19 October 2007
- Running time: 137 minutes
- Country: India
- Language: Kannada

Aa Dinagalu (transl. Those Days) is a 2007 Indian Kannada-language crime drama film based on the non-fiction novel Daadaagiriya Dinagalu by Agni Shridhar, and directed by K. M. Chaitanya. It stars Chethan Kumar in the lead role. The supporting cast features Veda Sastry, Sharath Lohitashwa, Ashish Vidhyarthi, and Atul Kulkarni. The plot revolves around mafia in Bangalore during the 1980s when gangsters Kotwal Ramachandra and M. P. Jayaraj dominated the Bangalore underworld. The film's soundtrack and background music was scored by Ilayaraja.

Upon theatrical release on 19 October 2007, the film received positive reviews from critics who acclaimed the screenplay and the acting performance of Sharath Lohitashwa who portrayed the role of Kotwal Ramachandra. The film won three awards each at the 2007–08 Karnataka State Film Awards and 55th Filmfare Awards South; the awards at the latter ceremony being Best Film, Best Director (K. M. Chaitanya) and Best Supporting Actor (Sharath Lohitashwa).

== Plot ==
Sridhar narrates the preview as story of Kotwal Ramachandra in Bangalore Underworld in 1975, which is coincidentally with declaration of emergency by Indira Gandhi and led to grooming of M. P. Jayaraj as the uncrowned king in Bangalore. Mostly involving for terrorising people, Jayaraj seems to have got imprisoned for contempt of court for 10 years. After the death of Indira Gandhi, Jayaraj is released from prison and finds Kotwal Ramachandra to have taken his spot. Chetan is a business magnate, a Konkani Brahmin with a vast empire of his father who falls in love with Mallika, a dance teacher hailing from Vokkaliga community.

The couple's relationship is not accepted by Chetan's father Girish Nayak, who hires Kotwal Ramachandra to handle the case. Chetan learns about this and is perturbed mentally. For coming as a hardship, Chetan seeks vengeance on Kotwal and seeks Jayaraj to help him in his mission, but just before this, an incident takes place at Kanishka Hotel brings bad reputation for Chetan, who is suspected by the police. After his release, Chetan further strengthen his plan with Sridhar and Bachchan and they befriend Kotwal's friend Siraj. Believing that Kotwal will be safe, Siraj sends this trio to Tumkur. However, Kotwal is killed when his right hand Shetty ditches him. After this, Girish realizes his mistake and unites Chetan and Mallika, who get married and lead a peaceful life.

== Cast ==
- Chethan Kumar as Chetan Nayak (dubbed by Dileep Raj)
- Veda Sastry (credited as Archana) as Mallika, Chetan Nayak's love interest
- Sharath Lohitashwa as Kotwal Ramachandra
- Ashish Vidhyarthi as M. P. Jayaraj
- Atul Kulkarni as Agni Shridhar
- Achyuth Kumar as Oil Kumar
- Dinesh Mangaluru as Seetharam Shetty
- Girish Karnad as Girish Nayak, Chetan's father
- Vinaya Prasad as Chetan's mother
- Natak Amaan as Muneer
- Aryan Deepak as Bachchan
- Satya as Sardar
- Asif Farooqi as Siraj
- Dharma as Sub-inspector Shivaraj
- Kishan Shetty as Daniel
- Nagendra Urs as Balarama
- Akbar as Rajendra
- Prabhakar as Samson
- Samyukta Hornad as Divya Naik
- Shwetha Srivatsav as Kothwal's wife
- P. D. Sathish Chandra

== Soundtrack ==
Aa Dinagalu

Soundtrack album by Ilaiyaraaja
- Genre: Feature film soundtrack
- Length: 7:58
- Label: Anand Audio

Ilaiyaraaja composed the film's background score and music for its soundtrack. The album consists of three tracks. Lyrics for them were penned by K. Kalyan and D. Sumana Kittur.

Track listing
No.	Title	Lyrics	Singer(s)	Length
1.	"Sihi Gaali"	K. Kalyan	Ilaiyaraaja, Nanditha	2:47
2.	"Aa Dinagalu"	D. Sumana Kittur	Vijay Yesudas	2:36
3.	"Aa Dinagalu"	D. Sumana Kittur	Vijay Yesudas, Nanditha	2:35
Total length:				7:58

== Critical reception ==
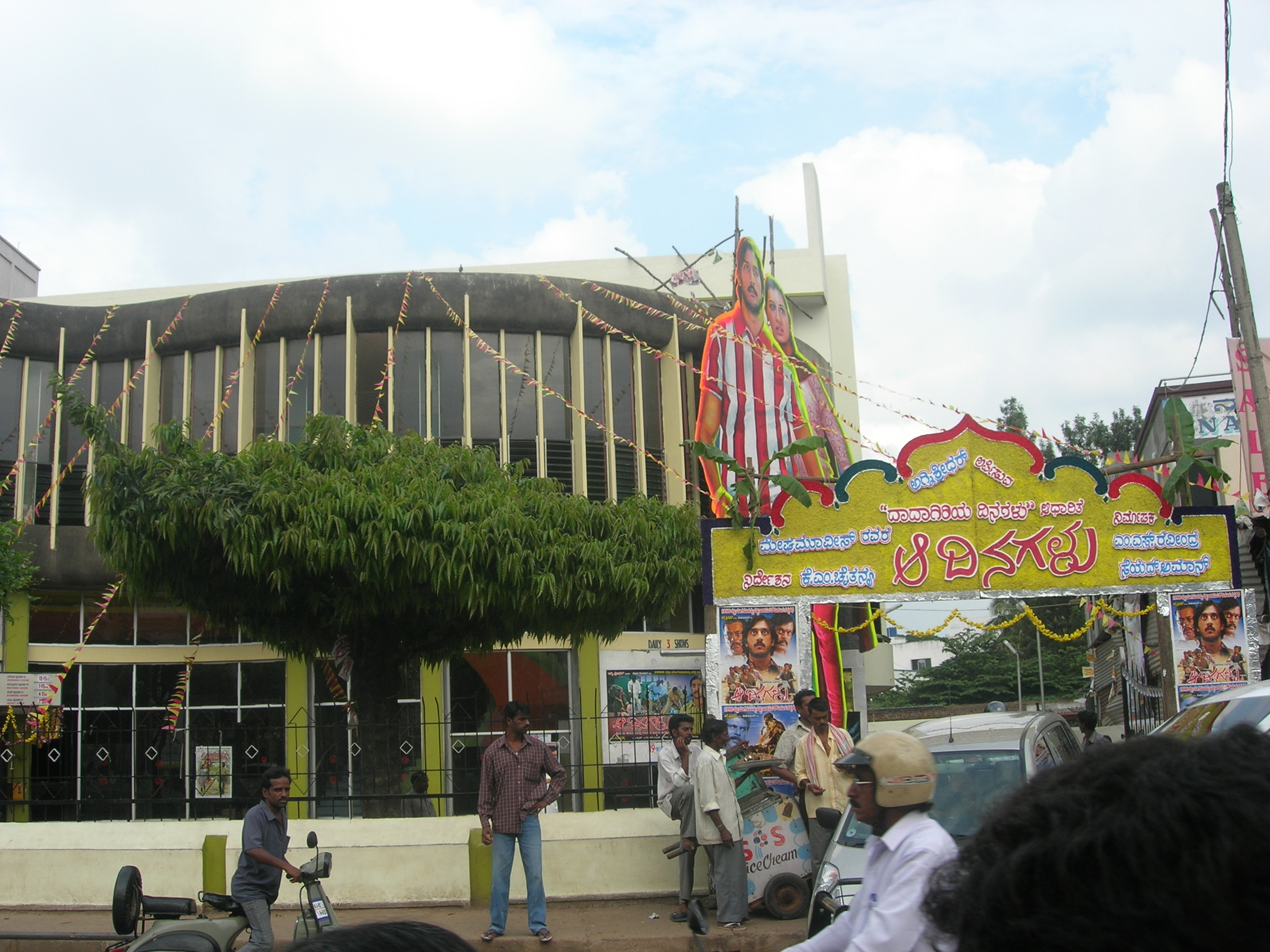
Lido Theatre, Mysore on the day of release

Upon theatrical release, Aa Dinagalu received generally positive reviews from critics. R. G. Vijayasarathy of Rediff reviewed the film rating it 3.5/5 and wrote, "Chaitanya has used a straightforward, simple narration resulting in a profound impact. The background score by Ilayaraja is one of the best heard in the recent times in Kannada films. Cameraman H. C. Venugopal has done a terrific job behind the camera. Sharath Lohithashwa is wonderful as Kothwal Ramachandra, while Atul Kulkarni, Ashish Vidyarthi, Girish Karnad, and the new face Chethan have all given wonderful performances in their respective roles" and concluded writing "Commendable direction, excellent star cast, high class technical crew and a fantastic script..." The Times of India in its review rated the film 3/5 and called the film a "brilliant portrayal of underworld don Kotwal Ramachandra." The reviewer concluded writing, "Sharath Lohithshwa, Ashish Vidyarthi and Atul Kulkarni are brilliant. While Girish Karnad gives a consummate performance, Archana shines and Dharma excels. H C Venu's camerawork is excellent. Ilayaraja's music is pleasing." The reviewer for Deccan Herald felt the film was "a damp squib". He felt, "the subject [was dealt] in a straight, staccato fashion that renders Aa Dinagalu more like docu-feature than a film that sparkles with auteur’s classic feel of the medium."

== Awards ==
Award / Film Festival	Category	Recipient	Result	Ref.
Karnataka State Film Awards	Best Cinematographer	H. C. Venugopal	Won	
Karnataka State Film Awards	Best Dialogue	Agni Shridhar	Won	
Karnataka State Film Awards	Best Dubbing Artist (Male)	Sudarshan	Won	
Filmfare Awards South	Best Film – Kannada	Syed Aman Bachchan, M. S. Ravindra	Won	
Filmfare Awards South	Best Director – Kannada	K. M. Chaitanya	Won	
Filmfare Awards South	Best Supporting Actor – Kannada	Sharath Lohitashwa	Won	
Kanfida Film Awards	Best Debutant Director	K. M. Chaitanya	Won	
Kanfida Film Awards	Best Dialogues	Agni Shridhar	Won	
Udaya Film Awards	Best Actor	Chetan Kumar	Won	
Udaya Film Awards	Best Supporting Actor	Sharath Lohitashwa	Won	
Udaya Film Awards	Best Dialogues	Agni Shridhar	Won	
Kasturi Film Awards	Best Supporting Actor	Sharath Lohitashwa	Won	
Suvarna Film Awards	Best Story	Agni Shridhar	Won	
Mysore Minerals Film Awards	Best Supporting actor	Sharath Lohitashwa	Won	
South Indian Cinematographers' Association (SICA) Awards	Best Debutant Director	K. M. Chaitanya	Won	
Chennai Film Fans Association Awards	Best Debutant Director	K. M. Chaitanya	Won	
Chennai Film Fans Association Awards	Best Actor	Sharath Lohitashwa	Won	

== DVD ==
The DVD of the movie has been released on Anand Audio. This is the first time a Kannada movie with 5.1 surround sound is releasing on a DVD.

== Box office ==
The film has been completed 100-days in Bangalore region.

== See also ==
- List of crime films
- India Mafia
