= Shwetha Srivatsav =

Indian actress

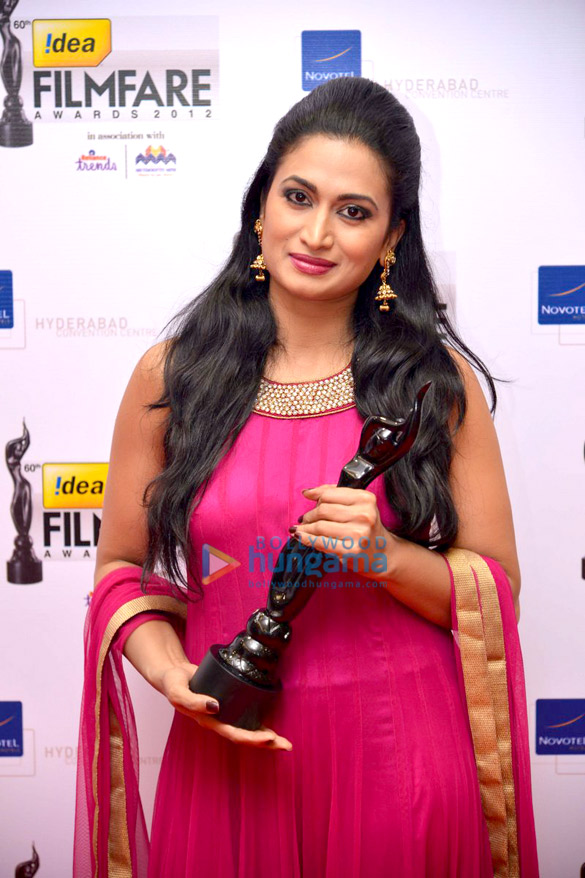
- Shweta at 60th Filmfare Awards South event
- Born: Shwetha Srivatsav; Karnataka, India
- Occupation: Actress
- Years active: 2000–present
- Spouse: Amith Srivatsav (m. 2020)

Shwetha Srivatsav is an Indian actress, known for her work in Kannada cinema and television. She began her career in theatre, before moving to television, where she received recognition for her role in T. N. Seetharam's Manvantara. She subsequently went on to work in films. Having made her film debut with Mukha Mukhi (2006), she shot to fame with her performance in Simple Agi Ondh Love Story (2013). Her performance in Fair & Lovely (2014) won her the Filmfare Award South for Best Actress.

== Career ==
Shwetha took part in a theatre workshop conducted by B. V. Karanth, circa 1997, when she was in class six. She was later cast in the television soap Jwalamukhi, directed by T. N. Seetharam. Shwetha subsequently went on to appear in many telefilms and teleplays before being cast in Seetharam's Manvantara.

After appearing in a host of plays and television projects, Shwetha made her film acting debut in a parallel film Mukha Mukhi (2006). She appeared in a small role in the gangster film Aa Dinagalu (2007) before taking up a lead role in the film Cyber Yugadol Nava Yuva Madhura Prema Kavyam (2012). She won the Filmfare Best Female Debut award for her performance in the film. Following this, she featured in the much acclaimed blockbuster film Simple Agi Ondh Love Story (2013) which earned her wide appreciation for her portrayal of a bubbly girl character and her dialogue delivery. She was in the 2014 film Fair & Lovely, in which she played the character of a sex worker opposite to Prem, a role for which she won the Filmfare Award for Best Actress – Kannada. She has announced a Telugu film "Bommala Ramaram" with a debutant director. She was in the 2016 film Kiragoorina Gayyaligalu, with a story based on the novel with the same name by the well-known writer Poornachandra Tejaswi and directed by Sumana Kittur. Shwetha also became the brand ambassador of an international fashion company "Shinayele".

After taking three years of her maternity break from not doing films she signed her first film in 2019 titled as Rahadhari. It is directed by Girish Vairamudi where she will be essaying the role of a cop.

== Personal life ==
Shwetha's father L. Krishnappa was a theatre artist. She began her schooling at New Cambridge English School in Vijayanagar, Bangalore and completed high school education at Vidya Peeta, graduation from Christ College and obtained a master's degree in mass communication from Central College, all in Bangalore.

Shwetha met Amith Srivatsav during the making of the telefilm Lakshmi Kataksha. After four years of courtship, they married in 2020. They have a daughter together (born 2023).

== Filmography ==
Key
†	Denotes films that have not yet been released

Year	Film	Role	Notes
2006	Mukha Mukhi	Vasu	
2007	Aa Dinagalu	Kothwal's wife	
2012	Cyber Yugadol Nava Yuva Madhura Prema Kavyam	Sneha	Debut as lead
2013	Simple Agi Ondh Love Story	Khushi	
2014	Aathma Sakshi	Leena Pinto	
2014	Fair & Lovely	Bhumika	
2016	Kiragoorina Gayyaligalu	Daanamma	
2022	Hope	Shivani	
2023	Raghavendra Stores	Vyjayanthi	
2024	Ondu Sarala Prema Kathe	Herself	Cameo appearance
2024	Chikkiya Mukutti†	TBA	Filming

=== Television ===
- Nijagallinarani - A Teleplay aired on Doordarshan
- Kamali - A Telefilm aired on Doordarshan
- Lakshmi Kataksha - A Telfilm aired on ETV Kannada directed by Prema Karanth
- Jwalamukhi - A Teleserial aired on Udaya TV directed by T. N. Seetharam
- Malebillu - A Teleserial directed by T. N. Seetharam
- Manvantara - A Teleserial aired on ETV Kannada directed by T. N. Seetharam
- Silli Lalli - A Teleserial aired on ETV Kannada directed by Sihi Kahi Chandru

== Awards and nominations ==
Film	Award	Category	Result
Cyber ugadol Nava Yuva Madhura Prema Kavyam	60th Filmfare Awards South	Best Female Debut	Won
Cyber ugadol Nava Yuva Madhura Prema Kavyam	Aryabhatta Prashasthi	Best Debut Actress	Won
Simple Agi Ondh Love Story	61st Filmfare Awards South	Best Actress	Nominated
Fair & Lovely	62nd Filmfare Awards South	Best Actress	Won
Kiragoorina Gayyaligalu	64th Filmfare Awards South	Best Actress	Nominated
