= Karnataka State Film Award for Best Dubbing Artist (Male) =

Indian film award

- State award for contributions to Kannada cinema
- Sponsored by: Government of Karnataka
- Rewards: Silver Medal; ₹10,000
- First award: 2004–05
- Final award: 2010–11
- Most recent winner: Sringeri Ramanna

Highlights
- Total awarded: 7
- First winner: Shivamurthy

The Karnataka State Film Award for Best Dubbing Artist (Male) is one of the Karnataka State Film Awards in India. It has been presented annually since 2005 by the government of Karnataka for Kannada films.

== Winners ==
Year	Recipient	Dubbed For (Artist)	Film	Refs.
2004–05	Shivamurthy		Katheyaada Kaala	
2005–06	Ravindranath		Dr. B. R. Ambedkar	
2006–07	Murali	Rahul Dev	Soundarya	
2007–08	Sudarshan	Ashish Vidyarthi	Aa Dinagalu	
2008–09	Ravindranath	Bhanu Chander	Anthara Gange	
2009–10	Siddaraj Kalyankar		Banni	
2010–11	Sringeri Ramanna	A. T. Raghu	Veerabahu	
