= Raju Kannada Medium =

- Poster
- Directed by: Naresh Kumar
- Written by: Naresh Kumar
- Produced by: K. A. Suresh
- Starring: Gurunandan; Avantika Shetty; Sudeepa
- Cinematography: Shekar Chandra
- Edited by: Giri Mahesh
- Music by: Kiran Ravindranath
- Production company: Suresh Arts
- Release date: 19 January 2018
- Running time: 132 minutes
- Country: India
- Language: Kannada

Raju Kannada Medium is a 2018 Indian Kannada-language romantic comedy film written and directed by Naresh Kumar. It features Gurunandan and Avantika Shetty in the lead roles. Achyuth Kumar, Suchendra Prasad, Sadhu Kokila and the Russian model Angelina Desedina play the supporting roles. The score and soundtrack for the film is by Kiran Ravindranath and the cinematography is by Shekhar Chandra.

The film was earlier titled as Raju Rangitaranga owing to the combination of the lead pair who found success with their earlier films 1st Rank Raju and RangiTaranga respectively. The project marks the second collaboration of director Naresh Kumar, actor Gurunandan, and music director Kiran Ravindranath after their previous successful film 1st Rank Raju. The principal photography started in July 2016 in Bangalore. The filming is also held at Ooty. The film was released on 19 January 2018

== Cast ==
- Gurunandan as Raju
- Avantika Shetty as Nisha
- Sudeepa as Deepak Chakravarthy, extended cameo appearance
- Ashika Ranganath as vidya
- Achyuth Kumar
- Suchendra Prasad
- Sadhu Kokila
- Vinayak Joshi
- Angelina Desedina
- Chandana Raghavendra
- Kuri Prathap
- Pratham in a guest appearance
- Kirik Keerthi in a guest appearance
- Chandan Shetty in a guest appearance
- Om Prakash Rao in a guest appearance

== Soundtrack ==
Raju Kannada Medium

Soundtrack album by Kiran Ravindranath
- Released: 2017
- Recorded: 2017
- Genre: Feature film soundtrack
- Length: 19:41
- Language: Kannada
- Label: Ananda Audio
- Producer: Kiran Ravindranath

The film's background score and the soundtracks are composed by Kiran Ravindranath. The music rights were acquired by Ananda Audio.

Track-List
No.	Title	Lyrics	Singer(s)	Length
1.	"Kodeyondara Adiyalli"	Hrudaya Shiva	Sonu Nigam	3:24
2.	"Seeda Saada"	Hrudaya Shiva	Rap Smokey, Tippu	2:58
3.	"Nentru Bartarey"	Chandan Shetty	Chandan Shetty	2:46
4.	"Kannerali"	Hrudaya Shiva	Anuradha Bhat, Vijay Prakash	3:43
5.	"Ekangi Haadinali"	Hrudaya Shiva	Sonu Nigam	3:04
6.	"Marula Neenu"	Jayanth kaikini	Shreya Ghoshal	3:46
Total length:				19:41

== Release ==
The film released on 19 January 2018.

=== Critical reception ===
Movie has got mixed review from the movie Critics. Sunayana Suresh of The Times of India scored the film at 2.5 out of 5 stars and wrote The film has some good cinematography. The songs too are catchy. One wishes the film could have utilized the same better. Sudeep's cameo is quite crucial plot, but the filmmaker has chosen to add a lot of extra twists. Manoj Kumar R of The Indian Express gave the film a rating of 2.5/5 and wrote The film could have been much better if only Naresh had the will to swim against the tide. S Sivaraman of The Hindu stated Raju Kannada Medium is a huge flop. The director simply doesn’t know how to take the rudderless plot forward.
