= Kiragoorina Gayyaligalu =

- Film poster
- Directed by: D. Sumana Kittur
- Written by: Poornachandra Tejaswi
- Screenplay by: Agni Shridhar
- Based on: Kiragoorina Gayyaligalu by Poornachandra Tejaswi
- Produced by: Syed Aman Bachchan; M. S. Ravindra
- Starring: Shwetha Srivatsav; Sukrutha Wagle; Karunya Ram; Sonu
- Cinematography: Manohar Joshi
- Edited by: Suresh Urs
- Music by: Sadhu Kokila
- Production company: Megha Movies
- Release date: 11 March 2016
- Running time: 139 minutes
- Country: India
- Language: Kannada
- Box office: ₹10 crore

Kiragoorina Gayyaligalu transl. Rowdy women of Kiragooru) is a 2016 Indian Kannada-language drama film directed by Sumana Kittur, based on a novel of the same name written by Poornachandra Tejaswi. It stars Shwetha Srivatsav, Sukrutha Wagle, Karunya Ram, Sonu, and Manasa Joshi in the lead roles. The supporting cast features Achyuth Kumar, Kishore, Sharath Lohitashwa

== Cast ==
- Shwetha Srivatsav as Daanamma
- Sukrutha Wagle as Kaali
- Karunya Ram as Bhagya
- Sampath Kumar
- Yogesh as Sones
- Ajay Raj as Razak
- Kishore as Kalegowda
- Sonu as Nagamma
- Achyuth Kumar as Shankara
- Sharath Lohitashwa as Heggade
- Sundar as Bhairappa
- S. Narayan as Dr. Annappa
- Girija Lokesh as Eravva
- Prakash Belawadi as Government Officer
- B. Jayashree as folk singer
- Manasa Joshi as Rudri
- Lakshmi Chandrashekar as Bhairappa’s mother
- Ravishankar Gowda as thief in jail
- Anantha Velu as Seege gowda
- Rahul Madhav as Subbaiah
- Nikhil Manju as Maara
- Shantha Acharya as Bhairappa’s wife
- Shobaraj as S. Mahalingaiah
- Mandya Ramesh as Constable Narayana
- Dharma as Malayali Pandith
- KSDL Chandru as Constable
- Praveen Tej

== Production ==
=== Development ===
Sumana Kittur, an admirer of writer Poornachandra Tejaswi's works, said his work Kiragoorina Gayyaligalu stood out for her, as it was set in a village backdrop, that she associated to, having had the same origins. She approached Rajeswari Tejaswi, Poornachandra Tejaswi's wife, for the copyrights to adapt the novella into a film. Following this, she announced of the film in January 2015.

=== Casting ===
"I had much work to do for this film and most importantly, I had to get the accent and body language right, which was straining. All said, I am glad; I was doing a good film and did it out of passion."

— Shwetha Srivatsav, regarding her work in the film.

Kittur announced that the lead role of Daanamma would be played by Shwetha Srivatsav, and that Achyuth Kumar would appear in a pivotal role. It was revealed in March 2015 that Sukrutha Wagle, Sonu, Kishore and Manasa Joshi would play other lead. Sharath Lohitashwa would play supporting roles, and that Yogesh would appear in an important role in the film. On casting Srivatsav in the lead role, she said, "She has not been exposed to too many films. So, I thought that she would appear fresh in this particular role. Also, she had already read the novel, when I approached her and all she asked me was whether she would be playing the character of Daanamma". The casting of Karunya Ram and Manasa Joshi were confirmed in April 2015. Writer Agni Shridhar, who had previously collaborated with Kittur in Edegarike (2012), was chosen to work on the film's screenplay and dialogues. Speaking on the subject of the film, Kittur said the film was "heroine-oriented" and that it would "depict the lives of girls in villages." Speaking to The Indian Express during its post-production stages, Shridhar said, "[T]he film is a mirror of the women folk of any village in India but does not talk about feminism, neither in the story nor through the characters. But the feminist theme Sumana has portrayed would be the answer to the people in all fields, including politics".

=== Filming ===
Pre-production work of the film began in April 2015. Reports said, prior to the beginning of filming, in preparation for her role, Srivatsav took to villages in Karnataka to get a hold of the village dialect and understand the way of living. To resemble the village with environs of Kiragooru as depicted by Tejaswi in his novella, the makers scouted over 50 villages in areas surrounding and in Bangalore and Mysore in Karnataka before zeroing on three villages in Kanakapura of Ramanagara district — Doddabadkere, Goluru and Chikkanawalase — villages close to Bangalore, making the team easier to traverse between them and the latter. Significant portions were also shot in Harohalli in Mysore district.
