= Kaasina Sara =

2023 Indian Kannada-language film

- Poster
- Directed by: N R Nanjunde Gowda
- Produced by: E Dodda Nagaiah
- Starring: Vijay Raghavendra; Harshika Poonacha
- Cinematography: H. C. Venugopal
- Edited by: Suresh Urs
- Music by: V. Sridhar
- Release date: 3 March 2023
- Country: India
- Language: Kannada

Kaasina Sara is a 2023 Indian Kannada-language film directed by N R Nanjunde Gowda and produced by E Dodda Nagaiah under Native Creations. It stars Vijay Raghavendra and Harshika Poonacha. The film was released theatrically on 3 March 2023.

== Cast ==
- Vijay Raghavendra as Sundaresh
- Harshika Poonacha as Sampige
- Umashree
- Ninasam Ashwath
- Sangeetha
- Sudha Belawadi
- Hanumanthe Gowda
- Mandya Ramesh

== Production ==
=== Development ===
In August 2022, it was announced that N R Nanjunde Gowda (Hebbatt Ramakka fame) and Vijay Raghavendra would team up for a film tentatively titled "Kaasina Sara" under the production of Native Creations.

=== Filming ===
Principal photography of the film commenced on 4 August 2022 and On 24 September 2022, entire shooting of the film has been wrapped up.

== Soundtrack ==
Kaasina Sara

Soundtrack album by V. Sridhar
- Released: 2023
- Recorded: 2022
- Genre: Feature film soundtrack
- Length: 11:24
- Language: Kannada

Official audio
- Kaasina Sara - Full Album on YouTube

The soundtrack of the audio was released on 4 February 2023. composed by V. Sridhar.

No.	Title	Lyrics	Artist(s)	Length
1.	"Bharaneeya Male Hoydu"	S G Siddaramaiah	Kailash Kher, Arundhathi Vasishta	3:56
2.	"Bhoothayiya Kasina Sara"	S G Siddaramaiah	M. D. Pallavi, V. Sridhar	3:53
3.	"Seemantha Seemantha"	J M Prahlad	Anuradha Bhat, Sadwini Koppa, Vasushree Halemane, Prithwi Bhat, Vihan Arya	4:15
Total length:				11:24

== Reception ==
=== Critical response ===
Sridevi S of The Times of India wrote "However, the film has an important message for the youth. But one needs to wait and watch how it is accepted by the audience". Avinash G. Ram of Vijaya Karnataka says "The overall theme of the movie is that if farmers change, everything changes. Although Kasina Sara is a rural movie, it looks very relevant today. Nanjundegowda also explains very well how important sustainable agriculture is for today's generation". A reviewer of Asianet News wrote "A love story also arises in the village for an educated farmer. Actor Vijay Raghavendra attracts attention with his natural acting as always. Harshika Poonachcha is as good as her character". Y Maheswara Reddy from Bangalore Mirror wrote "Cinematographer HC Venu has worked well behind the camera to capture the greenery in rural areas. Dialogues written by SG Siddaramaiah are good. All in all, it is worth a watch by the whole family". A Critic from Udayavani says "The plus point of this movie is the environment that complements the story. Vijay Raghavendra shines as a young farmer and Harshika Poonachcha fits the role and likes it".
