= Marakastra =

- Theatrical release poster
- Directed by: Gurumurthy Sunami
- Screenplay by: Gurumurthy Sunami
- Story by: Atharv Vijay
- Produced by: Komala Nataraaja
- Starring: Malashri; Ayyappa P. Sharma; Harshika Poonacha
- Cinematography: Dhana Kumar K Arun Suresh
- Edited by: N.M Vishwa
- Music by: Songs: Manju Kavi; Score: Sathish Babu
- Release date: 13 October 2023
- Running time: 156 minutes
- Country: India
- Language: Kannada

Marakastra is a 2023 Indian Kannada-language action suspense thriller film written and directed by Gurumurthy Sunami and produced by Komala Nataraaja. The film stars Malashri in the lead role. The music is composed by Manju Kavi, the cinematography by Dhana Kumar K, and Arun Suresh, and the editing is handled by N.M Vishwa.

== Cast ==
- Malashri as Janhavi
- Ayyappa P. Sharma
- Harshika Poonacha as Nandini
- Ugramm Manju
- Anand Aarya
- Mico Nagaraj as MLA Muddurama
- Dhanakumar as Shankar

== Soundtrack ==
Marakastra

Soundtrack album by Manju Kavi
- Released: 2023
- Recorded: 2023
- Genre: Feature film soundtrack
- Language: Kannada
- Label: A2 Music

Official audio
- Marakastra - Album on YouTube

The music of the film is composed by Manju Kavi Parashar and released under A2 Music.

== Reception ==
Vinay Lokesh, a reviewer for The Times of India, gave the film a rating of 2/5. In his review, he describes the film's plot, which revolves around a professor named Shankar, who is a well-intentioned man advising his students to work in India for the country's benefit. The city experiences a series of high-profile murders, including those of a lawyer, a police officer, the deputy commissioner, and even Shankar's own daughters, which disrupt his otherwise normal life. Lokesh's review suggests that "Marakastra" aims to be a commercial, action-oriented drama. However, he expresses disappointment with the film, describing it as an uphill task to watch. He points out serious disconnects between the subplots in the story, which he believes contribute to the film's downfall. The action sequences are described as forced, and the songs further distract from the detached storyline.
