= Missing Boy =

Indian Kannada-language adventure drama film

- Theatrical release poster
- Directed by: Raghuram
- Produced by: Kolla Praveen; Kolla Mahesh; R K Hemanth Kumar
- Starring: Gurunandan
- Music by: V. Harikrishna
- Production company: Kolla Entertainments
- Release date: 22 March 2019
- Country: India
- Language: Kannada

Missing Boy is a 2019 Indian Kannada-language adventure drama film starring Gurunandan in the titular role. The film follows a missing boy from Hubbali.

== Cast ==
- Gurunandan as Nishchay Jagadish
- Rangayana Raghu as Lavakumar
- Archana Jayakrishnan
- Ravishankar Gowda
- Shobhraj
- Jai Jagadish
- Vijayalakshmi Singh
- Sumithra
- Yamuna Srinidhi
- Bhagirathi Kadam

== Production ==
Since the film begins in Europe, the first twenty minutes of the film are in English. Archana Jayakrishnan made her debut with this film. The film was shot in New Zealand and Karnataka.

== Soundtrack ==
The songs are composed by V. Harikrishna.

- "Jopana" - Vaani Harikrishna, Vijay Prakash

== Reception ==
A critic from The Times of India wrote that "Missing Boy is a film for those who love their family dramas replete with emotions". A critic from Cinema Express wrote that "Overall, Missing Boy paints a realistic, poignant picture of a real-life story and is a film that will surely touch your heart". A critic from Bangalore Mirror wrote that "Missing Boy is a step in the right direction for Sandalwood". A critic from Deccan Chronicle wrote that "It stands out for its values which is the driving force than the only intent to find out about the missing parents".
