= Srusti (film) =

Indian Kannada-language romantic drama film

- VCD cover
- Directed by: Basavaraj
- Written by: Basavaraj
- Produced by: P Kumaraswamy; Sri Pathikonda Shankar Shetty (presents)
- Starring: Nagendra Prasad; Vinod Prabhakar; Priyadarshini
- Cinematography: Suredranath Begur
- Edited by: Basavaraj Urs
- Music by: S. A. Rajkumar
- Production company: Sri Naga Art Productions
- Release date: 20 October 2004
- Country: India
- Language: Kannada

Srusti is a 2004 Indian Kannada-language romantic drama film directed by Basavaraj and starring Nagendra Prasad, Vinod Prabhakar and Priyadarshini.

== Cast ==
- Nagendra Prasad as Sandesh
- Vinod Prabhakar as Santosh
- Priyadarshini as Srushti
- Ashok
- Sihi Kahi Chandru
- Sarigama Viji
- Dingri Nagaraj
- Chitra Shenoy
- Roopa Hasan
- Jayalakshmi
- Ramji - special appearance in song "Kuruma Kuruma"

== Production ==
Srusti is based on a true incident that a friend informed him about and marked Vinod Prabhakar's foray into the romantic genre from the action genre. The film was produced by P Kumaraswamy, a theatre owner from Hospet and was in production for a year and a half since the film exceeded its budget. Srusti was shot in many outdoor locations in Bengaluru and the Kalagooru tea estate in Chikkamagaluru.

== Soundtrack ==
The music was composed by S. A. Rajkumar. The lyrics were written by R. N. Jayagopal, Bhangeeranga, V. Manohar, and K. Kalyan. S. P. Balasubrahmanyam won the Karnataka State Film Award for Best Male Playback Singer for "Hrudayada Thumba", which Rajkumar reused from "Ithuvarai Yarum" from Kadhaludan (2003). The song "Kenneli Thuntu" is based on "Vachindi Palapitta" from Kalisundam Raa.

- "Kuruma Kuruma"
- "Ba Ba Baby"
- "Premada Hoove" - S. P. Balasubrahmanyam, K. S. Chithra
- "Kenneli Thuntu Guli" - Hemanth Kumar
- "Hrudayada Thumba" - S. P. Balasubrahmanyam

== Reception ==
A critic from Sify wrote, "Debutant director Basavaraj, an engineering graduate has the adequate stuff but fails to make the film convincing and racy. The highlights of this triangular love story are good cinematography from Surendranath Begur and a few melodious tunes from S. A. Rajkumar".
