= Harshika Poonacha =

Indian actress

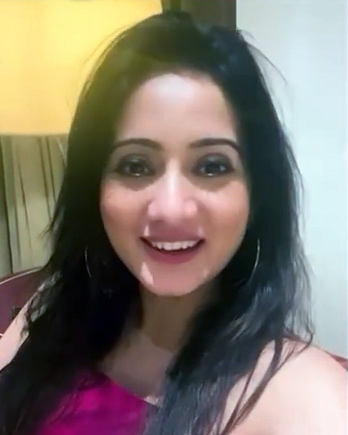
- Harshika Poonacha in 2020
- Born: Ammathi, Kodagu, Karnataka, India
- Education: Bachelors in Engineering
- Occupation: Actress
- Years active: 2008–present
- Spouse: Bhuvann Ponnannaa (m. 2023)
- Children: 1

Harshika Poonacha is an Indian actress who mainly works in Kannada films. She rose to fame with the 2008 Kannada film PUC.

== Career ==
Harshika Poonacha started her career at the age of 15 by acting in PUC (2008 Kannada film) while she was doing her 12th Standard at Christ Junior College, Bangalore. After completing 12th standard, Harshika spent the next two months working as a television anchor by hosting shows like Nimmindha Nimagaagi, Hrudayadinda and Sarigamapa before beginning a professional course. Harshika then joined Cambridge Institute of Technology, Bangalore and completed her Bachelor of Engineering in Electrical. In 2012, she joined Maxpro Software Company and agreed to work for five days a month while working 21 days in films. She said Getting into films was an accident. I never dreamt of becoming an actress.

After PUC (2008 Kannada film), she acted in a Kodava language film Ponnamma, a Konkani film Kazar and a Telugu film Edukondalavada Venkataramana Andaru Bagundali. In 2010, Harshika acted in an important role in Jackie with Puneeth Rajkumar, which catapulted her to an instant celebrity status. She later appeared in Thamassu with Shiva Rajkumar for which she won the Karnataka State Film Award for Best Supporting Actress, and played Ramya in Nariya Seere Kadha, in which Ravichandran played the lead role. She also acted in a film named Cycle opposite Shivarjun. She played the daughter of a crorepati who gets kidnapped for ransom in the comedy film 5 Idiots. In 2013, she first had two releases in a row, Cycle and Ale and her third release Managana Kaili Maanikya opposite Ramesh Aravind, which was her first comedy film, in July. Her two films, B3 a love story directed by Gana Shyam with Srikanth and Adwaitha an action-based film directed by MB Giriraj which has Ajay Rao in the lead, released both on 6 December.

She has signed her first Tamil film Anandha Thollai. She also has a Telugu film titled Panipuri coming up.

She also appeared in a video album Hoo Manase. She and her cousin Bhuvaan Ponannaa own a company called Glamgod Fashion and Events and conduct fashion shows and fashion weeks. She made her Bhojpuri debut from the film Hum Hai Raahi Pyar Ke with Pawan Singh in 2021.

== Personal life ==
Harshika was born in Ammathi, Kodagu district of Karnataka and is the only daughter to Uddappanda Poonacha and Shambhavi. She is the elder sister of actress Thapaswini Poonacha. She married actor Bhuvann Ponnannaa in 2023. In April 2024, the couple were victims of mob violence in Bengaluru. The incident was reported to the Commissioner of Police.

== Filmography ==
Year	Film	Role	Notes
2008	PUC	Gowri	
2009	Ponnamma		Kodava film
2009	Kazar		Konkani film
2009	Edukondalavada Venkataramana Andaru Bagundali		Telugu film
2010	Sugreeva		
2010	Thamassu	Amreen Sabha	Karnataka State Film Award for Best Supporting Actress
2010	Jackie	Yashodha	Suvarna Award for Best Supporting Actress; Nominated, Filmfare Award for Best Supporting Actress – Kannada
2010	Jugaari		
2010	Naariya Seere Kadda	Ramya	
2011	5 Idiots	Sheetal	
2011	Murali Meets Meera	Shwetha	
2011	Krishnan Marriage Story	Prospective bride	Cameo
2012	Ko Ko	Ganga	
2012	Parie	Sumedha	
2012	Crazy Loka	Chandini	
2013	Cycle		
2013	Ale	Geetha	
2013	Mangana Kaiyalli Manikya	Manohar's fiancé	
2013	Case No. 18/9		Special appearance
2013	Advaitha	Ambika	
2013	B3	Anu	
2014	Maryade		
2016	Bhale Jodi	Ramya	
2016	...Re	Parvathi	
2016	Beat		
2016	Appudala Ippudila		Telugu film
2017	Upendra Matte Baa		Nominated, SIIMA Award for Best Actor in a Supporting Role (Female) – Kannada
2018	Charminar	Nanda	Malayalam film
2018	Chitte		
2019	Udgharsha		
2021	Hum Hai Raahi Pyar Ke		Bhojpuri film
2023	Kaasina Sara	Sampige	
2023	Sthabda	Indu	
2023	Bera		
2023	Marakastra	Nandini	
