= Kallara Santhe =

2009 Indian film by Sumana Kittur

- CD Cover
- Directed by: Sumana Kittur
- Written by: Agni Sridhar
- Produced by: Ravindra; Syed Aman Bachchan
- Starring: Yash; Hariprriya
- Cinematography: Sundarnath Suvarna
- Edited by: S. K. Nagendra Urs
- Music by: V. Manohar
- Production company: Megha Movies
- Release date: 18 December 2009
- Country: India
- Language: Kannada

Kalara Santhe is a 2009 Indian Kannada-language action drama film directed by Sumana Kittur. The film features Yash, Hariprriya in the lead roles. The film revolves around a young man who is let down by the system decides to commit suicide. When the news spreads to the media and the government, he undergoes a life-changing event.

== Cast ==
- Yash as Somu
- Hariprriya as Roopa
- Rangayana Raghu as the chief minister
- Kishore
- Shobharaj
- Jai Jagadish
- Sudha Belawadi
- Adi Lokesh
- Sudharani as an IT professional
- Sumithra
- Rajesh Nataranga

== Soundtrack ==
Kallara Santhe

Soundtrack album by V. Manohar
- Genre: Film soundtrack
- Length: 23:18
- Label: Anand Audio

The soundtrack was composed by V. Manohar.

Track listing
No.	Title	Lyrics	Singer(s)	Length
1.	"Kallara Katheya"	V. Manohar	Rajesh Krishnan	4:23
2.	"Maribeku"	V. Manohar	Rajesh Krishnan, Shamitha Malnad	3:51
3.	"Kaapadi Kaapadi"	V. Manohar	Gurukiran. B. K. Mohan	3:26
4.	"Kaledu Hoda"	D. Sumana Kiththur	Rajesh Krishnan, Nanditha	5:06
5.	"Thutthoori"	G. P. Rajaratnam	Rajesh Krishnan, Baby Prakruthi	4:21
6.	"Chappale Chappale"	V. Manohar	Gurukiran	2:11

== Reception ==
A critic from The Times of India gave the film a rating of 3 1/2 out of five stars writing that "A good show by director D Sumana Kittur who gives a comical twist to a political satire with lively narration and apt sequences". A critic from Deccan Herald stated that "Yash and Haripriya make a good pair on the screen. Rangayana Raghu does justice to the role. Manohar’s music is refreshing. R. G. Vijayasarathy of Rediff.com wrote that "Kallara Sante does not have much entertaining but it is still a watchable film for politically-conscious movie fans". A critic from The New Indian Express wrote "Yash has tried hard to perform well while Haripriya is charming. She has improved a lot in dialogue delivery. The scene where she tells Yash to ask the chief minister to provide 60x40 BDA site, 20 acres of agricultural land and Rs 20 lakh is a treat to watch. Kishore has played a different kind of character. Had the director and the scriptwriter taken more care to make the screenplay crisp, the film might have been at par with Aa Dinagalu".

== Awards and nominations ==
Karnataka State Film Awards

- Best Cinematographer ... Sundaranatha Suvarna
- Special Jury Award ... Sumana Kittur

Filmfare Awards

- Nominated - Filmfare Award for Best Actress - Kannada - Hariprriya
