= Thamassu =

2010 Indian film by Agni Shridhar

Tamassu
- Film poster
- Directed by: Agni Shridhar
- Written by: Agni Shridhar
- Screenplay by: Agni Shridhar
- Produced by: Syed Aman Bachchan; M. S. Ravindra
- Starring: Shiva Rajkumar; Padmapriya; Nassar
- Cinematography: Sundarnath Suvarna
- Edited by: S. K. Nagendra Urs
- Music by: Sandeep Chowta
- Production company: Megha Movies
- Release date: 11 June 2010
- Running time: 131 minutes
- Country: India
- Language: Kannada

Thamassu (transl. Darkness) is a 2010 Indian Kannada-language film written and directed by journalist Agni Shridhar, starring Shiva Rajkumar and Padmapriya. The movie was released on 11 June 2010 and received extremely positive reviews. The story was inspired by a Hindu-Muslim incident in the aftermath of the 2002 Gujarat communal riots.

== Cast ==
- Shiva Rajkumar as ACP Shankar
- Padmapriya Janakiraman as Dr. Shanti
- Nassar as Nasser Khan
- Harshika Poonacha as Amrin Sabha
- Jai Jagadish as Commissioner of Police
- Shobhraj as legislator
- Sharath Lohithaswa as Mastan, legislator
- Aasif Kshathriya as DCP Khan
- Nagaraj Murthy as Gowda, legislator
- Baby Madhu Karanth as Bharathi
- Sudha Belawadi as Salma
- Abhishek S. N. as Roshan
- Sathya as Sardar
- Ravikanth as Kalandar
- Sudha Rani as Munawar's mother (cameo)
- Yash as Imran (cameo)

== Production ==
Thamassu started its shooting at Kanteerava Studios on 23 October 2009. It was shot in and around Bangalore.

== Music ==
The music was scored by Sandeep Chowta with lyrics penned by Agni Shridhar and Ramya.

No.	Title	Singer(s)	Length
1.	"Karagadiru"	Roop Kumar Rathod
2.	"Maar Maar"	Nakash Aziz
3.	"Nannanena"	Shaan, Sowmya Raoh
4.	"Nodu Baare"	Master Saleem, Neha Kakkar
5.	"Tamassu"	Neha Kakkar

== Reception ==
=== Critical response ===
Shruti Indira Lakshminarayana of Rediff scored the film at 3 out of 5 stars and says "Sandeep Chowta's music and Ramya and Agni Shridhar's lyrics go hand in hand, but a few songs could have been done away with. The cinematography also stands out in some scenes. Thamassu is a film that makes you think". A critic from The Times of India scored the film at 4 out of 5 stars and wrote "Sharath Lohithashwa is excellent. While Sundaranatha Suvarna is brilliant in camera work, Sandeep Chowta is equally good as a music director. Ramya Sridhar makes her debut as a lady lyricist by penning three songs. It's a movie for the class and the mass". B S Srivani from Deccan Herald wrote "Shivanna and Padmapriya offers some freshness but only that. Harshikaa impresses with an improved and restrained performance. Asif, Jai Jagadish, Nasser, Sharath Lohitashwa are all aptly cast. Sandeep Chowta, Nrutanrutya and the art department have worked hard to translate their director’s vision, which cannot escape loopholes. "Tamassu" may disappoint the average Shivanna "abhimani" but is a better product from a 'debutant' director" A critic from Bangalore Mirror wrote "The background music is loud and hampers a decent sleep while watching the film. The camerawork is better than most other aspects of the film. Sukadhare’s break from filmmaking has not worked for him or the audience".

== Awards ==
On 25 October Karnataka State Film Awards for the year 2010-11 adjudged Thamassu as the second best film. Award consists of cash prize Rs 75,000 and 100 gram silver medal each for director and producer.

Shivrajkumar won Filmfare Award for Best Actor for his performance in the film.

The Movie also received two awards for individual performances. Best supporting actress and Best screenplay writer done by Harshika Poonacha and Agni Shridhar respectively.
