= Ammathi =

- village
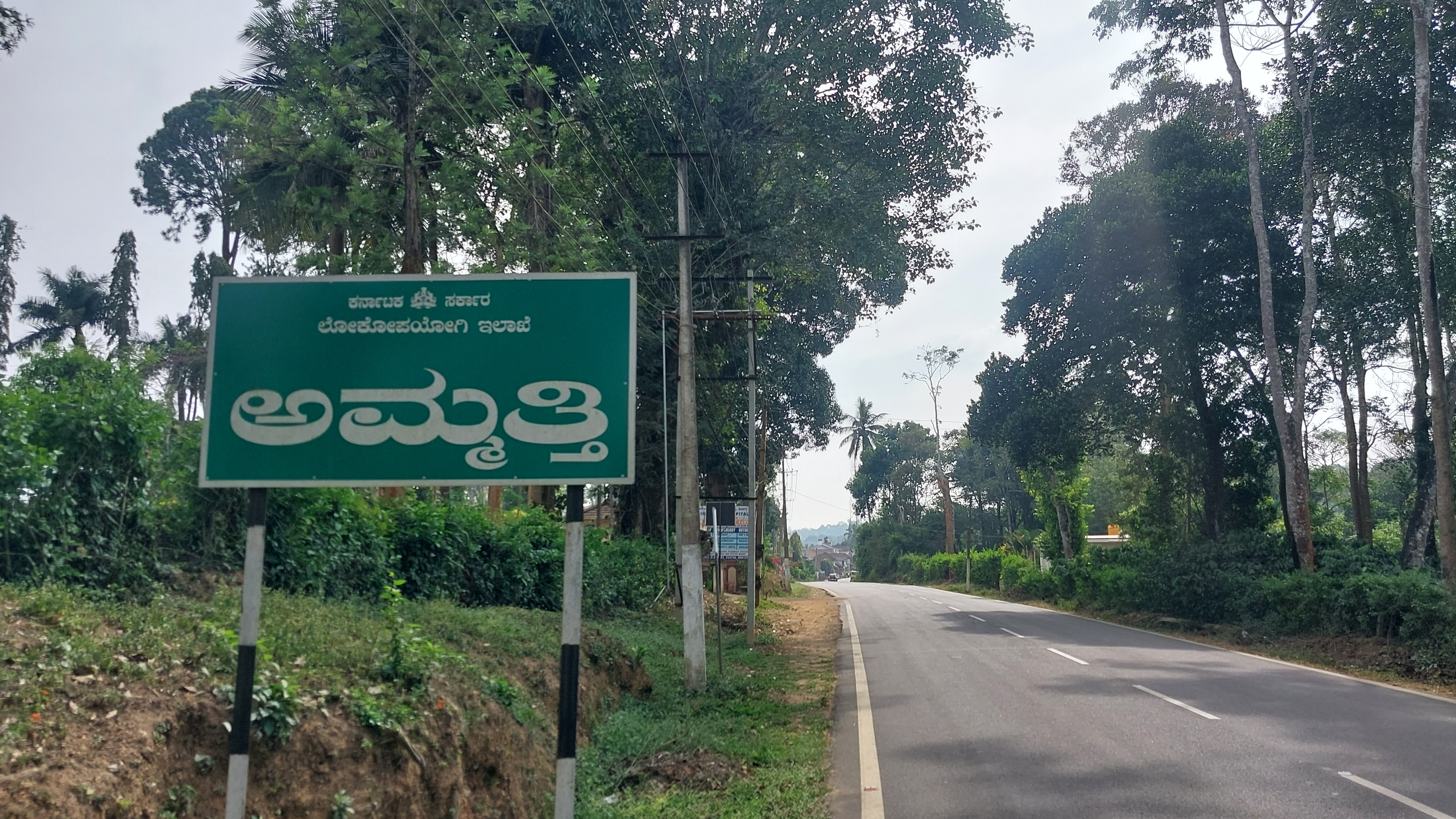
- Ammathi welcome sign

- Location in Karnataka, India Ammathi (India)
- Coordinates: 12.24440°N 75.85854°E
- Country: India
- State: Karnataka
- District: Kodagu
- Talukas: Virajpet

Government
  - Body: Village Panchayat

Languages =Kodava Tak(Coorgi)
  - Official: Kannada
- Time zone: UTC+5:30 (IST)
- Postal code: 571211
- ISO 3166 code: IN-KA 12
- Vehicle registration: KA-12
- Nearest city: Virajpet
- Civic agency: Village Panchayat
- Website: kodagu.nic.in

Ammathi is a village in Virajpet taluk, Kodagu district of Karnataka state in India.

== Ammathi ==
Ammathi is a village located between Siddapura and Virajpet towns of Kodagu district.

== Demographics ==
The people of this town speak Kodava, Kannada and Malayalam.
