= Cyber Yugadol Nava Yuva Madhura Prema Kavyam =

Indian Kannada-language film

- Directed by: Madhuchandra
- Produced by: Ashwin Vijaykumar
- Starring: Gurunandan; Shwetha Srivatsav
- Cinematography: Manohar Joshi
- Edited by: Jeevan
- Music by: Vasu Dixit
- Release date: 21 September 2012
- Country: India
- Language: Kannada

Cyber Yugadol Nava Yuva Madhura Prema Kavyam is a 2012 Indian Kannada-language film directed by Madhuchandra starring Gurunandan and Shwetha Srivatsav in lead roles.

== Plot ==
The film follows the story of a college student named Jayantha (played by Gurunandan) who falls in love with his classmate Sneha (played by Shwetha Srivatsav). Whether or not Jayantha and Sneha survive the hurdles posed by an incident involving their friends and Vishwa, Sneha's brother, forms the rest of the story.

== Cast ==
- Gurunandan as Jayantha
- Shwetha Srivatsav as Sneha
- Sharath Lohithaswa
- Veena Sundar
- Achyuth Kumar
- Sundar
- Nanjunda
- Seetha Kote
- Kiranmayi
- Manojav as Vishwa

== Music ==
Cyber Yugadol Nava Yuva Madhura Prema Kavyam

Soundtrack album by Vasu Dixit
- Released: 2012
- Recorded: 2012
- Genre: Feature film soundtrack
- Length: 24:53
- Language: Kannada

Official audio
- CYNMPK - Full Album on YouTube

Track listing
No.	Title	Singer(s)	Length
1.	"Maccha"	Vasu Dixit	5:22
2.	"Maye Maye"	Chinthan Vikas, Gurupriya	5:37
3.	"Purra Purra"	Vasu Dixit	5:20
4.	"Olavemba Nadiyaagi"	Harishchandran, Bindumalini Dixit	5:33
5.	"Aalisi Hrudayada Haadanu"	Joel Dubba, Rithish Padmanabh	3:41
Total length:			24:53

== Reception ==
=== Critical response ===
A critic from The Times of India scored the film at 3 out of 5 stars and says " While Gurunandan and Shwetha Srivastav have displayed an impressive performance as love birds, Kiranmayee and Nanjunda are equally good as lovers turned couples. The highlight of the movie is music by Vasu Dixit and Abhilash Lakra. Cinematography by Manohar Joshi is superb". Srikanth Srinivasa from Rediff.com scored the film at 2 out of 5 stars and wrote "Vasu Dixit's music will go down well with young listeners. Manohar Joshi's camera work is excellent in the song picturisation and especially the number shot in Bali Islands, Indonesia. The film can be appreciated for the freshness of thought and the enthusiasm of the young team, but for nothing else". B S Srivani from Deccan Herald wrote "The director lays bare the merits and demerits of living-in before returning to ideas used in some Telugu films to revive the story. Initially weak, his dialogues secure seetis mingled with admiring gaalis. Vasu and Abhilash rev up the tempo with quirky, pleasing music. A fresher’s attempt, the film is laudable though the entire content is not palatable". Y Maheswara Reddy from DNA wrote "Sharath Lohitasva livens up the screen as well. Music directors Vasu Dixit and Abhilash Lakhra have also done a good job. The film makes a worthy watch for both youth and their parents, so go for it!".

== Awards ==
- Filmfare Award for Best Female Debut – South - Shwetha Srivatsav - Won
- SIIMA Award for Best Male Debutant - Kannada - Gurunandan - Nominated
