= Fair & Lovely (film) =

2014 Indian Kannada film directed by D. P. Raghuram

- Theatrical release poster
- Directed by: D. P. Raghuram
- Screenplay by: D. P. Raghuram
- Story by: Yathiraj
- Produced by: Shilpa Ramesh
- Starring: Prem Kumar; Shwetha Srivatsav
- Cinematography: G. S. Waali
- Edited by: Joni Harsha
- Music by: V. Harikrishna
- Production company: Jade Plant Ventures
- Release date: 24 October 2014
- Running time: 130 minutes
- Country: India
- Language: Kannada

Fair & Lovely (Phēr aṇḍ lavlī) is a 2014 Indian Kannada romance drama film written and directed by D. P. Raghuram. Produced by Shilpa Ramesh under the banner Jade Plant Ventures, the film stars Prem Kumar as Manoj and Shwetha Srivatsav as Bhumika, a sex worker, in the lead roles. Vijay Raghavendra appears in a supporting role. The music was composed by V. Harikrishna who has also made his debut as a lyricist by penning one track for the film.

The film was released on 24 October 2014, to generally positive reviews from critics, who acclaimed the film's screenplay, narration, dialogues, cinematography and the performances of the lead pair, Kumar and Shwetha Srivatsav. The latter's performance won her the Best Actress at the 62nd Filmfare Awards South.

== Cast ==
- Prem Kumar as Manoj "Manu"
- Shwetha Srivatsav as Bhumika
- Vijay Raghavendra as Abhimanyu
- Om Prakash Rao
- Anu Prabhakar
- Vishal Hegde
- Neethu
- Nakshatra
- Giri

== Production ==
=== Development ===
After the debacle of his directorial debut Cheluveye Ninne Nodalu, director Raghuram worked out on chalking out the screenplay for the story narrated by journalist Yathiraj. Upon questioning about the English-language title name for a Kannada-language film, the director mentioned that the title has both the English world "Fair" (referring to Shwetha) and the English word "Lovely" (referring to "Lovely Star" Prem). Having initially planned to name it Aparanji, he abandoned thinking it "would suit a more senior actor like Ravichandran more". Speaking of the theme of the film, he said "[It] surrounds Duddu (Money), Santhe (fair), Bili banna (fairness) and Nyaya (justice)."

=== Casting and filming ===
Prem Kumar was signed as the lead role in August 2013. Nakshatra's signing was revealed in November 2013. Raghuram however kept the signing of another actor secretive till the month of the film's release. It was revealed three days before the film's release that the actor was Vijay Raghavendra. Work on the film began in September 2013, with sound recording work having been carried out in Bangalore. Filming began on 11 October 2013.

The film was the second outing of the lead pair of Prem Kumar and Shwetha Srivatsav together, after having worked with a soap opera Manavathara. In an interview with The Times of India, Srivatsav, who plays the lead role in the film, revealed that her role in the film is of a sex worker. Talking of her preparation for the role, she said, "When I was in college, I played this role in two plays. So maybe that has helped me. Otherwise, I have watched a lot of movies. I'm a movie buff. Unintentionally, I observe the characters and maybe (I imbibed) all that body language and the way of delivering the dialogues." Speaking of his role, Kumar said, he plays "as a young man who also has a deep maturity and how he brings positivity and a ray of hope into a depressed person's life". The filming completed in early July 2014.

== Soundtrack ==
Fair & Lovely
- Soundtrack cover

Soundtrack album by V. Harikrishna
- Released: 9 July 2014
- Genre: Feature film soundtrack
- Length: 24:51
- Label: D Beats

The film's audio released was held on 9 July 2014, in Bangalore. This day coincided with the birthday of the director Raghuram. The soundtrack album consists of 6 tracks. Lyrics for the soundtracks were penned by director A. P. Arjun, music director V. Harikrishna and director Nagendra Prasad's son Anand Priya. It was earlier reported that singer Ash King had recorded one song in his voice. However, his name did not feature in the final track list.

No.	Title	Lyrics	Singer(s)	Length
1.	"Ringaagide"	A. P. Arjun	Sonu Nigam	4:35
2.	"Maaya"	Kaviraj	Santhosh Venky	4:31
3.	"Anireekshita"	Rekha Mohan	Ranjith	3:46
4.	"Haage Ondu"	V. Harikrishna	Sonu Nigam	3:55
5.	"Ee Kaanadha"	Anand Priya	V. Harikrishna	4:09
6.	"Haage Ondu"		Vijay Raghavendra, Vijayaa Shanker	3:55
Total length:				24:51

=== Critical reception ===
Reviewing the album, Kavya Christopher of The Times of India wrote, "[The songs] follow a sort of a familiar sing-song pattern that one can hum along with even when one listens to it for the first time." She added that the track "Anireekshita" stands out with its "funky tunes and pretty cool lyrics".

== Release and reception ==
The film was given the "U/A" (Parental Guidance) certificate by the censor board. It made its theatrical release on 24 October 2014, in over 100 theatres across Karnataka. Following a good run at the domestic box-office, reports said the film was set to be screened in Australia, the United States and Germany among other countries.

Upon release it received generally positive reviews from critics. The film was praised for its screenplay and performances and was criticized for its music. B. S. Srivani of Deccan Herald gave the film a rating of four out of five, and said the film has "very, very little to complain about. And deserving lots of applause." Of the film's screenplay, she wrote, "The credit belongs to actor Yatiraj upon whose story the director with dialogue writer Anandpriya builds a fine screenplay." She concluded writing praises of the acting and the camera departments. Shyam Prasad S. of Bangalore Mirror gave the film a rating of 3.5/5 wrote that its story is a "simple" one and it resembled that of Simple Agi Ondh Love Story, a 2012 film that stars Shwetha Srivatsav. He added writing praises to the lead pair, the dialogues and narration, and the cinematography. He concluded calling it a "complete film". Prakash Upadhyaya of International Business Times reviewed the film giving it a 3/5 rating and called it "A Pure Entertainer". He said the screenplay gets "full marks" and "Prem Kumar reinstates that he is growing as an actor. Shwetha does her role neatly and impresses the audience as a sex worker" and added that the music is "a big disappointment".

Writing for The Hindu, Muralidhara Khajane wrote, "... [the director has] made a ‘humble’ attempt to peep into the life of a prostitute". Of the acting performances, he wrote, "The role of Bhumika, a student of medicine, opting for prostitution, is too meek and unconvincing... Shweta looks convincing only when she attacks the male-dominated, chauvinistic society and rolls out dialogues exposing the hypocrisy of society." and added, "Raghuram makes the hero Manu (Prem Kumar) an embodiment of all virtues and makes his character flawless. Actually, it is Vijaya Raghavendra’s character as Abhimanyu, which looks more realistic than Manu. Anu Prabhakar and Nakshtra have nothing much to offer." A. Sharadhaa of The New Indian Express reviewed the film and wrote, "[The film] offers a grim portrayal of a sex worker's life through Fair & Lovely. The film reveals the cold hard truths that lurk in the life of a woman who exploits her body for financial gain." Of the lead pair's performances, she wrote, "Prem has always been pleasant to see on screen and has faithfully followed the director’s instructions. Shweta has tried to stick to the ground realities, without overdoing her act or her look." She also wrote praises of the " music scored by V Harikrishna" and criticized about the film tending to "slow down" and that "conversations cover a large part of the film."

== Accolades ==
62nd Filmfare Awards South

- Best Actress – Shwetha Srivatsav

4th South Indian International Movie Awards

- Best Director – D. P. Raghuram
