= M. D. Nataraj =

Politician in Karnataka, India

M.D. Nataraj

Karnataka Legislative Council
- In office 1978–1984

Personal details
- Born: Channapatna
- Party: Karnataka Kranti Ranga
- Other political affiliations: Indian National Congress
- Spouse: Nagaratna
- Children: 3
- Relatives: D. Devaraj Urs (father-in-law)
- Education: M.B.B S

Dr M. D. Nataraj was a politician of Karnataka state and the son-in-law of Devaraj Urs, sometime Chief Minister of Karnataka. He was also a Doctor and practiced Ayurveda.

== Family ==
Nataraj was married to Nagaratna, the second daughter of Devaraj Urs. The marriage was a love marriage and inter caste marriage: Urs was from the Arasu caste and Nataraj from the Kuruba Gowda caste. Nataraj and Nagaratna are survived by 3 children namely Suraj MN Hegde, Suhasini Satyadeep and Sudevraj MN Hegde

Nagaratna died, aged 28, after falling into a 60-foot-deep well. Her slippers were found nearby, outside the well, so it was suspected that she had committed suicide.

== Politics ==
Nataraj formed the "Indira Brigade". He was instrumental in establishing the iron grip of Devaraj Urs in state politics. Nataraj was a Member of the Legislative Council of Karnataka. 1. He was the President of INTUC of Karnataka State 2. Organising Secretary of All India INTUC 3. President of Karnataka Wrestling and Athletic Association 4. President of Karnataka State Kurubara Sangha 5. He was also an Executive Committee member and K.P.C.C. Convenor of K.P.C.C. Backward Class Cell 6. He also served as the President of the Bangalore City District Congress Committee.

His hobbies included Football, Music and cultural activities, research and Ayurvedic medicines and sidda medicines

== In popular culture ==
Raghu Mukherjee Portrayed the Nataraj character in 2022 Kannada Film Head Bush which is based on real-life character.
