= Oil Kumar =

Indian gangster

- Born: Benakanahalli Alappa Shivakumar; 1951
- Died: 20 November 1990 (aged 38–39)

Benakanahalli Alappa Shivakumar (1951 – 20 November 1990) (a.k.a. Boot House Kumar, Oil Kumar), was a ganglord and organized crime boss who headed the Bangalore underworld in the 1980s along with other notable figures such as M. P. Jayaraj and Kotwal Ramachandra. Activities include racketeering, substantial control of city's oil supply, labour unions, film distribution through his company SK Pictures in Gandhinagar, money laundering, monopolistic contract bidding and large-scale manipulation of state bureaucracy and politics. He was killed on 20 November 1990.

== Professional life ==
He was known to be a brilliant strategist who did not condone violence and even made sure that no bloodshed took place during his reign. His charm, convincing ability and tactical skill saw him rise through the ranks and he became the Don of Bangalore between 1988 and 1990. He was a visionary who saw great potential in the city and wanted to establish himself as a businessman and saw his life as only a means to that end. Though most of his activities, his inner circle and intentions were shrouded in secrecy, he is alleged to have created a nascent network stretching from Sri Lanka to the Middle East and Russia etc.

His expenditure was said to be close to ₹1 crore a month and revenue generation capacity of ₹3 crore per month in 1989.

During his last days he was said to be making inroads into the field of real estate and made large-scale investments in land around Bangalore city. Muttappa Rai planned well and killed Oil Kumar. He died on 20 November 1990.
