= 1st Rank Raju (2015 film) =

- Directed by: Naresh Kumar HN
- Screenplay by: Naresh Kumar, Ashwin Kodange, Thrilok Reddy
- Story by: Naresh Kumar
- Produced by: Manjunath V.K.
- Starring: Gurunandan; Apoorva Gowda
- Cinematography: Praveen Shambulingam
- Edited by: Giri Mahesh(M.P.halli)
- Music by: Kiran Ravindranath
- Production company: Dolphin Entertainment
- Distributed by: Jayanna Films
- Release date: 27 November 2015
- Running time: 143 minutes
- Country: India
- Language: Kannada

1st Rank Raju is a 2015 Indian Kannada-language comedy drama film written and directed by Naresh Kumar HN in his debut, and produced by V. K. Manjunath. It features Gurunandan and Apoorva Gowda in the lead roles. The rest of the cast includes Tanishka Kapoor, Sadhu Kokila, Ananth Nag, Achyut Rao, Manadeep Rai, Giri Mahesh and Master Chinmai. The film's music director Kiran Ravindranath.The director remade the film in Telugu in 2019 with the same title. The film was declared a success at box-office.

== Synopsis ==
Film explores the importance of the academic qualification in life. The story line conveys the message to parents who consider only academic achievements results in successful life. It was the most talked movie in 2015, commercially too, the movie tasted tremendous success.

== Cast ==
- Gurunandan as Raju / Raj The Showman
- Apoorwa Gowda as Sanmitha
- Tanishka Kapoor as Mary
- Ananth Nag as Company MD Satyamurthy
- Achyuth Kumar as Raju's Dad
- Sadhu Kokila as Shani Kappor (S.K. Shani)
- Sudha Belawadi as Raju's Mom
- Jai Jagadish as School Principal
- Mandeep Rai as Principal of college
- Giri Mahesh as Gudli Hero
- Master Chinmayi as First Rank Raju (young)
- Nagaraja Murthy as Karnataka Education Minister
- Amith as Friend
- Ashwin Kodange as Manager

== Soundtrack ==
The music of the film was composed by Kiran Ravindranath.

No.	Title	Lyrics	Singer(s)	Length
1.	"Raju Raju"	Yogaraj Bhat	Tippu
2.	"Shuru Shuru"	Hrudaya Shiva	Shreya Ghoshal
3.	"Shake Your Body"	Hrudaya Shiva	Varun, Rocky
4.	"Baccha Iddang Idde"	Hrudaya Shiva	Vijay Prakash
5.	"Raju Raju Junior bit"	Ashwin Kodange	Varun
6.	"Shuru Shuru pathos"	Ashwin Kodange	Kiran Ravindranath
7.	"Yaare Nee Yaare Hudugi"	Hrudaya Shiva	Karthik, Rumana
8.	"Ekangi Naanu Ekangi"	Jayanth Kaikini	Sonu Nigam
9.	"Baccha Iddang Idde bit"	Hrudaya Shiva	Vijay Prakash

== Reception ==
A critic from The Times of India wrote that "Director Naresh Kumar has come up with an entertaining film, where the message isn't forced. The casting is quite accurate. Gurunandan as Raju excels. The music, cinematography, editing and re-recording too are commendable. Watch this film for its entertainment quotient and good performances".
