= Kalgejje =

- Directed by: A. Bangaru
- Written by: A. Bangaru
- Produced by: M. Nagabhushan
- Starring: Vishwas; Anant Nag; Roopika
- Cinematography: Veenus Murthy
- Edited by: Basavaraj Urs
- Music by: Gandharva
- Production company: Bright Entertainments
- Release date: 4 February 2011
- Country: India
- Language: Kannada

Kalgejje is a 2011 Indian Kannada-language musical romance film starring newcomers Vishwas and Roopika alongside Anant Nag. The film has been directed and written by A Bangaru and produced by debutant Nagabhushan under his home banner. Gandharva has composed the music.

== Plot ==
The film is about romance and has music as its primary element.

== Cast ==
- Vishwas as Gowri Shankar
- Anant Nag
- Roopika as Aarti
- Rangayana Raghu
- Sumithra
- Pavitra Lokesh
- T. S. Nagabharana .... Guest Appearance
- V. Manohar .... Guest Appearance
- S. Mahendar ..... Guest Appearance

== Soundtrack ==
Song	Singer	Lyrics
"Panchamaveda"	Rajesh Krishnan, Anuradha Bhat	A. Bangaru
"Swathimale Hage"	Vijay Prakash, Anuradha Bhat	Gandharva
"Kandu Kandu"	Chethan Sosca	A. Bangaru
"Yeko Hrudaya"	K. S. Chithra	Gandharva
"Malegalada Munjaneya"	S. P. Balasubrahmanyam	Gandharva
"Badukinali Bayaside"	Vijay Prakash	A. Bangaru
"Kalgejjeya Danige"	Hemanth Kumar	Gandharva

== Reception ==
=== Critical response ===
Shruti Indira Laskhminarayana of Rediff.com scored the film at 1.5 out of 5 stars and says "Kalgejje comes with a message for both parents and children. It, on one hand shows how wrong it is to impose one's career plans on their children, and on the other hand, shows how children should resist from disregarding parents. It also highlights the struggles of youth aiming to make it big in films. If the story was told in a different way, it would have come as a breath of fresh air". B S Srivani from Deccan Herald wrote "Instead, this patchwork quilt offers only visual treat, but no real comfort. Roopika is turning into a reliable performer while Vishwas would do well to acquire some seriousness in his outlook. Rangayana Raghu treads the thin line between ludicrity and credibility. Comedy turns into a farce. The sounds of this anklet do not resonate".

== Awards ==
Karnataka State Film Awards 2010-11

- Best Lyricist – A. Bangaru
- Best Sound Recording – Palani D Senapathi
