= K. M. Chaitanya =

Indian film director

- Occupations: Film and Theatre Director
- Known for: Aa Dinagalu (2007)

K. M. Chaitanya (Kannada: ಚೈತನ್ಯ) is a film director, documentary maker and theater person who works in Kannada cinema. He is known for directing Aa Dinagalu (2007).

== Career ==
Chaitanya studied Journalism at Christ College.

=== Films ===
He has worked as Associate director to Girish Karnad for the National award winning film "Kanooru Heggadithi". His first feature film Aa Dinagalu in Kannada, won several awards including the Filmfare Awards South for Best Director and Best Feature Film in 2007. Chaitanya also won awards for Best Debutant Director by the South Indian Cinematographers' Association, Chennai Film Fans Association and Raghavendra Chitravani Award. Aa Dinagalu was listed by The Week among the top 10 Indian films of 2007. He directed "Suryakaanti", a feature film in Kannada language, in 2010.

=== Documentaries ===
Chaitanya has also directed several documentaries. He was the director for the series "Back To the Floor" that was telecast on BBC World Service television. He also directed documentaries as part of the BBC series Business Bizarre. He also directed a Kannada documentary titled "Nadedu Banda Daari" on the life and work of his mentor Girish Karnad commissioned by Sahitya Akademi. He has written and directed a documentary for The Ministry of Culture, Government of India on Yakshagana. He has directed a documentary series "Business Bizarre" (2003) for the BBC World – on unique business opportunities in India. He has directed "Cancer Stories" (2002 – 2003) – a documentary on Cancer for patients in the UK. He has directed a documentary on "Traditional Narratives in Speech Training" for the National School of Drama, New Delhi

=== Television ===
Chaitanya has also produced and directed serials for television. These include Kichchu in ETV Kannada which brought about issues of rural woman and their turbulent lives. The serial had National award winning actor Umashree in the lead role. He has also produced "Mugilu" (Clouds) and written and produced the historical series "Ondaanondu Kaaladalli" for ETV, Kannada.

Chaitanya has directed a mini series for television based on "Kusumabaale" – the award winning novel by dalit activist and Padmashree award winning writer Devanur Mahadeva. He then adapted yet another novel into a tele series. It was based on "Om Namo" written by renowned Kannada writer Shantinath Desai. Both the mini series were produced by Girish Karnad.

He is presently producing a television series called Aakrutii – for Udaya TV, Kannada. The series is a paranormal and horror based storyline presently under production. He has produced, written and directed "Preethi Endarenu", a television series in Kannada for Suvarna Channel in Karnataka. Starring film actors JahnaviKamat and Shrunga, the serial is a romantic comedy that was telecast every Monday to Saturday at 6.30pm on Suvarna channel.

He has produced and written the story & screenplay for a TV series titled Mookambika. It is a fantasy set in a fictional land in history. The series was directed by veteran director Rajender Singh. It was telecast on ETV, Kannada from October, 2011.

He has produced and directed Mugilu (2007) a popular daily television series on ETV Kannada.

He has directed Kichchu (2006) a daily television series for ETV Kannada. An adaptation from three plays by Spanish playwright Garcia Lorca, Kichchu was a popular series set in medieval India. It concerns the story of four unmarried girls and their widowed mother, dealing with life in a feudal setup.

He has directed "Nigudha" – in Kannada with a duration of 90 mins for DD9, the satellite television channel for Kannada. The film was based on a real-life psychological case study of Manic-depressive Psychosis and was produced by T.N. Seetharam.

He has co- directed with Girish Karnad for "KanoorkiThakurani" a Hindi serial based on a Kannada novel by Kuvempu. The serial was simultaneously produced along with a Kannada feature film on the same novel.

He has been an Associate Director to Girish Karnad in the television series – "Antaraal". The series dealt with case studies in Psychology compiled by renowned psychologist Dr Ashok Pai. Also scripted a few episodes of the series.

=== Theatre ===
Chaitanya has directed several dramas for the stage. Prominent among them are Mahesh Elkunchwar's play Vasamshi Jeernani produced by Drishti theatre group, translated by Girish Karnad. He has also directed Jnanpith award winning writer Chandrashekar Kambar's play "Sambashiva Prahasana", P. Lankesh's "Sankranthi", Prasanna's "Dangeya Munchina Dinagalu" and Edward Albee's "Zoo Story". Dangeya Munchina Dinagalu was his directorial debut during his tenure as a student at Christ College in 1991. The cast consisted of 57 students and the show won laurels at the Inter-collegiate Ullal Shield theatre competitions of Karnataka. He has Directed Girish Karnad's Kannada play Odakalu bimba along with the playwright. Featuring Padmadshri and National award winning actress, Arundati Nag, the play was also staged in Hindi by Girish Karnad and Chaitanya as "Bikhare Bimb" and in English as "A heap of broken images" (Featuring Arundathi Raja). Bikhare Bimb won the Mahindra Excellence in Theater Award (National Award) for the year 2008.

=== Awards and honours ===
- Winner of the Filmfare award for Best Director for the year 2007 for the film 'AaDinagalu'.
- Winner of the award for Best Debutant Director given by SICA (South Indian Cinematographer’s Association).
- Winner of the award for Best Debutant Directo given by Chitravani, a popular film magazine in the Kannada language.
- Won the Mahindra Excellence in Theatre Award (META) for BEST DIRECTOR for the theatre production "BikhareBimb" (Hindi) along with Girish Karnad.
- Won the Times KAFTA award -2017, for "Best Adapted Screenplay" for the movie Aake.
- Awarded as 'Distinguished Alumni' by Christ University, Bangalore in 2015.
- Awarded 'Distinguished Alumni' by University of Hyderabad 2019.
- Served as Member, Karnataka Chalanachitra Academy for the duration 2012 –14.

=== Other works ===
He has worked as Bangalore Correspondent for CNN indiadotcom – a weekly series on the Information Technology Sector on CNN between 2000 – 2002. Directed corporate films and advertisements for several companies including Madhura Garments, Grasim, Confederation of Indian Industries, Edusports, Karnataka Silk Industries Corporation (KSIC), JNPT, Southern Batteries, Vetcare, Mysore paints, Madhu automobiles, Neeladri amusement park, Raichur Thermal Electrical Plant, HUDCO and many others.

== Filmography ==
Key
†	Denotes films that have not yet been released

Year	Film	Notes	Ref.
2007	Aa Dinagalu	Filmfare Award for Best Director	
2009	Suryakaanti		
2013	Parari		
2014	Aatagara		
2017	Aake		
2018	Amma I Love You		
2020	Aadyaa		
2024	Abbabba		
2026	Balaramana Dinagalu		
