= Edegarike =

- Film poster
- Directed by: D. Sumana Kittur
- Written by: Agni Shridhar
- Screenplay by: Agni Shridhar; D. Sumana Kittur
- Based on: Edegarike by Agni Shridhar
- Produced by: Syed Aman Bachchan; M. S. Ravindra
- Starring: Aditya; Atul Kulkarni; Aakanksha Mansukhani
- Cinematography: B. Rakesh
- Edited by: Ruben
- Music by: Sadhu Kokila
- Production company: Megha Movies
- Release date: 23 November 2012
- Running time: 105 minutes
- Country: India
- Language: Kannada

Edegarike (transl. Guts) is a 2012 Indian Kannada crime drama film directed by Sumana Kittur. It is based on the novel of the same name written by Agni Shridhar and stars Aditya in the lead role, while Atul Kulkarni, Achyuth Kumar, Srujan Lokesh, Dharma and Aakanksha Mansukhani play supporting roles.

The film is based on the real-life incidents that occurred in the 1990s and is about cult figures in the Karnataka underworld such as Sridhar, Muthappa Rai and Bachchan. The film opened to widespread critical acclaim upon theatrical release. It won the Special Jury Award at the 6th Bangalore International Film Festival. It was screened at the Indo-French International Film Festival in Bengaluru in 2023.

== Plot ==
Sona is a hitman, who works under Bhai in Mumbai. One day, Sona meets a social worker and the two fall for each other after many meetings. Through Bhai's advisor Tukaram Shetty, Sona completes various assignments for Bhai, including killing his mentor Dholakia, after which he hides himself in Bangalore. However, Rashmi gets captured by Crime Branch Inspector J. Nayak where she learns about Sona's true profession.

Rashmi calls Sona and tells him to surrender to the police. Sona relucantly agrees and decides to retire from the crime syndicate by surrendering to the police and lead a peaceful life with Rashmi. Bhai learns about this and hires Muthappanna to eliminate Sona. Muthappanna hires Sridhar Murthy and Bachchan for the job. They arrive in Bangalore and meet Sona. However, Sridhar learns that the cops are hunting for Sona and police protection has been increased by the city's newly appointed police commissioner, so the duo, along with Sona escape to a dense forest.

After learning about Sona's past, Sridhar feels guilty and decides to help Sona escape from Bhai's wrath, but is opposed by Bachchan. During a chat in the afternoon, Sona reveals that he already knew that Sridhar and Bachchan were hired by Bhai to kill him and is ready to die. Learning that Sridhar is hesitant to kill Sona due to their friendship, Bachchan kills Sona while Sridhar walks away. He receives a call from Rashmi on Sona's phone, where Sridhar lies about Sona getting killed in an accident (Sona gave his phone and told Sridhar to lie about his death to Rashmi as his last wish). After this, Sridhar writes a book about Sona titled Edegarike.

== Cast ==
- Aditya as Sona
- Atul Kulkarni as Sridhar Murthy
- Aakanksha Mansukhani as Rashmi
- Achyuth Kumar as Tukaram Shetty
- Sharath Lohitashwa as Anthony "Kalia"
- Dharma as Muthappanna
- Srujan Lokesh as Bachchan
- Chi. Guru Dutt as Dholakia
- Ramakrishna as Rashmi's father
- P. Ravi Shankar as Crime Branch Police Inspector J. Nayak

== Production ==
=== Development ===
Edegarike was a crime novel written by journalist Agni Shridhar in the early 2000s about the India Mafia circling around Mumbai and Bangalore headed a mafia leader from Dubai. The novel had been a chart topper for several weeks and proved a hit among readers. Since then, around 15 attempts were made to adapt it into a film. Following this, Sumana Kittur who had earlier directed Slum Bala and Kallara Santhe took up the project.

=== Casting and filming ===
Following the announcement of the film in October 2010, reports said Kishore would be playing one of the three lead roles of mafia dons in the film. Bhavana had been signed in to play the female lead in the film. However, she had to back out due to health grounds, a role that eventually went to Aakanksha Mansukhani, who had earlier appeared and won praise for her performance in the 2011 Kannada film Olave Mandhara. Aditya was then signed in to play the lead role in the film, with Srujan Lokesh to play a supporting character. Filming that began in late-2011 continued for a period of 35 days in places such as Bangalore, Sakleshpur, Mangalore. It completed in June 2012.

== Soundtrack ==
Edegarike

Soundtrack album by Sadhu Kokila
- Released: November 2012
- Genre: Feature film soundtrack
- Length: 3:48
- Label: Anand Audio

Sadhu Kokila chronology
Sanju Weds Geetha (2011)	Edegarike (2012)	Myna (2013)

Sadhu Kokila composed music for the film's soundtrack, and the lyrics were written by Sumana Kittur. The album consists of one soundtrack. Kokila also sung the track.

Track listing
No.	Title	Lyrics	Singer(s)	Length
1.	"Neenondu Mugiyada Mouna"	Sumana Kittur	Sadhu Kokila	3:48
Total length:				3:48

== Release and reception ==
=== Screenings ===
As a part of screening marking 100 years of Indian cinema, Edegarike was screened at the Puerto Rico Film Institute in 2013. It was then screened at the first edition of the Mumbai Women's International Film Festival in October 2013, as the only Indian film. Following this the film was screened at the 6th edition of the Bangalore International Film Festival in January 2014, where it was awarded the Special Jury Award.

=== Critical reception ===
Upon release, Edegarike opened to positive reviews from critics and audience with praise towards the film's direction, writing, cast performances and technical aspects.

G. S. Kumar of The Times of India reviewed the film giving it a rating of four out of five and wrote, "Gripping narration and excellent screenplay with a touch of romance make the story quite interesting." He concluding writing praises of the performances of actors playing pivotal roles in the film". Shruti I. L. From DNA wrote, "The film remains loyal to the book and comes only with a few changes that are needed to cater to cinematic sensibilities. The script and screenplay is aptly supported by hard hitting and thought provoking dialogues" and added, "Director Suman Kittur has managed to extract stellar performances from each of her actors. Lead actors Adithya and Atul Kulkarni steal the show with their understated acts." B S Srivani from Deccan Herald wrote "The dialogues emphasise this tension very well. Rakesh’s camerawork is excellent. Sadhu Kokila single-handedly lends that much-needed balance to a taut drama with a soulful rendition of Kittur’s lyrics. A clean effort. Reserved for a leisurely watch when pondering over life’s mechanics".

== Awards ==
Award / Film Festival	Category	Recipient	Result	Reference
Bangalore International Film Festival	Special Jury Award	Sumana Kittur	Won	
Karnataka State Film Awards	Third Best Film	Syed Aman Bachchan, M. S. Ravindra	Won	
Karnataka State Film Awards	Best Cinematographer	B. Rakesh	Won	
Filmfare Awards South	Best Film – Kannada	Syed Aman Bachchan, M. S. Ravindra	Nominated	
Filmfare Awards South	Best Director – Kannada	Sumana Kittur	Nominated	
Filmfare Awards South	Best Actor – Kannada	Aditya	Nominated	
Filmfare Awards South	Best Supporting Actor – Kannada	Atul Kulkarni	Won	
Udaya Film Awards	Best Supporting Actor	Dharma	Won	
Udaya Film Awards	Best Male Playback Singer	Sadhu Kokila	Won	
Bangalore Times Film Awards	Best Film	Syed Aman Bachchan, M. S. Ravindra	Nominated	
Bangalore Times Film Awards	Best Director	Sumana Kittur	Nominated	
Bangalore Times Film Awards	Best Actor – Male	Aditya	Nominated	

== See also ==
- List of crime films
- India Mafia
