= Sumana Kittur =

Indian journalist

- Born: Kittur, Mysore, Karnataka, India
- Other name: Suman Kittur
- Occupations: Film director; lyricist; screenwriter; journalist
- Years active: 2007–present
- Spouse: Sreenivas (m. 2020)

D. Suman Kittur is an Indian journalist, film director and lyricist working in Kannada cinema. She began as an independent director with Slum Bala (2008), before working on films such as Kallara Santhe (2009), Edegarike (2012) and Kiragoorina Gayyaligalu (2016). Most of her films deal with anti-social elements. She is one of the few women directors to win a state award.

== Biography ==
Suman was born in Kittur, a village near Periyapatna in Mysore district of Karnataka. Her father owned a small theatre in the same village. With the love and passion for cinemas, he ran the theatre, though it faced huge losses. His vision to bring entertainment even to small towns was the reason she took movies. Her Inspiration came from her father initially. After her graduation, she moved to Bangalore, when the villagers forced her to marry. Seeing the talent she possessed, her father took him to journalist turned film director Agni Shridhar. Later his father died and She began her film career assisting him. She began her life as a writer for Agni Journals. With her writing skills she later began writing songs and scripts for movies. Foreseeing her talent, his guru gave the first opportunity to work in films. She began with film Aa Dinagalu. Though she took the entire work of the film, she gave credits to the director and later realising her talent she was given the huge responsibility of become a debut director.

== Filmography ==
Year	Title	Role	Notes	Ref.
2007	Aa Dinagalu	Associate director and lyricist		
2008	Slum Bala	Director, lyricist		
2009	Kallara Santhe	Director, lyricist	Karnataka State Film Award (Special Jury Award)	
2012	Edegarike	Director, screenwriter, lyricist	Karnataka State Film Award for Third Best Film; Bangalore International Film Festival Special Jury Award; Nominated, Filmfare Award for Best Director; Nominated, Bangalore Times Film Award for Best Director	
2016	Kiragoorina Gayyaligalu	Director		

== Personal life ==
Sumana Kittur was married on 17 April 2020.
