= Syed Aman Bachchan =

Indian film producer

- Born: Syed Amanullah; Karnataka, India
- Other names: Bachchan
- Citizenship: Indian
- Occupation: Film producer

Syed Aman Bachchan is an Indian film producer in the Kannada film industry. Edegarike, a film produced by him and directed by Sumana Kittur, was the only Indian film selected for screening in Mumbai Women's International Film Festival, 2013.

== Selected filmography ==
1. Kiragoorina Gayyaligalu (2016)
2. Edegarike (2012)
3. Thamassu (2010)
4. Kallara Santhe (2009)
5. Aa Dinagalu (2007)

== See also ==
- List of people from Karnataka
- Cinema of Karnataka
- List of film producers
- Cinema of India
