= Agni Sreedhar =

Former gangster, writer, film director

Agni Shridhar is a Kannada former gangster, writer, critic and artist. He founded Karunada Sene. Later he founded the weekly Kannada newspaper Agni, and turned a professional writer. He has written a book called Daadagiriya Dinagalu, meaning the days of Goondaism.

He hails from Channapattana and studied in Bengaluru.

== Literary works ==
- He has scripted a play called Edegarike.
- He has scripted a film with Girish Karnad called Aa Dinagalu which is derived from his Daadagiriya Dinagalu written on Bengaluru crime of 1986.
- His directorial debut movie Thamassu (2010)
- He scripted a film in 2022 called Head Bush. Which is directed by Shoonya.

== Filmography ==
Year	Film	Director	Writer	Notes
2007	Aa Dinagalu	No	Yes	
2009	Kallara Santhe	No	Yes	
2010	Thamassu	Yes	Yes	Drectorial debut
2012	Edegarike	No	Yes	
2016	Kiragoorina Gayyaligalu	No	Screenplay	
2021	Head Bush	No	Story	
TBA	Silent Sunila	No	Yes	

== Awards ==
Thamassu directed by Agni Shridhar was adjudged as the second best film in the Karnataka State Film Awards for the year 2010–11. He also won the Best Screen Play writer award for the same movie.
