= Manthana =

2007 Indian Kannada soap opera

Manthana (Kannada: ಮಂಥನ) is a 2007 Indian Kannada soap opera, which aired on ETV Kannada. The serial portrayed the challenges faced by individuals and social classes when they try being thoughtful in their actions ( Manthana literally transliterates as Churning). The show started in 2007. The director is S. N. Sethuram who has acted in T. N. Seetharam's series of Maya Mruga, Manvanthara and Muktha (TV series). He is also a retired Commerce Officer.

There are three prime strong characters that of a Mother and her two daughters (one being her own and other step but groomed without any distinction) who are shown in different sets of society and the way they face challenges. The Mother is self-respecting, tough character who takes responsibility being a second wife, now a widow but still a very practicing fundamentally religious woman (void of superstitions). The elder daughter is a gold medalist in her degree academics but is deeply rooted with the family values and displays typical housemaker character having husband, son and a daughter. The younger daughter is an Indian Revenue Services officer who runs away from family and marries her love. The ideological clashes of these central characters and the related ones to them are the mainstay of the show.

== About the series ==
The series which started to be aired from 4 March 2007 in ETV Kannada at 10 P.M. became very popular due to which the timings have changed to prime time at 8:30 P.M from 26 November 2007. The series ended on 4 April 2008. The show grows from individual thoughts and how it clashes and unites to form a larger stage of government, culture and country. The fundamentals, failures and the practice of institutions from an individual to a family to a country are repeatedly questioned and answered too with a wonderful blend of matriarch and patriarchal systems rivaling each other.

S. N. Sethuram has used the power of language as its effect can be seen in every dialogue. He presents the series with a starting quote of Arpane ella thaayandarige - presenting to all mothers. It is well known for the type of dialogue delivery which is first of its kind in television history. Not many series would have such lengthy dialogues and the way they convey any situation. Absolute mastery of the language may at times be seen overwhelming but hasn't come in the way of popularity. On the contrary it is well received for usage of authentic Kannada in a powerfully versatile manner. The series can also be viewed as celebration of Kannada.

== Other characters ==
Apart from the family related and the prime ones, other characters are the Indian government officers and those which revolve around the vested interests of Shivashankar Reddy - a fundamental capitalist.

== Casting crew ==
- Yashodamma - Lakshmi Chandrashekar
- Sumathi - Sudha Belawadi
- Krishna Kumar - Chandrahasa ullal
- Shruthi - Chitrashri
- Suresha - Narahari
- Swathi - Nandini Patavardhan
- Nandini Jadhav - Nandini Gowda
- Jadhav - Mandya Ramesh
- Sadananda - Achyuth Kumar
- Veena (Sadananda's wife) - Veena Sundar
- Sumeru - Sumeru Raut (Sadananda's son)
- Shivashankara Reddy - Shivaji Rao Jadhav
- Appajappa - Reddy's personnel
- Sreenivasaiah - Harikrishna
- Sreenivasaiah's wife - Sundarashri
- Pushpa - Sreenivasaiah's daughter - Pushpa Belavadi
- Rajaram - Aravind Kaushik
- Ramachandra Raaya - TN Srinivasa Murthy
- Ramachandra Raaya's wife - Padma Kumta
- Yogeesha - Ramesh Indira
- Srinath - Srinath Vasishta
- Meera -
- Shivaram (Srinatha's father) -
- Padma - Jayashree
- Ullas - Mahesh Rao
- Mangala -
- Mangala husband (Lawyer) -
- Swamiji -
- Prof. Prahlada Rao -Sudheendra Sharma
- Prof Prahlada Rao's wife - Usha Bhandari
- Praveena - Raghu Samartha
- Padmanabhaiah -
- Minister - Bhargavi Narayan
- Mestru- Sethuram
- Kshama -
- Chandrakanth -
- Nirupa - Harish Raj
- Kapinipathi -
- Rajesh -
- Ranganatha Swamy -
- Bank Manager - B. V. Rajaram
- Rekha - Shruti Naidu
