= Lakshmi Chandrashekar =

Indian actress

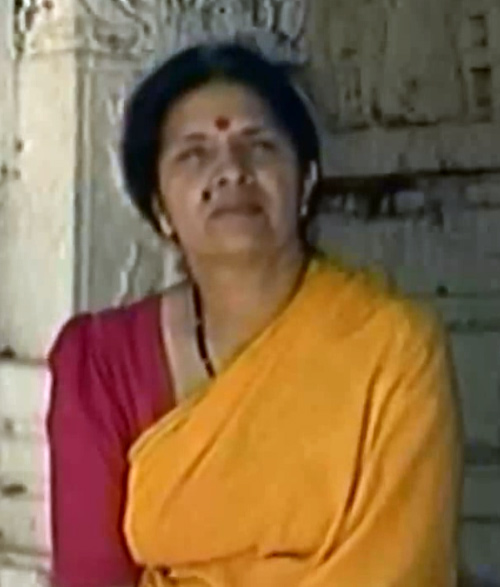
- Born: Lakshmi; 1950 or 1951 (age 75–76); Hassan, Mysore State, India
- Other name: Laxmi Chandrashekar
- Education: University of Mysore; University of Leeds
- Occupations: Actress; writer; professor; translator
- Years active: 1967–present
- Spouse: B. K. Chandrashekar
- Children: 2
- Relatives: H. K. Narasimha Murthy (brother)

Lakshmi Chandrashekar is an Indian theatre personality, actress and former professor, known for her work in Kannada theatre, film and television. She is also a prominent translator of Kannada literature and drama critic. Acting in plays staged in both Kannada and English, she is noted for her solo performances in Eddelu, Medea, Kittalemane Kaveri, Lady Minus Macbeth and Shakespearana Srimathi. As a theatre personality, Lakshmi's plays have often explored themes of feminism.

Some of Lakshmi's notable screen performances came in films such as Avasthe (1987), S. P. Sangliyana Part 2 (1990) and Atithi (2002), and television soaps such as Mayamruga and Grihabhanga. In addition to acting, she founded Kriyative Theatre in 2005 as a platform for her independent productions and solo performances. She is a recipient of the Karnataka Nataka Academy Award.

== Career ==
=== Theatre ===
During her first year in college in 1967, Lakshmi joined Samathentho (Saraswatipurada Madhyada Thengina Thotada kalavidaru), a Mysore-based amateur theatre troupe. After her marriage to B. K. Chandrashekar, she moved to Bangalore, where she joined Prasanna's troupe Samudaya.

Upon returning to Bangalore from the UK, while teaching English literature at the NMRKV College for Women, Lakshmi also appeared in plays with Samudaya for the next 20 years. She recalled that in the 1980s and 1990s, the troupe, with the support of playwright Prasanna, professor Narendar Pani and others, "we did a number of thought-provoking plays," including translated works from the West. Te troupe also performed to scripts based on real incidents with societal themes. Lakshmi played Virginia and later Sarati in the Kannada version of Life of Galileo. In Dangeya Munchina Dinagalu (Days before the Mutiny), she played a courtier, and mother earth in Madari Madaiah. The latter popularised stylised form of acting in a folk-based song and dance sequence-based play. Other popular plays she acted in include Meet Mr Satyaji made by T. N. Narasimhan, Mahachaitra and N. A. Suri's Ee Kelaginavaru, based on Maxim Gorky's play The Lower Depths. She also played a role in Peter Coe's play, Snake Pit, based on the life of activist Snehalata Reddy. Recalling this in an interview with The Hindu in 2018, Lakshmi stated: "Though by then I was clear that I wanted to involve in social activities and was aware that theatre was my strength, it was only after witnessing the response from the audience after this play Snake Pit, did I realise that I should be taking up theatre as the medium for my creative expression."

Starting 1999, Lakshmi began performing solo. Forher initial monologues, she took women characters from different plays such as Lady Macbeth from William Shakespeare's Macbeth, Sakavva from Devanur Mahadeva's Odalaala and Grusha Vashnadze from Bertolt Brecht's The Caucasian Chalk Circle. She frequently toured within India and abroad, and delivered performances of Just A Woman (in English) and Hennallave (in Kannada), she which conceptualised and scripted. On what the play conveys to the society, she stated: "It's a kind of monologue, though not entirely. I play eight different characters in the one-hour play. Essentially, it traces the path of Savitri, a middle-class woman – wife and a mother with her role and her role in society. The play goes on say that the woman continues to play the same role as for ages with no change of any kind. It is all about oppression and liberation." The characters were taken from mythology, folklore and present-day. She also presented Medea, a Greek mythological story by Euripides, from the perspective of its protagonist Medea. In Eddelu, she played the modern-day woman and the intense pressures she is put through.

Subsequently, apart from acting, Lakshmi took to running theatre and helping stage plays. In 2005, she started Kriyative Theatre, intended as a platform for her solo performances. She stated: "As I started doing more performances, I needed an organisation that was under my control. Solo plays are tricky, some work and some do not; I did not want another troupe to spending its money on my productions. I wanted to fund my own plays." Her popular performances included Singarevva Mattu Aramane, Shakespeare's Wife and Kittalemane Kaveri. She performed the former in national and international drama festivals and in universities and conferences on women's issues. On Shakespearana Srimathi (Shakespeare's Wife in English), she opined that William Shakespeare's wife Anne Hathaway was maligned by most scholars, and that her play Shakespeare's Wife was written taking Germaine Greer's research on Hathaway into account. In Kittalemane Kaveri, a modern-day adaptation of Stella Kon's Emily of Emerald Hill, she plays a Kodava matriarch. The Kriyative Theatre later explored other themes such as comedy and enivornmentalism in their plays.

=== Film and television ===
Lakshmi made her film debut with Avasthe (1987), a political drama based on U. R. Ananthamurthy's novel. Her portrayal of the wife of Anant Nag's character was considered "unfair". Starting 1990s, Lakshmi appeared in television soaps such as Mayamruga. Around this time, she also appeared in television soaps such as Gorur Kathaloka, Sankalana, Namma Nammali and T. N. Seetharam's Kathegara. She also acted in Shankar Nag's television series Malgudi Days and play Nagamandala. In Girish Kasaravalli's serial Grihabhanga, based on S. L. Bhyrappa's novel, she played a widow.

== Personal life ==
Lakshmi was born in Hassan, in the erstwhile Mysore State (today Karnataka). Her father Krishna Murthy was a hotelier and an avid lover of music. Her brother is violinist H. K. Narasimha Murthy. Lakshmi completed her schooling in Channarayapatna, pursued graduation at NMRKV College for Women, where should also go on to teach for a few years. She pursued her postgraduate degree in English literature from the University of Mysore.

After her marriage to B. K. Chandrashekar, Lakshmi pursued another postgraduate degree in English literature from the University of Leeds. She has two children with him, son Manas and daughter Sarayu.

== Drama works ==
"In place of oil, she uses honey and applies it to the baby and in place of honey, she uses oil and mixes it with tea"

— Lakshmi Chandrashekar, on the tragiccomedy drama Eddelu, speaking with Bangalore Mirror,

Drama play	Role	Ref
Singarevva mattu Aramane (Meaning: Singarevva and the palace; Based on Chandrashekhara Kambara's novel)	Singarevva	
Kittalemane Kaveri (Meaning: Orange Villa's Kaveri; A monodrama, of the adaptation of novel Emily of Emerald Hill by Stella Kon	Kaveri	
Gundaayana (Meaning: Gunda's story; A monologue comedy, based on Na Kasthuri's "Chakradrushti" meaning 360° vision)	Multirole	
Eddelu and Medea (Two short plays based on monologues of Dario Fo and Franca Rame)	Medea	
Heegadre Hege? (Meaning: What if it happens like this?; A comedy, based on articles of T. Sunandamma)	Sarasamma	
Aadaddella Olithe...? (Meaning: Whatever happened is for good?; A comedy, based on articles of T. Sunandamma)	Bhageerathi	
Ratnan Parpancha (Meaning: Ratna's world; Based on collective work of Rajarathnam)	Multirole	
Hennallave! (Meaning: Reason 'cause she's a woman)	Multirole	
Dustin Bayi Based on a short story by Gopalakrishna Aithal	Dustinbai	
Sahebara Sarkeetu (Meaning: Officer's circuit; Based on M.R.Srinivasa Murthy's novel Rangannana Kanasina Dinagalu)	Multirole	
The Lady minus Macbeth Based on Shakespeare's Lady Macbeth	Macbeth	

== Filmography ==
- Avasthe (1987)
- S. P. Sangliyana Part 2 (1990)
- Mathadana (2001)
- Atithi (2002)
- Mouni (2003)
- Beru (2005)
- Tananam Tananam (2006)
- Dadagiri (2007)
- Savaari 2 (2014)
- Jothi Alias Kothiraj (2014)
- Vidaaya (2015)
- Preethiyinda (2015)
- Kiragoorina Gayyaligalu (2016)

=== Television ===
Year	Title	Role	Ref.
	Gorur Kathaloka		
1987	Malgudi Days		
	Sankalana		
	Namma Nammali		
	Kathegara		
1998	Mayamruga	Kamalamma	
	Kamanabillu		
2001	Grihabhanga		
2023	Matte Mayamruga		

== Bibliography ==
Translations (Kannada to English)

- Mahamayi by Chandrashekhara Kambara (2000)
- Singarevva and the Palace (2000)
- Mahachaitra: The Great Spring and other Plays by H. S. Shivaprakash (2002)
- The Sign: Vachanas of 12th Century with Introduction, Select Bibliography, and Glossary (2007)
- Shikharasoorya by Chandrashekhara Kambara (2017)

== Awards ==
Year	Award	Work	Credits	Category	Result	Ref
2014	Karnataka Nataka Academy Awards	Drama and theatre roles	Actress	Honorary	Won	
2002	Aryabhata Awards	Grihabhanga (Television series)	Actress	Best Actress	Won	

== See also ==
- Theatre of India
- List of people from Karnataka
