= Vidya Murthy =

Indian Kannada film and television actress

- Born: 18 July 1956 (age 68); Madikeri, Karnataka, India
- Occupations: Film actress; drama artist; television artist
- Spouse: Heragu Narasimha Murthy
- Children: 1

Vidya Murthy is an Indian Kannada film and television actress well known for her roles in television serials such as Mayamruga, Baduku, Muktha Muktha and Krishna Tulasi and recently has appeared in Papa Pandu and Magalu Janaki serials being aired on Colors Super Channel. She has over 35 serials and more than a dozen films to her credit. She is a talented artist from the T. N. Seetharam team.

== Career ==
Vidya Murthy started acting in plays in school and college. She was in the first batch of NMKRV College, selected by its principal, C. N. Mangala, because of her acting skills. Her family did not approve of her choice of career and nor did her parents-in-law after her marriage. She made her film debut in Urvashi, written by Gorur Ramaswamy Iyengar.

== Personal life ==
Murthy was born in the Hill Station town of Madikeri in Kodagu district as her father was working there. Her father's native place is Mavinakere in Hassan district. She is married to Heragu Narasimha Murthy and has a son. G. K. Jagdish, her brother, is her inspiration and was a renowned bharathanatyam dancer and actor. A Kannada literature, economics and psychology student, she was a part of a writers' group, and used to write poems and short stories.

== Television career ==
Year	Serial	Role	Channel
1998–2000	Shakthi		DD Chandana
1998–2000	Sanje Mallige		DD Chandana
1998–2000	Aasare		DD Chandana
1998–2000	Prathibimba		DD Chandana
1998–2000	Mayamruga		DD Chandana
2001–2003	Kathegara		DD Chandana
	Antharagange		
2001–2003	Manvantara		ETV Kannada
2003	Sthree	Kaveri	Star Suvarna
2003–2004	Dashavataara		ETV Kannada
2008–2010	Mukta		ETV Kannada
2018–2019	Paapa Pandu	Jayamma	Colors Super
2018–2020	Magalu Janaki	Devaki	Colors Super
2021–Present	Hitler Kalyana	Sarojini	Zee Kannada

== Filmography ==
1. Sparsha (2000)
2. Mathadana (2001)
3. Ninagagi (2002)
4. Chandu (2002)
5. Dumbee (2003)
6. Beru (2005)
7. Paramesha Panwala (2008)
8. Vamshi (2008)
9. Meravanige (2008)
10. Kicha Huccha (2010)
11. Mylari (2010)
12. Anna Bond (2012)
13. Toofan (2012)
14. Charminar (2013)
15. Ee Dil Helide Nee Bekantha (2014)
16. Chiravada Nenapu (2016)

== See also ==
- List of people from Karnataka
- Kannada cinema
- List of Indian film actresses
- Cinema of India
