= Snehalata Reddy =

Indian actress, producer and activist

Snehalatha Reddy
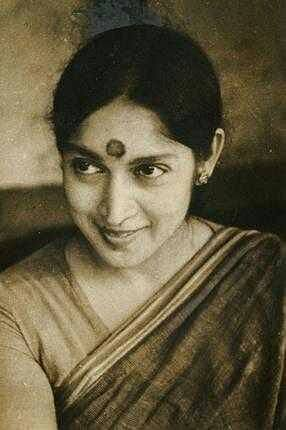
- Born: 1932; Andhra Pradesh, India
- Died: 20 January 1977 (aged 44–45)
- Occupations: Actress, Writer, Producer, Director, Social Activist
- Known for: Samskara, Imprisonment during Emergency
- Spouse: Pattabhirama Reddy Tikkavarapu
- Children: Nandana Reddy, Konarak Reddy
- Relatives: Ramana Reddy; T. Subbarami Reddy

Snehalatha Reddy (1932 – 20 January 1977) was an Indian actress, producer and social activist known for her works in Kannada cinema, Kannada theatre, Telugu cinema, and Telugu theatre. She was arrested over her involvement in the Baroda dynamite case and imprisoned for over 8 months during the Emergency in India. She was the co-founder of the Madras Players in the 1960s, the amateur group that staged memorable productions like Ibsen's Peer Gynt, directed by Douglas Alger, besides Twelfth Night and Tennessee William's Night of the Iguana, directed by Peter Coe. She also acted in, directed, or produced plays such as A View from the Bridge and The House of Bernarda Alba. In 2003, her husband Pattabhirama Reddy presented In the Hour of God, a play based on Sri Aurobindo's classic Savitri, inspired by the mythical woman who defied death for love, which he dedicated to Snehalata Reddy.

== Personal life ==
Snehalatha was born in 1932 to second generation Christian converts from the state of Andhra Pradesh. She strongly opposed the Colonial Rule and her initial years were immersed in the freedom struggle. She resented the British to such an extent that she reverted to her Indian name and wore only Indian clothes. Snehalatha was married to poet and film director Pattabhi Rama Reddy. The couple was devoted to the cause of renowned freedom fighter and activist Dr. Ram Manohar Lohia. Snehalata came under national spotlight for her role in the Kannada film Samskara, written by U. R. Ananthamurthy and directed by her husband. The film went on to win the National Award in 1970. Her last film Sone Kansari was released in 1977, after her death. Her daughter Nandana Reddy is a human rights, social and political activist. She is the founder and director of CWC (Concerned for Working Children), a Bangalore-based NGO that was nominated for 2012 Nobel Peace Prize. Nandana has written various memoirs of her mother's ordeals at imprisonment during the Emergency. Her son Konarak Reddy is a musical artist.

== Filmography ==
- Samskara (1970)
- Chanda Marutha (1977)
- Sone Kansari (1977)
