= Mathadana =

2001 film by T. N. Seetharam

- Film poster
- Directed by: T. N. Seetharam
- Written by: S. L. Bhyrappa
- Screenplay by: T. N. Seetharam
- Based on: Mathadana by S. L. Bhyrappa
- Produced by: H. G. Narayan; I. P. Malle Gowda
- Starring: Anant Nag; Devaraj; Tara; Hemanth Vasisht; Avinash
- Cinematography: Ashok Kashyap
- Edited by: Suresh Urs
- Music by: C. Aswath; V. Manohar
- Production company: Anikethana Chithra
- Release date: 12 January 2001
- Running time: 147 minutes
- Country: India
- Language: Kannada

Mathadana (transl. Voting) is a 2001 Indian Kannada-language political drama film directed by T. N. Seetharam, based on S. L. Bhyrappa's novel of the same name. It feaures an ensemble cast of Anant Nag, Devaraj, Tara, Hemanth Vasisht and Avinash. Set in the early 1970s, the film follows Dr. Shivappa (Vasisht), an idealistic rural doctor who becomes entangled in the corrupt world of electoral politics during a fiercely contested election in the erstwhile Mysore State. The film explores how political ambition and power struggles affect the lives of ordinary people around him, including an honest contractor (Nag) and his family.

The film was produced by under the banner Anikethana Chithra by H. G. Narayan and I. P. Malle Gowda. Music for the film was scored by C. Aswath and V. Manohar, while Ashok Kashyap served as cinematographer and Suresh Urs as editor. The film received critical praise upon theatrical release on 12 January 2001. At the 48th National Film Awards, the film won the National Film Award for Best Feature Film in Kannada. At the 2000–01 Karnataka State Film Awards, Avinash won the award for Best Supporting Actor. The film has often been rated as one of the best films in Kannada depicting state politics.

== Plot ==
In 1971 Mysore State, Putte Gowda, an honest Minister of Revenue, enjoys a strong reputation in Ramapura along with his loyal associate Ramalinge Gowda, a principled civil contractor. Ramalinge Gowda's younger daughter Lakshmi falls in love with Dr. Shivappa, a noble England-educated physician serving the poor. However, opposition politician Markandeya Gowda of the Samatha Party, who has lost election thrice to Putte Gowda, plans to strengthen his political prospects by marrying his son Prakash Kumar to Lakshmi, hoping to secure the support and influence of the popular Ramalinge Gowda while also projecting unity among members of the Vokkaliga community. Putte Gowda disapproves of this alliance and asks Ramalinge Gowda to get his daughter married to Shivappa instead. Ramalinge Gowda persuades Shivappa to return to England temporarily to earn a better income before marriage. Influenced by Markandeya Gowda, Shivappa ultimately withdraws from the marriage, unwilling to compromise his ideals of serving the poor after studying medicine on a government-sponsored scholarship.

At the same time, Ramalinge Gowda's elder daughter Sunanda dies during childbirth after her husband Puttathammayya insists on proceeding with a risky pregnancy in hopes of having a male heir. Puttathammayya later expresses his desire to marry Lakshmi, and despite Ramalinge Gowda's reluctance, Putte Gowda persuades him to consent. Ramalinge Gowda also provides financial assistance to Puttathammayya for the construction of a house in Bangalore. As local elections approach, Putte Gowda faces pressure from party leaders to finance campaign activities despite his clean political image. Reluctantly, he asks Ramalinge Gowda to raise money through unethical means in his civil contracts to support the party's electoral efforts.

During the 1972 Mysore State Assembly elections, former politician Sarvodaya Ramarao convinces Dr. Shivappa to contest independently from Ramapura, claiming the constituency needs an honest representative. Shivappa's growing popularity threatens both Putte Gowda and Markandeya Gowda. Unknown to Shivappa, Ramarao is secretly acting on behalf of Markandeya Gowda to divide Putte Gowda's vote share. On the eve of the election, Ramarao reveals the conspiracy to Shivappa. The plan succeeds, and Markandeya Gowda wins the election before joining the ruling establishment and securing a powerful ministerial position.

Following the defeat, Ramalinge Gowda struggles to repay a ₹10 lakh loan he had taken from moneylender Padmanabha Shetty by mortgaging his property to fund Putte Gowda's campaign on the Chief Minister Kantharaj's insistence. Putte Gowda distances himself from responsibility, claiming Ramalinge Gowda had already profited through government contracts. Puttathammayya too refuses to help despite owing money to Ramalinge Gowda. Simultaneously, government inspectors uncover financial irregularities in Ramalinge Gowda's hospital construction project, leaving him burdened with mounting debts and political pressure orchestrated by Markandeya Gowda. Unable to cope with the humiliation and financial ruin, Ramalinge Gowda dies by committing suicide. Lakshmi blames Puttathammayya for her father's death and leaves the marriage after settling her father's debts to Shetty by selling the family farmland. Rejecting the corrupt and opportunistic world around her, she visits Dr. Shivappa and expresses her wish to marry him. The film ends with the two leaving together on a boat.

== Cast ==
- Anant Nag as Ramalinge Gowda
- Devaraj as Sadaravalli Markandeya Gowda
- Tara as Lakshmi
- Hemanth Vasisht as Dr. Shivappa
- Avinash as Puttathammayya
- Sundar Raj as Bojanna, Markandeya Gowda's associate
- Mukhyamantri Chandru as Sarvodaya Ramarao
- S. N. Sethuram as Putte Gowda, Minister of Revenue
- Prakash Belawadi
- P. Sheshadri as Padmanabha Shetty
- Vanamala Vishwanath as Ramalinge Gowda's wife
- Hulivana Gangadharaiah as Quality Inspector
- Anantha Velu as Chief Minister Kantharaj
- Sridevi as Puttakka
- Sudha Belawadi as Sunanda
- Nalini Gowda
- Nagendra Shah
- C. Aswath
- Karibasavaiah as Balanna
- Girija Lokesh as Shivappa's mother
- Sihi Kahi Chandru as Srikanthe Gowda, Minister of Irrigation
- Lakshmi Chandrashekar
- Vidya Murthy as Putte Gowda's wife
- Vasudha Bharighat
- Baby Rajashree
- Baby Lahari
- Deepak Devarunda
- Bali Gowribidanur
- Rajesh Nataranga as Prakash Kumar (uncredited)
- Moogu Suresh as Putte Gowda's aide (uncredited)

== Production ==
=== Development ===
In the late 1990s, television director T. N. Seetharam had gained popularity through serials such as Mayamruga, Manvantara and Muktha. He was approached by H. G. Narayan of Anikethana Chithra, who, along with I. M. Vittal Murthy, then an IAS officer heading the Department of Kannada and Culture, had previously produced Kanooru Heggadithi (1999), an adaptation of Kuvempu's novel. Seetharam agreed to collaborate with the banner, and the team decided to adapt S. L. Bhyrappa's novel Matadana. Reflecting on the project, Seetharam stated that his own experience of contesting and losing the elections from Gauribidanur had influenced his understanding of politics and electoral dynamics.

Seetharam was drawn to the novel's depiction of the socio-political divisions between old and new Mysore, and its exploration of caste and electoral politics. Bhyrappa initially refused to grant the film rights, but later agreed following the persuasion of journalist Hamanayaka, who frequently wrote about Seetharam's Mayamruga. It was reported that Seetharam bought the rights for a fee between ₹1 lakh and ₹2 lakh. Although the novel was originally set in 1951, Seetharam shifted the setting to the 1970s, stating that he was more familiar with the political atmosphere and electoral dynamics of that period.

=== Casting ===
Seetharam stated that he was drawn to the novel because of its central character, a rural doctor known in his village for treating patients selflessly and without concern for money. He said that the story revolved around how the doctor is manipulated by politicians and how this affects his personal life. Anant Nag, Mukhyamantri Chandru, Sundar Raj, all of who had unsuccessfully contested elections in real life, like Seetharam, were cast to play prominent roles. Tara and Hemanth Vasisht were chosen to play the female lead and the male lead, the doctor, respectively.

=== Filming ===
The film was shot in Thirthahalli, which Seetharam chose because it was associated with Kuvempu and provided the backdrop he required for the story. A major fair sequence required a large crowd, but the production could not afford to hire thousands of junior artistes. Art director Shashidhar Adapa distributed pamphlets inviting local residents to watch the shooting and appear in the film, resulting in around 12,000 people arriving for the sequence.

== Soundtrack ==
Mathadana

Soundtrack album by C. Aswath and V. Manohar
- Released: January 2001
- Recorded: 2000
- Genre: Feature film soundtrack
- Length: 29:12
- Label: Tips Music

C. Ashwath and V. Manohar scored music for the film. Seetharam approached Ashwath after being impressed with his work on the television serial Mayamruga, and later suggested a collaboration with Manohar, which Ashwath agreed to. The track "Aluva Kadalolu Theli" was taken from a poem written by Gopalakrishna Adiga and "Naayi Thalimyalina" by H. S. Venkateshamurthy. The soundtrack album has seven tracks and was released in the form of audio cassettes in the second week of January 2001.

Track list
No.	Title	Lyrics	Singer(s)	Length
1.	"Idu Modalane Haadu"	V. Manohar	Rajesh Krishnan, Nanditha	5:04
2.	"Olavali Hadithe Hamsa"	V. Manohar	Rajesh Krishnan, Nanditha	2:59
3.	"Aidu Varshakomme"	Siddalingaiah	Rajesh Krishnan	3:51
4.	"Ranga Kunidu Rangu Eri"	Krishnamurthy Hanooru	Yuvaraj Janardhan, K. S. Surekha, M. D. Pallavi	4:25
5.	"Naayi Thalimyalina"	H. S. Venkateshamurthy	C. Aswath	5:09
6.	"Aluva Kadalolu Theli"	Gopalakrishna Adiga	Rajesh Krishnan, B. R. Chaya	4:28
7.	"Vrindavanadolu"	V. Manohar	Nanditha	3:16
Total length:				29:12

== See also ==
- Politics of Karnataka
- Caste politics
