= Pattabhi =

Pattabhi (Telugu: పట్టాభి) is an Indian name.

- Bhogaraju Pattabhi Sitaramayya, an Indian independence activist and political leader in the state of Andhra Pradesh
- K. Pattabhi Jois, an Indian yoga teacher
- Pattabhi Rama Reddy Tikkavarapu, an Indian writer, film producer and director
- Pattabhi Ram Kommareddy, Indian politician

Pattabhi (Telugu: పట్టాభి) is an Indian Hindu name.
