= Baa Nalle Madhuchandrake =

- Directed by: Nagathihalli Chandrashekar
- Written by: Nagathihalli Chandrashekar
- Produced by: Urmila Babu
- Starring: K. Shivram; Nandini Singh; Prakash Rai
- Cinematography: Mahendra Chittibabu
- Edited by: Suresh Urs
- Music by: Hamsalekha
- Production company: Drishya Kavya Films
- Release date: 1993
- Running time: 123 min
- Country: India
- Language: Kannada

Baa Nalle Madhuchandrake (transl. Come girl to the honeymoon) is a 1993 Indian Kannada-language romantic thriller film, starring K. Shivram and Nandini Singh. The film was directed and written by Nagathihalli Chandrashekar, based on his novel of the same name. It is produced by Urmila Babu for Drishya Kavya Films banner. The film's soundtrack is composed by Hamsalekha.

== Plot ==
Vivek is a writer and gets engaged to a beautiful girl, Preethi. He is madly in love with her and cannot live without her. Days after marriage, the couple travel to Shimla on their honeymoon. Preethi falls from a cliff and dies. Shattered and shocked, Vivek returns home. He becomes totally distraught in life and starts drinking heavily. His friend consoles him every time.

Meanwhile, a police officer arrives from Shimla to investigate the case. He sympathizes with the grief-stricken Vivek and also suspects him. He stays for a long time and does his investigation. Not finding any clues to move forward in the case, he concludes the death was an accident. When returning to Shimla, Vivek meets him at the railway station and says goodbye. The train is delayed and he makes an inquiry in the railway department. Ticket counter guy informed Vivek did booked only 1 ticket while return journey. Police officer gets shocked and chases vivek and asked to surrender. Vivek told reason to killed Preethi and surrendered.

== Cast ==
- K. Shivram as Vivek
- Nandini Singh as Preethi
- Prakash Rai as David
- Sundar Raj as Bus Driver in Mysuru University
- Karibasavaiah as Beggar in Train
- Tennis Krishna in special appearance
- Nagathihalli Chandrashekar in special appearance as Police Inspector in Mysuru
- Padma Kumta as Preethi's Mother
- H. G. Dattatreya as Vivek's Father
- Ashok Rao as Special Police Officer from Shimla
- Maanu as Preethi's Father
- Bhargavi Narayan as Vivek's Mother

== Soundtrack ==
All the songs were composed and scored by Hamsalekha. The soundtrack was received with positive response and the songs gets aired on FM channels.

S. No.	Song title	Singer(s)	Lyrics
1	"Bandaalo Bandaalo"	S. P. Balasubrahmanyam	Nagathihalli Chandrashekar
2	"Oho Himalaya"	S. P. Balasubrahmanyam, Manjula Gururaj	Hamsalekha
3	"Baa Nalle Baa Nalle"	S. P. Balasubrahmanyam, K. S. Chithra	Nagathihalli Chandrashekar
4	"Aa Bettadalli"	S. P. Balasubrahmanyam	Siddalingayya
