= Samskara (film) =

- Directed by: Pattabhirama Reddy
- Screenplay by: Pattabhirama Reddy; Singeetam Srinivasa Rao (also executive director)
- Story by: U. R. Ananthamurthy
- Dialogue by: Girish Karnad
- Produced by: Pattabhirama Reddy
- Starring: Girish Karnad; P. Lankesh; Dasharathi Dixit; B. R. Jayaram; Lakshmi Krishnamurthy; Snehalata Reddy
- Cinematography: Tom Cowan
- Edited by: Steven Cartaw; Vasu
- Music by: Rajeev Taranath
- Distributed by: Rama Manohara Chitra
- Release date: 1970
- Running time: 113 minutes
- Country: India
- Language: Kannada
- Budget: ₹90,000

Samskara ( English title: Funeral Rites) is a 1970 Indian Kannada-language film written by U. R. Ananthamurthy based on his eponymous novel, and directed and produced by Pattabhirama Reddy. Singeetam Srinivasa Rao was executive director for the film. It is considered a path-breaking film that pioneered the parallel cinema movement in Kannada. Samskara won the National Film Award for Best Feature Film (1970).

The word samskara means "ritual" in Kannada. The Madras Censor Board banned Samskara because it was felt that the strong anti-caste message of the film could spark tensions among the public. The ban was revoked by the Union Ministry of Information and Broadcasting. The film was released and it went on to win awards at national and international levels.

== Plot ==
The story is set in a street in a small village called Durvasapura in the Western Ghats of Karnataka. A majority of the people who live in the street belong to the community of Madhwas (a Brahmin community). The people who stay here have a traditional mindset and strictly follow the rules defined by their religion. Two of the main characters in the story are Praneshacharya (Girish Karnad) and Narayanappa. Praneshacharya is a devout Brahmin who has completed his Vedic education at Varanasi and has returned to Duravasapura and is considered as the leader of the Brahmin community of his village and the surrounding ones. His main goal is to attain liberation (moksha) and he is willing to go to any length to achieve it. To remain focused on his goal and as an act of self-sacrifice, he marries an invalid woman, and hence remains celibate.

The other main character, Narayanappa is a Brahmin by birth, but one who has rejected the set rules of Brahminism, by eating meat and by keeping the company of a prostitute named Chandri. Narayanappa and his friends catch the sacred fish in the temple tank and cook and eat them, causing the Brahmins in the village to rise up against him. They approach Praneshacharya to throw him out of the village. Praneshacharya decides against taking this extreme step as he believes that Narayanappa can be convinced to renounce his immoral acts. Narayanappa visits Shimoga, and he returns to Duravasapura with a high fever and dies. The Brahmins are caught in a dilemma, because according to Brahmin principles, a person who dies should be cremated as early as possible. None of the Brahmins wants to cremate Narayanappa's body, as they feel that by doing so they will become polluted, as he was against the Brahmin principles during his life.

However, the Brahmin principles also stipulate that a non-Brahmin cannot cremate the body of a Brahmin. Praneshacharya, being the leader, is responsible for finding the solution to this difficult problem. He reads the holy books, but they do not provide any solution. He then goes to a temple to pray to God and spends a whole day there. Disappointed at not being able to solve the problem, he trudges back home. On his way, he encounters Chandri. He is mesmerised by her beauty and when he wakes up in the middle of the night, he finds himself lying on Chandri's lap. Chandri rushes home, finds that Narayanappa's body has started to rot, gets it cremated in secrecy, and leaves Durvasapura. Praneshacharya is now caught in another dilemma, as to whether he will reveal his immoral act to the people of the village or keep quiet about it. Feeling guilty, he leaves the village, but the guilt never leaves him. Finally deciding to own up to his act, he returns to the village and the story ends there. It's left to the imagination of the viewer on whether Praneshacharya owns up or not.

== Cast ==
- Girish Karnad as Praneshacharya
- Snehalatha Reddy as Chandri
- Jayaram
- P. Lankesh as Narayanappa
- Pradhan
- Dasharathi Dixit
- Lakshmi Krishnamurthy
- Jayadev
- Arbutha Rani
- Lakshmana Rao
- Loknath
- Srikantaiah
- G. Shivananda
- Yashavanth Bhat
- Vilas
- K. Gopi
- Pranesha
- Vasudeva Murthy
- B. R. Shivaram
- Cudavalli Chandrashekar
- C. R. Simha
- Shamanna Shastry
- Balachandra
- Srikanthji
- Ganapathi Shastry
- Appu Rao
- B. S. Rama Rao
- Krishna Bhat
- A. L. Srinivasamurthy
- Goda Ramkumar
- Bhargavi Narayan
- Shanthabai
- Vishalam
- Yamuna Prabhu
- Esthar Ananthamurthy
- Ammu Mathew
- Chamundi
- Kasthuri

== Production ==
The story was written by U. R. Ananthamurthy in 1965, while a student at the University of Birmingham for his Ph.D. He saw the film The Seventh Seal (1957) by Ingmar Bergman and was deeply moved by it. His tutor Malcolm Bradbury suggested he write about his experiences in India concerning the multilayered structure of time in Indian society.

After completing the story, he sent the manuscript to Girish Karnad in India who got in touch with Pattabhirami Reddy and S. G. Vasudev, a painter, both with Madras Players, a Madras-based amateur acting group. Impressed by the theme of the story, Reddy decided to produce and direct it. Vasudev became the art director and also brought in Tom Cowan, a photographer with the Commonwealth Documentation Division, Australia, as the cinematographer. Cowan, in turn, brought his friend Steven Cartaw as the editor. The initial casting for the film was done from the Madras Players before choosing the rest in Bangalore.

The film required a localized dwelling of Brahmins as the setting and Vasudev found one in Vaikunthapura, near Sringeri in Mysore State (now Karnataka). Despite intervention from the Sringeri Sharada Peetham, the makers received cooperation from the locals during filming. In an interview with The Times of India in 2014, Ananthamurthy said, "Vaikunthapura had a population of pure Brahmins. But the women of the agrahara where we shot the movie let Tom [Cowan] enter the kitchen. If the locals had known the theme, they would have never allowed the shooting to take place. They must have regretted it after the film's release. But the place became famous after the movie". Cowan worked for 30 days, shooting 900 shots at an average of 30 shots per day, before the film was completed in a paltry ₹90,000.

Samskara was the first Kannada film to be directed and produced by Pattabhirami Reddy who had mainly dealt with Telugu films. Singeetam Srinivasa Rao was the executive director of the film. The film was also notable for it was the first Kannada film to not use excessive use of cosmetics for the artistes, music and dance, and for being made entirely with an amateur cast, most of whom were poets, writers and journalists. Samskara was initially banned by the Madras Censor Board in late 1969. It was the first Kannada film to receive a ban. The Board however gave no reasons for the ban in its letter to the makers. It was later revoked by the Union Ministry of Information and Broadcasting.

== Awards ==
18th National Film Awards

- Best Feature Film — Pattabhirama Reddy

1970–71 Karnataka State Film Awards

- Second Best Film — Pattabhirama Reddy
- Best Supporting Actor — B. R. Jayaram
- Best Story Writer — U. R. Ananthamurthy
- Best Cinematographer — Tom Cowan

=== International honors ===
- Bronze Leopard at Locarno International Film Festival (1972)
- International Film Festival of India, (1992)
