= Avasthe =

1987 film

- Directed by: Krishna Masadi
- Written by: U. R. Ananthamurthy Novel
- Produced by: Mahima Patel; Esthar Ananthamurthy; Krishna Masadi; Niranjan Patel
- Starring: Anant Nag; J. H. Patel; B. V. Karanth; Archana Vishwanath
- Cinematography: S. Ramachandra
- Edited by: A. Subramanya
- Music by: Vijaya Bhaskar
- Production company: Chiguru Movies
- Release date: 1987
- Running time: 122 minutes
- Country: India
- Language: Kannada

Avasthe is a 1987 Kannada political drama film directed and co-produced by Krishna Masadi and is based on the novel written by the writer U. R. Ananthamurthy. The film starred Anant Nag in the lead role along with a host of real-time politicians like J. H. Patel, D. B. Chandre Gowda, M. P. Prakash and B. K. Chandrashekar in the key roles. Other pivotal roles were played by B. V. Karanth, M. Bhaktavatsala, Chandrashekhara Kambara, Archana and Bhargavi Narayan.

The film's score and songs were composed by Vijaya Bhaskar. The film upon release was well received critically and won multiple awards at the Karnataka State Film Awards for the year 1987–88.

== Cast ==
- Anant Nag as Krishnappa Gowda
- M. P. Prakash as Maheshwaraiah
- M. Bhakthavathsala as Veeranna
- B. V. Karanth as Nameless Sanyasi / Sarpa Siddeshwarananda Swamiji
- J. H. Patel as Chandraiah
- Abdul Nazeer Sab as Reddy
- D. B. Chandre Gowda as Rehman
- Archana Vishwanath as Gowri Deshpande
- Padma Kumta
- Bhargavi Narayan as Krishnappa's Mother
- Lakshmi Chandrashekar as Seetha (Krishnappa's wife)
- B. K. Chandrashekhar as a man on the steps of Vidhana Soudha
- Rajavardhan
- Chandrashekhara Kambara
- G. V. Shivanand as Annaji
- Sundar Raj as Channaveeraiah
- M. C. Anand
- B. S. Achar
- Narayan Rayachur
- Soumya Gowda
- Saroja Srishaila
- Lakshmi Nataraj

== Soundtrack ==
The music was composed by Vijaya Bhaskar. The audio was out on Lahari Music label.

Track listing
No.	Title	Lyrics	Singer(s)	Length
1.	"Dhare Uriva Hagalinali"	Chandrashekhar Kambara	B. R. Chaya
2.	"Mouna Thabbithu Nelava"	Gopalkrishna Adiga	Puttur Narasimha Nayak

== Awards ==
Karnataka State Film Awards 1987-88

- Second Best Film
- Best Actor – Anant Nag
- Best Dialogue Writer – U. R. Ananthamurthy, Krishna Masadi
