= S. N. Sethuram =

- Born: 23 January 1953 (age 73); Hassan
- Occupations: Actor, Director, Playwright, Deputy Commissioner (Ret.) in Income Tax Department, The Government of India.
- Spouse: Vaidehi
- Parent(s): Shri S(Shankha) Narayanaswamy, Smt. Sheshamani
- Relatives: S N Rathnamala, S N Narmada

S N Sethuram is an Indian Kannada TV serial actor, director, playwright and writer.

He was inspired by authors like Leo Tolstoy, Nikolai Gogol, Aleksandr Puskin, Anton Chekov and other Russian authors.

== Works ==
=== Serials ===
- Mayamruga - Actor
- Manthana - Director and Actor
- Anavarana - Director and Actor
- Dibbana - Director and Actor
- Yugantara - Director and Actor

=== Dramas ===
- Nimitta (2013)
- Gati (2014)
- Atheeta (2014)
- Uchchista (2019-Sep-26)
- Sthree (2021-Feb-10)

=== Films ===
- Mathadana (2001)...Putte Gowda
- Stabiliti (2021)

== Awards ==
- Maasti award - 2017

== Literary works ==
- Nimittha Gathi - 2017
- Navalla - 2017
- Dahana - 2018

All books
