= Phalitamsha =

- Directed by: S. R. Puttanna Kanagal
- Written by: Srinivasa Kulakarni
- Screenplay by: S. R. Puttanna Kanagal
- Produced by: Aragal Brothers
- Starring: Aarathi; Jai Jagadish; Shubha; Vaishali Kasaravalli
- Cinematography: B. N. Haridas
- Music by: Vijaya Bhaskar
- Release date: 1976
- Country: India
- Language: Kannada

Phalitamsha ( transl. Result) is a 1976 Indian Kannada-language romantic movie, directed by S. R. Puttanna Kanagal. The movie is based on the story Golagummata by Srinivasa Kulakarni. Produced under the banner of A1 Movietone, the movie was predominantly shot in Bijapur. The movie paired newcomer Jai Jagadish with four heroines. Aarathi as expected has the meatiest role and delivers yet another power-packed performance. Despite a good-looking hero, top notch actresses and beautiful outdoor locales, Phalitamsha remains one of the few flops of ace director Puttana Kanagal's career. The negatives of the movie were lost in fire. The movie was dubbed in Telugu in 1977 as Nannu Preminchu.

== Plot ==
The film traces the phases and meaning of love. In his hometown, our hero (Jai Jagadish) develops a crush on the beautiful Chelvi (Shubha), an innocent village belle, whose adoration, he mistakes as love. When she is married off by her family, he turns to his college friend, the glamorous Chanchala (Vaishali) for solace. Chanchala, a rich girl who pilots her own plane for a hobby, befriends our hero only because he is a successful football player at the college level. When he suffers a leg injury that kills his chances of competing at the state level, she breaks up with him. After finishing college, our hero takes up a bank job and once again mistakes the friendly overtures of his colleague Sarla (Padma Kumata) a simple middle-class girl. When she clarifies her feelings to be platonic, he is disillusioned and agrees to go in for an arranged marriage with Sheela (Aarathi). How the level-headed Sheela makes him understand the true meaning of love forms the second half of this avant-garde film. The haunting melody 'Love Endare' sung by Vani Jairam was widely popular. Amrish Puri and Aruna Irani feature in a song sequence in cameo appearances.

The movie abounds in symbolisms. Right from the names. The hero first mistakes beauty (Chelvi) is love, then attraction that is fickle (Chanchala) is love and next friendship that is simple (Sarla). Finally he realizes love is in the conduct (Sheela). A bullock cart is used as the symbol for the rustic Chelvi, a helicopter for Chanchala and an auto for Sarla.

== Cast ==
This film was debut movie of actor Jai Jagadish.

- Aarathi
- Jai Jagadish
- Shubha
- Vaishali Kasaravalli
- Padma Kumata
- Leelavathi
- Loknath
- Amrish Puri (Sp. App.)
- Aruna Irani (Sp. App.)

== Music ==
- "Love Endare" - Vani Jairam
- "Love Endarenu" - S. P. Balasubrahmanyam
- "Pyateyinda Bandavane" - S. P. Balasubrahmanyam, Vani Jairam
- "Ee Chendina Aata" - S. P. Balasubrahmanyam, P. Susheela
- "Annorella Annali" - S. Janaki

Nannu Preminchu (Telugu Version)

- "Maatakari Pillagada" - S. P. Balasubrahmanyam, P. Susheela
- "Ee Allari Aata" - S. P. Balasubrahmanyam, vani Jairam
- "Love Antemo Edo Anukunnanu" - S. P. Balasubrahmanyam
- "Love Annadi Ilalo Mayani Pennidi" - Vani Jairam
