= K. Shivram =

Indian actor, politician and bureaucrat (1953–2024)

President of Chalavadi Mahasabha
- In office 2011–2016
- Preceded by: Position established
- Succeeded by: H.P. Kumar

Officer of Indian Administrative Service
- In office 1986–2013

Personal details
- Born: Shivaramu Kempaiah; 6 April 1953 Uragahalli, Bangalore Rural district, Mysore State, India (now in Ramanagara district, Karnataka)
- Died: 29 February 2024 (aged 70) Bangalore, India
- Party: Bharatiya Janata Party (2016–2024)
- Other political affiliations: Indian National Congress (2013–2014); Janata Dal (Secular) (2014); Indian National Congress (2014–2016)
- Spouse: Vani Shivram
- Parents: S. Kempaiah; Chikka Boramma
- Relatives: Pradeep Bogadi (Son in law)
- Education: V. V. Puram Evening College of Arts & Commerce (B.A.).; Mysore Open University (M.A.).
- Occupation: Actor, politician and bureaucrat
- Website: Official Website

Shivaramu Kempaiah (6 April 1953 – 29 February 2024), better known by the name K. Shivram, was an Indian actor, politician, and bureaucrat.

== Early life and education ==
K. Shivramu was born on 6 April 1953 at Uragalli, Bangalore south District. His father was a talented drama master, the late S. Kempaiah, and his mother was Chikkaboramma. Having completed his primary schooling in his village, he moved to Bangalore and studied high school at Malleshwaram Government School. During 1972, right after his high schooling, he completed his typing and shorthand course both in English and Kannada and got into a government job. In May 1973, he joined the Crime Investigation Department as a police reporter. While in service, he continued his studies and got a Bachelor of Arts degree from V. V. Puram Evening College of Arts & Commerce. He got a Master of Arts (History) degree through correspondence from the open university of Mysore in the year 1982. In 1985, he cleared the K.A.S. exam and was selected as Deputy superintendent of Police. In the year 1986, he secured first rank among the Scheduled Caste community in the Karnataka Administrative Service exam and got selected as Assistant commissioner of police. While he was undergoing training at Karnataka Police Academy, he cleared the civil services exam (UPSC) and was selected for the I.A.S. which had been his childhood dream. He also held the distinction of being the first person in India to clear the IAS Exam in the Kannada Language.

== Political career ==
In 2013, K. Shivramu joined the Indian National Congress after retirement from his position as Bangalore Regional Commissioner.

In 2014, he was a Janata Dal (Secular) member and contested Bijapur Lok Sabha constituency and lost the election against Ramesh Jigajinagi.

In 2014, he again rejoined the Indian National Congress in support of getting the Deputy Chief Minister's post for any Dalit leader, which led to "a controversy of supporting Dr G. Parameshwar".

On 14 October 2016, he joined the Bharatiya Janata Party after failing to recognise a Dalit in a higher place in Indian National Congress politics.

== Health issues and death ==
Shivram was battling multiple health issues and was undergoing treatment. He died of a heart attack on 29 February 2024, at the age of 70.

== Filmography ==
Year	Film	Role	Ref.
1993	Baa Nalle Madhuchandrake	Vivek	
1996	Vasantha Kavya	Vasanth	
1997	Sangliyana Part–3		
1999	Prathibhatane	As Writer	
1999	Khalanayaka		
2001	Yarige Beda Duddu		
2003	Game For Love	Surya	
2006	Naaga	Nagaraja	
2007	O Prema Devathe		
2017	Tiger	Shivram Nayak	
