= Mr. Mommaga =

- Promotional poster
- Directed by: N. Ragavan
- Written by: N. Ragavan; Malavalli Saikrishna (dialogues)
- Based on: Manjapai (Tamil) by N. Ragavan
- Produced by: Ragu Gowda; Ravi Gowda
- Starring: Rangayana Raghu; Ravi Gowda; Oviya
- Cinematography: Raasamathi
- Music by: N. R. Raghunanthan
- Production company: Sumukha Enterprises
- Release date: 28 May 2016
- Country: India
- Language: Kannada

Mr. Mommaga (transl. Mr. Grandson) is a 2016 Indian Kannada-language drama film directed by N. Ragavan and starring Rangayana Raghu, Ravi Gowda and Oviya. A remake of director's own Tamil film Manjapai (2014), it was released on 28 May 2016.

== Cast ==
- Rangayana Raghu as Ravi's grandfather
- Ravi Gowda as Ravi
- Oviya as Ramya
- Avinash as Ramya's father
- Kuri Prathap as Auto driver
- Bullet Prakash as Traffic Inspector
- M. N. Lakshmi Devi
- Yuvina Parthavi as Anjali
- Satyajith as Eye Doctor
- Srinath Vasishta as Ravi's boss
- Malavalli Saikrishna as Ramana
- Yathiraj as Company employee

== Soundtrack ==
The soundtrack was composed by N. R. Raghunanthan. The film's audio was released with at a ceremony in April 2016, with film industry personalities including Ganesh, Duniya Vijay, and Amulya sharing the stage with political attendees such as H. D. Kumaraswamy.

Track listing
| No. | Title | Lyrics | Singer(s) | Length |
|---|---|---|---|---|
| 1. | "Vaara Vaara" | V. Nagendra Prasad | Vijay Prakash, Varijashree | 3:55 |
| 2. | "Battalu Kannali" | V. Nagendra Prasad | Rajesh | 4:23 |
| 3. | "Jagavae Preethi" | Malavalli Sai Krishna | Faiz Khan | 3:37 |
| 4. | "Akasha Chandramma" | Malavalli Sai Krishna | S. P. Balasubrahmanyam | 4:24 |
| 5. | "Ayyo Ayyo" | V. Nagendra Prasad | Priya Himesh, Dimple, Sri Gowri, Vaishnavi, Prashasthi, Keerthana, Ruchitha | 3:39 |
| Total length: | | | | 19:58 |

== Reception ==
The film was released on 28 May 2016 across Karnataka. A critic from Times of India gave the film a positive review, noting that "this comic film is worth a watch, if you like a hearty dose of comedy with some little bit of weeps too". A reviewer from Chitratara noted "it is Rangayana Raghu variety of performances makes you to sit in the theatres and watch".
