= Professor Huchuraya =

- VCD cover
- Directed by: M. R. Vittal
- Written by: Narendra Babu
- Produced by: Narasimharaju
- Starring: Vishnuvardhan; Manjula; R. Nagendra Rao; Narasimharaju
- Cinematography: Annayya; L Mallik
- Edited by: T P Velayudham; N C Rajan
- Music by: Rajan–Nagendra
- Production company: Srikantha Chithra
- Release date: 1974
- Running time: 149 minutes
- Country: India
- Language: Kannada

Professor Huchuraya is a 1974 Indian Kannada-language comedy-drama film directed by M. R. Vittal and produced by actor Narasimharaju. The story is written by Narendra Babu. Besides Narasimharaju as the protagonist, the film features Vishnuvardhan, Manjula, R. Nagendra Rao and Balakrishna in prominent roles. The film was widely appreciated for its songs and story upon release. The songs tuned by Rajan–Nagendra were huge hits.

== Cast ==
- Narasimharaju as Prof. Huchuraya
- Vishnuvardhan as Venu
- Manjula as Geetha
- R. Nagendra Rao as Shama Shastry, Huchuraya's uncle
- Balakrishna as Colonel Dhanley, Venu's father
- Dwarakish as Thimma
- Bhargavi Narayan as Meera
- Leelavathi as Indira
- Vaishali Kasaravalli as Kamali
- Rajashankar as a constable
- Lokanath as Dr. Manjesh
- Shyam
- Ranga

== Soundtrack ==
The music of the film was composed by Rajan–Nagendra. The song "Doora Doora" was received extremely well.

Track listing
No.	Title	Lyrics	Singer(s)	Length
1.	"Hare Rama Hare Krishna"	Ku. Ra. See	S. P. Balasubrahmanyam & L. R. Eswari
2.	"Doora Doora Alle Nilli"	R. N. Jayagopal	P. B. Sreenivas & P. Susheela
3.	"Hello My Boy"	Ku. Ra. See	L. R. Eswari
4.	"Koodi Bandide Kankana"	Nagendra Babu	S. P. Balasubrahmanyam & P. Leela

== Awards ==
- Karnataka State Film Award for Best Supporting Actress – Bhargavi Narayan
