= Tikkavarapu Pattabhirama Reddy =

Indian film director (1919–2006)

- Born: 19 February 1919; Nellore, Madras Presidency, British India
- Died: 6 May 2006 (aged 87)
- Education: Visva-Bharati University; University of Calcutta; Columbia University
- Occupations: writer, producer, director, social activist
- Known for: Samskara; Chandamarutha
- Spouse: Snehalata Reddy
- Relatives: Ramana Reddy; T. Subbarami Reddy

Tikkavarapu Pattabhirama Reddy (19 February 1919 – 6 May 2006) was an Indian film screenwriter, producer, director, social activist, poet, and writer known for his pioneering works in Telugu cinema, and Kannada cinema.

Reddy has received three National Film Awards for his works. In 1972 he produced and directed Samskara which garnered the National Film Award for Best Feature Film and Bronze Leopard at the Locarno International Film Festival. Reddy has actively participated the Indian Emergency opposition movement, human rights movement, and child labor movements as founder member of People's Union for Civil Liberties. In 1977, he produced and directed the bilingual Chandamarutha in Kannada, and English. The film was banned during the Emergency, and was later released to critical appreciation.

== Personal life ==
Pattabhirama Reddy was born in Nellore, Andhra Pradesh into a Telugu speaking family. He studied at Visva-Bharati University, University of Calcutta and Columbia University. He was married to Snehalata Reddy, and founded the organisation Concerned for Working Children. In 2003, he directed In the Hour of God, a play based on Sri Aurobindo's classic Savitri, inspired by the mythical woman who defied death for love, which he dedicated to his wife Snehalata Reddy. Pattabhirama Reddy died on 6 May 2006, at the age of 87.

== Literature ==
- Fidelu Ragala Dozen (1939), (Telugu)
- Kaitha Naa Dayita (1978), (Telugu)
- Pattabhi Pun-changam (1980), (Telugu)

== Selected filmography ==
As producer and director

- Note: all films are in Kannada, except where noted.
- Samskara (1970)
- Chanda Marutha (1977)
- Wild Wind (1977, English)
- Devara Kaadu (1993)
- Sringara Masa (1984)

As executive producer

- Note: all films are in Telugu.
- Pellinaati Pramanalu (1958)
- Sri Krishnarjuna Yuddhamu (1963)
- Bhagya Chakramu (1965)

== Awards and honors ==
National Film Awards

- National Film Award for Best Feature Film - Samskara (Kannada) - 1971 (Director and Producer)
- National Film Award for Best Film on Environment Conservation/Preservation - Devara Kadu - 1992 (Director and Producer)

Karnataka State Film Awards

- Karnataka State Film Award for Second Best Film - Samskara - 1971 (Director and Producer)

== International honors ==
- Bronze Leopard at Locarno International Film Festival (1972)

== State honors ==
- Puttanna Kanagal Award from the Government of Karnataka
- Honorary Doctorate from Andhra University
