= Chomana Dudi =

1975 film

- DVD cover
- Directed by: B. V. Karanth
- Based on: Chomana Dudi by Shivaram Karanth
- Produced by: Praja Films
- Starring: M. V. Vasudeva Rao; Padma Kumta
- Cinematography: S. Ramachandra
- Edited by: P. Bhaktavatsalam
- Music by: B. V. Karanth
- Release date: 1975
- Running time: 141 minutes
- Country: India
- Language: Kannada

Chomana Dudi (transl. Choma's Drum) is a 1975 Indian Kannada-language drama film directed by B. V. Karanth and starring M. V. Vasudeva Rao and Padma Kumta. It is based on the eponymous novel by Shivaram Karanth. The film was released 1975 and won the Swarna Kamal, India's National Award for the best film. This was also the first Kannada film to feature a reference to the demigod Panjurli.

== Plot ==
Choma is an untouchable bonded-labourer in a village who is working along with his family for a landlord, as he belongs to a backward class. Due to his social status, he is not allowed to till his own land, something that he desires most. Though he managed to rear a pair of bullocks that he found straying in the forest, he cannot use them to till the land. He comes in contact of Christian missionaries who try to convert him giving him the lure of the land, but Choma does not want to let go of his faith. He releases the fury that fate has beset on him, by beating his drum.

He has four sons and a daughter; two of his elder sons work in a distant coffee estate trying to pay off the debt. One of the sons dies of malaria and the other one converts to Christianity by marrying a Christian girl. His daughter, Belli works in the plantation and falls for the charm of Manvela, the estate-owner's writer. She is raped by the estate owner, who then writes off Choma's debt. She returns to Choma's home telling him of the reality. His youngest son drowns in a river, with nobody coming to save him because of him being an untouchable. He then finds his daughter in a compromising position with Manvela. With anger, he beats her and kicks her out of the house. To defy his fate, he starts tilling a piece of land and then chases off his bullock into the forest. In the climax, Choma shuts himself in his house and starts playing the drum till he dies.

== Cast ==
- M. V. Vasudeva Rao as Choma
- Padma Kumta as Belli
- Jayarajan as Chania
- Sundar Raj as Gurava
- M. V. Nagaraj as Kala
- Nagendra as Neela
- Honnaiah
- Govind Bhat

== Awards ==
- National Film Award for Best Feature Film (1976)
- National Film Award for Best Actor - M. V. Vasudeva Rao (1976)
- National Film Award for Best Story – K Shivaram Karanth

Karnataka State Film Awards 1975–76

- First Best Film
- Best Actor – M V Vasudev Rao
- Best Supporting Actress – Padma Kumata
- Best Story Writer – Shivaram Karanth
- Best Screenplay – Shivaram Karanth
- Best Sound Recording – Krishnamurthy
