= Tiger (2017 film) =

2017 Indian Kannada-language action film

- theatrical release poster
- Directed by: Nanda Kishore
- Written by: Yoganand Muddan (dialogues)
- Screenplay by: Tharun Sudhir; Uday
- Produced by: Chikkaboramma
- Starring: Pradeep; Nyra Banerjee; K. Shivram
- Cinematography: Sudhakar S. Raj
- Edited by: K. M. Prakash
- Music by: Arjun Janya
- Production company: Inchara Film Factory
- Distributed by: Jack Manjunath (Mysore Talkies)
- Release date: 16 June 2017
- Running time: 155 minutes
- Country: India
- Language: Kannada

Tiger is a 2017 Indian Kannada-language action film directed by Nanda Kishore and produced by Chikkaboramma under Inchara Film Factory. The film stars Pradeep, Nyra Banerjee and K. Shivram, alongside Om Puri, P. Ravishankar, Chikkanna and Sadhu Kokila. The music was composed by Arjun Janya, while the cinematography and editing were handled by Sudhakar S. Raj and K. M. Prakash.

Tiger was released on 16 June 2017. The film was dubbed in Hindi as Policewale ki Jung.

== Plot ==
The movie Tiger is a Kannada action packed thriller film led by the young star Pradeep (protagonist) who dreams to become a police officer which is against the wish of his father played by the well known actor and also a very famous Ex IAS officer K Shivram. Why is the father against the wish and the dream of his son is the crux of the story.

== Cast ==
- Pradeep as Ashok Nayak
- Nyra Banerjee as Gowri
- K. Shivram as Shivram Nayak
- Om Puri as Oriya
- P. Ravi Shankar as Shankar Narayan
- Chikkanna as Bahubali
- Sadhu Kokila as Kharjura
- Rangayana Raghu as Lion Linga
- Sonia Agarwal as Lakshmi
- Raj Deepak Shetty as MLA
- Rajesh Nataranga

== Production ==
In August 2014 Pradeep, Tharun Kishore Sudhir and Nanda Kishore Decided to a project together. Tharun kishore Sudhir wrote the script just for Pradeep and his elder brother Nanda Kishora decided to Direct. The film was started under the banner of Inchara Film Factory which produced its first film under the producer Smt. Chikkaboramma. This is the last appearance of the Indian actor Om Puri on a Kannada film before his death.

== Soundtrack ==
Arjun Janya has composed the soundtrack and background music for the film. The soundtrack album consists of six songs. Lyrics for the tracks were written by V. Nagendra Prasad, Yogaraj Bhat, Yoganand Muddan and Lokesh Krishna. Deciding to tie up with a music label the producers released the album in November 2016 under Lahari Music company. The audio was released by the Ex chief minister of Karnataka Shri B. S. Yeddyurappa.

No.	Title	Artist(s)	Length
1.	"Tiger Tiger"	Sudeepa	4:03
2.	"Beladingla Ratri"	Sonu Nigam, Anuradha Bhat	3:59
3.	"Tinnada Unnada"	Vijay Prakash	4:05
4.	"Item Song Agbeku Ban"	Manjula Gururaj	4:15
5.	"Ganapathi Jai"	Shankar Mahadevan	4:42
6.	"Bottom Of My Heart"	Sunil Raoh, Priyanka	2:52

== Reception ==
A critic from Cinema Express wrote that "Go for Tiger, if you are one of those who enjoy mass entertainers". A critic from The Times of India rated the film three out of five and wrote that "This film can interest those who like the old school brand of commercial cinema. Though, take enough snacks along as the film's length is a tad longer than it should have ideally been". A critic from Bangalore Mirror wrote that "Tiger is a comeback for both Pradeep and retired IAS officer".
