= Padma Kumta =

Indian Kannada actress

- Born: Karnataka, India
- Died: 6 March 2017 (aged 58); Bangalore, India
- Occupation: Film actress
- Children: 3

Padma Kumta or Padma Kumata was an Indian actress who worked in the Kannada film industry. Some of her notable films include Chomana Dudi (1975), Bayalu Daari (1976), Phalitamsha (1976), Avasthe (1987) and Arivu (2017). She died of a cardiac arrest.

== Awards ==
Year	Award	Film	Credit	Category	Result
1975–76	Karnataka State Film Awards	Chomana Dudi	Actress	Best Supporting Actress	Won

== Career ==
Padma Kumta has been part of more than thirty movies, and many serials/soaps in Kannada, including Manthana.

== Selected filmography ==
- Chomana Dudi (1975)...Belli
- Phalitamsha (1976)...Sarala
- Bayalu Daari (1976)...Katyayini
- Arivu (1979)...Geetha
- Mouna Geethe (1986)
- Shiva Mecchida Kannappa (1988)...Chenni
- Sri Venkateshwara Mahime (1988)
- Devatha Manushya (1988)...Kaveramma
- Sindhoora Thilaka (1992)
- Solillada Saradara (1992)...Bhadra
- Bevu Bella (1993)
- Bhagavan Sri Saibaba (1993)...Devagiri
- Nan Hendthi Chennagidale (2000)...Ramu's Mother
- Janumada Gelathi (2008)
- Allide Nammane Illi Bande Summane (2011)
- Lucky (2012)

== See also ==
- List of people from Karnataka
- Cinema of Karnataka
- List of Indian film actresses
- Cinema of India
