= T. N. Seetharam =

Indian film and television director

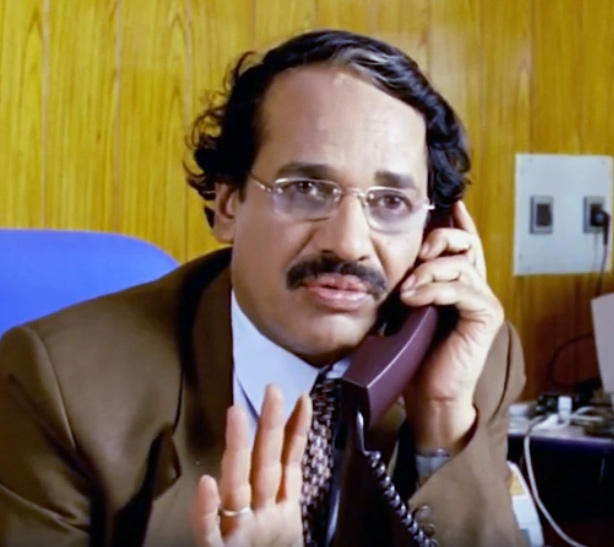
- Seetharam in Beru (2005)
- Born: 6 December 1948 (age 77); Talagavara, Chintamani Taluk Chikkaballapur district Mysore State, (now Karnataka)
- Occupations: Director, Producer, Actor, Screenwriter
- Spouse: Geetha
- Children: Satyajith, Ashwini
- Parent(s): Narayan Rao; Sundaramma

Thalagavara Narayanarao Seetharam (born 6 December 1948) is a prominent Kannada film and TV serial director, actor and screenwriter. He has become a cultural icon in Karnataka, India, through his work in several art mediums. Seetharam has written, directed, and produced plays, movies, and top-rated television series which have attracted millions of viewers.

== Early life ==
Seetharam was born on 6 December 1948 in Thalagavara village near the Doddaballapura town in the erstwhile Mysore State. He was the third child to his parents Narayanrao and Sundaramma. He completed his high school education in Doddaballapur Municipal School, Doddaballapura, and pre-university course in National College, Bangalore. He then obtained his degree in Bachelor of Science before obtaining his bachelor's degree in Law. This was when he decided to take keen interest in plays, having worked with playwright P. Lankesh during the time. Seetharam decided to stay in Bangalore after completing his education, by participating in plays. He rejected his father's request to return to his village and involve himself in agriculture and to practice as a lawyer. Having been influenced by Lankesh and U. R. Ananthamurthy, he believed owning a piece of land is a sin. Saddened by his decision, his father, a patient, stopped consuming medicine and died shortly thereafter leaving Seetharam with guilt. In 2014, during his appearance in the talk show Weekend with Ramesh, Seetharam said that many of his plays were made as tributes to his father and his television serials were made as tributes to women, inspired mainly by his deceased sister, Padma.

== Career ==
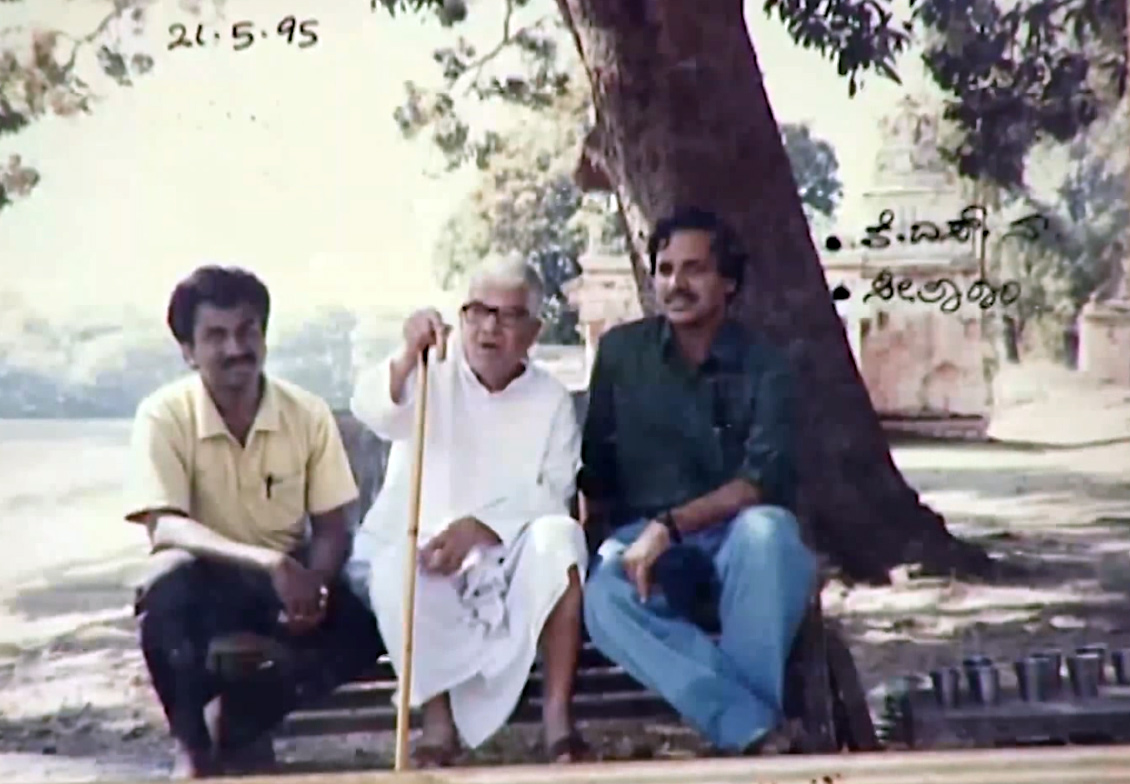
P.Sheshadri, K. S. Narasimhaswamy and T.N. Seetharam, during the making of Mayamruga

Seetharam began his career as an associate to playwright and film director, P. Lankesh. He played a pivotal role in the Lankesh directed National Award winning film Pallavi (1976). He was also associated with the famous director Puttanna Kanagal and had written scripts for his movies. He also made appearances as an actor in some movies. He was noticed when he started directing TV serials for Doordarshan. Fame and recognition came when he directed Mayamruga, a daily Kannada serial which stood apart for its take on reality. Mayamruga has seen a DVD avatar, probably a first for a Kannada serial. He then went on to direct Kamanabillu which was the first serial on a satellite TV to be watched widely His association with ETV Kannada resulted in famous serials like Manvantara and Muktha. He has acted in most of his serials and he likes to play the character of a lawyer who comes to the rescue of the oppressed.

He developed a concept of Samvada, wherein he held organised meetings with his audience throughout Karnataka. These became so popular that ETV Kannada telecasted these interactions as well.

He was the president of Karnataka State Film Awards jury for the year 2006.Currently hosting Popular TV shows 'Nanu Mukhyamantri' in newsfirst channel.

== Filmography ==
=== Films ===
Year	Film	Notes
1982	Maanasa Sarovara	Dialogues
1983	Dharani Mandala Madhyadolage	Acting
1990	Panchama Veda	Dialogues
1996	Kraurya	Story, Screenplay
2001	Mathadana	Direction
2005	Beru	Acting
2007	Meera Madhava Raghava	Story, Dialogues, Screenplay and Direction
2016	Vaastu Prakaara	Acting
2017	Kaafi Thota	Story, Screenplay and Direction
2018	Dhwaja	Acting

=== Television ===
Year	Title	Television	Note
1990	Sankalana	Doordarshan	
1991	Navellaru Onde	Doordarshan	
1994	Pattedari Prabhakar	Doordarshan	
1995	Mukha Mukhi	Doordarshan	
1995	College Taranga	Doordarshan	
1998	Mayamruga	Doordarshan	Jointly directed with P. Sheshadri & Nagendra Shaa
1998	Jwalamukhi	Udaya TV	Also director
2001	Manvantara	ETV Kannada	Also director
2003	Dashavataara	ETV Kannada	Also director
2004	Male Billu	ETV Kannada	
2004	Muktha	ETV Kannada	Also director
2006	Mohini Vs Mahalinga	ETV Kannada	
2007	Minchu	ETV Kannada	
2008–2010	Muktha Muktha		Also director
2013–2014	Maha Parva		Also director
2016	Drama Juniors	Zee Kannada	Show judge for Season 1& 2
2018–2020	Magalu Janaki	Colors Super	Also director
2022	Mathe Mayamruga	Siri Kannada	Jointly directed with P. Sheshadri & Nagendra Shaa

=== Dramas ===
- Nammolagobba Naajukayya
- Baduka Mannisu Prabhuve
- Asphota

== Awards ==
- 1989–90 - Karnataka State Film Award for Best Dialogue Writer – Panchama Veda (1990)
- 2000 - National Film Award for Best Feature Film in Kannada – Mathadana
- 2005 - Karnataka State Government's 'Aryabhata Awards': 'Best Director' award for the direction of the teleserial Mukta.
