= H. K. Narasimha Murthy =

- Genre: Carnatic music
- Occupation: violinist
- Instrument: violin

H. K. Narasimhamurthy is a Carnatic violinist.

== Life and career ==
Sri H.K. Narasimha Murthy is a senior and leading violinist hailing from Mysore. He is regarded as an able performer and as an accomplished teacher by fellow musicians, critics, students and music-lovers .

Sri Narasimha Murthy's acumen was shaped by his training in the Parur school of violin. He learned under Sri Parur Sundaram Iyer, and later from his sons M. S. Anantharaman and Sri M. S. Gopalakrishnan. He also came under the influence of many musicians of the day, during his education at the Central College of Music, Madras, from where he obtained the degree of Sangeetha Vidwan.

Sri Narasimha Murthy's abilities were recognized early. He won the first prize at the prestigious All India Radio competition, nearly forty years ago. He has since served the organization with great distinction, having been employed as Staff Artiste at AIR, Mysore for several years, earning its ‘A-Top’ grade.

Sri Narasimha Murthy has worked with a number of musicians of earlier generations, including Sri Maharajapuram Viswanatha Iyer, Sri Chembai Vaidyanatha Bhagavathar, Sri Semmangudi Srinivasa Iyer, Smt.D.K.Pattamal, Sri D. K. Jayaraman, and many of the living legends such as Dr.M. Balamuralikrishna, Sri K.J.Yesudas, Sri T.V.Shankaranarayan, Sri T. N. Seshagopalan, Sri K.S.Gopalakrishnan and the Bombay Sisters, Smt.Saroja and Smt. Lalitha. He has also won many fans abroad, beginning with his debut visit to the USA about thirty years ago, accompanying the Bombay Sisters.

== Teacher ==
The credentials of Sri H.K. Narasimha Murthy ("HKN Sir"), as he is widely known, continue to contribute to the preservation and transmission of the Parur style of violin through his teaching. Alongside his career as a performer, he has played a significant role as a teacher, training numerous students in Carnatic violin. His dedication to teaching and his commitment to sharing his knowledge have earned him recognition within the Carnatic music community.

Mastering the violin is widely regarded as a demanding pursuit, and imparting that knowledge effectively to students presents its own challenges. Over the years, Sri Murthy has trained a large number of violinists, many of whom have gone on to establish successful careers as performers. Among his notable disciples are Sri H.N. Bhaskar, Sri Mysore Srikanth, Aditi Krishnaprakash, and Kum. H.M. Smitha, all of whom have gained recognition in the field of Carnatic music. More than fifty of his students have pursued music professionally, reflecting the lasting impact of his contribution as a teacher.

Adding to his contributions to the cause of music, is his role in founding the Sri Thyagaraja Sangeetha Sabha, which he has served for over two and a half decades, making it one of the most respected organizations in Mysore.

== Awards and titles ==
H.K.Narasimha Murthy has won several awards such as "VISHESHA ACHARYA" award and "The Pappa Venkataramiah Award".
