= Beru (film) =

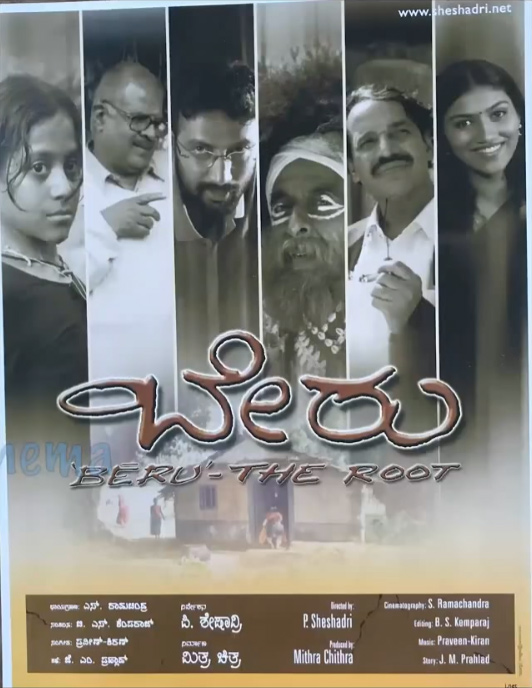
- Film Poster
- Directed by: P. Sheshadri
- Screenplay by: J.M.Prahlad; P.Sheshadri
- Produced by: M/S Mitrachitra
- Starring: H.G.Dattatreya; Suchendra Prasad; Neeta; T.N.Seetharam
- Cinematography: S. Ramachandra
- Edited by: B.S.Kemparaju
- Music by: Pravin Godkhindi
- Release date: 4 March 2005
- Running time: 109 minutes
- Country: India
- Language: Kannada

Beru (transl. Root) is a 2005 Indian Kannada language satirical film directed by P. Sheshadri starring Suchendra Prasad, H. G. Dattatreya, Neethu and M. P. Venkatarao.

The film was awarded the National Film Award for Best Feature Film in Kannada at the 52nd National Film Awards.

== Concept ==
A governing system, big or small, is meant for service to people and development activities. But the degradation of moral values, lack of commitment, and the overall apathy of the public to the commissions and omissions of the system can lead to dangerous situations. The system may degenerate into self-seeking and -protecting power centers instead of being proactive service centers. When that happens, the system becomes breeding ground of corruption and scandals, manipulations and cover-ups. That leaves little time for bureaucracy to look into the basic objectives of ‘service’ and ‘development’. Even honest individuals who want to do good get sucked into this stinking system. In time, the whole system becomes insensitive and indifferent to the nagging problems of common people, resulting in mounting miseries. This is a situation in which the zone of tolerance of the common people starts shrinking. One untoward incident is enough to kindle the spark of rejection of the system.

Beru (The Root) is an attempt to give a wake-up call to raise the consciousness of society about many such issues.

Film trailer

== Plot ==
A taluk-level office has been functioning without a regular head for some time. A junior level official is in charge of the office. It has stuck to mandatory minimal ‘routine’ work.

Goravayya is a poor, old, folk artist. Though living on a small income, he has been magnanimous in his own way to provide shelter to an orphan girl. He is stuck with a problem. The roots of a tree are affecting the stability of his small shelter. He has been repeatedly requesting the office for permission to fell the tree. ‘Come later’ has been the standard reply.

At last, a regular officer arrives on posting. Being sincere and enthusiastic, this new officer starts tuning the office for proactive working. Even before he settles down, a minister's visit is announced. Arrangements have to be made in the Inspection Bungalow (IB). Much to his shock and surprise, nobody in the office knows about the IB! In the process of locating this IB, a scandal unfolds. The IB exists only on records: It is not there physically. Many irregularities and misappropriations come to light. The new officer is not able to report the matter to higher-ups because of his own indiscretion and emotional considerations. He tries to cover up by seeking approval for demolition of the ‘dilapidated’ (non-existent) IB and for building a new one.

Meanwhile, the minister's visit is canceled. But by then, the officer is deeply involved in the cover-up story. He is about to face the consequences. But his influential father-in-law comes to his rescue. He is asked to provide some cooked-up reasons for the IB's ‘present’ condition so that the matter can be hushed up, and he is saved. Goravayya is proposed to be implicated as the ‘servant looking after IB’ responsible for its present condition. On seeing the reluctance of the officer to go ahead with this proposal, the junior official takes the responsibility for coaxing Goravayya for his being implicated. They go to see Goravayya only to find that his shelter has collapsed.

== Cast ==
- H. G. Dattatreya as Venkateshaiah
- Neethu as Suma
- T.N. Seetharam as district collector
- Suchendra Prasad as Raghunandan
- M.P. Venkatarao as Goravayya
- Lakshmi Chandrashekar as mad woman
- Vidya Murthy as Kamalamma
- Baby Sowmya as Gowri
- Shivakumar as peon

== Reception ==
R. G. Vijayasarathy of Rediff.com said that "Overall, Beru acts as a wake up call about the dangers of an inefficient administration".

== Awards ==
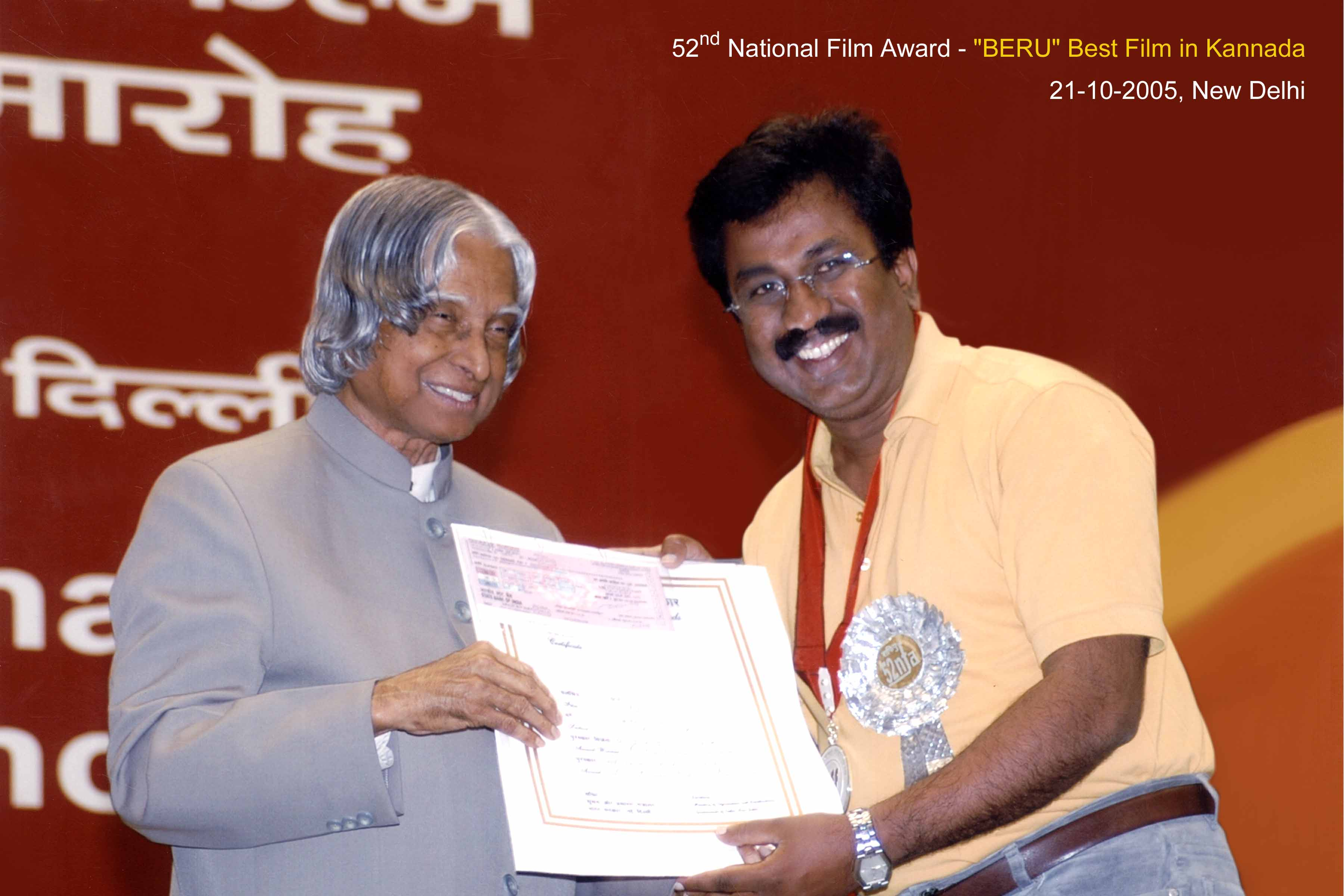
P. Sheshadri receiving the National Film Award for Best Feature Film in Kannada from President A. P. J. Abdul Kalam

- 2004: 52nd National Film Awards: Best Film in Kannada: Beru
- 2004-05 Karnataka State Film Awards
  - 2nd Best Film
  - Best Lyricist - Krishnamurthy Hanur and Lakshmipathi Kolar
