= Bhargavi Narayan =

Indian actress (1938–2022)

- Born: 4 February 1938; Bangalore, Kingdom of Mysore, British Raj (in present-day Karnataka, India)
- Died: 14 February 2022 (aged 84); Bangalore, Karnataka, India
- Education: Maharani's College, Bengaluru
- Occupation: Actress
- Spouse: Belavadi Nanjundaiah Narayana
- Children: 4; including Prakash and Sudha
- Relatives: Samyukta Hornad (granddaughter)

Bhargavi Narayan (4 February 1938 – 14 February 2022) was an Indian actress in the Kannada film industry, and a theatre artist in Karnataka, India. Her notable films include Professor Huchuraya, Eradu Kanasu, Hanthakana Sanchu, Pallavi Anupallavi, and Baa Nalle Madhuchandrake.

== Career ==
Narayan has been a part of more than 22 films and many drama (theatre) plays in Kannada, including the television series Manthana and Mukta. She has written and directed plays for AIR's women's programs and Women's Association for Children, Karnataka. She has worked as a member of Kannada Natak Academy.

Before beginning her career in the arts, Narayan worked as a manager in ESI Corporation, Bengaluru.

She wrote a book in Kannada, called Naa Kanda Nammavaru, published by Ankita Pustaka, Bengaluru.

Narayan was a speaker at the Bangalore Literature Festival 2018, Bengaluru.

== Personal life and death ==
Bhargavi was born on 4 February 1938 to Naamagiriyamma and M. Ramaswamy.

She was married to Belavadi Nanjundaiah Narayana, a.k.a. Makeup Nani (3 November 1929 – 4 December 2003), who was a Kannada film actor and makeup artist. They have four children: Sujatha, Prakash, Pradeep and Sudha. Prakash is an Indian theater, film, television and media personality, and a National Film Award recipient, for his directorial film Stumble in 2002. He is married to Chandrika, and their children are namely Meghana and Teju. Sudha, a Kannada film actress and theatre artist, is married to M. G. Satya and their children are Shantanu and Samyukta. Samyukta is also a Kannada film actress.

Narayan's autobiography, Naanu, Bhargavi ("I am, Bhargavi"), was released in 2012, by publisher Ankita Pustaka, Bengaluru. The book won awards from Karnataka State Sahitya Academy, Karnataka Sangha, Shimoga and Srimati Gangamma Somappa Bommai Pratishthana, Dharwad, Karnataka.

She died in Jayanagar, Bangalore on 14 February 2022, at the age of 84.

== Awards ==
- Karnataka State Film Awards – Best Supporting Actress (1974–75) – credit: actress in film Professor Huchuraya
- Karnataka State Nataka Academy Awards (1998) – credit: theatre/drama works
- Mangalore Prestigious Message Award – credit: screenplay, dialogue writer for Kannada serial: Kavalodeda Daari
- Alva's Nudisiri Awards (2005) – credit: theatre/drama works
- Karnataka State drama contest – best actress (twice)
- Karnataka State children drama contest (1974–75) – state level award – credit: scriptwriter and director for drama: Bhoothayyana Pechata

== Selected filmography ==
- Subba Shastry (1967)
- Professor Huchuraya (1974)
- Pallavi (1976)
- Muyyi (1979)
- Anthima Ghatta (1987)
- Jamboo Savari (1993)
- Mussanje (2001)
- Stumble (2003)
- Kaada Beladingalu (2007)
- Uttama Villain (2015; Tamil)
- Idolle Ramayana (2016)
- Eradane Sala (2017)...Radha
- Raajakumara (2018)
- Premier Padmini (2019)
- Butterfly (2019)
- 777 Charlie (2022)

== See also ==
- List of people from Karnataka
- Cinema of Karnataka
- List of Indian film actresses
- Cinema of India
