= Srinath Vasishta =

- Occupations: Actor, Director and Writer

Srinath Vasishta is an Indian actor, writer, director, stand-up comedian and dubbing artist who appears mainly in Kannada language films and serials.

== Filmography ==
=== Films ===
As an actor

- 3 Gante 30 Dina 30 Second
- Bhagavadgita
- Bombeyata
- Harakeya Kuri
- Kraurya
- Maha Edabidangi
- Mr. Mommaga
- Naa Ninna Mareyalare
- RangiTaranga
- Ravana
- Shubra
- Tapori

As a director

- Dr. Sukanya
- Manthana
- Salila

As a dubbing artist

- Bachchan (2013 film) (for Nassar (actor))

=== Serials ===
As a writer

- Male Billu
- Mr Bhoopathi
- Mukta (TV series)
- Muthina Tene
- Paramapada
- Silli Lalli

As an actor

- Krishna Nee Begane Baaro

As a director

- Hasya Taranga
- Mussanje
- Nighuda
- Tirukana Kanasu

== Literary works ==
- Vyūha (A detective drama)

== Awards and honours ==
- Kempegowda Award
