= Mayamruga =

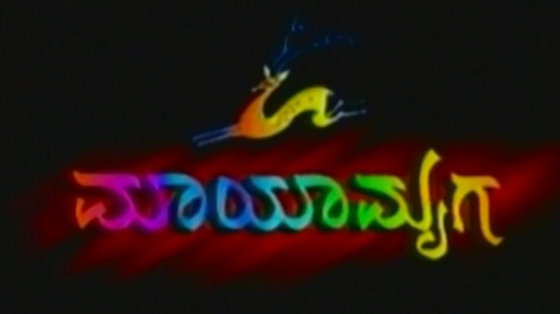
- Written by: T.N. Seetharam
- Directed by: T.N. Seetharam, P. Sheshadri, Nagendra Sha
- Music by: C.Ashwath
- Country of origin: India
- Original language: Kannada

Production
- Producer: Bhoomika Productions
- Cinematography: Rajender Singh
- Running time: 24 minutes

Original release
- Network: DD Chandana, Zee Kannada, YouTube
- Release: 1998 on DD Chandana; March 10, 2014 on Zee Kannada (re-aired); June 4, 2021 on YouTube (re-aired as online content)

Mayamruga (Kannada: ಮಾಯಾಮೃಗ; lit: 'The Illusionary animal') is a Kannada language teleserial directed by T. N. Seetharam jointly with P. Sheshadri and Nagendra Sha. It was first aired on DD Chandana in 1998, then it got re-aired on Zee Kannada on 10 March 2014. From June 4, 2021, it began to be uploaded on YouTube as online content until 3 June 2022 with 363 episodes.

== Plot ==
Mayamruga revolves around five middle-class women, Malavika, Shree Lakshmi, Brunda, Dakshayini and Vidhya, who strive to maintain a balance between their personal and principled living. Mayamruga in this serial is contexed as a dream that cannot be realized.

Malavika is a middle class born woman rights activist who dreams of an ideal society with equality and liberated women. When she finds an ideal man in Krishna Prasada who is her professor, she marries him by opposing her family consisting of Father Narayana Murthy, elder brothers Shreedhara and Ranganatha, younger sister Vidhya. When she questions the illegalities in the business matters of her father-in-law Mohana Murthy and his business partner Shivaji Rao; her father-in-law along with his wife Radha, tries to separate her from his son. Moreover, with Malavika's hostility towards her in-laws, her husband Krishna Prasada is attracted to his childhood friend Sharmila, also an only daughter of rich financier financing Mohana Murthy's business. How she deals with these situations, yet supporting her family, is her story.

Shreelakshmi along with her siblings Shyama and Sharade lives with her parents Lakshmi Narashima Shastri and Kamalamma. When Shreelakshmi gets a modelling offer from Dev Kumar's company, her orthodox father Shastry will not let her to do that. One day, one of Shastri's disciples Raghunanda comes to Shastri with a proposal of marrying Shreelakshmi and becomes a sanyasi on the engagement day. Because of the determined nature of Shastri, all of his children leave home in search of their destinies: Shyama goes to join military, Sharade joins dance ashrama and Shreelakshmi becomes actress. In the end Shastry will also depart his home along with his wife Kamalamma when he encounters a quarrel with his brother. After that Shreelakshmi come back home in search for her parents. Raghunanda refrains from becoming a sanyasi and wants to marry Shreelakshmi again, he helps Shreelakshmi in the search for her parents. During the same time Shyama comes back from the military and goes to look for his family in the old house. He finds Shreelakshmi and both of them send a telegram to the dance ashrama to call for Sharada. Shastri and his wife come across a girl named Tunga, she was crying due to the ring she had lost. She is too scared to face her grandmother. Tunga had lost both her parents during the time of her birth. Shastri and his wife go with the girl to confront her grandmother. They come across the village and are very happy that all of them know how to speak Sanskrit. After the people there form speculations that money from them had been stolen by them, Shastri does not feel good to stay there. They are getting ready for departure, when the grandmother gives the responsibility of Tunga to Shastri. The 3 siblings find their parents. They have a tearful reunion with their mother.

Brunda is a middle-class girl who intends to find a job to support her aging father Soorappa, whose street watch repair business is not doing well and whose earnings are insufficient to support the large joint family in which she lives, comprising her mother, jobless elder brother Hari, younger brother, younger sister Harini and distant relative Mukunda. Brunda's father also wants to get her married and most of her arranged marriage proposals are cancelled either because she is jobless or because of her sister Harini, who goes missing from her house, who is revealed to be kidnapped, captivated and raped by her own professor. Meanwhile, Hari marries a woman from a wealthy family, whose father promises him to reinstate in his old job. Hari's wife cannot cope with the poverty in Brunda's home, this creates unhealthy atmosphere in the home.

Brunda secretly marries a man named Suresha against his family's wishes. Acceptance of her by Suresha's mother is a big challenge, Moreover, Suresha resigns his bank job due to allegations of money laundering. This makes him to acquire a garment business by false encouragement of his friend Rajendra, which gets him into lots of financial burden due to lack of experience. The story revolves around how Brunda deals with the situations around her.

Dakshayani is a close friend of Malavika and is pregnant, unfortunately her husband has died and she is under the care of her brother-in-law Sadananda and his wife Sarala. Sadananda is in greed to inherit all the family property to his son Sachidananda rather sharing with Dakshayani and her child. Sadananda & Salara try to malign Dakshayani of having extra-marital affair and try to kill her in order to execute the inheritance. Sadananda also happens to be Government Special projects chief engineer who has authority to control Malavika's father-in-laws business. How Dakshayani with support of Malavika even though Sadananda's pressure on her husband and inlaws and with support of Shreedhara who is also in love with her deals with such circumstances is her part of the story.

Vidhya is a polio handicapped girl who is younger sister of Malavika, she lives with her father Narayana Murthy and elder brother Shreedhara. Narayanamurthy had been irresponsible husband and father, who is struggling in life because he was suspended from his job earlier due to his bad conduct. Shreedhara on the other hand is angry young man who tries to be journalist but have his own ups and downs due to his hot headed character and lack of education and improper upbringing by his father. Vidhya struggles in life to find a job due to her disabilities. Meanwhile, she gets honey trapped by a jail return goon forgery Rajeeva, he makes Malavika persuade her family to consent their only house to his name in lieu of marrying handicapped Vidhya. Through her singing skills she gets breakthrough in singing industry and secures secure income for the family. However it is revealed her husband who was already married previously with one kid and his first wife comes in search of him and encounters Vidhya. Also her husband starts legal battle to claim Vidhya's house and when this attempt fails he plans to destroy her singing career. Story revolves around how Vidhya balances her family, career and husband's illegal forgery dealings & first marriage/kid.

== Cast ==
- Malavika Avinash as Malavika
- Rekha as Shreelakshmi (Malavika's cousin)
- Manju Bhashini as Brunda/Bindu (Shreelakshmi's friend)
- Rajaram (Drama artist) as Brunda's School Principal
- Veena Sundar as Dakshayani (Malavika's friend)
- M.D. Pallavi as Vidhya (Malavika's younger sister)
- H. G. Dattatreya as Lakshmi Narasimha Shasthri (Shreelakshmi's father)
- Lakshmi Chandrashekar as Kamalamma (Shreelakshmi's mother)
- Avinash as Krishna Prasada (Malavika's Husband)
- Mukhyamantri Chandru as Mohana Murthy (Krishna Prasad's Father)
- Vaishali Kasaravalli as Radha (Mohana Murthy's wife)
- S. N. Sethuram as Narayana Murthy (Malavika's Father)
- Sundar Raj as Shivaji Rao (Mohana Murthy's business partner)
- Sihi Kahi Chandru as Ispeet Raju (Land shark)
- Sanketh Kashi as Hari (Brunda's elder brother)
- Arun Sagar as Dev Kumar (Ad agency owner)
- T.N.Seetharam as Shankara Prasada (Lawyer and Malavika's mentor)
- Krishne Gowda as Minister Desai (Mohana Murthy's Friend)
- Kishori Ballal as Girijamma (Director Suryaprakasha's mother)
- Padma Vasanthi as Sharada/Chawakasi Sharada (Shankara Prasada's wife)
- G. V. Atri as Parthasarathy (music director)
- Sharath Lohithaswa as Sanyasi Gosai
- Shringar Nagaraj as Sharma (Businessman/Film Producer, disciple of Shasthri)
- Shanthamma as Ajji (old elderly aunt of Kamalamma)
- Srinath Vasishta as Shreekanťha (Shakuntala's Bombay Neighbour & Garment factory owner)
- P. Sheshadri as Niranjana (Shakuntala's ex live in partner and Deputy commissioner of Police)
- Shashikumar C.R as Shanthakumara (Police Inspector of Tulsitotha)
- M.P Venkat Rao as Suryanarayana Rao/Suryanarayanappa/watch repair Soorappa (Brunda's father)
- Rajesh Nataranga as Shreedhara (Malavika's Elder Brother)
- Bharath Bhagavatar as Sadananda (Dakshayani's elder Brother-in-law)
- Sreemathi as Sarala (Sadananda's wife)
- Jayashree Raj as Sharade (Shreelakshmi's youngest sister)
- Vikram Suri as Shyama Shastri / Panchae Shyama (Shreelakshmi's younger brother, Thunga's & Nirmala's love interest and later's husband )
- Ashok Hegde as Rajananda/Forgery Rajeeva (Vidhya's Husband)
- Sridhar Nivarty as Suresha Rao (Brunda's husband)
- Anantha Velu as Suryaprakasha (Film Director)
- Hemanth Hegde as Raghunandana (Shreelakshmi's marriage interest & later husband)
- Nandita as Sharmila (Krishna Prasada's childhood friend and love interest)
- Swetha Shashank as Harini (Brunda's younger sister)
- Kote Prabhakar as Banavaradaraju (Liquor mafia)
- Manjula Rao as Saroja (Brunda's mother)
- Shankar Rao as Santhanam (Marriage broker and Shastri's friend)
- Shankarnarayan Rao as Dr. Shankar (Medical doctor treating Kamalamma and Dakshayani)
- Yamuna Murthy as Padma/Pammi (Brunda's Mother-in-law)
- Ramakrishna as Gunda Bhatta (Shashtri's friend)
- Poornachandra Tejaswi as Purushottama/Purshi (Shyama's best friend)
- Vijaya Sarathi as Mangalam (Devi movie producer)
- Shivajirao Jadhav as Rajendra (Suresha's friend)
- Pavan as Mukanda (Brunda's relative)
- Singer Srinath as Prasada (Harini's Marriage interest with hearing disability)
- Suresh M.N as Shankara/Shankru (Kamalamma's younger brother)
- Radha Ramachandra as Pushpamma (Sadananda's Mother)
- Srinivasa Murthy as lawyer Srinivasa (lawyer fighting for Sadananda)
- Deepashree Harish as Nirmala (Shyama's love interest and later wife)
- Mico Manju (Manjunath) as Sudhakara (Sharada's love interest and later husband)
- Krishna Pandit as Shreekant (Lawyer who fights for Rajeeva against Vidhya)
- Kalpana Naganna as Chanchal (Shreelakshmi's Mentor)
- Sugandhi Gadadhar as Thunga/Thunge (Shasthri's adopted daughter)
- Anil Kamath as Ramananda (Vidhya's love interest, singer colleague and later husband)
- Krishnamurthy(Kitti) as Prof. Subhramanya / Subbu (Shashtri's younger brother)
- Narayanaswamy as Hanumantu (Police Constable of Tulsitotha)
- Gurumurthy as Gundanna (Bank union secretary)
- Nagendra Sha as Nagarajappa (Public Prosecutor fights against Suresha and then Private lawyer fighting for Niranjana)
- J M Prahlad as Judge (Niranjana vs Shakuntala case)
- Nagnath Joshi as various characters

== Gallery ==
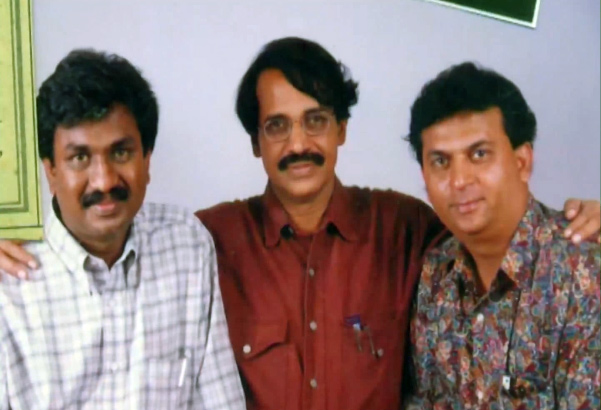
(Left to right) Director P. Sheshadri, T. N. Seetharam, Nagendra Sha

P. Sheshadri discussing his experience on making the teleserial

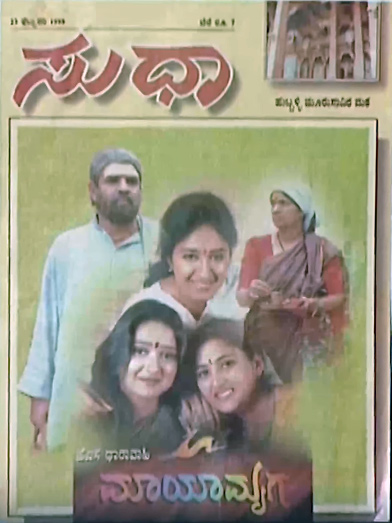
Mayamruga, appearing on 1998 February issue of Sudha magazine's cover

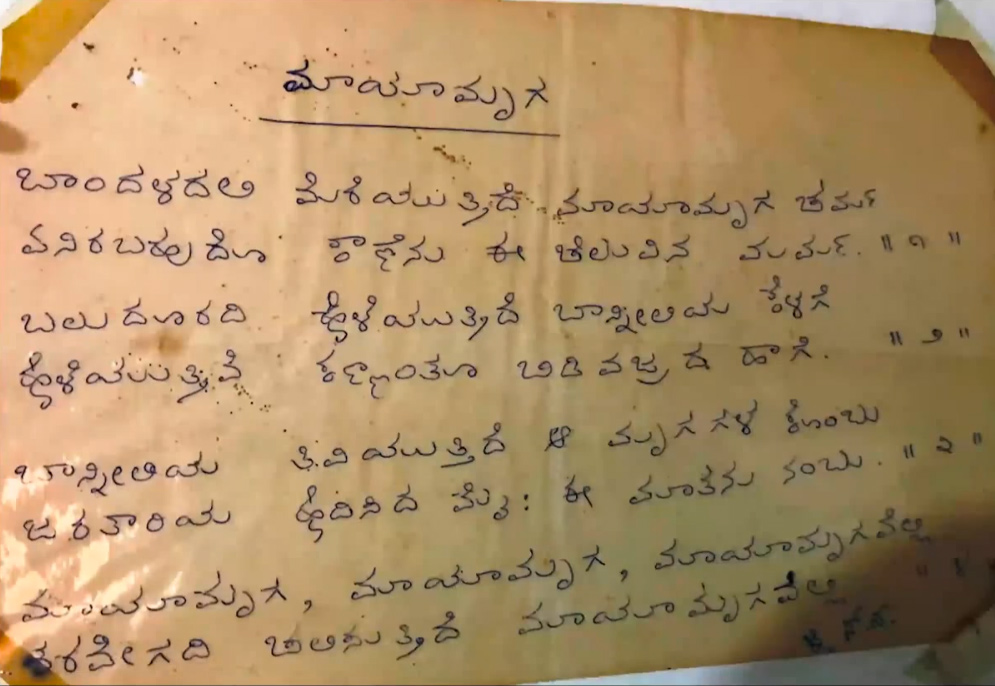
Lyrics of the title-song, hand-written by K. S. Narasimhaswamy
