= Concerned for Working Children =

Indian non-profit organisation

The Concerned for Working Children (CWC) is a non-profit organisation based in Bangalore, India, and known internationally for its work in empowering children to become the key protagonists in solving their own problems. While eradication of child labour remains the key focus of CWC, the organisation opposes simple criminalisation and addresses related issues such as children's rights, gender equality, community development, education and advocacy. Founded in 1985, it has organised Bhima Sangha, a union of and for working children that now has 20,000 members, and launched the National Movement of Working Children. Internationally, it co-founded the International Working Group on Child Labour (IWGCL), and CWC child delegates have contributed to ILO (International Labour Organization) conferences on child labour.

CWC believes that given political and social space, marginalised children could become protagonists of their own change. With the support of the Concerned for Working Children, active participation of children in understanding problems that affect them and in devising appropriate solutions, has led to the creation of 'Makkala Panchayats' (Children's Village Governing Bodies) in many parts of Karnataka.

CWC is playing a part in international research into children's mobility issues, with agreement on greater involvement of children in all aspects of this research project.

CWC receives funding support from a Norwegian charity and CWC has been first NGO from Bengaluru to be nominated for the Nobel Peace Prize and holds a legacy for being nominated for the same for three years consecutively for the years 2012, 2013 and 2014, for its pioneering works in the field of children's participation globally. The nomination for the award was filed by three Norwegian parliamentarians on learning about the contributions of the NGO through a blogger from their country who shared his experience on a visit to India and serving at CWC and the parliamentarians mentioned the same in their nomination letter as,“The organisation and its network have been pioneers in children’s participation within research, public planning, youth democracy, media and other areas. Few other local organisations elsewhere have contributed as much to this work”.

== History ==
The Concerned for Working Children started working on the issue of Child Labour and Child Participation in the 1980s. The organisation registered itself as a non-profit in 1985 and headquartered at L.B. Shastri Nagar, Vimanapura, Bengaluru. CWC's early work involved the unionisation of the informal sector where children below the age of 14 years comprised nearly 40% of the work force. The children and the members of the union embarked on an exercise to draft an alternative legislation for working children in 1985. The organisation since its inception had been working towards emancipation of children from weaker sections and make them respected citizens and help children in establishing and maintaining a secular, equitable, just and non-discriminatory world on par with their adult counterparts. The organisation had planned to expand their outreach based on four ‘thematic pillars’ of child labour, child rights, migrant workers and civil society participation.

Until 2018, the organisation had reached out to more than one lakh beneficiaries directly through field works concentrated in different rural and urban areas within Karnatka and to expand its global reach the NGO had been proactive in capacity building, research and advocacy and collaborating with state administrations in working and achieving towards their ultimate goal of bringing children as participative citizens.

The Organisation comprises 45 members, including journalists, anthropologists, sociologists, lawyers and social workers. It is stated that areas of work include children's citizenship rights, civic education, and governance advocacy for marginalised communities.

== Films ==
- Kavita Ratna, Citizens Today, a film on children's right to participation from CWC, 2002.
- Kavita Ratna, Taking Destiny into Their Hands, a film about how marginalised children are impacting their own destinies.
