= U. R. Ananthamurthy =

Indian Kannada-language writer and critic (1932-2014)

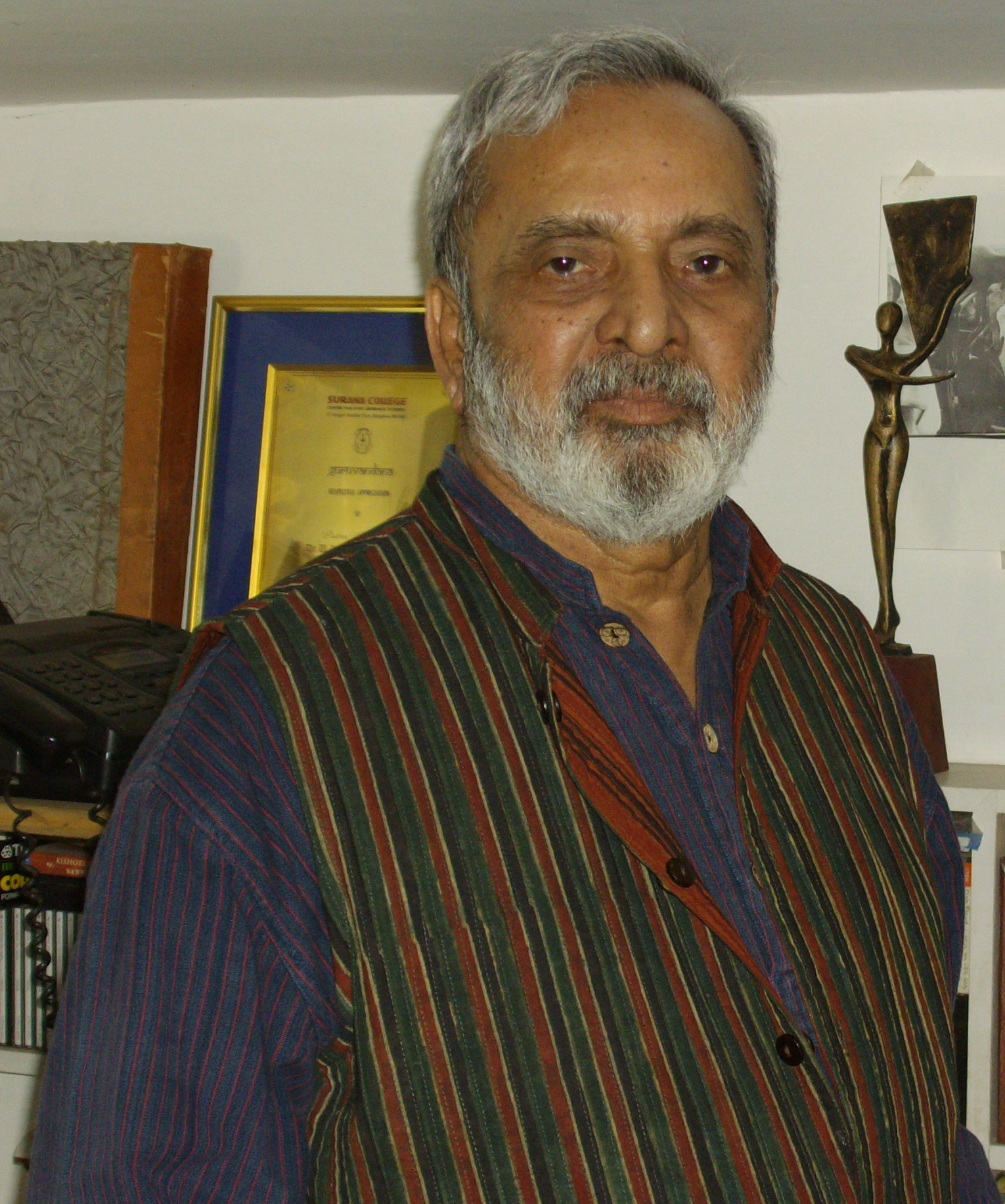
- Born: Udupi Rajagopalacharya Ananthamurthy; 21 December 1932; Melige, Thirthahalli, Shivamogga, Karnataka, India
- Died: 22 August 2014 (aged 81); Bangalore, Karnataka, India
- Education: Mysore University, University of Birmingham
- Occupations: English Professor, Vice Chancellor, President Sahitya Akademi and National Book Trust
- Writing career
- Period: 1950-2014
- Genres: Story, Novel, Poetry and Criticism
- Subject: Various Themes
- Movement: Navya

Udupi Rajagopalacharya Ananthamurthy (21 December 1932 – 22 August 2014) was an Indian contemporary writer and critic in the Kannada language. He was born in Thirthahalli Taluk and is considered one of the pioneers of the Navya movement.

In 1994, he became the sixth Kannada writer to be honored with the Jnanpith Award, the highest literary honour conferred in India. In 1998, he received the Padma Bhushan award from the Government of India. He was the vice-chancellor of Mahatma Gandhi University in Kerala during the late 1980s. He was one of the finalists of Man Booker International Prize for the year 2013. He remained a fervent critic of nationalistic political parties until his death from kidney failure and cardiac arrest on 22 August 2014.

== Early life ==
Ananthamurthy was born into Kannada-speaking Brahmin family in Melige, in Thirthahalli Taluk in the Shimoga district. His education started in a traditional Sanskrit school in Doorvasapura and continued in Thirthahalli and Mysore.

After receiving a Master of Arts degree from the University of Mysore, Ananthamurthy taught in the English department at University of Mysore (pictured) for a while before embarking to England for further studies on a Commonwealth Scholarship. He earned his doctorate from the University of Birmingham in 1966 for his dissertation thesis entitled "Politics and Fiction in the 1930s".

== Career ==
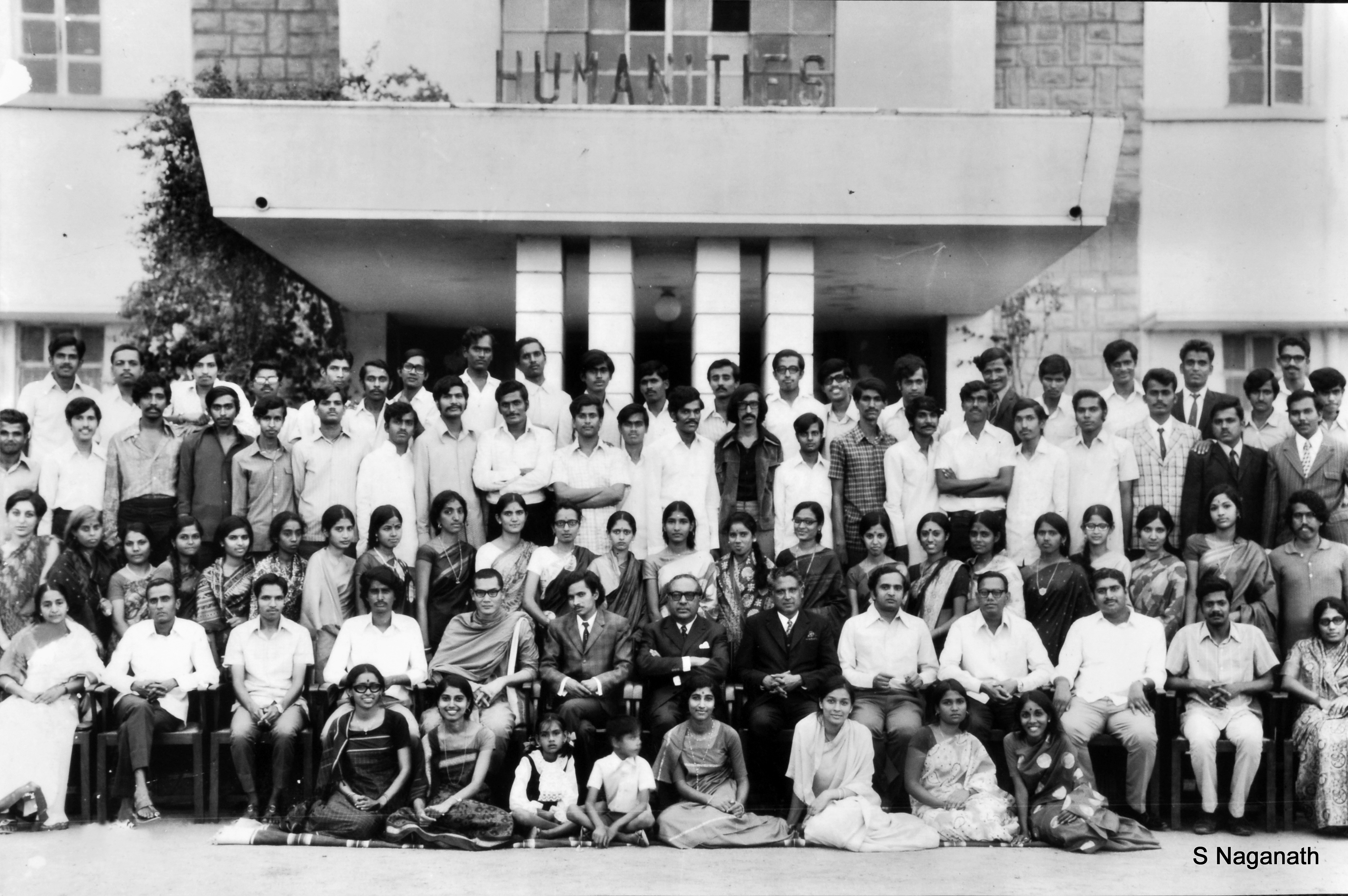
U. R. Ananthamurthy at Manasa Gangotri, University of Mysore in the early 1970s before embarking to England. (seated on 9th chair from left)

Ananthamurthy started his career as a professor and instructor in 1970 in the English department of University of Mysore. He was the Vice-Chancellor of Mahatma Gandhi University in Kottayam, Kerala from 1987 to 1991. He served as the Chairman of National Book Trust India for the year 1992. In 1993, he was elected as the president of Sahitya Academy. He served as a visiting professor in many Indian and foreign universities including Jawaharlal Nehru University, University of Tübingen, University of Iowa, Tufts University, and Shivaji University.

Ananthamurthy served twice as the Chairman of the Film and Television Institute of India. In 2012, he was appointed as the first Chancellor of the Central University of Karnataka. He was also a reason for the establishment of the Humanities department of Manipal University. Later in 2012, he served as a visiting faculty at Manipal Centre for Philosophy and Humanities, Manipal University for four months.

Ananthamurthy has participated and delivered lectures in numerous seminars as a writer and orator, both in and outside the country. He was a member of the committee of Indian writers and visited countries like the Soviet Union, Hungary, France, and West Germany in 1990. He visited Moscow in 1989 as a board member for a Soviet newspaper. Ananthamurthy was the leader for the committee of writers who visited China in 1993.

== Literary works ==
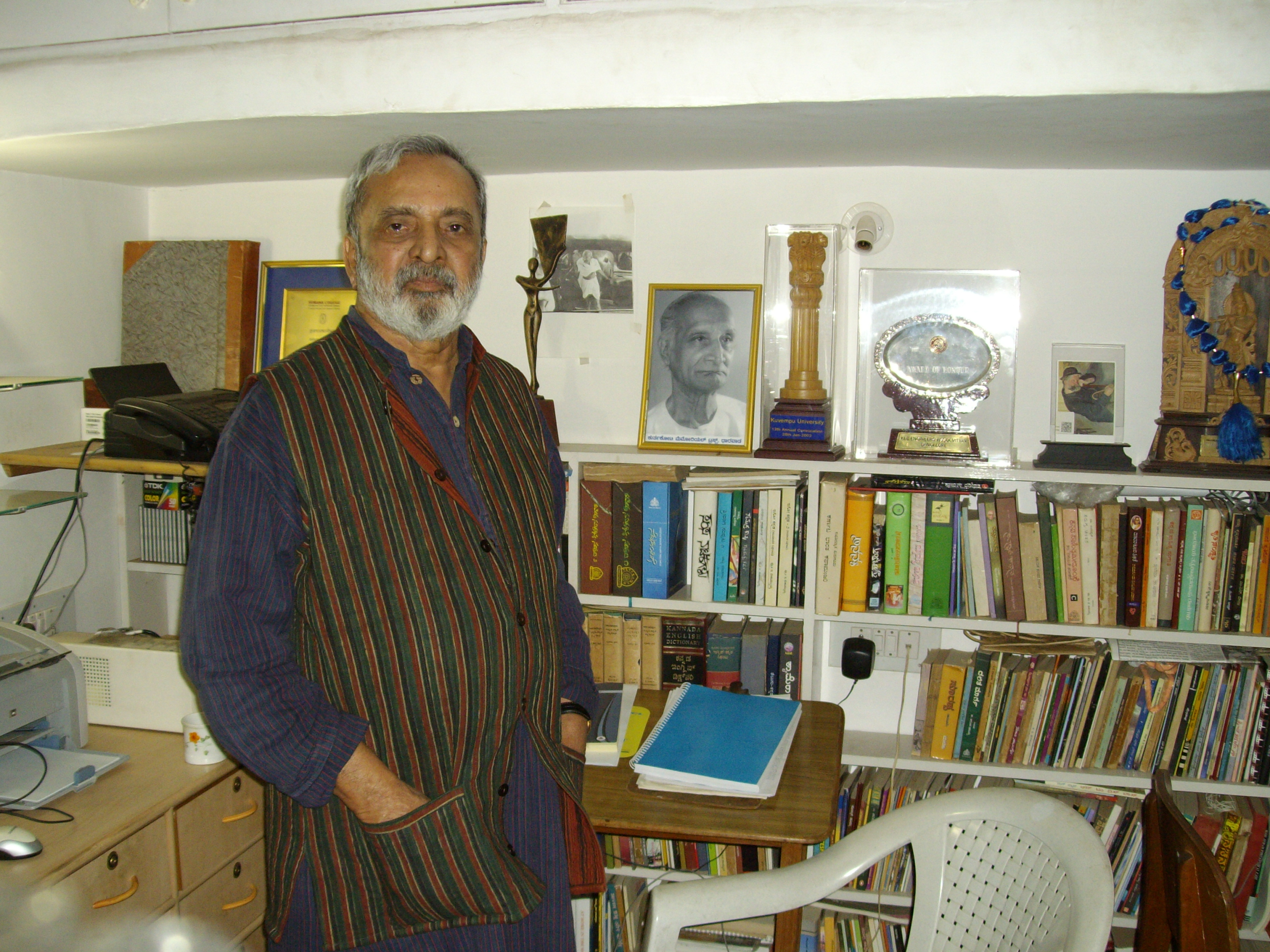
U R Ananthamurthy in his reading room

U.R Ananthamurthy Interview on the occasion of Kannada Wikipedia's 9th Anniversary

Ananthamurthy's works have been translated into several Indian and European languages and have been awarded with important literary prizes. His main works include Prashne, Aakasha Mattu Bekku, Samskara, Bhava, Bharathipura, and Avasthe. He has written numerous short stories as well. Several of his novels and short fictions have been made into movies, including Samskara, Bara, Avaste, Mouni, Sookha, Ghatashraddha, and Diksha.

Most of Ananthamurthy's literary works deal with psychological aspects of people in different situations, times, and circumstances. His writings supposedly analyse aspects ranging from challenges and changes faced by Brahmin families of Karnataka, to bureaucrats dealing with politics influencing their work.

Most of his novels focus on the reaction of individuals to situations that are unusual and artificial. Results of influences of sociopolitical and economic changes on traditional Hindu societies of India, and clashes due to such influences — between a father and a son, husband and wife, father and daughter — and finally the love that flows beneath all such clashes, are portrayed by Ananthamurthy in his works. This is evident in his stories like Sooryana Kudure (The Sun's Horse), Mouni (Silent Man), Karthika, "Ghatashraddha", etc. However, Ananthamurthy does not just cling to portraying such somewhat standard subjects of Indian literature of his period. His novelette Bara (Drought) portrays the dynamics of a drought-stricken district of Karnataka and the challenges and dilemmas a bureaucrat may face in such situations.

The central figure of the novel Sooryana Kudure, Venkata, is shunned by his son and wife for his easy-going attitude that does not take him anywhere. Venkata is a non-achiever who could not achieve any material or monetary success in his life; however, he is a simpleton who does not take life's suffering too much to heart. He likes to see life as living in the love of Amma (or mother-goddess). In all sufferings of life, he has child-like curiosity about the smallest things in life, like a grasshopper (Sooryana Kudure). The evening after his son revolts and leaves the house, he would be engrossed in a sight in his yard of a grasshopper shining in the sun's light.

== Personal life ==
U. R. Ananthamurthy met his wife Esther in 1954 and they were married in 1956. They had two children, Sharath and Anuradha. He resided in Bangalore for most of his later life. His son-in-law Vivek Shanbhag is also a famous writer in Kannada.

== Political career ==
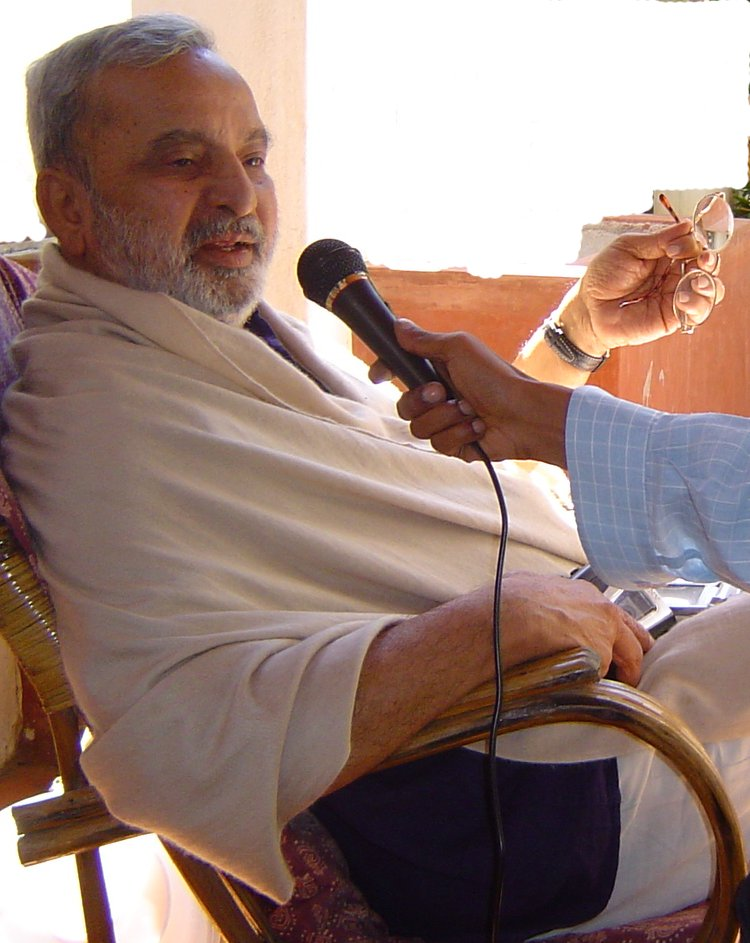
U R Ananthamurthy in an interview

U. R. Ananthamurthy made an unsuccessful run for the Lok Sabha in 2004, in which he stated that his prime ideological objective in opting to contest the elections was to fight the Bharatiya Janata Party (BJP).

A Janata Dal (Secular) leader and former Prime Minister of India, H. D. Deve Gowda, had made an offer for Murthy to contest for his party. However, after the Janata Dal worked out a power sharing agreement with the BJP, Murthy said:

I will never forgive my friends in the Janata Dal (Secular) for joining hands with the BJP.

Ananthamurthy also contested for the Rajya Sabha elections from state assembly in 2006.

The idea proposed by Ananthamurthy to rename ten cities in Karnataka, including Bengaluru, from their colonial forms to actual native forms was accepted by the Government of Karnataka, and the cities were renamed on the occasion of the golden jubilee celebrations of the formation of Karnataka.

== Controversies ==
In June 2007, Ananthamurthy declared that he would not take part in literary functions in future in the wake of strong criticism for his reaction on S. L. Bhyrappa's controversial novel Aavarana that appeared in a section of the media.

In 2013, Ananthamurthy's statement that there is a reference in the Mahabharata to Brahmin's consuming beef drew criticism from Hindu religious leaders. Vishwesha Tirtha Swami of Pejawar Math commented that there was no reference to Brahmins consuming beef in the conversation between Bhishma and Yudhishtira or anywhere else in the Mahabharata, and Ananthamurthy's statement came as a surprise to him.

A vocal critic of the Rashtriya Swayamsevak Sangh and Bharatiya Janata Party (BJP)/Jan Sangh for over 50 years, Ananthamurthy said in 2013 that he would not live in the country ruled by BJP leader Narendra Modi. He later clarified that those remarks were made when he was "overcome by emotion" and said that he had no such plan, though he continued to oppose BJP. Murthy was given special police protection after he began receiving threatening phone calls. Later when Modi became the Prime Minister, he was given a free ticket to Pakistan by a group of Modi supporters called "NaMo Brigade". After Ananthamurthy's death was announced on 22 August 2014, several BJP and Hindu Jagarana Vedike were booked for celebrating his death by bursting crackers at four places in Mangalore and one spot in Chikkamagaluru.

== Death ==
Bust of U. R. Ananthamurthy at Dr. Rajkumar Children Park (Jinke Park), Bengaluru (2026)

Ananthamurthy died of cardiac arrest on 22 August 2014 at Manipal Hospital, in Bangalore, India, aged 81. He had been suffering from kidney-related disease for some years and was undergoing dialysis treatment with diabetes and heart problems. He was admitted to Manipal Hospital on 13 August with an infection and fever, and underwent treatment on a multi-support system.

The Prime Minister of India, Narendra Modi, paid his condolences in response to Ananathamurthy's death..

== Awards ==
- 1972–74: Homi Bhabha Fellowship
- 1984: Rajyothsava Award
- 1994: Jnanpith Award
- 1998: Padma Bhushan
- 2004: Sahitya Akademi Fellowship
- 2008: Nadoja Award by Kannada University
- 2011: Shortlisted for The Hindu Literary Prize (Bharathipura)
- 2012: D. Litt. Honoris Causa of the University of Calcutta
- 2012: Basheer Puraskaram
- 2013: Nominated, Man Booker International Prize

=== Karnataka State Film Awards ===
- 1970–71: Best Story Writer – Samskara (1970)
- 1977–78: Best Story Writer – Ghatashraddha (1977)
- 1987–88: Best Dialogue Writer – Avasthe (1987) (Shared with Krishna Masadi)
- 2002–03: Best Story Writer – Mouni (2003)

== Bibliography ==
Below is a selected list of his books.

=== Collection of stories ===
- Endendoo Mugiyada Kathe/ಎಂದೆಂದೂ ಮುಗಿಯದ ಕಥೆ
- Prashne/ಪ್ರಶ್ನೆ
- Mouni/ಮೌನಿ
- Aakaasha Mattu Bekku/ಆಕಾಶ ಮತ್ತು ಬೆಕ್ಕು
- Sooryana Kudure/ಸೂರ್ಯನ ಕುದುರೆ
- Pachhe Resort/ಪಚ್ಚೆ ರೆಸಾರ್ಟ್
- Eppattara Dashakada Kathe/ಎಪ್ಪತ್ತರ ದಶಕದ ಕಥೆ
- Eradu Dashakada Kategalu/ಎರಡು ದಶಕದ ಕಥೆಗಳು
- Aidu Dashakada Kategalu/ಐದು ದಶಕದ ಕಥೆಗಳು
- Aayda Kathegalu/ಆಯ್ದ ಕಥೆಗಳು
- Samasta Kathegalu/ಸಮಸ್ತ ಕಥೆಗಳು

=== Novels ===
- Samskara/ಸಂಸ್ಕಾರ
- Bhharathipura/ಭಾರತೀಪುರ
- Avasthe/ಅವಸ್ಥೆ
- Bhava/ಭವ
- Divya/ದಿವ್ಯ
- Preeti Mrithyu Bhaya/ಪ್ರೀತಿ ಮೃತ್ಯು ಭಯ

=== Plays ===
- Aavaahane/ಆವಾಹನೆ

=== Collection of poems ===
- 15 Padyagalu/15 ಪದ್ಯಗಳು
- Mithuna/ಮಿಥುನ
- Ajjana Hegala Sukkugalu/ಅಜ್ಜನ ಹೆಗಲ ಸುಕ್ಕುಗಳು
- Illiyavaregina Kavithegalu/ಇಲ್ಲಿಯವರೆಗಿನ ಕವಿತೆಗಳು
- Abhava/ಅಭಾವ
- Samasta Kavya/ಸಮಸ್ತ ಕಾವ್ಯ

=== Literary criticism and essays ===
- Prajne Mattu Parisara/ಪ್ರಜ್ಞೆ ಮತ್ತು ಪರಿಸರ
- Sannivesha/ಸನ್ನಿವೇಶ
- Samakshama/ಸಮಕ್ಷಮ
- Poorvapara/ಪೂರ್ವಾಪರ
- Yugapallata/ಯುಗಪಲ್ಲಟ
- Navyaloka/ನವ್ಯಾಲೋಕ
- Bettale Pooje Yaake Koodadu?/ಬೆತ್ತಲೆ ಪೂಜೆ ಯಾಕೆ ಕೂಡದು?
- Valmikiya Nevadalli/ವಾಲ್ಮೀಕಿಯ ನೆವದಲ್ಲಿ
- Maatu Sotha Bharatha/ಮಾತು ಸೋತ ಭಾರತ
- Sadya Mattu Shashvata/ಸದ್ಯ ಮತ್ತು ಶಾಶ್ವತ
- Rujuvathu/ಋಜುವಾತು
- Ruchikara Kahisathyagala Kaala/ರುಚಿಕರ ಕಹಿಸತ್ಯಗಳ ಕಾಲ
- Kalamaana/ಕಾಲಮಾನ
- Aacheeche/ಆಚೀಚೆ
- Nanna Sahithyada Aidu Dashakagalu/ನನ್ನ ಸಾಹಿತ್ಯದ ಐದು ದಶಕಗಳು
- Bhishmaprajne/ಭೀಷ್ಮ ಪ್ರಜ್ಞೆ
- Hindutva athava Hind Swaraj/ಹಿಂದುತ್ವ ಅಥವಾ ಹಿಂದ್ ಸ್ವರಾಜ್
- Andininda Indinavarege/ಅಂದಿನಿಂದ ಇಂದಿನವರೆಗೆ
- Aayda Barahagalu/ಆಯ್ದ ಬರಹಗಳು

=== Autobiography ===
- Suragi/ಸುರಗಿ

=== Journalism ===
- Editor – Rujuvaathu/ಋಜುವಾತು

=== Editor ===
- Kannada Kavya Sangraha/ಕನ್ನಡ ಕಾವ್ಯ ಸಂಗ್ರಹ - 1973

=== Movies ===
- Samskara – 1970
- Ghatashraddha – 1978
- Bara – 1982
- Sookha – 1983 (Hindi Film)
- Avasthe – 1987
- Diksha – 1992 (Hindi Film)
- Mouni – 2003
- Prakruthi – 2013

=== Teleserial ===
- Bharathipura/ಭಾರತೀಪುರ (DD Chandana) Directed by Krishna Masadi

== See also ==
- Karnataka State Film Awards
