= Mikka Bannada Hakki =

2024 Indian Kannada-language drama film

- Directed by: Manohara K
- Written by: Manohara K; Sonia S
- Based on: Mikka Bannada Hakki by Sonia S
- Produced by: Prithvi Konanur; Thejaswi Konanur; Manjesh M R
- Starring: Jayashri; Mahadev Hadapad; Gayathri Heggodu; Rekha Kudligi
- Cinematography: Sanjay Channappa
- Edited by: Shivakumara Swamy
- Production company: Konanur Productions
- Release date: 19 June 2024 (Shanghai)
- Running time: 90 minutes
- Country: India
- Language: Kannada

Mikka Bannada Hakki (transl. Bird of a Different Feather) is a 2024 Indian Kannada-language coming-of-age drama film written and directed by debutant Manohara K and co-produced by Prithvi Konanur. The screenplay is adapted directly from the 2017 real-life autobiography of the same name by Sonia S, chronicling the intense psychological and social hurdles encountered by a 12-year-old girl living with albinism in a conservative rural village in Karnataka.

The film made its world premiere at the Shanghai International Film Festival in June 2024, competing in the Asian New Talent section where it secured five major nominations. The film was screened across various film festivals globally.

== Plot ==
Sonia is a 12-year-old schoolgirl with albinism who resides with her family in a rural village near Bengaluru. Due to her striking physical differences such as white hair, pale skin, and low vision, she is treated as an outcast within her immediate ecosystem. Her father, Kitty, is a chronic alcoholic who makes a meager livelihood selling peanuts at local transport blocks. Shamed by the community's harsh superstitions regarding his daughter, Kitty harbors a bitter, volatile resentment toward Sonia, often unleashing verbal abuse upon her. Conversely, her mother, Devamma, attempts to provide a sheltering maternal presence while tending to household chores and caring for Sonia's younger brother, Rama, but remains entirely powerless against the crushing weight of systemic poverty and her husband's destructive habits.

Sonia transitions into the 8th standard at a high school located in a nearby semi-urban center, hoping for a fresh start. However, she is immediately met with open hostility. On her first day, her strict class teacher, Ashwini, severely reprimands her in front of the classroom because she does not wear the prescribed school shoes, uniform ribbon, and belt, which are items her parents are too broke to afford. Ashwini operates a highly discriminatory classroom dynamic, prioritizing high-scoring students in the front row while pushing struggling, under-resourced children to the back of the classroom.

Isolated and alienated, Sonia becomes a target for cruel mockery and bullying from her new classmates. Her academic performance experiences a steep downfall; her school notebooks remain empty because she cannot keep up with the fast-paced whiteboard lectures. Driven to deep emotional isolation and severe self-pity, a subsequent medical check-up reveals a fundamental medical issue: Sonia has been suffering from an unaddressed, severe visual impairment inherently linked to her albinism, which is the underlying cause for her inability to read the school board. Confronted with this clarity and learning to navigate her physical constraints, the narrative charts Sonia's internal coming-of-age progression, moving from absolute vulnerability to an unshakeable sense of self-dignity, maturity, and personal identity.

== Cast ==
- Jayashri as Sonia
- Mahadev Hadapad as Kitty
- Gayathri Heggodu as Devamma
- Rekha Kudligi as Ashwini

== Production ==
The project is the directorial feature debut of Manohara K, who initially entered the Indian film landscape as a child actor. Under the direction of acclaimed independent filmmaker Prithvi Konanur, Manohara won the prestigious National Film Award for Best Child Artist for his lead performance in the 2016 film Railway Children. Continuing his professional association under Konanur's guidance and mentorship, Manohara assisted on subsequent festival-selected titles like Where Is Pinki? (2020) and Seventeeners (2022) before selecting Sonia S's 2017 autobiography to adapt into his debut feature. The script was co-written by Manohara and Sonia S to ensure complete autobiographical authenticity.

== Release and reception ==
Mikka Bannada Hakki had an exclusive worldwide release across domestic and international film festival networks. Following its global launch in China, the film toured prominent alternative, youth, and independent cinema gatherings, including the Children's and Youth International Film Festival in Iran and the Kathmandu International Mountain Film Festival.

The film received widespread acclaim from film critics and festival crowds. Reviewers from independent cinematic portals such as Upperstall praised the film's subtle and restrained aesthetic, highlighting its absolute refusal to employ standard, tear-jerking commercial clichés or melodramatic tropes to exploit the protagonist's disability.

== Accolades ==
Year	Festival / Award	Category	Recipient(s)	Result
2024	Shanghai International Film Festival	Best Film (Asian New Talent Award)	Manohara K, Prithvi Konanur	Nominated
2024	Shanghai International Film Festival	Best Director (Asian New Talent Award)	Manohara K	Nominated
2024	Shanghai International Film Festival	Best Screenplay (Asian New Talent Award)	Manohara K, Sonia S	Nominated
2024	Shanghai International Film Festival	Best Cinematography (Asian New Talent Award)	Sanjay L. Channappa	Nominated
2024	Shanghai International Film Festival	Best Actress (Asian New Talent Award)	Jayashri	Won
2024	Jordan Children's Film Festival	Best Feature Film	Mikka Bannada Hakki	Won
2024	Jordan Children's Film Festival	Audience Award	Mikka Bannada Hakki	Nominated
2024	Jordan Children's Film Festival	Children's Jury Prize	Mikka Bannada Hakki	Nominated
2024	Jordan Children's Film Festival	UNICEF Award	Mikka Bannada Hakki	Nominated
2024	International Film Festival of India	Best Debut Director of Indian Feature Film	Manohara K	Nominated
2024	Alternativa Film Festival and Awards	Spotlight Award	Mikka Bannada Hakki	Won
2025	Bengaluru International Film Festival	Best Kannada Film	Mikka Bannada Hakki	Won
2025	Third Eye Asian Film Festival	Best Actress	Jayashri	Won
2025	Kathmandu International Mountain Film Festival	Best Feature Fiction	Mikka Bannada Hakki	Nominated
2025	Kathmandu International Mountain Film Festival	KU Emerging Filmmaker Award	Manohara K	Won
2025	Asian Film Festival Barcelona	NETPAC Award – Best Screenplay	Manohara K, Sonia S	Won
2025	Giffoni Film Festival	Best Film (Elements +10)	Mikka Bannada Hakki	Nominated
