= 2020 Karnataka State Film Awards =

Annual Indian film awards

55th Karnataka State Film Awards
- Awarded for: Best of Kannada Cinema in 2020
- Presented by: Siddaramaiah (Chief Minister of Karnataka)
- Announced on: 12 March 2025
- Site: Bengaluru, Karnataka, India

Highlights
- Best Direction: Prithvi Konanur; Pinki Elli
- Best Actor: Prajwal Devaraj; Gentleman
- Best Actress: Akshatha Pandavapura; Pinki Elli
- Most awards: Thaledanda (4)

The 2020 Karnataka State Film Awards, presented by Government of Karnataka, felicitated the best of Karnataka cinema released in the year 2020. The selection advisory committee was headed by film director B. S. Lingadevaru along with journalist Padma Shivamogga, actress Padma Vasanthi, cinema analyst Ivan De Silva, director Umesh Nayak, production manager D. R. Sampath, cinematographer Manjunath. R and music director Gururaj.

Actor Sanchari Vijay was posthumously honoured with Special Jury Award for his contribution to cinema.

== Lifetime achievement award ==
Award title	Awardee(s)	Awarded As	Awards
Dr. Rajkumar Award			₹2,00,000 and a gold medal with a certificate
Puttanna Kanagal Award			₹2,00,000 and a gold medal with a certificate
Dr. Vishnuvardhan Award			₹2,00,000 and a gold medal with a certificate

== Film awards ==
Award title	Film	Producer(s)	Director
First Best Film	Pinki Elli	Krishne Gowda	Prithvi Konanur
Second Best Film	Varnapatala	Kavitha Santhosh & Saraswathi Hosadurga	Chethan Mundadi
Third Best Film	Hariva Nadige Maiyella Kalu		Babu Eshwar Prasad
Best Film of Social Concern	Giliyu Panjaradollilla; Ee Mannu	Eshwaridas Shetty, Rajeshwari Rai	Ramadas Naidu; Shivadwaj Shetty
Best Children Film	Padaka	Aditya R. Chiranjeevi	Aditya R. Chiranjeevi
Best Regional Film	Jeetige (Tulu language)	Arun Rai Thodar	Santhosh Mada
Best Entertaining Film	Fourwalls	T. Vishwanath Naik	S. S. Sajjan
Best Debut Film of Newcomer Director	Neeli Hakki	Ganesh Hegde, Suman Shetty, Vinay Shetty, Yogesh	Ganesh Hegde

== Other awards ==
Award title	Film	Awardee	Cash prize
Best Director	Pinki Elli	Prithvi Konanur	₹ 1,00,000
Best Actor	Gentleman	Prajwal Devaraj	₹ 20,000
Best Actress	Pinki Elli	Akshatha Pandavapura	₹ 20,000
Best Supporting Actor	Thaledanda	Ramesh Pandit	₹ 20,000
Best Supporting Actress	Danthapurana	Manjulamma	₹ 20,000
Best Child Actor	Danthapurana	Ahil Ansari	₹ 20,000
Best Child Actress	Paaru	Hitaishi Poojar	₹ 20,000
Best Music Direction	Malgudi Days	Gagan Baderia	₹ 20,000
Best Male Playback Singer	Acharya Sri Shankara	Aniruddha Sastry	₹ 20,000
Best Female Playback Singer	Danthapurana	Arundhati Vasishta	₹ 20,000
Best Cinematography	Thaledanda	Ashok Kashyap	₹ 20,000
Best Editing	Act 1978	Nagendra K. Ujjaini	₹ 20,000
Best Lyrics	• Parjanya • Ee Mannu	• Gargi Karehaklu • Sachin Shetty Kumble	₹ 20,000
Best Art Direction	Bicchugatti	Gunasekhar	₹ 20,000
Best Story Writer	Ranchi	Shashikant Gatti	₹ 20,000
Best Screenplay	Chandni Bar	Raghavendra Kumar	₹ 20,000
Best Dialogue Writer	Hoovina Hara	Veerappa Maralvadi	₹ 20,000
Jury's Special Award	Thaledanda & Act 1978	Sanchari Vijay (posthumous - acting)	₹ 20,000 each
Jury's Special Award	Saravajra	Sri Valli (costume design)	₹ 20,000 each
Jury's Special Award	Thaledanda	Ramesh Babu (production)	₹ 20,000 each
Jury's Special Award	Amruth Apartments	V G Rajan (sound recording)	₹ 20,000 each
Jury's Special Award	Arabbie	Vishwas K S (acting)	₹ 20,000 each
Jury's Special Award	Kannadiga	Champakadhama Babu (production manager)	₹ 20,000 each
Best Book on Kannada Cinema			₹ 20,000
Best Short Film			₹ 20,000
