= Karnataka State Film Award for Second Best Film =

Indian film award

- State award for contributions to Kannada cinema
- Sponsored by: Government of Karnataka
- Rewards: Silver Medal; ₹75,000
- First award: 1966-67
- Final award: 2021
- Most recent winner: 777 Charlie

Highlights
- Total awarded: 55
- First winner: Nakkare Ade Swarga

The Karnataka State Film Award for Second Best Film is one of the Karnataka State Film Awards presented annually since the awards were instituted for Kannada-language films in 1966–67. The award is given to Kannada films produced in the year.

== Winners ==
Year	Film	Producer(s)	Director(s)
1966–67	Nakkare Ade Swarga	• Srikanth Nahata • Srikanth Patel	M. R. Vittal
1967–68	Sarvamangala	Doddammanni Urs	Chaduranga
1968–69	Namma Makkalu	Harini	R. Nagendra Rao
1969–70	Uyyale	• Gopal • Lakshman	N. Lakshminarayan
1970–71	Samskara	Pattabhirama Reddy	Pattabhirama Reddy
1971–72	Bangaarada Manushya	• Gopal • Lakshman	Siddalingaiah
1972–73	Naagarahaavu	N. Veeraswamy	Puttanna Kanagal
1973–74	Maadi Madidavaru	D. Ramadas	K. M. Shankarappa
1973–74	Kaadu	• G. N. Lakshmipathi • K. N. Narayana	Girish Karnad
1974–75	Kankana	Hamzu Jagaluru Imam	M. B. S. Prasad
1975–76	Hamsageethe	G. V. Iyer	G. V. Iyer
1976–77	Rishya Shringa	V. R. K. Prasad	V. R. K. Prasad
1977–78	Spandana	Nisarga Films Academy	P. N. Srinivas
1978–79	Savithri	• Hamzu Jagaluru Imam • T. S. Ranga	T. S. Ranga
1979–80	Minchina Ota	• Anant Nag • Shankar Nag	Shankar Nag
1980–81	Mooru Darigalu	N. S. Devi Prasad	Girish Kasaravalli
1981–82	Muniyana Madari	Dorai - Bhagawan	Dorai - Bhagawan
1982–83	Phaniyamma	Prema Karanth	Prema Karanth
1983–84	Benki		Baraguru Ramachandrappa
1984–85	Bettada Hoovu	Parvathamma Rajkumar	N. Lakshminarayan
1985–86	Dhruva Thare	• S. A. Govindaraj • V. Bharathraj	M. S. Rajashekar
1986–87	Surya	Nataraj Bellary	Baraguru Ramachandrappa
1987–88	Avasthe	• Mahima Patel • Esther Ananthamurthy • Krishna Masadi • Niranjan Patel	Krishna Masadi
1988–89	Belli Belaku	Kodalli Shivaram	Kodalli Shivaram
1989–90	Santha Shishunala Sharifa	• Srihari L. Khoday • Mahima Patel	T. S. Nagabharana
1990–91	Krama	Meharunnisa	Asrar Abid
1991–92	Mysore Mallige	Srihari L. Khoday	T. S. Nagabharana
1992–93	Aathanka	• Sharada Shastry • S. V. Prasad	Om Sai Prakash
1993–94	Aakasmika	S. A. Govindaraj	T. S. Nagabharana
1994–95	Aragini	• B. N. Ravikumar • R. Prakash	P. H. Vishwanath
1995–96	Kraurya	Nirmala Chitagopi	Girish Kasaravalli
1996–97	Nagamandala	Srihari L. Khoday	T. S. Nagabharana
1997–98	Laali	Rockline Venkatesh	Dinesh Babu
1996–97	Hoomale	K. S. Usha Rao	Nagathihalli Chandrashekar
1999–2000	Kaanuru Heggadathi	• H. G. Narayan • I. P. Malle Gowda • C. M. Narayan	Girish Karnad
2000–01	Shaapa	• B. C. Patil • Vanaja Patil	Ashok Patil
2001–02	Ekangi	V. Ravichandran	V. Ravichandran
2002–03	Kshaama	Ramesh Yadav	Baraguru Ramachandrappa
2003–04	Shanti	Ramesh Yadav	Baraguru Ramachandrappa
2004–05	Beru	Mithra Chitra	P. Sheshadri
2005–06	Nenapirali	Ajay Gowda	Ratnaja
2006–07	Duniya	T. P. Siddaraju	Duniya Soori
2007–08	Moggina Jade	• P. R. Ramadas Naidu • Beerappa	P. R. Ramadas Naidu
2008–09	Jhossh	S. Sanjay Babu	Shivamani
2009–10	Manasaare	Rockline Venkatesh	Yogaraj Bhat
2010–11	Thamassu	• Syed Aman Bachchan • M. S. Ravindra	Agni Shridhar
2011	Koormavatara	• Basanth Kumar Patil • Amrutha Patil	Girish Kasaravalli
2012	Bharath Stores	Basanth Kumar Patil	P. Sheshadri
2013	Jatta	N. S. Rajkumar	B. M. Giriraj
2014	Abhimanyu	Arjun Sarja	Arjun Sarja
2015	Maarikondavaru	• Gururaj Seth • S. Venkatesh	K. Shivarudraiah
2016	Railway Children	• Birthi Gangadhar • Chetana Gokul	Prithvi Konanur
2017	March 22	• Harish Sherigar • Sharmila Sherigar	Kodlu Ramakrishna
2018	Ramana Savari	• Stroiney Pais • Swapna	K Shivarudraiah
2019	Love Mocktail	Krishna Talkies	Darling Krishna
2020	Varnapatala	• Kavitha Santhosh • Saraswati Hosdurga	Chethan Mundadi
2021	777 Charlie	Paramvah Studios	Kiranraj K.

== See also ==
- Karnataka State Film Award for First Best Film
- Karnataka State Film Award for Third Best Film
