= Karnataka State Film Award for Best Director =

Indian film award

- State award for contributions to Kannada cinema
- Awarded for: Director Of The First Best Film
- Sponsored by: Government of Karnataka
- Rewards: Gold Medal; ₹ 1,00,000
- First award: 1967-68
- Final award: 2021
- Most recent winner: Prakash Kariappa

Highlights
- Total awarded: 56
- First winner: Puttanna Kanagal

Karnataka State Film Award for Best Director is a film award of the Indian state of Karnataka given during the annual Karnataka State Film Awards. The award honors Kannada-language films and is presented to the director of the film that wins the First Best Film award. The award is named after H. L. N. Simha, the first director of Kannada Cinema who was brought First National Award to Kannada Cinema.

The award is usually given to the director of the Karnataka State Film Award for First Best Film.

== Superlatives ==
Awardees	wins
Girish Kasaravalli	6 times
Puttanna Kanagal	5 times
T. S. Nagabharana	3 times

== Award winners ==
The following is a complete list of award winners and the name of the films for which they won.

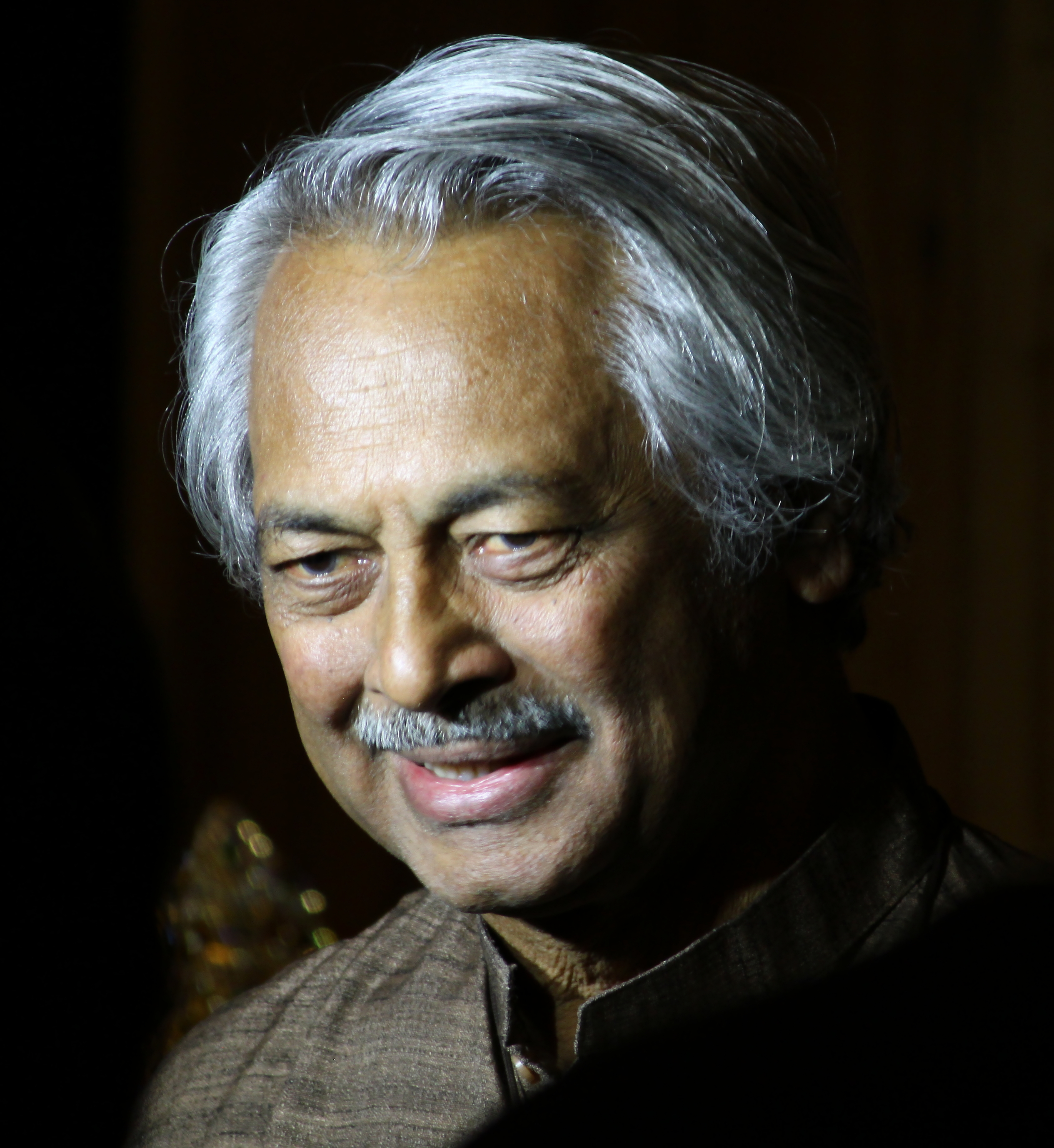
Girish Kasaravalli, the highest number of award winner with 6 awards

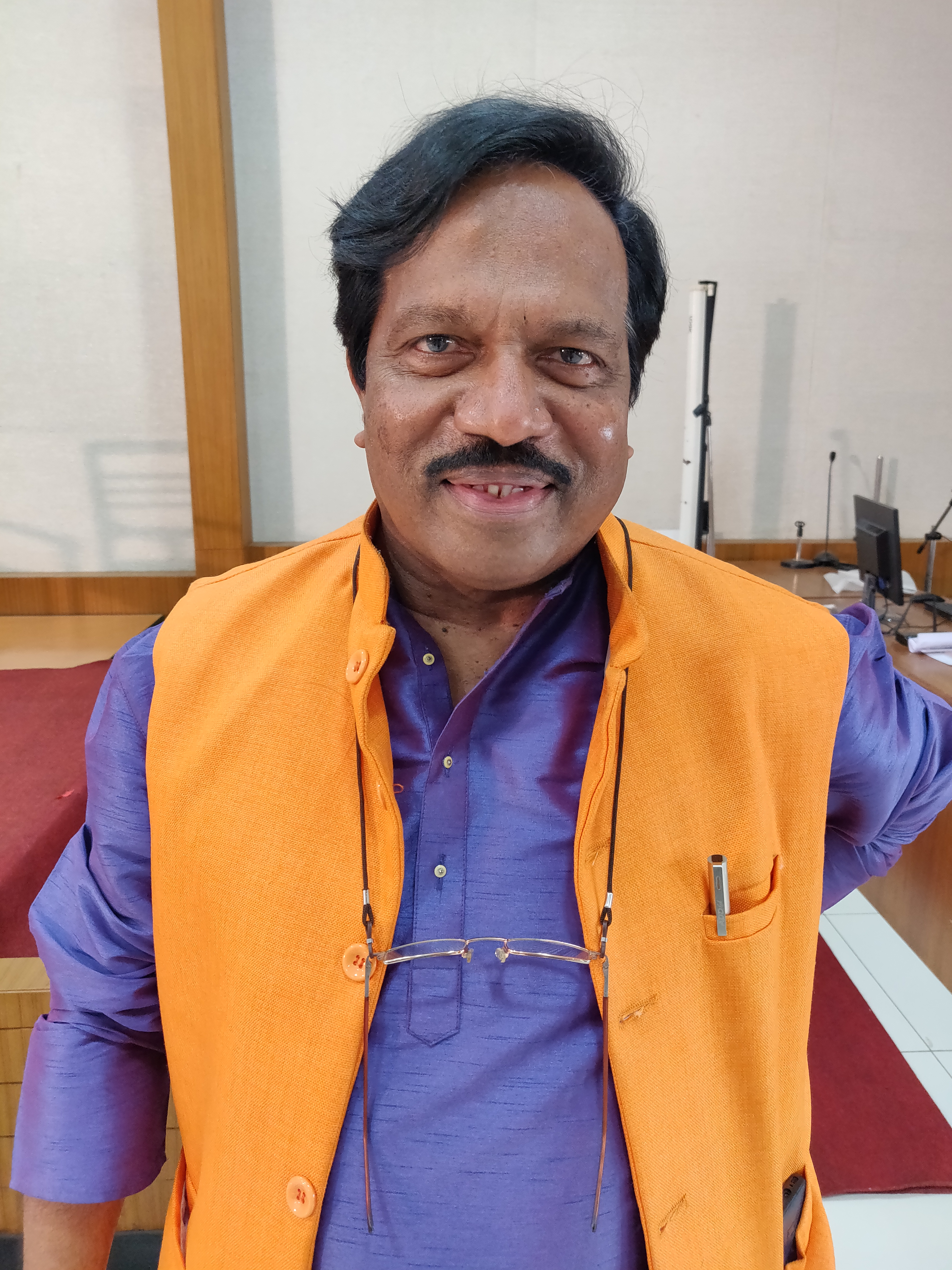
Nagabharana won the award thrice

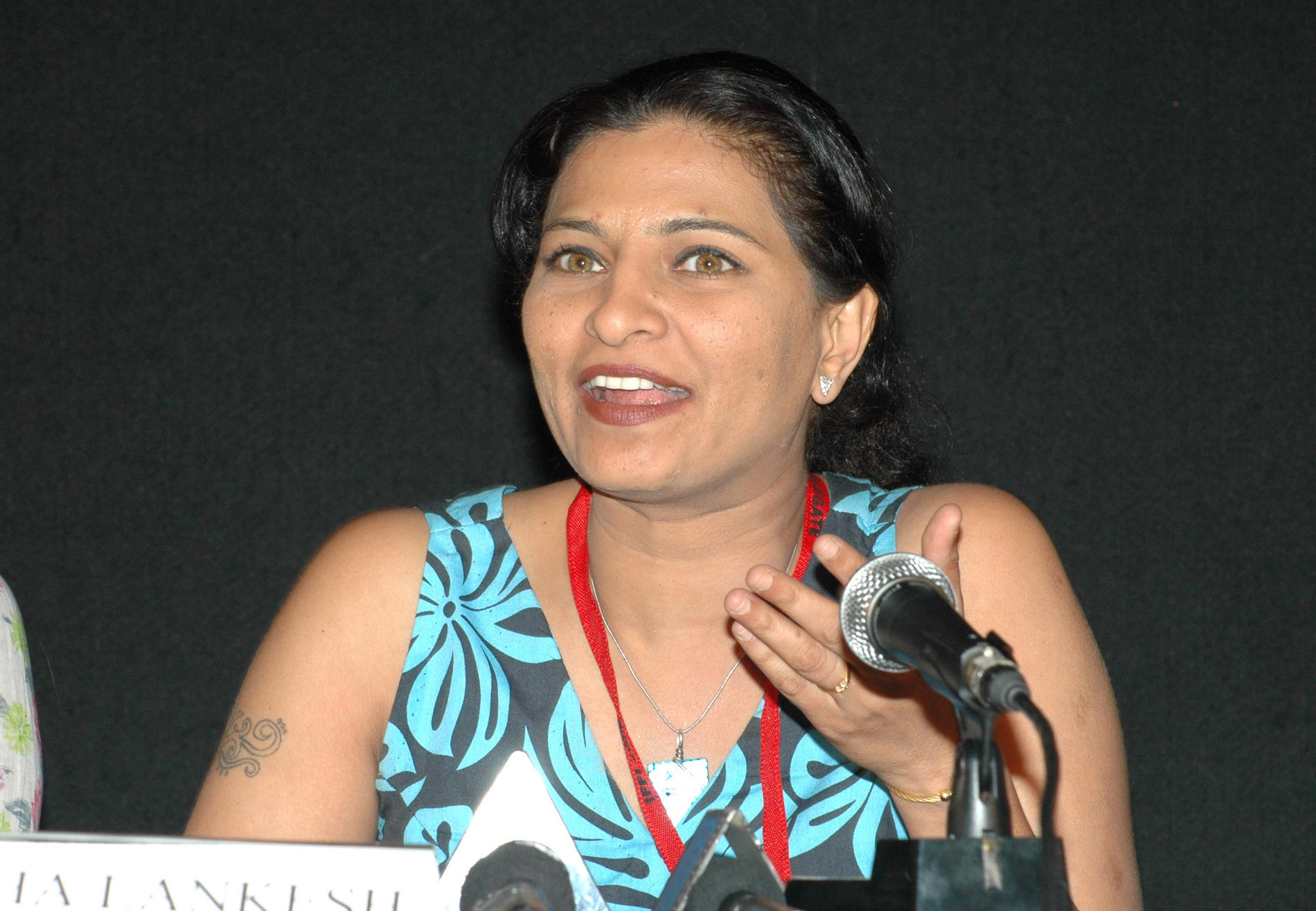
Kavita Lankesh, the only woman director to win the award till date

Year	Winner	Film	Ref.
2021	Prakash Kariappa	Nada Peda Asha	
2020	Prithvi Konanur	Pinki Elli	
2019	P. Sheshadri	Mohandas	
2018	Dayal Padmanabhan	Aa Karaala Ratri	
2017	Adarsh Eshwarappa	Shuddhi	
2016	B. M. Giriraj	Amaravathi	
2015	Raam Reddy	Thithi	
2014	Manjunath S. Reddy	Harivu	
2013	Nikhil Manjoo	Hajj	
2012	N. Sudarshan	Thallana	
2011	Manoj K. Sathi	Prasad	
2010-11	K. Shivarudraiah	Maagiya Kaala	
2009-10	Ruthwik Simha	Rasarushi Kuvempu	
2008-09	Narendra Babu	Kabaddi	
2007-08	P. R. Ramadas Naidu	Moggina Jade	
2006-07	Yogaraj Bhat	Mungaaru Male	
2005-06	Girish Kasaravalli	Naayi Neralu	
2004-05	Indrajith Lankesh	Monalisa	
2003-04	T. S. Nagabharana	Chigurida Kanasu	
2002-03	B. Suresha	Artha	
2001-02	Girish Kasaravalli	Dweepa	(Note: The Deccan Herald article incorrectly bolded Ravichandran for Ekangi (the winner of the state award for second best film) as the best director instead of Girish Kasaravalli for Dweepa (the winner of the state award for first best film) .)
2000-01	P. R. Ramadas Naidu	Mussanje	
1999-2000	Kavitha Lankesh	Deveeri	
1998-99	K. Shivarudraiah	Chaithrada Chiguru	
1997-98	Girish Kasaravalli	Thaayi Saheba	
1996-97	Nagathihalli Chandrashekhar	America America	
1995-96	Chindodi Bangaresh	Sangeetha Sagara Ganayogi Panchakshara Gavai	
1994-95	Vasanth Mokashi	Gangavva Gangamaayi	
1993-94	Sunil Kumar Desai	Nishkarsha	
1992-93	Dorai - Bhagwan	Jeevana Chaitra	
1991-92	Ravindranath	Veerappan	
1990-91	S. V. Rajendra Singh Babu	Muthina Haara	
1989-90	Sadananda Suvarna	Kubi Matthu Iyala	
1988-89	N. T. Jayarama Reddy	Yaaru Hone	
1987-88	T. S. Nagabharana	Aasphota	
1986-87	Girish Kasaravalli	Tabarana Kathe	
1985-86	K. V. Jayaram	Hosa Neeru	
1984-85	Shankar Nag	Accident	
1983-84	Baraguru Ramachandrappa	Benki	
1982-83	Singeetam Srinivasa Rao	Haalu Jenu	
1981-82	M. S. Sathyu	Bara	
1980-81	Puttanna Kanagal	Ranganayaki	
1979-80	Katte Ramachandra	Arivu	
1978-79	T. S. Nagabharana	Grahana	
1977-78	Girish Kasaravalli	Ghatashraddha	
1976-77	P. Lankesh	Pallavi	
1975-76	B. V. Karanth	Chomana Dudi	
1974-75	Puttanna Kanagal	Upasane	
1973-74	Siddalingaiah	Bhootayyana Maga Ayyu	
1972-73	P. V. Nanjaraja Urs	Sankalpa	
1971-72	Girish Karnad	Vamsha Vriksha	
1971-72	B. V. Karanth	Vamsha Vriksha	
1970-71	Puttanna Kanagal	Sharapanjara	
1969-70	Puttanna Kanagal	Gejje Pooje	
1968-69	M. R. Vittal	Hannele Chiguridaga	
1967-68	Puttanna Kanagal	Belli Moda	

== See also ==
- Cinema of Karnataka
- List of Kannada-language films
