= Moggina Jade =

Indian drama film

- DVD cover
- Directed by: P. R. Ramadas Naidu
- Written by: P. R. Ramadas Naidu
- Produced by: P. R. Ramadas Naidu; Beerappa
- Starring: Baby Shrisha; Aniruddha Sastry; Pavitra Lokesh; Rajesh Nataranga; Sringeri Ramanna; Malathishree
- Cinematography: S Ramachandra
- Edited by: Thulasi Kishore
- Music by: L. Vaidyanathan
- Production company: Naidu Studio Productions
- Release dates: 2007 (festivals); 18 April 2008
- Country: India
- Language: Kannada

Moggina Jade (transl. The Plait of Jasmine Buds) is a 2008 Indian Kannada-language drama film written, produced, and directed by P. R. Ramadas Naidu starring Baby Shrisha, Aniruddha Sastry, Pavitra Lokesh, Rajesh Nataranga, Sringeri Ramanna and Malathishree.

The film was screened at the Indian Panorama section of the International Film Festival of India and the International Children's Film Festival in 2007.

== Plot ==
Moggina Jade, which is a plaited jasmine braided hair extension, is traditionally worn by small girls in Southern Karnataka. Priya is denied her jasmine braid since her mother Rekha is modern and against Priya wearing it. Although her father Raghavendra was traditional, he changed after marrying Rekha. Her paternal grandmother Sarasamma hands the jasmine braid to her son Raghavendra, but the maid Nagarathna ends up getting it. Priya ends up getting isolated from her family and befriends a gypsy she meets on the road. How her family finds her and allows her to wear the jasmine braid forms the rest of the story.

== Cast ==
- Baby Shrisha as Priya
- Aniruddha Sastry as Sashi (credited as Master Aniruddh)
- Pavitra Lokesh as Rekha
- Rajesh Nataranga as Raghavendra
- Sringeri Ramanna as Srikantaiah
- Malathishree as Sarasamma
- Shailaja Joshi
- Aruna Balraj

== Release and reception ==
Along with Gulabi Talkies (2008), the film was only released in film festivals and did not have a theatrical release.

R. G. Vijayasarathy of Rediff.com rated the film two-and-a-half out of five stars and wrote that "Moggina Jade is a film for those who want to see artistic films. But this is not a patch on Naidu's previous film, Mussanje, a classic".

== Accolades ==
Event	Category	Recipient	Ref.
2007–08 Karnataka State Film Awards	Second Best Film	Moggina Jade	
2007–08 Karnataka State Film Awards	Best Director	P. R. Ramadas Naidu	
2007–08 Karnataka State Film Awards	Best Supporting Actor	Rajesh Nataranga	
