= Eswaran Thangavel =

Indian cinematographer

- Born: 20 September 1986 (age 40); Komarapalayam, Namakkal, Tamilnadu, India
- Occupation: Cinematographer

Eswaran Thangavel (born 20 September 1986) is an Indian cinematographer and producer and actor known for his works in Tamil, Malayalam and Telegu Cinema and has to date completed 3 feature films and 4 short films.

== Career ==
Eswaran Thangavel, a cinematographer from south India, graduated from DG Vaishnav College in BSc Visual Communication and later pursued a Diploma in Television and Film Technology from M.G.R. Government Film and Television Training Institute

He won the award the best cinematographer at Jaipur International film festival 2017 for Kerala Pardiso.

== Filmography ==
Key
†	Denotes films that have not yet been released

Year	Film	Language	Notes
2016	Railway Children	Kannada	
2016	Kerala Paradiso	Malayalam	
2021	Brandy Diaries	Telugu	
