= Nimde Kathe =

2025 Indian drama film

- Theatrical release poster
- Directed by: Raghavendra
- Produced by: Srinivasa Reddy; Aravind US
- Starring: Abhilash Dalapathi; Rashika Shetty
- Cinematography: Prashanth Sagar
- Edited by: Sunil S.
- Music by: Praveen Nikethan
- Production company: Blue Sky Studios
- Release date: 4 April 2025
- Country: India
- Language: Kannada

Nimde Kathe (transl. Your story) is a 2025 Indian Kannada-language drama film directed by Raghavendra. The film stars Abhilash Dalapathi and Rashika Shetty.

== Cast ==
- Abhilash Dalapathi as Vikram
- Rashika Shetty as Kavya
- Sihi Kahi Chandru as Doctor
- Manohar Gowda
- K. V. Manjaiah
- K. S. Ravindranath
- Jyothi Murur
- Hanumanth Ninasam
- Reshma V. Gowda as Bubbly
- Shridhar
- Manjunath Bhatt Meena
- Shailaja Sharma
- Vilas
- Santhosh
- Arun
- Adarsh Rangayana
- Nagendra Karate
- Kishore Vashista
- Bhaskar Male
- Prabhu Raj

== Soundtrack ==
The soundtrack was composed by Praveen Nikethan with lyrics by Raghavendra.

Track listing
| No. | Title | Singer(s) | Length |
|---|---|---|---|
| 1. | "Balondu Mullina Santhe" | Prithwi Bhat | 3:23 |
| 2. | "Dhad Nan Magane" | Naveen Sajju | 3:37 |
| 3. | "Ivane Namma" (Male Version) | Aniruddha Sastry | 4:28 |
| 4. | "Ivane Namma" (Female Version) | Prithwi Bhat | 3:01 |
| 5. | "Payanigana Payana" | Rajesh Krishnan | 1:36 |
| Total length: | | | 16:05 |

== Release ==
Nimde Kathe was released theatrically on 4 April 2025.

== Reception ==
Sridevi S. of The Times of India rated the film two-and-a-half out of five stars and wrote, "While Abhilash Dalapathi’s performance and the film’s real-life connections keep it engaging, the disjointed narrative, weak supporting performances, and technical shortcomings hold it back. It’s a film that could have been powerful but ultimately doesn’t come together as well as it should." Varun Keval of The Hans India wrote, "One downside of the movie is its length. A trim of 10 to 15 minutes could have made it more engaging."

A. Sharadhaa of The New Indian Express wrote, "Despite its many flaws, the film is commendable for handling oft-overlooked themes in a familiar setting revolving around relatable characters". Y. Maheswara Reddy of Bangalore Mirror wrote, "The drawback of the movie is its runtime. Had the director reduced the runtime by 10 to 15 minutes, the movie would have been a good entertainer."
