= Taledanda (film) =

- Directed by: Praveen Krupakar
- Produced by: Hema Malini Krupakar; Arun Kumar R (co-producer)
- Starring: Sanchari Vijay; Chaithra J. Achar; Mangala N B. Suresha; Ramesh Pandit; Mandya Ramesh
- Cinematography: Ashok Kashyap
- Edited by: B S Kemparaju
- Music by: Hari-Kavya
- Production company: Kripanidhi Kreations
- Release dates: November 2021 (IFFI); 1 April 2022 (India)
- Country: India
- Language: Kannada

Taledanda is a 2021 Kannada-language Indian film directed by Praveen Krupakar starring Sanchari Vijay in the lead role.

The film premiered at the 2021 International Film Festival of India and continued to show at other film festivals. At the 2020 Karnataka State Film Awards, the film won multiple awards including Best supporting actor (Ramesh Pandit), Best Cinematographer (Ashok Kashyap) and two Karnataka State Jury's Special Award (Sanchari Vijay for acting & Ramesh Babu for production).

== Plot summary ==
Taledanda is the story of Kunnegowda (Kunna), a boy who is fond of trees and plants.

== Cast ==
- Sanchari Vijay as Kunne Gowda "Kunna"
- Chaithra J. Achar as Saaki
- Mangala N. as Kethamma
- B. Suresha as Prof. Prakruthi
- Ramesh Pandit as Jademada
- Mandya Ramesh as MLA Doddaranga
- Bhavani Prakash as Niveditha
- Sparsha Shenoy as Prakruthi maathe
- Rajesh S. Rao as Dr. Pai
