= Prithvi Konanur =

Indian film director

- Occupations: Director, writer, producer
- Years active: 2008–present

Prithvi Konanur is an Indian film director, who works in Kannada cinema.

== Career ==
Konanur's first notable film was Railway Children (2016). The film premiered at the Jio Mami Mumbai Film Festival.

Pinki Elli (2020) is inspired by a true incident that took place in the city of Bengaluru. It's about a missing baby and features first time actors. The film had its world premiere at the Busan International Film Festival. It became the first film to be nominated under all the three competitive sections at the fourteenth Bengaluru International Film Festival where it won the Kannada film category. The film became the first Kannada film to be selected as the 'Opening Film' at the New York Indian Film Festival in 2021, earning 3 nominations and winning awards in two sections.

His most recent film is Hadinelentu (2022), a film about an intimate video being leaked; however, the video is deliberately never shown as he felt it was unnecessary to the story. The film had its world premiere at the Busan International Film Festival where Prithvi Konanur was nominated for the Kim Jiseok Award. The film was chosen as the 'Opening Film' under the Indian Panorama section of the International Film Festival of India.

He next produced Mikka Bannada Hakki (2024) through his production company Konanur Productions, a coming-of-age story, which premiered at the Shanghai International Film Festival under the Asian New Talents section with five nominations including Best Film.

== Filmography ==
Year	Film	Dicector	Producer	Screenwriter	Notes
2012	Alegalu	Yes	No	Yes	
2016	Railway Children	Yes	Yes	Yes	Won - Karnataka State Film Award for Second Best Film
2020	Pinki Elli?	Yes	No	Yes	Won - Karnataka State Film Award for Best Director
2022	Hadinelentu	Yes	Yes	Yes	Won - Filmfare Award for Best Director - Kannada
2024	Mikka Bannada Hakki	No	Yes	No	

== Awards and nominations ==
Prithvi Konanur has received several national and international accolades for his work as a filmmaker. This is a list of select wins and nominations.

Film	Year	Award	Category	Result
Railway Children	2016	Mumbai Film Festival	Golden Gateway Award	Nominated
Railway Children	2017	Karnataka State Film Awards	Second Best Film	Won
Railway Children	2017	Zlín International Film Festival	Ecumenical Jury Special Mention	Won
Railway Children	2017	International Film Festival of India	ICFT UNESCO Gandhi Medal	Nominated
Pinki Elli?	2020	Karnataka State Film Awards	Best Director	Won
Pinki Elli?	2020	Karnataka State Film Awards	Best Film	Won
Pinki Elli?	2021	New York Indian Film Festival	Best Screenplay	Won
Pinki Elli?	2021	New York Indian Film Festival	Best Film	Nominated
Pinki Elli?	2021	Bengaluru International Film Festival	Best Kannada Film	Won
Pinki Elli?	2021	Prague International Film Festival (Febiofest)	Amnesty International Award	Nominated
Pinki Elli?	2021	Indian Film Festival of Melbourne	Best Director (Honorary Mention)	Won
Pinki Elli?	2024	Filmfare Awards South	Best Film (Critics) – Kannada	Won
Hadinelentu	2023	Busan International Film Festival	Kim Jiseok Award	Nominated
Hadinelentu	2023	Indian Film Festival of Melbourne	Best Director	Won
Hadinelentu	2023	Bengaluru International Film Festival	Second Best Kannada Film	Won
Hadinelentu	2025	Filmfare Awards South	Best Director – Kannada	Won
Hadinelentu	2025	Filmfare Awards South	Best Film – Kannada	Nominated
