= Marakkar: Lion of the Arabian Sea (soundtrack) =

2021 film songs by Ronnie Raphael

Soundtrack album by Rahul Raj
- Released: 1 August 2021
- Recorded: 2018–2020
- Genre: Film score
- Length: 60:05
- Label: Saina Music

Rahul Raj chronology
The Priest (2020)	Marakkar: Lion of the Arabian Sea (2021)	Aaraattu (2021)

Marakkar: Lion of the Arabian Sea is the soundtrack to the 2021 Indian period drama action film of the same name directed by Priyadarshan. The film features five songs composed by Ronnie Raphael, whilst the original score is composed by Rahul Raj, Ankit Suri and Lyell Evans Roeder. The album features lyrics written by Prabha Varma, B. K. Harinarayanan, Shafi Kollam for the Malayalam version, and Priyadarshan, R. P. Bala, Samji for the Tamil version, whereas the lyricists for the dubbed versions are: Vennelakanti (Telugu), Aniruddha Sastry, Vybhav M (Kannada), Nawab Arzoo and Ishtiaq Feroz (Hindi). The album released through Saina Music on 1 August 2021.

== Composition ==
The original score was composed by Rahul Raj, Ankit Suri and Lyell Evans Roeder. Suri and Roeder, composers of Alternative Fidelity, a British-American music production house were hired to produce and arrange the score for battle sequences in the film, thereby marking their debut in Indian cinema. A few months later, Rahul Raj, who completed his post-graduation from Berklee College of Music was hired to independently compose and produce the rest of the score. Raj was chosen by Priyadarshan after being impressed watching a video of him conducting a 52-piece London orchestra at Air Studios, as part of his thesis in Berklee.

While scoring, Raj avoided giving a regional touch to the music which would have been easier for a film set in Malabar, as Priyadarshan was clear that he was making a film which caters for a global audience and it should resonate in its music too. Deviating from his usual norm, Priyadarshan gave full creative freedom to Rahul Raj for scoring, who is known for giving references and definitive instructions to his composers. His only instruction was to imagine as if he is working for a Hollywood epic and compose with that on mind. Raj wanted a soundscape that could bring an epic feel as in films produced during the golden age of Hollywood. He mentioned Ben-Hur and The Ten Commandments as examples. Raj stated that the score of Marakkar "had to have a global resonance", remarking that the team effort which went into the film’s composition and sound design would pay off.

Beside composing, Rahul Raj also performed programming and production entirely by himself as opposed to have additional programmers in many regular film scores. The Chennai Strings Orchestra read string pieces for some of the significant portions.

== Production ==
In the initial stage, Priyadarshan planned only fours songs in the film, with one being instrumental. His plan was to experiment by diving three songs to three composers. However, all songs were finally given to Ronnie Raphael, who worked with Priyadarshan's film Anamika, a short segment in the anthology series Forbidden Love. He composed five songs for the film. Recording began as early as November 2018, even before the filming was started. The songs were sung by K. S. Chithra, M. G. Sreekumar, Vineeth Sreenivasan, Shweta Mohan, Shreya Ghoshal and Zia Ul Haq, with lyrics by Prabha Varma, B. K. Harinarayanan, Shafi Kollam, and Priyadarshan.

Raphael stated that he was given to sing two or three songs, before being hired to compose the original songs. The following day, the first track "Kunju Kunjali" was recorded which was being a lullaby. For the track "Kannil Ente", Priyadarshan asked to include a Sufi version of the track. He first arranged the melody portion of the song which was well received by the director, and then he incorporated the Sufi version of the track later. All the tracks in the film were composed according to the periodic setting, except for "Ilaveyil". which was given a modern attempt. The tracks are arranged in such a manner that they intertwine with the story and context. As few sequences being set in China, a part of the storyline, Priyadarshan showed Raphael a Chinese music instrument which did not exist in the current time. As the sound was very hard to crack, he mixed the particular song using Ukulele and Keyboard for two of the tracks.

== Marketing and release ==
The music rights of the film were purchased by Saina Video Vision, based subsidiary audio label Saina Music. On 10 February 2021, the first single track "Kunju Kunjali", sung by K. S. Chithra was released in all languages. The flute cover of this track, performed by Josy Alappuzha was released on 22 February 2021, through YouTube, and was later released on digital music platforms on 3 March 2021 as a track in the album. The song teaser of the second track, "Kannil Ente" was released on 24 March 2021, whereas the full song was released a week later, on 31 March 2021. The third track "Chembinte Chelulla", sung by Vishnu Raj was released in all languages on 21 May 2021, marking Mohanlal's birthday. The full album was released on digital music platforms on 1 August 2021. On 10 November 2021, the theme of "Marakkar" composed by Rahul Raj, was launched through streaming platforms and also on YouTube. The album is also released through Saina's mobile application and online portal named Saina Play.

== Song track listing ==
Malayalam
No.	Title	Lyrics	Artist(s)	Length
1.	"Kunju Kunjali"	B. K. Harinarayanan	K. S. Chithra,M.G.Sreekumar	4:16
2.	"Kannil Ente"	B. K. Harinarayanan, Shafi Kollam	Vineeth Sreenivasan, Shweta Mohan, Zia Ul Haq	5:34
3.	"Chembinte Chelulla"	Priyadarshan	Vishnu Raj	0:53
4.	"Ilaveyil"	Prabha Varma	M. G. Sreekumar, Shreya Ghoshal	5:28
5.	"Neeye En Thaaye"	B. K. Harinarayanan	K. S. Harisankar, Reshma Raghavendra	3:32
6.	"Kunju Kunjali" (Instrumental)		Josy Alappuzha	2:42

Tamil
No.	Title	Lyrics	Artist(s)	Length
1.	"Kannae Kunyaali"	R. P. Bala	K. S. Chithra	2:58
2.	"Kangal Endra"	R. P. Bala, Shafi Kollam	Karthik, Shweta Mohan, Zia Ul Haq	5:35
3.	"Singathanam"	R. P. Bala	Vishnu Raj	0:54
4.	"Ilaveyil"	R. P. Bala	Sathya Prakash, Chinmayi	5:28
5.	"Neeye En Thaaye"	Samji	Sreekanth Hariharan, Reshma Raghavendra	3:32
6.	"Kannae Kunyaali" (Instrumental)		Josy Alappuzha	2:42

Hindi
No.	Title	Lyrics	Artist(s)	Length
1.	"Nanhe Kunjali"	Nawab Arzoo	K. S. Chithra	2:58
2.	"Aankhon Mein"	Nawab Arzoo, Shafi Kollam	Karthik, Shweta Mohan, Zia Ul Haq	5:34
3.	"Pyaaraa Kunjali"	Nawab Arzoo	Vishnu Raj	0:54
4.	"Madhdham"	Ishtiaq Feroz	Sathya Prakash, Chinmayi	5:28
5.	"Hey Nandalala"	Nawab Arzoo	Sreekanth Hariharan, Reshma Raghavendra	3:32
6.	"Nanhe Kunjali" (Instrumental)		Josy Alappuzha	2:42

Telugu
No.	Title	Lyrics	Artist(s)	Length
1.	"Chinni Kunjali"	Vennelakanti	K. S. Chithra	2:58
2.	"Kallaninda Kalalu"	Vennelakanti, Shafi Kollam	Karthik, Shweta Mohan, Zia Ul Haq	5:34
3.	"Manasunna Kunjaali"	Vennelakanti	Vishnu Raj	0:54
4.	"Kanulanu Kalipina"	Vennelakanti	Sathya Prakash, Chinmayi	5:28
5.	"Paalinchu Thalli"	Vennelakanti	Sreekanth Hariharan, Reshma Raghavendra	3:32
6.	"Chinni Kunjali" (Instrumental)		Josy Alappuzha	2:42

Kannada
No.	Title	Lyrics	Artist(s)	Length
1.	"Muddu Kunjalige"	Aniruddha Sastry	K. S. Chithra	2:58
2.	"Kande Kande"	Aniruddha Sastry, Shafi Kollam	Karthik, Vandana Srinivasan, Zia Ul Haq	5:34
3.	"Manasiro Kunjali"	Aniruddha Sastry	Vishnu Raj	0:54
4.	"Manasali"	Vybhav M	Sathya Prakash, Chinmayi	5:28
5.	"Aalisu Tayee"	Vybhav M	Sreekanth Hariharan, Reshma Raghavendra	3:32
6.	"Muddu Kunjalige" (Instrumental)		Josy Alappuzha	2:42
