= Maathaad Maathaadu Mallige =

- Directed by: Nagathihalli Chandrashekhar
- Written by: Nagathihalli Chandrashekhar
- Produced by: K. Manju
- Starring: Vishnuvardhan; Suhasini Maniratnam
- Cinematography: Krishna Kumar
- Edited by: Basavaraj Urs
- Music by: Mano Murthy
- Production company: Lakshmishree Combines
- Release date: 24 August 2007
- Running time: 150 minutes
- Country: India
- Language: Kannada

Maathaad Maathaadu Mallige (transl. Speak, Speak out, Jasmine) is a 2007 Indian Kannada-language film written and directed by Nagathihalli Chandrashekhar. It stars Vishnuvardhan in the lead role. Suhasini Maniratnam, Doddanna, Rangayana Raghu, Lokesh and Ashok Rao feature in supporting roles. The plot revolves around a flower farmer (Vishnuvardhan) who leads his village's resistance against a powerful mining project that threatens their land, livelihoods and way of life.

K. Manju produced the film under the banner Lakshmishree Combines. Music for the film was composed by Mano Murthy, while Krishna Kumar and Basavaraj Urs served as cinematographer and editor respectively. The film was released theatrically on 24 August 2007, and received generally favorable reviews from critics who praised the subject matter. The film received numerous accolades including three nominations at the 55th Filmfare Awards South. It received two awards at the 2007–08 Karnataka State Film Awards — Third Best Film and Best Lyricist (Gollahalli Shivaprasad).

== Plot ==
Hoovaiah, a principled flower farmer, lives in the village of Jenukoppa with his wife Kanaka and their three daughters — Mallika, Sampige and Jaji. The village is known for cultivating numerous varieties of flowers, some of which are considered rare. Hoovaiah is an educated and respected figure among the villagers. While Sampige and Jaji attend college, Mallika, who has not completed her education, is often ridiculed by her family for being less educated than her sisters.

An international mining corporation, USD, discovers deposits of kimberlite ore in and around Jenukoppa and seeks government approval to acquire agricultural land for diamond mining. The government offers compensation packages and employment opportunities to the villagers in exchange for their land. Kurupayya, a local intermediary with political connections, attempts to persuade the villagers to accept the proposal. Hoovaiah opposes the project and has a public interest litigation filed in the High Court through his advocate friend seeking to prevent mining licences from being granted. When government officials, including Deputy Commissioner Pradyumna, arrive to negotiate with the villagers, many are initially convinced by promises of compensation and development. However, Hoovaiah argues that the land is their livelihood and warns against the long-term consequences of such projects. His stand influences the villagers to withdraw their support for the acquisition. During this period, Sampige falls in love with Pradyumna and marries him despite Hoovaiah's objections, though he eventually accepts her decision.

As resistance to the project intensifies, the government resorts to force. Police action against protesting villagers results in violence and arrests. Meanwhile, Jaji leaves home and marries television reporter George against her parents' wishes. With two daughters gone and tensions mounting in the village, Hoovaiah and Kanaka are left emotionally distressed. Hoovaiah is later invited to a meeting with government and company representatives, where he reiterates his opposition to the mining project, citing examples of displacement, environmental degradation and loss of livelihoods caused by similar developments elsewhere. While negotiations continue, another confrontation erupts in Jenukoppa. A golibar has led to casualties, including Kanaka. Hoovaiah returns to find his wife dead and is devastated. Despite the protests, mining licences are approved and operations begin.

Determined to continue the struggle through legal means, Hoovaiah takes the case to the Supreme Court. The conflict gains national attention, transforming Jenukoppa into a symbol of resistance against forced land acquisition. Amid the unrest, a naxal leader, who labels himself as a revolutionary, and his followers arrive in the village. Believing that violence is the only way to fight oppression, they recruit Mallika to their cause. The group carries out a bomb attack on a bridge, killing Kurupayya, the Indian head of USD, the local MLA Shivaram, and the police superintendent associated with the crackdown on the villagers. Hoovaiah condemns the killings and distances himself from the extremists, remaining committed to non-violent protest. Adopting Gandhian methods, he begins a hunger strike demanding justice for the villagers and an end to mining activities. The fast attracts nationwide media coverage and support from farmers across the country. After ten days, news arrives that the Supreme Court has granted a stay on the mining operations. Viewing the decision as a victory for the villagers' struggle, Hoovaiah ends his fast, while the extremist group departs to continue its movement elsewhere.

== Cast ==
- Vishnuvardhan as Hoovaiah
- Suhasini Maniratnam as Kanaka
- Doddanna as Kaala, a villager
- Tara as Jummi, a villager
- Rangayana Raghu as Kurupayya
- Mandya Ramesh as Vatise, a villager
- Sihi Kahi Chandru as Sheera, a villager
- Komal as Gende, Kaala's son
- Tejaswini Prakash as Jaji
- Nivedhitha as Mallika (credited as Smitha)
- Rashmi Kulkarni as Sampige
- Lokesh as District Commissioner Pradyumna
- Santhosh Aryan as George, television reporter
- C. R. Simha as MLA Shivaram
- Bank Janardhan as villager
- Nagathihalli Chandrashekhar as advocate
- Arun Sagar as Ugri, a villager
- Suresh Mangalore as Minister of Mines and Forest Kalleshappa
- Vaijanath Biradar as boatman
- Srikant Heblikar as Assistant Commissioner
- Ashok Rao as the India head of USD
- Shivaji Rao Jadhav as villager
- R. G. Vijayasarathy as a journalist (uncredited role)
- Shankar Ashwath as police superintendent (uncredited role)
- Sudeep in a cameo appearance as a naxal leader

== Production ==
Maathaad Maathaad Mallige marked the first collaboration between director Nagathihalli Chandrashekhar and actors Vishnuvardhan and Suhasini Maniratnam. Vishnuvardhan was cast as a farmer who opposes the acquisition of agricultural land by a multinational corporation seeking to establish diamond mining operations in a village. The film was produced by K. Manju. Mano Murthy, who previously collaborated with Chandrashekhar, was hired to compose the film's score and soundtrack.

Chandrashekhar stated that the story examines the impact of globalization, industrial development and land acquisition on rural communities, and explores the relationship between political power and corporate interests. Principal photography took place in several rural locations across Karnataka, including parts of Bellary, Karwar, Mysore and Dakshina Kannada districts.

== Soundtrack ==
Maathaad Maathaadu Mallige

Soundtrack album by Mano Murthy
- Genre: Feature film soundtrack
- Length: 34:53
- Label: Jhankar Music

Mano Murthy scored music for the film's background and the soundtrack. The soundtrack album consists of nine tracks, with lyrics penned by Nagathihalli Chandrashekhar and Gollahalli Shivprasad.

Track listing
No.	Title	Lyrics	Singer(s)	Length
1.	"Baaro Nam Terige"	Nagathihalli Chandrashekhar	Rajesh Krishnan, Nanditha, B. Jayashree	4:59
2.	"Jhana Jhana"	Gollahalli Shivprasad	C. Aswath	4:53
3.	"Nammane Aramane"	Nagathihalli Chandrashekar	S. P. Balasubrahmanyam, Nanditha, Vidya, Amrutha, Shantala Vattam	4:44
4.	"Elli Hodavo"	Gollahalli Shivprasad	Picchalli Srinivas	4:19
5.	"Banna Bannada Hoove"	Nagathihalli Chandrashekar	S. P. Balasubrahmanyam, Shreya Ghoshal	4:56
6.	"Elli Hodavo (Pathos)"	Gollahalli Shivprasad	Praveen Datt Stephen	5:26
7.	"Bevara Hanigale"	Gollahalli Shivprasad	Picchalli Srinivas, Gollahalli Shivprasad, Jenny	0:37
8.	"Appikonda"	Gollahalli Shivprasad	Shantala Vattam	0:51
9.	"Baaro Nanna Sharukh"	Nagathihalli Chandrashekar	Sunidhi Chauhan	4:08
Total length:				34:53

== Release and reception ==
Maathaad Maathaadu Mallige was released on 24 August 2007. The film was also released in San Jose, California, United States, the same day.

The film got positive reviews from critics upon its release. Rediff.com gave 4/5 stars saying "Maathaad Maathaadu Mallige is not a film with slow paced narration; it is a commercial film with a good message. A must-see film.". The Times of India gave 4/5 stars and wrote "VISHNUVARDHAN'S brilliance and an excellent script by Nagathihalli Chandrasekhar make Mathad Mathadu Mallige a film worth watching".

== Awards and nominations ==
Award	Date of ceremony	Category	Recipient(s)	Result	Ref.
Southern India Cinematographer's Association Awards	2008	Best Writer	Nagathihalli Chandrashekhar	Won	
Southern India Cinematographer's Association Awards	2008	Best Cinematographer	Krishna Kumar	Nominated	
Udaya Film Awards	2008	Best Cinematography	Krishna Kumar	Won	
Filmfare Awards South	12 July 2008	Best Film – Kannada	K. Manju	Nominated	
Filmfare Awards South	12 July 2008	Best Director – Kannada	Nagathihalli Chandrashekhar	Nominated	
Filmfare Awards South	12 July 2008	Best Actor – Kannada	Vishnuvardhan	Nominated	
Karnataka State Film Awards	2009	Third Best Film	K. Manju	Won	
Karnataka State Film Awards	2009	Best Lyricist	Gollahalli Shivaprasad	Won	

== See also ==
- Land acquisition in India
- Floriculture
