= Aniruddha Sastry =

Indian musical artist (born 1997)

- Born: 23 January 1997 (age 29); Mysore, Karnataka, India
- Genres: Filmi, Melody, Classical music, Devotional music
- Occupations: Playback singer; Music director; Actor; Dubbing artist
- Years active: 2005–2011 (Acting); 2017–present (Music)

Aniruddha Sastry (born 23 January 1997) is an Indian playback singer, actor, music director, lyricist and dubbing artist primarily associated with the Kannada film and television industry. Sastry began his singing career with devotional and classical compositions before transitioning into mainstream cinema. His playback debut came with the Kannada film Kidi in 2017 and over the years, Sastry has lent his voice to numerous tracks across Kannada films. He gained recognition as a performer in devotional and film music, and has also appeared in Kannada films, including roles as a child artist.

In 2020, he achieved a significant milestone by winning the Karnataka State Film Award for Best Male Playback Singer for his performance in the film Acharya Sri Shankara. This honor added to his earlier achievement as a child actor when he received the Karnataka State Film Award for Best Child Actor for Rakshasa (2005).

== Early life ==
Born on January 23, 1997, Sastry completed his education at Hymamshu Jyothi Kala Peetha. His musical journey began early, and in 2005, he debuted as a child actor in the Kannada film Rakshasa, portraying Shiva Rajkumar's son. This performance earned him the Karnataka State Film Award for Best Child Actor in 2005. Alongside acting, Sastry actively participated in several prominent singing reality shows. Notably Sa Re Ga Ma Pa L'il Champs (Kannada). He hosted programs such as Little Star Singer and Chinnara Camp, appearing on channels like Zee Kannada and Star Suvarna.

Sastry appeared as a child artist in several Kannada films including Shubham (2006), Care Of Footpath (2006), Thutturi (2007), Masti (2007), Moggina Jade (2008), Circus (2009), Maduve Mane (2011), Dhool (2011), and Jackie (2010). He later played a negative lead in Gosi Gang (2019).

== Career ==
=== Playback singing & music direction ===
Aniruddha Sastry made his playback singing debut in the Kannada film Kidi (2017), marking his entry into the music industry. The song "Preethi Inda" was a duet composed by Emil Mohammed and included vocals of Anuradha Bhat. In the same year he did a solo song with Ravi Dev for the film Engineers. Following his debut, Sastry contributed to soundtracks for films such as Dhairyam (2017), Dandupalya 3 (2018), and Ambi Ning Vayassaytho (2018). During this period, he also began performing title tracks and high-energy numbers, establishing his presence in commercial cinema.

In 2020, Sastry achieved a major milestone by winning the Karnataka State Award for Best Singer for his rendition in the devotional film Acharya Sri Shankara. This recognition elevated his status as a leading playback singer in the Kannada industry. He also released popular singles such as “Forever RCB,” which became an anthem for cricket fans.

Sastry continued to deliver hit tracks in films like Pogaru (2021), Roberrt (2021), and Kranti (2022). His songs during this phase included title tracks and thematic compositions, blending traditional and contemporary styles. He also ventured into independent music with singles like “Love Ge No No” and “Candy Flip.” In 2023, Sastry released the title track for CSI Sanatan and the cricket anthem “RCB 12th Man Army.” He also contributed to major film soundtracks, including the theme song for Kaatera, which gained significant popularity.

By 2025, Sastry expanded his role beyond playback singing, debuting as a music director and lyricist with the single Love U Muddu. He also contributed to major film projects like Mahavatar Narsimha (Kannada and Malayalam versions), composing and performing tracks such as “Roar of Narsimha” and “Asura Theme.”

Other notable works include songs for Bagheera, Mark, and Timepass, reflecting his evolution into a multifaceted music professional.

== Discography ==
=== Playback singer ===
Year	Title	Song(s)	Music director(s)	Co-singer(s)	Notes
2017	Kidi	"Preethi Inda"	Emil Mohammed	Anuradha Bhat	Debut film as a Playback Singer; Credited as Aniruddh
2017	Engineers	"Mathalli Helalu Aagada"	Ravi Dev		
2018	Parasanga	"Kaadiro Coffee"	Harshavardhan Raj	Hemanth, Jogi Sunitha, Madvesh	
2018	Bhairava Geetha	"Iruvi Goodnaag" "Ee Daasyada Mushtiyu"	Ravishankar	Indu Nagaraj, Shashank Sheshagiri	
2019	Kaddu Muchchi	"Promise Priya"	Hamsalekha	Supriya Acharya	
2019	Modala Hejje	"Modala Notake" "Premankura"			
2019	Kapata Nataka Paatradhaari	"Manadaalada Maathu" "Bitt Hode Nee Doora"	Adil Nadaf		
2020	Veshadhari	"Aase Aase"	V. Manohar		
2020	India vs England	"Jai Jai Jai"	Arjun Janya		
2020	Mounam	"Ninna Usiralliye"	Arav Rishik	Shwetha Devanahally	
2020	Pogaru	"Jeeva Kottavalu"	Chandan Shetty		
2020	Varnapatala	"Hosa Daari Saaride"	Harshavardhan Raj		
2020	Soorarai Pottru	"Mannaki" "Naguthale" "Karshanabe"	G. V. Prakash Kumar		
2021	Roberrt	"Ba Ba Ba Na Ready"	Arjun Janya	Vyasaraj Sosale, Santhosh Venky, Supreeth Phalguna, Nikhil Parthasarathy	
2021	Hitler	"Bandukina Chapu"	Akash Parva	Chethan Naik, Pancham Jeeva	
2022	Dear Sathya	"Jopana Jopana"	Sridhar V. Sambhram	Shwetha Devanahally	
2022	Ganduli	"Disco Bandaithalla" "Huli Huli Huli"	Ravidev	Vijay Prakash, Vedika	
2022	Avatara Purusha	"Manthra"	Arjun Janya		
2022	Local Train	"Whats Up"	Arjun Janya	Shruthi	
2022	Sara Vajra	"Nikah" "Chigurida Hoovagi" "Aalada Maradanthe"	V. Manohar	Prathima Bhat, Jannath Naz, Anuradha Bhat, Chinmay	
2022	Khadak	"Bisi Bisi Hudugi"	M. N. Krupakar	Pooja	
2022	Window Seat	"Nee Nasukina"	Arjun Janya	Anuradha Bhat	
2022	Shiva 143	"Nanthak Baa"	Arjun Janya	Mangli, Santhosh Venky, Chethan Naik	
2022	Ravi Bopanna	"Heronu Ivane"	V. Ravichandran	Santhosh Venky, Madhwesh Bharadwaj	
2022	Raana	"Gully Boy"	Chandan Shetty	Aditi Sagar	
2022	Pampa	"Kannike Kannike" "Hosa Kanase" "Naadee Geethe"	Hamsalekha		
2022	Raja Rani Roarer	"Jodi Etthu"	Prabhu S R	Ravi Basrur	
2022	Raymo	"Ninnade Ninnade"	Arjun Janya	Indu Nagaraj, Sanjith Hegde	
2023	Kranti	"Don't Mess With Him" "Dharani"	V. Harikrishna	Ranjith, Tippu, Pancham Jeeva, Santhosh Venky, Madhwesh Bharadwaj, Vihan, Lakshmi Vijay, Khushala	
2023	Gowli	"Maha Rakkasa"	Shashank Sheshagiri	Shashank Sheshagiri, Madhwesh Bharadwaj	
2023	Gadayuddha	"Akki Bele Dabba"	S Solomon	Hemanth	
2023	Bengaluru Boys	"Bengaluru Boys" "Thodaladuva"	Dharma Vish		
2023	O Manase	"Bhoomine Kusidu Hodanthe"	Jassie Gift		
2023	Don Kumara	"Nenapu Nenapu"	Arav Rishik		
2023	Aura	"Preethiya Amanthrana"	Girish Hotthur	Arundhathi Hegde, Ajith Keshava, Girish Hotthur	
2023	CSI Sanatan	"Title song"	Aneesh Solomon		Telugu film
2023	Garadi	"Garadi Title Track"	V. Harikrishna	V. Harikrishna, Shashank Sheshagiri, Santhosh Venky, Chethan Sosca	
2023	Royal Mech	"Banda Banda Dude" "Janma Kotta Thayi"	Rizwan Ahamed	Anjana S	
2023	Kaatera	"Kaatera theme"	V. Harikrishna	Abhishek M R, Madhwesh Bharadwaj, Vishak Nagalapura	
2023	Avalakki Pavalakki	"Naa Abhimani"	Zubin Paul	Zubin Paul	
2024	Kailasa Kasidre	"Senorita"	Ashik Arun	Madhuri Sheshadri	
2024	Bharjari Gandu	"Sukka Sarayigintha" "Kaadu Kootha Chandira"	Gummineni Vijay	Naveen Sajju, Aishwarya Rangarajan	
2024	Desai	"Holi Hunnime Habbakka"	Sai Karthik		
2024	Karki	"Dun Dun Nakkadi" "Naan Yaar" "Vaale Jummukki"	Arjun Janya; Abhay Anand	Mookuthi Murugan, Parthiban	
2024	Gowri	"Dhool Yebsava"	Shivu Bergi	Ananya Bhat	
2024	Yala Kunni	"Naraka Thumbi"	Dharma Vish	Dharma Vish, Chethan Naik, Shashank Sheshagiri	
2024	Bagheera	"Rudhira Dhaara" "Stun Gun"	B. Ajaneesh Loknath	Amogh Balaji	
2024	Tenant	"Nagunagutha Edebaditha" "Kanna Muchche Kaade Goode"	Girish Hothur		
2024	Naa Ninna Bidalare	"Muddu Gombe"	M. S. Thyagaraj		
2024	Max	"The Hunter Song"	B. Ajaneesh Loknath	Amogh Balaji	
2025	Nimde Kathe	"Ivane Namma"	Praveen Nikethan		
2025	FIR 6 to 6	"Kachiko Kachiko"	Sathish Babu	Uma Neha	
2025	Mahavatar Narsimha	"Roar of Narasimha" "Asura Theme"	Sam C. S.	Sam C. S.	Sung in Kannada, Tamil, Telugu and Malayalam versions
2025	Yarigu Helbedi	"Kaldode"	Shashank Sheshagiri		
2025	Love U Muddu	"Eegeega Nanaganthu"	Himself	K. S. Chithra	
2025	I Am God	"Haavan Bekar Katko"	B. Ajaneesh Loknath	Shashank Sheshagiri, Aishwarya Rangarajan	
2025	Thammudu	"Slokam"	B. Ajaneesh Loknath		Telugu film
2025	The Task	"Dhaga Dhaga"	Judah Sandhy	Chinmayi L, Nadeera Banu, Meghana Kulkarni Joshi	
2025	Acharya Sri Shankara	Various songs	Arjun Janya		Karnataka State Film Award for Best Male Playback Singer
2025	Odela 2	"Yemulada Rajanna"	B. Ajaneesh Loknath		Telugu film
2025	Bicchugatthiya Bantana Ballirena	"Waah! Veerane"	Sri Sastha		
2025	The Devil	"Alhomora"	B. Ajaneesh Loknath		
2025	Vrusshabha	"Theme song"	Sam C. S.		Telugu & Malayalam film
2025	Mark	"Psycho Saithan" "The Kaali Song"	B. Ajaneesh Loknath	Vijay Prakash	
2026	Rakkasapuradhol	"Villain Theme"	Arjun Janya		
2026	Operation D	"Mayavi" "Kavana"	Vedhika, Santhosh	Vedhika; Prithwi Bhat	
2026	Bail	"Shivanna Anthem"	B. Ajaneesh Loknath	B. Ajaneesh Loknath	

=== Lyricist ===
Year	Title	Song(s)	Music director(s)	Singers
2020	Kaanadante Mayavadanu	"Kone Iradantha Preethige"	Gummineni Vijay	Vijay Prakash
2020	Soorarai Pottru	"Mannaki" "Naguthale" "Kande Kande" "Usire" "Sundara" "Karshanabe" "Aakasha"	G. V. Prakash Kumar	Various
2021	Pogaru	"Jeeva Kottavalu"	Chandan Shetty	Himself
2021	Lanke	"Pipipi"	Karthik Shetty	Tippu, Varijashree Venugopal
2021	Jagame Thandhiram	"Rakita Rakita"	Santhosh Narayanan	Ashwin Sharma, Divya Ramachandra, Velu Krishnamurthy
2021	Marakkar: Lion of the Arabian Sea	"Muddu Kunjalige" "Kande Kande" "Manasiro Kunjali"	Ronnie Raphael	K. S. Chithra, Karthik, Vandana Srinivasan, Zia Ul Haq, Vishnu Raj
2023	Bengaluru Boys	"Bengaluru Boys" "Thodaladuva"	Dharma Vish	Himself
2024	Hanu-Man	"Vajrakaaya Anjaneya" "Hoovamma Hoove"	Anudeep Dev, GowraHari	Sahithi Galidevara, Yogi Shekar
2024	Bharjari Gandu	"Kaadu Kootha Chandira" "Amigo Go Go"	Gummineni Vijay	Aishwarya Rangarajan, Gummineni Vijay
2024	Bagheera	"Rudhira Dhaara"	B. Ajaneesh Loknath	Himself
2025	Mahavatar Narsimha	"Roar of Narasimha" "Om Namo Bhagavathe Vasudevaya" "Hariya Kathe" "Nannalliruva Prana Nee" "Asura Theme"	Sam C. S.	Sam C. S., Vijay Prakash, Sanjith Hegde, Shivatmika, Rihanna, Chinmayi Sripada
2025	Bhuvanam Gaganam	"Bhuvana Gagana" "Hrudayave Chooru Nillu" "I Got This Feeling" "Ee Bhuvana Aa Gagana"	Gummineni Vijay	Armaan Malik, Aishwarya Rangarajan, Sanjith Hegde, Pruthvi Bhat, Javed Ali
2025	Love U Muddu	"Love You Muddu"	Himself	Sonu Nigam, Aishwarya Rangarajan, Surabhi Bharadwaj
2025	The Devil	"Idre Nemdiyaag Irbek" "Alhomora"	Deepak Blue	

== Filmography ==
- Source

=== As a child actor ===
- Rakshasa (2005)
- Care of Footpath (2006)
- Pandavaru (2006)
- Shubham (2006)
- Honganasu (2007)
- Operation Ankusha (2007)
- Moggina Jade (2008)
- Jackie (2010)
- Vishnu (2011)
- Noorondu Bagilu (2011)
- Dhool (2011)

=== As a dubbing artist ===
- Shankara Punyakoti (2009)
- Naa Rani Nee Maharani (2010)
- Huduga Hudugi (2010)
- Porki (2010)
- Police Story 3 (2011)
- Kirataka (2011)
