= Chethan Mundadi =

Indian filmmaker and art director

- Years active: 2003–present
- Notable work: Madipu (2017)

Chethan Mundadi is an Indian filmmaker and art director known for his work in Tulu and Kannada cinema.

== Career ==
Chethan Mundadi worked as an art director for several Kannada films and television shows including Kariya (2003), Apthamithra (2004), SaReGaMaPa and Comedy Khiladigalu. He made his debut as a director with the Tulu film Madipu (2017), which was screened at the Bengaluru International Film Festival. The film won the National Film Award for Best Feature Film in Tulu and the Karnataka State Film Award for Best Regional Film. His next film was the Kannada film Varnapatala (2020), which is based on autism and won the Karnataka State Film Award for Second Best Film.

He has since worked on two unreleased films including Pravesha, based on cow vigilantism, and Bhavapoorna. He was also briefly attached to a Kannada-Tulu bilingual film starring Pruthvi Ambaar although the film did not enter production.

== Filmography ==
=== As film director ===
Year	Film	Language	Notes
2017	Madipu	Tulu	
2020	Varnapatala	Kannada	

=== As an art director ===
Year	Title	Language	Notes
2003	Kariya	Kannada	
2004	Apthamithra	Kannada	
	SaReGaMaPa	Kannada	
	Comedy Khiladigalu	Kannada	
2009	House Full	Kannada	
