= Madipu =

- Theatrical release poster
- Directed by: Chethan Mundadi
- Produced by: Sandeep Kumar Nandalike
- Starring: Sardar Sathya: M. K. Matta; Seetha Kote; Sujatha Shetty
- Cinematography: Ganesh Hegde
- Edited by: Srikanth
- Music by: V. Manohar
- Production company: Astha Productions
- Release date: 10 March 2017
- Running time: 115 minutes
- Country: India
- Language: Tulu

Madipu is a 2017 Indian Tulu film directed by Chethan Mundadi. Highlighting the futility of the orthodox traditions practiced in the region of Tulu Nadu, the film focuses on Bhootaradhane, a practice of worshipping and appeasing demigods; Buta Kola; and relations between the Hindus and Muslims in the region. The plot revolves around the trouble with depression the protagonist goes through as he steps out of the said practises that he had previously been observing.

The film stars Sardar Sathya, M. K. Matta, Seetha Kote and Sujatha Shetty in the lead roles. It was produced by Sandeep Kumar Nandalike under the banner Astha Productions. Music for the film was composed by V. Manohar. The film was selected to be screened at the 9th Bengaluru International Film Festival in February 2017. Upon theatrical release in March, it was received well by critics and audiences alike. At the 64th National Film Awards, it was awarded the Best Feature Film in Tulu under the category of Best Feature Film in Each of the Language Other Than Those Specified In the Schedule VIII of the Constitution. At the 2016 Karnataka State Film Awards, it was named the Best Regional Film.

== Cast ==
- Sardar Sathya as Buta
- M. K. Matta
- Seetha Kote
- Sujatha Shetty
- Ila Vitla
- Nagaraja Rao
- Chetan Rai Kini
- Hanumanthappa
- Jyothi Rai
- Shreya (credited as Baby Shreya)
- Dayanand Bettapadi

== Awards ==
- 64th National Film Awards - Best Feature Film in Tulu
- Karnataka State Film Award for Best Regional Film
