= Jagame Thandhiram (soundtrack) =

2021 soundtrack album by Santhosh Narayanan

- Soundtrack album cover

Soundtrack album by Santhosh Narayanan
- Released: 6 June 2021
- Recorded: 2019–2021
- Genre: Feature film soundtrack
- Length: 36:21
- Language: Tamil
- Label: Sony Music India
- Producer: Santhosh Narayanan

Santhosh Narayanan chronology
Karnan (2021)	Jagame Thandhiram (2021)	Vellai Yaanai (2021)
External audio
- Jagame Thandhiram – Jukebox on YouTube

Singles from Jagame Thandhiram
- 1. "Rakita Rakita Rakita" Released: 28 July 2020; 2. "Bujji" Released: 13 November 2020; 3. "Nethu" Released: 22 May 2021

Jagame Thandhiram (transl. The world is tricky) is the eleven-song soundtrack album composed by Santhosh Narayanan for the 2021 Tamil film of the same name, starring Dhanush and directed by Karthik Subbaraj. The film marks Narayanan's fourth collaboration with Dhanush, following Kodi, Vada Chennai and Karnan, and continues his association with Subbaraj, who had worked with Anirudh Ravichander on Petta. The album featured lyrics by Vivek, Dhanush, Arivu, Anthony Daasan and Madurai Babaraj, and was released by Sony Music India on 6 June 2021.

== Production ==
Composition for the film's soundtrack and score began in July 2019. Narayanan and members of the film's core team traveled to London during the first filming schedule. While Vivek, Dhanush, and Anthony Daasan were credited as lyrisists, Arivu and Madurai Babaraj joined the team later in the process. Additionally. Narayanan revealed in an online interview that Dhanush served as the music supervisor for the soundtrack. Although the album was originally slated for release under YNOT Music, a subsidiary of YNOT Studios, the audio rights were acquired by Sony Music in mid-July 2020.

Subbaraj, a frequent collaborator with Narayanan, requested a distinct musical approach for this project. The pair worked extensively on the score to reflect the cultural aspects of the two countries depicted in the film. Narayanan noted, "It was imperative that we stayed as rooted as possible to the themes that we are showcasing in the movie". Because a significant portion of the film is set in Tamil Nadu, Narayanan conducted extensive research to ensure the music remained authentic. The director and composer engaged in substantial pre-production to develop a unique sound palette for the score.

Santhosh had further added that he got an opportunity to work with new talents in the world for the music of the film. He added that since "the film is British in many ways" as major part of the film being set in London, Santhosh had to collaborate with British and Scottish folk bands and musicians. He also explored Madurai's folk music for the film, further adding that his presence during the shoot of the film he had a clear thought about the music and setting, which had Santhosh to make changes for the album in the shooting spot itself. He recorded the song "Rakita Rakita" live outside his studio, which is his first song to do so, saying that "the song is an expression" and it "wanted it to be a listener's experience".

== Release ==
"Rakita Rakita Rakita" was the first song to be composed. Dhanush himself sang the song, with additional vocals provided by Santhosh Narayanan and Dhee, with Vivek writing the lyrics for the song. Vivek stated that "the song was a happy song, but I wrote it during the difficult phase of my life". He further added, "Rakita Rakita is all about happiness being a choice. We shouldn't live based on what others say, nor should we estimate our worth based on others' judgments". It was initially featured as a theme music in the motion poster which went viral upon release. The song was scheduled to release in March 2020, but eventually postponed as YNOT Studios suspended all activities of production in response to the COVID-19 pandemic. Later, the song was unveiled on 28 July 2020, coinciding with Dhanush's birthday. The second single titled "Bujji", sung by Anirudh Ravichander, was released on the eve of Diwali day, on 13 November 2020. The third single "Nethu" which was sung and written by Dhanush, was released on 22 May 2021.

The original tracklist of the film containing 8 tracks were revealed by Sony Music India through the official Twitter handle on 5 June 2021. A series of posters featuring track details and also giving credits to the singers, songwriters and musicians performing the tracks, where released one by one through social media. Santhosh Narayanan later unveiled a full tracklist through his Twitter account which had additional three instrumentals adding to the eight-song soundtrack. The album also feature a Telugu version with Bhaskarabhatla, Krishna Kanth and Kittu Vissapragada writing the lyrics and sung by different singers, unlike the original version. Both the Tamil and Telugu versions of the soundtrack released on 6 June 2021, through digital streaming platforms with the audio jukebox and lyric videos being unveiled the following day, on 7 June 2021. The soundtracks for the dubbed Kannada and Malayalam versions were released on 13 and 14 June 2021. Lyrics for the Kannada version were written by Aniruddha Sastry, Vyabhav, Raathee, Varadaraj Chikkaballapura and Ghouse Peer, while Deepak Ramakrishnan and Engandiyoor Chandrasekharan penned the Malayalam tracks.

To celebrate the success of the soundtrack, Karthik Subbaraj, Santhosh Narayanan and the musical team of Jagame Thandhiram conducted a session on 7 June through Twitter Spaces which was hosted by stand-up comedian-cum-actor Alexander Babu. Dhanush too joined the session marking it as the actor's first debut through the live-audio conversation platform. Apart from the film's music and songs, the team shared few interesting facts about the film with the crew members and fans. The session saw more than 17,000 participants and became the highest attended Twitter Spaces session, surpassing that of Zack Snyder's Army of the Dead (which earlier had 12,000 participants). Its record was later broken by #CelebrateThalapathyWithRoute, another session which had 27,600 listeners.

== Music videos ==
The songs were choreographed by Baba Bhaskar, Sherif and Jani Master. During the London schedule, two songs, "Bujji" and "Nethu", were filmed. Jani Master choreographed the dance sequences for the song "Bujji" featuring Dhanush. The second song, "Nethu", was picturised on the characters of Dhanush and Aishwarya Lekshmi going on a date in London. "Rakita Rakita Rakita" was picturised in Madurai, during the second schedule of the film, which featured Dhanush dancing in a wedding function. The song was choreographed by Baba Bhaskar, who also appeared in a pivotal role in the film.

In an interview with online news portals, director Karthik Subbaraj had stated that the songs "Bujji", "Nethu" and "Aala Ola" will not be featured in the film and they are used only for promotional purposes. It was reported that the video songs which unveiled ahead of the film's release, served as "spoilers for the audience". Further considering the length of the film, the team felt that the songs may affect the pace of the film's narration, which the makers had decided to remove three songs from the film. But Subbaraj stated that the songs will be featured in its television premiere. Following public demand, the makers released the video song of "Aala Ola" on 28 July 2021, coinciding actor Dhanush's birthday.

== Reception ==
The soundtrack album opened to positive reviews from critics. Writing for Hindustan Times, Karthik Keramalu assigned a score 4 (out of 5) saying that "Santhosh has proved his mettle once again with this incredible album, which surely is one of Dhanush's best soundtracks in recent times". Ashuthosh Mohan of Film Companion South, called the album "is designed to sound great in the background, set the mood and get out of the way", while also stating it as a "different one from Iraivi and Jigarthanda (the previous films of the Karthik-Santhosh combo)" and also out of "Santhosh's Kaashmora-zone modified to create a 'mass' sound".

In an article about 2020 Jukebox for Cinema Express, Ashameera Aiyyapan stated about the first single "Rakita Rakita", that the "raw energy of the song is bonkers, in a good way". She also added that the number also doubles up as an "inspirational and motivational song". She quoted a couple lines from the song "Enakku raja va naa vazhuren; Edhuvum illenalum aaluren" (I live and rule my life as king, even if I do not have anything in hand), and quoted that "The words gain immeasurable depth while we place them in the context of the pandemic, where lives and livelihoods continue to get annihilated. But the song leaves us with renewed hope." Reviewing for the second song "Bujji", Film Companion stated the song as "a likeable composition and may don't have to listen to it multiple times to get into the groove".

"Rakita Rakita" was listed in 7 Tamil Songs that is needed in your playlist, a yearender special article from The News Minute, written by Anjana Shekar. Music critic Devarsi Ghosh of Scroll.in stated that "The folksy percussion, the horns, and the wry cheerfulness of the tune make us to enter the song and start dancing". It is also listed in the 5 Chartbuster Tamil Songs of 2020 by The Times of India.

== Track listing ==
Tamil
No.	Title	Lyrics	Singer(s)	Length
1.	"Rakita Rakita Rakita"	Vivek	Dhanush, Santhosh Narayanan, Dhee	4:07
2.	"Bujji"	Vivek	Anirudh Ravichander, Santhosh Narayanan	4:27
3.	"Nethu"	Dhanush	Dhanush	3:51
4.	"Aala Ola"	Vivek	Anthony Daasan, Santhosh Narayanan	3:32
5.	"Theengu Thaakka"	Arivu	Arivu, GKB, Santhosh Narayanan	2:50
6.	"Theipirai"	Madurai Babaraj	Meenakshi Elayaraja, Santhosh Narayanan	5:46
7.	"Kalarey Kalarvasam"	Anthony Daasan	Anthony Daasan	3:04
8.	"Naan Dhaan Da Mass"	Arivu, OfRo	Arivu, OfRo, Santhosh Narayanan	3:56
9.	"Suruli (Theme)"	–	Instrumental	1:22
10.	"Barotta Master (Theme)"	–	Instrumental	2:33
11.	"London Street (Theme)"	–	Instrumental	1:03
Total length:				36:21

Telugu
No.	Title	Lyrics	Singer(s)	Length
1.	"Rakita Rakita Rakita"	Bhaskarabhatla	Ananthu, Santhosh Narayanan, Susha	4:08
2.	"Bujji"	Bhaskarabhatla	Santhosh Narayanan	4:26
3.	"Neetho"	Bhaskarabhatla	Vijaynarain	3:51
4.	"Rela Rela"	Bhaskarabhatla	Anthony Daasan	3:32
5.	"Veta Veta Veta"	Krishna Kanth	Santhosh Narayanan	2:35
6.	"Veltunnara"	Kittu Vissapragada	Savitha Sai	5:44
7.	"Nurellu Nindipoyayaa"	Bhaskarabhatla	Sannidhanandhan	3:04
8.	"Naa Thotti Race-u"	Bhaskarabhatla, OfRo	OfRo, Santhosh Narayanan	3:47
9.	"Suruli (Theme)"	–	Instrumental	1:20
10.	"Barotta Master (Theme)"	–	Instrumental	2:33
11.	"London Street (Theme)"	–	Instrumental	1:05
Total length:				36:05

Kannada
No.	Title	Lyrics	Singer(s)	Length
1.	"Rakita Rakita"	Aniruddha Sastry	Ashwin Sharma, Divya Ramachandra, Velu Krishnamurthy	4:07
2.	"Dhimta Taka Taka"	Vybhav	Ashwin Sharma	2:34
3.	"Nane The Massu-u"	Raathee	Raathee	3:50
4.	"Kanase Karagogi"	Varadaraj Chikkaballapura	Velu Krishnamurthy	3:07
5.	"Nethi Mele Thoogo Kathi"	Ghouse Peer	Divya Ramachandra	3:53
6.	"Suruli (Theme)"	–	Instrumental	1:21
7.	"Barotta Master (Theme)"	–	Instrumental	2:30
8.	"London Street (Theme)"	–	Instrumental	1:01
Total length:				22:25

Malayalam
No.	Title	Lyrics	Singer(s)	Length
1.	"Rakita Rakita"	Deepak Ramakrishnan	Renjith Unni, Sannidhanandan, Surmukhi Raman	4:07
2.	"Dheengu Thaakka"	Deepak Ramakrishnan	Vishnu Sukumaran	2:33
3.	"Njan Ennaal Mass"	Deepak Ramakrishnan	Shenbagaraj	3:50
4.	"Nnniramo Thelirkanthi"	Engandiyoor Chandrasekharan	Sannidhanandan	3:06
5.	"Neela Nilaa"	Engandiyoor Chandrasekharan	Savitha Sai	5:44
6.	"Suruli (Theme)"	–	Instrumental	1:21
7.	"Barotta Master (Theme)"	–	Instrumental	2:30
8.	"London Street (Theme)"	–	Instrumental	1:01
Total length:				24:14

== Background score ==
Jagame Thandhiram

Film score by Santhosh Narayanan
- Released: 21 July 2021
- Recorded: 2019–2021
- Genre: Feature film soundtrack
- Length: 36:21
- Language: Tamil
- Label: Sony Music
- Producer: Santhosh Narayanan
External audio
- Jagame Thandhiram – OST Jukebox on YouTube

The original soundtrack by Santhosh Narayanan, featured 16 tracks including the three instrumentals released within the soundtrack album. It was launched by Sony Music India on 21 July 2021.

No.	Title	Length
1.	"Barotta Master^{[a]}"	2:33
2.	"International Suruli"	1:21
3.	"London Boys"	1:03
4.	"London Street^{[a]}"	1:00
5.	"Memories"	1:23
6.	"Namma Suruli"	1:03
7.	"Peter"	1:24
8.	"Pothitu Poda"	0:41
9.	"Rat Found"	2:58
10.	"Refugees"	1:37
11.	"Shoot Out"	1:50
12.	"Sivadoss Killed"	1:52
13.	"Sivadoss"	0:37
14.	"Suruli^{[a]}"	1:21
15.	"Verum Paper"	1:10
16.	"Warzone"	1:51

Notes

- ^{^a} Tracks 1,4,14, from the original soundtrack, were released within the soundtrack album.

== Personnel ==
Credits adapted from Sony Music South

- Santhosh Narayanan – Composer (All tracks), producer (All tracks), programmer (All tracks), musical arrangements (All tracks), backing vocals (Track 3,5), whistle (Track 3), flute (Track 6), audio recording (Future Tense Studios, Chennai) [All tracks], audio mixing (Karma Studios, Thailand & Future Tense Studios, Chennai) [Track 1,2,6], audio mastering (Future Tense Studios, Chennai) [Track 6]
- Rohith Fernandes – Chorus (Track 6)
- Pravin Saivi – Chorus (Track 6)
- Britto – Chorus (Track 6)
- Chinna – Chorus (Track 6)
- Joseph Vijay – Acoustic guitar (Track 1,2,3,6), electric guitar (Track 8)
- Michael Murray – Electric guitar (Track 2)
- Keba Jeremiah – Electric guitar (Track 8)
- Naveen – Bass (Track 1,2,4,6)
- Ron Miller – Bass (Track 2)
- Viji – Trumpet (Track 1)
- Giovanni Campanelli – Keys (Track 1), clarinet (Track 1)
- Rahul Muralidhar – Drums (Track 2)
- Dian Klass – Drums (Track 2)
- Giles Lewin – English pipes (Track 4), fife (Track 4), fiddle (Track 4)
- Raphael Mizraki – Tabor (Track 4), low drum (Track 4), tambourine (Track 4)
- Jeicha – Urumi (Track 4)
- Segar – Nadaswaram (Track 7)
- Pichakani – Pambai (Track 7)
- Rajinimurugan – Thavil (Track 7)
- Anthony Daasan – Urumi (Track 7)
- Ganapathy – Tapes (Track 7)
- Buddhar Kalai Kuzhu – Rhythm (Track 1)
- Thiruvannamalai Kuzhu – Percussions (Track 4)
- RK Sundar – Percussions (Track 4,6,7)
- Macedonian Symphonic Orchestra (Track 6)
- Glenn Keiles – Audio recording (Sputnik Studios, London) [Track 4], side drum (Track 4), clackers (Track 4)
- Sukumar NSR – Audio recording (Future Tense Studios, Chennai) [Track 1,2]
- RK Sundar – Audio recording (Future Tense Studios, Chennai & Lynx Studios, Toronto) [Track 1,2,4], audio mixing (Future Tense Studios, Chennai) [Track 1,4,7], audio mastering (Future Tense Studios, Chennai) [Track 1,4,7]
- Sai Shravanam – Audio mixing (Resound India, Chennai) [Track 2,3,5,8], audio mastering (Resound India, Chennai) [Track 2,3,5,8]
- Kurt Martinez – Recording assistance (Track 4)
- Meenakshi Santhosh – Musicians coordinator
