= Love U Muddu =

Indian Kannada language romantic drama film

- Theatrical release poster
- Directed by: Kumaar L
- Written by: Kumaar L
- Produced by: Kishan T. N.
- Starring: Siddu Moolimani; Reshmaa L Rajesh Nataranga; Tabla Nani
- Cinematography: Krishna Deepak
- Edited by: C. S. Deepu
- Music by: Aniruddha Sastry
- Production company: Kishan Enterprises
- Release date: 7 November 2025
- Running time: 125 minutes
- Country: India
- Language: Kannada

Love U Muddu is a 2025 Kannada language romantic drama film written and directed by Kumaar L. The film is produced by Kishan T. N under his banner Kishan Enterprises. The film stars Siddu Moolimani and Reshmaa in the lead roles along with Rajesh Nataranga, Tabla Nani and Girish Subbaiah in key supporting roles. The music for the film is composed by Aniruddha Sastry and cinematography is by Krishna Deepak.

The film is based on the real life love story of young couple Akash Narayankar and Anjali Shinde (famous as anjalibai official) from Solapur. Filming took place around Bangalore and Karkala districts of Karnataka, India.

== Cast ==
- Siddu Moolimani as Karna
- Reshmaa L as Sumati
- Rajesh Nataranga
- Tabla Nani
- Girish Shivanna
- Srivatsa Shyam as Dinesh
- Apoorva
- Swathi Gurudatth

== Soundtrack ==
The soundtrack was composed by Aniruddha Sastry and the audio was marketed by MRT Music. The single "Love You Muddu" was released on 14 September 2025.

Track listing
| No. | Title | Lyrics | Singer(s) | Length |
|---|---|---|---|---|
| 1. | "Eegeega Nanaganthu" | Siddu Kodipura | K. S. Chithra, Aniruddha Sastry | 4:49 |
| 2. | "Baruthide Aluvu" | Kumar | Jaskaran Singh | 4:13 |
| 3. | "Love U Muddu" | Aniruddha Sastry | Sonu Nigam, Aishwarya Rangarajan, Surabhi Bharadwaj | 4:13 |
| Total length: | | | | 13:02 |

== Reception ==
Susmita Sameera from The Times of India rated the film 3 stars out of 5 and summarized "The message of Love You Muddu is simple yet powerful. When you truly love someone, commitment itself becomes an act of courage. It becomes the act of choosing again and again even when everything is against you. If you are someone who connected with films like Love 360 or the Love Mocktail series, this film is definitely worth watching for its genuine heart and emotional honesty".
