= P. R. Ramadas Naidu =

- Occupations: Director, screenwriter, producer, author
- Years active: 1978–present
- Notable work: Mussanje, Moggina Jade, Hejjegalu, Giliyu Panjaradolilla

P. R. Ramadas Naidu is an Indian director, screenwriter, producer, and author, who works in Kannada-language art films.

== Filmography ==
Year	Title	Credited as			Notes
Year	Title	Director	Writer	Producer	Notes
1978	Ondu Oorina Kathe	No	No	No	As actor and dubbing artist
1978	Aparachita	No	Lyrics	No	Also actor
1982	Amara Madhura Prema	Yes	Yes	Yes	
2001	Mussanje	Yes	Yes	Yes	Won—Karnataka State Film Award for Best Director; Won—Karnataka State Film Award for Best Dialogue Writer
2004	Pravaha	Yes	Yes	Yes	Screened at the Indian Panorama section of the IFFI 2004 and the Hyderabad International Film Festival in 2007
2008	Moggina Jade	Yes	Yes	Yes	Won—Karnataka State Film Award for Best Director
2010	Beli Matthu Hola	Yes	Screenplay	Yes	Screened at 18 film festivals including the Indian Panorama section of the IFFI 2009 and the Pune International Film Festival
2013	Hejjegalu	Yes	Screenplay	No	Won—National Film Award for Best Children's Film
2012	Kruthi	Yes	Yes	No	
2020	Giliyu Panjaradolilla (Parrot Not In The Cage)	Yes	Yes	Yes	Won—Karnataka State Film Award for Special Film of Social Concern; Screened at the 13th Bengaluru International Film Festival; Official Selection VI FICNOVA 2022

== Bibliography ==
- Kannada Cinema: Jagathika Cinema Vikasa-Prerane Prabhava — Won the National Film Award – Special Mention (Book on Cinema)
