= Sarvamangala =

- Directed by: Chaduranga
- Written by: Chaduranga
- Screenplay by: Chaduranga
- Produced by: Doddammanni Urs
- Starring: Rajkumar; K. S. Ashwath; Kalpana; Sampath
- Cinematography: T. Ellappan; V. Manohar
- Edited by: P. U. S. Maniyam; P. S. Murthy
- Music by: Satyam
- Production company: Sri Nagendra Chitrakala
- Distributed by: KCN Movies
- Release date: 1968
- Country: India
- Language: Kannada

Sarvamangala is a 1968 Indian Kannada-language film, directed by Chaduranga based on his own novel of the same name. The film was produced by Doddammanni Urs. The film stars Rajkumar, K. S. Ashwath, Kalpana and Sampath. The film has musical score by Satyam.

== Cast ==
- Rajkumar as Nataraja
- K. S. Ashwath
- Kalpana as Mangala
- Sampath
- M. Jayashree
- M. N. Lakshmi Devi
- Mallikarjunappa
- Srirangamurthy
- Lakshmi Bai
- Chennappa
- Namadev
- Papamma
- Shanthala
- C. K. Kalavathi
- Thara
- Master Vikram as young Nataraja
- Baby Girija as young Mangala
- Baby Sarvamangala
- R. Gururaja Rao

== Soundtrack ==
The music was composed by Satyam.

No.	Song	Singers	Lyrics	Length (m:ss)
1	"Javaraya Bandare"	P. B. Sreenivas	Janapada Sahitya	00:40
2	"Laali Laali" 1	S. Janaki	Janapada Sahitya	03:00
3	"Nannavalu Nannadaya"	P. B. Sreenivas, P. Susheela	K S Narasimhaswamy	03:38
4	"Maneya Jyothiyu"	T. M. Soundararajan	Vijaya Narasimha	03:59
5	"Thengella Thoogadi"	T. M. Soundararajan, S. Janaki	M. Nagendra Babu	05:38
6	"Andha Chendada Hoove"	P. Leela, Jayadev		03:30
7	"Cheluvina Siriye Barele"	A. L. Raghavan		03:24
8	"Kannadave Thaynudiyu"	P. B. Sreenivas		01:43
9	"Krishna Bidu Bidu Kopava"	S. Janaki		03:01
10	"Laali Laali" 2	S. Janaki		02:59
11	"Paripariya Parimalidhi"	P. B. Sreenivas		03:18
12	"Undadabahudu Odibaa"	P. Susheela	Janapada Sahitya	03:28
