= Railway Children (film) =

- Directed by: Prithvi Konanur
- Screenplay by: Prithvi Konanur
- Starring: Manohara K.: Syed Pervez; Yash Shetty; Divya M. R.; Karthik; Parimala
- Cinematography: Eswaran Thangavel
- Edited by: Shivkumar Swamy
- Production company: Tin Drum Beats
- Release date: 23 October 2016 (Mumbai Film Festival)
- Running time: 115 minutes
- Country: India
- Language: Kannada

Railway Children is a 2016 Indian Kannada feature film written and directed by Prithvi Konanur. It is inspired from Rescuing Railway Children written by Lalitha Iyer and Malcolm Harper that describes the lives of children that run away from their homes, live in railway stations and trains, and grow up as criminals, despite their intentions being harmless and seeking only to earn a living.

Produced by TinDrum Beats, the film featured mostly non-actors. The plot revolves around a 12-year-old runaway who falls into the hands of a gang involved in illegal businesses. Manohara K., Syed Pervez, Yash Shetty, Divya M. R., Karthik and Parimala appear in lead roles. The film premiered at the Mumbai International Film Festival in October 2016. Manohara won the National Film Award for Best Child Artist and Karnataka State Film Award for Best Child Actor (Male) for his performance. The film was also named the Second Best Film at the 2016 Karnataka State Film Awards.

== Cast ==
- Mahonara K. as Jollu
- Yash Shetty as Solution
- Syed Pervez as Pappu
- Karthik as Karthik
- Srikanth as Railway child
- Vj Shetty as a Police inspector
- Hanumant Raju as Railway child
- Divya M. R. as Divya
- Satish Acharya
- Naresh as phone booth owner
- Parimala as Raju
- Manjunath as Police Constable
- Narasappa as Jollu's father
- Akash as Railway child
- Ramesh Babua as ticket collector
- Basavaraju as beggar
- Chinnu as new recruit
- Mangala as Jollu's mother
- Jyothi as NGO worker
- Ramachandra Hosur as tea stall owner

== Production ==
Railway Children was produced through crowdfunding by Tindrum Beats, a film production company based in Udupi. The film was also supported by Don Thompson (producer, playwright) through NextPix/FirstPix grant.

== Soundtrack ==
Chandan Shetty scored the film's music and for its soundtrack. The soundtrack was released on YouTube.

No.	Title	Lyrics	Artist(s)	Length
1.	"Railway Children – Rap"	Chandan Shetty, Manohara K	Manohara K, Chandan Shetty	2:30
2.	"Male Moda"	Vishnumoorthy Prabhu	Chandan Shetty	3:30
Total length:				6

== Release and reception ==
The film premiered at the Jio Mami Mumbai film Festival on 23 October 2016 where it competed for the Golden Gateway award. It was reported that it would also be screened at the European Film festival before releasing theatrically in India.

The film was released in select multiplexes and single screen cinema halls in major cities in Karnataka on 22 December 2017.

The film was met with critical acclaim. Wishberry.in included it among the 9 brilliant Indian films of 2016

Bangalore Mirror gave 4 out of 5 wrote "for US-returned techie-turned-director Prithvi has lent it the mature tone while retaining the suspense till the end whose parallel can best be seen in some of the Iranian flicks."

Kannada Prabha, a Kannada daily gave 4 out of 4 calling it a must-watch, and wrote in Kannada "The film has the ability to engage you and disturb you at the same time."

The Times of India gave 3.5 out of 5 and wrote " this film unwinds in its own leisurely pace, offering a strikingly real and scary peek into the lives of children who run away from homes and live near railway stations."

== Accolades ==
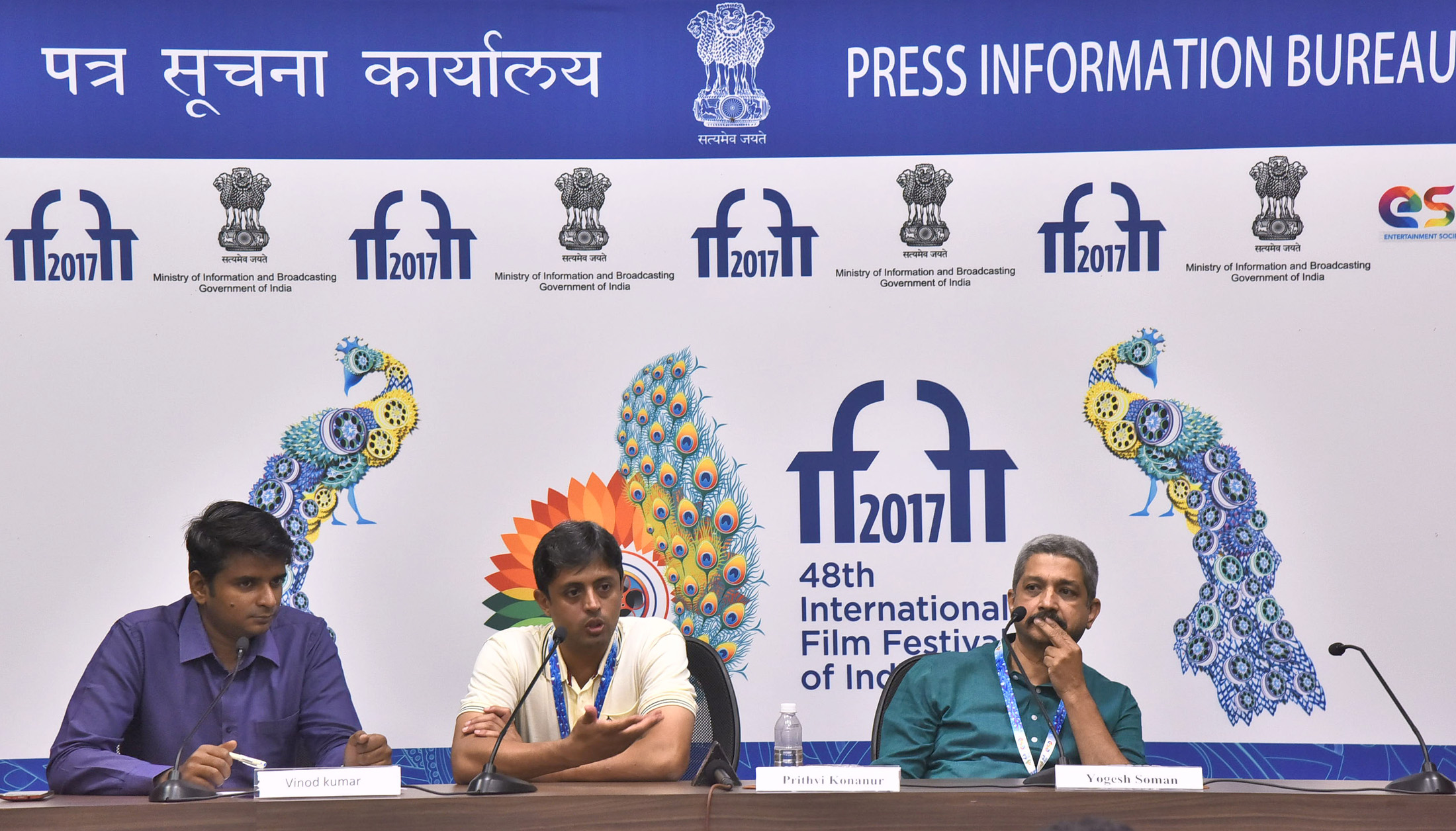
Director Prithvi Konanur (center), at IFFI (2017)

64th National Film Awards

- Winner National Film Award for Best Child Artist — Manohara K.

2016 Karnataka State Film Awards

- Winner Second Best Film — Prithvi Konanur
- Winner Best Child Actor (Male) — Manohara K.

Mumbai Film Festival 2016

- Nominated for Golden Gateway award
- Nominated for OXFAM Best film on Gender Equality

Zlín Film Festival

- Winner Ecumenical Jury Special Mention
- Nominated for Golden Slipper Award For Best Youth Film

Asia Pacific Screen Awards

- In Competition Best Film on Youth

Asian Film Festival Barcelona

- Winner Jury Special Mention

International Film Festival of India 2017

- Selection Indian Panorama Section
- Nomination ICFT UNESCO Gandhi Medal

All Lights India International Film Festival 2017

- Winner Best Indian Film

=== Festival screenings ===
- Chicago South Asia Film Festival
- Melbourne Indian Film Festival
- Bangalore Queer Film Festival
- Pune International Film Festival
