= Uyyale =

- Directed by: N. Lakshminarayan
- Based on: Uyyale by Chaduranga
- Produced by: G. N. Lakshmipathy
- Starring: Rajkumar; Kalpana; K. S. Ashwath; Balakrishna
- Cinematography: N. G. Rao
- Edited by: P. Bhakthavatsalam
- Music by: Vijaya Bhaskar
- Production company: Bharath Enterprises
- Release date: 1969
- Running time: 129 minutes
- Country: India
- Language: Kannada

Uyyale ( transl. The Swing) is a 1969 Kannada language romantic drama film directed by N. Lakshminarayan and starring Rajkumar and Kalpana. The film is a screen adaptation of the novel of the same name written by the novelist Chaduranga (Subramanyaraja Urs). The film presents a delicate tale of the extra-marital love of a woman neglected by her husband reflecting the social and moral laws of married life. Radha is the second wife of an extremely negligent Shesha. However, when Krishna, Shesha's cousin, enters her life, they form a unique bond with each other.

Besides writing the story, Chaduranga also wrote the dialogues for the film and won Karnataka State Film Award for the year 1979 for this story. The soundtrack and original score composed by Vijaya Bhaskar was widely acclaimed and appreciated. Produced by Gopal - Lakshman duo, the film fetched the Karnataka State Film Award for Best Film award for the same year. The film was screened twice at the IFFI Retrospect - once in 1992 and once again in 2019 on the occasion of the 50th year of IFFI. In a small drama sequence, Rajkumar appears as Gautama Buddha and Leelavathi as Kisa Gotami.

== Cast ==
- Rajkumar as Krishna Gowda
- Kalpana as Radha
- K. S. Ashwath as Seshu Rao, Radha's husband
- Leelavathi as stage actor (cameo)
- M. Jayashree as Krishna's mother
- Balakrishna as Seetapathi, Seshu's neighbour
- Ramadevi as Seetha, Seetapathi's wife
- Premalatha as Kanaka
- Papamma as Kanaka's mother
- N. K. Narasimhaiah
- Baby Girija as Prabha

== Soundtrack ==
The songs were composed by Vijaya Bhaskar. Rajkumar "humming" the entire lyrics of Doniyolage Neenu in a sequence in this movie remains the only instance of him "singing" in the music direction of Vijaya Bhaskar apart from the rendition in the drama sequence (Yamaniyama) in the 1999 movie Maha Edabidangi.

Song title	Singers	Lyrics
"Kaddu Kaddu Nodo"	P. B. Sreenivas	R. N. Jayagopal
"Cheluvina Kale"	P. Susheela	Vijaya Narasimha
"Nagutha Haadale"	P. B. Sreenivas	Geethapriya
"Kallu Kavitheya Haaduvudu"	P. B. Sreenivas	Chi. Udaya Shankar
"Doniyolage Neenu"	P. Susheela	R. N. Jayagopal

== Awards ==
- Karnataka State Film Awards
1. Second Best Film
2. Best Story writer - Chaduranga
