= Mussanje =

Indian drama film

- DVD cover
- Directed by: P. R. Ramadas Naidu
- Written by: P. R. Ramadas Naidu
- Produced by: P. R. Ramadas Naidu; Beerappa
- Starring: Dattatreya; Master Hirannaiah; Renukamma Murgod
- Cinematography: Ashok Naidu
- Edited by: Anil Naidu
- Music by: L. Vaidyanathan
- Production company: Naidu Studio Productions
- Release date: 2001
- Country: India
- Language: Kannada

Mussanje (transl. Dusk/Twilight) is a 2001 Indian Kannada-language drama film written, produced, and directed by P. R. Ramadas Naidu and starring Dattatreya, Master Hirannaiah and Renukamma Murgod.

== Cast ==
- Dattatreya as Seshanna
- Master Hirannaiah as Shivaramu
- Renukamma Murgod as Doddamma
- Pavitra Lokesh
- G. V. Sharadha
- Venkata Rao
- Srinivas Prabhu as a helpless son
- Bhargavi Narayan
- Rohith Bhat as Basavaraju

== Reception ==
A critic from Chitraloka.com wrote that "to know what is life all about from dawn to dusk, have a look at this film".

== Accolades ==
Event	Category	Recipient	Ref.
2000–01 Karnataka State Film Awards	First Best Film	Mussanje	
2000–01 Karnataka State Film Awards	Best Director	P. R. Ramadas Naidu	
2000–01 Karnataka State Film Awards	Best Child Actor	Rohith Bhat	
2000–01 Karnataka State Film Awards	Best Editing	Anil Naidu	
2000–01 Karnataka State Film Awards	Best Dialogue Writer	P. R. Ramdas Naidu	
