= Chaduranga =

Indian writer

Subramanyaraje Urs
- Born: 1916
- Died: 19 October 1998 (aged 81–82); Mysore, India
- Writing career
- Pen name: Chaduranga

Subramanyaraje Urs ( ; 1 January 1916), known by his pseudonym Chaduranga, was an Indian writer in Kannada language. He wrote four novels—Sarvamangala, Uyyale, Vaishakha, and Hejjala—and a few other short stories. Chaduranga directed the on-screen version of Sarvamangala in 1968 while Uyyale was made into a movie of same name in 1969.

== Awards ==
Chaduranga was honoured with the State Sahitya Academy Award in 1982, the Karnataka State Rajyotsava award, the Central Sahitya Academy award, and an honorary doctorate by the Mysore University in 1993.
