= 2007–08 Karnataka State Film Awards =

Annual Indian film awards ceremony

The Karnataka State Film Awards 2007–08, presented by the Government of Karnataka, honoured the best of Kannada Cinema releases in the year 2007.

== Lifetime achievement award ==
Name of Award	Awardee(s)	Awarded As
• Dr. Rajkumar Award • Puttanna Kanagal Award • Lifetime Contribution to Kannada Cinema Award	• Vishnuvardhan • Renuka Sharma • Parvathamma Rajkumar	• Actor • Director • Producer

== Jury ==
A committee headed by Kesari Haravoo was appointed to evaluate the awards.

== Film awards ==
Name of Award	Film	Producer	Director
First Best Film	Gulabi Talkies	Basant Kumar Patil	Girish Kasaravalli
Second Best Film	Moggina Jade	• Beerappa • P. R. Ramadas Naidu	P. R. Ramadas Naidu
Third Best Film	Maathaad Maathaadu Mallige	K. Manju	Nagathihalli Chandrashekar
Best Film Of Social Concern	Banada Neralu	V. Chandrakanth	Umashankar Swamy
Best Children Film	Ekalavya	Abhiruchi Chithra	Baraguru Ramachandrappa
Best Regional Film	Birse (Tulu language)		

== Other awards ==
Name of Award	Film	Awardee(s)
Best Direction	Moggina Jade	Ramadas Naidu
Best Actor	Milana	Puneeth Rajkumar
Best Actress	Gulabi Talkies	Umashree
Best Supporting Actor	Moggina Jade	Rajesh Nataranga
Best Supporting Actress	Avva	Nivedhitha
Best Child Actor	Naanu Gandhi	Likhith
Best Child Actress	Gubbachchigalu	Prakruthi
Best Music Direction	Inthi Ninna Preethiya	Sadhu Kokila
Best Male Playback Singer	Savi Savi Nenapu ("Nenapu Nenapu")	S. P. Balasubrahmanyam
Best Female Playback Singer	Inthi Ninna Preethiya ("Madhuvana Karedare")	Vaani Harikrishna
Best Cinematography	Aa Dinagalu	H. C. Venu
Best Editing	Savi Savi Nenapu	Suresh Urs
Best Lyrics	Maathaad Maathaadu Mallige ("Ella Maaya")	Gollahalli Shivaprasad
Best Sound Recording	Accident	Kumar
Best Art Direction	Kurunaadu	G. Murthy
Best Story Writer	Avva	P. Lankesh
Best Screenplay	Gulabi Talkies	Girish Kasaravalli
Best Dialogue Writer	Aa Dinagalu	Agni Shridhar
Best Male Dubbing Artist	Aa Dinagalu	Sudarshan
Best Female Dubbing Artist	Kurunaadu	Champa Shetty
