= Hadinelentu =

- Theatrical release poster
- Directed by: Prithvi Konanur
- Written by: Prithvi Konanur; Anupama Hegde
- Produced by: Prithvi Konanur
- Starring: Sherlyn Bhosale; Neeraj Mathew
- Cinematography: Arjun Raja
- Edited by: Shivakumara Swamy
- Production company: Konanur Productions
- Release date: 20 November 2022 (53rd International Film Festival of India)
- Country: India
- Language: Kannada

Hadinelentu 17/18 (transl. Seventeeners) is a 2022 Indian Kannada-language mystery thriller film directed by Prithvi Konanur and starring Sherlyn Bhosale and Neeraj Mathew. The film was screened at film festivals in 2022 and was theatrically released on 26 January 2024. The film received positive reviews from critics.

== Plot ==
Two PU students, Deepa and Hari, engage in sex in a classroom and film it privately. The video gets leaked and becomes viral and conflict ensues for all the stakeholders.

== Cast ==
- Sherlyn Bhosale as Deepa
- Neeraj Mathew as Hari
- Rekha Kudligi as Seetha
- Ravi Hebbar as Badri
- Gunjalamma as Deepa's mother
- Lakshmi Narayana as Abdul
- Nagendra Sha
- Sudha Belawadi
- Bhavani Prakash

== Reception ==
Hadinelentu premiered at the 27th Busan International Film Festival with a nomination for the Kim Jiseok Award. It had its Indian premiere at the 53rd International Film Festival of India Goa where it was chosen as the Opening Film of the Indian Panorama section.

The film was released in select cinemas in the state of Karnataka on 26 January 2024. The film received critical acclaim.

Reviewing the film at the Chennai International Film Festival in 2022, a critic from The News Minute wrote that "Hadinelentu is a razor-sharp social commentary. Additionally, it also persuades its viewers to think deeper about the age of consent for sexual relationships, which makes it particularly relevant".

A critic from The Hindu wrote that "It’s surprising how Hadinelentu hardly fumbles. That’s what makes the film world-class".

A critic from OTTplay rated the film 3 1/2 out of 5 and wrote that "Prithvi, though, is more interested in the by-products of this act – gender disparity, casteism and classism – all of which makes Hadinelentu a riveting watch from start to finish".

A critic from The Wire wrote that "In Hadinelentu, one can feel Konanur’s anger about society’s many injustices, but he never lets rage get the better of him".

The film was released on YouTube on 15 August 2024.

== Accolades ==
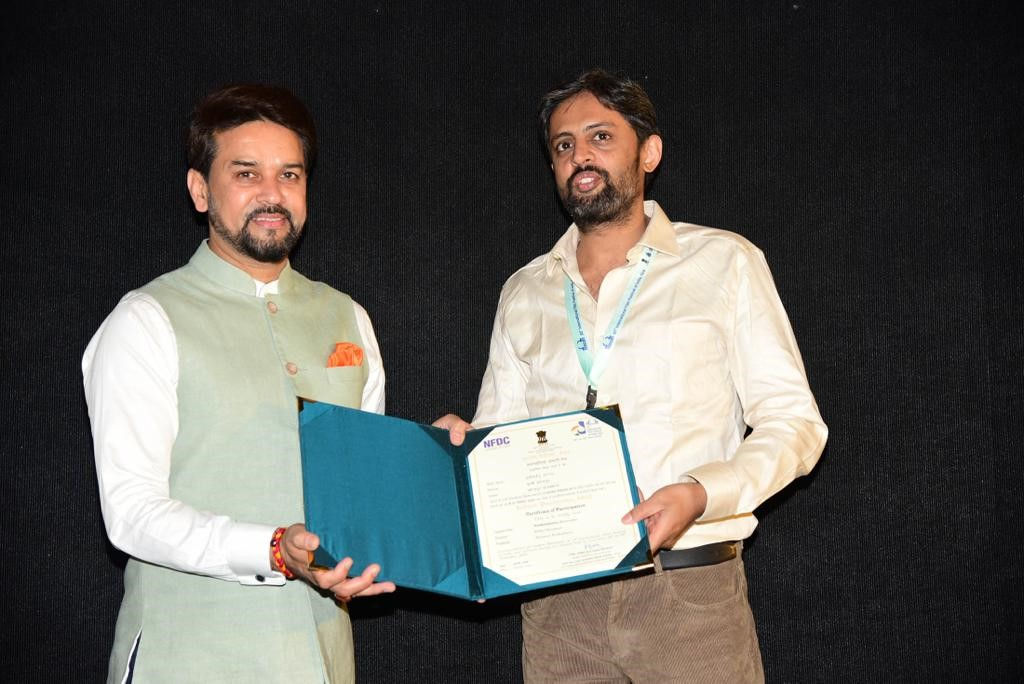
Director Prithvi Konanur receiving the certificate from the Minister of Information and Broadcasting

Busan International Film Festival 2022

- Nominee Kim Jiseok Award — Hadinelentu/Prithvi Konanur

International Film Festival of India 2022

- Indian Panorama — Hadinelentu (Also the Opening Film)

Pune International Film Festival 2023

- Nominatee Best Film — Hadinelentu
- Nominatee Best Director — Prithvi Konanur.

Bengaluru International Film Festival 2023

- Winner Second Best Kannada Film – Hadinelentu/Prithvi Konanur

Indian Film Festival of Melbourne

- Winner Best Director – Prithvi Konanur
- Nominee Best Indie Film – Hadinelentu

New York Indian Film Festival

- Nominee Best Screenplay – Prithvi Konanur/Anupama Hegde

Fipresci India Grandprix

- Nominee Top 10 Indian Films of 2022 – Hadinelentu

Ottawa Indian Film Festival 2023

- Winner Best Film – Hadinelentu

Motovun Film Festival 2023

- Nominee – Propeler Motovuna Award

Festival Screenings

- International Film Festival of Kerala
- Chennai international Film Festival
- Hong Kong International Film Festival
- Busan Youth and Kids Film Festival

Award	Category	Recipient	Result	Ref
Chandanavana Film Critics Awards 2025	Best Film	Konanur Productions	Won	
Chandanavana Film Critics Awards 2025	Best Supporting Actress	Rekha Kudligi	Won	
Chandanavana Film Critics Awards 2025	Best Screenplay	Prithvi Konanur and Anupama Hegde	Won	
Chandanavana Film Critics Awards 2025	Best Debut Actress	Sherlyn Bhosale	Won	
Prajavani Cine Sammana 2025	Film of the Year	Konanur Productions	Nominated	
Prajavani Cine Sammana 2025	Best Direction	Prithvi Konanur	Nominated	
Prajavani Cine Sammana 2025	Best Screenplay	Prithvi Konanur and Anupama Hegde	Nominated	
Prajavani Cine Sammana 2025	Socially Impactful Film	Konanur Productions	Won	
Prajavani Cine Sammana 2025	Popular Film	Konanur Productions	Nominated	
Filmfare Awards South 2025	Best Film — Kannada	Konanur Productions	Nominated	
Filmfare Awards South 2025	Best Supporting Actress — Kannada	Rekha Kudligi	Nominated	
Filmfare Awards South 2025	Best Direction — Kannada	Prithvi Konanur	Won	
