= Varnapatala =

Indian Kannada-language family drama film

- Theatrical release poster
- Directed by: Chethan Mundadi
- Story by: Dr. Saraswathi Hosdurga; Karthik Saragur; Kavita Santhosh
- Produced by: Dr. Saraswathi Hosdurga; Kavita Santhosh; Dr. Saraswathi Hosdurga
- Starring: Jyothi Rai; Anoop Sagar; Dhanika Hegde
- Cinematography: Ganesh Hegde
- Edited by: Srikanth Gowda
- Music by: Harsha Vardhan Raj
- Production company: Sri Sai Ganesh Productions
- Release date: 2020
- Country: India
- Language: Kannada

Varnapatala (or Spectrum) is a 2020 Indian Kannada-language family drama film directed by Chethan Mundadi. The film is inspired by real life incidents and stars Dhanika Hegde as an autistic child and Jyothi Rai and Anoop Sagar as her parents.

== Cast ==
- Jyothi Rai as Nithya
- Anoop Sagar as Michael
- Arjun Nagarkar
- Suhasini Maniratnam as a doctor
- Anshika Shetty
- Dhanika Hegde as Myna
- Srikanth Heblikar
- Arvind Rao
- Indira Nair
- Chethan Rai
- Guru Hegde

== Release ==
The film was shortlisted at the UK Asian film festivals in 2020 and was theatrically released in 2022.

== Reception ==
Jagadish Angadi of Deccan Herald rated the film 4/5 stars and wrote, "The screenplay is both nuanced and riveting. Mundadi conveys how exhausting, traumatic, and scary it is for parents to combat myths concerning the disorder. It partially appears to be a children’s film, and partially an educational film on ASD". Priya Kerwashe of Asianet Suvarna gave the film the same rating and wrote that the fact that the main character is an autistic child and the entire film is built naturally is a testament to the talent of director Chethan Mundadi. Vani Bhatt of Udayavani wrote that Varnapatala is an attempt to dispel the misconceptions about autism in society and to make it clear that everyone has an opportunity to live equally. Jagadish Angadi of Prajavani called the film a new experiment and that the film should be viewed from a different perspective.

== Accolades ==
Varnapatala won the Karnataka State Film Award for Second Best Film in 2020.
