= Pinki Elli =

Indian Kannada-language drama film

Pinki Elli?
- Theatrical release poster
- Directed by: Prithvi Konanur
- Starring: Akshatha Pandavapura; Anoop Shoonya; Deepak Subramanya; Gunjalamma
- Cinematography: P Arjun Raja
- Production company: Picture Tree International
- Release dates: October 2020 ( Busan International Film Festival); 2 June 2023 (India)
- Country: India
- Language: Kannada

Pinki Elli? (transl. Where is Pinki?) is a 2020 Indian Kannada-language drama film directed by Prithvi Konanur and starring Akshatha Pandavapura, Anoop Shoonya, Deepak Subramanya, and Gunjalamma. The film was screened at the Bengaluru International Film Festival.

== Plot ==
Inspired by a true incident that happened in Bengaluru ten years ago, an 8-month-old baby nicknamed Pinki goes missing.

== Cast ==
- Akshatha Pandavapura as Bindushree, Pankaja/Pinki's mother
- Anoop Shoonya as Girish
- Deepak Subramanya as Manjunath
- Gunjalamma as Sanamma

== Reception ==
A critic from The News Minute wrote, "the collective impact of the sensitive material, the style of filmmaking, and the overall authenticity is undeniably overwhelming". A critic from The Hindu wrote, "The minimalistic performances compliment the realistic nature of the film. Pinki Elli shows people struggling to match the pace of the bustling city. They are all flawed. Yet, at some level, we sympathise with them". A critic from Bangalore Mirror rated the film 3.5 out of 5 stars and wrote, "It is a must watch for all". A Sharadhaa of Cinema Express gave the film the same rating and wrote, "Pinki Elli? sheds light on rare and lesser-explored aspects of life. It doesn’t rely on overt dialogues to deliver its messages; instead, they are skillfully woven into the fabric of each scene". A critic from OTTplay gave the film the same rating and wrote, "It’s a serious film that cuts to the chase in no time. If thought-provoking cinema with no extra frills (the film does not even have a background score)".

== Accolades ==
The film premiered at the Busan International Film Festival under the 'Window on Asian Cinema' section. The film became the first Kannada film to be chosen as the inaugural film of the New York Indian Film Festival. The film also won the 2020 Karnataka State Film Award for Best Film, which was announced in 2025. The film was selected for the Indian Panorama section at the International Film Festival of India in 2020.

Year	Festival	Section / Category	Recipient(s)	Result
2020	International Film Festival of India	Indian Panorama	Pinki Elli?	Selected
2020	Busan International Film Festival	Window on Asian Cinema	Pinki Elli?	Selected
2020	Kolkata International Film Festival	Golden Royal Bengal Tiger Award for Best Director	Prithvi Konanur	Nominated
2020	Kolkata International Film Festival	Best Indian Film	Prithvi Konanur	Nominated
2020	Kolkata International Film Festival	Best Director	Prithvi Konanur	Nominated
2020	Hainan International Film Festival	Golden Coconut for Best Feature Film	Prithvi Konanur	Nominated
2021	Prague International Film Festival	Amnesty International Febiofest Award for Best Film	Prithvi Konanur	Nominated
2021	Asian Film Festival Barcelona	Best Film (Panorama Section)	Pinki Elli?	Won
2021	Bengaluru International Film Festival	Kannada Cinema Competition	Prithvi Konanur	Won
2021	Bengaluru International Film Festival	Chitrabharathi Section	Prithvi Konanur	Nominated
2021	Bengaluru International Film Festival	Asian Cinema Competition	Prithvi Konanur	Nominated
2021	New York Indian Film Festival	Best Screenplay	Prithvi Konanur	Won
2021	New York Indian Film Festival	Best Actress	Akshatha Pandavapura	Won
2021	New York Indian Film Festival	Best Film	Pinki Elli?	Nominated
2021	FIPRESCI – India Grand Prix	Best Indian Feature Film	Prithvi Konanur	Nominated
2021	Indian Film Festival of Melbourne	Best Director (Honorary Mention)	Prithvi Konanur	Won
2021	Indian Film Festival of Melbourne	Best Indie Film	Pinki Elli?	Nominated
2023	Indian Film Festival of Melbourne	Best Actress	Akshatha Pandavapura	Nominated
2024	Filmfare Awards South	Best Film (Critics')	Pinki Elli? / Prithvi Konanur	Won
2024	Filmfare Awards South	Best Actress	Akshatha Pandavapura	Nominated
2024	Filmfare Awards South	Best Supporting Actress	Gunjalamma	Nominated
2024	Critics' Choice Film Awards	Best Supporting Actress	Gunjalamma	Nominated
2025	2020 Karnataka State Film Awards	Best Film	Pinki Elli?	Won
2025	2020 Karnataka State Film Awards	Best Actress	Akshatha Pandavapura	Won
